= Bob Kelly (wrestler) =

American professional wrestler

Personal information
- Born: Robert Raymond Kelley; June 28, 1936 Louisville, Kentucky, U.S.
- Died: October 12, 2014 (aged 78)
- Spouse: Chris (m. June 1958)
- Children: 5

Professional wrestling career
- Ring name(s): Bob Kelly; Hangman
- Billed height: 5 ft 11 in (180 cm)
- Billed weight: 216 lb (98 kg)
- Billed from: Louisville, Kentucky, U.S.
- Trained by: Wee Willie Davis; Doug Kinslow
- Debut: 1959
- Retired: 1987
- Military service
- Branch: United States Marine Corps

Robert Raymond Kelley (June 28, 1936 – October 12, 2014), better known as "Cowboy" Bob Kelly, was an American professional wrestler and professional wrestling booker best known for his in-ring tenure during the 1960s and 70s. Arguably the most popular wrestler to compete in Gulf Coast Championship Wrestling, Kelly has been described as "John Wayne, Wyatt Earp and Roy Rogers all rolled into one" and a "hero to thousands upon thousands of Gulf Coast Wrestling Fans". He was a record 18-time NWA Mississippi Heavyweight Champion and 11 time NWA Gulf Coast Heavyweight Champion and was inducted into the NWA Hall of Fame as part of the class of 2014.

== Early life ==
Kelley was born on a farm in rural Kentucky on June 28, 1936. Prior to entering the world of professional wrestling, he was an avid rodeo fan and competitive bronco rider. It was from here that the nickname "cowboy" originated. He served a stint in the U.S. Marine Corps in the early 1950s, where he first got a taste for grappling as part of the wrestling team.

== Professional wrestling career ==
Kelly married his wife, Chris, in June 1958 and started his journey in pro-wrestling the following year in Louisville, Kentucky. He began by setting up rings and helping the ring crew in a promotion run by Wee Willie Davis and soon was doing ring announcing for the outfit. This led to stints as a referee and eventually as an in-ring competitor, initially with the nickname “Irish”. Kelly has credited fellow wrestler Matt Gilmore (aka Duncan McTavish) as being his mentor. “He always liked me” Kelly said of Gilmore, “He watched me work…he asked Larry to book me with him in North Bay so he could work with me and show me what to do”.

After a tenure wrestling in North Bay, Ontario, Canada, Kelly went on to further his wrestling skills while under Lee Fields and Charlie Carr in Mobile, Alabama. He took quickly to the city, later starting that “I’m so thankful I spent my time in Mobile”. It work here where he also developed a close friendship with promoter Lee Fields, who became his best friend. He work often remark how the two miracles of his life were meeting his wife and making friends with Lee Fields. After Lee's retirement, Kelly travelled and occasionally tagged with his younger brother, Bobby. Kelly stated that “him and I just got along. We went over a million miles together. He was just great to be around”.

Throughout his career, Kelly's home territory was the Gulf Coast region, a territory spanning from Northern Florida into Alabama and Mississippi. He became a top babyface in the territory, so much so that he didn't need to travel often, as was the case for the majority of wrestlers in the United States at the time. “It was a deal where we didn’t need to go anywhere else. We had a home there and we was booked and we was on top, we made money” Kelly stated, “we were only out of town once or twice a week”. Kelly would travel to Eddie Graham’s Southern Florida territory and had occasionally wrestled in Puerto Rico, but he had no need to wrestle outside the Gulf Coast. Kelly always appreciated the importance of his fanbase. He remarked that he and Fields “after the matches, we’d never just leave. We stayed around and signed autographs”. During his career, Kelly had memorable feuds with wrestlers such as the Wrestling Pro, Eddie Sullivan and perhaps his most heated rival, Don Fargo.

Kelly later became a booker for the Gulf Coast territory. He worked in this position for many years, coming “out of retirement” occasionally as part of the storylines. He wrestled his final match in 1986, a decade after his full-time wrestling career had ended in 1977. Working alongside Lee Fields, the pair coordinated with Sam Muchnick and NWA to bring various stars from other territories into Mobile, Pensacola, Louisiana and Mississippi.

== Post wrestling ==
Through his friendship with Lee Fields who owned a motor racetrack, Kelly also became a race car driver. He also owned a wrecked service in Mobile in his post-wrestling years. He was a member of the Cauliflower Alley Club Board of Directors and was President of the annual Gulf Coast Wrestlers Reunion in his later life.

== Personal life ==
Kelly was good friends with William “Bill” Moody, known as Paul Bearer in WWE. He had said he was “devastated” after learning of Moody's passing in 2013. Kelly had spent time with Moody on the Saturday before his passing at the annual Gulf Coast Wrestlers Reunion in Mobile. Moody had credited Kelly with getting him interested in the wrestling business

Kelly had five children with his wife Chris, who died in October 2013. Bob died on October 12, 2014, with his family by his side after an illness

== Championships and accomplishments ==
- Gulf Coast Championship Wrestling
  - Lee Fields Gulf Coast Wrestling Hall of Fame (class of 2013)
  - NWA Alabama Heavyweight Championship (1 time)
  - NWA Brass Knuckles Championship (Gulf Coast version)
  - NWA City of Mobile Heavyweight Championship (4 times)
  - NWA Gulf Coast Heavyweight Championship (11 times)
  - NWA Gulf Coast Louisiana Heavyweight Championship (1 time)
  - NWA Gulf Coast Tag Team Championship (5 times) - with Bobby Fields (3 times), Ramon Perez (1 time), and Rip Tyler (1 time)
  - NWA Mississippi Heavyweight Championship (18 times)
  - NWA Mississippi Tag Team Championship (4 times) - with Frank Dalton (2 times) and Bobby Fields (2 times)
  - NWA United States Tag Team Championship (3 times) - with Mike Boyette (1 time), Ken Lucas (1 time), and Rocket Monroe (1 time)
- National Wrestling Alliance
  - NWA Hall of Fame (class of 2014)
