= Eddie Sullivan =

American professional wrestler

Personal information
- Born: Ruben Joe Huizar; June 8, 1941 Buckeye, Arizona, U.S.
- Died: November 24, 2000 (aged 64)

Professional wrestling career
- Ring name(s): Eddie Sullivan; Mighty Yankee; Wrestling Pro #2
- Billed height: 5 ft 10 in (178 cm)
- Billed weight: 238 lb (108 kg)
- Trained by: Mike DiBiase; Tona Tomah
- Debut: 1964
- Retired: 1985

Ruben Joe Huizar (June 8, 1941 – November 24, 2000), better known as "Eddie Sullivan, was an American professional wrestler who compete in Gulf Coast Championship Wrestling and won many titles in the territory. He also worked for NWA Mid-America, World Wide Wrestling Federation and Japan.

Sullivan began his professional wrestling career in 1964. During most of his career, he worked in the Gulf Coast. He teamed with the Mighty Yankee #2 (Frank Morell) and Mighty Yankee #3 (Ron Wright) from 1968 to 1969. Mainly his career he teamed with Rip Tyler and won many tag titles.

In 1974, he worked for the World Wide Wrestling Federation.

He worked in Japan as early as 1969 for Japan Wrestling Association, then New Japan Pro Wrestling in 1972, and International Wrestling Enterprise from 1976 1977 and 1980. Also worked for All Japan Pro Wrestling in 1984.

His last promotion was working for American Wrestling Association in Minnesota from 1984 until his last match in 1985. Often teamed with the Magnificent Zulu and Tom Zenk. He had matches against Kamala (wrestler).

Sullivan passed away on November 24, 2000, from either a stroke or a heart attack at 59.

== Championships and accomplishments ==
- Gulf Coast Championship Wrestling
  - NWA Alabama Heavyweight Championship (2 times)
  - NWA Gulf Coast Louisiana Heavyweight Championship (1 time)
  - NWA Mississippi Heavyweight Championship (5 times)
  - NWA United States Tag Team Championship (4 times) - with Rip Tyler (4)
  - NWA Gulf Coast Tag Team Championship (10 times) - with The Wrestling Pro (1), Rip Tyler (5), The Blue Yankee (1), Sonny King (1), Jack Morell (1)
- Pacific Northwest Wrestling
  - NWA Pacific Northwest Tag Team Championship (1 time) – with Ed Francis
- Superstar Championship Wrestling
  - SCW Western States Championship (1 time)
