= Don Carson (wrestler) =

American wrestler (1934–2013)

- Don Carson with his glove, "Peanut Butter"

Personal information
- Born: Donald Edward Gaston; November 20, 1934 Cleveland, Tennessee
- Died: March 16, 2013 (aged 78)

Professional wrestling career
- Ring name(s): Big C Mr. Knoxville; Tennessee Jawjacker
- Debut: 1963
- Retired: 1998

Donald Edward Gaston, better known as Don Carson (November 20, 1934 – March 16, 2013) was a professional wrestler and wrestling manager. Carson was known for his raspy voice and his loaded glove known as "Peanut Butter".

== Career ==
Little is known of Carson's early life. He was already wrestling for Georgia Championship Wrestling by 1963. He was billed as "Ted Blassie", which was based on Freddie Blassie and was billed as the "Pacific Coast" champion in August 1964 while wrestling in the northeastern United States. There, he feuded with Frank Scarpa and teamed up with Gypsy Joe Gonsalves and Bull Montana.

He captured the AAC World Heavyweight Championship on August 27, 1964 and made his Portland, Maine debut on September 5, 1964. Carson headed to Gulf Coast Championship Wrestling in 1965, capturing the NWA Gulf Coast Heavyweight Title, the NWA United States Junior Heavyweight Championship, the NWA Gulf Coast Tag Team Championship and the NWA Gulf Coast Louisiana Heavyweight Championship. Carson had a long feud with Bobby Fields while in the territory, meeting him in singles title and tag title matches. Don Carson usually teamed up Ron Carson against Fields and his partners Lee Fields and Ken Lucas. Don and Ron left the territory in July 1967 and headed to NWA Mid-America, where they won the NWA Mid-America World Tag Team Titles.

=== Don Carson and The Red Shadow ===
Don later started teaming with The Red Shadow after Ron Carson left the territory in December 1967. Don and The Red Shadow feuded with the team of Corsica Joe and Herb Welch and later Herb's nephew, Buddy Fuller teamed up with Sam Steamboat to feud with Don and The Red Shadow. The feud later reached its peak when Fuller and Steamboat beat Carson and The Red Shadow in a No Disqualification match with Herb Welch as the referee. Don and The Red shadow entered into a feud with Dennis Hall and former Carson enemy, Ken Lucas. The teams traded the NWA Mid-America Southern Tag Team Championship back and forth until Hall and Lucas defeated Don and The Red Shadow for the belts on May 27, 1968, with Jackie Fargo as the special ref. The two teams then met in a Texas death match on June 11, 1968, which Don and The Red Shadow won. Don and The Red Shadow then continued feuding with Jackie Fargo after. Fargo would team with Corsica Joe, Roughhouse Fargo and later Lou Thesz. Fargo and Thesz met Don and The Red Shadow in a tag title match on August 12, 1968, where Fargo and Thesz would have to leave town if they lost. Fargo and Thesz won but Don and The Red Shadow won following week in a match where the tag titles were on the line against The Red Shadow's mask. What followed was unclear as Don and The Red Shadow lost the tag titles on August 24 to Dennis Hall and Ken Lucas then lost them again to uncle and nephew duo of Buddy Fuller and Lester Welch on September 9. Fuller and Welch beat Carson and The Red Shadow in a Texas death match on September 16. Don and the Red Shadow then fought in two different no disqualification matches within 3 days of each other against The Mighty Yankees #1 and #2 and Dennis Hall and Ken Lucas. Hall and Lucas defeated Don and The Red Shadow in a rematch, which ended up one of the last matches of the Carson and Shadow team as The Red Shadow left the territory.

=== Los Angeles and Freddie Blassie ===
Carson found a new partner in Len Rossi in February 1969. The team won the NWA Mid-America World Tag Team Championship on March 13, 1969, before being defeated by Dante and The Great Mephisto on May 14, 1969. Carson headed to NWA Hollywood Wrestling in October 1969 in what turned out to be the biggest run of his career. Carson won the Americas Six Man Tag Team Trophy with Karl Von Brock and Great Kojika on November 3, 1969, by defeating Black Hawk, Pepper Martin and El Medico in a match that was later held up due to controversy. Carson and Mil Mascaras feuded in late 1969 with Mil beating him in a two out of three falls cage match on Nomvember 6, 1969 then beating him in a two out of three falls no disqualification match on December 5, 1969. Carson also feuded with El Medico during this time period. Carson and Great Kojika defeated El Medico and Pepe Lopez for the NWA Americas Tag Team Championship on December 11, 1969, and defeated him in an NWA Pacific Coast Heavyweight Title match on December 6, 1969.

Carson began teaming with Freddie Blassie during this time period. Carson and Blassie won the NWA Americas Tag Team Championship by 1970 and Carson was a triple champion at one point as he was a tag champion, the Pacific Coast Heavyweight Champion and the Beat The Champ Television Champion. However Carson and Blassie broke up during an argument prior to March 25, 1970, during Blassie's face turn and vacated the belts. Carson then lost his two other titles. Carson beat Blassie by ref's decision on April 9, 1970, then the two fought to a double countout on April 17, 1970. The pair then fought in a gladiator death match on May 1, 1970, where Blassie was victorious. Blassie gained two more wins over Carson via countout on May 7 in a lumberjack two out of three falls match and a regular two out of three falls match on May 9, 1970. The two then fought in another gladiator deathmatch where Blassie was again victorious on May 28, 1970. Carson left the territory during the first half of 1971.

On May 8, 1971, John Tolos "blinded" Blassie by throwing talcum powder in his eyes. The incident was said to be career ending for Blassie and was one of wrestling's biggest angles ever. With Blassie unable to wrestle, Carson came to his former friend and rival's aide. Carson defeated Tolos for the NWA Americas Heavyweight Championship on July 16, 1971, in a gladiator deathmatch but was defeated in a return gladiator deathmatch on July 30, 1971, for the title. Afterwards, Carson unsuccessfully tried to defeat Man Mountain Mike with the help of Bobby Burns in handicap matches. and battled with Ricky Hunter and Pat Barrett through the end of 1971. Carson feuded with Tony Rocco throughout 1972 and then left the Los Angeles territory.

=== Florida ===
Carson moved around for a while and became a regular for Championship Wrestling from Florida in July 1973. He was unsuccessful in multiple attempts at Tim Woods' NWA Florida Heavyweight Championship. He feuded with Jimmy Golden in October 1973. Golden defeated Carson in a Black Glove Challenge and won via DQ the next day in a match between them. Carson got revenge by beating Golden in a lights out match on October 30, 1978, and the pair traded wins on November 7 and 8 of 1973. Carson had multiple chances at the NWA Florida Tag Team Championship held by Paul Leduc and Jos LeDuc but was unsuccessful. Carson left the territory at the start of 1974.

=== Return to Tennessee ===
Carson started appearing in NWA Mid-America in August 1975. He and former rival Jackie Fargo teamed up to win the NWA United States Tag Team Championship from The Bicentennial Kings on October 27, 1975, and lost the titles and a two out of three falls no disqualification match to them soon after. Carson defeated Tommy Seigler for the NWA Southeastern Television Title on November 15, 1975, and then began a feud with Robert Fuller soon after. Carson won a $500 Dollar challenge from Fuller on November 21, then won a $3,500 Dollar challenge on November 28. The two went to a double disqualification in a match on December 25, 1975. Carson then defeated Fuller in a no disqualification match on January 11, 1976, and in a Non-Sanctioned Lights Out match on November 18, 1976. Carson won the NWA Southeastern Heavyweight Championship from Ron Wright on February 1, 1976 and lost the title back to him on February 14, 1976. Write then won a no disqualification match and a cage match against Carson and then beat him by disqualification on March 22, 1976. Carson lost the heavyweight title to Ron Fuller on April 2, 1976, and began feuding with him. The pair went to a double count out in a no disqualification match on April 16, 1976, then Fuller beat him two more times in regular matches on April 23 and April 30. Carson defeated Fuller for the NWA Southeastern Heavyweight Championship in a brass knuckles matches on May 7, 1976, then Fuller defeated him in a no disqualification match on May 14, to win the title back. The feud continued with Carson defeating Fuller in a loser leaves town match on July 23, 1976. Despite that result, they went to a no contest on July 30, 1976, in an unsanctioned lights out match. Fuller then defeated him in a cage match, a coal miners pole match, a Texas death match and finally a loser leaves town match (for six months) on September 24, 1976. The two then fought two more times while Carson hid his identity, competing as "Mr. Knoxville" before Carson finally left town.

Carson returned to the territory in September 1977. He defeated Bob Armstrong in a loser leaves town lights out match on October 5, 1977. It is unclear how, but Carson and The Assassin won the NWA Southeastern Tag Team Championship in late 1977 and lost it on an unknown date. They teamed up with Ron Wright to face the Fullers and The Georgia Jaw Jacker, who was a masked Bob Armstrong. The teams fought in a Texas death team match on February 20, 1978, and fought in a cage match on February 26, 1978. Carson found an ally in Ron Garvin after this and teamed up with him. The pairing did not last long though as Garvin defeated Carson on April 23, 1978, and then defeated Carson and The Mongolian Stomper in a no disqualification handicap match on May 26, 1978. Caron reunited with old partner, The Red Shadow on July 10, 1978, in Memphis for a few matches, which would be the last time they teamed together. Carson and Robert Fuller feuded again in July 1978. Fuller defeated Carson in a no disqualification, hair vs hair match then the two wrestled in a loser leaves town match on August 4, 1978. Carson assumed a new identity, competing as "The Tennessee Jawjacker" afterwards and continued with the company.

=== Final runs ===
Carson won the AWA Southern Tag Team Championship with Dennis Condrey via forfeit on February 18, 1979, after the previous champs split up. The team lost the titles 8 days later. Carson returned to Southeastern wrestling in August 1980 as "The Big C". He and "The Big C #2" (Dennis Condrey) won the CWF Tag Team Championship, but lost the titles later that month. Carson returned to Georgia Championship Wrestling in 1981. He took on a managerial role, managing The Mongolian Stomper. They feuded with Mr. Wrestling II and Tony Atlas. Robert Fuller and Carson feuded in March 1981 with Fuller defeating Carson in Texas death match. Dusty Rhodes and Carson then feuded with in April 1981, with Carson being defeated in a Texas bullrope match. Jerry Oates then beat Carson in a loser leaves town match on April 4, 1981. Carson had a brief spell in Southern Championship Wrestling and managed The Grapplers in Southwest Championship Wrestling. He ended his career with a run Southeastern Championship Wrestling. Carson's last match was against Ken Lucas in 1998.

== Personal life ==
Outside of wrestling, Carson was a deputy sheriff.

== Championships and accomplishments ==
- Big Time Wrestling
  - BTW World Heavyweight Championship (1 time)
- Georgia Championship Wrestling
  - NWA United States Junior Heavyweight Championship (1 time)
- Gulf Coast Championship Wrestling
  - NWA Gulf Coast Heavyweight Championship (5 times)
  - NWA Louisiana Heavyweight Championship (3 times)
  - NWA City of Pensacola Heavyweight Championship (1 time)
  - NWA Gulf Coast Tag Team Championship (8 times) – with Ron Carson (3), Dick Dunn (2), Ken Lucas (2), Rocket Monroe (1) and Greg Peterson (1)
  - NWA Gulf Coast Southern Tag Team Championship (2 times) – with Maxie York
- NWA Hollywood Wrestling
  - NWA Americas Heavyweight Championship (1 time)
  - NWA Pacific Coast Heavyweight Championship (1 time)
  - NWA Beat The Champ Television Championship (2 times)
  - NWA Americas Tag Team Championship (2 times) – with Fred Blassie and The Great Kojika
  - NWA Americas Six Man Tag Team Championship (1 time) – with Karl von Brock and The Great Kojika
- NWA Mid-America
  - NWA World Tag Team Championship (3 times) – with Len Rossi (2) and Ron Carson
  - NWA Southern Tag Team Championship (7 times) – with Dennis Condrey (1) and The Red Shadow (6)
  - NWA United States Tag Team Championship (1 time) – with Jackie Fargo
- Southeastern Championship Wrestling
  - NWA Southeastern Heavyweight Championship (Northern Division) (2 times)
  - NWA Southeastern Television Championship (1 time)
  - NWA Southeastern Tag Team Championship (Northern Division) (2 times) – with The Assassin and Dennis Condrey/Jerry Brown
  - NWA Southeastern Tag Team Championship (Southern Division) (2 times) – with Assassin #1
- World Championship Wrestling
  - NWA Austra-Asian Tag Team Championship (2 times) – with Dick Dunn
