= Wrestling Pro =

American professional wrestler (1938–2019)

Personal information
- Born: Edward Leon Baxter; June 4, 1938 Donalsonville, Georgia, U.S.
- Died: August 15, 2019 (aged 81) Dothan, Alabama, U.S.

Professional wrestling career
- Ring name(s): (The) Wrestling Pro; Tarzan Baxter; Masked Superstar #1; Masked Gaucho #1; Wrestling Pro #1; The Pro
- Billed height: 5 ft 10 in (1.78 m)
- Billed weight: 229 lb (104 kg)
- Debut: 1963
- Retired: 1978

Edward Leon Baxter (June 4, 1938 – August 15, 2019) was an American professional wrestler who competed throughout the National Wrestling Alliance in the 1960s and 70s. He was best known for wrestling under a mask as (The) Wrestling Pro and also wrestled under the ring name Tarzan Baxter. One of the most popular heels in Gulf Coast Championship Wrestling's history, he had famous feuds with the likes of Ken Mantell for the NWA World Junior Heavyweight Championship and Jack Brisco for the NWA World Heavyweight Championship.

== Professional wrestling career ==
=== Early career ===
Baxter, raised in Malone, Florida, was a veteran of the U.S. Navy (where he had also been a boxer) and was working as a deputy sheriff in Houston County, Alabama, when he began his professional wrestling career in Oklahoma under the ring name Tarzan Baxter. Under this name, he wrestled for various NWA territories in the American South, including Oklahoma, Gulf Coast, and Tennessee. Sometimes wrestling friends, like Man Lassiter, a.k.a. Night Hawk. He also pulled double duty as a member of the tag team The Masked Gauchos with Juan Sebastian for Georgia Championship Wrestling and Jim Crockett Promotions. Baxter found early success in Oklahoma, where he feuded with Danny Hodge for U.S. Junior Heavyweight Championship. He became a mainstay for the Mid-South Wrestling Association/Tri-State capturing the NWA North American Heavyweight Championship in 1969. That same year, he won the NWA United States Tag-Team Championship with Karl Karlson.

=== Becoming Wrestling Pro ===
As part of a villainous tag team, Baxter learned how to be a successful heel. By 1970 he returned to Gulf Coast Championship Wrestling as a tag team with Tim Tyler under the name "the Wrestling Pros, a masked duo managed by Joe Powell. The team eventually disbanded after his partner was unmasked. From then on, Baxter was a singles wrestler, competing as "The Wrestling Pro". It was not a secret that "Wrestling Pro" was Tarzan Baxter due to his distinctive voice.

=== NWA World Junior Heavyweight Championship ===
Wearing a white mask and costume, Pro would switch between fan favourite and villain during his time in GCCW but is best remembered for his tenure as a heel, feuding with the territories top babyfaces and facing the visiting NWA champions. Pro had a famous rivalry with champion Ken Mantell for the NWA World Junior Heavyweight Championship in the mid-1970s. Having competed in non-title bouts Pro challenged Mantell a title match, which Mantell agreed to, providing that Pro could make weight and would agree to put his mask up against the title. The bout took place on September 17, 1974.

Pro was weighed in the ring by promoter and wrestler "Cowboy" Bob Kelly before the match and made the weight. The bout concluded with the referee being "knocked out" and distracted and The Pro clearly winning the match. A second referee however came to the ring, counted out the Pro and awarded the match to Mantell. The crowd cheered loudly, wanting Pro to unmask. As he was taking his mask off, Kelly returned to the ring and stopped him. He told the crowd that he would like Pro to unmask as well, but he had to do what was right. He told the crowd that as The Pro had beaten Mantell fair and square that as far as he was concerned, Pro was the rightful NWA Junior Heavyweight Champion.

Pro was recognised and announced in the territory as the NWA World Junior Heavyweight Champion. After NWA President Sam Muschnick cut a promo on the territory's television demanding they stop referring to Pro as champion, Bob Kelly had a belt made for Pro, which was greeted was cheers of applause from the crowd when awarded to him in the ring. During the presentation, Kelly stated that The Pro will always be the champion until Mantell comes and takes it away from him. Sam Muschnick sent several more interviews to the TV Station ordering them to stop. When Kelly refused, Muschnick "sent" several wrestlers to defeat Pro, including former NWA World Heavyweight Champion Lou Thesz. When none of the wrestlers sent could defeat Wrestling Pro, Muschnick again cut a promo on television, stating he had underestimated Pro and that he would send Ken Mantell back to wrestle The Pro belt for belt to determine the undisputed champion, which Mantell eventually won. The angle drew several sold out crowd to the events to witness the match-ups between Wrestling Pro and Mantell.

=== Feud with NWA World Heavyweight Champion Jack Brisco ===
As The Wrestling Pro, Baxter remained a headliner for Gulf Coast Championship Wrestling throughout the 1970s. He feuded with then-NWA World Heavyweight Champion Jack Brisco when he was declared number one contender. During their first bout for the title it appeared that Pro had won the World Heavyweight Championship, however the referee declared that his feet were on the ropes, disqualified Pro and awarded the title back to Brisco. Due to the circumstances, they would have a re-match for the championship. Due to flight trouble, their first scheduled rematch had to be cancelled, with Pro facing Ken Lucas instead. When they did eventually have their bout, Brisco won and retained the title.

=== Murder Inc. ===
Soon thereafter, Wrestling Pro aligned with Gulf Coast's Heavyweight Champion Duke Miller and the tag-team of Gorgeous George Jr and Billy Spears to form the short-lived but innovative stable "Murder Inc". They feuded with many of the promotion's top wrestlers including Wrestling Pro's long-time rivals "Cowboy" Bob Kelly, The California Hippie Mike Boyette, The Mysterious Medic and Sweet Daddy Watts. The four man group operated with the goal of ensuring that Miller - who dressed in suits - remained Gulf Coast Champion. It would be another ten years before The Four Horsemen debuted with a similar concept.

=== Southeastern Championship Wrestling and later career ===
Baxter travelled to Tennessee and competed in Ron Fuller's Southeastern Championship Wrestling territory in 1976, where he teamed with fellow Dothan, Alabama native Dick Dunn as the team known as "The Masked Superstars", with whom he won the NWA Southern Tag Team Champion in April, 1976. Pro continued to also compete in the Gulf Coast territory, where he went on to win the NWA Gulf Coast Heavyweight Championship on nine occasions. One of his most famous rivals, Ken Mantell, returned to Gulf Coast Championship Wrestling after losing the NWA World Junior Heavyweight Championship and rekindled his rivalry with Baxter, feuding over the Gulf Coast Heavyweight Title. Baxter formed a team with "The Super Pro", a fellow masked wrestler who soon turned on him. In a mask vs. mask match, "Super Pro" lost the bout and was revealed to be Randy Rose, who would later form The Midnight Express with Norvell Austin and Dennis Condrey.

In the later stage of his career, Baxter continued to wrestle for Southeastern Championship Wrestling (who had begun promoting in the Gulf Coast), putting over up and comers Austin Idol and Terry "The Hulk" Boulder (who would later become Hulk Hogan.

=== Retirement and death ===
Baxter retired from in-ring competition around 1978. His last appearance as part of a wrestling show was in 2004 at "The Continental Reunion" event, where he - as Wrestling Pro - finally unmasked. He was known to also attend the annual Gulf Coast Wrestlers Reunions. In his retirement, Baxter was involved with the local stockyard in Dothan, Alabama. He died on August 15, 2019, at age 81.

== Championships and accomplishments ==
- National Wrestling Alliance
  - NWA World Tag Team Championship
  - NWA Gulf Coast Heavyweight Championship (nine times)
  - NWA Alabama Heavyweight Championship (six times)
  - NWA World Junior Heavyweight Championship (only recognised in Gulf Coast territory)
  - NWA United States Tag Team Championship (Gulf Coast version) (three times)
  - NWA Continental Tag Team Championship (two times)
  - NWA Gulf Coast Tag Team Championship (five times) with - Eddie Sullivan (2), Mighty Yankee (1), Duke Miller (1), and Ken Lucas (1)
- NWA Tri-State
  - UWF North American Championship
  - NWA United States Tag Team Championship (Tri-State version)
