= Armand Hussein =

American professional wrestler (1934–2007)

Personal information
- Born: Michael Barber; July 3, 1934 Houston, Texas, U.S.
- Died: December 31, 2007 (aged 73)

Professional wrestling career
- Ring name(s): Armand Hussein; Armand Hussian; Hussein the Butcher; Mike Harmon
- Billed height: 6 ft 0 in (183 cm)
- Billed weight: 231 lb (105 kg)
- Billed from: Sudan
- Debut: 1959
- Retired: 1983

Michael Barber (July 3, 1934 – December 31, 2007) was an American professional wrestler, best known by the ring name Armand Hussein or Armand Hussian, who portrayed a Sudanese character during his career.

== Professional wrestling career ==
Hussein began his wrestling career in 1959. He worked in various NWA territories. In 1966, he worked in Japan for Japan Wrestling Association. Hussein was the subject of a 1967 documentary, Sudanese Wrestler, produced for the United States Information Agency.

From 1966 to 1967, Hussian worked in New York City and the Northeast for the World Wide Wrestling Federation where he teamed a few matches with Bruno Sammartino.

In 1972, he made his debut in the Gulf Coast where he became a three-time NWA Mississippi Heavyweight Championship.

Hussein won the WWC Caribbean Heavyweight Championship in Puerto Rico, defeating Invader 1 in 1978.

In 1981, Hussein worked in his home state of Texas for World Class Championship Wrestling. Hussein formed a partnership with Gary Hart known as H & H Limited in 1982. His last match was on June 17, 1983, with Mike Bond and Tola Yatsu losing to Kamala (wrestler) in a Loser Leaves Town Handicap Match.

== Professional wrestling style and persona ==
Hussein portrayed a Sudanese character during his career. His signature moves were the "Desert Crab" and the headbutt.

== Personal life and death ==
Hussein kept his life private and never broke kayfabe. He later in life converted to Islam.

On December 31, 2007, Hussein died at 73.

== Championships and accomplishments ==
- Mid-South Wrestling
  - Mid-South North American Heavyweight Championship (Tri-State version) (1 time)
- NWA All-Star Wrestling
  - NWA Canadian Tag Team Championship (Vancouver version) (1 time) – with Abdullah the Butcher (1)
- NWA Big Time Wrestling
  - NWA American Tag Team Championship (1 time) – with Killer Tim Brooks
- NWA Gulf Coast Championship Wrestling
  - NWA Mississippi Heavyweight Championship (3 times)
- Pacific Northwest Wrestling
  - NWA Pacific Northwest Tag Team Championship (1 time) - with Shag Thomas
- World Wrestling Council
  - WWC Caribbean Heavyweight Championship (1 time)
