= Silento Rodriguez =

Mexican-American professional wrestler (1933–2024)

Personal information
- Born: David Palacios Rodriguez; May 26, 1933 Monterrey, Nuevo León, Mexico
- Died: April 7, 2024 (aged 90) Texas, U.S.

Professional wrestling career
- Ring names: Silento Rodriguez; Sordomudo Rodriguez
- Debut: 1951
- Retired: 1977

David Palacios Rodriguez (May 26, 1933 – April 7, 2024), known by the ring name Silento Rodriguez, was a Mexican-American professional wrestler. He wrestled in the Mexican promotion Empresa Mexicana de Lucha Libre (EMLL) and the territories of the National Wrestling Alliance (NWA), having wrestled NWA-affiliated promotions such as Houston Wrestling, Western States Sports, Gulf Coast Championship Wrestling, and NWA Tri-State.

== Professional wrestling career ==
Rodriguez made his professional debut in 1951. In 1959, he joined Houston Wrestling, where he won the Texas Junior Heavyweight Championship, a title he held five times. He also held the NWA Texas Junior Heavyweight Championship. In Gulf Coast Championship Wrestling, he held the NWA Gulf Coast Heavyweight Championship three times and the NWA Southern Tag Team Championship at least once.

== Personal life and death ==
Rodriguez had lost his hearing at age three after an accident from diving from a cliff, which inspired his ring name. He also had lost his voice. He lived in Texas and died on April 7, 2024. He was 90 and was survived by a son.

== Championships and accomplishments ==
- Gulf Coast Championship Wrestling

- NWA Gulf Coast Heavyweight Championship (3 times)
- NWA Southern Tag Team Championship (Gulf Coast version) (1 time) - with Ramon Torres

- NWA Rocky Mountain
  - NWA Rocky Mountain Heavyweight Championship (1 time)
- Southwest Sports

- NWA Texas Junior Heavyweight Championship (1 time)
- Texas Junior Heavyweight Championship (5 times)
