= Bob Boyer (wrestler) =

Canadian professional wrestler (1932–2026)

Personal information
- Born: Robert Boyer; September 25, 1932 Toronto, Canada
- Died: January 4, 2026 (aged 93) Zionsville, Indiana, U.S.

Professional wrestling career
- Ring name(s): Bob Boyer; Bobby Bold Eagle
- Billed weight: 229 lb (104 kg)
- Debut: circa 1957
- Retired: 1987

Robert Gerald Boyer (September 25, 1932 – January 4, 2026) was a Canadian professional wrestler. He wrestled under the ring name, Bobby Bold Eagle for over 10 years in Indianapolis, Indiana under Dick the Bruiser's World Wrestling Association and the early years of the World Wide Wrestling Federation in the 1960s.

Boyer died at his home in Zionsville, Indiana, on January 4, 2026, at the age of 93.

== Championships and accomplishments ==
- Gulf Coast Championship Wrestling
  - NWA Mississippi Heavyweight Championship (1 time)
  - NWA Alabama Heavyweight Championship (2 times)
- National Wrestling Alliance
  - NWA Texas Junior Heavyweight Championship (1 time)
- Georgia Championship Wrestling
  - NWA United States Junior Heavyweight Championship (1 time)
