= Mike Boyette =

American professional wrestler (1943–2012)

Personal information
- Born: Michael Bowyer; April 24, 1941 Tucson, Arizona, U.S.
- Died: December 6, 2012 (aged 71) Alabama, U.S.
- Cause of death: Colon cancer
- Children: Kristi Bowyer; Lance Bowyer; Steve Bowyer

Professional wrestling career
- Ring name(s): Mike Boyette; The California Hippie; Hollywood Hippie; Hippie Boyette; Grenade Boyer; Grenade Bowyer; The Beastman; Apocalypse
- Billed from: San Diego, California
- Trained by: Eddie Sharkey; Verne Gagne
- Debut: 1966
- Retired: 1988

Michael Bowyer (April 24, 1941 – December 6, 2012), also known by the ring name Mike "The California Hippie" Boyette, was an American professional wrestler, who made his debut in 1966.

== Early life ==
Boyette was born in Tucson, Arizona. Prior to his career in wrestling, he became a judo champion while serving in the United States Marines and earned a place in the 1964 Olympic team in Tokyo, but broke his leg and had to give up his spot.

== Professional wrestling career ==
In 1966, Boyette began his wrestling career and was trained by Eddie Sharkey and Verne Gagne. He became second in all three United States Tag Team title competitions. In the early 80's he was given a push in Southwest Championship Wrestling as Grenade Boyer, a heel character who could "explode" at any time. The character was not popular and Boyette was relegated to jobber. In 1985, Boyette wrestled in the Universal Wrestling Federation and had a total of 197 losses.

Boyette died in Alabama, survived by his daughter Kristi Bowyer and 2 sons, Lance & Steve. He had 7 grandchildren & 4 great grandchildren.

== Championships and accomplishments ==
- Gulf Coast Championship Wrestling
  - NWA Gulf Coast Heavyweight Championship (4 times)
  - NWA Mississippi Heavyweight Championship (1 time)
  - NWA Gulf Coast Tag Team Championship (3 times) – with Bearcat Brown, Frank Dalton and Ken Lucas
  - NWA United States Tag Team Championship (8 times) – with Cowboy Bob Kelly, Ken Lucas, Calvin Pullins (2), Mickey Doyle (2) and The Wrestling Pro (2)
- NWA Mid-America
  - NWA Mid-America Heavyweight Championship (1 time)
  - City of Mobile Heavyweight Championship (2 times)
  - NWA Tri-State Tag Team Championship (Alabama version) (1 time) – with Mickey Doyle
