= NWA Mississippi Tag Team Championship (Gulf Coast version) =

Professional wrestling tag team championship

Details
- Promotion: Gulf Coast Championship Wrestling
- Date established: 1968
- Date retired: No later than March 1973
Statistics
- First champions: The Interns (Joe Turner and Bill Bowman)
- Final champions: Bob Kelly and Frank Dalton
- Most reigns: Bob Kelly and Frank Dalton/Bob Kelly and Bobby Fields (2)
- Longest reign: Too uncertain to determine
- Shortest reign: Too uncertain to determine

The NWA Mississippi Tag Team Championship was a professional wrestling tag team championship in Gulf Coast Championship Wrestling (GCCW). A secondary title complementing the NWA Gulf Coast Tag Team Championship, it was one of many state tag team championships recognized by the National Wrestling Alliance.

Some reigns were held by champions using a ring name, while others used their real name. There have been a total of 13 recognized individual champions and 8 recognized teams, who have had a combined 10 official reigns. The first champions were The Interns (Joe Turner and Bill Bowman), and the final champions were "Cowboy" Bob Kelly and Frank Dalton. At 60 days, Kelly and Dalton's first reign was the longest, while the team of Rip Tyler and Eduardo Perez's first reign was the shortest, at less than two weeks.

The team of Bob Kelly and Frank Dalton and the team of Bob Kelly and Bobby Fields are tied with the most reigns as champions, with two each. Kelly has the most individual reigns with four. The following is a chronological list of teams that have been Mississippi Tag Team Champions by ring name.

== Title history ==
Key
| No. | Overall reign number |
| Reign | Reign number for the specific team—reign numbers for the individuals are in parentheses, if different |
| Days | Number of days held |

| No. | Champion | Championship change | | | Reign statistics | | Notes | Ref. |
| No. | Champion | Date | Event | Location | Reign | Days | Notes | Ref. |
|---|---|---|---|---|---|---|---|---|
| 1 | The Interns (Joe Turner and Bill Bowman) | 1968 | GCCW show | N/A | 1 | N/A | | |
Championship history is unrecorded from 1968 to 1971.
| — | Vacated | 1971 | — | — | — | — | Championship vacated for unknown reasons. A 5-team tournament is held in Laurel, Mississippi on May 31, 1971, however, the winners are unknown. The tournament final may have been between the team of Bob Kelly and Frank Dalton versus Eddie Sullivan and Jack Morrell on June 7, 1971. | |
Championship history is unrecorded from 1971 to September, 1971 (NLT).
| 2 | Rip Tyler and Eduardo Perez | September, 1971 (NLT) | GCCW show | N/A | 1 | (Note: The exact date on which the title was won is not known, which means their title reign lasted between 1 and 15 days.) | | |
| 3 | Bob Kelly and Frank Dalton | September 16, 1971 | GCCW show | Hattiesburg, MS | 1 | 60 | | |
| 4 | Eddie Sullivan and Prince Pullings | November 15, 1971 | GCCW show | Laurel, MS | 1 | (Note: The exact date on which the title was lost is not known, which means their title reign lasted between 1 and 80 days.) | | |
Championship history is unrecorded from November 15, 1971 to February, 1972 (NLT).
| 5 | Bob Kelly (2) and Bobby Fields | February, 1972 (NLT) | GCCW show | N/A | 1 | N/A | | |
Championship history is unrecorded from February, 1972 (NLT) to March, 1972 (NLT).
| 7 | Billy Red Lyons and Tom Jones | March, 1972 (NLT) | GCCW show | N/A | 1 | N/A | | |
Championship history is unrecorded from March, 1972 (NLT) to March, 1972 (NLT).
| 8 | Bob Kelly (3) and Bobby Fields | March, 1972 (NLT) | GCCW show | N/A | 2 | N/A | | |
Championship history is unrecorded from March, 1972 (NLT) to April, 1972 (NLT).
| 9 | Rip Tyler (2) and Don Fargo/Eddie Sullivan (2) | April, 1972 (NLT) | GCCW show | N/A | 1 | N/A | Don Fargo left GCCW in December 1972. Rip Tyler chose Eddie Sullivan as his replacement partner. | |
Championship history is unrecorded from April, 1972 (NLT) to March, 1973 (NLT).
| 10 | Bob Kelly (4) and Frank Dalton | March, 1973 (NLT) | GCCW show | N/A | 2 | N/A | | |
