= Mario Galento =

American wrestler

Personal information
- Born: Bonnie Lee Boyette; June 17, 1915 Tennessee, U.S.
- Died: January 6, 1989 (aged 73)

Professional wrestling career
- Ring name(s): Mario Galento; Aztec Garica; Butch Boyette; Dixie Rebel; Masked Flash; Joe Boyette; Black Scorpion; Mario Gardino; Maurice Boyette; Wild Rebel
- Billed height: 6 ft 2 in (188 cm)
- Billed weight: 251 lb (114 kg)
- Trained by: Al Galento
- Debut: 1950
- Retired: 1974

Bonnie Lee Boyette (June 17, 1915 – January 6, 1989) was an American actor and professional wrestler who worked as Mario Galento mainly in Tennessee, Georgia and the Gulf Coast during the 1950s and 1960s. He also competed as Butch Boyette.

== Professional wrestling career ==
Galento would make his debut working for the Welch family in Tennessee. He served in the US Navy Seabees from 1942 to 1945 during World War II. He returned to wrestling in 1950.

During his career, he mainly worked in Tennessee and the Gulf Coast. He won the NWA Gulf Coast Heavyweight Championship six times from 1957 to 1968 and the NWA United States Junior Heavyweight Championship in Georgia five times from 1965 to 1966.

In 1973, Jerry Jarrett had once just finished a thirty-minute match with Jerry Lawler when he was knocked down after being hit in the back of the head. He thought he was hit by Lawler's manager, Sam Bass, until he noticed it was Galento. Jarrett was trained by noted shooter Sailor Moran, who gave him advice on what to do in a real fight. Drawing on that knowledge, Jarrett would attempt to pluck out Galento's left eyeball (despite rumors to the contrary, Galento did not lose his eye). Lawler and Jarrett then continued to beat on Galento until he left the ringside area. However, Galento came back with a nightstick, but Jarrett caught him, took the nightstick and began beating him again. Galento escaped the ring and went behind promoter Roy Welch. Jarrett suspected that Welch had put Galento up to this, as he believed Jarrett was trying to take over the business. Jarrett then attempted to hit Welch with the nightstick, but was stopped by several wrestlers. Galento's left eye was closed over, the other eye badly swollen and bruised, and he had deep gashes on his forehead. It required two hundred stitches to close his wounds.

Weeks later, Lawler was wrestling in Batesville, Mississippi when he was struck from behind as Jarrett had been. Lawler saw Galento was carrying a straight razor, and accompanied by his wife. Lawler rolled out of the ring, threw a chair, and ran to the locker room. After telling the boys what had happened, fellow wrestler Jimmy Valiant reached into his bag and pulled out a hand gun. As Galento entered, Valiant pointed the gun at his head. Galento dropped the razor, after which the sheriff of Panola County, Mississippi (who was in the audience) came in to see what had transpired. Galento, Lawler, and Valiant were arrested by the police, with Lawler and Valiant being the only ones who returned to wrestling.

Galento wrestled his last match in 1974.

== Personal life ==
After retiring from wrestling Galento trained wrestler Ken Wayne and later owned Mario's Pizza and Italian Restaurant in Marietta, Georgia.

== Death ==
Galento died from liver cancer on January 6, 1989, at 73.

== Championships and accomplishments ==
- Georgia Championship Wrestling
  - NWA United States Junior Heavyweight Championship (5 times)
- NWA Gulf Coast Championship Wrestling
  - NWA Mississippi Heavyweight Championship (6 times)
- Western States Sports
  - NWA Western States Tag Team Championship (1 time) – with Sputnik Monroe

== Filmography ==
=== Movies ===
Year	Film	Role	Notes
1960	Natchez Trace	Turner	
1956	Frontier Woman	Blackjack	
