= Rocket Monroe =

American professional wrestler (1937–2018)

Personal information
- Born: Maury High; March 17, 1941 Memphis, Tennessee, U.S.
- Died: June 7, 2010 (aged 69) Atlanta, Georgia

Professional wrestling career
- Ring name(s): Rocket Monroe; TNT Monroe; Rick Monroe; Rocky Monroe; Rocky Montez; Rock Montez; Masked Godfather #2; Maury High
- Trained by: Tex Hager
- Debut: 1960
- Retired: 1979

Maury High (March 17, 1941 – June 7, 2010), better known by his ring name Rocket Monroe, was an American professional wrestler. A major star in the Southern United States, High was best known for his successful tag team with younger "brother" Sputnik Monroe. He also had notable stints in the American Wrestling Association, Georgia Championship Wrestling and Gulf Coast Championship Wrestling as a singles wrestler. He was the last surviving member of the Monroe wrestling family.

== Professional wrestling career ==
Monroe made his debut in 1960. He started to team up with Sputnik Monroe and won many tag titles. Later he teamed up with his other "brother" Flash.

Monroe passed away on June 7, 2010, from kidney and blood infection at 69.

== Championships and accomplishments ==
- Championship Wrestling from Florida
  - NWA World Tag Team Championship (Florida version) (2 times) – with Sputnik Monroe
  - NWA Florida Southern Tag Team Championship (1 time) – with Sputnik Monroe
- Gulf Coast Championship Wrestling
  - NWA Gulf Coast Heavyweight Championship (3 times)
  - NWA Alabama Heavyweight Championship (2 times)
  - NWA Arkansas Heavyweight Championship (1 time)
  - NWA Mississippi Heavyweight Championship (6 times)
  - NWA City of Mobile Heavyweight Championship (1 time)
  - NWA Gulf Coast Tag Team Championship (7 times) – with Flash Monroe (6) and Don Carson
  - NWA United States Tag Team Championship (Gulf Coast version) (4 times) – with Flash Monroe (2), Norvell Austin and Cowboy Bob Kelly
- Mid-South Sports
  - NWA Southeastern Tag Team Championship (Georgia version) - with Flash Monroe
  - NWA Macon Tag Team Championship (2 times) - with Flash Monroe and Skandor Akbar (1 time)
- NWA Mid-America
  - NWA Southern Junior Heavyweight Championship (2 times)
  - NWA Mid-America Tag Team Championship (1 time) – with Randy Tyler
  - NWA United States Tag Team Championship (Mid-America version) – with Randy Tyler
- Southwest Sports, Inc.
  - NWA Texas Tag Team Championship (1 times) – with Sputnik Monroe (1)
