= Eduardo Perez (wrestler) =

American professional wrestler (1928–1989)

Personal information
- Born: Eduardo Miguel Perez; 1928 Tampa, Florida, USA, U.S.
- Died: September 7, 1989

Professional wrestling career
- Ring names: The Bomber; Chico Pérez; Edouardo Perez; Ed Pérez; Eduardo Perez; Eduardo Rocca Pérez; The Good Doctor; Magnífico Pérez; Rocca Pérez; Rocco Pérez; Rocky Perez
- Debut: 1951
- Retired: 1979

Eduardo Miguel Perez (1928 – September 7, 1989) was an American professional wrestler. Known as a hybrid wrestler, one of the first competitors who combined elements of the Mexican lucha libre wrestling style with a strong background in the catch wrestling mat based style. Known by avid fans as a wrestler who was vastly underrated and relatively unknown, primarily due to taking long breaks from the business throughout his career. Born in Florida to wealthy Mexican immigrant parents, Perez's short stays in various regional territories never vaulted him to the superstar status that many felt he deserved.

== Professional wrestling career ==
Perez wrestled intermittently throughout Texas, Florida, the Midwest, Canada, and California regions from the early-1950ss to the late-1970s. He often wrestled under different ring names and personas, the most noted and frequent of which being "Red Ranchero" - a nickname given to him by announcer John Shaybach in reference to his trademark red hair.

Known as somewhat of a legitimate "tough guy" shootfighter outside of the ring, Perez was reputedly one of the few men who escaped the notorious submission "sugar hold" of Stu Hart in his famed basement training facility, "The Dungeon" during a short stay in the Calgary, Alberta, Canada promotion. This was confirmed by former pro wrestling star Superstar Billy Graham who was training at the gym during the late 1960s.

Perez had a brief but successful stint with Bob Geigel's Central States promotion, which saw Perez unsuccessfully challenge Danny Little Bear for the promotion's regional title in Kansas City and feud with Black Angus Campbell.

Perez was also involved in an incident after a match with Omar Atlas in Leavenworth, Kansas. At a post match meal at Homer's Burgers, Perez was confronted, and stabbed by a fan who was upset with his tactics during the show. Perez was taken to St. Mary's Hospital in Lansing, Kansas where he eventually recovered from a tension pneumothorax, resulting from a collapsed lung. He successfully returned to the ring 3 months later where he took on Roger Kirby.

Perez became disenchanted with the business when he had a confrontation with Southern promoter Jim Barnett. Perez had just arrived in the area, and quit the promotion before wrestling a single match for promoter Barnett. Perez left the business for good, and returned to the Florida area. After retiring from pro wrestling, Perez opened a nightclub in the Miami, Florida area.

Perez died on September 7, 1989.

== Championships and accomplishment ==
- Gulf Coast Championship Wrestling
  - NWA Gulf Coast Heavyweight Championship (3 times)
  - NWA Mississippi Tag Team Championship (Gulf Coast version) (1 time) - with Rip Tyler
- NWA Mid America
  - NWA Southern Tag Team Championship (Mid-America version) (1 time) - with Red Roberts
