= Ricky Gibson (wrestler) =

American professional wrestler (1952–2006)

Personal information
- Born: Richard Cain; November 19, 1952 Pensacola, Florida, U.S.
- Died: September 15, 2006 (aged 53)
- Cause of death: Heart attack

Professional wrestling career
- Ring name: Rick Gibson
- Billed height: 5"10
- Billed weight: 220 lb (100 kg)
- Debut: 1970
- Retired: 1987

Richard Earl Cain (November 19, 1952 – September 15, 2006) was an American professional wrestler.

== Professional wrestling career ==
Gibson made his wrestling debut in 1970 working in Alabama and worked with Lee Fields. In 1975, he did a tour for All Japan Pro Wrestling.

Gibson trained his brother Robert Gibson who made his debut in 1977 and teamed together winning many tag team titles mainly in Continental Wrestling Association in Tennessee.

In 1982, Gibson was in a car accident and spent 39 days in intensive care.

In 1983, the brothers disbanded when Robert went on to form the Rock 'n' Roll Express with Ricky Morton. Gibson would work in the AWA, and Mid-South.

In 1986, he wrestled as Ricky Lee Jones in the Mid-Atlantic. His last match was in 1987 against Ric Flair.

== Death ==
Gibson died on September 15, 2006, of a heart attack at 53. The WWE acknowledged Ricky's death on WWE.com.

== Championships and accomplishments ==
- NWA Mid-America / Continental Wrestling Association / Championship Wrestling Association
  - AWA Southern Tag Team Championship (5 times) – with Robert Gibson (3)
- Gulf Coast Championship Wrestling
  - NWA Alabama Heavyweight Championship (7 times)
  - NWA United States Tag Team Championship (Gulf Coast version) (1 time) – with Robert Gibson
- Southeastern Championship Wrestling
  - NWA Tennessee Tag Team Championship (1 time) – with Bunkhouse Buck
- NWA Mid-America / Continental Wrestling Association / Championship Wrestling Association
  - NWA Mid-America Tag Team Championship (1 time) – with Bill Dundee
