= Ken Lucas (wrestler) =

American professional wrestler (1940–2014)

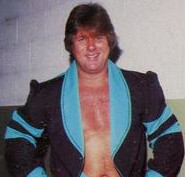
- Lucas, c. 1979

Personal information
- Born: August 20, 1940 Mesa, Arizona, U.S.
- Died: August 6, 2014 (aged 73) Pensacola, Florida, U.S.

Professional wrestling career
- Ring name: Ken Lucas
- Billed height: 6 ft 0 in (183 cm)
- Billed weight: 249 lb (113 kg)
- Billed from: Mesa, Arizona
- Debut: 1960
- Retired: 1985

Ken Lucas (August 20, 1940 – August 6, 2014) was an American professional wrestler who won many tag and singles championships in the southern US National Wrestling Alliance territories between 1960 and 1985, before finishing his career as a jobber in the American Wrestling Association. He trained Ricky Morton to wrestle, and they teamed often in the early 1980s, winning three championships six times. He was from Mesa, Arizona and died at his home in Pensacola, Florida.

== Professional wrestling career ==
=== Tucson (1960–1964) ===
Ken Lucas began his career in 1960 for Monte LaDue's territory in Tucson, Arizona. In May 1962, he won his first title, the NWA Western States Tag Team Championship, with "Iron" Mike DiBiase. He won two more with Hans Steiner in 1963, before leaving the Tucson area in 1964. During his time in Tucson, he also made stops in Pittsburgh, Hawaii, and Denver.

=== Western States Sports (1963–1965, 1977) ===
During his last days in Tucson in 1963, Lucas made a stop in Amarillo, Texas, working for Dory Funk Sr.'s Western States Sports promotion. He remained in the area until 1965. He would also wrestle briefly in Fort Worth.

=== Tri-State (1964–1979) ===
In 1964, Lucas went to the NWA Tri-State territory of Louisiana, Mississippi, and Oklahoma, working for Leroy McGuirk. He spent fifteen years in the area, before Bill Watts took the reins in 1979. During his tenure there, Lucas held two NWA Louisiana Heavyweight Championships and four NWA Mississippi Heavyweight Championships, among other titles.

=== Gulf Coast Championship Wrestling (1964–1984) ===
Lucas went to the Gulf Coast area in 1964, and competed in the area, on and off, for over two decades. During that time, he would hold eleven NWA Gulf Coast Heavyweight Championships, fifteen NWA Gulf Coast Tag Team Championships with eleven different partners, five NWA Alabama Heavyweight Championships, two NWA City of Mobile Heavyweight Championships, and two NWA United States Junior Heavyweight Championships, among other titles.

=== Georgia Championship Wrestling (1965–1966, 1969) ===
Lucas went to Georgia Championship Wrestling in 1965. He would spend two years in the area, before leaving in 1967. He would briefly return to the area in 1969.

=== NWA Mid-America / Championship Wrestling Association (1968–1981) ===
Lucas joined the NWA Mid-America area ran by Nick Gulas in 1968. When Jerry Jarrett broke away from Gulas to form the Championship Wrestling Association in Memphis, he went back and forth between Nashville and Memphis for three years until Gulas's promotion closed in 1980. He won several Tag Team Championships within the area and one NWA Mid-America Heavyweight Championship.

=== Championship Wrestling from Florida (1976) ===
Lucas made a stop in Florida in 1976, working for Championship Wrestling from Florida. While there, he held two NWA Florida Tag Team Championships with Mike Graham.

=== NWA Central States (1978) ===
Lucas made a brief stop in the NWA Central States area in Kansas City in 1978. While there, he held one NWA Central States Heavyweight Championship and one NWA World Tag Team Championship with Kevin Sullivan.

=== Southwest Championship Wrestling (1982–1984) ===
After wrestling for the NWA for over two decades, Lucas went back to Texas for Southwest Championship Wrestling in 1982. While there, he won two Tag Team Championships with Ricky Morton, whom Lucas trained four years earlier in Tennessee.

=== American Wrestling Association (1984–1985) ===
In 1984, Lucas joined the American Wrestling Association in Minneapolis. By this time, Lucas was winding down his career, so he was mainly used as a jobber. After a year with the AWA, Lucas retired after 25 years in the ring, though he would perform on small independent events later into his life.

== Retirement and death ==
After retiring, Lucas became a fixture at the T&W Flea Market, where he would sell hats and other items. He died at home in Pensacola, Florida on August 6, 2014, aged 73.

== Professional wrestling style and persona ==
Lucas' signature moves were the abdominal stretch, powerslam, and sleeper hold.

== Championships and accomplishments ==
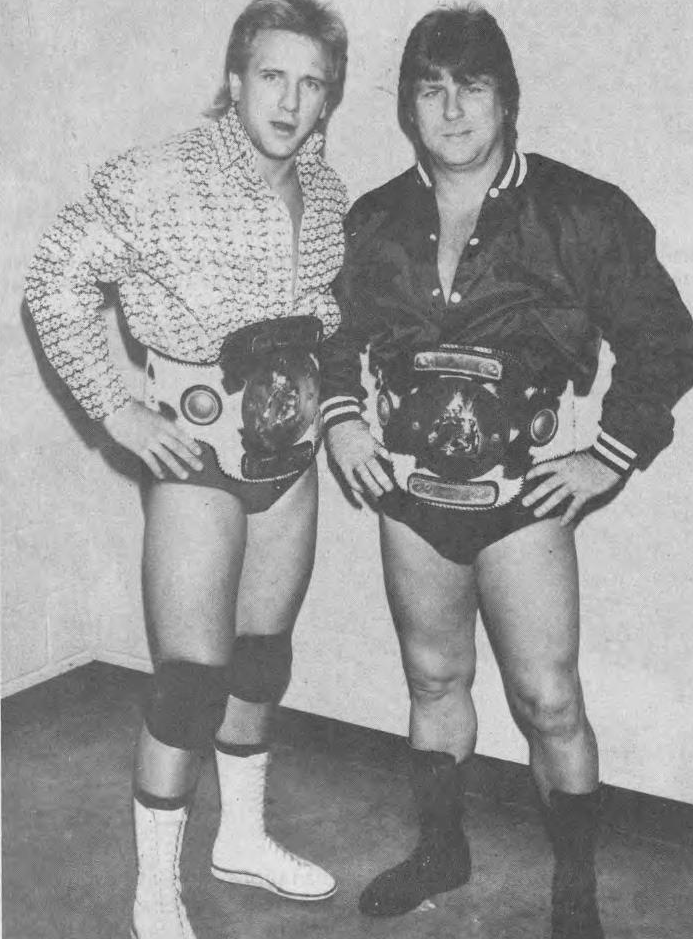
Lucas (right) and Ricky Morton (left) as NWA Mid-America Tag Team Champions, c. 1983

- Central States Wrestling
  - NWA Central States Heavyweight Championship (1 time)
  - NWA World Tag Team Championship (Central States version) (1 time) – with Kevin Sullivan
- Gulf Coast Championship Wrestling
  - NWA Alabama Heavyweight Championship (7 times)
  - NWA Louisiana Heavyweight Championship (2 times)
  - NWA Mississippi Heavyweight Championship (4 times)
  - NWA Southern Tag Team Championship (4 times) – with Chris Lucas
  - NWA Gulf Coast Tag Team Championship (15 times) – with Bobby Fields, Dennis Hall, Chris Lucas, Don Carson, Mac MacFarland, Johnny West, Mike Boyette, Nick Kozak and Gorgeous George Jr.
  - NWA Southeastern Tag Team Championship (4 times) - with Kevin Sullivan, Bob Armstrong, and Eddie Hogan
  - NWA Southeastern Heavyweight Championship (11 times)
  - NWA Southeastern United States Junior Heavyweight Championship (3 times)
  - NWA United States Tag Team Championship (Gulf Coast version) (4 times) – with Mike Boyette, Johnny West, Bob Kelly and Dennis Hall
- NWA Mid-America
  - AWA Southern Tag Team Championship (13 times) - with Dennis Hall, Johnny Walker, Billy Robinson, and Ricky Morton
  - NWA Mid-America Heavyweight Championship (1 time)
  - NWA Mid-America Tag Team Championship (7 times) - with Frankie Laine, Tommy Rich, Ray Candy, Dutch Mantel, George Gulas, and Ricky Morton
  - NWA World Tag Team Championship (Mid-America version) (1 time) - with Frankie Laine
