= NWA Southeastern Heavyweight Championship (Southern Division) =

Professional wrestling championship

NWA Southeastern Heavyweight Championship (Southern division)
- The NWA Gulf Coast Heavyweight Championship belt.

Details
- Promotion: Gulf Coast Championship Wrestling
- Date established: May 22, 1957
- Date retired: May 4, 1980

Other name
- NWA Gulf Coast Heavyweight Championship
Statistics
- First champion: Eduardo Perez
- Final champion: Mongolian Stomper
- Most reigns: Ken Lucas (11 reigns)

The NWA Southeastern Heavyweight Championship (Southern Division) was originally the primary singles championship for Gulf Coast Championship Wrestling and was originally named the NWA Gulf Coast Heavyweight Championship. As the name indicates the title was recognized by the National Wrestling Alliance as a local title promoted in the Tennessee, Alabama, Florida and Mississippi region from 1957 until 1977 when its name was changed for the Southern Division of Southeast Championship Wrestling. In 1980 the title was abandoned and the Northern division of the NWA Southeastern Heavyweight Championship became the main title of SECW.

== Title history ==
Key
No.	Overall reign number
Reign	Reign number for the specific champion
Days	Number of days held

No.	Champion	Championship change			Reign statistics		Notes	Ref.
No.	Champion	Date	Event	Location	Reign	Days	Notes	Ref.
NWA Gulf Coast Heavyweight Championship
1	Eduardo Perez	May 22, 1957	GCCW show	Mobile, AL	1	77	Defeated Lee Fields in 14-man tournament final.	
2	Mario Galento	August 7, 1957	GCCW show	Mobile, AL	1	154		
3	Yvon Roberre	January 8, 1958	GCCW show	Mobile, AL	1	41		
4	Mario Galento	February 18, 1958	GCCW show	Mobile, AL	2	135		
5	Buddy Fuller	July 3, 1958	GCCW show	Hattiesburg, MS	1	76		
6	Billy Wicks	September 17, 1958	GCCW show	Lafayette, LA	1	56		
7	Gorgeous George	November 12, 1958	GCCW show	Mobile, AL	1	7		
8	Billy Wicks	November 19, 1958	GCCW show	Mobile, AL	2	35		
9	Lee Fields	December 24, 1958	GCCW show	Mobile, AL	1	8		
10	Billy Wicks	January 1, 1959	GCCW show	Mobile, AL	3	76		
11	Papa Pasquale	March 18, 1959	GCCW show	Mobile, AL	1	119		
12	The Mighty Yankee	July 15, 1959	GCCW show	Mobile, AL	1	84		
13	Lee Fields	October 7, 1959	GCCW show	Mobile, AL	2	N/A		
—	Vacated	1959	GCCW show	—	—	—	Lee Fields bought the Gulf Coast promotion and vacated the championship	
14	Billy Wicks	December 8, 1959	GCCW show	Pensacola, FL	4	37	Defeated Pancho Villa in tournament final.	
15	Yvon Roberre	January 14, 1960	GCCW show	Mobile, AL	2	20		
16	Mario Galento	February 3, 1960	GCCW show	Mobile, AL	3	42		
17	Joe McCarthy	March 16, 1960	GCCW show	Mobile, AL	1	48		
18	Joe Scarpa	May 3, 1960	GCCW show	Pensacola, FL	1	113		
19	Eric Pederson	August 24, 1960	GCCW show	Mobile, AL	1	14		
—	Vacated	September 7, 1960	—	—	—	—	Eric Penderson left the company	
20	Jose Lothario	November 15, 1960	GCCW show	Pensacola, FL	1	15	Defeated Pancho Villa in tournament final.	
21	Pancho Villa	November 30, 1960	GCCW show	Mobile, AL	1	13		
22	Lee Fields	December 13, 1960	GCCW show	Pensacola, FL	3	15		
23	Pancho Villa	December 28, 1960	GCCW show	Mobile, AL	2	35		
24	Mario Galento	February 1, 1961	GCCW show	Mobile, AL	4	150		
—	Vacated	July 1, 1961	—	—	—	—	Mario Galento left the company.	
25	Jerry Graham	July 19, 1961	GCCW show	Mobile, AL	1	35	Defeated Chief Little Eagle in tournament final.	
26	Dick Dunn	August 23, 1961	GCCW show	Mobile, AL	1	28		
27	Chief Little Eagle	September 20, 1961	GCCW show	Mobile, AL	2	42		
—	Vacated	November 1, 1961	—	—	—	—	Chief Little Eagle left the company	
—	Deactivated	N/A	—	—	—	—		
28	Jan Madrid	October 2, 1962	GCCW show	Pensacola, FL	1	225	Defeated Don Fields in tournament final; vacates on February 1, 1963	
29	Rocket Monroe	May 15, 1963	GCCW show	Mobile, AL	1	70	Defeated Pancho Villa and Joe Scarpa in 3-man match.	
30	Mario Galento	July 24, 1963	GCCW show	Mobile, AL	5	21	Won by forfeit when Monroe gets flu.	
31	Rocket Moroe	August 14, 1963	GCCW show	Mobile, AL	2	7		
32	Silento Rodriguez	August 21, 1963	GCCW show	Mobile, AL	1	63		
33	Mickey Sharpe	October 23, 1963	GCCW show	Mobile, AL	1	30	Won by forfeit when Rodriguez injured.	
34	Billy Hines	November 22, 1963	GCCW show	Dothan, AL	1	39		
—	Vacated	December 31, 1963	—	—	—	—	Bily Hines left the company	
35	Dick Dunn	March 18, 1964	GCCW show	N/A	2	16	Was awarded the championship	
36	Don Duffy	April 3, 1964	GCCW show	Dothan, AL	1	54		
37	Ken Lucas	May 27, 1964	GCCW show	Mobile, AL	1	107		
38	Mickey Sharpe	September 11, 1964	GCCW show	Dothan, AL	2	5		
39	Silento Rodriguez	September 16, 1964	GCCW show	Mobile, AL	2	21		
40	Chin Lee	October 7, 1964	GCCW show	Mobile, AL	1	−16		
41	Silento Rodriguez	September 21, 1964	GCCW show	Mobile, AL	3	41		
—	Vacated	November 1, 1964	—	—	—	—	Silento Rodriguez left the company.	
42	The Mighty Yankee	December 9, 1964	GCCW show	N/A	2	35	Was awarded the championship	
43	Dick Dunn	January 13, 1965	GCCW show	Mobile, AL	2	30		
44	Chin Lee	February 12, 1965	GCCW show	Mobile, AL	2	−287		
—	Vacated	May 1, 1964	—	—	—	—	Chin Lee left the company	
45	Ken Lucas	June 23, 1965	GCCW show	N/A	2	69	Was awarded the championship	
46	Don Carson	August 31, 1965	GCCW show	Pensacola, FL	1	16		
47	Dick Dunn	September 16, 1965	GCCW show	Dothan, AL	4	41		
48	Danny McShain	October 27, 1965	GCCW show	Mobile, AL	1	35		
49	Ken Lucas	December 1, 1965	GCCW show	Mobile, AL	3	77		
50	Eduardo Perez	February 16, 1966	GCCW show	Mobile, AL	2	49		
51	Chief Little Eagle	April 6, 1966	GCCW show	Mobile, AL	3	104		
52	Ramon Torres	July 19, 1966	GCCW show	Pensacola, FL	1	8		
53	Dick Dunn	July 27, 1966	GCCW show	Mobile, AL	5	7		
54	Ramon Torres	August 3, 1966	GCCW show	Mobile, AL	2	47		
55	Don Carson	September 19, 1966	GCCW show	Panama City, FL	2	25		
56	Bobby Fields	October 14, 1966	GCCW show	Dothan, AL	1	14		
57	Maxie York	October 28, 1966	GCCW show	Dothan, AL	1	8		
58	Bobby Fields	November 5, 1966	GCCW show	Dothan, AL	2	277		
59	The Ox	August 9, 1967	GCCW show	Mobile, AL	1	12		
60	Bobby Fields	August 21, 1967	GCCW show	Panama City, FL	3	81		
61	Don Carson	November 10, 1967	GCCW show	Dothan, AL	3	32		
62	Dick Dunn	December 12, 1967	GCCW show	Panama City, FL	6	20		
—	Vacated	January 1, 1968	—	—	—	—	Dick Dunn left the company	
63	Eduardo Perez	February 16, 1968	GCCW show	N/A	3	47	Was awarded the championship	
64	Mario Galento	April 3, 1968	GCCW show	Mobile, AL	6	5		
65	Rocket Monroe	April 8, 1968	GCCW show	Mobile, AL	1	81		
66	Greg Peterson	June 28, 1968	GCCW show	Dothan, AL	1	82		
67	Flash Monroe	September 18, 1968	GCCW show	Mobile, AL	1	40		
68	Dick Dunn	October 28, 1968	GCCW show	Panama City, FL	7	30		
69	Flash Monroe	November 27, 1968	GCCW show	Mobile, AL	2	7		
70	Jose Villa	December 4, 1968	GCCW show	Mobile, AL	1	7		
71	Don Carson	December 11, 1968	GCCW show	Mobile, AL	4	65		
72	Bobby Fields	February 14, 1969	GCCW show	Dothan, AL	4	5		
—	Deactivated	February 19, 1969	—	—	—	—		
73	The Mysterious Medic	July 1, 1970	GCCW show	Mobile, AL	1	7	Defeated Bob Kelly in a special duration match.	
74	Bob Kelly	July 8, 1970	GCCW show	Mobile, AL	1	119		
75	The Wrestling Pro	November 4, 1970	GCCW show	Mobile, AL	1	42		
76	Bob Kelly	December 16, 1970	GCCW show	Mobile, AL	2	7	Won as the "Masked Intruder"	
77	Mike Boyette	December 23, 1970	GCCW show	Mobile, AL	1	21	Defeated Kelly in battle royal.	
78	Bob Kelly	January 13, 1971	GCCW show	Mobile, AL	3	46		
79	The Wrestling Pro	February 28, 1971	GCCW show	Pensacola, FL	2	28		
80	Bob Kelly	March 28, 1971	GCCW show	Pensacola, FL	4	59		
81	Rip Tyler	May 26, 1971	GCCW show	Mobile, AL	1	21		
82	Bob Kelly	June 16, 1971	GCCW show	Mobile, AL	5	42		
83	Donnie Fargo	July 28, 1971	GCCW show	Mobile, AL	1	70		
84	Ken Lucas	October 6, 1971	GCCW show	Mobile, AL	4	20		
85	The Wrestling Pro	October 26, 1971	GCCW show	Mobile, AL	3	36		
86	Donnie Fargo	December 1, 1971	GCCW show	Mobile, AL	2	49		
87	Bob Kelly	January 19, 1972	GCCW show	Mobile, AL	6	49		
88	Donnie Fargo	March 8, 1972	GCCW show	Mobile, AL	3	35	Kelly was suspended	
89	Bob Kelly	April 12, 1972	GCCW show	Mobile, AL	7	56	Was awarded the championship when Fargo no-shows.	
90	Gorgeous George Jr.	June 7, 1972	GCCW show	Mobile, AL	1	35		
91	Bob Kelly	July 12, 1972	GCCW show	Mobile, AL	8	77		
92	The Wrestling Pro	September 27, 1972	GCCW show	Mobile, AL	4	13		
93	Bob Kelly	October 10, 1972	GCCW show	Mobile, AL	9	8		
94	The Wrestling Pro	October 18, 1972	GCCW show	Mobile, AL	5	35		
95	Bob Kelly	November 22, 1972	GCCW show	Mobile, AL	10	151		
96	The Mighty Mongol	April 22, 1973	GCCW show	Pensacola, FL	1	58		
97	The Lumberjack	June 19, 1973	GCCW show	Mobile, AL	1	39		
98	Ronnie Bass	July 28, 1973	GCCW show	Pensacola, FL	1	17		
99	Bob Griffin	August 14, 1973	GCCW show	Mobile, AL	1	11	Defeated Donnie Bass, subbing for injured Ronnie.	
100	Mike Boyette	August 25, 1973	GCCW show	Pensacola, FL	2	17		
101	Sweet Daddy Watts	September 11, 1973	GCCW show	Mobile, AL	1	21		
102	Mike Boyette	October 2, 1973	GCCW show	Mobile, AL	3	35		
103	The Mysterious Medic	November 6, 1973	GCCW show	Mobile, AL	2	14		
104	Mike Boyette	November 20, 1973	GCCW show	Mobile, AL	4	21		
105	Duke Miller	December 11, 1973	GCCW show	Mobile, AL	1	56		
106	The Mysterious Medic	February 5, 1974	GCCW show	Mobile, AL	3	7		
107	Duke Miller	February 12, 1974	GCCW show	Mobile, AL	2	147		
108	Ken Lucas	July 9, 1974	GCCW show	Mobile, AL	5	84		
109	Duke Miller	October 1, 1974	GCCW show	Mobile, AL	3	7		
110	Ken Lucas	October 8, 1974	GCCW show	Mobile, AL	6	42		
111	Jack Donovan	November 19, 1974	GCCW show	Mobile, AL	1	25		
112	Terry Latham	December 14, 1974	GCCW show	Pensacola, FL	1	59		
113	Duke Myers	February 11, 1975	GCCW show	Mobile, AL	1	21		
114	Ken Lucas	March 4, 1975	GCCW show	Mobile, AL	7	70		
115	Dr. X	May 13, 1975	GCCW show	Mobile, AL	1	83		
—	Vacated	August 4, 1975	—	—	—	—	Dr. X left the company.	
116	Nick Kozak	September 23, 1975	GCCW show	N/A	1	7	Was awarded the championship	
117	Duke Miller	September 30, 1975	GCCW show	Mobile, AL	4	54		
118	Rip Tyler	November 23, 1975	GCCW show	Pensacola, FL	2	35		
119	Bob Sweetan	December 28, 1975	GCCW show	Pensacola, FL	1	37		
120	Eddie Sullivan	February 3, 1976	GCCW show	Mobile, AL	1	28		
121	Duke Miller	March 2, 1976	GCCW show	Mobile, AL	5	1		
122	Rick Gibson	March 3, 1976	GCCW show	Mobile, AL	1	34		
—	Vacated	April 6, 1976	—	—	—	—	Title vacated due to injury.	
123	Eddie Sullivan	April 27, 1976	GCCW show	Mobile, AL	2	21	Was awarded the championship	
124	Ken Lucas	May 18, 1976	GCCW show	Mobile, AL	8	56		
125	Eddie Sullivan	July 13, 1976	GCCW show	Mobile, AL	3	63		
126	Sweet Daddy Banks	September 14, 1976	GCCW show	Mobile, AL	1	56		
127	Don Carson	November 9, 1976	GCCW show	Mobile, AL	5	14		
128	Ken Lucas	November 23, 1976	GCCW show	Mobile, AL	9	10		
129	The Wrestling Pro	December 3, 1976	GCCW show	Ozark, AL	6	109		
130	Ken Mantell	March 22, 1977	GCCW show	Mobile, AL	1	31		
131	The Wrestling Pro	April 22, 1977	GCCW show	Dothan, AL	7	18		
132	Kurt Von Hess	May 10, 1977	GCCW show	Mobile, AL	1	14		
133	The Wrestling Pro	May 24, 1977	GCCW show	Mobile, AL	8	30		
134	Kurt Von Hess	June 23, 1977	GCCW show	Panama City, FL	2	33		
135	Ken Lucas	July 26, 1977	GCCW show	Mobile, AL	10	52		
136	Billy Spears	September 16, 1977	GCCW show	Dothan, AL	1	7		
137	The Wrestling Pro	September 23, 1977	GCCW show	Dothan, AL	9	7		
138	The Superstar	September 30, 1977	GCCW show	Dothan, AL	1	32		
139	Ken Lucas	November 1, 1977	GCCW show	Mobile, AL	11	N/A		
—	Deactivated	January 1978	—	—	—	—	Promotion is sold to SECW. The Southern division of Southeastern Heavyweight Championship is often billed as the Gulf Coast Heavyweight Championship from then on seen as a direct continuation of the lineage.	
NWA Southeastern Heavyweight Championship (Southern Division)
140.5	Bob Armstrong	March 19, 1978	SECW show	Dothan, Alabama	1	N/A	Defeated David Schultz to become the first champion	
141.5	Unknown	N/A	SECW show	N/A		N/A		
142.5	Masked Superstar	1978	SECW show	N/A	1	N/A		
143.5	Unknown	N/A	SECW show	N/A		N/A		
144	Ron Fuller	April 5, 1978	SECW show	Mobile, Alabama	1	N/A	Won tournament	
145	Ken Lucas	April 1978	SECW show	N/A	1	N/A	Defeated David Shultz to win title	
146	Bob Armstrong	June 14, 1978	SECW show	Mobile, Alabama	2	35		
147	Ron Fuller	July 19, 1978	SECW show	Mobile, Alabama	2	56		
148	Bob Armstrong	September 13, 1978	SECW show	Mobile, Alabama	3	N/A		
149	Mongolian Stomper	October 1978	SECW show	N/A	1	N/A		
150	Unknown	November 19, 1978	SECW show	N/A		N/A	A championship match is held between The Stomper and The Wrestling Pro however the results are unrecorded	
151	Ron Fuller	April 1979	SECW show	N/A	3	N/A		
152	David Schultz	April 17, 1979	SECW show	Mobile, Alabama	1	17		
153	Ron Slinker	May 4, 1979	SECW show	Dothan, Alabama	1	2		
154	David Schultz	May 6, 1979	SECW show	Mobile, Alabama	2	17	Title change in dispute as Shutlz is recorded defending his title in Mobile, Alabama two days later	
155	Ox Baker	May 23, 1979	SECW show	Mobile, Alabama	1	14		
156	Terry "The Hulk" Boulder	June 6, 1979	SECW show	Mobile, Alabama	1	7		
157	Austin Idol	June 13, 1979	SECW show	Mobile, Alabama	1	N/A		
158	Unknown	N/A	SECW show	N/A		N/A		
159	Terry "The Hulk" Boulder	October 28, 1979 (NLT)	SECW show	N/A	2	N/A		
160	Toru Tanaka	November 1979	SECW show	N/A	1	N/A		
161	Bob Armstrong	November 23, 1979	SECW show	Mobile, Alabama	4	14		
162	Jos Leduc	December 7, 1979	SECW show	Mobile, Alabama	1	60		
163	Ron Fuller	February 5, 1980	SECW show	N/A	4	25		
164	Jimmy Golden	March 1, 1980	SECW show	Dothan, Alabama	1	3		
165	Ron Fuller	March 4, 1980	SECW show	Mobile, Alabama	5	N/A		
166	Jos Leduc	March 16, 1980 (NLT	SECW show	N/A	2	N/A		
167	Mongolian Stomper	April 1, 1980	SECW show	Mobile, Alabama	2	21		
168	Georgia Jawjacker	April 22, 1980	SECW show	Mobile, Alabama	5	N/A		
169.5	Mongolian Stomper	May 4, 1980 (NLT	SECW show	N/A	3	N/A		
170.5		N/A	SECW show	N/A		N/A		

== See also ==
- National Wrestling Alliance
- Gulf Coast Championship Wrestling
