= NWA Mississippi Heavyweight Championship =

Professional wrestling championship

Details
- Promotion: Gulf Coast Championship Wrestling
- Date established: July 3, 1958
- Date retired: September 3, 1976
Statistics
- First champion: Bobby Fields
- Final champion: Bob Kelly
- Most reigns: Bob Kelly (18)
- Longest reign: Lee Fields (281 days)
- Shortest reign: The Wrestling Pro/The Spoiler (4 days)

The NWA Mississippi Heavyweight Championship was a professional wrestling regional championship in Gulf Coast Championship Wrestling (GCCW). It was a secondary title, complementing the NWA Gulf Coast Heavyweight Championship, and one of several state championships recognized by the National Wrestling Alliance. The title was deactivated with the retirement of "Cowboy" Bob Kelly on September 3, 1976.

There have been a total of 33 recognized champions who have had a combined 78 official reigns, with Bob Kelly holding the most at eighteen. The longest reigning champion was Lee Fields, who held the title for 281 days. The shortest reigning champion was The Avenger, who held the title for only four days.

== Key ==
Reign	The reign number for the specific set of wrestlers listed
Event	The event promoted by the respective promotion in which the titles were won
N/A	The specific information is not known
—	Used for vacated reigns so as not to count it as an official reign
(n)	Indicates that a title change took place "no later than" the date listed. (Note: Documentation of the specific date of a title change is not found but documentation of the champion holding the title on that date/in that period.)
	Indicates that there was a period where the lineage is undocumented due to the lack of written documentation

== Title history ==
No.	Champion	Reign	Date	Days held	Location	Event	Notes	Ref.
1	Bobby Fields	1	July 3, 1958	63	Hattiesburg, MS	Live event	Defeated The Great Malenko in a tournament final.	
2	Mario Galento	1	September 4, 1958	5	Hattiesburg, MS	Live event		
3	Tom Drake	1	September 9, 1958	56	Laurel, MS	Live event		
4	Lee Fields	1	November 4, 1958	56	Laurel, MS	Live event		
5	Joe McCarthy	1	December 30, 1958	14	Laurel, MS	Live event		
6	Lee Fields	2	January 13, 1959	28	Laurel, MS	Live event	This was a boxing match.	
—	Vacated	—	February 10, 1959	—	Laurel, MS	Live event	Championship vacated when Lee Fields is stripped for fighting outside the ring during a title defense against Rocket Monroe and using a folding chair to attack his opponent.	
7	Pancho Villa	1	March 31, 1959	14	Laurel, MS	Live event	Defeated Lee Fields in a tournament final.	
8	Lee Fields	3	April 14, 1959	35	Laurel, MS	Live event		
9	John Smith	1	May 19, 1959	N/A	Laurel, MS	Live event		
—	Vacated	—	October 1959	—	Jackson, MS	Live event	Championship vacated following a controversial match between Lee Fields and The Mighty Yankee.	
10	Pancho Villa	2	November 1959	(Note: The exact date on which the title was won is not known, which means their title reign lasted between 15 and 44 days.)	Laurel, MS	Live event	Defeated Lee Fields in a tournament final.	
11	Lee Fields	4	December 15, 1959	70	Laurel, MS	Live event		
12	Joe McCarthy	2	February 23, 1960	(Note: The exact date on which the title was vacated is not known, which means their title reign lasted between 9 and 25 days.)	Laurel, MS	Live event		
—	Vacated	—	March 1960	—	N/A	N/A	Championship vacated when McCarthy is stripped of the title for refusing to accept a challenge by Al Galento.	
13	Al Galento	1	March 22, 1960	13	Laurel, MS	Live event	Defeated Jack Curtis, Jr. to win the vacant title.	
14	Lee Fields	5	April 4, 1960	281	Laurel, MS	Live event		
15	Pancho Villa	3	January 10, 1961	N/A	Laurel, MS	Live event		
16	Dick Dunn	1	March 2, 1964	N/A	Laurel, MS	Live event	Defeated Bobby Fields in a one-night 10-man tournament final.	
17	Bobby Fields	2	April 6, 1968	151	N/A	N/A	Billed as champion upon arrival.	
18	"Cowboy" Bob Kelly	1	September 4, 1968	47	Hattiesburg, MS	Live event		
19	Rocket Monroe	1	October 21, 1968	61	Laurel, MS	Live event		
20	Bob Kelly	2	December 21, 1968	117	Laurel, MS	Live event		
21	Mitsu Sito		April 17, 1969	27	Hattiesburg, MS	Live event		
22	Bob Boyer	1	May 14, 1969	85	Laurel, MS	Live event		
23	Rocket Monroe	2	August 7, 1969	21	Hattiesburg, MS	Live event		
24	The Blue Yankee	1	August 28, 1969	7	Hattiesburg, MS	Live event		
25	Bob Kelly	3	September 4, 1969	21	Hattiesburg, MS	Live event		
26	The Blue Yankee	2	September 25, 1969	123	Hattiesburg, MS	Live event		
27	Bob Kelly	4	January 26, 1970	80	Laurel, MS	Live event		
28	Mike Boyette	1	April 16, 1970	98	Hattiesburg, MS	Live event		
29	The Blue Yankee	3	July 23, 1970	28	Hattiesburg, MS	Live event		
30	Bobby Whitlock	1	August 20, 1970	28	Hattiesburg, MS	Live event		
31	The Avenger	1	September 17, 1970	4	Hattiesburg, MS	Live event		
32	Bob Kelly	5	September 21, 1970	35	Laurel, MS	Live event		
33	Rocket Monroe	3	October 26, 1970	31	Laurel, MS	Live event		
34	Ken Lucas	1	November 26, 1970	14	Hattiesburg, MS	Live event		
35	Rocket Monroe	4	December 10, 1970	42	Hattiesburg, MS	Live event		
36	Bobby Fields	3	January 21, 1971	(Note: The exact date on which the title was vacated is not known, which means their title reign lasted between 35 and 56 days.)	Hattiesburg, MS	Live event		
—	Vacated	—	1971	—	N/A	N/A	Championship vacated for unknown reasons; Fields may have been forced to forfeit the title due to a pre-match stipulation when he failed to defeat Sam Bass in less than 5 minutes Hattiesburg, Mississippi on February 25, 1971.	
37	Terry Garvin	1	March 18, 1971	7	Hattiesburg, MS	Live event	Defeated Bob Kelly in a tournament final.	
38	Bob Kelly	6	March 25, 1971	49	Hattiesburg, MS	Live event		
39	Eddie Sullivan	1	May 13, 1971	28	Hattiesburg, MS	Live event		
40	Bob Kelly	7	June 10, 1971	119	Hattiesburg, MS	Live event		
41	Eddie Sullivan	2	October 7, 1971	35	Hattiesburg, MS	Live event		
42	Ken Lucas	2	November 11, 1971	14	Hattiesburg, MS	Live event		
43	Eddie Sullivan	3	November 25, 1971	60	Hattiesburg, MS	Live event		
44	Bob Kelly	8	January 24, 1972	21	Laurel, MS	Live event		
45	Donnie Fargo	1	February 14, 1972	31	Laurel, MS	Live event		
46	Bob Kelly	9	March 16, 1972	120	Hattiesburg, MS	Live event		
47	The Spoiler	1	July 14, 1972	4	Hattiesburg, MS	Live event		
48	Arman Hussein	1	July 18, 1972	(Note: The exact date on which the title was vacated is not known, which means their title reign lasted between 14 and 44 days.)	Laurel, MS	Live event		
—	Vacated	—	August 1972	—	N/A	N/A	Championship vacated for failing to defend the title.	
49	Gorgeous George Jr.	1	August 31, 1972	14	Hattiesburg, MS	Live event	Won a battle royal to win the vacant title.	
50	The Spoiler	2	September 14, 1972	39	Hattiesburg, MS	Live event		
51	Arman Hussein	2	October 23, 1972	24	Laurel, MS	Live event		
52	The Mysterious Medic	1	November 16, 1972	28	Hattiesburg, MS	Live event		
53	Bob Kelly	10	December 14, 1972	35	Hattiesburg, MS	Live event		
54	The Mysterious Medic	2	January 18, 1973	21	Hattiesburg, MS	Live event		
55	Bob Kelly	11	February 8, 1973	63	Hattiesburg, MS	Live event		
56	The Wrestling Pro	1	April 12, 1973	4	Hattiesburg, MS	Live event		
57	Arman Hussein	3	April 16, 1973	59	Laurel, MS	Live event		
58	Rocket Monroe	5	June 14, 1973	70	Hattiesburg, MS	Live event		
59	Ken Lucas	3	August 23, 1973	39	Hattiesburg, MS	Live event		
60	Norvell Austin	1	October 1, 1973	24	Laurel, MS	Live event		
61	Ken Lucas	4	October 25, 1973	49	Hattiesburg, MS	Live event		
62	Duke Miller	1	December 13, 1973	35	Hattiesburg, MS	Live event		
63	Bob Kelly	12	January 17, 1974	98	Hattiesburg, MS	Live event		
64	The Wrestling Pro	2	April 25, 1974	(Note: The exact date on which the title was vacated is not known, which means their title reign lasted between 60 and 64 days.)	Hattiesburg, MS	Live event		
—	Vacated	—	June 1974	—	N/A	N/A	Championship vacated for unknown reasons. A 10-man tournament is held in Laurel, Mississippi on July 1, 1974, however, the winner is unknown.	
65	Jack Donovan	1	August, 1974 (n)	(Note: The exact date on which the title was won is not known, which means their title reign lasted between 31 and 195 days.)	Unknown	Live event		
66	Bob Kelly	13	February 20, 1975	14	Hattiesburg, MS	Live event		
67	Chris Colt	1	March 6, 1975	7	Hattiesburg, MS	Live event		
68	Bob Kelly	14	March 13, 1975	49	Hattiesburg, MS	Live event		
69	Rip Tyler	1	May 1, 1975	8	Hattiesburg, MS	Live event		
70	Big Bad John	1	May 9, 1975	13	Meridian, MS	Live event		
71	The Bounty Hunter #1	1	May 22, 1975	98	Hattiesburg, MS	Live event	This was during a battle royal in which Big Bad John had been put the title on the line.	
72	Bob Kelly	15	August 28, 1975	14	Hattiesburg, MS	Live event		
73	Melvin Kimball	1	September 11, 1975	14	Hattiesburg, MS	Live event		
74	Bob Kelly	16	September 25, 1975	84	Hattiesburg, MS	Live event		
—	Vacated	—	December 18, 1975	—	N/A	N/A	Championship vacated when Kelly leaves the Gulf Coast territory.	
75	Duke Miller	2	January 22, 1976	105	Hattiesburg, MS	Live event	Defeated Eddie Sullivan in a tournament final.	
76	Bob Kelly	17	May 6, 1976	49	Hattiesburg, MS	Live event		
—	Vacated	—	June 24, 1976	—	N/A	N/A	Title held up and a tournament is held to decide a new champion.	
77	Sweet Daddy Banks	1	July 1, 1976	14	Hattiesburg, MS	Live event	Won an 8-man tournament to win the vacant title.	
78	Bob Kelly	18	July 15, 1976	50	Hattiesburg, MS	Live event		
—	Deactivated	—	September 3, 1976	—	—	N/A	Championship is vacated upon Bob Kelly's retirement and subsequently abandoned.	

== List of top combined reigns ==
¤	The exact length of several title reigns are uncertain, so the shortest possible length is used.

List of combined reigns
Rank	Champion	No. of reigns	Combined days
1	Bob Kelly	18	1,065
2	Lee Fields	5	470
3	Bobby Fields	3	249
4	Rocket Monroe	5	225
5	The Blue Yankee	3	158
6	Duke Miller	2	140
7	Eddie Sullivan	3	123
8	Ken Lucas	4	116
9	Mike Boyette	1	98
10	Bounty Hunter #1	1	98
11	Arman Hussein	3	97
12	Bob Boyer	1	85
13	The Wrestling Pro	2	64¤
14	Tom Drake	1	56
15	Dick Dunn	1	54¤
16	The Mysterious Medic	2	49
17	The Spoiler	2	43
18	Donnie Fargo	1	31
19	Pancho Villa	3	28¤
20	Bobby Whitlock	1	28
21	Mitsu Sito	1	27
22	Norvell Austin	1	24
23	Joe McCarthy	2	23¤
24	Gorgeous George Jr.	1	14
25	Melvin Kimball	1	14
26	Big Bad John	1	13
27	Al Galento	1	13
28	Rip Tyler	1	8
29	Terry Garvin	1	7
30	Chris Colt	1	7
31	Mario Galento	1	5
32	The Avenger	1	4
33	John Smith	1	N/A
