= NWA United States Tag Team Championship (Gulf Coast version) =

Professional wrestling tag team championship

Details
- Promotion: Gulf Coast Championship Wrestling
- Date established: November 2, 1965
- Date retired: April 15, 1974
Statistics
- First champions: The Dirty Daltons (Jack Dalton and Jim Dalton/Frank Dalton)
- Final champions: Cowboy Bob Kelly and Rocket Monroe
- Most reigns: The Dirty Daltons (5)
- Longest reign: The Dirty Daltons (300 days)
- Shortest reign: Mike Boyette and The Wrestling Pro (Less than 1 day)

The Gulf Coast version of the NWA United States Tag Team Championship was a professional wrestling tag team championship in Gulf Coast Championship Wrestling (GCCW). A secondary title after the NWA Gulf Coast Tag Team Championship, it was one of many U.S. tag team championships recognized by the National Wrestling Alliance. It was unified with the NWA United States Tag Team Championship (Tri-State version) on April 15, 1974.

Some reigns were held by champions using a ring name, while others used their real name. There have been a total of 37 recognized individual champions and 25 recognized teams, who have had a combined 39 official reigns. The first champions were The Dirty Daltons (Jack Dalton and Jim Dalton), and the final champions were "Cowboy" Bob Kelly and Rocket Monroe. At 300 days, The Dirty Daltons' first reign was the longest, while the team of Mike Boyette and The Wrestling Pro's second reign was the shortest, at less than one day.

The team with the most reigns is The Dalton Brothers (Jack Dalton and Frank Dalton) with five. Mike Boyette has the most individual reigns with seven. The following is a chronological list of teams that have been United States Tag Team Champions by ring name.

== Key ==
Reigns	The number of times a specific set of wrestlers have won the titles
Event	The event promoted by the respective promotion in which the titles were won
N/A	The information is not available.
Wrestler name (#)	The number represents the number of times the wrestler has held the title individually
—	Used for vacated reigns in order to not count it as an official reign

== Title history ==
No.	Champions	Reign	Date	Days held	Location	Event	Notes	Ref(s)
1	The Dirty Daltons (Jack and Jim/Frank)	1	November 2, 1965	300	N/A	House show	Billed as champions upon arrival in the territory. Jim Dalton left GCCW in January 1966. Jack Dalton chose Frank Dalton as his replacement partner.	
2	Lee Fields and Bobby Fields	1	August 29, 1966	41	Alexandria, Louisiana	House show		
3	The Dirty Daltons (Jack and Frank)	2	October 9, 1966	122	Lafayette, Louisiana	House show	This was during an 11-team tournament in which the Fields had put the title on the line.	
4	Roger Kirby and Dennis Hall	1	February 8, 1967	7	Mobile, Alabama	House show		
5	The Dirty Daltons (Jack and Frank)	3	February 15, 1967	6	Mobile, Alabama	House show		
6	Bobby Fields (2) and Danny Little Bear	1	February 21, 1967	49	Baton Rouge, Louisiana	House show		
7	The Dirty Daltons (Jack and Frank)	4	April 11, 1967	99	Baton Rouge, Louisiana	House show		
8	Ramon Perez and Pepe Perez	1	July 19, 1967	76	New Orleans, Louisiana	House show		
9	The Dirty Daltons (Jack and Frank)	5	October 3, 1967	(Note: The exact date on which the title was vacated is not known, which means their title reign lasted between 242 and 271 days.)	Baton Rouge, Louisiana	House show		
—	Vacated	—	June 1968	—		House show	The championship was vacated when the Dalton Brothers left the territory.	
10	The Rising Suns (The Great Ota and Mr. Koma)	1	April 14, 1971	35	N/A	House show	Billed as champions upon arrival in the territory.	
11	Mike Boyette and The Wrestling Pro/Ken Lucas	1	May 19, 1971	7	Mobile, Alabama	House show	The Wrestling Pro is suspended immediately after the match. Boyette chose Ken Lucas as his replacement partner.	
12	The Rising Suns (The Great Ota and Mr. Koma)	2	May 26, 1971	7	Mobile, Alabama	House show		
13	Ken Lucas (2) and Johnny West	1	June 2, 1971	28	Mobile, Alabama	House show	Lucas and West were also the NWA Gulf Coast Tag Team Champions.	
14	Rip Tyler and Eddie Sullivan	1	June 30, 1971	14	Mobile, Alabama	House show		
15	Mike Boyette and The Wrestling Pro	2	July 14, 1971	0	Mobile, Alabama	House show	Were awarded the title, when Sullivan was unable to defend the title due to a broken leg.	
—	Vacated	—	July 14, 1971	—	Mobile, Alabama	House show	The championship is vacated when The Wrestling Pro turns on Mike Boyette after their first title defense against Rip Tyler and Jimmy Hyde. Both wrestlers were allowed to pick new partner after the split.	
16	Mike Boyette (3) and Calvin Pullins	1	August 11, 1971	35	Mobile, Alabama	House show	Defeated The Wrestling Pro and Rip Tyler to win the vacant title.	
17	The Alaskans (Mike York and Frank Monte)	1	September 15, 1971	46	Mobile, Alabama	House show		
18	Mike Boyette (4) and Calvin Pullins (2)	2	October 31, 1971	45	Pensacola, Florida	House show	In December 1971, Boyette and Pullins broke up and were allowed to pick new partners after the split.	
19	Mike Boyette (5) and Cowboy Bob Kelly	1	December 15, 1971	46	Mobile, Alabama	House show	Defeated Calvin Pullins and Bobby Shane	
20	Rip Tyler and Eddie Sullivan	2	January 30, 1972	38	Pensacola, Florida	House show		
21	The California Hippies (Mike Boyette (6) and Mickey Doyle)	1	March 8, 1972	151	Mobile, Alabama	House show		
22	Rip Tyler and Eddie Sullivan	3	August 6, 1972	108	Pensacola, Florida	House show		
23	Flash Monroe and Rocket Monroe	1	November 22, 1972	13	Mobile, Alabama	House show		
24	The Wrestling Pro (3) and The Mysterious Medic	1	December 5, 1972	70	Mobile, Alabama	House show		
25	Cowboy Bob Kelly (2) and Ken Lucas (3)	1	February 13, 1973	42	Mobile, Alabama	House show		
26	The Mighty Mongol and The Rugged Russian	1	March 27, 1973	14	Mobile, Alabama	House show		
27	Ken Lucas (4) and Dennis Hall (2)	1	April 10, 1973	14	Mobile, Alabama	House show		
28	The Mongol and The Rugged Russian	2	April 24, 1973	21	Mobile, Alabama	House show		
29	The California Hippies (Mike Boyette (7) and Mickey Doyle)	2	May 15, 1973	7	Mobile, Alabama	House show		
30	Rip Tyler and Eddie Sullivan	4	May 22, 1973	96	Mobile, Alabama	House show		
31	Don Bass and Bobby Bass	1	August 26, 1973	37	Pensacola, Florida	House show		
32	Flash Monroe and Rocket Monroe	2	October 2, 1973	35	Mobile, Alabama	House show		
33	The Infernos (Inferno #1 and Inferno #2)	1	November 6, 1973	31	Mobile, Alabama	House show		
34	Ricky Gibson and Steve Keirn	1	December 7, 1973	7	Dothan, Alabama	House show		
35	The Infernos (Inferno #1 and Inferno #2)	2	December 14, 1973	27	Dothan, Alabama	House show		
36	Kubla Khan and Gunga Din	1	January 10, 1974	5	Atlanta, Georgia	House show		
37	Rocket Monroe (3) and Norvell Austin	1	January 15, 1974	7	Mobile, Alabama	House show		
38	Kubla Khan and Gunga Din	2	January 22, 1974	30	Mobile, Alabama	House show		
39	Cowboy Bob Kelly (3) and Rocket Monroe (4)	1	February 21, 1974	53	Hattiesburg, Mississippi	House show		
-	Unified	-	April 15, 1974	-	Shreveport, Louisiana	House show	Unified with the NWA United States Tag Team Championship (Tri-State version) when Bob Sweetan and Seigfried Stanke defeated Kelly and Monroe.	

== List of top combined reigns ==
¤	The exact length of one title reign is uncertain, so the shortest possible length is used.

=== By team ===
Rank	Team	No. of reigns	Combined days
1	The Dirty Daltons	5	769¤
2	Rip Tyler and Eddie Sullivan	4	256
3	The California Hippies	2	158
4	Mike Boyette and Calvin Pullins	2	81
5	Ramon Perez and Pepe Perez	1	76
6	The Wrestling Pro and The Mysterious Medic	1	70
7	The Infernos	2	58
8	Cowboy Bob Kelly and Rocket Monroe	1	53
9	Bobby Fields and Danny Little Bear	1	49
10	Flash Monroe and Rocket Monroe	2	48
11	Mike Boyette and Cowboy Bob Kelly	1	46
12	The Alaskans	1	46
13	The Rising Suns	2	42
14	Cowboy Bob Kelly and Ken Lucas	1	42
15	Lee Fields and Bobby Fields	1	41
16	Don Bass and Bobby Bass	1	37
17	The Mighty Mongol and The Rugged Russian	2	35
18	Kubla Khan and Gunga Din	2	35
19	Ken Lucas and Johnny West	1	28
20	Ken Lucas and Dennis Hall	1	14
21	Rocket Monroe and Norvell Austin	1	7
22	Roger Kirby and Dennis Hall	1	7
23	Ricky Gibson and Steve Keirn	1	7
24	Mike Boyette and Ken Lucas	1	7
25	Mike Boyette and The Wrestling Pro	2	<1

=== By wrestler ===
Rank	Wrestler	No. of reigns	Combined Days
1	Jack Dalton	5	769
2	Frank Dalton	5	709
3	Mike Boyette	7	292
4	Rip Tyler	4	256
4	Eddie Sullivan	4	256
5	Mickey Doyle	2	158
6	Cowboy Bob Kelly	3	141
7	Rocket Monroe	4	108
8	Ken Lucas	4	91
9	Bobby Fields	2	90
10	Calvin Pullins	2	81
11	Ramon Perez	1	76
11	Pepe Perez	1	76
13	The Wrestling Pro	3	70
13	The Mysterious Medic	1	70
15	Jim Dalton	1	60
16	Inferno #1	2	58
16	Inferno #2	2	58
17	Danny Little Bear	1	49
18	Flash Monroe	2	48
19	Mike York	1	46
19	Frank Monte	1	46
21	The Great Ota	2	42
21	Mr. Koma	2	42
23	Lee Fields	1	41
24	Don Bass	1	37
24	Bobby Bass	1	37
26	The Mighty Mongol	2	35
26	The Rugged Russian	2	35
28	Kubla Khan	2	35
28	Gunga Din	2	35
30	Johnny West	1	28
31	Dennis Hall	2	21
32	Norvell Austin	1	7
32	Roger Kirby	1	7
32	Ricky Gibson	1	7
32	Steve Keirn	1	7

== See also ==
- List of National Wrestling Alliance championships
