= NWA Gulf Coast Tag Team Championship =

Professional wrestling tag team championship

Details
- Promotion: Gulf Coast Championship Wrestling
- Date established: January 4, 1955 (GC Version); March 8, 1967 (NWA Gulf); April 1978 (Southern division)
- Date retired: January 1967 (Southern); January 1978 (NWA Gulf); September 1980 (Southern division)

Other names
- NWA Southern Tag Team Championship (Gulf Coast Version); NWA Southern Tag Team Championship (Southern Division)
Statistics
- First champions: Lee Fields and Herb Welch (Southern); Roger Kirby and Dennis Hall (NWA Gulf); The Assassins (Southern division)
- Final champions: Don Carson and Maxie York; Rip Tyler and Eddie Sullivan (NWA Gulf); Billey Spears and The Assassin (Southern division)
- Most reigns: The Mysterios Medics (10 reigns)

The NWA Gulf Coast Tag Team Championship was the main tag team championship in Gulf Coast Championship Wrestling or NWA Gulf Coast. The Gulf Coast tag team championship is the successor for GCCW's version of the NWA Southern Tag Team Championship that was promoted in the Tennessee, Alabama, Florida and Mississippi region from 1955 until 1967 where it was replaced by the "NWA Gulf Coast Tag Team Championship. The Gulf Coast Tag Team championship was promoted from 1967 until 1978 where Southeast Championship Wrestling took control of the title renaming in back to the "NWA Southern Tag Team Championship" and promoted it in its "Southern Division" in 1978 and 1979. In 1980 the Southern Division was abandoned and the Northern Division of the NWA Southern Tag Team Championship became the main title of SECW.

== Title history ==
[...] Means champion lineage is uncertain at this period in time
NLT means "No later than"

=== NWA Southern Tag Team Championship (Gulf Coast version) ===
Key
No.	Overall reign number
Reign	Reign number for the specific champion
Days	Number of days held

No.	Champion	Championship change			Reign statistics		Notes	Ref.
No.	Champion	Date	Event	Location	Reign	Days	Notes	Ref.
1	Lee Fields and Herb Welch	January 4, 1955	SCW show	Mobile, AL	1	35	Defeat Red Roberts and Mario Galento in tournament final	
2	Red Roberts and Mario Galento	February 8, 1955	SCW show	Mobile, AL	1	105	Awarded when Lee Fields is injured and unable to compete in title match	
3	Jack Curtis and George Curtis	May 24, 1955	SCW show	Mobile, AL	1	42		
4	Red Roberts and Mario Galento	July 5, 1955	SCW show	Mobile, AL	2	134		
5	Don Fields and Lee Fields	November 16, 1955	SCW show	Mobile, AL	1	N/A	Awarded when Roberts is injured and unable to compete in title match; title inactive after 56	
—	Deactivated	1956	—	—	—	—	Tennessee/Mid-America version is defended between 56 and 59.	
6	John Smith and Tosh Togo	October 28, 1959	SCW show	Mobile, AL	1	14	Defeat Don Fields and Bobby Fields in tournament final	
7	Don Fields and Bobby Fields	November 11, 1959	SCW show	Mobile, AL	1	56		
8	Corsica Joe and Corsica Jean	January 6, 1960	SCW show	Mobile, AL	1	21	Also recognized as champions in Mid-America territory	
9	Don Fields and Bobby Fields	January 27, 1960	SCW show	Mobile, AL	2	84	Also win Mid-America version	
10	Great Bolo and Joe McCarthy	April 20, 1960	SCW show	Mobile, AL	1	7		
11	Don Fields and Bobby Fields	April 27, 1960	SCW show	Mobile, AL	3	N/A		
—	Deactivated	N/A	—	—	—	—		
12	The Mysterious Medics	February 22, 1961	SCW show	N/A	1	42	Billed as champions on arrival	
13	Don Fields and Bobby Fields	April 5, 1961	SCW show	Mobile, AL	4	7		
14	The Mysterious Medics	April 12, 1961	SCW show	Mobile, AL	2	14		
15	Jackie Fargo and Joey Fargo	April 26, 1961	SCW show	Mobile, AL	1	7		
16	the Mysterious Medics	May 3, 1961	SCW show	Mobile, AL	3	42		
17	Jerry Kozak and Nick Kozak	June 14, 1961	SCW show	Mobile, AL	1	55		
18	Billy Hines and Bad Boy Hines	August 8, 1961	SCW show	Pensacola, FL	1	59		
19	Don Fields and Bobby Fields	October 6, 1961	SCW show	Dothan, AL	5	147		
20	Billy Hines and Bad Boy Hines	March 2, 1962	SCW show	Dothan, AL	2	26		
21	the Mysterious Medics	March 28, 1962	SCW show	Mobile, AL	4	21		
22	Tex Riley and Gus Taylor	April 18, 1962	SCW show	Mobile, AL	1	7		
23	the Mysterious Medics	April 25, 1962	SCW show	Mobile, AL	5	37		
24	Jackie Fargo and Jack Donovan	June 1, 1962	SCW show	Dothan, AL	1	19		
—	Vacated	June 20, 1962	—	—	—	—	Donovan and Fargo split	
25	Lee Fields and Greg Peterson	September 26, 1962	SCW show	N/A	1	30	Awarded	
26	Billy Hines and Bad Boy Hines	October 26, 1962	SCW show	Dothan, AL	3	5		
27	the Mysterious Medics	October 31, 1962	SCW show	Mobile, AL	6	−358		
28	Billy Hines and Bad Boy Hines	November 7, 1961	SCW show	Mobile, AL	4	430		
29	Jan Madrid and Jack Curtis Jr.	January 11, 1963	SCW show	Dothan, AL	1	5		
30	Al Greene and Don Greene	January 16, 1963	SCW show	Mobile, AL	1	84		
31	Lee Fields and Joe Scarpa	April 10, 1963	SCW show	Mobile, AL	1	21		
32	Tiger Tomasso and Pancho Villa	May 1, 1963	SCW show	Mobile, AL	1	2		
33	Lee Fields and Joe Scarpa	May 3, 1963	SCW show	Dothan, AL	2	215	Vacant on June 5, 1963 when Scarpa leaves the territory	
34	the Mysterious Medics	December 4, 1963	SCW show	N/A	7	105	Awarded	
35	Lee Fields and Mario Galento	March 18, 1964	SCW show	Mobile, AL	1	14		
36	the Mysterious Medics	April 1, 1964	SCW show	Mobile, AL	8	54		
—	Vacated	May 25, 1964	—	—	—	—	The Medics leave the territory	
37	Lee Fields and Bobby Fields	October 19, 1964	SCW show	N/A	1	2	Awarded	
38	Corsica Joe and Corsica Jean	October 21, 1964	SCW show	Mobile, AL	2	7		
—	Vacated	October 28, 1964	—	—	—	—	the Corsicans leave the territory	
39	Terry Garvin and Chin Lee	November 9, 1964	SCW show	N/A	1	11	Awarded	
40	Adrian and Tony Baillargeon	November 20, 1964	SCW show	Lafayette, LA	1	7		
41	Terry Garvin and Chin Lee	November 27, 1964	SCW show	Lafayette, LA	2	68		
42	Lee Fields and Bobby Fields	February 3, 1965	SCW show	Mobile, AL	2	57		
—	Vacated	April 1, 1965	—	—	—	—	Lee Fields retires.	
43	Ken Lucas and Chris Lucas	August 4, 1965	SCW show	Mobile, AL	1	84	Defeat Bad Boy Hines and Billy Boy Hines in a tournament final	
44	the Mysterious Medics	October 27, 1965	SCW show	Mobile, AL	9	21		
45	Ken Lucas and Chris Lucas	November 17, 1965	SCW show	Mobile, AL	2	7		
46	the Mysterious Medics	November 24, 1965	SCW show	Mobile, AL	10	23		
47	Ken Lucas and Chris Lucas	December 17, 1965	SCW show	Dothan, AL	3	56		
48	Don Carson and Mazie York	February 11, 1966	SCW show	Dothan, AL	1	12		
—	Vacated	February 23, 1966	—	—	—	—	Don Carson suffers a broken leg.	
49	Ken Lucas and Chris Lucas	March 26, 1966	SCW show	N/A	4	39	Awarded	
50	Eduardo Perez and Rocky Montero	May 4, 1966	SCW show	Dothan, AL	1	23		
51	Bad Boy Hines and Billy Boy Hines	May 27, 1966	SCW show	Dothan, AL	5	7		
52	Ramon Torres and Silento Rodriguez	June 3, 1966	SCW show	Dothan, AL	1	47	Rodriguez is injured and gives up his share of the title	
53	Ramon Torres and Bobby Fields	July 20, 1966	SCW show	N/A	1	12	Fields replaces Rodriguez as Torres' partner	
—	Vacated	August 1, 1966	—	—	—	—	Fields moves to the Louisiana end of the territory	
54	Ken Lucas and Chris Lucas	August 1, 1966	SCW show	N/A	5	57	Awarded	
55	Don Carson and Maxie York	September 27, 1966	SCW show	Baton Rouge, LA	1	N/A		
—	Deactivated	January 1967	—	—	—	—	Replaced with Gulf Coast Tag Team Championship	

=== NWA Gulf Coast Tag Team Championship ===
Key
No.	Overall reign number
Reign	Reign number for the specific champion
Days	Number of days held

No.	Champion	Championship change			Reign statistics		Notes	Ref.
No.	Champion	Date	Event	Location	Reign	Days	Notes	Ref.
1	Roger Kirby and Dennis Hall	March 8, 1967	SCW show	N/A	1	13	Recognized as first champions	
2	Don Carson and Ron Carson	March 21, 1967	SCW show	Pensacola, FL	1	9		
3	Roger Kirby and Dennis Hall	March 30, 1967	SCW show	Dothan, AL	2	8		
4	Don Carson and Ron Carson	April 7, 1967	SCW show	Dothan, AL	2	35		
5	Roger Kirby and Dennis Hall	May 12, 1967	SCW show	Dothan, AL	3	7		
6	Don Carson and Ron Carson	May 19, 1967	SCW show	Dothan, AL	3	47		
7	Ken Lucas and Bobby Fields	July 5, 1967	SCW show	Mobile, AL	1	12		
8	Rip Tyler and Tim Tyler	July 17, 1967	SCW show	Panama City, FL	1	28	Stripped when Tim Tyler suffers a broken leg.	
9	Ken Lucas and Bobby Fields	August 14, 1967	SCW show	N/A	2	67	Awarded	
10	Rip Tyler and Randy Tyler	October 20, 1967	SCW show	Dothan, AL	1	22	Held up after a match against Eddie Sullivan and Ramon Perez on November 2 in Mobile, AL	
—	Vacated	November 11, 1967	SCW show	—	—	—	Tyler no-shows for the scheduled rematch	
11	Jack Dalton and Frank Dalton	January 5, 1968	SCW show	Dothan, AL	1	7	Defeat Dick Dunn and Don Carson	
12	Lee Fields and Bobby Fields	January 12, 1968	SCW show	Dothan, AL	1	35		
13	Chin Lee and Pancho Villa	February 16, 1968	SCW show	Dothan, AL	1	14		
14	Ken Lucas and Dennis Hall	March 1, 1968	SCW show	Dothan, AL	1	14		
15	Scorpion and Cobra Kid	March 15, 1968	SCW show	Dothan, AL	1	12		
16	Lee Fields and Bobby Fields	March 27, 1968	SCW show	Mobile, AL	2	59		
17	The Interns; Bill Bowman and Joe Turner	May 25, 1968	SCW show	Dothan, AL	1	18		
18	Ramon Perez and Pepe Perez	June 12, 1968	SCW show	Mobile, AL	1	9		
19	The Interns; Bill Bowman and Joe Turner	June 21, 1968	SCW show	Dothan, AL	2	40		
20	Lee Fields and Mario Galento	July 31, 1968	SCW show	Mobile, AL	1	14		
21	The Interns; Bill Bowman and Joe Turner	August 14, 1968	SCW show	Mobile, AL	3	21		
22	Bobby Fields and Bob Kelly	September 4, 1968	SCW show	Mobile, AL	1	/A	Held up after a match against the Interns in October, Hattiesburg, MS	
23	Bobby Fields and Bob Kelly	October 1968	SCW show	N/A	2	N/A	Defeat the Interns in rematch.	
24	The Interns; Bill Bowman and Joe Turner	October 16, 1968	SCW show	Mobile, AL	4	23		
25	Don Carson and Dick Dunn	November 8, 1968	SCW show	Dothan, AL	1	14		
26	Rocket and Flash Monroe	November 22, 1968	SCW show	Dothan, AL	1	54		
27	Don Carson and Dick Dunn	January 15, 1969	SCW show	Mobile, AL	2	9		
28	Rocket and Flash Monroe	January 24, 1969	SCW show	Dothan, AL	2	28		
29	Mitsu Sito and Sugi Sito	February 21, 1969	SCW show	Dothan, AL	1	5		
30	Bob Kelly and Ramon Perez	February 26, 1969	SCW show	Mobile, AL	1	14		
31	Rocket and Flash Monroe	March 12, 1969	SCW show	Mobile, AL	3	77		
32	Ken Lucas and Chris Lucas	May 28, 1969	SCW show	Mobile, AL	1	21	Stripped when Chris Lucas leaves the area	
33	Rocket and Flash Monroe	June 18, 1969	SCW show	N/A	4	16	Awarded.	
34	Ken Lucas and Don Carson	July 4, 1969	SCW show	Dothan, AL	1	28		
35	Ken Lucas and Mac MacFarland	August 1, 1969	SCW show	N/A	1	19	Lucas is allowed to pick new partner when Carson leaves the area	
36	Frank Dalton and Black Hand	August 20, 1969	SCW show	Mobile, AL	1	28		
37	Ken Lucas and Don Carson	September 17, 1969	SCW show	Mobile, AL	2	16		
38	Rocket and Flash Monroe	October 3, 1969	SCW show	Dothan, AL	5	19		
39	Ken Lucas and Bobby Fields	October 22, 1969	SCW show	Mobile, AL	3	7		
40	Rocket and Flash Monroe	October 29, 1969	SCW show	Mobile, AL	6	79		
41	Dick Dunn and Ken Lucas	January 16, 1970	SCW show	Dothan, AL	1	48		
42	Rip Tyler and Randy Tyler	March 5, 1970	SCW show	Panama City, FL	2	77		
43	Don Carson and Rocket Monroe	May 21, 1970	SCW show	Panama City, FL	1	4		
44	Eddie Sullivan and The Wrestling Pro	May 25, 1970	SCW show	Panama City, FL	1	N/A		
—	Deactivated	N/A	SCW show	N/A	—	—		
45	Eddie Sullivan and Dandy Jack Morrell	January 1, 1971	SCW show	N/A	1	69	Awarded.	
46	Ken Lucas and Johnny West	March 11, 1971	SCW show	Hattiesburg, MS	1	N/A	Recognition withdrawn when Lucas and West win the U.S. Tag Team Title on June 2, 1971	
47	Mike Boyette and Frank Dalton	February 3, 1972 (NLT)	SCW show	N/A	1	N/A	Defend title against Eddie Sullivan and Rip Tyler in Panama City, FL. No record of who they won the title from	
48	Ken Lucas and Mike Boyette	May 21, 1974	SCW show	Mobile, AL	1	5	Defeat Duke Miller and The Wrestling Pro in one-night tournament final when the title is reinstated	
49	Ron and Don Bass	May 26, 1974	SCW show	Pensacola, FL	1	72		
50	The Wrestling Pro and Mighty Yankee	August 6, 1974	SCW show	Mobile, AL	1	7	The team splits and is allowed to choose new partners to meet in a match to determine new champions	
51	The Mighty Yankees (#1 and #2)	August 13, 1974	SCW show	Mobile, AL	1	28	Defeats the Wrestling Pro and Big Bad John; Yankees split up and Yankee 2 unmasks to reveal Duke Miller, who has been under suspension; Yankee 1 is allowed to keep the title and chooses Mighty Yankee #3 as new partner	
52	The Wrestling Pro and Duke Miller	September 10, 1974	SCW show	Mobile, AL	1	26	Miller's suspension has been lifted with the votes by the fans before the match	
53	The Patriots (Bobby Hart and Bob Griffin masked)	October 6, 1974	SCW show	Pensacola, FL	1	30		
54	Mike Boyette and Bearcat Brown	November 5, 1974	SCW show	Mobile, AL	1	42		
55	The Hell's Angels	December 17, 1974	SCW show	Mobile, AL	1	49		
56	Bobby Fields and Bob Kelly	February 4, 1975	SCW show	Mobile, AL	2	17		
57	The Hell's Angels	February 21, 1975	SCW show	Dothan, AL	2	14		
58	Terry Lathan and Ron Starr	March 7, 1975	SCW show	Dothan, AL	1	58		
59	The Mighty Yankees (#1 and #3)	May 4, 1975	SCW show	Pensacola, FL	2	9		
60	Rip Tyler and Big Bad John	May 13, 1975	SCW show	Mobile, AL	1	21		
61	The Mighty Yankees #1 and #3	June 3, 1975	SCW show	Mobile, AL	3	35		
62	Bounty Hunters	July 8, 1975	SCW show	Mobile, AL	1	24		
63	Ken Lucas and Nick Kozak	August 1, 1975	SCW show	Dothan, AL	1	18		
64	The Wrestling Pros	August 19, 1975	SCW show	Dothan, AL	1	103		
65	British Bulldogs; Edward Heath and Jonathan Foley	November 30, 1975	SCW show	Pensacola, FL	1	51		
66	Lanny and Randy Poffo	January 20, 1976	SCW show	Mobile, AL	1	28	Stripped when the Poffos are fired on February 17, 1977 after an altercation with matchmaker Rip Tyler.	
67	Rip Tyler and Eddie Sullivan	February 17, 1976	SCW show	N/A	1	31	Awarded	
68	Ron Bass and Dutch Bass	March 19, 1976	SCW show	Pensacola, FL	1	60		
69	Bob Kelly and Rip Tyler	May 18, 1976	SCW show	Mobile, AL	1	17		
70	The Challengers	June 4, 1976	SCW show	Dothan, AL	1	7		
71	Ken Lucas and Gorgeous George Jr.	June 11, 1976	SCW show	Dothan, AL	1	14		
72	The Challengers	June 25, 1976	SCW show	Dothan, AL	2	60		
73	Rip Tyler and Eddie Sullivan	August 24, 1976	SCW show	Mobile, AL	2	30		
74	Bobby Fields and Ricky Fields	September 23, 1976	SCW show	Panama City, FL	1	162		
75	The Islanders; Afa and Sika	March 4, 1977	SCW show	Dothan, AL	1	32		
76	Eddie Sullivan and Sonny King	April 5, 1977	SCW show	Mobile, AL	1	1		
77	The Islanders; Afa and Sika	April 6, 1977	SCW show	N/A	2	23	Title returned when Sonny King also holds the Alabama Heavyweight Title and is not allowed to hold both titles	
78	Rip Tyler and Eddie Sullivan	April 29, 1977	SCW show	Dothan, AL	3	18		
79	The Real Rip Tyler and Jim Dalton	May 17, 1977	SCW show	Mobile, AL	1	N/A		
—	Vacated	May 1977	SCW show	N/A	—	—		
80	The Real Rip Tyler and Eddie Sullivan	May 31, 1977	SCW show	N/A	4	1	Awarded	
81	The Wrestling Pro and Eddie Sullivan	June 1, 1977	SCW show	N/A	2	20	The Pro replaces Tyler	
82	Blue Yankee and Billy Spears	June 21, 1977	SCW show	Mobile, AL	1	28		
83	Blue Yankee and Eddie Sullivan	July 19, 1977	SCW show	Mobile, AL	1	42	Billy Spears gives his share of the title to Sullivan and becomes the manager for Yankee and Sullivan	
84	Ken Lucas and Ricky Fields	August 30, 1977	SCW show	Mobile, AL	1	56		
85	Pat Kelly and Mike Kelly	October 25, 1977	SCW show	Mobile, AL	1	38		
86	Ken Lucas and The Wrestling Pro	December 2, 1977	SCW show	Dothan, AL	1	7	Awarded when the Kellys no-show	
87	The Real Rip Tyler and Eddie Sullivan	December 9, 1977	SCW show	Dothan, AL	4	N/A	Awarded	
—	Deactivated	January 1978	SCW show	N/A	—	—	Promotion is sold to SECW; The southern division of Southeastern Tag Team Title is often billed as Gulf Coast Tag Team Title after that date.	

=== NWA Southern Tag Team Championship (Southern Division) ===
Key
No.	Overall reign number
Reign	Reign number for the specific champion
Days	Number of days held

No.	Champion	Championship change			Reign statistics		Notes	Ref.
No.	Champion	Date	Event	Location	Reign	Days	Notes	Ref.
1	The Assassins	April 1978	SCW show	N/A	1	N/A	First champions.	
2	Ricky and Reuben Gibson	June 21, 1978	SCW show	Mobile, Alabama	1	84		
3	The Assassins	September 13, 1978	SCW show	Mobile, Alabama	2	N/A		
4	Robert Fuller and Bob Armstrong	October 1978	SCW show	N/A	1	N/A	Order of title holders not 100% verified	
5	Don Carson and Assassin	October 1978	SCW show	N/A	1	N/A	Order of title holders not 100% verified	
Championship history is unrecorded from to .
6	and Terry Latham	May 1979	SCW show	N/A	1	N/A		
7	The Wild Samoans; Afa and Sika	May 11, 1979	SCW show	Dothan, Alabama	1	7		
8	and Terry Latham	May 18, 1979	SCW show	Dothan, Alabama	2	14		
9	The Wild Samoans; Afa and Sika	June 1, 1979	SCW show	Dothan, Alabama	2	21		
10	The Dargan Twins	June 22, 1979	SCW show	Dothan, Alabama	1	19		
11	The Assassins	July 11, 1979	SCW show	Mobile, Alabama	3	118		
12	Robert Fuller and Jerry Stubbs	November 6, 1979	SCW show	Pensacola, Florida	1	16		
13	The Mongolians	November 22, 1979	SCW show	Mobile, Alabama	1	75		
14	Robert Fuller and Ed Boulder	February 5, 1980	SCW show	Mobile, Alabama	1	N/A		
Championship history is unrecorded from to .
15	Robert Fuller and Ron Fuller	March 18, 1980	SCW show	Dothan, Alabama	1	56		
16	Norvell Austin and Randy Rose	May 13, 1980	SCW show	Mobile, Alabama	1	N/A		
Championship history is unrecorded from to .
17	Bob Armstrong and Charlie Cook	June 22, 1980	SCW show	N/A	1	2		
18	Ron Bass and Randy Rose	June 24, 1980	SCW show	Mobile, Alabama	1	−42		
19	Norvell Austin and Randy Rose	May 13, 1980	SCW show	Mobile, Alabama	1	98		
20	Jos LeDuc and Bob Armstrong	August 19, 1980	SCW show	Mobile, Alabama	1	N/A		
21	The Big Cs #1 and #2	September 1980	SCW show	N/A	1	N/A		
22	and The Assassin	N/A	SCW show	N/A	1	N/A		
23	deactivated	N/A	SCW show	N/A	N/A	N/A		

The following teams are also credited with holding the NWA Southern Tag Team championship but no specific time period has been documented.

- Ricky Gibson and Robert Gibson
- Rip Tyler and Eddie Sullivan
- Ron Fuller and Robert Fuller
- Bob Armstrong and Charlie Cook
- Ron Fuller and Terry Gibbs

== See also ==
- Gulf Coast Championship Wrestling / Southeast Championship Wrestling
- National Wrestling Alliance
