= Mid-South Louisiana Heavyweight Championship =

Professional wrestling championship

- The NWA Gulf Coast Louisiana Heavyweight Championship championship belt

Details
- Promotion: Mid-South Wrestling Association; NWA Deep South Louisiana; Elite Championship Wrestling
- Date established: October 16, 1964 (Re-established in 2011)
- Date retired: 1983 & 2000

Other names
- NWA Louisiana Heavyweight Championship (Gulf Coast); NWA Louisiana Heavyweight Championship (Tri-State); NWA Deep South Louisiana Heavyweight Championship; ECW Louisiana Heavyweight Championship; ECW World Heavyweight Championship
Statistics
- First champion: Bobby Fields
- Most reigns: Bobby Fields (7 reigns)
- Longest reign: Vordell Walker (371 days)
- Shortest reign: Purple Haze (24 hours)

The Mid-South Louisiana Heavyweight Championship was a secondary professional wrestling championship that was used and defended from 1964 though 1983. Initially, the championship originated in the National Wrestling Alliance (NWA)-affiliated Gulf Coast Championship Wrestling. During this time, it was referred to as the NWA Gulf Coast Louisiana Heavyweight Championship until 1972. Beginning in 1972, the title was used in the NWA affiliated NWA Tri-State then was called the NWA Tri-State Louisiana Heavyweight Championship from 1972 until 1979. In 1979, however, wrestler and promoter Bill Watts purchased the Tri-State territory and renamed it Mid-South Wrestling. Although Watts kept close ties with the NWA for purpose of having access to wrestling talent, he withdrew Mid-South from the NWA and, as a result, renamed all of the promotion's championships accordingly.

== Title history ==
Silver areas in the history indicate periods of unknown lineage.

Wrestler:	Times:	Date:	Location:	Notes:
NWA Gulf Coast Louisiana Championship
Al Lovelock	1	January 31, 1946	Monroe, LA	Defeats Jack Kennedy to become the first champion.
Vacant		June 1946		When Lovelock cannot defend.
Paul Murdock	1	July 2, 1946	Monroe, LA	Defeats Jerry Vallina; still champion as of August 26, 1946.
Bob Corby	1	June 18, 1955	Lake Charles, LA	Wins a 12-man tournament.
Chief Apache	1	August 21, 1955	Baton Rouge, LA	
Jack Curtis	1	November 1955	Baton Rouge, LA	Sometime before November 4, 1955.
Prince Emir	1	April 22, 1957	Monroe, LA	
Frank Hurley	1	May 1957		
Jack Curtis	2	August 12, 1957	Monroe, LA	
Phil Brummett	1	November 11, 1957	Monroe, LA	
Charley Laye	1	November 18, 1957	Monroe, LA	
Held up		December 9, 1957	Monroe, LA	By the District Athletic Commissioner after a match against Farmer Jones for using "very unfair tactics" but reinstated as the champion later in the month.
Bill Barney	1	December 23, 1957	Monroe, LA	
Bernard Hodgemyer	1	March 3, 1958	Monroe, LA	
Vacant		March 31, 1958		After Hodgemyer no-shows the scheduled defense and leaves the area.
Jerry Christy	1	June 16, 1958	Monroe, LA	Defeats Charley Laye in tournament final.
Vacant		September 1958		When Christy leaves the area.
Bill Barney	2	September 22, 1958	Monroe, LA	Defeats Al Massey.
Firpo Zybysko	1	June 1, 1959	Monroe, LA	Also defeats Chuck Benson on June 18, 1959 in New Orleans, LA, possibly for the vacant local recognition.
Chris Belkas	1	July 15, 1959	New Orleans, LA	
Vacant		October 1959		
Mickey Sharpe	1	November 5, 1959	New Orleans, LA	Defeats Firpo Zybysko in tournament final.
Firpo Zybysko	2	January 1960		Sometime between January 10, 1960 and January 18, 1960.
Adrien Baillargeon	1	February 1960	Lafayette, LA	Sometime before February 14, 1960.
Inactive		1960		After September 1960 when Baillargeon is billed as Southern champion.
Bobby Fields	1	October 16, 1964	Lafayette, LA	Defeats Terry Garvin in tournament final.
Sputnik Monroe	1	July 13, 1965	Baton Rouge, LA	
Bobby Fields	2	September 21, 1965	Baton Rouge, LA	
Danny McShain	1	October 22, 1965	Lafayette, LA	
Bobby Fields	3	December 3, 1965	Lafayette, LA	
Jack Dalton	1	February 17, 1966	Lafayette, LA	
Bobby Fields	4	May 17, 1966	Baton Rouge, LA	
Don Carson	1	July 12, 1966	Baton Rouge, LA	
Bobby Fields	5	July 19, 1966	Baton Rouge, LA	
Don Carson	2	August 2, 1966	Baton Rouge, LA	
Ken Lucas	1	October 5, 1966	Alexandria, LA	
Jack Dalton	2	November 1, 1966	Baton Rouge, LA	
Danny Little Bear	1	February 3, 1967	Lafayette, LA	
Ken Lucas	2	March 31, 1967	Lafayette, LA	
Stripped		July 25, 1967		Stripped for no defense.
Pepe Perez	1	July 25, 1967	?	Awarded.
Jack Dalton	3	October 10, 1967	Baton Rouge, LA	
Bobby Fields	6	November 28, 1967	Baton Rouge, LA	
Don Carson	3	December 12, 1967	Baton Rouge, LA	
Bob Kelly	1	December 29, 1967	Lafayette, LA	
Eddie Sullivan	1	January 23, 1968	Baton Rouge, LA	
Frank Dalton	1	January 30, 1968	Baton Rouge, LA	
Bobby Fields	7	February 6, 1968	Baton Rouge, LA	
Vacant		March 1, 1968		Gulf Coast stops promoting in Louisiana.
Big Bad John	1	November 18, 1968	Baton Rouge, LA	
Pepe Perez	2	December 3, 1968	Baton Rouge, LA	
Jerry Miller	1	February 1, 1969	Baton Rouge, LA	
Mighty Yankee	1	June 10, 1969	Baton Rouge, LA	
Frank Dalton	2	June 18, 1969	Baton Rouge, LA	
Jerry Miller	2	July 1969	Baton Rouge, LA	
Frank Dalton	3	July 22, 1969	Baton Rouge, LA	
In Monroe, LA Tom Jones defeats Jack Donovan via DQ on November 11, 1969 (champion unknown).
Jack Brisco	1	1969		
Duke Myers	1	April 21, 1970	Baton Rouge, LA	
Jerry Miller	3	May 19, 1970	Baton Rouge, LA	
Frank Dalton	4	July 11, 1970	Baton Rouge, LA	
Chuck Karbo	1	August 18, 1970	Baton Rouge, LA	
Frank Dalton	5	September 15, 1970	Baton Rouge, LA	
Chuck Karbo	2	November 25, 1970	Baton Rouge, LA	
Randy Curtis	1	May 4, 1971	Baton Rouge, LA	Last champion in the Gulf Coast lineage.
NWA Tri-State Louisiana Championship
Don Duffy	1	1972		
Assassin #1	1	April 27, 1978	Baton Rouge, LA	Wins tournament.
José Lothario	1	September 20, 1978	Monroe, LA	
Assassin #1	2	October 14, 1978	Shreveport, LA	
Jerry Stubbs	1	December 25, 1978	New Orleans, LA	
Mike George	1	April 21, 1979	New Orleans, LA	
Mid-South Louisiana Championship
Ernie Ladd	1	January 18, 1980	Shreveport, LA	
Junkyard Dog	1	March 14, 1980	Shreveport, LA	
Terry Gordy	1	April 22, 1980	Shreveport, LA	
Junkyard Dog	2	May 2, 1980	Baton Rouge, LA	
Vacated		May 22, 1980		JYD injured by The Fabulous Freebirds.
Ken Mantell	1	July 25, 1980	Shreveport, LA	Defeats Wahoo McDaniel in tournament final.
Johnny Mantell	1	1980		Defends the title for his brother Ken.
Jake Roberts	1	October 8, 1980	Shreveport, LA	
Ernie Ladd	2	January 16, 1981	Shreveport, LA	
Jimmy Garvin	1	March 4, 1981	Shreveport, LA	
Super Destroyer	1	May 1, 1981	Shreveport, LA	
Bob Roop	1	July 22, 1981	Shreveport, LA	
Great Kabuki	1	October 23, 1981 NLT	Shreveport, LA	
Junkyard Dog	3	December 7, 1981	New Orleans, LA	
Vacant		June 22, 1982		JYD wins North American Title.
Killer Khan	1	July 6, 1982	Baton Rouge, LA	
Mike Sharpe	1	September 18, 1982	Shreveport, LA	
Jim Duggan	1	October 13, 1982	Shreveport, LA	
Title Retired		1983		

== See also ==
- Universal Wrestling Federation
