= NWA United States Junior Heavyweight Championship (Mid-America version) =

Professional wrestling championship

Details
- Promotion: NWA Mid-America
- Date established: 1955
- Date retired: 1974
Statistics
- First champion(s): Jesse James
- Most reigns: Don Greene (9 reigns)

The NWA United States Junior Heavyweight Championship was a National Wrestling Alliance (NWA) sanctioned professional wrestling championship promoted by NWA Mid-America in and around their Tennessee and Kentucky territory from 1955 until 1974. The championship was limited to wrestlers in the Junior Heavyweight division, limited to wrestlers weighing less than 220 lb (100 kg). The NWA also sanctioned the NWA World Junior Heavyweight Championship, with the United States version serving as one of several local level Junior Heavyweight Championships. Because the championship was a professional wrestling championship, it was not won or lost competitively but instead by the decision of the bookers of a wrestling promotion. The championship was awarded after the chosen wrestler "won" a match to maintain the illusion that professional wrestling is a competitive sport.

== Title history ==
Key

Symbol	Meaning
#	The overall championship reign
Reign	The reign number for the specific set of wrestlers listed.
Event	The event promoted by the respective promotion in which the title changed hands
—	Used for vacated reigns in order to not count it as an official reign
	Indicates periods of unknown lineage
(NLT)	Indicates that the championship changed hands "No Later Than" a certain date.

#	Team (members)	Reign	Date	Days held	Location	Event	Notes
1	Jesse James	1	February 15, 1959 (NLT)	(Note: The date the championship was lost has not been documented and is too uncertain to calculate, at the least Jesse James held the championship for 8 days.)	(Note: The location of the match was not captured as part of the championship documentation.)	N/A	Announced as a new champion; still billed as champion as of on February 23, 1959
2	Yoshinosato	1	February 1962 (NLT)	(Note: The date the championship was won and lost has not been documented and is too uncertain to calculate.)		Live event	
3	Johnny Walker	1	May 1967	(Note: The date the championship was won has not been documented which means the championship reign lasted anywhere between 14 days and 44 days.)		Live event	Won a tournament sometime after May 16, 1967
4	Kenny Mack	1	June 14, 1967	14	Kingsport, Tennessee	Live event	
5	Johnny Walker	2	June 28, 1967	(Note: The date the championship was lost has not been documented which means the championship reign lasted anywhere between 1 day and −139 days.)	Kingsport, Tennessee	Live event	Still billed as champion on October 17, 1967
5	Johnny Walker	3	February 9, 1970 (NLT)	(Note: The date the championship was won has not been documented which means the championship reign lasted anywhere at most 107 days.)	Hawaii	Live event	Defeated Johnny Valentine.
7	Bobby Hart	1	May 27, 1970	62	Nashville, Tennessee	Live event	The title change was repeated in Memphis on May 30, 1970
8	Johnny Walker	4	July 28, 1970	(Note: The date the championship was vacated has not been documented which means the championship reign lasted anywhere between 1 day and 47 days.)	Louisville, Kentucky	Live event	
—	Vacated	N/A	1970	N/A	N/A	N/A	Championship vacated for undocumented reasons
9	Don Greene	1	September 14, 1970	(Note: The date the championship was lost has not been documented which means the championship reign lasted anywhere between 1 day and 7 days.)	Memphis, Tennessee	Live event	Defeated Dennis Hall in 4-man tournament final.
10	Johnny Walker	5	September 21, 1970 (NLT)	(Note: The date the championship was won has not been documented which means the championship reign lasted anywhere between 65 days and 72 days.)		Live event	
11	Bobby Hart	2	November 25, 1970	(Note: The date the championship was lost has not been documented which means the championship reign lasted anywhere between 1 day and 118 days.)	Nashville, Tennessee	Live event	
12	Don Greene	2	March 23, 1971 (NLT)	(Note: The date the championship was won and lost has not been documented which means the championship reign lasted anywhere between 1 day and 317 days.)		Live event	Still billed as champion on October 27, 1971
13	Len Rossi	1	February 3, 1972 (NLT)	(Note: The date the championship was won and lost has not been documented which means the championship reign lasted anywhere between 1 day and 97 days.)		Live event	
14	Tony Charles	1	May 10, 1972 (NLT)	(Note: The date the championship was won and lost has not been documented which means the championship reign lasted anywhere between 1 day and 113 days.)		Live event	
15	Don Greene	3	August 1972 (NLT)	(Note: The date the championship was won and lost has not been documented which means the championship reign lasted anywhere between 1 day and 66 days.)		Live event	
16	Johnny Walker	6	October 6, 1972 (NLT)	(Note: The date the championship was lost has not been documented which means the championship reign lasted anywhere between 11 days and 77 days.)		Live event	Change took place sometime between September 28 and October 16, 1972
17	Don Greene	4	October 17, 1972	279	Memphis, Tennessee	Live event	
18	Lorenzo Parente	1	July 23, 1973	(Note: The date the championship was lost has not been documented which means the championship reign lasted anywhere between 1 day and 7 days.)	Memphis, Tennessee	Live event	
19	Don Greene	5	July 1973	(Note: The date the championship was lost has not been documented which means the championship reign lasted anywhere between 1 day and 31 days.)		Live event	
20	Lorenzo Parente	2	August 1, 1973	(Note: The date the championship was lost has not been documented which means the championship reign lasted anywhere between 1 day and 61 days.)	Nashville, Tennessee	Live event	
21	Don Greene	6	October 2, 1973 (NLT)	(Note: The date the championship was lost has not been documented which means the championship reign lasted anywhere between 23 days and 84 days.)		Live event	
22	Intern #1	1	October 25, 1973	(Note: The date the championship was lost has not been documented which means the championship reign lasted anywhere between 1 day and 59 days.)	Chattanooga, Tennessee	Live event	
23	Don Greene	7	December 23, 1973 (NLT)	(Note: The date the championship was won has not been documented which means the championship reign lasted anywhere between 78 days and −58 days.)		Live event	
24	Ali Baba	1	March 11, 1974	(Note: The date the championship was lost has not been documented which means the championship reign lasted anywhere between 1 day and 9 days.)	Birmingham, Alabama	Live event	
25	Don Greene	8	March 1974	(Note: The date the championship was won has not been documented which means the championship reign lasted anywhere between 1 day and 8 days.)	Birmingham, Alabama	Live event	
26	Ali Baba	2	March 21, 1974	20	Florence, Alabama	Live event	Title change was repeated on March 27 in Nashville
27	Steve Kovac	1	April 10, 1974	24	Nashville, Tennessee	Live event	
28	Jerry Lawler	1	May 4, 1974	(Note: The date the championship was lost has not been documented which means the championship reign lasted anywhere between 1 day and 33 days.)	Chattanooga, Tennessee	Live event	
29	Don Greene	9	June 6, 1974 (NLT)	(Note: The date the championship was abandoned has not been documented which means the championship reign lasted anywhere between 25 days and 208 days.)		Live event	Still billed as champion in July 1974
—	Abandoned	N/A	1974	N/A	N/A	N/A	Championship abandoned.

== See also ==
- NWA World Junior Heavyweight Championship
- SMW United States Junior Heavyweight Championship, revival in Smoky Mountain Wrestling
