= Continental Championship Wrestling =

Professional wrestling promotion, active 1954–1989

- Acronym: CCW
- Founded: 1954
- Defunct: 1989
- Style: Professional wrestling
- Headquarters: Knoxville, Tennessee; Dothan, Alabama
- Founder(s): Roy Welch and Buddy Fuller
- Owner(s): Roy Welch and Buddy Fuller (1954–1959); Lee Fields (1960–1978); Ron Fuller Knoxville (1974–1980, 1985–1988); David Woods (1988–1989)
- Formerly: Gulf Coast Championship Wrestling; Southeastern Championship Wrestling

Continental Championship Wrestling was a professional wrestling promotion based in Knoxville, Tennessee, and Dothan, Alabama, from 1985 until 1989, owned by Ron Fuller. The promotion evolved out of the NWA-affiliated Southeastern Championship Wrestling and Gulf Coast Championship Wrestling territories owned by Fuller, who purchased the Knoxville territory from John Cazana in 1974 and the Alabama/Florida territory in 1977. When Fuller sold the promotion to David Woods in 1988, the name was changed to Continental Wrestling Federation.

== History ==
=== The Gulf Coast years (1954–1974) ===
Nashville promoter Roy Welch had purchased the Mobile-Pensacola end of Leroy McGuirk's Tri-State Wrestling. Unlike McGuirk, who only promoted in the Mobile-Pensacola area on special occasions called spot shows, Welch decided to make promoting in Mobile-Pensacola a frequent attraction in the summer. However, due to his obligations in Nashville, his son Buddy Fuller (Edward Welch) was made booker for Mobile-Pensacola, and Fuller eventually expanded the territory into Mississippi-Louisiana as well.

At this point, the territory didn't even have a name, its own belts, or even its own wrestlers (aside from members of The Welch Family of course). They often relied on wrestlers and champions from Buddy's and their Uncle Lester Welch's territory. He ran in places like Tampa, Florida, and Atlanta, Georgia (which would eventually become Championship Wrestling from Florida and Georgia Championship Wrestling), as well getting help from his father in Nashville, Tennessee, and some occasional help from his Uncles Herb and Jack. These early attempts would start to unravel when Buddy Fuller failed to make payments to the territory from his father Roy Welch. Buddy's cousin Lee Fields (Albert Lee Hatfield) would save the territory and gave it the name "Gulf Coast Championship Wrestling".

Lee Fields would eventually buy the territory from Roy Welch and Buddy Fuller, and run shows in the area for almost two decades with Rocky McGuire booking Dothan-Panama City and Bob Kelly booking Mobile-Pensacola and Mississippi after a falling out with promoters in Louisiana with Mobile-Pensacola only running in the summer months. Kelly turned the promotion around from holding monthly and seasonal shows in a few towns which only drew a few hundred people to holding weekly shows in a different town night after night with local television exposure in each market, which led to each arena drawing thousands. Bob Kelly left the wrestling business in 1976 to enter real estate and spend more time with family, and Lee Fields found it more difficult to operate both his wrestling promotion and Mobile International Speedway at the same time.. So he sold it to his cousin Ron Fuller around 1977-1978.

=== The Southeastern years (1974–1985) ===
In 1974, Ron Fuller purchased Southeastern Championship Wrestling based in Knoxville, Tennessee from John Cazana, where he focused mainly on the east Tennessee area. In 1977, Ron Fuller took over the territory his grandfather and father had founded when GCCW folded and Fuller expanded the SECW to run in the Southern Alabama, Northern Florida area in addition the Eastern Tennessee territory he already established. This was initially labelled ”the Southern Division” of the SECW treating them as two separate entities despite the original plan to run a talent exchange between the two involving talent spending sixteen months in one end of the territory and then spend eight months in another to regain momentum after losing steam in the previous one.

In June 1979, several members of the talent roster and behind the scenes personnel left SECW over frustrations involving backstage politics with Ron's brother Robert Fuller who was considered lazy in terms of booking the territory, and spent many nights partying and felt his spot in Southeastern was owed to him since he was a member of The Welch/Fuller family. Led by Bob Roop, Ronnie Garvin, Bob Orton Jr. and Boris Malenko, All-Star Championship Wrestling fought a six-month promotional war over the Knoxville territory. Many of these defectors later joined the Kentucky based outlaw promotion International Championship Wrestling owned and operated by Angelo Poffo.

After this, the Knoxville end of Southeastern experienced financial losses, and sold to promotions such as Jim Crockett Promotions and Georgia Championship Wrestling for the next five years. Fuller then made Birmingham his main end of the territory with the Dothan end continuing to flourish, giving early exposure to future stars such as The Fabulous Freebirds, rising stars in the territory along the lines of Austin Idol, and appearances by Ric Flair who would defend the NWA World Heavyweight Title in the area each year.

=== The Continental years (1985–1989) ===
==== Continental Championship Wrestling (1985–1988) ====
Five years later, Fuller decided that it was time to reach beyond the Southern Alabama/Northern Florida area and re-purchased the Knoxville end of the territory, with this expansion came a name change to Continental Championship Wrestling. After a failed negotiation with CBS, he settled on moving the television show out of the small television studio and into the big arenas where they did house shows in order to give the promotion a national look and feel. While the name Southeastern restricted the promotion to a more regional feel, the name Continental gave fans the impression they toured all over the country, except Alaska and Hawaii.

==== Continental Wrestling Federation (1988–1989) ====
In 1988, WCOV-TV owner David Woods bought the controlling interest in the promotion from Ron Fuller, and he renamed it Continental Wrestling Federation in a further attempt to compete with Vince McMahon and appear to resemble a nationwide promotion, even to the point of getting a national TV deal with Financial News Network. Episodes also aired every Monday at 1:30 a.m. ET on the Sunshine Network, a regional sports cable channel that served the Southeastern United States. Their last TV episode aired on November 25, 1989. The promotion closed after their final show on December 6, 1989.

== Legacy ==
Despite many huge angles over the years, this territory often has the status as "the lost promotion". Such obscurity was due to the lack of media coverage during the Gulf Coast and Southeastern years since both Lee Fields and Ron Fuller believed that their promotions should not be covered by wrestling magazines and often did not allow reporters in the locker room to interview the wrestlers. This was to prevent the exposure to kayfabe and preserve the illusion of character gimmicks in the area. However, Fuller relented with the changeover to Continental in order to get national exposure for the promotion from the magazines. Such exposure was at an all-time high during the Eddie Gilbert period.

Due to the expensive nature of archiving at television stations before the home video boom of the 1980s, much of the footage from the Gulf Coast era and the Knoxville portion of Southeastern no longer exists, despite a few bits of rare footage turning up here and there. However, almost all of the Dothan portion of Southeastern along with the majority of Continental footage still exists. They are still owned by David Woods and Woods Communications.

== Alumni ==
- Johnathan Holliday
- The Alaskan Hunters
- André the Giant
- Randy Rose
- Pat Rose
- Les Thatcher
- Lee Fields
- Dynamite Dick Dunn
- Ronnie Garvin
- Dick Slater
- Butch Malone
- Bob Armstrong
- Jos LeDuc
- Ron Fuller
- Robert Fuller
- Whitey Caldwell
- Jerry "Mr. Olympia" Stubbs
- Kevin Sullivan
- Paul Orndorff
- Tony Charles
- Mongolian Stomper
- Ron Miller
- Ron Wright
- Boris Malenko
- Bob Orton, Jr
- Toru Tanaka
- Mr. Fuji
- Jim Dalton
- Bob Roop
- Brickhouse Brown
- Norvell Austin
- Sterling Golden
- Tom Prichard
- The Bullet
- Wendell Cooley
- Brad Armstrong
- Scott Armstrong
- Steve Armstrong
- Tracy Smothers
- Tommy Rich
- Johnny Rich
- Tim Horner
- Larry Hamilton
- Bill Kazmaier
- Frankie Lancaster
- Jimmy Golden
- Dutch Mantell
- Nature Boy Buddy Landel
- Jody "The Flame" Hamilton
- Jerry Stubbs
- Adrian Street
- The Midnight Rockers (Michaels/Jannetty)
- The New Guinea Headhunters
- Don Wright
- Davey Rich
- Miss Brenda Britton
- Miss Linda
- Dirty White Girl
- Moondog Spot
- The Storm Trooper
- Doug Furnas
- Dennis Condrey
- Phil Hickerson
- David Schultz
- Austin Idol
- Nightmare Danny Davis
- Willie B. Hert
- Shane Douglas
- Rikki Nelson
- Mark Young
- Eddie Gilbert
- Tony "Dirty White Boy" Anthony
- Brian Lee
- "Nightmare" Ken Wayne
- Lord Humongous
- Alan Martin
- Moondog Rex
- The D.I. (Bob Carter)
- The Wild Samoans (Sika & Kokina)
- Todd Morton
- Downtown Bruno, manager
- Paul E. Dangerously, manager
- Missy Hyatt, announcer
- Ricky Morton
- Gordon Solie, announcer
- Charlie Platt, announcer
- Robert Gibson
- Ed Faulk, referee
- Rick Gibson
- Gorgeous George, Jr.
- Sir Dudley Clements
- Cowboy Bob Kelly
- Ken Lucas
- Lester Welch
- Bobby Fields
- Buddy Fuller
- Herb Welch
- Mike Boyette
- Billy Spears
- Carl Fergie
- Cowboy Bob Kelly
- Mario Galentto
- The Wrestling Pro
- Don Fargo
- Eduardo Perez (wrestler)
- Duke Miller
- The Mysterious Medic
- Curtis Smith
- "Rotten" Ron Starr
- Don Duffy
- The Interns (Bill Bowman and Joe Turner)
- Ron Carson
- Eddie Sullivan and Rip Tyler
- The Dirty Daltons
- Rick Conners
- Maw Bass
- Spider Galento
- Ken Ramey
- Dr. Jerry Graham
- Ric Flair
- Jerry Lawler
- Michael Hayes
- Arn Anderson
- Superstar Bill Dundee
- Roy Lee Welch
- Tommy Lane
- Mike Davis
- Jamie Dundee
- Mr. Wrestling II
- Nelson Royal
- Mr. Knoxville
- Hector Guerrero
- Rip Rogers
- Terrance Garvin
- Chris Colt
- Shogun Warrior
- The Tennessee Stud
- Terry Gordy
- Jacques Rougeau
- Curtis Hughes
- Tommy Weathers
- Mac Mcurray
- Phil Rainey, announcer
- Kerry Von Erich
- The Great Kabuki
- Porkchop Cash
- Bill Ash
- The Honky Tonk Man
- Mike Stallings
- Cowboy Ron Bass
- Jonathan Boyd
- Luke Williams
- Stan Lane
- The Von Brauners
- the Tennessee superstars
- Sheik Abdullah
- Ray Candy
- Masa Saito
- The gladiator
- Jim Dalton
- Mick "Cactus Jack" Foley
- The Superstar

== Championships ==
=== GCCW (1954–1974) ===
- NWA World Heavyweight Championship
- NWA World Junior Heavyweight Championship
- NWA World Tag Team Championship
- NWA United States Tag Team Championship (Gulf Coast version) (1965–1974)
- NWA Southeastern Heavyweight Championship
- NWA Southern Junior Heavyweight Championship
- NWA Southern Tag Team Championship (Gulf Coast Version) (1955–1967)
- NWA Gulf Coast Heavyweight Championship
- NWA Gulf Coast Tag Team Championship (1967–1977)
- NWA Gulf Coast 6-Man Tag Team Championship (1975)
- NWA Gulf Coast Brass Knuckles Championship (1971)
- NWA Gulf Coast Martial Arts Championship (1975)
- NWA Southeast Alabama Heavyweight Championship (1962–1974)
- NWA Alabama Tag Team Championship (1970, 1977)
- NWA Louisiana Heavyweight Championship (1964–1968)
- NWA Mississippi Heavyweight Championship (1958–1976)
- NWA Mississippi Tag Team Championship (1968–1973)
- NWA Tennessee Tag Team Championship (1967–1977)
- NWA City of Dothan Heavyweight Championship (1973–1977)
- NWA City of Laurel Tag Team Championship (1969–1971)
- NWA City of Mobile Heavyweight Championship (1969–1975)
- NWA City of Pensacola Heavyweight Championship (1970–1975)
- NWA Panama City Heavyweight Championship (1970–1975)

=== SECW and CCW (1974–1988) ===
- NWA World Heavyweight Championship (- 1987)
- AWA World Heavyweight Championship (1987–1988)
- NWA World Junior Heavyweight Championship (- 1987)
- NWA Southeastern Heavyweight Championship
- NWA Southeastern Heavyweight Championship (Southern Division: 1978–1980)
- NWA Continental Heavyweight Championship (1984–1987)
- NWA Continental Tag Team Championship (1986–1988)
- NWA Southeastern Television Championship
- NWA Southeastern Tag Team Championship
- NWA Continental Tag Team Championship
- NWA Southern Tag Team Championship (Southern Division) (1978–1980)
- NWA Southeastern Brass Knuckles Championship (1983)
- NWA Southeastern United States Junior Heavyweight Championship (1976–1989)
- NWA Alabama Heavyweight Championship (1974–1988)
- NWA Southeastern Tennessee Heavyweight Championship (1987–1988)
- NWA Tennessee Tag Team Championship (1967–1977)
- NWA Southeastern 6-Man Tag Team Championship

=== CWF (1988–1989) ===
- AWA World Heavyweight Championship
- CWF Heavyweight Championship
- CWF Tag Team Championship
- United States Junior Heavyweight Championship

== See also ==
- List of National Wrestling Alliance territories
- List of independent wrestling promotions in the United States
