= Stud Stable =

Professional wrestling stable

Stable
- Members: Robert Fuller; Jimmy Golden
- Name: Stud Stable
- Former members: See below

The Stud Stable was a professional wrestling heel stable in Southeast Championship Wrestling, the Continental Wrestling Association, Smoky Mountain Wrestling, World Championship Wrestling, and Major League Wrestling.

== History ==
=== Southeastern Championship Wrestling (1982–1986) ===
The Stud Stable was first formed by "The Original Tennessee Stud" Ron Fuller in Southeastern Championship Wrestling in 1982. His version included Fuller's cousin Jimmy Golden, a young Arn Anderson and the masked Lord Humongous (not Sid Vicious, but the original Lord Humongous). They feuded with "Mr. Olympia" Jerry Stubbs, Austin Idol and Bob Armstrong, as well as Armstrong's sons, Brad, Scott and Steve.

=== Continental Wrestling Association (1986–1990) ===
The next version was created by Ron's brother Robert Fuller in 1986. Between 1986 and 1989 in the Continental Wrestling Association, members included Fuller, Golden, Dutch Mantel, Wendell Cooley, Detroit Demolition, Tom Prichard, the Flame, Cactus Jack, Brian Lee and Gary Young. They feuded with the Armstrong family, Cooley and the Nightmares in Continental, and with Jerry Lawler and Jeff Jarrett in Memphis.

=== Smoky Mountain Wrestling (1991–1993) ===
In 1991, another version of the Stud Stable was formed in Smoky Mountain Wrestling that contained Robert Fuller, Jimmy Golden, and Dutch Mantel. The Stud Stable feuded with the Rock 'n' Roll Express and the Heavenly Bodies. They started out as pure heels, but became 'tweeners, feuding with both heels and babyfaces. The group disbanded when Robert Fuller went to WCW to become a manager in 1993.

=== World Championship Wrestling (1994–1996) ===
The fourth version was created in World Championship Wrestling when Robert Fuller was known as "Col. Rob Parker". He formed the stable in 1994 with Arn Anderson, Terry Funk, Golden as Bunkhouse Buck, Blacktop Bully and Meng, who was Parker's bodyguard. This stable feuded heavily with Dusty and Dustin Rhodes until late 1994 when Funk left and was replaced by Dick Slater. They have also feuded with Brian Pillman. Blacktop Bully left in March 1995 after feuding with Dustin, as both were let go by WCW. In August 1995, Meng left (eventually to join the Dungeon of Doom) and Anderson went to rejoin Ric Flair and eventually reform The Four Horsemen. The Stud Stable feuded with Harlem Heat over the WCW World Tag Team Championship in which Buck and Slater won. They were also feuding because of a love/hate relationship between Parker and the Heat's manager, Sister Sherri. Parker eventually dumped Slater and Buck for Martel and the stable was broken up when Fuller left WCW in 1997.

=== Major League Wrestling (2018) ===
In 2018, MLW created a new version of the Stud Stable with Col. Rob Parker managing a tag team known as The Dirty Blondes and Jake Hager.

== Members and incarnations ==
- Continental Championship Wrestling (SCW / CCW / CWF)
  - Southeastern Championship Wrestling (1982–1986)
    - Ron Fuller (manager)
    - Robert Fuller
    - Jimmy Golden
    - Arn Anderson
  - Continental Championship Wrestling (1986–1988)
    - Robert Fuller
    - Jimmy Golden
    - Dutch Mantel
    - "Wildcat" Wendell Cooley
    - Detroit Demolition
    - Tom Prichard
    - The Flame
    - Jerry Stubbs
  - Continental Wrestling Federation/United States Wrestling Association (1988–1990)
    - Robert Fuller
    - Jimmy Golden
    - Cactus Jack
    - Brian Lee
    - "Gorgeous" Gary Young
    - Phil Hickerson
    - Brickhouse Brown
    - The Rock 'n' Roll RPMs
    - Sid Eudy
    - Downtown Bruno (manager)
    - Miss Sylvia (manager)
- Smoky Mountain Wrestling (1991–1993)
  - Robert Fuller
  - Jimmy Golden
  - Dutch Mantel
- World Championship Wrestling (1994–1996)
  - Colonel Robert Parker (Robert Fuller) (manager)
  - Meng (bodyguard)
  - Bunkhouse Buck (Jimmy Golden)
  - Arn Anderson
  - "Stunning" Steve Austin
  - Terry Funk
  - Dick Slater
  - Barry Windham
  - Blacktop Bully
  - Kurasawa
  - The Mauler/Mike Enos
  - The Amazing French Canadians (Jacques Rougeau, Jr. and Carl Ouellet)
- Major League Wrestling (2018)
  - The Dirty Blondes (Michael Patrick and Leo Brien)
  - Mike Parrow
  - Jake Hager

== Championships and accomplishments ==
- Continental Wrestling Association
  - NWA Mid-America Heavyweight Championship (2 times) Dutch Mantel
  - CWA Tag Team Championship (3 times)- Cactus Jack and Gary Young (1 time) Robert Fuller and Jimmy Golden (2 times)
- Southeastern Championship Wrestling
  - NWA Southeastern Heavyweight Championship (1 time) – Ron Fuller
  - NWA Southeastern Television Championship (1 time) – Robert Fuller
  - NWA Southeastern Tag Team Championship (7 times) – Robert Fuller and Jimmy Golden
- Continental Championship Wrestling
  - NWA Southeastern Heavyweight Championship (Southern Division) (1 Time) – Ron Fuller
  - NWA Alabama Heavyweight Championship (6 times) – Wendell Cooley (3 times), Jerry Stubbs (1 time), Tom Prichard (2 times)
  - NWA Southeast Continental Heavyweight Championship (3 times) – Jerry Stubbs (1 time), Wendell Cooley (1 time), Dutch Mantel (1 time)
  - NWA Southeastern Junior Heavyweight Championship (5 times) – Tom Prichard
  - NWA Southeastern Heavyweight Championship (Northern Division) (1 time) – Dutch Mantel
  - NWA Southeast Continental Tag Team Championship (2 times) – Robert Fuller and Jimmy Golden
- Continental Wrestling Federation
  - NWA Southeastern United States Junior Heavyweight Championship (1 time) – Downtown Bruno
  - CWF Tag Team Championship (1 time) – Jimmy Golden and Brian Lee
- World Championship Wrestling
  - WCW United States Heavyweight Championship (2 times) – Steve Austin
  - WCW World Television Championship (1 time) – Arn Anderson
  - WCW World Tag Team Championship (1 time) – Dick Slater and Bunkhouse Buck
