= NWA Southeastern Heavyweight Championship =

Professional wrestling championship

Details
- Promotion: Southeast Championship Wrestling
- Date established: March 10,1978
- Date retired: After May 4, 1980

Other name(s)
- NWA Gulf Coast Heavyweight Championship
Statistics
- First champion(s): Bob Armstrong
- Final champion(s): Mongolian Stomper
- Most reigns: Ron Fuller (5 reigns

The NWA Southeastern Heavyweight Championship or Gulf Coast Heavyweight Championship was one of two identically named regional championship titles, a Southern and Northern division promoted by Southeast Championship Wrestling. The Southern division was established in 1978 as a continuation of the NWA Gulf Coast Heavyweight Championship and existed until its merge with the Northern division in 1980. The unified championship continued to be active until 1988 when it was abandoned.

== Title history ==
Key
No.	Overall reign number
Reign	Reign number for the specific champion
Days	Number of days held

No.	Champion	Championship change			Reign statistics		Notes	Ref.
No.	Champion	Date	Event	Location	Reign	Days	Notes	Ref.
1	Bob Armstrong	March 10, 1978	SCW show	Dothan, Alabama	1	N/A	defeated David Schultz to become the first champion	
2	Ken Lucas	April 1978	SCW show	N/A	1	N/A	defeated David Schultz to win title	
3	Ron Fuller	April 5, 1978	SCW show	Mobile, Alabama	1	70	Won Tournament	
4	Bob Armstrong	June 14, 1978	SCW show	Mobile, Alabama	2	35		
5	Ron Fuller	July 19, 1978	SCW show	Mobile, Alabama	2	56		
6	Bob Armstrong	September 13, 1978	SCW show	Mobile, Alabama	3	N/A		
7	Mongolian Stomper	October 1978	SCW show	N/A	1	N/A		
8	Masked Superstar	1978	SCW show	N/A	1	N/A		
Championship history is unrecorded from November 19, 1978 to April 27, 1979.
9	David Schultz	April 27, 1979	SCW show	Dothan, Alabama	1	7		
10	Ron Slinker	May 4, 1979	SCW show	Dothan, Alabama	1	2		
11	David Schultz	May 6, 1979	SCW show	Mobile, Alabama	2	N/A	Title change in dispute as Shutlz is recorded defending his title in Mobile, Alabama two days later	
Championship history is unrecorded from May 6, 1979 to May 23, 1979.
12	Ox Baker	May 23, 1979	SCW show	Mobile, Alabama	1	14		
13	Terry Boulder	June 6, 1979	SCW show	Mobile, Alabama	1	7		
14	Austin Idol	June 13, 1979	SCW show	Mobile, Alabama	1	N/A		
Championship history is unrecorded from June 13, 1979 to October 31, 1979.
15	Terry Boulder	October 31, 1979	SCW show	N/A	2	N/A		
16	Toru Tanaka	November 1979	SCW show	N/A	1	N/A		
17	Bob Armstrong	November 23, 1979	SCW show	Mobile, Alabama	4	14		
18	Jos Leduc	December 7, 1979	SCW show	Mobile, Alabama	1	60		
19	Ron Fuller	February 5, 1980	SCW show	Mobile, Alabama	4	25		
20	Jimmy Golden	March 1, 1980	SCW show	Dothan, Alabama	1	3		
21	Ron Fuller	March 4, 1980	SCW show	Mobile, Alabama	5	N/A		
22	Jos Leduc	March 16, 1980 (NLT)	SCW show	N/A	2	N/A		
23	Mongolian Stomper	April 1, 1980	SCW show	Mobile, Alabama	2	21		
24	Georgia Jawjacker	April 22, 1980	SCW show	Mobile, Alabama	5	12		
25	Mongolian Stomper	May 4, 1980	SCW show	N/A	3	N/A		
—		N/A	—	—				

== See also ==
- National Wrestling Alliance
- Gulf Coast Championship Wrestling
