= Jeff Van Camp Sr. =

American police officer and retired professional wrestler

Personal information
- Born: Jeff Van Camp; April 3, 1962 (age 64) New Albany, Indiana, United States
- Education: University of Louisville; Troy University
- Children: 2 (including Jeff Van Camp)

Professional wrestling career
- Ring name(s): Jeff Van Camp; Lord Humongous
- Billed height: 6 ft 5 in (196 cm)
- Billed weight: 315 lb (143 kg)
- Trained by: Jerry Lawler
- Debut: 1983
- Retired: August 3, 1985

Jeff Van Camp Sr. (born April 3, 1962) is an American police officer and retired professional wrestler. He is best known for his appearances with the World Wrestling Association and Southeast Championship Wrestling in the mid-1980s under his real name and the ring name Lord Humongous.

== Early life ==
Van Camp attended the University of Louisville in Louisville, Kentucky, studying criminal justice. He played American football for the Louisville Cardinals as a defensive end in 1980 and 1981. His football career ended after he suffered a knee injury.

During his football career, Van Camp worked part-time as a security guard at the Louisville Gardens. During a show by the professional wrestling promotion Continental Championship Wrestling, his large frame impressed several of the wrestlers, and promoter Jerry Lawler invited him to come to the Mid-South Coliseum in Memphis, Tennessee, to train as a professional wrestler.

== Professional wrestling career ==
Van Camp was trained to wrestle by Lawler, making his debut for Continental Championship Wrestling in 1983.

In 1984, Van Camp joined the Indianapolis-based World Wrestling Association. On January 7, 1984, Van Camp and Dick the Bruiser defeated Abdullah the Great and Jerry Valiant to win the WWA World Tag Team Championship. The duo held the championship until September of that year where they were defeated by the Wild Warriors (Mad Maxx and Super Maxx).

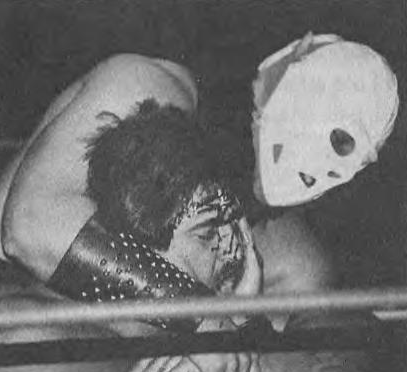
Van Camp as Lord Humongous (tioo right) choking Wendell Cooley, c. 1985

In late 1984, Van Camp moved on to a wrestling promotion closer to his home in Florida as he began working for Southeast Championship Wrestling (SECW) out of Alabama. In SECW he was given a new ring character, Lord Humongous, a menacing masked wrestler inspired by an evil gang leader in the 1981 movie Mad Max 2: The Road Warrior. He was brought in by SECW's main bad guy Ron Fuller to target the promotions top good guys. His first storyline feud saw him win the NWA Alabama Heavyweight Championship from Porkchop Cash in September, 1984 only weeks after starting with the promotion. He would hold on to the title into 1985 where he would lose it to and then regain it from Johnny Rich as part of an ongoing storyline. On March 4, 1985 Austin Idol ended Lord Humongous' second run with the championship. Once Lord Humongous regained the title on April 6, 1985, he became involved in a storyline where Ron Fuller started to feel remorse over the Humongous' actions. This led to Fuller turning face and starting to fight against Lord Humongous. Fuller ended Humongous's third and final fall on June 17, 1985. Following that, Humongous moved onto a storyline feud with The Flame, from whom he won the NWA Southeast Continental Heavyweight Championship in July 1985, only to lose it back to the Flame a few weeks later. Van Camp's final match took place on August 3, 1985, when The Flame defeated him in a loser leaves town match, with Van Camp retiring thereafter to start a family with his wife.

In 2020, he was inducted as the first member of the Wiregrass Wrestling Alliance Hall of Fame; out of Dothan, AL.

== Policing career ==
Van Camp Sr. began working for the Pensacola Police Department in Pensacola, Florida, in 1986.

In 1989, he became deputy sheriff for the Escambia County Sheriff's Office in Escambia County, Florida. During his tenure with the Escambia County Sheriff's Office he served as vice president of the Florida Association of Crime Stoppers in 1998 and president from 2004 to 2006. he authored the Florida Crime Stoppers Act - an act imposing a surcharge on criminal fines to provide funding for the Florida Association of Crime Stoppers - which was passed by the Florida Legislature in 1998, making Van Camp Sr. one of a small number of serving police officers to successfully draft new legislation. In 1996, Van Camp Sr. created and went on to appear in Wanted Fugitives, a show airing on Blab Television modeled after America's Most Wanted that resulted in over 4,000 arrests.

Van Camp Sr. left the Escambia County Sheriff's Office in 2012. He worked as a police officer for the Okaloosa County Airport Police Department in Okaloosa County, Florida, before joining the Ocean Ridge Police Department in Ocean Ridge, Florida, in 2015.

== Personal life ==
Van Camp Sr. has two children, Jeff and Brandon, both of whom have had successful football careers at the collegiate level.

Van Camp Sr. made an unsuccessful bid for Sheriff of neighboring Santa Rosa County in 2007.

== Championships and accomplishments ==
- South East Championship Wrestling / Continental Championship Wrestling
  - NWA Alabama Heavyweight Championship (3 times)
  - NWA Southeast Continental Heavyweight Championship (1 time)
- World Wrestling Association
  - WWA World Tag Team Championship (1 time) – with Dick the Bruiser
- Wiregrass Wrestling Alliance Hall of Fame
