= Steve Armstrong =

American professional wrestler (born 1965)

Personal information
- Born: Steven James; March 16, 1965 (age 61) Marietta, Georgia, U.S.
- Parent: Bob Armstrong (father)
- Family: Brad Armstrong (brother); Road Dogg (brother); Scott Armstrong (brother)

Professional wrestling career
- Ring name(s): The Bullet; The Falcon; Lance Cassidy; Steve Armstrong; Steve James
- Billed height: 6 ft 1 in (185 cm)
- Billed weight: 224 lb (102 kg)
- Billed from: Marietta, Georgia "The great state of Texas" (as Lance Cassidy)
- Trained by: Bob Armstrong
- Debut: 1983
- Retired: 2015

Steven James (born March 16, 1965), better known by his ring name Steve Armstrong, is an American professional wrestler. He is the son of fellow wrestler "Bullet" Bob Armstrong, and has three brothers who also wrestled: Scott, Brad, and Brian.

== Professional wrestling career ==
=== Early career (1983–1987) ===
Steve Armstrong started wrestling in 1983 in the Alabama-based Southeast Championship Wrestling promotion. He formed a team called the "Rat Patrol" with Johnny Rich and they feuded with Ron Fuller's Stud Stable (Jerry Stubbs and Super Olympia).

=== Championship Wrestling from Florida (1987) ===
After Tracy Smothers joined Championship Wrestling from Florida in February 1987 he was immediately paired with Steve Armstrong as the "Wild-Eyed Southern Boys". Their first match came on February 17 in Tampa, Florida, where they lost to The New Breed. However four days later The Southern Boys defeated The New Breed to gain their first ever championship, the NWA Florida Tag Team Championship. Smothers and Armstrong held the belts until March 15, when they were defeated by The MOD Squad. In June they unsuccessfully challenged for the NWA United States Tag Team Championship, losing to The Midnight Express (Stan Lane & Bobby Eaton).

=== Continental Wrestling Association (1985, 1987) ===
In 1985, he and his brother, Scott, made their debut in Memphis. They had a feud with Pat Rose and Tom Prichard.

The Southern Boys would make a stop in the CWA, where they faced Rough & Ready in October 1987. During this time they feuded with The Stud Stable.

=== New Japan Pro-Wrestling (1988–1989) ===
After a brief stop again in the CWA without Armstrong, the Southern Boys went on tour in New Japan Pro-Wrestling. Smothers first match for the promotion was as a singles wrestler, where he defeated Osamu Kido on July 15, 1988 at the NJPW Summer Fight Series 1988 event. As a team the Southern Boys experienced success, beating Kantaro Hoshino and Osamu Kido, Kuniaki Kobayashi & Norio Honaga, Kensuke Sasaki and Norio Honaga, and Seiji Sakaguchi and Tatsutoshi Goto. Their final match came on December 9, 1988 at the NJPW Japan Cup Series 1988 – Tag 21 television show, where they lost to Kotetsu Yamamoto and Yoshinari Tsuji. During the tour they worked in the main event against the legendary Antonio Inoki.

=== World Championship Wrestling (1990–1992) ===
Following a January 1990 tour of New Japan Pro-Wrestling, Smothers reunited with Steve Armstrong. The duo made their national debuts for World Championship Wrestling on April 23, 1990 in a dark match at a Main Event/WCW WorldWide taping in Marietta, GA. Wrestling as "The Wild-Eyed Southern Boys", their first television appearance came on May 12 at a World Championship Wrestling taping where they defeated Kevin Sullivan and Cactus Jack via disqualification. On May 20 on the Main Event the new team upset WCW United States Tag Team Champions The Midnight Express in a non-title match. Later that month they entered a house show series against WCW World Tag Team Champions Doom, but were unsuccessful in their efforts.

On June 13, 1990, they faced off against The Fabulous Freebirds at the Clash of the Champions XI "Coastal Crush" show and were victorious. Jimmy Garvin and Michael Hayes were able to gain a measure of revenge by defeating them on the June 16, 1990 episode of WCW Worldwide after holding the tights. An appearance by the Midnight Express' manager Jim Cornette would transition the Southern Boys to their first feud. This led to the first PPV showing for Smothers and Armstrong, as they fell to The Midnight Express on July 13, 1990 at the Great American Bash 1990. Smothers and Armstrong would continue to feud with the Midnight Express before transitioning to a series against the self-declared "Southern Champions" The Fabulous Freebirds. In August they engaged in a "best of three" series against The Freebirds, and on September 5, 1990, they defeated Hayes and Garvin at Clash of the Champions XII "Fall Brawl: Mountain Madness".

On the September 22, 1990 episode of World Championship Wrestling the Southern Boys fell once more to The Midnight Express in a match where the winner received a United States Tag Team Championship shot. On the October 6 episode of The Main Event, the duo fell to the newly arrived Nasty Boys. Their televised slump continued at the Halloween Havoc 1990, where they were defeated by The Master Blasters after Jim Cornette interfered in the match. Cornette and Stan Lane departed from the promotion immediately afterwards, and there was no resolution to the Southern Boys/Midnight Express storyline. They moved instead to a house show series with the Blasters (Al Green and a rookie Kevin Nash).

1991 saw an immediate reversal of fortunes for the young team. In January they opened the year with several wins over The Master Blasters, and on February 24, 1991 at WrestleWar 1991 they beat The Royal Family (Jack Victory and Rip Morgan). A few days earlier at TV taping in Montgomery, Alabama they were renamed The Young Pistols. In March they began a house show series against Moondog Rex and Dutch Mantell, the latter who would ultimately become The Desperados. On May 19, 1991, their televised win streak came to an end when they were defeated by The Freebirds at SuperBrawl I in a match to claim the vacated United States Tag Team Championship after "Badstreet" (a masked Brad Armstrong) interfered. This began a renewed feud with the Freebirds, and on June 12, 1991, they teamed with Tom Zenk to defeat Michael Hayes, Jimmy Garvin, and Badstreet at Clash of the Champions XV.

That summer an injury to Scott Steiner led to the WCW World Tag Team Championship being vacated. On August 3, 1991, the Young Pistols participated in a tournament to crown new champions; they were defeated by The York Foundation. On September 21, 1991, they received a non-title match against the eventual winners of that tournament, The Enforcers (Arn Anderson and Larry Zbyszko but were unsuccessful. That fall, the Pistols continued to face The York Foundation on the house show circuit.

At Halloween Havoc 1991 the Pistols began to show the first signs of an attitude change, stating that they did not care who was the "WCW Phantom" (eventually revealed that night as Rick Rude), but were instead waiting for a United States Tag Team Championship title shot against The WCW Patriots (Firebreaker Chip and Todd Champion). On the December 8, 1991 episode of The Main Event they finally received their shot. After initially being declared the winners, the match was restarted and the Patriots won. The following week they declared that they were unconcerned with what the fans thought, confirming a heel turn. Later that night the Pistols defeated the WCW Patriots to win the United States Tag Team Championship.

The Young Pistols entered 1992 as champions and defeated The Patriots in another rematch in the January 18 episode of WCW Pro. On January 25 on WCW Worldwide they beat former champions Tom Zenk and Brian Pillman. However, their run with the titles ended on the February 16 episode of WCW Pro where they lost the championship to Ron Simmons and Big Josh. In February the Young Pistols moved to a house show series against The Steiner Brothers. They were scheduled to team with The Vegas Connection (Vinnie Vegas and Dallas Page) in an eight-man tag team match against El Gigante, Big Josh, Johnny B. Badd, and Mike Graham at SuperBrawl II on February 29; however, the match was cancelled.

In April 1992, Armstrong departed WCW, leaving Smothers as a singles competitor.

=== World Wrestling Federation (1992–1993) ===
In 1992, Steve came to the World Wrestling Federation as "Lance Cassidy" under a babyface cowboy gimmick. He made his TV debut on the October 10, 1992 episode of Superstars, beating Tom Stone. The run proved to be short, as after only a few TV appearances and some house show victories over Skinner, Repo Man and Terry Taylor, he left the WWF in January 1993.

=== Smoky Mountain Wrestling (1993–1995) ===
In 1993, he started to work for Jim Cornette's Smoky Mountain Wrestling. He worked in Smoky Mountain for two years and mainly worked in tag team competition with his brother Scott. In his last year with Smoky he was in a feud with Buddy Landel for the SMW Heavyweight Championship.

=== World Championship Wrestling (1995–2000) ===
On April 25, 1995, Armstrong returned to work for WCW and wrestled Craig Pittman at a WCW Saturday Night episode. In July he began teaming with his brother Scott as The James Boys. At the July 10 taping of WCW Pro, WCW World Tag Team Champions Bunkhouse Buck and Dick Slater defeated the duo in the debut match. A month later on the August 5 edition they fell to Arn Anderson and Ric Flair. On August 22 they faced Men at Work but were again unsuccessful. Steve made his return to PPV when he appeared at World War 3 on November 26, 1995, when he competed in the three-ring battle royal.

Although back as a performer in WCW, he was mainly used as a jobber working with his brother Scott as The Armstrongs or James Brothers on Saturday Night, WorldWide and on rare occasions on Monday Nitro. On the February 17 edition of WCW Saturday Night they again fell to Men at Work. In June 1996 they were defeated by Public Enemy, and on the July 1 edition they were defeated again by Arn Anderson and Ric Flair. On the July 28, 1996 edition of WCW Worldwide they fell to Lord Steven Regal and Squire Dave Taylor. On the August 22 taping of WCW Pro, The Armstrong Brothers would finally gain their first WCW victory when they defeated Bill Payne and Rick Thames. They would go on to face The Amazing French Canadians and The Faces of Fear during the remainder of 1996.

The Armstrong Brothers would continue teaming in 1997 and faced The Amazing French Canadians and The Steiner Brothers. On the April 13 edition of WCW Worldwide they defeated The Southern Posse. After this they moved on to a brief series of matches with Harlem Heat, and in May 1997 defeated the new duo of Jim Powers and Bobby Walker, the latter put together by Teddy Long. After this they were winless for the rest of 1997 in matches with Mortis and Wrath, as well as The Public Enemy. Their pairing continued into 1998 but again saw little success. They were winless against High Voltage in multiple encounters. On the September 13 pay-per-view Fall Brawl '98 they were involved in an angle when WCW Worldwide announcer Mike Tenay attempted to interview them, only to be interrupted by Ernest Miller who then attacked both brothers. Thirteen days later they would defeat The Power Company on WCW Saturday Night. On November 30, 1998, the duo enjoyed the biggest victory of their WCW tenure when they upset Raven and Kanyon on WCW Monday Nitro.

Success continued for The Armstrong Brothers in 1999. On January 6, they upset Alex Wright and Disco Inferno in Mobile, Alabama. On the January 9 edition of WCW Saturday Night they defeated Nick Dinsmore and Mike Sullivan. The winning streak was stopped in April on WCW Saturday Night when they were defeated by Disorderly Conduct. On April 27, at a television taping in Bismarck, North Dakota they faced the NWO for the first time and defeated Vincent and Stevie Ray. On April 29, on WCW Monday Nitro the team faced Raven in a handicap match and were victorious. Scott's teaming with Steve finally came to an end on March 1, 2000, when The James Brothers faced WCW World Tag-Team Champions Big Vito and Johnny The Bull at a WCW Saturday Night taping.

On March 29, 2000, Steve made his last televised appearance for the promotion as he lost to Hugh Morrus on Saturday Night.

=== Late career (2000–2015) ===
After his run with WCW, he made a few appearances for the resurrected Continental Championship Wrestling from 2002 to 2005.

In August 2002 he worked under The Bullet mask for TNA Wrestling, having a match with Jeff Jarrett.

In October 2005 he had match with Elix Skipper for the NWA Wrestle Birmingham in the Boutwell Memorial Auditorium.

In December 2008 he had a tag team match alongside his father against Aaron James and Michael Patrick for the Great American Wrestling Federation.

Armstrong wrestled his last match in February 2015.

== Championships and accomplishments ==
- Championship Wrestling from Florida
  - NWA Florida Bahamian Championship (1 time)
  - NWA Florida Tag Team Championship (1 time) - with Tracy Smothers
- Global Championship Wrestling
  - GCW Tag Team Championship (1 time) - with Bob Armstrong
- Southeastern Championship Wrestling
  - NWA Southeastern Tag Team Championship (8 times) - with Johnny Rich (4 times), Tracy Smothers (2 times), Tommy Rich (1 time), and Bob Armstrong (1 time)
- Ohio Valley Wrestling
  - OVW Southern Tag Team Championship (1 time) - with Tracy Smothers
- World Championship Wrestling
  - WCW United States Tag Team Championship (1 time) - with Tracy Smothers
