= CWF Heavyweight Championship =

Professional wrestling championship

NWA Southeast Continental Heavyweight Championship

Details
- Promotion: Southeastern Championship Wrestling
- Date established: May 21, 1984
- Date retired: December 1989

Other name(s)
- CWF Heavyweight Championship
Statistics
- First champion(s): Ron Fuller
- Final champion(s): Tom Prichard
- Most reigns: Bob Armstrong (5 reigns)
- Shortest reign: Boomer H. Lynch (0 days)

The NWA Continental Heavyweight Championship was a major title in the National Wrestling Alliance's Alabama territory called Southeastern Championship Wrestling. It existed from 1984 until 1988 when SECW became the Continental Wrestling Federation. The title continued on as the CWF Heavyweight Championship from 1988 until 1989 when the CWF closed.

Key
No.	Overall reign number
Reign	Reign number for the specific champion
Days	Number of days held

No.	Champion	Championship change			Reign statistics		Notes	Ref.
No.	Champion	Date	Event	Location	Reign	Days	Notes	Ref.
1	Ron Fuller	May 21, 1984	House show	Birmingham, Alabama	1	63	Defeated Michael Hayes	
2	Bob Armstrong	July 23, 1984	House show	Birmingham, Alabama	1	(Note: The exact date that the championship was won and lost is unknown, which means that the title reign lasted between 1 day and 29 days.)		
3	Mr. Wrestling II	August 1984	House show	N/A	1	(Note: The exact date the championship was won and lost is unknown, which means that the title reign lasted between −1,003 and −974 days.)		
4	Bob Armstrong	November 1984	House show	N/A	2	(Note: The exact date that the championship was won and lost is unknown, which means that the title reign lasted between −943 and −913 days.)		
5	Boomer H. Lynch	May 1985	House show	N/A	1	0		
6	Bob Armstrong	May 1985	House show	N/A	3	(Note: The exact date that the championship was won and lost is unknown, which means that the title reign lasted between 1 day and 69 days.)	Title returned because Lynch was not the scheduled opponent.	
7	The Flame	June 17, 1985	House show	Birmingham, Alabama	1	(Note: The exact date that the championship was won and lost is unknown, which means that the title reign lasted between 1 day and 68 days.)		
8	Bob Armstrong	June 24, 1985 NLT	House show	Dothan, Alabama	4	(Note: The exact date that the championship was won and lost is unknown, which means that the title reign lasted between 1 day and 67 days.)		
9	The Flame	July 9, 1985	House show	Mobile, Alabama	2	(Note: The exact date that the championship was won and lost is unknown, which means that the title reign lasted between 1 day and 29 days.)		
10	Lord Humongous	July 1985	House show	N/A	1	(Note: The exact date that the championship was won and lost is unknown, which means that the title reign lasted between 1 day and 29 days.)		
11	The Flame	July 29, 1985	House show	Birmingham, Alabama	3	4		
12	Tommy Rich	August 2, 1985	House show	Birmingham, Alabama	1	52		
13	The Flame	September 23, 1985	House show	Birmingham, Alabama	4	70		
14	Roberto Soto	December 2, 1985	House show	Birmingham, Alabama	1	21		
15	Robert Fuller	December 23, 1985	House show	Birmingham, Alabama	1	81		
16	Brad Armstrong	March 14, 1986	House show	Mobile, Alabama	1	(Note: The exact date the championship was lost is uncertain, which means that the championship reign lasted between 1 day and 58 days.)		
17	Robert Fuller	1986	House show	N/A	2	(Note: The exact date the championship was won is uncertain, which means that the championship reign lasted between 1 day and 58 days.)	Title returned when Armstrong is injured	
18	Jerry Stubbs	May 12, 1986	House show	Mobile, Alabama	1	42		
19	Brad Armstrong	June 23, 1986	House show	Birmingham, Alabama	2	21		
20	Jerry Stubbs	July 14, 1986	House show	Birmingham, Alabama	2	56		
21	Brad Armstrong	September 8, 1986	House show	Birmingham, Alabama	3	4		
22	Kevin Sullivan	September 11, 1986	House show	Birmingham, Alabama	1	88		
23	The Bullet	December 8, 1986	House show	Birmingham, Alabama	5	7	Bob Armstrong wearing a mask	
24	Kevin Sullivan	December 15, 1986	House show	Birmingham, Alabama	2	51		
25	Ron Fuller	February 4, 1987	House show	Houston, Texas	2	24		
26	Buddy Landell	February 28, 1987	House show	Chattanooga, Tennessee	1	58		
27	Wendell Cooley	April 27, 1987	House show	Birmingham, Alabama	1	(Note: The exact date that Cooley retired is uncertain, which means that his reign lasted between 157 and 159 days.)		
	vacant	October 1987	N/A	N/A			Cooley vacated due to a knee injury.	
28	Dutch Mantel	October 30, 1987	House show	Knoxville, Tennessee	1	(Note: The exact date that the CCW became the CWF is uncertain, which means that his reign lasted between 63 and 339 days.)	Defeated Wendell Cooley.	
—		April 1988	—	—			CCW changed its name to the CWF on April 30, 1988. Mantel turned the championship belt over to general manager Jack Curtis on May 7, 1988 episode of CWF.	
CWF Heavyweight Championship
29	Tom Prichard	October 3, 1988	House show	Birmingham, Alabama	1	186	Defeated Tony Anthony in tournament final.	
30	Wendell Cooley	April 7, 1989	House show	Knoxville, Tennessee	1	77		
31	Tom Prichard	June 23, 1989	House show	Knoxville, Tennessee	2	149		
32	Dennis Condrey	July 22, 1989	House show	Dothan, Alabama	1	137		
33	Tom Prichard	December 6, 1989	House show	N/A	3	(Note: The exact date that the CWF ceased to operate is uncertain, which means that the championship reign lasted between 1 day and 25 days.)		
—	Deactivated	December 1989	—	—	—	—	The CWF closed.	

== See also ==
- National Wrestling Alliance
- Southeast Championship Wrestling
