= Jerry Stubbs =

American professional wrestler (born 1951)

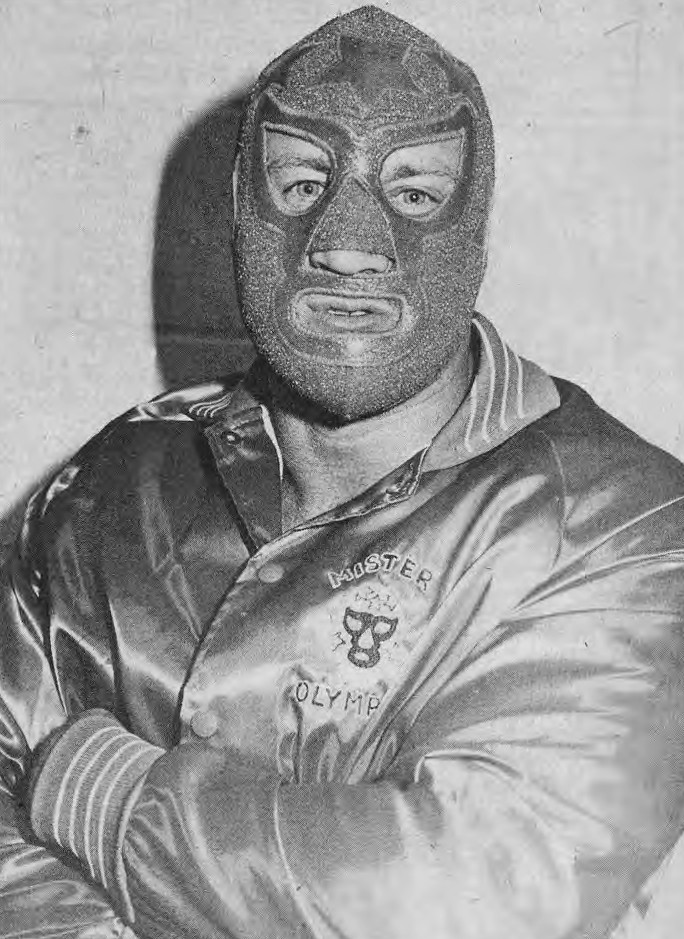
- Stubbs as Mr. Olympia, circa 1985

Personal information
- Born: September 13, 1952 (age 74) Georgia, U.S.

Professional wrestling career
- Ring name(s): A Sheik; Jerry Stubbs; The Matador; Mr. Olympia; Olympian; Mr. Perfect "Mr. Perfect" Jerry Stubbs
- Billed height: 1.86 m (6 ft 1 in)
- Billed weight: 112 kg (247 lb; 17 st 9 lb)
- Trained by: Buddy Fuller; Mr. Wrestling II; Rocky Johnson
- Debut: 1970
- Retired: 1996

Jerry Stubbs (born September 13, 1952) is an American retired professional wrestler. Stubbs wrestled as Mr. Olympia in Bill Watts's Mid-South wrestling area (Louisiana, Mississippi, Texas) and as the villainous Jerry "Mr. Perfect" Stubbs in Southeast/Continental wrestling promotions. Stubbs won multiple versions of the areas' singles and tag team titles as a member of the Stud Stable.

== Professional wrestling career ==
In the spring of 1976, Stubbs began wrestling matches for Georgia Championship Wrestling. In one match he put over Bob Backlund in the opening match on April 2 of that year at the Atlanta City Auditorium. Stubbs also wrestled such notables as Ricky Steamboat, Dean Ho, and Rick Martel that year in Georgia with modest success.

In 1977 and 1978, Stubbs continued spending his Georgia time helping put over Stan Hansen, "Dirty" Dick Slater, Randy Savage, and Abdullah the Butcher. Also, in 1978, Stubbs began taking more matches in the Mid-Atlantic territory. Although Stubbs won most his matches for Mid-Atlantic, they were usually against lower card wrestlers, such as Bill White, Bob Marcus, and Frank Monte.

In 1980–81 he was back in the Southeast/Continental area again this time wrestling as the masked Matador and winning the NWA Southeastern Continental Tag Team Championship with Mike Stallings. He also won the NWA World Junior Heavyweight Championship from Les Thornton in January 1981. Mid-year he wrestled as the masked Olympian and won the NWA Southeastern Heavyweight Championship.

Stubbs then returned to the Mid-South promotion in 1982 and began wrestling there as Mr. Olympia. He became a baby face and the regular tag team partner of the Junkyard Dog. Olympia and JYD won the area’s tag team title by defeating The Wild Samoans (Afa and Sika) in May 1982. The tandem lost the title to a team known as "The Rat Pack" (Ted DiBiase and Matt Borne) in late October 1982.where ether JYD or DiBiase would leave the Mid South territory Olympia turned on JYD and joined DiBiase as a heel to win the Mid-South tag team title from Mr. Wrestling II and Tiger Conway Jr. in April 83 in Shreveport, Louisiana.

In 1984 he teamed regularly with Arn Anderson as Super Olympia who was there for seasoning before moving to Georgia Championship Wrestling. Together they won the area’s tag team title in a tournament on January 15, 1984 wrestling as Mr. Olympia and Super Olympia. They were managed by Sonny King at the time. Stubbs and Anderson also joined and wrestled for the Stud Stable as themselves. Soon Anderson and Stubbs had a falling out leading to a series of mask versus mask matches. A loss in the first match caused Mr Olympia to unmask revealing himself to be Stubbs. In the next match Super Olympia lost his mask to reveal Anderson, a third match ended in a draw. The pair would make their peace and wrestle as a pair again this time wearing trademark matching Panama hats.

In 1986, Stubbs won the area’s most prestigious title, the new Continental Championship. He traded the title back and forth with Brad Armstrong throughout much of the year leading to a hot feud with all of the Armstrong brothers during this time. During 1986, Stubbs lost a Mask vs Mask match with "The Bullet" Bob Armstrong. He also teamed regularly with Tony Anthony (later the Dirty White Boy). Together they defeated The Nightmares (Danny Davis and Ken Wayne) on February 23, 1987. They lost and regained the straps against Robert Fuller and Jimmy Golden, members of the Stud Stable. Fuller and Golden turned heel again immediately following the title win, and Stubbs resumed his Mr. Olympia persona and feuded with Anthony.

Also, in 1986 and 1987, Stubbs spent time overseas wrestling for All Japan. There he again donned the mask as Mr. Olympia. He teamed with the AWA's Brad Rheingans and they won a number of matches together. Another regular partner was Paul Diamond. Stubbs also wrestled occasionally under the name "A Sheik" during that time (not to be confused with The Sheik). Curt Hennig and Stubbs would meet in Japan where Stubbs explained the "Mr. Perfect" gimmick to Hennig and gave his OK for Hennig using the gimmick in the WWF.

He retired from wrestling in 1996.

== Championships and accomplishments ==
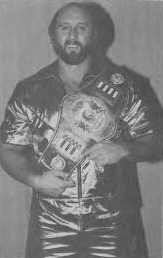
Stubbs with the NWA Southeastern Heavyweight Championship

- NWA Tri-State / Mid-South Wrestling Association
  - NWA Louisiana Heavyweight Championship (1 time)
  - NWA Mississippi Heavyweight Championship (3 times)
  - Mid-South Tag Team Championship (2 times) – with Junkyard Dog (1) and Ted DiBiase (1)
- Southeastern Championship Wrestling / Continental Championship Wrestling / Continental Wrestling Federation
  - NWA Continental Championship (2 times
  - CWF Tag Team Championship (2 times) – with Tony Anthony
  - NWA Alabama Heavyweight Championship (4 times)
  - NWA Continental Tag Team Championship (6 times) – with Tony Anthony
  - NWA Southeastern Heavyweight Championship (Northern Division) (5 times)
  - NWA Southeastern Tag Team Championship (4 times) – with Mike Stallings (1), Arn Anderson (3)
  - NWA Southeastern Television Championship (1 time)
  - NWA Southeastern United States Junior Heavyweight Championship (4 times)
  - NWA World Junior Heavyweight Championship (1 time)
- World Wrestling Organization
  - WWO United States Heavyweight Championship (1 time)
