= Emory Hale =

American professional wrestler (1969–2006)

Emery Hale

Personal information
- Born: December 13, 1969 St. Petersburg, Florida, U.S.
- Died: January 28, 2006 (aged 36)

Professional wrestling career
- Ring name(s): Emery Hale; Big Hail; Lord Humongous; The Machine; Hail
- Billed height: 6 ft 9 in (2.06 m)
- Billed weight: 350 lb (160 kg)
- Debut: 1998
- Retired: 2003

Emery Hale (December 13, 1969 – January 28, 2006) was an American professional wrestler, best known for his two-year run in World Championship Wrestling (WCW).

== Early life ==
Emery Hale was born on December 13, 1969. Early in life, Hale played baseball, and at one point had a tryout with the Baltimore Orioles.

== Professional wrestling career ==
Weighing in at 350 pounds and standing in at 6' 9", Hale made his professional wrestling debut in 1998 for the World Wrestling Alliance, occasionally teaming up with Test in a couple of matches. He also wrestled for Music City Wrestling as Lord Humongous, and used a leaping piledriver as a finisher.

In late 1998, Jimmy Hart brought Hale to World Championship Wrestling (WCW), grooming him as the next big opponent for Hulk Hogan. He mainly wrestled on WCW Monday Nitro and WCW Saturday Night, losing to bigger stars like Lex Luger, Barry Windham and Booker T. On February 2, 2000, he appeared on WCW Thunder as the Machine, losing to Diamond Dallas Page.

On September 8, 2001, he lost to Abdullah the Butcher by disqualification for World Wrestling Council in Puerto Rico. Hale also worked in many projects involving Hart and Hogan. In 2001, he signed with the X Wrestling Federation, where, like his time in WCW, was managed by Hart and was groomed to be the top heel for the promotion. After leaving XWF, he went on to wrestle on the independent circuit as Lord Humongus. He would retire after developing pneumonia stemming from a kidney transplant in 2003.

== Illness and death ==
In 2003, Hale received a kidney transplant, but eventually developed pneumonia and was hospitalized in the ICU of Tampa General Hospital. On January 28, 2006, Hale died of kidney failure at the age of 36.

== See also ==
- List of premature professional wrestling deaths
