= Tony Anthony =

American professional wrestler (born 1960)

Personal information
- Born: Darrell W. Anthony; April 12, 1960 (age 66) Knoxville, Tennessee, U.S.
- Spouse: Bernice Anthony

Professional wrestling career
- Ring name(s): American Eagle II; Dirty White Boy; Grappler #2; The Invader; Mighty Yankee; T. L. Hopper; Tony Anthony; Uncle Cletus
- Billed height: 5 ft 10 in (178 cm)
- Billed weight: 235 lb (107 kg)
- Billed from: Bucksnort, Tennessee
- Trained by: Steve Keirn; Ron Wright
- Debut: October 1980
- Retired: 2006

Darrell W. Anthony (born April 12, 1960) is an American retired professional wrestler, also known by his ring name Dirty White Boy. He wrestled in NWA territories in the Southeastern United States. He was most active throughout the 1980s and 1990s in the Tennessee-based United States Wrestling Association (USWA) and Smoky Mountain Wrestling (SMW), and had two short stints with the World Wrestling Federation (WWF) under the ring names of T. L. Hopper and Uncle Cletus.

== Professional wrestling career ==
=== Early career (1980–1988) ===
Trained by Steve Keirn and Ron Wright, Anthony worked as a jobber in Mid-Atlantic Championship Wrestling in 1981 and 1982. He won his first major title teaming with Len Denton as "The Grapplers" in the AWA. They defeated The Fabulous Ones (Keirn and Stan Lane) to win the AWA Southern Tag Team Championship on August 8, 1983. After losing the title, The Grapplers continued to team elsewhere, winning the NWA Central States Tag Team Championship twice in 1984.

After The Grapplers disbanded, Anthony continued to wrestle on the independent circuit, splitting his time between singles competition and tag team action. He teamed with Jerry Stubbs in Continental Championship Wrestling to win the NWA Continental Tag Team Championship four times before the promotion closed. After it became the Continental Wrestling Federation, Anthony and Stubbs won the tag team title twice more. As a singles wrestler, Anthony won the NWA Alabama Heavyweight Championship on four occasions. He beat Wendell Cooley to begin both of his first two reigns, Bob Armstrong to begin his third and Tom Prichard for his fourth. His last reign ended when the title was retired in 1988.

=== United States Wrestling Association (1989–1992) ===
In 1989, Anthony defeated Dustin Rhodes in a United States Wrestling Association (USWA) tournament final to become the first USWA Southern Heavyweight champion. The following year, he won the USWA Tag Team Championship on three occasions, once with Tom Burton and twice with Doug Gilbert.

=== Smoky Mountain Wrestling (1992–1995) ===
Anthony competed primarily as a singles wrestler in Smoky Mountain Wrestling (SMW). He was quickly pushed as a main event wrestler, and won the SMW Heavyweight Championship from Brian Lee on August 8, 1992. He dropped the title to Tracy Smothers in April 1993.

In June 1993, Anthony (under his masked Mighty Yankee gimmick) won the SMW Beat the Champ Television Championship. While holding this title, he defeated Brian Lee to regain the Heavyweight Championship. He was involved in an angle in which he was forced to vacate the Television Championship on August 16, after a series of defenses. The rules stipulated that any wrestler who successfully defended the title five times would be awarded $5,000, but be forced to vacate it. Anthony regained the title by beating Robert Gibson on September 13. He won his final SMW Heavyweight Championship on July 5, 1994, by defeating Jake Roberts. He held the title for over six months before losing it to Jerry Lawler on January 28, 1995. Anthony's performance in 1994 earned him his highest ever ranking (No. 25) in the annual PWI 500.

Anthony won his final title in SMW on July 6, 1995, teaming with Tracy Smothers (as the Thugs) to defeat The Dynamic Duo (Al Snow and Unabom) for the SMW Tag Team Championship.

=== World Wrestling Federation (1996–1997) ===
In 1996, Anthony joined the World Wrestling Federation (WWF). He was one of a series of "jobbers with gimmicks" brought into the WWF in 1996 to help elevate the company's stars, alongside Alex "The Pug" Pourteau, Freddie Joe Floyd, the Goon, and Salvatore Sincere. He was given the gimmick of "T. L. Hopper", a wrestling plumber. After a series of vignettes showing Hopper at work, he debuted wearing low hanging jeans and a stained undershirt. He would carry his plunger (named "Betsy") to the ring with him, and celebrate his victories by sticking it in his opponent's face. His biggest win was a "home improvement" match, where he defeated Duke "The Dumpster" Droese.

Although he did not wrestle on any WWF pay-per-views, he made an appearance during the "Bikini Beach Blast-Off" segment, on the Free For All show immediately preceding SummerSlam 1996. Based on his experience as a plumber, Hopper was chosen to investigate a brown object resembling feces on the bottom of the swimming pool which turned out to be a sausage. The segment parodied a scene in the movie Caddyshack. He continued wrestling in lower cards matches mainly in house shows until June 1997.

After taking a brief hiatus, he returned to the WWF in September 1997 as Uncle Cletus, coming from the audience to help the heel tag team of The Godwinns (Henry and Phineas Godwinn) in a match against The Headbangers. He hit Mosh in the head with a horseshoe, allowing Phineas to make the pin. He was then billed as the uncle of the Godwinns, and became the team's manager. At Badd Blood 1997, The Godwinns won the WWF Tag Team Championship, with Cletus in their corner. On October 13, Cletus interfered in another match, but his interference backfired and allowed the Legion of Doom to win the title. Following this, the Godwinns attacked Cletus, who was never seen in the WWF again.

=== Later career (1997–2006) ===
After leaving the WWF, Anthony returned to his home state of Tennessee (where he had maintained considerable fame and popularity) and wrestled for various independents around East Tennessee until retiring from active competition in 2006. In recent years, he played a prominent role in Knoxville's Tennessee Xtreme Wrestling, as its face commissioner.

== Championships and accomplishments ==
- American Wrestling Federation
  - AWF Heavyweight Championship (1 time)
- Continental Wrestling Association
  - AWA Southern Tag Team Championship (1 time) - with Len Denton
  - CWA Southwestern Heavyweight Championship (1 time)
- Memphis Wrestling Hall of Fame
  - Class of 2024
- New Dimension Wrestling
  - NDW Hardcore Championship (1 time)
- Pro Wrestling Illustrated
  - PWI ranked him #25 of the top 500 best singles wrestlers in the PWI 500 in 1994
  - PWI ranked him #299 of the 500 best singles wrestlers during the "PWI Years" in 2003
- Smoky Mountain Wrestling
  - SMW Beat the Champ Television Championship (2 times)
  - SMW Heavyweight Championship (3 times)
  - SMW Tag Team Championship (1 time) - with Tracy Smothers
  - SMW Carolina Cup Tag Team Championship (1 time) – Tracy Smothers
- Southeastern Championship Wrestling / Continental Championship Wrestling / Continental Wrestling Federation
  - CWF Tag Team Championship (2 times) - with Jerry Stubbs
  - NWA Alabama Heavyweight Championship (4 times)
  - NWA Continental Tag Team Championship (4 times) - with Jerry Stubbs
- Southwest Championship Wrestling
  - SCW Southwest Tag Team Championship (2 times) - with Len Denton
- Tennessee Mountain Wrestling
  - TMW Heavyweight Championship (2 times)
- United Atlantic Championship Wrestling
  - UACW Heavyweight Championship (1 time)
- United States Wrestling Association
  - USWA Southern Heavyweight Championship (1 time)
  - USWA World Tag Team Championship (3 times) - with Tom Burton (1) and Doug Gilbert (2)
