= NWA Alabama Heavyweight Championship =

Professional wrestling championship

- The championship belt

Details
- Promotion: None
- Date established: October 5, 1962
- Current champion: None

Other name
- NWA Alabama Heavyweight Championship
Statistics
- First champion: Jan Madrid
- Most reigns: Dick Dunn (8 reigns)
- Longest reign: Dick Dunn (1,067 days)
- Shortest reign: Billy Boy Hines (Less than one day)

The NWA Alabama Heavyweight Championship was created in October, 1962. Since its creation, the championship has been defended in a number of NWA territories throughout the decades.

Initially, the title was a part of Gulf Coast Championship Wrestling (GCCW) and later Southeastern Championship Wrestling (SECW), which became Continental Championship Wrestling (CCW) in 1985. It is unclear exactly when the championship moved to SCW/CCW, however it was sometime between December 1977 and November 1980. The title stayed there until CCW left the NWA to join the American Wrestling Association (AWA) in 1988.

The championship was then shortly picked up by Alabama Pro Wrestling (APW - now NWA Xtreme) as its major title in May 2001. The title then became again inactive in November 2002, when APW created its own Heavyweight Championship.

== Title history ==
Key
No.	Overall reign number
Reign	Reign number for the specific champion
Days	Number of days held

No.	Champion	Championship change			Reign statistics		Notes	Ref.
No.	Champion	Date	Event	Location	Reign	Days	Notes	Ref.
1	Jan Madrid	October 5, 1962	GCCW show	Dothan, Alabama	1	70	Defeated Don Field in a tournament final to become the first champion.	
2	Don Field	December 14, 1962	GCCW show	Dothan, Alabama	1	232		
—	Vacated	August 3, 1963	—	—	—	—	Title vacated when Field is in a career-ending automobile accident.	
3	Ken Lucas	May 14, 1969	GCCW show	Mobile, Alabama	1	63	Defeated Dick Steinborn in a tournament final to win the vacant title.	
4	Black Hand	July 16, 1969	GCCW show	Mobile, Alabama	1	7		
5	Ken Lucas	July 23, 1969	GCCW show	Mobile, Alabama	2	35		
6	Rocket Monroe	August 27, 1969	GCCW show	Mobile, Alabama	1	28		
7	Bob Boyer	September 24, 1969	GCCW show	Mobile, Alabama	1	49		
8	Billy Boy Hines	November 12, 1969	GCCW show	Mobile, Alabama	1	9		
—	Vacated	November 21, 1969	—	—	—	—		
9	Billy Boy Hines	November 21, 1969	GCCW show	Dothan, Alabama	2	0	Title was awarded.	
10	Rocket Monroe	November 21, 1969	GCCW show	Dothan, Alabama	2	42		
11	Dick Dunn	January 2, 1970	GCCW show	Dothan, Alabama	1	N/A		
Championship history is unrecorded from January 2, 1970 to December 1972.
12	The Wrestling Pro	December 1972	GCCW show	Dothan, Alabama	1	N/A		
13	Rick Gibson	December 29, 1972	GCCW show	Dothan, Alabama	1	14		
14	The Wrestling Pro	January 12, 1973	GCCW show	Dothan, Alabama	2	7		
15		January 19, 1973	GCCW show	Dothan, Alabama	3	148		
16	Eddie Sullivan	June 16, 1973	GCCW show	New Brocton, Alabama	1	62		
17	Dick Dunn	August 17, 1973	GCCW show	Dothan, Alabama	2	98		
18	Duke Miller	November 23, 1973	GCCW show	Dothan, Alabama	1	42		
19	Dick Dunn	January 4, 1974	GCCW show	Dothan, Alabama	3	21		
20	The Wrestling Pro	January 25, 1974	GCCW show	Dothan, Alabama	3	71		
21		April 6, 1974	GCCW show	New Brocton, Alabama	4	182		
22	Duke Miller	October 5, 1974	SECW show	New Brocton, Alabama	2	14		
23		October 19, 1974	SECW show	New Brocton, Alabama	5	49		
24	Randy Tyler	December 7, 1974	SECW show	Dothan, Alabama	1	77		
25	Dick Dunn	February 22, 1975	SECW show	New Brocton, Alabama	4	34		
26	Rip Tyler	March 28, 1975	SECW show	Dothan, Alabama	1	14		
27	Dick Dunn	April 11, 1975	SECW show	Dothan, Alabama	5	28		
28	J.C. Dykes	May 9, 1975	SECW show	Dothan, Alabama	1	21		
29	Dick Dunn	May 30, 1975	SECW show	Dothan, Alabama	6	21	Defeated The Mighty Yankee.	
30	Don Duffy	June 20, 1975	SECW show	Dothan, Alabama	1	56		
31	Dick Dunn	August 15, 1975	SECW show	Dothan, Alabama	7	41		
32	Bill Malone	September 25, 1975	SECW show	New Brocton, Alabama	1	33		
33	Ken Lucas	October 28, 1975	SECW show	Mobile, Alabama	6	46		
34	Duke Miller	December 13, 1975	SECW show	New Brocton, Alabama	3	108		
35	Rick Gibson	March 30, 1976	SECW show	Mobile, Alabama	2	N/A		
—	Vacated	N/A	—	—	—	—	Title vacated when Gibson leaves SECW.	
36	Greg Peterson	August 20, 1976	SECW show	N/A	1	63	Title was awarded.	
37	The Wrestling Pro	October 22, 1976	SECW show	Ozark, Alabama	4	14		
38	Greg Peterson	November 5, 1976	SCW show	Dothan, Alabama	2	7		
39	The Wrestling Pro	November 12, 1976	SECW show	Dothan, Alabama	5	7		
40	Bob Kelly	November 19, 1976	SECW show	Dothan, Alabama	1	4		
41	The Wrestling Pro	November 23, 1976	SECW show	Mobile, Alabama	6	3		
42	Dick Dunn	November 26, 1976	SECW show	Dothan, Alabama	8	7		
43	Rip Tyler	December 3, 1976	SECW show	Dothan, Alabama	2	98		
44	Sonny King	March 11, 1977	SECW show	Dothan, Alabama	1	92		
45	The Blue Yankee	June 11, 1977	SECW show	New Brocton, Alabama	1	34		
46	Johnny Eagles	July 15, 1977	SECW show	Dothan, Alabama	1	141		
47	Billy Spears	December 3, 1977	SECW show	New Brocton, Alabama	1	6		
48	Ricky Fields	December 9, 1977	SECW show	Dothan, Alabama	1	N/A		
Championship history is unrecorded from December 9, 1977 to 1978.
49	Billy Spears	1978	SECW show	N/A	2	N/A		
50	Ricky Fields	April 1978	SECW show	N/A	2	N/A		
Championship history is unrecorded from April 1978 to November 1980.
51	Bob Armstrong	November 1980	SECW show	N/A	1	N/A	Won a tournament.	
Championship history is unrecorded from November 1980 to 1981.
52	Rufus R. Jones	N/A	SECW show	N/A	1	N/A		
Championship history is unrecorded from 1981 to 1981.
53	Ken Lucas	1981	SECW show	N/A	7	N/A		
Championship history is unrecorded from 1981 to March 9, 1981.
54	Bob Armstrong	March 9, 1981	SECW show	Birmingham, Alabama	2	N/A	Defeated Mr. Saito.	
55	Mr. Saito	March 1981	SECW show	N/A	1	N/A		
Championship history is unrecorded from March 1981 to 1981.
56	Dennis Condrey	1981	SECW show	N/A	1	N/A		
57	Bob Armstrong	1981	SECW show	N/A	3	N/A		
58	Dennis Condrey	1981	SECW show	N/A	2	N/A		
59	Jacques Rougeau	1981	SECW show	N/A	1	N/A		
60	Jerry Stubbs	1981	SECW show	N/A	1	N/A		
61	George Wells	1981	SECW show	N/A	1	N/A		
62	Jimmy Golden	1981	SECW show	N/A	1	N/A		
63	Ray Candy	August 1981	SECW show	N/A	1	N/A		
64	Mr. Saito	N/A	SECW show	N/A	2	N/A		
65	Ron Fuller	N/A	SECW show	N/A	1	N/A		
Championship history is unrecorded from August 1981 to January 1982.
66	Jimmy Golden	January 1982	SECW show	N/A	2	N/A		
Championship history is unrecorded from January 1982 to April 11, 1982.
67	Terry Gordy	April 11, 1982	SECW show	N/A	1	N/A		
68	Jos LeDuc	May 1982	SECW show	N/A	1	N/A		
69	Austin Idol	1982	SECW show	N/A	1	N/A		
70	Wayne Farris	September 11, 1982	SECW show	Dothan, Alabama	1	N/A		
71	Mr. Olympia	January 1983	SECW show	N/A	2	N/A		
72	Norman Frederick Charles	March 1983	SECW show	N/A	1	N/A		
73	Tom Jones	March 1983	SECW show	N/A	1	N/A		
74	The Flame	March 1983	SECW show	N/A	1	N/A		
75	Rick Gibson	May 1983	SECW show	N/A	3	N/A		
76	Rick Harris	July 1983	SECW show	N/A	1	N/A		
77	Buck Robley	July 1983	SECW show	N/A	1	N/A		
78	Rick Harris	July 1983	SECW show	N/A	2	N/A		
79	Mr. Olympia / Jerry Stubbs	August 1983	SECW show	N/A	3	N/A	Unmasked after losing a mask vs. mask match to Super Olympia.	
80	Charlie Cook	January 9, 1984	SECW show	Birmingham, Alabama	1	91		
81	Vic Rain	April 9, 1984	SECW show	Birmingham, Alabama	1	49		
82	Rick McGraw	May 28, 1984	SECW show	Birmingham, Alabama	1	77		
83	Boris Zhukov	August 13, 1984	SECW show	Birmingham, Alabama	1	N/A		
84	Porkchop Cash	September 1984	SECW show	N/A	1	N/A		
85	Lord Humongous	November 28, 1984	SECW show	Birmingham, Alabama	1	N/A		
86	Johnny Rich	1985	SECW show	N/A	1	N/A		
87	Lord Humongous	1985	SECW show	N/A	2	N/A		
88	Austin Idol	March 4, 1985	SECW show	N/A	2	34		
89	Lord Humongous	April 7, 1985	SECW show	Dothan, Alabama	3	71		
90	Ron Fuller	June 17, 1985	CCW show	N/A	2	N/A		
91	Bob Armstrong	July 1985	CCW show	N/A	4	N/A		
—	Vacated	1985	—	—	—	—	Title vacated after Armstrong is injured.	
92	Roberto Soto	September 20, 1985	CCW show	Mobile, Alabama	1	157	Defeated The Flame in a tournament final to win the vacant title.	
93	Jerry Stubbs	February 24, 1986	CCW show	Birmingham, Alabama	4	N/A		
—	Vacated	1986	—	—	—	—		
94	Wendell Cooley	September 15, 1986	CCW show	Birmingham, Alabama	1	56	Defeated Jerry Stubbs in a tournament final to win the vacant title.	
95	Tony Anthony	November 10, 1986	CCW show	Birmingham, Alabama	1	18		
96	Wendell Cooley	November 28, 1986	CCW show	Oxford, Alabama	2	N/A		
97	Tony Anthony	December 1986	CCW show	N/A	2	N/A		
98	Wendell Cooley	January 12, 1987	CCW show	Birmingham, Alabama	3	N/A		
—	Vacated	February 1987	—	—	—	—		
99	Mike Golden	April 1987	CCW show	N/A	1	N/A	Billed as champion on arrival to CCW.	
100	Mr. Wrestling II	April 26, 1987	CCW show	Birmingham, Alabama	1	49		
101	Mike Golden	June 14, 1987	CCW show	Marietta, Georgia	2	8		
102	The Bullet	June 22, 1987	CCW show	Birmingham, Alabama	5	119	Won the title in a tag team match with Scott Armstrong against Golden and Tom Prichard.	
103	Tony Anthony	October 19, 1987	CCW show	Birmingham, Alabama	3	7		
104	Tom Prichard	October 26, 1987	CCW show	Birmingham, Alabama	1	69		
105	Moondog Spot	January 3, 1988	CCW show	Birmingham, Alabama	1	N/A		
106	Ranger Ross	January 1988	CCW show	N/A	1	N/A		
107	Jonathan Boyd	January 11, 1988	CCW show	Birmingham, Alabama	1	35		
108	Tom Prichard	February 15, 1988	CCW show	Birmingham, Alabama	2	42		
109	Tony Anthony	March 28, 1988	CCW show	Birmingham, Alabama	4	N/A		
—	Deactivated	1988	—	—	—	—	Title abandoned when CCW became the CWF on April 30, 1988.	

== See also ==
- National Wrestling Alliance
- Southeastern/Continental Championship Wrestling
