= Jos LeDuc =

Canadian wrestler (1944–1999)

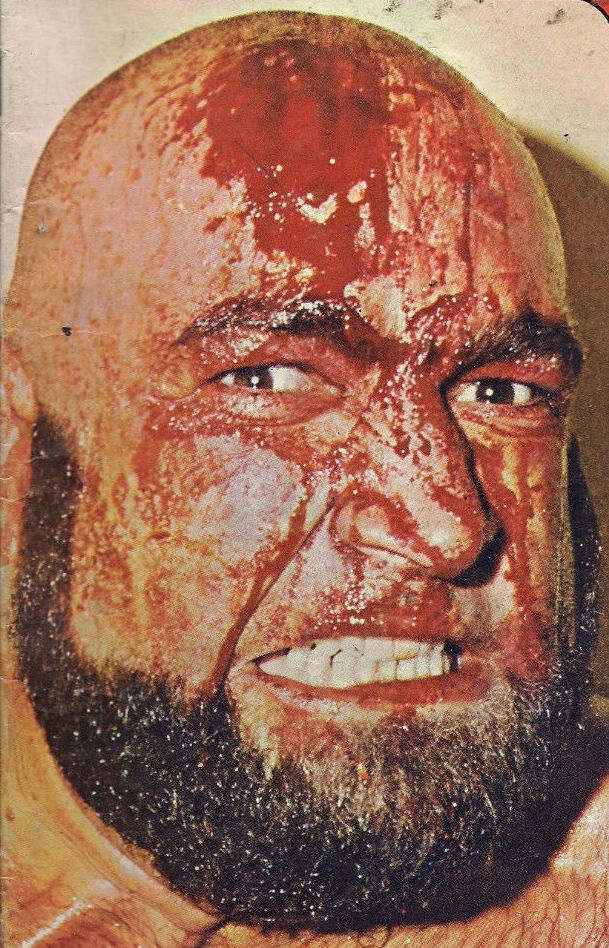
- LeDuc in the mid-1970s

Personal information
- Born: Michel Pigeon; August 31, 1944 Montreal, Quebec, Canada
- Died: May 1, 1999 (aged 54) Atlanta, Georgia, U.S.

Professional wrestling career
- Ring name(s): Butcher LeDuc; The Headbanger; Jos LeDuc
- Billed height: 6 ft 1 in (185 cm)
- Billed weight: 280 lb (127 kg)
- Billed from: Godbout, Quebec, Canada
- Trained by: Jack Britton; Stu Hart
- Debut: 1968
- Retired: 1995

Michel Pigeon (August 31, 1944 – May 1, 1999) was a Canadian professional wrestler better known by his ring name, Jos LeDuc.

Wrestling with a lumberjack gimmick, he debuted in Stampede Wrestling with his kayfabe brother, Paul LeDuc. The pair later won several titles in Montreal, where they feuded with the Rougeau wrestling family, and Florida, where they held the NWA Florida Tag Team Championship. After an injury ended Paul's career, Jos competed as a singles wrestler. He was involved in a heated feud with Dusty Rhodes. He then moved to Tennessee, where he had a rivalry with Jerry Lawler over the NWA Mid-America Southern Tag Team Championship, notably legitimately breaking Lawler's leg when he threw him over the top rope onto the announcer's desk.

LeDuc spent many years traveling between Florida and Tennessee, and he won belts in both locations as a singles wrestler and as a tag team competitor. He also spent time on wrestling tours of Japan and New Zealand. One of his biggest feuds was with manager Oliver Humperdink, whom he accused of stealing his money. This led to LeDuc winning the NWA Television Championship from one of Humperdink's wrestlers. He continued to split his time between singles and tag team wrestling, and he resumed his feud with Lawler in Tennessee. In his later career, he worked in Puerto Rico and had a brief stint in the World Wrestling Federation. Altogether, he held 32 championships (15 singles and 17 tag team) before dying of a lung infection, aged 54.

== Early life ==
Pigeon was born on August 31, 1944 at a small village near Montreal. His parents separated at a young age, causing Pigeon to live in orphanages and with his relatives and mother.

== Professional wrestling career ==
=== Early career (1968–1973) ===
Prior to entering professional wrestling, Pigeon gained combat sport experience by studying judo. He worked for the Quebec Provincial Police until the mid-1960s, when he decided to become a wrestler. His friend Paul LeDuc had competed as a professional wrestler in Mexico and wanted a tag team partner. He convinced Pigeon to train as a wrestler, and Pigeon trained under Stu Hart in Calgary, Alberta.

Along with Paul, Pigeon began wrestling in Hart's Stampede Wrestling in 1968 under the ring name Jos LeDuc, Paul's tag team partner and kayfabe brother. The LeDucs' gimmick was inspired by "Yukon" Eric Holmback, a professional wrestler who had died three years earlier. They portrayed stereotypical Canadian lumberjacks and wore flannel shirts to the ring. They received a push from the promoters and won the Stampede International Tag Team Championship in 1969, but they lost the belts later that year. They moved to Toronto's Maple Leaf Wrestling, Ohio and Texas. Jos himself continued as a singles competitor in Toronto, Los Angeles, Pittsburgh, World Wide Wrestling Federation and Japan Wrestling Association.

After moving to the Montreal area, the LeDucs debuted in the International Wrestling Association with a scripted attack on local wrestler Johnny Rougeau. This led to a feud between the LeDucs and the Rougeaus (Johnny and his real-life brother Jacques). Jos LeDuc was booked to win the Montreal version of the International Heavyweight Championship by defeating Johnny Rougeau in 1971. The bookers also decided to give him a run with the International Tag Team Championship that year, which LeDuc won while teaming with Tony Baillargeon. While in Montreal, the LeDucs also competed for Grand Prix Wrestling and were booked in a feud with the Vachon brothers (Mad Dog and Butcher) as well as Killer Kowalski. The LeDucs had two reigns with the Grand Prix Wrestling Tag Team Championship in 1972 and 1973.

=== Southern United States (1973–1980) ===
LeDuc's next stop was in Championship Wrestling from Florida (CWF), where he resumed teaming with Paul LeDuc, this time as The Canadian Lumberjacks. They won the NWA Florida Tag Team Championship on November 23, 1973, by defeating Dusty Rhodes and Dick Slater. They defended the belts for two months before dropping them to Slater and his new partner Stan Vachon, a kayfabe brother of the Vachons from Montreal. This was the final time the LeDuc's held a title together, as Paul LeDuc sustained a legitimate injury that forced Jos to wrestle without him. Jos LeDuc also wrestled as a singles competitor in Florida, defeating Rhodes on February 5, 1974, for the NWA Florida Southern Heavyweight Championship. He dropped the title to Rhodes on March 12. LeDuc and Rhodes were placed in a heated feud at this time, and they frequently faced each other in Death matches.

LeDuc made his AWA television debut on August 2, 1975, defeating Angel Rivera. LeDuc was given wins over Buddy Wolff and Boris Breznikoff before forming a team with Larry Hennig. They first teamed on September 12, 1975, in Denver, Colorado losing to Jimmy and Johnny Valiant. LeDuc and Hennig feuded with the Valiant Brothers for several months before entering a feud with Baron Von Raschke and Mad Dog Vachon. Jos and Larry also received a few title shots against AWA tag champs Blackjack Lanza and Bobby Duncum in August 1976. Probably his most memorable accomplishment while working for the promotion was a bus-pulling stunt filmed in Minneapolis that was also used in promo videos while appearing in the Memphis and Atlanta territories, among others. LeDuc departed the AWA in September 1976.

On August 26, 1977, LeDuc teamed with Bob Armstrong to win the NWA Southeast Tag Team Championship in Tennessee. They were put over Bob Orton, Jr. and Mr. Knoxville for the belts but lost them in a rematch. While in Tennessee, LeDuc gained notoriety from a worked feud with Jerry Lawler. Wrestling as a heel, he faced Jerry Lawler, who was a favorite in the state, in many matches throughout the year. LeDuc was placed with a new partner, Jean Louie, to win the NWA Mid-America Southern Tag Team Championship in May. They faced Lawler and Jimmy Valiant on May 22 to defend the belts, but the match was declared a no contest and the title was vacated. Lawler and Valiant won the belts in a rematch the following week, but LeDuc and Louie regained them the following month. In September, LeDuc and Louie dropped the belts once again, this time to Lawler and the Mongolian Stomper.

LeDuc returned to Florida in 1978 and was given a title reign with the NWA Florida Heavyweight Championship after defeating Mr. Uganda on December 18. He held the belt for two weeks before dropping it to his old kayfabe rival Dick Slater. He was soon a champion again, as he and Thor the Viking were booked to win the NWA Florida United States Tag Team Championship on February 17, 1979, from Jack and Jerry Brisco. They dropped the belts to Killer Karl Kox and Jimmy Garvin, but LeDuc soon regained the title by teaming with Pak Song. LeDuc and Song vacated the title shortly after winning it, but LeDuc teamed with yet another partner, Don Muraco, to win the belts back later that year.

During this stint in Florida, LeDuc made a scripted turn from face to heel. Garvin claimed that LeDuc was aligned with heel manager Sonny King, but LeDuc denied the claim. Garvin then showed video footage to prove that LeDuc had secret dealings with King. LeDuc responded by attacking Garvin in front of the crowd, solidifying a heel turn for LeDuc. In a storyline several months later, LeDuc and King Curtis Iaukea attacked Buddy Rogers, a veteran then working as a face. The injuries Rogers received were said to be so severe that he was forced to retire, although, in reality, Rogers had simply moved to another wrestling promotion.

Later that year, LeDuc wrestled in Japan during a brief tour. He was successful during several matches on the tour, but his wrestling style was noticeably different from the traditional Japanese style. In the Japanese media, he was referred to as "maniacal" and "demented".

LeDuc soon returned to the Tennessee area for a push with Southeast Championship Wrestling. He won his first NWA Southeast Heavyweight Championship in a victory over Killer Karl Kox in March 1980 before losing the belt back to Kox in a rematch. In October, he regained the Southeastern Tag Team Championship while teaming with Robert Fuller. They lost the belts to Super Pro and Ron Bass, but LeDuc teamed with Armstrong again to regain the belts.

=== New Zealand (1981) ===
LeDuc travelled to New Zealand to wrestle in 1981. While there, he was booked in two title reigns. On April 23, he won the NWA New Zealand British Commonwealth Championship by defeating Steve Rickard. He dropped the belt to Mark Lewin one week later but regained it in a rematch on July 9. His second and final reign came to an end when he lost the belt to Rickard in mid-August.

=== Return to the Southern United States (1981–1984, 1986) ===
Later that year, LeDuc returned to Southeastern Championship Wrestling and was given two more tag team title reigns while teaming with Fuller. Ultimately, the team split up and vacated the title. LeDuc was then booked in singles competition, winning the Southeastern Heavyweight Championship twice more with victories over Jacques Rougeau, Jr. and Terry Gordy. He was also put over Terry Gordy to win the NWA Alabama Heavyweight Championship in May 1982, but LeDuc dropped the title that summer to Austin Idol.

In the early 1980s, LeDuc wrestled in Mid-Atlantic Championship Wrestling, where the bookers had him join Oliver Humperdink's "House of Humperdink" stable. Under Humperdink's management, LeDuc was booked to win the NWA Television Championship by defeating Jimmy Valiant in 1982. The title reign did not last long, as the belt was soon taken away because of an angle that saw LeDuc cheat in a title defense against Johnny Weaver. Eventually, the storyline had LeDuc claim that Humperdink had stolen his money, and LeDuc left the stable. This led to a worked feud between LeDuc and the members of Humperdink's stable, although the main rivalry that was portrayed was between LeDuc and Dick Slater. As part of the feud, LeDuc and Slater faced each other on April 30, 1983, in a Lumberjack match. At this time, LeDuc received a push and won the match and Slater's NWA Television Championship.

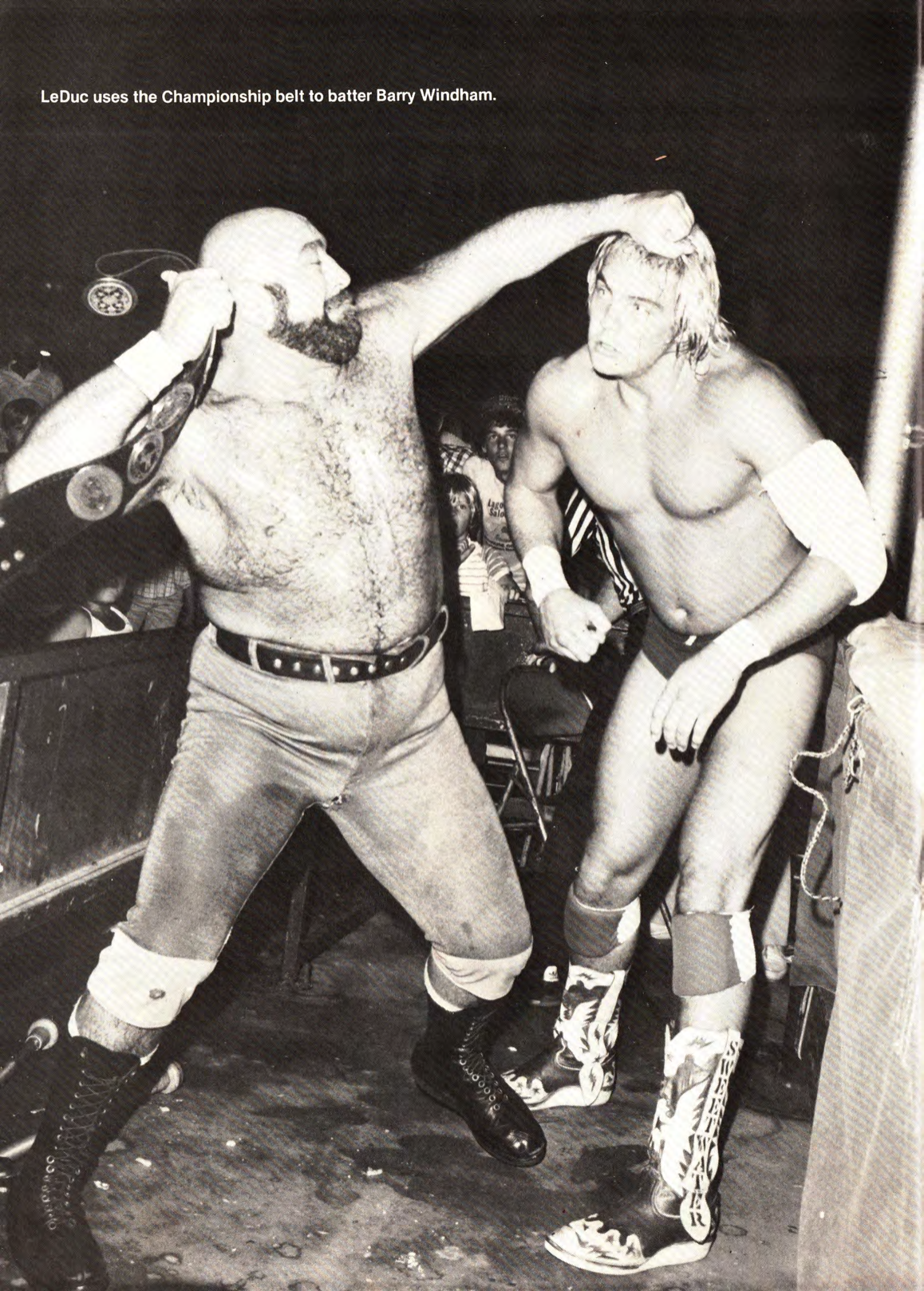
LeDuc (left) hitting Barry Windham (right) with NWA Florida Heavyweight Championship, circa 1983

LeDuc then returned to Florida, where he was kept mainly in the singles division. In October 1983, he was put over Scott McGhee to win the NWA Florida Heavyweight Championship for a second time. He dropped the belt to Barry Windham the following month. In a rematch with Windham the following night, LeDuc won the belt once again. His final reign as Florida Heavyweight Champion was short-lived, as the bookers had him drop the belt in a rematch with Windham the next night.

Another short stint in Southeastern Championship Wrestling followed, with LeDuc being given two more reigns with the Southeastern Heavyweight title. He was put over his former partner Bob Armstrong for the belt in August 1983 and began a feud with Robert Fuller, another former partner. During the course of this feud, the belt changed hands twice. Fuller was booked to win the belt from LeDuc, but LeDuc won a subsequent match to win the title for his sixth and final reign. LeDuc held the belt until vacating the title when he left the promotion.

On March 12, 1984, LeDuc teamed with former kayfabe rival Jerry Lawler to win the AWA Southern Tag Team Championship from Elijah Akeem and Kareem Muhammad. In a six-man match the following week, LeDuc teamed with Lawler and Jimmy Hart, who was their manager but wrestled on occasion. During the match, LeDuc revealed that his reconciliation with Lawler was a setup, as LeDuc and Hart turned on Lawler by walking away to leave Lawler by himself. As a result, the tag team title was vacated and the feud was rekindled.

=== Return to Montreal (1984–1986) ===
LeDuc returned to Montreal for the first time since 1973. Since time he was working for Lutte Internationale promoted by Gino Brito. He feuded with Abdullah the Butcher, Sailor White, Haku, and The Masked Superstar. On November 15, 1985, he lost to WWF Intercontiental Champion Tito Santana at WWF/Lutte Internationale house show.

=== Puerto Rico (1985–1986) ===
While wrestling in Puerto Rico, LeDuc was booked in his final championship reign. He defeated Hercules Ayala on January 6, 1986, to win the World Wrestling Council's North American Heavyweight Championship. He held the belt for just over two months before dropping it to Al Perez on March 7.

=== Return to the States (1986) ===
LeDuc returned to the States in early 1986 after spending time in Puerto Rico and Montreal. He worked for the Continental Wrestling Association in Tennessee and feuded with Paul Diamond. He also worked for World Class Championship Wrestling in Texas where he occasionally teamed with Rick Rude. He would quietly leave wrestling and not wrestle at all in 1987.

=== World Wrestling Federation (1988) ===
LeDuc returned to wrestling after a year's absence. He made his first appearance for the World Wrestling Federation (WWF) on March 19, 1988, when he defeated Brady Boone in a dark match at a WWF Superstars taping. He made his first house show appearance on April 22, defeating Jose Luis Rivera in White Plains, New York. On May 9 at a show in Ontario, LeDuc added Frenchy Martin as his manager. On July 4 (in a match taped on June 21 in Glens Falls, NY, LeDuc made his first television appearance as "The Headbanger/Butcher LeDuc" on WWF Prime Time Wrestling. He lost to Brian Costello via disqualification after he refused to cease headbutting his preliminary opponent. On July 16 in Landover, MD he sustained his first pinfall loss when he was defeated by Sam Houston. His final WWF match came a day later when he again lost to Houston in Hershey, PA although he did have a match versus Tito Santana which was broadcast on July 25 on Prime Time Wrestling, but it was likely recorded much earlier. He suffered a pinfall loss in that encounter with Santana.

=== Later career (1989–1995) ===
The following year, LeDuc returned to Japan for another brief wrestling tour for Frontier Martial Arts Wrestling. He wrestled primarily in tag teams with Masanobu Kurisu. They lost each of these matches. His only victory in Japan came over Tarzan Goto in a singles match.

Following his stint in Japan, LeDuc retired from wrestling. On June 10, 1995, he wrestled one final event, teaming with Phil Hickerson to face Lawler and Valiant at the United States Wrestling Association's "Memphis Memories II" event. The match built upon the storyline feud between LeDuc and Lawler, and Lawler won the match for his team by pinning LeDuc.

In November 1995, he was scheduled to wrestle for Smoky Mountain Wrestling, teaming with Buddy Landel in a series of matches against The Punisher and Tommy Rich, but due to LeDuc retiring, The Bullet took his place teaming with Landel.

== Personal life ==
LeDuc's first wife died in a car accident in 1981. He remarried and was married at the time of his death in 1999. He had three children: two daughters, Nadine and Michele, and a son, Robert.

LeDuc appeared in the 1989 film No Holds Barred, which starred fellow professional wrestler Hulk Hogan.

LeDuc had many problems with diabetes toward the end of his life. While visiting his son in Atlanta, Georgia, LeDuc slipped in the shower. As a result of the injuries, he developed an infection that ultimately led to his death. He died of a lung infection on May 1, 1999, in Atlanta at the age of 54. After his death, the revelation that he and Paul LeDuc were not related caused a minor scandal on talk shows in Quebec.

== Championships and accomplishments ==
- Championship Wrestling from Florida
  - NWA Florida Heavyweight Championship (3 times)
  - NWA Florida Tag Team Championship (1 time) – with Paul LeDuc
  - NWA Southern Heavyweight Championship (Florida version) (1 time)
  - NWA United States Tag Team Championship (Florida version) (3 times) – with Thor the Viking (1), Pak Song (1), and Don Muraco
- Grand Prix Wrestling (Montreal)
  - Grand Prix Tag Team Championship (2 times) – with Paul LeDuc
- International Wrestling Association (Montreal)
  - IWA International Heavyweight Championship (1 time)
  - IWA International Tag Team Championship (1 time) – with Tony Baillargeon
- Mid-Atlantic Championship Wrestling
  - NWA Television Championship (2 times)
- NWA Mid-America – Continental Wrestling Association
  - AWA Southern Heavyweight Championship (2 times)
  - AWA Southern Tag Team Championship (1 time) – with Jerry Lawler
  - NWA Southern Tag Team Championship (Mid-America version) (1 time) – with Jean Louie
- NWA New Zealand
  - NWA British Commonwealth Heavyweight Championship (New Zealand version) (2 times)
- Southeastern Championship Wrestling
  - NWA Alabama Heavyweight Championship (1 time)
  - NWA Southeastern Heavyweight Championship (Northern Division) (6 times)
  - NWA Southeastern Tag Team Championship (5 times) – with Bob Armstrong (2) and Robert Fuller (3)
- Stampede Wrestling
  - NWA International Tag Team Championship (Calgary version) (1 time) – with Paul LeDuc
- United States Wrestling Association
  - Memphis Wrestling Hall of Fame (Class of 1995)
- World Wrestling Council
  - WWC North American Heavyweight Championship (1 time)
