= Jody Hamilton =

American professional wrestler (1938–2021)

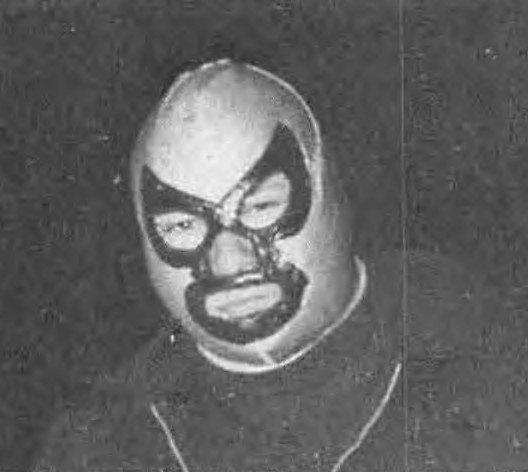
- Hamilton as The Assassin, circa 1979

Personal information
- Born: Joseph Nicholas Zwaduk III; August 28, 1938 St. Joseph, Missouri, U.S.
- Died: August 3, 2021 (aged 82) Griffin, Georgia, U.S.

Professional wrestling career
- Ring name(s): Jody Hamilton; Joe Hamilton; Ricky Monroe; Assassin #1; Masked Assassin #1; The Masked Assassin; Mighty Bolo; The Assassin; The Flame
- Billed height: 6 ft 1 in (1.85 m)
- Billed weight: 265 Ib (120 kg)
- Trained by: Michael DiBiase; Sonny Myers; Nick Roberts
- Debut: 1955
- Retired: 1988

Joseph Hamilton (August 28, 1938 – August 3, 2021) was an American professional wrestler, promoter, and trainer. He was best known as one half of the tag team The Assassins where he was called "Assassin #1". When the Assassins ended, He wrestled as "The Assassin" and "The Flame" both while wearing a mask.

Hamilton teamed up with Tom Renesto in late 1961 to form the masked heel (bad guy) team known as "The Assassins" and, for over a decade, he and Renesto wrestled all over the world with great success. Once Renesto retired, Hamilton kept the Assassins team alive by partnering with wrestlers such as Randy Colley and "Hercules" Hernandez under the trademark gold and black masks of the Assassins.

In the late 1980s, Hamilton founded Deep South Wrestling (DSW), where he also wrestled until a back injury forced him to retire in 1988. After Deep South Wrestling closed, he worked extensively for World Championship Wrestling both on the booking team and later on as a trainer at WCW's Power Plant training facility. In 2005, he reopened Deep South Wrestling, this time as an affiliate of World Wrestling Entertainment (WWE), to train wrestlers the WWE had signed to developmental contracts. In 2007, WWE abruptly ended their contract with DSW and the promotion suspended operations later in the year.

== Biography ==
=== Early Career (1955–1961) ===
Hamilton was born in Saint Joseph, Missouri. Before turning professional, he was a promising amateur boxer, but instead of continuing his training, he decided that he wanted to follow in the footsteps of his older brother Larry Hamilton. Larry was a professional wrestler billed as "The Missouri Mauler". Hamilton started working for "Gust Karras Promotions", a professional wrestling promotion based in Kansas City, Missouri, where he made his debut against Rip Hawk in a 40-minute match. By 1957, he had started teaming with his brother Larry and worked as a full-time professional wrestler. The Hamilton Brothers worked for the New York, NY, based Capitol Wrestling, (the precursor to World Wrestling Entertainment), where they were put in a storyline with the top tag team of the promotion Antonino Rocca and Miguel Pérez. In May 1958, the Hamilton Brothers faced Rocca and Pérez in the main event of a Madison Square Garden show making Jody, age 19 at the time, the youngest man to ever co-star in a main event at Madison Square Garden.

After the Hamilton brothers time in New York, Jody Hamilton decided to strike out on his own working as a singles wrestler. As a singles wrestler, he first got a promotional push by NWA Western States booker, Doc Sarpolis, who billed him as "Silent" Joe Hamilton. Hamilton has revealed in recent years that the "Silent" moniker was because he was not very good at interviews and promos. After working in Texas, he worked in Oklahoma and Florida. When he left Florida in 1961 he intended to return to Oklahoma but an offer from Georgia Championship Wrestling (GCW) would change the direction of Hamilton's career.

=== Masked Assassins (1961–1974) ===
The original plan for Hamilton was that he was going to wrestle under a mask as "The Iron Russian", but once he got to Atlanta the plans had changed and instead, he became “The Assassin”. After working as a singles competitor Hamilton was given a partner in late 1961, another masked Assassin, Tom Renesto. Renesto had teamed with Hamilton's older brother Larry but the two did not know each other before stepping into the ring in December 1961. The team worked well together from the onset and soon moved up the card towards the main events. For over a dozen years Hamilton and Renesto teamed together as the "vile" Assassins, a team hated for their "rulebreaking ways" wherever they wrestled. The Assassins, or the Masked Assassins as they were sometimes billed, worked all over the world for promotions in Georgia, California, Australia, the Far East, Japan and Canada. The only place the duo did not work as the Assassins was in the Carolinas where they were billed as "The Great Bolo" (Renesto) and "The Mighty Bolo" (Hamilton) because Renesto had worked for Jim Crockett Promotions as The Great Bolo before teaming up with Hamilton, and was more known in that region under the Bolo name.

The Assassins longest stay with one promotion was from 1968 to 1972 where they worked for Georgia Championship Wrestling and held the NWA Georgia Tag Team Championship a record-breaking 12 times. While in Georgia the team worked storylines with teams such as ”the Torres Brothers” (Ramon and Alberto), Terry and Dory Funk and the team of Ray Gunkel and Buddy Fuller. Their most successful and profitable feud came against the team of ”Tiny” Smith and Luke Brown known as "The Kentuckians". The matches between the Assassins and the Kentuckians drew sellout crowds up the east coast of the United States from Florida to the Carolinas. At times the Assassins would be backed up by Jody's brother the Missouri Mauler to take on the Kentuckians and their "fellow hillbilly" Haystacks Calhoun.

During their time in GCW Renesto became more and more involved in the booking of the promotion in the hopes of turning a decline in attendance around. Renesto is credited with turning the territory around with a series of hotly contested angles that brought the fans back. In 1972 after GCW owner Ray Gunkel died Gunkel's widow Ann Gunkel split off from the National Wrestling Alliance associated GCW and started her own company, called "All-South Wrestling", with Tom Renesto as the head booker. With his backstage responsibilities expanded Renesto cut back on his wrestling dates as Hamilton was pushed as a singles wrestler. In October 1972 Renesto unmasked on television, rumor had it that GCW was going to publish pictures of the Assassins without their masks on and Renesto wanted to beat them to the punch. After the unmasking Renesto would still occasionally team with Hamilton both with and without the mask but the glory days of the Assassins ended when Renesto took off the mask.

=== After Renesto (1974–1987) ===
When All-South Wrestling folded in 1974, both Hamilton and Renesto returned to Georgia Championship Wrestling, deciding to bury any past animosity. Renesto retired from the ring and focused more on the booking aspects of GCW while Hamilton started to work as a singles wrestler billed simply as "The Assassin". When he joined GCW Hamilton started a storyline with Mr. Wrestling II that would become the longest running storyline in Georgia wrestling history. Over the following years the Assassin would enlist several other "Assassins" to team with him as he fought against Mr. Wrestling II and various face partners. One of these partners was Randy Colley, who would go on to greater success as one of The Moondogs in the 1980s. Together Hamilton and Colley would hold the NWA Georgia Tag Team Championship on two occasions. Colley and Roger Smith would team together as the Assassins in Memphis.

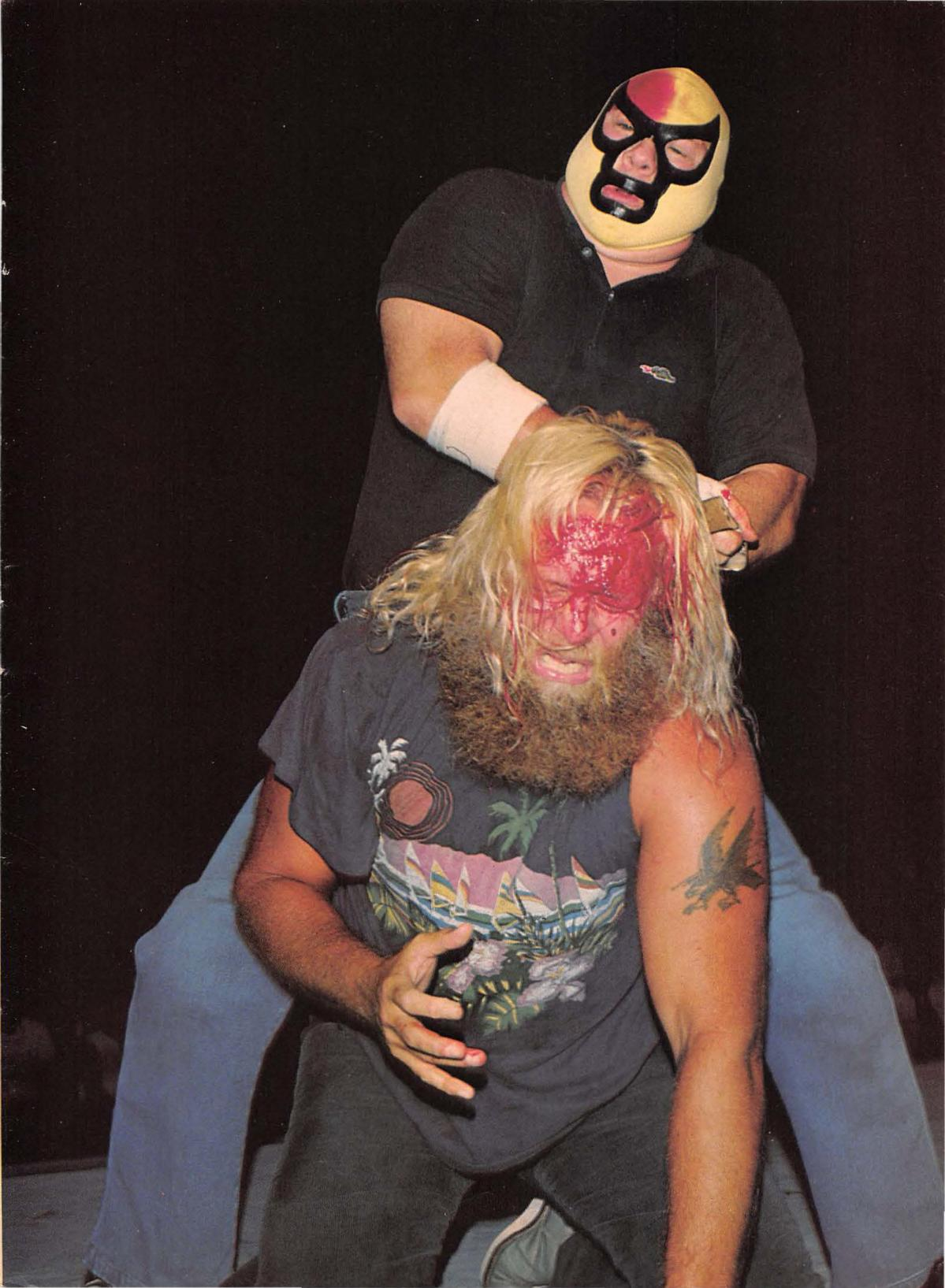
The Assassin (top) chokes Jimmy Valiant (bottom) with a belt, circa 1984

While GCW was Hamilton's "home promotion" he also competed for other promoters all over the southeast, especially in Florida and Alabama working for promotions such as Championship Wrestling from Florida, NWA Mid-America and Southeast Championship Wrestling. Hamilton used his “Assassin” gimmick but did not find another partner to recreate the Assassins, instead he would team with local stars such as Ron Fuller and Don Carson. By the beginning of the 1980s he decided to return to his roots in Oklahoma, after having worked more or less exclusively in the southeast for ten years or more. First, he worked for Central States Wrestling where he teamed with both Ernie Ladd and Angel to win the local version of the NWA United States Tag Team title. He would also hold the NWA Central States Heavyweight Championship, which was the main title for the promotion. After working for Central States Hamilton switched to Bill Watts’ Mid-South Wrestling promotion. In Mid-South he teamed up the Grappler, and turned on Ernie Ladd. In Jim Crockett Promotions in 1984, he teamed with yet another “Assassin #3”, this time it was ”Hercules” Hernandez under the gold and black mask. Hernandez's run under the golden mask ended when he was unmasked by Jimmy Valiant after a match in Toronto, Ontario as part of Valiant's lengthy feud with Paul Jones’ army.

In the mid 1980s, Hamilton retired the golden mask and adopted a new ring identity: "The Flame", together with another masked man going by the name “Fire”, he won the AWA Southern Tag Team Championship in 1986. He would also hold the NWA Southeast Continental Heavyweight Championship on four occasions.

=== Deep South Championship Wrestling (1986–1988) ===
In 1986, Hamilton started a small independent promotion in Georgia called Deep South Championship Wrestling. He worked both backstage and in the ring under his “Flame” ring persona. One night in 1988, he was thrown from the top rope during a match and landed wrong, the fall caused him to break the lumbar vertebrae in his back. Because Hamilton was in no shape to run a wrestling promotion, he sold it to someone else, only to see that person go out of business without ever putting on a wrestling show.

=== World Championship Wrestling (1988–2001) ===
Once Hamilton recovered from his back injury, he opened the official training center for World Championship Wrestling, the Power Plant. With Hamilton as director of the school it produced talent such as Kevin Nash, Diamond Dallas Page, Bill Goldberg, and the Big Show over the years.

As well as working at the Power Plant, Hamilton was also used as a manager in 1993, mainly managing Paul Orndorff, in addition to Orndorff's tag team partners The Equalizer and Paul Roma. He was inducted into the WCW Hall of Fame as part of the 1994 class on May 22, 1994 at The Civic Center in Philadelphia, Pennsylvania.

When WCW was bought out by the WWF in March 2001, the Power Plant was closed but Hamilton continued to train wrestlers.

=== Deep South Wrestling (2005–2007) ===
In 2005, World Wrestling Entertainment (formerly World Wrestling Federation) reached an agreement with Hamilton wherein Hamilton would open a new version of Deep South Wrestling for WWE to use as a training ground. The company ran shows on a regular basis featuring WWE-contracted talent until April 18, 2007, when WWE ended its relationship with DSW. DSW ceased operations the next day in 2007, having held what turned out to be its final event on April 12.

=== Rampage Pro Wrestling ===
In February 2009, Hamilton officially returned to the business, joining Rampage Pro Wrestling, an independent promotion based out of Warner Robins, Georgia. He was the director of their television show that airs locally on multiple channels in the middle Georgia area. His son, Nick Patrick, also joined the promotion, though only in the on-camera commissioner role. In April 2009, the promotion released Hamilton, citing that they needed to cut costs. Nick stayed on with the promotion and took over his father's job as the television show director. The company brought Hamilton back later in the year in October. Hamilton and Patrick became heavily involved in producing the company's weekly television show that aired in the Middle Georgia area on the local FOX affiliate.

== Lawsuit against WWE ==
In April 2009, Hamilton filed a lawsuit against WWE in Fulton County, GA over how the working agreement with his promotion, Deep South Wrestling, was terminated. His attorney claimed that WWE "fraudulently contrived a reason to end the agreement" without giving the 90-days notice that the contract required. The suit also claimed that WWE illegally entered the Deep South building in McDonough, GA and took property belonging to Hamilton. It also claimed the WWE Executive Vice President of Talent Relations, John Laurinaitis, warned wrestlers who continued to work with Deep South or Hamilton would be blackballed in the wrestling business. Two unnamed professional wrestlers who were under WWE contract at the time confirmed Hamilton's claim that Laurinaitis made the threatening speech. WWE attempted to get the lawsuit dismissed before it went to trial, but was not successful. On January 22, 2010, Hamilton settled with WWE out of court. The settlement was not disclosed.

== Personal life ==
Hamilton's son, Nick Patrick, was a referee for Georgia Championship Wrestling/Championship Wrestling from Georgia from 1980–1985, WCW from 1988–2001, and WWE from 2001–2008.

== Death ==
Hamilton died in hospice care on August 3, 2021, at the age of 82. News of Hamilton's death was broken over social media by his son, Nick.

== Championships and accomplishments ==
- Central States Wrestling

- NWA Central States Heavyweight Championship (1 time)

- Championship Wrestling from Florida

- NWA Florida Television Championship (1 time)
- NWA Southern Heavyweight Championship (Florida version) (2 times)
- NWA United States Tag Team Championship (Florida version) (1 time) – with Assassin #2
- NWA World Tag Team Championship (Florida version) (1 time) – with Assassin #2

- Continental Wrestling Association

- AWA Southern Tag Team Championship (4 times) – with Assassin #2

- Deep South Wrestling

- Deep South Heavyweight Championship (3 times)

- Georgia Wrestling

- Georgia Wrestling Hall of Fame: The Assassins

- Mid-South Sports/Georgia Championship Wrestling

- NWA Georgia Heavyweight Championship (1 time)
- NWA Georgia Tag Team Championship (14 times) – with Assassin #2 (12), Assassin #2 (2)
- NWA Macon Tag Team Championship (2 times) – with Assassin #2
- NWA Southeastern Tag Team Championship (Georgia version) (4 times) – with Assassin #2
- NWA Southern Tag Team Championship (Georgia version) (1 time) – with Assassin #2
- NWA World Tag Team Championship (Georgia version) (2 times) – with Assassin #2

- NWA All-Star Wrestling

- NWA Canadian Tag Team Championship (Vancouver version) (2 times) – with Assassin #2
- NWA World Tag Team Championship (Vancouver version) (1 time) – with Assassin #2

- NWA Hollywood Wrestling

- NWA Americas Tag Team Championship (2 times) – with Tom Renesto (1), John Tolos (1)
- NWA "Beat the Champ" Television Championship (1 time)
- NWA North American Tag Team Championship (Los Angeles/Japan version) (2 times) – with Assassin #2

- Professional Wrestling Hall of Fame

- Class of 2013 - Inducted as a member of The Assassins

- NWA Mid-America

- NWA World Tag Team Championship (Mid-America version) (1 time) – with Assassin # 2

- NWA Tri-State

- NWA United States Tag Team Championship (Tri-State version) (4 times) – with Assassin #2 (2), Ernie Ladd (1), Angel (1)

- Southeastern Championship Wrestling - Continental Championship Wrestling

- NWA Alabama Heavyweight Championship (1 time)
- NWA Louisiana Heavyweight Championship (2 times)
- NWA Louisiana Tag Team Championship (2 times) – with Assassin #2 (1), Angel (1)
- NWA Southeastern Continental Heavyweight Championship (4 times)
- NWA Southeastern Heavyweight Championship (Northern Division) (1 time)
- NWA Southeastern Tag Team Championship 1 time – with Don Carson
- NWA Southern Tag Team Championship (Gulf Coast version) (3 times) – with Assassin #2 (1), Don Carson (1), Billy Spears (1)
- NWA Tennessee Tag Team Championship (1 time) – with Ron Fuller

- World Championship Wrestling

- WCW Hall of Fame (Class of 1994)

- World Championship Wrestling (Australia)

- IWA World Tag Team Championship (1 time) – with Assassin #2

- Wrestling Observer Newsletter

- Wrestling Observer Newsletter Hall of Fame (Class of 2015) – with Tom Renesto

== Bibliography ==
- Hamilton, Jody; Teal, Scott (2006). Assassin: The man behind the mask. Crowbar Press. ISBN 0-9745545-3-7. Archived from the original on September 16, 2007.
