= Lord Humongous =

Professional wrestling character

Professional wrestling career
- Ring name: Lord Humongous
- Billed height: Various
- Billed weight: Various
- Debut: 1984

Lord Humongous is a professional wrestling character also known as a "gimmick" that was originally introduced in Memphis' Continental Wrestling Association (CWA) in 1984. The character was based on a gang leader called "the Humungus" or at times "Lord Humungus" from the 1981 movie Mad Max 2: The Road Warrior. The original Lord Humongous was portrayed by Mike Stark, who was tall and physically impressive like the character in the movie. Since Lord Humongous always wears a Hockey mask it allowed promoters to replace the man under the mask without having to publicly acknowledge that it was someone else playing the part. The character became a recurring gimmick in the CWA but was also used in other promotions after the CWA closed. The character has been played by a number of wrestlers including Jeff Van Camp Sr., Sid Vicious, Barry Buchanan and Sid's son Gunnar Eudy. Scott Hall wrestled as Lord Humongous in PWF out of Florida in 1989. John King wrestled as Lord Humongous in 1985 Texas All Star Wrestling along with Mad Maxx John Richmond aka Eli the Eliminator managed by Slick.

== Character history ==
The character was introduced as manager Jimmy Hart's latest "Monster heel" to challenge the Continental Wrestling Association's (CWA) dominant face Jerry "the King" Lawler. The original Lord Humongous was portrayed by Mike Stark, chosen for his impressive physique. Based on the character "the Humungus" from Mad Max 2: The Road Warrior movie, Lord Humongous would always wear a Hockey mask that would cover his entire face as well as ring gear that resembled the post-apocalyptic world of the movie.

Stark only played Lord Humongous for the first couple of months of 1984 before he was replaced by Jeff Van Camp under the mask without the CWA revealing that it was a different man playing the part. At that time, Lord Humongous was introduced to the public with an official music video “War Machine” by Kiss, which became his entrance theme. Jeff Van Camp Sr. reprised the character in 2019 in the revived Continental Championship Wrestling when he assisted Cowboy Dennis Gale in a "lights out" match Gale was scheduled against heel Jivin' Jerry Stubbs on May 11, 2019, in Dothan, AL during CCW 2.0 Fanfest.

The CWA reused the Lord Humongous ring character for some young wrestlers who had a very muscular physique. One such wrestler was Sid Eudy, who played Lord Humongous in 1987. He would later move on to work for both World Championship Wrestling (WCW) and the World Wrestling Federation (WWF) and would go on to win the WWF Championship and WCW World Heavyweight championships. In 2009 Sid's son Gunnar Eudy, a rookie with an impressive physique, played the same part his father did 22 years earlier. In the 1990s rookie Barry Buchanan would play the part of Lord Humongous before moving on to working for the WWF as Bull Buchanan.

== List of wrestlers who portrayed Lord Humongous ==
Wrestler	Time
Mike Stark	1984
Jeff Van Camp Sr.	1984-1985; 2019
Gary Nation	1984; 2017
John Gavin	1984- (on and off)
Sid Eudy	1987-1989
Barry Buchanan	1990s
Randy Lewis	1990s
Tim Olsen	1990s
John Bass	March 6, 1999; April 11, 2009; 2011–present
Richard Bailey	2000s
Gunnar Eudy	2009
Clint Barlow	October 16, 2010 – April 2, 2011
