= CWF Tag Team Championship =

Professional wrestling tag team championship

Details
- Promotion: Southeast Championship Wrestling; Continental Championship Wrestling; Continental Wrestling Federation
- Date established: February 1974
- Date retired: 1989

Other names
- NWA Southeastern Tag Team Championship (1974–1986); NWA Continental Tag Team Championship (1986–1988)
Statistics
- First champions: Frank Monte and Nick DeCarlo
- Final champions: Jimmy Golden (14) and Brian Lee
- Most reigns: The Midnight Express (14 reigns)

The NWA Southeastern Tag Team Championship was the major tag team championship in the National Wrestling Alliance's Alabama territory, Southeastern Championship Wrestling (SECW). It existed from 1974 until November 1986, when it became the NWA Continental Tag Team Championship, after SECW changed its name to Continental Championship Wrestling (CCW). In 1988, when CCW changed its name to the Continental Wrestling Federation (CWF), it became the CWF Tag Team Championship. The CWF closed in 1989 and the title was retired.

== Title history ==
Key
No.	Overall reign number
Reign	Reign number for the specific team—reign numbers for the individuals are in parentheses, if different
Days	Number of days held

No.	Champion	Championship change			Reign statistics		Notes	Ref.
No.	Champion	Date	Event	Location	Reign	Days	Notes	Ref.
NWA Southeastern Tag Team Championship
1	Frank Monte and Nick DeCarlo	February 1974	House show	N/A	1	(Note: Due to at least one date being uncertain it is not possible to correctly calculate the reign length)	Awarded	
2	Tojo Yamamoto and Mr. Kamikaze	April 17, 1974	House show	Nashville, Tennessee	1	7		
3	Frank Monte and Nick DeCarlo	April 24, 1974	House show	Nashville, Tennessee	2			
4	Duke Myers and The Blue Scorpion	November 1974	House show	N/A	1			
5	Ricky Gibson and Jimmy Golden	June 1975	House show	N/A	1			
6	The Masked Superstars (Leon Baxter and Dick Dunn)	March 7, 1976	House show	Knoxville, Tennessee	1	33	Defeated Robert Fuller and Jimmy Golden in a tournament final	
7	Robert Fuller and Jimmy Golden	April 9, 1976	House show	Knoxville, Tennessee	1			
8	David Schultz and Bill Ash	June 1976	House show	Knoxville, Tennessee	1			
9	The Von Steigers (Kurt and Karl Von Steiger)	July 2, 1976	House show	Knoxville, Tennessee	1	7		
10	Robert Fuller and Jimmy Golden	July 9, 1976	House show	Knoxville, Tennessee	2			
11	The Von Steigers (Kurt and Karl Von Steiger)	January 1977	House show	N/A	2			
12	Tommy Rich and Bill Dundee	April 18, 1977	House show	Memphis, Tennessee	1	10		
13	The Von Steigers (Kurt and Karl Von Steiger)	April 28, 1977	House show	Knoxville, Tennessee	3	9		
14	Tony Charles and "Mr. Knoxville"	May 7, 1977	House show	Knoxville, Tennessee	1	34		
15	"Mr. Knoxville" (2) and Bob Orton Jr.	June 10, 1977	House show	Knoxville, Tennessee	1	77	Charles gave his half to Orton	
16	Bob Armstrong and Jos LeDuc	August 26, 1977	House show	Knoxville, Tennessee	1	7		
17	"Mr. Knoxville" (3) and Bob Orton Jr.	September 2, 1977	House show	Knoxville, Tennessee	2	435		
18	The Assassin and Don Carson	November 11, 1978	House show	Knoxville, Tennessee	1	−286		
19	Robert Fuller (3) and Georgia Jaw Cracker (2)	January 29, 1978	House show	Knoxville, Tennessee	1			
—		1978	—	—			Armstrong, who was suspended at the time, is unmasked and titles are stripped.	
20	Ricky Gibson and Jimmy Golden	March 19, 1978	House show	Knoxville, Tennessee	2	28	Won tournament	
21	Bicentennial Kings (Dennis Condrey and Phil Hickerson)	April 16, 1978	House show	Knoxville, Tennessee	1	103		
22	Jimmy Golden (3) and Bob Roop	July 28, 1978	House show	Knoxville, Tennessee	1	14		
23	Bicentennial Kings (Dennis Condrey and Phil Hickerson)	August 11, 1978	House show	Knoxville, Tennessee	2	49		
24	Jimmy Golden (4) and Rip Smith	September 29, 1978	House show	Knoxville, Tennessee	1	35		
25	Bicentennial Kings (Dennis Condrey and Phil Hickerson)	November 3, 1978	House show	Knoxville, Tennessee	3	28		
26	Kevin Sullivan and Ken Lucas	December 1, 1978	House show	Knoxville, Tennessee	1	51		
27	Jerry Blackwell and The Invader (3)	January 21, 1979	House show	Knoxville, Tennessee	1	14		
28	Bob Armstrong (3) and Ken Lucas	February 4, 1979	House show	Knoxville, Tennessee	1			
—		February 1979	—	—			Vacated for undocumented reasons	
29	Bob Orton Jr. (4) and Bob Roop	February 11, 1979	House show	Knoxville, Tennessee	1	102	Defeated Kevin Sullivan and Ken Lucas in tournament final.	
30	Jerry Blackwell (2) and Dick Slater	May 24, 1979	House show	Knoxville, Tennessee	1			
—		June 1979	—	—			Vacated for undocumented reasons	
31	Ron and Buddy Fuller	June 22, 1979	House show	Knoxville, Tennessee	1	7	Won tournament	
32	Toru Tanaka and Mr. Fuji	June 29, 1979	House show	Knoxville, Tennessee	1	30		
33	Ron (2) and Robert Fuller (4)	July 29, 1979	House show	Knoxville, Tennessee	1	47		
34	Jimmy Golden (3) and Norvell Austin	September 14, 1979	House show	Knoxville, Tennessee	1	49		
35	Dick Slater (2) and Paul Orndorff	November 2, 1979 (NLT)	House show	N/A	1			
36	Dennis Condrey (4) and David Schultz (2)	November 1979	House show	N/A	1			
—		February 3, 1980	—	—			Held up after match against The Matador and Mike Stallings.	
37	Mike Stallings and The Matador	February 10, 1980	House show	Knoxville, Tennessee	1		Won the rematch	
38	Robert Fuller (5) and Eddie Boulder	February 1980	House show	N/A	1			
39	Manchurians (Tio and Tapu)	March 2, 1980	House show	Knoxville, Tennessee	1			
40	Ron (3) and Robert Fuller (6)	March 1980	House show	N/A	2			
41	Manchurians (Tio and Tapu)	June 6, 1980	House show	Knoxville, Tennessee	2			
42	The Big C's (Jerry Brown (5) and Don Carson (2))	October 1980	House show	N/A	1		On the 11/1/1980 episode of Southeastern Championship Wrestling it is revealed the Big C's were Jerry Brown and Don Carson.	
43	Robert Fuller (7) and Jos LeDuc	October 7, 1980	House show	Mobile, Alabama	1	19		
44	Ron Bass and Super Pro	October 26, 1980	House show	Pensacola, Florida	1	21		
45	Bob Armstrong (4) and Jos LeDuc	November 16, 1980	House show	Pensacola, Florida	2			
48	Dennis Condrey (7) and Randy Rose (3)	1980	House show	N/A	2			
49	Bob (5) and Brad Armstrong	December 1980	House show	N/A	1			
50	Dennis Condrey (8) and Randy Rose (4)	January 1981	House show	N/A	3			
51	Norvell Austin (2) and Paul Orndorff (3)	February 21, 1981	House show	Dothan, Alabama	2	0		
—		N/A	—	—			Austin's suffered a neck injury from Condrey and Rose	
52	Dennis Condrey (9) and Randy Rose (5)	March 1, 1981	House show	Pensacola, Florida	4	37		
53	Bob (6) and Brad Armstrong	April 7, 1981	House show	N/A	2			
—		April 1981	—	—			Vacated when Bob Armstrong is injsured	
55	Dennis Condrey (10) and Randy Rose (6)	June 1981	House show	Birmingham, Alabama	5	29		
56	Bob Armstrong (7) and Robert Fuller (8)	August 25, 1981 (NLT)	House show	Mobile, Alabama	2	33		
57	Jimmy Golden (3) and Mongolian Stomper	September 27, 1981 (NLT)	House show	N/A	1	31		
58	Robert Fuller (9) and Jos LeDuc	October 28, 1981	House show	Montgomery, Alabama	2	6		
59	Randy Rose (7) and Jimmy Golden (5)	November 3, 1981	House show	Mobile, Alabama	1	12		
60	Robert Fuller (10) and Jos LeDuc	November 15, 1981	House show	Pensacola, Florida	3			
—		1981	—	—			Fuller and LeDuc split.	
61	Kiwi Sheepherders (Luke Williams and Jonathan Boyd)	January 2, 1982	House show	Dothan, Alabama	1	252	Records unclear as to whom they defeated.	
62	Robert Fuller (11) and Jimmy Golden (6)	September 11, 1982	House show	Dothan, Alabama	3	16		
63	The Midnight Express; Dennis Condrey (11), Norvell Austin (3) and Randy Rose (8))	September 27, 1982	House show	Birmingham, Alabama	6	69	All three members of the Midnight Express defend the title at various times.	
64	Mongolian Stomper (2) and Stomper Junior	December 5, 1982 (NLT)	House show	N/A	1			
65	The Midnight Express; Dennis Condrey (12), Norvell Austin (4) and Randy Rose (9))	December 1982	House show	N/A	7			
—		1982	—	—			Championship vacated for undocumented reasons	
66	The Midnight Express; Dennis Condrey (13), Norvell Austin (5) and Randy Rose (10))	February 28, 1983	House show	Birmingham, Alabama	8		Defeated the Kiwi Sheepherders and Fuller and Golden.	
67	Ken Lucas (3) and Dizzy Ed Hogan	June 1983	House show	N/A	1			
68	The Midnight Express; Dennis Condrey (14), Norvell Austin (6) and Randy Rose (11))	July 1983	House show	N/A	9			
69	Ken Lucas (4) and Dizzy Ed Hogan (2)	July 1983	House show	N/A	2			
70	The Midnight Express; Dennis Condrey (15), Norvell Austin (7) and Randy Rose (12))	August 8, 1983	House show	Birmingham, Alabama	10			
71	Robert Fuller (12) and Jimmy Golden (7)	N/A	House show	N/A	4			
72	The Midnight Express; Dennis Condrey (16), Norvell Austin (8) and Randy Rose (13))	August 1983	House show	N/A	11			
73	Brad (4) and Scott Armstrong	October 1983	House show	N/A	1			
74	Devastation, Inc. (Ron Starr and Wayne Farris)	November 7, 1983	House show	Birmingham, Alabama	1			
—		December 1983	—	—			Starr left area.	
75	Arn Anderson and Jerry Stubbs (2)	January 15, 1984	House show	Montgomery, Alabama	1	71	Defeated Jimmy Golden and Jacques Rougeau, Jr. in tournament final.	
76	Robert Fuller (13) and Jimmy Golden (8)	March 26, 1984	House show	Birmingham, Alabama	5	40		
77	Arn Anderson and Jerry Stubbs (3)	May 5, 1984	House show	Dothan, Alabama	2	30	Titles returned when Fuller injured.	
78	The Rat Patrol (Steve Armstrong and Johnny Rich)	June 4, 1984	House show	Birmingham, Alabama	1	42		
79	Arn Anderson and Jerry Stubbs (4)	July 16, 1984	House show	Birmingham, Alabama	3	21		
80	The Rat Patrol (Steve Armstrong and Johnny Rich)	August 6, 1984	House show	Birmingham, Alabama	2			
81	Arn Anderson (5) and Pat Rose	1984	House show	N/A	4			
82	The Rat Patrol (Steve Armstrong and Johnny Rich)	October 1984	House show	N/A	3			
83	Randy (14) and Pat Rose (2)	November 12, 1984	House show	N/A	1	131		
84	The Nightmares (Ken Wayne and Danny Davis)	March 23, 1985	House show	Dothan, Alabama	1	−75		
85	The Rat Patrol (Steve Armstrong and Johnny Rich)	January 7, 1985	House show	Birmingham, Alabama	4			
—		1985	—	—	1		Titles held up after match with Nightmares.	
87	The Nightmares (Ken Wayne and Danny Davis)	May 25, 1985	House show	N/A	2	121	Won rematch.	
87	The Soul Patrol (Norvell Austin (7) and Brickhouse Brown)	September 23, 1985	House show	Birmingham, Alabama	1	7		
88	The Nightmares (Ken Wayne and Danny Davis)	September 30, 1985	House show	Birmingham, Alabama	3	140		
89	Johnny (2) and Tommy Rich	February 17, 1986	House show	Birmingham, Alabama	1	27		
90	Robert Fuller (14) and Jimmy Golden (9)	March 16, 1986	House show	Pensacola, Florida	6	85		
91	Tommy Rich (2) and Steve Armstrong (2)	June 9, 1986	House show	Birmingham, Alabama	1	14		
92	Robert Fuller (15) and Jimmy Golden (10)	June 23, 1986	House show	Dothan, Alabama	7	105		
93	The Bullet (8) and Steve Armstrong (3)	October 6, 1986	House show	Birmingham, Alabama	1			
94	New Guinea Headhunters (Headhunter 1 and Headhunter 2)	November 1986	House show	N/A	1			
—		November 1986	—	—			Replaced	
NWA Continental Tag Team Championship
95	Tony Anthony and Jerry Stubbs (4)	November 15, 1986	House show	Knoxville, Tennessee	1	40	Defeated The Nightmares.	
96	The Nightmares (Ken Wayne and Danny Davis)	December 25, 1986	House show	Birmingham, Alabama	4	60		
97	Tony Anthony and Jerry Stubbs (5)	February 23, 1987	House show	Birmingham, Alabama	2	63		
98	Robert Fuller (16) and Jimmy Golden (11)	April 27, 1987	House show	Birmingham, Alabama	8			
99	Tony Anthony and Jerry Stubbs (6)	May 1987	House show	N/A	3			
100	Robert Fuller (17) and Jimmy Golden (12)	May 25, 1987	House show	Birmingham, Alabama	9	285		
101	The Southern Boys (Steve Armstrong (4) and Tracy Smothers)	March 5, 1988	House show	Dothan, Alabama	1	78		
102	The Nightmares (Ken Wayne and Danny Davis)	May 22, 1988	House show	Montgomery, Alabama	5	7		
103	D.I. Bob Carter and Detroit Demolition	May 29, 1988	House show	Birmingham, Alabama	1	50		
104	Lord Humongous and Shane Douglas	July 18, 1988	House show	Birmingham, Alabama	1			
105	Tony Anthony and Jerry Stubbs (7)	1988	House show	N/A	4		Awarded when Douglas leaves area	
—		1988	—	—			SCW closed	
CWF Tag Team Championship
106	Tony Anthony and Jerry Stubbs (8)	November 11, 1988	House show	Knoxville, Tennessee	1	17	Defeated The Bullet and Brad Armstrong.	
107	The Bullet (9) and Brad Armstrong (5)	November 28, 1988	House show	Birmingham, Alabama	1	27		
108	Tony Anthony and Jerry Stubbs (9)	December 25, 1988	House show	Knoxville, Tennessee	2	54		
109	Johnny (3) and Davey Rich	February 17, 1989	House show	Knoxville, Tennessee	1	77		
110	Masahiro Chono and Mike Davis	May 5, 1989	House show	Knoxville, Tennessee	1	19		
111	Jimmy Golden (13) and Mongolian Stomper (3)	May 24, 1989	House show	Murphy, North Carolina	1			
—		July 1989	—	—			Stomper leaves area.	
112	The Southern Boys (Steve Armstrong (4) and Tracy Smothers)	July 1989	House show	N/A	1		Awarded	
113	Jimmy Golden (14) and Brian Lee	August 26, 1989	House show	Dothan, Alabama	1			
—	Deactivated	1989	—	—	—	—	CWF closed	

== See also ==
- National Wrestling Alliance
- Southeast Championship Wrestling
