= Ron Fuller (wrestler) =

American professional wrestler and manager (born 1948)

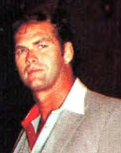
- Welch, c. 1983

Personal information
- Born: Ronald Welch; March 3, 1948 (age 78) Dyersburg, Tennessee, U.S.
- Education: University of Miami

Professional wrestling career
- Ring name(s): Ron Fuller; Ron Welch; Tennessee Stud
- Billed height: 6 ft 9 in (206 cm)
- Billed weight: 260 lb (118 kg)
- Billed from: Knoxville, Tennessee
- Debut: 1972
- Retired: 2020

Ronald Welch (born March 3, 1948) is a retired professional wrestler and manager better known by his ring names Ron Fuller and Tennessee Stud. He is the elder brother of Robert Fuller ("Col. Robert Parker"). The brothers co-owned Continental Championship Wrestling for a time.

== Early life ==
At 6'9", Fuller was a basketball stand-out at Briarcliff High School in Atlanta and won a scholarship to the University of Miami where he was a three-year letterman.

== Professional wrestling career ==
Upon graduating from the University of Miami, Fuller followed in his family's footsteps and became a professional wrestler. He started out with his grandfather and father's promotion in Tennessee and eventually bought it out. In the 1970s and early 1980s, Fuller expanded his territory from Tennessee to the Florida panhandle, naming it Southeastern Championship Wrestling and making it a "hot spot" for Southern wrestling.

In the early 1980s, Fuller wore a mask and called himself the "Tennessee Stud". He teamed with his brother Robert and a cousin, Jimmy Golden, several times, challenging for the NWA Southeast Tag Team Championship held by the heel team of Arn Anderson and Jerry Stubbs. The Fullers came up on the short end in their title chase, with the storyline being that Robert was injured by Anderson and Stubbs. Ron went through a variety of tag team partners, including André the Giant, to try to beat the Anderson/Stubbs tandem. Fuller finally found a partner in Bob Armstrong and seemed to beat Anderson and Stubbs, but the title was held up by NWA President Bob Geigel, who ordered a rematch. Fuller turned heel on Armstrong, allowing Stubbs and Anderson to keep the belts.

As the territory's owner, he created a new singles belt called the NWA Southeast Continental Heavyweight Championship. In the storyline, he named Freebird Michael Hayes the champion. The following week, Hayes arrived in Dothan, AL, to defend the belt against Fuller. Fuller won and planned to leave the area to defend it. However, Fuller was "contractually obligated" to stay in the territory. Fuller tore up the contract, but TV announcer Charlie Platt revealed it was a photocopy. Bob Armstrong sneaked up behind Fuller, holding a piece of paper. When Fuller asked where the original copy was, Platt replied, "Right behind you." When Fuller turned, Armstrong punched him and he fell over the announcers' table. Armstrong then gained his revenge on Fuller by winning the Continental title.

In 1985, Fuller changed the name of the territory to Continental Championship Wrestling, to compete with Vince McMahon's World Wrestling Federation. At that time, he created the Stud Stable and renewed his feud with Armstrong. In a steel cage tag team match, Fuller teamed with cousin Jimmy Golden against Armstrong and Robert Fuller. Robert turned heel and all three beat up Armstrong. Armstrong's sons Brad, Steve, and Scott came to their father's rescue, but he was already injured. The next week, Fuller revealed a clause in the contract claiming, "Because Armstrong lost (though a pin never occurred), he must leave the territory." In the weeks that followed, The Stud Stable eliminated all of the Armstrongs except for Brad. Brad teamed with 7'7" wrestler Big John Harris. While Fuller fought Harris outside the ring, Golden and Robert were about to "squash" Brad. Suddenly, a masked man ran to the ring and saved him. The man put Robert in the figure-four leglock and Robert screamed in pain. The masked man spoke and said, "You can call me The Bullet!" Hearing him sound like Bob Armstrong, Fuller cried out in anger. In the following weeks, Fuller talked with Bob Geigel, who declared on television, "If The Bullet is unmasked as Bob Armstrong, he is banned for life."

Over the next two years, Fuller and his stable tried unmasking Armstrong, but never succeeded. In a steel cage match, Armstrong locked Fuller in the figure-four and kept it clamped on. The storyline was that the move broke Fuller's leg, giving him a storyline to retire as a wrestler. Still working as a manager, he brought in different wrestlers to the Stud Stable. In 1986, he hired Kevin Sullivan to unmask Armstrong, but Sullivan revealed he had used Fuller as a pawn to start his own faction. He brought in the New Guinea Headhunters, Sheik Abdul (Saudi Arabia), and Kris von Kolt (Germany). Fuller and the Stud Stable turned face and put their differences with The Bullet aside. The Bullet, the Armstrongs and the Stud Stable then formed an alliance to battle Sullivan and his clique. Since Sullivan's faction were foreigners (kayfabe) who hated America, the alliance became American patriots. However, Sullivan brought up that Fuller could not wrestle because he was medically forced to retire, so Fuller set out to fluster Sullivan by donning his Tennessee Stud mask once again. In a throwback to Bob Armstrong's Bullet storyline, The Tennessee Stud arrived to wrestle on behalf of Ron Fuller.

After the feud ended, Golden and Robert turned heel again, but Ron retired as a face. He made on and off again appearances on TV and at arena shows. However, he really worked behind the scenes. In 1988, he sold Continental Championship Wrestling (which became the Continental Wrestling Federation) and retired from the business.

Throughout the 1990s, he helped bring World Championship Wrestling (WCW) shows to the old territory, but never worked full-time for the promotion. Following that he ran a series of shows in Knoxville at the Homer Hamilton Theater that ended up being a short-lived developmental area for WWE. Initially, Fuller retired to Tampa, Florida, but later moved to Tennessee, where he currently resides.

In 2017, Fuller started a podcast called the Studcast reliving his family history in professional wrestling.

On January 25, 2020, Fuller returned to the ring at the age of 72 teaming with his cousin Jimmy Golden to defeat the Dirty Blondes (Leo Brien and Mike Patrick) at Continental Championship Wrestling in Dothan, Alabama.

In 2020, he added a new chapter to his business accomplishments, that of author, when he released his first book titled "Brutus". Unlike previous wrestlers, this book wasn't about the business. It's a fictional adventure, about an African lion that escapes into the Great Smoky Mountains National Park.

== Championships and accomplishments ==
- All Japan Pro Wrestling
  - World's Strongest Tag Determination League Exciting Award (1983) – with Barry Windham
- Championship Wrestling from Florida
  - NWA Florida Heavyweight Championship (1 time)
  - NWA Florida Tag Team Championship (1 time) – with Jimmy Golden
  - NWA Southern Heavyweight Championship (Florida version) (1 time)
- George Tragos/Lou Thesz Professional Wrestling Hall of Fame
  - Lou Thesz Award 2026 – with the Welch/Fuller Family
- Mid-South Sports
  - NWA Georgia Heavyweight Championship (1 time)
- NWA Mid-America / Continental Wrestling Association
  - AWA Southern Heavyweight Championship (1 time)
  - NWA Southern Heavyweight Championship (Memphis version) (1 time)
  - NWA Tennessee Tag Team Championship (1 time) – with The Assassin
  - NWA United States Tag Team Championship (Mid-America version) (1 time) – with Robert Fuller
- Pro Wrestling Illustrated
  - PWI ranked him #370 of the top 500 singles wrestlers of the "PWI Years" in 2003
- Southeastern Championship Wrestling
  - NWA Alabama Heavyweight Championship (2 times)
  - NWA Southeast Continental Heavyweight Championship (1 time)
  - NWA Southeast Heavyweight Championship (5 times)
