= Bob Armstrong =

American professional wrestler (1939–2020)

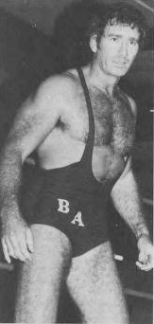
- Armstrong, c. 1982

Personal information
- Born: Joseph Melton James; October 3, 1939 Marietta, Georgia, U.S.
- Died: August 27, 2020 (aged 80) Pensacola, Florida, U.S.

Professional wrestling career
- Ring name(s): Alabama Jaw Jacker; Bob Armstrong; Georgia Jaw Cracker; Jim Durango; Bullet
- Billed height: 5 ft 11 in (1.80 m)
- Billed weight: 227 lb (103 kg)
- Debut: 1960
- Retired: May 11, 2019

Joseph Melton James (October 3, 1939 – August 27, 2020) was an American professional wrestler, better known by his ring name, "Bullet" Bob Armstrong. In the course of his career, which spanned five decades, Armstrong held numerous championships throughout the Southeastern United States. His four sons, Joseph Scott, Robert Bradley, Steve and Brian Girard, all became wrestlers.

== Early life ==
Joseph Melton James was born in Marietta, Georgia on October 3, 1939. When he was a child, Joseph James's father took him to see Gorgeous George wrestle. The young James was impressed and intrigued by the flamboyant performer. As a young man, James served in the Marine Corps in the early 1960s and was stationed in Korea. During his recruit training in Marine Corps Recruit Depot Parris Island on Parris Island, South Carolina, James was named Honor Man. After leaving the military, he began working for the Fair Oaks (later Cobb County) Fire Department as a firefighter in 1962.

== Professional wrestling career ==
=== Career (1960–1988) ===
He debuted as a wrestler in 1960, adopting the ring name "Bob Armstrong". By 1966, Armstrong had become a popular face in the Savannah, Georgia area, and in 1970 he ceased working as a firefighter and began focusing on his wrestling career.

Armstrong achieved considerable popularity in the Southeastern United States, particularly in Alabama and his home state of Georgia. He frequently wrestled for affiliates of the National Wrestling Alliance, and on October 9, 1974, in Miami Beach, Florida, Armstrong unsuccessfully challenged Jack Brisco for the NWA World Heavyweight Championship. While bench pressing a dumbbell weighing upwards of 180 lb (82 kg) in a gym in Georgia, the bench that Armstrong was lying upon broke, leading to the weight falling on his face. Armstrong's face was severely damaged and his nose was torn entirely off, and he required $38,000 USD worth of plastic surgery to repair it. While undergoing surgery, Armstrong donned a wrestling mask to conceal his disfigured features and began using the ring name "The Bullet". As "The Bullet", Armstrong feuded with the Stud Stable in Continental Championship Wrestling. He eventually discarded the mask after his surgeries were complete, but retained the nickname "Bullet" for the remainder of his career until retiring in 1988. Armstrong trained each of his sons to wrestle, and formed tag teams with them in the 1980s and 1990s. In the course of his career, he toured both Japan and Korea.

=== Semi-retirement (1992–1997, 2001) ===
Armstrong went into semi-retirement in 1988. In addition to making occasional appearance on the independent circuit in Georgia and Alabama, Armstrong acted as the commissioner of Smoky Mountain Wrestling and worked backstage with Southeast Championship Wrestling and the Continental Wrestling Federation. He came out of retirement and wrestled for Smoky Mountain Wrestling between 1992 and 1995 when the promotion closed its doors down. In 1995 he made a few appearances in the United States Wrestling Association. On April 27, 1996, he teamed with his son Brad to defeat Bunkhouse Buck and Lord Steven Regal at a World Championship Wrestling house show in Canton, Georgia. He lost to Ken Lucas at a Robert Gibson Promotion event in Mobile, Alabama, on February 22, 1997. Afterwards, he retired once again and did not wrestle for a few years.

On December 12, 2001, he teamed with Dusty Rhodes and Larry Zbyszko to defeat Barry Windham, Ron Reis and Steve Lawler at Turnbuckle Championship Wrestling.

=== Total Nonstop Action Wrestling (2002–2008) ===
Armstrong appeared on the first weekly Total Nonstop Action Wrestling pay-per-view on June 26, 2002, alongside fellow National Wrestling Alliance veterans Corsica Joe, Dory Funk, Jr., Harley Race, Jackie Fargo and Sarah Lee. His next appearance was on the August 14, 2002 pay-per-view, where he was introduced as an on-screen authority figure and informed Jeff Jarrett that he would face a mystery opponent one week later. The mystery opponent was revealed to be "The Masked Bullet", a masked wrestler who imitated Armstrong's mannerisms (although Armstrong himself came to the ringside during the match, proving that he was not the Bullet). On the August 28, 2002 pay-per-view, Jarrett fought the Bullet to a no contest before striking Armstrong with a chair. On the September 18, 2002 pay-per-view, the Bullet unmasked, revealing himself to be Armstrong's youngest son Brian Gerard James, who would subsequently go by "B.G. James" in TNA. On December 5, 2005, Armstrong underwent arthroscopic knee surgery. Despite being advised to refrain from wrestling until March 2006, Armstrong resumed wrestling later that month.

On the December 3, 2005 episode of Impact!, Armstrong returned to Total Nonstop Action Wrestling, congratulating the newly formed Four Live Kru on their unity. However, at Turning Point on December 11, 2005, the Four Live Kru disintegrated, with Konnan betraying fellow members Kip and B.G. James. Armstrong declared that he would reunite the Kru and unsuccessfully petitioned the fourth former member, Ron Killings, to that effect on the December 24, episode of Impact!. One week later, Armstrong tried once more to reform the group, this time approaching Konnan. Apparently willing to negotiate, Konnan led Armstrong backstage, only for Armstrong to be ambushed and beaten down by Konnan's newly formed stable, the Latin American Xchange (LAX). Footage from Armstrong's knee surgery earlier that month aired on iMPACT! in January 2006, with the kayfabe explanation that the assault at the hands of the LAX had necessitated the surgical repair of Armstrong's knee.

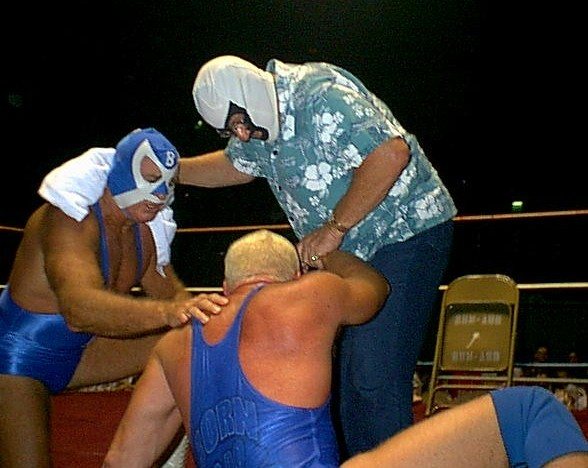
Armstrong (left) with his son Scott (bottom) and Mr. Wrestling II at a 2007 show

At Against All Odds on February 12, 2006, Kip and B.G. James (The James Gang) faced the Latin American Exchange, with B.G. intent upon avenging the harm done to his "daddy". The James Gang was victorious, but ambushed by the LAX after the match. They were saved when the returning Bob Armstrong entered the ring and chased LAX away. The confrontation led to a six-man bout between LAX and Armstrong and The James Gang at Destination X on March 12, which was won by Kip James. Despite the two consecutive victories, Armstrong remained hungry for revenge, and challenged Konnan to an arm wrestling contest on the April 8 Impact!. The contest did not finish due to interference from Homicide and the newest LAX member, Hernandez, who had been sent to the locker room prior. The James Gang (also sent backstage) ran in to help Armstrong. This led to a rematch at Lockdown on April 23, in which Armstrong scored the pin.

On the January 18, 2008 episode of Impact!, B.G. chose Armstrong as his tag team partner for his Feast or Fired Tag Title shot. The two lost the championship match. This was his final appearance with TNA.

=== Final years (2009–2019) ===
A retirement show was held on May 29, 2009, at The Dothan Civic Center where many past stars came out to honor Armstrong before his match in the main event. In 2010, Bob returned to the ring at the "GOTJ 2010" event, where he defeated former rival "Cowboy" Bob Orton Jr.

From 2010 to 2015, Armstrong worked occasional matches around Georgia, mainly working for promotions such as All Pro Wrestling, Superstars Of Wrestling and Combat Sport Pro. Armstrong wrestled his last match on May 11, 2019, for Continental Championship Wrestling in Dothan, Alabama, where he defeated The Assassin.

== Death ==
In March 2020, Armstrong was diagnosed with bone cancer in his ribs, shoulder, and prostate. He refused treatment as he knew the cancer was terminal. He died from complications of bone cancer on August 27, 2020, at the age of 80.

== Championships and accomplishments ==
- Championship Wrestling from Florida
  - NWA Southern Heavyweight Championship (Florida version) (2 times)
- Combat Sport Pro
  - Hall of Fame (Class of 2015)
- Global Championship Wrestling
  - GCW Tag Team Championship (1 time) - with Steve Armstrong
- Memphis Wrestling Hall of Fame
  - Class of 2022
- Mid-South Sports/Georgia Championship Wrestling
  - NWA Columbus Heavyweight Championship (4 times)
  - NWA Columbus Tag Team Championship (1 time) - with Robert Fuller
  - NWA Georgia Tag Team Championship (4 times) - with Dick Steinborn (1) and Robert Fuller (3)
  - NWA Georgia Television Championship (1 time)
  - NWA Macon Heavyweight Championship (3 times)
  - NWA Macon Tag Team Championship (6 times) - with Paul DeMarco (1), El Mongol (1), Bill Dromo (3) and Argentina Apollo (1)
  - NWA National Tag Team Championship (1 time) - with Brad Armstrong
  - NWA Southern Heavyweight Championship (Georgia version) (1 time)
  - NWA Southeastern Tag Team Championship (Georgia version) (4 times) - with El Mongol (1), Bill Dromo (1), and Roberto Soto (2)
- NWA Mid-America
  - NWA Mid-America Heavyweight Championship (2 times)
  - NWA Southern Heavyweight Championship (Memphis version) (3 times)
- NWA Tri-State
  - NWA North American Heavyweight Championship (Tri-State version) (1 time)
- Pro Wrestling Illustrated
  - PWI ranked him No. 272 of the top 500 singles wrestlers in the PWI 500 in 1995
  - PWI ranked him No. 155 of the top 500 singles wrestlers of the PWI Years in 2003
- Southeastern Championship Wrestling
  - CWF Tag Team Championship (1 time) - with Brad Armstrong
  - NWA Alabama Heavyweight Championship (3 times)
  - NWA Southeast Continental Heavyweight Championship (4 times)
  - NWA Southeastern Heavyweight Championship (Northern version) (8 times)
  - NWA Southeastern Heavyweight Championship (Southern Division) (1 time)
  - NWA Six-Man Tag Team Championship (Southeastern version) (1 time) - with Brad Armstrong and Steve Armstrong
  - NWA Southeastern Tag Team Championship (Northern Division) (8 times) - with Ken Lucas (1), Robert Fuller (2), Jos LeDuc (2), Steve Armstrong (1), and Brad Armstrong (2)
  - NWA Southeastern Tag Team Championship (Southern Division) (1 time) - with Robert Fuller
  - NWA Southeastern Television Championship (Southern Division) (1 time)
- Southern Championship Wrestling
  - SCW Heavyweight Championship (1 time)
- USA Wrestling
  - USA Heavyweight Championship (1 time)
- WWE
  - WWE Hall of Fame (Class of 2011)

^{1}Title was awarded to them sometime in 2005 though the records are unclear as to the exact date and which promotion they wrestled in at the time.

== See also ==
List of oldest surviving professional wrestlers
