= Bunkhouse Buck =

American professional wrestler (born 1950)

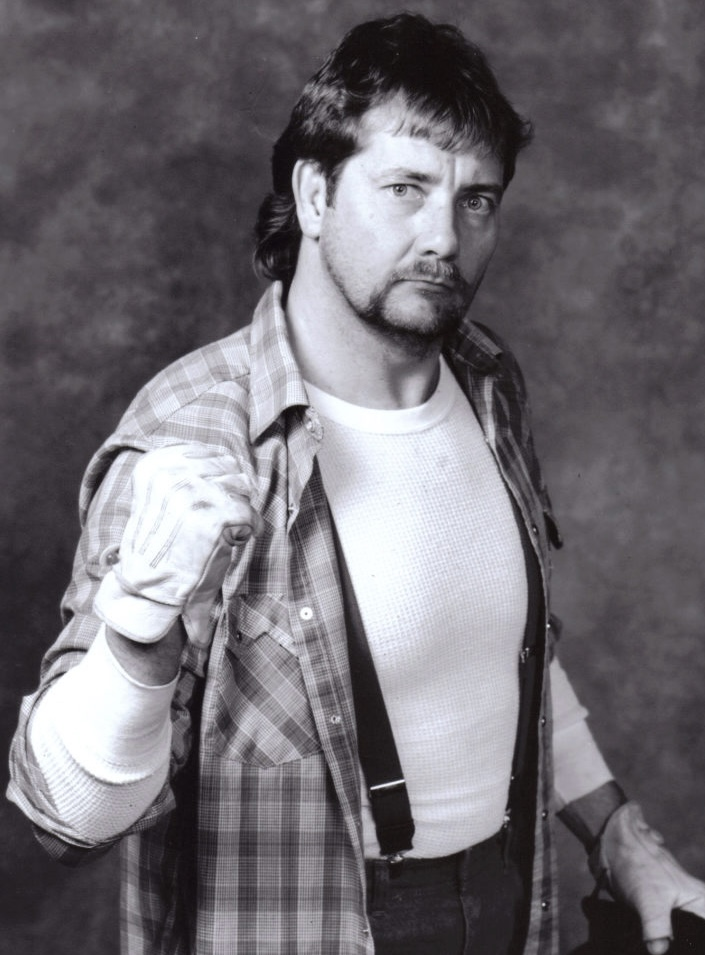

Personal information
- Born: James Golden; August 1, 1950 (age 76) Dyersburg, Tennessee, U.S.
- Relatives: Ron Fuller (cousin); Robert Fuller (cousin); Eddie Golden (nephew); Evan Golden (nephew)

Professional wrestling career
- Ring name(s): Avenger 1 Bunkhouse Buck; Jack Swagger Sr. Jimmy Golden; James Golden
- Billed height: 6 ft 5 in (196 cm)
- Billed weight: 260 lb (118 kg)
- Trained by: Billy Golden; Pancho Villa; Frank Martinez; Lee and Bobby Fields
- Debut: 1968
- Retired: 2020

James Golden (born August 1, 1950) is an American retired professional wrestler. He is best known for his tenure with World Championship Wrestling (WCW) under the ring name Bunkhouse Buck. He also appeared in WWE as Jack Swagger Sr.

A member of the Golden wrestling family, he is the son of Billy Golden and the father of Bobby Golden. Golden's cousins are Robert and Ron Fuller, and he is the uncle of Eddie and Evan Golden. His grandfather is Roy Welch and his uncle is Buddy Fuller.

== Professional wrestling career ==
=== Early career (1968–1975) ===
Jimmy Golden started wrestling in 1968 in his father (Billy Golden)'s territory in Alabama. He started teaming with his cousin Robert Fuller in the 1970s. Golden also wrestled in the early 1970s in Australia for Jim Barnett.

=== Southeastern Championship Wrestling / Continental Championship Wrestling (1975–1987) ===
Jimmy Golden and Robert Fuller were members of the Stud Stable, managed by Ron Fuller in Southeastern Championship Wrestling, later Continental Championship Wrestling, throughout the early 1980s. He was heel most of the time, while his cousins occasionally were face. Pensacola, Florida and Mobile, Alabama were his stomping grounds in the early 1980s. The Stud Stable under Robert Fuller performed in the CWA in Memphis in 1988-1989. Among their feuds during this time were The Rock 'n' Roll Express, Steve Armstrong and Tracy Smothers, Tommy and Johnny Rich and Kerry and Kevin Von Erich. He also teamed with Dennis Hall as "The Avengers" in the early 1970s.

In 1982, Golden briefly worked for Joe Blanchard's Southwest Championship Wrestling.

=== Various promotions (1988–1990) ===
Between 1988 and 1990, Golden wrestled for promotions including the American Wrestling Association and the Continental Wrestling Association.

=== Smoky Mountain Wrestling (1991–1994) ===
He joined the newly founded Smoky Mountain Wrestling in 1991. He competed at the Volunteer Slam tournament on May 22, 1992 in Knoxville for the company's heavyweight championship, but was eliminated by Robert Gibson in the first round. .

=== World Championship Wrestling (1994–1997) ===
In 1994, Golden followed Fuller to World Championship Wrestling (WCW) where Fuller was the manager "Col. Rob Parker" and wrestled for him as Bunkhouse Buck. He feuded mainly with Dustin Rhodes and then teamed with Dick Slater to win the WCW World Tag Team Titles.

=== Late career (1997–2020) ===
Golden appeared on the July 16, 2010, episode of WWE SmackDown, portraying the character of Jack Swagger's father as an alibi to prove his Kayfabe son innocence of attacking The Undertaker, and Swagger abandoned him to be chokeslammed and tombstoned by Kane. He returned on the September 3, episode of SmackDown, reprising his role as Jack Swagger's father, and was again left by Swagger to be attacked by Montel Vontavious Porter.

On August 30, 2011 in New Tazewell, Tennessee, Golden became the Tennessee Mountain Wrestling Heavyweight Champion.

He retired completely from wrestling in 2020.

== Championships and accomplishments ==
- All-American Wrestling
  - AAW Tag Team Championship (1 time) – with Wild Samoan
- All-Star Championship Wrestling
  - ASCW Heavyweight Championship (4 times)
  - ASCW Tag Team Championship (2 times) – with Thad Clark and Keith Hart
- Cajun Wrestling Federation
  - CWF Heavyweight Championship (1 time)
- Capital Pro Wrestling
  - CPW Tag Team Championship (1 time) - with The Gladiator
- Continental Wrestling Federation
  - CWF Tag Team Championship (2 times) - with The Mongolian Stomper (1) and Brian Lee (1)
- Championship Wrestling from Florida
  - NWA Florida Tag Team Championship (1 time) – with Ron Fuller
- George Tragos/Lou Thesz Professional Wrestling Hall of Fame
  - Lou Thesz Award 2026 – with the Welch/Fuller Family
- Georgia Championship Wrestling
  - NWA Macon Tag Team Championship (1 time) – with Robert Fuller
- Heartland Wrestling Association
  - HWA Barroom Brawl Championship (1 time)
- Iron Ring Wrestling
  - IRW Tag Team Championship (1 time) – with Eddie Golden
- Mid-Atlantic Championship Wrestling^{[a]}
  - NWA Mid-Atlantic Heavyweight Championship (1 time)
- Nationwide Championship Wrestling
  - NCW Heavyweight Championship (1 time)
- NWA Mid-America / Continental Wrestling Association
  - CWA Tag Team Championship (2 times) – with Robert Fuller
  - NWA Southern Tag Team Championship (Mid-America version) (1 time) – with Buddy Rose
  - NWA Tri-State Heavyweight Championship (Alabama version) (1 time)
  - NWA Tri-State Tag Team Championship (Alabama version) (1 time) – with Ramon Perez
  - NWA World Tag Team Championship (Mid-America Version) (2 times) – with Dennis Hall
- NWA Rocky Top
  - NWA Rocky Top Heavyweight Championship (1 time)
- Premiere Championship Wrestling
  - PCW Heavyweight Championship (1 time)
- Pro Wrestling Illustrated
  - Ranked No. 117 of the top 500 singles wrestlers of the year in the PWI 500 in 1995
- Southeastern Championship Wrestling
  - NWA Alabama Heavyweight Championship (1 time)
  - NWA Southeastern Heavyweight Championship (Northern Division) (8 times)
  - NWA Southeastern Tag Team Championship (15 times) – with Robert Fuller (7), Ricky Gibson (2), Rip Smith (1), Norvel Austin (1), Bob Roop (1), Randy Rose (1), Mongolian Stomper (1), and Brian Lee (1)
  - NWA Southeastern United States Junior Heavyweight Championship (2 times)
  - NWA Tennessee Tag Team Championship (1 time) – with Ricky Gibson
- Southern Championship Wrestling
  - SCW Southern Heavyweight Championship (1 time)
- Southern States Wrestling
  - SSW Heavyweight Championship (1 time)
  - SSW Television Championship (1 time)
  - SSW Tag Team Championship (1 time) – with G.Q. Strattus
- Tennessee Mountain Wrestling
  - TMW Heavyweight Championship (3 times)
- United Atlantic Championship Wrestling
  - UACW Tag Team Championship (1 time) - with Tim Horner
- World Championship Wrestling
  - WCW World Tag Team Championship (1 time) – with Dick Slater
- World Championship Wrestling (Australia)
  - NWA Austra-Asian Tag Team Championship (1 time) – with Austin Idol^{[b]}
- World Class Wrestling Association
  - WCWA World Tag Team Championship (1 time) – with Robert Fuller
- Wrestling Observer Newsletter
  - Worst Tag Team (1995) with Dick Slater

== Notes ==
- ^{a} While this promotion operates out of the same region and uses some of the same regional championships, it isn't the same promotion that was once owned and operated by Jim Crockett, Jr. That Mid-Atlantic promotion was sold to Ted Turner in November 1988 and went on to be renamed World Championship Wrestling.
- ^{b} This promotion has no connection to the World Championship Wrestling promotion formerly owned by Ted Turner and purchased by World Wrestling Entertainment in 2001. It was an NWA affiliated promotion based out of Australia.
