= Steve Lawler (wrestler) =

American professional wrestler (1965–2021)

Personal information
- Born: Steve Gower; January 24, 1965 Buford, Georgia, U.S.
- Died: September 2, 2021 (aged 56) Florida, U.S.
- Website: Official website

Professional wrestling career
- Ring name(s): Steve Lawler; Liberty McCall; The Flame; Adrian Steele; The Brawler
- Billed height: 6 ft 1 in (1.85 m)
- Billed weight: 256 lb (116 kg)
- Billed from: "Anywhere he wants to be!" Atlanta, Georgia
- Trained by: Ricky Lawless; Glenn Holbrook
- Debut: 1984

Steve Gower (January 24, 1965 – September 2, 2021), better known by his ring name Steve "The Brawler" Lawler, was an American professional wrestler and trainer. He was a mainstay of regional and independent promotions in the Southern United States since the early 1980s, especially in Georgia and the Carolinas, having wrestled for Deep South Wrestling, Southern Championship Wrestling, Georgia All-Star Wrestling, North Georgia Wrestling Association, Peach State Wrestling and Dusty Rhodes' Turnbuckle Championship Wrestling. In later years, he appeared with other NWA veterans for the revived Georgia Championship Wrestling.

A noted tag team specialist, he was a member of the original Bad Company with John Michaels and The Nightmare, a popular "heel" group in the mid-to late 1980s, as well as successful runs with Dennis Gale, Dino Minelli, Bulldog Raines and younger brother Terry Lawler. One of the first students ever trained by Glenn Holbrook, Gower became a trainer himself and served as an instructor for the Masked Superstar's wrestling school and the Global Wrestling Federation's training facility. Among his students include Buff Bagwell, Disco Inferno, Murder One, and Terry Lawler.

== Professional wrestling career ==
=== Early career (1984–1986) ===
A native of Buford, Georgia, Steve Gower was a lifelong fan of professional wrestling and had wanted to become a wrestler as early as 13 years old. As a teenager, he entered and won several toughman contests in Dothan, Alabama. In 1984, a local wrestler out of Macon offered to train him as a professional wrestler, however, Gower later claimed that the veteran wrestler "took my money" and "taught me everything to do wrong." It was after his initial match in Griffin, Georgia, which he later referred to as "a complete disaster", that he was approached by Glenn Holbrook in the dressing room after the show. Seeing potential in the 19-year-old, he invited Gower to train with him. He spent every day for the next 15 weeks working out with Holbrook before he went on the road.

Gower briefly toured Florida, where he wrestled on television as "Adrian Steele", and where he was first given the name Steve "The Brawler" Lawler. Gower would also fill in for masked wrestlers, most notably The Flame. He soon formed a tag team with "Cowboy" Dennis Gale and traveled to various NWA territories and "outlaw" promotions in the South and East Coast. He later claimed that many opponents would refuse to wrestle them, or not show up at all, because of their stiff wrestling style. Charlie Smith, a popular Georgia wrestler in the 1960s and 1970s, once told him he was "the only man he'd ever known who would go to jail for the business." Meeting with Buddy Landell in Atlanta during the mid-1980s, Landell offered to bring him in to WCW, but Gower declined, not willing to be under contract to the organization.

Around this time, Steve Kyle (the original "Steve "The Brawler" Lawler"), was wrestling in the Gulf Coast and Memphis territories though the two should not be confused.

=== Deep South Wrestling (1986–1988) ===
In 1986, Gower began wrestling for Jody Hamilton's Deep South Wrestling where he feuded with Crazy Luke Graham over the promotion's "brass knuckles" championship. Though a fan favorite while wrestling against Graham, he turned "heel" shortly after defeating him for the title. It was also around this time that he joined the original Bad Company, a three-man tag team similar to The Fabulous Freebirds, with John Michaels and The Nightmare and were successful in the region during the mid-to late 1980s. On April 28, 1987, he and The Nightmare wrestled the Rock n' Roll Rebels (Greg Evans & Richard Sartain) at a benefit show for Ware County High School in Waycross, Georgia. The trio also battled "Wildfire" Tommy Rich, Johnny Rich, and Ricky Morton in the spring of 1988, their matches later being aired on the nationally syndicated program "Pro Wrestling This Week." One of his matches against Tommy Rich was later featured on "Blood Battles of the South" highlighting the former NWA World Heavyweight Champion's "bloodiest grudge matches."

=== Southern Championship Wrestling (1988–1990) ===
While working for Hamilton, Gower also started competing in Southern Championship Wrestling and began competing there full-time following the close of DSW. During his time in the promotion, he formed a popular tag team with Dino Minelli known as "Thunder and Lightning" and twice won the promotion's tag team championship. Their first reign began after defeating Ranger Ross and Joey Maggs for the belts in Alpharetta, Georgia on October 23, 1988, and held the titles for two months before being defeated by Ross and Mr. Wrestling II in Atlanta on December 30, 1988. In their second and final championship reign, with manager Sir Samuel F. Kent, a feud with Georgia Power (Nightmare Ted Allen & Jimmy Powell) would end with their losing the titles to them in 1989. The two were compared to the Rock 'n' Roll Express and similar teams at one time for their "chemistry and ability in the ring", however, their partnership ended in a bitter break up.

=== Independent circuit (1991–1999) ===
Gower continued wrestling throughout the Southern independent circuit, where he built a reputation through memorable performances and gaining invaluable in-ring experience. During this period, he faced a number of respected veterans and notable competitors, including Ray Candy, Randy Rose, Mr. Wrestling II, Dick Slater, Ken Timbs, Mike Golden, Abdullah the Butcher, The Bullet, and Scott Studd, among others.

One of the top stars for Joe Pedicino's Georgia All-Star Wrestling, Gower won the GASW Heavyweight Championship from Nick Busick in Carrollton on December 2, 1990, and held the title for over four months before dropping the title to Joel Deaton in Canton, Georgia on April 21, 1991. He also ran a wrestling school during this period for the Masked Superstar, and later the Global Wrestling Federation's training facility, where he trained a number of wrestlers including Marcus Alexander Bagwell, Disco Inferno, Murder One and his younger brother, Terry Lawler. Bagwell, wrestling under the name "The Fabulous Fabian", defeated Gower for the GASW (North Georgia) Television Championship in his first professional match.

On September 15, 1991, Gower faced his former student a second time at an interpromotional show in Marietta, Georgia between the Global Wrestling Federation, where Bagwell was now wrestling as "The Handsome Stranger", and Georgia All-Star Wrestling which he lost to Bagwell via disqualification.

Gower continued his long-running feud against Tommy Rich in GASW, helped by manager Dave Prazak, where the two had several wild brawls. Prazak later claimed that during one of their encounters, in which Rich put Prazak in a piledriver, "both he and Steve Lawler were roaring drunk for that match." They would eventually meet in a "lights out" match at Douglasville, Georgia with the loser being forced to retire. Gower himself later said the greatest matches he ever had were against Rich calling them "some of the bloodiest, they were some of the hardest, and I have a lot of respect for Rich to this day."

With the end of the NWA territory system, Gower remained in Georgia working for independent promotions such as Peach State Wrestling (1991–95), shortly after it began bringing in SCW stars for its televised matches, and the North Georgia Wrestling Association (1992–97). Shortly before the latter promotion's close, he and Bubba Humphries won the NGWA Tag Team Championship from Kenny and John Arden and held them for less than a month before dropping the belts back to the Ardens in Rome on April 19, 1996. He also wrestled and lost to Kenny Arden in a singles match on May 18, 1996. A year later, Gower won the NGWA Heavyweight Championship and remained champion until the promotion's close at the end of the year. He also spent some time in the North American Wrestling Alliance and appeared at its supercard "The Crime in College Park" where he faced his old ally, "The Nightmare" Ted Allen on February 12, 1999.

=== Turnbuckle Championship Wrestling (2000–2001) ===
In 2000, he joined Dusty Rhodes' short-lived Turnbuckle Championship Wrestling. He was one of its few major stars not affiliated with either Extreme Championship Wrestling or World Championship Wrestling. He appeared as "Desperado" Liberty McCall on "Halloween Horror Slam 1", its first television taping, against Jason Holton though negative fan reaction caused the promotion to change it back to his old "Brawler" ring name. On February 18, 2001, at its "TCW vs. ECW" supercard, Gower teamed with Erik Watts in the main event to wrestle Rhodes and a mystery partner. The match was one of several on "Best of Dusty Rhodes - Living The American Dream" released by RF Video on VHS. He met Rhodes again three months later, this time with partner Scott Hall, in a tag team match in Dothan, Alabama with Larry Zbyszko which they lost. He was also on the losing end of a 6-man tag team match with Ron Studd and Barry Windham at TCW's "Woodstock Show", on December 7, 2001, when they were disqualified in their match to Dusty Rhodes, Bob Armstrong and Larry Zbyzsko.

=== Semi-retirement (2001–2004) ===
Gower eventually left pro wrestling to work for a building supply company, and later with a major motorcycle distributor, Greg and Lori Becker's Stone Mountain Harley-Davidson, though he continued to make occasional appearances on the Georgia "indy circuit" for a number of years. On November 29, 2002, he and his old tag team partner Dennis Gale reunited for a Peach State Wrestling reunion show, held at the Lions Club Fairgrounds in Cordele, Georgia, where they wrestled "Wildfire" Tommy Rich and Mr. Hughes in the main event. "Bullet" Bob Armstrong was originally scheduled to serve as the special guest referee however he was forced to drop out after being injured in an attack by Erik Watts earlier in the show. Other wrestlers on the card included Vordell Walker, Scott Armstrong, Marty Jannetty, Bambi, Leilani Kai, Jorge Estrada, Sonny Siaki, Ray Lloyd, Scotty Riggs, and Thunderbolt Patterson. He also made a brief appearance for NAWA Ring Champions. On April 17, 2004, he was scheduled to wrestle Tommy Rich but instead tricked the younger Seth Cruise into taking his place. He returned for two more appearances defeating Johnny Grunge on May 15 and, at its "Spring Stampede" supercard, his brother Terry Lawler in a Rome Street Fight on May 29, 2004. All three shows were held at Dillard's Music Park in Rome, Georgia.

=== Return to the Georgia "indy circuit" (2008–2009) ===
After an absence of several years, Gower came out of retirement losing over thirty pounds to get in shape for his return. By 2008, he was wrestling for both NAWA Ring Champions, for which he served as booker at times, and Southern Extreme Championship Wrestling. On January 6, 2008, at SECW's "Bill Dromo Appreciation Night" in Carrollton, he wrestled in a 6-man tag team match with Chick Donovan and Bulldog Raines against Bob Armstrong, Tommy Rich, and Buff Bagwell, losing when his team was disqualified. On February 7, a tag team match with Bulldog Raines against Tommy Rich and Jimmy Powell in Rome for NAWA Ring Champions ended in a double-disqualification. He and Raines lost a match in SECW against Bull Buchanan and Buff Bagwell three days later.

The two split up after their most recent loss and were on opposing sides the following week when he and his new partner, The Super Destroyer, beat Bull Buchanan and Bulldog Raines via disqualification. In SECW, Gower later challenged Raines for the SECW Heavyweight Championship.

The two were back together again in NAWA Ring Champions days later to wrestle Tommy Rich and Kenny Arden in Rome, but fought each other at NAWA's next show on March 13, another tag team match, pitting Steve & Terry Lawler against Bulldog Raines & the Nightmare. Both Lawler and Raines were still being managed by Jackie Rosedale. At another NAWA house show, headlined by Bambi versus Peggy Lee Leather, in Cedarsburg on April 4 he appeared with Ricky Morton, Bobby Eaton, and Chick Donovan. Two weeks later he wrestled Tommy Rich in a "bounty" match in Carrollton.

On May 3, 2008, Gower was yet again among the Southern legends, such as Tommy Rich, Dennis Condrey and The Nightmare, invited to participate in AWA World-1 South's "Southern Clash" supercard in Cordele, Georgia. Though the majority took part on the "AWA Legends vs. Georgia Legends" main event, he wrestled The Nightmare, in a "special attraction match." The event also included the AWA's Larry Zbyszko and Jake Milliman & Frankie DeFalco, as well as younger independent wrestlers Ricky Landell, Kirby Mack, Chasyn Rance, Brian Logan, Ron Niemi, and The Heartbreak Express (Sean and Phil Davis).

==== Georgia Wrestling Promotions incident (2008) ====
In early 2008, Gower was among a number of wrestlers booked to wrestle an event in Woodstock, Georgia for Georgia Wrestling Promotions. The card advertised Gower and Terry Lawler to face Hot Like Lava (Cru Jones & Shawn Banks) in the main event and was to include a 20-man Battle Royal, with the final two men facing each other to determine the new GWP Champion on June 1, and appearances from Tommy Rich, Masked Superstar, and former students Buff Bagwell and Murder One.

The event experienced a number of problems both prior to and during the show. The promotion's owner, Roger Cantrell, had been hospitalized due to cellulitis related to his diabetes around this time and contracted pneumonia during his stay. He was later diagnosed with kidney failure and put on dialysis. Despite his poor health, and disregarding advice that he cancel the event, Cantrell provided the card for the upcoming show in Woodstock direct from his bed at Northside Cherokee Hospital.

Advertising for the show was not distributed until the three days before the show, contributing to its low attendance, and Cantrell had to personally call wrestlers who had been prematurely told the event was going to be cancelled. On the night of the show, at the Hot Wheels Skate Center, the building's manager informed the arriving wrestlers that she would not allow the show to take place because the promotion already owed her $500 for a bounced check received for a previous show in January, another $100 she loaned Cantrell to pay talent, in addition to $500 for that night's show. Cantrell was not at the building that night, instead at his home recovering from his hospital stay, and so Gower talked with the manager instead. She agreed to allow the show to continue provided Hot Wheels would receive the gate receipts, presumably the first $1100, to recoup the money Cantrell owed her. As GWP typically paid its talent with the gate receipts it was expected that the wrestlers would be paid with what was left. Less than 20 people were in attendance at bell time (7:30 pm), far less than expected, and none of the wrestlers were to receive payment for their appearance. Masked Superstar, Tommy Rich, Cru Jones, Terry Lawler and Gower all left before their matches and Murder One was forced to rebook the show at the last minute with the remaining wrestlers.

Gower, upset by the experience, posted a message criticizing the promotion on his website shortly after what would be its final show;

GEORGIA W_______ PROMOTIONS, DON'T CALL IT WRESTLING !!

In the many years, Steve Lawler has been wrestling. He has come into contact with numerous wrestling promoters and federations. The Brawler would like to think that he has acted professional in the ring and behaved professionally with other promoters in negotiations.

This brings me to the subject of Georgia Wrestling Promotions (GWP). That will be the last time you see the word "Wrestling" in that phrase. In the twenty plus years "The Brawler" has been in the business, He has never been treated so poorly by any federation as he was treated by GWP. The promoter of this group should be embarrassed to call himself a promoter or to pretend he is in the wrestling business. It is enough to make Steve Lawler embarrassed to be in the wrestling business.

It is a shame that any guy can come out of the crowd and pass himself off as a promoter without having any respect for the business. If you pass bounced checks or don't take care of the building prior to your next show, you are a damned fool. It is damned insulting to disrespect legends of the sport like Masked Superstar and Tommy Rich. How can an asshole like this expect wrestlers to show up for his shows when he is pulling stunts like this? How can wrestlers work for a person with no respect for good business practices and when you know he is screwing your brothers in the dressing room (You know he will screw you over next!!!) ?

This promoter is a piece of shit. I am warning all my brothers in the business to stay away from this group. I would strongly encourage someone in this group to step up and make things right with those who have been cheated.

If you don't have the money or know how to promote, Buy a damn ticket!!!

=== Later years (2010–2021) ===
On June 1, 2010, Gower was a guest on the internet radio program "The Dave & Danger Show" with Dave Wills and Mark Danger during which he discussed his training and early career, friendships with many Southern wrestlers (including road stories with Tommy Rich), and promoted an upcoming benefit show, "Legends of Wrestling", to raise money for Breast Cancer Network of Strength. He was particularly critical of the modern wrestling industry, such as the use of the six-sided "octagon"-like ring used by Total Nonstop Action Wrestling, the breaking of "kayfabe", and the shift away from "traditional" wrestling to sports entertainment. He also spoke out against efforts by the Georgia Wrestling Commission to regulate pro wrestling in his home state and expressed interest in holding a special wrestling show to recognize Georgia's legendary wrestling personalities.

The "Legends of Wrestling" show took place three days later at an outdoor concert held at the Granite Mountain Harley-Davidson dealership, celebrating its 6th anniversary, in Conyers, Georgia. A portion of the proceeds went to raising funds for breast cancer patients and family support. Among the performers at the event included Abdullah the Butcher, Randy Rose, Steve and Terry Lawler, and the masked Original Assassin.

Gower was also present at an event for Purks International Championship Wrestling a week later, where Terry Lawler was wrestling in a 6-man tag team match, although Gower did not take part in the show.

On February 12, 2011, Gower reunited with his old Bad Company tag team partner, Jon Michaels, at A Nightmare To Remember, to take on Joel Deaton and Mr. Atlanta Villa Rica Street Fight in the main event. A memorial show for "The Nightmare" Ted Allen, Bad Company was accompanied by Allen's old partner The Nightmare II of the Masked Nightmares.

During the summer of 2011, Gower appeared with other Georgia legends for Georgia Championship Wrestling which had been recently revived by promoter Grady Odom. On its June 30 show in Phenix City, he appeared alongside Abdullah the Butcher, Joel Deaton, Ricky Morton, and Bob & Brad Armstrong, where he wrestled Vordell Walker. He was scheduled to meet Walker two months later at GCW's "Invasion" supercard in Macon, Georgia but this was later changed to a tag team match between him and Billy Black against Tony Atlas and Tommy Rich. The four wrestled for 12 minutes until referee Keith Steinborn saw Black hit Atlas with his cowbell causing their disqualification.

In July 2012, Gower appeared on the Wrestle Rock event taking place in Covington Georgia. The event which featured Rock & Roll Express' Robert Gibson, cage matches, street fights, a live band and women's matches. Gower tagged with local personality Bam Bam against Lee Brock and Chris Nelms in a steel cage street fight match.

=== The Brawler's Last Ride Tour (2012–2013) ===
The Brawler's retirement kicked off in late 2012 and was set to run up to the third annual Nightmare to Remember event taking place in Villa Rica, Georgia on February 16, 2013, in which Steve Lawler would wrestle in his final match. On Christmas night 2012, Lawler and younger brother Terry wrestled for Georgia All-Star Wrestling as part of Steve's retirement tour against local team "The Best of the Best". On February 2, 2013, Lawler tagged again with brother Terry at PCW in Porterdale, Georgia against "Worst Case Scenario". Later in the evening on February 2 while set to compete at NSCW in Covington, Georgia, Steve Lawler was presented with an award for three decades of service in the wrestling business. The Lawler brothers and Bam Bam faced Alex Brock, Chris Nelms & Demarko Knight in a 6-man match. On February 16, 2013 at the 3rd annual Nightmare to Remember event, Lawler along with Grizzly Boone and manager John Michaels (all members of the original Bad Company) took part in and won his official retirement match against the Pretty Young Things (Fredrick & James) with manager Phil Hefner.

== Death ==
Gower died on September 2, 2021, at the age of 56. He had been hospitalized at a Florida hospital for nearly two weeks suffering from COVID-19 and pneumonia symptoms while on a ventilator.

== Championships and accomplishments ==
- Deep South Wrestling
  - DSW Brass Knucks Championship (1 time)
- Georgia All-Star Wrestling
  - GASW Heavyweight Championship (1 time)
  - GASW Television Championship (1 time)
- North American Wrestling Association
  - NAWA Heavyweight Championship (1 time)
- North Georgia Wrestling Association
  - NGWA Heavyweight Championship (1 time, last)
  - NGWA Tag Team Championship (1 time) - with Bubba Humphries
- Pro Wrestling Illustrated
  - PWI ranked him #341 of the top 500 singles wrestlers in the PWI 500 in 1992
  - PWI ranked him #333 of the top 500 singles wrestlers in the PWI 500 in 1991
- Southern Championship Wrestling
  - SCW Tag Team Championship (2 times) - with Dino Minelli
