= A Nightmare To Remember =

Annual professional wrestling memorial event

A Nightmare to Remember
- Promotion: LN Promotions
- Date: 2011-2012
- City: Villa Rica, Georgia
- Venue: Bay Springs Middle School
- Attendance: 650 (2011); 500 (2012)
- Tagline: "The Ted Allen Memorial - A Nightmare To Remember"

A Nightmare To Remember is annual professional wrestling memorial event produced by the LN Promotions promotion with shows in 2011 and 2012, in memory of "The Nightmare" Ted Allen, a popular masked wrestler during the 1980s and an icon on the Georgia independent circuit, who died from a heart attack at his home in Cartersville, Georgia on August 19, 2010.

== The events ==
The proceeds from the event were donated to Allen's mother, Karen Allen, and the Gulf Coast Wrestlers Reunion's "Ted Allen Sunshine Fund". The inaugural show raised over $6,500. Additional concessions sales went towards Bay Springs Middle School in Villa Rica, Georgia.

In addition to paying tribute to Allen's career and contributions to pro wrestling, the event also served as a reunion show for wrestlers of the Southern United States, especially for former stars of the Georgia and Gulf Coast wrestling territories, with wrestlers coming from as far away as Alabama, the Carolinas, Mississippi, Tennessee, and Texas to participate in the event. The original memorial show featured "Cowboy" Bob Kelly, Joyce Grable, Doug Somers, Brad Armstrong, Keith Steinborn, Charlie Smith, Curtis Smith, Sgt. Buddy Lee Parker, and Gene Lavelle. The special guests were officially introduced by Dave Wills, co-host of "The Dave & Danger Show", and who gained infamy on the internet as the "crying wrestling fan", serving as the official ring announcer. Also in attendance were former World Championship Wrestling commentators Scott Hudson and Steven Prazak, Peachstate Wrestling Alliance promoter Shane Noles, Georgia Championship Wrestling promoter Grady Odom, Platinum Championship Wrestling promoter Stephen Platinum, co-host of Peach State Pandemonium radio show Mike Norris (with Bobby Simmons and Jerry Oates), and wrestlers Fred Avery, Mike Golden, Hacksaw Higgins, Bulldog Raines, and "Dirty White Boy" Jimmy Powell. The main event was a Villa Rica Street Fight, billed as a "SCW Classic Match-Up", between the Original Bad Company (Steve Lawler & John Michaels) and Joel Deaton & Mr. Atlanta, which Lawler and Michaels won. Allen's old tag team partner, The Nightmare II of The Masked Nightmares, came out of retirement to be in Bad Company's corner. In the semi-main event, Kyle Matthews defeated Brad Armstrong. A 20-man "Nightmare" battle royal, won by George South, was also featured on the card.

The second show had Bill Dundee, Robert Gibson, Thunderbolt Patterson, Nick Busick, Randy Rose, Jerry Stubbs, Mac McMurray, Scotty Riggs, Jim Bryant, Levi Banks, Greg Evans, Jack Lord, Ron East, Gene Bennett, Miss Fifi, Burger Powell, Ranger Ross, and stand-up comedian James Gregory. The main event saw Kyle Matthews pin Jimmy Rave while Frankie Valentine defeated Chip Day, Epic Grant Mitchell, Joey Kidman, Lamar Philips, Josh Storm, and Stupid (with Tweety) in a 7-way elimination match. Hillbilly Festus won the 20-man "Nightmare" battle royal by eliminating The Russian Assassin (Ken Timbs, Jr.); outside the ring were special guest referees Ron West, Charlie Smith, Scrappy McGowan, and Bobby Simmons who refereed for Georgia Championship Wrestling during the 1970s and 80s.

The event was covered by WXIA in Atlanta. Terry Lawler, credited as "the driving force behind the event", was voted by his peers to receive the Ted Allen Mentorship Award (2011) from the GeorgiaWrestlingHistory.com website. In a live report of the final "Nightmare To Remember", Larry Goodman of GWH.com praised the event calling it "a sweet show, befitting the man it honored" with the event "filled with laughter and warm feelings, both in the arena and in the locker room".

== Show results ==
=== A Nightmare To Remember ===
February 12, 2011 in Villa Rica, Georgia (Bay Springs Middle School)

No.	Results	Stipulations	Duration
1	George South defeated 19 other participants by last eliminating Epic Grant (Note: The other participants included were: J.W. Christian, Doc Heyward, Brad Lynch, Pretty Boy Floyd, Al Horne, Seth Cruise, Shaun Banks, T.J. Gray, Jay Clinton, Ken Timbs Jr., Sal Rinauro, Epic Grant, Keith Steinborn, Bobby Wilson, Jake Manning, Inmate Spike, The Great Yugo, and The Nightmare II.)	Twenty-man battle royal	16:05
2	Team Extreme (Terry Lawler and Air Paris) (with CC Devlin) defeated The Tennessee Bad Boys (David Young and Bobby Hayes)	Tag Team match	13:30
3	Sal Rinauro, Billy Knight, and The Patriot defeated Jimmy Rave, Sgt. Buddy Lee Parker, and Jamie Holmes	Six-man tag team match	10:45
4	Bambi and Lee Thomas defeated Peggy Lee Leather and Todd Zane (with Joyce Grable)	Mixed tag team match	18:00
5	Chip Day defeated Frankie Valentine, Josh Storm, The Exotic Ones (Simon Sermon and Rick Michaels), Thunder & Lightning (Chris Ganz and Chris Lightning), and Stupid (with Tweety)	8-way elimination match	18:40
6	Kyle Matthews defeated Brad Armstrong	Standard wrestling match	12:50
7	Original Bad Company (Steve Lawler and John Michaels) (with The Nightmare II) defeated Joel Deaton and Mr. Atlanta	Villa Rica Street Fight	8:40

=== A Nightmare To Remember II ===
February 11, 2012 in Villa Rica, Georgia (Bay Springs Middle School)

No.	Results	Stipulations	Duration
1	Hillbilly Festus defeated 20 other participants by last eliminating The Russian Assassin (Note: The other participants included were: Jamie Holmes (with Ragdoll Jessestar), Shane Williams, Brandon Kage, Dave Diamond, Eddie Wilson, The Patriot, The Great Yugo, Vic Roze, Seth Cruise, Kadien Knight, Dark Gable, The Convicts (Blade and Snake), Papa Billy's Boys (The Freak and JW Christian), Greg Brown, Crusher Rick Knopf, Todd Zane, Chris Nelms, Fred Avery, and George South. The match was officiated by special guest referees Ron West, Charlie Smith, Scrappy McGowan and Bobby Simmons - former referees for Georgia Championship Wrestling during the 1970s and 80s - who remained outside the ring during the bout.)	Twenty-man battle royal	N/A
2	Big Wood, Billy Knight, and The Patriot (with Miss Fifi) defeated Bobby Hayes, Todd Zane, and Brad Lynch	Six-man tag team match	13:14
3	Beau James, Misty James, and Awesome TC defeated Pretty Boy Floyd, Scott Prater, and Sabrina (with Joyce Grable)	Mixed six-person tag team match	11:52
4	C.C. Develine defeated Michael Cross	"Student vs. Teacher" match	13:15
5	Nick Busick, Terry Lawler, and Steve Lawler defeated The Russian Assassin and The Convicts (Blade and Snake) (with Phil Heffner)	Six-man tag team match	17:38
6	Frankie Valentine defeated Chip Day, Grant Mitchell, Joey Kidman, Lamar Philips, Josh Storm, and Stupid (with Tweety)	7-way elimination match	13:35
7	Kyle Matthews defeated Jimmy Rave	Standard wrestling match	17:57

== See also ==
- List of professional wrestling memorial shows
