= Southern Championship Wrestling (Georgia) =

US wrestling promotion

- Acronym: SCW
- Founded: 1988
- Defunct: 1990
- Style: Rasslin'
- Headquarters: Marietta, Georgia
- Founder: Jerry Blackwell
- Owner(s): Jerry Blackwell (1988–1990); Joe Pedicino (1990–1991)
- Parent: American Wrestling Association (1988–1990)
- Formerly: AWA Georgia

Southern Championship Wrestling (SCW) was a professional wrestling promotion that was founded in Marietta, Georgia by Jerry Blackwell and operated from 1988 to 1990, and was continued by his successor, Joe Pedicino, who ran the promotion as Georgia All-Star Wrestling for another year.

Though short-lived, the group showcased some of the top talent from the American Wrestling Association and National Wrestling Alliance as well as notable on-air talent including Pedicino, Rick Stewart, Rhubarb Jones, Paul Heyman, and booker Buck Robley. It was one of the top independent organizations in Georgia during the late-1980s, rivaling Jody Hamilton's Deep South Wrestling, and the state's last territory-era promotion prior to the collapse of the NWA territory system.

== History ==
Southern Championship Wrestling was established in Georgia by Jerry Blackwell in early 1988. Blackwell, then a star in American Wrestling Association, had run shows under the "AWA Georgia" banner the previous year using talent from the AWA. One of its biggest shows was held at the Cobb Civic Center in Marietta and was headlined by Blackwell, Wahoo McDaniel, Sgt. Slaughter, The Iron Sheik, Curt Hennig, Jerry "The King" Lawler, and The Midnight Express (Dennis Condrey and Randy Rose). Condrey and Rose were scheduled to appear in SCW as the AWA World Tag Team Champions, however, the angle was dropped when Condrey was unable to appear. His place was taken by Comrade Busich and introduced by their manager, Paul E. Dangerously, as "Ravishing Randy and Comrade Busich, the substitute Midnight Express."

Blackwell eventually began promoting on a full-time basis with involvement from Joe Pedicino and others. The first events and TV tapings were held in January 1988; the second TV taping (January 24) was headlined by Bruiser Brody and drew 630 fans. Matches from these shows were first shown on a weekly syndicated TV program, Southern Championship Wrestling from Georgia, which aired live on certain TV stations. Dave Meltzer of the Wrestling Observer called these first tapings "a pretty lively and fun to watch indy show, and has better caliber wrestling than most indies". The first Southern Heavyweight Champion, "Gentleman" Chris Adams, won the championship by defeating Buck Robley in a tournament final on June 25, 1988, in Columbus, Georgia. The first Southern Tag Team Champions were crowned in a tournament final that same year in Macon, when "Wildfire" Tommy Rich and Ted Oates defeated Bob Orton, Jr. and "Dirty" Dick Slater. The show was taped mostly at Miss Kitty's in Marietta as well as occasional shows at The Memorial Gym in Rome, Georgia.

=== Territorial reach ===
Given the constraints of the NWA territory system, with the Southeast controlled by Jim Crockett Promotions, and the national expansion of World Wrestling Federation now in full swing, there was little opportunity for SCW to develop a larger territory of its own. The promotion was mostly limited to the southern Georgia area with regular shows in cities such as Alpharetta, Atlanta, Columbus, Griffin, Macon and Marietta, Georgia; most of its television tapings took place at Gordon Clements' Alpharetta Auction Barn and Miss Kitty's Saloon in Marietta. Within its first three months, SCW was running between five and seven shows every two weeks and sold out shows in Marietta on at least two occasions.

=== Notable talent ===
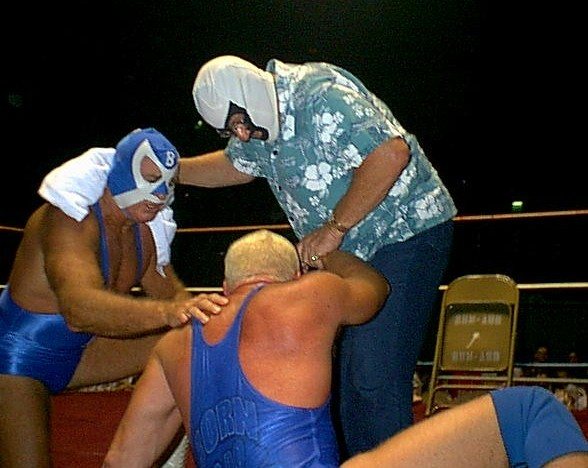
The Bullet (left) and Mr. Wrestling II (right), seen here with Scott Armstrong (center), were among the stars who competed for Southern Championship Wrestling.

With Blackwell's connections to the AWA and, to a certain extent, various NWA members, the promotion sported one of the top rosters in the Georgia independents. Austin Idol, Akio Sato, Bob Orton, Jr., David Sammartino, "Pretty Boy" Doug Somers, "Raging Bull" Manny Fernandez, and Boris Zhukov & Soldat Ustinov were among the AWA veterans who appeared for the promotion in addition to wrestlers from the Central States and Mid-South territories. Other stars included "Outlaw" Joel Deaton, Nick Busick, Ranger Ross, Joey Maggs, and Thunder and Lightning (Steve Lawler and Dino Minelli). SCW held the distinction of airing some of Bruiser Brody's final televised matches before his 1988 murder in Puerto Rico; SCW television footage was used on PWTW's "Bruiser Brody Tribute Show" that fall. Terry Funk and the Von Erich family also made appearances on early TV tapings. Promoter Rex Luther later provided undercard talent as well.

SCW also had important backstage and on-air personnel. Bill Dromo was introduced as the figurehead president. Randy "Pee Wee" Anderson was one of its referees. Rhubarb Jones, a popular morning radio DJ in Atlanta, and Joe Pedicino served as announcers, and were later joined by Rick Stewart from Central States Wrestling. A 22-year-old Paul Heyman, who was also working for Windy City Wrestling in Chicago, appeared as "Paul E. Dangerously" alongside the original Midnight Express (Dennis Condrey and Randy Rose) before moving on to World Championship Wrestling to feud with the Jim Cornette and the "new" Midnight Express (Bobby Eaton and Stan Lane). Most importantly, Buck Robley returned to pro wrestling after a four-year absence to become the promotion's booker. SCW also marked the final appearance of longtime NWA star Mr. Wrestling II who feuded with Robley before retiring in 1989. Their feud began with Robley's surprise debut in the promotion by having himself sealed in a wooden crate and "delivered" to the ring while Mr. Wrestling II was being interview with Joe Pedicino. When the masked wrestler investigated the box, he was attacked by Robley. As booker, Robley introduced other creative ideas such as a "$10,000 Slam Battle Royal" held at the Marietta Civic Center.

=== Rivalry with Deep South Wrestling ===
SCW's talent pool and popular television program, in addition to limited national exposure via Joe Pedicino's Pro Wrestling This Week, saw the promotion quickly rise to the top of the Georgia independent circuit. The number one "outlaw" promotion at the time was Jody Hamilton's Deep South Wrestling out of Marietta. Hamilton and his training facility had a working relationship with Jim Crockett Promotions and enjoyed the use its stars. On the independent scene, both promotions competed for talent and shared many of the same wrestlers. Mr. Wrestling II, for example, jumped back and forth between SCW and DSW during this period.

Within two months of SCW's debut, Dave Meltzer's Wrestling Observer was reporting "a major war" between the two organizations. Deep South Wrestling ran on Channel 69 which was a competitor against the station that aired Pedicino's "Pro Wrestling This Week". The rival station had created its own Saturday night wrestling bloc to compete directly with Pedecino's show, but failed to challenge him in the ratings. For this and other reasons, such as Pedicino airing SCW programming, he and his co-host Boni Blackstone were drawn into the Blackwell-Hamilton war. In February 1988, DSW parodied Pedicino and Blackstone on its television program with the following skit;

On a recent Deep South Wrestling show, they made fun of Joe Pedicino and Bonnie Blackstone. They did a skit with a guy in an easy chair pretending to be Pedicino, but getting stuck in his chair and needing help to get out. Blackstone was parodied as a total bimbo. Southern countered by showing a clip of The Invader vs The Assassin, with Pedicino saying, "This is the Puerto Rican Assassin because there is nobody named The Assassin in the United States that can wrestle," a dig at Jody Hamilton, the group's headliner.

SCW also poked fun at Crockett's promotion on occasion. In an appearance by Michael Hayes of The Fabulous Freebirds, he joked with an SCW crowd "[The NWA] may be the major league, but their checks are minor league." The year-long rivalry between SCW and DSW ended when, following an in-ring injury, Hamilton sold off the promotion in 1988.

=== Demise ===
Blackwell continued to operate SCW throughout the steady decline of the National Wrestling Alliance. By end of the decade, however, the NWA's decades-old territory system had ended while the WWF came to dominate the U.S. wrestling industry. Losing interest in the promotion, Blackwell decided to close down SCW in early 1990. It was the last-ever territory-era promotion to run in the state of Georgia.

== Georgia All-Star Wrestling ==
Shortly after Jerry Blackwell pulled out of SCW, Joe Pedicino decided to continue on by himself. In May 1990, the promotion was relaunched as "Georgia All-Star Wrestling". Though no longer having access to AWA talent, Pedicino was able to bring in former wrestlers from Jim Crockett Promotions as an announcer for the promotion. Future WCW star Marcus Bagwell made his debut in the promotion under the name Fabian. He was also able to retain many of SCW's former Georgia-area stars. These were mostly independent wrestlers such as Jimmy Holiday, Tony Zane, Billy Starr, John Michaels. Joel Deaton, Nick Busich, and Steve "The Brawler" Lawler.

In early 1990, Pedicino hired Scott Hudson and Steve Prazak as announcers for the promotion. According to Hudson in a later interview, both men had been fans of "Pro Wrestling This Week" and impressed Pedicino when they volunteered to replace the regular announcer following a poor performance at an GASW show in Carrollton, Georgia. Initially working without pay, they were eventually hired full-time. With their experience in radio and television, they became valuable members of the promotion. Pedicino continued running GASW until 1991 when he and former USWA commissioner Max Andrews decided to start a new promotion, the Global Wrestling Federation, in Dallas, Texas.

== Alumni ==
=== Male wrestlers ===
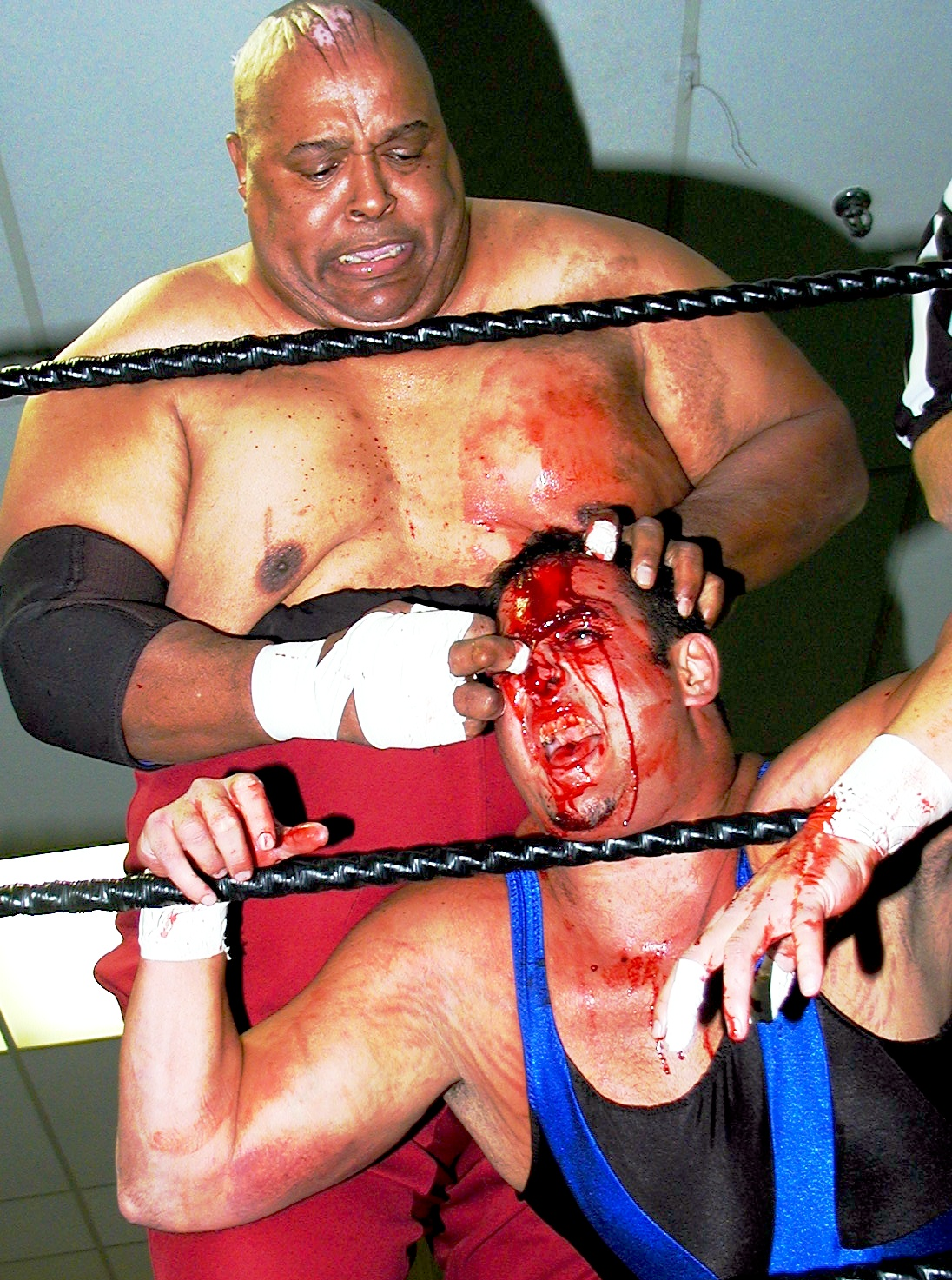
Abdullah the Butcher

Birth name	Ring name(s)	Tenure	Ref
Christopher Adams^{†}	Chris Adams	1988	
Ted Allen^{†}	The Nightmare	1989	
Marcus Bagwell	Fabian	1990–1991	
Jerry Blackwell^{†}	Crusher Blackwell	1988–1990	
Larry Booker^{†}	Moondog Spot	1988	
Phil Buckley^{†}	Buck Robley	1988	
Nicholas Busick^{†}	Nick Busick; Comrade Busich	1988–1991	
Ray Canty^{†}	Kareem Muhammad	1988	
William Cruickshanks	Bill Dundee		
Edward Denton	The Grappler	1988	
Emanuel Fernandez	Manny Fernandez	1988	
Thomas Gilbert Jr.^{†}	Eddie Gilbert	1988	
Frank Goodish^{†}	Bruiser Brody	1988	
Darryl Gower	Steve "The Brawler" Lawler	1988–1991	
Joseph James	The Bullet	1988	
Joseph James Jr.	Scott Armstrong	1988	
Joel Jones	Joel Deaton	1988–1991	
Richard Link	MEB / Man Eating Beast	1988	
Charles Kelley	Chick Donovan	1988	
Joseph Magliano^{†}	Joey Maggs	1988	
James Manley	Jim Powers	1988	
Richard Morton	Ricky Morton	1988	
Robert Orton Jr.	Bob Orton	1988	
Steve Prichard	Steve Prichard	1988	
John Richardson	Johnny Rich	1988	
Thomas Richardson	Tommy Rich	1988	
Robert Ross Jr.	Ranger Ross	1988–1990	
David Sammartino	David Sammartino	1989	
Akio Sato	Akio Sato	1988	
Michael Seitz	Michael Hayes	1988	
Lawrence Shreve	Abdullah the Butcher	1988	
Douglas Somerson	Doug Somers	1988	
Ken Timbs^{†}	Ken Timbs	1988	
Curtis Thompson	Curtis Thompson	1990–1991	
Richard Van Slater	Dick Slater	1988	
John Walker	Mr. Wrestling II	1988	
Tony Zane	Mr. Atlanta	1988–1990	
Unknown	Barry Turner	1988	
Unknown	Billy Black; Fatback Festus	1990–1991	
Unknown	Chris Walker	1990–1991	
Unknown	Chuck McCall	1988	
Unknown	Eddie Sweat	1988	
Unknown	Firewalker	1988	
Unknown	Gerald Finley	1988	
Unknown	Grizzly Boone; Cousin Grizzly	1990–1991	
Unknown	Jamie Kyle	1988	
Unknown	Jim Boss	1988	
Unknown	Jim Bryant	1988	
Unknown	Jimmy Powell	1989	
Unknown	Jon Michaels	1988	
Unknown	Mike Golden	1989	
Unknown	The Red Shadow		
Unknown	Rhama Brown	1988	
Unknown	Steve Bennett	1988	
Unknown	Ted Oates	1988	
Unknown	Terry Leland	1990–1991	
Unknown	Tim Ashley	1988	
Unknown	Wild Bill Smith	1988	

=== Stables and tag teams ===
Tag team/Stable(s)	Members	Tenure(s)
The Batten Twins	Bart Batten and Brad Batten	1988
Blazers	Ray Lloyd and R.D. Swain	1990–1991
Brute Force	Slammer and Jammer	1990–1991
Dixie Mafia	Mike Golden and Big Daddy	1990–1991
Georgia Power	Nightmare Ted Allen and Jimmy Powell	1989
The Hillbillies	Fatback Festus and Cousin Grizzly	1990–1991
The MOD Squad	Basher and Spike	1988–1990
Thunder & Lightning	Steve Lawler and Dino Minelli	1988–1990
The Substitute Midnight Express	Comrade Busich and Randy Rose	1988
PYTs	Fred Avery and James Bryant	1990–1991
Zebra Warriors	Zebra Warrior #1 and Zebra Warrior #2	1988

=== Managers and valets ===
Birth name	Ring name(s)	Tenure	Ref
Phil Buckley^{†}	Buck Robley	1988	
Paul Heyman	Paul E. Dangerously	1988	

=== Commentators and interviewers ===
Birth name	Ring name(s)	Tenure	Ref
Scott Hudson	Scott Hudson	1990–1991	
Warren Jones	Rhubarb Jones	1988	
Rick Stewart	Rick Stewart	1988	
Joe Pedicino	Joe Pedicino	1988–1991	Ring announcer
Steve Prazak	Steve Prazak	1990–1991	

=== Referees ===
Birth name	Ring name(s)	Tenure	Ref
Randy Anderson	Randy "Pee Wee" Anderson	1988	

=== Other personnel ===
Birth name	Ring name(s)	Tenure	Notes
Jerry Blackwell	Jerry Blackwell	1988–1990	Promoter
Phil Buckley^{†}	Buck Robley	1988	Booker
William Dromo	Bill Dromo		President
Joe Pedicino	Joe Pedicino	1988–1991	Promoter

Company name to Year
Company name:	Years:
Southern Championship Wrestling	1988–1990
Georgia All-Star Wrestling	1990–1991
Notes
^{†} Indicates they are deceased.
^{‡} Indicates they died while they were employed with Southern Championship Wrestling.
^{AWA} Indicates they were part of a talent exchange with American Wrestling Association.
^{NWA} Indicates they were part of a talent exchange with National Wrestling Alliance.

== Championships and programming ==
=== Championships ===
Championship	Notes
SCW Heavyweight Championship	The heavyweight title of SCW. It was established in 1988 continued to be defended within the promotion until 1990.
SCW Southern Tag Team Championship	The tag team title of SCW. It was established in 1988 continued to be defended within the promotion until 1990.

=== Programming ===
Programming	Notes
Southern Championship Wrestling from Georgia	(1988–1990) Syndicated, also occasionally broadcast live on certain Georgia stations
