= The Party Patrol =

Tag team
- Members: Johnny Rich; Davey Rich
- Name: The Riches
- Billed heights: 6 ft 1 in (1.85 m) (Johnny); 6 ft 0 in (1.83 m) (Davey)
- Combined billed weight: 486 lb (220 kg)
- Billed from: Nashville, Tennessee
- Debut: 1988
- Disbanded: 1995 (last match)
- Trained by: Tojo Yamamoto; Don Bass

The Party Patrol were a professional wrestling tag team consisting of Johnny Rich (John Richardson) and Davey Rich (Dave Haskins). The team was active from 1988 through 1995. They were billed as cousins to former NWA World Heavyweight Champion "Wildfire" Tommy Rich.

== History ==
=== Continental Championship Wrestling (1988–1989) ===
Johnny Rich began wrestling in 1981 under the ring name Roy Rodgers, making appearances in the Continental Wrestling Association, Mid-South Wrestling, and Georgia Championship Wrestling. It was in GCW in 1982 that he adopted the persona of Johnny Rich and was acknowledged as a cousin of Tommy Rich. Davey Rich began his career in 1985 in the Continental Wrestling Association, first appearing as Dave Haskins and wrestling as such for several years.

In 1988 both performers joined Continental Championship Wrestling, and it was here that Haskins was renamed Davey Rich and declared an onscreen cousin of Johnny Rich. The duo was dubbed The Party Patrol, and coming out to the Pour Some Sugar on Me by Def Leppard they began a series of matches in the CCW. The duo's first match came on July 21, 1988 where they battled The Rock 'n' Roll RPMs (Mike Davis & Tommy Lane) to a draw in Johnson City, Tennessee. The duo continued their partnership through the remainder of 1988, and on February 17, 1989 they defeated Jerry Stubbs & The Dirty White Boy to win the CWF Tag Team Championship. They would hold the titles until May 5, 1989, when they lost the championships to Masahiro Chono & Mike Davis.

=== World Championship Wrestling (1989) ===
The Party Patrol jumped to WCW in May 1989, with both Johnny and Davey Rich initially appearing as singles performers. They made their first appearance on the May 20, 1989 episode of World Championship Wrestling. Declaring themselves The Party Patrol, the Riches lamented that they had arrived too late to enter the tournament for the vacated NWA World Tag-Team Championship tournament.

The duo began teaming later that summer, and the team made their WCW when they faced The Skyscrapers on July 14, 1989 in Memphis, Tennessee. On the July 22nd edition of World Championship Wrestling Johnny and Davey Rich teamed with Tommy Rich to defeat George South, Lee Scott, & Trent Knight. A week later on World Championship Wrestling the Riches trio was defeated by The Skyscrapers and Norman. The Party Patrol would go on to face the Skyscrapers in house show matches before Davey Rich left the promotion.

=== Smoky Mountain Wrestling (1992) ===
Davey Rich returned to the Continental Wrestling Federation in 1990 while Johnny Rich continued on in World Championship Wrestling, the latter frequently teaming with Joey Maggs as The WCW Creatures. However in 1992 the Party Patrol reunited in Jim Cornette's new Smoky Mountain Wrestling promotion. The duo made their debut on March 12, 1992 where they were defeated in the quarterfinals for the SMW Tag-Team Championship by Rip Morgan and Jack Victory. Wrestling as The Party Patrol once more, they faced winners of the tournament The Heavenly Bodies on May 22, 1992 at Volunteer Slam.

=== Aftermath ===
Both members of the Party Patrol returned to World Championship Wrestling in 1993, although they competed separately in singles competition.

The duo reunited once more on July 22, 1995 at an event for Tennessee Mountain Wrestling where they faced the World Famous Spoilers. This would be Johnny Rich's last match for twelve years; meanwhile Davey Rich continued wrestling in the United States Wrestling Association and the World Wrestling Federation.

== Championships and accomplishments ==
- Continental Wrestling Federation
  - CWF Tag Team Championship (1 time)
- USA Wrestling
  - USA World Tag Team Championship (1 time)
