= Steve Lawler =

Steve Lawler may refer to:

- Steve Lawler (DJ)
- Steve Lawler (wrestler)
