= Southern Championship Wrestling (disambiguation) =

Southern Championship Wrestling may refer to:

- Southern Championship Wrestling, a former North Carolina–based wrestling promotion run by Greg Mosorjak
- Southern Championship Wrestling (Georgia), a former Georgia-based wrestling promotion run by Jerry Blackwell
- Southern Championship Wrestling, a former Tennsessee-based wrestling promotion run by Jim Crockett
