= Charles Igglesden =

New Zealand architect, artist, and surveyor

Charles Moore Igglesden (1832–1920) was a New Zealand architect, artist, and surveyor. Igglesden trained in architecture and engineering in England before migrating to New Zealand, upon arrival he took up work as a surveyor. Igglesden spent most of his career as a surveyor, with architectural work taking place intermittently. Alongside his career as an architect and surveyor, Igglesden was an avid photographer and painter—several of his works are housed in the National Library of New Zealand.

== Early life ==
Charles Moore Igglesden was born in Colaba, Bombay Presidency, British India in June 1832 to William Igglesden, a naval commander in the East India Company. Igglesden's early education was in continental Europe. Igglesden received training in architecture and engineering in Pembrokeshire, England; he went on to apprentice under Henry Edward Kendall Jr in London and studied at the Royal Academy.

== Career ==
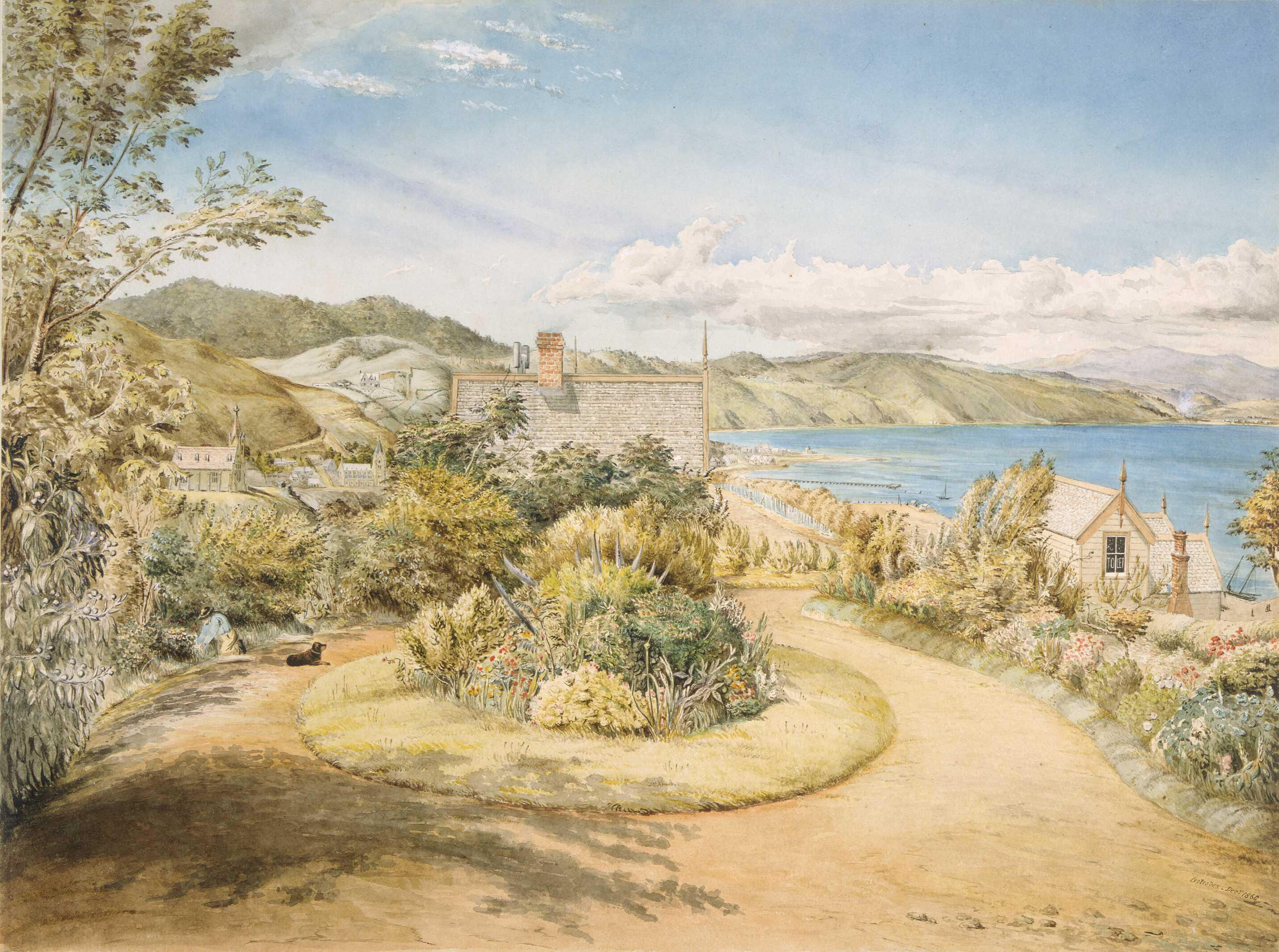
View of Wellington from Captain Sharp's house, by Igglesden. Igglesden was the nephew of Captain Sharp

In 1855 Igglesden left England for New Zealand, arriving in Melbourne, Victoria aboard the Mermaid and arriving in Wellington in 1856. Shortly after arrival he entered a competition to design the Wellington Provincial Government buildings; the building was constructed in 1857 with Igglesden complaining publicly that parts of his design were used without him receiving any acknowledgement for the work. That same year, Igglesden became a draughtsman for the Wellington Provincial Government Survey Department.

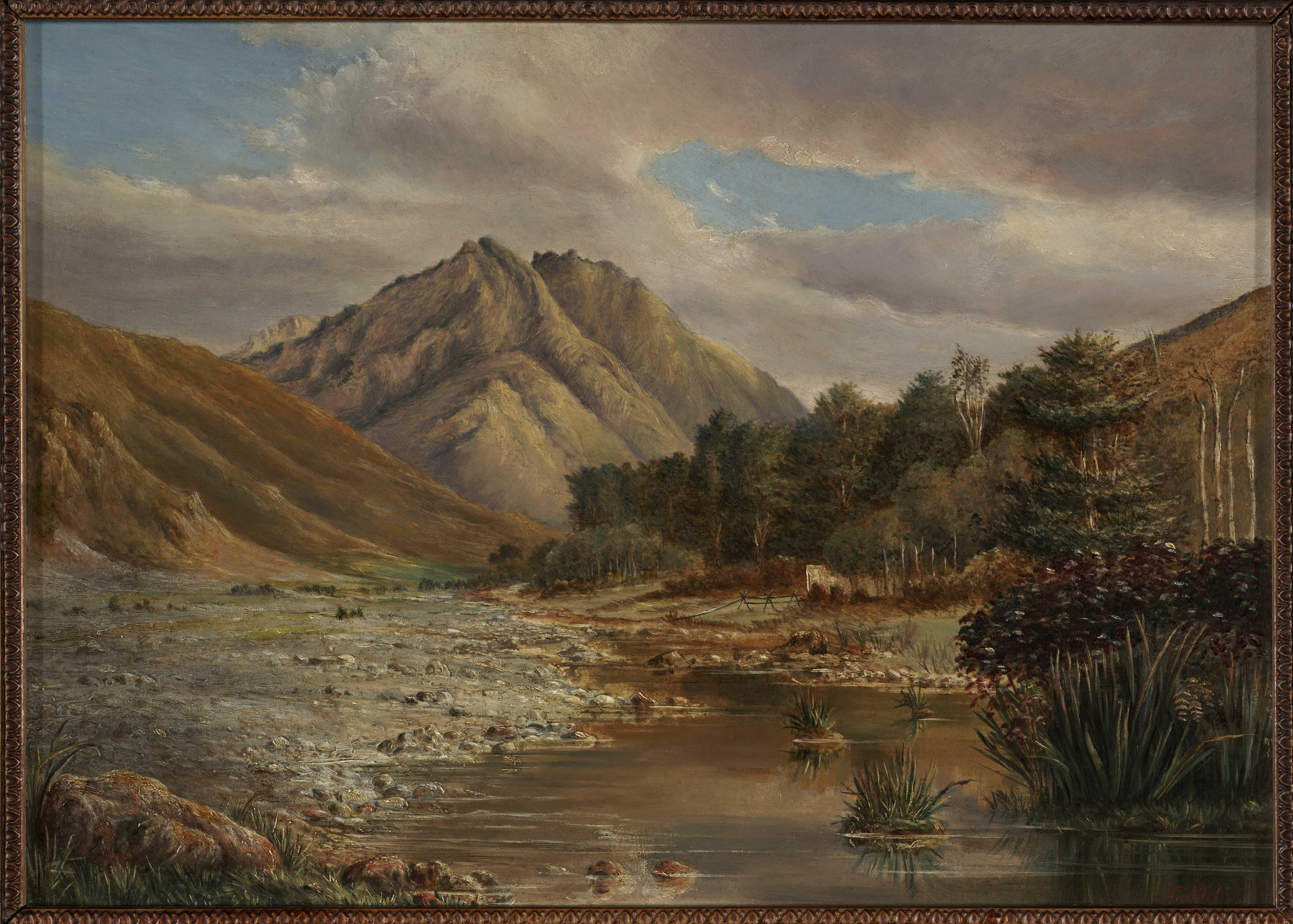
Painting of Mount Iris and the Rainbow River, Nelson

In the 1850s Igglesden was a member of the Wellington Rifle Volunteers, although he never saw active service in the New Zealand Wars. In 1866 Igglesden became a lieutenant of the Lyttelton Artillery Volunteers and on 2 December 1868 he was made a lieutenant of the first Wellington company of the New Zealand Militia.

From 1863 to August 1865 Igglesden served as town surveyor for Lyttelton, during this period Igglesden designed the Akaroa Town Hall. After working as town surveyor he became an engineer for the Canterbury Provincial Government, working under Edward Dobson. In 1870 Igglesden left Lyttelton to work for the Wellington Provincial Government. Igglesden formed a partnership with Edwin James Campion in 1870, the partnership lasted a year and no known tenders mention the partnership. Igglesdon went to work as a draughtsman in Nelson. In total Igglesden had spent 37 years working as a surveyor.

In 1884 Igglesden exhibited his photographs and artworks at the New Zealand Academy of Fine Arts in Wellington, he also exhibited a design for a church. Igglesden would exhibit his works at other Academy of Fine Arts events in Wellington.

== Retirement ==
After Igglesden's retirement c. 1910, he returned to Wellington living on Kelburn Parade with his daughter. A fire destroyed his home and most of his paintings and photographs on 13 April 1912. Following the fire Igglesden moved to Rawhiti Terrace until his death in 1920. Igglesden is buried at the Sydney Street cemetery in Wellington.

== Personal life ==
Igglesden married Sarah Nichols in 1863, Sarah died not long after. Igglesden married Selina Julia Curtis in 1870, Selina died in 1893. Igglesden has 7 daughters and 1 son.

Igglesden was a Freemason and held the position of District Grand Secretary of the North Island.

Igglesden was an avid photographer and painter with several of his surviving works being held by the National Library of New Zealand.

== List of works ==
Name	Date	Image	Note	Ref
St Peter's Church, Te Aro	1857		Designed an alteration for the church. Replaced in 1879	
Wellington post office and customhouse	1862			
Forbes Store	1863		The two-storey building in the centre of the image. Demolished due to damage from the 2011 Canterbury earthquake, formerly registered with Heritage New Zealand.	
Akaroa Town Hall	1864		Scheduled with the Christchurch City Council	
Lyttelton Orphanage	before 1869		Burnt down in 1904	
Wellington Customhouse	1902 or 1905		Demolished 1969	
