= Ricky Lawless =

American professional wrestler and promoter (1959–1988)

Personal information
- Born: Meraldo Jim Leon Jr. December 3, 1959 Washington, D.C., U.S.
- Died: November 30, 1988 (aged 28) Baltimore, Maryland, U.S.

Professional wrestling career
- Ring name(s): Ricky Lawless; Ricki Lawless; Rikki Lawless; Jim Nunna; Jim Leon
- Billed height: 6 ft 1 in (1.85 m)
- Billed weight: 258 lb (117 kg)

Medardo Jim "Jimmy" Leon Jr. (December 3, 1959 – November 30, 1988) was an American professional wrestler, trainer and promoter, best known by his ringname "Bad Boy" Ricky (Ricki) Lawless, who competed in Eastern, Mid-Atlantic and Southern regional territories during the early to mid-1980s, being a veteran of International Championship Wrestling and the National Wrestling Federation.

Leon was also the owner of a successful wrestling school whose students included Steve "The Brawler" Lawler, "Playboy" Bobby Starr, Axl Rotten and Joey Maggs. He and Maggs later teamed together as The Heavy Metal Connection and twice captured the tag team titles in Buck Robley's Deep South Championship Wrestling. His murder in 1988, reportedly committed by a jealous husband over an extramarital affair, was featured in an exposé by Hustler.

== Career ==
Jim Leon was born in Washington, D.C. in 1959. He worked as a mechanic prior to becoming a professional wrestler and later lived in Charlotte, North Carolina and Baltimore, Maryland. He initially wrestled and trained only twice a week, while still a full-time mechanic, and quit three times due to his financial situation before deciding to fully commit to a career in wrestling. Throughout the 1980s, he wrestled up and down the Eastern United States and eventually became a regular in International Championship Wrestling and the National Wrestling Federation. In 1984, under the ring name Jim Nunna, he became the first heavyweight champion for the American Wrestling Federation in Georgia; while champion he began competing under his real name.

Leon also started a wrestling school in a disused boxing gym located at the corner of North Avenue and Harford road. It was a Baltimore City run gym, wherein he and Dave Coleman, a pro wrestler who had been trained by Killer Kowalski trained a number of future independent stars including Steve "The Brawler" Lawler, "Playboy" Bobby Starr, and Axl Rotten. He later formed a team with one of his students, Joey Maggs, and twice won the tag team belts in Buck Robley's Deep South Championship Wrestling (later known as Southern Championship Wrestling). He and Maggs, as The Heavy Metal Connection, became a popular tag team in the Mid-Atlantic region as well as for promotions in Mississippi and Louisiana. In 1987, Leon was featured in an article for The Charlotte Observer in which he discussed his career and his experiences on the independent circuit. He also felt hopeful that he and Maggs might be hired by the National Wrestling Alliance. During the summer of 1988, while wrestling for Frank Cain's Star Cavalcade Wrestling, he and his student Axl Rotten briefly held the SCW Tag Team Championship after defeating The Smurfs (Corey Stevens & Dynamite Kid) for the titles in Montgomery, Alabama. They later dropped the belts to Rick Anderson & Snake Watson. In September, he defeated Moondog in Bainbridge, Georgia to win the promotion's heavyweight championship; the title had been held up the previous month when their last match ended in a double-disqualification.

He has been credited not only for having trained some of the top Mid-Atlantic independent wrestlers of the 1980s and 90s, but for being one of the standout stars during the final years of the territory-era. Dr. Thom Parks, a former referee and well-known "dirt sheet" writer, said in a 2003 interview that Leon "was a party animal, but he was also a very talented grappler. I really think he would have went far had he lived longer. Jimmy was funny and he could have a four star match versus a broom. He really had a lot of talent. It's just too bad that more people didn't get to see it. Of course, when you party as much as he did and do some of the unwise things he did, you can't expect a long lifespan. Even though we didn't see eye to eye on everything, Jimmy was probably my best friend in the wrestling business."

== Death ==
On November 30, 1988, Leon was shot to death in Baltimore, Maryland where he died in the arms of his girlfriend. The Toronto Star claimed the murder had been committed by a "former tag team partner." Leon's murder, specifically focusing on the aspect of his death at the hands of an irate husband over an alleged extramarital affair, would later appear as an exposé by Hustler ("Shotgun Justice: A Pro Wrestler's Final Fall") in May 1991. At the time of his murder (at his home with his girlfriend, Christine P.), he was still the reigning heavyweight champion for Star Cavalcade Wrestling. After his passing, the title was declared vacant and was won by his former student Axl Rotten after defeating The Psycho in Thomasville, Georgia.

== Championships and accomplishments ==
- American Wrestling Federation
  - AWF Heavyweight Championship (1 time, inaugural)
- Atlantic Coast Wrestling
  - ACW Heavyweight Championship (2 times)
  - ACW Tag Team Championship (1 time, inaugural) - with John Death
- Deep South Championship Wrestling / Southern Championship Wrestling
  - SCW Southern Tag Team Championship (2 times) – with Joey Maggs
- Star Cavalcade Wrestling
  - SCW Heavyweight Championship (1 time)
  - SCW Tag Team Championship (1 time) – with Axl Rotten

== See also ==
- List of premature professional wrestling deaths
