= SCW Tag Team Championship (Georgia) =

Professional wrestling tag team championship

SCW Heavyweight Championship

Details
- Promotion: Southern Championship Wrestling
- Date established: 1988
- Date retired: 1990
Statistics
- First champion(s): Tommy Rich and Ted Oates
- Final champion(s): Billy Starr and Kareem Muhammad (won 1990)
- Most reigns: Thunder & Lightning (Steve Lawler and Dino Minelli) (2)
- Longest reign: Thunder & Lightning (68 days)

The SCW Tag Team Championship was a professional wrestling tag team championship in Southern Championship Wrestling (SCW). It remained active until early-1990 when SCW was closed.

The inaugural champions were "Wildfire" Tommy Rich and Ted Oates, who defeated Bob Orton, Jr. and "Dirty" Dick Slater in a tournament final in 1988 to become the first SCW Tag Team Champions. Thunder & Lightning (Steve Lawler and Dino Minelli) holds the record for most reigns, with two. At 68 days, Thunder & Lightning's first reign is the longest in the title's history. Overall, there have been 12 reigns shared between 11 wrestlers, with one vacancy, and 1 deactivation.

== Title history ==
Key
No.	Overall reign number
Reign	Reign number for the specific team—reign numbers for the individuals are in parentheses, if different
Days	Number of days held

No.	Champion	Championship change			Reign statistics		Notes	Ref.
No.	Champion	Date	Event	Location	Reign	Days	Notes	Ref.
1	Tommy Rich and Ted Oates	1988	SCW show	Macon, Georgia	1	N/A	Rich and Oates defeated Bob Orton, Jr. and Dick Slater to become the first SCW Tag Team Champions.	
2	Zebra Warriors	1988	SCW show	N/A	1	N/A		
3	Tommy Rich (2) and Steve Prichard	July 22, 1988	SCW show	Columbus, Georgia	1	N/A		
4	Tommy Rich (3) and Joey Maggs	1988	SCW show	N/A	1	N/A		
5	Doug Somers and Joel Deaton	1988	SCW show	N/A	1	N/A		
6	Ranger Ross and Joey Maggs (2)	1988	SCW show	N/A	1	N/A		
7	Thunder & Lightning (Steve Lawler and Dino Minelli)	October 23, 1988	SCW show	Alpharetta, Georgia	1	68		
8	Ranger Ross (2) and Mr. Wrestling II	December 30, 1988	SCW show	Atlanta, Georgia	1	N/A		
9	Thunder & Lightning (Steve Lawler and Dino Minelli)	1989	SCW show	N/A	2	N/A		
10	Georgia Power (The Nightmare and Jimmy Powell)}	1989	SCW show	N/A	1	N/A		
11	Mr. Atlanta and Mike Golden	1989	SCW show	N/A	1	N/A		
—	Vacated	N/A	SCW show	—	—	—		
12	Billy Starr and Kareem Muhammad	January 28, 1990	SCW show	Griffin, Georgia	1	N/A	Starr and Muhammad defeated Georgia Power (The Nightmare and Jimmy Powell) to win the vacant title.	
—	Deactivated	1990	—	—	—	—	SCW closed in early-1990 and Starr and Muhammad were the final champions in SCW as a company.	
