= SCW Heavyweight Championship (Georgia) =

Professional wrestling championship

Details
- Promotion: Southern Championship Wrestling
- Date established: June 25, 1988
- Date retired: 1990
Statistics
- First champion(s): Chris Adams
- Final champion(s): Joel Deaton
- Most reigns: Joel Deaton (2)
- Longest reign: Joel Deaton (199 days)
- Shortest reign: The Bullet (14 days)

The SCW Heavyweight Championship was a professional wrestling regional championship in Southern Championship Wrestling (SCW). It remained active until early-1990 when SCW was closed.

The inaugural champion was "Gentleman" Chris Adams, who defeated Buck Robley in a tournament final on June 25, 1988 to become the first SCW Heavyweight Champion. "Outlaw" Joel Deaton holds the record for most reigns, with two. At 114 days, Deaton's first reign is the longest in the title's history. The Bullet's only reign was the shortest in the history of the title holding the belt for only 14 days before losing it to "Wildfire" Tommy Rich. Overall, there have been 8 reigns shared between 7 wrestlers, with one vacancy, and 1 deactivation.

== Title history ==
Key
No.	Overall reign number
Reign	Reign number for the specific champion
Days	Number of days held

No.	Champion	Championship change			Reign statistics		Notes	Ref.
No.	Champion	Date	Event	Location	Reign	Days	Notes	Ref.
1	Chris Adams	June 25, 1988	SCW show	Columbus, Georgia	1	N/A	Adams defeated Buck Robley in a tournament final to become the first SCW Heavyweight Champion.	
2	Moondog Spot	1988	SCW show	N/A	1	N/A		
3	The Bullet	September 4, 1988	SCW show	Atlanta, Georgia	1	14		
34	Tommy Rich	September 18, 1988	SCW show	Marietta, Georgia	1	N/A		
5	Jon Michaels	N/A	SCW show	N/A	1	N/A		
—	Vacated	1989	—	—	—	—		
6	Joel Deaton	May 21, 1989	SCW show	Griffin, Georgia	1	119		
7	David Sammartino	October 30, 1989	SCW show	Alpharetta, Georgia	1	N/A		
8	Joel Deaton	N/A	SCW show	N/A	2	N/A	Deaton is awarded the title.	
—	Deactivated	1990	—	—	—	—	SCW closed in early-1990 and Deaton was the final champion in SCW as a company.	
