= Superstars of Wrestling (American TV series) =

- Also known as: Saturday Night Superstars
- Genre: Professional wrestling
- Created by: Joe Pedicino
- Presented by: Joe Pedicino (1985–1992); Boni Blackstone (1986–1992); Gordon Solie (1986–1987); Rhubarb Jones (1987); Regular guests: Bill Apter (1986–1988); Paul E. Dangerously (1987–1988); Gary Hart (1986–1987); Michael Hayes (1986–1987)
- Opening theme: "Holding Out for a Hero" by Bonnie Tyler
- Country of origin: United States
- No. of seasons: 6

Original release
- Network: WATL (1985); Syndicated (1986 - 1992)
- Release: May 1986 – August 1992

Superstars of Wrestling is a nationally syndicated professional wrestling television program that aired throughout the United States from 1985 to 1992. Created and produced by Joe Pedicino, the series broadcast eight hours of wrestling from around the country and was the first to provide national coverage of both the National Wrestling Alliance and international promotions. It was also the earliest U.S. television show to regularly broadcast Japanese puroresu and joshi wrestling as part of the Fuji Television Network's efforts to develop a market in the American television industry.

The series was initially hosted by Pedicino who was later joined by Boni Blackstone and Gordon Solie. Pedicino and Solie hosted a popular segment on the show, "Pro Wrestling This Week", which discussed the then current news from the "Big Three" (AWA, NWA and the WWF) as well as regional territories. Bill Apter, editor of Pro Wrestling Illustrated, has also credited Pedicino for considerably raising his profile among wrestling fans due to his weekly segment. The magazine's yearly awards ceremony was shown on Superstars of Wrestling in 1987 and 1988.

== History ==
=== Development ===
Superstars of Wrestling was developed by Joe Pedicino while working at WATL TV 36 in 1985. A graduate of University of Pennsylvania's Wharton Business School, Pedicino had been with the station's sales department for only two months when he pitched the idea to management. The Black Saturday incident had occurred a year earlier and professional wrestling was still very popular in Atlanta, Georgia. The station's Saturday morning wrestling show from the NWA's Memphis territory was getting very low ratings despite its booming popularity on television. Pedicino, a wrestling fan for most of his life, advised the program director that WATL was "running the wrong show at the wrong time". The Memphis promotion sent the station random footage that was out of order and confused Georgia area fans as the results from upcoming matches were never acknowledged the following week. Pedicino explained that it was the equivalent of a soap opera teasing the audience with a cliffhanger and then never following up on next week's episode. Instead, Pedicino argued, WATL should capitalize on the popularity of Jim Crockett Promotions' flagship show WCW Saturday Night on TBS by moving their show to prime time.

Inspired by the success of Elvira's Movie Macabre, Pedicino proposed broadcasting eight hours of professional wrestling from the National Wrestling Alliance's regional territories, as well as from Puerto Rico and Japan, allowing wrestling fans to watch programming from throughout the United States for the first time. The station agreed to extend the show to fill up its night time programming schedule. Pedicino was later able to acquire Japanese puroresu and joshi wrestling as part of the Fuji Television Network's efforts to develop a market in the American television industry.

=== Early popularity ===
Superstars of Wrestling debuted in May 1985, airing on Saturday nights from 8:00 pm to 3:00 am, was a ratings success. Eight different wrestling organizations from as far away as Dallas, Texas and Birmingham, Alabama were broadcast during its first year. These would later include the Continental Wrestling Association, Georgia Championship Wrestling, Mid-South Wrestling and World Class Championship Wrestling as well as events from around the world. Because the show never disclosed that the wrestling being shown was pre-taped, with Pedicino adding commentary during post-production, fans watching the show at home would often travel to the studio hoping to attend the show. In November, twenty fans drove in a van from Snellville, Georgia to the locked studio in downtown Atlanta, only to be turned away by security.

Pedicino served as both executive producer and host throughout its near 7-year run. He was joined by fellow ring announcer Rhubarb Jones and 21-year-old Boni Blackstone, who later became his wife. Pedicino had hosted the show alone for the first six months before an on-air contest was held to find a new co-host. Out of 70 women, only 20 made the finals with Blackstone winning the competition. Gordon Solie also joined the show as a regular color commentator The popular wrestling announcer, then working for Championship Wrestling from Florida, had to commute from Tampa, Florida to Atlanta each week. Solie would also host a featured segment with Pedicino, "Pro Wrestling This Week", which discussed wrestling news from around the country. They were sometimes joined by Bill Apter, who had his own segment, and co-produced interview segments with Pro Wrestling Illustrated featuring many of wrestling stars of the 1980s. Apter's appearances, as well as those on TBS, considerably raised his profile among wrestling fans of the era.

The show was watched in over 20 major television markets in its first year. By the summer of 1987, the show broadcast in 40 cities, including New York City, Los Angeles and Chicago, and eventually syndicated throughout the country. In May 1988, Pedicino claimed that the show was being aired in France. At the height of its popularity, Superstars of Wrestling was aired in 90 cities. He and Blackstone became seen as local celebrities in Atlanta but Pedicino brushed off the attention regarding themselves as "wrestling fans who got lucky". Earlier that year, he and Blackstone hosted the three-day 20th annual Miller High Life World of Wheels car show held at Atlanta's World Congress Center. Sponsored by the National Automotive Parts Association, the event displayed over 500 of the most expensive custom designed antique vehicles in the world including the 18-wheel Volvo "Elvis' Eldorado". French entertainer "Miss World of Wheels" Danielle Cheavalier and wrestling valet Miss Sunshine of The Fabulous Freebirds were also at the event. The two were also the first-ever wrestling personalities to host the Georgia-area Emmy Awards.

=== Rivalry with Deep South Wrestling ===
In early 1988, Pedicino began co-promoting Southern Championship Wrestling with Jerry Blackwell. Blackwell's ability to bring in top talent and Pedicino's television show saw SCW shoot to the top of the Georgia independent circuit. Their success, however, brought them into conflict with rival "outlaw" promotion Deep South Wrestling run by Jody Hamilton. DSW ran on Channel 69 which was a competitor against the station that aired Superstars of Wrestling. The rival station had created its own Saturday night wrestling bloc to compete directly with Pedecino's show, but failed to challenge him in the ratings. When WATL began airing SCW programming in February 1988, DSW responded with parodying the Superstars of Wrestling hosts;

On a recent Deep South Wrestling show, they made fun of Joe Pedicino and Bonnie Blackstone. They did a skit with a guy in an easy chair pretending to be Pedicino, but getting stuck in his chair and needing help to get out. Blackstone was parodied as a total bimbo. Southern countered by showing a clip of The Invader vs The Assassin, with Pedicino saying, "This is the Puerto Rican Assassin because there is nobody named The Assassin in the United States that can wrestle," a dig at Jody Hamilton, the group's headliner.

Pedicino also helped promote the Southern Championship Training Center, a rival training facility of Hamilton's American Academy of Professional Wrestling, in Cumming, Georgia. The year-long promotional war ended when Hamilton suffered an in-ring injury and was forced to sell DSW at the end of the year.

=== Charity appearances ===
Pedicino and Blackstone used their celebrity status to promote charity events through Superstars of Wrestling including, most notably, their two-hour "Wrestlethon" television special. The first show raised an estimated $10,000 and helped save the life of teenager Deloris Wadsworth who needed a liver transplant. The second show raised between $12,000-$13,000 for wounded police officers J.J. Biello and Richard Williams. "Wrestlethon '88", which aired on July 17, 1988, was broadcast nationwide via satellite by Fox Broadcasting as part of The Late Show. It was able to raise enough money to purchase 200-300 bulletproof vests of the 1,100 needed for the Atlanta Police Department. Four months later, Pedicino appeared with a number of media figures and television celebrities at a benefit show, "Celebrity Cookoff for a Cure", held by the Juvenile Diabetes Foundation at Benihana. Other participants included Atlanta Magazine editor Lee Walburn, Atlanta Business Chronicle editor Anita Sharpe, Creative Loafing publisher Deborah Eason and local WSB-TV personalities John Pruitt and Bebe Emerman.

=== Later years ===
The early 1990s saw new changes to Superstars of Wrestling. After a brief hiatus, the show returned under the name Saturday Night Superstars. Scott Hudson and Steve Prazak, announcers for Georgia All-Star Wrestling, were brought in for a "Laurel and Hardy"-style segment called "Point-Counterpoint". Both men had been fans of the show prior to being hired by Pedicino. That same year, he and Blackstone became married. This came a surprise, both to wrestling fans and the staff, as the two had a well-known kayfabe adversarial relationship on the show much like Gorilla Monsoon and Bobby "The Brain" Heenan on WWF Wrestling Challenge. Pedicino played the "straight man" of the team who teased and played pranks on Blackstone. The two would continue their routines off-camera, keeping even the production crew in the dark, by driving home in separate cars and Blackstone addressing her then boyfriend as "Mr. Pedicino" in front of studio employees during the first two years of their relationship. Pedicino also had an 11-year-old son, Vince, from a previous marriage and was also sometimes seen on the show. Creative differences between Pedicino and Solie also saw the longtime commentator depart from the show.

=== Cancellation ===
Pedicino decided to end Superstars of Wrestling in August 1992 due to other commitments. Scott Hudson and Steve Prazak were brought into the GWF where they continued their "Point-Counterpoint" segment on ESPN. Pedicino considered bringing the show back after leaving the Global Wrestling Federation but ultimately decided to return to the radio industry.

== Production ==
Superstars of Wrestling aired on Saturday nights from 8:00 PM to 3:00 AM and was approximately 368 minutes in length (produced for a 7-8 hour time-slot) per episode. "Pro Wrestling This Week" had a 46-minute runtime. The show was filmed at WATL TV 36 in downtown Atlanta with some segments and interviews being shot on location. After WATL became a Fox affiliate in 1988, the show moved to WGNX in an effort to remain on prime time. It later broadcast from WTLK-TV in Rome, Georgia.

=== Episode format ===
Unlike "traditional" televised wrestling which aired standard wrestling matches from weekly house shows, Superstars of Wrestling was presented as a news and entertainment program. It was a groundbreaking concept that took the average wrestling fan through each of the major NWA territories and discussed various storylines and news stories of the day. A typical episode included pre-taped matches interspersed with interviews, light comedy, and news commentary. The show's unique nature allowed for wrestlers working in different promotions to interact with each other. On the July 27, 1987 edition of Superstars of Wrestling, Paul E. Dangerously and Lou Albano, from the American Wrestling Association and World Wrestling Federation respectively, had a showdown on who was the best manager in pro wrestling.

=== Memorable episodes ===
Episode	Date	Rating	Notes
Superstars of Wrestling Debut	May 1986	N/A	The first ever Superstars of Wrestling episode.
Wrestlethon '86	July 1986	N/A	Telethon for teenager in need of a liver transplant.
1986 PWI awards	January 3, 1987	N/A	Pro Wrestling This Week: The Rock 'n' Roll Express accepts the PWI Tag Team of the Year Award, Lex Luger accepts the PWI Rookie of the Year Award, Paul Orndorff accepts PWI Most Hated Wrestler of the Year Award, Lou Albano accepts the PWI Manager of the Year Award, Cathy Gagne (on behalf of her father) accepts the PWI Editor's Award, and Ric Flair accepts the PWI Wrestler of the Year Award.
Pro Wrestling This Week	February 5, 1987	N/A	Sting and Rick Steiner defeat Terry Taylor and Chris Adams for the UWF World Tag Team Championship.
Pro Wrestling This Week	April 25, 1987	N/A	Death of Mike Von Erich.
Pro Wrestling This Week	May 9, 1987	N/A	Big Bubba Rogers defeats One Man Gang for the UWF World Heavyweight Championship.
Pro Wrestling This Week	May 23, 1987	N/A	Curt Hennig defeats Nick Bockwinkel for the AWA World Heavyweight Championship.
Pro Wrestling This Week	June 20, 1987	N/A	Scott Armstrong defeats Tom Prichard for the NWA Southeastern United States Junior Heavyweight Championship.
Pro Wrestling This Week	July 27, 1987	N/A	Confrontation between Lou Albano vs. Paul E. Dangerously.
Pro Wrestling This Week	June 13, 1987	N/A	The Rock 'n' Roll Express defeats Rick Rude and Manny Fernandez for the NWA World Tag Team Championship.
Wrestlethon '87	July 1987	N/A	Telethon for two police officers wounded in the line of duty.
Pro Wrestling This Week	August 8, 1987	N/A	Badd Company defeats Billy Joe Travis and Jeff Jarrett in a tournament final for the AWA Southern Tag Team Championship.
Wrestlethon '88	July 17, 1988	N/A	Telethon for the Atlanta Police Department. Eddie Gilbert attacked Joey Maggs during the show.
1987 PWI awards	January 9, 1988	N/A	Pro Wrestling This Week: Owen Hart accepts the PWI Rookie of the Year Award, Curt Hennig accepts PWI Most Improved Wrestler of the Year Award, and Paul Boesch accepts the PWI Editor's Award.
Pro Wrestling This Week	January 16, 1988	N/A	Greg Gagne defeats Adrian Adonis in a tournament final for the AWA International Television Championship.
Pro Wrestling This Week	March 26, 1988	N/A	Paul E. Dangerously buys Pro Wrestling This Week.

== Revival on FOX Sports Radio ==
In August 2000, Pedicino and his wife Boni began hosting Pro Wrestling this Week on FOX Sports Radio, which ran on Sunday nights from 11:00 pm to 1:00 am. They later appeared together at the NWA 52nd Anniversary Show.

== Legacy ==
Superstars of Wrestling was the first and only independently produced wrestling U.S. television program. Prior to the development of the internet, television audiences were often subject to region-specific programming. The series allowed wrestling fans to watch promotions outside their local areas for the first time. It was considered a groundbreaking concept at the time. Initially available to Atlanta, Georgia it eventually spread to wrestling fans across the country. Chris Bridges of Banks County News called it "a teenage pro wrestling fan’s dream come true". Among its fans included runner Scott Ludwig, NWA Anarchy promoter Charles Anschutz, manager Dave Wills, best known as the "Crying Wrestling Fan", and wrestling historian Brian Shields.

Superstars of Wrestling was supported by the wrestling industry, including WWF owner Vince McMahon, then competing against NWA promoters, who saw the show as free advertising. Jim Ross, then play-by-play commentator for WCW Saturday Night, was a supporter of the show and commented that "our fans in Atlanta are lucky to get to see it". The show was a "launching pad" for up-and-coming stars in the business. Bill Apter, Gary Hart, Michael Hayes, and Paul E. Dangerously all hosted segments for "Pro Wrestling This Week". Dangerously credited his appearances on Superstars of Wrestling as an opportunity to improve as an on-air performer. Scott Hudson and Steve Prazak were fans of the show and given their first big break by Pedicino when he began promoting events in the late 1980s. They eventually went on to become announcers for World Championship Wrestling.

In June 2014, wrestling columnist Brian Bayless suggested the World Wrestling Entertainment study Pedicino's program in order to improve its 24-hour wrestling network. Buck Woodward of PWInsider.com speculated on the feasibility of Pedicino's model for internet television to cover the 21st century independent circuit.

== See also ==
- List of professional wrestling television series
