= Big Bully Busick =

American professional wrestler, powerlifter

Personal information
- Born: Nicholas Robert Busick; June 1, 1954 Steubenville, Ohio, U.S.
- Died: May 8, 2018 (aged 63) Weirton, West Virginia, U.S.
- Cause of death: Cancer

Professional wrestling career
- Ring name(s): Big Bully Busick; Comrade Busick; Nick Busick; Powerhouse Busick
- Billed height: 6 ft 0 in (1.83 m)
- Billed weight: 265 lb (120 kg)
- Billed from: "Pittsburgh by way of Steubenville, Ohio"; Weirton, West Virginia "Powerhouse Hill"
- Trained by: Mike Padiousis
- Debut: 1977
- Retired: April 19, 2013

Nicholas Busick (June 1, 1954 – May 8, 2018) was an American professional wrestler and police officer, better known by his ring name Big Bully Busick. He is best known for his appearances with the World Wrestling Federation (WWF) in 1991, where he portrayed a stereotypical bully from the 1920s with a "turtleneck, bowler hat and king-sized cigar". Busick is also known for his appearances with Georgia All-Star Wrestling (GAF) and the Global Wrestling Federation (GWF).

== Professional wrestling career ==
Born in Steubenville, Ohio, Busick grew up in the steel town of Weirton, West Virginia. He was an amateur wrestler at Weir High School, and was also an accomplished powerlifter throughout the 1970s. In 1971, he unsuccessfully attempted to break Jim Williams' bench press record of 635 lb (288 kg). He became a police officer in 1973, at age 19 with the Weirton Police Department. He made his wrestling debut in 1977. Over the next two years, Busick had several more matches with the WWWF (renamed WWF in 1979) when they held shows in the Pittsburgh area, usually as a jobber, though he won at least two matches. He never underwent any other formal training, stating he "learned in the ring". He left WWF in 1981.

In the early 1980s, after being invited to leave the Weirton Police Dept. Busick transferred to the Atlanta Police Department. In Atlanta, he began wrestling for Jerry Blackwell and developed the Bully persona, based on Joe Pedicino's observations of a stereotypical coal miner or steel mill worker. As part of the character, he wore a derby hat and turtleneck sweater, smoked a cigar on the way to the ring, and had a bushy handlebar moustache.

In early 1991, Busick worked for Global Wrestling Federation in Texas. Occasionally he teamed with Bad News Brown.

In July 1991, Busick debuted in the World Wrestling Federation (WWF), where he continued to utilize the Bully gimmick. In addition to bullying his opponents, Busick (along with his manager Harvey Wippleman) antagonized fans at ringside, committing such acts as popping a child's balloon with his cigar. He even harassed ring announcer Mike McGuirk, which eventually led to a save from opponent Sid Justice in a quick loss for Busick. After having spent weeks primarily squashing enhancement talent including a wins over Koko B. Ware and Jim Powers, Busick entered into a small feud with the Brooklyn Brawler after the Brawler challenged Busick to match to see who was the real bully of the WWF. The Brawler defeated the Bully by countout. A rematch one week later saw the Brawler fail to dominate the Bully with Wippleman grabbing the Brawler's leg leading to a controversial win for the Bully. Busick spent the remainder of his time in the WWF wrestling against Bret Hart, The British Bulldog, Kerry Von Erich, Greg Valentine, and Jimmy Snuka, before leaving the company in November 1991. Originally, Busick was supposed to be making his pay-per-view debut at Survivor Series 1991 with Col. Mustafa, The Berzerker, and The Skinner but was replaced by Hercules.

After WWF, he worked in the independent circuit until retiring in 1995.

He returned to wrestling in 2011 participating in independent shows. His last match was a victory over Josef von Schmidt for Five Star Wrestling in Weirton, West Virginia on April 19, 2013.

== Post wrestling ==
Alongside fellow wrestler Bill Eadie, Busick worked as a bodyguard in Atlanta. He also worked as a Senior Investigator for Criminal and Civil Investigations, and owned the Big Bully sports nutrition bar company. After returning to Weirton he was employed at Mountaineer Casino and Racetrack in Chester, Wv. as Casino Security Officer and bodyguard to then Casino Manager Ted Arnault A 2013 interview noted he kept a low profile wrestling-wise, other than occasional appearances at fan festivals, but did appear as a special guest referee at Deaf Wrestlefest in April 2012. He also promoted mixed martial arts events in Ohio. He also continued to compete in powerlifting competitions until 2015.

In November 2012, the WWE listed Busick as having the best mustache in the Top 10 mustaches in WWE history. The Big Bully Busick character was also listed 17 of the 25 most absurd wrestlers in WWE history in 2013. In March 2015, he was inducted in the Keystone State Wrestling Alliance Hall of Fame.

== Personal life ==
Busick was married to his wife Lorie for 32 years and they had three children together. His son Branko is a mixed martial artist. His family is of Serbian descent. He was involved in the Serbian community in the US and spoke the language.

=== Health problems ===
Busick had chronic atrial fibrillation. While exercising in 2005, he suffered a cardiac arrest and was saved via a defibrillator. He refused to seek hospital treatment at the time, but underwent surgery a few years later to correct the fibrillation.

== Death ==
In 2015, Busick was diagnosed with esophageal cancer. He initially had trouble swallowing, before bleeding in his throat. He underwent surgery and chemotherapy, during which he went from weighing 265 lb (120 kg) to 187 lb (85 kg). In June 2016, Busick announced he was cancer-free. The following year, Busick was diagnosed with a brain tumour and underwent neurosurgery. Busick died on May 8, 2018, in Weirton, West Virginia, where he was receiving hospice care.

== Championships and accomplishments ==
- North Georgia Wrestling Alliance
  - NGWA Heavyweight Championship (1 time)
- Keystone State Wrestling Alliance
  - Hall of Fame (2015)
