= Boni Blackstone =

American wrestling announcer (born 1965)

Bonnie Blackstone
Personal information
- Born: November 8, 1965 (age 60) Riverdale, Georgia, United States
- Spouse: Joe Pedicino
- Website: Official website

Professional wrestling career
- Ring name: Boni Blackstone
- Debut: 1986
- Retired: 1995

Bonnie "Boni" Blackstone (born November 8, 1965) is a retired American professional wrestling announcer, commentator, model, television and radio producer. She was a popular on-air personality in regional territories of the Southern United States during the 1980s, as part of the announcing team in the Global Wrestling Federation and briefly the World Wrestling Federation, as well as the longtime co-host of Superstars of Wrestling with husband Joe Pedicino and Gordon Solie from 1986 to 1992. She was one of the earliest, if not the first, female announcers in professional wrestling and has been praised by fellow women in the industry, such as Missy Hyatt, for portraying a more serious and intelligent personality in contrast to the typical wrestling valet.

She retired from wrestling in 1995, and eventually followed her husband into the radio industry. They produced and co-hosted WTLK TV-14 infomercial "Shoppers' Showcase" and, in 2000, began hosting Pro Wrestling this Week on FOX Sports Radio. Blackstone and Pedicino are also the owners of a successful publishing company, Food Fax, which puts out six specialty advertising guides a year. The company originally sent out fax listings to office workers listing lunch menus and daily specials from over 1,000 local restaurants in Cobb County, Georgia. It was the first of its kind to offer such service.

== Biography ==
=== Early career and Superstars of Wrestling ===
One of two daughters born to Buster and Annette Blackstone in 1965, Boni Blackstone grew up in Riverdale, Georgia, and graduated from North Clayton High School in 1984. She entered modeling, becoming "Miss Motorcraft 500" at Atlanta Motor Speedway, and was working as professional photographer with a studio in Fayetteville when Joe Pedicino, host of Superstars of Wrestling, began holding auditions to be his co-host. Out of 70 young women, Pedicino read 20-30 of the best letters on the show and selected Blackstone as the winner. As a lifelong wrestling fan, she impressed Pedicino with her knowledge of wrestling and natural camera presence. He later told The Atlanta Journal-Constitution in a 1986 interview, "I feel like we saved ourselves six weeks in training by selecting her. Her professionalism and ease in front of the camera are outstanding. We're extremely happy with her".

Unlike most women in professional wrestling, Blackstone was portrayed as a serious, intelligent commentator who often displayed her wrestling knowledge both calling matches with Pedicino and in interviews during her own segments. She became an instant hit with fans and, in November 1986, a group of twenty people drove in a van from Snellville, Georgia, to the locked studio in downtown Atlanta to see Blackstone and attend what they believed to be a live wrestling event. This became a common occurrence during the show's early years, as neither Pedicino or Blackstone disclosed whether the show was live or taped, and fans would often be turned away by security.

With the show's success, Pedicino and Blackstone became local celebrities although they often referred to themselves as "wrestling fans who got lucky". They often visited hospitals, were involved with charitable organizations The Atlanta Journal Constitution often ran stories featuring the private and professional lives of both.

=== Global Wrestling Federation ===
In 1991, she joined Pedicino in Dallas, Texas, where he and partner Max Andrews started the Global Wrestling Federation. Their new promotion was followed by much fanfare and, when Pedicino successfully negotiated with ESPN for a weekly television show later that year, Blackstone joined her husband as part of the announcing team with Scott Hudson, Steve Prazak and Craig Johnson. She remained the only female member, and primary interviewer, during her time with the promotion. On April 9, 1992, she and Pedicino were released from the promotion as a cost-cutting measure along with other core members of the GWF including booker Eddie Gilbert, head announcer Craig Johnson, and other key GWF members.

=== Retirement and recent years ===
When Superstars of Wrestling finally ended in August 1992, she and her husband started their own business Food Fax. The business initially began by distributing a two-page fax listing of 24 restaurants and their daily specials to office workers. The first company of its kind, the listing was sent out five nights a week to over 1,000 businesses in the Cobb County area.

Earlier that year, she appeared as a celebrity guest on Bill Cosby's You Bet Your Life. She was partnered with a parapsychologist to answer three questions about science and surprised the host and audience by correctly answering the first question, "What is sucrose?", and continued on to win $1,000 and a free trip to Philadelphia where the show was taped. Later that month, she appeared in the pages of National Enquirer as the winner of a Halloween costume contest held by the National Enquirer. The contestants were required to create costumes using only thread, glue, paste and pages from the tabloid. Blackstone's costume, which she called the "Enquira", was parody of late night movie host Elvira, Mistress of the Dark.

After taking a short break from wrestling, Blackstone sent an audition tape to World Championship Wrestling, and when nothing came of it, she tried her luck with the World Wrestling Federation. In March 1993, she was flown in for an audition and later met with Vince McMahon. Soon after, she was brought to the WWF as an interviewer and began appearing on WWF Superstars, WWF All-American Wrestling and the WWF Wrestling Challenge for several months. Between July and August, she appeared as a regular on-camera personality on WWF Mania interviewing a number of wrestlers including Money Inc. (Ted DiBiase & IRS), Adam Bomb and Johnny Polo, Bret "The Hitman" Hart and then WWF World Heavyweight Champion Yokozuna with Jim Cornette and Mr. Fuji. She later joined Ladies Professional Wrestling Association where was part of the announcing team with Sgt. Slaughter, Jim Cornette and Ken Resnick.

In 1995, Blackstone retired from professional wrestling, after a brief return to Dallas for the National Wrestling Alliance as an interviewer. She reentered the television industry produced and hosted WTLK TV-14 infomercial "Shoppers' Showcase". Blackstone would serve as Executive Producer and host of three television shows airing in Atlanta- Shoppers Showcase, Your Place Showcase and The Automotive Showcase. In August 2000, they hosted Pro Wrestling this Week on FOX Sports Radio, which ran on Sunday nights from 11:00 pm to 1:00 am, and later appeared at the NWA 52nd Anniversary Show. In 2004 Blackstone opened her own advertising agency and landed the role as "in-house" agency for the largest GM dealer on the East coast. In addition to carrying Chevrolet, GMC, Pontiac, Oldsmobile and Cadillac the dealership also carried Chrysler, Jeep and Hyundai. It was here that Blackstone developed a keen eye for media and public relations focusing on news paper, radio, direct mail, and promotions. She would later work for The Bill Heard organization as the Business Development Center Mgr and Internet Mgr. From there she would move her agency to assist her husband in running a radio station WEKS 92.5 The Bear. With Pedicino as acting GM, Blackstone would handle marketing the station as a community and brand ambassador and manage the sales team at the station. Blackstone has produced award winning campaigns for some of the stations marquee accounts. In 2009 Blackstone joined The Fayette County Chamber on behalf of the station. There she would co-chair the business expo, chamber golf tournament, chamber non-profit collaborative, serve on the board of directors and as an ambassador. Blackstone was awarded Volunteer of the Year in 2014 and her station Small Business of the Year for 2018. In 2017 she formed her 4th LLC company Marketing Behind The Mic. A company specializing in corporate and commercial video production.
