= Johnny Rich =

American professional wrestler (born 1958)

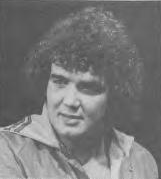

Personal information
- Born: Rod Wilsford; November 21, 1958 (age 67) Nashville, Tennessee, U.S.

Professional wrestling career
- Ring name(s): Johnny Rich; Intern; Roy Rogers
- Billed height: 6 ft 1 in (1.85 m)
- Billed weight: 246 lb (112 kg)
- Trained by: Tojo Yamamoto
- Debut: 1981
- Retired: 2007

Rod Wilsford (born November 21, 1958) is an American retired professional wrestler better known by his ring name Johnny Rich. He wrestled for the World Championship Wrestling in the early 1990s, Mid-South Wrestling, Continental Championship Wrestling, Continental Wrestling Association in Memphis, Georgia Championship Wrestling and other Southern promotions.

== Professional wrestling career ==
=== Continental Wrestling Association (1981–1982) ===
Rich made his debut in 1981 in Memphis as Roy Rogers in the CWA (Continental Wrestling Association, his first match coming on February 17, 1982 in Louisville, KY in a loss to Dutch Mantell. His first win came just four days later when he defeated Jimmy Kent at a house show in Nashville, TN by disqualification. Rich had a mixed rookie year, defeating Gypsy Joe and Buddy Wayne but losing to Wayne Ferris (the future Honkytonk Man) and Tojo Yamamoto.

=== Georgia Championship Wrestling (1982–1983) ===
Wilsford jumped to GCW (Georgia Championship Wrestling) in July 1982, making his first appearance on July 7 in Columbus, GA with a defeat of The Masked Superstar by disqualification. This would be his final appearance as "Roy Rogers", as he adopted the moniker Johnny Rich. On August 29, Rich competed in a tournament to crown the NWA National Heavyweight Championship, losing to Matt Bourne in the first round. In October he teamed with his cousin Tommy Rich for the first time, defeating Abdullah the Butcher and Matt Bourne at a house show in Columbus, GA on October 3. On November 25, The Riches competed in the 30,000 Dollar Thanksgiving Day Tag Team Tournament in Atlanta, GA, defeating Korstia Korchenko & The Iron Sheik in the first round and the Wild Samoans in the seminfinals before falling to The Moondogs in the finale.

=== Mid-South Wrestling (1983) ===
In April 1983 he moved to Mid-South Wrestling, losing to Jim Duggan on April 6 in Oklahoma City. He enjoyed success in Bill Watts' promotion, defeating numerous opponents including Boris Zukhov, Rip Rogers, and Johnny Mantell.

=== Georgia Championship Wrestling (1983–1984) ===
After a brief stint in the Continental Wrestling Federation, Rich returned to Georgia Championship Wrestling on November 20 and was defeated by King Kong Bundy at a house show in Canton, OH. As the winter began Rich received frequent shots at the NWA Television Championship, losing to Ted Dibiase and Jake Roberts. On February 19, 1984 he unsuccessfully challenged Les Thornton for the NWA Junior Heavyweight Championship. On March 13, 1984 he entered a tournament to crown the NWA Southeast Heavyweight Championship and upended The New Guinea Man Eater (Botswana Beast) in the first round before losing to Mr. Orient in the second round.

=== Southeast Championship Wrestling (1984–1985) ===
On March 26, 1984 Rich captured his first title, defeating Rip Rogers in his Southeast Championship Wrestling debut at an event in Birmingham, AL to win the NWA United States Junior Heavyweight Title. He defeated Rogers bu disqualification in a rematch on April 23 before losing the title to Tommy Gilbert on May 7.

In the summer of 1984 Johnny formed a tag-team with The Tonga Kid called "The RAT Patrol", and on June 4 the duo defeated Arn Anderson and Jerry Stubbs to win the NWA Southeastern Tag Team Title. The duo would lose and then regain their title on August 6, when they won back the championship from Anderson and Stubbs. This time they held the championship until on November 12, 1984, when The Rose Cousins (Pat Rose & Randy Rose) won the championship in Birmingham, AL.

On January 7, 1985 the RAT Patrol faced the Rose Cousins in a rematch held at a house show in Birmingham and regained the NWA Southeastern Tag Team Championship. The Patrol would successfully defend the titles until April 6, 1985 when they were defeated by The Nightmares (Danny Davis & Ken Wayne) at a television taping in Dothan, AL.

Johnny Rich entered a tournament to crown the Number One contender for the NWA World Championship in May 1985 and defeated Bill Ash in the first round on May 27. Later that night he battled to a no contest with Nightmare #1 (Danny Davis).

=== Continental Wrestling Association (1985) ===
A now veteran Johnny Rich returned to his original promotion in June 1985, teaming with Gino Della Serra in his first match in an unsuccessful effort against The Kiwi Sheepherders (The Bushwhackers) on June 18. The time his stint was brief, and he left the promotion at the end of the month.

=== Continental Championship Wrestling (1985–1986) ===
Johnny Rich jumped to CCW (Continential Championship Wrestling) on July 1st and immediately resumed his teaming with Tommy Rich. He also reformed The RAT Patrol following the Tonga Kid's departure for the World Wrestling Federation, replacing his former partner with Steve Armstrong. His teaming with Tommy Rich and Steve Armstrong dominated the coming months of Johnny's career, and on November 11 the Riches defeated The Nightmares to win the NWA Southeastern Tag Team championship. Their reign would only last a week, as the Nightmares regained the titles at a subsequent event in Birmingham, AL. On December 25 the Riches defeated the Nightmares in a hair versus masks match, and on February 17, 1986 the Riches regained the championship. They would hold the titles until March 1, 1985 when they were defeated by Jimmy Golden & Robert Fuller. The Riches would continue to feud with Golden and Fuller for several months that year.

On August 25, 1986 Johnny Rich was defeated by Tom Pritchard in a loser leaves town match.

=== American Wrestling Association (1986) ===
On September 21, 1986 Johnny Rich made his debut for the AWA, defeating Stoney Burke. Rich was undefeated during his time in the promotion, winning encounters with Bobby Douglas, Brian Knobbs and Rick Gantner.

=== Continental Championship Wrestling (1986–1987) ===
Four months after falling in his loser leaves town match, Rich returned to CCW on December 17, defeating The Cuban Assassin in a televised match. Rich enjoyed success in his return, defeating Mike Golden and The New Guinea Man Eater in matches in 1987.

=== Southern Championship Wrestling (1988) ===
In January 1988 the Riches resumed their partnership, defeating Steve Lawler and The Nightmare at an event in Marietta, GA. The duo had strong success during their SCW run.

=== Continental Championship Wrestling (1988–1989) ===
Johnny Rich returned again to CCW in July 1988 and began teaming with Davey Rich (David Haskins), who was billed as his cousin. Dubbed "The Party Patrol", the Riches battled The Rock 'n' Roll RPMs (Mike Davis & Tommy Lane) to a draw in a match on July 21, 1988 in Johnson City, TN. The duo continued their partnership through the remainder of 1988, and on February 17, 1989 they defeated Jerry Stubbs & The Dirty White Boy to win the CWF Tag Team Championship. They would hold the titles until May 5, 1989 where they lost the championships to Masahiro Chono & Mike Davis.

=== World Championship Wrestling (1989–1994) ===
Johnny Rich then jumped to WCW, making his debut on NWA Main Event in a losing effort to Terry Funk on June 4, 1989 and was taken out on a stretcher after being piledriven on the floor. Davey Rich quickly joined him, and the Riches faced The Skyscrapers in their WCW debut on July 14, 1989 in Memphis, TN. On the July 22nd edition of World Championship Wrestling Johnny and Davey Rich teamed with Tommy Rich to defeat George South, Lee Scott, & Trent Knight. A week later on World Championship Wrestling the Riches trio was defeated by The Skycrapers and Norman. The Riches would go on to face the Skyscrapers in house show matches before Davey Rich left the promotion.

Now wrestling as a singles performer, Johnny Rich would lose to Bam Bam Bigelow on June 21, 1990 at a house show. On April 12, 1991 he faced NWA World Heavyweight Champion Ric Flair on WCW Pro but was defeated. On June 12, 1991 Rich was defeated by Oz (Kevin Nash) at the Clash of the Champions XV. On July 1st he earned a non-title shot against WCW World Television Champion Steve Austin but was pinned.

Rich entered a tournament to crown the WCW World Lightweight Championship and was defeated by Richard Morton (Ricky Morton) in the quarterfinals on WCW Worldwide on August 24, 1991. On August 6 (for a September 1 airing), he teamed with Larry Santo in a losing effort to The Hardline Collection Agency (Dick Murdoch and Dick Slaytor). On August 12 he gained his first WCW victory of the year, defeating Axl Rotten in the latter's WCW debut.

On October 27, 1991 he made his PPV debut. Donning a mask along with Joey Maggs and wrestling as The Creatures, the duo were defeated by Big Josh and PN News at Halloween Havoc 91 in Chattanooga, TN. The would be the first of several matches where Rich teamed with Maggs. Johnny Rich next faced WCW United States Champion Rick Rude on the November 23, 1991 episode of WCW Worldwide. On the December 21 episode of World Championship Wrestling he was defeated by Dallas Page and sustained a broken nose.

Rich began 1992 on WCW Worldwide on February 15 where he teamed once more – this time unmasked – with Joey Maggs in a match against WCW World Tag-Team Champions Arn Anderson & Bobby Eaton. On May 30 on WCW Worldwide Johnny Rich was defeated by Cactus Jack. On July 25, 1992 he teamed with The Italian Stallion in an unsuccessful effort against NWA/WCW World Tag-Team Champions Terry Gordy & Steve Williams.

On January 16, 1993 Rich teamed once more with Joey Maggs in a match against the newly arrived Wrecking Crew on WCW World Championship Wrestling. A week later Rich would face another new arrival in Chris Benoit. Rich returned to face Dallas Page in a losing effort on September 17, 1994 edition of WCW Worldwide.

=== Universal Wrestling Federation (1990) ===
Johnny Rich had a very brief stint in Herb Abrams' Universal Wrestling Federation during his time in WCW. Wrestling as "The Intern", Johnny Rich would lose to Paul Orndorff and Don Muraco at a taping on December 6, 1990.

=== Smoky Mountain Wrestling (1992) ===
While Rich's appearances in WCW became sporadic, he enjoyed a resurgence in Jim Cornette's new Smoky Mountain Wrestling promotion. Teaming once more with Davey Rich, the duo made their debut on March 12, 1992 where they were defeated in the quarterfinals for the SMW Tag-Team Championship by Rip Morgan and Jack Victory. Wrestling as The Party Patrol once more, they faced winners of the tournament The Heavenly Bodies on May 22, 1992 at Volunteer Slam.

=== Later appearances (1995–2007) ===
Johnny Rich would team with Davey Rich once more on July 22, 1995 at an event for Tennessee Mountain Wrestling where they faced the World Famous Spoilers. That would be Rich's last recorded event for twelve years.

He then returned on February 11, 2007 in NWA Indiana, teaming with Chase Richards to defeat Brandon Krueger & D-Von Fury. He wrestled several more times that year, with his final match coming on November 21, 2007 when he teamed with Justin Andrews, Marc Houston & Martin Fernandez to defeat Disco Stu, Dustin Frost, Luis Rojas & Niko Kilauea. After this, Johnny Rich retired.

== Championships and accomplishments ==
- Southeastern Championship Wrestling/Continental Championship Wrestling
  - NWA Southeast United States Junior Heavyweight Championship (1 time)
  - NWA Southeastern Tag Team Championship (6 times) - with Tonga Kid (3), Steve Armstrong (1) and Tommy Rich (2)
  - NWA Alabama Heavyweight Championship (1 time)
  - AWA Southern Tag Team Championship (1 time) - with Davey Rich
- USA Wrestling
  - USA Tag Team Championship (1 time) - with Davey Rich
