= Davey Rich =

American professional wrestler (born 1962)

Personal information
- Born: Davey Haskins; October 30, 1962 (age 64) Memphis, Tennessee, U.S.

Professional wrestling career
- Ring name(s): Davey Rich; Dave Haskins; David Haskins
- Billed height: 6 ft 0 in (1.83 m)
- Billed weight: 235 lb (107 kg)
- Trained by: Don Bass
- Debut: 1985
- Retired: 2019

David Haskins (born October 30, 1962) is an American retired professional wrestler better known by his ring name Davey Rich. He wrestled for World Championship Wrestling in the late 1980s, Universal Wrestling Federation, Continental Wrestling Association in Memphis, Georgia Championship Wrestling and other Southern promotions, as well as the World Wrestling Federation.

== Professional wrestling career ==
=== Continental Wrestling Association (1985–1987) ===
Haskins made his debut on January 15, 1985 at a house show in Louisville, KY, facing off against Johnny Wilhoit in a losing effort. The rookie was winless in his initial months, losing to Eddie Gilbert, The Interns, Jerry Bryant, and Ron Starr. His first success came on March 12, when he battled Angelo Poffo to a time limit draw. Haskins would quickly commence another losing streak that saw him defeated by Randy Savage, Mr. Wrestling, and Kareem Muhammad before he finally secured his first victory when he defeated JR Hogg at an event that was held in Louisville, KY on April 30, 1985.

After having a lopsided win loss record his rookie year, Haskins secured an upset victory when he teamed with Frank Morell to defeat The MOD Squad on CWA television on April 19, 1986. Later that spring he formed a tag-team with Tracy Smothers and would wrestle The MOD Squad in subsequent matches, as well as Akio Sato & Tarzan Goto. On August 11, 1986 he entered a tournamed to crown the NWA Mid-America Heavyweight Title but was eliminated by Ron Sexton in the quarter finals.

=== Universal Wrestling Federation (1987) ===
Haskins jumped the Bill Watts's Universal Wrestling Federation, making his debut on May 16, 1987 on UWF television and defeating Gary Young via disqualification. He quickly formed a tag-team with Steve Cox, and on June 11 unsuccessfully challenged UWF Tag-Team Champions The Lightning Express at an event in Thibodaux, Louisiana. In June he pivoted to a new team, this time tagging with Shane Douglas in matches against Shaska Whatley & The Enforcer (Doug Gilvert). Later that summer Haskins & Douglas would travel to Jim Crockett Promotions, where they participated in the NWA Great American Bash Tour. While on loan from the UWF, the duo defeated Bob Bradley & The Enforcer and well as Shaska Whatley & The Enforcer.

On August 1, 1987 at the UWF Superdome Extravaganza, Haskins returned to singles competition and defeated Mike Boyette. As the fall began and Jim Crockett Promotions commenced with the purchasing of the UWF, Haskins defeated The Enforcer in numerous singles matches, but was unable to best Terry Taylor or Rick Steiner. However on his final UWF match on October 25, 1987, Haskins defeated Taylor at an event in Jonesboro, AR.

=== Continental Championship Wrestling (1988–1989) ===
While making appearances for the CWA as Davey haskins, he began wrestling in Continental Championship Wrestling where he was redubbed Davey Rich, a cousin of Johnny Rich. His debut came on July 21, 1988 where he defeated Bill Dundee by disqualification at an event in Johnson City, TN. He began teaming with Johnny Rich as "The Party Patrol. The duo battled The Rock 'n' Roll RPMs (Mike Davis & Tommy Lane) to a draw in a match on July 21, 1988 in Johnson City, TN. The duo continued their partnership through the remainder of 1988, and on February 17, 1989 they defeated Jerry Stubbs & The Dirty White Boy to win the CWF Tag Team Championship. They would hold the titles until May 5, 1989 where they lost the championships to Masahiro Chono & Mike Davis.

=== World Championship Wrestling (1989) ===
Both Davey and Johnny Rich would then jump to WCW. Haskins made his debut first, appearing on NWA Main Event in a losing effort to Terry Funk on May 10, 1989 and was taken out on a stretcher after being piledriven on the floor. Johnny Rich quickly joined him (and would also do a stretcher job to Funk). The Riches faced The Skyscrapers in their WCW debut on July 14, 1989 in Memphis, TN. On the July 22nd edition of World Championship Wrestling Johnny and Davey Rich teamed with Tommy Rich to defeat George South, Lee Scott, & Trent Knight. A week later on World Championship Wrestling the Riches trio was defeated by The Skycrapers and Norman. The Riches would go on to face the Skyscrapers in house show matches during the summer. On August 5, 1989 the Riches faced The Samoan Swat Team on NWA Pro, after which Davey Rich left the promotion.

=== Continental Wrestling Federation (1990) ===
Haskins jumped to the Continental Wrestling Federation in November 1989, where he would face Dennis Condrey in an "I Quit" match.

=== Smoky Mountain Wrestling (1992) ===
Following a sabbatical, Haskins resurfaced in Jim Cornette's new Smoky Mountain Wrestling promotion. Teaming once more with Johnny Rich, the duo made their debut on March 12, 1992 where they were defeated in the quarterfinals for the SMW Tag-Team Championship by The Maulers (Rip Morgan and Jack Victory). Wrestling as The Party Patrol once more, they faced winners of the tournament The Heavenly Bodies on May 22, 1992 at Volunteer Slam.

=== World Championship Wrestling (1993–1995) ===
Both Davey and Johnny Rich returned to WCW in 1993, although this time the two on-screen cousins did not team together. Haskins made his return on June 28, 1993 (for the August 9th episode of WCW Main Event), where he was defeated by Rick Rude. He would later appear on WCW WorldWide episodes, facing the newly arrived Nasty Boys in tag-team competition.

Rich began 1994 with a loss to Lord Steven Regal on WCW Saturday Night, and would also fall to Jean Paul Levesque (Hunter Hearst Helmsley) at the same taping. He would later face The Honkytonk Man on the December 17th episode of WCW Worldwide. On January 8, 1995 he was defeated by The Blacktop Bully on WCW Saturday Night, and would go on to face Paul Roman and Kevin Sullivan later that month.

=== United States Wrestling Association (1995–1997) ===
Haskins then jumped to the USWA. Dropping the "Davey Rich" name for the first time since 1988, he made his debut as David Haskins and defeated Jack Hammer on March 11. This was quickly followed by wins over The Spellbinder, Crusher Bones, The Yellow Jacket, and Gorgeous George III. Haskins also formed a tag-team with Marcus Dupree, defeating Jack Hammer & Crusher Bones in multiple encounters.

On April 24, 1995 he competed in a battle royal in Memphis, TN to determine the Number 1 contender to the USWA World Heavyweight Championship, a match ultimately won by Scott Studd. The same night he sustained his first USWA loss when he teamed with Kenny Kendall in a losing effort to Chad Fortune & Eric Watts (Team Tekno 2000). In May 1995 he began a house show program with Johnny Rotten, trading victories.

Emeshed in the mid-card, Haskins would face Brian Lee, The Headbangers, Motley Cruz, and Bill Dundee amongst others over the remainder of 1995 and into 1996. His final appearance came on March 22, 1997 when he defeated Steve Boz in Memphis, TN.

=== World Wrestling Federation (1995–1997) ===
While competing in the USWA, Haskins would also make numerous appearances as an for the World Wrestling Federation. This was facilitated by the talent sharing agreement between the two companies that began in 1992. Haskins made his WWF debut on the June 10, 1995 edition of WWF Superstars, where he was defeated by Hakushi by countout. Two days later he made his first Monday Night RAW appearance, where he was defeated by Kama. Haskins would go on to wrestle Mable, Gary Scott, and Jean Pierre Lafitte that summer. He also competed on the final WWF Wrestling Challenge tv taping, where he faced Tatanka.

Haskins began 1996 with a defeat on March 9 to Davey Boy Smith on WWF Superstars. He next appeared on May 18 on the same program in a match against Ahmed Johnson. During the match, announcer Jim Ross played up the fact that Haskins had more experience than his opponent. In a dark match at the August 19, 1996 taping of Monday Night RAW, Haskins faced Dwayne Johnson, the latter wrestling as "Flex Kavana" months before his debut as Rocky Miavia. Haskins would later compete against Hunter Hearst Helmsley, Crush, Justin Bradshaw, and The Sultan.

On March 19, 1997 Haskins faced off against former USWA tag-team partner Tony Williams in a dark match at a Monday Night RAW taping in Mobile, AL, a match that the latter won. Later that evening he would face Jesse James in a match that would air on Shotgun Saturday Night.

=== World Championship Wrestling (1997) ===
Haskins made a return on July 8, 1997, wrestling Dave Taylor on WCW Saturday Night. He would leave the sport after this match, entering a sabbatical that would last eleven years.

=== Later Career (2008–2019) ===
After over a decade away from the sport, Haskins returned to competition for Southern States Wrestling's SSW A Night To Remember 2008 event. Wrestling once again as "Davey Rich', he defeated Jimmy Golden at the event in Kingsport, TN on June 6, 2008. On June 16, 2013 he teamed with Stan Sierra to defeat Jimmy Golden & Tojo Yammamoto Jr at the Brad Armstrong Memorial Event. On may 14, 2016 he defeated Tracy Smothers at a Continental Championship Wrestling event in Dothan, AL. On November 4, 2017 his comeback continued, when he traveled to Southern Legacy Wrestling to defeat Kongo in Munford, AL. On April 27, 2019 Haskins faced Paul Lee for the JCP Southeastern Heavyweight Championship, but was unable to secure the title.

== Championships and accomplishments ==
- Continental Wrestling Federation
  - CWF Tag Team Championship (1 time) – with Johnny Rich
