= Ranger Ross =

American professional wrestler (born 1959)

Personal information
- Born: Robert Lee Ross Jr. July 15, 1959 (age 67) Acworth, Georgia, U.S.

Professional wrestling career
- Ring name(s): The Pearl; Ranger Ross
- Billed height: 5 ft 10 in (178 cm)
- Billed weight: 235 lb (107 kg)
- Billed from: Acworth, Georgia
- Trained by: Ted Allen
- Debut: 1986
- Retired: 2007
- Military service
- Allegiance: United States
- Branch: United States Army
- Unit: 75th Ranger Regiment
- Conflicts: Operation Urgent Fury

Robert Lee Ross Jr. (born July 15, 1959) is an American former professional wrestler and former United States Army Ranger known by his ring name, Ranger Ross. Ross is best known for his appearances with Jim Crockett Promotions and World Championship Wrestling in the late 1980s and early 1990s. He also wrestled with All Japan Pro Wrestling, Mid-Atlantic Championship Wrestling, and Continental Championship Wrestling. Ross got his start at Deep South Championship Wrestling.

== Military career ==
After graduating high school, Ross enlisted in the United States Army, where he was trained as a paratrooper, graduated Ranger School and eventually becoming a member of the 75th Ranger Regiment. During his eight-year military career, Ross participated in several combat and rescue missions including Operation Urgent Fury before becoming a professional wrestler.

== Professional wrestling career ==
=== Early career (1986-1989) ===
Ross made his professional wrestling debut in 1986 under the ring name "Ranger Ross".

Ross wrestled for the Knoxville, Tennessee-based promotion Continental Championship Wrestling, where he briefly held the NWA Alabama Heavyweight Championship defeating Moondog Spot in January 1988 before losing the title to Jonathan Boyd in Birmingham, Alabama on January 11, 1988.

Ross also wrestled for the Atlanta, Georgia-based promotion Southern Championship Wrestling. He held the SCW Tag Team Championship twice in 1988 - once with Joey Maggs and once with Mr. Wrestling II.

=== Jim Crockett Promotions/World Championship Wrestling (1989-1991) ===
Ross debuted in Jim Crockett Promotions in 1989. He had a short-lived feud with The Iron Sheik defeating him by disqualification at Clash of the Champions VI on April 2, 1989. Prior to the match, he had made his entrance by rappelling 300 feet from the top of The Superdome. Later that month he would team with Randy Rose against Jack Victory and Rip Morgan and, in singles competition, faced The Great Muta and Butch Reed losing to Reed at Wrestlewar '89 on May 7. On May 23, he and Ron Simmons would later participate in the NWA World Tag Team Championship tournament, losing to the Samoan Swat Team in the opening rounds. Ross began feuding with Simmons soon after. Defeating The Terrorist at Clash of the Champions VII in Fort Bragg, North Carolina, on June 14, he was eliminated in the two-ring battle royal by former tag team partner Ron Simmons (Ross would later eliminate Simmons while in the second ring before being eliminated by Dan Spivey) at the Great American Bash on July 23 Although losing to Sid Vicious at Clash of the Champions VIII on September 12, he would later feud with The Cuban Assassin as well as defeating Rusty Riddle and Bob Emery during the next several weeks. Facing Pat Rose on December 2, he also teamed with various partners during the end of the year teaming with Eddie Gilbert against The Galaxians on December 23 and with "Wildfire" Tommy Rich against Cactus Jack and Ned Brady on December 30, 1989. During the match, Cactus Jack would turn on Ned Brady, giving Ross and Tommy Rich the victory.

During the next two years, he would wrestle for the promotion on a limited basis losing to Mike Rotunda at a house show in Hammond, Indiana, on January 11, 1990. Several months later he fought to a time limit draw against Jack Victory at the Philadelphia Civic Center in Philadelphia, Pennsylvania, on April 7 before losing to Abdullah the Butcher in Augusta, Georgia, later that month. While touring Japan, he would team with Abdullah the Butcher facing Shohei Baba and Rusher Kimura at an event for All Japan Pro Wrestling on May 26. In one of his last appearances, he later defeated El Cubano at Clash of the Champions XIV on January 30, 1991.

=== Departure from WCW and arrest ===
After leaving WCW on bad terms, he later filed a discrimination suit against the organization. Working as private investigator as well as a part-time probation officer in Acworth during the early 1990s, he also collected fines and probation fees in the local area.

In February 1996, Ross was arrested at his home in Acworth and formally charged with bank robbery as the "Motorcycle Bandit", an unidentified man who made his escape on a Honda motorcycle. Following the robbery of a bank in downtown Acworth, Ross surrendered to federal agents on February 9.

=== Later career (2004-2007) ===
In early 2004, he began wrestling for several Southeastern independent promotions including appearances the North American Wrestling Alliance and Wrestling Xtreme Overload teaming with Lash LeRoux & Danny Dollar in a 6-man tag team match and later on teamed with Lash LeRoux defeated The Turbulators by disqualification at a televised event for Wrestling Xtreme Overload on August 21, 2004.

In 2005, he defeated Alan Martin at a Wrestle Inc. event on August 12 and, the following night, lost to Rainman in a four-way match with Brad Armstrong and Simon Sermon at an event for Pro Wrestling Evolution. During the next two months, he and Leroux would also win the New Age Championship Wrestling Tag Team titles and, the following month, teamed with "Mr. USA" Tony Atlas, The Patriot and The Stro defeating Ivan Koloff's Russian Army. Returning to Pro Wrestling Evolution in early 2006, Ross defeated Adam Raddick by disqualification on April 22 and, at an event for TNT Pro Wrestling, teamed with Ken Aldridge to defeat Kamala and Mr. Terrific on May 6, 2006.

In January 2007, Ranger Ross tagged with his former enemy and his trainer: "The Nightmare" Ted Allen in his final match at Georgia Wrestling Promotions in Ellijay Georgia. They faced and beat an up-and-coming tag team known as The VIP (Violence In Progress) which consists of Tommy Lee and Loco Motive.

== Personal life ==
Ross was born in Acworth, Georgia. He attended North Cobb High School, where he wrestled, played basketball and football.

After leaving WCW he started his own business.

Ross attended seminary and is in the ministry. Ross is married and still lives in Georgia where he is a small business owner. Ranger Ross is very involved with many charities, including the MDA charity in which he appears yearly at their summer camp in Georgia.

Ross is an Elder at Mission for Life Church in Kennesaw, Georgia.

== Championships and accomplishments ==
- Continental Championship Wrestling
  - NWA Alabama Heavyweight Championship (1 time)
- Deep South Wrestling
  - Deep South Heavyweight Championship (1 times)
- Peach State Wrestling
  - PSW United States Heavyweight Championship (1 time)
- Pro Wrestling Illustrated
  - PWI ranked him # 231 of the 500 best singles wrestlers of the PWI 500 in 1991
- Southern Championship Wrestling
  - SCW Tag Team Championship (2 times) - with Joey Maggs (1) and Mr. Wrestling II (1)
