= Joey Maggs =

American professional wrestler (1967–2006)

Personal information
- Born: Joseph Magliano; September 29, 1967 Baltimore, Maryland, U.S.
- Died: October 15, 2006 (aged 39) Baltimore, Maryland, U.S.

Professional wrestling career
- Ring name(s): Joey Knight; Joey Maggliano; Joey Maggs; The Magnificent Magliano; Creature 1
- Billed height: 6 ft 0 in (1.83 m)
- Billed weight: 250 lb (110 kg; 18 st)
- Debut: 1987
- Retired: 1998

Joseph Magliano (September 29, 1967 – October 15, 2006), better known by the ring name "Jumping" Joey Maggs, was an American professional wrestler. He was best known for his appearances with World Championship Wrestling (WCW) from 1991 to 1998.

== Professional wrestling career ==
=== Early career (1987–1990) ===
Magliano made his professional debut in 1987 for Deep South Wrestling (later Southern Championship Wrestling), where he won the promotion's Southern Heavyweight Championship twice. Early in his career, he wrestled as "Hotshot" Joey Knight in a tag team with Ricky Lawless known as The Heavy Metal Connection. Magliano competed for promotions in Mississippi and Louisiana before finding success in the Memphis-based United States Wrestling Association during the early 1990s.

=== United States Wrestling Association (1990–1991) ===
In mid-1990, Magliano made his debut for the USWA, winning the USWA World Tag Team Championship with Rex King from the Dirty White Boys (Tony Anthony and Tom Burton) on June 23. They held the titles until August 11, when they dropped it to Brian Lee and Don Harris. Magliano wrestled in singles competition over the next few months, but often came up short against the likes of King Cobra, Doug Gilbert, MC Jammer, and Danny Davis. During his last months in the promotion, he briefly held the USWA Junior Heavyweight Championship, winning it from Davis in December before losing it back to him on January 6, 1991.

=== World Championship Wrestling (1991–1998) ===
He made his debut as "Jumping" Joey Maggs in World Championship Wrestling (WCW) in January 1991, facing Tom Zenk in Dothan, Alabama. Less than a month after his debut on January 30, Maggs faced Sid Vicious at Clash of the Champions XIV in a losing effort. On June 12, he challenged "Stunning" Steve Austin for the WCW World Television Championship at Clash of the Champions XV, but was defeated. That same month, Maggs entered the WCW Light Heavyweight Championship Tournament, losing to Badstreet in the opening rounds on August 31. On October 27 at Halloween Havoc, Maggs teamed with Johnny Rich under masks as The Creatures, losing to Big Josh and P. N. News.

Maggs had a brief stint with Smoky Mountain Wrestling in 1992, where he and former rival Danny Davis participated in an eight-team tag team championship tournament for the vacant SMW Tag Team Championship on April 23. They scored an upset victory over Ivan and Vladimir Koloff in the opening rounds before being eliminated by the Heavenly Bodies in the semi-finals. The following month on May 22, Maggs and Hector Guerrero defeated Rip Rogers and Barry Horowitz at the supercard Volunteer Slam.

In late 1995, Maggs acquired Teddy Long as his manager. He defeated Disco Inferno on January 1, 1996, and five days later, teamed with Frankie Lancaster and Men at Work in a loss to The Four Horsemen (Ric Flair, Arn Anderson, Brian Pillman, and Chris Benoit) in a four-man tag team match on WCW Pro. Maggs entered a feud with V.K. Wallstreet on January 27 after winning their match by disqualification. On February 11 at SuperBrawl VI, Maggs and Sgt. Craig Pittman lost to Wallsteet and Big Bubba Rogers in a tag team match. Wallstreet would defeat Maggs in a rematch on March 6, ending their feud.

While still making appearances for WCW, Magliano began competing part-time in various independent promotions during the late 1990s, including the Mid-Eastern Wrestling Federation. There, he defeated Quinn Nash for the MEWF Mid-Atlantic Championship on September 17, 1997. On February 14, 1998, Maggs wrestled his final match in WCW and of his career on WCW WorldWide, where he lost to Bill Goldberg.

=== World Wrestling Federation (1992–1994) ===
Maggs first appeared for the World Wrestling Federation in 1992, facing Rick "The Model" Martel on SummerSlam Spectacular, Ric Flair on Superstars and Razor Ramon on WWF Wrestling Challenge. On July 5, 1993, Maggs lost to Bam Bam Bigelow on Monday Night Raw. His last match for the company was a loss to Duke Droese on the May 24, 1994 edition of Wrestling Challenge.

=== Retirement ===
Magliano retired from professional wrestling in 1998 due to a nagging shoulder injury and moved back to Maryland, where he enrolled in flight school to become a cargo pilot.

== Death ==
In October 2006, Magliano died of cardiac arrest at the age of 39.

== Championships and accomplishments ==
- Mid-Eastern Wrestling Federation
  - MEWF Mid-Atlantic Championship (1 time)
- Pro Wrestling Illustrated
  - PWI ranked him # 337 of the 500 best singles wrestlers of the PWI 500 in 1991.
- Southern Championship Wrestling (Buck Robley)
  - SCW Southern Heavyweight Championship (2 times)
- Southern Championship Wrestling (Jerry Blackwell)
  - SCW Tag Team Championship (2 times) - with Tommy Rich (1) and Ranger Ross (1)
- United States Wrestling Association
  - USWA Junior Heavyweight Championship (1 time)
  - USWA World Tag Team Championship (1 time) – with Rex King

== See also ==
- List of premature professional wrestling deaths
