= Ted Allen (wrestler) =

American professional wrestler (1955 – 2010)

Personal information
- Born: Ted Allen Lipscomb; November 17, 1955 Cartersville, Georgia
- Died: August 19, 2010 (aged 54) Cartersville, Georgia, United States

Professional wrestling career
- Ring name(s): Ted Allen; Nightmare; Nightmare #2; Power Ranger; Wrestler; MX-1
- Billed height: 5 ft 10 in (178 cm)
- Billed weight: 210 lb (95 kg)
- Debut: 1975

Ted Allen Lipscomb (November 17, 1955 – August 19, 2010) was an American professional wrestler known as "Nightmare" Ted Allen who worked in the Southern Territories.

== Professional wrestling career ==
Allen began wrestling in 1975 for Georgia Championship Wrestling. He also worked for Continental Championship Wrestling, NWA Mid-America, Continental Wrestling Association and Stampede Wrestling.

From 1993 to 1995 Allen worked for Smoky Mountain Wrestling.

His last match was on August 5, 2010, when he lost to his student, Kyle Matthews by disqualification.

== Death ==
Allen died from a heart attack at his home in Cartesville, Georgia at 54.

From 2011 to 2012 memorial events A Nightmare To Remember were held by the LN Promotions in Villa Rica, Georgia. The proceeds from the event were donated to Allen's mother, Karen Allen, and the Gulf Coast Wrestlers Reunion's "Ted Allen Sunshine Fund". The inaugural show raised over $56,000. Additional concessions sales went towards Bay Springs Middle School in Villa Rica, Georgia.

The event was covered by WXIA in Atlanta. Terry Lawler, credited as "the driving force behind the event", was voted by his peers to receive the Ted Allen Mentorship Award (2011) from the GeorgiaWrestlingHistory.com website. In a live report of the final "Nightmare To Remember", Larry Goodman of GWH.com praised the event calling it "a sweet show, befitting the man it honored" with the event "filled with laughter and warm feelings, both in the arena and in the locker room".

== Legacy ==
On October 1, 2016, Allen was inducted into the Alabama Professional Wrestling Hall Of Fame.

Allen trained many wrestlers; Arn Anderson, Big Boss Man, Scotty Riggs, Kyle Matthews and others.

== Championships and accomplishments ==
- Great Championship Wrestling
  - GCW United States Junior Heavyweight Championship (2 times)
  - GCW Tag Team Championship – with Sonny Siaki
