= Joe Pedicino =

American wrestling announcer (1949–2020)

Personal information
- Born: October 4, 1949 New York City, United States
- Died: April 12, 2020 (aged 70)

Professional wrestling career
- Ring name: "The Round Mound of Sound" Joe Pedicino
- Billed from: Atlanta, Georgia
- Debut: 1986
- Retired: 1994

Joe Pedicino (October 4, 1949 – April 12, 2020) was an American professional wrestling announcer, commentator, promoter, television and radio producer. He was a well-known on-air personality in regional territories of the Southern United States during the 1980s, being an announcer and commentator for Jim Crockett Promotions and World Championship Wrestling, and as host of the nationally syndicated Superstars of Wrestling with his wife Boni Blackstone and Gordon Solie from 1986 to 1992.

The series, created and produced by Pedicino, aired eight hours of wrestling from around the country and was the first to provide national coverage of the National Wrestling Alliance as well as from Puerto Rico and Japan. He and Solie also hosted a popular segment on the show, "Pro Wrestling This Week", which discussed the then current news from the "Big Three" (AWA, NWA and the WWF) and regional promotions. Scott Hudson and Steve Prazak, both former WCW announcers, were fans of the show and given their first big break by Pedicino when he began promoting events in the late 1980s. Bill Apter, editor of Pro Wrestling Illustrated, has also credited Pedicino for considerably raising his profile among wrestling fans due to his weekly segment.

He was also the booker and part owner of the Global Wrestling Federation with former USWA commentator Max Andrews, as well as part of the announcing team for GWF Wrestling Superstars on ESPN, and had a similar role in the short-lived Ladies Professional Wrestling Association. Popularly known as the "round mound of sound", Pedicino has been compared to some of the top commentators of the mid-to late 1980s and is regarded as one of the most recognizable personalities during the final years of the "territory era". Brian Westcott, wrestling historian and writer, has called Pedicino one of his all-time favorite play-by-play/color commentators.

Following his retirement from wrestling, Pedicino owned and operated local radio stations based in central Georgia, as well as general sales manager for WCNN radio Atlanta. Pedicino was also a management consultant for several major media companies including Turner Broadcasting, Susquehanna Broadcasting and Clear Channel Broadcasting. He and his wife also began a successful publishing company, Food Fax, which puts out six annual specialty advertising guides. Their company, the first to offer such service, started out sending fax listings to office workers of lunch menus and daily specials from more than 1,000 local restaurants in Cobb County, Georgia.

== Biography ==
=== Early career ===
Joe Pedicino was born in New York City on October 4, 1949, and moved to Atlanta, Georgia with his family three years later. He began working in radio at age 14, attended Georgia State University, and later graduated from the RAB School at University of Pennsylvania's Wharton Business School. In August 1985, Pedicino joined the sales staff at the Atlanta-based WATL TV 36. In early-1986, Pedicino developed a "new concept" wrestling program for the station. The show, Superstars of Wrestling, would feature over eight hours of professional wrestling from National Wrestling Alliance territories throughout the United States as well as from Puerto Rico and Japan. It was also the earliest U.S. television show to regularly broadcast Japanese puroresu and joshi wrestling as part of the Fuji Television Network's efforts to develop a market in the American television industry.

=== Superstars of Wrestling ===
The show debuted in May 1985, airing on Saturday nights from 8:00 pm to 3:00 am, was a ratings success. Eight different wrestling organizations from as far away as Dallas, Texas and Birmingham, Alabama were broadcast during its first year. These would later include the Continental Wrestling Association, Deep South Championship Wrestling, Mid-South Wrestling and World Class Championship Wrestling as well as events from around the world. Because the show never disclosed that the wrestling being shown was pre-taped, with Pedicino adding commentary later on, fans watching the show at home would often travel to the studio hoping to attend the show. In November, twenty fans drove in a van all the way from Snellville, Georgia to the locked studio in downtown Atlanta only to be turned away by security.

Pedicino served as both executive producer and host throughout its near seven-year run. He was joined by fellow ring announcer Rhubarb Jones and 21-year-old Boni Blackstone, who later became his wife. Blackstone had been one of 20 girls, chosen out of a total of 70, to become Pedicino's co-host. Gordon Solie, a popular wrestling announcer, also joined the show as a regular color commentator. Solie would also host a featured segment with Pedicino, "Pro Wrestling This Week", which discussed wrestling news from around the country. They were sometimes joined by Bill Apter, who had his own segment, and co-produced interview segments with Pro Wrestling Illustrated featuring many wrestling stars of the 1980s. Apter's appearances, as well as those on TBS, considerably raised his profile among wrestling fans of the era.

The show was watched in over 20 major television markets in its first year. By the summer of 1987, the show broadcast in 40 cities, including New York City, Los Angeles and Chicago, and eventually syndicated throughout the country. Pedicino and Blackstone became seen as local celebrities in Atlanta but Pedicino brushed off the attention regarding themselves as "wrestling fans who got lucky". Earlier that year, he and Blackstone hosted the three-day 20th annual Miller High Life World of Wheels car show held at Atlanta's World Congress Center. Sponsored by the National Automotive Parts Association, the event displayed over 500 of the most expensive custom designed antique vehicles in the world including the 18-wheel Volvo "Elvis' Eldorado". French entertainer "Miss World of Wheels" Danielle Chevalier and wrestling valet Miss Sunshine of The Fabulous Freebirds were also at the event. In 1988, he became involved with the Southern Championship Training Center, a rival training facility of Jody Hamilton's American Academy of Professional Wrestling, in Cumming, Georgia by helping promote the school.

On July 17, 1988, Pedicino and Blackstone hosted a two-hour wrestling show, "Wrestlethon '88", which was broadcast nationwide via satellite by Fox Broadcasting as part of The Late Show. This was the third annual Wrestlethon and had been a successful fundraiser in past years. The first show raised an estimated $10,000 and helped save the life of teenager Deloris Wadsworth who needed a liver transplant. The second show raised between $12,000-$13,000 for wounded police officers J.J. Biello and Richard Williams; the third show raised enough money to purchase 200-300 bulletproof vests of the 1,100 needed for the Atlanta Police Department. Four months later, Pedicino appeared with a number of media figures and television celebrities at a benefit show, "Celebrity Cookoff for a Cure", held by the Juvenile Diabetes Foundation at Benihana. Other participants included Atlanta Magazine editor Lee Walburn, Atlanta Business Chronicle editor Anita Sharpe, Creative Loafing publisher Deborah Eason and local WSB-TV personalities John Pruitt and Bebe Emerman.

=== Georgia All-Star Wrestling and marriage to Boni Blackstone ===
Pedicino started his own wrestling promotion, Georgia All-Star Wrestling, in 1989. Having been an announcer for Jim Crockett Promotions, Pedicino was able to bring in a number of former stars from around the region. Among these included Jimmy Holiday, Tony Zane, Billy Starr, John Michaels and Mr. Wrestling II, then working for Jody Hamilton's Deep South Championship Wrestling. Future WCW star Marcus Bagwell also made his debut in the promotion under the name Fabian.

In early-1990, he hired Scott Hudson and Steve Prazak as announcers for the promotion. According to Hudson in a later interview, both men had been fans of his show and they persuaded Pedicino to hire them for free after a poor performance given by the regular announcer at a show in Carrollton, Georgia. As Hudson and Prazak had prior experience in radio and television, they soon became valuable members of the promotion. Pedicino later brought the two with him when he became involved with the Global Wrestling Federation. He and Hudson were also given their own segment on Superstars of Wrestling, styled in a comedic "Laurel and Hardy" fashion, called "Point-Counterpoint" which was sometimes aired on ESPN for the GWF. Craig Johnson, then a play-by-play commentator for the United States Wrestling Association, was also hired by Pedicino as head announcer over other applicants including Chris Cruise and Eric Bischoff.

That same year, he and Blackstone became married. This came as a surprise, both to wrestling fans and the staff, as the two had a well-known kayfabe adversarial relationship on the show much like Gorilla Monsoon and Bobby "The Brain" Heenan on WWF Wrestling Challenge. Pedicino played the "straight man" of the team who teased and played pranks on Blackstone. The two would continue their routines off-camera, keeping even the studio in the dark, by driving home in separate cars and Blackstone addressing her then boyfriend as "Mr. Pedicino" in front of studio employees during the first two years of their relationship.

=== Global Wrestling Federation ===
With the close of Fritz von Erich's World Class Championship Wrestling the previous year, he and former USWA commissioner Max Andrews decided to start a new promotion and moved into the Dallas-area in June 1991. It was claimed that this new promotion, the Global Wrestling Federation, was an established wrestling organization that promoted events worldwide and intended to become a competitor of World Championship Wrestling and the World Wrestling Federation.

Pedicino and Andrews were originally backed by a supposed Nigerian businessman, Olu Oliami, who had offered to invest $10 million in the promotion. When the deal fell through, Pedicino instead went to the Overton family for assistance. The Overtons later backed out as well and Pedicino took on the bulk of the financial backing himself. By late 1991, he had signed a deal with ESPN to air GWF events from the Global Dome as well as purchasing the United States Wrestling Association's syndicated time slot from Jerry Jarrett providing additional television coverage for the GWF. Joined by Craig Johnson, Scott Hudson and Steve Prazak, Pedicino and his wife became part of the regular GWF broadcast team on ESPN. As well as being a major on-air personality for the promotion, Pedicino was also involved in a major storyline which saw him reveal GWF Commissioner Max Andrews as the unknown leader of the heel stable The Cartel (Rip Rogers, Cactus Jack, Scotty the Body and Makhan Singh).

In October 1991, Pedicino turned over his booking position to Eddie Gilbert. While television ratings improved under Gilbert, house show attendance dwindled due to declining business brought on by a series of scandals in the wrestling industry involving the World Wrestling Federation. The cost of maintaining the roster as well as television production costs slowly drained the promotion's finances. The financial situation became so serious that the promotion was forced to release Pedicino and Blackstone, Eddie Gilbert, Craig Johnson and other key GWF members on April 9, 1992. Pedicino sold his share of the promotion and the GWF eventually folded after going through a series of failed owners including Grey Pierson and Jim Crockett.

=== Retirement and later years ===
Back in Atlanta, creative differences eventually caused Pedicino and Solie to part ways and Pedicino decided to end Superstars of Wrestling in August 1992. He and Blackstone started their own business, Max Foods, that same year. The business initially began by publishing a two-page fax listing of 24 restaurants and their daily specials to office workers. The first company of its kind, the listing was sent out five nights a week to over 1,000 businesses in the Cobb County area. In 1993, Blackstone was brought to the WWF as an interviewer for several months while Pedicino joined Sgt. Slaughter, Jim Cornette and Ken Resnick as commentators in Ladies Professional Wrestling Association.

Although he considered bringing back Superstars of Wrestling, Pedicino instead distanced himself from professional wrestling and returned to the radio industry. He was hired as management consultant for several major media companies including Turner Broadcasting, Blair Broadcasting, Outlet Broadcasting, Susquehanna Broadcasting, and Clear Channel Broadcasting. He was also the owner and general manager of several Georgia-based radio stations, most notably WMKJ, and WMGP, and produced WTLK TV-14 infomercial "Shoppers' Showcase" with his wife prior to joining Legacy Media Holdings as vice president and chief marketing officer in 1996.

In August 2000, Pedicino and his wife Boni began hosting Pro Wrestling this Week on FOX Sports Radio, which ran on Sunday nights from 11:00 pm to 1:00 am, and later appeared together at the NWA 52nd Anniversary Show.

In July 2007, Pedicino bought WEKS, which was given approval by the Federal Communications Commission to increase its broadcasting range two months later. The country music station, originally only available in Griffin, Georgia, could then be heard on 92.5 FM in Troup, Meriwether, Coweta, Pike and Spalding counties.
