= Tommy Rich =

American professional wrestler (born 1956)

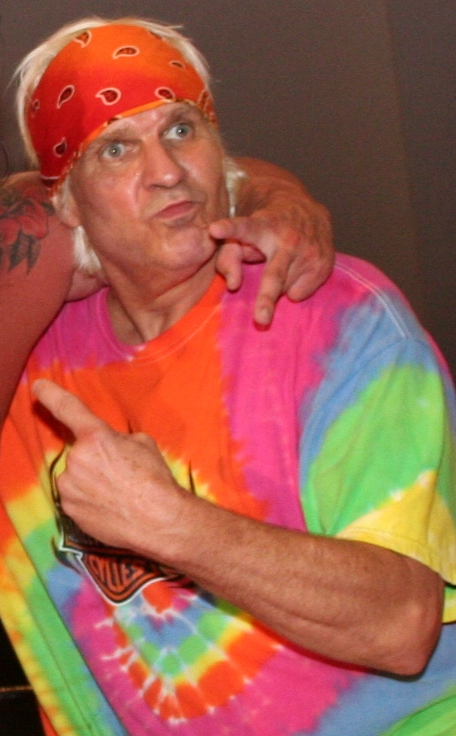
- Rich in 2013

Personal information
- Born: Thomas Richardson; July 26, 1956 (age 70) Hendersonville, Tennessee, U.S.
- Spouse: Terri Richardson
- Children: 3

Professional wrestling career
- Ring name(s): Mr. R Thomas Rich; Tommy "Wildfire" Rich; Tommy Richardson; The Big Don
- Billed height: 6 ft 0 in (183 cm)
- Billed weight: 235 lb (107 kg)
- Billed from: Hendersonville, Tennessee
- Trained by: Jerry Jarrett; Jerry Lawler; Dick Steinborn; Tojo Yamamoto
- Debut: 1974

Thomas Richardson (born July 26, 1956) is an American professional wrestler, better known by his ring name Tommy "Wildfire" Rich. He is a one time former National Wrestling Alliance World Heavyweight Champion and Smoky Mountain Wrestling Heavyweight Champion. He primarily appeared in Georgia Championship Wrestling and Memphis throughout the 1980s, as well as World Championship Wrestling, Smoky Mountain Wrestling and Extreme Championship Wrestling throughout the 1990s. He is a 1974 graduate of Hendersonville High School.

== Professional wrestling career ==
=== Early career (1974–1977) ===
Rich started wrestling in 1974 in the regional promotions in Tennessee after training with Jerry Jarrett.

=== Georgia Championship Wrestling (1977–1984) ===
Throughout the 1980s, he alternated his time between Tennessee, Georgia, and Alabama territories of the National Wrestling Alliance (NWA). He won dozens of NWA regional titles during this time. He is best known as one of the original stars of the TBS wrestling shows from the 1970s and 1980s. His bloody feuds with "Mad Dog" Buzz Sawyer, Ole Anderson, Ivan Koloff, The Fabulous Freebirds, and every other major heel to come through the Georgia territory made Rich one of the most popular wrestling stars of the period.

On April 27, 1981, in Augusta, Georgia, he won the NWA World Heavyweight Championship. He dropped the belt back to former champion Harley Race four days later in Gainesville. Race stated in a shoot interview with RF Video that the title switch was to ensure a power struggle in the Georgia territory, which ended with promoter Jim Barnett victorious (Barnett was a minority holder in Georgia and the booker of the NWA title, with the fan interest and boosted live gates, shored up his position).

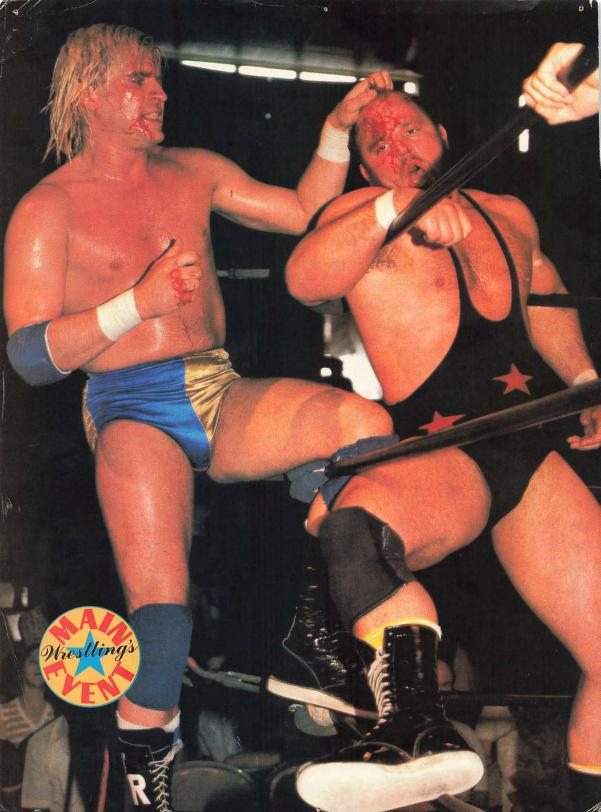
Rich (left) during a match with Buzz Sawyer (right) in early 1983

He had a feud in Georgia Championship Wrestling with "Mad Dog" Buzz Sawyer for the NWA Georgia National Title. The feud lasted close to two years, culminating in the "Last Battle of Atlanta," in 1983, which featured Sawyer and Rich in a fully enclosed, "last man standing" cage match. For years no video of this match was known to exist; however, the full video of this match was released on WWE Network on September 5, 2016. Sawyer and Rich tried forming a team for a short period of time afterward to feud with a new team called the "Road Warriors". Rich was later directed into a feud with Ted DiBiase. They had a "loser leaves wrestling" match that Rich lost. So, Rich put on a mask & came back as Mr. R.

DiBiase insisted that Mr R. was really Rich. Then, on a TV match for DiBiase's NWA National Title, Rich visited announcer Gordon Solie during the match. DiBiase unmasked Mr R to find that it was rookie wrestler Brad Armstrong. In all of the confusion, Armstrong pinned DiBiase to become NWA National Champion.

=== Memphis and AWA (1984–1987) ===
Rich then returned to the Memphis area, where he formed a team with "Hot Stuff" Eddie Gilbert known as "Fargo's Fabulous Ones". The previous Fabulous Ones, Steve Keirn and Stan Lane, walked out on the territory. They held the AWA Southern Tag Team titles in 1984, then dropped them to Phil Hickerson and the Spoiler (Frank Morrell). Afterward, Gilbert turned heel on Rich and they had a brief, but intense feud, which began on television when the two were presented with a "Tag Team of the Year" award by announcer Lance Russell and two guests. Gilbert, unaware his former partner was at the taping, badmouthed Rich, then the International Heavyweight Champion, until Rich came out to confront him. Rich immediately got the upper hand, running Gilbert into the steel ringpost several times, bloodying him in the process before the cameras went to a commercial. After the commercial break, Gilbert told Russell he wanted Rich to come back out so he could apologize to him in person, stating he was wrong for still being bitter about the break-up of the team, and was fueled by jealousy of Rich's championship title reign and newfound star status. When Rich accepted Gilbert's apology, Gilbert suddenly turned on him and rammed Rich's head into the ringpost, just as Rich had done to him moments earlier.

After competing in Southeast Championship Wrestling, Rich would again return to the Memphis area in 1987 and contribute to one of the greatest feuds in wrestling history. Austin Idol versus Jerry Lawler went on for over a year and culminated in a hair vs. hair match at the Mid-South Coliseum. Rich hid under the ring for the entire event only to emerge during the cage match, causing Lawler to lose the match and his hair, which led to a heel turn for Rich. After Bill Dundee later joined the feud on Lawler's side, it would climax with a tag team scaffold match that saw Lawler and Dundee emerge victorious and Paul E. Dangerously, Rich and Idol's manager, suffer a broken arm when he fell off the scaffold trying to escape from the fan favorites. From there, Rich went to the AWA and turned face again, engaging in feuds with Adrian Adonis and Kevin Kelly; in one memorable event that took place on ESPN's AWA Championship Wrestling, Rich and Kelly faced off in an arm-wrestling challenge when Sherri Martel, Kelly's manager, interfered on her protégé's behalf, leading Rich to retaliate by tearing off Martel's dress and leaving her in her underwear.

=== World Championship Wrestling (1989–1992) ===
In 1989, Rich returned to the Georgia area. World Championship Wrestling, having been bought by Ted Turner in late 1988, was in the middle of a face lift and Rich was part of a host of veteran wrestlers to enter the promotion during this period. Eddie Gilbert introduced him on the June 24, 1989, episode of World Championship Wrestling, and Rich announced that he would be challenging US Heavyweight Champion Lex Luger. The following weekend Rich defeated Wild Bill Irwin in his first match back with the promotion.

At first he was referred to as "former NWA World Champion", and was undefeated. On the July 22, 1989, edition of World Championship Wrestling he teamed with Davey Rich and Johnny Rich to defeat George South, Lee Scott, and Trent Knight. The following Friday, he wrestled friend Eddie Gilbert to a draw on The Main Event. However, only a month into his tenure, Rich found himself relegated to midcard status. The push received by big names like Ricky Steamboat and Terry Funk and newly arrived younger talent like Brian Pillman and The Great Muta, essentially bumped older performers like Rich, The Iron Sheik and Wild Bill Irwin to the fringe. His first defeat came when he teamed again with Johnny & Davey Rich and lost to Norman and The Skyscrapers on the July 29th edition of World Championship Wrestling.

As the summer progressed Rich fulfilled his on-air pledge and mounted a challenge to NWA US Champion Lex Luger in a series of title matches at various house shows. These attempts were unsuccessful, and Rich then moved on to a house show series in the fall of 1989 with Norman. Rich came out again on the losing side of the matches and slid further down the card. Rich made his first Clash of Champions appearance that fall, teaming with Eddie Gilbert in a loss to Doom (Ron Simmons and Butch Reed) on Clash of Champions IX in Troy, NY on November 15, 1989. This led to Rich and Gilbert teaming regularly entering the winter, as they faced The Samoan Swat Team on the house show loop. On November 28, 1989, he lost to Mike Rotundo in television, then challenged him to a rematch the following weekend that ended in a no contest. As the year ended Rich formed a new team with Ranger Ross and began a new series with The New Zealand Militia.

Tommy Rich began 1990 with a televised win over Cactus Jack on the January 6th episode of World Championship Wrestling. He then resumed teaming with Eddie Gilbert to face the New Zealand Militia, but were unsuccessful. On March 9, 1990, he faced NWA World Champion Ric Flair in a non-title match on The Power Hour but was pinned. Meanwhile, he continued to team with Gilbert, losing to Doom on the March 24th episode of NWA Pro. Rich also began teaming with Johnny Ace, who himself had just lost in partner. The duo faced The New Samoans at house shows in early spring and were successful in initial encounters. On April 6 on the Power Hour he faced the newly arrived "Outlaw" Joel Deaton and was upset after being struck with an illegal object. He gained a measure of revenge on the April 14th episode of World Championship Wrestling when he pinned Deaton in a rematch. Rich defeated him again on May 5 on World Championship Wrestling.

On May 20, 1990, on the Main Event he faced Cactus Jack once more, again defeating the protege of Kevin Sullivan. On the same show Dutch Mantell disparaged him; Rich then began a house show series against Mantell where he was undefeated. At the Capital Combat 90 on May 19 in Washington, D.C., he teamed with Mike Rotundo in a loss to the Samoan Swat Team. The summer Rich began to have a resurgence, having gotten into better shape he went on a winning streak, defeating Joe Cruz, The Samoan Savage, The Super Destroyer (Mike Thor), and Jumbo Maretto. At Clash of the Champions XI on June 13 he defeated Bam Bam Bigelow via disqualification. He continued to beat Bigelow in rematches at house shows, always by disqualification, and then finally lost to the returning Barry Windham at a house show in Birmingham, AL on June 20.

On television Rich continued to remain undefeated. He began teaming with Tim Horner, winning matches against The State Patrol and Barry Horowitz & JD Wolf. On the July 14th edition of World Championship Wrestling he defeated Stan Hansen via disqualification after being thrown over the top rope. After another series of wins against Mantell on the house show circuit he had the biggest test in his comeback, a match at Great American Bash 90 PPV against former foe Harley Race, who had begun his own comeback. Race would win the match in what announcer Jim Ross considered an upset. He then rebounded to pin "Nature Boy" Buddy Landell on The Main Event on July 29, 1990. On the August 10, 1990, episode of WCW Power Hour Rich defeated "Mean" Marc Callous (the soon to be Undertaker) via disqualification. He then began a house show feud with Buddy Landell and was victorious, before pivoting to a less successful series against Stan Hansen.

Rich gained a measure of revenge against Harley Race as the fall of 1990 began, defeating the older wrestler in several house show encounters. He also beat The Blade Hunter (Al Green) in numerous house show matches, as well as continuing to dominate Buddy Landell. On the October 20, 1990, episode of WCW Worldwide he teamed with the newly returned Terry Taylor, but the duo was defeated by The Nasty Boys. The same day that Rich teamed with Taylor on Worldwide he also formed a makeshift partnership with Ricky Morton, whose regular partner Robert Gibson was out of action with injury. Again The Nasty Boys were the opponents, and Morton and Rich were defeated. The following weekend the new team rebounded to defeat The Italian Stallion & Joe Cazana. On October 27, 1990, Rich and Morton defeated The Midnight Express at Halloween Havoc 90 in Chicago, IL in what would be the final WCW match for the latter team.

On November 17, 1990, Rich and Morton defeated The Freebirds on WCW Main Event. The duo remained undefeated on television, occasionally teaming with El Gigante in various matches. At Starrcade 90 Rich and Morton again defeated the Freebirds, and Tommy Rich ended 1990 in a much stronger position than he had been a year earlier.

Entering 1991, Rich and Morton began teaming with The Junkyard Dog in six man matches. On the February 9, 1991, edition of WCW Worldwide the trio defeated The State Patrol and The Master Blasters (Kevin Nash & Al Greene) Following a loss to Arn Anderson and Barry Windham on WCW Pro on January 26, 1991, Rich and Morton rebounded to defeat the Horsemen a week later via countout. On February 17, 1991, Tommy Rich, Ricky Morton, and Junkyard Dog defeated Mr X (Randy Colley), Dutch Mantell, and Buddy Landell to win the newly formed WCW World Six-Man Tag Team Championship. On the Feb 23, 1991, edition of World Championship Wrestling they teamed to beat Magnum Force and Bill Ford. On March 3, 1991, on The Main Event the trio defeated Terry Taylor, Bobby Eaton, and Buddy Landell.

As the trio continued to team together Rich also continued his duo partnership with Morton, facing The Freebirds on the house show loop. He also separately teamed with Junkyard Dog in matches against Dr. X and Moondog Rex, as well as The Royal Family (New Zealand Militia). At the inaugural SuperBrawl PPV at St. Petersburg, FL on May 19, 1991, Rich took on the returning Nikita Koloff and was defeated.

On June 3, 1991, in Birmingham, Alabama the trio of Rich, Morton, and Junkyard Dog finally lost their World Six Man Championship to The Freebirds (Michael Hayes, Jimmy Garvin, and Badstreet (Brad Armstrong), in a match airing on WCW Main Event. This presaged another slide down the card, as Rich found himself on the losing end of encounters with Nikita Koloff, Oz (Kevin Nash), and Steve Austin. At Clash of Champions XV in Knoxville, TN on June 12, 1991, he was defeated by another newcomer in The Diamond Studd (Scott Hall). In addition, his partnership with Ricky Morton came to a temporary end. As the summer of 1991 began Robert Gibson returned from injury and attempted to reform the Rock 'n' Roll Express with Rich's partner Ricky Morton; Morton turned heel and left Tommy without a partner. Rich would face Morton at a house show in Greensville, SC on July 13 and be defeated.

On the July 27, 1991, edition of World Championship Wrestling Rich teamed once more with Junkyard Dog and defeated Chuck Coates and Bob Cook. Morton, who had been renamed "Richard Morton" after he had joined Alexandra York's York Foundation heel stable came out and talked to Rich midway through the bout. On the August 18, 1991, edition of WCW he turned heel himself, joining the York Foundation and becoming known as "Thomas Rich". In competed in singles as well as with the other members of the stable, Morton and Terrence Taylor.

The heel turn did not reverse his fortunes as he found himself falling in defeat to Johnny B. Badd, Big Josh, PN News, Brian Pillman, and Ron Simmons. He competed in a 15-man battle royal at the Clash of the Champions XVI, which was ultimately won by El Gigante. On the September 22, 1991, edition of The Main Event the York Foundation trio challenged current WCW Six-Man Tag-Team Champions Dustin Rhodes, Tom Zenk, and Big Josh but were unsuccessful.

Rich finally ended his losing streak on October 5 on World Championship Wrestling, pinning Brian Pillman after striking him with Alexandra York's computer. During the match, Josh complained that Rich used to be a friend that stopped communicating with him. The following week Pillman gained a measure of revenge when he teamed with Big Josh to defeat Rich and Terrance Taylor. On October 19 on WCW Worldwide he was pinned in a singles match with Big Josh. The York Foundation challenged Rhodes, Zenk, and Big Josh once more on the November 3rd edition of The Main Event and lost once more; on November 10, 1991, however they finally broke through on the next expisode. That night they defeated Rhodes, Zenk, and Josh to win the Six Man Championship. This would be Rich's second run with the title in less than a year.

Dustin Rhodes, Tom Zenk, and Big Josh challenged The York Foundation to a rematch and defeated them in a non-title matchup on the November 16, 1991, edition of WCW Pro. On the December 8th edition of The Main Event the York Foundation lost again the former champions in a steel cage match; however once more this was a non-title match. At Starrcade 91 Rich was one of the participants in The Lethal Lottery, a drawing that partnered wrestlers randomly in tag-team matches. Rich found himself teaming with Ron Simmons to defeat PN News and Steve Armstrong. At the Battlebowl phase of the event he was eliminated by Marcus Alexander Bagwell.

The WCW Six-Man Championship was deactivated in December 1991 as The York Foundation began to crumble. Terrance Taylor was the first to leave the group, and Tommy Rich opened 1992 teaming with Richard Morton in a losing effort against Taylor and Big Josh in Atlanta, GA at The Omni. He wrestled at Clash of Champions XVIII, facing Vinnie Vegas (Kevin Nash) and losing in the latter's debut. He began teaming with Tracy Armstrong after the former Young Pistols' teammate Steve Armstrong left WCW; the duo would engage in an unsuccessful house show series against The Patriots in the spring of 1992. Rich teamed with Dallas Page to defeat Bob Cook and Firebreaker Chip in the dark match of WrestleWar 92 in Jacksonville, FL on May 17, 1992; after this Rich departed from the promotion.

=== USWA, AWF and SMW (1992–1997) ===
Rich reverted to being Tommy Rich and from 1992 to 1997, he wrestled for the United States Wrestling Association (USWA), American Wrestling Federation (AWF) and Smoky Mountain Wrestling (SMW) mostly as a heel. Some of his notable tag team partners in the USWA were Doug Gilbert and Gorgeous George III. In 1995, he attempted to regain the NWA World title, from Dan Severn, but was unsuccessful. In SMW, he was a part of Jim Cornette's militia, where he was the top lieutenant. After SMW shut down in December 1995, he returned to the USWA. USWA shut down in November 1997.

=== Extreme Championship Wrestling (1997–1999) ===
Rich debuted in the Philadelphia, Pennsylvania-based promotion Extreme Championship Wrestling (ECW) in January 1997. Later that year, he became the leader of The Full Blooded Italians, adopting the nickname "The Big Don" and the tongue-in-cheek gimmick of a caporegime. Rich both managed The Full Blooded Italians and occasionally wrestled. He left ECW in 1999.

=== Independent circuit (1999–present) ===
Since leaving ECW in 1999, Rich has worked on countless independent promotions as well as legends events and reunion events. In addition to wrestling on the events, he has appeared at autograph signings and legends conventions.

On July 2, 2011, Rich was involved in a backstage altercation with independent wrestler J.P. Magnum at a TCW live event in Graysville, TN. Rich was allegedly upset that he was booked to lose an "I Quit" match to a manager, TCW Rhea County Heritage Champion Jay West. Rich ended up losing the match to West, before defeating Keith Hart later in the card.

On November 6, 2015, in Hanover, Indiana, Rich teamed with "The Rebel" Tom Scroggins to face the team of Big N' Tasty on NWA-Supreme's Event Three Generations of Excellence featuring another NWA former World Champion, Rob Conway, and Johnny Justice.

On December 15, 2015, Rich teamed with Bobby Fulton, Rob Kincaid, and Dallas Davison to face and beat Robert Applewhite, Steven Jones, Wade Castle and Vladimir Alexander at Rose City Championship Wrestling in Richmond, Indiana.

== Personal life ==
Richardson is married to Terri, with whom he has three daughters and six grandchildren.

== Championship and accomplishments ==
- Wildfire Championship Wrestling
  - Wildfire Tag Team Championship (1 time, current) – with Richie Rich
- All-Star Championship Wrestling
  - ACW Southern Heavyweight Championship (1 time)
- American Wrestling Federation
  - AWF Tag Team Championship (1 time) – with Greg Valentine
- Cajun Wrestling Federation
  - CWF Heavyweight Championship (1 time)
- Cleveland All-Pro Wrestling
  - CAPW North American Tag Team Championship (1 time) – with K.C. Blood
- Cauliflower Alley Club
  - Men's Wrestling Award (2020)
- Deep South Wrestling
  - Deep South Heavyweight Championship (2 times)
- Game Changer Wrestling
  - WOMBAT Tag Team Championship (1 time) – with Mike Jackson
- Georgia Championship Wrestling
  - NWA Georgia Heavyweight Championship (3 times)
  - NWA Georgia Tag Team Championship (7 times) – with Tony Atlas (1), Rick Martel (1), Stan Hansen (2), Thunderbolt Patterson (1), Wahoo McDaniel (1), and The Crusher (1)
  - NWA Georgia Television Championship (1 time)
  - NWA Macon Heavyweight Championship (1 time)
  - NWA National Heavyweight Championship (3 times)
  - NWA World Heavyweight Championship (1 time)
- International Wrestling Alliance
  - IWA Southern Heavyweight Championship (1 time)
- International Professional Wrestling Hall of Fame
  - Class of 2026
- Memphis Wrestling Hall of Fame
  - Class of 2021
- National Wrestling Alliance
  - NWA Hall of Fame (2008)
- National Wrestling Conference
  - NWC Heavyweight Championship (1 time)
- Northern States Wrestling Alliance
  - NSWA Hardcore Championship (1 time)
- NWA Mid-America / Continental Wrestling Association
  - AWA Southern Heavyweight Championship (2 times)
  - AWA Southern Tag Team Championship (4 times) – with Bill Dundee (2), Eddie Gilbert (1), and Dutch Mantel (1)
  - CWA International Heavyweight Championship (1 time)
  - CWA World Tag Team Championship (2 times) – with Bill Dundee (1) and Jerry "The King" Lawler (1)
  - NWA Mid-America Heavyweight Championship (2 times)
  - NWA Six-Man Tag Team Championship (2 times) – with Tojo Yamamoto and George Gulas
  - NWA Southern Heavyweight Championship (Memphis version) (2 times)
  - NWA United States Tag Team Championship (Mid-America version) (1 time) – with Tojo Yamamoto
- Ohio Professional Wrestling Hall of Fame
  - Ohio Professional Wrestling Hall of Fame (Class of 2020)
- Premiere Wrestling Federation
  - PWF Universal Heavyweight Championship (1 time)
- Pro Wrestling Illustrated
  - PWI Most Improved Wrestler of the Year (1979)
  - PWI Most Popular Wrestler of the Year (1981)
  - PWI Rookie of the Year (1978)
  - PWI ranked him #117 of the top 500 singles wrestlers of the "PWI Years" in 2003
- Professional Wrestling Hall of Fame and Museum
  - Class of 2021
- Smoky Mountain Wrestling
  - SMW Heavyweight Championship (1 time)
- Southeastern Championship Wrestling
  - NWA Southeast Continental Heavyweight Championship (1 time)
  - NWA Southeastern Tag Team Championship (Northern Division) (3 times) – with Bill Dundee (1), Johnny Rich (1), and Steve Armstrong (1)
- Southern Championship Wrestling (Jerry Blackwell)
  - SCW Heavyweight Championship (1 time)
  - SCW Tag Team Championship (3 times, first) – with Ted Oates, Steve Pritchard and Joey Maggs
- Tennessee All-Star Wrestling
  - TASW Heavyweight Championship (1 time)
- Tennessee Championship Wrestling
  - TCW Heavyweight Championship (1 time)
- United States Wrestling Association
  - USWA Heavyweight Championship (4 times)
  - USWA World Tag Team Championship (4 times) – with Doug Gilbert
  - USWA Heavyweight Title Tournament (1994)
- World Championship Wrestling
  - WCW World Six-Man Tag Team Championship (2 times) – with Ricky Morton & The Junkyard Dog (1) and Richard Morton and Terrence Taylor (1)
- World Wrestling Empire
  - WWE North American Championship (1 time)
- Wrestling Observer Newsletter Awards
  - Feud of the Year (1987) with Austin Idol vs. Jerry Lawler
  - Best Babyface (1981)
- Xtreme Intense Championship Wrestling
  - XICW Heavyweight Championship (1 time)
- World Class Professional Big Time Wrestling
  - WCPBTW Ohio State Tag Team Championship (1 time) – with Ricky Morton
