= AWF Hardcore Championship =

Professional wrestling championship

Details
- Promotion: Africa Wrestling Alliance
- Date established: 11 December 2004
- Date retired: 25 February 2005
Statistics
- First champion(s): Skull
- Final champion(s): Skull (won 11 December 2004)
- Most reigns: Skull (1)
- Longest reign: Skull
- Oldest champion: Skull
- Youngest champion: Skull
- Heaviest champion: Skull
- Lightest champion: Skull

The AWF Hardcore Championship is a professional wrestling championship currently inactive in the South African professional wrestling promotion Africa Wrestling Alliance, contested under hardcore rules. It was created on 11 December 2004 on the AWA's final two-hour live television special, AWF on E Slam Series Final, when Skull defeated Jacques Rogue. The title was retired in early 2005 when AWA failed to secure another year of television with e.tv and returned to its roots as a regionally based promotion.

== Title history ==
Key
No.	Overall reign number
Reign	Reign number for the specific champion
Days	Number of days held

No.	Champion	Championship change			Reign statistics		Notes	Ref.
No.	Champion	Date	Event	Location	Reign	Days	Notes	Ref.
1	Skull	11 December 2004	AWA show	Johannesburg, South Africa	1	76		
