= Johnny Palazzio =

Personal information
- Born: 6 March 1980 (age 46) Cape Town, South Africa

Professional wrestling career
- Ring name(s): JP; Johnny Palazzio
- Billed height: 5 ft 11 in (180 cm)
- Billed weight: 223 lb (101 kg)
- Billed from: South Africa
- Trained by: Shaun Koen
- Debut: 21 February 2002

Jean Paul Whittacker, better known by his ring name Johnny Palazzio, (born 6 March 1980) is a South African professional wrestler currently performing for Africa Wrestling Alliance. He is the current 2-time African Cruiserweight Champion and previously held the title for 4 years until he lost the title to William McQueen on 2 December 2008.

== Career ==
After training at the AWA Wrestling Academy, Johnny Palazzio made his professional wrestling debut for the Africa Wrestling Alliance in 2002 as JP, teaming up with Viper and The Clown to take on Ultimo Wulf, Nitro and William McQueen in a losing effort. He became embroiled in a heated feud with Nitro for the rest of 2002 and 2003, then made his debut at the Parow Civic Centre, the AWA's most widely used venue, teaming up with Viper and losing to Nitro and Ultimo Wulf.

In 2004, he dominated the cruiserweight division for most of the year. Palazzio teamed up with his trainee Tygra to defeat Wolf and Saphire in South African wrestling's first-ever mixed gender tag team match. Later in the year, he feuded with nemesis Archangel. On 11 December 2004, at the AWF on E Slam Series Final broadcast live on eTV, he defeated Archangel in a 12-man cruiserweight battle royal to become the first-ever AWA African Cruiserweight Champion.

In 2005, he feuded with the larger African Warrior in a bid to prove he could defeat anyone. They had a 5-match series, which took place in various parts of South Africa and Swaziland. Both wrestlers won 2 matches, and the final match ended in a time-limit draw.

He defended the AWA African Cruiserweight Championship in South Africa's first-ever ladder match on 16 June 2007 at the Parow Civic Centre, defeating William McQueen and Vinnie Vegas.

On 2 December 2008 at AWA Coca-Cola Royal Rumble: Last Man Standing in a Four-Way Elimination match also involving William McQueen, Vinnie Vegas and Warlock, his four-year reign as the AWA African Cruiserweight Champion ended when he was pinned by William McQueen.

On 7 April 2009 he became a 2-time champion when he won the title back from McQueen.

In 2004 he made a guest appearance on the South African sitcom Madam & Eve.

== Championships and accomplishments ==
- Africa Wrestling Alliance

- AWA African Heavyweight Championship (1 time)
- AWA African Cruiserweight Championship (2 times)

- Pro Wrestling Illustrated

- PWI ranked him #453 of the 500 best singles wrestlers in 2007.
