= AWA Lightweight Championship =

Professional wrestling championship

Details
- Promotion: Africa Wrestling Alliance
- Date established: April 7, 2009
- Current champion: Revyv
- Date won: December 9, 2009
Statistics
- First champion: Nick Fury
- Most reigns: 1
- Longest reign: Revyv

The AWA Lightweight Championship is a professional wrestling championship in the South African professional wrestling promotion Africa Wrestling Alliance, contested exclusively among lightweight (85 kg (187 lb)) wrestlers. It was created on April 7, 2009, and was first contested on the AWA House of Pain: Night of the Champions supercard, where Nick Fury won it in a six-man battle royale

== Title history ==
Key
No.	Overall reign number
Reign	Reign number for the specific champion
Days	Number of days held

No.	Champion	Championship change			Reign statistics		Notes	Ref.
No.	Champion	Date	Event	Location	Reign	Days	Notes	Ref.
1	Nick Fury	April 7, 2009	AWA House of Pain: Night of the Champions	Parow, Cape Town, South Africa	1	246	Won in 6-Man Battle Royale Match	
2	Revyv	December 9, 2009	AWA show	Parow, Cape Town, South Africa	1	5951+	Won in a three-way dance against Nick Fury and El Matador.	

== See also ==
- Africa Wrestling Alliance
