= WCW World Six-Man Tag Team Championship =

Former professional wrestling title

- The championship belt

Details
- Promotion: National Wrestling Alliance; World Championship Wrestling
- Date established: February 17, 1991
- Date retired: December 4, 1991

Other name
- NWA World Six-Man Tag Team Championship
Statistics
- First champions: Junkyard Dog, Ricky Morton and Tommy Rich
- Final champions: The York Foundation (Ricky Morton, Tommy Rich and Terrance Taylor)
- Most reigns: (as team) all (1) (as individual) Ricky Morton and Tommy Rich (2)
- Longest reign: Junkyard Dog, Ricky Morton and Tommy Rich (106 days)
- Shortest reign: The York Foundation (Ricky Morton, Tommy Rich and Terrance Taylor) (57 days)

The WCW World Six-Man Tag Team Championship was a championship contested in World Championship Wrestling throughout 1991. It was considered a revived version of the NWA World Six-Man Tag Team Championship that was used in Jim Crockett Promotions; however, unlike the former version, which was often held by main eventers in between singles title feuds, this title was mostly used to push midcarders. The only men to win the title twice are Ricky Morton and Tommy Rich. It was abandoned in November 1991.

Months later, on the May 23 and 30 editions of WCW Magazine during WCW Worldwide, announcer Eric Bischoff mentioned that the Six-Man Tag Team Titles would be on the line at Beach Blast 1992, when Dangerous Alliance members Bobby Eaton, Arn Anderson and Steve Austin faced WCW loyalists Barry Windham, Dustin Rhodes and Nikita Koloff. The idea to bring back the titles was apparently changed, as the match ended up a standard six-man tag match.

== Reigns ==
Key
No.	Overall reign number
Reign	Reign number for the specific team—reign numbers for the individuals are in parentheses, if different
Days	Number of days held

No.	Champion	Championship change			Reign statistics		Notes	Ref.
No.	Champion	Date	Event	Location	Reign	Days	Notes	Ref.
1	Junkyard Dog, Ricky Morton and Tommy Rich	February 17, 1991	House show	Atlanta, GA	1	106	Defeated Buddy Landel, Dutch Mantel and Dr. X at a house show.	
2	The Fabulous Freebirds (Badstreet, Jimmy Garvin and Michael Hayes)	June 3, 1991	Main Event	Birmingham, AL	1	63	Aired June 30, 1991 on tape delay.	
3	Big Josh, Dustin Rhodes and Tom Zenk	August 5, 1991	Worldwide	St. Joseph, MO	1	64	Aired August 24, 1991 on tape delay.	
4	The York Foundation (Richard Morton (2), Thomas Rich (2) and Terrance Taylor)	October 8, 1991	Main Event	Montgomery, AL	1	57	Aired November 10, 1991 on tape delay.	
—	Deactivated	December 4, 1991	—	—	—	—		

== Combined reigns ==
=== By wrestler ===
¤	The exact length of a title reign is uncertain; the combined length may not be correct.

Rank	Wrestler	No. of reigns	Combined days
1	Richard Morton/Ricky Morton	2	160¤
1	Thomas Rich/Tommy Rich	2	160¤
3	Junkyard Dog	1	106
4	Big Josh	1	64
4	Dustin Rhodes	1	64
4	Tom Zenk	1	64
7	Badstreet	1	63
7	Jimmy Garvin	1	63
7	Michael Hayes	1	63
10	Terrance Taylor	1	61¤
