= AWA Royal Rumble Championship =

Professional wrestling battle royal and championship

Details
- Promotion: Africa Wrestling Alliance
- Date established: December, 1995
- Current champion: Vinnie Vegas
- Date won: 9 December 2009
Statistics
- First champion: Shaun Koen

The AWA Royal Rumble Championship is a professional wrestling championship in the South African professional wrestling promotion Africa Wrestling Alliance, contested in an over-the-top-rope battle royal style match held every December at AWA's Coca-Cola Royal Rumble show, usually involving up to 21 participants. It was founded in December, 1995 during the AWA's first year in existence when they were still known as the Africa Wrestling Federation. The current champion is Vinnie Vegas, who won the title on 9 December 2000.

== Title history ==
Key
No.	Overall reign number
Reign	Reign number for the specific champion
Days	Number of days held

No.	Champion	Championship change			Reign statistics		Notes	Ref.
No.	Champion	Date	Event	Location	Reign	Days	Notes	Ref.
1	Shaun Koen	December 1995	AWA show	Cape Town, South Africa	1			
2	Shaun Koen	6 December 1996	AWA show	Cape Town, South Africa	2			
3	Big Bad Bruce	4 December 1997	AWA show	Cape Town, South Africa	1			
4	Sunny Surf	1 December 1998	AWA show	Cape Town, South Africa	1			
5	Bulldog	4 December 1999	AWA show	Cape Town, South Africa	1			
6	Lightning Shaun	3 December 2000	AWA show	Cape Town, South Africa	1			
7	The Missing Link	3 December 2005	AWA show	Cape Town, South Africa	1			
8	African Warrior	6 December 2006	AWA show	Cape Town, South Africa	1			
9	William McQueen	3 December 2007	AWA show	Cape Town, South Africa	1			
10	The Oz	2 December 2008	AWA show	Cape Town, South Africa	1			
11	Vinnie Vegas	9 December 2009	AWA show	Cape Town, South Africa	1			

== See also ==
- Africa Wrestling Alliance
