= AWF Tag Team Championship =

Professional wrestling tag team championship

Details
- Promotion: Africa Wrestling Alliance
- Date established: 11 December 2004
- Date retired: 25 February 2005
Statistics
- First champions: The Saint and The Gladiator
- Final champions: The Saint and The Gladiator (won 11 December 2004)

The AWF Tag Team Championship is a professional wrestling championship currently inactive in the South African professional wrestling promotion Africa Wrestling Alliance, contested among tag teams. It was created on 11 December 2004. The Saint and The Gladiator (Dirk Jansen van Vuuren) were the first and last champions, having defeated The Missing Link and Trashman to win the belts on the 2-hour live special, AWF on E Slam Series Final. The titles were soon retired in early 2005 after AWA failed to secure another year of television with eTV.

== Title history ==
Key
No.	Overall reign number
Reign	Reign number for the specific champion
Days	Number of days held

No.	Champion	Championship change			Reign statistics		Notes	Ref.
No.	Champion	Date	Event	Location	Reign	Days	Notes	Ref.
1	The Saint and The Gladiator	11 December 2004	AWA show	North West, South Africa	1	76	Won in 6-Man Battle Royale Match	

== See also ==
- Africa Wrestling Alliance
