= AWA African Heavyweight Championship =

Professional wrestling championship

Details
- Promotion: Africa Wrestling Alliance (AWA)
- Date established: January 1990
- Current champion(s): Johnny Palazzio
- Date won: 5 April 2011
Statistics
- First champion(s): Big Mike Zuma
- Most reigns: Shaun Koen (3 reigns)

The AWA African Heavyweight Championship is a professional wrestling heavyweight championship owned by the Africa Wrestling Alliance (AWA) promotion. It was created in January 1990.

== Title history ==
Key
No.	Overall reign number
Reign	Reign number for the specific team—reign numbers for the individuals are in parentheses, if different
Days	Number of days held

No.	Champion	Championship change			Reign statistics		Notes	Ref.
No.	Champion	Date	Event	Location	Reign	Days	Notes	Ref.
1	Big Mike Zuma	January 1990	AWA show	Cape Town, South Africa	1	734		
2	Shaun Koen	January 1992	AWA show	Johannesburg, South Africa	1	1461		
3	King Jacob	January 1996	AWA show	Nairobi, Kenya	1	31		
4	Shaun Koen	February 1996	AWA show	Nairobi, Kenya	2	3043		
5	Terry Middoux	June 2004	AWA show	Cape Town, South Africa	1	183		
6	Shaun Koen	11 December 2004	AWA show	North West, South Africa	3	193		
7	The Missing Link	30 April 2008	AWA show	Cape Town, South Africa	1	2306		
8	Johnny Palazzio	5 April 2011	AWA show	N/A	1	5,097+		
