= York Foundation =

Professional wrestling stable

Stable
- Members: Alexandra York; Michael Wallstreet; Terrance Taylor; Richard Morton; Thomas Rich; Mr. Hughes
- Debut: 1990
- Disbanded: 1992

The York Foundation was a professional wrestling stable in World Championship Wrestling between 1990 and 1992. It was led by tech-savvy businesswoman Alexandra York, and comprised former babyfaces who adopted formal wear and formalized their ring names upon joining.

== History ==
Ms. Alexandra York entered WCW near the end of 1990 as the manager and financial analyst of Mike Rotunda. According to the storyline Rotunda had inherited a lot of money, turned heel and then adopted the name “Michael Wallstreet” (a gimmick patterned after Gordon Gekko from the film Wall Street). Ms. York would use her laptop to analyze Wallstreet's opponents and help him win matches. Wallstreet started off strong by defeating The Starblazer at Clash of the Champions XIII before engaging in a feud with Terry Taylor. Ms. York claimed that her computer program predicted that Wallstreet could beat Taylor in less than nine minutes, so during their Starrcade 1990 match a nine-minute countdown clock was used. Wallstreet won the match within the time limit. In early 1991, Rotunda left WCW and signed with the World Wrestling Federation where he became a “ruthless tax collector” known as Irwin R. Schyster.

With no one to manage, Ms. York started to scout WCW, looking for her next “project”. At Clash of the Champions XIV Ms. York found her man. During a match between Terry Taylor and Ricky Morton Ms. York appeared at ringside, distracted Morton and allowed Taylor to win the match. Taylor's turn did not come as any surprise as he was mistakenly introduced as “the Computerized Man of the 90s” before the match. Taylor joined the York Foundation and insisted on being known as Terrence Taylor from now on and started wearing a business suit. Miss York also added Mr. Hughes as a bodyguard.

Next, Ms. York set her sights on Dustin Rhodes (later her real-life husband) wanting him to join her foundation. When Dustin Rhodes turned her down, Taylor attacked him, kicking off a long-running feud between Rhodes and the York Foundation. In April and May, she had Taylor team with Arn Anderson and Larry Zbyszko as potential recruits, but they decided to form a tag team called the Enforcers instead of joining the York Foundation. She also gave "Nature Boy" Buddy Landel a few tryouts but did not sign him as he lost these matches.

At Clash of the Champions XV on June 12, 1991, the York Foundation Ricky Morton - now renamed Richard Morton - joined in an attack on Dustin Rhodes and also beat up his longtime Rock 'n' Roll Express partner Robert Gibson just as he announced he was ready to return from a serious knee injury. In July, Richard Morton defeated Gibson at the Great American Bash 1991. Gibson left WCW shortly after allowing Morton to focus on the York Foundation's feud with Dustin Rhodes & friends. At the Great American Bash, the Foundation lost the services of Mr. Hughes as he joined forces with Harley Race and Lex Luger, instead Ms. York brought in Thomas Rich to be the third member of her foundation.

Over the summer, the Foundation continued its feud with Dustin Rhodes, Tom Zenk and Bobby Eaton all of whom had turned down Ms. York's offer of membership. The Foundation beat Dustin Rhodes, Tom Zenk and Big Josh for the WCW World Six-Man Tag Team Titles on October 8, 1991 and held the titles until they were abandoned in late November 1991. As fall turned to winter, the members of the York Foundation were used more as “Enhancement Talent” to make wrestlers such as Van Hammer or Big Josh. The sole highlight was Richard Morton's participation in the tournament to crown the first ever WCW Light Heavyweight Championship where he reached the finals before losing to Flyin’ Brian. The York Foundation's final feud was with The Fabulous Freebirds and was cut short when it disbanded in January 1992.

== Championships and accomplishments ==
- World Championship Wrestling

- WCW World Six-Man Tag Team Championship (1 time) – Terrance Taylor, Richard Morton and Thomas Rich

== See also ==
- The First Family
- Money Inc.
- The U.S. Express
- The Varsity Club
