= Africa Wrestling Alliance =

South African professional wrestling promotion

- Acronym: AWA
- Founded: 1995
- Style: Traditional/Rofstoei
- Headquarters: Cape Town, South Africa
- Founder: Shaun Koen
- Owner: Shaun Koen
- Formerly: Africa Wrestling Federation
- Website: AWA Official Website

Africa Wrestling Alliance (AWA), formerly known as Africa Wrestling Federation, is a South African professional wrestling promotion founded in 1995. The regionally based company is owned by Shaun Koen and Koos Rossouw. It is a traditionally styled promotion influenced by the international wrestling market, such as European and American mainstream wrestling. The style encompassed by the promotion's wrestlers is referred to as Rofstoei (an Afrikaans term).

== History ==
The Africa Wrestling Federation (AWF) was founded by Shaun Koen and his wife in 1995 after the death of his father, Jackie Koen, on 16 December 1994. The AWF started off as a regional promotion based in Cape Town, regularly running in the Goodwood and Parow areas. A few years later the AWF started doing tours nationally and also ventured outside of South Africa to tour countries like Swaziland and Zimbabwe.

In 2003 AWF signed a year-long television contract with eTV to air weekly shows in 2004. The series was known as AWF on E Slam Series, and the episodes were recorded in arenas such as the Good Hope Centre, Carnival City and the Coca-Cola Dome. The actual running time of these events lasted three to four hours, but to minimise costs, they were split into one hour for each episode. In late 2004, ratings and attendance started decreasing. A soundtrack CD, AWF on E - The Soundtrack, was released under the EMI label to promote the television show. The year-long season culminated in a two-hour live special held at Sun City on 11 December 2004.

Plans were underway to have a second season in 2005, but AWA and eTV failed to agree to new terms. This caused the promotion to lose ownership of the name Africa Wrestling Federation and forced them to create new trademarks. The Africa Wrestling Alliance (AWA) name was then established in March 2005. Due to the lack of television exposure following AWF on E, some of the top names like The Saint, Skull, Rey Bourne and Jacques Rogue departed AWA to pursue other interests.

== Coca-Cola Royal Rumble ==
The AWA holds an annual Royal Rumble show at the Parow Civic Centre venue (nicknamed The House of Pain) in December. The event is regularly sponsored by Coca-Cola. The last champion was Marco, who won the AWA Royal Rumble Championship on 2 December 2025 in the 20-man battle royal main event.

== Touring and charity work ==
Although the AWA is currently a non-televised, regional promotion, it has had a big impact on the South African wrestling industry and frequently does tours beyond its headquarters, having held events in the surrounding areas of Cape Town and in neighbouring countries such as Swaziland, Mozambique and Zimbabwe. The promotion is also actively involved in charity work. In association with its many sponsors and the Reach for a Dream foundation, unprivileged children are provided with the opportunity to attend certain shows for free and meet members of the roster.

== Training academy ==
The AWA training facility is currently based at the Parow Golf Club in Parow, Cape Town. Classes are regularly held every Tuesday and Thursday. The head of the academy is Shaun Koen & Johnny Palazzio.

== Championships ==
=== Active ===
Championship:	Champion(s):	Previous Champion(s):	Date Won:	Location:	Event:
AWA African Heavyweight Championship	Mike Xander	Johnny "The Italian Stallion" Palazzio	23 September 2025	Parow Civic Centre, Cape Town, South Africa	AWA House of Pain: Grandslam 2025
AWA African Cruiserweight Championship	Romeo "The Chosen One" Valentino	Mr Money	23 September 2025	Parow Civic Centre, Cape Town, South Africa	AWA House of Pain: Grandslam 2025
AWA Lightweight Championship	The Rebel JSK	Werner The Wulf Pretorius	23 September 2025	Parow Civic Centre, Cape Town, South Africa	AWA House of Pain: Grandslam 2025
AWA Royal Rumble Championship	Marco	Congo King	02 December 2025	Parow Civic Centre, Cape Town, South Africa	AWA House of Pain: Coca Cola Royal Rumble

=== Active ===
Championship:	Last Champion(s):	Previous Champion(s):	Date Won:	Location:	Event:
AWA Tag-Team Championship	The Takeover (Chad Le Bron & Alex Prince)	Vacant	02 December 2025	Parow, Western Cape Province, South Africa	AWA Coca Cola Royal Rumble 2025

== AWA African Cruiserweight Championship ==
AWA African Cruiserweight Championship

Details
- Promotion: Africa Wrestling Alliance
- Date established: 11 December 2004
- Current champion: Johnny Palazzio
- Date won: 7 April 2009
Statistics
- First champion: Johnny Palazzio
- Most reigns: Johnny Palazzio (2 reigns)
- Longest reign: Johnny Palazzio (1452 days)
- Shortest reign: William McQueen (126 days)

The AWA African Cruiserweight Championship is a professional wrestling cruiserweight championship owned by the AWA promotion. The title was created and debuted on 11 December 2004 at a two-hour live television special, AWF on E Slam Series Final, when Johnny Palazzio won it in a battle royal. Title reigns are determined either by professional wrestling matches between wrestlers involved in pre-existing scripted feuds and storylines, or by scripted circumstances. Wrestlers are portrayed as either villains or heroes as they follow a series of tension-building events, which culminate in a wrestling match or series of matches for the championship. Title changes happen at live events, which are usually released on DVD.

Key
No.	Overall reign number
Reign	Reign number for the specific team—reign numbers for the individuals are in parentheses, if different
Days	Number of days held

No.	Champion	Championship change			Reign statistics		Notes	Ref.
No.	Champion	Date	Event	Location	Reign	Days	Notes	Ref.
1	Johnny Palazzio	11 December 2004	AWF on E Slam Series Final	North West, South Africa	1	1452	Palazzio won a 16-Man Battle Royal to become the first champion.	
2	William McQueen	2 December 2008	Coca-Cola Royal Rumble: Last Man Standing	Parow, South Africa	1	126		
3	Johnny Palazzio	7 April 2009	AWF show	Parow, South Africa	2	6149+		

†	Indicates the current champion

Rank	Wrestler	# of reigns	Combined days
1	Johnny Palazzio†	2	7601+
2	William McQueen	1	126

== Roster ==
=== Heavyweight Division ===
- BDX-treme
- Bulldog
- Johnny Palazzio
- Just Ted
- Missing Link
- Selfstyled Sammy Swiegers
- Shaun Koen
- The Oz

=== Cruiserweight Division ===
- Romeo "The Chosen One" Valentino
- Mr Money
- Mad-jack Maverick
- Jay Cooper
- Chad Le Bron
- Alex Prince
- Wilfred Mc-Fish

=== Lightweight Division ===
- Ed-Electric
- Hillbilly Kid
- Nick Fury
- Revyv

=== Other personnel ===
- Stan Mars (Ring Announcer)
- Billy Daniels (Timekeeper)
- Robert Meyer (Referee)
- Black Mamba (Referee)
- Kenny (Referee)
- Tony "The Hammer" (Referee)
- Leon Venter (Referee)

== Alumni ==
- African Warrior
- Alkatraz
- Archangel
- Big Bad Bruce
- Billy West
- The Bruiser
- Butcher
- The Chad
- Danie Brits
- Dusty Wolfe
- Du Congo
- El Matador
- Geronimo - Majive
- The Great Raj
- Gypsey
- Iron Bone
- Jacques Roque
- Johan Voges
- Leslie van der Westhuizen
- Mr Pain
- Nizaam "the champ" Hartley
- The Protector
- Rollerball Danny
- The Saint
- Skull
- Solid Gold Grant Smith
- Sunny Surf
- Sledgehammer
- Spider Nel
- Terry Middoux
- Tolla the Animal
- Tommy Rich
- Trashman
- Trevor van der Westhuizen
- The Viper
- Vamp
- Warlock
- Wurm Visagie
- X-Hale
