= Shaun Koen =

South African professional wrestler (born 1970)

Personal information
- Born: 3 December 1970 (age 55) Cape Town, South Africa

Professional wrestling career
- Ring name: Shaun Koen
- Billed height: 6 ft 6 in (1.98 m)
- Billed weight: 379 lb (172 kg)
- Billed from: Cape Town, South Africa
- Trained by: Jackie Koen
- Debut: 1987

Shaun Koen is a South African professional wrestler. He is the owner and promoter of the Africa Wrestling Alliance and is the promotion's current African Heavyweight Champion. Koen is a second-generation professional wrestler; his father Jackie Koen was also a competitive professional wrestler.

== Professional wrestling career ==
=== Early career ===
==== 1987–1989 ====
Shaun Koen was born into a family of athletes in Port Elizabeth, South Africa, the son of promoter and multi-time All-Africa Heavyweight Champion Jackie Koen. He made his debut at the age of sixteen in 1987 for his father's promotion, Ring Promotions, losing to veteran Jumbo Swart in Port Elizabeth. In his second-ever match the next night, he lost to Leon Venter at the Good Hope Centre in Cape Town. On 8 March 1989, he defeated John Powers. On 12 June 1989, he defeated Gary Albright. On 15 November 1989 in a big eight-man tag team match at the Good Hope Centre, he teamed with Danie Brits, Kalahari Boerboel and Tolla The Animal to beat the kayfabe foreign invading team of Tojo Yamamoto, Akam Singh, The Mexican Phantom and Mr India. On 29 November 1989, Koen beat Greg Bragg.

==== 1990–1994 ====
In 1990, he toured the Catch Wrestling Association in Germany and Austria. His experiences wrestling in Europe would greatly influence his style and future training methods. Upon returning to South Africa, he lost to South African Heavyweight Champion Danie Brits on 22 October 1990. On 27 February 1991, Koen defeated Oscar Strongbow. On 29 June 1991, he lost to champion Danie Brits in a match for the South African Heavyweight Title. He lost in a subsequent rematch on 10 July 1991. In 1992, he won the All-Africa Heavyweight Championship from the Zimbabwean Big Mike Zuma in Cape Town, his first major title victory. On 23 January 1992, he defeated German rival Ulf Herman at the Good Hope Centre. On 13 March 1992, Koen beat Mad Mike in Port Elizabeth. On 22 April 1992, he defeated Steve Regal. On 6 May 1992, he teamed with Danie Brits to defeat Jason The Terrible and Steve Regal. On 19 April 1993, he lost to The Barbarian at Good Hope Centre in Cape Town. On 8 September 1994, Koen teamed with Gama Singh to defeat Bad News Allen and Tim Flowers.

In 1994, Koen's father died.

=== Africa Wrestling Federation / Alliance ===
==== 1995–1999 ====
In 1995, he formed the Africa Wrestling Federation. Koen would train over thirty of Cape Town's wrestlers in the forthcoming years. The All-Africa Heavyweight Title, which had historic roots in Namibia and had been held by his father, was established as the main championship in the AWF. Upon its founding, the promotion became renowned in regions such as Pretoria and Cape Town, and remained regional until expanding several years later. On 4 February 1995 at an All Stars Wrestling event, he lost to champion Giant Warrior in an EWU Super Heavyweight Title match. On 26 April 1995, he defeated The German Avalanche at the Good Hope Centre. On 19 October 1995, he defeated Bad News Allen.

In 1996 during a tour of Kenya, Koen lost the title to King Jacob, but regained it three weeks later in a no-holds barred challenge. He defended the championship many times against Big Bad Bruce, his arch-rival in the 1990s. In 1999, he formed a dream team with Tornado II, who was on par with Koen in popularity.

==== 2000–2004 ====
In 2001, he suffered a severe arm injury that forced him out of action for almost a year. In 2004 at the height of the AWF's popularity, Shaun Koen and AWF signed their first television contract with nationally broadcast network e.TV. In June that year, Koen lost the title to Terry Middoux, who ended Koen's reign at 3042 days, the longest reign in the title's history. On 11 December 2004, he defeated Middoux on the final episode of the AWF's show AWF on E Slam Series Final to win his record-breaking third All-Africa Heavyweight Title.

==== 2005–2009 ====
In 2005, the Africa Wrestling Federation was renamed the Africa Wrestling Alliance. In December, 2006 at the Parow Civic Centre, he defended the title against rival Missing Link in a match that would be hailed as the most violent in Koen's career, winning after Missing Link was thrown through a table engulfed in fire. Koen would go on to defend the title successfully until 30 April 2008, when he was defeated by Missing Link in a four-way match also involving BDX-Treme and African Warrior. On 9 December 2009 at the Night of Champions event, Koen defeated Missing Link to win his fourth All-Africa Heavyweight Title, breaking his previous record of three reigns in the process.

==== 2010 ====
On 30 March 2010 at the USA vs. RSA show, Koen wrestled Giant Warrior to a double disqualification in his first title defense since reclaiming the All-Africa Heavyweight Title. On 9 June 2010, Koen defended his title successfully against Boerseun. Following the match, he was challenged by professional kickboxer and mixed martial arts star Jan Nortje, who promised to wager all three of his legitimate kickboxing titles against Koen's All-Africa Heavyweight Title in a future match. In August, 2010, the Sanlam-operated online brand SmartAboutWhat.co.za, which focuses on proving whether or not several popular beliefs and myths are real, held a filmed exhibition entitled Is Wrestling Real? at Shaun Koen's training centre in Pinelands, pitting one of their staff writers against Koen and concluding in the end that "wrestling is indeed real".

== Professional wrestling style and persona ==
Koen is referred by the nickname "The Lion of Africa". His finishing move is the Lion's Claw while he uses a diving leg drop and an enzuigiri.

== Championships and accomplishments ==
Koen applying the Lion's Claw on BDX-treme

- Africa Wrestling Federation / Africa Wrestling Alliance
  - AWF/A African Heavyweight Championship (4 times)
  - AWF Royal Rumble Championship (2 times)
- Pro Wrestling Illustrated
  - Ranked No. 342 of the top 500 wrestlers in the PWI 500 in 2007
