= Dustin Rhodes =

American professional wrestler (born 1969)

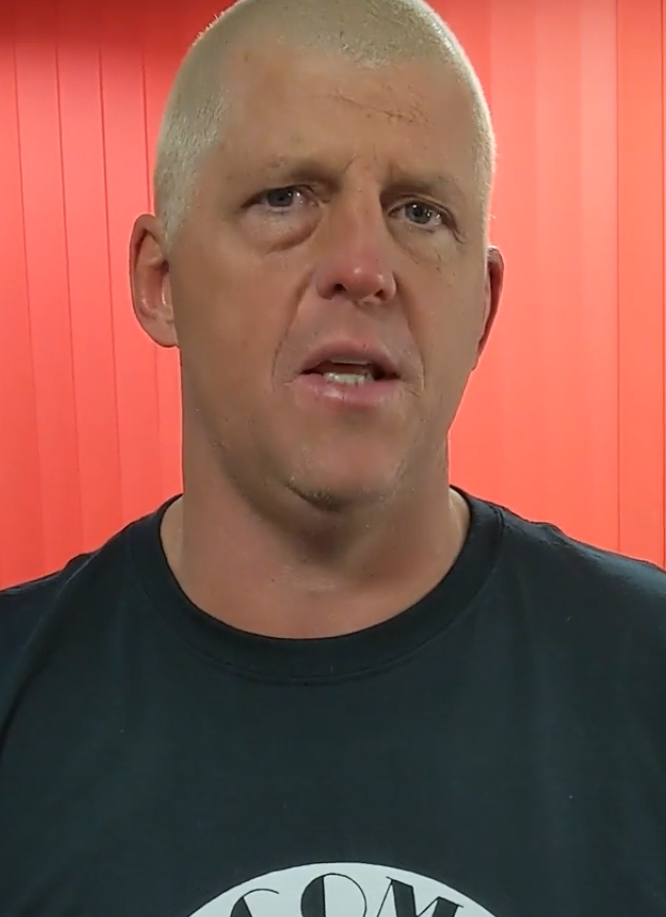
- Rhodes in 2019

Personal information
- Born: Virgil Riley Runnels III; April 11, 1969 (age 57) Dallas, Texas, U.S.
- Spouses: Terri Runnels (m. 1993; div. 1999) Milena Martelloni (m. 2002; div. 2003) Ta-rel Roche (m. 2012)
- Children: 1
- Parent(s): Dusty Rhodes (father); Sandra Runnels (mother)
- Relatives: Cody Rhodes (half-brother); Brandi Rhodes (sister-in-law)
- Website: rhodesdream.com

Professional wrestling career
- Ring name(s): The Artist formerly known as Goldust; Black Reign; Dustin; Dustin Rhodes; Dustin Runnels; Dusty Rhodes Jr. Goldust; Gold Dustin; Se7en; The Natural
- Billed height: 6 ft 6 in (198 cm)
- Billed weight: 232 lb (105 kg)
- Billed from: Austin, Texas; Hollywood, California (as Goldust)
- Trained by: Dusty Rhodes; Steve Keirn; Harley Race
- Debut: September 13, 1988

Dustin Patrick Runnels (born Virgil Riley Runnels III on April 11, 1969) is an American professional wrestler. He is signed to All Elite Wrestling (AEW), where he performs under the ring name Dustin Rhodes and is a former AEW TNT Champion. He also appears in AEW's sister promotion Ring of Honor (ROH), where he is a member of the Sons of Texas stable. In ROH, Rhodes is a former ROH World Six-Man Tag Team Champion and ROH World Tag Team Champion.

He is best known for wrestling in the World Wrestling Federation/WWE from 1995 to 2019 (on and off), under the ring name Goldust. A second generation wrestler, he is the son of WWE Hall of Famer Dusty Rhodes and the half-brother of Cody Rhodes. He is also known for his appearances with World Championship Wrestling (WCW) and Total Nonstop Action Wrestling (TNA).

Between WWE, WCW, ROH, and AEW, Runnels has won 26 championships. In WCW, he was a two-time WCW United States Heavyweight Champion, a one-time WCW World Six-Man Tag Team Champion, and a two-time WCW World Tag Team Champion. In the WWF/WWE, he was a three-time WWF Intercontinental Champion, nine-time WWE Hardcore Champion, one-time World Tag Team Champion, and two-time WWE Tag Team Champion. He won his first AEW championship, the TNT Championship, in July 2025 at All In, after having been one of the first talents since the company's inception in 2019.

Runnels has also appeared in the sixth most Royal Rumble matches, at 13. Runnels headlined multiple pay-per-view events for WWE (then WWF) and WCW during the 1990s.

== Early life ==
Runnels is the son of Virgil Runnels, better known as "The American Dream" Dusty Rhodes (1945–2015), and his first wife Sandra. His parents divorced when he was 6 years old. Growing up he spent a majority of his time in Austin, Texas with his mother and would visit his father during vacations in Florida. During his junior and senior years of high school Runnels moved in with his father in Charlotte, North Carolina. Runnels played football in high school, and wanted to compete in college however after not having the grades to do so his father then introduced him to the wrestling business.

His half-brother is fellow wrestler Cody Rhodes. He has a sister named Kristin Runnels Ditto, who is a former Dallas Cowboys Cheerleader, and a half-sister named Teil Gergel.

== Professional wrestling career ==
=== Championship Wrestling from Florida (1988) ===
Runnels made his professional wrestling debut on September 13, 1988, as "Dustin Rhodes", defeating Bob Cook in a match for the Tampa-based Championship Wrestling from Florida (CWF) promotion. In September, he would defeat Rex King and Scotty the Body (the future Raven) in house show matches. He was defeated by Jim Backlund in a "Loser Leaves Town" match on November 30, 1988.

=== Jim Crockett Promotion (1988–1989) ===
In December 1988, Runnels debuted in Jim Crockett Promotions (JCP). Rhodes teamed with Kendall Windham in an undercard tag team called the Texas Broncos who saw success against the Cruel Connection and The Commandos. Their first defeat came against The Original Midnight Express at a house show on December 10, 1988, in Philadelphia, Pennsylvania. Rhodes' first singles match came two days later at a television taping in Atlanta, Georgia when he defeated Trent Knight. Rhodes' run lasted only a few months, as he exited the company two months after his father. After suffering a loss to Butch Reed during a dark match for an NWA Main Event taping in The Omni on February 12, 1989, Rhodes closed out his run with a win over Trent Knight in Walterboro, South Carolina on February 24, 1989.

=== Professional Wrestling Federation (1989) ===
After departing the NWA, Rhodes rejoined the CWF, which had been renamed the Professional Wrestling Federation in March 1989 after Runnels' father, Dusty Rhodes, began wrestling there. He made his return on March 4, 1989, in Titusville, Florida, defeating Commando Boone via disqualification. Seven days later he achieved the biggest win of his career at this point, defeating Terry Funk via disqualification in Tampa.

On May 9, 1989 he captured his first ever championship, teaming with Mike Graham to defeat Southern Force (Bobby Jaggers and Black Bart) to win the PWF Tag Team Championship. Fourteen days later, Runnels captured the NWA Florida Heavyweight Championship from Al Perez on May 23, 1989, holding it for a month and successfully defending it against the Big Steel Man and The Terminator. He was defeated for the NWA Florida Championship on June 27 by former Texas Bronco partner Kendall Windham in Tampa, Florida.

=== All Japan Pro Wrestling (1989–1990) ===
In March 1989, Runnels toured Japan for All Japan Pro Wrestling (AJPW) in its annual Champion Carnival, under the name "Dusty Rhodes Jr.". He returned to AJPW for further tours in the spring and summer of 1990.

=== United States Wrestling Association (1989–1990) ===
Runnels began wrestling in the United States Wrestling Association (USWA) in July 1989. There, he feuded mainly with Tony Anthony for Anthony's CWA Heavyweight Championship but never won the title. On October 2, 1989 he entered a tournament to crown the USWA Southern Heavyweight Champion, where he defeated Mike Davis, Chris Champion, and Kevin Dillinger in successive rounds before losing to Tony Anthony in the finals. He left the USWA in the spring of 1990.

=== World Wrestling Federation (1990–1991) ===
In the spring of 1990, the World Wrestling Federation embarked on a wave of signings of young talent, bringing in Pat Tanaka, Paul Diamond, and Shane Douglas. Dustin Rhodes was added to that list, as he made his debut for the WWF in a dark match on April 24 in San Antonio, Texas at a Wrestling Challenge television taping, defeating Black Bart. He began full time competition for the company that summer, competing at first exclusively on the house show circuit. He made his debut on July 15, 1990 at an event in Kansas City, Missouri, where he was defeated by Haku. As the summer progressed, Dustin would dominate opening card performers like Bob Bradley, The Brooklyn Brawler and Buddy Rose but in turn would be defeated by Haku, Hercules, Paul Roma, and Akeem.

Runnels made his television debut in September. Wrestling as "Dustin Rhodes", his first match was against Paul Diamond on WWF on MSG Network on September 21, 1990. On the October 22 episode of Prime Time Wrestling, he was shown in the crowd, watching his father take on Randy Savage. During the match, Ted Dibiase and Virgil - who were feuding at the time with Dusty, attacked the younger Rhodes leading his father to abandon the match to make the save. Dustin would then challenge Dibiase to a match, with the heel saying that he could not last ten minutes in the ring with him. On the November 3, 1990 episode of Superstars, Rhodes defeated Ted DiBiase in a televised ten-minute challenge match.

On the same night at a house show in August, Georgia, father and son teamed for the first time and defeated Dibiase and Virgil. On the December 8 episode of Superstars, Dibiase attempted to acquire the services of Dustin. Rhodes rejected the offer and was attacked by Dibiase and Virgil, leading to another father and son matchup against the two. This time it would be on PPV, with Dustin making his PPV debut. On January 19, 1991, at the Royal Rumble, Rhodes and his father Dusty lost to Ted DiBiase and Virgil in a tag team bout, and both left immediately after.

=== World Championship Wrestling (1991–1995) ===
==== Teaming with Barry Windham (1991–1992) ====
In February 1991, Runnels made his return to Jim Crockett Promotions - since renamed World Championship Wrestling - wrestling as "The Natural" Dustin Rhodes. His return match came on February 4, where he defeated Rip Rogers on the February 16 episode of World Championship Wrestling. He feuded with Larry Zbyszko until April 1991, when he refused to join Alexandra York's York Foundation, thus beginning a feud with Foundation member Terrence Taylor.

In late 1991, Rhodes formed a tag-team with Barry Windham and began pursuing WCW World Tag Team Champions the Enforcers (Zbyszko and Arn Anderson). The pair received a title shot at Clash of the Champions XVII, but Windham was (kayfabe) injured prior to the event by the champions when they slammed a car door on his wrist. A returning Ricky Steamboat was chosen to partner Rhodes, and the makeshift duo won the WCW World Tag Team Championship. They lost the title on January 16, 1992, to Arn Anderson and fellow Dangerous Alliance member Bobby Eaton.

On a taped edition of WCW Saturday Night on September 2, 1992, Rhodes teamed with Windham to defeat Steve Williams and Terry Gordy for the unified WCW World Tag Team Championship and NWA World Tag Team Championship (their NWA title reign is not recognized by NWA); the match would air on October 3. They held the belts for around two months before losing them to Steamboat and Shane Douglas on the November 18 edition of Clash of the Champions XXI. Windham turned on Rhodes after the match when Rhodes refused to pin Steamboat after an accidental low blow.

==== United States Heavyweight Champion (1993–1995) ====
In January 1993, Rhodes reached the final of a tournament to decide the number one contender for the WCW United States Heavyweight Championship. The champion, Rick Rude, was stripped of his title that same month, meaning the tournament final would be for the title. Rhodes faced his old partner Ricky Steamboat to win his first United States Heavyweight title. He successfully defended the title the following month at SuperBrawl III against Maxx Payne. Rude returned that April and quickly challenged Rhodes. Their first encounter resulted in a controversial double pin, with Rude initially being awarded the title. The championship was held up two weeks later. After a 30-minute Iron Man Match ended in a 1–1 draw at Beach Blast on July 18, a best-of-three series was set between the two on WCW Saturday Night; Rhodes lost the first match on August 28, but defeated Rude twice on September 4 and 11 to claim his second United States Heavyweight Championship.

At Fall Brawl, Rhodes teamed with Sting, Davey Boy Smith and The Shockmaster to defeat Big Van Vader, Sid Vicious and Harlem Heat in a WarGames match. Rhodes lost the title to Steve Austin in a two out of three falls match at Starrcade '93: 10th Anniversary, after losing two falls.

In March 1994, Rhodes started feuding with Bunkhouse Buck and Col. Robert Parker. After Parker introduced Arn Anderson and Terry Funk as adversaries for Runnels, Runnels responded by bringing his father, a former enemy of Funk, back into the ring to team with him again against Parker's Stud Stable. In December 1994, Parker introduced another opponent for Rhodes, Blacktop Bully. At the Uncensored pay-per-view on March 19, 1995, Rhodes lost to Blacktop Bully in the only King of the Road match in the company's history. The match, which was filmed several days earlier, resulted in both Rhodes and Blacktop Bully being fired from the company, as the two had bladed during the match after being instructed to by one another, which was against corporate policy at the time in WCW.

=== Return to WWF (1995–1999) ===
==== Debut of Goldust (1995–1997) ====
Goldust in 1995

World Wrestling Federation chairman Vince McMahon called Runnels and offered him the gimmick of "Goldust" McMahon mentioned "androgynous" several times in pitching the character; Runnels, wanting a separate identity from his father at the time, promptly accepted without knowing what the word "androgynous" meant, then promptly looked it up in the dictionary after getting off the phone with McMahon and shocked to see what it meant said to himself "What did I get myself in to?" Runnels himself admitted that the first few months of the gimmick were uncomfortable for him as it did not match his personality at all, but decided to work with what was given to him and "run with it".

Goldust was nicknamed "the Bizarre One" because of his somewhat spooky, mysterious, bashful presentation yet sexual suggestiveness turned aggressions. In communications, Goldust frequently took to comical flirtation while maintaining a bashfully deadpan and monotone delivery and presence. Using in-ring psychology to his advantage, Goldust often performed lewd and flirtatious mind games to anger, confuse, and distract his opponents. He engaged in such tactics as groping and excessive physical affection towards his opponent in the midst of delivering his onslaught. To that end, one of Goldust's trademarks was his exaggerated, suggestively breathy inhalation whilst caressing his own body; this display ended in him exhaling through a startlingly vicious biting sound directed at his adversaries (also said between his catchphrase of "You will never forget the name of... Goldust.") The character was portrayed as a drag queen obsessed with films and everything gold, which is a parody of the Oscars statuette. Adding to this aspect of the gimmick, Goldust often quoted or made references to classic Hollywood films during his promos. Under the gimmick, Runnels wore a predominately gold jumpsuit (with tads of other colors, such as white and black); black and gold face paint; and during entrances and promos, a glittery gold robe and a platinum blonde wig over his short platinum blonde hair.

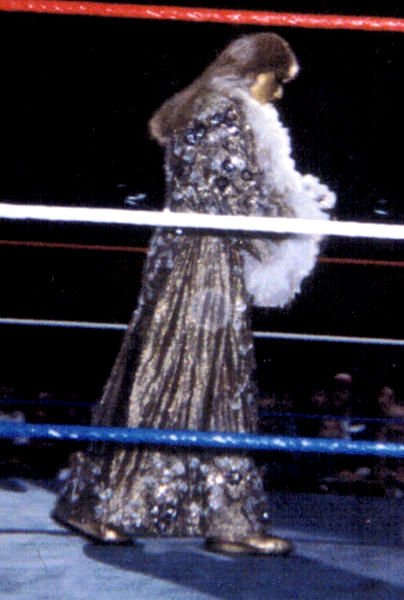
Goldust in 1995

After wrestling a dark match on August 29, 1995, at a WWF Superstars taping in a loss to Razor Ramon, Runnels made his televised return to the WWF under the Goldust persona in August 1995. He would defeat Bob Holly at In Your House 3 in a dark match. Goldust won his television debut match on October 22, 1995, against Marty Jannetty at the In Your House 4 pay-per-view. He defeated the departing Bam Bam Bigelow in Bigelow's last WWF match at the Survivor Series.

Goldust then feuded with Razor Ramon, whom he stalked and sent messages to throughout late 1995. The feud culminated at the Royal Rumble on January 21, 1996, where Goldust defeated Ramon for the WWF Intercontinental Championship due to interference from the 1–2–3 Kid. This match also marked the debut of Goldust's valet, Marlena, portrayed by his then wife, Terri Runnels. With her seductive, coolly unconcerned, mysterious character and fully gold-colored wear, Marlena complemented Goldust. Her gimmick consisted of sitting at ringside in a director's chair during Goldust's matches, advising him while smoking large brown cigars. A rematch between Goldust and Ramon at WrestleMania XII was canceled after Ramon was suspended, with Goldust instead fighting Roddy Piper in a Hollywood Backlot Brawl. At the end of the fight, Piper stripped Goldust of his ring attire to reveal him wearing women's lingerie; Runnels revealed in 2018 that it was his idea just three days before WrestleMania XII to wear a slip and thong underneath his ring attire and to have Piper strip him down, getting the approval from McMahon.

Still the Intercontinental Champion, Goldust defended his title in bouts against Savio Vega and Ultimate Warrior before losing the title to Ahmed Johnson at King of the Ring on June 23, 1996. In Summer 1996, Goldust briefly gained control over Mankind and feuded with The Undertaker. His attention soon turned to Marc Mero and his then wife Sable. Goldust and Marlena attempted to get Sable to join their team, but Mero won the feud and kept her by his side. He had a ladder match with Shawn Michaels at internet pay-per-view (iPPV) WWF The Xperience for the WWF Championship but lost the match.

In December 1996, Goldust entered a feud with Hunter Hearst Helmsley, when Helmsley began flirting with Marlena. This feud led to the debut of Chyna as Helmsley's new bodyguard and marked the first time Goldust became a fan favorite. Helmsley defeated Goldust at the Royal Rumble in January 1997, at WrestleMania 13 in March 1997, and at In Your House 14: Revenge of the 'Taker in April 1997.

In the summer and fall of 1997, Goldust joined other wrestlers in their conflict with the Hart Foundation, feuding in particular with Brian Pillman. Goldust defeated Pillman at SummerSlam. Pillman, via the stipulation, was forced to wear a dress for a month. Pillman challenged Goldust again to a match at Ground Zero: In Your House. Goldust agreed that if he lost, he would lose Marlena to Pillman for 30 days. Goldust lost the match to Pillman and was forced to lose Marlena. Had Goldust won, Pillman would leave the WWF. Just before the thirty days were up, Pillman died of heart disease hours before the Badd Blood: In Your House event on October 5, 1997.

==== Various gimmicks (1997–1999) ====
In November 1997, Goldust split with Marlena and refused to cooperate with his Survivor Series teammates, which once again turned him into a heel. This led to a feud with Vader in December 1997 and the appearance of "The Artist Formerly Known As Goldust" (a reference to Prince), managed by Luna Vachon. He began mimicking celebrities and fellow wrestlers with characters such as "Chynadust", "Dust Lovedust", "Dustydust", "Hunterdust", "Flashdust", "Marilyn Mansondust", "Sabledust", and "Vaderdust" in early 1998. Around this time, he made a legitimate push to management to get breast implants as part of the gimmick before being talked out of it by McMahon. In March 1998 at WrestleMania XIV, The Artist Formerly Known As Goldust and Luna Vachon lost to Marc Mero & Sable.

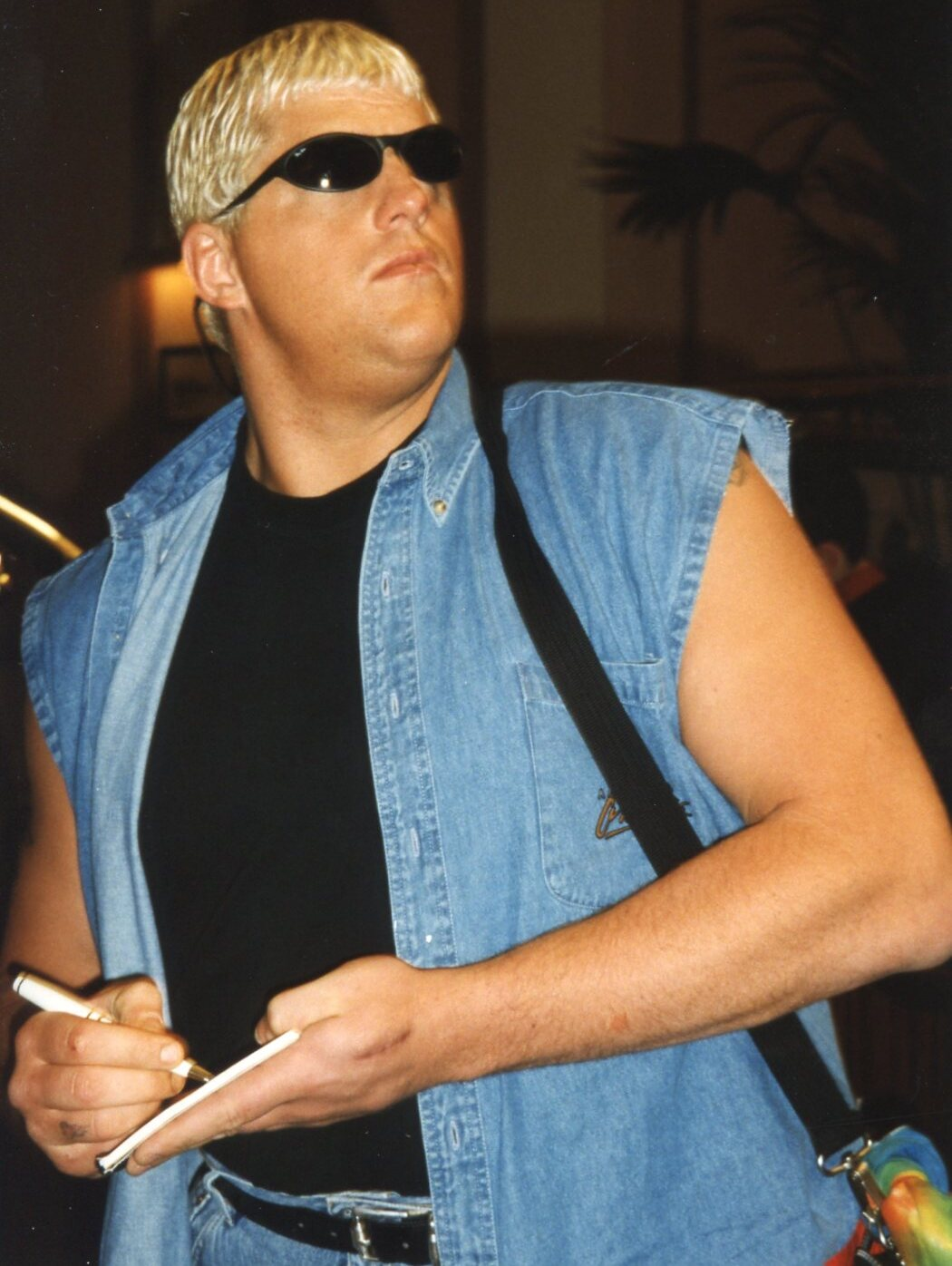
Dustin Runnels signing autographs in April 1998

In June 1998, Runnels abandoned the Goldust persona and began wrestling as "Dustin Runnels". He feuded with Val Venis, who had been involved with Terri during their separation. Now going by his real name, Runnels began speaking out (mostly in taped vignettes) on the increasingly edgy WWF product and promoting alternatives to watching the show such as reading the Bible. These vignettes were sponsored by the fictional group, "Evangelists Against Television, Movies and Entertainment", the acronym for which reads "EATME" – a thinly veiled joke on the WWF's part. Runnels declared himself a born again Christian, alluding to "his" return, and walking through the crowd with signs reading "he's coming back!" While the return of Jesus Christ was clearly implied, Runnels was in fact referencing the return of the Goldust gimmick. In September 1998 at Breakdown: In Your House, Venis defeated Runnels. The following month at Judgment Day: In Your House, Runnels reprised his Goldust persona, defeating Venis in a rematch.

In November 1998 at Survivor Series, Goldust entered the tournament for the vacant WWF Championship, losing to Ken Shamrock in the first round. He subsequently began feuding with Jeff Jarrett over the attention of Jarrett's manager, Debra. At Rock Bottom: In Your House in December 1998, Goldust defeated Jarrett.

In early 1999, Goldust feuded with Al Snow, upon stealing the mannequin Head, Snow's mascot, and The Blue Meanie, who had recently renamed himself "Bluedust" and adopted many of Goldust's mannerisms. After Goldust defeated Meanie at St. Valentine's Day Massacre: In Your House, Meanie became Goldust's apprentice. After Ryan Shamrock became Goldust's valet, Meanie and Shamrock began vying for Goldust's attention. In the same time period, Goldust won the Intercontinental Championship again from Road Dogg and then lost it to The Godfather two weeks later. He would team up with The Blue Meanie having a few matches against the Hardy Boyz.

In June 1999, Runnels left the WWF.

=== Return to WCW (1999–2001) ===
Runnels returned to WCW on the November 8, 1999, edition of WCW Monday Nitro, filming several vignettes for a fantastical, face-painted character named Seven. These vignettes contained ominous footage of Rhodes in full makeup standing outside a child's bedroom window. The gimmick was reported to have been based on "The Strangers" from the 1998 film noir Dark City. The character was dropped after Turner Standards and Practices expressed concern that this gimmick could be misinterpreted as a child abductor. Upon returning to WCW television, Rhodes removed his costume and delivered a worked shoot in which he mocked unrealistic gimmicks as well as his time as Goldust in the WWF. After turning heel upon his return, Runnels began wrestling as "The American Nightmare" Dustin Rhodes, with his nickname a reference to his father's nickname, "The American Dream". "The American Nightmare" moniker would later be used by Runnels' half brother, Cody Rhodes.

Rhodes feuded with Jeff Jarrett before feuding with Terry Funk. He was (kayfabe) fired by Vince Russo at Spring Stampede in April 2000 for failing to prevent Terry Funk from winning the vacant WCW Hardcore Championship, against Norman Smiley.

Runnels returned to WCW television in January 2001, assisting his father in his feud with Jarrett and, eventually, Ric Flair. He wrestled on the final WCW pay-per-view, WCW Greed on March 18, 2001. In March 2001, WCW was purchased by the World Wrestling Federation, but the WWF did not initially acquire Runnels' contract.

=== Turnbuckle Championship Wrestling (2001–2002) ===
In July 2001, Runnels, while still under contract to AOL Time Warner, began wrestling for his father's newly created Turnbuckle Championship Wrestling promotion, winning the promotion's Heavyweight Championship.

He would team up with his father. Competing as Dustin Rhodes, he captured the TCW Heavyweight Championship from Scotty Riggs on January 26, but vacated the title immediately afterwards after it was confirmed that he would be returning to WWF. Following his return to the WWF at the 2002 Royal Rumble, he made two more appearances with TCW, the first in a six-man tag team match with his father Dusty and Ron Studd against Riggs, Fake Goldust, and Jason Sugarmann, and the second in a singles victory over Steve Corino.

=== Second return to WWF/E (2001–2003) ===
==== Hardcore Champion (2001–2002) ====
In December 2001, Runnels accepted a buyout from his AOL Time Warner contract and was re-signed by the World Wrestling Federation to a two-year deal. Promos immediately began airing on WWF television advertising the return of Goldust. On January 20, 2002, he officially returned by taking part in the Royal Rumble, reprising his Goldust character. Shortly after returning, promos began airing for a few weeks of Goldust saying that there was a certain wrestler whose "star was shining brighter" than he would like. Goldust eventually revealed the person he was talking about was Rob Van Dam by attacking him on WWF Raw, turning heel in the process. Van Dam defeated Goldust in a singles match at No Way Out on February 17. After the loss, Goldust moved on to the hardcore division, where he won the WWE Hardcore Championship on nine occasions.

==== Teaming with Booker T (2002–2003) ====
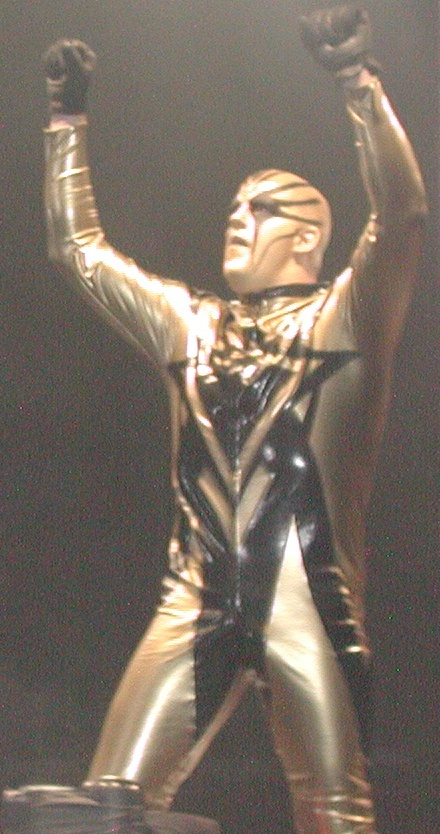
Goldust in 2003

When the World Wrestling Federation was renamed World Wrestling Entertainment and the roster was divided into two brands, Raw and SmackDown!, Goldust was assigned to the Raw brand, where he formed a tag team with Booker T. The duo engaged in numerous comedic vignettes, on one occasion hosting a segment titled Booker T and Goldust at the Movies and delivering reviews of The Scorpion King, a film starring The Rock. In May 2002, Booker T joined the New World Order (nWo), with Goldust's request to join the faction rejected. In June 2002, Booker T was ejected from the nWo by Shawn Michaels, sparking a feud between the nWo and Booker T and Goldust. Booker T and Goldust went on to compete in the tag team division, winning the World Tag Team Championship at Armageddon before being forced to split up on the February 3, 2003, episode of Raw by Raw General Manager Eric Bischoff for failing to win back the World Tag Team Championship.

Following the dissolution of the tag team, Goldust contracted a stutter and Tourette's-like symptoms, upon receiving a shock from a Round Tube during an attack at the hands of Batista and Randy Orton. Goldust appeared in character on The Howard Stern Show in March 2003. Goldust appeared sporadically thereafter, forming a tag team with Lance Storm in August 2003. In fall 2003, Booker T began receiving mysterious, haunting messages for a few weeks from somebody. The messages only said "I remember". It was rumored that the messages would be from Goldust, which would have begun a feud between the two. Suddenly, the angle was never mentioned again on television and the company announced on their website that they would not be renewing Rhodes's contract. WWE allowed Runnels' contract to expire in December 2003.

=== NWA Total Nonstop Action (2004–2005) ===
On February 4, 2004, Runnels debuted in NWA Total Nonstop Action (NWA TNA) as "The Lone Star" Dustin Rhodes, unsuccessfully challenging Jeff Jarrett for the NWA World Heavyweight Championship. On February 18, Runnels and El Leon defeated Kevin Northcutt and Legend in a tag team bout.

In December 2004, he returned to TNA, once again wrestling as Dustin Rhodes. On the January 7, 2005, episode of Impact!, Rhodes and Jeff Hardy defeated Kash and Dallas. On the January 14 episode of Impact!, Rhodes defeated Chris Candido. At Final Resolution on January 16, Rhodes defeated Kid Kash. On the February 11 episode of Impact!, Rhodes and America's Most Wanted defeated Kid Kash, Dallas and Raven in a six-man tag team match. At Against All Odds on February 13, Rhodes lost to Raven but got payback at Destination X on March 13 when he defeated Raven in a bullrope match. He then entered a feud with Bobby Roode and at Lockdown on April 24, Rhodes defeated Roode in a 2 out of 3 falls Prince of Darkness cage match. His TNA contract expired in April 2005 and he chose not to renew it, leaving TNA.

=== Third return to WWE (2005–2006) ===
Runnels returned to World Wrestling Entertainment on October 31, 2005, as a heel and back under the Goldust attire, as Jonathan Coachman enlisted him and Vader to attack Batista. Goldust and Vader unsuccessfully interfered in a street fight between Batista and Coachman on behalf of Coachman at Taboo Tuesday on November 1. Following the event, Goldust once again disappeared from television. In January 2006, Goldust took part in the Royal Rumble match and was assigned once again to the Raw brand until he was released from his WWE contract on June 14, 2006, for no-showing an appearance. Runnels made a short appearance at WrestleMania 22 to give Booker T advice on his match against The Boogeyman where he insinuated that the only way he could beat The Boogeyman was to put worms in his anus.^{[whose anus?]}

=== All Japan Pro Wrestling (2007) ===
On January 28, 2007, it was announced that Rhodes would appear at the February 17, 2007, All Japan Pro Wrestling show in the Ryōgoku Kokugikan in Tokyo. On February 15, Rhodes, identified as Gold Dustin, appeared at ringside during a match involving The Great Muta, resulting in a brawl between Rhodes and The Great Muta. On February 17, Rhodes and Jinsei Shinzaki were defeated by The Great Muta and Yoshihiro Tajiri in a tag team bout.

=== Return to TNA (2007–2008) ===
On July 15, 2007, Rhodes returned to Total Nonstop Action Wrestling at Victory Road and aligned himself with Christian Cage by helping him defeat "Wildcat" Chris Harris. In an interview on TNA Impact! conducted by Mike Tenay, Rhodes discussed accusations of having a split personality and stated that he was going to embrace it and let it out. TNA presented the interview as being an emotional breakdown on the part of Rhodes. On August 12 at Hard Justice, Rhodes debuted his new ring name, Black Reign, and a "new, darker and bizarre look". At Hard Justice, Harris defeated Black Reign via disqualification when Black Reign attacked several referees. The next week, the gimmick was explored even further, saying that Rhodes constantly switched between Rhodes and Black Reign. He was featured at Bound for Glory on October 14 in a Monster's Ball match against Rhino, Abyss, and Raven, which he lost. Black Reign challenged Abyss to a "Shop of Horrors" match at Genesis on November 11 and lost. At Genesis, Black Reign's new partner, Rellik, made his debut after attacking Abyss. At Turning Point on December 2, Abyss and Raven defeated Black Reign and Rellik in a "Match of 10,000 Tacks". Originally, this match was signed to be Abyss and Rhino versus Rellik and Black Reign but, due to an injury, Rhino was replaced by Raven for this match.

On Impact!, he helped Rellik beat up Kaz. Later the same night, he appeared for an interview, as Dustin Rhodes, without his Black Reign make-up and stated that his "alter ego" has been scaring him since when he was a little kid. His interview was interrupted by the furious Kaz. This led to a match between the two at Final Resolution on January 6, 2008 where Kaz won. Reign and his partner Rellik then began feuding with Super Eric. At Destination X on March 9, Black Reign and Rellik faced Eric Young and Kaz in a losing effort. At Lockdown on April 13, Black Reign and Rellik competed in a Six Team Cuffed in the Cage match which was won by Kaz and Super Eric. After three months of not showing up on television, Black Reign's profile was removed from the TNA roster page and he was released from his TNA contract.

=== Fourth return to WWE (2008–2012) ===
==== Various appearances (2008–2009) ====
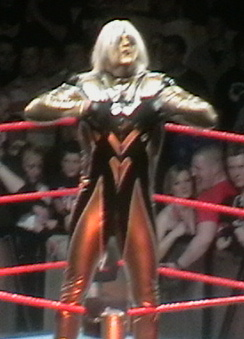
Goldust in 2009

On October 26, 2008, Runnels returned to WWE at Cyber Sunday under his Goldust persona as part of the three choices (the other two being Roddy Piper and The Honky Tonk Man) that the fans could choose to face Santino Marella for the WWE Intercontinental Championship. After Honky Tonk Man was chosen and won via disqualification, Goldust and Piper entered the ring and the three candidates fought Marella, afterwards celebrating together in the ring. The following night on Raw, Goldust appeared again with Piper and the Honky Tonk Man as guest commentators for Marella's match with Charlie Haas. The match ended when Goldust and Piper distracted Marella so that Honky Tonk Man could smash his guitar over Marella's head.

Goldust appeared on the celebration of the 800th episode of Raw on November 3, 2008, dancing alongside his father Dusty Rhodes, Lilian Garcia and several other wrestlers. A noticeably slimmer and quicker Goldust finally made a full-time return on the Raw roster once again on the November 24, 2008, episode of Raw, where he defeated Santino Marella.

Goldust participated in the 2009 Royal Rumble match and stared down his real-life half-brother, Cody Rhodes, but was eliminated by him later.

==== Brand switches and NXT (2009–2010) ====
On June 29, 2009, Goldust was traded to the ECW brand via a 15-man trade. His debut match for the brand came on the July 14 episode of ECW, in which he lost to Zack Ryder. In the upcoming weeks, he started a feud with Sheamus leading to his first televised singles win in several months on Superstars against Sheamus pinning him using an inside cradle. After several weeks of feuding, Sheamus defeated Goldust in a "No Disqualification" match on the September 1 episode of ECW on Syfy to end the feud.

Following this loss, he garnered his first number one contender's match for the ECW Championship on the September 15, 2009, episode of ECW on Syfy in a 10-Man Battle Royal where he was the seventh participant eliminated and Zack Ryder earning the title shot in the end. The September 29, 2009, episode of ECW on Syfy saw Goldust win his first match on ECW in an eight-man tag team match where Yoshi Tatsu pinned William Regal to score the win for their team. On the November 10 episode of ECW on Syfy, Goldust won his first televised singles match on the ECW brand by pinning Paul Burchill. Goldust participated in an "ECW Homecoming" Match on the December 22 episode of ECW on Syfy to determine who got an opportunity to challenge Christian for the ECW Championship, but was defeated by Vance Archer.

In early January, he teamed with Yoshi Tatsu and began a feud with ECW newcomers Trent Barreta and Caylen Croft. The duos exchanged victories in singles and tag team competition until the feud came to an end on the February 9 episode of ECW, when Goldust and Tatsu defeated Barreta and Croft in a match to determine the number one contenders to the Unified WWE Tag Team Championship. However, Goldust and Tatsu failed in capturing the titles on the final episode of ECW on Syfy. The team of Goldust and Yoshi Tatsu came to an end when Tatsu signed with the Raw brand after ECW on SyFy was canceled.

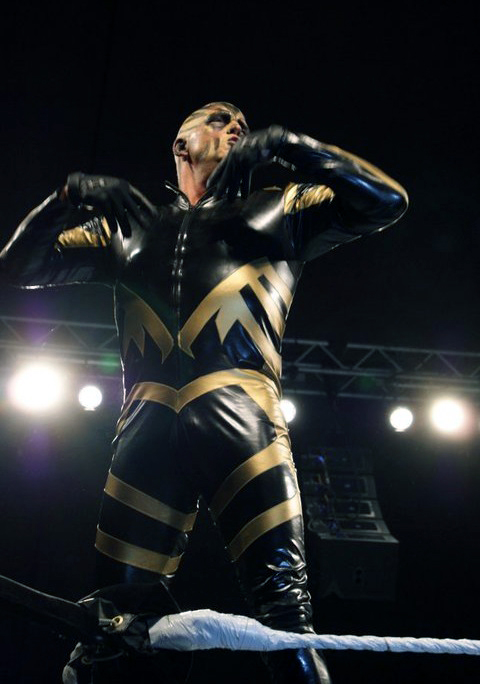
Goldust at a WWE live event in 2010

On March 3, 2010, Goldust joined the SmackDown brand, He made his debut for the brand on the March 4 episode of Superstars in a losing effort against Chris Jericho. The following week on Superstars, he won his first match as a SmackDown star after defeating Mike Knox using his finishing move, the Final Cut, as well as beating William Regal also using the Final Cut soon afterwards. He appeared in a dark 26-man battle royal match at WrestleMania XXVI, but failed to win, although his past ally Yoshi Tatsu won.

As part of the 2010 WWE Supplemental Draft, Goldust was drafted back to the Raw brand. On the May 3 episode of Raw, Goldust made his re-debut for the brand in a backstage segment with the guest host for that week, Wayne Brady. In late September, a mysterious stalker was sending messages to Maryse and Ted DiBiase Jr., but it was unsure who they were aimed at. On the October 4 episode of Raw, Goldust was revealed as the mystery stalker, but the messages were not directed to Maryse, but at DiBiase's Million Dollar Championship, which he then took.

During the season 2 finale of NXT on August 31, 2010, it was announced that Goldust would take part in NXT's third season as a Pro with Aksana as his Rookie. On the October 12 episode of NXT Goldust proposed to Aksana, who was facing deportation from the country, so she could stay in America. On the October 18 episode of Raw, DiBiase tried to reclaim his Million Dollar Championship after Goldust's match with Zack Ryder by attacking him, but he was unsuccessful in retrieving his belt. At Bragging Rights, DiBiase defeated Goldust, but Goldust still left with the title after Aksana distracted DiBiase long enough for Goldust to hit his finisher on him. Goldust and Aksana were married on the November 2 episode of NXT with father Dusty Rhodes and real-life half-brother "Dashing" Cody Rhodes in attendance. Immediately afterwards Aksana slapped Goldust and walked out on him. The following Monday on Raw Aksana stole the Million Dollar Championship belt during Goldust's match with Ted DiBiase. The following week on Raw Goldust managed to steal the Million Dollar Championship belt back from Aksana and then returned it to Ted DiBiase Sr., and on NXT he asked Aksana for a divorce after she was eliminated.

==== Backstage producer and departure (2011–2012) ====
On December 7, 2010, it was reported that Runnels had suffered a shoulder injury. He underwent surgery to repair the injury on December 10 and, as a result, was expected to be out of action for five to six months. On the April 11, 2011, episode of Raw, he was seen (without makeup) hugging Edge after his retirement speech. On July 11, Runnels began working backstage as a producer. On the November 29 episode of the Smackdown Live Holiday Special Goldust made his surprise return on a backstage segment with his father Dusty Rhodes. On the December 12 episode of the WWE Slammy Awards he appeared to announce the Slammy for A-Lister of The Year with Vickie Guerrero. On the December 30, 2011, episode of SmackDown Rhodes appeared in his suit attire and no make up, to defend Booker T and confront his half brother, Cody Rhodes. Rhodes made an appearance on the April 9, 2012, edition of Raw where he, along with numerous other WWE officials and Superstars, were attempting to break up a brawl between Brock Lesnar and John Cena. On May 6, 2012, WWE acknowledged Goldust's departure from the company.

=== Return to the independent circuit (2012–2013) ===
Runnels returned to professional wrestling on April 11, 2012, in Port St. Lucie, Florida, for Championship Wrestling Entertainment's event "WrestleFest", defeating JD Maverick in the main event. He then wrestled on July 14, 2012, in Hollywood, Florida, for the NWA Ring Warriors (part of NWA territories) promotion as Goldust, losing to Vordell Walker via disqualification when "Iceman" Buck Q interfered in the match. Runnels appeared for the Dreamwave Wrestling on September 15 in LaSalle, Illinois. Runnels continued to use the Goldust name outside WWE. Runnels appeared on Mr. Chainsaw Pro Wrestling's Battle Ground 5 event on May 18, 2013, in Kalkaska, Michigan, and billed as Dustin "Goldust" Rhodes.

=== Fifth return to WWE (2013–2019) ===
==== Teaming with Cody Rhodes (2013–2015) ====
Runnels returned to WWE as Goldust at the Royal Rumble on January 27, 2013, as the eighth participant in the Rumble match. He was eliminated by his half-brother, Cody Rhodes, teasing a possible feud. but Goldust later confirmed that his return was a one night only deal.

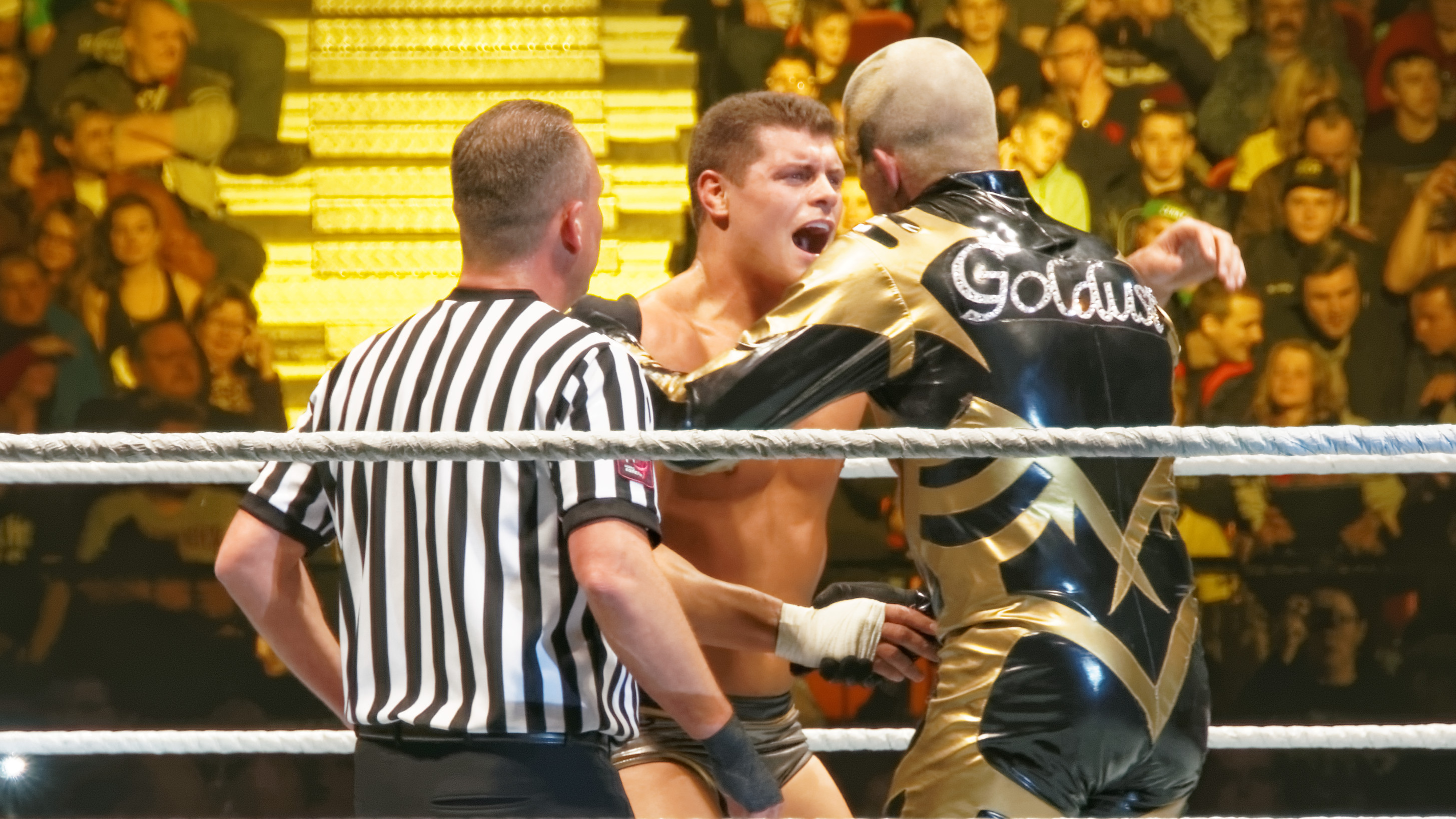
In 2013, Goldust returned to WWE, teaming with his half-brother Cody Rhodes.

When Cody was (kayfabe) fired for speaking out against chief operating officer Triple H and then losing to the WWE Champion Randy Orton, Goldust returned on the September 9 Raw to face Orton in a match to get his half-brother Cody Rhodes rehired, but was defeated. Following this, Goldust's father Dusty Rhodes returned to WWE to ask Stephanie McMahon for Cody to be rehired. After much dialogue in which The Shield and Big Show interrupted, Stephanie McMahon gave Dusty two choices, which were to get knocked out by an unwilling Big Show or get "mauled by The Shield." Big Show then knocked Dusty out and stayed with Dusty while the paramedics arrived. In return, the Rhodes brothers gatecrashed Raw by attacking the Shield. At Battleground, Cody and Goldust won their jobs back when they defeated the WWE Tag Team Champions, Seth Rollins and Roman Reigns in a non-title match. The Rhodes brothers heaped more misery on the Shield by winning a no disqualification match on the October 14 Raw (with the help of Big Show) to capture the tag titles, marking Goldust's first title in WWE in nearly 11 years. By this point, many longtime Goldust mannerisms such as wearing a robe and platinum blonde wig to the ring were dropped in exchange for wearing a jacket similar to his brother; additionally, Goldust would now speak with his normal Texan voice. At Hell in a Cell, the Rhodes brothers' first successful title defense came with winning a triple threat match against the Usos and Rollins and Reigns. At Survivor Series, Goldust alongside his half-brother Cody, participated in the traditional Survivor Series Tag Team match where Goldust survived till the final two alongside Rey Mysterio. However, he got eliminated by Roman Reigns and his team lost. At TLC: Tables Ladders and Chairs, the Rhodes Brothers retained the title in a fatal-4-way elimination match against Curtis Axel and Ryback, The Real Americans and Big Show and Rey Mysterio, but they lost the title to New Age Outlaws (Road Dogg and Billy Gunn) at the Royal Rumble. Later in the Royal Rumble match, he would accidentally eliminate Cody Rhodes. After continuing to team together for months, Goldust and Cody broke up in June, after mounting losses. Cody prompted Goldust to find a new partner to replace him.

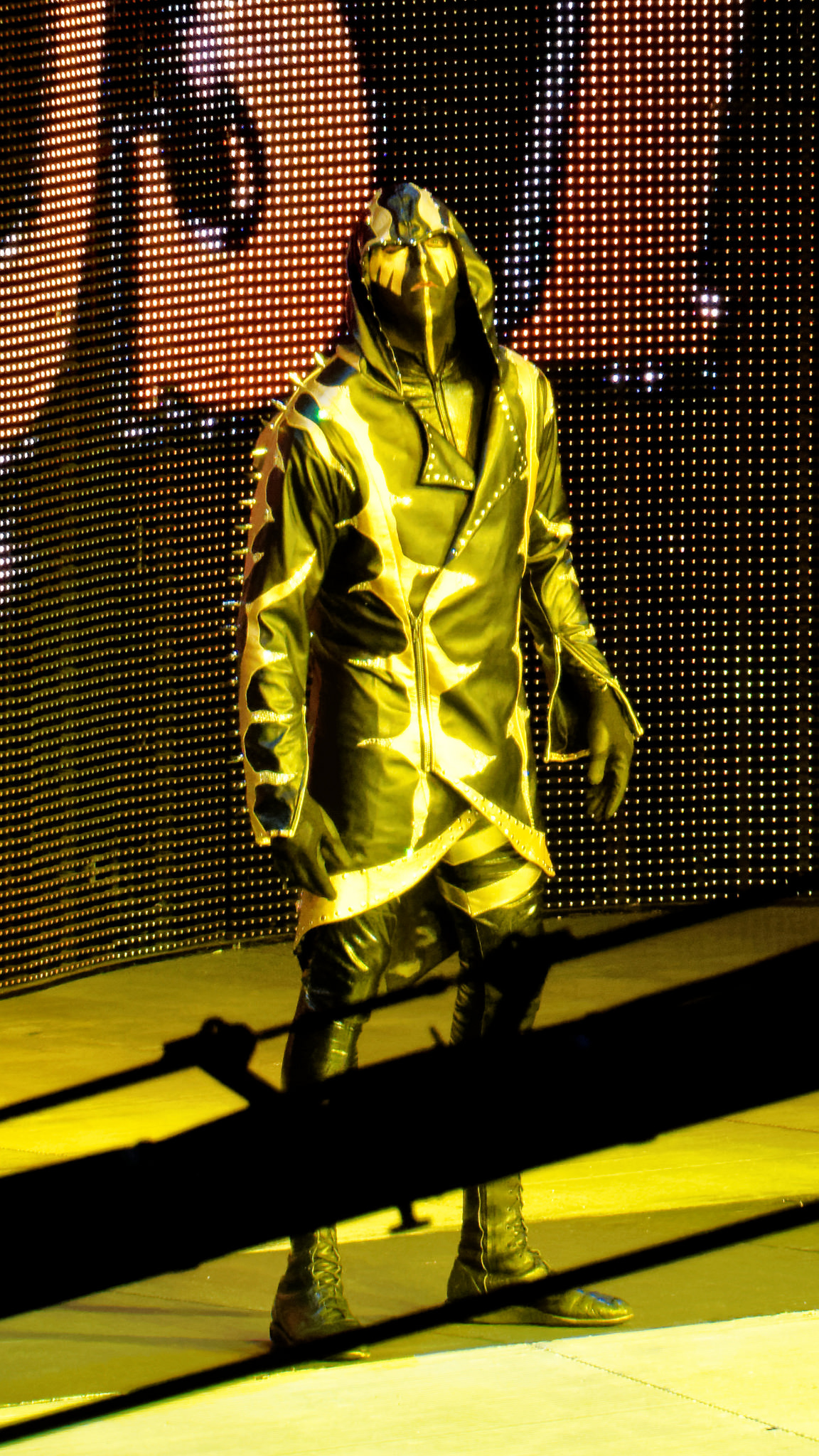
Goldust in 2015

On the June 16 episode of Raw, Cody debuted a new character, Stardust, wearing face paint and a bodysuit and adopting mannerisms similar to those of Goldust. At Money in the Bank, Goldust and Stardust defeated RybAxel (Curtis Axel and Ryback). Goldust and Stardust appeared in backstage segments, speaking of a "Cosmic Key". On the August 25 episode of Raw, Goldust and Stardust defeated The Usos in a title match via count-out, but, as a result, they did not win the title. The duo would then attack the Usos out of frustration, turning heel in the process. They confirmed their heel turn after attacking El Torito the following night on Main Event, having defeated Los Matadores in their tag team match. At Night of Champions they won the WWE Tag Team Championships once again by beating The Usos. At Hell in a Cell they retained their title by beating The Usos. At Survivor Series they lost the title to The Miz and Damien Mizdow. They had a rematch for the tag team titles the following night on Raw, but were unsuccessful.

On the February 2, 2015, episode of Raw, after being defeated by The Ascension, Stardust would start to show his frustrations toward Goldust. On the February 16 episode of Raw, following a loss to The New Day members Kofi Kingston and Xavier Woods, Stardust would turn on Goldust by using his old finisher, Cross Rhodes on him, marking the end of Gold and Stardust, turning Goldust face in the process. This led to a match at Fastlane, where Goldust defeated Stardust. Later that night, while speaking to their father, Dusty Rhodes, Goldust would be attacked by Stardust again. At WrestleMania 31, Goldust participated in the 2nd annual André the Giant Memorial Battle Royal, where he was eliminated by Ryback. On the March 30, 2015, episode of Raw, Goldust lost via submission to Rusev.

In May, Goldust announced that he would undergo surgery to address a shoulder injury and that he would be out of action for 2–4 months. Goldust made an appearance at NXT TakeOver: Respect without any facepaint to congratulate Finn Bálor and Samoa Joe after they won the Dusty Rhodes Tag Team Classic tournament.

Goldust returned from injury at Survivor Series, competing in a 5-on-5 traditional Survivor Series elimination tag team match during the pre-show, teaming with The Dudley Boyz, Neville and Titus O'Neil, where they defeated the team of Stardust, The Ascension, The Miz and Bo Dallas. Goldust would continue feuding with his brother, Stardust, on Raw and SmackDown during the months of November and December. On the December 17 episode of SmackDown, Goldust would cost Tyler Breeze his match against O'Neil after distracting Breeze by appearing at ringside. On the December 31 episode of SmackDown, Goldust would be defeated by Breeze.

==== The Golden Truth (2016–2017) ====
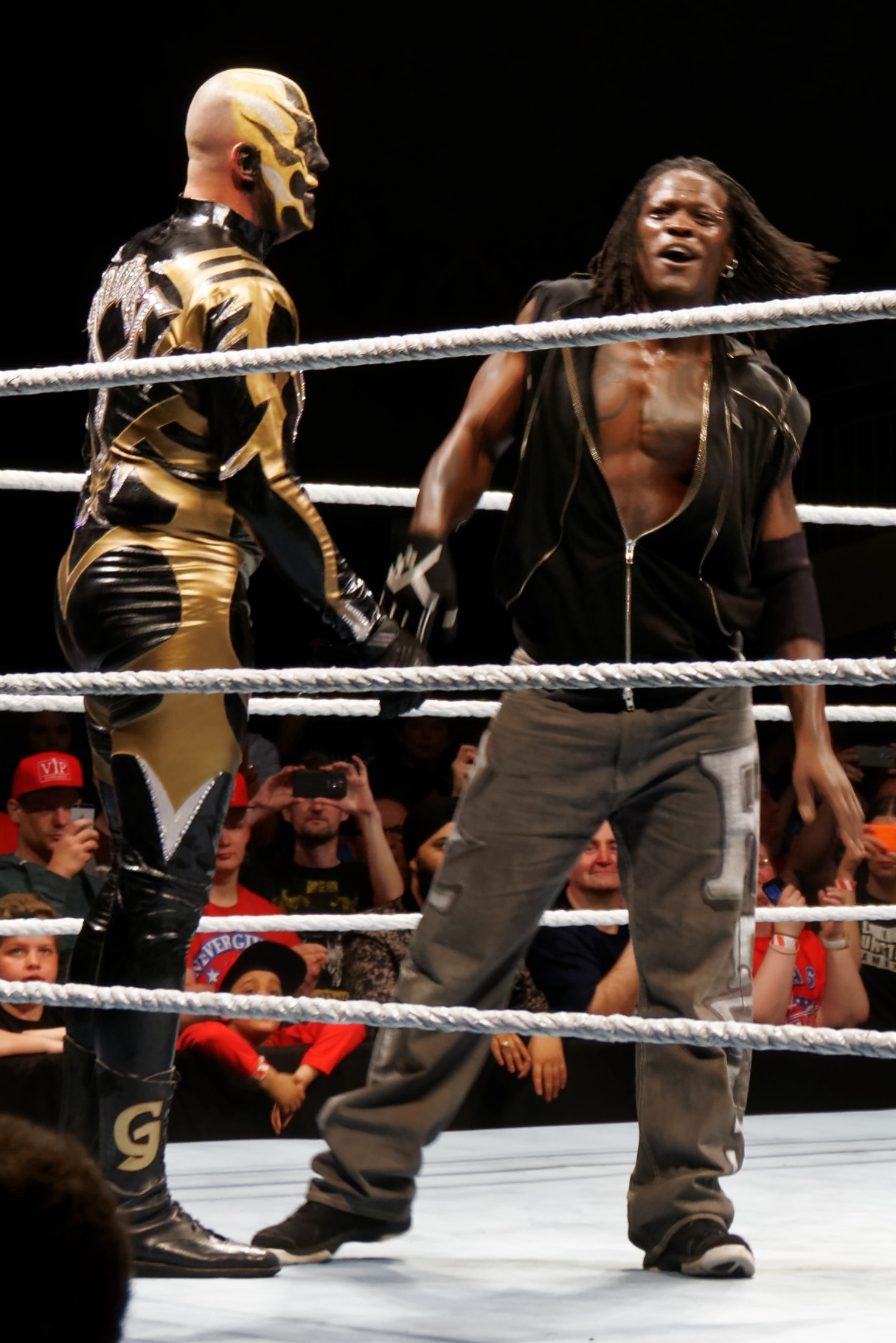
The Golden Truth in 2016

In early 2016, during various episodes of Raw and SmackDown, Goldust approached R-Truth and proposed they form a tag team to no avail. At Fastlane, Goldust inadvertently cost R-Truth his match against Curtis Axel. Following Fastlane, R-Truth began to apologize and attempt to form a tag team with Goldust, with Goldust rejecting. On the March 21 episode of Raw, Goldust came to R-Truth's aid after Truth was defeated by Bubba Ray Dudley. At WrestleMania 32, Goldust took part in the Andre the Giant Memorial Battle Royal in a losing effort. On the April 11 episode of Raw, Shane McMahon announced a number one contenders tournament for the WWE Tag Team Championship, which included Goldust and Truth teaming together. On the April 14 episode of SmackDown, Goldust would tell R-Truth before their match they would not team together, with Goldust instead teaming with Fandango, where they were defeated by The Vaudevillains in the first round. On the April 22 episode of Smackdown, Goldust was the special referee for the match of R-Truth and Fandango, which R-Truth won. On the May 2 episode of Raw, Goldust faced off against R-Truth's new partner, Tyler Breeze, in a losing effort following a distraction from R-Truth. On the May 12 episode of SmackDown, the two teams would face each other, with Goldust and Truth refusing to fight each other, resulting in Fandango and Breeze forming an alliance and attacking Goldust and R-Truth, with Fandango subsequently allowing Breeze to pin Goldust. On the May 16 episode of Raw, Goldust and Truth began teaming together, where they were defeated by the newly dubbed Breezango (Fandango and Breeze). The week after on SmackDown, Golden Truth started a losing streak, losing to the likes of Breezango and The Dudley Boyz. Golden Truth earned their first victory on the Money in the Bank pre-show after defeating Breezango.

In the 2016 WWE Draft, Goldust, along with R-Truth, was drafted to Raw. The Golden Truth later entered into a feud with The Shining Stars. On the July 25 episode of Raw, The Golden Truth would enter the ring during a tag team match between Enzo and Cass and The Shining Stars, playing Pokémon Go! Over a number of months The Shining Stars would attempt to persuade R-Truth into purchasing a one-way ticket to Puerto Rico which saw Goldust continually but in and save R-Truth from being conned. On the August 1 episode of Raw, The Golden Truth would be defeated by The Shining Stars. On the October 17 episode of Raw, The Golden Truth were joined by Mark Henry in their feud against the Shining Stars. They would go on to defeat The Shining Stars & Titus O'Neil in an 8-man tag team match on the same episode of Raw. On the October 31 episode of Raw, Goldust would compete in a battle royal with the winner being added to Team Raw at Survivor Series. Goldust was unsuccessful with Braun Strowman winning the battle royal and joining Team Raw in the process. The Golden Truth were later announced as members of the 10-man Survivor Series Raw Tag Team stable but later lost their spots a week later when it was revealed R-Truth had sold their spots on the team to the Shining Stars for tickets to Puerto Rico. On the November 7 episode of Raw, The Shining Stars defeated The Golden Truth to join Team Raw. On the November 28 episode of Raw, Goldust attacked Braun Strowman after his victory over R-Truth. Sami Zayn would then run into the ring and help in attacking Strowman. At WWE Tribute to the Troops on December 14, The Golden Truth competed in a Fatal 4-Way tag team match to determine the #1 contenders to the WWE Tag Team Championship against Cesaro and Sheamus, Gallows and Anderson, and The Shining Stars, which was won by Cesaro and Sheamus.

On the March 27, 2017, episode of Raw, the Golden Truth was confirmed for the 4th annual André the Giant Memorial Battle Royal at WrestleMania 33, however neither one of them was successful in winning. On the April 17 episode of Raw, The Golden Truth were going to compete against Luke Gallows and Karl Anderson but were attacked backstage by Braun Strowman, leaving Enzo Amore and Big Cass to take The Golden Truth's place in the match.

On the May 8 episode of Raw, The Golden Truth participated in the tag team turmoil match for the No. 1 Contenders spot against The Hardy Boyz, but lost to Cesaro and Sheamus. On the May 15 episode of Raw, R-Truth apologized to Goldust for "letting the team down" and Goldust replied by saying they "win and lose as a team". Later that night, Goldust attacked R-Truth before a match against Gallows and Anderson, turning heel for the first time since 2015 and breaking up The Golden Truth.

==== Final feuds and departure (2017–2019) ====
On the May 22 episode of Raw, a vignette was aired with Goldust, stating that he was in the director's chair and that "the Golden Age is back", starting a feud with R-Truth. Around this time, he started wearing his older attires from when he first debuted. On the July 10 episode of Raw, Goldust defeated R-Truth, concluding their feud. On the August 28 episode of Raw, Goldust participated in the 15-man battle royal for a shot at the Intercontinental Championship. Goldust was unsuccessful though, as he was eliminated by Luke Gallows.

On the September 11 episode of Raw, Goldust faced Bray Wyatt in a losing effort. After the match, Wyatt used a towel to remove his facepaint, saying he was "just a man", as a shot towards the face and body paint Wyatt's rival Finn Bálor would use. The next week on Raw, under his real name and without his signature facepaint (although still using Goldust's theme and ring attire), Rhodes faced Wyatt once again in a losing effort. Bálor ran down to help Rhodes after the match, when Wyatt continued to attack him. Rhodes, however, resented the help and attacked Bálor during a confrontation backstage on the September 25 episode of Raw. He had a match against Bálor later that night, but was defeated. At Starrcade, he competed as "The Natural" Dustin Rhodes, defeating Dash Wilder with the bulldog.

On the January 1, 2018, episode of Raw, Rhodes, now back as Goldust, teamed with Cedric Alexander to defeat Drew Gulak and Ariya Daivari. A rematch took place on the January 2 episode of 205 Live, a show usually reserved for competitors under 205 pounds. At the Royal Rumble, Goldust entered the Royal Rumble match at number 29, but was eliminated by Dolph Ziggler. In January, Goldust was announced as a competitor in the WWE Mixed Match Challenge alongside Alicia Fox. Fox was replaced by Mandy Rose after an injury, and Goldust and Rose lost in the first round to Jimmy Uso and Naomi on February 6. On the March 5 episode of Raw, Goldust would confront and attack John Cena during a promo, stating he would "shatter his dreams", but was subsequently defeated by Cena that same night. On the April 2 episode of Raw, Goldust cut a backstage promo where he announced his participation in the upcoming André The Giant Memorial Battle Royal match at WrestleMania 34, and lost a match to "Woken" Matt Hardy that same night. At WrestleMania 34, Goldust participated in the Andre the Giant Memorial Battle Royal, where he eliminated R-Truth. At the Greatest Royal Rumble, Goldust entered the aforementioned match at number 18 and lasted 10 minutes before being eliminated by Bobby Roode. In July, Goldust underwent surgery on both knees. On March 28, 2019, it was reported by Pro Wrestling Sheet that Goldust left WWE after his contract expired, thus ending his six-year tenure with the promotion. Goldust confirmed his departure on April 21, 2019, stating he asked for his release.

=== All Elite Wrestling / Ring of Honor (2019–present) ===
==== Various storylines (2019–2024) ====
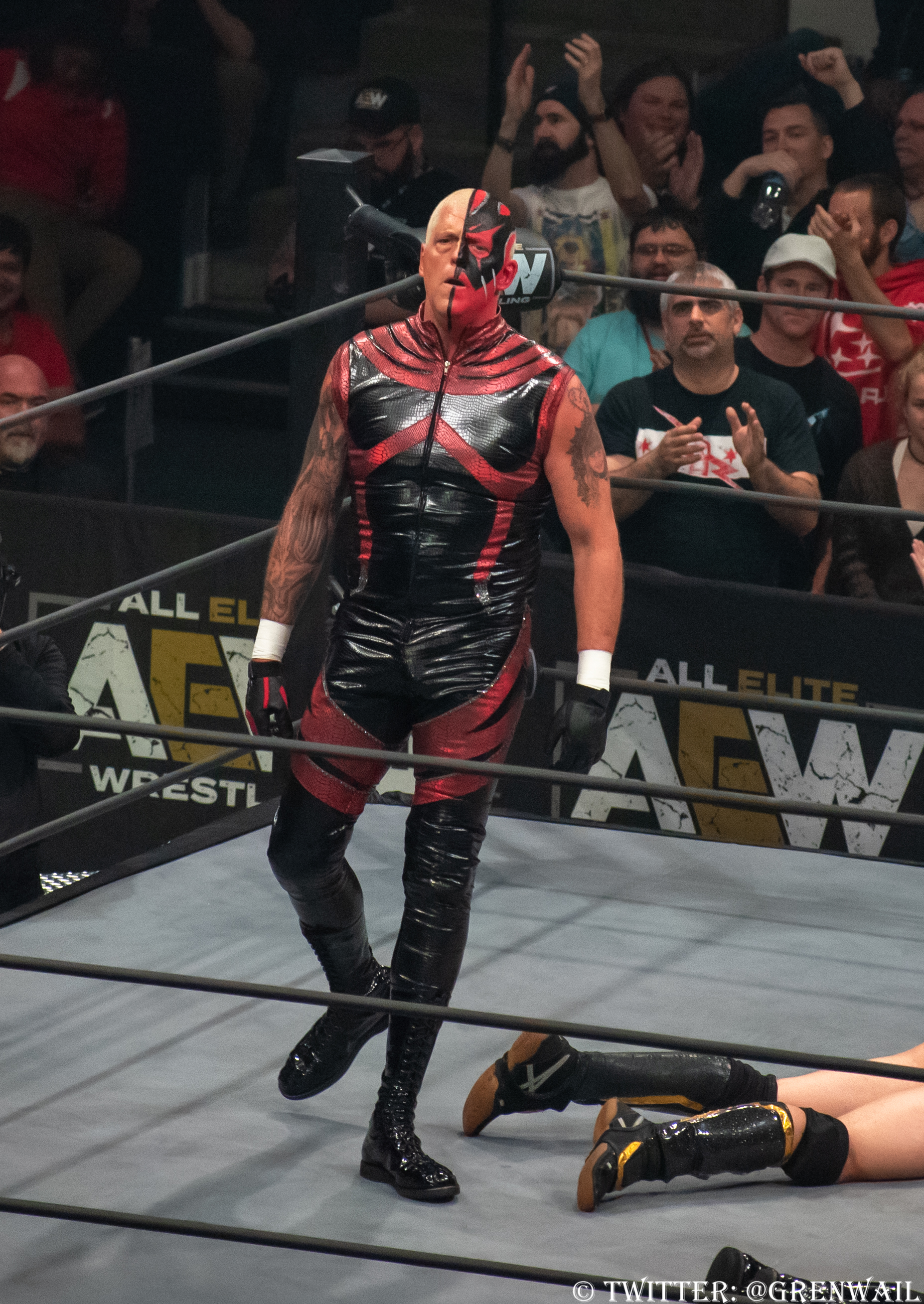
Rhodes in AEW in October 2019

On April 20, 2019, it was revealed on "Road to Double or Nothing" that Rhodes would face his real life half-brother, Cody, at All Elite Wrestling (AEW)'s Double or Nothing pay-per-view. At Double or Nothing on May 25, Runnels, under his old gimmick as "The Natural", failed to win but received critical acclaim for his match with his brother. Post-match, the brothers embraced after the announcement they would reunite to face The Young Bucks at the Fight for the Fallen event on July 13. On August 2, 2019, it was announced that Dustin Rhodes had signed a multi-year deal with All Elite Wrestling as wrestler and coach. On the premiere episode of AEW Dynamite on October 2, Rhodes returned to TNT for the first time in over 18 years, Rhodes, The Young Bucks and his half-brother Cody were attacked by The Inner Circle (Chris Jericho, Santana and Ortiz, Sammy Guevara and Jake Hager). On the October 22, 2019, episode of AEW Dark, Runnels picked up his first victory, by pinning Cima, in an 8-Man Tag Team Match. On the October 23, 2019, episode of Dynamite where he helped his brother Cody and MJF attack Chris Jericho and his stable The Inner Circle. Runnels' feud with The Inner Circle concluded when he lost to Jake Hager in Hager's AEW debut match at Revolution. On the Road to Double or Nothing special, Rhodes announced that if he were to lose to Kip Sabian in the first round of the TNT Championship tournament then he would retire. On the April 22, 2020, episode of Dynamite, Rhodes defeated Kip Sabian to win the quarterfinals match and advance to the second round of the TNT Championship Tournament. The second round saw him facing "The Murderhawk" Lance Archer, with Rhodes losing the match. During the May 20 broadcast of Dynamite, Shawn Spears insulted Rhodes and his family during a segment, setting up a match between the two at the Double or Nothing on May 23, 2020. During his Double or Nothing return match, Rhodes ripped Spears' clothes and won via pinfall after hitting the Final Reckoning (Curtain Call). Rhodes and Q. T. Marshall who first teamed as "The Natural Nightmares" on February 19, unsuccessfully challenged for the AEW World Tag Team Championship against Kenny Omega and Adam Page on the June 17 Dynamite. To avenge Cody losing the TNT Championship to Brodie Lee, Rhodes and Marshall teamed with Matt Cardona and Scorpio Sky at All Out, defeating The Dark Order (Brodie Lee, Colt Cabana, Evil Uno and Stu Grayson). After the match, Rhodes challenged Brodie for the TNT Championship on the following Dynamite, which he lost.

On the November 11, 2020, episode of Dynamite, the "Natural Nightmares" teamed up again to defeat The Butcher and the Blade in a bunkhouse match. On the December 9, 2020, episode of Dynamite, Rhodes defeated 10 by pinfall. At AEW Battle of the Belts on January 8, 2022, Rhodes lost to Sammy Guevara in an Interim AEW TNT Championship title match. In early 2023, Rhodes began a tag team with Keith Lee, dubbing themselves "Naturally Limitless". In their first match as a tag team, they defeated Mogul Affiliates (Swerve Strickland and Parker Boudreaux) on the March 3, 2023 episode of Rampage, and they continued to team together throughout the year. On the July 1, 2023, episode of AEW Collision, Rhodes competed in the Owen Hart Foundation Men's Tournament, losing to Powerhouse Hobbs in the quarterfinals of the tournament. At AEW Worlds End in December 2023, Rhodes lost to Swerve Strickland, substituting for the injured Keith Lee.

==== Sons of Texas (2024–present) ====
In July 2024, Rhodes debuted in AEW's sister promotion, Ring of Honor, at Death Before Dishonor, teaming with Marshall and Ross Von Erich to defeat The Dark Order to earn a shot at the vacant ROH World Six-Man Tag Team Championship. At Battle of the Belts XI later that month, Rhodes and the Von Erichs defeated Undisputed Kingdom to win the Championships. On the August 17 episode of AEW Collision, Rhodes teamed with Guevara to defeat the Undisputed Kingdom to win the ROH World Tag Team Championship, thus becoming a double champion in ROH. Rhodes, Guevara, and the Von Erichs then combined to form a stable known as the Sons of Texas, explaining that they are all Texas natives and have connections to Texas wrestling legends (Rhodes and the Von Erichs through their respective families, and Guevara was trained by Rhodes's former WWE partner and Texas native Booker T). At All In in August 2024, the Sons of Texas teamed with Katsuyori Shibata to defeat Undisputed Kingdom and Cage of Agony in a 10-man tag team match. On December 20 at Final Battle, Rhodes and Guevara successfully defended their titles against The Righteous (Vincent and Dutch) in a Texas Bullrope match.

On January 5, 2025 at Wrestle Dynasty, Rhodes and Guevara successfully defended their titles against House of Torture's Sho and Yoshinobu Kanemaru. On May 25 at Double or Nothing, Rhodes and Guevara unsuccessfully challenged The Hurt Syndicate (Bobby Lashley and Shelton Benjamin) for the AEW World Tag Team Championship. On July 11 at Supercard of Honor, Rhodes and Guevara successfully defended their titles against The Infantry (Carlie Bravo and Shawn Dean). The next day at All In, Rhodes defeated Guevara, Daniel Garcia, and Kyle Fletcher in a four-way match to win the vacant AEW TNT Championship. This marked Rhodes' first singles championship in AEW/ROH and made him a triple champion between both promotions. On the July 31 episode of Collision, Rhodes lost his title to Fletcher in a Chicago Street Fight, ending his reign at 19 days. After the match, Rhodes announced that he would undergo double knee replacement surgery and would be out indefinitely, vacating both the ROH World Six-Man and ROH World Tag Team Championships.

== Filmography ==
Film
Year	Title	Role	Notes
2014	Meet Me There	Preacher Woodward	
2015	The Murders of Brandywine Theater	Officer	
2016	Scooby-Doo! and WWE: Curse of the Speed Demon	Goldust	Voice
2019	Scare Package	The Devil's Lake Impaler	"Horror Hypothesis"
2020	Copper Bill	Mitchell White	

Television
Year	Title	Role	Notes
2020	Misanthrope	Nate Doolan	"Stolen Valor"
2021	Rhodes To The Top		

== Video games ==
WCW video games
Year	Title	Notes
1994	WCW: The Main Event	Video game debut as Dustin Rhodes
1994	WCW SuperBrawl Wrestling	

WWE video games
Year	Title	Notes
1996	WWF In Your House	Video game debut as Goldust
1998	WWF War Zone	
1999	WWF Attitude	
2001	WWF With Authority!	
2002	WWE SmackDown! Shut Your Mouth	
2003	WWE WrestleMania XIX	
2003	WWE Raw 2	
2003	WWE SmackDown! Here Comes the Pain	
2009	WWE SmackDown vs. Raw 2010	
2010	WWE SmackDown vs. Raw 2011	
2011	WWE '12	
2012	WWE '13	Downloadable content
2014	WWE 2K15	Motion capture
2015	WWE 2K16	Motion capture
2016	WWE 2K17	Motion capture
2017	WWE 2K18	Motion capture
2018	WWE 2K19	Motion capture

AEW Video games
Year	Title	Notes
2023	AEW Fight Forever	

== Other media ==
Rhodes appeared in Black Moth Super Rainbow's video for "Hairspray Heart", from their album Cobra Juicy.

== Personal life ==
Runnels was previously married to Terri Runnels. They have a daughter together. The couple divorced after six years of marriage on October 18, 1999. The two became grandparents in 2023. Runnels also has a stepchild.

In a 2016 Facebook post, Runnels reported that his stepchild, who is transgender, had been attacked by three men, condemning anti-transgender attitudes as "hateful crap". He later reiterated his opposition to transphobia in a 2020 Twitter post.

Runnels' autobiography, Cross Rhodes: Goldust, Out of the Darkness, was released on December 14, 2010. In the book, Runnels mentioned that he was married a second time to an unnamed woman. "I also had a short-lived and highly volatile second marriage. We only dated for a few months, then, one day, we just went to the justice of the peace and did the deed." He was referring to Milena Martelloni, whom he married on December 18, 2002; they divorced in 2003. Runnels married his third wife, Ta-rel Marie Roche, on June 22, 2012.

Runnels has an English Mastiff named Beast that has won multiple dog show prizes including a third place finish at the 2026 Crufts tournament in the working group open category.

== Championships and accomplishments ==
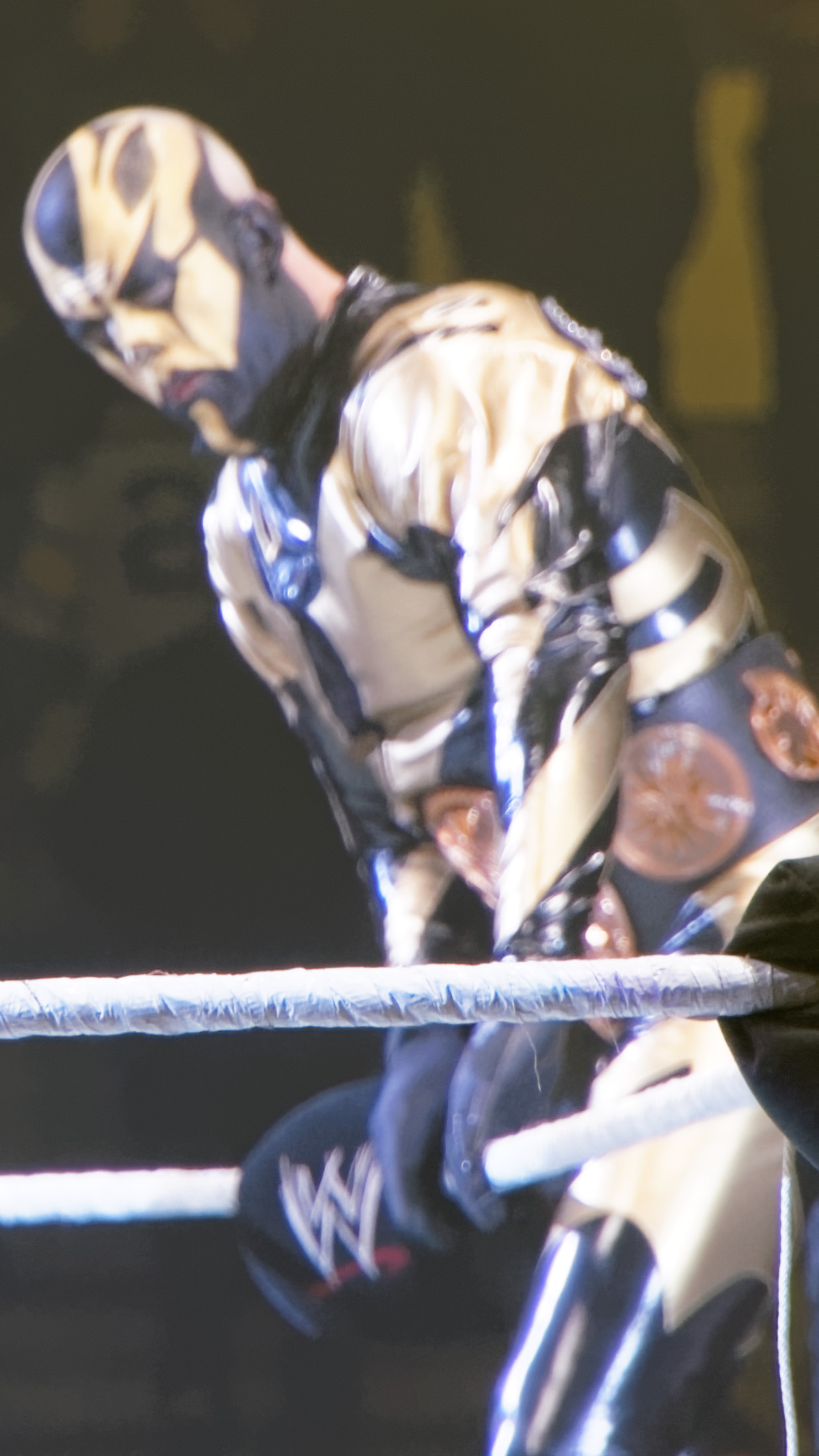
In WWE as "Goldust", Rhodes is a two-time WWE Tag Team Champion, and three-time tag team champion overall.

- All Elite Wrestling
  - AEW TNT Championship (1 time)
- American Combat Wrestling
  - ACW Heavyweight Championship (1 time)
- Championship Wrestling from Florida
  - NWA Florida Heavyweight Championship (1 time)
  - FCW Tag Team Championship (1 time) – with Mike Graham
- Coastal Championship Wrestling
  - CCW Heavyweight Championship (1 time)
- Professional Wrestling Federation
  - PWF Florida Championship (1 time)
- Pro Wrestling Illustrated
  - Comeback of the Year (2013)
  - Match of the Year (2019) – vs. Cody at Double or Nothing
  - Most Improved Wrestler of the Year (1991)
  - Ranked No. 11 of the top 500 singles wrestlers in the PWI 500 in 1996
  - Ranked No. 126 of the top 500 singles wrestlers of the "PWI Years" in 2003
- Ring of Honor
  - ROH World Tag Team Championship (1 time) – with Sammy Guevara
  - ROH World Six-Man Tag Team Championship (1 time) – with Marshall Von Erich and Ross Von Erich
- Turnbuckle Championship Wrestling
  - TCW Heavyweight Championship (1 time)
- World Championship Wrestling
  - WCW United States Heavyweight Championship (2 times)
  - WCW World Six-Man Tag Team Championship (1 time) – with Big Josh and Tom Zenk
  - WCW World Tag Team Championship (2 times) – with Ricky Steamboat (1) and Barry Windham (1)
  - NWA World Tag Team Championship (1 time) – with Barry Windham
  - WCW United States Heavyweight Championship Tournament (1993)
- Wrestling Observer Newsletter
  - Most Embarrassing Wrestler (1997)
  - Most Improved (1991)
  - Rookie of the Year (1989)
  - Worst Gimmick (1995) as Goldust
  - Worst Gimmick (1997) as The Artist Formerly Known As Goldust
  - Worst Gimmick (2007) as Black Reign
- WWE/World Wrestling Entertainment/Federation
  - WWF Intercontinental Championship (3 times)
  - WWF Hardcore Championship (7 times)
  - World Tag Team Championship (1 time) – with Booker T
  - WWE Tag Team Championship (2 times) – with Cody Rhodes/Stardust
  - Slammy Award (4 times)
    - Best Couple (1997) with Marlena
    - Frequent Tweeter (2010)
    - "You Still Got It" Best Superstar Return of the Year (2013)
    - Tag Team of the Year (2013) – with Cody Rhodes
