= Jeff Gaylord =

American wrestler (1958–2023)

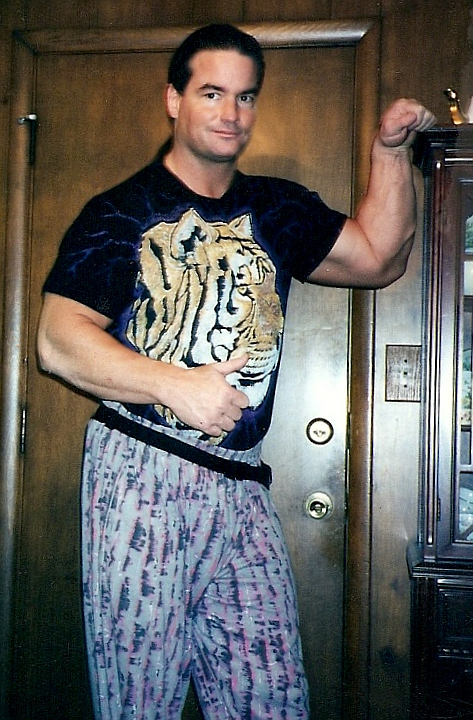

Personal information
- Born: Jeff Gaylord; October 15, 1958 Columbus, Ohio, U.S.
- Died: March 15, 2023 (aged 64) Englewood, Colorado, U.S.
- Education: University of Missouri

Professional wrestling career
- Ring name(s): Akeem Hassain; The Black Knight; The Hood; Jeff Gaylord; The New Spoiler
- Billed height: 6 ft 3 in (191 cm)
- Billed weight: 260 lb (118 kg)
- Debut: 1985
- Retired: 1998

Jeff Gaylord (October 15, 1958 – March 15, 2023) was an American professional wrestler who competed in North American regional and independent promotions including Bill Watts' Universal Wrestling Federation, World Class Championship Wrestling and the United States Wrestling Association during the late 1980s and 1990s, most notably as a frequent tag team partner of Jeff Jarrett. During the late 1990s, he was a member of "Psycho" Sid Vicious' The Psychos and, as Akeem Hassain, the USWA-faction of the Nation of Domination.

Gaylord also made a one-time appearance in the World Wrestling Federation as The Black Knight at the 1993 Survivor Series.

== Early life ==
Born in Columbus, Ohio, Gaylord played as a defensive lineman for the Missouri Tigers while attending the University of Missouri and eventually became an All-American in 1981. He later borrowed the team name for his wrestling nickname.

== Football career ==
Gaylord played high school football at Shawnee Mission South in Overland Park, Kansas before embarking on a college career at the University of Missouri. He went on to be a 4th round draft pick (88th overall) of the NFL's Los Angeles Rams in 1982. After being cut by the Rams in camp later that summer, Gaylord spent part of the 1982 season with the CFL's Toronto Argonauts playing just four games before being released.

In 1983, he was signed as a free agent by the Boston Breakers of the United States Football League (USFL) and played in 14 games during the 1983 season becoming the team's starting nose tackle. When the Breakers' franchise transferred to New Orleans in the fall of 1983, Gaylord played in 13 games with the Breakers in 1984 before being suspended for the last three games of the season. Later that fall, the Breakers relocated once again to Portland, Oregon, for the 1985 season, however Gaylord was traded to the San Antonio Gunslingers where he was a starting defensive tackle for the first seven games before ending his season on April 8. The USFL folded in the summer of 1986.

== Professional wrestling career ==
=== Universal Wrestling Federation (1985–1987) ===
Making his professional debut in 1985, he began wrestling in the Mid-South area for the Universal Wrestling Federation facing Timothy Flowers, Tarzan Goto and Kevin the Magnificent in February 1986. During the summer, he also feuded with The Russian Team facing Ivan and Nikita Koloff and Korstia Korchenko in a 6-man tag team match with Ken Massey and Perry Jackson as well as with Perry Jackson and Brett Wayne Sawyer against Korchenko and The Blade Runners on June 8. He also teamed with Ken Massey against Rick Steiner and Jack Victory at the Tulsa Convention Center in Tulsa, Oklahoma on August 17, 1987.

Facing Buddy Landell and The Angel of Death during the next few months, he later appeared on the UWF's Superdome Extravaganza supercard defeating Art Crews at The Superdome in New Orleans, Louisiana on November 27, 1986. He would later lose to One Man Gang in the opening rounds of the UWF/PWI Tournament the following month. During the next year, he would face Eli the Eliminator and, with Jeff Raitz, against Sting and Rick Steiner. He would later lose to Rick Steiner in a singles match at the Sam Houston Coliseum on January 23, 1987.

During 1989, Gaylord would also appear on WWF Wrestling Challenge teaming with Tim Horner against The Fabulous Rougeaus on April 16, before returning to World Class Championship Wrestling facing veterans such as Jimmy Jack Funk and Kerry Von Erich.

=== World Class Championship Wrestling (1988–1991) ===
Wrestling for World Class Championship Wrestling as the masked wrestler "The Hood" during the late 1980s, he would become a mainstay in the area and briefly feuded with Jeff Jarrett and Bill Dundee later teaming with "Stunning" Steve Austin, Gary Young and Skandor Akbar in an 8-man Texas Tornado match losing to Jeff Jarrett, Bill Dundee, Eric Embry and Percy Pringle in early 1990.

However, he would soon begin teaming his former rival and defeated Brian Lee and Chuck Casey for the USWA Tag Team Championship on September 3, 1990. Feuding with Brian Lee and Don Harris over the titles, they would trade the tag team titles twice with Lee and Harris before finally losing the titles to Tony Anthony and Doug Gilbert on October 6. Participating in the USWA Heavyweight Championship Tournament two days later, he defeated Doug Gilbert in the opening rounds before losing to "Dirty" Dick Slater in the semi-finals on October 8.

Defeating Matt Borne and King Cobra in January 1991, Gaylord briefly appeared in the Global Wrestling Federation. He participated in the GWF World Television Championship Tournament losing to Rasta the Voodoo Man in June 1991. During the next two months, he would team with the Blue Avenger in the GWF World Tag Team Championship Tournament being eliminated by Bill Irwin and Johnny Ace and, during the GWF North American Championship Tournament, lost to John Tatum in the opening rounds.

During this time, he was involved in an altercation with Eddie Gilbert at a Dallas wrestling event in which Gaylord allegedly "sucker-punched" Gilbert during an argument in Gilbert's dressing room at the Dallas Sportatorium. The two began fighting, until it was broken up by Doug Gilbert who assaulted Gaylord with a Coke bottle. Although Gaylord had been speaking to Gilbert regarding the possibility of being booked in Gilbert's promotion, Gilbert claimed in a later shoot interview that Gaylord was paid $1,000 by a Northeastern promoter to assault him after Gilbert had failed to show up for an event.

=== United States Wrestling Association (1991–1995) ===
Returning to the Memphis area later that year, he lost to USWA Heavyweight Champion Jerry "The King" Lawler by disqualification on November 4 and the following week, teamed with The Big O fighting to a double disqualification against Jerry Lawler and Bill Dundee on November 11. After losing to Bill Dundee and The Spirit of America on November 18, Gaylord was absent from the promotion for several weeks before returning to face Jerry Lawler, fighting him several times during an event on December 28, 1991.

Defeating The Candyman on January 6, he spent several months in the Puerto Rico-based Americas Wrestling Federation winning the AWF International Tag Team titles with Sunny Beach before returning later that year teaming with Mr. Hughes to defeat Jerry Lawler and Jeff Jarrett on September 21 and against Tony Williams and Robert Gibson on October 5. Returning to singles competition, he also defeated Tony Falk and Randy Rhodes before losing to Bill Dundee on October 26, 1992.

After he defeated Tony Williams in a rematch on November 2, he wrestled two matches in one night defeating Bart Sawyer and later teamed with USWA Southern Heavyweight Champion Brian Christopher losing to The American Eagles (Bill Dundee and Danny Davis) on November 9, 1992.

Suffering several losses to The American Eagles during the next few weeks, Gaylord teamed with Brian Christopher and The Masters of Terror (Ken Wayne and Ken Raper) in an 8-man tag-team match defeating The American Eagles, Danny Davis and Bill Dundee and later the USWA Tag Team Champions The Moondogs (Moondog Spot and Moondog Spike) by disqualification on November 30. Losing to The Moondogs in a tag team match with The Star Rider, he also lost to Tony DeNucci by disqualification on December 14.

In January 1993, he lost singles matches to Tony DeNucci, Danny Davis and Scott Campione. Although defeating Danny Davis in a rematch on February 1, he later teamed with Doink the Clown in a losing effort against USWA Heavyweight Champion Jerry Lawler and USWA Southern Heavyweight Champion Jeff Jarrett on February 8. He would appear on several house shows for the World Wrestling Federation wrestling Jerry Lawler at several house shows in early 1993.

Losing to Tom Prichard later that month, he later feuded with The Rock-N-Roll Phantom defeating him and The Nightstalker several times in April. Defeating Johnny Polo on May 10, he and Jarrett reunited to defeat Well Dunn (Timothy Well and Steven Dunn) by disqualification during the same event.

Feuding with C.W. Bergstrom during the next three months, Gaylord defeated Bergstrom in a "Strap On A Pole Match" on May 24 and again in a rematch on June 7 before losing to him on June 14. Losing to Bo Alexander and Tony Falk during the next several weeks, he was again defeated by C.W. Bergstrom on July 5, 1993.

Defeating Johnny Polo, The Hawk and Colin Scott during the summer, he later defeated Tony Falk in a rematch and, later during the event, teamed with Miss Texas and Ken Wayne in a mixed 6-man tag team match defeating PG-13 and The Black Pussycat on September 6, 1993.

Defeating Wolfie D on September 13, although suffering a loss to Colin Scott on September 20, he also defeated Leon Downs and Jim Dodson before teaming with Mike Anthony to lose to The Moondogs (Moondog Spike and Moondog Cujo) on October 18. Entering the USWA Tag Team Championship Tournament several days later, he and Anthony again lost to The Moondogs on October 25.

Defeating Paul Neighbors by disqualification, he later teamed with Mike Anthony and Del Rios in a 6-man tag team match defeating Paul Neighbors, Reggie B. Fine and Doomsday on November 8, 1993. He and Anthony would also defeat Phi Delta Slam and PG-13 several times later that month.

On November 24, he would also make a PPV appearance at the WWF's 1993 Survivor Series as "The Black Knight" along with The Red Knight and The Blue Knight against the Hart family and was later pinned by Owen Hart, becoming the first man eliminated. Although originally scheduled to be captained by Jerry Lawler, Shawn Michaels was named as a last minute replacement due to Lawler's legal problems preventing him from appearing with the WWF.

Returning to the USWA, he and Mike Anthony defeated PG-13 for the USWA Tag Team Championship on November 29 although they would lose the titles a week later to The War Machines on December 6, 1993.

Losing to Doug Gilbert on January 3, he managed to defeat Del Rios however he later lost to Skull Von Crush on January 24 and fought to a time limit draw with Reggie B. Fine on January 31.

After a loss to Koko B. Ware on February 7, he teamed with Spellbinder and King Cobra defeating Skull Von Crush and The Nightmares at the supercard Memphis Memories on March 7 and later defeated Skull Von Crush on March 14. Teaming with Robert Gibson, Gaylord lost to Well Dunn on March 21 and, defeating Ken Wayne by disqualification on March 28, he teamed with Ricky Morton and Spellbinder to defeat Ken Wayne, Skull Von Crush and Leon Downs in a 6-man tag team match later that night.

Defeating The Moondogs by disqualification in a tag team match with Don Bass on April 4, he and Spellbinder later lost to The Bad Breed (Ian Rotten and Axl Rotten) on April 11 and to The Eliminators during the USWA Tag Team Championship Tournament on April 23. Losing to Moondog Rex on May 2, he and the Spellbinder began feuding after losing to The Eliminators on June 6 and faced each other in several singles matches during the month. Defeating Bull Pain, Leon Downs and Tony Falk in early July, he won a battle royal on July 25 before losing to Sid Vicious later that night. He would later team with King Kong Bundy losing to Sid Vicious and Spike Huber on August 1, 1994.

Continuing his feud with Spellbinder as well as Spike Huber during the next several weeks, he eventually lost to Spellbinder on September 19. After being eliminated by Perry Saturn in the USWA Heavyweight Championship Tournament on October 3, he would also defeat Tony Williams before losing to Spellbinder on October 17, 1994.

Feuding with The Phantoms during late 1994, he defeated Phantom Sorrow on November 14 and, with King Cobra and Miss Texas, defeated Fantasia and The Phantoms in a mixed 6-man tag team match on November 21.

Remaining with the promotion during its last years, he lost to The Gambler by disqualification in his last appearance on May 15, 1995.

=== Late career (1994–1997) ===
After leaving the USWA, Gaylord began wrestling for the American Wrestling Federation and later teamed with The Warlord fighting to a double disqualification with Hercules Hernandez and Mr. Hughes. Gaylord also wrestled on the November 28th, 1994 taping of WCW Saturday Night, where he defeated Rip Rogers.

== Criminal convictions ==
In October 2001, Gaylord robbed a bank in Aurora, Colorado of five thousand dollars. Then, in February, he robbed the same bank branch; this time his license plate number was written down and a high-speed chase resulted, which resulted in Gaylord being taken into custody. He pleaded guilty to two counts of bank robbery and was sentenced to two consecutive terms of seventy-eight months. In 2009 he once again attempted a bank robbery in Monument, Colorado. He was released from prison for that attempt on July 15, 2015.

== Death ==
Gaylord died on March 15, 2023, at the age of 64. He was found deceased at a bus stop in Englewood, Colorado and was "likely a transient."

== Championships and accomplishments ==
- American Wrestling Federation
  - AWF International Tag Team Championship (1 time) – with Sunny Beach
- United States Wrestling Association
  - USWA World Tag Team Championship (2 times) – with Jeff Jarrett
- Pro Wrestling Illustrated
  - PWI ranked him # 83 of the 500 best singles wrestlers of the PWI 500 in 1991.
