= PMG Clash of Legends =

2007 professional wrestling pay-per-view event

- Promotion: Memphis Wrestling
- Date: April 27, 2007
- City: Memphis, Tennessee
- Venue: FedExForum
- Attendance: 2,200

The PMG Clash of Legends, Starring Hulk Hogan was an American professional wrestling pay-per-view (PPV) event (in various territories) promoted by Memphis Wrestling owner Corey Maclin in conjunction with Hulk Hogan, which took place on April 27, 2007 in the FedExForum in Memphis, Tennessee. The event attracted a degree of attention after a scheduled match between Hall of Famers Hogan and Jerry Lawler was vetoed by World Wrestling Entertainment (WWE), resulting in a lawsuit between Maclin and WWE. It was described by the Wrestling Observer as "the biggest indie undertaking in the U.S. geared toward the non-Hispanic market in many years".

== History ==
The PMG Clash of Legends had originally been scheduled to take place in the Mid-South Coliseum. However, the Mid-South Coliseum was closed in late 2005 due to failure to comply with disabled accessibility regulations. When the FedExForum was chosen as a replacement, the operators of the FedExForum contacted WWE, which had in the past held events in the FedExForum, to ensure that WWE did not object to an alternative professional wrestling promotion staging an event there. WWE did not object to the event taking place. Following the announcement that Lawler would not be allowed to wrestle at the event, WWE offered to refund Maclin's deposit on the rental of the FedExForum. He declined.

Initially, the sole match announced for the event was the titular "Clash of Legends", a bout between Hogan and Memphis Wrestling mainstay Lawler that had been promoted on the Memphis Wrestling television show Memphis Wrestling Prime Time for several months. However, on April 12, 2007, Lawler announced in a news conference that WWE had barred him from wrestling Hogan on the basis that NBC Universal employees (which includes Lawler, on the basis of co-hosting the NBC Universal-owned USA Network's WWE Raw, and his appearances on the biannual Saturday Night's Main Event) are contractually prohibited from appearing on any of the channels owned by MTV Networks, which includes VH1, the channel on which Hogan Knows Best, a reality television series starring Hogan, airs.

Following the cancellation of the Hogan-Lawler match, Memphis Wrestling owner Corey Maclin announced that Hogan would instead wrestle Paul Wight in Wight's first match since leaving WWE in December 2006. When referred to by the ring name he used in WWE, "The Big Show", Wight stated that this was his "slave name" and that he was to be referred to as "'The Great' Paul Wight".

In response to Maclin's announcement, WWE immediately banned all WWE employees from appearing at Memphis Wrestling events, with the result that The Boogeyman, Charlie Haas and Shelton Benjamin were all obliged to cancel their scheduled appearances at the April 13, 2007 Memphis Wrestling show in Tunica, Mississippi. Robert Gibson was to team with his longtime Rock 'n' Roll Express partner Ricky Morton to face Too Cool II, however WWE pulled Gibson from the event as well, as he was a WWE producer. Gibson would be replaced by Kid Kash, and Bobby Eaton filled Kash's original spot as Koko B. Ware's tag team partner against Bill Dundee and Dutch Mantel.

The event was hosted by Maclin and Lance Russell, and mayor of Memphis W. W. Herenton served as timekeeper. Colin Bowman was brought in at the last minute as the Show Director.

On May 5, 2007, it was revealed that 2,200 fans attended the event, yielding a $104,500 gate.

In January 2008, Maclin filed a claim for punitive damages against WWE and WWE Chairman Vince McMahon in the Shelby County circuit court, alleging that WWE and McMahon had breached section two of the Sherman Antitrust Act.

== Results ==
No.	Results	Stipulations	Times
1	Moondog Cujo (with Sal Corrente) defeated The Barbarian	Singles match	—
2	Greg Valentine defeated Mr. Hughes	Singles match	—
3	Jazz defeated Christi Ricci and Miss Passion	Three Way match	—
4	Abdullah the Butcher vs. Al Green ended in a no contest	Singles match	—
5	Bill Dundee and Dutch Mantel (with Jimmy Valiant) defeated The First Family (Koko B. Ware and Bobby Eaton) (with Slick)	Tag team match	—
6	Brutus Beefcake and Bubba the Love Sponge defeated The New Assassins (Dave Golden and Billy Ray Hickerson) (with Sal Corrente)	Tag team match	—
7	Brian Christopher defeated Buff Bagwell	Singles match	—
8	Ricky Morton and Kid Kash defeated Too Cool 2 (Tim Grind and Flex) (c)	Tag team match for the Memphis Wrestling Southern Tag Team Championship	—
9	Hulk Hogan defeated Paul Wight	Singles match	12:15
(c) / – the champion(s) heading into the match
