= Moondogs (professional wrestling) =

Professional wrestling stable

Stable
- Members: see below
- Billed from: Parts Unknown
- Debut: 1980

The Moondogs were a professional wrestling stable in the World Wrestling Federation (WWF) and in the Memphis promotions: the Continental Wrestling Association (CWA), which became the United States Wrestling Association (USWA). They were known for wrestling in frayed blue jeans, sporting shaggy blond hair and beards and carrying animal bones around with them (which they chewed and used as weapons).

== Origins ==
The name "moondog" seems to have originated with American musician Louis T. Hardin (1916–1999) who used the nickname from the 1940s. His instrumental song "Moondog Serenade" inspired DJ Alan Freed to use the Moondog moniker in the 1950s until legal action from Hardin resulted in a judgement in Hardin's favor. Hardin used this name for a 1969 album called Moondog

The Moondog gimmick in wrestling was born in 1973 when Lonnie Mayne became Moondog Mayne in the World Wide Wrestling Federation. He continued using the gimmick in Portland, Texas, California and Georgia. He died in 1978 after an automobile accident.

=== World Wrestling Federation (1980–1987) ===
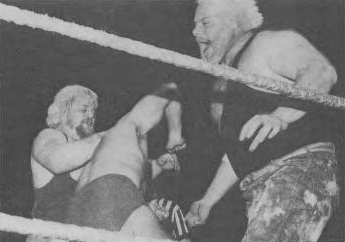
Moondog King (left) and Moondog Rex (right) double team Rick Martel (center), c. 1981

In 1980, Moondog Hawkins wrestled in the WWF, in which the gimmick was short-lived. Hawkins became Moondog Rex.

Moondog Rex and Moondog King joined the World Wrestling Federation (WWF) in October 1980, where they defeated Rick Martel and Tony Garea for the WWF Tag Team Championship. After winning the title, Moondog King was replaced by Moondog Spot after King—a Canadian—was denied entry into the United States in 1981. Rex and Spot's gimmick consisted of them carrying chewed up bones to the ring and wearing cut-off blue jeans. While in the WWF, the Moondogs feuded with Tony Garea, Rick Martel, Bob Backlund, Ivan Putski, Pat Patterson, and the Wild Samoans.

In 1984, on an episode of Maple Leaf Wrestling, Moondog Rex earned a WWF Championship title shot against Hulk Hogan. In 1987, Rex was repackaged as Smash of Demolition, along with Ax. However, fans easily recognized him and gave him chants of "Moondog," leading to him being quickly replaced by Barry Darsow. Rex and Spot then teamed together until 1990 in various promotions.

=== Continental Wrestling Association/United States Wrestling Association and Smoky Mountain Wrestling (1983–1996) ===
The Moondogs had two runs in Memphis. Their first run took place in the Continental Wrestling Association in 1983, where they were managed by Jimmy Hart and feuded with The Fabulous Ones. They captured the AWA Southern Tag Team Championship from the Fabs on April 4, 1983, and lost it back to them on April 25, in a no-disqualification match. The feud continued throughout 1983 and ended when The Moondogs lost a leaves town match to the Fabs on January 16, 1984.

In October 1987, the Moondogs wrestled for All Japan Pro Wrestling. Moondog Spike and Moondog Spot faced opponents such as Jumbo Tsuruta, Mighty Inoue, Haruka Eigen and Tiger Mask II.

In late 1991, The Moondogs returned, this time managed by Richard Lee. Spot and Spike captured the USWA Tag Team Championship on November 30, 1991. In early 1992, The Moondogs gained a new ally in The Big Black Dog, whom they would later feud with. Moondog Cujo was added to the group in April 1992, teaming with both Spot and Spike separately. The New Moondogs of Spot and Cujo recaptured USWA Tag Team Championship and traded the title with Jeff Jarrett and Jerry Lawler throughout 1992. During October 1992, The Moondogs gained another ally in Moondog Fifi, who won the USWA Women's Championship from Miss Texas. The feud between Jarrett/Lawler and The Moondogs was voted the 1992 PWI Feud of the Year by Pro Wrestling Illustrated. Cujo left the group during September 1992.

On December 28, The Moondogs lost the title to The Harris Brothers, managed by Bert Prentice and Mike Samples. The teams traded the belts back and forth until the Moondogs captured them for the last time on February 22, 1993. The feud ended in March 1993, when The Harris Brothers beat The Moondogs in a manager's hair vs hair match with Samples' hair vs Lee's hair on the line. On January 30, 1993, the Moondogs gained another ally in Moondog Splat, who replaced Spike.

On March 8, 1993, Brian Christopher teamed with The Big Black Dog to defeat The Moondogs for the tag team title. The Moondogs won it back the next week. Moondog Cujo and Spike replaced Spot and Splat in July 1993. August 1993 saw the Moondogs meet one of their noteworthy rivals, The Dogcatchers, which played off of the Moondogs' name. The teams feuded throughout August and September 1993.

From November 1993 to March 1994, the team appeared in Smoky Mountain Wrestling, feuding again with The Harris Brothers and The Rock 'n' Roll Express. Spike and Splat also appeared in W*ING's 1993 Most Dangerous Tag War Tournament, finishing with 0 points.

1994 saw the team change again with Spot and a new Moondog Rex taking up the Moondog name until Moondog Rover replaced Rex in 1996, before the team disbanded.

=== Independent circuit ===
In the latter part of 2003, the Moondogs (Spot and Puppy Love) began working in Memphis Wrestling, with April Pennington acting as their manager. On November 29, 2003, Moondog Spot died in the ring during a battle royal in Memphis.

Moondog Cujo appeared at the Clash of the Legends show in Memphis on April 29, 2007, where he defeated The Barbarian.

== Members ==
=== Core ===
- Moondog King (Edward White) - From October 1980 to July 1981
- Moondog Rex (Randy Colley) - From October 1980 to December 1986
- Moondog Spot (Larry Booker) - From July 1981 to September 1996, June 2003 to November 2003
- Moondog Spike (William Smithson) - October 1987 and from December 1991 to January 1993
- Moondog Cujo (Lanny Kean) - From April 1992 to October 1993

=== Others ===
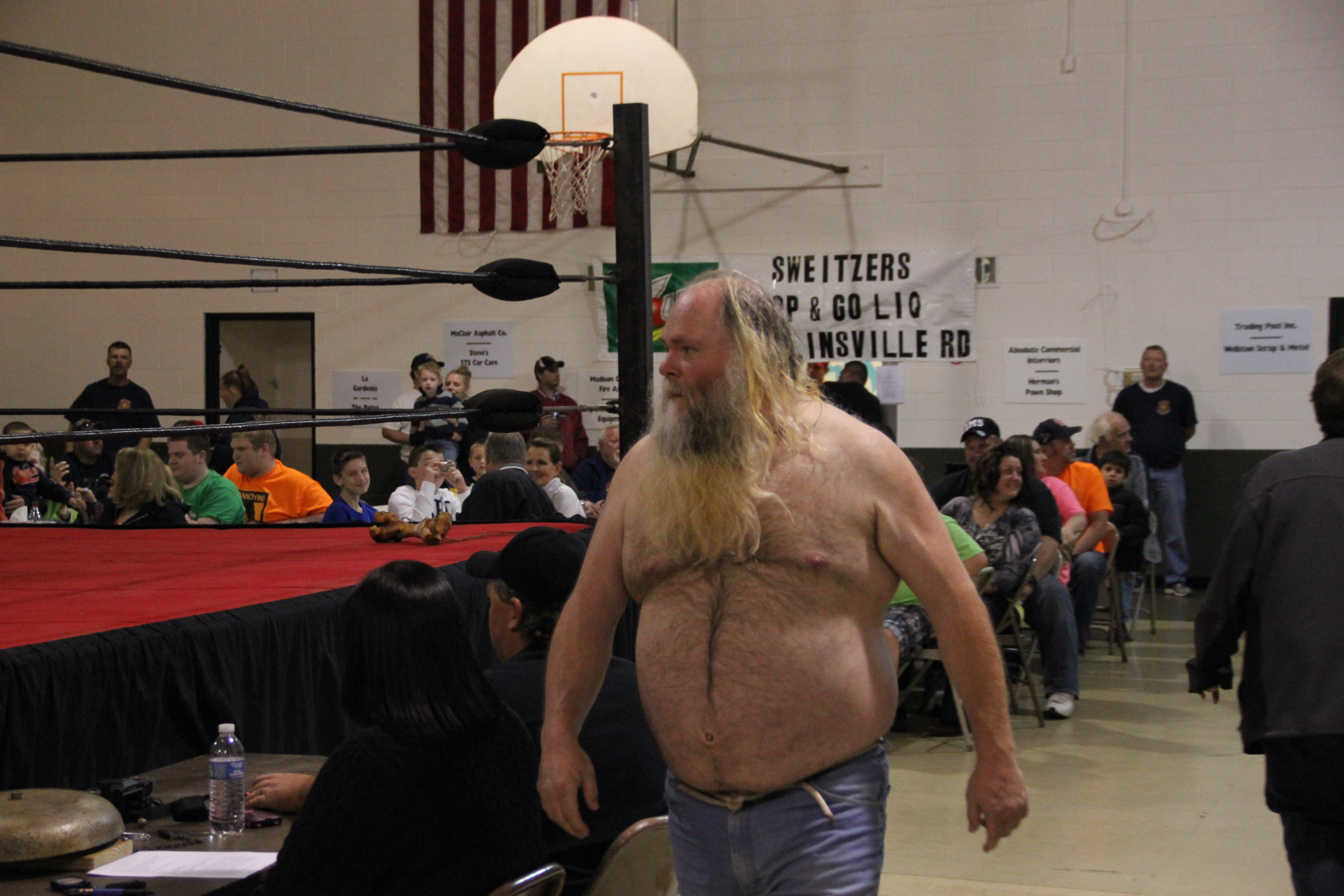
Moondog Rover in 2013

- Moondog Baron (DJ Baron)
- Moondog Buddy (Sean Taylor)
- Moondog Bernard (Casey Bernauer)
- Moondog Chopps (Unknown)
- Moondog Davis (Chris Dillon)
- Moondog Duke (Frank Cody)
- Moondog Fido (Buddy Donovan)
- Moondog Fifi (Diane Von Hoffman)
- Moondog Grizzly (Ted Grizzly)
- Moondog Hammer (David Hammer)
- Moondog Mange (Jimmy Stone)
- Moondog Manson (Murray Cairns)
- Moondog Max (John Walton)
- Moondog Mayne (Lonnie Mayne)
- Moondog Molsonn (Jak Molsonn)
- Moondog Moretti (Ed Moretti)
- Moondog Mort (Joel Goltry)
- Moondog Nathan (Nathan Randolph)
- Moondog Pongo (Charles Richards)
- Moondog Puppy Love (Mike Flowers)
- Moondog Ravage (Brad Worell)
- Moondog Rex (Nathan Brian Randolph)
- Moondog Rover (Paul J. Mcknight)
- Moondog Runt (James McClain)
- Moondog Spike (William Wantland)
- Moondog Splash (Charles Edward Harrell)
- Moondog Splat (Robert White)
- Moondog Spot (Tony Nardo)
- Moondog Super (Peter Beshai)
- Moondog Wenzel (Bryan Wenzel)
- Moondog X (Brian Jellison)

== Championships and accomplishments ==
- Central States Wrestling
  - NWA Central States Tag Team Championship (1 time) - Moretti and Bobby Jaggers
- Continental Championship Wrestling
  - NWA Alabama Heavyweight Championship (1 time) - Spot
- Continental Wrestling Association
  - AWA Southern Tag Team Championship (1 time) – Rex and Spot
- Big Time Wrestling
  - NWA United States Heavyweight Championship (San Francisco version) (2 times) - Mayne
  - NWA World Tag Team Championship (San Francisco version) (3 times) - Mayne and Pat Patterson (1), Mayne and Ray Stevens, Mayne and Dean Ho (1)
- Dyersburg Championship Wrestling
  - DCW Tag Team Championship (1 time)
- Elite Canadian Championship Wrestling
  - ECCW Championship (1 time) - Manson
  - ECCW Hardcore Championship (15 times) - Manson
  - ECCW Tag Team Championship (2 times) - Manson and Chopps
- Georgia Championship Wrestling
  - NWA Columbus Tag Team Championship (1 time) - Mayne and Luke Graham
  - NWA Macon Tag Team Championship (time) - Mayne and Graham
- Hollywood Wrestling
  - NWA Americas Tag Team Championship (1 time) - Mayne and Ron Bass
- International Championship Wrestling (New England)
  - IWCCW Tag Team Championship (2 times) – Spike and Spot (1), Spike and Dungeon Master (1)
- Jersey Championship Wrestling
  - JCW Tag Team Championship (1 time) - Molsonn and Wenzel
- Memphis Wrestling Hall of Fame
  - Class of 2022 - (Spot, Rex, Cujo and Spike)
- New Generation Wrestling
  - NGW Tag Team Championship (2 times) - Max and Ryan Bean
- New World Wrestling
  - NWW Tag Team Championship (1 time) - Max and Kohuko
- NWA All-Star Wrestling
  - NWA Canadian Heavyweight Championship (Vancouver version) (1 time) - Moretti and Terry Adonis
- NWA Mid-South
  - NWA Mid-South Tag Team Championship (1 time) - Rover and Tim White
- Ozark Mountain Wrestling
  - OMW Tag Team Championship (1 time)
- Power Pro Wrestling
  - PPW Tag Team Championship (1 time) - Spot and Derrick King
- Pro Wrestling Illustrated
  - PWI Feud of the Year (1992) vs. Jerry Lawler and Jeff Jarrett
- UFO Wrestling
  - UFO Tag Team Championship (1 time) - Max and Bidondi
- Ultimate Wrestling Dynasty
  - UWD Hardcore Championship (2 times) - Max
- United States Wrestling Association
  - USWA World Tag Team Championship (14 times) – Splat and Spot (4), Spike and Spot (3), Rex and Spot (3), Cujo and Spike (2), Cujo and Spot (1) and Rover and Spot (1)
  - USWA Women's Championship (1 time) – Fifi
- West Coast Championship Wrestling
  - WCCW Heavyweight Championship (2 times) - Moretti
- World Wrestling Council
  - WWC Caribbean Tag Team Championship (1 time) – Rex and Spot
  - WWC North American Tag Team Championship (2 times) – Rex and Spot
  - WWC World Tag Team Championship (1 time) – Rex and Spot
- World Wrestling Federation
  - WWF Tag Team Championship (1 time) – Rex, King & Spot (who replaced King during title reign)
- Wrestling Observer Newsletter
  - Feud of the Year (1992) vs. Jerry Lawler and Jeff Jarrett
