= Moondog Spot =

American professional wrestler (1952–2003)

Personal information
- Born: Larry Wayne Booker; June 6, 1952 Louisiana, U.S.
- Died: November 29, 2003 (aged 51) Memphis, Tennessee, U.S.
- Cause of death: Heart attack

Professional wrestling career
- Ring name(s): Larry Latham; Moondog Spot
- Billed height: 6 ft 0 in (183 cm)
- Billed weight: 375 lb (170 kg)
- Billed from: "Parts unknown"
- Trained by: Herb Welch
- Debut: 1977

Larry Wayne Booker (June 6, 1952 – November 29, 2003), better known by his ring names Moondog Spot and Larry Latham, was an American professional wrestler.

== Professional wrestling career ==
=== Early career (1977–1981) ===
Booker debuted in 1977 under the ring name Larry Latham. Latham formed a tag team with Carl Fergie called "The Ragin' Cajuns" managed by Billy Spears in the Gulf Coast territory. Early in his career, he wrestled in Memphis and Mid-South, and his first big push came as a member of the Blond Bombers with Wayne Farris (The Honky Tonk Man). The Blond Bombers were involved in heated feuds with several babyfaces across the two competing Tennessee promotions, appearing in both Nick Gulas' Nashville based territory, and Jerry Jarrett's Memphis area. The team was managed by Danny Davis. Their signature moment was the "Tupelo Concession Stand Brawl" against Jerry Lawler and Bill Dundee, which occurred on June 15, 1979 and won Pro Wrestling Illustrated's Feud of the Year in 1992. This served as a precursor to the "hardcore" style that was popularized by Extreme Championship Wrestling in the mid-1990s.

=== World Wrestling Federation and Memphis (1981–1987) ===
Years later, Booker resurfaced as "Moondog Spot", a member of The Moondogs, whose name was suggested by Vincent J. McMahon. Booker became a WWWF World Tag Team Champion as a replacement for Moondog King in May 1981. Booker held the title along with Moondog Rex until they were defeated by Rick Martel and Tony Garea on July 21, 1981. The Moondogs also frequently appeared in Memphis where they feuded with The Fabulous Ones, The Rock 'n' Roll Express, and Midnight Express. With scraggly hair and beards, Spot and Rex wore tattered blue jeans and simple black boots to the ring, carrying their trademark oversized, dinosaur-looking bones, which were often used as foreign objects when needed.

The Moondogs became a regular gimmick in the Memphis promotion featuring a revolving door of wrestlers who teamed with Latham. In 1984, Booker and Rex returned to the WWF with Jimmy Hart as their manager. The next year, they split up and Rex became the original Smash in Demolition before being replaced by Barry Darsow. On November 7, 1985, he wrestled in the tournament on the WWF pay-per-view event Wrestling Classic, defeating Terry Funk in the first round by count out, but losing to Junkyard Dog in the quarterfinals. After the tournament, Spot was relegated to jobber status until leaving the company in 1987.

=== Later career (1987–2003) ===
After leaving the WWF, he went to All Japan Pro Wrestling where he teamed with Moondog Spike for a few months in late 1987. Spot kept up The Moondogs gimmick. For most of his career, he stayed in Memphis working for the United States Wrestling Association from 1991 to 1996, where he won the USWA Southern Tag Team titles with Spike, Cujo and Splat. He also worked in Smoky Mountain Wrestling from 1993 to 1994. He would stick around Tennessee for the independent circuit mainly working for Power Pro Wrestling. Latham later operated a wrestling school in Osceola, Arkansas. During his few appearances in the independent circuit, he would usually team up with Moondog Puppy Love, working in Memphis Wrestling, with April Pennington acting as their manager. In March 2003, he made an appearance as Moondog Spot in Total Nonstop Action Wrestling, where he teamed with Jim Duggan to defeat Mike Sanders and Disco Inferno.

== Death ==
On November 29, 2003, Booker suffered a heart attack in the ring during Jerry Lawler's "birthday bash" show in Memphis, Tennessee. He was rushed to Methodist Central Hospital where he was pronounced dead at the age of 51. A coroner attributed his death to complications from diabetes and other medical ailments. Following the show, the crowd was informed of his death, a ten-bell salute was performed, and Brian Christopher asked the fans to pray for Booker's family, who had been in attendance. Booker was buried at the Zion Hill Church Cemetery in Friendship, Tennessee; Lawler attended his funeral.

== Championships and accomplishments ==
- International Championship Wrestling (New England)
  - ICW Tag Team Championship (1 time) – with Moondog Spike
- Memphis Wrestling Hall of Fame
  - Class of 2022 - with The Moondogs
- Moondog Championship Wrestling
  - MCW Heavyweight Championship (1 time)
- NWA Mid-America - Continental Wrestling Association
  - AWA Southern Tag Team Championship (5 times) – with Wayne Farris (3), Bill Irwin (1) and Moondog Rex (1)
  - NWA Mid-America Tag Team Championship (3 times) – with Wayne Farris
  - CWA Heavyweight Championship (3 times)
  - NWA Alabama Heavyweight Championship (1 times)
- Power Pro Wrestling
  - PPW Tag Team Championship (1 time) – with Derrick King
- Pro Wrestling Illustrated
  - PWI Feud of the Year (1992) with Moondog Cujo vs. Jerry Lawler and Jeff Jarrett
- Southern Championship Wrestling
  - SCW Heavyweight Championship (1 time)
- United States Wrestling Association
  - USWA World Tag Team Championship (13 times) – with Moondog Spike (3), Moondog Cujo (2), Moondog Splat (4), Moondog Rex (3), and Moondog Rover (1)
- World Wrestling Council
  - WWC North American Tag Team Championship (1 time) – with Moondog Rex
  - WWC Caribbean Tag Team Championship (2 times) – with Moondog Rex
  - WWC World Tag Team Championship (1 time) – with Moondog Rex
- World Wrestling Federation
  - WWF Tag Team Championship (1 time) – with Moondog Rex
- Wrestling Observer Newsletter
  - Feud of the Year (1992) with Moondog Cujo vs. Jerry Lawler and Jeff Jarrett
