= Moondog Rex =

American professional wrestler (1950–2019)

- Moondog Rex, c. 1981

Personal information
- Born: Randy Adrian Colley; May 2, 1950 Alexander City, Alabama, U.S.
- Died: December 14, 2019 (aged 69) Alexander City, Alabama, U.S.

Professional wrestling career
- Ring names: Assassin #1; Assassin #2; Detroit Demolition; Deadeye Dick; Dr. X; Moondog Hawkins; Moondog Rex; The Nightmare; Randy Collins; Randy Jones; Randy the Mountaineer; Ripper Hawkins; Shadow #1; Smash
- Billed height: 6 ft 4 in (193 cm)
- Billed weight: 288 lb (131 kg)
- Billed from: "Parts unknown"
- Trained by: Al Velasco
- Debut: September 21, 1970
- Retired: 1997

Randy Adrian Colley (May 2, 1950 – December 14, 2019) was an American professional wrestler, better known by the ring name Moondog Rex. He was best known for his appearances in the World Wrestling Federation as a part of The Moondogs. Colley was also one of the original members of the tag team Demolition, preceding Barry Darsow as Smash.

== Professional wrestling career ==
=== Early career (1970–1980) ===
Colley began his career in the 1970s as Jack Dalton in a tag team with Jim Dalton, collectively known as the Dalton Brothers. The two would compete in the National Wrestling Alliance (NWA) in their Florida, Gulf Coast and Georgia territories. In 1976, he joined Mid-Atlantic Championship Wrestling (MACW) under his real name, facing opponents such as Steve Strong, Two Ton Harris, and Larry Sharpe.

=== World Wrestling Federation (1980–1981) ===
Colley joined the World Wrestling Federation (WWF) in 1980, debuting under the name "Ripper Hawkins". Shortly after, he was repackaged as "Moondog Hawkins", and later "Moondog Rex" as promoter Vince McMahon Sr. noted Colley's resemblance to Moondog Mayne. He was paired with Moondog King as "The Moondogs", winning the WWF Tag Team Championship from Rick Martel and Tony Garea in March 1981, which they held for four months; Moondog Spot eventually replaced King as Rex's partner during their reign due to King being denied entry to the United States at the Canada–United States border. The WWF claimed that in storyline, King was injured after being hit by a car.

=== Georgia Championship Wrestling (1982–1983) ===
He next appeared in Georgia Championship Wrestling (GCW) with Spot. The Moondogs made their debut on October 25, 1982, in a match at the Omni against Brad Armstrong and Tito Santana. The Moondogs would continue with the promotion for the next three months, wrestling The Wild Samoans and various combinations that included Stan Hansen.

=== Continental Wrestling Association (1983–1984) ===
Both Moondogs then moved to the Continental Wrestling Association (CWA), where they were embroiled in a feud with The Fabulous Ones (Stan Lane and Steve Keirn) after ripping up their jackets, which were given to them by Jackie Fargo. On April 4, 1983, in the Mid-South Coliseum, the Moondogs defeated the Fabulous Ones to win the Southern Tag Team Championship, before losing them in a rematch three weeks later. Their feud pioneered hardcore wrestling and intensified when Fargo took Keirn's place after the Moondogs injured him.

=== Return to the World Wrestling Federation (1984–1985) ===
The Moondogs returned to the World Wrestling Federation in 1984, during the midst of its national expansion. In June, Colley faced Hulk Hogan twice for the WWF World Championship, but failed to win the title. For the next few months, they were programmed into a house show series against the newly-arrived Fabulous Freebirds (Michael Hayes, Terry Gordy and Buddy Roberts) and later the Brisco Brothers (Jerry and Jack). The Moondogs entered 1985 on the lower end of the tag team ranks, and were split apart as singles wrestlers to help flesh out house show cards. Colley lost to established names like Bret Hart, Barry Windham, Jimmy Snuka and Tony Atlas, but was able to defeat preliminary talent such as Rick McGraw.

=== Mid South Wrestling (1985) ===
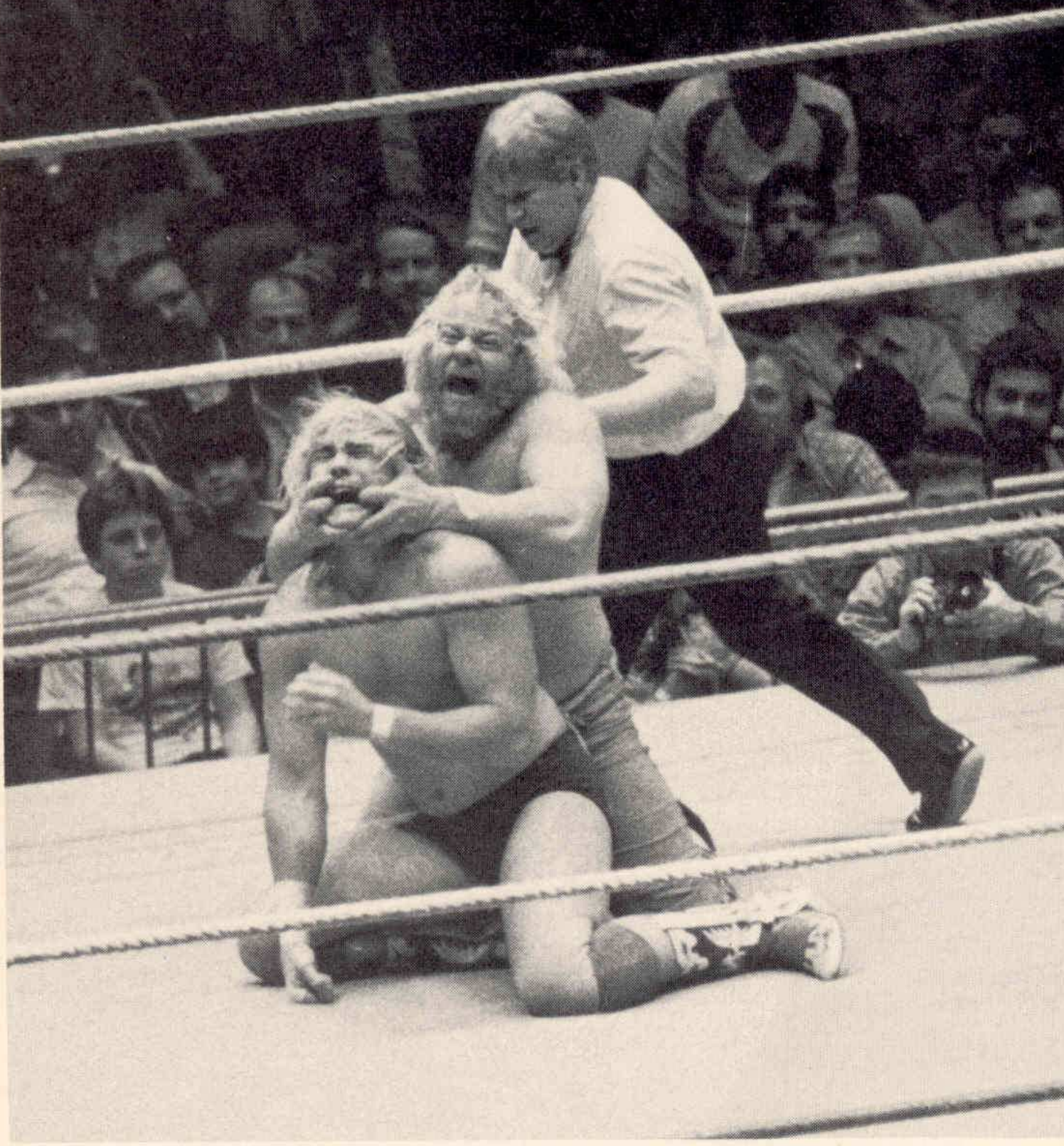
Moondog Rex (back) facing Barry Windham (front)

Following his WWF departure, Colley made his debut for Bill Watts' Mid South Wrestling Federation (UWF) as The Nightmare and was given a substantial push under the guidance of Eddie Gilbert. On May 22, 1985, he defeated Terry Taylor to capture the Mid-South North American Championship. After rebranding as The Champion, he lost the title to Dick Murdoch on August 10. Colley also held the Mid-South Tag Team Championship with Gilbert for a month in November.

=== Second return to the World Wrestling Federation (1986–1987, 1988) ===
Colley made his return to the WWF in February 1986 and also toured with New Japan Pro-Wrestling (NJPW) in April. Again paired with Spot, they suffered losses to established teams including The Rougeau Brothers (Jacques and Raymond) on Prime Time Wrestling, Tony Atlas and Pedro Morales, the U.S. Express (Barry Windham and Mike Rotunda) and WWF World Champion Hulk Hogan and Paul Orndorff on WWF Championship Wrestling.

On January 4, 1987, Colley was repackaged as "Smash" in the new tag team of Demolition, facing and defeating the Islanders. The following day, he made his televised debut at a WWF Superstars taping. Despite having his hair trimmed, his beard shaved off, and wearing face paint, fans almost immediately recognized him and began chanting "Moondog" when he entered the ring. As a result, he was replaced with Barry Darsow.

From April until his departure by the end of October 1987, Colley was repackaged again as part of the masked wrestling team The Shadows with Jose Luis Rivera, but they were primarily used as enhancement talent. Colley made a one-off return on November 26, 1988, wrestling as "The Shadow" in a loss to Boris Zukhov.

In 1994, Colley was called as a prosecution witness at the Vince McMahon steroid distribution trial in Long Island, New York.

=== Continental Championship Wrestling (1988–1989) ===
After a stint with Stampede Wrestling under his real name, Colley worked for Continental Championship Wrestling (CCW) alongside Eddie Gilbert as "Detroit Demolition". Managed by Downtown Bruno, he teamed with Lord Humungous until Humungous turned face and allied with (kayfabe) childhood friend Shane Douglas against Bruno and his men.

=== World Championship Wrestling (1990–1991) ===
In the summer of 1990, Colley began working for World Championship Wrestling (WCW) as Moondog Rex in singles competition. Colley's highest profile match was a loss to Junkyard Dog on October 27 at Halloween Havoc. He continued to appear on televised programs and house shows into the spring of 1991. In May, World Championship Wrestling (WCW) created a stable known as "the Desperados", consisting of Dutch Mantell, Black Bart and Colley, who played "Deadeye Dick". The Desperados were portrayed as three bumbling cowboys hoping for Stan Hansen to join WCW and team with them, being promoted through a series of vignettes in which they were beaten up in saloons, searched ghost towns, were jailed and rode horses. However, this storyline was short-lived as Hansen wanted no part of it and left for Japan.

After leaving WCW, Colley would take a hiatus form wrestling for a couple of years. He briefly reunited with Demolition Ax (Bill Eadie) and his "New Demolition" partner Blast (Carmine Azzato) on the independent circuit before the WWF sent Eadie a cease and desist letter.

=== Smoky Mountain Wrestling (1993–1994) ===
From November 1993 to March 1994, Colley reunited with Spot as the Moondogs in Smoky Mountain Wrestling (SMW), engaging in feuds with The Rock 'n' Roll Express and The Bruise Brothers while splitting their time between SMW and the United States Wrestling Association (USWA).

=== United States Wrestling Association (1994–1996) ===
The Moondogs joined the USWA full time in March 1994 and began a feud with Jerry Lawler and Brian Christopher, quickly winning the USWA World Tag Team Championship from Billy Joe Travis and The Spellbinder. They would lose the titles later that year, but regained them on October 24 against The Phantoms. In November they lost and then regained the titles from The Bruise Brothers.

The Moondogs entered 1995 having lost the USWA titles once more and entered a tournament to crown new champions; they wrestled The Rock 'n' Roll Express to a no-contest in the finals at the Mid South Coliseum on January 9, 1995. That spring they would feud with Crusher Bones, Jack Hammer, and Big Daddy Cyrus. Their run in the company ended that year with a match at the USWA's Mid South Memphis Memories II card, where they were defeated by The Fabulous Ones.

In 1996 the duo returned once more, defeating Jimmy Harris and Ron Harris at the Mid South Coliseum on January 2. In April 1996 they began to feud with former WWF Tag Team Champions Men on a Mission, the latter on loan from the WWF. On April 22, 1996, the Moondogs defeated Men on a Mission via pinfall at the Mid South Coliseum. In June the Moondogs were booked into a tournament to crown the USWA's Southern Tag Team Champions, but were defeated by Brickhouse Brown and Reggie B. Fine in the first round. In the summer, the Moondogs regained the USWA Tag Team Championship for a final time. The Moondogs left USWA that fall, a year before the promotion closed its doors.

== Later years and death ==
Colley retired from wrestling in 1997 to operate a bail-bond company with fellow wrestler David Schultz. He later worked as an electrician, remodelled houses and became an ordained minister. He also owned several gyms in his hometown of Alexander City. Jerry Lawler asked Colley to appear at his "birthday bash" show in Memphis on November 29, 2003, but he did not appear due to undergoing heart surgery; at the same show, his former partner Moondog Spot died of a heart attack.

On December 14, 2019, Colley died at the age of 69, a week after undergoing amputation of his right leg above the knee.

== Championships and accomplishments ==
- Continental Wrestling Association

- AWA Southern Tag Team Championship (1 time) – with Moondog Spot

- Georgia Championship Wrestling

- NWA Georgia Tag Team Championship (2 times) – with Assassin #1

- Gulf Coast Championship Wrestling – Southeastern Championship Wrestling

- NWA Gulf Coast Tag Team Championship (1 time) – with Jim Dalton
- NWA Southeastern Continental Tag Team Championship (1 time) – with D.I. Bob Carter

- Hardcore Championship Wrestling
  - HCW Tag Team Championship (1 time) – with Steve Morton
- Memphis Wrestling Hall of Fame
  - Class of 2022 - with The Moondogs
- Mid-South Wrestling Association

- Mid-South North American Heavyweight Championship (1 time)
- Mid-South Tag Team Championship (1 time) – with Eddie Gilbert

- United States Wrestling Association

- USWA World Tag Team Championship (3 times) – with Moondog Spot

- World Wrestling Council

- WWC North American Tag Team Championship (2 times) – with Moondog Spot
- WWC World Tag Team Championship (1 time) – with Moondog Spot
- WWC Caribbean Tag Team Championship (2 times) – with Moondog Spot

- World Wrestling Federation

- WWF Tag Team Championship (1 time) – with Moondog King and replacement partner Moondog Spot
