= Doug Gilbert =

American professional wrestler (born 1969)

Personal information
- Born: Douglas Gilbert; February 5, 1969 (age 57) Lexington, Tennessee, U.S.
- Family: Tommy Gilbert (father); Eddie Gilbert (brother)

Professional wrestling career
- Ring name(s): The Dark Patriot; Doug Gilbert; The Enforcer; Dangerous Doug Gilbert; Jason; Freddie Krueger; Nightmare Freddie; The Terrorist; Wrestling Machine #1
- Billed height: 6 ft 0 in (1.83 m)
- Billed weight: 240 lb (110 kg)
- Trained by: Tommy Gilbert
- Debut: 1986

Douglas Gilbert (born February 5, 1969) is an American professional wrestler. He is best known for his appearances with regional professional wrestling promotions throughout the Southern United States, as well as for Extreme Championship Wrestling and overseas in Japan.

== Professional wrestling career ==
=== Early career (1986–1991) ===
Doug Gilbert debuted for Continental Wrestling Association in 1986 at the age of seventeen. In 1987, he wrestled for Jim Crockett Promotions as the masked Enforcer. In 1988, Gilbert went to Continental Wrestling Federation, under a masked alter-ego Nightmare Freddie, siding with Nightmare Ken Wayne in his rivalry with Nightmare Danny Davis. In March 1989, he wrestled for World Championship Wrestling, where he remained until October. In December 1989, Gilbert won his first championship, the ICW Tag Team Championship with Dennis Condrey. By March 1990, Gilbert left ICW and the Tag Team titles were vacant.

=== Peak years (1991–1996) ===
Upon his return to Memphis, Gilbert won two USWA World Tag Team Championships with Tony Anthony, before leaving for Dallas in 1992 to join the Global Wrestling Federation. While in the GWF, he donned a mask and went under the name The Dark Patriot an evil version of GWF's top star The Patriot and was managed by Bruce Prichard, and he won the GWF North American Heavyweight Championship in January 1992.

In September 1992, Gilbert began touring Japan for Wrestling International New Generations, where he went under the Freddy Krueger alter-ego. By 1993, he returned to the USWA, splitting his time between USWA and W*ING. In August 1993, he won the W*ING World Tag Team Championship with Leatherface. He'd also wrestled matches for Eastern Championship Wrestling as The Dark Patriot, winning the ECW World Tag Team Championship with his brother Eddie. After his brother had a falling-out with Tod Gordon, Gilbert left ECW. After quitting W*ING after shooting on the promotion, Gilbert returned to the USWA as The Dark Patriot and feuded with Brian Christopher, and after losing a match to Brian Christopher by disqualification, Christopher unmasked him revealing his identity. He then wrestled Christopher for the USWA Southern Heavyweight Championship, which was traded between the two several times between February 1994 and May 1995.

In August 1994, he returned to Japan for International Wrestling Association of Japan, again under the Freddy Krueger persona. Two months later, he revived the Dark Patriot persona in IWA Japan. In the USWA, he began teaming with Tommy Rich, with whom he held four USWA World Tag Team titles with within over a year, feuding with PG-13. In January 1996, Gilbert won a USWA battle royal to earn himself a spot in the World Wrestling Federation's 1996 Royal Rumble match later that month. He entered at #14, and was eliminated by Vader. He won the USWA battle royal under his Nightmare Freddy gimmick but due to trademark law had to enter the Rumble under his own name.

=== Later career (1996–present) ===
By 1996, Gilbert expanded beyond USWA. While he was also wrestling for USWA, WCW, and the NWA, he began wrestling for other promotions within the area including IWA Mid-South (where he won their Heavyweight Championship in April 1997), North American All-Star Wrestling, Europe's Catch Wrestling Association, and Ohio Valley Wrestling. In 1998, he won the IWA World Heavyweight Championship in Tokyo, Japan and two NWA National Heavyweight Championships. The following year, he worked for a Memphis-based promotion, Power Pro Wrestling, now doubling as an WWF developmental territory, where he feuded again with Brian Christopher, but was fired after a televised promo which turned into a shoot on Christopher, Jerry Lawler (Christopher's real-life father), and Power Pro booker Randy Hales. In the shoot that took place in October 1999, Gilbert revealed to the audience that Lawler was Christopher's father (something that was forbidden to mention on TV), accused Hales of smoking crack, and accused Lawler of raping a 13-year-old girl; a reference to claims made against Lawler in 1993 that were dismissed. Gilbert was fired from the promotion immediately. In 2000, Gilbert won the NWA Mississippi Heavyweight Championship; he would not win another title again until he defeated Bam Bam Bundy for the USA Championship Wrestling's USA Heavyweight Championship in Jackson, Tennessee in 2018.

On August 14, 2021 Gilbert as Nightmare Freddie teamed with Danny Demanto in a losing effort against Neil Diamond Cutter & Satu Jinn at ICW No Holds Barred in San Antonio, Texas.

== Championships and accomplishments ==
- Academie De Lutte Estrienne
  - ALE Sherbrooke Championship (1 time, current)
- Cauliflower Alley Club
  - Family Award (2011) – with Eddie Gilbert and Tommy Gilbert
- Eastern Championship Wrestling
  - ECW Tag Team Championship (1 time) – with Eddie Gilbert
  - ECW Tag Team Championship Tournament (1993) – with Eddie Gilbert
- Global Wrestling Federation
  - GWF North American Heavyweight Championship (1 time)
- International Championship Wrestling (New England)
  - ICW Tag Team Championship (1 time) – with Dennis Condrey
- International Wrestling Association of Japan
  - IWA World Heavyweight Championship (1 time)
- Independent Wrestling Association Mid-South
  - IWA Mid-South Heavyweight Championship (1 time)
- Memphis Wrestling Hall of Fame
  - Class of 2017
- New Focus Wrestling
  - NFW Tri-State Championship (1 time)
- NWA Mid-South
  - NWA Mid-South Heavyweight Championship (2 times)
- NWA Mississippi / NWA Battlezone
  - NWA Mississippi Heavyweight Championship (1 time)
- NWA New Jersey
  - NWA National Heavyweight Championship (2 times)
  - NWA United States Tag Team Championship (1 time) – with Buddy Landel
- Music City Wrestling
  - MCW North American Tag Team Championship (1 time) - with J. C. Ice
- United States Wrestling Association
  - USWA Heavyweight Championship (5 times)
  - USWA World Tag Team Championship (6 times) – with Tony Anthony (2), and Tommy Rich (4)
- Hoosier Pro Wrestling
  - HPW Tag Team Championship (1 time) – with Brian Christopher
- USA Championship Wrestling
  - USA Heavyweight Championship (1 time)
