= J. C. Ice =

Australian professional wrestler (born 1971)

J.C. Ice
Personal information
- Born: James Cruickshanks; 5 July 1971 (age 55) Sydney, Australia
- Relatives: Bill Dundee (father); Bobby Eaton (brother-in-law)

Professional wrestling career
- Ring name(s): Cancer Convict; Cyberpunk Ice; Jamie Dundee; J. C. Ice; J. C. the Ice Baby; Sweet Daddy Patty
- Billed height: 5 ft 8 in (1.73 m)
- Billed weight: 196 lb (89 kg)
- Billed from: Nashville, Tennessee
- Trained by: Bill Dundee
- Debut: 1988
- Retired: 2016

James Dundee (né Cruickshanks; born 5 July 1971) is an Australian-American professional wrestler. He is best known for his appearances with the United States Wrestling Association (USWA), the World Wrestling Federation (WWF), Extreme Championship Wrestling (ECW), and World Championship Wrestling (WCW) under the ring name J. C. Ice as one half of the tag team PG-13. He is also known for his appearances on the independent circuit under the ring name Jamie Dundee.

== Early life ==
Dundee was born James Cruickshanks in Sydney on 5 July 1971. He is the son of Scottish-Australian professional wrestler Bill Dundee and the brother-in-law of professional wrestler Bobby Eaton.

== Professional wrestling career ==
Cruickshanks was trained to wrestle by his father Bill Dundee and debuted in 1988 in USA Championship Wrestling in Knoxville, Tennessee, a split off from Continental Wrestling in Alabama. In the promotion, he was a manager for the Rock 'n' Roll RPMs (Mike Davis and Tommy Lane). He also fought with The Riches (Johnny and Davey) and the Armstrongs. He wrestled alongside his father in Memphis under the ring name Jamie Dundee. Some months prior to his ring debut, he participated in an angle in which he was brutalized at a TV taping by Sid Vicious. He also was a heel referee in Memphis for a brief time.

In the United States Wrestling Association (USWA) in the early 1990s, Dundee turned on his father and became J. C. Ice, a white rapper, loosely based on Vanilla Ice. He formed a tag team called PG-13 with Kelly Wolfe (known as Wolfie D) and dominated the USWA tag team division throughout the mid-1990s, winning the USWA Tag Team Championship on fifteen occasions. After losing to Bill Dundee, PG-13 were obliged to leave the USWA. They returned shortly thereafter under masks as The Cyberpunks, Ice (Dundee) and Fire (Wolfe). After some time, The Cyberpunks unmasked and reverted to being PG-13. During 1995 made appearances in Puerto Rico of the World Wrestling Council.

In September 1995, PG-13 entered the World Wrestling Federation (WWF) and feuded with The Smoking Gunns but were gone shortly thereafter. In November 1996, they re-appeared with the World Wrestling Federation as members of the Nation of Domination. Along with Jim Johnston and Wolfie D, he helped create their theme song. They left the WWF in May 1997.

In 1997, PG-13 appeared with Extreme Championship Wrestling (ECW), challenging the Dudley Boyz for the vacant World Tag Team Titles at Hardcore Heaven 1997. In ECW they were known for goading the audience and their opponents. They wrestled The Eliminators, Spike Dudley, and Mikey Whipwreck. In 1998, Dundee wrestled there by himself between May and June against the likes of Chris Candido, John Kronus, Chris Chetti and Balls Mahoney.

PG-13 appeared briefly for World Championship Wrestling (WCW) in 1999 and 2000. They frequently had matches with The Jung Dragons, The Varsity Club, and 3 Count.

Upon leaving WCW, Cruickshanks returned to wrestling on the independent circuit. He was briefly nicknamed "The Convict" and had a gimmick that saw him handcuffed before and after his matches.

== Personal life ==
Dundee's son, Austin, died in January 2024 at the age of 33.

In 2026 Dundee lost his father Bill.

== Championships and accomplishments ==
- Independent Wrestling Association Mid-South
  - IWA Mid-South Lightweight Championship (1 time)
- Kick-Ass Wrestling
  - KAW Light Heavyweight Championship (1 time)
  - KAW Tag Team Championship (1 time)
- Pro Wrestling Illustrated
  - PWI ranked him # 98 of the 500 best singles wrestlers of the PWI 500 in 1996
  - PWI ranked him # 435 of the 500 best singles wrestlers during the "PWI Years" in 2003.
- Showtime All-Star Wrestling
  - SAW International Tag Team Championship (1 time) with Wolfie D
- Memphis Wrestling Hall of Fame
  - Class of 2024 – Wolfie D
- Music City Wrestling
  - MCW North American Tag Team Championship (1 time) - with Doug Gilbert
- United States Wrestling Association
  - USWA Middleweight Championship (1 time)
  - USWA Television Championship (1 time)
  - USWA World Tag Team Championship (16 times) - with Bill Dundee (1) and Wolfie D (15)
- Xtreme Championship Wrestling Midwest
  - XCW Midwest Heavyweight Championship (2 times)
- New Age Wrestling Alliance
  - NAWA World Heavyweight Champion (1 time)
