= Reggie B. Fine =

American professional wrestler (born 1962)

Personal information
- Born: Reginald Walker; January 31, 1962 (age 64) Memphis, Tennessee, U.S.

Professional wrestling career
- Ring name(s): Reggie B. Fine; Reginald Walker; Candy Man; Kareem Olajuwon; King Reginald; Master B
- Billed height: 6 ft 2 in (1.88 m)
- Billed weight: 242 lb (110 kg; 17.3 st)
- Debut: 1989
- Retired: 2021

Reginald Walker (born January 31, 1962) is an American retired professional wrestler and manager. He is best known for his appearances in the Memphis-based promotion United States Wrestling Association in the 1990s under the ring name Reggie B. Fine.

== Professional wrestling career ==
Fine made his wrestling debut in 1989 for United States Wrestling Association in Memphis, Tennessee when the promotion started that year. He would feud with Koko B. Ware in the summer of 1994. He stole Koko's bird Frankie and pretended to eat it on air. The two fought matches for both the bird and Fine's fur coat. Koko was suspended for most of July for using a pipe against Fine in their match on July 4, before returning to win the bird back on July 25.

From 1995 to 1997, he worked for the WWF under his real name losing to Yokozuna, Bob Holly, Bam Bam Bigelow and the New Blackjacks.

He was a member of the original Nation of Domination in 1996 as Kareem Olajuwon. In 1997, he won the USWA Unified World Heavyweight Championship defeating Jerry Lawler. Two weeks later he dropped the title back to Lawler. Later that year, USWA closed its doors.

After USWA, Fine continued working in Memphis for Power Pro Wrestling, Memphis Championship Wrestling, Memphis Wrestling and the independents in Tennessee. He also manages wrestlers.

== Championships and accomplishments ==
- Memphis Wrestling Hall of Fame
  - Class of 2021
- Pro Wrestling Illustrated
  - PWI ranked Reggie B. Fine # 238 of the 500 best singles wrestlers of the PWI 500 in 1996
  - PWI ranked Reggie B. Fine # 285 of the 500 best singles wrestlers of the PWI 500 in 1997
- United States Wrestling Association
  - USWA World Tag Team Championship (1 time) - with Brickhouse Brown
  - USWA Unified World Heavyweight Championship
