= USWA World Tag Team Championship =

Professional wrestling tag team championship

USWA Tag Team Championship
- The championship belt.

Details
- Promotion: United States Wrestling Association
- Date established: August 11, 1989
- Date retired: November 1997
Statistics
- First champions: Cactus Jack and Scott Braddock
- Most reigns: PG-13 (professional wrestling) (Wolfie D and J. C. Ice) (16 times)
- Longest reign: The Moondogs (Spot and Spike) (At least 123 days)
- Shortest reign: Ron and Jim Harris/Tommy Rich and Doug Gilbert/Flash Flanagan and Nick Dinsmore (0 days)

The USWA World Tag Team Championship was the primary professional wrestling tag team championship promoted by the Memphis, Tennessee-based United States Wrestling Association (USWA). The Continental Wrestling Association and World Class Wrestling Association (WCWA) merged in 1989 to form the USWA. In the merger the USWA replaced both the WCWA World Tag Team Championship and the CWA Tag Team Championship with the USWA version. (Note: Duncan & Will (2000) pp. 271–273 Chapter: "Texas: WCWA World Tag Team Title [Von Erich]") (Note: Duncan & Will (2000) pp. 203–204 Chapter: "(Memphis, Nashville) Memphis: CWA Tag Team Title [Lawler, Jarrett]") The promotion awarded Cactus Jack and Scott Braddock the championship after they won the WCWA championship on August 4, 1989. The USWA closed in 1997, with PG-13 (J. C. Ice and Wolfie D) as the final champions. There were a total of 116 reigns in the eight year lifetime of the championship. (Note: Duncan & Will (2000) pp. 200–202 Chapter: "(Memphis, Nashville) Memphis: USWA Tag Team Title" [Lawler, Jarrett])

The final champions, PG-13, holds the record for most championship reigns as they held the belts on 15 different occasions across the years, in addition each member also held the championship with a different partner, making them tied for most overall reigns for an individual. The Moondogs (Spot and Spike) reign as champions lasted between 123 and 152 days, the longest of any championship team. In April 1992 Moondog Cujo replaced Spike, but records are unclear as to what date the change was made. (Note: Duncan & Will (2000) p. 201 "Moondogs [2] 1992/04") The teams of Jim and Ron Harris, (Note: Duncan & Will (2000) p. 201 "Jimmy Harris & Ron Harris 1994/12/26 Memphis, TN - PG-13 [4] 1994/12/26 Memphis, TN") Tommy Rich and Doug Gilbert, (Note: Duncan & Will (2000) p. 201 "Tommy Rich & Doug Gilbert 1995/01/09 Memphis, TN - PG-13 [5] 1995/01/09 Memphis, TN") and Flash Flanagan and Nick Dinsmore, all lost the championship on the same show that they won the championship, (Note: Duncan & Will (2000) p. 202 "Moondogs [2] 1992/04") tying them for the shortest reign.

As it is a professional wrestling championship, the championship was won not by actual competition, but by kayfabe to a match determined by the bookers and match makers. (Note: Hornbaker (2016) p. 550: "Professional wrestling is a sport in which match finishes are predetermined. Thus, win–loss records are not indicative of a wrestler's genuine success based on their legitimate abilities – but on now much, or how little they were pushed by promoters") On occasion the promotion declares a championship vacant, which means there is no champion at that point in time. This can either be due to a storyline, (Note: Duncan & Will (2000) p. 271, Chapter: Texas: NWA American Tag Team Title [World Class, Adkisson] "Championship held up and rematch ordered because of the interference of manager Gary Hart") or real life issues such as a champion suffering an injury being unable to defend the championship, (Note: Duncan & Will (2000) p. 20, Chapter: (United States: 19th Century & widely defended titles – NWA, WWF, AWA, IW, ECW, NWA) NWA/WCW TV Title "Rhodes stripped on 85/10/19 for not defending the belt after having his leg broken by Ric Flair and Ole & Arn Anderson") or leaving the company. (Note: Duncan & Will (2000) p. 201, Chapter: (Memphis, Nashville) Memphis: USWA Tag Team Title "Vacant on 93/01/18 when Spike leaves the USWA.")

== Belt designs ==
The original belts to represent the title were the WCWA World Tag Team Championship belts.

In 1990, the WCWA belts were replaced by the old USA Tag Team Championship belts that was originally used in the short-lived USA Championship Wrestling promotion in 1988, before Continental Wrestling Federation used them to replace the NWA Continental Tag Team Championship belts to represent their title. In 1996, USWA changed the red straps to black and repainted the red design on the centerpiece and the blue design on the sideplates to black.

== Title history ==
Key
No.	Overall reign number
Reign	Reign number for the specific champion
Days	Number of days held

No.	Champion	Championship change			Reign statistics		Notes	Ref.
No.	Champion	Date	Event	Location	Reign	Days	Notes	Ref.
1	Cactus Jack and Scott Braddock	August 4, 1989	USWA show	Dallas, Texas	1	7	Defeated Jeff Jarrett and Matt Borne to win the WCWA World Tag Team Championship; title renamed.	
2	Jeff Jarrett and Matt Borne	August 11, 1989	USWA show	Dallas, Texas	1	35		
3	Sheik Braddock (2) and Ron Starr	September 15, 1989	USWA show	Dallas, Texas	1	7		
—	Vacated	September 22, 1989	—	Dallas, Texas	—	—	Held up after a match against Jeff Jarrett and Matt Borne	
4	Jeff Jarrett (2) and Matt Borne (2)	September 29, 1989	USWA show	Dallas, Texas	2	(Note: The exact date the championship was vacated has not been documented, which means that the reign lasted between 33 and 62 days.)	Jarrett and Borne win rematch.	
—	Vacated	October 6, 1989	—	—	—	—	Borne lost a loser-leaves-USWA match.	
5	Robert Fuller and Brian Lee	December 1, 1989	USWA show	Dallas, Texas	1	64	Defeated Jarrett and Borne in an eight team tournament final	
6	The Southern Rockers (Rex King and Steve Doll)	February 3, 1990	USWA show	Memphis, Tennessee	1	3		
7	Robert Fuller and Brian Lee	February 6, 1990	USWA show	Louisville, Kentucky	2	6		
8	The Southern Rockers (Rex King and Steve Doll)	February 12, 1990	USWA show	Memphis, Tennessee	2	75		
9	The Uptown Posse (Brickhouse Brown and Sweet Daddy Falcone)	April 28, 1990	USWA show	Memphis, Tennessee	1	23		
10	The Southern Rockers (Rex King and Steve Doll)	May 21, 1990	USWA show	Memphis, Tennessee	3	12		
11	The Dirty White Boys (Tony Anthony and Tom Burton)	June 2, 1990	USWA show	Memphis, Tennessee	1	21	Defeated King in a handicap match.	
12	Rex King (4) and Joey Maggs	June 23, 1990	USWA show	Memphis, Tennessee	1	49		
13	Brian Lee (3) and Don Harris	August 11, 1990	USWA show	Memphis, Tennessee	1	16		
—	Vacated	August 27, 1990	—	Memphis, Tennessee	—	—	Held up after a match against Jeff Jarrett and Jeff Gaylord.	
14	Jeff Jarrett (3) and Jeff Gaylord	September 3, 1990	USWA show	Memphis, Tennessee	1	7	Won rematch; defeated Lee and Chuck Casey.	
15	Brian Lee (4) and Don Harris	September 10, 1990	USWA show	Memphis, Tennessee	2	7		
16	Jeff Jarrett (4) and Jeff Gaylord (2)	September 17, 1990	USWA show	Memphis, Tennessee	2	19		
17	Tony Anthony (2) and Doug Gilbert	October 6, 1990	USWA show	Memphis, Tennessee	1	49	Joey Maggs was allowed to defend in place of an injured Jeff Jarrett.	
18	Jeff Jarrett (5) and Cody Michaels	November 24, 1990	USWA show	Jonesboro, Arkansas	1	14		
19	Tony Anthony (3) and Doug Gilbert (2)	December 8, 1990	USWA show	Memphis, Tennessee	2	30		
20	The Fabulous Ones (Stan Lane and Steve Keirn)	January 7, 1991	USWA show	Memphis, Tennessee	1	21		
—	Vacated	January 28, 1991	—	Memphis, Tennessee	—	—	Held up in a match against Jeff Jarrett and Jerry Lawler.	
21	Jeff Jarrett (6) and Jerry Lawler	February 4, 1991	USWA show	Memphis, Tennessee	1	50	Won rematch against The Fabulous Ones.	
22	The Texas Hangmen (Killer and Psycho)	March 26, 1991	USWA show	Memphis, Tennessee	1	48		
23	Jeff Jarrett (7) and Robert Fuller (2)	May 13, 1991	USWA show	Memphis, Tennessee	1	56	Due to a pre-match stipulation, the Texas Hangmen could not compete in the USWA for a 30-day period.	
24	The Barroom Brawlers (Bonecrusher and Crowbar)	July 8, 1991	USWA show	Memphis, Tennessee	1	7		
25	Jeff Jarrett (8) and Robert Fuller (3)	July 15, 1991	USWA show	Memphis, Tennessee	2	75		
26	The Texas Outlaws (Bonecrusher and Crowbar)	September 28, 1991	USWA show	Memphis, Tennessee	2	9	The Barroom Brawlers previously lost a loser leaves town match and came back under the masks.	
27	Jeff Jarrett (9) and Robert Fuller (4)	October 7, 1991	USWA show	Memphis, Tennessee	3	28		
28	Doug Masters and Bart Sawyer	November 4, 1991	USWA show	Memphis, Tennessee	1	21		
29	Robert Fuller (5) and Mike Mitchell	November 25, 1991	USWA show	Memphis, Tennessee	1	5		
30	The Moondogs (Spot and Spike)	November 30, 1991	USWA show	Memphis, Tennessee	1	(Note: The exact date that the Cujo replaced Spike is uncertain, which means that this version of the Moondogs held the championship between 123 and 152 days.)	Defeated Fuller by disqualification in a handicap match when Jeff Jarrett interfered.	
31	The Moondogs (Spot (2) and Cujo)	April 6, 1992	USWA show	N/A	1	(Note: The exact date that the Cujo replaced Spike is uncertain, which means that this version of the Moondogs held the championship between 60 and 89 days.)	Cujo replaced Spike after Spike left the USWA.	
32	Jeff Jarrett (10) and Jerry Lawler	June 29, 1992	USWA show	Memphis, Tennessee	2	7		
33	The Moondogs (Spot (3) and Cujo (2))	July 6, 1992	USWA show	Memphis, Tennessee	2	14		
34	Jeff Jarrett (11) and Jerry Lawler (3)	July 20, 1992	USWA show	Memphis, Tennessee	3	21		
35	The Moondogs (Spot (4) and Cujo (3))	August 10, 1992	USWA show	Memphis, Tennessee	3	7		
36	Jeff Jarrett (12) and Jerry Lawler (4)	August 17, 1992	USWA show	Memphis, Tennessee	4	47		
37	The Moondogs (Spot (5) and Spike (2))	October 3, 1992	USWA show	Memphis, Tennessee	2	86	Defeated Lawler in a handicap match.	
38	The Harris Brothers (Ron and Don (3))	December 28, 1992	USWA show	Memphis, Tennessee	1	14		
39	The Moondogs (Spot (6) and Spike (2))	January 11, 1993	USWA show	Memphis, Tennessee	2	7		
—	Vacated	January 18, 1993	—	—	—	—	Spike left the USWA.	
40	The Harris Brothers (Ron and Don (4))	January 25, 1993	USWA show	Memphis, Tennessee	2	7	Defeated Jeff Jarrett and Jerry Lawler in a tournament final.	
41	The Moondogs (Spot (7) and Splat)	February 1, 1993	USWA show	Memphis, Tennessee	1	14		
42	The Harris Brothers (Ron and Don (5))	February 15, 1993	USWA show	Memphis, Tennessee	3	7		
43	The Moondogs (Spot (8) and Splat)	February 22, 1993	USWA show	Memphis, Tennessee	2	14		
44	Brian Christopher and Big Black Dog	March 8, 1993	USWA show	Memphis, Tennessee	1	7		
45	The Moondogs (Spot (9) and Splat)	March 15, 1993	USWA show	Memphis, Tennessee	3	7		
46	Brian Christopher (2) and Scotty Flamingo	March 22, 1993	USWA show	Memphis, Tennessee	1	7		
47	The Moondogs (Spot (10) and Splat (4))	March 29, 1993	USWA show	Memphis, Tennessee	4	14		
48	Simply Devine (Rex King and Steve Doll)	April 12, 1993	USWA show	Memphis, Tennessee	4	70		
49	New Jack and Homeboy	June 21, 1993	USWA show	Memphis, Tennessee	1	14		
50	C.W. Bergstrom and Melvin Penrod, Jr.	July 5, 1993	USWA show	Memphis, Tennessee	1	28		
51	The Moondogs (Spike (3) and Cujo (4))	August 2, 1993	USWA show	Memphis, Tennessee	1	14		
52	The Dog Catchers (Dog Catcher #1 and Dog Catcher #2)	August 16, 1993	USWA show	Memphis, Tennessee	3	21	The Dog Catchers were formerly known as Bone Crusher and Crowbar.	
53	The Moondogs (Spike (4) and Cujo (5))	September 6, 1993	USWA show	Memphis, Tennessee	2	7		
54	The Dog Catchers (Dog Catcher #1 and Dog Catcher #2)	September 13, 1993	USWA show	Memphis, Tennessee	4	21		
55	Moondog Spike (5) and Mike Anthony	October 4, 1993	USWA show	Memphis, Tennessee	1	12		
—	Vacated	October 16, 1993	—	—	—	—	Anthony was injured by Moondogs Spike and Splat.	
56	Jeff Jarrett (13) and Brian Christopher (3)	October 25, 1993	USWA show	Memphis, Tennessee	1	7	Defeated Jerry Lawler and Red Knight in tournament final.	
57	Koko B. Ware and Rex Hargrove	November 1, 1993	USWA show	Memphis, Tennessee	1	7		
58	Jeff Jarrett (14) and Brian Christopher (4)	November 8, 1993	USWA show	Memphis, Tennessee	2	19		
59	PG-13 (J. C. Ice and Wolfie D)	November 27, 1993	USWA show	Memphis, Tennessee	1	2	Defeated Christopher in a handicap match.	
60	Jeff Gaylord (2) and Mike Anthony (2)	November 29, 1993	USWA show	Memphis, Tennessee	1	7		
61	The War Machines	December 6, 1993	USWA show	Memphis, Tennessee	1	9		
62	Far 2 Wild (Todd Morton and Chris Michaels)	December 15, 1993	USWA show	Evansville, IN	1	19		
—	Vacated	January 3, 1994	—	Memphis, Tennessee	—	—	Held up after a match against PG-13.	
63	Far 2 Wild (Todd Morton and Chris Michaels)	January 8, 1994	USWA show	Memphis, Tennessee	2	2	Far 2 Wild wins rematch.	
64	The Harris Brothers (Ron and Don (6))	January 10, 1994	USWA show	Memphis, Tennessee	4	13		
65	Rock 'n' Roll Express (Ricky Morton and Robert Gibson)	January 23, 1994	USWA show	Memphis, Tennessee	1	8		
66	The Moondogs (Spot (11) and Rex)	January 31, 1994	USWA show	Memphis, Tennessee	1	75		
—	Vacated	April 16, 1994	—	Memphis, Tennessee	—	—	Held up after match against Billy Travis and Don Bass.	
—	Vacated	April 18, 1994	—	Memphis, Tennessee	—	—	Bass and Travis won rematch, however the titles were vacated.	
67	Brian Christopher (5) and Eddie Gilbert	April 23, 1994	USWA show	Jonesboro, Arkansas	1	9	Defeated The Eliminators in tournament final.	
68	The Eliminators (Saturn and Kronus)	May 2, 1994	USWA show	Memphis, Tennessee	1	42		
69	PG-13 (J. C. Ice and Wolfie D)	June 13, 1994	USWA show	Memphis, Tennessee	2	56		
—	Vacated	August 8, 1994	—	Memphis, Tennessee	—	—	Held up after match against Dante and The Great Mephisto.	
70	Dante and The Great Mephisto	August 15, 1994	USWA show	Memphis, Tennessee	1	14	Won rematch.	
71	PG-13 (J. C. Ice and Wolfie D)	August 29, 1994	USWA show	Memphis, Tennessee	3	49		
72	The Phantoms (Tragedy and Sorrow)	October 17, 1994	USWA show	Memphis, Tennessee	1	7		
73	The Moondogs (Spot (12) and Rex (2))	October 24, 1994	USWA show	Memphis, Tennessee	2	21		
—	Vacated	November 14, 1994	—	Memphis, Tennessee	—	—	Held up after match against Ron and Jim Harris.	
74	The Moondogs (Spot (13) and Rex (3))	November 21, 1994	USWA show	Memphis, Tennessee	3	35	Won rematch.	
75	Beauty and the Beast (Ron (5) and Jim Harris)	December 26, 1994	USWA show	Memphis, Tennessee	1	0		
76	PG-13 (J. C. Ice and Wolfie D)	December 26, 1994	USWA show	Memphis, Tennessee	4	14		
77	Tommy Rich and Doug Gilbert (3)	January 9, 1995	USWA show	Memphis, Tennessee	1	0		
78	PG-13 (J. C. Ice and Wolfie D)	January 9, 1995	USWA show	Memphis, Tennessee	5	5		
79	Tommy Rich and Doug Gilbert (4)	January 14, 1995	USWA show	Memphis, Tennessee	2	58		
80	PG-13 (J. C. Ice and Wolfie D)	March 13, 1995	USWA show	Memphis, Tennessee	6	33		
81	Brickhouse Brown (2) and The Gambler	April 15, 1995	USWA show	Memphis, Tennessee	1	16		
82	PG-13 (J. C. Ice and Wolfie D)	May 1, 1995	USWA show	Memphis, Tennessee	7	56		
—	Vacated	June 26, 1995	—	Memphis, Tennessee	—	—	Held up after a match against the Rock 'n' Roll Express.	
83	Rock 'n' Roll Express (Ricky Morton and Robert Gibson)	July 3, 1995	USWA show	Memphis, Tennessee	2	7	Won rematch.	
84	PG-13 (J. C. Ice and Wolfie D)	July 10, 1995	USWA show	Memphis, Tennessee	8	28		
85	The Heavenly Bodies (Tom Prichard and Jimmy Del Ray)	August 7, 1995	USWA show	Memphis, Tennessee	1	14		
—	Vacated	August 21, 1995	—	Memphis, Tennessee	—	—	Held up and later vacated after a match against PG-13.	
86	PG-13 (J. C. Ice and Wolfie D)	August 28, 1995	USWA show	Memphis, Tennessee	9	61	Defeated Tracy Smothers and Terry Gordy in tournament final.	
87	Tracy Smothers and Jesse James Armstrong	October 28, 1995	USWA show	Memphis, Tennessee	1	67		
88	Tommy Rich and Doug Gilbert (5)	January 3, 1996	USWA show	Memphis, Tennessee	3	10		
89	PG-13 (J. C. Ice and Wolfie D)	January 13, 1996	USWA show	Memphis, Tennessee	10	32		
90	Tracy Smothers and Jesse James Armstrong	February 14, 1996	USWA show	Memphis, Tennessee	2	3		
91	PG-13 (J. C. Ice and Wolfie D)	February 17, 1996	USWA show	Memphis, Tennessee	11	11		
92	Tommy Rich and Doug Gilbert (6)	February 28, 1996	USWA show	Memphis, Tennessee	4	26		
93	Cyberpunks (Fire and Ice)	March 25, 1996	USWA show	Memphis, Tennessee	12	54	PG-13 wearing masks	
94	Jerry Lawler (5) and Bill Dundee	May 18, 1996	USWA show	Memphis, Tennessee	1	(Note: The exact date the championship was vacated is uncertain, which means that the championship reign lasted between 14 and 29 days.)		
—	Vacated	June 4, 1996	—	—	—	—	Dundee lost a 30-day loser leaves town match.	
95	Flex Kavana and Bart Sawyer (2)	June 17, 1996	USWA show	Memphis, Tennessee	1	14	Defeated Brickhouse Brown and Reggie B. Fine in tournament final.	
96	Jerry Lawler (6) and Bill Dundee	July 1, 1996	USWA show	Memphis, Tennessee	2	7		
97	Flex Kavana and Bart Sawyer (3)	July 8, 1996	USWA show	Memphis, Tennessee	2	7		
98	Brickhouse Brown (3) and Reggie B. Fine	July 15, 1996	USWA show	Memphis, Tennessee	1	31		
99	The Moondogs (Spot (14) and Rover)	August 5, 1996	USWA show	Memphis, Tennessee	1	29		
100	Bill Dundee (3) and Jamie Dundee (13)	September 3, 1996	USWA show	Louisville, Kentucky	1	70		
—	Vacated	October 12, 1996	—	Memphis, Tennessee	—	—	Held up after a match against Brian Christopher and Wolfie D.	
101	Brian Christopher (6) and Wolfie D (13)	October 21, 1996	USWA show	Memphis, Tennessee	1	19	Won rematch.	
102	The Harris Brothers (Ron (6) and Don (7))	November 9, 1996	USWA show	Memphis, Tennessee	5	14		
103	Flash Flanagan and Steven Dunn (5)	November 23, 1996	USWA show	Memphis, Tennessee	1	34		
—	Vacated	December 27, 1996	—	Memphis, Tennessee	—	—	Held up after a match against Mike Samples and Vic the Bruiser.	
104	Flash Flanagan and Steven Dunn (6)	January 9, 1997	USWA show	Memphis, Tennessee	2	11	Defeated Mike Samples and Sir Mo.	
105	PG-13 (J. C. Ice (14) and Wolfie D (14))	January 18, 1997	USWA show	Memphis, Tennessee	13	42		
106	Billy Travis and Flash Flanagan (3)	March 1, 1997	USWA show	Memphis, Tennessee	1	21		
107	The Truth Commission (Recon and Interrogator)	March 22, 1997	USWA show	Memphis, Tennessee	1	7		
108	Billy Travis and Flash Flanagan (4)	March 29, 1997	USWA show	Memphis, Tennessee	2	14		
109	The Shooting Stars (Troy Haste and Jerry Faith)	April 12, 1997	USWA show	Memphis, Tennessee	1	7		
110	The Truth Commission (Recon and Interrogator)	April 19, 1997	USWA show	Memphis, Tennessee	2	25		
111	Steven Dunn (7) and Paul Diamond	May 14, 1997	USWA show	West Helena, Arkansas	1	14		
112	The Truth Commission (Recon and Interrogator)	May 28, 1997	USWA show	West Helena, Arkansas	3	17		
113	Flash Flanagan (5) and Nick Dinsmore	June 14, 1997	USWA show	Memphis, Tennessee	1	0		
—	Vacated	June 14, 1997	—	Memphis, Tennessee	—	—	Defeated Recon and Tank (substituting for Sniper), however the titles were declared vacant because a substitute cannot defend.	
114	PG-13 (J. C. Ice (15) and Wolfie D (15))	July 13, 1997	USWA show	Memphis, Tennessee	14	36	Defeated Flash Flanagan and Steven Dunn.	
115	Flash Flanagan (6) and Steven Dunn (8)	August 8, 1997	USWA show	Memphis, Tennessee	3	23		
116	PG-13 (J. C. Ice (16) and Wolfie D (16))	August 31, 1997	USWA show	Memphis, Tennessee	15	(Note: The exact date that the championship was abandoned has not been documented, which means that this title reign lasted between 62 and 91 days.)		
—	Deactivated	November 2, 1997	—	—	—	—	The titles were abandoned when the USWA closed.	

== Team reigns by combined length ==
Key
¤	The exact length of at least one title reign is uncertain, so the shortest possible length is used.

Rank	Team	No. of reigns	Combined days
1	PG-13 / Cyberpunks (J. C. Ice and Wolfie D)	15	541¤
2	The Moondogs (Spot and Spike)	3	216¤
3	Jeff Jarrett and Robert Fuller	3	159
4	The Moondogs (Spot and Rex)	3	131
5	Jeff Jarrett and Jerry Lawler	4	125
6	Tommy Rich and Doug Gilbert	4	94
7	The Southern Rockers (Rex King and Steve Doll)	3	90
9	Tony Anthony and Doug Gilbert	2	79
9	The Moondogs (Spot and Cujo)	3	71¤
10	Bill Dundee and Jamie Dundee	1	70
10	Robert Fuller and Brian Lee	2	70
10	Simply Devine (Rex King and Steve Doll)	1	70
10	Tracy Smothers and Jesse James Armstrong	2	70
14	Flash Flanagan and Steven Dunn	3	68
14	Jeff Jarrett and Matt Borne	2	68¤
16	Texas Outlaws / Barrom Brawlers / Dog Catchers (Bonecrusher and Crowbar)	2	58
17	The Harris Brothers (Ron and Don)	5	56
18	Rex King and Joey Maggs	1	49
18	The Moondogs (Spot and Splat)	4	49
18	The Truth Commission (Recon and Interrogator)	3	49
21	The Texas Hangmen (Killer and Psycho)	1	48
22	The Eliminators (Saturn and Kronus)	1	42
23	Brickhouse Brown and Reggie B. Fine	1	31
24	The Moondogs (Spot and Rover)	1	29
25	C.W. Bergstrom and Melvin Penrod, Jr.	1	28
26	Jeff Jarrett and Brian Christopher	2	26
26	Jeff Jarrett and Jeff Gaylord	2	26
28	Billy Travis and Flash Flanagan	2	25
29	Brian Lee and Don Harris	2	23
29	The Uptown Posse (Brickhouse Brown and Sweet Daddy Falcone)	1	23
31	Doug Masters and Bart Sawyer	1	21
31	Far 2 Wild (Todd Morton and Chris Michaels)	2	21
31	Flex Kavana and Bart Sawyer	2	21
31	Jerry Lawler and Bill Dundee	2	21
31	The Dirty White Boys (Tony Anthony and Tom Burton)	1	21
31	The Fabulous Ones (Stan Lane and Steve Keirn)	1	21
31	The Moondogs (Spike and Cujo)	2	21
38	Brian Christopher and Wolfie D (13)	1	19
39	Brickhouse Brown and The Gambler	1	16
40	Dante and The Great Mephisto	1	14
40	New Jack and Homeboy	1	14
40	Rock 'n' Roll Express (Ricky Morton and Robert Gibson)	2	14
40	Steven Dunn and Paul Diamond	1	14
40	The Heavenly Bodies (Tom Prichard and Jimmy Del Ray)	1	14
45	Moondog Spike and Mike Anthony	1	12
46	Brian Christopher and Eddie Gilbert	1	9
46	The War Machines	1	9
48	Brian Christopher and Big Black Dog	1	7
48	Brian Christopher and Scotty Flamingo	1	7
48	Cactus Jack and Scott Braddock	1	7
48	Jeff Gaylord and Mike Anthony	1	7
48	Koko B. Ware and Rex Hargrove	1	7
48	Sheik Braddock and Ron Starr	1	7
48	The Phantoms (Tragedy and Sorrow)	1	7
48	The Shooting Stars (Troy Haste and Jerry Faith)	1	7
56	Robert Fuller and Mike Mitchell	1	5
57	Beauty and the Beast (Ron and Jim Harris)	1	0
57	Flash Flanagan and Nick Dinsmore	1	0

== Individual reigns by combined length ==
Key
¤	The exact length of at least one title reign is uncertain, so the shortest possible length is used.

Rank	Wrestler	No. of reigns	Combined days
1	J. C. Ice	16	611¤
2	Wolfie D	16	560¤
4	Moondog Spot	14	496¤
5	Jeff Jarrett	13	404¤
6	Spike	6	249
7	Steven Dunn / Steve Doll	8	242
8	Robert Fuller	6	234
9	Rex King	5	209
10	Doug Gilbert	6	173
11	Jerry Lawler	6	146
12	Rex	3	131
13	Tony Anthony	3	100
14	Tommy Rich	4	94
15	Brian Lee	4	93
15	Flash Flanagan	6	93
17	Moondog Cujo	5	92¤
18	Bill Dundee	3	91
19	Don Harris	7	79
20	Brickhouse Brown	3	70
20	Jesse James Armstrong	2	70
20	Tracy Smothers	2	70
23	Brian Christopher	6	68
23	Matt Borne	2	68¤
25	Bonecrusher	2	58
25	Crowbar	2	58
27	Ron Harris	6	56
28	Interrogator	3	49
28	Joey Maggs	1	49
28	Recon	3	49
28	Moondog Splat	4	49
32	Killer	1	48
32	Psycho	1	48
34	Kronus	1	42
34	Saturn	1	42
36	Bart Sawyer	3	41
37	Jeff Gaylord	3	33
38	Reggie B. Fine	1	31
39	Moondog Rover	1	29
40	C.W. Bergstrom	1	28
40	Melvin Penrod Jr.	1	28
42	Billy Travis	2	25
43	Sweet Daddy Falcone	1	23
44	Chris Michaels	2	21
44	Doug Masters	1	21
44	Flex Kavana	2	21
44	Stan Lane	1	21
44	Steve Keirn	1	21
44	Todd Morton	2	21
44	Tom Burton	1	21
51	The Gambler	1	16
52	Dante	1	14
52	The Great Mephisto	1	14
52	Homeboy	1	14
52	Jimmy Del Ray	1	14
52	New Jack	1	14
52	Paul Diamond	1	14
52	Ricky Morton	2	14
52	Robert Gibson	2	14
52	Scott Braddock / Sheik Braddock	2	14
52	Tom Prichard	1	14
61	Eddie Gilbert	1	9
61	War Machine I	1	9
61	War Machine II	1	9
64	Big Black Dog	1	7
64	Cactus Jack	1	7
64	Jerry Faith	1	7
64	Koko B. Ware	1	7
64	Mark Starr	1	7
64	Mike Anthony	1	7
64	Rex Hargrove	1	7
64	Scotty Flamingo	1	7
64	Sorrow	1	7
64	Tragedy	1	7
64	Troy Haste	1	7
74	Mike Mitchell	1	5
75	Jim Harris	1	0
75	Nick Dinsmore	1	0

== USWA Tag Team Championship Tournament (1989) ==
The USWA Tag Team Tournament was a one-night single elimination tag team tournament held in Dallas, Texas on December 1, 1989, for the vacant USWA World Tag Team Championship.

Quarterfinals
P.Y. Chu-Hi and Buddy Landel
Jimmy Jack Funk and Dustin Rhodes
Robert Fuller and Brian Lee
Kerry Von Erich and Bill Dundee
Chris Adams and Eric Embry
Gary Young and Billy Joe Travis
Matt Borne and Jeff Jarrett
Sheik Braddock and The Punisher

Semifinals
Jimmy Jack Funk and Dustin Rhodes
Robert Fuller and Brian Lee
Gary Young and Billy Joe Travis
Matt Borne and Jeff Jarrett

Final
Robert Fuller and Brian Lee
Matt Borne and Jeff Jarrett
