= USWA Middleweight Championship =

Short-lived title in the United States Wrestling Association

Details
- Promotion: United States Wrestling Association
- Date established: 1993
- Date retired: 1993
Statistics
- First champion(s): J. C. Ice
- Most reigns: All champions (1 reign)
- Longest reign: Wolfie D (92 days)
- Shortest reign: J. C. Ice (7 days)

The USWA Middleweight Championship was a short-lived title in the United States Wrestling Association for the lighter wrestlers in 1993.

== Title history ==
Key
No.	Overall reign number
Reign	Reign number for the specific champion
Days	Number of days held

No.	Champion	Championship change			Reign statistics		Notes	Ref.
No.	Champion	Date	Event	Location	Reign	Days	Notes	Ref.
1	J. C. Ice	March 1, 1993	USWA show	Memphis, Tennessee	1	7	Defeated Nightmare Danny Davis in tournament final.	
2	Danny Davis	March 8, 1993	USWA show	Tennessee	1	61		
3	Wolfie D	May 8, 1993	USWA show	Memphis, Tennessee	1	92 (Note: The exact date of the championship match is unclear, leaving Wolfie D's title reign too uncertain to calculate.)		
—	Deactivated	1993	—	—	—	—	Title was abandoned	
