= PG-13 (professional wrestling) =

Professional wrestling tag team

Tag team
- Members: J. C. Ice; Wolfie D
- Name(s): PG-13; Cyberpunks; Hood Punks; The Boys From The Hood
- Billed heights: Ice: 5 ft 8 in (1.73 m); Wolfie: 6 ft 1 in (1.85 m)
- Combined billed weight: 408 lb (185 kg)
- Hometown: Nashville, Tennessee
- Billed from: The Bronx,
- Debut: 1993
- Years active: 1993-2000, 2008, 2010, 2012

PG-13 was an Australian-American tag team composed of J. C. Ice and Wolfie D who worked for the World Wrestling Federation (WWF) and United States Wrestling Association (USWA). PG-13 briefly competed in Puerto Rico for the World Wrestling Council (WWC) in 1995, W*ING in Japan, Extreme Championship Wrestling (ECW) in 1997 and World Championship Wrestling (WCW) in 2000. They were members of the original incarnation of the Nation of Domination in the USWA and WWF.

== History ==
In the United States Wrestling Association in the early 1990s, Jamie Dundee turned on his father and became J. C. Ice, a rapper. Dundee formed a tag team known as PG-13 with Wolfie D. PG-13 dominated the USWA tag team division throughout the mid-1990s, winning the USWA Tag Team Championship on sixteen occasions. After losing to Bill Dundee, PG-13 were obliged to leave the USWA. They returned shortly thereafter under masks as The Cyberpunks, with Dundee known as "Ice" and Wolfie D known as "Fire". After some time, The Cyberpunks unmasked and reverted to being PG-13.

In a September 1995 TV taping of Monday Night Raw, PG-13 appeared with the World Wrestling Federation, appearing in two broadcasts, the latter against tag team champions The Smoking Gunns. They then re-appeared at Survivor Series 1996 as members of the Nation of Domination. They rapped to the ring with the Nation until June 1997 when they were released.

PG-13 then began appearing with Extreme Championship Wrestling, where they became known for goading the audience and their opponents. They wrestled The Dudley Boyz, The Eliminators, Spike Dudley, and Mikey Whipwreck, having Jason in their corner.

In 2000, PG-13 wrestled briefly for World Championship Wrestling, appearing mainly on WCW Thunder. They frequently had matches with The Jung Dragons and 3 Count. Subsequently, PG-13 appeared with Memphis Wrestling.

In early 2010, PG-13 reunited winning the tag team titles in Showtime All-Star Wrestling from Derrick King Enterprises at SAW Unfinished Business.

On February 5, 2011, PG-13 appeared in Corydon, Indiana, wrestling for XCW.

== Championships and accomplishments ==
- W*INGS
  - W*ings International Tag Team Championship (1 time)
- Kick-Ass Wrestling
  - KAW Tag Team Championship (1 time)
- Showtime All-Star Wrestling
  - SAW Tag Team Championship (1 time)
- United States Wrestling Association

- USWA World Tag Team Championship (16 times)
