= Wolfie D =

American professional wrestler (born 1973)

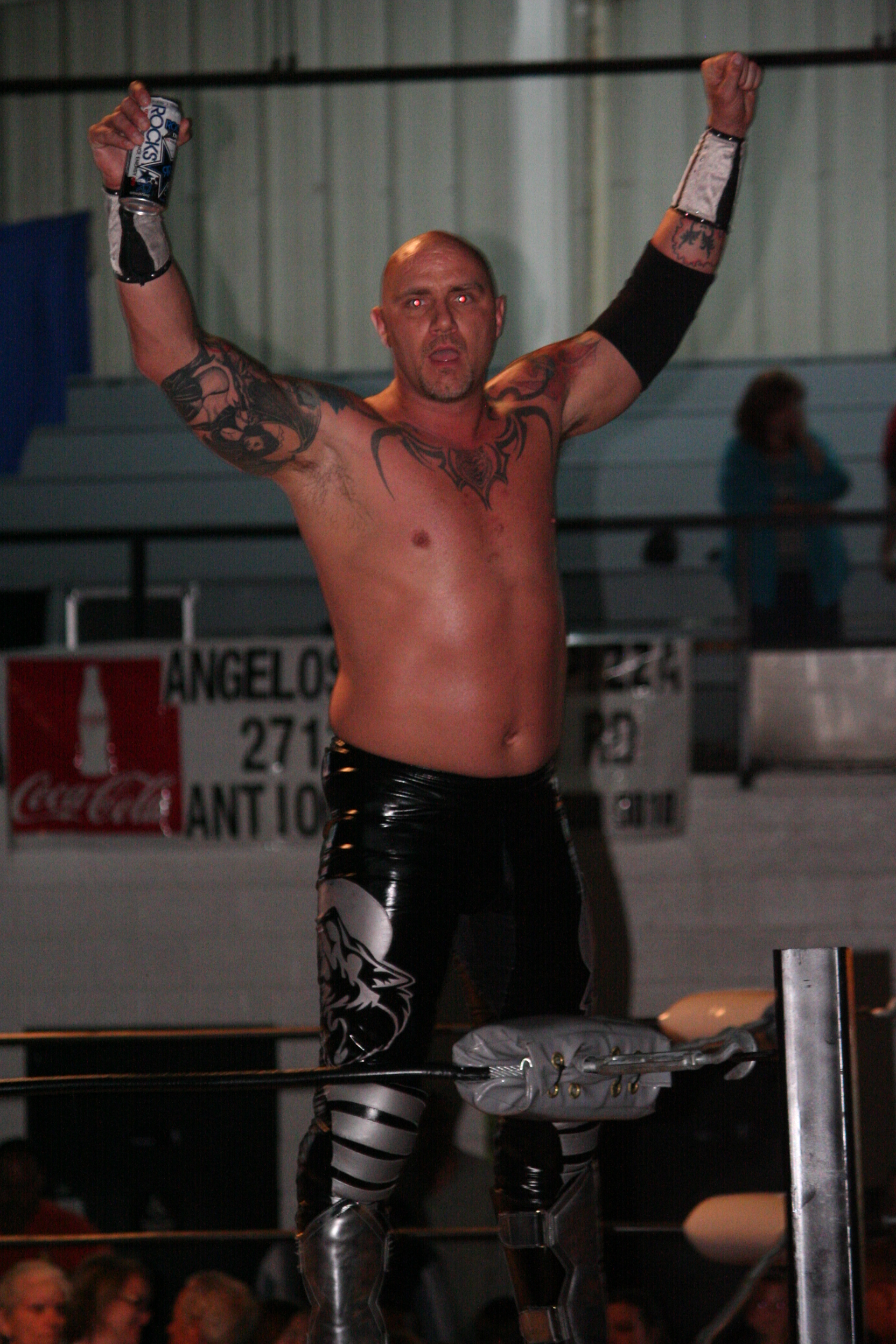
- Wolfie D in 2012

Personal information
- Born: Kelly Warren Wolfe; December 7, 1973 (age 52) Nashville, Tennessee, U.S.

Professional wrestling career
- Ring name(s): Air Wolfe; Cerebus; Cyberpunk Fire; Slash; Wolfie D
- Billed height: 6 ft 1 in (185 cm)
- Billed weight: 238 lb (108 kg)
- Debut: 1991
- Retired: 2022

Kelly Warren Wolfe (born December 7, 1973) is an American retired professional wrestler. Wolfe is perhaps best known for his appearances with the World Wrestling Federation (WWF) and Extreme Championship Wrestling (ECW) under the ring name Wolfie D (as one-half of the tag team PG-13), as well as for his appearances with Total Nonstop Action Wrestling under the ring name Slash (as a member of the stable the Disciples of The New Church). He is a former NWA World Tag Team Champion and one-half of the reigning Traditional Championship Wrestling tag team champions.

== Professional wrestling career ==
=== PG-13 (1991–2000) ===
Wolfe got his start in Jerry Lawler's United States Wrestling Alliance (USWA) and soon allied himself with J. C. Ice, forming a tag team with a white rapper gimmick known as PG-13. The team won the USWA Tag Team Championship on fifteen occasions. In 1996, PG-13 lost a Loser Leaves Town match against Ice's father, "Superstar" Bill Dundee. Shortly thereafter, a new masked tag team known as "The Cyberpunks" (Fire and Ice) appeared, which was really PG-13 in disguise. After a number of attempts to unmask them failed, they unmasked themselves upon having PG-13 reinstated into the USWA. During 1995 made appearances in Puerto Rico of the World Wrestling Council

In 1995, PG-13 began wrestling occasional matches in the World Wrestling Federation (WWF). The following year, they joined the Nation of Domination stable. They rapped to introduce the stable before matches, but they did not actually wrestle during this period. They also appeared in Extreme Championship Wrestling (ECW), competing against the team of Mikey Whipwreck and Spike Dudley and unsuccessfully challenging Buh Buh Ray and D-Von Dudley for the ECW Tag Team Championship at Hardcore Heaven in 1997. In 2000, the team appeared for a few months in World Championship Wrestling, competing against the Yung Dragons and 3 Count.

After splitting from Ice, Wolfie worked in the Memphis area with his accomplice, the helmeted driver known only as the Getaway Guy. Wolfie performed particularly evil misdeeds in the ring and would immediately head for the back of the arena, where his Wolf Mobile, a bright yellow Mustang drag car racer waited. The Getaway Guy, dressed in black leather and wearing a black helmet that could not be seen into, waited with the motor running. Wolfie would leap into the car and they would drive out of the arena parking lot, well ahead of any wrestler chasing them. It was later revealed that the Getaway Guy was manager Nick Nitros.

=== Slash (2000–2022) ===
Wolfie overhauled his gimmick in 2001, bulking up, developing an imposing goth look, and changing his ring name to Slash. He signed with World Wrestling Federation (WWF) developmental territory Ohio Valley Wrestling, where he was part of a gothic stable known as the Disciples of Synn, which included fellow members Leviathan (Batista) and Bane (Tyson Tomko).

After failing to be called up to the main WWF roster, Slash moved to Total Nonstop Action Wrestling (TNA) in late 2002, where he joined a similar stable called The New Church, led by Father James Mitchell. The group engaged in a long running feud from 2002 to 2003 against Raven and his "Gathering", with many bloody hardcore style matches between them. After a long run at the tag team titles with Brian Lee, Slash frequently teamed with Church members Shane Douglas and Sinn to face Raven, CM Punk, and Julio Dinero. Slash's final appearance for TNA was in March 2004, a loss in a tag team tournament with partner Sinn to the team of Kid Kash and Dallas.

In 2012, Wolfe opened a professional wrestling school, "Wolfie D's House of Champions", in Nashville, Tennessee. On March 5, 2013, Slash and Sinn appeared at TNA One Night Only Hardcore Justice 2. The Disciples of the New Church were defeated by Latin American Xchange (Hernandez & Homicide). He also currently wrestles in Traditional Championship Wrestling as Cerebus teaming with storyline brother, Roosevelt, as the Hounds of Hell. At Slammiversary, on June 19, 2022, Slash, managed by Father James Mitchell, made an unannounced appearance as a participant in the Reverse Battle Royal, which he failed to win as he was eliminated quickly. He then retired from wrestling.

== Championships and accomplishments ==
- Memphis Wrestling Hall of Fame
  - Class of 2024 – with J. C. Ice
- Midwestern Wrestling Association
  - MWA Heavyweight Championship (1 time)
- National Wrestling Alliance^{1}
  - NWA North American Tag Team Championship (1 time) - with Flash Flanagan
- New Age Wrestling Alliance
  - NAWA Tag Team Championship (1 time) - with Damian
- North American All Star Wrestling
  - NAASW North American Heavyweight Championship (1 time)
- Ohio Valley Wrestling
  - OVW Southern Tag Team Championship (2 times) - with Damian
- Power Pro Wrestling
  - PPW Heavyweight Championship (2 times)
  - PPW Tag Team Championship (1 time) - by himself
- Pro Wrestling Illustrated
  - Ranked No. 103 of the top 500 wrestlers in the PWI 500 in 1996
- Showtime All-Star Wrestling
  - NWA Southern Heavyweight Championship (1 time)
  - SAW International Tag Team Championship (1 time) - with J. C. Ice
- Southern All Star Wrestling / New South Championship Wrestling
  - NSCW Heavyweight Championship (1 time)
- Total Nonstop Action Wrestling
  - NWA World Tag Team Championship (1 time) - with Brian Lee
- Traditional Championship Wrestling
  - TCW Tag Team Championship (1 time) - with Roosevelt The Dog
- United States Wrestling Association
  - USWA Heavyweight Championship (1 time)
  - USWA Middleweight Championship (1 time)
  - USWA Television Championship (1 time)
  - USWA World Tag Team Championship (16 times) - with J. C. Ice (15), and Brian Christopher (1)
- United States Wrestling Organization
  - USWO Heavyweight Championship (2 times)
  - USWO Tag Team Championship (1 time) - with L.T. Falk

^{1}Records are unclear as to which promotion he wrestled for when he and Flanagan won the championship.

== Personal life ==
Wolfe currently is the World Champion of Auto Sales at Don Franklin Chevrolet Buick GMC. Currently lives in Somerset Kentucky with Michelle Myers.

In July 2021, Wolfe started, Live and In Color with Wolfie D podcast, it's a conversation based, autobiographical podcast covering his time in professional wrestling. With co-host Jimmy Street, they also feature guests that are Wolfie's old friends from the professional wrestling business.
