= Moondog Spike =

American professional wrestler (1950–2013)

Personal information
- Born: William Smithson; May 31, 1950
- Died: March 21, 2013 (aged 62)

Professional wrestling career
- Ring name(s): Moondog Spike; Dizzy Golden; Inferno #1
- Billed height: 6 ft 2 in (188 cm)
- Billed weight: 345 lb (156 kg)
- Trained by: Tojo Yamamoto
- Debut: 1978
- Retired: 2011

William Smithson (May 31, 1950 – March 21, 2013) was a professional wrestler who wrestled as Moondog Spike during the early 1990s with Moondog Spot from 1991 to 1992 and Moondog Cujo from 1992 to 1993 as part of The Moondogs.

== Professional wrestling career ==
Trained by Tojo Yamamoto in Tennessee, Smithson made his debut in 1978 as a tag team partner of Jerry Ralph in one of the many incarnations of the "Inferno" tag teams managed by Mike Duprée. During the mid-1980s, under the name Dizzy Golden, he formed a tag team with his storyline brother Mike Golden in the Mid-South area winning the Texas All-Star U.S.A. Tag Team Championship twice during a feud with the "Dream Team" of King Parsons and Tiger Conway Jr. in 1986 and reigned as its last tag team champions until the title was retired in November 1986 following the federation's purchase by World Class Championship Wrestling. He briefly went to Memphis after the demise of Texas All Star Wrestling as the Australian "Bluey". He was bought in by George Barnes to help feud with Bill Dundee who Barnes had turned on and said Dundee had gotten too "American". That same year he worked for All Japan Pro Wrestling. After that he went to ICW in the New England area where he wrestled there in late 1987 and 1988 as Moondog Spike.He won the Hwy Title as well as twice the Tag straps.

In 1991, Smithson began teaming with Moondog Spot in the Memphis-based United States Wrestling Association. Together they violently feuded with Jeff Jarrett and Jerry "The King" Lawler throughout the year; the feud being featured in Pro Wrestling Illustrated's "Feud of the Year" in 1992.

With Moondog Spot's retirement the following year, Lanny Keane, Jr. was brought in as Moondog Cujo to replace Moondog Spot. Smithson and Keane, Jr. would feud with The Dogcatchers and win the USWA Southern Tag Team Championships several times before Lanny Keane left to pursue a singles career as Bloody Ox Brody. In 1993 he returned to Japan teaming with Moondog Splat for W*ING. Smithson disappeared soon after the split however, possibly due to health problems resulting from his weight gain. He would work occasionally in the independent circuit until his last match in 2011. He died in March 2013.

== Championships and accomplishments ==
- International Championship Wrestling (New England)
  - ICW Heavyweight Championship (1 time)
  - ICW Tag Team Championship (2 times) - with Moondog Spot (1) and The Dungeon Master (1)
- Memphis Wrestling Hall of Fame
  - Class of 2022 - with The Moondogs
- Texas All-Star Wrestling
  - Texas All-Star USA Tag Team Championship (2 times) with Mike Golden
- United States Wrestling Association
  - USWA World Tag Team Championship (6 times) - with Moondog Spot (3), Moondog Cujo (2) and Mike Lozansky (1)
- Pro Wrestling Illustrated
  - PWI ranked him # 150 of the 500 best singles wrestlers in the PWI 500 in 1992.
