= Cousin Junior =

American professional wrestler (1960–2009)

- Kean as "Big Daddy Cyrus" in Memphis in 1995

Personal information
- Born: Lanny Neal Kean Jr. March 19, 1960 Jamestown, Kentucky, U.S.
- Died: January 13, 2009 (aged 48) Franklin, Indiana, U.S.
- Cause of death: Heart attack
- Children: 1

Professional wrestling career
- Ring name(s): Big Daddy Cyrus; Cousin Junior; King Harley Hogg; Lanny Kean; Moondog Cujo; Ox Brody
- Billed height: 6 ft 3 in (1.91 m)
- Billed weight: 354 lb (161 kg)
- Billed from: Mud Lick, Kentucky (as Cousin Junior)
- Debut: 1983

Lanny Neal Kean Jr. (March 19, 1960 – January 13, 2009) was an American professional wrestler. He is best known for his appearances with the World Wrestling Federation from 1985 to 1986 under the ring name Cousin Junior, as well as for his appearances on the independent circuit as Moondog Cujo, a member of the Moondogs.

== Professional wrestling career ==
=== Early career (1983–1984) ===
Kean made his professional wrestling debut in Kentucky in 1983, where he competed as "Luscious" Lanny Kean.

=== World Wrestling Federation (1984–1986) ===
In 1984, Kean began wrestling for the World Wrestling Federation (WWF) as a jobber, performing as Lanny Kean. In 1985, he was given the gimmick of Cousin Junior, a member of Hillbilly Jim's hillbilly family stable. The Hillbillies were portrayed as simple rural Southerners who performed square dances in the ring.

They feuded with wrestlers including Jesse Ventura, Bob Orton, Jr., and Roddy Piper. Kean's character was modeled on the character of Jethro Bodine from the television program The Beverly Hillbillies. Kean left the WWF in 1986.

=== Independent circuit and hiatus (1986–1992) ===
In 1986, Kean joined the Continental Wrestling Association under the ring name Hillbilly Junior, where he formed a tag team with Giant Hillbilly. The duo won the AWA Southern Tag Team Championship on August 30, 1986, by defeating the Fire and Flame. Kean wrestled sporadically on the independent circuit throughout the mid-1980s, including in the NWA in 1988 under the name Cousin Junior once again.

=== United States Wrestling Association (1992–1997) ===
In 1992, Kean joined the United States Wrestling Association (USWA) as Moondog Cujo, a member of The Moondogs.

Later, he was renamed Big Daddy Cyrus and feuded with Jerry Lawler, who held the USWA Unified World Heavyweight Championship. He formed a tag team with Crusher Bones in 1995, main-eventing the Mid-South Coliseum against the likes of Lawler, Bill Dundee, and Sid Vicious. In 1996 he lost to John Tenta on WCW Saturday Night. In 1997, Dutch Mantel gave Kean the ring name "Bloody" Ox Brody, which was a tribute to Ox Baker and Bruiser Brody.

=== Hiatus and later career (2007–2008) ===
Kean took several years off of wrestling but decided to return to competition as Moondog Cujo. In one match on April 27, 2007, after his comeback, Moondog Cujo Managed by Sal Corrente defeated The Barbarian in a Hardcore match in Memphis Wrestling. He also resumed his feud with Lawler. Kean wrestled his last match on December 6, 2008, in a tag match.

== Personal life ==
Kean lived in Jamestown, Kentucky with his fiancée Sandra Deel. He had a daughter named Krystal.

On January 13, 2009, Kean died of a heart attack in Franklin, Indiana at age 48.

== Championships and accomplishments ==
- Continental Wrestling Association
  - AWA Southern Tag Team Championship (1 time) – with Giant Hillbilly
- Memphis Wrestling Hall of Fame
  - Class of 2022 - with The Moondogs
- Mid-Continental Wrestling Association
  - MWA Heavyweight Championship (1 time)
- Pro Wrestling Illustrated
  - Feud of the Year (1992) with Moondog Spot vs. Jeff Jarrett and Jerry Lawler
  - PWI ranked him #95 of the top 500 singles wrestlers in the PWI 500 in 1992
- United States Wrestling Association
  - USWA World Tag Team Championship (4 times) – with Moondog Spot (2), and Moondog Spike (2)
- World Wrestling Association (Indiana Version)
  - WWA World Tag Team Championship (1 time) - with J.R. Hogg
- Wrestling Observer Newsletter
  - Worst Tag Team (1985) with Uncle Elmer
  - Feud of the Year (1992) with Moondog Spot vs. Jeff Jarrett and Jerry Lawler

== See also ==
- List of premature professional wrestling deaths
