= Nation of Domination =

Professional wrestling stable

- The late 1997/early 1998 incarnation of the Nation, from left to right: Kama Mustafa, Faarooq, The Rock, and D'Lo Brown. Motto: "By Any Means Necessary"

Stable
- Members: Leaders: Faarooq (leader, 1996–1998); Rocky Maivia/The Rock (leader, co-leader, early 1998); Owen Hart (co-leader, 1998); Crush; Clarence Mason (Manager); Members: J.C. Ice; Wolfie D D'Lo Brown; Kama Mustafa/The Godfather; Savio Vega; Mark Henry; Ahmed Johnson
- Name(s): The Nation of Domination; The Nation; NOD
- Billed from: The Bronx
- Debut: November 17, 1996
- Disbanded: November 28, 1998
- Years active: 1996–1998

The Nation of Domination (NOD) was an American-Canadian professional wrestling stable who competed in the World Wrestling Federation (WWF) from November 17, 1996 to November 28, 1998.

The group was formed by newcomer Faarooq in 1996 and remained an influential faction in the company. While in the group, The Rock was a one-time Intercontinental Champion and D'Lo Brown was a two-time European Champion. Near the end of The Nation's existence, the group was joined by Owen Hart.

== Concept ==
The group was based loosely on the Nation of Islam and street gang lifestyle (with group members adopting Islamic names and wearing Muslim headgear) and the Black Panther Party. The extremism of the group's pro-black theme – often including the "Nation Salute" and Faarooq's angry tirades on the microphone – garnered them an excessive amount of heat from fans in arenas.

== History ==
=== Formation in WWF (1996–1997) ===
On the October 28, 1996, edition of Monday Night Raw, announcer Jim Ross revealed that Faarooq had taken Clarence Mason as his new manager after Ross recommended Mason's services for a lawsuit against Ahmed Johnson. Ross noted the duo would appear on WWF Livewire that Saturday with "big changes" in store for Faarooq, meaning the dropping of his "Roman gladiator" gimmick. The Nation of Domination heel faction would make its debut at Survivor Series, where Faarooq would be accompanied to the ring by Mason and PG-13 (J. C. Ice and Wolfie D). The four men were also accompanied by three actors, Albert Armstrong, Charles Hines, and Richard Beach, whose names were unacknowledged on screen and were supposed to represent other members of the Nation. Faarooq would team with Vader, Fake Diesel, and Fake Razor Ramon in a 4-on-4 Survivor Series elimination match against Flash Funk, Jimmy Snuka, Savio Vega and Yokozuna, where it ended in a no contest.

Many wrestlers joined the heel stable over time including Crush, D'Lo Brown, and Savio Vega. Their first feud was with Ahmed Johnson, who had a rivalry with Faarooq since SummerSlam. At the Royal Rumble, the Nation assisted Faarooq during his match against Johnson. Faarooq lost by disqualification after Crush interfered and attacked Johnson.

Faarooq, Crush, and Vega were the members of Nation of Domination who wrestled while others supported them during their matches. These three men often teamed up together in six-man tag team matches such as one at In Your House 13: Final Four against Bart Gunn, Goldust, and Flash Funk and most notably in a Chicago Street Fight at WrestleMania 13 against the Legion of Doom (Hawk and Animal) and Ahmed Johnson. At A Cold Day In Hell, the Nation faced Johnson in a Gauntlet match. Johnson defeated Crush and Vega in the Gauntlet before losing to Faarooq. The next night on Raw, JC Ice and Wolfie D would be removed from the Nation after a loss to the Legion of Doom, the Nation effectively abandoning them to their fate.

After losing JC Ice and Wolfie D, Faarooq began challenging The Undertaker for the WWF Championship at King of the Ring, after Faarooq lost the match, he blamed Crush and Vega for the loss. The next night on Raw, Faarooq went to the ring with only Mason, Brown and three bodyguards and announced that due to too much arguing in the group he fired Crush and Vega, he then fired Mason and the bodyguards for not getting involved in the matches

In reality, Clarence Mason requested to be taken out of the group because he was feeling uncomfortable with the Nation of Domination storyline and with Faarooq using racist comments in promos. The other reason was because WWF owner Vince McMahon wanted more managers to start taking more bumps and getting involved in the matches.

=== Black Supremacy and The Gang Warz (1997–1998) ===
On the June 16 episode of Raw Is War, Faarooq promised that he would deliver a "Bigger, Badder, Better and Blacker" version of the Nation. This led to the induction of Kama Mustafa and Ahmed Johnson into the group after Johnson turned on then WWF Champion The Undertaker during a tag team match against Faarooq and Kama. They would be known as "The New Nation Of Domination" and after a couple of weeks, the "New" was dropped. A week after this version was formed, Crush turned face and formed his own stable The Disciples of Apocalypse and they attacked the Nation and injuring Ahmed Johnson's knee which kept him out of action for a month. Meanwhile Savio Vega turned tweener and formed his own stable Los Boricuas.

Ahmed Johnson would later return to action but in mid-August, Faarooq fired Johnson from the group claiming that he wasn't black enough to be a member (the WWF actually wanted him out of the group because they felt his injuries that he kept suffering were preventing him from too much competition) and Rocky Maivia turned heel and joined the group and changed his name to "The Rock" because he was unhappy with how he was treated by the fans by chanting "Rocky sucks!" and "Die, Rocky Die!"

In the following months, the Nation feuded with Los Boricuas and the Disciples of Apocalypse. This feud culminated in a triple threat match between Faarooq, Vega, and Crush who were the leaders of Nation, Los Boricuas, and DOA respectively at Ground Zero, which Vega won. They restarted their feud with the Legion of Doom, whom the Nation defeated at Badd Blood: In Your House in a 3-on-2 handicap match. As part of his heel turn, Rocky Maivia shortened and changed his ring name to The Rock. Around this time, Ahmed Johnson restarted the feud with the Nation as well and joined the Legion of Doom and Ken Shamrock. This led to a Survivor Series match at Survivor Series, which the Nation lost to the Legion of Doom, Johnson, and Shamrock. At D-Generation X: In Your House, The Rock got a shot at the Intercontinental Championship against Stone Cold Steve Austin. In the closing minutes of the match, Austin performed a Stone Cold Stunner on the referee. A second referee came down to count a pin for Austin, although the first referee intended to disqualify Austin.

As a result of this controversy, Austin was forced to defend the title against The Rock the next night on Raw Is War. Rock was awarded the Intercontinental Championship, however, after Austin forfeited him the title instead of defending the title in a rematch, delivering a stunner on Rock and took the championship belt back afterward. Austin appeared the next week on Raw is War, taunting Rock and eventually throwing the Intercontinental Championship belt over a bridge, into a river. Ken Shamrock, who was already a rival of the Nation, began feuding with The Rock for the Intercontinental Championship. On the January 12, 1998 episode of Raw Is War, Mark Henry turned heel and joined the Nation, by assaulting his tag team partner, Ken Shamrock, in a tag team match against The Rock and D'Lo Brown.

=== Leadership of The Rock (1998) ===
On the March 30, 1998, episode of Raw Is War, the night after WrestleMania XIV, The Rock went on to usurp leadership of the Nation from Faarooq, at which point the group permanently dropped "of Domination" from its name and its militant focus. Instead, The Rock's gimmick spread throughout the faction with Nation members taking on considerably more hip characters, the most notable being Kama Mustafa's transformation into The Godfather, D'Lo Brown's "bobble-head" and strut, Henry's "Sexual Chocolate" ladies man gimmick, and a new hip version of the group's entrance theme, that would become associated with The Rock's character and be remixed over and over during the years to become his current theme. The Nation's primary focus by now was that The Rock retained the Intercontinental title "by any means necessary", which was the group's motto. They mainly feuded with Faarooq, who had just been kicked out of the stable. At Mayhem in Manchester, The Rock and D'Lo Brown lost to Ken Shamrock and Owen Hart. At Unforgiven: In Your House, The Nation lost to Shamrock, Faarooq, and Steve Blackman in a six-man tag team match. On the April 27 episode of Raw Is War, The Rock and Mark Henry faced Shamrock and Hart in a tag team match that saw Hart attacking Shamrock and joining the Nation.

The group then engaged in a rivalry with D-Generation X (DX), which saw the infamous parody DX performed in which they spoofed Nation members; Rock thoroughly humiliating Chyna by alluding to a possible romantic encounter between the two while the rest of DX were held at bay in their locker room by a forklift; a street fight between the two groups that wound up in Triple H being, in particular, singled out by the rest of the group and being beaten down with a ladder after Southern Justice interfered with the match on the Nation's behalf; the ladder match for the Intercontinental Championship between the two at SummerSlam; and X-Pac and Brown trading back and forth the European Championship. With Henry taking the baton in a possible "enemies to lovers" relationship with Chyna, the Nation and DX also wrestled in a six-man tag team match at Over the Edge: In Your House, which the Nation won.

=== Fall of Nation (1998) ===
Toward the end of the year, the group showed signs of dissension as Rock's mannerisms and swagger began to catch on with fans. This would lead the WWF to turn The Rock face. Hart left the group when he "injured" Dan Severn following a botched reverse piledriver on Raw Is War the night after Breakdown. The incident was a mimicry of the legit incident in which Hart injured Stone Cold Steve Austin using the same move a year earlier. The guilt from the injury to Severn led Hart to "retire", but then re-surface as The Blue Blazer, effectively ending his affiliation with the Nation. The Godfather would venture out on his own as a fan favorite, bringing with him a bevy of beauties to the ring before his match with any wrestler. Rock would later be assaulted by Brown and Henry in October 1998 which would ultimately be the end of the Nation as a faction. After kicking Godfather out of the group on the Sunday Night Heat episode before Judgment Day: In Your House, Brown and Henry briefly continued using the Nation name, a modified Titantron, and music until dropping all three by year's end as they moved on to the tag team division without the Nation moniker.

== Aftermath ==
Shortly after the Nation was disbanded, The Rock decided to run solo, riding his immense rise in popularity. He won the WWF Championship at Survivor Series and turned heel again by joining Mr. McMahon's Corporation faction. He would subsequently enjoy several years of success, not just in the world of wrestling, but also in Hollywood. Owen Hart would go on to form a successful tag team with Jeff Jarrett and later revive his Blue Blazer character before his death in May 1999.

D'Lo Brown and Mark Henry would remain a tag team following the dissolution of the Nation, enjoying moderate success. After Brown attempted to help Henry lose weight, Henry turned on Brown in the summer of 1999, ending the final remnants of the Nation of Domination. Brown would eventually hold both the Intercontinental and European titles at the height of his popularity. Henry would form his "Sexual Chocolate" character and would later be awarded the European Championship by Jeff Jarrett later that year. Henry would also go onto win the ECW World Heavyweight Championship and the World Heavyweight Championship later in his career. The Nation had something of a reunion in late 1999 when D'Lo realigned himself with The Godfather, imitating his pimp gimmick. This alliance lasted all the way into early 2000, when D'Lo turned on The Godfather, thus ending the tag team. The Godfather would later win the Intercontinental and World Tag Team Championships in the following years.

Former leader Faarooq would also find success after the group's dissolution, going on to form the highly popular tag team the Acolytes Protection Agency (APA) with Bradshaw. The APA would later win the World Tag Team Championship three times before disbanding in 2004.

As of now, The Rock, Faarooq, and Godfather are the only former members still employed by the WWE. Rock is signed on a part-time basis, while also being one of the highest paid movie stars in the world, Faarooq makes occasional appearances under his real name of Ron Simmons since his 2004 retirement, and Godfather was released in 2002 and retired to manage a gentleman's club; he still occasionally makes guest appearances in WWE. Brown was released by WWE in 2003 but was rehired in 2008; he was let go once again the following year. Faarooq, Godfather and Henry were inducted into the WWE Hall of Fame in 2012, 2016, and 2018 respectively.

== Reunion ==
Qatar Pro Wrestling announced on April 26, 2021, that Henry, Brown, Godfather and Faarooq will be reprising their roles as the Nation of Domination in the upcoming QPW SuperSlam 3 in Doha on February 26, 2022, as special guests. This will be the first reunion in 22 years.

== Members ==
- Faarooq (November 17, 1996 – March 30, 1998)
- Clarence Mason (November 17, 1996 – June 9, 1997)
- J.C. Ice (November 17, 1996 – May 12, 1997)
- Wolfie D (November 17, 1996 – May 12, 1997)
- Crush - (December 15, 1996 – June 9, 1997)
- D'Lo Brown (January 4, 1997 – November 28, 1998)
- Savio Vega (January 25, 1997 – June 9, 1997)
- Kama Mustafa/The Godfather (June 16, 1997 – October 18, 1998)
- Ahmed Johnson (June 16, 1997 – August 4, 1997)
- Rocky Maivia/The Rock (August 11, 1997 – October 12, 1998)
- Mark Henry (January 12, 1998 – November 28, 1998)
- Owen Hart (April 27, 1998 – October 5, 1998)

== Incarnations ==
- First incarnation (heel): The Nation of Domination: Original Nation
  - Type: stable
  - Active: November 17, 1996 - December 15, 1996 – June 9, 1997
  - Members: Faarooq (leader), Clarence Mason, J.C. Ice, Wolfie D, D'Lo Brown, Crush, Savio Vega
- Second incarnation (heel): The Nation of Domination
  - Type: stable
  - Active: June 9, 1997 – March 30, 1998
  - Members: Faarooq (leader), Rocky Maivia/The Rock, Kama Mustafa, D'Lo Brown, Ahmed Johnson, Mark Henry
- Third incarnation (heel): The Nation
  - Type: stable
  - Active: March 30, 1998 – October 18, 1998
  - Members: The Rock (leader), Owen Hart, D'Lo Brown, The Godfather, Mark Henry
- Fourth Incarnation (heel): The Nation
  - Type: tag team
  - Active: October 18, 1998 – November 28, 1998 ("The Nation" name was dropped; Brown and Henry continued on as a team without it)
  - Members: D'Lo Brown, Mark Henry

== Championships and accomplishments ==
- World Wrestling Federation
  - WWF European Championship (2 times) – D'Lo Brown
  - WWF Intercontinental Championship (1 time) – The Rock
