= Brian Christopher =

American professional wrestler (1972–2018)

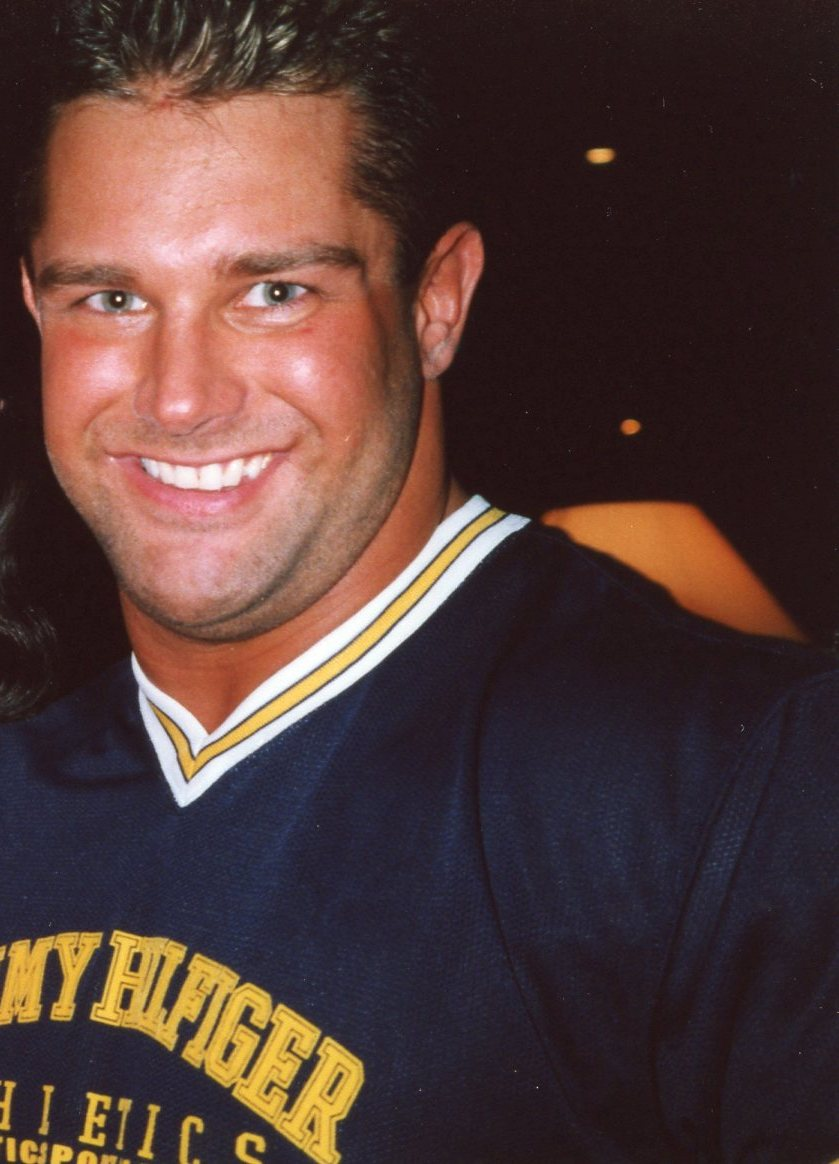
- Christopher in 2000

Personal information
- Born: Brian Christopher Lawler; January 10, 1972 Memphis, Tennessee, U.S.
- Died: July 29, 2018 (aged 46) Bolivar, Tennessee, U.S.
- Cause of death: Suicide by hanging
- Parents: Jerry Lawler (father); Kay Lawler (mother)
- Relative: The Honky Tonk Man (cousin once removed)

Professional wrestling career
- Ring name(s): Brian Christopher; Brian Lawler; El Unico; Grand Master Sexay Grandmaster Sexay
- Billed height: 5 ft 10 in (178 cm)
- Billed weight: 213 lb (97 kg)
- Billed from: Memphis, Tennessee
- Trained by: Jerry Lawler
- Debut: 1988
- Retired: 2018

Brian Christopher Lawler (January 10, 1972 – July 29, 2018) was an American professional wrestler. He is best remembered for his career in the World Wrestling Federation (now WWE), where he performed as "Too Sexy" Brian Christopher and Grand Master Sexay. Lawler was a one-time WWF Tag Team Champion as part of Too Cool with Scotty 2 Hotty, and won 44 titles within the United States Wrestling Association, the promotion formerly co-owned by his father, professional wrestler Jerry Lawler.

== Professional wrestling career ==
=== United States Wrestling Association (1988–1997) ===
Lawler began his career as one half of the masked tag team "The Twilight Zone" with Tony Williams under the individual ring names of Nebula (Lawler) and Quasar (Williams). After they were unmasked, Brian continued to wrestle in the United States Wrestling Association under the name "Too Sexy" Brian Christopher. He feuded with wrestlers such as Jeff Jarrett, Bill Dundee, Tom Prichard, and The Moondogs, and his father Jerry Lawler. Among his partners were The Rock (known as Flex Kavana at the time), Tony Williams (as the New Kids), Doug Gilbert, Scotty Flamingo, and "Hot Stuff" Eddie Gilbert. The promotion ended in November 1997.

=== World Wrestling Federation (1997–2001) ===
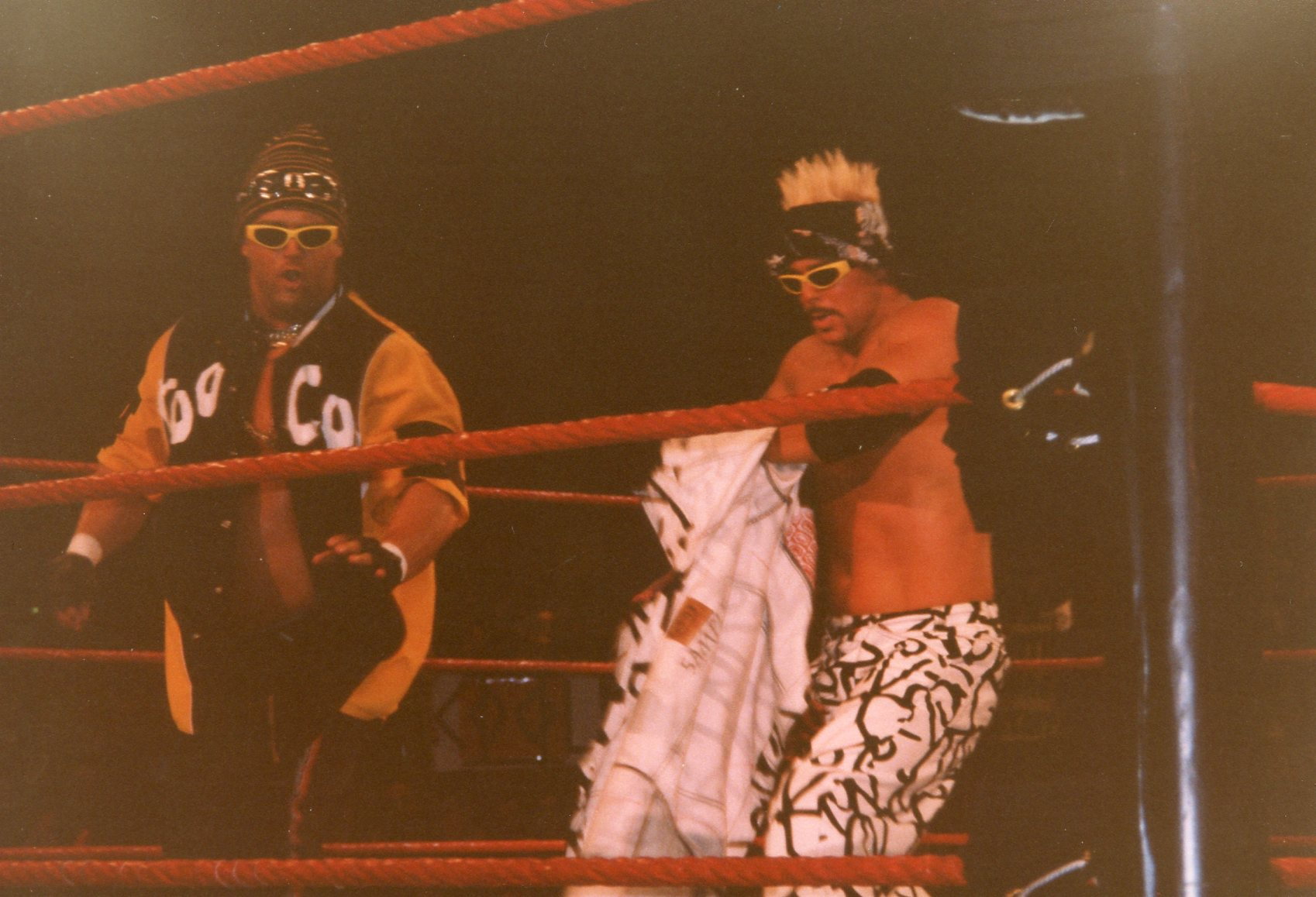
Lawler as Grandmaster Sexay (left) with Scotty 2 Hotty as Too Cool in 1999.

Lawler, still known as Brian Christopher, joined the World Wrestling Federation (WWF) in 1997 and began competing in the light heavyweight division. Taka Michinoku defeated him in the finals of a tournament for the Light Heavyweight Championship. In mid-1998, he started teaming up with Scott "Too Hot" Taylor to form the tag team Too Much. When he was known as Brian Christopher, his father Jerry Lawler would talk him up as being superior to all the other Light Heavyweights but never publicly acknowledged that Brian was his son, although after Paul Heyman revealed that fact on Raw, Jim Ross (Jerry's broadcast partner) always hinted at it. Often a running joke was that someone (usually a commentator) would mention their relationship, which led to both of them adamantly denying that they were related.

On the June 13, 1999, episode of Heat, Brian and Scott adopted the ring names Grand Master Sexay and Scotty 2 Hotty, returning after a hiatus. Their tag team was renamed Too Cool, and they were later joined by Rikishi. They defeated Edge & Christian in May 2000 on Raw to become the Tag Team Champions. They were even occasionally involved with top-card feuds, notably being enemies to the McMahon-Helmsley Faction and their associates, such as The Radicalz, Edge and Christian, and T & A. The trio's run ended in late 2000 when Rikishi was revealed as the man behind the wheel of the car that hit Stone Cold Steve Austin at Survivor Series. Shortly after, Rikishi turned on his teammates. While Scotty was sidelined in 2001 with a broken ankle, Lawler formed a short-lived tag team with Steve Blackman. In June 2001, he was released from the WWF for illegally conveying drugs across the Canada–United States border.

=== World Wrestling All-Stars (2001–2002) ===
In November and December 2001, Lawler (as Brian Christopher) wrestled in the United Kingdom and Ireland for World Wrestling All-Stars (WWA). On February 24, 2002, at the WWA pay per view "The Revolution" in the United States, Lawler wrestled WWA Heavyweight Champion Jeff Jarrett for the title, but lost. In April 2002, at the WWA pay-per-view "The Eruption" in Australia, Lawler teamed with Ernest Miller to defeat Buff Bagwell and Stevie Ray.

=== NWA Total Nonstop Action (2002–2003) ===
From 2002 until 2003, he worked for NWA Total Nonstop Action as Brian Lawler. He formed a group called Next Generation with fellow second generation stars David Flair and Erik Watts. They were involved in a rivalry with Dusty Rhodes and harassed him with a replica of the NWA World Title belt that he wore when he was champion.

=== Return to World Wrestling Entertainment / WWE (2004, 2014) ===
Lawler returned to WWE as Grand Master Sexay on April 12, 2004, but he was released the following month.

On the March 14, 2011 episode of Raw, Lawler returned to the WWE as a heel in a segment between Michael Cole and his father, Jerry Lawler, where Brian would side with Cole, saying that he felt that Jerry never cared for him and that he was ashamed to be his son. Lawler indirectly agreed, telling Brian that he was a bigger screw-up than Charlie Sheen.

Lawler returned to the WWE on January 6, 2014, appearing on the "Old School" edition of Raw and reuniting with Rikishi and Scotty 2 Hotty to take on 3MB in a six-man tag team match. His team was successful in winning. He made what would be his final WWE appearance, on NXT Arrival in February 2014 as part of Too Cool in a losing effort as mystery opponents to The Ascension, who defended their NXT Tag Team Championship.

=== Later career (2007–2017) ===
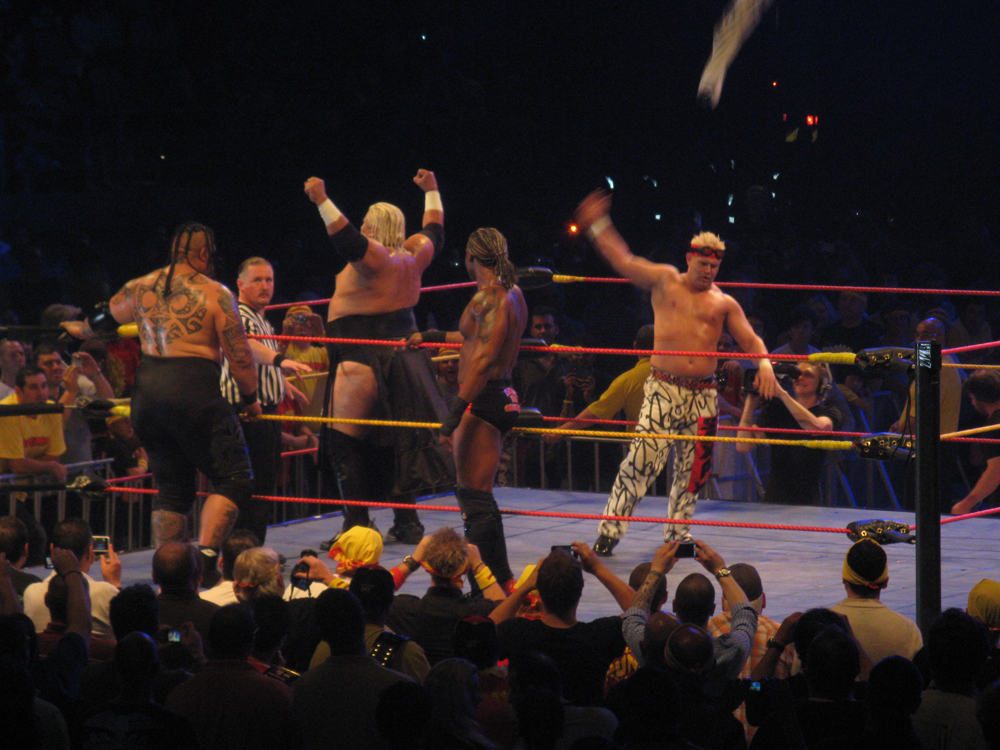
Christopher (right) taking part in the Hulkamania Let the Battle Begin Tour in 2009.

In July 2007, Christopher reunited with Scotty 2 Hotty at the UWF Rock 'n' Roll Express Tag Team Tournament, after Scotty was released by WWE.

In 2009, he worked for the Hulkamania Let the Battle Begin Tour in Australia where he teamed with Rikishi.

In 2014, Christopher and Scotty 2 Hotty continued teaming together in the independent circuit, England and Germany until 2016.

On the weekend of September 22 and 23, 2017, Christopher teamed with his dad and Doug Gilbert for two matches to Terry Funk and The Rock 'n' Roll Express for Big Time Wrestling in Raleigh, North Carolina and Spartanburg, South Carolina, both resulting in a loss.

Christopher's last match was on November 11, 2017 where he defeated Donnie Primetime for Georgia Premier Wrestling in Canton, Georgia.

== Personal life ==
Lawler was married to Davah Lawler between 1996 and 2008. He dated and later proposed to Jessica (Campbell) Asberry in Scotland on Valentines Day in 2016. Lawler had a son named Blake who did scholastic wrestling.

Lawler was a Pittsburgh Steelers fan, in stark contrast to his father, who is a diehard Cleveland Browns fan. According to his brother Kevin, Lawler was buried in a Steelers-themed casket with his ring name.

Lawler was arrested in February 2009 for disorderly conduct. On June 26, 2009, he was arrested for public intoxication just before 3 a.m. According to the police report, he "became very belligerent" once in custody and threatened the police officer who arrested him. On July 13, 2009, he was jailed for 30 days after failing to attend an in-patient treatment center as part of his plea agreement.

== Death ==
Around 1 a.m. EDT on July 7, 2018, Lawler was again jailed for driving under the influence, and for evading police. On the early morning of July 29, 2018, Lawler was found hanging in a cell at the Hardeman County Jail and was observed to be brain dead. His life support was disabled a few hours after his father Jerry Lawler had arrived at the hospital to see him. Lawler was pronounced dead at around 4:40 p.m. EDT at the age of 46.

On the one year anniversary of his death, Jerry Lawler filed a wrongful death lawsuit against Hardeman County, Hardeman County Sheriff John Doolen, and others for allegedly failing to protect Lawler. He alleged that Doolen had personally promised to "keep an eye" on Lawler after he was incarcerated. The case was dismissed on September 20, 2024.

== Championships and accomplishments ==
- Hoosier Pro Wrestling
  - HPW Tag Team Championship (1 time) – with Doug Gilbert
- Lethal Attitude Wrestling
  - LAW Heavyweight Championship (1 time)
- Memphis Superstars of Wrestling
  - MSW Junior Heavyweight Championship (1 time)
- Memphis Wrestling
  - Memphis Wrestling Southern Heavyweight Championship (1 time)
  - Memphis Wrestling Television Championship (1 time)
- Memphis Wrestling Hall of Fame
  - Class of 2022
- National Wrestling Alliance
  - NWA North American Tag Team Championship (1 time) – with Spellbinder
- NWA New South
  - New South Heavyweight Championship (1 time)
- Powerhouse Championship Wrestling
  - PCW Light Heavyweight Championship (1 time)
- Power Pro Wrestling
  - PPW Television Championship (1 time)
- Pro Wrestling Illustrated
  - Ranked No. 367 of the 500 best singles wrestlers of the "PWI Years" in 2003
- Ultimate Christian Wrestling
  - UCW Tag Team Championship (1 time) – with Billy Jack
- United States Wrestling Association
  - USWA Heavyweight Championship (26 times)
  - USWA Junior Heavyweight Championship (1 time)
  - USWA Southern Heavyweight Championship (8 times)
  - USWA Texas Heavyweight Championship (1 time)
  - USWA World Tag Team Championship (6 times) – with Big Black Dog (1), Scotty Anthony (1), Jeff Jarrett (2), Eddie Gilbert (1) and Wolfie D (1)
- Global Wrestling Federation
  - GWF Light Heavyweight Championship (2 times)
- World Wrestling Federation
  - WWF Tag Team Championship (1 time) – with Scotty 2 Hotty
- The Official Wrestling Museum
  - The Official Wrestling Museum Hall of Fame (2023)

== See also ==
- List of premature professional wrestling deaths
