= Memphis Wrestling =

American professional wrestling promotion

- Founded: 2003
- Defunct: 2014
- Style: Rasslin'
- Headquarters: Memphis, Tennessee, United States
- Founder: Corey Maclin
- Predecessor: United States Wrestling Association; Memphis Championship Wrestling
- Successor: Unofficial: Jerry Lawler's Memphis Wrestling; Championship Wrestling from Memphis

Memphis Wrestling was an American professional wrestling promotion based in Memphis, Tennessee. Founded in 2003, Memphis Wrestling evolved from an earlier short-lived promotion called Memphis Championship Wrestling. The promotion became defunct in 2014.

== Television ==
The Memphis Wrestling in-studio television show, Memphis Wrestling: Home of Rhythm and Bruise, was broadcast weekly on WLMT-TV CW30 Memphis, the Memphis, Tennessee affiliate of The CW Television Network, and was produced in the WLMT studio. It was originally broadcast every Saturday morning at 11 AM CT, beginning on May 17, 2003. In 2006, due to numerous conflicts with other Saturday morning broadcasting commitments, such as college football, the weekly broadcast moved to 10 PM CT and was renamed Memphis Wrestling Prime Time. The promotion also aired internationally on the Fight Network in Europe, while also airing on the Fight Network in Canada.

In January 2008, Memphis Wrestling began running repeats of previously-aired shows. On August 9, 2008, Memphis Wrestling returned to its 11 AM Saturday spot, now on channel 50. The show ceased airing in 2014.

== Championships ==
- Memphis Wrestling Light Heavyweight Championship
- Memphis Wrestling Southern Heavyweight Championship
- Memphis Wrestling Southern Tag Team Championship
- Memphis Wrestling Southern Television Championship (defunct)

== See also ==
- Continental Wrestling Association
- List of independent wrestling promotions in the United States
