= List of former Global Wrestling Federation personnel =

The Global Wrestling Federation was a professional wrestling promotion based in Dallas, Texas from 1991 to 1994. Former employees in the GWF consisted of professional wrestlers, managers, play-by-play and color commentators, announcers, interviewers and referees.

== Alumni ==
=== Male wrestlers ===
Birth name:	Ring name(s):	Tenure:	Notes
Chris Adams ^{†}	Chris Adams	1993–1994	
Kevin Adkisson	Kevin Von Erich	1993	
Kerry Adkisson ^{†}	Kerry Von Erich	1993	
Richard Allen	Sonny Beach	1991	
William Ansor ^{†}	Buddy Landel	1991	
Tony Anthony	Dirty White Boy	1991	
Marcus Bagwell	The Handsome Stranger	1991	
Jeff Bearden	Giant Warrior / Paul Bunyan	1991–1992	
James Bednarski	Scott Putski	1991–1994	
Józef Bednarski	Ivan Putski	1992	
Quentin Bell ^{†}	Bubba Monroe	1992	
Thomas Bertan ^{†}	Tom Burton / Tom Davis	1991–1992	
Daniel Briley	Danny Davis / Nightmare #1	1991–1992, 1994	
Timothy Brooks^{†}	Killer Tim Brooks	1992–1993	
Nick Busick ^{†}	Big Bully Busick	1991	
David Canal	The Cuban Assassin / The Hitman	1991	
Galen Carpenter	General von Kessler / Gerald von Kessler	1993	
Allen Coage ^{†}	Bad News Allen / Bad News Brown	1991	
Steven Casey^{†}	Steven Dane	1991–1994	
Steve Cox	Steve Cox	1991–1992	
William Danenhauer	Captain Ron	1993	
Mike Davis ^{†}	Mike Davis / Michael Worthington Davis III / The Viper	1991–1994	
Eric Downey	Eric Fontaine / The Zebra Kid	1991	
Bobby Duncum Jr. ^{†}	Bobby Duncum Jr.	1992–1993	
Bill Eadie	Axis The Demolisher / Masked Superstar	1991, 1993	
Sid Eudy ^{†}	Sid Justice	1993	
John Frankel III	John Tatum	1991–1993	
Mick Foley	Cactus Jack	1991	
Jeff Gaylord^{†}	Jeff Gaylord	1991–1992	
Khris Germany	Khris Germany	1991–1992	
Doug Gilbert	The Dark Patriot	1991–1992	
Eddie Gilbert ^{†}	Eddie Gilbert	1991–1992	
Terry Gordy ^{†}	Terry Gordy	1991, 1994	
Brian Gower	Brian Adias	1991	
George Gray	One Man Gang	1991	
Jeff Grettler	Jeff Grettler / Rico Suave	1992–1994	
Lollie Griffin	Crybaby Buxton / Francis Buxton	1993–1994	
Neal Hargrove	Reno Riggins	1991	
Brian Harris	Brian Lee	1991	
Rick Harris ^{†}	Black Bart	1991–1994	
Gary Hart ^{†}	Gary Young / Big Bertha Young	1991–1994	
Kaz Hayashi	Shiryu	1993	
Dale Hey ^{†}	Buddy Roberts	1993	
Barry Horowitz	Barry Horowitz	1991–1992	
Kenny Hreha	Vito Mussolini	1993–1994	
Booker Huffman	Booker T	1992–1993	
Lash Huffman	Stevie Ray	1992–1993	
Barney Irwin	Bill Irwin / Super Destroyer	1991–1994	
Perry Jackson	Action Jackson	1991–1994	
Joel Jones	Joel Deaton	1991	
Calvin Knapp	Calvin Knapp	1992–1994	
Wayne Knight	G.Q. Knight	1994	
Brian Knighton^{†}	Axl Rotten	1991–1993	
Stan Lane	Stan Lane	1991	
John Laurinaitis	Johnny Ace	1991	
John Layfield	John Hawk	1992–1994	
Scott Levy	Scott Anthony	1991–1992	
Jerry Lynn	Jerry Lynn / The Avenger	1991–1992	
Steven May	Steve Ray	1991	
Dennis McCord	Austin Idol	1991	
Dwayne McCullough ^{†}	Awesome Kong / Dewey	1992–1994	
Gary Mize ^{†}	Billy Travis	1991–1992	
Mike Morgan	Rip Morgan	1991	
Louis Mucciolo Jr. ^{†}	Louie Spicolli / The Body Snatcher	1991–1992	
Hoyt Murdoch ^{†}	Dick Murdoch	1993	
Osamu Nishimura	Osamu Nishimura	1994	
Tony Norris	Moadib	1993–1994	
Juan Ornelas	El Azteca / El Fantasma	1991	
Takeo Ōtsuka	Terry Boy	1993	
King Parsons	Iceman King Parsons	1991–1994	
Ken Peale	Nightmare #2	1991	
Alex Pérez	Al Perez	1991–1993	
Dean Peters ^{†}	Firecat	1991	
Alexander Pourteau	Alex Porteau	1991–1994	
Rodney Price	Rod Price	1991–1994	
Jeffrey Raitz ^{†}	Rattlesnake Jeff Raitz	1991–1992	
Bruce Reed^{†}	Butch Reed	1992	
Randal Reeder	Big Bad John / The Body Snatcher	1991–1992	
Ken Rinehurst	Jack Victory	1991–1992	
Tim Roberts	Guido Falcone / Sweet Daddy Falcone	1991–1994	
Chris Romero^{†}	Chris Youngblood / Nocona	1991–1993	
Mark Romero	Mark Youngblood / Brave Sky	1991–1993	
Kazuo Sakurada^{†}	Kendo Nagasaki	1991–1994	
Joseph Scarpa Jr.	Todd Overbow	1991–1992	
Mark Sciarra	Rip Rogers	1991	
Michael Seitz	Michael Hayes	1993–1994	
Mike Shaw ^{†}	Makhan Singh	1991	
David Sheldon ^{†}	Angel of Death	1992–1994	
Terry Simms ^{†}	Terry Garvin / Terry Simms	1991–1993	
Steve Simpson	Steve Simpson	1991–1993	
Aurelian Smith Jr.	Jake Roberts	1993	
Michael Smith	Sam Houston / The Midnight Rider	1991–1992	
Douglas Somerson^{†}	Doug Somers	1991	
Roberto Soto	Roberto Soto	1994	
Lester Speight	Rasta the Voodoo Man	1991	
Robert Swenson Jr. ^{†}	Jeep Swenson	1993–1994	
Chaz Taylor	Chaz	1991–1994	
Dickie Taylor ^{†}	Tug Taylor	1991–1994	
Paul Taylor III	Terry Taylor	1991	
Scott Thompson	King Kong	1993–1994	
Randy Unrau	Randy Rhodes	1991, 1993	
Frank Vizi	Bull Pain	1991–1992	
Reginald Walt	Candyman / Reggie B. Fine	1993	
Sean Waltman	The Lightning Kid	1991	
James Ware	Koko B. Ware / Koko Ware	1993–1994	
Billy White Jr.	Billy Black	1991	
Del Wilkes ^{†}	The Patriot	1991–1992	
James Williams	Jimmy Garvin	1994	
John Williams	Ian Rotten	1992–1993	
Dusty Wolfe	Mr. Wrestling III	1993	
Charles Wright	The Soultaker	1991	
Galton Young ^{†}	Skip Young / Super Bad	1991–1992	
Unknown	Adrian Street	1991	
Unknown	Al Jackson	1994	
Unknown	The American Ninja	1993	
Unknown	Animal	1992–1993	
Unknown	The Awesome Avenger	1994	
Unknown	Bam Bam Richardson	1993	
Unknown	Barry Usher	1991	
Unknown	Ben Jordan	1991–1992	
Unknown	Bernard Vandamme	1994	
Unknown	Big Slammer	1994	
Unknown	Big V	1994	
Unknown	Bigfoot Sanders	1993	
Unknown	Bill Glass	1993	
Unknown	Billy Steele	1993	
Unknown	The Black Assassin	1994	
Unknown	The Black Prince	1994	
Unknown	Blue Flame	1993	
Unknown	Bo Vegas	1994	
Unknown	Bobby Chase	1994	
Unknown	Boo Koo Decal	1994	
Unknown	Boris the Bounty Hunter	1993	
Unknown	Brandon Baxter	1991–1994	
Unknown	Brian Ferrar	1992	
Unknown	Brian Henning	1992–1994	
Unknown	Brian Rider	1993	
Unknown	Brotherhood of Doom #1	1993	
Unknown	Brotherhood of Doom #2	1993	
Unknown	Bubba Fangman / Corporal John Armstrong	1991, 1993–1994	
Unknown	Buddy Storm	1994	
Unknown	The Buffalo Brawler	1993	
Unknown	Bullman Downs	1993	
Unknown	Butch Blackheart	1991	
Unknown	California Blond	1991	
Unknown	Chad Champion	1993	
Unknown	Chad Starr	1993	
Unknown	Chance Taylor	1994	
Unknown	Chico Cabello	1994	
Unknown	Chico Torres / Chico Torrez	1991	
Unknown	Chris Barrett	1993	
Unknown	Chris Rox	1994	
Unknown	Chris Walker	1991	
Charles West	Chuck West	1993	
Unknown	Cory McKenzie / Gary McKenzie	1993	
Unknown	Country Dog	1993	
Unknown	Cousin Elvis	1993	
Unknown	Crusher	1993	
Unknown	Cuervo II	1994	
Unknown	Cyclone	1993	
Unknown	Dangerous Derek	1994	
Unknown	Dapper Dan	1991–1994	
Unknown	Deion Rowe / Devon Rove	1994	
Unknown	Devon Michaels	1994	
Unknown	Destruction	1993	
Unknown	Dice	1993	
Unknown	Dino Hernandez	1993	
Unknown	Dr. Doom	1993–1994	
Unknown	The Ebony Prince	1993–1994	
Unknown	Ed Robinson	1991–1993	
Unknown	El Bandolero	1991	
Unknown	El Cubano	1991	
Unknown	El Diablo	1991	
Unknown	El Grande Colosso	1991–1993	
Unknown	Frank Gilbert	1994	
Unknown	Frankie The Thumper	1994	
Unknown	Gilberto Soto	1994	
Unknown	The Gladiator / The Texas Gladiator	1993–1994	
Unknown	The Hammer	1991	
Unknown	Hurricane Ramirez	1993	
Unknown	Igor Smirnoff	1993	
Unknown	The Intruder	1994	
Unknown	Jammer	1991–1992	
Unknown	Jeff Daniels	1993	
Unknown	Jim Lord / Jimmy Lord	1994	
Unknown	Jimmy James	1991–1993	
Unknown	Jimmy Sullivan	1993	
Unknown	Johnny	1994	
Unknown	Johnny Angel	1993	
Unknown	Johnny Dollar	1993	
Unknown	Johnny Longhorn	1993	
Unknown	Johnny Mantell	1992–1993	
Unknown	Johnny Reb	1993	
Unknown	Johnny Rotten	1993	
Unknown	Ken Striker	1991	
Unknown	KGB #1	1993	
Unknown	KGB #2	1993	
Unknown	Kit Carson	1992–1994	
Unknown	Lance Thunder	1993	
Unknown	Larry Green	1991–1992	
Unknown	Larry Shane	1993	
Unknown	LaToya	1993	
Unknown	Lightning	1994	
Unknown	The Lumberjack	1993	
Unknown	Manny Villalobos	1991–1993	
Unknown	Mark Burns	1992–1993	
Unknown	Mike Diamond	1993	
Unknown	Mike Lane	1992–1993	
Unknown	Mike Reed	1992	
Mike Tatum	Mike Stetson, Mean Mike Tatum.	1991–1992	
Unknown	Mr. Masked Mystery #2 / Mr. Masked Mysterie #2	1994	
Unknown	Mr. X	1993–1994	
Unknown	Nick Golden	1994	
Unknown	Nicky Lane	1993	
Unknown	Nightstalker	1994	
Unknown	The Ninja	1991	
Unknown	Pete Longhorn	1993–1994	
Unknown	Plowboy Wilbur	1993–1994	
Unknown	Pretty Boy Jimmy	1994	
Unknown	Pretty Boy Larry	1994	
Unknown	Purple Maze	1993	
Unknown	Randy Lewis	1993	
Unknown	Raven Robert	1994	
Unknown	Raving Roberts	1993	
Unknown	Ray Evans	1991, 1993	
Unknown	Rick Barrett	1993	
Unknown	Rick Garren	1991–1994	
Unknown	Rick Gonzales	1991, 1993	
Unknown	Rick Patterson	1993	
Unknown	Ricky Long	1993–1994	
Unknown	Ricky Rob	1994	
Unknown	Ringlord #1	1994	
Unknown	Ringlord #2	1994	
Unknown	The Roughneck	1993	
Unknown	Ross Reed	1993	
Unknown	Scotty	1994	
Unknown	Shawn Summers	1992	
Unknown	Slammer	1991–1992	
Unknown	Slice	1993	
Unknown	The Masked Star	1993	
Unknown	Steve Gibbs	1993	
Unknown	Super Dave	1991	
Unknown	Tarzan Taylor	1993	
Unknown	Terry Daniels	1991	
Unknown	Tex Toby	1993	
Some Spare	Baxter Buxton	1994	
Unknown	Thunder Warrior	1993	
Lyle Jones	Kyle The Killer	1992	
Williams	Tony Williams	1992	
Unknown	Too Sweet Jones	1993	
Unknown	Travis Dalton	1993	
Unknown	Victor Gonzales	1991	
Unknown	Masked Amigo	1993	
Stephen Silva	Spider	1993	

=== Female wrestlers ===
Birth name:	Ring name(s):	Tenure:	Notes
Candace Rummel^{†}	Candy Devine	1992	
Robin Smith	Rockin' Robin	1992	
Unknown	Blue Angel	1993	
Unknown	Darling Delaine / Darling Delayne	1993	
Unknown	Diamond Donna	1994	
Unknown	Dominique Ferrari	1993	
Unknown	Lady Day / Lady Di	1993	
Unknown	Mad Madeline	1994	
Unknown	Samantha	1992	
Unknown	Terrible Tasha	1993	

=== Stables and tag teams ===
Tag team/Stable(s)	Members	Tenure(s)
The American Breed	Rick Gonzales and Dapper Dan	1991
The Bad Breed	Axl Rotten and Ian Rotten	1992–1993
The Beach Bullies	Alex Porteau and Shawn Summers	1994
The Blackbirds	Action Jackson and Iceman Parsons	1992–1994
The Brotherhood of Doom	Brotherhood of Doom #1 and Brotherhood of Doom #2	1993
Brute Force	Slammer and Jammer	1991–1992
The Butchers	Slice and Dice	1993
The California Connection	John Tatum and Rod Price	1991–1992
The Cartel	Max Andrews, Makhan Singh, Cactus Jack, Scotty Anthony and Rip Rogers	1991
The Coast To Coast Connection	Sweet Daddy Falcone, Rod Price and John Tatum	1991–1992
The Colossal Kongs	Awesome Kong and King Kong	1993–1994
Devastation Inc.	General Skandor Akbar, Action Jackson, Black Bart, Gary Young, Iceman King Parsons, John Hawk, Johnny Mantell, Moadib, Rod Price, Steven Dane, The Sicilian Studs and Tribal Nation	
The Dirty Davis Brothers	Mike Davis and Tom Davis	1991–1992
The Ebony Experience	Booker T and Stevie Ray	1992–1993
The Fabulous Freebirds	Michael Hayes, Terry Gordy and Jimmy Garvin	1993
The First Family	Eddie Gilbert and Barry Horowitz	1991
The Goodfellows	Gary Young and Steven Dane	1992
The KGB	KGB #1 and KGB #2	1993
The Maulers / The Royal Family	Jack Victory and Rip Morgan	1991
The Nightmares	Nightmare #1 and Nightmare #2	1991
The PYTs	Eric Fontaine and Randy Rhodes	1991
The Ringlords	Ringlord #1 and Ringlord #2	1994
The Rock 'n' Roll Connection	Scotty and Johnny	1994
The Rough Riders	Black Bart and Johnny Mantell	1991–1993
Super Dave and Super Bad	Super Dave and Super Bad	1991
The Super Destroyers	Bill Irwin and Gary Young	1991–1992
Sebastian & Hart Lmtd.	Gary Hart, Sebastian, Rod Price, John Tatum, and Ebony Experience	
The Sicilian Studs	Guido Falcone and Vito Mussolini	1994
The Texas Mustangs	Bobby Duncum Jr. and John Hawk	1992–1993
The Tribal Nation	Brave Sky and Nakona	1991–1993
Wet N' Wild	Sunny Beach and Steve Ray	1991
The Wild Bunch	Bill Irwin, Black Bart and Rattlesnake Raitz	1991–1992, 1994

=== Managers and valets ===
Birth name:	Ring name(s):	Tenure:	Notes
Unknown	Max Andrews / The Boss	1991–1992	
Harry Robinson	Gaston B. Means	1993	
Unknown	Witchdoctor Baboose	1993	
Toni Collins ^{†}	Toni Adams	1993–1994	
Jim Cornette	Jim Cornette	1991	
Sebastian Mahfood	Sebastian	1992–1993	
Bruce Prichard	Bruce Prichard	1992	
Jimmy Wehba ^{†}	Skandor Akbar	1991–1994	

=== Commentators and interviewers ===
Birth name:	Ring name(s):	Tenure:	Notes
Rolland Bastien^{†}	Red Bastien	1993	
Bonnie Blackstone	Boni Blackstone	1991–1992	
Jon Horton	Craig Johnson	1991–1992	
Scott Hudson	Scott Hudson	1991–1992	
Doyle King	Doyle King	1992–1994	
Marc Lowrance	Marc Lowrance		
Harvey Martin ^{†}	Harvey Martin	1992	
Joe Pedicino^{†}	Joe Pedicino	1991–1992	
Steven Prazak	Steven DeTruth	1991–1992	
Bruce Prichard	Bruce Prichard	1992–1993	
David Webb	David Webb	1992	

=== Referees ===
Birth name:	Ring name(s):	Tenure:	Notes
Unknown	James Beard		

Notes
^{†} Indicates they are deceased.
^{‡} Indicates they died while they were employed with the GWF.
