= Tom Burton =

American professional wrestler (1961–2010)

Personal information
- Born: Thomas Burton; October 14, 1961 Minneapolis, Minnesota, U.S.
- Died: March 29, 2010 (aged 48)

Professional wrestling career
- Ring name(s): Tom Burton; Tom Davis; Beef Burton
- Billed weight: 240 lb (109 kg)
- Billed from: Chicago, Illinois, U.S.
- Trained by: Brad Rheingans
- Debut: 1988
- Retired: 1998

Thomas Burton (October 14, 1961 – March 29, 2010) was an American professional wrestler, also known by his ring name Tom Davis, who competed in North American regional and independent promotions during the 1980s and early 1990s including the United States Wrestling Association (USWA), Global Wrestling Federation (GWF), the Universal Wrestling Federation (UWF) and the American Wrestling Association (AWA). He also had successful stints in international promotions such as the Japanese shoot-fighting promotion UWF International.

== Professional wrestling career ==
=== World Wrestling Federation and early career ===
Making his debut in July 1988, Burton first appeared in the World Wrestling Federation appearing on WWF Superstars of Wrestling teaming with Chris Curtis against The British Bulldogs and, in single matches, faced Brutus "The Barber" Beefcake during August 1988.

Several weeks later, while in the American Wrestling Association, he teamed with Mike Enos and Krusher Krugnoff in a 6-man tag team match against Los Guerreros (Hector, Mando and Chavo Guerrero Sr.) in September 1988 and, the following month, defeated Jerry Lynn in one of his earliest matches while touring various independent promotions in the Midwest.

During the next year, he made occasional appearances on WWF Superstars facing Hercules in Huntsville, Alabama, on January 21 and, teaming with Dusty Wolfe, against The Rockers in Madison, Wisconsin, on July 8, 1989. Appearing on WWF Wrestling Challenge later that year, he also faced Ronnie Garvin, Tito Santana, Jim "The Anvil" Neidhart and Jake "The Snake" Roberts. He also wrestled The Rockers several times, with partners Barry Hardy and Larry Lawson.

Facing Brutus Beefcake, Koko B. Ware and "Superfly" Jimmy Snuka during early 1990, Burton returned to the independent circuit for a time before settling in Memphis.

=== United States Wrestling Association ===
While in the USWA, Burton began teaming with Tony Anthony as the Dirty White Boys and, while losing to Jeff Jarrett and Billy Joe Travis on May 21, they later came back to defeat Rex King and Steve Doll for the USWA Tag Team Championship in Memphis, Tennessee on June 2, 1990, before losing to Rex King & Joey Maggs weeks later. Feuding with Billy Joe Travis, Burton had a less than successful singles career losing singles matches to Rex King and Joey Maggs before leaving the promotion later that year.

He also appeared in Jim Crockett Promotions's NWA Power Hour, teaming with Tim Hughes against Arn Anderson and Barry Windham on July 22, 1990. He also faced Lex Luger several times on WCW Worldwide before teaming with Barry Horowitz against the Renegade Warriors (Mark and Chris Youngblood) on October 13, 1990.

=== Global Wrestling Federation ===
Returning to the WWF for a short time teaming with Mike Shelton against the Legion of Doom on October 14 and, in WCW, faced Terry Taylor on November 3, 1990. The following year, he appeared in the UWF International's television debut losing to Nobuhiko Takada at Tokyo's Korakuen Hall on May 10, 1991. During the next two months, he faced Kiyoshi Tamura and Yuko Miyato before returning to the United States in early July.

Resurfacing in the Global Wrestling Federation, he lost to Terry Daniels at the Dallas Sportatorium in Dallas, Texas, on July 19, 1991. He later started teaming with Mike Davis, briefly as an incarnation of the Rock 'n' Roll RPMs, and later as Tom Davis of the Dirty Davis Brothers. In July, the two entered the 2-day GWF Tag Team Championship Tournament defeating Firecat and El Grande Coloso, the Renegade Warriors and Bill Irwin and Johnny Ace before losing to Cactus Jack and Makhan Singh in the tournament finals on July 27.

Losing to The Patriot and The Handsome Stranger during early August, he and Mike Davis faced Chris Walker and Steve Simpson, the Renegade Warriors, American Breed and Terry Garvin and Ed Robinson during the next several months.

In late September, Burton and Davis began a storyline with Chaz and Terry Garvin, defeating them on September 27 and later in a rematch on October 11. later that month Burton and Mike Davis were hired by The Lightning Kid to sideline Chaz who had been challenging The Lightning Kid for his GWF Light Heavyweight Championship. During one of their matches they had been trying to injure Chaz's knee when Tug Taylor ran to the ring. Although presumably hired by The Lightning Kid as well, Tug Taylor instead turned on the Dirty Davis Brothers and running them off. During an interview with Tug Taylor afterwards revealed that Chaz was his son and that he would be watching out for Chaz during his stay in the promotion.

Facing Brian Lee and Terry Garvin in single matches, he and Davis defeated Rick Garren and Larry Green on October 8 and Garren and Ben Jordan on October 15 before facing Tug Taylor and Terry Garvin in several indecisive matches. Losing to them in a steel cage match on November 29, Burton and Davis also lost several matches to Chaz and Tug Taylor defeating them in an elimination match on December 13, 1991. Shortly thereafter, a masked wrestler (who revealed himself to be Chaz making his return to the promotion) defeated Davis. Davis also took part in the first television taping for the American Wrestling Federation in Lowell, Massachusetts, on December 16, 1991. During the event, he faced TNT and teamed with "Iron" Mike Sharpe and Sampson against Bill Wilcox, Freight Train Fulton and Chris Candido.

Losing to John Tatum and Rod Price on January 3, the Davises continued losing matches to Chaz and Tug Taylor including a "strap on a pole" match and, in a 6-man tag team match with Billy Travis, lost to Chaz, Tug Taylor and Jerry Lynn on January 10. Fighting to a draw against Scott Putski and Gary Young, they split up after fighting to a time limit draw against Chaz and Tug Taylor on January 24, 1992.

He and Davis finally settled their feud with Mike Davis facing Chaz in which the winner would choose someone to leave the GWF. When Davis lost to Chaz, Chaz named Burton to leave the promotion.

=== UWFi ===
Having previously appeared in the promotion in late 1991 teaming with Tatsuo Nakano against Kiyoshi Tamura and Yuko Miyato at Korakuen Hall on October 6 and losing to Yuko Miyato at the Ryogoku Kokugikan on December 22, 1991, after submitting to a cross armbreaker, Burton returned to Japan in late 1992 competing full-time for UWF International.

On October 23, in one of his earliest matches, he faced Hiromitsu Kanehara at the Budokan Hall in Tokyo submitting to an ankle lock. The following month, he and Yoji Anjo defeated Kiyoshi Tamura & Yuko Miyato at the Osaka Prefectural Gymnasium on November 7 although he lost a singles match to Yuko Miyato on December 22, 1991.

Defeating Masahito Kakihara on January 9, he and Gary Albright also defeated Nobuhiko Takada and Kazuo Yamazaki at the Korakuen Hall on February 15. Losing to Kazuo Yamazaki, Tatsuo Nakano and Gary Albright during the next few months and, with Tatsuo Nakano, lost to Yoji Anjo and Mark Fleming on July 12. A month later, he and Nakano lost to Yuko Miyato and Masahito Kakihara at the Nakajima Sports Center on August 14. Knocked out by Yoshihiro Takayama on September 21, Burton also lost to Hiromitsu Kanehara before defeating Mark Silver by t.k.o. at the Ryogoku Kokugikan on December 20.

On January 10, he and Yoki Anjo lost to Tatsuo Nakano and Gene Lydick and, the following month, fought to a 20 min. time limit draw with Yoshihiro Takayama at Budokan Hall on February 14. Several months later, he teamed with Gene Lydick losing to Yoji Anjo and Masahito Kakihara on May 6 and also lost matches to Hiromitsu Kanehara, Greg Bobchick and Yoshihiro Takayama before defeating Gene Lydick at the Meiji Jingu Stadium in Tokyo on December 5, 1993.

=== World Championship Wrestling and later career ===
During 1994, he split his time between UWFi and World Championship Wrestling teaming with Bull Pain against Marcus Alexander Bagwell & 2 Cold Scorpio in Atlanta, Georgia, on January 10, 1994. The following night he faced Rick "the Dragon" Steamboat.

Defeating Kazushi Sakuraba by knockout in a non-tournament match at the 1994 Best of the World Tournament at Bukokan Hall on May 6, he lost matches to Hiromitsu Kanehara at Shootfighting III on June 10 and, returning to WCW, faced Rick Steamboat in a match for the WCW United States Heavyweight Championship on August 27 and "Flyin'" Brian Pillman on September 10.

Kennichi Yamamoto at Sedai Heavykyu Senshuken Jiki Chosen Ketteisen on November 30. In early 1995, he lost to Yoshihiro Takayama at Sekai Heavykyu Senshuken Jiai on January 16 and Hiromitsu Kanehara at SAKIGAKE on February 18 before defeating Kenichi Yamamoto at Rainbow Hall in Nagoya, Japan, on April 20. The next month, teaming with Hiromitsu Kanehara, he lost to Yoshihiro Takayama and Kazushi Sakuraba on May 17 and, during the next several months, was defeated by Yuko Miyato and Kenichi Yamamoto.

In mid to late 1995, he began wrestling in World Championship Wrestling appearing on WCW Saturday Night against "Macho Man" Randy Savage, Cobra and "Hacksaw" Jim Duggan. After a hiatus, he wrestled a handful of matches for IWA Mid-South in 1997, before he retired. He left the business sometime afterwards living with his longtime girlfriend Candi Devine until his death on March 29, 2010.

== Championships and accomplishments ==
- Pro Wrestling Illustrated
  - PWI ranked him # 356 of the 500 best singles wrestlers of the PWI 500 in 1991.
- United States Wrestling Association
  - USWA World Tag Team Championship (1 time) - with Tony Anthony
