= GWF Tag Team Championship =

Professional wrestling tag team championship

Details
- Promotion: Global Wrestling Federation
- Date established: July 27, 1991
- Date retired: September 21, 1994
Statistics
- First champions: Steve Simpson and Chris Walker
- Most reigns: (as a tag team) The Ebony Experience (3 reigns) (as individual) Black Bart (3 reigns)
- Longest reign: Black Bart and Johnny Hawk) (160 days)
- Shortest reign: Wild Bunch (Bill Irwin and Black Bart) (14 days)

The GWF Tag Team Championship was the tag team title in the Global Wrestling Federation in Texas. The title existed from 1991 until 1994, when GWF closed. The title was featured on the promotion's show that aired nationally on ESPN. It is known as the first tag team title that Harlem Heat won. In its early days, the GWF pretended on television that it was part of a larger worldwide promotion. In 1991, it was announced that a tag team known as the "English Lords" had been injured in a car wreck and that the GWF was organizing a tournament to award the vacated title in Dallas. The English Lords are not known to have existed.

== Title history ==
Key
No.	Overall reign number
Reign	Reign number for the specific team—reign numbers for the individuals are in parentheses, if different
Days	Number of days held
N/A	Unknown information
†	Championship change is unrecognized by the promotion

No.	Champion	Championship change			Reign statistics		Notes	Ref.
No.	Champion	Date	Event	Location	Reign	Days	Notes	Ref.
1	Steve Simpson and Chris Walker	July 27, 1991	House show	Dallas, Texas	1	118	Defeat Scotty Anthony and Rip Rogers in tournament final.	
2	The Coast-to-Coast Connection (John Tatum and Rod Price)	November 22, 1991	House show	Dallas, Texas	1	35	Defeated Simpson in a handicap match because Walker left for the World Wrestling Federation.	
3	The Wild Bunch (Bill Irwin and Black Bart)	December 27, 1991	House show	Dallas, Texas	1	14		
4	The Coast-to-Coast Connection (John Tatum and Rod Price)	January 10, 1992	House show	Dallas, Texas	2	70		
5	Terry Simms and Scott Putski	March 20, 1992	House show	Dallas, Texas	1	28		
—	Vacated	April 17, 1992	—	—	—	—	Titles held up after match against Gary Young and Steve Dane	
6	The Goodfellows (Gary Young and Steve Dane)	May 1, 1992	House show	Dallas, Texas	1	91	Won the rematch.	
7	The Ebony Experience (Booker T and Stevie Ray)	July 31, 1992	House show	Dallas, Texas	1	7		
8	The Black Birds (Iceman King Parsons and Action Jackson)	August 7, 1992	House show	Dallas, Texas	1	(Note: The date the championship was won and lost has not been documented which means the championship reign lasted anywhere between 24 days and 54 days.)		
9	The Ebony Experience (Booker T and Stevie Ray)	September 1992	House show	Dallas, Texas	2	(Note: The date the championship was won and lost has not been documented which means the championship reign lasted anywhere between 23 days and 52 days.)		
8	The Rough Riders (Black Bart (2) and Johnny Mantell)	October 23, 1992	House show	Dallas, Texas	1	35		
9	Texas Mustangs (Bobby Duncum Jr. and Johnny Hawk)	November 27, 1992	House show	Dallas, Texas	1	63		
10	The Bad Breed (Axl and Ian Rotten)	January 29, 1993	House show	Dallas, Texas	1	28		
11	The Ebony Experience (Booker T and Stevie Ray)	February 26, 1993	House show	Dallas, Texas	3*	70	Booker T defeated Ian Rotten in a singles match on this day. Not known if titles were on the line.	
12	Sicilian Stallions (Guido Falcone and Vito Mussolini)	May 7, 1993	House show	Dallas, Texas	1	119	May have been match for vacant titles. Ebony Experience were not announced as champions nor did they appear with Tag Team title belts at the April 23, 1993 show	
13	Skyliners (Steve Dane and Chaz Taylor)	September 3, 1993	House show	Dallas, Texas	1	113	Defeated Falcone and Alex Porteau, who substituted for Mussolini.	
14	Black Bart (3) and Johnny Hawk (2)	December 25, 1993	House show	Dallas, Texas	1	160		
15	The Fabulous Freebirds (Jimmy Garvin and Terry Gordy)	June 3, 1994	House show	Dallas, Texas	1	110		
—	Deactivated	September 21, 1994	—	—	—	—	The GWF closes.	

== Tournaments ==
=== 1991 ===
The GWF Tag Team Championship Tournament was a twenty-four man tournament for the inaugural GWF Tag Team Championship held on July 26 and July 27, 1991. Steve Simpson and Chris Walker defeated Rip Rogers and Scotty Anthony in the final to win the tournament.

First Round
Steve Simpson and Chris Walker
John Tatum and Rod Price
Kendo Nagasaki and The Ninja
Stan Lane and Steve Cox
Sonny Beach and Stevie Ray
Chico Torres and El Azteca
Terry Garvin and Chaz
Jack Victory and Rip Morgan
Mike Davis and Tom Davis
Firecat and El Grande Colosso
Bill Irwin and Johnny Ace
Jeff Gaylord and Blue Avenger
Randy Rhodes and Rick Garren
Eric Fontaine and Brian Adias
American Breed (Rick Gonzales and Dapper Dan)
Cactus Jack and Makhan Singh
Mark Youngblood and Chris Youngblood
Cuban Assassin and El Cruzado
Bad News Brown and Nick Busick
The Patriot and Terry Daniels
Joel Deaton and Billy Black
The Nightmares (Nightmare # and Nightmare #2)
Steve Dane and Handsome Stranger
Scotty Anthony and Rip Rogers
BYE
BYE
BYE
BYE
BYE
BYE

Second Round
Steve Simpson and Chris Walker
Stan Lane and Steve Cox
Sonny Beach and Stevie Ray
Jack Victory and Rip Morgan
Mike Davis and Tom Davis
Bill Irwin and Johnny Ace
Randy Rhodes and Rick Garren
Cactus Jack and Makhan Singh
Mark Youngblood and Chris Youngblood
Bad News Brown and Nick Busick
Joel Deaton and Billy Black
Scotty Anthony and Rip Rogers
BYE
BYE
BYE
BYE

Quarter Finals
Steve Simpson and Chris Walker
Jack Victory and Rip Morgan
Mike Davis and Tom Davis
Cactus Jack and Makhan Singh
Mark Youngblood and Chris Youngblood
Scotty Anthony and Rip Rogers
BYE
BYE

Semi Finals
Steve Simpson and Chris Walker
Cactus Jack and Makhan Singh
Scotty Anthony and Rip Rogers
BYE

Final
Steve Simpson and Chris Walker
Scotty Anthony and Rip Rogers

== See also ==
- Global Wrestling Federation
