= GWF North American Heavyweight Championship =

Professional wrestling championship

GWF North American/World Heavyweight Championship

Details
- Promotion: Global Wrestling Federation
- Date established: August 10, 1991
- Date retired: September 21, 1994
Statistics
- First champion: The Patriot
- Most reigns: Rod Price (3 reigns)
- Longest reign: Rod Price (168 days)
- Shortest reign: The Patriot (4 days)

The GWF North American/World Heavyweight Championship was the major title in the Global Wrestling Federation in Texas. The title existed from 1991 until 1994, when GWF closed. The title was featured on the promotion's show that aired nationally on ESPN. In 1994, the title was referred to as the GWF World or simply the GWF Heavyweight Championship interchangeably.

== Title history ==
Key
No.	Overall reign number
Reign	Reign number for the specific champion
Days	Number of days held
N/A	Unknown information
†	Championship change is unrecognized by the promotion

No.	Champion	Championship change			Reign statistics		Notes	Ref.
No.	Champion	Date	Event	Location	Reign	Days	Notes	Ref.
1	The Patriot	August 10, 1991	House show	Dallas, Texas	1	6	Defeated Al Perez in tournament final.	
—	Vacated	August 16, 1991	—	—	—	—	Patriot gave up title because Perez' feet were under the ropes during the pinfall.	
2	The Patriot	August 23, 1991	House show	Dallas, Texas	2	161	Won the rematch.	
3	The Dark Patriot	January 31, 1992	House show	Dallas, Texas	1	56		
4	"Hot Stuff" Eddie Gilbert	March 27, 1992	House show	Dallas, Texas	1	56		
—	Vacated	May 22, 1992	—	—	—	—	Gilbert was stripped of the title for failing to defend within 30 days. In reality, the GWF was no longer booking out-of-town talent due to budget cut-backs. Gilbert began wrestling for the USWA and defended the title as the GWF World Heavyweight Championship, despite having been stripped of the title upon his departure. He lost his version of the title to Jerry Lawler on June 8, 1992 in Memphis in order to "unify" it with the USWA Unified World Heavyweight Championship.	
5	Scott Putski	May 29, 1992	House show	Dallas, Texas	1	84	Defeated Johnny Mantell for the vacant title; top contenders chosen by "Best Won-Loss Record" in the GWF.	
6	Rod Price	August 21, 1992	House show	N/A	1	168	Awarded title after Putski was fired.	
7	Stevie Ray	February 5, 1993	House show	Dallas, Texas	1	145		
8	Rod Price	June 30, 1993	House show	N/A	2	(Note: The exact date that Rod Price was stripped of the title is uncertain, which puts his title reign at between 32 and 62 days.)	Awarded the championship	
—	Vacated	August 2, 1993	—	—	—	—	Stripped for actions while on tour of Japan.	
9	Iceman Parsons	September 3, 1993	House show	Dallas, Texas	1	113	Defeated Chris Adams by disqualification	
10	Chris Adams	December 25, 1993	House show	Dallas, Texas	1	97	On the January 2nd, 1994, episode the title is officially referred to the GWF "World" Heavyweight Championship or simply the GWF Heavyweight Championship.	
11	Rod Price	April 1, 1994	House show	Dallas, Texas	3	63		
—	Vacated	June 3, 1994	—	—	—	—	Held up after match with Butch Reed.	
12	Butch Reed	June 4, 1994	House show	Idabel, Oklahoma	1	27	Wins rematch.	
13	Chris Adams	July 1, 1994	House show	Dallas, Texas	2	82		
—	Deactivated	September 21, 1994	—	—	—	—	The GWF closes.	

== Tournaments ==
=== 1991 ===
The GWF North American Heavyweight Championship Tournament was a twenty-four man tournament for the inaugural GWF North American Heavyweight Championship held on August 9 and August 10, 1991. The Patriot defeated Al Perez in the final to win the tournament.

First Round
Al Perez
Handsome Stranger
John Tatum
Jeff Gaylord
Bad News Brown
El Azteca
Dirty White Boy
Austin Idol
Cactus Jack
Gary Young
Brian Lee
Bill Irwin
Steve Dane
Tug Taylor
Randy Rhodes
Terry Gordy
Steve Cox
Rod Price
Stan Lane
Action Jackson
The Patriot
The Soultaker
Axis the Demolisher
Terry Garvin
BYE
BYE
BYE
BYE
BYE
BYE

Second Round
Al Perez
John Tatum
Bad News Brown
Austin Idol
Cactus Jack
Brian Lee
Steve Dane
Terry Gordy
Steve Cox
Stan Lane
The Patriot
Axis the Demolisher
BYE
BYE
BYE
BYE

Quarter Finals
Al Perez
Austin Idol
Cactus Jack
Terry Gordy
Stan Lane
The Patriot
BYE
BYE

Semi Finals
Al Perez
Terry Gordy
The Patriot
BYE

Final
Al Perez
The Patriot

== See also ==
- Global Wrestling Federation
