= Steve Cox (wrestler) =

American professional wrestler (born 1959)

Personal information
- Born: January 1, 1959 (age 67) Portsmouth, Virginia, United States

Professional wrestling career
- Ring name: Steve Cox
- Debut: c. 1986
- Retired: 2006

Steve Cox is a retired American professional wrestler who competed in Mid-South regional promotions during the 1980s and early 1990s including the Universal Wrestling Federation, World Class Championship Wrestling and the National Wrestling Alliance.

== Career ==
=== Early career ===
Born in Portsmouth, Virginia, Cox played college football at the University of Tulsa and was team captain before becoming a professional wrestler.

During 1987, Cox appeared on several Mid-South supercards defeating Super Ninja at Superblast at the Superdome on April 11 and Gary Young at the Superdome Extravaganza on June 13 before losing to Terry Taylor at Superdome Extravaganza on August 1.

=== World Class Championship Wrestling ===
After short stints in All Star Wrestling and Central States Wrestling, he was introduced by Michael P.S. Hayes as his protégé and new tag team partner soon becoming involved in a feud with the Samoan Swat Team and defeating them for the World Class Tag Team titles on September 16 before losing it back to them three days later.

Regaining the titles at the supercard Cotton Bowl Extravaganza on October 15, they would only hold the titles for two days before losing them back to the Samoan Swat Team on October 17. After losing to the Samoan Swat Team in a rematch at SuperClash III on December 13, the team broke up shortly thereafter with both men leaving the promotion.

=== Global Wrestling Federation ===
Resurfacing in the Global Wrestling Federation during the early 1990s, Cox began teaming with Stan Lane and defeated Kendo Nagasaki and Ninja in the opening rounds of the 2-day GWF World Tag Team Title Tournament before losing to Steve Simpson and Chris Walker in the semi-finals in July 1991.

Soon after their defeat, Cox and Lane began feuding and was defeated by Lane in the semi-finals of the GWF North American Championship Tournament after defeating Rod Price in the opening rounds on August 9, 1991.

=== UWF International ===
Traveling to Japan in mid-1992, he began competing for the Japanese shoot wrestling promotion UWF International and lost to Nobuhiko Takada in Shizuoka, Japan on July 12 and again on August 28 in a tag team match with Kazuo Yamazaki against Takada and Mark Fleming at the Korakuen Hall in Tokyo, Japan. After losing a match to Kiyoshi Tamura at the Osaka Prefectural Gymnasium on September 21, he returned to the United States shortly after.

=== Later years ===
He soon began wrestling in the Oklahoma City-based Power Zone Wrestling Alliance where he would compete on and off for the next three years.

In January 1996, Cox appeared on a supercard for the Dallas-based CWA at the Dallas Sportatorium in which he teamed with Bo Vegas, Devon Michaels, Marc Valiant, Scott Putski and Dom Minoldi to defeat Firebreaker Chip, Rod Price, John Hawk, Shawn Summers, Alex Porteau and Guido Falcone in a "Bodyguards vs. Bandits" match. The match, using an unorthodox "football rules" scoring system as opposed to the standard pinfall, has been considered by some wrestling fans to be one of the most confusing, and by some accounts, boring matches held.

In 2006, Cox appeared with promoter Bill Watts and Manny Fernandez at the Ricky Morton Tag Team Invitational in Tulsa, Oklahoma on February 26.

== Championships and accomplishments ==
- Continental Wrestling Alliance
  - CWA Heavyweight Championship (1 time)
- World Class Wrestling Association
  - WCWA World Tag Team Championship (2 times) - with Michael Hayes
- Pro Wrestling Illustrated
  - Ranked No. 330 of the 500 best wrestlers in the PWI 500 in 1991
