= Scott Putski =

American professional wrestler (born 1966)

Personal information
- Born: James Scott Bednarski; May 22, 1966 (age 60) Austin, Texas, U.S.
- Family: Ivan Putski (father), Kent Bednarski (brother)

Professional wrestling career
- Ring name(s): Scott Putski; Konnan 2000
- Billed height: 5 ft 9 in (175 cm)
- Billed weight: 275 lb (125 kg)
- Billed from: Poland
- Trained by: Ivan Putski
- Debut: 1986
- Retired: 2014

James Scott Bednarski (born May 22, 1966), best known by the ring name Scott Putski, is a retired American professional wrestler. He is a second generation wrestler, being the son of his trainer Ivan Putski, alongside whom he has wrestled on several occasions.

== Professional wrestling career ==
=== Early career (1986–1991) ===
After attending college at Texas Christian University, where he played football as a running back, Bednarski trained under his father Ivan to become a professional wrestler and eventually debuted in 1986 in Texas All Star Wrestling where he teamed up with his father Ivan. In June 1988, he appeared with Jim Crockett Promotions. In May 1991 he had a tryout match for the World Wrestling Federation, defeating The Brooklyn Brawler, but was not hired.

=== Global Wrestling Federation (1991–1994) ===
In late 1991, Putski joined the Dallas-based Global Wrestling Federation.

On March 20, Putski and Terry Simms captured the Tag Team Championship from the Coast to Coast Connection ("Hollywood" John Tatum and "California Studd" Rod Price). Less than a month later, on April 17, the belts were held up following a match between Putski and Simms and the Goodfellows (Gary Young and Steven Dane). Young and Dane would go on to win the rematch on May 1 and become the undisputed champions.

On May 29, he defeated Johnny Mantell in a tournament final to capture the North American Heavyweight Championship, the federation's top singles title, which had been declared vacant after "Hot Stuff" Eddie Gilbert left the GWF for the Memphis-based United States Wrestling Association. Putski would hold the title until the promotion folded in September 1994.

=== World Wrestling Federation (1993, 1994) ===
Putski appeared in the WWF again in early 1993, winning dark matches at the January 4 and 5 television tapings, but once again made no further appearances until a Madison Square Garden house show on January 17, 1994. He defeated Iron Mike Sharpe in the opening match and then returned in the main event, a 30-man Royal Rumble match, lasting about 12 minutes before being eliminated by Headshrinker Fatu.

=== Other promotions (1993–1995) ===
After several tours in Japan and Mexico, the latter of which included the loss of his mask as Konnan 2000 to Rubén Púas Olivares on May 8, 1993. Later worked in the independents until taking a hiatus from wrestling in 1996.

=== Return to WWF (1997) ===
Putski returned to the WWF in 1997 on the May 12 episode of their show Raw, where he defeated Leif Cassidy. Soon after debuting, he began a short feud with fellow light heavyweight Brian Christopher and even teamed up with his father Ivan to defeat Christopher and his father, Jerry Lawler, on the July 14 episode of Raw. After the feud, Putski collected a number of victories against enhancement talents, before he lost to Christopher via injury, making the referee call for the bell at the pay-per-view Ground Zero: In Your House on September 7. Putski left the company shortly afterwards.

=== World Championship Wrestling (1998–1999) ===
After a brief hiatus, Putski joined World Championship Wrestling and debuted for the company on the May 4 episode of Monday Nitro, where he wrestled to a no contest against Kidman. On the July 6 episode of Nitro, he defeated Scotty Riggs to claim his first victory. Putski was squashed in under a minute by World Heavyweight Champion Goldberg on the July 9 edition of Nitro and, a month later, faced World Television Champion Chris Jericho but was unable to win the title. Putski was also defeated by World Television Champion Rick Steiner on the May 5, 1999 edition of Thunder. He continued to feature in lower-card matches, usually on the losing end, before leaving the company in late 1999.

=== Later Career (2001–2005) ===
After a two-year-long hiatus, Putski debuted for the Arlington-based Professional Championship Wrestling on December 12, 2001. While in PCW, he and Cedric Crain formed a tag team called the "Cowboys From Hell". Soon after their formation, the Cowboys won the Tag Team Championship. On July 26, Putski and Crain gave the belts to Apocalypse and Tim Storm. He wrestled until 2005.

=== Return to wrestling (2013–2014) ===
After eight years in retirement, Putski returned to the ring for the National Wrestling Alliance for their Ark-La-Tex promotion that spread throughout Arkansas, Louisiana, and Texas. On June 30, 2013, Putski became the inaugural NWA Ark-La-Tex Heavyweight Champion, defeating Killer McKenzie.

== Championships and accomplishments ==
- Continental Wrestling Alliance
  - CWA Heavyweight Championship (1 time)
- Global Wrestling Federation
  - GWF North American Heavyweight Championship (1 time)
  - GWF Tag Team Championship (1 time) – with Terry Sims
  - GWF Texas Heavyweight Championship (1 time)
- NWA Ark-La-Tex
  - NWA Ark-La-Tex Heavyweight Championship (1 time)
- Professional Championship Wrestling
  - PCW Tag Team Championship (1 time) – with Cedric Crain
- Pro Wrestling Illustrated
  - PWI ranked him #67 of the 500 best singles wrestlers in the PWI 500 in 1995
- United States Wrestling Federation (Texas)
  - USWF Texas Heavyweight Championship (1 time)
  - USWF Light Heavyweight Championship (1 time)
- Wrestle Association "R"
  - WAR World Six-Man Tag Team Championship (1 time) – with Bob Backlund and The Warlord
