= Steve Lombardi =

American professional wrestler (born 1961)

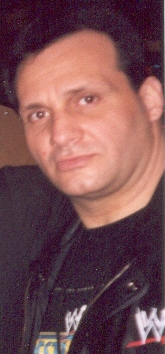
- Lombardi in 2002

Personal information
- Born: Steven Kenneth Lombardi; April 18, 1961 (age 65)

Professional wrestling career
- Ring name(s): Abe "Knuckleball" Schwartz; The Boston Brawler; The Brooklyn Brawler; The Broad Street Brawler; Doink the Clown; Kim Chee; MVP; The Black Knight; Steve Lombardi; Kimchee
- Billed height: 6 ft 0 in (1.83 m)
- Billed weight: 248 lb (112 kg)
- Billed from: Brooklyn, New York
- Trained by: Mr. Saito; Arnold Skaaland
- Debut: 1983
- Retired: 2022

Steven Kenneth Lombardi (born April 18, 1961) is an American professional wrestler and road agent, better known by his ring name, the Brooklyn Brawler. He is signed to Major League Wrestling (MLW), where he performs as an on-screen personality and promoter under the ring name Kimchee. He is best known for his tenure in WWE, as well as several independent promotions. He has regularly been listed among the greatest "jobbers" in professional wrestling.

== Early life ==
Lombardi grew up in Bensonhurst, a neighborhood in Brooklyn, New York alongside his three siblings. His father was airplane mechanic and his mother was a homemaker. He became a fan of pro wrestling during his youth by reading trade magazines and watching Lucha Libre events. Prior to becoming a wrestler Lombardi studied biochemistry at St. Francis College, during this time he also took judo classes.

== Professional wrestling career ==
=== World Wrestling Federation / WWE (1983–2016) ===
==== Early career (1983–1989) ====
Lombardi began his WWF career in late 1983, competing under his real name, and being a heel, primarily as an enhancement talent. His debut came on July 15, 1983, in Queens, New York, where he was defeated by Swede Hanson. After facing Ivan Koloff and Sgt. Slaughter on house show matches, Lombardi made his TV debut on the October 29 episode of WWF All American Wrestling, where he lost by submission to The Iron Sheik and was carried out on a stretcher. He then began regular appearances on both television and house shows.

After losing numerous matches that winter, Lombardi gained his first success on March 18, 1984, when he wrestled Jerry Valiant to a draw. Another draw, this time with Terry Daniels, came on April 24 in Mountaintop, Pennsylvania. Apart from that, he continued on as an enhancement talent, losing to much of the WWF roster including Big John Studd, Paul Orndorff, David Schultz, Iron Mike Sharpe, Rocky Johnson, and others. In the midst of another long losing streak, Lombardi gained a second draw against Daniels on June 1 in Winston-Salem, North Carolina. He made his Madison Square Garden debut on June 16, losing to Mad Dog Vachon in the latter's first match back in the WWF in a decade. A month later on July 6 in Long Island, New York, Lombardi gained his first pinfall victory when he upset Vachon in a return match. On July 31, he became involved in a mild angle with WWF World Champion Hulk Hogan during the company's initial "Championship Wrestling" taping in Poughkeepsie, New York. During a sub-minute loss to Kamala, Hogan came out to the ring to give encouragement to Lombardi. Nothing further came from this angle, and Lombardi closed out his second year as a wrestler with numerous additional losses to wrestlers such as Buddy Rose and a young Bret Hart, as well as a defeat to manager Bobby "The Brain" Heenan.

As the company continued to expand, Lombardi remained a young enhancement talent, although this time he was switched to face other similar talent in house shows across the country. He consistently put over various young wrestlers such as Paul Roma, David Sammartino, Barry O, Terry Gibbs, and George Wells. On the June 29th episode of "All-American Wrestling", Lombardi teamed with Dave Barbie in a losing effort to The Killer Bees in their debut match. Lombardi went on to face numerous wrestlers in their debuts during his long career. Almost eleven months after his first-ever victory, Lombardi gained another when he pinned Jack Armstrong on June 22 in Boston, Massachusetts. After numerous losses, Lombardi garnered the first win streak of his career a month later when he defeated Dan Rignati and George Sanders on successive house shows. On November 14, he defeated Dennis Goulet, which was followed by a win over Paul Roma on December 5 in Long Island, allowing Lombardi to finish 1985 with five wins.

Lombardi remained a consistent presence on television and house shows. The company continued to pair the young but now experienced Lombardi against other new wrestlers, and he faced newcomers such as Sivi Afi, Tony Parisi, Nick Kiniski, Dan Spivey, and Scott McGhee. He gained his first-ever tag-team win when he paired with fellow enhancement talent Lanny Poffo to defeat SD Jones and George Skaaland on April 13 in Brisbane, Australia. After dozens of defeats, he gained his first pinfall victory of 1986 in singles action when he defeated Terry Gibbs in Pittsburgh, Pennsylvania, on August 9. On the November 15 episode of WWF Superstars, he participated in another debut, teaming with Moondog Spot in a loss to the newly arrived The Can-Am Connection. Lombardi closed out 1986 with wins over Barry O, Jim Powers, Mark Young, Frankie Lane, and an upset of Tony Garea.

Despite a tick upwards in in-ring success, Lombardi began 1987 seemingly cemented as an entry-level wrestler without an angle until he established an on-screen presence as a heel. On the January 24th episode of WWF Superstars, Paul Orndorff defeated Paul Roma; following the match, Lombardi entered and tossed Roma from the ring. This led to a house show series between Roma and Lombardi, and for both wrestlers, it was their first real feud. Despite coming out winless, Lombardi was now more than just a non-descript jobber. He upset Sivi Afi on March 1 in Landover, Maryland, then gained another surprise victory over Tony Garea a month later. On June 17 Lombardi participated in yet another debut, this time facing Dingo Warrior in Wichita Falls, Texas.

A month later, he began an on-again, off-again team with Barry Horowitz, losing to The Young Stallions on the July 26 episode of Wrestling Challenge. Four weeks later, on August 21 in Detroit, the team defeated Sivi Afi and Scott Casey. After gaining a pair of pinfall singles wins over the newly arrived Sam Houston, Lombardi switched alliances to join Mike Sharpe. The two proclaimed themselves as "the tag-team of the future" in an inset during a match with The Young Stallions in August, but were unsuccessful.

Entering the fall, Lombardi continued to lose regularly but was now gaining a smattering of wins over the likes of Sivi Afi, David Sammartino, Jerry Allen, Tony Garea, and Outback Jack. Lombardi began 1988 with several squash losses, and then a win over Scott Casey on January 23 in Lexington, Kentucky. Two days later at Madison Square Garden, he resumed his partnership with Barry Horowitz and faced The Young Stallions in a losing effort. The following day in Hershey, Pennsylvania, Lombardi and Horowitz gained their first victory as a team when they defeated Scott Casey and Lanny Poffo in a match that aired on Prime Time Wrestling. The same night, they lost to The Killer Bees. The pairing continued into the summer.

Later that winter, Lombardi began a house show series with Brady Boone, and, for the first time in his career, enjoyed a consistent string of success. While still losing to top level stars on television, he was now consistently trading wins with other entry-level talent. On the March 21 episode of Prime Time Wrestling he defeated SD Jones, and began trading wins with Brady Boone. However, beginning in July, his small push seemed to dissipate as he found himself consistently on the losing end to Paul Roma and the new arrival, The Blue Blazer (Owen Hart). In December, Lombardi enjoyed the first sustained win streak of his career, defeating Jim Powers and Jose Estrada on multiple occasions and closing out 1988 on a seven-match win streak. It was a sign of Lombardi's first major angle.

==== The Brooklyn Brawler (1989–1993) ====
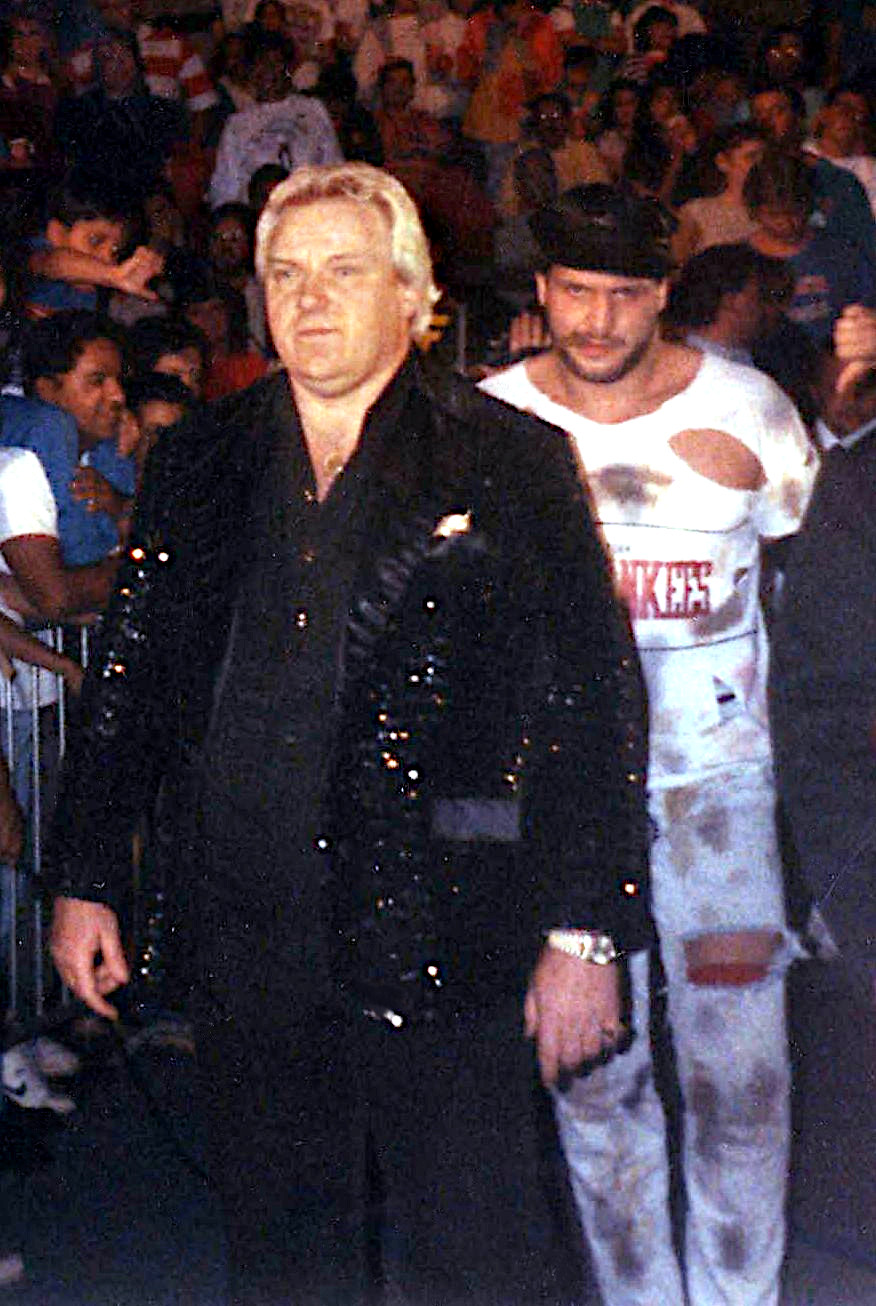
Lombardi, as The Brooklyn Brawler, being led to the ring by manager Bobby Heenan for a (victorious) match against Paul Roma on March 7, 1989, at the El Paso Civic Center

After a breakup between The Red Rooster and Bobby Heenan, the latter invited Rooster onto the set of Prime Time Wrestling on January 23 to make the peace. When Rooster was about to shake Heenan's hand he was suddenly attacked by Lombardi, who hit Rooster and host Gorilla Monsoon with a stool. The next week Lombardi made his debut as "The Brooklyn Brawler". The Brawler character was that of a street fighter/thug, wearing battered jeans and a torn New York Yankees T-shirt, which was ironic, since the Yankees play in The Bronx and were hated by many Brooklynites when the Dodgers played in the borough until moving to Los Angeles in 1958.

Under the tutelage of Bobby "The Brain" Heenan, the Brawler entered a feud with the Red Rooster. When the Red Rooster left Heenan's villain group and became a fan favorite, Heenan stated that he had made the Red Rooster a star and could do the same with anyone in the WWF. The Red Rooster defeated the Brooklyn Brawler on Saturday Night's Main Event XX, and then Heenan at WrestleMania V, who had The Brawler in his corner during the match, which after he attacked Rooster to avenge Heenan's loss. The Brawler was defeated by the Rooster again on the May 20, 1989, episode of Superstars of Wrestling. His alliance with Heenan was then phased out, though in storyline Heenan said it was an amicable departure, and Heenan continued to speak highly of the Brawler whenever a match featured him. Lombardi soon returned to his former enhancement talent status and won only five more matches (Tom Stone, Jerry Monti, Paul Roma, and Al Perez) for the rest of 1989. However, he retained the Brawler gimmick, a role he utilized throughout his career.

Now firmly re-established as an enhancement talent sans Heenan, 1990 marked a first for Lombardi when he wrestled his debut match at a PPV. At the 1990 Royal Rumble he was defeated by Paul Roma in a dark match, which marked the first of several PPVs where he worked the opening dark match to warm up the crowd. After sustaining numerous defeats to upper level talent such as Intercontinental Champion Ultimate Warrior, Lombardi finally gained a measure of revenge by pinning The Red Rooster on March 18 in Calgary, Alberta. He began a winning streak against the Rooster, who soon departed the WWF.

Lombardi wrestled the dark match of WrestleMania VI, losing again to Paul Roma. After another long string of defeats to Roma, Hillbilly Jim, Tugboat and others, Lombardi earned a smattering of victories in May against Martin Roy, Jim Brunzell, and Brady Boone. During the summer he engaged in a house show series against the newly arrived Shane Douglas but was turned away in each encounter. The two wrestled in the dark match of SummerSlam '90. On October 9 Lombardi faced Davey Boy Smith in his first match back after nearly a two-year absence, and in December he went on his first overseas tour when the WWF joined forces with Super World Sports to promote in Japan. On December 6 in Hijemi, Japan he teamed with Nuboyashi Sugawara and Kenny the Striker to defeat Biff Wellington, Road Block, and Masao Orihara. Despite his return to enhancement status, 1990 proved to be Lombardi's most successful year in his career to date as he won 35 singles matches.

Lombardi entered 1991 as probably the most prominent opening card act in the company, but the wins did not continue. Wrestling still as the Brooklyn Brawler, he was defeated by almost every member of the roster and gained just six victories during the year. On the March 30th episode of WWF Superstars, Lombardi faced Ricky Steamboat in "The Dragon"'s return match after a three-year absence. On March 24 he was pinned by Koko B. Ware in the dark match of WrestleMania VII. Other notable losses saw Brawler lose to a young Scott Putski on a May 28 WWF Superstars dark match, as well as Vic Steamboat (wrestling as "Jesse Bolt") in another dark match at the July 29th WWF Superstars taping.

In August Lombardi traveled to Japan again as part of another joint WWF/SWS tour and teamed with Rick Martel. The following month saw Lombardi engage in his first feud since 1989, when he became part of a short angle with newcomer Big Bully Busick to determine who was the true bully of the WWF. On the October 28th edition of Prime Time Wrestling the Brawler defeated Busick by countout in what turned out to be the blowoff for the feud. Brawler defeated the Bully by countout and a rematch one week later saw the Brawler dominate the Bully until the latter's manager Harvey Wippleman (Lombardi's real life close friend) grabbed the Brawler's leg, leading to a controversial win for the Bully. The feud with Busick led to a quasi-face turn for Lombardi as he was then matched up against various heel opponents for the remainder of 1991.

Lombardi opened 1992 anchoring the dark match of yet another PPV, this time the 1992 Royal Rumble. He initially defeated Chris Walker with his feet on the ropes; afterwards WWF president Jack Tunney reversed the decision. Lombardi returned to heel status with his Brawler gimmick, matching up against numerous faces during the winter and spring such as Kerry Von Erich, Tatanka, and Big Bossman. Lombardi renewed his partnership with a returning Barry Horowitz on March 9 at a WWF Superstars taping, facing and losing to The Samoan Swat Team in the latter's tryout match. They teamed again in December against The Bushwhackers. He spent much of the spring and summer engaged in a house show series with Jim Powers, Jim Brunzell, Crush, and Tito Santana during which he was winless. He closed out 1992 on a lengthy losing streak to Jim Duggan.

Going into 1993 Lombardi was back where he had been prior to the Brawler gimmick – stuck as enhancement talent with no clear path upwards. And it was finally during this year, a decade into his tenure with the company that he went on his longest winning streak to date. Matched again versus Jim Powers in numerous house show matches, Lombardi put together an eight match winning streak in March and April. Later in the spring Lombardi defeated a young Scott Taylor in a tryout match in Sydney, Nova Scotia at a Wrestling Challenge taping. In the summer the Brawler was matched up against another young wrestler – The Predator (Mike Bollea), with Lombardi winning each match. He closed out the summer teaming with Blake Beverly and Little Louie against The Bushwhackers and Tiger Jackson, as well as defeating a young Tommy Dreamer at a WWF Superstars taping on August 17.

==== Various gimmicks (1993–1994) ====
Two weeks later, on August 31, Lombardi finally received a new gimmick – that of a baseball player seemingly modeled after The Furies from the movie The Warriors. At a WWF Superstars taping in Grand Rapids, MI he debuted with the new persona and defeated Reno Riggins, then did the same the following day at a Wrestling Challenge event. A month later, as "MVP", he made his first appearance on Monday Night Raw and participated in the 20-man battle royal to determine the champion for the vacated Intercontinental title. MVP was eliminated by Owen Hart. The following day at WWF Superstars he defeated Duane Gill, but at this point the WWF decided to shelve the gimmick and he was reassigned to temporarily play the role of Doink the Clown that had been vacated by Matt Borne.

Wrestling as Doink, he was winless against Bret Hart, 1-2-3 Kid, and Bam-Bam Bigelow. Still in the clown gimmick, Lombardi made his first appearance in the United States Wrestling Association on October 26 in Louisville, Kentucky. Teaming with Brian Christopher, the two defeated Jeff Jarrett and Tony Falk. He continued to play Doink until Ray Apollo assumed the gimmick. Following the 1993 Survivor Series, Lombardi wrestled under his fourth gimmick of the year. Unofficially restarting his partnership with Barry Horowitz, the duo competed as The Red and Black Knights (the Knights having been a Survivor Series team under Shawn Michaels, previously portrayed by Jeff Gaylord, Greg Valentine, and Horowitz). The Knights participated in several house show matches against The Smoking Gunns. A fifth gimmick was also used at points, as Lombardi portrayed Kim Chee (Kamala's handler) during his 1986–87 and 1992 stints with the WWF and briefly in 1993 as a singles wrestler after Kamala left him for the newly ordained Reverend Slick.

In November 1993, Lombardi also returned to his Brooklyn Brawler gimmick, but was winless in encounters with Diesel, Tatanka, and Bob Backlund. He made his first PPV appearance of the year, wrestling in the dark match at the Survivor Series and losing to Billy Gunn. Still, he ended 1993 having enjoyed more success than at any point in the decade, having garnered 23 wins. Over a decade into his tenure with the company, Lombardi now found himself as the longest-tenured active wrestler within the WWF. Having returned to the Brawler gimmick however he remained in his enhancement talent role. He again participated in another wrestler's debut, this time facing Bob Holly on the January 29th episode of WWF Superstars (Fayetteville, North Carolina). Lombardi earned yet another dark match at a PPV, this time at the 1994 Royal Rumble. However unlike previous appearances, he earned his first ever PPV victory by defeating long-time foe Jim Powers. This was his only victory for many months as he entered another long losing streak, falling to Bob Holly and Bob Backlund on numerous house show events.

The impending baseball shutdown of 1994 provided a window of opportunity for him, and on the July 16th episode of Monday Night RAW the WWF began hyping the impending debut of a new wrestler called Abe "Knuckleball" Schwartz. In early August as the 1994 Major League Baseball strike began, Lombardi made his return as Schwartz. Basically a renamed version of the MVP gimmick, Lombardi's face was painted to look like a baseball and he wore a jersey with the number 00. In addition, he was accompanied to the ring by a carnival-like version of "Take Me Out to the Ball Game." Later, the MVP name was used by Montel Vontavious Porter in 2006. On the August 15th edition of RAW he made his debut as Abe Schwartz, blaming the fans for the baseball strike. Although barely recognizable in the gimmick, Lombardi's career was little changed by the new persona. He continued to lose matches to Bob Holly, as well as dropping numerous contests to a young PJ Walker. Finally in late September he enjoyed his first win streak, defeating Louie Spicolli and PJ Walker on numerous house show matches on the West Coast. However the WWF pulled the plug on the gimmick again, and Lombardi returned once more to the Brooklyn Brawler persona.

==== Sporadic appearances (1995–1998) ====
Lombardi made his first PPV appearance of 1995 in the dark match of the Royal Rumble, facing Buck Quartermain. Wrestling now full-time as The Brooklyn Brawler, his career was seemingly devoid of momentum as he dropped matches to Lex Luger, Duke Droese, Man Mountain Rock, and Doink (Ray Apollo). For the first time in over a year, he resumed his partnership with Horowitz yet again and faced off against Tekno Team 2000 in their Monday Night Raw debut on May 16. They also lost to The Bushwhackers and The Smoking Gunns.

With the WWF cutting back touring that year, Lombardi's appearances became less frequent. He was now the last of the troupe of enhancement talent. He would also work in the independent circuit in New Jersey, Pennsylvania, Michigan, and Canada. This included when he won the NWA Michigan Heavyweight Championship when he defeated Gene Austin on June 20, 1998.

As the Brawler, he made a non-wrestling appearance on the January 1st episode of RAW to present the "Steve Lombardi Trophy" to the winners of the RAW Bowl. His appearances from this point forward became much more limited. However, on March 10 at a WWF Superstars taping in Corpus Christi he participated in the debut of perhaps the most famous of the wrestlers that he had helped usher into the company – Dwayne Johnson. This came over a decade after a young Lombardi had faced his father Rocky Johnson. Johnson later recalled the match in his autobiography; praising Lombardi as a stand-up wrestler. He wrestled only thirteen times that year, ending with matches against Sid and Bob Holly.

Although his appearances were now occasional, Lombardi enjoyed his biggest moment thirteen years into his WWF career. On the September 22 show at Madison Square Garden he unexpectedly won a 20-man battle royal to earn his first ever WWF World Title opportunity. On the following show on November 15, Lombardi received his shot. Coming out to Frank Sinatra's "New York, New York", he wrestled for 15 minutes against Shawn Michaels and dominated the world champion; however he finally lost after Chyna and HHH interfered. On December 15, he faced Mark Henry in a singles match, but lost by Submission. On January 12, 1998, when he lost a Monday Night RAW dark match to Bart Gunn, who was then billed briefly as "Black Bart". Still working in as The Brooklyn Brawler.

==== Semi-retirement and WWE departure (1998–2016) ====
Lombardi retired from full-time active competition and instead worked primarily as a road agent for the WWF. He still made occasional appearances in ring, and the first came at Fully Loaded: In Your House where he hugged Vince McMahon, Sgt. Slaughter, Pat Patterson and Gerald Brisco. His first match back he lost to Bob Holly on Shotgun Saturday Night episode October 3, 1998 (taped September 28, 1998).

With the Monday Night War in full-swing and business soaring for the company, Lombardi's activity picked up in 1999. He wrestled several times on a European tour in April 1999, facing Christian, X-Pac, and Al Snow. Lombardi wrestled his first televised match in two years when he appeared on the July 3rd edition of Shotgun Saturday Night in a match against WWF Hardcore Championship Al Snow. The referee in the match was former heel manager Harvey Wippleman, who prevented Snow from using weapons while allowing Lombardi to use outside objects instead. Snow successfully retained his title. The following month during the WWF referee strike storyline, Lombardi worked as a ref during a Sunday Night Heat match. He concluded 1999 with a Jakked appearance, tagging with Mideon in a losing effort to Taka Michinoku and Sho Funaki.

During this time he returned to the independents. Held the BCW Can-Am Television Champion in Lasalle, Ontario, holding the title for nearly five years from April 3, 1998 to March 6, 2003. Also won the BCW Can-Am Heavyweight Championship when he defeated Johnny Swinger on January 15, 2003. Then dropped the title to D'Lo Brown on March 6, 2003. He lost to Jimmy Snuka at Road Warrior Hawk Memorial Show in Birch Run, Michigan on November 1, 2003.

On the February 28, 2000 edition of Monday Night RAW The Rock said that he would become WWF World Champion at WrestleMania 2000. WWF World Champion HHH then said that since The Rock was no longer the #1 Contender, he would have to start at the very bottom and work his way up. HHH then booked a match between The Rock and The Brooklyn Brawler, which Rock won in under a minute. On the July 4th edition of Smackdown Lombardi gained his first victory in several years when he joined Taka Michinoku and Sho Funaki to face HHH in a 3 on 1 match. Lombardi pinned Helmsley after Chris Jericho interfered. Lombardi continued to be semi-active throughout 2000, wrestling in numerous house shows and facing Jerry Lawler for the first time at an event in New Haven, CT on August 9, 2000. He gained several more victories that year as well, defeating Joey Abs and Just Joe.

The surge of in-ring activity continued, as Lombardi began 2001 with a victory over The Goodfather on January 13, 2001, in Detroit, MI after Billy Gunn interfered. He wrestled several house show matches that winter, facing Al Snow, Crash Holly, and Rhyno. After appearing in numerous dark matches throughout his career, Lombardi finally wrestled during the live broadcast of a PPV when he once again appeared as Kamala's handler Kim Chee at WrestleMania X-Seven and competed in the gimmick battle royal.

After being inactive throughout the summer, Lombardi returned to the house show circuit to face Chuck Palumbo in October In November he was matched against MMA fighter Ron Waterman, who was working for the WWF at the time under a developmental deal. On November 26, Lombardi returned to television for the first time in over a year when he faced Perry Saturn on Jakked. He lost to the Big Show on December 30.

At this point Lombardi's in ring appearances became sporadic. After working a string of house show matches in January 2002, he was inactive for the entire year. In 2003 he participated in the APA Invitational Battle Royal at Vengeance in Denver, Colorado on July 27.

After being inactive during 2004, Lombardi returned on the April 18, 2005 edition of Monday Night RAW which was held at Madison Square Garden. He appeared in a segment where Jon Heidenreich read a poem devoted to The Brooklyn Brawler. In response Brawler dismissed the poem, disowned the city of Brooklyn, and declared himself "The Boston Brawler". They then fought backstage. As part of an angle on SmackDown!, he adopted the moniker of the "Boston Brawler", shedding his customary New York Yankees apparel in favor of Boston Red Sox clothing. This was done in response to the Red Sox' defeat of the Yankees in the 2004 American League Championship Series.

He reprised his role as Kim Chee, having apparently reconciled with Kamala, on the August 11, 2005, edition of SmackDown accompanying the Ugandan Giant to the ring for his match with Randy Orton. He also appeared with him on the June 26, 2006, episode for Kamala's match against Umaga.

In early 2006, he still worked behind the scenes of WWE, including behind the camera with John Cena on his WWE.com show "Five Questions". Cena often makes references to Lombardi, even jokingly calling him the greatest technical wrestler of all time. Also, his face popped up in front of Cena's mouth to censor curse words, usually saying "nu-uh" or "brawler". On the June 2, 2006, episode of Five Questions, Brawler showed his face. He even censored himself, saying "you are a piece of Brawler". In another episode of "Five Questions," Cena made the claim that Lombardi was actually born in Detroit, and not in Brooklyn, however this was later proven false (and likely a work). On May 7, 2006, WWE.com announced that, as part of Jakks Pacific's WWE Classic Superstars collection, they would be releasing a Brooklyn Brawler action figure. At Vengeance, Brawler appeared as Doink the Clown when he came out to the ring with Eugene during Eugene's match with Umaga. On August 1, 2006, Lombardi went to the ECW brand for a match against then ECW wrestler, Kurt Angle. Lombardi quickly lost when Angle applied an ankle lock on him. That same week, he appeared on SmackDown! against Vito, losing by submission. On the December 18 edition of Raw, Lombardi appeared in the 30 man battle royal as the Brooklyn Brawler.

On the 15th anniversary of Raw on December 10, 2007, Lombardi appeared as Abe "Knuckleball" Schwartz in a segment. When Triple H saw him, he exclaimed "I guess the Brooklyn Brawler was busy".

On the 10th anniversary of "Smackdown" on September 29, 2009, in Boston, Lombardi appeared as The Brooklyn Brawler in a backstage anniversary party along with numerous other wrestlers.

Lombardi made a return appearance in the November 15, 2010 "Raw Goes Old School" episode of Raw as the Brooklyn Brawler with Harvey Wippleman as his manager. He lost in a match against Ezekiel Jackson.

The Brooklyn Brawler made a surprise return to pay-per-view on December 16, 2012, at the TLC pay-per-view (which took place at the recently opened Barclays Center in Brooklyn), teaming with the Miz and Alberto Del Rio to defeat 3MB (Heath Slater, Drew McIntyre and Jinder Mahal). Brawler won the match for his team via submission with a Boston crab on Mahal.

At the July 15, 2013 Raw taping from Brooklyn, in a match taped for Superstars, Lombardi competed in a match almost thirty years after his debut. Wrestling as the Brawler, he was defeated by Ryback. In May 2016, Lombardi was released from WWE, thus ending Lombardi's 33-year career with WWE.

On January 22, 2018, Lombardi made an appearance at Raw 25 Years in a backstage segment with Kurt Angle.

=== Independent circuit (2016–2022) ===
After being released by the WWE, Lombardi returned to the independent circuit on June 25, 2016 when he defeated Eric Jayden at Legendary Action Wrestling in New York City. He lost to Jerry Lawler on August 27, 2016 at Northeast Wrestling in Wappingers Falls, New York. Then he lost to Kevin Nash at Big Time Wrestling in Poughkeepsie, New York on November 19, 2016. From 2016 to 2018, Lombardi worked for Michigan's Ultimate Championship Wrestling. On September 2, 2018, Lombardi as MVP and Mr. Anderson won BLW Tag Team Championship in Exeter, England defeating Chris Wlaker and Nick Riley.

His last match was on May 7, 2022, when he lost to Bushwhacker Luke at Independent Superstars Of Pro Wrestling in Morristown, New Jersey.

== Championships and accomplishments ==
- Allied Powers Wrestling Federation
  - APWF Television Championship (5 times)
- Big League Wrestling
  - BLW Tag Team Championship (1 time) - with Mr. Anderson
- Border City Wrestling
  - BCW Can-Am Heavyweight Championship (1 time)
  - BCW Can-Am Television Championship (1 time)
- International Wrestling Association
  - IWA United States Heavyweight Championship (3 times)
- NWA Michigan
  - NWA Michigan Heavyweight Championship (1 time)
- NWA Southwest
  - NWA Southwest Television Championship (4 times)
- Regional Championship Wrestling
  - RCW United States Tag Team Championship (3 times) – with Jay Love
- Total Professional Wrestling
  - TPW Light Heavyweight Championship (4 times)
  - TPW Tag Team Championship (5 times) – with Red Flair
- Wrecking Ball Wrestling
  - WBW Heavyweight Championship (2 times)
- World Wrestling Federation
  - Slammy Award (1 time)
    - Worst Idea (1994) Abe Knuckleball Schwartz on strike
