= Stevie Ray =

American professional wrestler (born 1958)

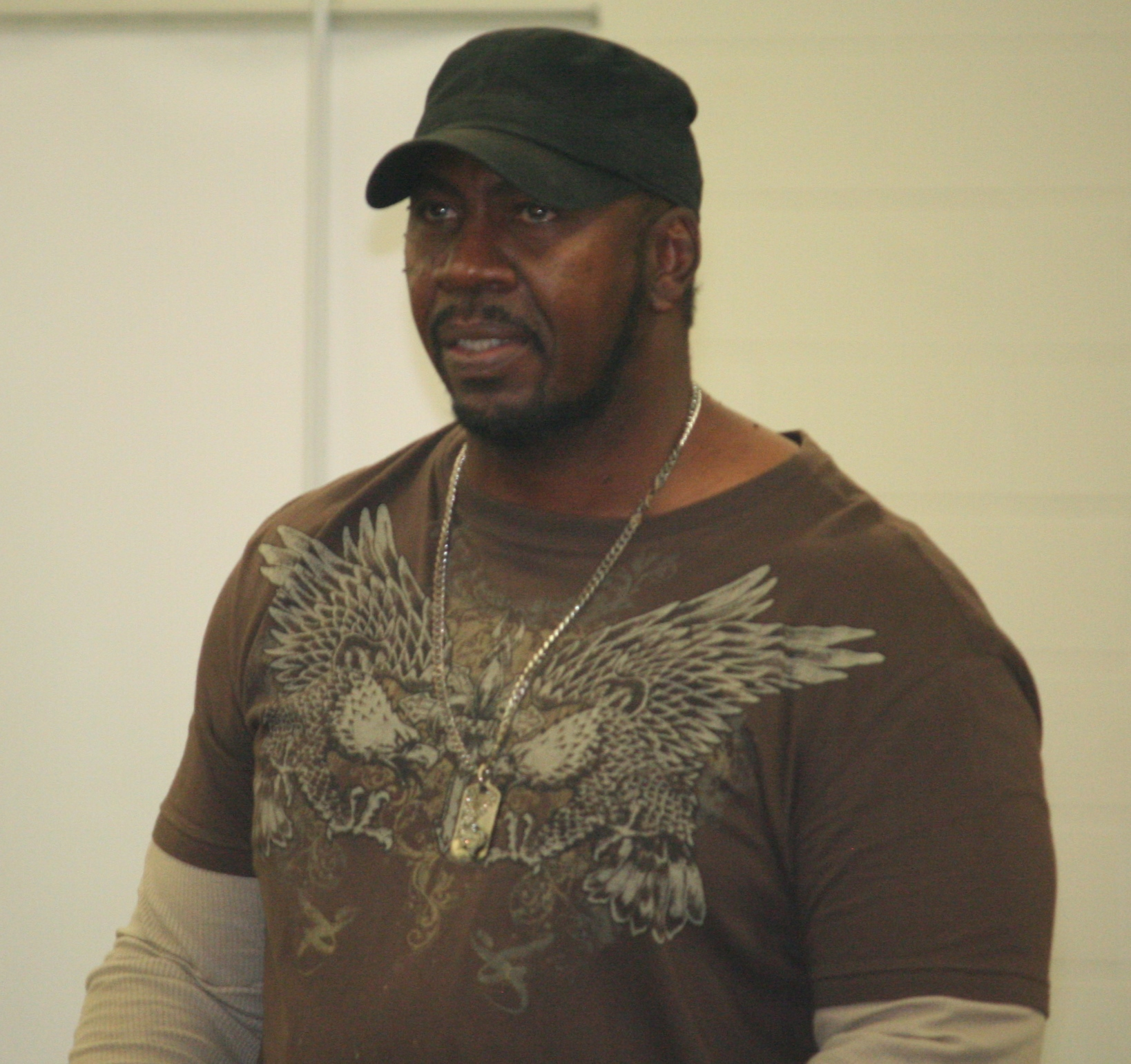
- Stevie Ray in 2015

Personal information
- Born: Laslon Steven Huffman; August 22, 1958 (age 67) New York City, U.S.
- Relatives: Booker T (brother); Sharmell (sister-in-law)

Professional wrestling career
- Ring name(s): Jive Soul Bro; Kane; The Masked Heel; Stevie Ray; Super Collider
- Billed height: 6 ft 5 in (196 cm)
- Billed weight: 292 lb (132 kg)
- Billed from: Houston, Texas
- Trained by: Scott Casey
- Debut: 1989
- Retired: 2017

Laslon "Lash" Steven Huffman (born August 22, 1958) is an American retired professional wrestler, better known by his ring name, Stevie Ray. Stevie Ray is best known for his seven-year tenure with World Championship Wrestling (WCW) from 1993 to 2000, where he was one-half of the tag team Harlem Heat, with his younger brother Booker T. Huffman, better known as Booker T. They won the WCW World Tag Team Championship a record ten times.

Huffman is also a one-time WCW World Television Champion. Among other events, he headlined the Fall Brawl 1993 and 1998 pay-per-views.

Huffman, as part of Harlem Heat, was inducted into the WWE Hall of Fame class of 2019.

== Professional wrestling career ==
=== Early career (1989–1993) ===
Laslon Huffman started wrestling in 1989 as Super Collider on the independent circuit in Texas. In Ivan Putski's Western Wrestling Alliance, he first started feuding with his brother, Booker (who was G.I. Bro at the time) under the ring name Jive Soul Bro. He began teaming with his brother as Stevie Ray (named after a combination of musical artists Stevie Wonder and Ray Charles) in a tag team called The Ebony Experience for the Global Wrestling Federation, which was on ESPN. They were faces and feuded with the "Blackbirds" of Iceman King Parsons and Brickhouse Brown. They won the GWF Tag Team Championship three times. Stevie Ray then went on to win the GWF North American Heavyweight Championship in 1993.

=== World Championship Wrestling (1993–2001) ===
==== Harlem Heat (1993–1997) ====
In August 1993, they went to World Championship Wrestling (WCW) and changed their team name to Harlem Heat. Initially Lash was known as Kane while Booker became Kole. They were then billed from Harlem. They became heels and were on Harley Race and Col. Rob Parker's team in the War Games at Fall Brawl on September 19, 1993, with Vader and Sid Vicious against Sting, Davey Boy Smith, Dustin Rhodes and The Shockmaster. They lost the match when Shockmaster forced Booker (Kole) to submit. In 1994, they got Sister Sherri as their manager and changed their names back to Booker T and Stevie Ray. They feuded with Stars and Stripes (The Patriot and Buff Bagwell) and won the WCW Tag Team Titles for the first time.

From there, they feuded with The Nasty Boys (Jerry Sags and Brian Knobs) and got into a feud with Col. Parker's "Stud Stable" of Dick Slater and Bunkhouse Buck where Parker and Sherri were carrying on a love affair. During this time, Stevie and Booker lost the titles to the Nasty Boys, regained them, then lost them to Slater and Buck and regained them again. They eventually gained Parker as a manager as he abandoned Slater and Buck to be with Sherri. Harlem Heat won the WCW World Tag Team Championship three times in 1995, trading the titles with the American Males (Bagwell and Scotty Riggs) in the early fall. They had brief feuds with Lex Luger and Sting, trading the titles back and forth in early 1996 and The Road Warriors before starting a long feud with Rick and Scott Steiner in 1996.

In October, they lost their titles to The Outsiders, Kevin Nash and Scott Hall, when Nash used Parker's cane to attack Stevie. They would then fire the Colonel, beat him up, turn face, and enter into a brief feud against Parker's newest team The Amazing French Canadians, a feud they would win. In 1997 they feuded with Public Enemy (Johnny Grunge and Rocco Rock), The Steiners and the New World Order. In the summer of 1997, they fired Sherri and added a new manager, Jacqueline. They were briefly put out of action by the nWo and returned to feud with The Faces of Fear (Meng and The Barbarian).

==== Singles appearances; New World Order (1998–1999) ====
As 1998 started to roll around, Stevie had to take some time off from WCW from January to June. Meanwhile, Booker T would go on to win the WCW World Television Championship. Through the association with his brother, he would gain his only singles title in WCW, as when Booker took time off with an injury as Television Champion from July to October, Stevie got a "power of attorney" to defend the belt for Booker. He then engaged in a short feud with Chavo Guerrero Jr. over the right to defend the belt before dropping it to Chris Jericho afterwards. By June 1998, Stevie Ray had returned to the ring, and the powerful gang-like faction of the nWo had been split into two: Hollywood Hogan's nWo Hollywood and Kevin Nash's nWo Wolfpac. Stevie Ray would be offered a spot in nWo Hollywood, but was hesitant at first. He would join the "black & white" in August, effectively turning him heel. Although this would make Stevie Ray known for using dirty tactics and a strength-in-numbers mentality, his brother, Booker, showed little resentment and respected Stevie Ray's decision to be a part of the nWo, and they were able to peacefully co-exist. Meanwhile, Booker was steadily gaining popularity as a face, climbing the ranks of the WCW roster and winning championship titles.

During his tenure with the nWo, Stevie Ray would tag team with the likes of Horace Hogan and Scott Norton as well as performing in singles competition, often with Vincent at ringside. Alongside Hollywood Hogan and Bret Hart, he also participated in the War Games of Fall Brawl 1998. The slapjack became known as Stevie Ray's trademark weapon which he would frequently use to knock an opponent unconscious, typically when the referee was distracted. By early 1999, both nWo factions had fused back together, but members of nWo Hollywood started bickering over who the leader of the sub-faction was. Hollywood Hogan began telling various members in private that he had granted them official leadership, causing confusion and friction between members. Not long after, Stevie Ray won the leadership role in a 4-man battle royal on the April 5, 1999, episode of WCW Monday Nitro, defeating Horace Hogan, Brian Adams, and Vincent.

==== Harlem Heat reformation and feud with Booker T (1999–2000) ====
As tension grew between members of nWo Hollywood, Stevie Ray started helping Booker T during his matches. As Booker was getting ganged up on in July, the two reunited Harlem Heat. They began feuding with Barry and Kendall Windham as well as The Jersey Triad of Diamond Dallas Page, Chris Kanyon and Bam Bam Bigelow. They went on to win the Tag Titles three more times, making them 10 time champions.

By late 1999, a female bodybuilder named Midnight had joined Harlem Heat. Stevie resented her help and started disputing with Booker over her. He eventually challenged Midnight in a match that would decide whether or not she would stay with Harlem Heat. After being defeated with a surprise small package, Stevie Ray would turn on both Booker and Midnight to form Harlem Heat, Inc. with Big T, Kash and J. Biggs. They won the rights to the Harlem Heat name in a match with Big T against Booker on February 20, 2000, at SuperBrawl X.

==== Color commentator (2000–2001) ====
In May, Stevie split from Big T, Kash and Biggs (who all left WCW) and helped Booker T out of a jam. He then retired from in-ring competition to become a color commentator for WCW Thunder. As a commentator, Stevie referred to all of the women as "yaks" and coined his catchphrase "Suckas gots to know!" He also provided in-depth analysis from a wrestler's point of view during matches and constantly criticized wrestlers for mistakes made in the ring. For example, he would often say that a wrestler "should have went [sic] for the cover!" or "needed to hook the leg!" and this advice earned him the nickname, "Straightshootin'" Stevie Ray. Stevie came back for one more WCW match (a title vs. career match) for the WCW World Heavyweight Championship against Scott Steiner on the November 27, 2000, edition of WCW Monday Nitro, which he lost. A few months later, WCW was bought by the WWF in March 2001. Stevie did not want to go to WWF.

=== World Wrestling All-Stars (2001–2002) ===
After WCW was bought by WWF, Stevie Ray wrestled a few matches for WWA against Jerry Lawler, and Buff Bagwell in 2001, and Ernest Miller in 2002, retiring later that year.

=== Semi-retirement (2005–2017) ===
In 2005, Stevie Ray and Booker T opened the "Booker T and Stevie Ray Pro Wrestling Academy" in Houston, Texas. In April 2013, Stevie Ray inducted Booker T into the WWE Hall of Fame. On February 21, 2015, Booker T and Stevie Ray reunited as Harlem Heat for one last match at Booker T's promotion, Reality of Wrestling's "The Final Heat" event, where they defeated the Heavenly Bodies for the ROW Tag Team Championship. On March 14, the titles were vacated. On May 16, 2015, Ray won the WildKat Heavyweight Championship defeating Shane Taylor. He dropped the title back to Taylor on November 14, 2015. In 2015 Ray was added to WWE 2K16 as DLC. On March 30, 2016, Stevie Ray debuted a new weekly radio talk show, Straight Shooting with Stevie Ray which airs on KCOH radio 92.9 FM HD2 every Wednesday. He is also the host of the podcast Stand Up for Greatness. Ray's last match was at Reality of Wrestling on August 12, 2017, teaming with Abel Andrew Jackson as they lost to Ernest Miller and Ryan Davidson.

== Championships and accomplishments ==
- Cauliflower Alley Club
  - Tag Team Award (2018) – with Booker T
- Global Wrestling Federation
  - GWF North American Heavyweight Championship (1 time)
  - GWF Tag Team Championship (3 times) – with Booker T
- Reality of Wrestling
  - ROW Tag Team Championship (1 time) – with Booker T
- Pro Wrestling Illustrated
  - Tag Team of the Year (1995, 1996) with Booker T
  - Ranked No. 67 of the 500 best singles wrestlers of the year in the PWI 500 in 1996
  - Ranked No. 248 of the 500 best singles wrestlers during the "PWI Years" in 2003
  - Ranked No. 62 of the 100 best tag teams of the "PWI Years" with Booker T in 2003
- WildKat Pro Wrestling
  - WPW Heavyweight Championship (1 time)
- World Championship Wrestling
  - WCW World Television Championship (1 time)
  - WCW World Tag Team Championship (10 times) – with Booker T
- WWE
  - WWE Hall of Fame (Class of 2019) – as a member of Harlem Heat

== Bibliography ==
- Lash Huffman. Shoot Interview with Stevie Ray (2006) (DVD).
