= Chris Walker (wrestler) =

American professional wrestler

Personal information
- Born: Glenn Coan; February 9, 1961 (age 65) Atlanta, Georgia, United States

Professional wrestling career
- Ring name(s): Chris Walker; Glynn Coon; Low Rider Hog; Wrestling Warrior
- Billed height: 6 ft 2 in (188 cm)
- Billed weight: 254 lb (115 kg)
- Debut: 1989
- Retired: 1999

Glenn Coan (born February 9, 1961), better known by the ring name "Conan" Chris Walker, is an American retired professional wrestler. Walker is best known for his time with the Global Wrestling Federation where he was one-half of the first GWF North American Tag Team Champions, along with Steve Simpson. He also formed notable tag teams with Curtis Thompson and Fabian. In his career, Walker also had brief stints with various wrestling promotions: Georgia All-Star Wrestling, Extreme Championship Wrestling, Smoky Mountain Wrestling, Southern States Wrestling and United States Wrestling Association. Additionally, he toured Europe with World Martial Arts Wrestling Federation and Japan with Super World Sports.

== Professional wrestling career ==
=== World Wrestling Federation (1990) ===
After completing training, Walker made his debut teaming with Butch Stanley in a tag-team match against The Powers of Pain on Jan 2, 1990. Walker was used as an enhancement talent, the match being taped in Birmingham, Alabama.

=== United States Wrestling Association (1991) ===
Walker received his first full-time stint when he joined the USWA a year later in February 1991. In his debut, he defeated Tom Prichard by DQ on February 4, 1991. A week later he began teaming with Curtis Thompson as "The US Males". On February 25, 1991, they defeated Brian Lee and The Eliminator. In May, the team broke up after Walker was injured and Curtis Thompson departed for WCW to become part of "the WCW Patriots".

=== Global Wrestling Federation (1991) ===
"Chris was a good looking, well built guy who could do a few things. He was pretty green when we had him in GWF, but he certainly had some up-side. For a muscular type guy, he could fly around a bit and had fairly good athletic skills. He really was the type that was being looked for by WWF at that time and I figured he'd end up there at some point. While he certainly was not the most technically skilled guy, he had enough potential to become proficient enough to be an effective babyface and I figured, once he reached that point, Vince would gobble him up.

I remember him being a nice guy who was very cooperative and didn't have a huge ego like some of the young muscle guys seemed to have. I don't know what happened to his career after he left GWF, but I was surprised he didn't at least get a shot at making a splash, but the thing is, in those days, you almost had to have accomplished something substantial elsewhere to get a good spot in WWF as opposed to the way they throw inexperienced and hardly ready for prime time guys in the mix today."

— Former GWF referee James Beard on Walker's post-GWF career

A month later Walker made his debut with the Global Wrestling Federation, a nascent promotion with an ESPN deal that had formed in the aftermath of the dissolution of World Class. Entering the GWF's Television Title tournament, the young wrestler competed barefoot and was dubbed "Conan" Chris Walker. He upset Doug Summers in the second round on June 28, 1991. As the tournament progressed over the next 24 hours, he would defeat Makhan Singh by disqualification and pin Rip Rogers. The Patriot defeated Walker in the finals to win the GWF Television Championship. In July he entered the GWF's North American Tag Team title tournament after forming a partnership with Steve Simpson. After winning four tournament matches, they defeated Rip Rogers and Scott Anthony on July 27 to win the tag-team championship, give Walker his first title. In November 1991, Walker jumped to the World Wrestling Federation and his partner subsequently lost the tag team title in a handicap match against The California Connection (John Tatum and Rod Price) later that month.

=== World Wrestling Federation (1991–1992) ===
On November 11, 1991, he made his return to the WWF and defeated Steve Lombardi in a dark match at a Prime Time Wrestling taping in Utica, NY. The following day he had another dark match at a WWF Superstars taping in New Haven, CT and pinned The Berzerker. He joined the company as a full-time member of the roster and embarked on their house show circuit immediately. Slotted as an opening card performer, he competed in multiple shows against Kato (Paul Diamond) and came out victorious on each occasion. On November 22, he received his first pinfall loss when he was pinned by The Berzerker. Towards the end of the month, he engaged in a house show series against Hercules and scored multiple upset victories over the long-time veteran. sig Walker made his television debut on the French version of WWF Superstars in January 1992, pinning Hercules. His American television debut would also take place that month when he appeared on the January 20th edition of Prime Time Wrestling and defeated The Brooklyn Brawler. On the house show circuit, he was less successful, falling to Skinner in multiple encounters. His first PPV appearance came at the 1992 Royal Rumble; albeit in a dark match. Wrestling The Brooklyn Brawler, Walker was initially defeated when his opponent's feet were on the ropes. WWF President Jack Tunney came out to reverse the decision. Although the intent by the WWF was to get a strong fan response in favor of the decision, the Albany, NY crowd instead booed him.

On the February 3rd edition of Prime Time, he suffered his first televised defeat, falling to The Warlord. He entered a house show series with the Warlord that month and continued his losing streak. Walker appeared again on the March 9th edition of Prime Time and lost to the Warlord once more. Unlike fellow recent signee Chris Chavis, Walker was never given a gimmick and his appearances remained confined to the house show circuit and Prime Time Wrestling as the WWF continued to mull over what direction to take him. Walker feuded with Kato on house show matches throughout March 1992. On the April 20th edition of Prime Time Wrestling Walker was defeated decisively by Sid Justice, in what would be the latter's final televised WWF match for almost three years. Walker was stretchered out after the conclusion of the match but reappeared the following week to defeat Barry Horowitz. Later in April, Walker participated in a series of joint Super World Sports / WWF, facing Samson Fuyuki, Haku, and Tetsuya Yamanaka. His final match came at a house show in Portland, ME on April 27, 1992, when he defeated Bob Bradley. He was then released from the WWF.

=== World Championship Wrestling (1993) ===
Walker appeared in World Championship Wrestling on February 5, 1993, at a house show in Huntsville, AL where he was defeated by Chris Benoit. Walker would then team with Van Hammer in a dark match against Vinnie Vegas and Big Sky on a March 19 taping of WCW Saturday Night. WCW then gave him the gimmick of "The Low Rider Hog". Wrestling under that name, he teamed with Mustafa Saed in a losing effort against Tom Zenk and Johnny Gunn on March 23 in a dark match at WCW Saturday Night.

=== Later career (1994–1999) ===
A year later Walker appeared in London. Competing now as "The Warrior", he wrestled The Iron Sheik to a draw on July 16, 1994. The same night, he teamed with Big Bully Busick in a losing effort against Demolition 2000 (Demolition Ax and Blast). On August 5, 1994, he joined Smoky Mountain Wrestling and defeated Richard Slinger, but left the promotion following SMW Night of Legends. Walker was originally brought in at the last minute to replace Jake "The Snake" Roberts when the former WWF star stopped showing up to events. It was planned for Walker to feud with then SMW Heavyweight Champion "Dirty White Boy" Tony Anthony, however, he was similarly released from the company after no-showing three shows. Walker's spot would subsequently go to Bruiser Bedlam.

After wrestling only twice in 1996, Walker resurfaced in Extreme Championship Wrestling at a house show in Marietta, GA on October 4, 1998, and was defeated by Bam Bam Bigelow.

Walker then joined Southern States Wrestling at the end of 1998 and became active once more. On March 13, 1999, he defeated Heinrich Franz Keller for the SSW International Cup in Kingsport, Tennessee.

On May 25, 1999, he returned to World Championship Wrestling and won a dark match against a preliminary opponent. He would then retire from wrestling.

== Championships and accomplishments ==
- Georgia All-Star Wrestling
  - GASW Tag Team Championship (1 time) – with Fabian
- Global Wrestling Federation
  - GWF North American Tag Team Championship (1 time) – with Steve Simpson
- Pro Wrestling Illustrated
  - Ranked No. 174 of the top 500 singles wrestlers in the PWI 500 in 1991
- Southern States Wrestling
  - SSW International Cup (1 time)
