= Ivan Putski =

Polish-American wrestler and bodybuilder (born 1941)

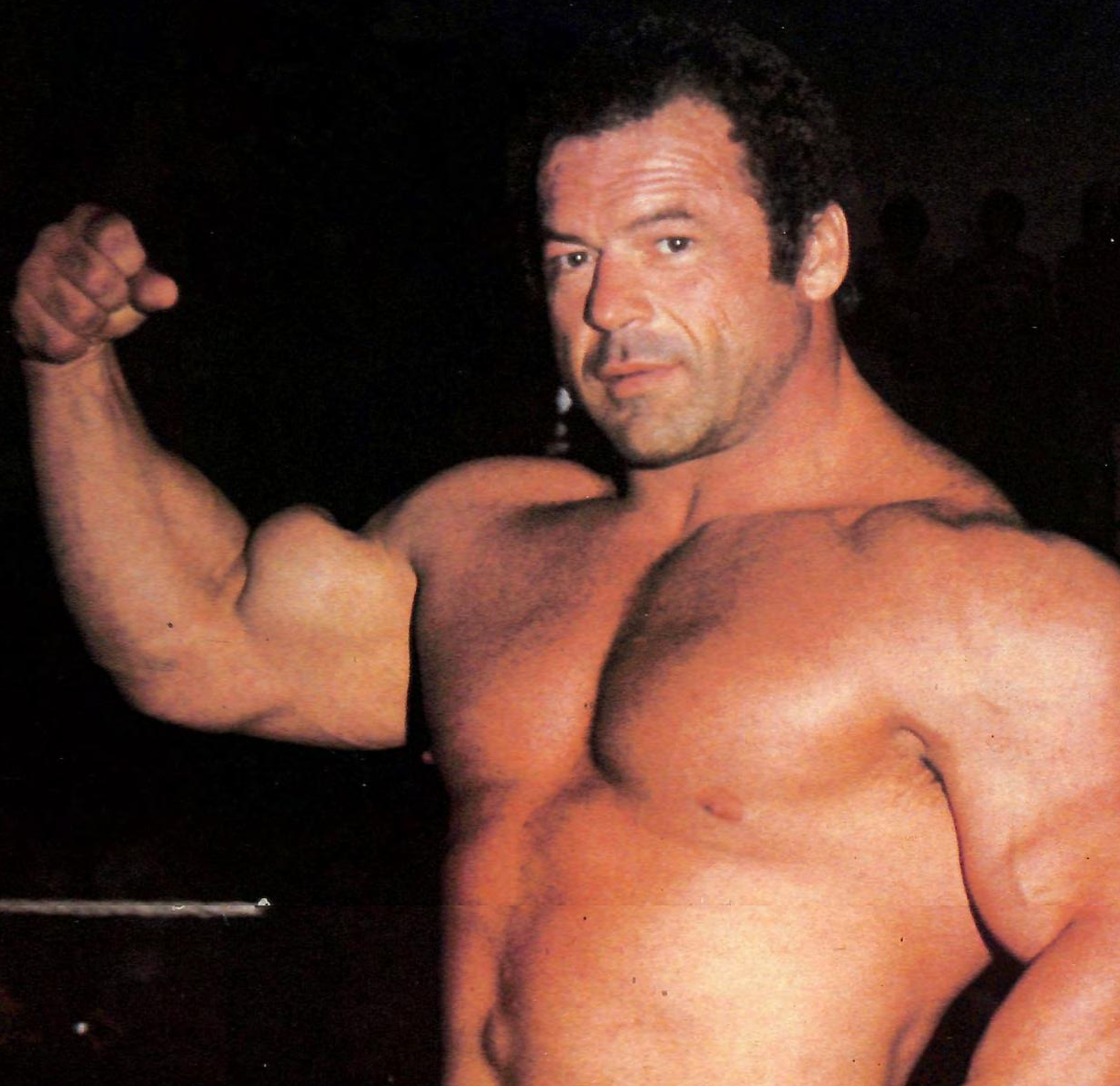
- Putski, c. 1982

Personal information
- Born: Józef Bednarski; January 21, 1941 (age 85) Kraków, Poland
- Children: 2, including Scott Putski

Professional wrestling career
- Ring name(s): Ivan Putski; Jim Bednarski; Polish Power; The Polish Hammer
- Billed height: 5 ft 10 in (178 cm)
- Billed weight: 245 lb (111 kg)
- Billed from: Kraków, Poland
- Debut: July 2, 1969
- Retired: February 27, 1999

Józef Bednarski (born January 21, 1941) is a Polish and American former professional wrestler and bodybuilder, best known by the ring name Ivan Putski. He was given the nicknames the "Polish Hammer" and "Polish Power".

Putski is a former WWF World Tag Team Champion with Tito Santana. He had a famous feud with Superstar Billy Graham over the WWF Championship, which led to many pose-downs, arm wrestling bouts, and long matches between the two. Other rivals included The Iron Sheik, Ivan Koloff, and Jesse Ventura, who would refer to Putski as "Puduski" when commentating for the WWF. Putski was the first Polish wrestler to perform in the WWF (now WWE).

He was inducted to the National Polish-American Sports Hall of Fame in 2025.

== Early life ==
Putski was born in Kraków in Poland and immigrated to the United States at a young age. He and his family arrived in Texas, where Putski began his professional wrestling career. In his earlier days, he was weighed in at the 250 lb mark.

== Professional wrestling ==
=== Early career (1969–1974) ===
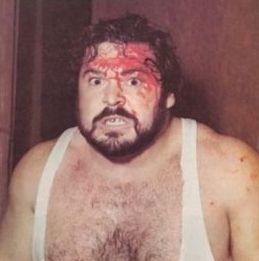
Putski in an AWA wrestling program, 1974

Putski won the NWA Texas Tag Team Championship with José Lothario twice in 1973.

Putski was a fixture on the Dallas-Ft. Worth wrestling scene and was one of its most popular personalities. He was routinely the feature act at the Sportatorium, a wrestling-only arena in an industrial section near Downtown Dallas. Putski's act consisted of being a happy-go-lucky, often aloof buffoon, who would "miraculously" pin his opponent. Putski was often introduced as a former concentration camp survivor, only adding to his sympathetic appeal to audiences of all ages.

In the early 1970s, Putski worked for the American Wrestling Association (AWA), where he was a fan favorite. It was during this time in the AWA that Putski also first clashed with Superstar Billy Graham, with the two feuding over who was the strongest wrestler in the AWA;. During "Polish Power" Ivan Putski's time in the AWA, anti-Polish phrases where also a mainstay of lead American television series All In The Family's patriarch Archie Bunker against his Polish-American son-in-law Michael Stivic.

Prior to leaving the AWA, Ivan dropped most of his weight by getting into bodybuilding. Ivan kept himself fairly trim at the 215–220 pound mark.

=== World Wide Wrestling Federation / World Wrestling Federation (1974–1987) ===
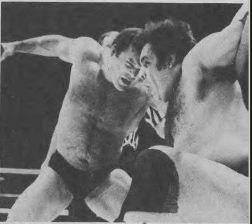
Putski striking King Kong Mosca during a match, c. 1982

Putski debuted in the World Wide Wrestling Federation (WWWF) in 1974. While in the WWWF, Putski feuded with many wrestlers, including Bruiser Brody, Stan Hansen and Ivan Koloff. On June 25, 1976, at Showdown at Shea, Putski defeated Baron Mikel Scicluna. Four years later on August 9, Putski was again victorious at the next Showdown at Shea, defeating Johnny Rodz. He also resumed his feud with Superstar Billy Graham. On October 22, 1979, Putski teamed with a young rookie Tito Santana to defeat Johnny and Jerry Valiant to win the WWF World Tag Team Championship. They held the title for six months before losing it to The Wild Samoans. Putski worked in the renamed World Wrestling Federation (WWF) in the 1980s, primarily feuding with Roddy Piper and Sgt. Slaughter. He took a hiatus from wrestling in 1986. He soon returned to the independent circuit, also making occasional appearances in the WWF as a jobber to the stars. His last high-profile feud was in 1984 with Jesse Ventura. In November 1985, Putski lost to Randy Savage in the opening round of the Wrestling Classic. His final appearance was in 1987 teaming on television with Junkyard Dog and Superstar Billy Graham in tag team matches.

=== Late career (1987–1999) ===
Putski began to slow down his career in the 1980s. He won his last tag team championship in May 1981, teaming with Wahoo McDaniel to defeat Dory Funk, Jr. and Larry Lane for the SWCW World Tag Team Championship. He worked for International World Class Championship Wrestling from 1986 to 1988. He then retired from the sport.

After his run in the WWF, several promotions, and his semi-retirement, Putski returned to the ring in 1991. Putski made an appearance for International World Class Championship Wrestling teaming with his son, Scott to defeat the Masked Iraqis. Also made an appearance for Global Wrestling Federation in 1992 teaming with Gary Young against Tom and Mike Davis in a no contest.

In 1995, Putski was inducted into the WWF Hall of Fame class of 1995 by his son, Scott.

In 1996, he joined International Championship Wrestling, as a face. He won several matches in the company, and he was billed as a tough guy.

The father-and-son team returned in July 1997 to defeat Jerry Lawler and Brian Christopher on Raw is War.

Putski wrestled his last match for NWA New Jersey as he defeated King Kong Bundy by disqualification on February 27, 1999.

After his retirement from wrestling, he had a strongman career. Putski occasionally made appearances in the ring during the years.

In 2010, Putski appeared in a reunion event called "LegendsMania" and he was interviewed.

== Other media ==
=== Video games ===
Video game appearances
Year	Title	Notes
2001	Legends of Wrestling	Video game debut
2002	Legends of Wrestling II	
2004	Showdown: Legends of Wrestling	

== Strongman career ==
Aside from wrestling, Ivan Putski also competed as a strongman. He participated in the 1978 World's Strongest Man competition, finishing eighth in a field of ten competitors.

== Personal life ==
Putski's son, Scott Putski, is also a professional wrestler, having previously worked at World Wrestling Federation and World Championship Wrestling.

From 2000 to 2007, Putski worked as head security guard at Jack C. Hays High School in Buda, Texas.

On January 8, 2012, Ivan Putski was inducted into the Cloverleaf Radio Hall of Fame, Class of 2012.

On June 26, 2025, he was inducted into the National Polish-American Sports Hall of Fame located in Troy, Michigan; Class of 2025.

== Championships and accomplishments ==
- Big Time Wrestling
  - NWA American Tag Team Championship (1 time) – with Jose Lothario
  - NWA Texas Tag Team Championship (2 times) – with Jose Lothario
- Pro Wrestling Illustrated
  - PWI Tag Team of the Year (1979) with Tito Santana
  - PWI ranked him #170 of the 500 best singles wrestlers during the "PWI Years" in 2003
  - PWI ranked him #92 of the 100 best teams of the "PWI Years" with Tito Santana in 2003
- Southwest Championship Wrestling
  - SCW Heavyweight Championship (1 time)
  - SCW World Tag Team Championship (1 time) – with Wahoo McDaniel
- Texas All-Star Wrestling
  - Texas 6 - Man Tag Team Championship (1 time) - with Big Bubba and Scott Casey
- World Wrestling Federation
  - WWF Tag Team Championship (1 time) – with Tito Santana
  - WWF Hall of Fame (Class of 1995)
- Wrestling Observer Newsletter
  - Readers' Least Favorite Wrestler (1984)
  - Worst Wrestler (1984)
