= Terry Daniels =

American retired professional wrestler

Personal information
- Born: Terry Daniels Redlands, CA, United States

Professional wrestling career
- Ring name(s): Terry Daniels; Pvt.Terry Daniels
- Billed height: 5 ft 8 in (173 cm)
- Billed weight: 223 lb (101 kg)
- Debut: August 31, 1978
- Retired: 2007

Terry Daniels is an American retired professional wrestler, best known for his time with World Wrestling Federation (WWF), under the ring name Private Terry Daniels. He appeared with the company as a jobber to the stars between 1983 and 1992. He initially competed for Mid-South Wrestling and Southwest Championship Wrestling in Texas.

== Professional wrestling career ==
Daniels made his debut in his home state in Texas in 1978 for MMP in Amarillo. He worked early in his career for Southwest Championship Wrestling.

In 1983, he made his debut in the World Wrestling Federation as Pvt. Terry Daniels. Daniels appeared on Piper's Pit on March 31, 1984, for the episode of WWF All-Star Wrestling. Then Daniels won a battle royal on June 10 winning $10,000 in Concord, New Hampshire. The battle royal featured Bob Backlund, Afa, and Tito Santana. Daniels managed victories over Rene Goulet, Johnny Valiant, Butcher Vachon, Samula, Larry Kean and other jobbers. He feuded with the Iron Sheik losing all matches. Faced against heels Big John Studd, Paul Orndorff, Greg Valentine, Jesse Ventura, and Nikolai Volkoff. He teamed up with Sgt. Slaughter that summer in 1984 as the Cobra Corps and they fought against Adrian Adonis and Dick Murdoch for the WWF Tag Team Championship at The Brawl to End It All in an unsuccessful attempt. Daniels left the WWF at the end of the year and went to Mid-South Wrestling.

Daniels continued working for Mid-South until 1986 before the promotion folded in 1987. He reunited with Sgt. Slaughter for a match at the Superdome against the Dirty White Boys (Len Denton and Tony Anthony) as Daniels and Slaughter won. Also worked for World Class Championship Wrestling in Dallas and the independents.

Daniels returned to the WWF in 1989 and in 1992.

In 1991, he worked for Global Wrestling Federation and United States Wrestling Association.

He retired from wrestling in 2007.

== Championships and accomplishments ==
- Pro Wrestling Illustrated
  - PWI ranked him # 351 of the 500 best singles wrestlers of the PWI 500 in 1991
  - PWI ranked him # 407 of the 500 best singles wrestlers of the PWI 500 in 1992
