= Marc Lowrance =

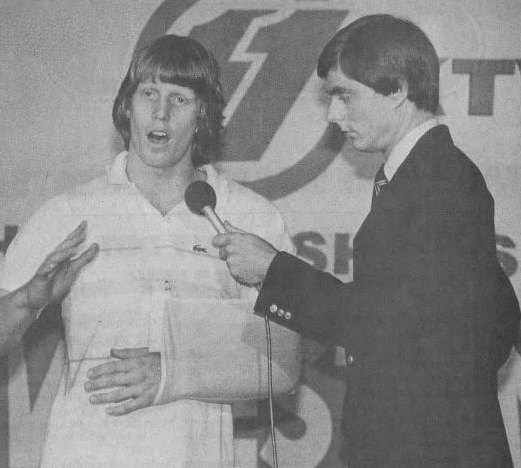
Lowrance (right) interviewing Mike Von Erich in 1985

Rev. Marc H Lowrance III, (July 5, 1959), is an American United Methodist minister who has previously worked as a former sports anchor and professional wrestling announcer, best known as one of the voices of World Class Championship Wrestling, a Dallas, Texas-based wrestling organization operated by Fritz Von Erich during the 1980s.

== Biography ==
=== Life in the ministry ===
In May 1990, Lowrance left pro wrestling to become a minister with a United Methodist church.
