= United States Wrestling Association =

American professional wrestling promotion

- Acronym: USWA
- Founded: 1989
- Defunct: November 1997
- Style: Rasslin'
- Headquarters: Memphis, Tennessee (1989–1997)
- Founder(s): Jerry Jarrett; Von Erich family
- Owner(s): Jerry Jarrett and Kevin Von Erich (1989–1990); Jerry Jarrett (1990–1995); Jerry Lawler (1995–1997); Larry Burton (1997)
- Predecessor: Continental Wrestling Association; World Class Championship Wrestling
- Successor: Unofficial: Power Pro Wrestling; Kick-Ass Wrestling; Memphis Championship Wrestling; Memphis Wrestling

The United States Wrestling Association (USWA) was a professional wrestling promotion based in Memphis, Tennessee. The company was founded when the Memphis-based Continental Wrestling Association merged with the Dallas-based World Class Championship Wrestling.

== History ==
=== Foundation ===
The USWA was founded as an attempt to create a fourth national promotion, alongside Jim Crockett Promotions/WCW, AWA and the WWF (now known as WWE). The USWA was created through a merger of the WCCW (from Texas) and the CWA (based in Memphis, Tennessee). It originally promoted shows, usually headlined by Jerry Lawler, in both Tennessee and Texas.

=== WCCW withdraws ===
The Dallas promotion (formerly WCCW), which was 40 percent owned by the Von Erich family, withdrew from the USWA in September 1990 due to a revenue dispute. According to Skandor Akbar, there were lawsuits involved, most notably when Jerry Jarrett was sued by Kevin Von Erich. That promotion reverted to the World Class name, but ceased operations two months later due to lack of revenue.

Jerry Jarrett and Jerry Lawler brought the USWA back to Texas, but only on a limited basis, while promoters Joe Pedicino, Max Andrews, and Boni Blackstone were getting the new Global Wrestling Federation ready for a spring 1991 debut at the Sportatorium. Several of the former World Class and USWA Dallas wrestlers joined the new GWF, while others from the old CWA remained with the USWA.

=== Talent exchange with the WWF ===
In 1992, the USWA began a talent exchange with the WWF, which saw Lawler sign on to Vince McMahon's federation, while several high-profile WWF stars appeared in the USWA. Dallas wrestler Gentleman Chris Adams spent a few months in the USWA in an angle involving Brian Christopher and Toni Adams, splitting his time between Memphis and Dallas' GWF during this time frame.

=== Struggling to stay relevant during the "Monday Night War" ===
The wrestling landscape changed in 1995 – the Monday Night War began, with WWF and WCW battling for cable television supremacy on Monday nights each and every week. As for the USWA, their biggest crowds came every Monday night at the Mid-South Coliseum in Memphis, Tennessee. With a growing wrestling viewership on Monday nights that could watch pay per view-quality wrestling matches for free on television, the live attendance at the marquee events for the USWA began to dwindle. A move to Thursday nights did not help what was becoming inevitable – the demise of the USWA.

=== Closure ===
A combination of a poor line up, sub-standard venue, lack of talent and holding the show on a Thursday night led to a show on October 3, 1996, drawing the smallest crowd in the history of Memphis wrestling: just 372 fans, paying $1,800, to the Big One Flea Market. The future of the promotion was being questioned, following the previous week's resignation of general manager Randy Hales. The Louisville and Nashville crowds had stayed consistent, but the Memphis crowds, which in the past had carried the promotion, had fallen over the past few months. In addition, the Big One (Flea Market) pavilion was less than inviting, the zigzag roof of its original owner (The Treasury Stores) causing its major leaking problem. The promotion quietly disbanded in November 1997.

== Major USWA cities ==
- Memphis, Tennessee
- Dallas, Texas
- Nashville, Tennessee
- Louisville, Kentucky
- Evansville, Indiana
- Jackson, Tennessee
- Jonesboro, Arkansas
- Tupelo, Mississippi

== Championships ==
- USWA Unified World Heavyweight Championship
- USWA World Tag Team Championship
- USWA Television Championship
- USWA Junior Heavyweight Championship
- USWA Middleweight Championship
- USWA Texas Heavyweight Championship
- USWA Southern Heavyweight Championship
- USWA Women's Championship

== Alumni ==
Deceased individuals are indicated with a dagger (†).

- Steve Keirn
- Stan Lane
- Curtis Thompson
- Sabu†
- Sapphire†
- Jim Cornette
- Rob Van Dam
- Lanny Poffo†
- Skandor Akbar†
- Doug Gilbert
- Mr. Hughes
- Jimmy Hart
- Jerry Lawler
- Dirty White Boy
- Mil Máscaras
- Dick Murdoch†
- King Cobra
- Scott Bowden†
- The Shadow
- Tony Williams
- Jo Jo Jackson
- Dog of War
- Bubba Fangman
- The Bounty Hunter
- Tessa
- Bill Dundee
- Big Business Brown†
- Brian Christopher†
- King Kong Bundy†
- The Spellbinder
- The Soultaker
- Ricky Morton
- Robert Gibson
- The Rock 'n' Roll Express
- Todd Champion
- Jeff Jarrett
- Master of Pain/The Punisher
- Tojo Yamamoto†
- Jimmy Valiant
- Butch Reed†
- Billy Jack Haynes
- Cactus Jack Manson
- Austin Idol
- Dustin Rhodes
- Kamala†
- Eddie Gilbert†
- Koko B. Ware
- Junkyard Dog†
- "Dr. Death" Steve Williams†
- Doug Basham
- The Tazmaniac
- Reggie B. Fine
- Judge Dread
- Michael St. John
- Nate the Rat
- Man of The 90s
- The Spider
- Khris Germany
- The Gravedigger
- Sgt. Victor
- Rock 'n' Roll Phantom
- Dave Brown
- Corey Maclin†
- J. C. Ice
- Nightmare Danny Davis
- Wolfie D
- Flex Kavana
- John Tatum
- The Dragon Master†
- Jeff Gaylord†
- Terry Funk†
- Chris Youngblood†
- Mark Youngblood
- Dutch Mantel
- Sid Vicious^{†}
- Tom Prichard
- Jimmy Del Ray†
- Pat Tanaka
- Bart Sawyer^{†}
- Paul Diamond
- Eric Embry
- Tommy Rich
- Gorgeous George III
- Buddy Landel†
- Chris Bullock
- Clyde Coleman
- Brian Lee
- Brickhouse Brown†
- Jesse James Armstrong
- Miss Texas
- The Harlem Knights
- Chris Adams†
- Toni Adams†
- Scotty Anthony
- Robert Fuller
- Ron Fuller
- Kerry Von Erich†
- Kevin Von Erich
- Spike Huber
- The Hornet
- Richard Lee
- Freezer Thompson
- Bruiser
- The Power Twins (Larry and David Power)
- The Barroom Brawlers
- The Gambler
- The Texas Hangmen
- Marty Jannetty
- The Masters of Terror
- Matt Borne†
- Eddie Marlin†
- The Harris Brothers
- Tracy Smothers†
- Cody Michaels
- Brad Armstrong†
- Jerry Lynn
- Downtown Bruno
- Steve Doll†
- Doomsday/Christmas Creature
- Jimmy Jack Funk
- Billy Travis†
- The Ninja Turtle (or Cowabunga II)†
- Chris Candido†
- Steve Austin
- Jeanie Clarke
- Rod Price
- The Phantoms
- The Snowman†
- William G. "Dutch" Nichols
- Joey Maggs†
- Leatherface†
- Flash Flanagan
- Candi Devine†
- Axl Rotten†
- Ian Rotten
- Scott Braddock
- Tekno Team 2000
- Brakkus
- Chris Champion†
- Reno Riggins
- Scott Studd
- Terry Gordy†
- Fantasia (wrestler)
- Rex King†
- New Jack†
- Pez Whatley†
- Johnny Hotbody
- Iceman King Parsons
- Jack Hammer
- Steven Dane†
- Chris Walker
- The War Machines
- The Phantoms
- Mr. Clyde
- Homeboy
- The King Killer
- The Star Chaser
- The Scorpions
- Bert Prentice†
- The Colorado Kid
- Mike Samples
- Shawn Venom
- Todd Morton
- Ric Hogan
- Tony Falk
- Gary Young
- John Paul
- "Mean" Mike Miller
- Awesome Kong
- Jim Florence
- Ronnie P. Gossett†
- Keith Eric
- Super Mario
- Jed Grundy†
- Angel of Death†
- The Sandman
- Moondog Fifi†
- Moondog Spike†
- Moondog Spot†
- Moondog Rex†
- Moondog Cujo†
- Moondog Splat
- Big Black Dog
- Lauren Davenport
- "Dirty White Girl" Kimberly
- The American Eagles
- Bear Man (Ed Swinger)

== Talent exchange wrestlers in USWA ==
Home promotion in parentheses

- Owen Hart† (WWF)
- Bret Hart (WWF)
- Mr. Perfect† (WWF)
- Razor Ramon† (WWF)
- Randy Savage† (WWF)
- Papa Shango (WWF)
- Kerry Von Erich† (WCCW)
- Chris Adams† (GWF and WCCW)
- Sensational Sherri† (WWF)
- Luna Vachon† (WWF)
- Bob Backlund (WWF)
- The Big Bossman† (WWF)
- The Steiner Brothers (WWF)
- Eli and Jacob Blu (WWF)
- Men on a Mission† (WWF)
- Eddie Gilbert† (GWF)
- Jim Cornette (SMW)
- Jesse James Armstrong (WWF)
- Mr. Hughes (WWF)
- Well Dunn† (WWF)
- Kamala† (WWF)
- Giant González† (WWF)
- The Headshrinkers (WWF)
- The Heavenly Bodies (WWF)
- Tommy Dreamer (ECW)
- Oscar (WWF)
- D'Lo Brown (WWF)
- Jeff Jarrett (WWF)
- Psycho Sid Vicious† (WWF)
- Jim Neidhart† (WWF)
- Mr. Fuji† (WWF)
- Skinner (WWF)
- Bob Holly (WWF)
- Crush† (WWF)
- Brian Pillman† (WWF)
- Tatanka (WWF)
- Money Inc. (WWF)
- Ahmed Johnson (WWF)
- Marty Jannetty (WWF)
- Beulah McGillicutty (ECW)
- The New Razor Ramon† (WWF)
- Vince McMahon (WWF)
- Koko B. Ware (WWF)
- Hacksaw Jim Duggan (WWF)
- Shawn Michaels (WWF)
- Sunny (WWF)
- Mankind (WWF)
- Doink the Clown† (WWF)
- Big Van Vader† (WCW and WWF)
- Lex Luger (WWF)
- Harvey Wippleman (WWF)
- Isaac Yankem/The New Diesel (WWF)
- Sgt. Slaughter (WWF)
- The Undertaker (WWF)
- The Rock 'n' Roll Express (SMW)
- The Godwinns (WWF)
- The Bushwhackers (WWF)
- The Bodydonnas (WWF)
- The Smoking Gunns (WWF)
- The Orient Express (professional wrestling) (WWF)
- The Quebecers (WWF)
- The Headbangers (WWF)
- Adam Bomb (WWF)
- Duke Droese (WWF)
- Bob Armstrong† (SMW)
- The Sandman (ECW)
- Steve Lombardi (WWF)
- Howard Finkel† (WWF)
- Jimmy Hart (WWF)
- Paul Bearer† (WWF)
- Barry Horowitz (WWF)
- 1-2-3 Kid (WWF)
- Justin Bradshaw (WWF)
- Bam Bam Bigelow† (WWF)
- Mark Henry (WWF)
