= Steve Simpson (wrestler) =

South African professional wrestler

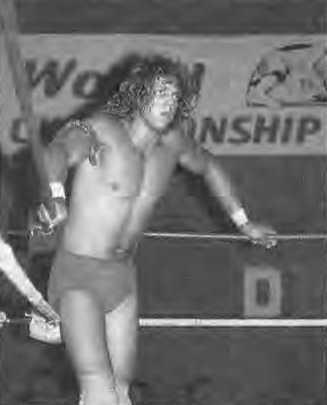
- Simpson, circa 1988

Personal information
- Born: 3 December 1963 (age 62) Johannesburg, South Africa

Professional wrestling career
- Ring name: Steve Simpson
- Billed height: 5 ft 11 in (180 cm)
- Billed weight: 227 lb (103 kg)
- Trained by: Sammy Cohen
- Debut: 1984
- Retired: 1998

Stephan Simpson (born 3 December 1963) is a South African former professional wrestler, better known by the ring name Steve Simpson.

== Professional wrestling career ==
Simpson is the son of wrestler Sammy Cohen. Sammy Cohen was the stage name for father Alec Simpson. Steve started wrestling in 1984 and achieved his first amount of stardom in the National Wrestling Alliance's Pacific Northwest territory. He was half of the S&S Express with Joe Savoldi and they captured the Tag Team Titles there. Steve Simpson also worked for the World Wrestling Council in Puerto Rico.

In 1986, Steve went to World Class Championship Wrestling where he became an ally of the Von Erich family in their war with the Fabulous Freebirds. He was joined by his brother, Shaun Simpson, in 1987 and they formed a tag team that won the Tag Team titles. Their biggest feud was against John Tatum and Jack Victory. They also had a brother Stuart who briefly wrestled in WCCW with them.

They left WCCW in late 1989 to wrestle in South Africa but Steve returned in 1991 to wrestle in the newly formed Global Wrestling Federation in Texas. His manager at the time was Percy Pringle III. He formed a tag team with Chris Walker and they became the first champions after winning a tournament over Rip Rogers and Scott Anthony, who were members of the heel stable The Cartel. In 1993, he worked in Japan for Wing and Network of Wrestling. In 1994, Simpson went back to wrestle in South Africa and retired in 1998.

== Championships and accomplishments ==
- Global Wrestling Federation
  - GWF Tag Team Championship (1 time) - with Chris Walker
  - GWF Tag Team Championship Tournament (1991) - with Chris Walker
- Interworld Wrestling Promotions
  - World Mid-Heavyweight Title (1 time)
- Pacific Northwest Wrestling
  - NWA Pacific Northwest Tag Team Championship (1 time) - with Joe Savoldi
- World Class Wrestling Association
  - WCWA Television Championship (1 time)
  - WCWA Texas Tag Team Championship (3 times) - with Shaun Simpson
  - WCWA World Six-Man Tag Team Championship (1 time) - with Chris Adams and Kevin Von Erich
  - WCWA World Tag Team Championship (1 time) - with Shaun Simpson
