= John Tatum (wrestler) =

American retired professional wrestler (born 1959)

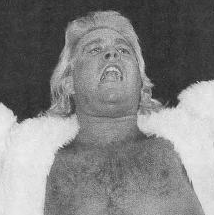
- Tatum, circa 1986

Personal information
- Born: John Frenkel III; July 18, 1959 (age 67) Mobile, Alabama, U.S.

Professional wrestling career
- Ring name(s): Franklin Hayes; John Tatum
- Billed height: 6 ft 2 in (1.88 m)
- Billed weight: 233 lb (106 kg)
- Billed from: Los Angeles, California
- Trained by: Michael Hayes
- Debut: 1983
- Retired: 1995

John Frenkel III (born July 18, 1959) is an American retired professional wrestler, better known by his ring name, "Hollywood" John Tatum. Tatum is best known for his appearances with the Texas-based promotion World Class Championship Wrestling in the 1980s.

== Early life ==
Frenkel was born in Mobile, Alabama, but was raised in Pensacola, Florida. He was a childhood friend of wrestlers Robert Gibson, Percy Pringle and Michael Hayes.

== Professional wrestling career ==
=== Early career (1983) ===
Frenkel was trained to wrestle by Michael Hayes, debuting in 1983. He initially performed under the ring name "Franklin Hayes", the storyline cousin of Michael Hayes. Tatum wrestled on the independent circuit before being recruited by the Charlotte, North Carolina–based Jim Crockett Promotions. During the early days of his career, Tatum began a relationship with Missy Hyatt.

=== World Class Championship Wrestling (1983–1986) ===
Tatum was recruited to the Texas-based World Class Championship Wrestling promotion by his friend Rick Hazzard. Hyatt came with him to Texas and eventually became his valet.

In 1986, Tatum began a feud with Chris Adams, mocking him for being temporarily "blinded" (in reality, Adams wore an eye patch over his left eye while involved in a separate feud with Gino Hernandez earlier in the year). After the feud with Adams ended, he and Hyatt would feud with Scott Casey and his valet Sunshine, which resulted in several cat fights between Hyatt and Sunshine.

=== Universal Wrestling Federation (1986–1987) ===
Leaving WCCW in May 1986, Tatum and Hyatt joined Bill Watts' Universal Wrestling Federation and teamed with Jack Victory, named “Flamboyant Ones”, against The Fantastics (Bobby Fulton and Tommy Rogers), before eventually joining Eddie Gilbert's stable "Hot Stuff Inc." (later renamed "Hyatt & Hot Stuff International").

In 1987, Tatum and Hyatt began a storyline in which Tatum lost a "Valet For A Day Match" to The Missing Link after interference by Gilbert (on behalf of Tatum). Shortly thereafter, Tatum began feuding with Gilbert with Hyatt siding with Gilbert after hitting him from behind with a "loaded" Gucci handbag (considered to be one of the more unusual "heel turns" in wrestling at the time). However, as a result of a real-life affair between Hyatt and Gilbert, Tatum left the promotion with Jack Victory at the end of year.

=== World Class Championship Wrestling (1987–1990) ===
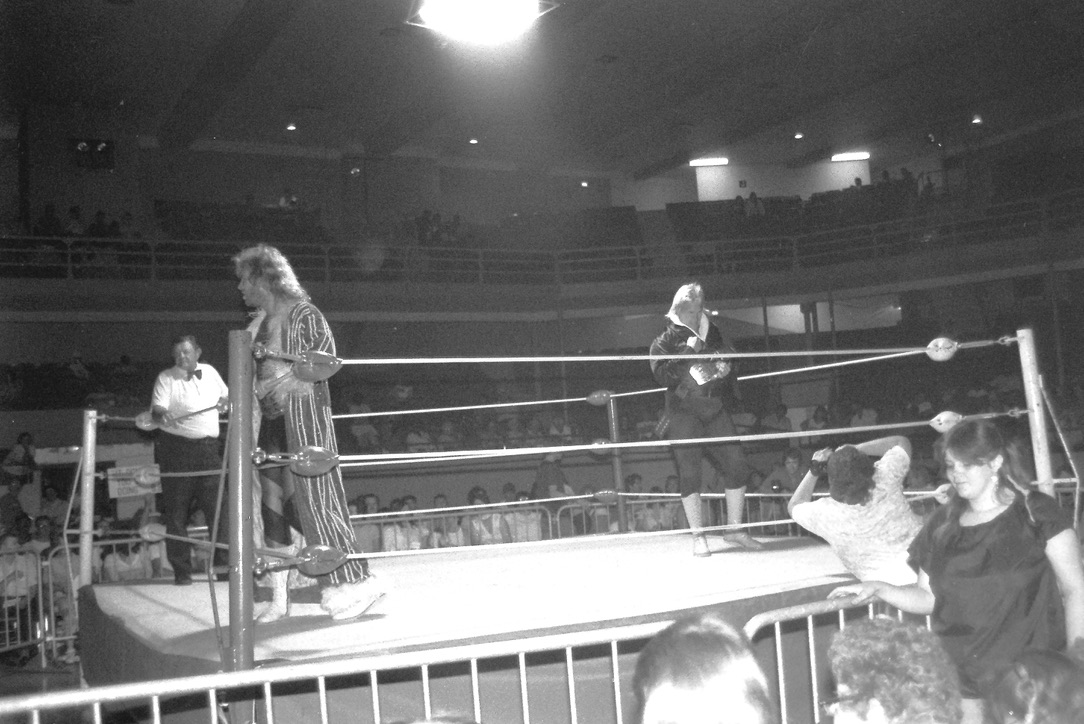
Tatum and Jack Victory in 1988

Returning to Dallas in December 1987, Tatum and Victory feuded over the World Class Wrestling Association Texas Tag Team and Wild West Wrestling Tag Team Championships with Steve and Shaun Simpson during the next year.

=== United States Wrestling Association (1990–1991) ===
In 1990, Tatum wrestled in the United States Wrestling Association. He was involved in a brief angle with Kevin Von Erich in the Texas end of the USWA and later began an angle involving Bill Dundee both in Dallas and Memphis. Tatum introduced a new valet, known as "Tessa". However, unlike Missy Hyatt, Tessa was reluctant to interfere in his matches; and eventually she became a babyface manager, very similar to Sunshine. In addition, Tatum began using a thrust kick (similar to Chris Adams' superkick), which he called the California Kick.

Tatum drew huge controversy in a July 6, 1990, match at the Dallas Sportatorium, whereas Tatum was slapped by Tessa, who became Dundee's valet. As Tessa turned away, Tatum knocked her unconscious with a superkick, resulting in her being carried out of the Sportatorium on a stretcher. This incident and another controversial incident involving Steve Austin and Toni Adams (which led to Toni also being carried out on a stretcher), resulted in several TV stations cancelling its USWA broadcasts.

=== Global Wrestling Federation (1991–1993) ===
In 1991, Tatum reunited with Rod Price as the "California Connection" / the "Coast to Coast. Connection" in the Global Wrestling Federation winning the GWF Tag Team Championship twice and competed in the GWF North American Heavyweight Championship tournament, before leaving the promotion in November 1993. During his stint in the GWF, Tatum founded his own promotion in Dallas called Big D Pro Wrestling. In June 1992, Tatum replaced Skandor Akbar as booker, until being replaced by Gary Hart a month later.

== Retirement ==
After leaving the GWF, Tatum continued wrestling on the Texas independent circuit for two years until his retirement in 1995 to take over his family's business at the Pensacola Interstate Fair in Pensacola, Florida.

== Personal life ==
On November 26, 1986, Tatum was involved in a head-on car accident. The driver of the other vehicle died, while Tatum suffered various injuries and was charged with drug possession. John's passenger was his girlfriend, who suffered permanent injuries from the incident.

On July 12, 2019, it was announced that Tatum had suffered multiple heart attacks.

== Championships and accomplishments ==
- Big D Pro Wrestling
  - Big D Heavyweight Championship (1 time)
  - Big D Tag Team Championship (2 times) – with Gary Young (1 time) and Rod Price (1 time)
- Global Wrestling Federation
  - GWF Tag Team Championship (2 times) – with Rod Price
- Pro Wrestling Illustrated
  - PWI ranked him #407 of the 500 best singles wrestlers of the PWI Years in 2003
- Universal Wrestling Federation
  - UWF World Tag Team Championship (1 time) – with Jack Victory
- Wild West Wrestling
  - WWW Tag Team Championship (2 times) – with Jack Victory
- World Class Championship Wrestling/World Class Wrestling Association
  - CWA Southwestern Heavyweight Championship (3 times)
  - WCWA Texas Tag Team Championship (4 times) – with Jack Victory (3 times) and Jimmy Jack Funk (1 time)
  - WCCW Television Championship (1 time)
