= Rod Price (wrestler) =

American professional wrestler (born 1962)

Personal information
- Born: Rodney Price; January 25, 1962 (age 64) Los Angeles, California, U.S.

Professional wrestling career
- Ring name(s): Rod Price; California Stud
- Billed height: 6 ft 0 in (1.83 m)
- Billed weight: 275 lb (125 kg; 19.6 st)
- Trained by: Red Bastien
- Debut: 1988
- Retired: 2010

Rodney Price (born January 25, 1962) is an American retired professional wrestler and manager. He is best known for his appearances in the Texas-based promotions Global Wrestling Federation, the Memphis-based promotion United States Wrestling Association and Extreme Championship Wrestling in the 1990s under the ring name Rod Price.

== Early life ==
He played in the National Football League for the Los Angeles Raiders and San Diego Chargers from 1985 to 1987.

== Professional wrestling career ==
Stud made his professional wrestling debut in 1988. In 1990, Price worked in the Dallas, Texas-based promotion World Class Championship Wrestling during the promotion's final days. After WCCW, Price worked in Memphis for the United States Wrestling Association. He began to team with Steve Austin. In Puerto Rico, he won the WWC Caribbean Heavyweight Championship defeating Super Medico #3 holding it for a week. He would drop the title to Super Medico #3.

In 1991, Price made his debut in the newly Global Wrestling Federation based in Dallas. Price and John Tatum formed the "California Connection" / the "Coast to Coast Connection" winning the GWF Tag Team Championship twice He won the GWF North American Heavyweight Championship three times. During a match against Chris Adams, Price got his hairpiece ripped off by Adams. Then Price began to bleed all over the ring. Price says that people sometimes laugh about that incident but he ended up getting over 200 stitches in his head as a result of it. Price worked for Global Wrestling Federation until it folded in September 1994.

From 1993 to 1994, Price worked in Japan's Network Of Wrestling.

After GWF, Price worked in the independent circuit in NWA Dallas where he feuded with Sam Houston (wrestler) in early 1995. Later that year he worked in Germany's Catch Wrestling Association. In 1996, he returned to Japan for Super Professional Wrestling Federation until 1997.

Price worked a dark match for Monday Night Raw on January 20, 1997, losing to Dwayne "The Rock" Johnson.

On May 1, 1998, Price won the NWA Texas Heavyweight Championship defeating Action Jackson in a tournament final. He was stripped of the title on June 28 after he refused to pay a fine.

In September 1998, Price made his debut in ECW. He would fight against Tommy Dreamer, New Jack, Taz, Lance Storm, Rob Van Dam and Mike Awesome. Price won a couple matches against Tommy Dreamer. Price competed against Nova at CyberSlam (1999). Skull Von Crush interfered in the match by attacking Nova on behalf of Price and then Nova's tag team partner Chris Chetti also got involved, making it a tag team match. Nova and Chetti nailed a Tidal Wave to Price for the win. After the match, Crush attacked Price with a jumping DDT. He became a member of the Da Baldies, a heel stable composed of wrestlers who were all bald. He left ECW in November 1999.

After ECW, Price returned to the independents until retiring from wrestling in 2010.

== Championships and accomplishments ==
- Big D Pro Wrestling
  - Big D Tag Team Championship (2 times) – with John Tatum (1 time)
- Continental Wrestling Alliance
  - CWA Heavyweight Championship (1 time)
- Global Wrestling Federation
  - GWF Tag Team Championship (2 times) – with John Tatum
- NWA Southwest
  - NWA Texas Heavyweight Championship (1 time)
- Texas Wrestling Federation
  - TWA Tag Team Championship (1 time) – with Steve Austin
- World Class II: The Next Generation
  - World Class II Texas Brass Knuckles Championship
- World Wrestling Council
  - WWC Caribbean Heavyweight Championship (1 time)
