= Global Wrestling Federation =

American professional wrestling promotion

- Acronym: GWF
- Founded: June 1991
- Defunct: September 1994
- Style: American wrestling
- Headquarters: Dallas, Texas
- Founder(s): Max Andrews; Joe Pedicino
- Owner(s): Max Andrews (1991–1994); Joe Pedicino (1991–1992); Northstar Promotions (1992–1994); WWE (2013–present)

Global Wrestling Federation was an American professional wrestling promotion based in Dallas, Texas. It started in June 1991 and folded in September 1994. At one time its shows were presented on the ESPN television network. Often the promotion provided programming five days a week, airing at 4 p.m. Eastern.

The GWF was the last pro wrestling promotion to be seen on ESPN regularly. Beginning in the mid-1990s, the network began to emphasize talk shows in the mid-afternoon hours, supplanting pro wrestling.

It was announced that ESPN Classic would start showing re-runs on August 5, 2013. Episodes were available on the WWE Network.

== History ==
Max Andrews and Joe Pedicino were the original GWF promoters. The kayfabe reason for the promotion creation established on the first episode of GWF of ESPN noted that the promotion was the USWA becoming "globalized" putting over talent such as the British Axl Rotten and Rasta the "Voodoo Man." The organization was a mix of established names and newcomers, many of whom would launch their national careers after appearances on the daily ESPN show. The original stars included the Patriot (Del Wilkes), Scott Levy (Raven of ECW, WCW, WWE and TNA), the Handsome Stranger (Marcus Bagwell of WCW) and Cactus Jack. In late 1991, "Hot Stuff" Eddie Gilbert entered the promotion and took over much of the creative direction of the show introducing The Dark Patriot (an evil version of the Patriot played by his brother, Doug Gilbert), John Hawk (John Bradshaw Layfield), Jerry Lynn, and the Winner Barry Horowitz (a character created by Gilbert and announcer Craig Johnson). Booker T and Stevie Ray also wrestled in the promotion as did the Lightning Kid (later known as the 1-2-3 Kid, Syxx, and X-Pac in WCW and WWE).

=== Weekly shows from "The GlobalDome" ===
The GWF began airing weekly shows in the local Dallas and Fort Worth metroplex television market from the Dallas Sportatorium, which was billed for a short time as The GlobalDome. Although their main weekly show's name was Major League Wrestling (not to be confused with the future promotion of the same name), as it was often referred to as, the GWF had also used other names for it, such as Supercard (also used by the USWA at one point) and Main Events. The promotion's announcers were Jon Horton (as Craig Johnson), Scott Hudson, Steven Prazak (as "Steven DeTruth"), and Joe Pedicino, with Boni Blackstone as ringside interviewer. Scott Hudson left the announcer's table and in his place was "The Expert" Bruce Prichard (Brother Love of WWF/WWE). In one storyline, Prichard and Horton argued in an expletive filled exchange only to reveal that Prichard was orchestrating many of the nefarious activities of the heels.

=== The Cartel ===
The Cartel was the first stable formed in the GWF and was the top heel stable in 1991. It consisted of Cactus Jack, Scotty Anthony, Rip Rogers and Makhan Singh. They feuded with the top baby-faces at the time in Steve Simpson, Chris Walker and the Patriot. They never won any titles but their presence was always felt at each event. Rogers was the spokesperson for the group and did most of their interviews, but Foley and Levy were allowed to shine occasionally on the mic. They talked of having a "boss" but would not name him. After a few months of this, they named the boss as GWF Commissioner Max Andrews and then the stable disbanded.

=== Broadcast innovations ===
The original GWF was notable for many of its wrestling broadcast innovations, most importantly, the acknowledgement of other promotions within the broadcast (including past promotions such as World Class Championship Wrestling). Competitors' former championships were mentioned, as were departures of wrestlers to other promotions. The promotion also aired behind-the-scenes footage and news segments with features from around the sport.

=== Massive cutbacks in budget ===
Following a massive cutback of budget, Pedicino and Johnson left the promotion.

Due to a pay dispute, booker Eddie Gilbert and his brother Doug (working under a mask as the Dark Patriot), left the GWF in 1992. Eddie Gilbert took with him the GWF North American Heavyweight Championship belt. He made a few defenses of the title in the United States Wrestling Association as the GWF World Heavyweight champion, despite being stripped of the belt and not being recognized as such by the GWF.

=== Northstar Promotions and WCCW alumni arrive ===
In the wake of this temporary fold, the promotional rights to the GWF were purchased by Northstar Promotions, which was formed by Grey Pierson, Robert Keeler, and Wayne Whitworth. Soon after, many former World Class Championship Wrestling stars began appearing, including Chris Adams, Kerry Von Erich and Iceman Parsons, among others. Doyle King, David Webb, and other guest announcers (including former World Class announcers Bill Mercer and Marc Lowrance) were brought in as the show became more of a theatrical presentation. Mercer, a veteran of Sportatorium wrestling since the 1950s, hosted a weekly segment on many memorable events that took place in the venerable Dallas arena. In late 1992, shortly after the Bungee Match, Keeler and Whitworth left Northstar and Pierson took the reins.

Local television shows reported that it was being aired over a fictitious global television network as Northstar introduced a large variety of characters. In a notable angle, GWF hired a "psychiatrist" for the wrestlers, played by Dr. Allan Saxe, a political science professor at the nearby University of Texas at Arlington.

One angle at that time included the world's first "Bungee" match in which Steven Dane wrestled against Chaz Taylor 150 feet in the air in a cage. The winner was Chaz Taylor who knocked Steven Dane out of the cage. After the match, "Maniac" Mike Davis attached himself to the bungee cord and was launched into the night sky. When he landed back on the ground, he claimed he had launched himself to the Moon and had returned to Earth with a "Moon rock." Another angle in which announcer David Webb, having "amnesia" following an attack by Manny Fernandez, believed that he was Elvis Presley (who performed at the Sportatorium in the late-1950s during the Big D Jamboree days). Another storyline involved Cecil Fielder, who was billed as the first two sport athlete in baseball and wrestling. He didn't wrestle; he was "observing" other wrestlers.

The GWF was shown weekdays on ESPN as well as a one-hour weekly syndicated show presented in 130 markets. One of the main reasons Northstar was successful was the separately edited and broadcast weekly syndicated show for the Dallas market which eliminated the two-week lag time between taping and airing. This allowed the Dallas audience to see the matches live on Friday night and view them 24 hours later on the local Dallas station. The local attendance rose from a low of 94 people to a packed house of over 5,000 within six weeks.

=== 1992 lawsuit by the World Wrestling Federation ===
In 1992, the Global Wrestling Federation was sued by then World Wrestling Federation (WWF), because they felt the use of the word "global" was too close to the word "world."

=== Kerry Von Erich tribute show ===
In February 1993, a memorial wrestling card was held in memory of Kerry Von Erich, who committed suicide on February 18. Von Erich was to have faced the Angel of Death, David Sheldon, that day. Instead, a memorial service was held at the Sportatorium prior to the matches, with former World Class announcer Marc Lowrance making a special appearance to pay his tributes to Kerry (Lowrance was the ring announcer who called Von Erich's NWA World title victory over Ric Flair in 1984). The following April, a memorial tribute card was held at the Dallas Sportatorium, featuring many former World Class wrestlers, referees and other officials. In that card, the main event was the official last match between the Freebirds and the Von Erichs. Kevin Von Erich and Chris Adams (who wore Kerry's ring jacket in his memory) faced Michael Hayes and Buddy Roberts, with Skandor Akbar in Hayes and Roberts' corner, and Fritz Von Erich in Chris and Kevin's corner (his last appearance in a professional wrestling match). The match ended with Kevin applying the claw on Roberts for the win, while Fritz applied the iron claw on Skandor Akbar. Adams meanwhile was ganged up by Hayes and Rod Price when David Sheldon came in to save Adams. Sid Vicious and Booker T also competed on the memorial card. Ultimate Warrior, who competed in Dallas as The Dingo Warrior, was scheduled to wrestle, but no-showed.

Bill Mercer, Marc Lowrance, David Manning and Bronco Lubich were among the many WCCW officials and personalities who appeared on the memorial card. Manning officiated Kerry's 1984 NWA World title-clinching match against Ric Flair at Texas Stadium nearly nine years earlier.

Proceeds of this card went to a trust fund established for Kerry's daughters Hollie Adkisson and Lacey Adkisson (who is now a model and third-generation pro wrestler known for her time in Total Nonstop Action Wrestling). In 1994, the GWF paid tribute to Kerry again in a month-long series of past matches Kerry was involved in, including some from World Class.

=== Chris Adams as the focus ===
Chris Adams not only played big part in GWF he was also in WCCW as a performer and a trainer. His most known student now a WWE Hall of Famer Stone Cold Steve Austin. There were many others he trained over the years two in particular was a masked tag team that looked identical and was only known as Unknown Wrestler 1 & 2. One of the two was hurt in the ring ending his wrestling career late in 91 and the other quit not long after never revealing their identities. Chris had commented about the injured wrestler, saying that it's a great loss to the wrestling world, and that the young man had more heart and love for the business than he has seen in a long time.

Afterwards, the federation centered mostly on Adams, who again ran his wrestling school and was working a feud with both Price and Iceman Parsons; as well as assist in booking various matches. During one 1993 match, Adams accidentally tore the hair weave off the hair of Price, resulting in stitches on his head. Chris' former second wife Toni Adams, whom he brought in to the storyline, was also involved, siding with Price and Parsons; and during one match, she attempted to rub Freebird Hair Cream into Chris' eyes. The former couple also was wrestling in Memphis' United States Wrestling Association promotion, where Toni was billed as Nanny Simpson. Chris and Toni's son Chris Jr., then about 5 years old, also made a few appearances in the ring.

A renewed feud between Adams and Jimmy Garvin took place, but the closing of the GWF on September 21, 1994, ended any prospects of a long angle between the two former rivals, and Garvin retired shortly thereafter.

Despite all of these angles, Adams won the GWF North American title twice, defeating King Parsons on December 25, 1993; then beating Rod Price on July 1, 1994, to regain the title he lost three months earlier to Price. It would be Adams' last championship glory, as he would never win another major title again.

In 1994, however, the company would fold. Their last show aired on September 25.

=== Life after the GWF ===
After the GWF folded, promoter Jim Crockett Jr. brought the NWA back to the Sportatorium for a tenure lasting less than a year. After several other attempts to keep wrestling going, the Sportatorium was demolished in 2003.

ESPN still holds the rights to the GWF library and airs episodes on ESPN Classic. The WWE Video Library also gained access to GWF content in 2013.

== Championships ==
- GWF North American Heavyweight Championship
- GWF Television Championship
- GWF Texas Heavyweight Championship
- GWF Brass Knuckles Championship
- GWF Light Heavyweight Championship
- GWF Tag Team Championship
- GWF World Heavyweight Championship

In 1991, the GWF announced a fictitious world champion named 'Baron Von Steiger'. In 1994, the North American Championship was renamed the GWF World or simply the GWF Heavyweight Championship starting on January 2, 1994, when Chris Adams was champion.

- GWF Commonwealth Championship

When the GWF launched, Axl Rotten was announced as being the GWF Commonwealth Champion. He was said on the first episode of GWF television to have held the belt for nearly a year.

- GWF tournaments
