= WWE Hall of Fame (2007) =

WWE Hall of Fame induction ceremony

- Promotion: WWE
- Date: March 31, 2007
- City: Detroit, Michigan
- Venue: Fox Theatre

WWE Hall of Fame chronology
← Previous; 2006	Next → 2008

WWE Hall of Fame (2007) was the event which featured the introduction of the 8th class to the WWE Hall of Fame. The event was produced by World Wrestling Entertainment (WWE) on March 31, 2007, from the Fox Theatre in Detroit, Michigan. The event took place the same weekend as WrestleMania 23. The event was hosted by Todd Grisham. The ceremony aired later that evening on USA Network. In March 2015 the ceremony was added to the WWE Network.

== Inductees ==
=== Individual ===
- Class headliners appear in **boldface**

Image	Ring name (Birth Name)	Inducted by	WWE recognized accolades
	**"The American Dream" Dusty Rhodes** (Virgil Runnels Jr.)	Cody Runnels and Dustin Rhodes	Three-time NWA World Heavyweight Champion; One-time NWA United States Heavyweight Champion; Two-time NWA World Tag Team Champion; Two-time NWA World Six-Tag Team Champion; Three-time NWA World Television Champion; Long-time lead booker for WCW; Creator of the WarGames match
	"Mr. Perfect" Curt Hennig	Wade Boggs	Posthumous inductee: Represented by his widow Leonice, his sons Joe and Hank, his daughters Amy and Katie, his mother Irene, and his father Larry "The Axe" Hennig. One-time AWA World Heavyweight Champion; One-time AWA World Tag Team Champion; Two-time WWF Intercontinental Heavyweight Champion; One-time WCW United States Heavyweight Champion; One-time WCW World Tag Team Champion
	Jerry "The King" Lawler	William Shatner	One-time AWA World Heavyweight Champion; 52-time AWA Southern Heavyweight Champion; Three-time WCCW Heavyweight Champion; 28-time USWA Unified Champion; Longtime color commentator for WWE
	Nick Bockwinkel	Bobby Heenan	Four-time AWA World Heavyweight Champion; Three-time AWA World Tag Team Champion
	Mr. Fuji (Harry Fujiwara)	Don Muraco	Five-time WWWF/WWF World Tag Team Champion. Former manager
	The Sheik (Edward Farhat)	Rob Van Dam; Sabu	Posthumous inductee: Represented by his widow Joyce. Also known as "The Original Sheik", a two-time WWWF United States Heavyweight Champion, held over 20 NWA regional championships
	Jim Ross	Stone Cold Steve Austin	Longtime lead announcer for WWF/E, WCW and other regional promotions Head of WWF Talent Relations during the Attitude Era, signing many well known wrestlers

=== Group ===
Group	Inducted by	WWE recognized accolades
**The Wild Samoans**	Samu and Matt Anoaʻi	Three-time WWF Tag Team Champions
Afa (Arthur Anoaʻi); Sika (Leati Anoaʻi)
