= Hollywood Blonds =

Professional wrestling tag team

The Hollywood Blonds is a name used by several professional wrestling tag teams over the years.

The original Blonds were Buddy Roberts and Jerry Brown, who used the name in the 1970s. Rip Rogers and Ted Oates wrestled as The Hollywood Blonds in the mid-1980s in the National Wrestling Alliance's (NWA) Jim Crockett Promotions (JCP). The name was also adopted by "Pretty Boy" Larry Sharpe and "Dynamite" Jack Evans, who had a stint in then World Wide Wrestling Federation (WWWF). The most well-known team to use the "Hollywood Blonds" moniker was "Stunning" Steve Austin and "Flyin" Brian Pillman who used the name as a heel tag team in World Championship Wrestling (WCW) in 1992 and 1993 and is often mentioned when talking about great tag teams.

== Buddy Roberts and Jerry Brown ==
The Hollywood Blonds V1

Tag team
- Members: Buddy Roberts; Jerry Brown
- Billed heights: Roberts: 6 ft 1 in (1.85 m); Brown: Unknown
- Billed from: Hollywood, California
- Debut: 1970
- Disbanded: 1977

The team of Buddy Roberts (billed as "Dale Roberts") and Jerry Brown were the first to adopt the name "The Hollywood Blonds" in wrestling when they began teaming together in 1970 in the National Wrestling Alliance (NWA) Tri-State territory (NWA Tri State promoted in Oklahoma, Arkansas, Louisiana and Mississippi).

The two quickly became one of the top heel acts in the territory with their "Hollywood superstar" arrogance and cheating ways. On May 8, 1970, the Blonds won their first title when they won a tournament to crown new NWA United States Tag Team Champions (Tri State version). Their first run with the title was short as Luke Brown and Danny Hodge defeated them three weeks later, but the Blonds managed to regain the gold days after being defeated by them. For the rest of 1970, Roberts and Brown dominated the Tri State tag team scene until losing to Bill Watts and Billy Red Lyons in January 1971. In early 1973, the Blonds became three-time NWA United States Tag Team Champions by defeating Dennis Stamp and Bull Bullinski for the titles. The Blonds held on to the titles until sometime in April, when they lost the gold to Rip Tyler and Eddie Sullivan before leaving the promotion by mid-1973.

After leaving the Tri State area, Roberts and Brown next popped up in Florida working for Eddie Graham’s Championship Wrestling from Florida (CWF). After working their way up the ranks, the duo challenged for and won the top tag team title in the promotion, the NWA Florida Tag Team Championship, from the team of Dick Slater and Stan Vachon in March 1974. The Blonds ruled the tag team division over the summer of 1974 until dropping the gold to Dick Slater and Toru Tanaka in the fall (either September or October). After their run with the titles ended, the Blonds moved on to another territory, the most natural territory for the team – NWA Hollywood Wrestling in Los Angeles. The Gene and Mike LeBell territory saw Roberts and Brown win the NWA Americas Tag Team Championship four times between December 1974 and August 1975, defeating such teams as Victor Rivera and Louie Tillet, Porkchop Cash and S.D. Jones, John Tolos and Louis Tillet, and the promotion's biggest tag-team attraction Black Gorman and Goliath. During their time in Los Angeles, the Hollywood Blonds were also involved in an angle that saw the Los Angeles version of the NWA North American Tag Team Championship shift over to New Japan Pro-Wrestling (NJPW) as their main tag team title of that day. On August 1, 1975, reigning champions Antonio Inoki and Seiji Sakaguchi fought the Hollywood Blonds to a no contest, after which the titles were declared vacant. A rematch in Nagoya, Japan saw the Blonds win the North American Tag Team titles on September 22. On October 2, Inoki and Sakaguchi regained the titles and they became more or less exclusive to NJPW after that date.

When the Blonds' time in Los Angeles ended near the end of 1975, they returned to the Tri State promotion and immediately targeted the United States Tag Team championship. On March 18, 1976, the duo defeated Greg Valentine and Gorgeous George, Jr. Due to disputes over pay and billing the Blonds’ time in Tri State was short lived, they quickly dropped the tag team title to Buck Robley and Bob Slaughter only eleven days after they won them. The Blonds next appeared in CWF once more, winning the Florida Tag Team titles from Steve Keirn and Bob Backlund not long after arriving in the territory. Just like with Tri State, their stay in Florida was short, as they dropped the titles to Mike Graham and Ken Lucas only a few months later and left. After a short stay in Florida, the duo began working for Jim Crockett’s Mid-Atlantic Championship Wrestling (MACW). On January 17, 1977, Roberts and Brown defeated the team of Dino Bravo and Tim Woods for the NWA Mid-Atlantic Tag Team Championship and held on to it for three months until Bravo and new partner Tiger Conway Jr. beat them for the gold. During the summer of 1977, the Hollywood Blonds moved from Mid-Atlantic to Memphis and the NWA Mid-America promotion (later Continental Wrestling Association, CWA). In Memphis, the Blonds shot up the tag team ranks right off the bat defeating Bob Ellis and Jim Garvin for the AWA Southern Tag Team Championship on July 25. The Blonds lost the titles to Norvell Austin and Pat Barrett on August 15. After holding the titles two more times, the team lost them for good to Austin and Barrett on September 25, 1977.

Shortly after losing the Southern Tag Team titles, Brown and Roberts split up, with Roberts going on to form The Fabulous Freebirds with Terry Gordy and Michael Hayes while Brown kept working as a singles wrestler mainly in the south.

== Rip Rogers and Ted Oates ==
The Hollywood Blonds V2

Tag team
- Members: Rip Rogers; Ted Oates
- Billed from: Hollywood, California
- Debut: 1984
- Disbanded: 1984

In 1984, Rip Rogers and Ted Oates adopted the Hollywood Blonds moniker and "Superstar" gimmick for a run in the NWA's Mid-Atlantic Championship Wrestling territory. Rogers had previously teamed up with Gary Royal and Pez Whatley in a Hollywood Blonds inspired team known as The Convertible Blondes in Angelo Poffo's International Championship Wrestling (ICW).

The arrogant heel team defeated Ron Garvin and Oates' brother, Jerry, to win the NWA National Tag Team Championship on September 20, 1984. Rogers and Oates held on to the titles for a little over a month. They lost the titles to The Lightning Express (Brad Armstrong and Tim Horner) on November 1. Not long after losing the titles, Rogers and Oates split up when Rip Rogers left the area to pursue a singles career.

== Dusty Wolfe and Ken Timbs ==
The Hollywood Blonds V3

Tag team
- Members: Dusty Wolfe; Ken Timbs
- Billed from: Hollywood, California
- Debut: 1984
- Disbanded: 1984

From August till October 1984, Dusty Wolfe and Ken Timbs formed The Hollywood Blondes in Florida.

== Steve Austin and Brian Pillman ==
The Hollywood Blonds V4

Tag team
- Members: Steve Austin; Brian Pillman
- Billed heights: Austin: 6 ft 2 in (1.88 m); Pillman: 6 ft 0 in (1.83 m)
- Combined billed weight: 480 lb (220 kg; 34 st)
- Billed from: Hollywood, California
- Debut: October 17, 1992
- Disbanded: October 30, 1993

The version of The Hollywood Blonds with the greatest exposure worldwide was the World Championship Wrestling (WCW) incarnation consisting of "Stunning" Steve Austin and "Flyin'" Brian Pillman. Austin and Pillman teamed for the first time on October 17, 1992 and battled to a draw with Shane Douglas and Brad Armstrong. Austin and Pillman also teamed against Scott Steiner and Marcus Alexander Bagwell, jobber tag team Chris Sullivan and Tommy Angel, Dustin Rhodes and Brad Armstrong (who was filling in for Barry Windham), Armstrong and Bagwell, Ricky Steamboat and Nikita Koloff, and Steamboat and Douglas. Austin and Pillman temporarily stopped teaming when in late 1992, the recently heel turned Brian Pillman started teaming with Barry Windham, but when Windham was groomed for a singles push and a run with the NWA World Heavyweight Championship, and after one last unsuccessful attempt at winning the WCW/NWA World Tag Team Championship from Ricky Steamboat and Shane Douglas at Starrcade 1992, Pillman and Windham stopped teaming. Windham declared his intention to pursue the NWA world title, and told Pillman he should instead team with Austin. However, the real reason for the team's reunion was that the WCW bookers didn't have any other immediate plans for Austin.

At first, the two were just billed as "Stunning" Steve and "Flyin'" Brian, but the two (with input from Scotty "Flamingo" Levy) came up with the idea of The Hollywood Blonds, complete with matching trunks and vests. The duo was immediately thrust into a feud with Shane Douglas and Ricky Steamboat over the NWA and WCW World Tag Team titles, which gave the duo a chance to show off their teamwork and their trademark "mock filming" pose that they invented. After a successful move, one of the Blonds would move his hands like he was turning the handle on an old film camera. After winning a match, Austin or Pillman would arrogantly state that "Your brush with greatness is over" to further annoy the fans. Austin and Pillman made their pay-per-view (PPV) debut on February 21, 1993 taking on Buff Bagwell and Erik Watts at SuperBrawl III, which Austin and Pillman won the match.

On the March 27, 1993 episode of Power Hour, Austin and Pillman defeated Ricky Steamboat and Shane Douglas to win their only NWA/WCW World Tag Team Championship. Though Steamboat and Douglas had several rematches, they were unable to recapture the titles. On one night, Austin and Pillman faced an unknown masked team known as "Dos Hombres" (literally "two guys") who they assumed were a couple of luchadores from Mexico. The match started out rather inconspicuously, until the two masked men started showing moves more consistent with Ricky Steamboat and Shane Douglas than two luchadores. Dos Hombres won the match, earning them a shot at the titles at Slamboree. However, by the time Slamboree came about, Douglas had been fired by WCW and Steamboat was without a partner. Instead of canceling the already announced steel cage match, Tom Zenk was made to wear the mask of "Hombre Uno" and work the match without anyone realizing it wasn't Douglas under the red and green hood. The Blonds won at Slamboree, thus ending the "Dos Hombres" angle.

After the feud with Steamboat and Douglas ended, the Blonds were programmed with the recently reformed Four Horsemen, who at the time consisted of Ric Flair, Paul Roma, and Ole and Arn Anderson. Flair had recently returned from a run with then World Wrestling Federation (WWF) and been given a talk show segment called "A Flair for the Gold" to give Flair television time before his WWF release allowed him to wrestle for WCW. Pillman and Austin appeared on the show and mocked Flair and Anderson's age. Several weeks later, the Blonds continued their antagonism of Flair and Anderson by mocking them through their own segment called "A Flare for the Old". Austin would stand in the background with a pillow under his shirt for a gut while slowly stroking his chin imitating Arn Anderson. Pillman dressed up in an old bathrobe, put on reading glasses and a grey wig and then cut into Flair for being too old and too scared of the Hollywood Blonds. The impersonation drew Ric Flair back in the ring at Clash of the Champions XXIII, where Flair and Anderson challenged the Blonds for the tag team titles. Despite winning the two out of three falls match, they did not win the titles since the Blonds were disqualified after Barry Windham interfered.

Windham's attack shifted Flair's focus away from the Hollywood Blonds, which in turn meant that Arn Anderson needed a new tag team partner. Not long after the Clash, Paul Roma was introduced as the fourth Horseman and would team with Anderson in the Horsemen/Blonds feud. On July 18, at Beach Blast, Roma and Anderson were beaten by the Blonds, who cheated to retain their titles. Not long after Beach Blast, Pillman injured his ankle and was unable to compete at a scheduled title match at Clash of the Champions XXIV. However, due to WCW taping policies, Arn Anderson and Paul Roma had already been taped as the World Tag Team Champions so the title change had to happen despite Pillman being injured. Austin teamed with "Lord" Steven Regal at the Clash where they dropped the titles to Roma and Anderson.

As soon as the Blonds dropped the titles, the team was again temporarily split up. Austin and Pillman both claimed that it was for political reasons. Austin was given a singles push challenging Dustin Rhodes for the WCW United States Heavyweight Championship. After Pillman finally recovered, he and Austin had a few more matches together taking on teams such as Marcus Alexander Bagwell and 2 Cold Scorpio, Scorpio and Ron Simmons, Simmons and Ice Train, jobber tag teams Frankie Lancaster and Mark Starr and Frankie Rowe and Jimmy Rogers. The Blonds also confronted The Nasty Boys and Missy Hyatt during an interview after The Nasty Boys had won the titles from Anderson and Roma. The Blonds' last match as a team took place on the October 30, 1993 episode of Saturday Night. After the Blonds had defeated a jobber tag team, Col. Rob Parker (who had just become Austin's new manager) came to ringside to congratulate Austin (and not Pillman) on winning the match. Pillman took exception to Parker snubbing him. Parker brought up Pillman's bad leg and said if he was a race horse, he would put him down. Pillman attacked Parker, which in turn led to Austin attacking and turning on Pillman, turning Pillman face and breaking up the Hollywood Blonds for the third and final time. The Austin/Pillman feud was never pushed intensely and at times played more for comedy than emotion, a fact underscored by Pillman being more interested in putting Parker in a chicken suit than getting back at Austin.

They would briefly reunite in the WWF in 1996, but not as the Blonds. Austin by then was using his new "Stone Cold" persona, and an injured Pillman was "The Loose Cannon" and acted primarily as his sidekick, until Austin turned on Pillman for showing his admiration for Austin's nemesis, Bret Hart. They also feuded in 1997.

According to WrestlingData.com, a compiler of available win–loss records, The Hollywood Blonds are perfectly balanced at 52-52, with 8 draws.

In 1999, Lenny Lane and Lodi used the name The West Hollywood Blondes as a play off the old name.

== Championships and accomplishments ==
=== Roberts and Brown ===
- Continental Wrestling Association
  - AWA Southern Tag Team Championship (1 time)
- Championship Wrestling from Florida
  - NWA Florida Tag Team Championship (2 times)
- Grand Prix Wrestling (Montreal)
  - Grand Prix Tag Team Championship (4 times)
- Mid-Atlantic Championship Wrestling
  - NWA Mid-Atlantic Tag Team Championship (1 time)
- NWA Hollywood Wrestling
  - NWA Americas Tag Team Championship (4 times)
- NWA Tri-State
  - NWA United States Tag Team Championship (Tri-State version) (3 times)
- New Japan Pro-Wrestling
  - NWA North American Tag Team Championship (Los Angeles/Japan version) (1 time)

=== Rogers and Oates ===
- National Wrestling Alliance
  - NWA National Tag Team Championship (1 time)

=== Austin and Pillman ===
- Pro Wrestling Illustrated
  - PWI ranked them # 50 of the 100 best tag teams during the "PWI Years" in 2003.
- World Championship Wrestling
  - NWA World Tag Team Championship (1 time)
  - WCW World Tag Team Championship (1 time)
- Wrestling Observer Newsletter
  - Tag Team of the Year (1993)

== See also ==
- Fabulous Freebirds
- Four Horsemen
- Stud Stable
- Varsity Blonds
- West Hollywood Blonds
