= Lightning Express (professional wrestling) =

Professional wrestling tag team

Tag team
- Members: Brad Armstrong "White Lightning" Tim Horner
- Billed heights: Brad Armstrong: 6 ft 0 in (1.83 m); Tim Horner: 5 ft 11 in (1.80 m)
- Combined billed weight: 453 lb (205 kg)
- Debut: 1984
- Disbanded: 1995

The Lightning Express was a professional wrestling tag team, composed of Brad Armstrong and Tim Horner.

== History ==
=== National Wrestling Alliance (1984–1988) ===
Armstrong and Horner first teamed under the moniker the "Lightning Express" in 1984, in the National Wrestling Alliance's Jim Crockett Promotions. The name came from Horner's nickname, "White Lightning", and the remarkable speed of both wrestlers.

A babyface team, they won the NWA National Tag Team Championship from The Hollywood Blonds. The Lightning Express split up soon after, and each went his separate way, until they reformed in Jim Crockett Promotions in 1986. Here they feuded with The Midnight Express and the team of Ivan Koloff and Krusher Khruschev, over the NWA United States Tag Team Championship.

They left Crockett for the Universal Wrestling Federation in 1987, where they won the UWF Tag Team Championship from Sting and Rick Steiner and feuded with The Sheepherders. When Jim Crockett, Jr. bought the UWF in 1987, the team returned to his promotion. On the October 24th, 1987 episode of Power Pro Wrestling they were defeated for the UWF titles by The Sheepherders. The Express continued to wrestle together until 1988, when they split up.

=== World Championship Wrestling (1990–1991) ===
In July 1990 Tim Horner returned to WCW and almost immediately began teaming again with Armstrong. The Lightning Express had their first match back on July 16, 1990 in Gainesville, GA during a WCW Saturday Night taping, defeating Arn Anderson & Barry Windham by disqualification. On August 20 at a WCW Power Hour taping the duo defeated NWA United States Tag Team Champions The Midnight Express via disqualification. Their win streak was snapped at two, as they fell to The Master Blasters in the debut at Clash of the Champions XII on September 5. This would be their last teaming for several months, as Horner formed a tandem with Mike Rotundo while Armstrong received a singles push as "The Candyman".

The Express returned to action on January 8, 1991 at a WCW Saturday Night taping, wrestling The Fabulous Freebirds to a double-disqualification. They would team again later in the month to face The Horsemen on another episode of Saturday Night. On the March 2nd episode of WCW Saturday Night the Express was defeated by The Freebirds in what would be their final WCW match for four years.

=== World Championship Wrestling (1995) ===
The duo was briefly reunited after Tim Horner rejoined WCW in 1995, the team name was rarely mentioned on-air. Armstrong & Horner made their first appearance on a February 3, 1995 taping of WCW Worldwide in Orlando, FL. In a match that later aired on April 9, they were defeated by The Blue Bloods. A week earlier (in a match taped on March 22 at Center Stage for WCW Saturday Night), the pairing received a non-title match against WCW World Tag Team Champions Harlem Heat, but were unsuccessful. They received a rematch against The Blue Bloods at an April 5 taping for The Main Event, but were again unsuccessful. In a dark match at an April 12 taping of WCW Saturday Night they were defeated by Arn Anderson & Ric Flair, but later in the night earned their first victory in their comeback when they defeated Len Denton & Jim Rogers in a match that aired April 22. A day later they also beat Tony Vincent & Jim Rogers by pinfall, in what would be their final WCW match.

== Championships and accomplishments ==
- National Wrestling Alliance

- NWA National Tag Team Championship (1 time)

- Universal Wrestling Federation

- UWF Tag Team Championship (1 time)
