= Jules Strongbow =

American retired professional wrestler (born 1952)

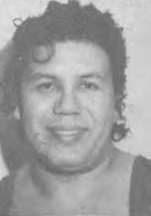
- Strongbow, c. 1983

Personal information
- Born: Francis Huntington; November 29, 1952 (age 73) Omaha, Nebraska, U.S.

Professional wrestling career
- Ring names: Bruce Huntington; Chief Frank Hill; Chief Jules Strongbow; Chief Running Hill; Frank Hill; Frankie Hill; Frank Running Hill; Jules Strongbow
- Billed height: 6 ft 3 in (191 cm)
- Billed weight: 240 lb (109 kg)
- Debut: 1973
- Retired: 2001

Francis Huntington (born November 29, 1952) is an American retired professional wrestler. He is best known for his appearances with the World Wrestling Federation (WWF) in the early 1980s under the ring name Jules Strongbow, (Note: There was an earlier "Jules Strongbow"—John Ralph Bilbo (1906–1975), who wrestled in the 1930s and, later, promoted in California through the 1950s.) where he held the WWF World Tag Team Championship on two occasions with his kayfabe brother, Chief Jay Strongbow.

== Professional wrestling career ==
=== Early career (1973–1982) ===
Huntington debuted in 1973 as "Frank Hill", wrestling for professional wrestling promotions such as the American Wrestling Association.

In late 1979, he teamed with Wahoo McDaniel in the All Japan Pro Wrestling World's Strongest Tag Determination League tournament.

=== World Wrestling Federation (1982–1983) ===
In 1982, Huntington was hired by the World Wrestling Federation (WWF). He was renamed "Jules Strongbow" and placed into a tag team with Chief Jay Strongbow, who was billed as his brother. They formed a noted tag team, known as the Strongbows. On June 28, 1982, the Strongbows defeated the team of Mr. Fuji and Mr. Saito for their first WWF Tag Team Championship. On the July 13 edition of Championship Wrestling, the Strongbows lost the belts back to Fuji and Saito. On the October 26 edition of Championship Wrestling, the Strongbows defeated Fuji and Saito for their second tag title reign. They were defeated for the belts in Allentown, Pennsylvania, on the March 8, 1983, edition of Championship Wrestling by the Wild Samoans (Afa and Sika). Shortly after losing the title, Huntington left the WWF.

=== Later career (1983–2001) ===
After leaving the WWF, Huntington later competed on the independent circuit for several years, most notably in top independent promotions such as the Pennsylvania-based National Wrestling Federation and Ohio's International Wrestling Alliance. He even wrestled in World Class Championship Wrestling (WCCW) for a while. He retired in 2001.

== Personal life ==
Unlike Joe Scarpa, an Italian-American who wrestled as Chief Jay Strongbow, Huntington is an actual American Indian and enrolled member of the Oneida Nation of Wisconsin.

Following his retirement from professional wrestling, Huntington volunteered with the Native American Students Association at Missouri State University.

== Championships and accomplishments ==
- International Wrestling Association
  - IWA United States Heavyweight Championship (1 time)
- NWA Hollywood Wrestling
  - NWA Americas Tag Team Championship ( 1 time ) - with Al Madril
  - NWA World Tag Team Championship ( Los Angeles Version ) ( 1 time ) - with Al Madril
- National Wrestling Federation
  - NWF Heavyweight Championship (1 time)
  - NWF Tag Team Championship (2 times) – with Al Bold Eagle (1 time) and Navajo Warrior (1 time)
- NWA Tri-State
  - NWA Tri-State Tag Team Championship ( 4 times) – with Terry Orndorff (1 time) , Eric Embry (1 time), Tom Jones ( 1 time ) , & George Wells (wrestler) ( 1 time)
- World Wrestling Federation
  - WWF World Tag Team Championship (2 times) – with Chief Jay Strongbow
