= Samoan SWAT Team =

Professional wrestling tag team

Tag team
- Name(s): Gangstas in Paradise; Hawaiian Beasts; Headshrinkers; Samoan Gangster Party; Samoan SWAT Team
- Members: Big Matty Smalls; Fatu; Great Kokina; Jacob Fatu; Juicy Finau; Lance Anoaʻi; Samoan Savage; Samu; Sione
- Manager: Paul Heyman
- Billed from: Hawaii "Samoa"; Tahiti
- Debut: 1988
- Disbanded: 29 October 2023
- Years active: 1988–1996; 2022–2023

The Samoan SWAT Team was a professional wrestling tag team and stable.

The original Samoan SWAT Team primarily comprised Fatu and Samu, but various iterations alternatively included Great Kokina, Big Matty Smalls, Samoan Savage, and Sione. They competed in promotions including New Japan Pro-Wrestling, World Wrestling Council, World Class Championship Wrestling, and World Championship Wrestling (WCW) in the late 1980s and early 1990s. The team also appeared in the World Wrestling Federation (WWF, now known as WWE) as the Headshrinkers, in Extreme Championship Wrestling (ECW) as the Samoan Gangster Party (also known as Gangstas in Paradise), and in the Universal Wrestling Association as the Hawaiian Beasts. In 2022 to 2023, a new iteration of the Samoan SWAT Team comprising Jacob Fatu, Juicy Finau, and Lance Anoaʻi was active in Major League Wrestling (MLW), with Anoaʻi and Finau winning the MLW World Tag Team Championship.

The original Samoan SWAT Team portrayed a pair of Samoan "savages", often displaying uncivilized behavior such as biting into a turkey carcass during a match and dragging each other by their hair. They were also billed as having hard heads that were impervious to pain; any attack that targeted a Headshrinker's head would have no effect, and an opponent who tried to headbutt one of them would end up hurting himself. Having hard heads went with typical professional wrestling portrayals of Samoan wrestlers. Most members of the team were members of the Anoaʻi family.

== History ==
=== Samoan SWAT Team (1987–1992) ===
Samula "Samu" Anoaʻi is the son of Wild Samoan Afa Anoaʻi and Solofa Fatu is the nephew of Afa as well as both of them being the nephews of Sika Anoaʻi and part of the Anoaʻi family. In 1985, Samu joined Gino Brito and Dino Bravo's Montreal-based Lutte Internationale promotion, which was the first time he worked in the same territory as his cousin Fatu. When the promotion closed up two years later, the two cousins signed with the World Wrestling Council in Puerto Rico and were packaged as the "Samoan SWAT Team": Samu and Fatu.

The team adopted the "Samoan savage" gimmick that had made their fathers so well known and feared throughout the wrestling world, working barefoot and never speaking English on camera. The team became the first ever WWC Caribbean Tag Team Championship on November 7, 1987 when they beat Invader I and Invader III. The duo held the titles for just over a month before dropping them to Mark Youngblood and Chris Youngblood before leaving the promotion.

Samu and Fatu next appeared in Texas, working for Fritz Von Erich's World Class Championship Wrestling promotion. The storyline was that Buddy Roberts brought the team in to fight his fights against the Von Erich family and former Fabulous Freebirds partners Michael Hayes and Terry Gordy. Rogers claimed that "SWAT" was an acronym for "Samoans Will Annihilate Traitors" referring to Hayes and Gordy. The team was presented as an unstoppable force, and even allowed to beat hometown heroes Kerry and Kevin Von Erich for the WCWA World Tag Team Championship on August 12, 1988.

The Samoans remained undefeated in WCCW until they came up against Roberts’ former partner Michael Hayes and Hayes new partner, "Do It To It" Steve Cox on September 12. The duo recaptured the titles four days later. Hayes and Cox would beat the Samoan SWAT Team for the titles once again on October 15, 1988, but lost it back two days later. On September 12, 1988 The Samoan SWAT Team become double champions as they beat "Hollywood" John Tatum and Jimmy Jack Funk for the WCWA Texas Tag Team Championship. The Samoan SWAT Team made their pay-per-view debut at SuperClash III, the first (and only) PPV that the American Wrestling Association ever presented. The Samoans successfully defended their WCCW Tag Team Championship against Michael Hayes and Steve Cox.

In the beginning of 1989, the Samoans left WCCW, forcing both sets of tag team titles to be vacated due to the sudden departure.

The Samoan SWAT Team signed with World Championship Wrestling and was brought in as manager Paul E. Dangerously's replacements for the "Original" Midnight Express who had left the promotion. The Samoans also took over the "Original" Midnight Express’ feud with the Midnight Express beating the team at Clash of the Champions VI on April 2, 1989. At The 1989 Great American Bash the Samoans teamed with former rival Michael Hayes, Terry Gordy and Jimmy Garvin losing a War Games Match to the Road Warriors, the Midnight Express and Steve Williams.

In the fall of 1989, Paul E. Dangerously was phased out and the Samoans were given a new manager: "The Big Kahuna" Oliver Humperdink. Their ranks were also bolstered by the addition of The Samoan Savage (Fatu's brother). The Samoans started to lose more and more matches as 1989 drew to a close, but their fortunes appeared to be changing due to the injury to Sid Vicious. Because Vicious was injured The Skyscrapers had to pull out of the "Iron Team Tournament" at Starrcade '89: Future Shock.

In late-1989, Fatu briefly teamed with the Samoan Savage as "The New Wild Samoans" (a reference to the "original" Wild Samoans). For the remainder of the Samoan SWAT Team's time in WCW Fatu and the Samoan Savage competed under the name "New Wild Samoans", while Samu made a few singles appearances.

After leaving WCW in the summer of 1990 the Samoan SWAT Team worked for a number of independent promotions in the US, Europe, Mexico and Japan, often teaming up with family member Rodney Anoaʻi who competed as "Kokina Maximus". The trio wrestled for the Universal Wrestling Association as the "Hawaiian Beasts", where they won the UWA World Trios Championship.

=== Headshrinkers (1992–1994) ===
In 1992, Samu and Fatu signed up with the World Wrestling Federation, managed by Samu's father Afa. The team changed their name to the "Headshrinkers" but their gimmick remained the same, Samoan wildmen. Rodney Anoaʻi also signed with the WWF but he was repackaged as "Yokozuna" and the family ties between him and the Samoans were not mentioned on air. The team debuted on an edition of WWF Prime Time Wrestling defeating local jobbers being called The Samoans, however the team vanished quickly. As The Headshrinkers they first made their presence known when they helped Money Inc. beat the Natural Disasters to win the WWF World Tag Team titles. Early in their run with the WWF the Headshrinkers feuded with the Natural Disasters and the recently formed High Energy.

Between 1992 and the early parts of 1994, the Headshrinkers maintained a position in the middle of the tag team division, occasionally challenging for the titles and making sporadic PPV appearances feuding with teams like the Smoking Gunns and Men on a Mission. The Headshrinkers assisted their relative Yokozuna in a casket match against The Undertaker at the 1994 Royal Rumble. In March 1994 the Headshrinkers turned face and challenged then tag-team champions The Quebecers, with the addition of manager Lou Albano the team won the gold on May 2, 1994. (Taped April 26, 1994). At King of the Ring 1994 on June 19 the Headshrinkers successfully defended their tag team titles against Yokozuna and Crush. Their run with the titles came to a surprising end on an untelevised card on August 28 where they lost the titles to Shawn Michaels and Diesel. The title change happened just one day before they were scheduled to defend against Irwin R. Schyster and Bam Bam Bigelow. Soon after the title change, Samu left the WWF to recover from injuries and was replaced by Sione.

=== New Headshrinkers (1994-1995) ===
The kayfabe reason given to Samu's departure was that he "ate some bad fish and got a disease" and was not coping well with manager Lou Albano's attempts to civilize the Headshrinkers, especially wearing boots. For the first time ever, one half of the team was neither a member of the Anoaʻi family nor a Samoan as Sione Vailahi was from the island of Tonga. The new combination made only one pay-per-view appearance as a team which was at the 1994 Survivor Series where they were quickly eliminated. The only other notable appearance of Fatu and Sione was as part of the tournament to crown new WWF tag team champions in late 1994, and early 1995. The Headshrinkers lost to Bam Bam Bigelow and Tatanka in the Semi Finals. By July, the Headshrinkers dissolved, as Sione left the WWF for WCW. By the time, the team was used to put over new teams such as The Blu Brothers.

=== Samoan Gangster Party (1995) ===
After being away from the spotlight for a while Samu returned to the WWF in 1995. Samu along with his cousin Matt Anoaʻi were known as the "Samoan Gangster Party" (or "Gangstas in Paradise") with Samu being known as "Sammy the Silk" and his cousin Matt Anoaʻi (son of Sika) became known as "Big Matty Smalls", and joined Samu as The Samoan Gangstas. The two men did not wrestle for the WWF but watched Fatu from afar as the former Headshrinker tried to turn himself into a positive role model for kids on the street. The angle was dropped as the Samoan Gangster Party never got in the ring or confronted Fatu before he was repackaged. In 1996 they worked for Extreme Championship Wrestling, debuting in June at Fight the Power. They feuded mainly with The Gangstas in a short but intense war.

=== Other iterations ===
From 2003 to 2006, Samu teamed with Mana as The Samoan Island Tribe.

Samu and Tama teamed in Mexico as "Los Samoanos".

In 2009, Samu and Nagumbo wrestled as "The New Samoans".

=== Major League Wrestling (2022–2023) ===
The group returned at Major League Wrestling's Kings of Colosseum led by Jacob Fatu with Lance Anoaʻi and Juicy Finau.

On January 7, 2023, Anoaʻi & Finau won the MLW World Tag Team Championship at Blood and Thunder by defeating E. J. Nduka and Calvin Tankman.

On April 6, 2023, Jacob Fatu defeated John Hennigan for the MLW National Openweight Championship at War Chamber

On October 29, 2023, Anoaʻi and Finau announced on X that they have been granted their release from MLW.

== Championships and accomplishments ==
- Major League Wrestling
  - MLW World Tag Team Championship (1 time) (Note: The MLW World Tag Team Championships were won and held by Juice Finau and Lance Anoaʻi instead of older members of The Samoan SWAT Team Generation and instead of other members of The Samoan SWAT Team)
  - MLW National Openweight Championship (1 time)
- Universal Wrestling Association
  - UWA World Trios Championship (1 time)
- World Class Championship Wrestling
  - WCWA World Tag Team Champion (3 times)
  - WCCW Texas Tag Team Champion (1 time)
- World Wrestling Council
  - WWC Caribbean Tag Team Championship (1 time)
- World Wrestling Federation
  - WWF Tag Team Championship (1 time)
  - Slammy Award (1 time)
    - Best Etiquette (1994)
- Wrestling Observer Newsletter
  - Worst Worked Match of the Year (1993) with Bastion Booger and Bam Bam Bigelow vs. The Bushwhackers and Men on a Mission at Survivor Series

== See also ==
- 3-Minute Warning
- Anoaʻi family
- The Bloodline
