= NWA National Tag Team Championship =

Professional wrestling championship

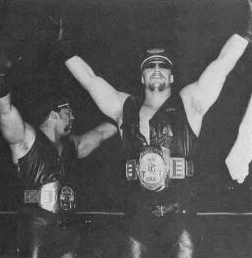
- The Road Warriors as NWA National Tag Team Champions, c. 1983

Details
- Promotion: Georgia Championship Wrestling
- Date established: November 27, 1980
- Date retired: January 1, 1986
Statistics
- First champions: The Fabulous Freebirds (Michael Hayes and Terry Gordy)
- Final champions: The Minnesota Wrecking Crew (Arn Anderson and Ole Anderson
- Most reigns: The Fabulous Freebirds and The Road Warriors (3 reigns)
- Longest reign: Arn and Ole Anderson (248 days)
- Shortest reign: King Kong Bundy and Masked Superstar (4 days)

The NWA National Tag Team Championship was the primary tag team championship in the National Wrestling Alliance (NWA)-affiliated Georgia Championship Wrestling professional wrestling promotion from 1980 until 1986.

== History ==
The championship was introduced in November 1980 when Georgia Tag Team Champions the Fabulous Freebirds (Michael Hayes, Buddy Roberts, and Terry Gordy) won a tournament to determine the first champions, defeating Stan Frazier and Robert Fuller in the final. They were introduced as the Georgia and National Tag Team Champions and carried a trophy to the ring representing the National title as they wore belts which represented the Georgia title.

The National Tag Team Championship continued to be represented by a trophy until Thanksgiving Night in 1981, when the promotion awarded newly made belts (modeled after the old Georgia tag team belts, which the National title replaced) to the winners of its annual turkey night tag team tournament. The father and son duo of Bob Armstrong and Brad Armstrong defeated Mr. Fuji and Mr. Saito in the final to win the vacant NWA National Tag Team Championship.

When the World Wrestling Federation's Vince McMahon bought Georgia Championship Wrestling's TV timeslot (after GCW's contract with Turner Broadcasting System expired without renewal: Black Saturday), the titleholders were Ron Garvin and Jerry Oates. After Oates and Garvin declined to sign with McMahon, McMahon discontinued the title.

A new wrestling promotion containing some former Georgia Championship Wrestling personnel - Championship Wrestling from Georgia - reactivated the title, and recognized Garvin & Oates as the titleholders, keeping the Georgia Championship Wrestling lineage unbroken. Jim Crockett Promotions bought the TBS wrestling timeslot from the WWF in 1985 -- and Championship Wrestling from Georgia (including CWG's Saturday morning TBS timeslot, as well) - keeping the title active. The title was written out of JCP storylines when titleholders Ole Anderson and Arn Anderson were stripped of the belts, and JCP replaced them by establishing its 'new' United States Tag Team Championship, and a tournament to crown its 'first' champions.

== Title history ==
Key
No.	Overall reign number
Reign	Reign number for the specific team—reign numbers for the individuals are in parentheses, if different
Days	Number of days held

No.	Champion	Championship change			Reign statistics		Notes	Ref.
No.	Champion	Date	Event	Location	Reign	Days	Notes	Ref.
1	The Fabulous Freebirds (Michael Hayes and Terry Gordy)	November 27, 1980	live event	Atlanta, Georgia	1	60	Defeated Stan Frazier and Robert Fuller in tournament final.	
2	Ted DiBiase and Stan Frazier	January 26, 1981	live event	Augusta, Georgia	1	5		
3	The Fabulous Freebirds (Michael Hayes and Terry Gordy)	January 31, 1981	live event	Atlanta, Georgia	2	130		
4	Ted DiBiase (2) and Steve Olsonoski	June 10, 1981	live event	Marietta, Georgia	1	26		
5	Terry Gordy (3) and Jimmy Snuka	July 6, 1981	live event	Augusta, Georgia	1	83	Tommy Rich and Ted DiBiase defeated Gordy and Snuka on July 19, 1981 in Atlanta, Georgia, but the belts were returned after the NWA found out that Michael Hayes counted the pinfall.	
6	Michael Hayes (3) and Otis Sistrunk	September 27, 1981	live event	Atlanta, Georgia	1	13		
—	Vacated	October 10, 1981	—	—	—	—	Sistrunk quit the company, date listed is first TV taping without Sistrunk.	
7	The Armstrongs (Bob and Brad Armstrong)	November 26, 1981	live event	Atlanta, Georgia	1	57	Defeated Mr. Fuji and Mr. Saito in tournament final and won a $30,000 cash prize.	
8	Super Destroyer and Masked Superstar	January 22, 1982	live event	Columbus, Georgia	1	45		
9	Super Destroyer (2) and Big John Studd	March 8, 1982	live event	N/A	1	116	Masked Superstar gave his half of title to Studd.	
10	The Fabulous Freebirds (Michael Hayes (4) and Terry Gordy (4))	July 2, 1982	live event	Chattanooga, Tennessee	3	58		
11	The Wild Samoans (Afa and Sika)	August 29, 1982	live event	Atlanta, Georgia	1	125		
—	Vacated	January 1, 1983	—	—	—	—	Storyline was that the Samoans refused to defend against Tommy Rich and Paul Orndorff, in reality they left GCW for the World Wrestling Federation.	
12	The Road Warriors (Animal and Hawk)	June 11, 1983	live event	Atlanta, Georgia	1	176	Won a fictitious tournament.	
13	The Sawyers (Buzz and Brett Sawyer)	December 4, 1983	live event	Canton, Ohio	1	55		
14	The Road Warriors (Animal and Hawk)	January 28, 1984	live event	Athens, Georgia	2	99	Awarded the championship when Buzz Sawyer was fired.	
15	King Kong Bundy and Masked Superstar (2)	May 6, 1984	live event	Atlanta, Georgia	1	4		
—	Vacated	May 10, 1984	—	—	—	—	Masked Superstar was said to be injured, to cover for him working in Japan.	
16	The Road Warriors (Animal and Hawk)	May 20, 1984	live event	Atlanta, Georgia	3	45	Defeated Junkyard Dog and Sweet Brown Sugar in a tournament final.	
17	Ron Garvin and Jerry Oates	July 4, 1984	live event	Columbus, Georgia	1	79	After the WWF purchased GCW on Black Saturday, a successor promotion, Championship Wrestling from Georgia, kept the titles on Garvin & Oates.	
18	The Hollywood Blonds (Rip Rogers and Ted Oates)	September 21, 1984	live event	Atlanta, Georgia	1	44		
19	The Lighting Express (Brad Armstrong (2) and Tim Horner)	November 4, 1984	live event	N/A	1	6		
—	Vacated	November 10, 1984	—	—	—	—	Horner was injured and unable to defend the championship	
20	The Long Riders (Bill Irwin and Scott Irwin (3))	November 18, 1984	live event	Atlanta, Georgia	1	54	Defeated Brad Armstrong and Jacques Rougeau in a tournament final, also won a $100,000 cash prize.	
21	Ole Anderson and Thunderbolt Patterson	January 11, 1985	live event	Cleveland, Ohio	1	78		
—	Vacated	March 30, 1985	—	—	—	—	Ole Anderson turned on Thunderbolt Patterson and broke up the team.	
22	The Minnesota Wrecking Crew (Ole Anderson (2) and Arn Anderson)	April 28, 1985	live event	Charlotte, North Carolina	1	248	Defeated Patterson and Manny Fernandez in a match where both Ole and Patterson's half of the titles were at stake, with Arn becoming the new title holder.	
—	Deactivated	January 1, 1986	—	—	—	—	Ole was injured by the Road Warriors and Dusty Rhodes in a match; replaced with the NWA United States Tag Team Championship.	

== See also ==
- National Wrestling Alliance
- Jim Crockett Promotions
