= Wild Samoans =

Professional wrestling tag team

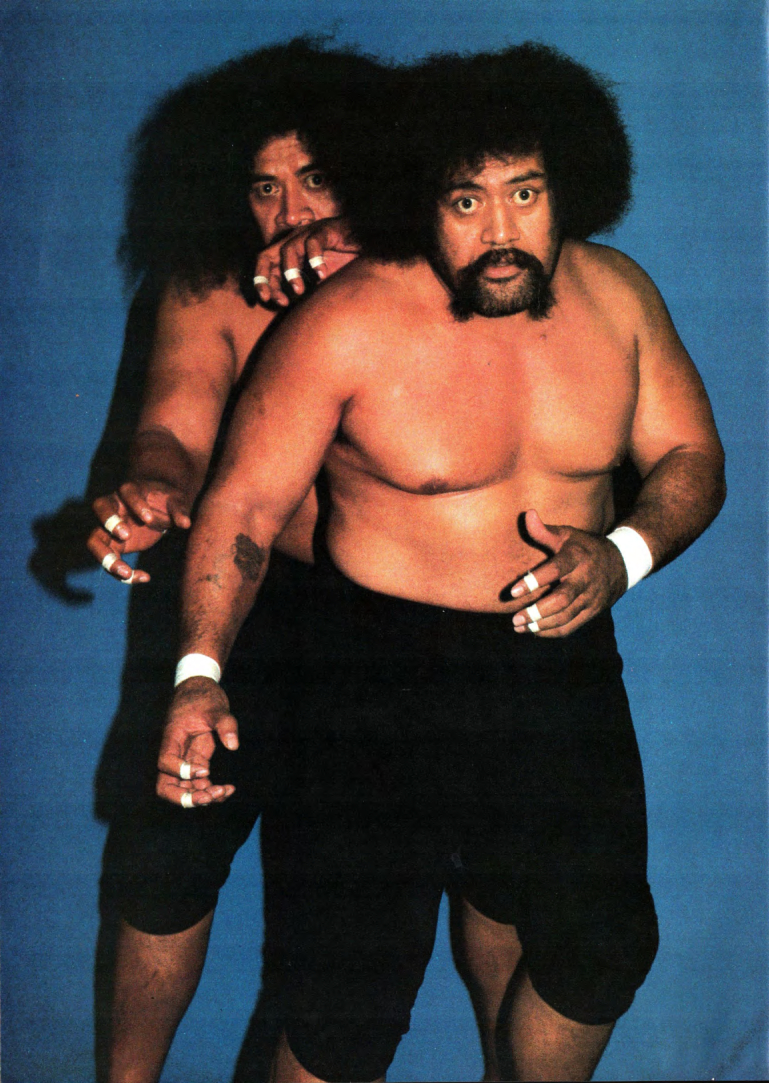

Tag team
- Members: Afa; Sika
- Name(s): The Samoans; The Samoan Warriors; The Wild Samoans; The Islanders
- Billed heights: 6 ft 2 in (1.88 m) each
- Combined billed weight: 645 lb (293 kg)
- Billed from: "The Isle of Samoa"
- Debut: 1973
- Disbanded: 1997
- Trained by: Peter Maivia

The Wild Samoans were the professional wrestling tag team of Afa Anoaʻi and Sika Anoaʻi in the National Wrestling Alliance (NWA) and the World Wrestling Federation (WWF). They held 20 tag team championships around the world.

== Gimmick ==
The Wild Samoans rarely spoke in interviews, instead grunting in a primitive dialect that only their manager Capt. Lou Albano could understand. They had afros and Fu Manchu moustaches. Sometimes they grew scruffy beards. Completing their "wild man" image, the duo engaged in outrageous behavior such as nose picking, biting opponents, and eating raw fish during interviews.

They are members of the Anoaʻi family. Their father Amituana'i Anoaʻi was a blood brother to their trainer Peter Maivia.

== History ==
=== Early years (1973–1979) ===
The team began its career in Stu Hart's Calgary, Alberta, Canada based Stampede Wrestling in 1973, where they won the Stampede International Tag Team Championship on two occasions. Then they went to Vancouver and won the tag titles there. In 1975 they made their debut in the United States for Big Time Wrestling in Detroit. They spent the majority of the 1970s in various National Wrestling Alliance (NWA) territories.

From 1977 to 1979, the Samoans made repeated tours of Japan with International Wrestling Enterprise. In January 1978, they briefly held the IWA World Tag Team Championship.

=== World Wrestling Federation (1979–1980) ===
In 1979, the Wild Samoans joined the World Wrestling Federation (WWF). They were initially billed as simply "The Samoans" before reverting to their better-known name. Occasionally, they were introduced as "Lou Albano's Wild Men" during TV tapings. They made their Madison Square Garden debut on January 21, 1980, in a WWF Tag Team Championship match against Tito Santana and Ivan Putski, who retained their title. In the upcoming months, both men became contenders for Bob Backlund's WWF Championship, but neither man won the gold. They won their first championship in the WWF, the tag team championship, by defeating Santana and Putski on April 12, 1980. They reigned as champions for approximately five months, until dropping the title to Backlund and Pedro Morales in a two out of three falls match at Showdown at Shea. Because Backlund was already the reigning WWF Champion, the team had to forfeit the title, and a tournament was held to crown new tag champions. On September 8, 1980, the Wild Samoans defeated Tony Garea and Rene Goulet in the tournament finals to win the title. Their reign lasted for one month, until they lost to Garea and his new partner, Rick Martel. The Wild Samoans feuded with the champions for the rest of the year, but they were not able to recapture the gold.

=== Mid-South and Georgia (1981–1982) ===
In late 1981, changing their name back to the Samoans they joined Mid-South Wrestling. With "Big Cat" Ernie Ladd as their financial adviser and manager, and then changing their team name from The Samoans to The Samoan Warriors, they won the Mid-South Tag Team Championship and feuded with Junkyard Dog and Dick Murdoch. After also attacking Ladd, the two began a feud with their former adviser. In response, Ladd sold their contract to Skandor Akbar and formed a team with "Iron" Mike Sharpe, with whom he forced the Wild Samoans to leave Mid-South.

After leaving Mid-South, the duo appeared in Georgia Championship Wrestling. As part of the territory, they defeated the Fabulous Freebirds for the NWA National Tag Team Championship, which they later vacated.

=== Return to WWF (1982–1985) ===
The Wild Samoans eventually ended up back in the World Wrestling Federation with their former manager Capt. Lou Albano in 1982. This time they grew full beards that were scruffy and bushy looking. Afa and Sika began their third WWF Tag Team Championship reign on March 8, 1983, by defeating Chief Jay and Jules Strongbow. In a rematch on March 19, they were also victorious. Also during this time, while feuding with Rocky Johnson, Jimmy Snuka, and André the Giant, the duo added Afa's son Samula to their team, first as a replacement for Sika when he got hurt, then as their backup upon his return.

They lost their tag team title to the team of Rocky Johnson and Tony Atlas on November 15.

During the match, Albano tried to interfere on the Samoans' behalf by attempting to hit Atlas over the head with a chair. He accidentally hit Afa instead and Atlas covered him for the win. The North-South Connection, Adrian Adonis and Dick Murdoch, would later defeat Atlas and Johnson for the tag title on April 17, 1984. The Samoans turned face and challenged them in a lengthy feud. After failing to regain the belts, the duo eventually left the WWF in 1985 and reappeared in Pro Wrestling USA (NWA/AWA) where they had a dream match vs the Road Warriors. The bout ended in a Double DQ .

Sika reappeared for a lengthy run in the WWF from 1986 to 1988, now managed by Mr. Fuji, performing both in singles competition and as a tag team (partnered with Kamala). Kamala and Sika's biggest match as a tag team was a loss to the Can-Am Connection on Superstars of Wrestling. Sika also participated in the invitational battle royal that opened Wrestlemania IV. He was the second one eliminated.

Afa returned to WWF in 1991 and went on to manage his son, Samu and his nephew Fatu as The Headshrinkers. He left the WWF in 1995.

=== Later years (1985–1997) ===
After WWF and AWA they went to wrestle in the independent circuit from 1986 to 1991. In 1987 they made a few appearances in National Wrestling Federation.

On September 10, 1988, they lost to Jimmy Valiant and Rufus R. Jones by disqualification at the 15th WWC Aniversario in 1988 in Puerto Rico. In 1991, they split up and both men went their separate ways. Sika would retire from wrestling and trained wrestlers at the Wild Samoans Training Center. Afa managed The Headshrinkers in the WWF from 1992 to 1995. After WWF, Afa continued to train other wrestlers. In 1996 Afa, founded World Xtreme Wrestling based in Allentown, Pennsylvania.

On August 15, 1997, both men reunited for one night teaming with Disco Inferno, Gene Ligon and the Big Cheese as they defeated Ken Timbs, George Love, Jay Love, Gary Royal and Kane Adams at IWA Night of the Legends in Kannapolis, North Carolina.

== Post-tag team careers ==
During the late 1970s, Afa Anoaʻi opened the Wild Samoans Training Center, and the school's graduates include Paul Orndorff, Junkyard Dog, Luna Vachon, Michael P.S. Hayes, Yokozuna, Bam Bam Bigelow, Rikishi, Sherri Martel, Virgil, Billy Kidman, Gene Snitsky, Chris Kanyon and Batista. They also promoted live wrestling shows under the WXW banner.

In 2007, on the eve of WrestleMania 23, the Wild Samoans were inducted into the WWE Hall of Fame. They were inducted by their sons Samula and Matt Anoaʻi.

In 2013 and 2014 Afa came out of retirement to wrestle for his promotion World Xtreme Wrestling at age 71.

The pair appeared at the 2020 Hell in a Cell to celebrate Roman Reigns' victory over Jey Uso, Sika giving him the Ula Fala.

On June 25, 2024, Sika died at the age of 79, and then, on August 16, 2024, Afa died at the age of 81.

== Championships and accomplishments ==
- Continental Wrestling Association
  - AWA Southern Tag Team Championship (1 time)
- Gulf Coast Championship Wrestling
  - NWA Gulf Coast Tag Team Championship (2 times)
- Georgia Championship Wrestling
  - NWA National Tag Team Championship (1 time)
- International Wrestling Enterprise
  - IWA World Tag Team Championship (1 time)
- Mid-South Wrestling
  - Mid-South Tag Team Championship (3 times)
- NWA All-Star Wrestling
  - NWA Canadian Tag Team Championship (Vancouver version) (1 time)
- NWA Detroit
  - NWA World Tag Team Championship (Detroit version) (2 times)
- NWA Mid-America
  - NWA United States Tag Team Championship (Mid-America version) (1 time)
- Pro Wrestling Illustrated
  - PWI ranked them # 93 of the 100 best tag teams during the "PWI Years" in 2003.
- Professional Wrestling Hall of Fame
  - Class of 2012
- Southeastern Championship Wrestling
  - NWA Southern Tag Team Championship (Southern Division) (2 times)
- Stampede Wrestling
  - Stampede International Tag Team Championship (2 times)
- World Wrestling Council
  - WWC World Tag Team Championship (1 time)
- World Wrestling Federation / World Wrestling Entertainment
  - WWE Hall of Fame (Class of 2007)
  - WWF World Tag Team Championship (3 times)
