= Brad Armstrong (wrestler) =

American professional wrestler (1962-2012)

- Armstrong after winning the WCW Light Heavyweight Championship in 1992

Personal information
- Born: Robert Bradley James; June 15, 1962 Marietta, Georgia, U.S.
- Died: November 1, 2012 (aged 50) Kennesaw, Georgia, U.S.
- Spouse: Lori Jean Spranz (m. 1998)
- Children: 1
- Parent: Bob Armstrong (father)
- Family: Road Dogg (brother); Scott Armstrong (brother); Steve Armstrong (brother)

Professional wrestling career
- Ring name(s): Arachnaman; B.A. Badstreet; Buzzkill; Brad Armstrong; Candyman; Dos Hombres; Fantasia; Freedom Fighter; Mr. R Armstrong's Avenger
- Billed height: 6 ft 0 in (183 cm)
- Billed weight: 233 lb (106 kg)
- Billed from: Marietta, Georgia
- Trained by: Bob Armstrong
- Debut: July 4, 1980
- Retired: February 12, 2011

Robert Bradley James (June 15, 1962 – November 1, 2012), better known by his ring name, Brad Armstrong was an American professional wrestler best known for his appearances with the promotion World Championship Wrestling in the 1990s. He was the son of wrestler "Bullet Bob" Armstrong and brother to professional wrestlers Steve, Scott and Brian.

== Professional wrestling career ==
=== National Wrestling Alliance and World Championship Wrestling (1980–1995) ===
Brad Armstrong began his career three weeks after graduating from Wheeler High School, wrestling his first match on July 4, 1980, at the age of 18. In 1984, he moved to the Georgia territory of the National Wrestling Alliance (NWA), Georgia Championship Wrestling. During this time, Armstrong began teaming with "White Lightning" Tim Horner. He was also involved in an angle with Tommy Rich, who was feuding with Ted DiBiase. After Rich lost to DiBiase in a "loser leaves wrestling" match, he put on a mask and came back as Mr. R, who DiBiase insisted was really Rich. On February 18, during a TV match for DiBiase's NWA National Heavyweight Championship, Rich visited announcer Gordon Solie and DiBiase unmasked Mr R, only to find that it was actually Armstrong, who pinned DiBiase to win the championship.

Armstrong also held the NWA National Tag Team Championship twice that year, once with his father, and once with Horner. They returned to Southeastern Championship Wrestling in 1985, before joining the NWA's Mid-Atlantic territory, Jim Crockett Promotions, in 1986. In the summer, Brad toured Japan for All Japan Pro Wrestling, taking part in a tournament to determine the inaugural World Junior Heavyweight Champion, but lost to Hiro Saito in the finals. At Starrcade '86: The Skywalkers on November 27, Armstrong faced Jimmy Garvin, but their match ended in a draw. He then moved to Bill Watts' Universal Wrestling Federation (then known as Mid-South Wrestling). On December 5, he defeated Ernie Ladd to win the Mid-South North American Heavyweight Championship, before losing it to DiBiase on January 16, 1985.

==== Lightning Express (1987–1990) ====
In early 1987, Armstrong reunited with Horner, forming a tag team known as The Lightning Express. On May 17, they defeated Sting and Rick Steiner to win the UWF Tag Team Championship. At The Great American Bash on July 4, they successfully defended the championship against Angel of Death and Big Bubba Rogers. They lost the titles to The Sheepherders (Butch Miller and Luke Williams) on October 16. The Lightning Express went back to JCP (which became World Championship Wrestling in November 1988) after the UWF was bought out by Crockett, but were not pushed, and Horner left for the WWF in late 1988. On the August 4, 1990, edition of WCW Saturday Night, Armstrong announced he would be forming a new tandem with Doug Furnas. However, Furnas left the company shortly thereafter, leaving Armstrong to continue his Lightning Express partnership with Horner.

==== Various Gimmicks and Cruiserweight Champion (1990–1995) ====
A month later, Armstrong went back into singles competition as The Candyman, dressed in red and white tights and handing out candy to fans during his entrances. He received a significant push in the new WCW, developing an undefeated streak by pinning the likes of Dutch Mantell, Buddy Landell, and James Earl Wright. At Halloween Havoc on October 27, Armstrong defeated J.W. Storm, a recent addition to WCW who was also on an undefeated streak. On November 15, The Iron Sheik upset The Candyman at a house show in Kansas City, ending his undefeated streak. At Clash of Champions XXIII on November 20, The Candyman lost to the debuting Big Cat after the referee stopped the match.

By January 1991, Armstrong dropped the Candyman gimmick and reunited with Horner, facing The Fabulous Freebirds in a match that ended in a double disqualification. At SuperBrawl I on May 19, Armstrong helped the Freebirds capture the vacant WCW United States Tag Team Championship from the Young Pistols, becoming Fantasia, the third member of the Freebirds under a mask and covered in black feathers. His name was quickly changed to Badstreet to prevent legal action from Disney. The three Freebirds then won the WCW World Six-Man Tag Team Championship while Hayes and Garvin held the WCW United States Tag Team Championship.

In September 1991, Armstrong began to tour Japan with New Japan Pro-Wrestling. Later that year, Armstrong was given another masked gimmick, Arachnaman, who bore such a strong resemblance to Spider-Man that Marvel Comics threatened legal action, causing WCW to drop the character in the span of three months. On July 5, 1992, Armstrong defeated Scotty Flamingo to win the WCW Light Heavyweight Championship (also known as the second incarnation of the NWA World Junior Heavyweight Championship and the first incarnation of the WCW Cruiserweight Championship). He soon injured his knee during a tour of Japan in a match against The Great Muta in Sapporo, and was stripped of the title at the Clash of the Champions XX. He returned weeks later, and remained with the company until early 1995.

=== Smoky Mountain Wrestling and United States Wrestling Association (1995–1996) ===
In June 1995, Armstrong joined Smoky Mountain Wrestling. He would split his time between SMW in Knoxville and the United States Wrestling Association (USWA) in Memphis, winning the USWA Heavyweight Championship once and the SMW Heavyweight Championship twice during his stay. After SMW folded in December 1995, Armstrong continued wrestling regularly for the USWA.

=== Return to World Championship Wrestling (1996–2001) ===
Armstrong eventually returned to WCW in February 1996. At Slamboree on May 19, Armstrong unsuccessfully challenged Dean Malenko for the WCW World Cruiserweight Championship. In the summer of 1997, he turned heel, changing his look, sporting short hair and a goatee, and developing a bad attitude and mean streak. By the end of the year, he developed a string of losses, which he blamed on the "Armstrong Curse". On February 22, 1998, he lost to Goldberg at SuperBrawl VIII during Goldberg's undefeated streak.

In 1999, he was repackaged as "B.A.", a member of The No Limit Soldiers stable. After the group disbanded, he began a feud with Berlyn, who attacked Armstrong's brother Scott and badmouthed the United States of America. On October 24, at Halloween Havoc, Armstrong defeated Berlyn. After Halloween Havoc, Vince Russo forced Armstrong to find a gimmick, eventually becoming "Buzzkill", a hippie with a Tie-dye shirt and a takeoff of his brother Brian's gimmick, Road Dogg.

In March 2000, Armstrong injured his knee in an accident backstage at a WCW Thunder taping in Fairfax, Virginia, severely injuring his knee, where he was ran over by Juventud Guerrera and Psychosis. After going through knee surgery, his WCW contract expired as the company was bought by WWF in 2001 and retired.

=== Independent circuit (2004–2011) ===
Armstrong came out of retirement in 2004 and wrestled on the independent circuit. He started teaming with his dad and his brother Scott, winning several tag team championships. On February 19, 2005, while working for Exodus Wrestling, he defeated George South to win the EWA Heavyweight Championship. The Armstrongs feuded with the Midnight Express over the following years, both in singles and tag team competition. On November 6, 2010, Armstrong teamed with Ricky Morton to win the NWA Mid-Atlantic Tag Team Championship, defeating Chris Hamrick and Jeff Lewis. His last wrestling match occurred at A Nightmare To Remember on February 12, 2011, where he was defeated by Kyle Matthews.

=== World Wrestling Entertainment (2006–2012) ===
On September 15, 2006, Armstrong signed a contract with World Wrestling Entertainment and began wrestling at ECW brand house shows against Eric Pérez and acting as a trainer to the younger members of the roster. In December, around the time rumors of ECW color commentator Tazz leaving the company began to circulate, Armstrong began to make sporadic appearances as a "guest commentator" on the brand. The three-man booth did not last and Armstrong resumed his role as a producer. While working as a producer for WWE, Armstrong continued to wrestle for various independent promotions in the Southeast. At the same time, Armstrong worked at a health store in Marietta and volunteered at Shiloh Hills Christian School in Kennesaw, performing various functions including serving as field trip monitor and assisting with car duty on campus.

== Personal life and death ==
James married his wife Lori Jean Spranz on October 17, 1998. Together, they had one daughter, Jillian.

On November 1, 2012, Armstrong was found dead at his home in Kennesaw, Georgia after seeing his physician the previous week for an undisclosed medical issue. He was 50 years old. His former Lightning Express tag team partner and best friend Tim Horner speculated that he died of a heart attack, which was confirmed by his brother Scott in a 2022 interview. Eulogizing Armstrong, Jim Ross described him as "one of the more talented in-ring performers I've ever worked with...one of the most underrated all-time greats ever in the business."

== Championships and accomplishments ==
- Championship Wrestling from Florida
  - NWA Florida Global Tag Team Championship (1 time) – with Terry Allen
- Exodus Wrestling
  - Exodus Wrestling Heavyweight Championship (1 time)
- Georgia Championship Wrestling
  - NWA National Heavyweight Championship (2 times)
  - NWA National Tag Team Championship (2 times) – with Bob Armstrong (1) and Tim Horner (1)
- Mid-South Wrestling / Universal Wrestling Federation
  - Mid-South North American Championship (1 time)
  - UWF World Tag Team Championship (1 time) – with Tim Horner
- NWA Rocky Top
  - NWA Rocky Top Tag Team Championship (1 time) – with Ricky Morton
- Mid-Atlantic Championship Wrestling
  - MACW Tag Team Championship (1 time) – with Ricky Morton
- Pro Wrestling Illustrated
  - Rookie of the Year (1982)
  - Ranked No. 63 of the top 500 singles wrestlers in the PWI 500 in 1992
  - Ranked No. 270 out of the 500 best singles wrestlers of the PWI Years in 2003
- Southeastern Championship Wrestling
  - NWA Southeastern Continental Heavyweight Championship (3 times)
  - NWA Southeastern Tag Team Championship (5 times) – with Bob Armstrong (3), Scott Armstrong (1), and The Shadow (Norvell Austin) (1)
  - NWA Southeastern United States Junior Heavyweight Championship (3 time)
- Smoky Mountain Wrestling
  - SMW Heavyweight Championship (2 times)
- Tennessee Mountain Wrestling
  - TMW Tag Team Championship (1 time) – with Scott Armstrong
- United States Wrestling Association
  - USWA Heavyweight Championship (1 time)
- World Championship Wrestling
  - WCW Light Heavyweight Championship (1 time)
  - WCW World Six-Man Tag Team Championship (1 time) – with Michael Hayes and Jimmy Garvin
- Wrestling Observer Newsletter
  - Most Underrated Wrestler (1987)
  - Rookie of the Year (1981) shared with Brad Rheingans
