= UWF Tag Team Championship =

Professional wrestling tag team championship

Details
- Promotion: Mid-South Wrestling (1979-1986); Universal Wrestling Federation (1986-1987)
- Date established: September 28, 1979
- Date retired: November 26, 1987

Other name
- Mid-South Tag Team Championship
Statistics
- First champions: Mike George and Bob Sweetan
- Final champions: The Sheepherders (Butch Miller and Luke Williams)
- Most reigns: (As a tag team) The Rock 'n' Roll Express, The Samoans, Junkyard Dog and Dick Murdoch (3 times) (As individual) Junkyard Dog (8 times)
- Longest reign: Junkyard Dog and Mr. Olympia (175 days)
- Shortest reign: Junkyard Dog and Dick Murdoch (1 hour)

In professional wrestling, the UWF Tag Team Championship was a tag team championship contested in the Universal Wrestling Federation (UWF) and its predecessor, Mid-South Wrestling. The title was established in 1979 as the Mid-South Tag Team Championship, renamed the UWF Tag Team Championship in 1986, and abandoned the following year when the UWF was acquired by Jim Crockett Promotions.

== Title history ==
Key
No.	Overall reign number
Reign	Reign number for the specific team—reign numbers for the individuals are in parentheses, if different
Days	Number of days held

No.	Champion	Championship change			Reign statistics		Notes	Ref.
No.	Champion	Date	Event	Location	Reign	Days	Notes	Ref.
1	Mike George and Bob Sweetan	September 28, 1979	MSW show	Shreveport, Louisiana	1	45	Won battle royal.	
2	Bill Watts and Buck Robley	November 12, 1979	MSW show	N/A	1	25		
3	The Fabulous Freebirds (Michael Hayes and Terry Gordy)	December 7, 1979	MSW show	Shreveport, Louisiana	1	94		
4	Ted DiBiase and Paul Orndorff	March 10, 1980	MSW show	New Orleans, Louisiana	1	12		
5	The Fabulous Freebirds (Michael Hayes and Terry Gordy)	March 22, 1980	MSW show	Shreveport, Louisiana	2	15		
6	Junkyard Dog and Buck Robley (2)	April 6, 1980	MSW show	Monroe, Louisiana	1	64		
7	The Fabulous Freebirds (Terry Gordy (3) and Buddy Roberts)	June 9, 1980	MSW show	New Orleans, Louisiana	1	102		
8	Junkyard Dog (2) and Terry Orndorff	September 15, 1980	MSW show	Shreveport, Louisiana	1	46		
9	Ernie Ladd and Leroy Brown	October 31, 1980	MSW show	Shreveport, Louisiana	1	90		
10	Junkyard Dog (3) and Killer Karl Kox	January 29, 1981	MSW show	Biloxi, Mississippi	1	3		
11	Ernie Ladd and Leroy Brown	February 1, 1981	MSW show	Lake Charles, Louisiana	2	57		
12	Junkyard Dog (4) and Dick Murdoch	March 30, 1981	MSW show	N/A	1	0		
—	Vacated	March 30, 1981	—	—	—	—	Stripped due to Bill Watts not being an acceptable referee.	
13	Super Destroyer and The Grappler	April 18, 1981	MSW show	New Orleans, Louisiana	1	9	Defeated Junkyard Dog and Dick Murdoch.	
14	Junkyard Dog (5) and Dick Murdoch	April 27, 1981	MSW show	New Orleans, Louisiana	2	(Note: The exact date that Junkyard Dog and Murdoch lost the championship has not been documented, which means that their reign lasted between 35 and 64 days.)		
15	The Samoans (Afa and Sika)	June 1981	MSW show	N/A	1	(Note: The exact date that the Wild Samoans won and lost the championship has not been documented, which means that their reign lasted between 1 day and 29 days.)		
16	Junkyard Dog (6) and Dick Murdoch	June 1981	MSW show	N/A	3	(Note: The exact date that Junkyard Dog and Murdoch lost the championship has not been documented, which means that their reign lasted between 26 and 55 days.)		
17	The Samoans (Afa and Sika)	July 26, 1981	MSW show	Monroe, Louisiana	2	81		
18	Junkyard Dog (7) and Mike George (2)	October 15, 1981	MSW show	Jackson, Mississippi	1	139		
19	The Samoans (Afa and Sika)	March 3, 1982	MSW show	Shreveport, Louisiana	3	63		
20	Junkyard Dog (8) and Mr. Olympia	May 5, 1982	MSW show	Jackson, Mississippi	1	175		
21	The Rat Pack (Ted DiBiase (2) and Matt Borne)	October 27, 1982	MSW show	Shreveport, Louisiana	1	136		
22	Mr. Wrestling II and Tiger Conway Jr.	March 12, 1983	MSW show	Houston, Texas	1	26		
23	Ted DiBiase (3) and Mr. Olympia (2)	April 13, 1983	MSW show	Shreveport, Louisiana	1	102		
24	Magnum T. A. and Hacksaw Jim Duggan	July 24, 1983	MSW show	Tulsa, Oklahoma	1	80		
25	Butch Reed and Jim Neidhart	October 12, 1983	MSW show	Shreveport, Louisiana	1	74		
26	Magnum T. A. (2) and Mr. Wrestling II (2)	December 25, 1983	MSW show	New Orleans, Louisiana	1	79	This was a no disqualification steel cage match in which if Mr. Wrestling II's team lost, Mr. Wrestling II would have to unmask. Magnum T.A pinned a distracted Jim Neidhart to win the titles. Highlights of this match aired on Mid-South TV on December 31st, 1983.	
27	The Midnight Express (Bobby Eaton and Dennis Condrey)	March 13, 1984	MSW show	Lafayette, Louisiana	1	50		
28	The Rock 'n' Roll Express (Ricky Morton and Robert Gibson)	May 2, 1984	MSW show	Shreveport, Louisiana	1	21		
29	The Midnight Express (Bobby Eaton and Dennis Condrey)	May 23, 1984	MSW show	Shreveport, Louisiana	2	131	Jim Cornette used an "ether rag" on Robert Gibson to win the titles, similar to an angle used in 1980 in Georgia Championship Wrestling for the Georgia tag team titles.	
30	The Rock 'n' Roll Express (Ricky Morton and Robert Gibson)	October 1, 1984	MSW show	New Orleans, Louisiana	2	63		
31	Ted DiBiase (4) and Hercules Hernandez	December 3, 1984	MSW show	New Orleans, Louisiana	1	22		
32	The Rock 'n' Roll Express (Ricky Morton and Robert Gibson)	December 25, 1984	MSW Show	New Orleans, Louisiana	3	129		
33	Ted DiBiase (5) and Steve Williams	May 3, 1985	MSW Show	Houston, Texas	1	117		
34	Al Perez and Wendell Cooley	August 28, 1985	MSW Show	Shreveport, Louisiana	1	75	Defeat Williams and Bob Sweetan, substituting Ted DiBiase.	
35	Eddie Gilbert and The Nightmare	November 11, 1985	MSW Show	New Orleans, Louisiana	1	45		
36	Ted DiBiase (6) and Steve Williams	December 26, 1985	MSW Show	Biloxi, Mississippi	2	80	Championship renamed "UWF Tag Team Championship" in 1986	
37	The Sheepherders (Butch Miller and Luke Williams)	March 16, 1986	UWF show	Oklahoma City, Oklahoma	1	14		
38	The Fantastics (Bobby Fulton and Tommy Rogers)	March 30, 1986	UWF show	Tulsa, Oklahoma	1	112		
39	Eddie Gilbert (2) and Sting	July 20, 1986	UWF show	Tulsa, Oklahoma	1	28		
—	Vacated	August 17, 1986	—	—	—	—	Held up after a match against The Fantastics.	
40	Eddie Gilbert (3) and Sting	August 31, 1986	UWF show	Tulsa, Oklahoma	2	27	Won the rematch.	
41	The Fantastics (Bobby Fulton and Tommy Rogers)	September 27, 1986	UWF show	Tulsa, Oklahoma	2	29		
42	John Tatum and Jack Victory	October 26, 1986	UWF show	Tulsa, Oklahoma	1	14		
43	Bill Irwin and Leroy Brown (3)	November 9, 1986	UWF show	Tulsa, Oklahoma	1	48		
44	Terry Taylor and Jim Duggan (2)	December 27, 1986	UWF show	Ft. Worth, Texas	1	27		
—	Vacated	January 23, 1987	—	—	—	—	Duggan lost loser-leaves-town match to One Man Gang.	
45	Terry Taylor (2) and Chris Adams	February 7, 1987	UWF show	Ft. Worth, Texas	1	64		
46	Sting (3) and Rick Steiner	April 12, 1987	UWF show	Atlanta, Georgia	1	35		
47	The Lightning Express (Brad Armstrong and Tim Horner)	May 17, 1987	UWF show	Tulsa, Oklahoma	1	152		
48	The Sheepherders (Butch Miller and Luke Williams)	October 16, 1987	UWF show	Kansas City, Missouri	2	41		
—	Deactivated	November 26, 1987	—	—	—	—	Title abandoned due to purchase of UWF by Jim Crockett Promotions	

== See also ==
- Universal Wrestling Federation
- NWA Tri-State Tag Team Championship
- GWF Tag Team Championship
