= Dale Veasey =

American professional wrestler (born 1960)

Personal information
- Born: Todd Dale Veasey; May 20, 1960 (age 66) Orlando, Florida, U.S.

Professional wrestling career
- Ring name(s): The Alaskan Hunter; Dale Veasey; The Hunter; Lt. James Earl Wright
- Billed height: 5 ft 8 in (1.73 m)
- Billed weight: 235 lb (107 kg)
- Billed from: Atlanta, Georgia
- Debut: 1982
- Retired: 1996

Todd Dale Veasey (born May 20, 1960) is a retired American professional wrestler, better known by his ring names Dale Veasey and Lt. James Earl Wright, who competed in North American regional promotions including the Mid-South region and the National Wrestling Alliance, particularly the Georgia and Florida territories, as well as brief stints in the World Wrestling Federation and World Championship Wrestling, most notably as one half of the tag team State Patrol with Buddy Lee Parker during the 1990s.

He would also have a successful career teaming with Bob Brown in international promotions including Continental Championship Wrestling, Stampede Wrestling and the World Wrestling Council (WWC).

== Professional wrestling career ==
=== Early career (1982-1985) ===
Dale Veasey made his professional debut in early 1982, beginning his career in Georgia and Florida. Later that year however, he disappeared from the scene and did not reappear until February 1984, in Georgia Championship Wrestling. The on-air reason given for his hiatus was that he had been in a serious automobile accident, breaking his ankle, jaw, right arm, and also suffering two skull fractures. On his return he was heavier than when last seen in 1982, but spent the next few months trimming down. Veasey was still with the promotion when Black Saturday occurred, at which point he transition to other territories, losing several singles matches to Tim Horner, Shawn Michaels, Terry Taylor and Iceman Parsons while in the Mid-South territory in January 1985 and spending most of the year wrestling in Florida Championship Wrestling facing veterans such as Wahoo McDaniel, Rip Rogers and Hector Guerrero.

While in Texas All-Star Wrestling, he also defeated Terry Daniels in a tournament final to win the vacant TASW Junior Heavyweight Championship in San Antonio, Texas on September 2, 1985 holding the title for four months before leaving the area.

=== The Alaskan Hunters & State Patrol (1986-1989) ===
The following year, Veasey underwent another physical transformation into Road Warriors-inspired, The Hunter. He spent most of 1986/1987 wrestling as either The Hunter in singles competition or with tag-team partner Bob Brown as The Alaskan Hunters, going on to win the WWC North American Tag Team Championship with Brown defeating Miguelito Perez & Tony Atlas in San Juan, Puerto Rico on June 20, 1987. After defeating WWC World Tag Team Champions Mark & Chris Youngblood on August 26, the two would briefly hold both the World and North American tag team titles before losing the World titles back to the Youngbloods September 20, 1987. After the North American titles were abandoned by the promotion in November, Veasey and Brown would leave the promotion by the end of the year.

Early in 1989, Veasey and Brown spent some time in the World Wrestling Federation and, later, a very short spell in Stampede Wrestling, but by the end of 1989 Veasey was in World Championship Wrestling as 'Lieutenant James Earl Wright' along with 'Sergeant Buddy Lee Parker', his tag team partner in the State Patrol (which first formed while both were in Stampede).

=== World Championship Wrestling (1989-1996) ===
Making their debut in late 1989, the State Patrol substituted for the Samoan Swat Team and were defeated by the NWA/WCW US Tag Team Champions The Steiner Brothers at Chicago’s UIC Pavilion on September 30 and also faced Ricky Morton & Tommy Rich on December 14, 1990.

During 1991, Wright and Parker regularly appeared on televised shows including WCW Power Hour and WCW Saturday Night. After losing to Brian Pillman in a singles match on WCW Power Hour on January 26, both he and Parker brawled with Pillman afterwards with Pillman getting the upper hand. This would lead to a brief feud which resulted in a rematch at Clash of the Champions XIV on January 30 with Wright again losing to Pillman.

Although having success against preliminary wrestlers in early 1991, Veasey and Parker teamed with Big Cat in a losing effort against the then WCW World Six-Man Tag Team Champions Junkyard Dog, Ricky Morton & Tommy Rich at WrestleWar ‘91 on February 24, 1991. He would also lose a series of single matches to Junkyard Dog and Dustin Rhodes during the next two months, before losing to Big Van Vader in a handicap match with Joe Cazana on April 24, 1991.

The following year, Veasey lost to "Hacksaw" Jim Duggan in a match for the WCW United States Heavyweight Championship on November 20 and, with Sgt. Buddy Lee Parker, lost to then WCW World Tag Team Champions The American Males on December 7, 1994.

Appearing on WCW Saturday Night during early 1995, he lost singles matches against Sting, Brian Pillman and Renegade. Although losing to the American Males on August 21, they would later defeat Col. Robert Lee Parker's Stud Stable (Bunkhouse Buck & "Dirty" Dick Slater) during WCW Monday Nitro on September 18. Losing to The Nasty Boys on October 11 and Sting & Ric Flair on October 25, he and Parker would later appear in a 60-man Battle Royal where both he and his partner were eliminated by Cobra at World War Three '95 on November 11, 1995. After being eliminated, Veasey/Wright pulled Cobra out of the ring eliminating him from the battle royal as well, however nothing came from this.

The following year, the State Patrol lost a match against Harlem Heat on WCW Saturday Night in Rome, Georgia on March 30, 1996.

The State Patrol also toured Japan several times during the 1990s.

== Retirement ==
Veasey retired from active competition although he has since wrestled in the Georgia-based Columbus Championship Wrestling in January 2002.

== Championships and accomplishments ==
- Deep South Wrestling
  - DSW United States Championship (1 time, only champion)
- Texas All-Star Wrestling
  - TASW USA Junior Heavyweight Championship (1 time)
- World Wrestling Council
  - WWC World Tag Team Championship (1 time) - with Bob Brown
  - WWC North American Tag Team Championship (1 time) - with Bob Brown
  - WWC Caribbean Tag Team Championship (1 time) - with Sgt. Billy Joe Barber
