= Samu (wrestler) =

American professional wrestler (born 1963)

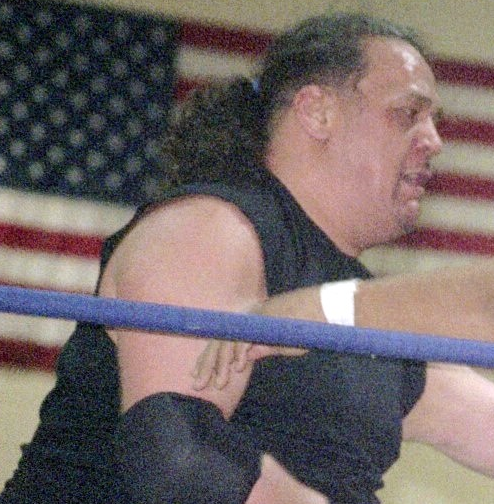
- Samu in 2006

Personal information
- Born: Samuel Fred Anoaʻi; May 29, 1963 (age 63) San Francisco, California, U.S.
- Spouse: Melissa Fritz
- Children: 5 (including Lance Anoa'i)
- Family: Anoaʻi

Professional wrestling career
- Ring name(s): The Great Samu; Headshrinker Samu; Sam Anoaʻi; Sammy Silk; Sam the Samoan; Samu; Samula; Super Star Tiger; The Tahitian Prince; The Wild Samoan
- Billed height: 6 ft 4 in (193 cm)
- Billed weight: 260 lb (118 kg)
- Billed from: "The Isle of Samoa"
- Trained by: Afa; Sika
- Debut: 1981
- Retired: February 10, 2022

Samuel Fred Anoaʻi (born May 29, 1963) is an American retired professional wrestler, better known by his ring name Samu. He is signed to WWE on a Legends contract. He is best known for his appearances with World Championship Wrestling (WCW), Extreme Championship Wrestling (ECW), and New Japan Pro-Wrestling (NJPW) in the 1980s and 1990s.

== Professional wrestling career ==
=== Early career (1981–1983) ===
Anoaʻi had his first professional match at age 14 under the supervision of his father Afa and his uncle Sika. He later ended up going pro in 1981 at age 17.

=== World Wrestling Federation (1983–1984) ===
In 1983, Anoaʻi began appearing in the World Wrestling Federation (WWF) when Sika (part of the reigning WWF Tag Team Champions) was injured on March 12, 1983. Known simply as "Samula", he helped The Wild Samoans defend the tag team championship a handful of times while Sika recovered. After Sika returned, Samula remained in the WWF, backing up his father and uncle. In January 1984, he received a match with former WWF World Heavyweight Champion Bob Backlund, but ended up losing by disqualification. It was around this time he started being announced as Samu instead of Samula, though Gorilla Monsoon still referred to him as Samula. During the summer of 1984, Samula turned face after the Wild Samoans left the WWF. Samula twice teamed with Hulk Hogan during WWF's tours in Japan, both times facing Japanese legends Antonio Inoki and Tatsumi Fujinami. These matches were among the last matches Samula wrestled in the WWF before leaving in January 1985.

=== Various promotions (1984–1989) ===
After the WWF Samula joined up with Gino Brito and Dino Bravo's International Wrestling territory based in Montreal. In Montreal, he was given the name The Great Samu and was managed by Floyd Creatchman, who used the Samoan to target the top faces in the territory. He eventually feuded with the top babyface in the territory, Dino Bravo, defeating him for the International Heavyweight Championship on June 30, 1986. Samu held on to the title until November 3, 1986, when he was beaten by David Schultz. When International Wrestling closed a few months later, Samu went looking for warmer weather.

While working in Montreal, Samu hung out with his cousin Solofa Fatu, who was working in the area as the friendly babyface "Prince Alofa". When the Montreal territory closed up, the two cousins signed with the World Wrestling Council in Puerto Rico and became The Samoan Swat Team: Samu and Fatu. The team adopted the “Samoan savage" gimmick that had made their fathers so well known and feared throughout the wrestling world, working barefeet and never spoke English on camera. The team became the first ever WWC Caribbean Tag-Team Champions on November 7, 1987, when they beat Invader I and Invader III. The duo held the titles for just over a month before dropping them to Mark Youngblood and Chris Youngblood before leaving the promotion.

Samu and Fatu next appeared in Texas, working for Fritz Von Erich's World Class Championship Wrestling promotion. The storyline was that Buddy Roberts brought the team in to fight his fights against the Von Erich Family and former Fabulous Freebirds partner Michael Hayes. The SST was given a big push right away; presented as an unstoppable force the team was even allowed to beat hometown heroes Kerry and Kevin Von Erich for the WCCW Tag-Team Titles on August 12, 1988. The Samoans remained undefeated in WCCW until they came up against Roberts’ former partner Michael Hayes and Hayes’ new partner, “Do It To It" Steve Cox on September 12. The duo was not without the gold for long as they recaptured the title only four days later. Hayes and Cox beat the Samoan Swat Team for the title once again on October 15, 1988 but this time they only held the gold for two days before they lost it back to the SST. On September 12, 1988, The Samoan Swat Team became double champions as they beat "Hollywood" John Tatum and Jimmy Jack Funk for the WCWA Texas Tag Team Championship. The Samoan Swat Team made their Pay Per View debut at AWA Superclash III, the first (and only) PPV that the American Wrestling Association ever presented. The Samoans successfully defended their WCCW Tag-Team titles against Michael Hayes and Steve Cox. In the beginning of 1989, the Samoans left WCCW, forcing both tag-team titles to be vacated due to the sudden departure.

=== World Championship Wrestling (1989–1990) ===
The Samoan Swat Team signed with World Championship Wrestling and was brought in as manager Paul E. Dangerously's replacements for the "Original" Midnight Express who had left the promotion. The Samoans also took over the "Original" Midnight Express’ feud with the Midnight Express beating the team at Clash of the Champions VI on April 2, 1989. At The 1989 Great American Bash the Samoans teamed with former rival Michael Hayes, Terry Gordy and Jimmy Garvin losing a War Games Match to The Road Warriors, the Midnight Express and Steve Williams. In the fall of 1989, Paul E. Dangerously was phased out and the Samoans were given a new manager: "The Big Kahuna" Oliver Humperdink. Their ranks were also bolstered by the addition of The Samoan Savage who is Fatu's brother. The Samoans started to lose more and more matches as 1989 drew to a close, but their fortunes appeared to be changing due to the injury to Sid Vicious. Because Vicious was injured The Skyscrapers had to pull out of the "Iron Team Tournament" at Starrcade 1989 and the Samoan Swat Team were chosen to be their replacements – Fatu and the Samoan Savage with no explanation of why the more experienced Samu was not chosen. For the remainder of the Samoan Swat Team's time in WCW Fatu and the Samoan Savage competed under the name while Samu made a few singles appearances.

=== Various promotions (1990–1992) ===
After leaving WCW in the summer of 1990 the Samoan Swat Team worked for a number of independent promotions in the US, Europe and Japan, often teaming up with family member Rodney Anoaʻi who competed as "Kokina Maximus". The family worked for the Universal Wrestling Association in 1991 with Fatu, Kokina and The Samoan Savage winning the UWA Trios Tag-Team titles and holding it for just under 2 months. They also made a headline appearance on the UWA's 16th anniversary show losing to Dos Caras, El Canek and Mil Máscaras.

=== World Wrestling Federation (1992–1994, 1995–1996) ===
In July 1992, Samu and Fatu signed up with the World Wrestling Federation, managed by Samu's father Afa. The team changed their name to the Headshrinkers but their gimmick remained the same, Samoan wildmen. Rodney Anoaʻi also signed with the WWF but he was repackaged as "Yokozuna" and the family ties between him and the Samoans was not mentioned on air. The team first made their presence known when they helped Money Incorporated beat the Natural Disasters to win the WWF World Tag Team Championship. Early in their run with the WWF, the Headshrinkers feuded with the Natural Disasters and the recently formed High Energy. Between 1992 and the early part of 1994, the Headshrinkers maintained a position in the middle of the tag-team division, occasionally challenging for the titles and making sporadic PPV appearances feuding with teams like The Smoking Gunns and Men on a Mission. The Headshrinkers assisted their relative Yokozuna in a casket match against The Undertaker at the 1994 Royal Rumble. In April 1994 the Headshrinkers turned face and challenged then tag-team champions The Quebecers, and with the addition of manager Lou Albano the team won the gold on April 26, 1994. At King of the Ring 1994 on June 19 the Headshrinkers successfully defended their tag-team titles against Yokozuna and Crush. Their run with the titles came to a surprising end on an untelevised card on August 28 where they lost the titles to Shawn Michaels and Diesel. The title change happened just one day before they were scheduled to defend against Irwin R. Schyster and Bam Bam Bigelow. Soon after the title change, Samu left the WWF to recover from injuries and was replaced by Sione. Samu would then work in the independent circuit.

After being away from the spotlight for a while Samu returned to the WWF in 1995. Samu along with his cousin Matt Anoaʻi were known as "The Samoan Gangster Party" with Samu being known as "Sammy the Silk" and Matt being "Big Matty Smalls". The two men did not wrestle for the WWF but watched Fatu from afar as the former Headshrinker tried to turn himself into a positive role model for kids on the street. The angle never went anywhere as the Samoan Gangster Party never got in the ring or confronted Fatu before he was repackaged and the whole angle was dropped. Samu and Tahitian Warrior did wrestle a few house shows against the Smoking Gunns in May 1996.

=== Extreme Championship Wrestling (1996) ===
In 1996 The Samoan Gangster Party worked for Extreme Championship Wrestling feuding mainly with The Gangstas in a short but intense war between the two "Gangsta" factions.

=== Later career (1996–2022) ===
After leaving ECW Samu worked for a number of independent organizations both as a singles wrestler and alongside Matt Anoaʻi who worked under names such as Matty Smalls and Rosey. winning titles in WWC and ISPW. On December 15, 1997, he made an appearance in WCW with his cousin Sam Fatu losing to Curtis Thompson and Todd Champion in a dark match for Monday Night Nitro. Samu also became a regular in his father's World Xtreme Wrestling Promotion and has held the WXW World title five times. Samu won the New World Wrestling Undisputed Brass Knuckles Championship on October 28, 2006 and is a part-time instructor at his father's and uncle's “Wild Samoan Training Facility" On March 31, 2007, Samu and Rosey inducted The Wild Samoans, Afa and Sika into the WWE Hall of Fame.

On November 29, 2014 Samu and his son Lance Anoaʻi teamed with former RAGE partner Quinn Magnum in a six-man tag match against Payton Graham, Stryder and Jack Pollock. Samu was also inducted into PWX's Circle Of Respect, its version of a hall of fame.

=== Retirement (2022–present) ===
On February 10, 2022, Samu signed a "Legends" contract with WWE.

He came out of retirement on April 5, 2024 teaming with his son, Lance, defeating the Full Blooded Italians, Little Guido and Tommy Rich at BCW A Tribute To The Extreme 2 in Philadelphia.

== Personal life ==
Anoaʻi belongs to an extended Samoan American family of professional wrestlers. He is married to Melissa Fritz. They have five children, one of whom, Lance, is also a professional wrestler.

On October 24, 2018, Anoaʻi announced that he had stage 4 liver cancer and was waiting for a transplant.

== Championships and accomplishments ==
- Lutte Internationale
  - Canadian International Heavyweight Championship (1 time)
  - NWW Undisputed Brass Knuckles Championship (1 time)
- National Wrestling League
  - NWL Tag Team Championship with John Rambo (2)
- World Class Wrestling Association
  - WCWA World Tag Team Championship (3 times) – with Fatu
- World Wrestling Council
  - WWC Caribbean Tag Team Championship (1 time) – with Fatu
- World Wrestling Federation
  - WWF Tag Team Championship (1 time) – with Fatu
- World Xtreme Wrestling
  - Hall of Fame (2013)

== See also ==
- Anoaʻi family
- The Headshrinkers
- The Samoan Gangster Team
- The Samoan SWAT Team
- The Wild Samoans
