= Tim Horner =

American professional wrestler (born 1959)

- Horner looking after a horse at an Atlanta-area rodeo arena in 1984

Personal information
- Born: Timothy Lee Horner; August 19, 1959 (age 67) Morristown, Tennessee, U.S.

Professional wrestling career
- Ring name(s): Tim Horner; Star Blazer; Kendo the Samurai
- Billed height: 5 ft 10 in (178 cm)
- Billed weight: 242 lb (110 kg)
- Billed from: Knoxville, Tennessee
- Trained by: Rick Connors; Jack Brisco; Jerry Brisco
- Debut: 1978
- Retired: 2013

Hamblen County Commissioner from the 13th District
- Incumbent
- Assumed office 2018

Timothy Lee Horner (born August 19, 1959) is an American retired professional wrestler, who was one half of The Lightning Express with Brad Armstrong.

== Professional wrestling career ==
=== Early career (1978–1984) ===
Tim Horner started wrestling in 1978 in the Alabama territory. In 1980 he competed in Georgia Championship Wrestling, losing on March 15 on television to Dutch Mantell. His GCW run had him at the bottom of the card, as he lost to Ric Flair, Roberto Soto, Tommy Rich, and Kevin Sullivan. In May 1981 he traveled to Mid Atlantic Championship Wrestling, making his debut on May 14 in a draw with Tony Anthony. He then joined Southern Championship Wrestling, and on June 7, 1983, defeated Tony Russo in Knoxville, TN. As the year progressed Horner would make appearances in both SCW and MACW, and unsuccessfully challenged Les Thornton for the NWA World Junior Heavyweight Championship on August 29, 1981, on MACW television. Horner would continue to compete in MACW into 1982.

=== Jim Crockett Promotions (1984–1988) ===
Horner signed to Jim Crockett Promotions in 1984, and formed The Lightning Express with Brad Armstrong. They won the Universal Wrestling Federation tag team title in 1987, defeating Sting and Rick Steiner. They also won the National Wrestling Alliance's National Tag Team title. His final match for JCP came on August 28, 1988, when he faced Larry Zbyszko at a house show in Daytona Beach, FL.

=== Continental Wrestling Federation (1988) ===
Horner jumped to the Continental Wrestling Federation in September 1988, making his debut on September 4th at an event in Montgomery, Alabama when he teamed with Shane Douglas & Lord Humongous to face Ken Wayne, Nightmare Freddie (Doug Gilbert), & The Dirty White Boy. Horner would later face Dutch Mantell on September 23, defeating him via disqualification. On October 3, 1988, he competed in a tournament to crown the new CWF Heavyweight Champion, but was defeated in the first round by Jerry Stubbs. His final match came on October 30, when he teamed with Willie B. Hart against Jerry Stubbs & Tony Anthony.

=== World Wrestling Federation (1988–1989) ===
Tim Horner signed with WWF in late 1988, making his first appearance at a TV taping for WWF Superstars of Wrestling on November 16 in a match that would air on December 18. He faced Ted Dibiase and was defeated by him. He next appeared on Prime Time Wrestling, defeating Johnny K-9 via disqualification on December 19. A week later he competed once more on Prime Time in a match taped at the Boston Garden, this time falling to Mr. Perfect. He gained his first pinfall victory of his WWF tenure when he defeated Barry Horowitz at a house show in Vancouver on December 12. On televised matches he was used as a jobber in both singles and tag-team matches, while at house shows he was frequently victorious over other opening card opponents. In January 1989, he began a house show series against Danny Davis, defeating him on seven straight events before finally losing a match on February 6 in Grand Rapids, MI, against the former referee. Horner then moved on to another house show series, this time against long-time babyface Lanny Poffo as well as opening card heels Iron Mike Sharpe and Jose Estrada. Again, Horner was consistently victorious against this opposition.

On April 22, 1989, Horner faced Tom Magee, who had been newly repackaged as the heel "MegaMan". MegaMan Magee defeated Horner in their first encounter, and this began a new program for Horner where he went winless throughout the month of April and May. The two would carry their feud into Prime Time Wrestling on May 13, where Horner was defeated again. After the unsuccessful series ended, Horner was moved to another program, this time with Barry Horowitz. Here, the young wrestler was more successful and earned multiple victories over the heel Horowitz. On June 12, Horner defeated Horowitz on Prime Time Wrestling.

On June 25, 1989, he scored the biggest win of his nascent WWF career when he pinned Bolshevik tag-team wrestler Boris Zukhov at a house show Wheeling, WV. After dropping several matches to Greg Valentine in July, he scored another upset when he defeated nemesis Tom Magee at a house show in Medicine Hat, Alberta on July 2. On July 31, he gained another televised victory when he defeated Iron Mike Sharpe on Prime Time Wrestling. As the month ended, Horner scored several additional wins over MegaMan Magee, as well as Zukhov.

In August, the now red-hot Horner was moved to a house show series with Bad News Brown, where his momentum hit an abrupt stop where he was winless. He continued however to defeat Horowitz and Zukhov in other house show matches that month, and then faced Barry Windham in the latter's debut as "The Widowmaker" on the September 11, 1989 edition of WWF Superstars. On October 16, 1989, he wrestled former foe Lanny Poffo on Prime Time Wrestling; the latter having turned heel and now being known as "The Genius". On October 10, 1989, the World Wrestling Federation made their first appearance in the United Kingdom when they held a card in London; Horner wrestled on the opening match of the show when he teamed with Dale Wolfe & Al Perez in a losing effort against Marc Rocco, Dave Finlay, and Skully Murphy. On October 27, 1989, he pinned the returning Nikolai Volkoff. On October 28, 1989, he wrestled Bret Hart to a no contest when Horner suffered an injury mid match and could not continue. He would return from the injury on November 10, 1989, in what would be his final WWF match when he was defeated by Earthquake.

During his WWF tenure Horner was also frequently involved in dark match tryouts for numerous notable wrestlers. On April 26, 1989, he faced Kendo Nagaski in the latter's tryout, and on June 6 wrestled Kevin Kelly, who would eventually be signed three years later and become Nailz. On June 27, Horner faced The Big Steel Man in a dark match tryout in Niagara Falls, New York, with Steel Man ultimately being signed and becoming Tugboat. On September 21, he competed against Earthquake Evans in a dark match at a WWF Superstars taping in Cincinnati, OH, three months before John Tenta's debut.

=== World Championship Wrestling (1990–1991) ===
After rehabilitating from his injury, Horner returned to the National Wrestling Alliance as it was in the process of rebranding as World Championship Wrestling. His first match saw him team with The Italian Stallion & Joe DeFuria in a losing effort against Arn Anderson, Barry Windham, and Sid Vicious on the June 30, 1990 edition of World Championship Wrestling. While competing under his own monicker, Horner also debuted an alternate, masked persona called "The Starblazer" that was seemingly modeled after Owen Hart's former Blue Blazer gimmick. Wrestling as The Starblazer, he defeated Mark Kyle on NWA Worldwide on June 25, 1990. On the July 7th edition of World Championship Wrestling Horner (wrestling as himself) teamed with Tommy Rich to defeat The State Patrol. On the following day on NWA Main Event, the duo defeated Barry Horowitz & JD Wolf.

Later in July, Horner began teaming with Mike Rotundo with the new duo getting a shot at NWA World Tag-Team Champions Doom on the July 21st edition of NWA Pro. Doom was victorious, and Horner then teamed with Tommy Rich once more in an unsuccessful effort against NWA United States Tag-Team Champions The Midnight Express the next day on The Power Hour. On the house show circuit, Horner donned his mask and entered a series of matches with the newly arrived Bam Bam Bigelow, competing as "The Starblazer". and for Smoky Mountain Wrestling (SMW). On the July 28th edition of World Championship Wrestling he reformed his Lightning Express tag-team with former partner Brad Armstrong; the duo defeated Barry Windham & Arn Anderson via disqualification after Sid Vicious interfered. On the August 31st edition of The Power Hour, the Lightning Express would defeat The Midnight Express via disqualification after Bobby Eaton was caught throwing Horner over the top rope.

Wrestling as The Starblazer, he faced Barry Horowitz in numerous matches around the country on the house show circuit in August 1990.

On the September 8th edition of NWA Worldwide Horner teamed once more with Mike Rotundo. After the duo gained a victory over Mike Thor & Death Row 3260, they placed a challenge to the newly signed tag-team of The Master Blasters. They would also defeat The State Patrol on the same taping. However, Rotundo would not make the Clash of Champions XII show, instead it would be The Lightning Express who would face and be defeated by The Master Blasters. Rotundo & Horner teamed up again on the September 22nd edition of NWA Worldwide, defeating The Nasty Boys via disqualification. Following this, the duo entered a house show series with the Master Blasters but were held winless in numerous matches in September and October. On the September 30 edition of NWA Worldwide, NWA World Tag-Team Champions Doom defeated the team once more. On the October 26th edition of The Power Hour, Rotundo and Horner were defeated by Ric Flair & Arn Anderson. The team finally ended their losing streak the following day on World Championship Wrestling where they defeated The State Patrol.

On October 27, 1990, Horner participated in his first-ever PPV when he defeated Barry Horowitz in the dark match of Halloween Havoc 90 in Chicago, IL. On November 9, Horner gained a partial measure of revenge against the Master Blasters when he defeated Master Blaster Blade (Al Green) at a house show in Greenwood, SC. He would go on to score numerous victories against Blade on house shows around the country. On November 20, 1990, he appeared as Starblazer once more, this time at Clash of Champions XIII, where he was defeated by former partner Michael Wallstreet (the rebranded Mike Rotundo). On the November 24th edition of World Championship Wrestling he resumed his Lightning Express partnership with Brad Armstrong; the duo defeated The State Patrol.

Horner formed another tag-team in December 1990, this time with Allen Iron Eagle. The duo was defeated by The Master Blasters at a house show on December 5 in Sioux City, IA, and would lose to the Blasters in multiple other house show events. Horner & Eagle were defeated by the newly arrived Motor City Madman & The Big Cat (Mr. Hughes) on the December 22, 1990 edition of World Championship Wrestling. Horner rebounded to defeat Bobby Eaton in an upset on December 14, two seconds before the match would have ended in a fifteen-minute draw.

He began 1991 with a victory, defeating Moondog Rex at a house show in Greensboro, NC after hitting his opponent with his foe's own bone. His partnership with Armstrong resumed once more, and on the January 20, 1991 episode of World Championship Wrestling, The Fabulous Freebirds said that the Lightning Express could not "hang with them". The same day on The Main Event, the Lightning Express battled The Freebirds to a double disqualification. On the February 2nd edition of World Championship Wrestling the team would face Arn Anderson & Barry Windham, again battling to a double disqualification. On the February 9th edition of Pro, the Lightning Express teamed with Terry Taylor to defeat Master Blaster Nash (Kevin Nash), Rip Rogers, and Buddy Rose. The same day on World Championship Wrestling, the Lightning Express & Allen Iron Eagle would face Ric Flair, Barry Windham, and Arn Anderson but would be defeated. This began a losing streak for the veteran team; on February 23 on WCW Worldwide, Anderson & Windham defeated The Lightning Express, and on the March 2nd edition of World Championship Wrestling the Fabulous Freebirds would also defeat them. On April 13 on WCW Pro the Royal Family would also beat the Express.

On the March 9, 1991 edition of WCW Worldwide, Tim Horner defeated WCW World Heavyweight Champion Ric Flair via disqualification in a non-title match after being kayfabe injured by the figure four and Sting came out to intervene. Horner then formed another team, this time with the newly arrived Dustin Rhodes. The duo had their first match on March 1, 1991, when they defeated Larry Zbyszko & Dutch Mantell at a house show in Baltimore, MD. On March 21, Horner participated in the "WCW / New Japan Starcade 91 show in Tokyo, Japan, teaming with Brian Pillman & Tom Zenk in the opening match of the supercard against Shiro Koshinaka, Kuniaki Kobayashi, & Takayuki Iizuka. In June 1991 he was programmed in a house show series against another new arrival to WCW, Black Blood (Billy Jack Haynes). Horner was repeatedly defeated around the country by Black Blood. He would also face The Great Muta at a house show in Albany, GA on June 16th.

=== New Japan Pro Wrestling (1991) ===
Tim Horner joined New Japan Pro Wrestling for a tour in October 1991, facing Keiji Muto in an unsuccessful effort on October 13th in Chiba, Japan. During the tour he would team with Bam Bam Bigelow and Brad Rheingans, and with the latter earned a victory against Flying Scorpio 2 Cold Scorpio & Frank Andersson. His final match on the tour came on December 16th, when he team withed Masa Saito against Kengo Kimura & Osamu Kido.

=== Smoky Mountain Wrestling (1991–1994) ===
While on tour with New Japan, Horner flew back to the United States and participated in the first TV taping for Smoky Mountain Wrestling (SMW). Horner defeated Joe Cazana on the first episode (which aired on February 1, 1992), and when interviewed afterwards by Bob Caudle stated that he said that SMW was not "a bodybuilding competition or a rock concert." On the Feb 15th episode (taped November 27, 1991), he defeated Barry Horowitz, and in the following episode, he was presented an award for his community work by Don Cunningham of the juvenile court of Morristown, TN.

Horner became a lead babyface for the fledgling, startup promotion, defeating Rip Rogers and Buddy Landell in succession before losing to Paul Orndorff in the quarterfinals of a tournament to crown the SMW Heavyweight Champion. He feuded with Buddy Landell in the spring of 1992, with the "Nature Boy" vowing the drive him from Smoky Mountain Wrestling. On July 17, 1992, at Summer Blast 92, Landell defeated Horner in a strap match. Horner rebounded to defeat Landell in numerous rematches. In October 1992 he earned multiple shots at SMW Heavyweight Champion Dirty White Boy, but was only able to defeat him via disqualification. In December, he began teaming with Ron Garvin against The Dirty White Boy & Paul Orndorff at various hous eshow events.

As 1993 began, Horner gained victories over The Dirty White Boy and Paul Orndorff in house show matches, and on January 18, on SMW television, defeated The Dark Secret (a masked Brian Armstrong). On February 8, 1993, Horner won his first singles title when he defeated The Nightstalker to capture the SMW Beat the Champ Television Title Horner would successfully defend the title against the Nightstalker at numerous house shows, before losing the championship to Bobby Eaton on March 1. Horner remained a lead babyface as the year progressed, defeating Bobby Eaton, Tom Pritchard, Jimmy Golden, and Dutch Mantell.

On June 17, 1993, Horner challenged Chris Candido for the WWA Lightheavyweight Title and went to a time limit draw. On June 24, 1993, he participated in the King of Kentucky tournament in Williamsburg, KY, but was defeated by The Dirty White Boy. On July 19 he faced SMW Heavyweight Champion Brian Lee, defeating him via disqualification in a televised match. As the fall began, Horner found himself in a full-fledged feud with Chris Candido, and on August 13, 1993, faced him at Fire on the Mountain 1993 in a "Loser Sucks on a Baby Bottle" match. Candido would win via disqualification, and seven days later at K-Town Showdown he defeated Horner via countout in a "Loser Must Wear a Diaper" match.

On October 10, 1993, Horner regained the SMW Beat the Champ Television Title when he defeated Juicy Johnny on television to win the vacated championship. He would successfully defend the title against Chris Kanyon, Robbie Eagle, and Killer Kyle before losing the title in December. Horner began his 1994 campaign by defeating Dick Murdoch & Jim Cornette in a handicap match on a house show in Albany, KY. Three days later he teamed with Robert Gibson to face SMW Tag-Team Champions The Heavenly Bodies in a sixty-minute iron man match; the Bodies were able to retain their titles.

On April 4, 1994, Horner donned a mask for the first time in Smoky Mountain, competing as the original "Kendo the Samurai" (a masked samurai gimmick, also used by Scott Antol, Brian Logan, Dave Pillman and others) managed by Daryl Van Horne. Wrestling as Kendo, he defeated Brian Logan on SMW television, and on May 2 defeated Chris Hamrick to regain the SMW Beat the Champ Television Title. He held the championship until June 7, when he was defeated by Tracy Smothers on another episode of SMW television. Horner continued to compete under the mask for the remainder of his run; his final match came on July 29, 1994, when he was defeated by The Dirty White Boy in Albany, KY.

=== New Japan Pro Wrestling (1994) ===
Tim Horner returned to New Japan Pro Wrestling for the promotion's "NJPW Battle Final 1994" series. He was defeated by Shinya Hashimoto in his first match on November 23, 1994. Horner would face Tatsumi Fujinami, Osamu Kido, and Manabu Nakanishi in losing efforts, before rebounding to beat Black Cat on December 5. The tour concluded with a countout loss to Satoshi Kojima on December 11.

=== World Championship Wrestling (1995, 1997–1998) ===
Horner returned to World Championship Wrestling, making his first appearance on February 3, 1995, when he teamed with Brad Armstrong to face The Blue Bloods (Bobby Eaton & Lord Steven Regal) in a match taped for the April 9th episode of WCW Worldwide. A day later at a second Worldwide taping, he was defeated in singles action by Bunkhouse Buck. On the February 18th episode of WCW Saturday Night, Horner faced Paul Roma in an unsuccessful effort. In his new WCW stint Horner found himself on the bottom of the card, losing to the Blacktop Bully, Steve Austin, Paul Orndorff, Dallas Page, Alex Wright, The Butcher (Brutus Beefcake), and Big Bubba in televised matches. He also continued to team with Brad Armstrong occasionally, although their former association as The Lightning Express was rarely acknowledged by the announcers. On the April 1, 1995 edition of WCW Saturday Night the Express were defeated by WCW World Tag-Team Champions Harlem Heat.

On April 22, 1995, Horner gained the first win of his WCW comeback when he and Brad Armstrong defeated Len Denton & Rip Rogers on WCW Saturday Night. On May 25, 1995, Horner challenged WCW Television Champion Arn Arnderson but was pinned. On the August 26th edition of WCW Worldwide, Horner faced Ric Flair once more and lost via submission. His final match of the year came on October 26, 1995, at TV taping in Gainesville, GA, where he teamed with Scott Armstrong & Steve Armstrong to face Ric Flair, Arn Anderson, and Brian Pillman.

After a sabbatical that saw Horner competing in Tennessee Mountain Wrestling, Horner returned to WCW on September 15, 1997, to compete in a dark match against John Nord in Charlotte, NC. On March 8, 1998, his final WCW match occurred when he faced Rick Steiner on a house show in Johnson City, TN.

=== Late career (1998–2013) ===
After WCW, he occasionally wrestled on independent shows in Georgia and Tennessee. Horner became the promoter of National Championship Wrestling. He then worked in World Wrestling Entertainment as a producer for its SmackDown! brand, until October 26, 2006. On June 16, 2013, he teamed with Tom Prichard to defeat Bob Orton, Jr. and George South at the Brad Armstrong Memorial Event.

== Political career ==
On May 1, 2018, he was elected County Commissioner in Hamblen County, Tennessee.

== Championships and accomplishments ==
- All-Pro Wrestling
  - APW Tag Team Championship (1 time) - with Keith Hart
- Georgia Championship Wrestling
  - NWA National Tag Team Championship (1 time) - with Brad Armstrong
- Independent International Wrestling Association
  - IIWA Tag Team Championship (1 time) – with Chick Donovan
- Mid-Atlantic Wrestling Alliance
  - MAWA Tag Team Championship (1 time) – with Road Warrior Hawk
- National Championship Wrestling
  - NCW Tag Team Championship (1 time) - with Jeff Tankersley
- Southeastern Championship Wrestling
  - NWA Southeast United States Junior Heavyweight Championship (5 times)
- Smokey Mountain Wrestling
  - SMW Beat the Champ Television Championship (3 times)
- Southern States Wrestling
  - Kingsport Wrestling Hall of Fame (Class of 2002)
- Tennessee Mountain Wrestling
  - TMW Tag Team Championship (1 time) - with Ron Garvin
- United Atlantic Championship Wrestling
  - UACW Heavyweight Championship (1 time)
  - UACW Tag Team Championship (1 time) - with Jimmy Golden
- Universal Wrestling Federation
  - UWF World Tag Team Championship (1 time) - with Brad Armstrong
