= The Master Blasters =

Professional wrestling tag team

Tag team
- Members: Kevin Nash; Al Green; Cory Pendarvis; Chase Tatum
- Billed from: Detroit, Michigan
- Debut: 1990
- Disbanded: February 15, 1991
- Years active: 1990 - 1991, 1999

The Masters Blasters were a professional wrestling tag team consisting of rookie wrestlers Kevin Nash and Cory Pendarvis, with the latter being ultimately replaced by Al Green. The duo began teaming in September 1990 in World Championship Wrestling, and their run became notable for being the launch pad to the WWE Hall of Fame career for Kevin Nash.

== World Championship Wrestling (1990-1991) ==
World Championship Wrestling entering the fall of 1990 was now without the two "monster" tag-teams that had helped to fortify its division. The Legion of Doom had departed for the rival World Wrestling Federation in the summer of 1990, and the Skyscrapers had dissolved following Dan Spivey's departure and the entry of Mark Callous and Sid Vicious into singles careers. New WCW booker Ole Anderson sought to bolster the tag-team division, and on the August 24th, 1990 episode of WCW's Power Hour, an announcement was made about the forthcoming Clash of the Champions XII that stated three new teams would be making their debuts on the program - Maximum Overdrive, The Nasty Boys, and The Master Blasters.

On the September 1st edition of World Championship Wrestling the first vignette was shown of the new duo, showing only their feet and legs as they walked through a junkyard. A second vignette was aired the following week, where the duo was seen tipping over a car. On September 5, 1990 the Nash and Perdarvis made their debut at Clash of the Champions XII. Called Steel and Iron, the new team squashed The Lightning Express. Dressed in attire similar to that of the Legion of Doom, the Blasters had their named derived from one of the villains in Mad Max Beyond ThunderDome.

At the following Worldwide taping on September 7, the Masters Blasters began a feud with Tim Horner and Mike Rotundo. They would defeat Horner and Rotundo on several house shows. On September 22, Pendarvis was replaced by "Blade."

The reconstituted Master Blasters continued their undefeated streak in October. At Halloween Havoc on October 27, 1990, the Blasters upended The Southern Boys and began to move up the WCW tag team ratings. However, their winning streak would finally come to an end on November 22, when Tom Zenk and Brian Pillman handed them their first defeat with Pillman pinning Blade. They rebounded to go on another undefeated streak by defeating The Southern Boys as well as Alan Iron Eagle and Tim Horner, and earning a NWA United States Tag Team Championship title shot against then champions The Steiner Brothers, but were defeated in two occasions. They were squashed on television in 52 seconds by the Steiners in a match that aired on Worldwide on February 2, 1991. Following this loss, their momentum began to dissipate as the Blasters would suffer follow-up losses to The Southern Boys and Ricky Morton and Tommy Rich. Cory Pendarvis made a one-off return to team with Nash in a house show loss to the Steiners in Richmond, VA. on February 10.

On February 15, 1991 the Blasters teamed with James Earl Wright to face The Junkyard Dog, Tommy Rich, and Ricky Morton at a house show in Jacksonsville, FL. They were defeated, and this proved to be the last match for the team. Al Green was reportedly fired for complaining about the squashes to the Steiner Brothers, leading to the dissolution of the Blasters.

== Aftermath ==
Cory Pendarvis (Iron) left professional wrestling following his February 1991 return. Al Green (Blade) departed World Championship Wrestling and soon joined All Japan Pro Wrestling, taking "The Master Blaster" gimmick with him and teaming with Steve Williams. He would eventually return to WCW as part of The Wrecking Crew, and again in the late 90s as "The Dog." Kevin Nash (Steel) remained in WCW and was rebranded as simply The Master Blaster in February 1991 and suffered his first singles defeat on February 27, 1991, when he was pinned by The Junkyard Dog. He also lost to Brian Pillman in house show matches, while appearing in tag team matches with Stan Hansen and Arn Anderson. His final match in this guise was against Pillman at a house show on May 12. A week later he was repackaged as Oz, one of the most infamous gimmicks in professional wrestling. He would later be recast as Vinnie Vegas in 1992, but it would be his departure to the World Wrestling Federation in 1993 that led to a Hall of Fame career as first "Big Daddy Cool" Diesel, followed by an eventual return to WCW as Kevin Nash - part of the foundation of the nWo.

== Brief return (1999) ==
On the April 12, 1999 edition of WCW Monday Nitro, the newly formed Master Blasters were led to the ring by manager Jimmy Hart to face El Dandy and La Parka in a tag-team match. Under the masks were returning Al Greene and newly arrived Chase Tatum. Tony Schiavone exclaimed that he remembered this team and that it had been seven or eight years since they had seen them. Former member of The Master Blasters Kevin Nash came to the ring and interfered in the match, ending it in a no contest.
