= Buddy Roberts =

American-Canadian wrestler (1947–2012)

- Roberts in 1981

Personal information
- Born: Dale Hey; June 16, 1947 Vancouver, British Columbia, Canada
- Died: November 26, 2012 (aged 65) Chicago, Illinois, U.S.
- Cause of death: Pneumonia

Professional wrestling career
- Ring name(s): Buddy Roberts; Dale Valentine; Dick Roberts
- Billed height: 5 ft 11 in (1.80 m)
- Billed weight: 225 lb (102 kg)
- Billed from: "Badstreet U.S.A."
- Trained by: Ivan Koloff
- Debut: 1965
- Retired: April 2, 1993

Dale Hey (June 16, 1947 – November 26, 2012) was a Canadian-American professional wrestler, better known by his ring name, Buddy "Jack" Roberts. Primarily a tag team wrestler, Roberts is known for his appearances as one of The Hollywood Blonds in the 1970s and as one of The Fabulous Freebirds in the 1980s. He was inducted into the Professional Wrestling Hall of Fame in 2015 and the WWE Hall of Fame in 2016 as part of The Fabulous Freebirds.

== Early life ==
Hey was raised in Newton, Surrey and went to Princess Margaret High School, in BC Canada graduating in 1965. After school, he worked in local lumber mills as well as being a bouncer at nightclubs including the Grooveyard in New Westminster. He became an American citizen in 1974.

== Professional wrestling career ==
=== Early career (1965–1970) ===
Hey was trained as a professional wrestler by Ivan Koloff. He debuted in 1965 under the ring name "Dale Valentine", billed as being the younger brother of Johnny Valentine. At the tail end of the 1960s, he was working as a preliminary wrestler in the American Wrestling Association (AWA).

=== The Hollywood Blonds (1970–1978) ===
In 1970, Hey was brought into the Oklahoma-based NWA Tri-State promotion by booker Bill Watts. Watts had intended to create a new tag team comprising Jack Donovan and veteran journeyman Jerry Brown. After Donovan left the promotion following a dispute with Watts, Watts hired Hey in his place. Hey was renamed "Buddy Roberts" and began teaming with Brown as The Hollywood Blonds. In 1972, Oliver Humperdink began managing The Hollywood Blonds. The team of Brown and Roberts won numerous regional tag team titles across the United States throughout the 1970s. They would disband in 1978.

=== The Fabulous Freebirds (1979–1988) ===
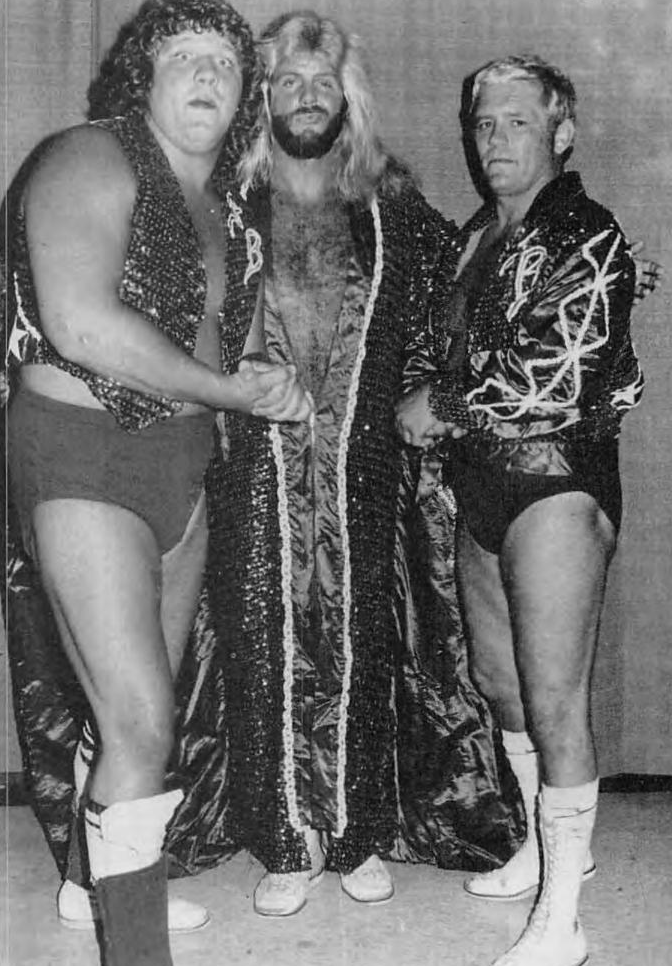
Roberts (right) with Fabulous Freebirds stablemates Terry Gordy and Michael Hayes in 1985

After splitting from Brown, Roberts joined with Michael Hayes and Terry Gordy to form The Fabulous Freebirds. Again, Bill Watts played a major role in this decision. Hayes and Gordy had been teaming together in various promotions in the Mid-South and Southeastern regions of the United States for several years, but Watts was not as impressed with Hayes's in-ring work as he was with his skills on the microphone. His original plan was to have Gordy and Roberts as the actual tag team, with Hayes as their manager. Except for a high-profile stint in 1980 in Mid-South Wrestling (formed by Watts the previous year after breaking away from NWA Tri-State) with Hayes and Gordy as the Freebirds, Roberts did not work full-time with the team until they joined Georgia Championship Wrestling in late 1980. He later became known as Buddy "Jack" Roberts, due to his penchant for drinking Jack Daniel's whiskey.

=== World Class Championship Wrestling/World Wrestling Federation/American Wrestling Association (1982–1985) ===
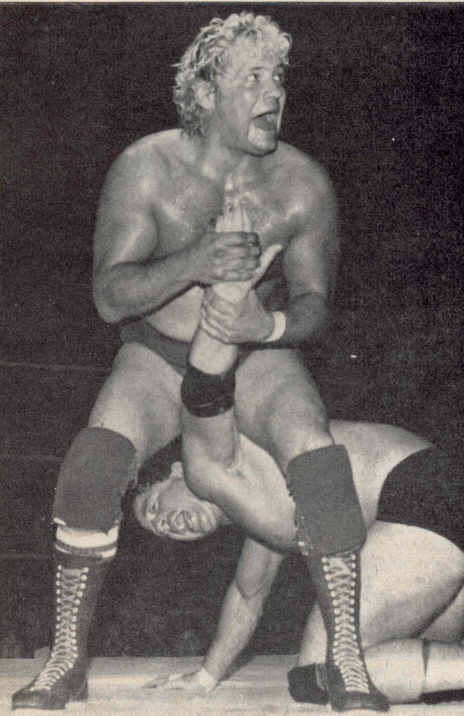
Roberts applying an armbar on B. Brian Blair in 1985

The Fabulous Freebirds won several titles and moved on to World Class Championship Wrestling in late 1982 and began a high-profile feud with the Von Erich family. They wrestled David Von Erich, Kerry Von Erich, Mike Von Erich and Kevin Von Erich numerous times in 1986. Roberts also had a long-standing feud with Von Erich ally Chris Adams, which lasted on and off for more than five years. Roberts' most famous singles angle came in WCCW in 1983, and involved the invention of what the Freebirds referred to as "Freebird Hair Removal Cream". The angle culminated in a hair match between Roberts and Iceman Parsons on June 17. Roberts seemingly won the match via tight-pulling, but the decision was reversed and the match restarted. In the fracas, Roberts' head was lathered in the hair removal cream. At subsequent events, Roberts wore a wig, kept in place by boxing headgear. In 1984, Roberts and the Freebirds had a short stint in the World Wrestling Federation, mainly competing in six-man tag matches. Here, they were managed by Cyndi Lauper's manager, David Wolff. They left the promotion when WWF officials stated their intention to split the team up. At the AWA's SuperClash in 1985, Roberts helped Hayes and Gordy defeat The Road Warriors for the AWA World Tag Team Championship, but the decision was later reversed.

=== Universal Wrestling Federation (1986) ===
In early 1986, The Freebirds went to the Universal Wrestling Federation, where Roberts won the UWF Television Championship on September 28. He lost it to Savannah Jack on November 9.

=== Return to World Class Championship Wrestling (1987–1989) ===
In 1987, The Freebirds split up and reformed. Roberts and Gordy turned on Hayes and teamed with Iceman Parsons to feud with Hayes and the Von Erichs. Gordy eventually left Roberts to rejoin Hayes, turning on Roberts and cutting his hair instead of Hayes' after winning a loser-lose-hair cage match over Hayes at the 5th Von Erich Memorial Parade of Champions. Roberts, declaring his former partners to be traitors for befriending the Von Erichs and himself the last true Freebird, acted as a manager to the Samoan Swat Team. The feud ended in late 1988 when Hayes and Gordy left for the NWA's Jim Crockett Promotions, before Roberts retired from wrestling. Roberts also had a short feud with World Class referee David Manning, which included several gimmick matches, such as Roberts wrestling with one arm tied behind his back. Manning, who was touted as an accomplished amateur wrestler by the promotion to compensate for the obvious size difference between the two, won most of the matches on a fluke.

=== Later career (1990–1993) ===
Roberts managed Hayes and Jimmy Garvin in one match against Steve Armstrong and Tracy Smothers in World Championship Wrestling (WCW) on September 5, 1990. He came out of retirement on April 2, 1993, for the Global Wrestling Federation's Kerry Von Erich Memorial Show, and teamed with Michael Hayes (with Skandor Akbar in their corner), losing to Kevin Von Erich and Chris Adams (with Fritz Von Erich in their corner). Roberts later developed throat cancer, and had surgery to treat it. He was quoted as saying "Don't smoke. I think the reason this happened to me is because I was smoking too much. I recommend to anyone who smokes to quit now. It is hard, but it is worth it."

== Death ==
Roberts died on November 26, 2012, at the age of 65, of pneumonia. On April 2, 2016, Roberts was posthumously inducted into the WWE Hall Of Fame by his son, Buddy "Jack" Roberts Jr. as part of The Fabulous Freebirds.

== Championships and accomplishments ==
- Cauliflower Alley Club
  - Other honoree (2003)
- Continental Wrestling Association
  - AWA Southern Tag Team Championship (1 time) - with Jerry Brown
- Championship Wrestling from Florida
  - NWA Florida Tag Team Championship (2 times) - with Jerry Brown
- Georgia Championship Wrestling
  - NWA National Tag Team Championship - with Michael Hayes and Terry Gordy)
- Mid-Atlantic Championship Wrestling
  - NWA Mid-Atlantic Tag Team Championship (1 time) - with Jerry Brown
- New Japan Pro-Wrestling
  - NWA North American Tag Team Championship (Los Angeles/Japan version) (1 time) - with Jerry Brown
- NWA Big Time Wrestling / World Class Championship Wrestling / World Class Wrestling Association
  - NWA Texas Heavyweight Championship (1 time)
  - NWA World Six-Man Tag Team Championship (Texas version) (6 times) - with Michael Hayes & Terry Gordy (5) and Iceman Parsons & Terry Gordy (1)
  - WCCW Television Championship (1 time)
  - WCWA World Six-Man Tag Team Championship (1 time) - with Michael Hayes & Terry Gordy ^{1}
- NWA Hollywood Wrestling
  - NWA Americas Tag Team Championship (4 times) - with Jerry Brown
- Pro Wrestling Illustrated
  - PWI ranked him #167 of the top 500 singles wrestlers of the "PWI Years" in 2003
- NWA Tri-State / Mid-South Wrestling Association / Universal Wrestling Federation
  - NWA United States Tag Team Championship (Tri-State version) (3 times) - with Jerry Brown
  - Mid-South Tag Team Championship (1 time) - with Terry Gordy
  - UWF World Television Championship (1 time)
- Professional Wrestling Hall of Fame
  - Class of 2015 as a member of The Fabulous Freebirds
- Southern Pro Wrestling
  - SPW Arkansas Heavyweight Championship (1 time)
- Southwest Championship Wrestling
  - SCW Southwest Television Championship (2 times)
  - SCW Southwest Heavyweight Championship (1 time)
- WWE
  - WWE Hall of Fame (Class of 2016)
- Wrestling Observer Newsletter
  - Match of the Year (1984) with Terry Gordy and Michael Hayes vs. the Von Erichs (Kerry, Kevin, and Mike) in an Anything Goes match on July 4
  - Best Three-Man Team (1983) with Terry Gordy & Michael Hayes
  - Tag Team of the Year (1980) with Terry Gordy as The Fabulous Freebirds
  - Wrestling Observer Newsletter Hall of Fame (Class of 2005) – as part of The Fabulous Freebirds

^{1}During the Freebirds' 5th reign, the reign carried over after the title's name was changed to the WCWA World Six-Man Tag Team Championship since they were the champions during the time the name change occurred.

== See also ==
- The Fabulous Freebirds
- The Hollywood Blonds
