= Afa Anoaʻi =

Samoan-American professional wrestler (1943–2024)

Afa Anoa'i
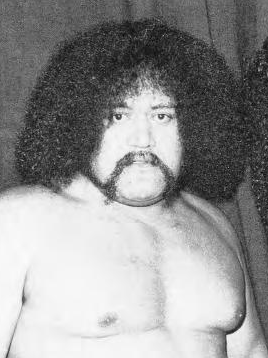
- Afa in 1986

Personal information
- Born: Afa Amituanaʻi Anoaʻi; November 21, 1943 Leone, Tutuila, American Samoa
- Died: August 16, 2024 (aged 80) Pensacola, Florida, U.S.
- Spouse: Lynn Maluta (m. 1960)
- Children: 7 including Afa Jr, Lloyd, and Samuel
- Family: Anoaʻi

Professional wrestling career
- Ring name(s): Afa; Wild Samoan #1
- Billed height: 6 ft 2 in (188 cm)
- Billed weight: 326 lb (148 kg)
- Billed from: "The Isle of Samoa"
- Trained by: Kurt von Steiger; Peter Maivia; Rocky Johnson
- Debut: 1971
- Retired: 1995

Afa Amituanaʻi Anoaʻi (November 21, 1943 – August 16, 2024) was a Samoan-American professional wrestler and professional wrestling manager. He is best known for performing with his brother Sika as The Wild Samoans. He operated the World Xtreme Wrestling promotion after he retired from pro wrestling in 1995, and trained wrestlers at the Wild Samoan Training Center in Minneola, Florida. With his brother, he won the WWF World Tag Team Championship.

== Early life ==
Anoaʻi was born in Leone, American Samoa, on November 21, 1943, to Reverend Amituana'i Anoa'i and Tovaleomanaia Ripley-Anoa'i. When he was young, his family relocated to San Francisco, California, in the United States, where his father established the First Congregational Christian Church of American Samoa. At the age of 17, Anoaʻi enlisted in the U.S. Marine Corps.

== Professional wrestling career ==
=== Early career (1971–1979) ===
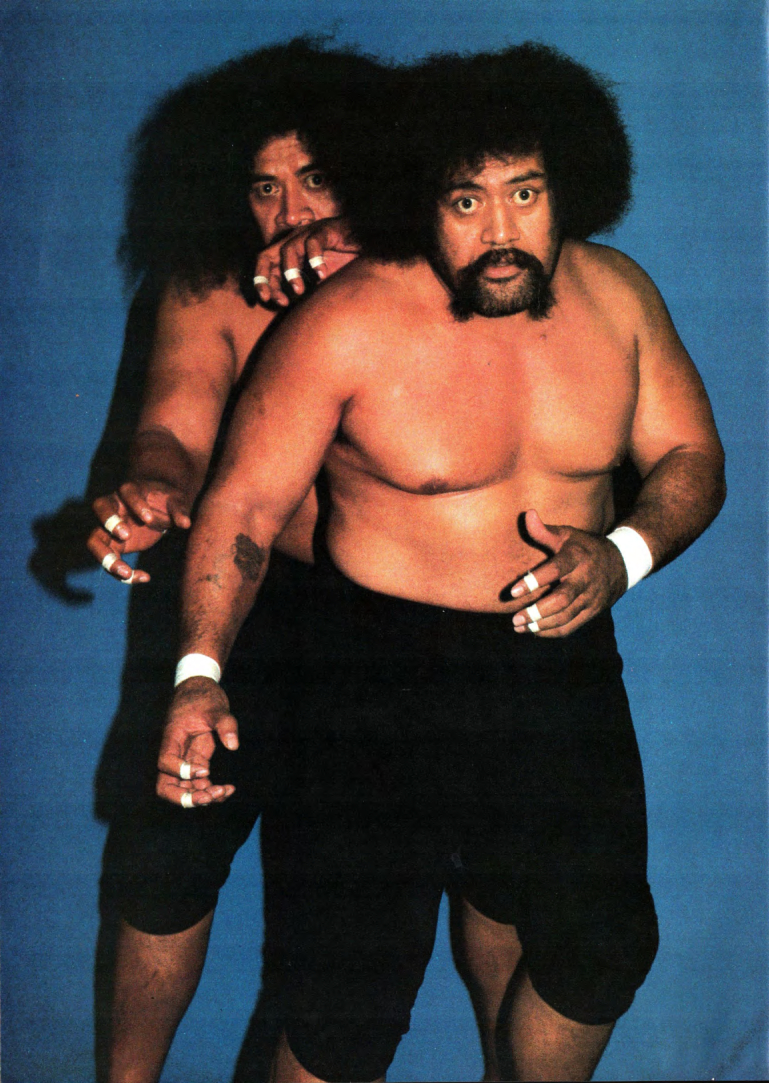
Afa (front) with his brother Sika in 1983

Upon leaving the Marine Corps, Anoaʻi began training as a wrestler under his uncle Peter Maivia and cousin-in-law Rocky Johnson. He later received supplementary training from Kurt Von Steiger. He wrestled his first match in 1971 in Phoenix, Arizona. He then trained his brother Sika, and the siblings formed a tag team known best as The Wild Samoans.

Throughout the 1970s, The Wild Samoans wrestled for the Canadian Stampede Wrestling promotion (where they received further training from Stu Hart) and for numerous National Wrestling Alliance affiliates. In 1978, The Wild Samoans traveled to Japan to wrestle for International Wrestling Enterprise, winning the IWA World Tag Team Championship.

=== World Wrestling Federation (1979–1995) ===
In 1979, The Wild Samoans joined the World Wrestling Federation, where they were managed by Lou Albano and referred to as "Albano's Wildmen". The "wild" nature of the brothers was conveyed through their unorthodox behavior (which included communicating only in unintelligible grunts and consuming unprepared raw fish, during interviews and while approaching the wrestling ring). While in the WWF, The Wild Samoans won the WWF World Tag Team Championship. Both members also challenged Bob Backlund for the WWF Heavyweight Championship on several occasions. They left the promotion in 1980.

The Wild Samoans then wrestled in Mid-South Wrestling and Jim Crockett Promotions, before returning to the WWF in 1982 and regaining the WWF World Tag Team Championship in 1983. After Sika suffered an injury, the tag team was supplemented by Afa's son Samu (the relationship was not acknowledged on TV). The trio remained in the WWF until 1984. According to Afa, he lost his job because he missed work to attend the birth of his son.

Anoaʻi returned to the WWF for a third time in 1992, as the manager and occasional tag partner of The Headshrinkers (Samu and Anoai's nephew, Fatu). He wrestled his final match on May 22, 1994, teaming with The Headshrinkers to defeat The Quebecers and Johnny Polo at the Rosemont Horizon. Anoaʻi left the WWF in mid-1995.

=== Training and semi-retirement (1995–2024) ===
After leaving the WWF, he began training wrestlers at his Wild Samoan Training Facility, along with Sika. In 1997, both men reunited for one night teaming at IWA Night Of The Legends.

On March 31, 2007, the Wild Samoans were inducted into the WWE Hall of Fame by Samu and Sika's son, Matt. He was the wrestling trainer for Darren Aronofsky's 2008 film, The Wrestler.

In 2013 and 2014, Afa came out of retirement to wrestle for his promotion World Xtreme Wrestling at age 71.

The Wild Samoans appeared at Hell in a Cell in 2020 to celebrate Roman Reigns's victory.

== Usos Foundation ==
In 1999, Afa and his wife Lynn started the Usos Foundation, a non-profit organization aiming to turn youth away from drugs, gangs, and poverty by providing scholarships to the Wild Samoans Training Center.

== Personal life ==
Anoa'i was married to Lynn Maluta. His sons Afa Jr, Lloyd, and Samuel were professional wrestlers. Anoa'i held the matai title of Gataivasā.

== Death ==
On August 16, 2024, Samu Anoa'i announced Afa had died of a heart attack at the age of 80, less than two months after Sika's death. Sika was Afa's real life brother and tag team partner.

== Championships and accomplishments ==
- Big Time Wrestling
  - NWA World Tag Team Championship (Detroit version) (2 times) – with Sika
- Continental Wrestling Association
  - AWA Southern Tag Team Championship (1 time) – with Sika
- Georgia Championship Wrestling
  - NWA National Tag Team Championship (1 time) – with Sika
- Gulf Coast Championship Wrestling
  - NWA Gulf Coast Tag Team Championship (2 times) – with Sika
- International Wrestling Enterprise
  - IWA World Tag Team Championship (1 time) – with Sika
- Mid-South Wrestling Association
  - Mid-South Tag Team Championship (3 times) – with Sika
- NWA All-Star Wrestling
  - NWA Canadian Tag Team Championship (Vancouver version) (1 time) – with Sika
- NWA Mid-America
  - NWA United States Tag Team Championship (Mid-America version) (1 time) – with Sika
- Professional Wrestling Hall of Fame
  - Class of 2012 – Inducted as a member of the Wild Samoans
- Pro Wrestling Illustrated
  - PWI ranked him # 346 of the 500 best singles wrestlers of the "PWI Years" in 2003
  - PWI ranked him # 93 of the 100 best tag teams of the "PWI Years" with Sika in 2003
- Southeastern Championship Wrestling
  - NWA Southern Tag Team Championship (Southern Division) (2 times) – with Sika
- Stampede Wrestling
  - Stampede Wrestling International Tag Team Championship (2 times) – with Sika
- World Wrestling Entertainment / World Wrestling Federation
  - WWF Tag Team Championship (3 times) – with Sika
  - WWE Hall of Fame (Class of 2007)
- The Official Wrestling Museum
  - The Official Wrestling Museum Hall Of Fame (2025)

== Acting career ==
- Body Slam (1987)
- Miami Vice (1987) in the episode "By Hooker by Crook" as "Henchman #2"
- Mr. Nanny (1993)

== See also ==
- Anoaʻi family
