= Sika Anoaʻi =

American Samoan professional wrestler (1945–2024)

Sika Anoa'i
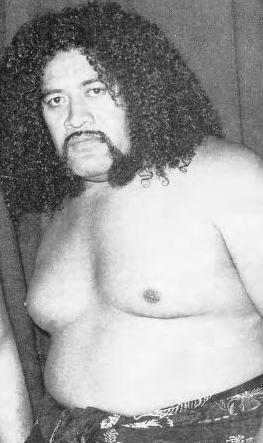
- Sika in 1986

Personal information
- Born: Leati Sika Amituana'i Anoa'i; April 5, 1945 Leone, Tutuila, American Samoa
- Died: June 25, 2024 (aged 79) Pensacola, Florida, U.S.
- Spouse: Patricia Hooker
- Children: 5, including Roman Reigns and Rosey
- Family: Anoaʻi

Professional wrestling career
- Ring names: The Samoan #2; Sika; Sika Samoa; Wild Samoan #2
- Billed height: 6 ft 2 in (188 cm)
- Billed weight: 319 lb (145 kg)
- Billed from: "The Isle of Samoa"
- Trained by: Afa Anoa'i; Kurt Von Steiger
- Debut: 1973
- Retired: 1991

Leati Sika Amituana'i Anoa'i (April 5, 1945 – June 25, 2024), better known by the ring name Sika, was a Samoan-American professional wrestler. He is best known as one-half of the tag team the Wild Samoans with his older brother Afa, holding the WWF World Tag Team Championship three times. Sika and Afa were inducted into the WWE Hall of Fame in 2007 and the Professional Wrestling Hall of Fame in 2012.

== Early life ==
Sika Anoa'i was born in the village of Leone on the island of Tutuila in American Samoa on April 5, 1945, to Reverend Amituana'i Anoa'i and Tovaleomanaia Ripley, one of thirteen children. In 1959, at the age of 14, he moved with his family to San Francisco, California in the United States, where his father became pastor of the First Congregational Christian Church of American Samoa. Shortly after, Anoa'i enlisted in the United States Merchant Marine, working on ships sailing to the Philippines and Japan. He left in 1969 and worked, as a dockworker before leaving to join his brother Afa in pro wrestling.

== Professional wrestling career ==
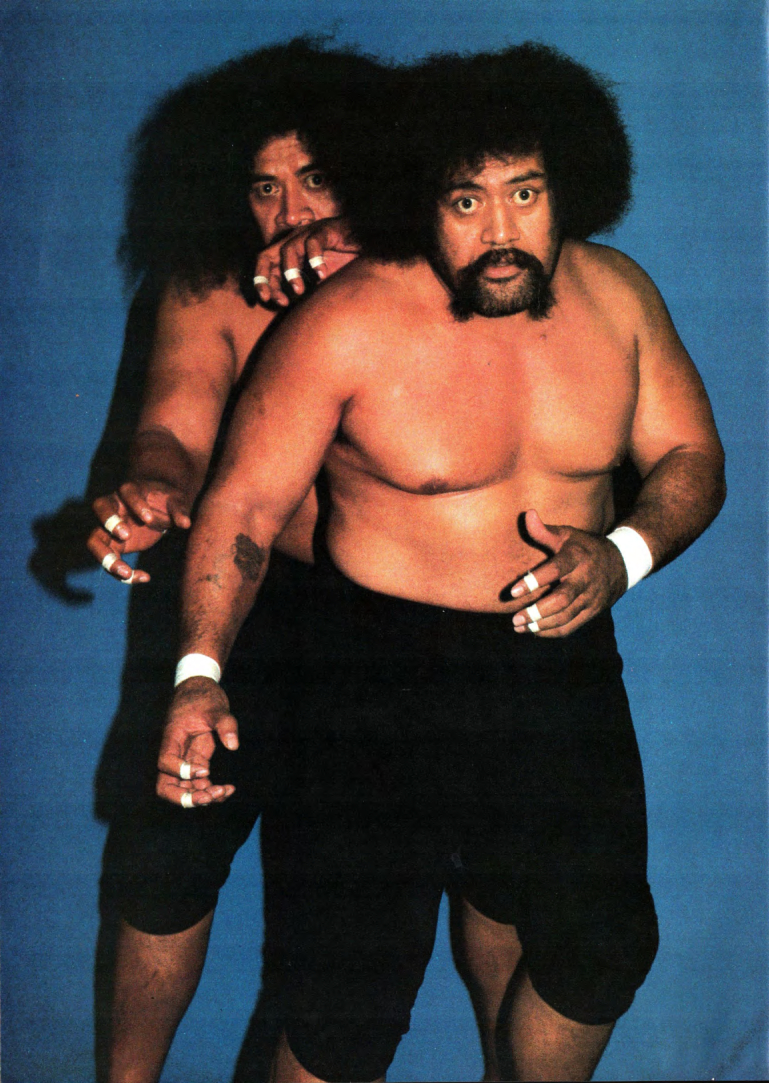
Sika (behind) with his brother Afa in 1983

=== Early career (1973–1980) ===
Anoaʻi was trained to wrestle by his brother Afa and Kurt Von Steiger, debuting in 1973 in Stampede Wrestling as "Sika". Calling themselves "the Wild Samoans", the brothers gained notoriety due to their large, wild afros, sarongs, and habit of wrestling barefoot and eating raw fish in the ring. Throughout the 1970s, the Wild Samoans appeared with promotions including Big Time Wrestling, the Continental Wrestling Association, Gulf Coast Championship Wrestling, NWA All-Star Wrestling, NWA Mid-America, Stampede Wrestling, and the World Wrestling Council, winning multiple tag team championships. From 1977 to 1979, the Samoans made repeated tours of Japan with International Wrestling Enterprise; in January 1978, they briefly held the IWA World Tag Team Championship.

=== World Wrestling Federation (1980) ===
In January 1980, the Wild Samoans debuted in the World Wrestling Federation with Lou Albano as their manager, quickly establishing themselves as a force in the tag team division through a series of decisive victories. In addition to competing in the tag division, the brothers wrestled as singles, Sika unsuccessfully challenging Bob Backlund for the WWF Championship in March 1980.

On April 12, 1980, the Wild Samoans defeated Ivan Putski and Tito Santana to win the WWF World Tag Team Championship. Their reign lasted until August 9, 1980, when they lost to Backlund and Pedro Morales at Showdown at Shea. As Backlund was the then-WWF Champion, he and Morales were forced to vacate the championship, and the Wild Samoans regained the championship on the September 9, 1980, episode of WWF Championship Wrestling, defeating Tony Garea and Rene Goulet in the finals of a tournament. Their second reign lasted until November 8, 1980, when they lost to Garea and Rick Martel. They left the WWF in December 1980.

=== New Japan Pro-Wrestling (1981) ===
On November 22, 1981, the Wild Samoans were disqualified in a match against Animal Hamaguchi and Rusher Kimura.

=== Mid-South Wrestling (1981–1982) ===
In April 1981, the Wild Samoans debuted in the Oklahoma City, Oklahoma-based promotion Mid-South Wrestling. They were initially managed by Ernie Ladd before betraying him to align themselves with Skandor Akbar. They held the Mid-South Tag Team Championship on three occasions between June 1981 and May 1982, feuding with Junkyard Dog and his partners. They left the promotion in May 1982.

=== Georgia Championship Wrestling (1982) ===
In March 1982, the Wild Samoans began competing for the Atlanta, Georgia-based promotion Georgia Championship Wrestling, where they were managed by Sonny King. In August 1982, they defeated The Fabulous Freebirds to win the NWA National Tag Team Championship. They held the championship for several months, vacating it in December 1982 upon leaving the promotion to return to the WWF.

=== Return to WWF (1983–1985) ===
The Wild Samoans returned to the WWF in November 1982, once again adopting Lou Albano as their manager. They won the WWF World Tag Team Championship for a third and final time on March 8, 1983, defeating Chief Jay Strongbow and Jules Strongbow. During their reign, Sika was injured and his nephew Samu substituted for him in several title defences. On November 15, 1983, they lost the belts to Soul Patrol (Rocky Johnson and Tony Atlas) after Albano accidentally hit Afa with a chair.

After splitting from Albano, the Wild Samoans challenged Soul Patrol on several occasions, but were unable to regain the championship. In April 1984, Sika unsuccessfully challenged Hogan for the WWF Championship in one of Hogan's earliest title defenses. In mid-1984, the Wild Samoans turned face and began a lengthy feud with the North-South Connection (Adrian Adonis and Dick Murdoch) who were the WWF World Tag Team Champions. They left the WWF once more in January 1985.

=== Various promotions (1985–1986) ===
The Wild Samoans appeared with several promotions in 1985 and 1986, including Pro Wrestling USA, Lutte Internationale and International Championship Wrestling.

=== Second return to WWF (1986–1988) ===
With Afa now semi-retired, Sika returned to the WWF in August 1986 as a singles wrestler. Managed by The Wizard, he went undefeated before dropping a countout to Ricky Steamboat, a pinfall to Pedro Morales and a disqualification to Hillbilly Jim in November 1986.

In March 1987, Sika formed a tag team with Kamala, aligning himself with Kamala's manager, Mr. Fuji, and "handler", Kim Chee. The duo wrestled a series of matches against The Can-Am Connection and took part in several tournaments. The team was dissolved in August 1987 when Kamala left the WWF. In September 1987, he competed in the King of the Ring tournament, losing in the first round to S. D. Jones. On the October 3, 1987 Saturday Night's Main Event XII (recorded September 23, 1987), he unsuccessfully challenged WWF Champion Hulk Hogan in the main event. He wrestled a series of matches against Bam Bam Bigelow and then against Jake Roberts. At the Slammy Awards ceremony on December 16, 1987, the "Song of the Year" category ended with no winner after he ate the envelope containing the winner's name.

In early 1988, Sika's regular opponents included Lanny Poffo, George Steele, and Hillbilly Jim. On March 27, 1988, he appeared on his first pay-per-view, competing in a battle royal at WrestleMania IV. He left the WWF once more following the bout.

=== Independent Circuit (1988–1989) ===
After leaving the WWF, Sika wrestled several matches on the independent circuit. He formed a short-lived tag team with his nephew Kokina in the Continental Wrestling Federation, where they were managed by Alan Martin. He retired in 1989.

=== Sporadic appearances (1991–2020) ===
He wrestled a couple of matches in 1991 in Austria and Connecticut.

On August 15, 1997, the Wild Samoans reunited for one night teaming with Disco Inferno, Gene Ligon and the Big Cheese as they defeated Ken Timbs, George Love, Jay Love, Gary Royal and Kane Adams at IWA Night of the Legends in Kannapolis, North Carolina.

His last match was in 2006.

On March 31, 2007, the Wild Samoans were inducted into the WWE Hall of Fame by Sika's son Rosey and Afa's son Samu.

The Wild Samoans appeared at Hell in a Cell on October 25, 2020, to celebrate Roman Reigns' victory.

== Personal life ==
Anoaʻi was married to and separated from Patricia Hooker. They had five children. Their oldest son, Matt (1970–2017), worked in WWE as Rosey and was a tag team champion. Younger son Joseph played college football for Georgia Tech from 2003 to 2006 before beginning a professional wrestling career in 2010, winning the WWE Championship on multiple occasions as Roman Reigns. Anoa'i held the matai title of Pola’ivao.

== Death ==
Sika Anoa'i died in Pensacola, Florida on June 25, 2024, at the age of 79. His death was caused by a heart attack. Just under two months after his death, his real life brother and tag team partner Afa would also pass away.

== Championships and accomplishments ==
- Big Time Wrestling
  - NWA World Tag Team Championship (Detroit version) (2 times) – with Afa
- Continental Wrestling Association
  - AWA Southern Tag Team Championship (1 time) – with Afa
- Georgia Championship Wrestling
  - NWA National Tag Team Championship (1 time) – with Afa
- Gulf Coast Championship Wrestling
  - NWA Gulf Coast Tag Team Championship (2 times) – with Afa
- International Wrestling Enterprise
  - IWA Tag Team Championship (1 time) – with Afa
- Mid-South Wrestling
  - Mid-South Tag Team Championship (3 times) – with Afa
- NWA All-Star Wrestling
  - NWA Canadian Tag Team Championship (Vancouver version) (1 time) – with Afa
- NWA Mid-America
  - NWA United States Tag Team Championship (Mid-America version) (1 time) – with Afa
- Pro Wrestling Illustrated
  - PWI ranked him # 462 of the 500 best singles wrestlers of the "PWI Years" in 2003
  - PWI ranked him # 93 of the 100 best tag teams of the "PWI Years" with Afa in 2003
- Professional Wrestling Hall of Fame
  - Class of 2012 – with Afa
- Stampede Wrestling
  - Stampede International Tag Team Championship (2 times) – with Afa
- World Wrestling Council
  - WWC North American Tag Team Championship (1 time) – with Afa
- World Wrestling Entertainment/World Wrestling Federation
  - WWE Hall of Fame (Class of 2007)
  - WWF World Tag Team Championship (3 times) – with Afa

== See also ==
- Anoaʻi family
- Wild Samoans
