= Southern Wrestling Hall of Fame =

Professional wrestling hall of fame

The Southern Wrestling Hall of Fame (originally the Texas Wrestling Hall of Fame) is a professional wrestling hall of fame maintained by Iconic Heroes of Wrestling Excellence (IHWE). Established in 2009 to honor select wrestling personalities, inductees were initially limited to alumni of the Global Wrestling Federation, National Wrestling Alliance, USWA Texas, and World Class Championship Wrestling, but also included independent stars after 2011. In 2015, the hall of fame expanded to include wrestling personalities from all of the Southern United States.

It is the first and only hall of fame created to honor pro wrestling personalities in Texas wrestling. David Fuller, founder of the Texas Wrestling Hall of Fame, was partly inspired by the National Wrestling Hall of Fame and Museum in Waterloo, Iowa. He has also stated his admiration for the Professional Wrestling Hall of Fame and Museum in Amsterdam, New York and hoped that the Texas Wrestling Hall of Fame would have a physical building if they were able to get funding in the future. The Hall of Fame has been endorsed by Cauliflower Alley Club and a number of other wrestling personalities. Fuller was subsequently honored by the organization. Fuller has said that one of his goals in starting the Texas Wrestling Hall of Fame was to bring attention to Texas-area independent stars and promotions.

== Induction ceremonies ==
The induction ceremony for the Class of 2009, the inaugural inductees into the Hall of Fame, took place in Dallas, Texas on January 1, 2009. Slick, the first African-American manager in the World Wrestling Federation, led the class, which also included wrestler Chico Torres. On April 17, 2010, the Class of 2010 was inducted into the Hall of Fame. Wrestler Johnny Valentine's induction led the Class of 2010, followed by longtime ring announcer Rob Moore. Valentine's award was accepted by his widow, Sharon Valentine, and was the last public appearance before her death.

The Class of 2011 was led by Skandor Akbar. He was originally to be presented the award at an IHWE event on December 4, 2010 but died prior to the event. Akbar's nephew, Jerry Cluey, accepted the award on behalf of his late uncle. Other inductees included Kit Carson, Rodney Mack, Matt Borne, Larry Green, and Johnny T. The "Battle Box", a hardcore wrestling match invented by XCW, was also recognized at the show. During the following Hall of Fame ceremony on April 21, 2012, at the Dixie House Cafe in Fort Worth, Texas, Kamala led the Class of 2012. Jazz, Krusher Kong, Prince Al Farat, and Spoiler 2000 were also inducted that year. Both the famed Dallas Sportatorium and the Texas Wrestling Academy were honored at the event.

The 5th-annual Texas Wrestling Hall of Fame ceremony was held in Fort Worth on March 16, 2013. Bruiser Brody led the Class of 2013. Brody was formerly inducted by Rob Moore who presented the award to longtime friend Stan "The Lariat" Hansen on behalf of Brody's widow Barbara Goodish. Also inducted that year were Black Bart, Canyon Lindley, referee James Beard, and posthumous inductees Killer Karl Kox and Rick Davidson. Bob Murphy's Texas All-Star Wrestling, the oldest promotion in the state, were honored for their contributions to Texas independent wrestling. The organization also conducted an interview with Kevin Von Erich who discussed his thoughts on the 2013 Class. The 2014 HOF ceremony was held on March 15, 2014. The Class of 2014 was led by Stan Hansen followed by Terry "Bam Bam" Gordy, Gary Young, posthumous inductees Ray Evans and Awesome Kong, Khris Germany, Todd Diamond, referee Rick Manning, and Gary Tool. Skandor Akbar's Devastation Incorporated was also inducted into the hall of fame. The 2014 Hall of Fame ceremony was filmed for the first time and released to the public on YouTube.com.

The Texas Wrestling Hall of Fame ceremony has traditionally been closed to the general public. The decision to exclude wrestling fans was originally to respect the privacy of inductees and their families during the small private banquet. The organizer, David Fuller, was also concerned the event could be seen as opportunism on his part. Given that other wrestling hall of fame and memorial shows on the independent circuit have commonly been used to "cash in" on popular wrestling stars, the HOF ceremonies are strictly non-profit events. In the case of posthumous inductees, no wrestler is inducted without the blessing of the families and that a friend or family member is there to accept the award.

The Hall of Fame ceremonies have typically featured special guests, often former inductees, who have given speeches during the event. Matt Borne, a 2011 inductee, was scheduled to attend the 2014 edition but died before the event. The organizers decided to honor the late wrestler with a special memorial induction into the Texas HOF. Borne's wife and two children flew down from Pittsburgh to attend. Kansas City artist Rob Schamberger donated portraits to inductees and their families.

In September 2014 IHWE during its biggest show of the year Old School Hustle at the Cendera Center in Fort Worth, Tx. The Grappler Len Denton & Jim Cornette were both honored into the Hall of Fame by James Beard. Several Hall of Fame inductees were present for the honor, Barbara Goodish, Stan Hansen, Kit Carson, Khris Germany, Todd Hecht, Rick Manning, Black Bart. Morgan Dollar the Executive Vice President of the Cauliflower Alley Club was also on hand & announced after the induction of Cornette that at the 50th CAC the following year the CAC Would honor Bruiser Brody with a posthumous honor as Barbara Goodish then spoke to the sold-out crowd.

== Future plans ==
As the awards have generated interest from Texas wrestling fans in recent years, Fuller has stated he will work on turning it into a larger event. The main obstacle to this, however, was that the event had now outgrown its older venues and would need to move to a much larger venue in order to accommodate fans. The restaurant hosting the 2014 HOF dinner, for example, was standing room only with both floors filled to capacity. A day after the 2014 HOF, Fuller speculated on whether to open the event to the public or to hold a wrestling convention either before or after the event.

Each HOF ceremony is limited to ten or so inductions per year. As of 2014, there have been a total of 32 inductees: 29 members inducted individually, one wrestling "gimmick" match, one stable and one wrestling family. Matt Borne is the only Hall of Famer to be inducted twice, first individually in 2011, then as posthumously in 2014. Eight members were inducted posthumously.

An official panel to oversee the selection process will be formed in 2015 and will include former WCCW referee James Beard and XCW promoter Nite Davis. Shortly before the 2014 HOF, founder David Fuller announced that the Von Erich family would be the first inductees of the Class of 2015.

== Inductees ==
#	Year	Ring name (Real name)^{[a]}	Inducted by	Inducted for	Notes^{[b]}
1	2009	Slick (Ken Johnson)	David Fuller	Managing	
2	2009	Chico Torres	David Fuller	Wrestling	
3	2010	Johnny Valentine (John Wisniski)	David Fuller, Raven Willow Fuller and David Farmer Sr.	Wrestling	Won the NWA American Heavyweight Championship (1 time), NWA Brass Knuckles Championship (Texas version) (2 times), NWA United States Heavyweight Championship (Texas version) (1 time), NWA North American Heavyweight Championship (Amarillo version) (1 time), NWA Texas Heavyweight Championship (8 times), NWA Texas Tag Team Championship (1 time), NWA American Tag Team Championship (3 times)
4	2010	Rob Moore		Announcing and Commentating	Longtime ring announcer for UWF/Mid-South, USWA Texas, and World Class Championship Wrestling; also play-by-play commentator for NWA Southwest Wrestling.
5	2011	Skandor Akbar (Jimmy Wehba)	Spoiler 2000	Wrestling, Managing, and Promoting	Global Wrestling Federation and World Class Championship Wrestling; founder of Devastation Incorporated.
6	2011	Matt Borne (Matt Osborne)	Chico Torres	Wrestling	Won the TWF Heavyweight Championship (1 time), USWA World Tag Team Championship (2 times), WCWA Texas Heavyweight Championship (1 time), WCWA World Tag Team Championship (2 times)
7	2011	Rodney Mack (Rodney Begnaud)	Mike Foxx	Wrestling	Won the NWA Texas Heavyweight Championship (3 times), XCW Heavyweight Championship (1 time)
08	2011	Kit Carson	Khris Germany	Wrestling, Refereeing, and Promoting	Won the NWA Texas Tag Team Championship (2 times), NWA World Tag Team Championship (3 times), XCW Heavyweight Championship (1 time), XCW Ironman Championship (1 time), XCW Tag Team Championship (4 times)
9	2011	Johnny T	David Fuller	Announcing and Commentating	Ring announcer and color commentator for NWA Southwest Wrestling and Texas Championship Wrestling.
9	2011	Larry Green		Wrestling	Won the DFW Tag Team Championship (1 time), LCW Tag Team Title Championship (1 time), NWA Texas Tag Team Championship (3 times), XCW Tag Team Championship (1 time)
10	2012	Prince Al Farat (Al Kuyaribo Santos)		Wrestling and Promoting	Won the NWA Top of Texas Heavyweight Championship (1 time), NWA Texas Tag Team Championship (1 time)
11	2012	Krusher Kong (Scott Thompson)		Wrestling	Won the NWA Texas Hardcore Championship (1 time), PCW Heavyweight Championship (1 time), XCW Heavyweight Championship (2 time), XCW Tag Team Championship (1 time)
12	2012	Spoiler 2000 (Tim Cowan)		Wrestling	Won the NWA Texas Heavyweight Championship (1 time), PCW Tag Team Championship (1 time)
13	2012	Jazz (Carlene Moore-Begnaud)		Wrestling	
14	2012	Kamala (James Harris)		Wrestling	Won the NWA Southeastern Heavyweight Championship (1 time), USWA Unified World Tag Team Championship (1 time)
15	2013	Killer Karl Kox (Herb Gerwig)		Wrestling	Won the NWA Brass Knuckles Championship (Amarillo version) (1 time), NWA Brass Knuckles Championship (Texas version) (3 times), NWA Texas Tag Team Championship (1 time)
16	2013	Black Bart (Rick Harris)		Wrestling, Refereeing, and Promoting	Won the GWF Brass Knuckles Championship (1 time), GWF Tag Team Championship (3 times), WCWA World Heavyweight Championship (1 time)
17	2013	James Beard	Travis Baxter	Refereeing	Referee for the Global Wrestling Federation
18	2013	Bruiser Brody (Frank Goodish)	Stan Hansen	Wrestling, Refereeing, and Promoting	Won the NWA American Heavyweight Championship (4 times), NWA American Tag Team Championship (3 times), NWA Brass Knuckles Championship (Texas version) (6 times), NWA Texas Heavyweight Championship (1 time), NWA Texas Tag Team Championship (3 times), NWA Western States Heavyweight Championship (1 time), SCW Southwest Brass Knuckles Championship (1 time), SCW World Tag Team Championship (1 time), WCWA Television Championship (1 time)
19	2013	Rick Davidson (Rick Davidson, Sr.)		Wrestling	
20	2013	Canyon (Canyon Lindley)		Wrestling	Won the IHWE Heavyweight Championship (1 time), LCW Heavyweight Championship (1 time), LCW Tag Team Title Championship (1 time), NWA Texas Hardcore Championship (2 times), NWA Texas Tag Team Championship (1 time), PCW Cruiserweight Championship (1 time), PCW Television Championship, PCW Tag Team Championship (2 times)
21	2014	Stan Hansen (John Stanley Hansen II)	William Hitch	Wrestling	Won the NWA Texas Tag Team Championship (1 time)
22	2014	Terry Gordy	James Beard	Wrestling	Won the GWF Tag Team Championship (1 time), NWA American Heavyweight Championship (1 time), NWA American Tag Team Championship (1 time), NWA Brass Knuckles Championship (Texas version) (1 time), NWA World Six-Man Tag Team Championship (Texas version) (6 times), WCWA World Six-Man Tag Team Championship (1 time)
23	2014	Devastation Incorporated	Travis Baxter	Wrestling	
24	2014	Awesome Kong (Dwayne McCullough)	Curtis T Tim Swiney; Crash	Wrestling	Won the USWA Unified World Heavyweight Championship (1 time)
25	2011	Matt Borne (Matt Osborne)	David Fuller; Matt Riviera	Wrestling	This was a special memorial induction.
26	2014	Rick Manning	Bullman Downs	Refereeing	Longtime referee for World Class Championship Wrestling.
27	2014	Khris Germany	Kit Carson	Wrestling, Refereeing, and Promoting	Won the NWA Texas Heavyweight Championship (1 time), NWA Texas Tag Team Championship (2 times), NWA World Tag Team Championship (3 times), XCW Tag Team Championship (4 times)
28	2014	Gary Young	Black Bart	Wrestling	Won the GWF North American Tag Team Championship (1 time), NWA American Tag Team Championship (1 time), NWA Western States Tag Team Championship (2 times), WCWA Texas Heavyweight Championship (2 times)
29	2014	Ray Evans	Max Muscles; Chris Devine; Crash Morris; Tim Swiney	Wrestling	Won the Big D Light Heavyweight Championship (1 time)
29	2014	Dusty Wolfe	Fred Urban	Wrestling	Won the XCW Ironman Championship (1 time)
30	2014	Todd Diamond (Todd Hecht)	Steve Moody	Wrestling, Refereeing, Promoting	
31	2014	Gary Tool	Canyon	Wrestling	Won the NWA Texas Hardcore Championship (1 time), NWA Texas Heavyweight Championship (1 time), NWA Texas Tag Team Championship (1 time), XCW Heavyweight Championship (3 times), XCW Tag Team Championship (1 time)
32	2015	Von Erich family		Wrestling	
33	2015	Marc Lowrance	David Fuller	Announcing and Commentating	
34	2015	Doyle King	Travis Baxter	Commentating	
35	2015	Mike McGuirk	James Beard	Announcing and Commentating	
36	2015	Leroy McGuirk	James Beard	Promoting and Wrestling	
37	2015	Jeff Bearden	Mike Foxx	Wrestling	Won the PCW Television Championship (1 time)
38	2015	Bullman Downs		Wrestling	Won the NAWA Tag Team Championship (1 time), XCW Heavyweight Championship (1 time)
39	2015	Steve Williams		Wrestling	Won the UWF World Heavyweight Championship (1 time), UWF World Tag Team Championship (1 time), UWF Mid-South Tag Team Championship (2 times)
40	2015	Steve Cox		Wrestling	Won the WCWA Tag Team Championship (1 time)
41	2015	Tim Storm		Wrestling	Won the NAWA Tag Team Championship (2 times), NMW Tag Team Championship (1 time), NWA Elite Tag Team Championship (1 time), NWA North American Heavyweight Championship (2 times), NWA Texoma Heavyweight Championship (2 times), NWA Texoma Tag Team Championship (1 time), PCW Heavyweight Championship (1 time), PCW Tag Team Championship (5 times), XCW Tag Team Championship (1 time)

== Footnotes ==
- ^{a} – Entries without a birth name indicates that the inductee did not perform under a ring name.
- ^{b} – This section mainly lists the major accomplishments of each inductee in the Texas wrestling territory.
