= Fred Ottman =

American retired professional wrestler (born 1956)

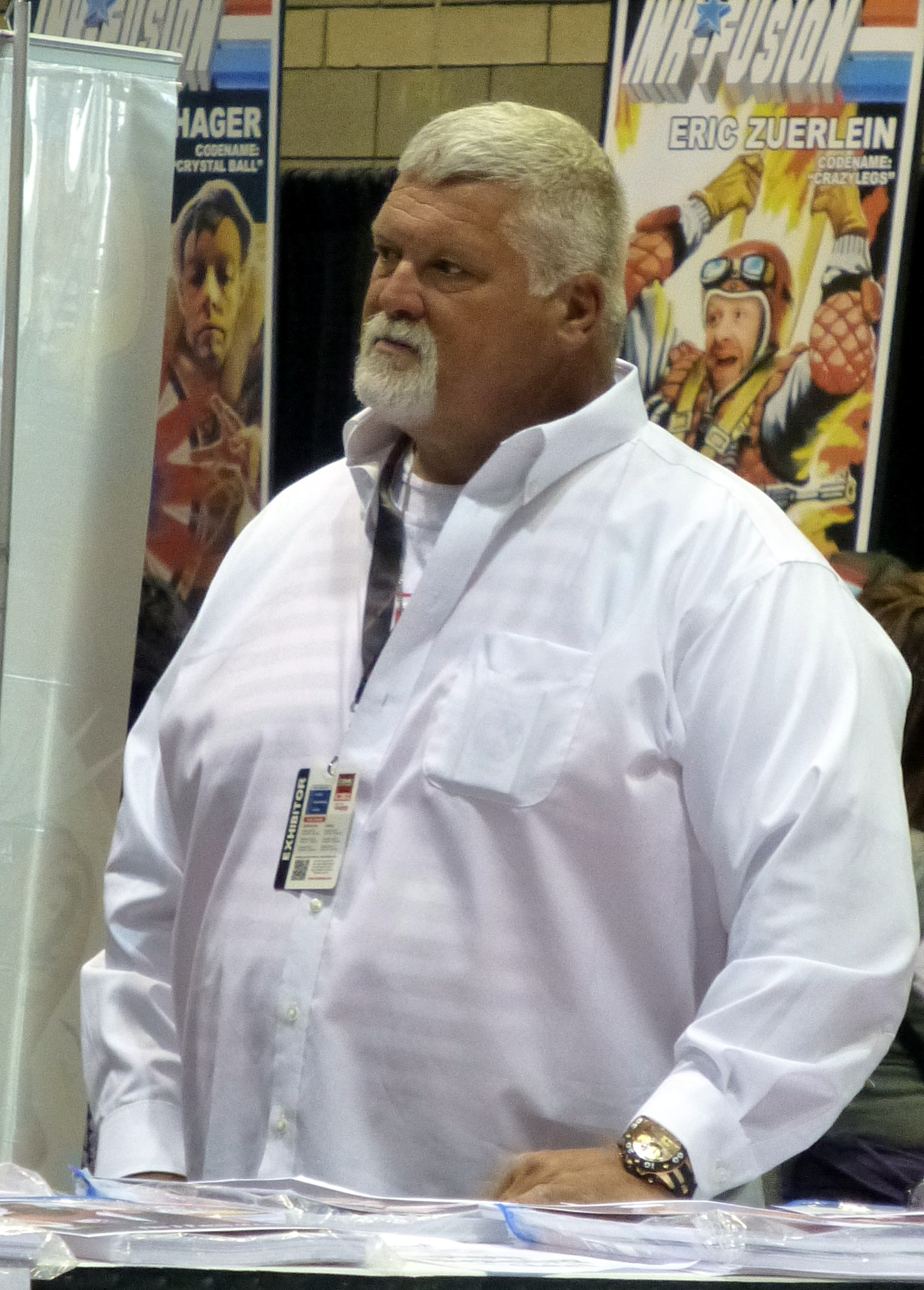
- Ottman in 2018

Personal information
- Born: Fred Ottman; August 10, 1956 (age 70) Miami, Florida, U.S.
- Education: Miami Senior High School (Miami, Florida)
- Spouse: Sheila Ottman (m. 1987)
- Children: 3
- Family: Dusty Rhodes (brother-in-law); Cody Rhodes (nephew); Dustin Rhodes (nephew)

Professional wrestling career
- Ring name(s): Big Bubba; Big Steel Man; The Dominator; The Shockmaster; Sigfried; Super Shockmaster; Hercules Haggerty; Uncle Fred; Stormy Poltrick Strain; Terminator; Tugboat; Tugboat Thomas; Tugboat Tyler; Tidal Wave; Typhoon
- Billed height: 6 ft 3 in (191 cm)
- Billed weight: 384 lb (174 kg)
- Billed from: Norfolk, Virginia
- Trained by: Boris Malenko
- Debut: 1984
- Retired: 2009

Fred Alex Ottman (born August 10, 1956) is an American retired professional wrestler. He worked for the World Wrestling Federation (later WWE) from 1989 to 1993 under the ring names Tugboat and Typhoon. As the former, he played a key babyface ally of Hulk Hogan. As the latter, he turned heel to form The Natural Disasters with Earthquake and held the WWF Tag Team Championship.

In 1993, Ottman debuted as The Shockmaster in World Championship Wrestling and immediately fell over, losing his mask on live television while his teammates broke character and laughed. This botch hurt his career, and is now generally regarded as the worst debut in wrestling history, but he was able to capitalize on its notoriety after his in-ring retirement.

On April 19, 2025, Ottman, as Typhoon, was inducted into the WWE Hall of Fame Class of 2025 alongside Earthquake as The Natural Disasters.

== Professional wrestling career ==
=== Early career (1984–1988) ===
Ottman was trained by Boris Malenko and got his start as Sigfried the Giant in February 1985, for Championship Wrestling from Georgia. He later wrestled for Texas All-Star Wrestling and the Continental Wrestling Association as Big Bubba. He wrestled as Big Bubba in 1986 and 1987 in Memphis for Jerry Jarrett's CWA wrestling where he teamed with Goliath as the Downtown Connection and was initially managed by Downtown Bruno.

=== Championship Wrestling from Florida (1988–1989) ===
In September 1988, Ottman wrestled on the Gordon Solie-hosted TV shows of Championship Wrestling from Florida as a heel called Big Steel Man, managed by Diamond Dallas Page. He feuded with Dusty Rhodes, among others. He defeated Rhodes for the NWA Florida Heavyweight Championship on May 13, 1989.

=== World Wrestling Federation (1989–1993) ===
==== Tugboat (1989–1991) ====
Ottman made his first appearance in the WWF in June 1989 in a dark match under the ring name "Big Steel Man" with Slick as his manager. He wrestled three more dark matches that summer, defeating Paul Roma and Boris Zukhov, and losing to Mr. Perfect.

That September, his name was changed to "Tugboat Tyler", then "Tugboat Thomas", as he portrayed a fan favorite on house shows, defeating the likes of Barry Horowitz, The Brooklyn Brawler and Boris Zhukov. He debuted on WWF television on the January 27, 1990 episode of Superstars under the Tugboat Thomas moniker and defeated Iron Mike Sharpe. His ring name was soon after shortened to "Tugboat". His costume consisted of a red striped shirt, white pants, and a sailor's hat. Part of his gimmick included miming pulling the cord of an airhorn and making a "Toot-toot" noise, like a horn of a ship. On the May 20 episode of Wrestling Challenge, Hulk Hogan cut a promo explaining that he personally trained Tugboat and brought him to the WWF. Following Tugboat's win on that very same show Hogan came out into the ring and raised his arm, showing his full support. Tugboat rallied fans to send encouraging letters to Hogan after Hogan was brutally attacked by Earthquake. Tugboat aided Hulk Hogan in his feud with Earthquake and "Canada's Strongest Man" Dino Bravo. This coincided with a substantial push that saw Tugboat emerging victorious on television against numerous opponents. He made his pay-per-view debut at that November's Survivor Series, where he teamed with Hogan, The Big Boss Man and Hacksaw Jim Duggan to face the team of Earthquake, Dino Bravo, Haku and The Barbarian. Tugboat was eliminated when he and Earthquake fought to a double count-out, and Hogan went on to be the sole survivor. Tugboat was the first true test of The Undertaker, who defeated him in numerous matches between December 1990 and March 1991. Tugboat received a shot at Mr. Perfect's Intercontinental Championship on the May 5, 1991 episode of Wrestling Challenge, but was unsuccessful.

==== Natural Disasters (1991–1993) ====
In May 1991, Ottman teased a heel turn by eliminating Hulk Hogan in a battle royal on NBC's Saturday Night's Main Event XXIX. Ottman completed the turn on the June 15 episode of WWF Superstars. Tugboat and The Bushwhackers were facing The Nasty Boys and Earthquake in a six-man tag team match when Tugboat attacked his teammates, allowing Earthquake to hit the Earthquake Splash on Bushwhacker Luke and pin him. On the June 17 episode of Prime Time Wrestling, Earthquake's manager, Jimmy Hart, reintroduced Ottman as Typhoon, and he and Earthquake became known as The Natural Disasters. As part of the character change, Ottman began wearing a red, white and black singlet with a tidal wave on the front and "Typhoon" in black letters under it (to match the design on Earthquake's wrestling gear, seismograph lines and "Earthquake" in red letters across the middle).

The Natural Disasters dumped Hart and turned into fan favorites in early 1992 – with Ottman's heel run having lasted less than seven months – feuding with Hart's new top team, Money Inc. ("Million Dollar Man" Ted DiBiase and Irwin R. Schyster). On April 17 they won the SWS Tag Team Championship defeating George Takano and Shunji Takano in Yokohama, Japan when WWF had a partnership with Super World of Sports. In July the Natural Disasters defeated Money Inc. to win the WWF Tag Team Championship. They lost the title to Money Inc. three months later. After Earthquake took a leave of absence from the WWF early in 1993, Ottman wrestled in singles matches before leaving the company in early summer. He worked house shows against Terry Taylor in the spring. He also put over a returning Bam Bam Bigelow in a series of house shows, and twice on televised Raw shows. He wrestled two televised matches against Yokozuna, losing one by pinfall and winning the other by disqualification. His final match saw him defeat The Predator in a house show match in Tampa on July 18.

=== World Championship Wrestling (1993–1994) ===
==== The Shockmaster (1993–1994) ====
After departing from the WWF, Ottman found himself at the center of one of the most infamous moments in wrestling history. As The Shockmaster, he signed with World Championship Wrestling (WCW) and was to make his debut in a match alongside the fan favorite team of Sting, Dustin Rhodes and Davey Boy Smith in the upcoming eight-man WarGames match against the heel team composed of Sid Vicious, Big Van Vader, Kane and Kole at Fall Brawl.

On "A Flair for the Gold", an interview segment hosted by Ric Flair, in front of a live audience at Clash of the Champions XXIV, Sting and Smith were confronted by Sid and Harlem Heat, demanding to know the identity of their new partner. Sting exclaimed, "All I have to say is, our partner is going to shock the world, because he is none other than the Shockmaster!" The camera then zoomed in on a section of the set where two torches set off a small pyrotechnics explosion in front of a sheetrock wall. With a new costume consisting of a Star Wars Stormtrooper helmet painted purple and covered in silver glitter, a pair of jeans and a large, black, puffy vest, Ottman attempted to make a dramatic entrance by crashing through the wall.

While making his entrance, Ottman tripped over a piece of lumber that was framing the set, causing him to fall forward through the wall with his helmet falling off and sliding across the floor. His face accidentally exposed, he scrambled to put the helmet back on as Vicious, restraining laughter, exclaimed "Oh, God!", while Flair could also be heard saying "Oh no" under his breath. Ottman donned the helmet and got back on his feet, shifting his weight and dusting his hands off in an attempt to shrug off the gaffe while Harlem Heat's Kole asked, "Who is this motherfucker?" and Smith exclaimed "He fell flat on his arse! He fell flat on his fucking arse!". Both of these comments were audible to the live audience and television viewers, but were bleeped in future showings of the footage by WWE. Ottman then began gesturing toward his would-be opponents several seconds before a menacing gravelly off-screen voice (provided by Ole Anderson, who could be heard laughing before speaking) started to threaten Sid and Vader. Sid Vicious, remaining in character, reacted in rage to Shockmaster, and the broadcast focused on Vicious for the duration of the voiceover. The announcers said nothing as the segment ended.

Dusty Rhodes later claimed, on an episode of WWE 24/7's Legends of Wrestling show, the piece of lumber previously wasn't there during a successful practice run and it was later put there by David Crockett without informing Ottman. WWE, on its official website, wrote, "There is a case to be made that The Shockmaster's debut at WCW Clash of the Champions XXIV is the greatest of all time – albeit for all the wrong reasons." The organization has also described the incident as "one of the most unintentionally funny moments in sports entertainment history," and "a debacle many still consider one of the worst gaffes in the history of sports-entertainment." While Ottman was initially displeased with the turn of events, he now finds humor in the incident.

They put me in a Storm Trooper mask which they painted and covered in glitter, I couldn't see a thing. I got to the wall and put my hands up like a double axe handle and bust through. The top broke perfectly, but the bottom didn't give. The momentum took me through the wall and to the floor.

— Ottman on The Shockmaster's debut

Despite generating no crowd reaction, WCW tried to continue with the angle, repackaging The Shockmaster character as a klutz in a series of pre-recorded promos (featuring Ottman in different attire, without a mask and using his own voice). It was this version of the character that went on to appear as planned in the main event of Fall Brawl, teaming with Sting, Dustin Rhodes and Davey Boy Smith in the War Games match. His ring attire for his match was a plain white shirt, jeans and a white construction worker's helmet, very different to the character in its infamous debut. He entered last into the match and actually gained the victory for his team by forcing Kole to submit to a bear hug.

This version of the character remained reasonably popular with live crowds and continued to appear at the final three pay-per-view events of the year. At Halloween Havoc he teamed up with Ice Train and Charlie Norris in a six-man tag match against Harlem Heat (Kole and Kane) and The Equalizer. The Shockmaster again scored the victory for his team by pinning Kole. Next at Battlebowl he took part in the Lethal Lottery tournament and was drawn to team with Paul Orndorff to face the team of bitter rivals Ricky Steamboat and Lord Steven Regal. Steamboat and Regal imploded and Shockmaster was able to pick up the win for his team after Steamboat hit Regal. In the Battlebowl Final battle royal Shockmaster was eliminated around the halfway point by the Nasty Boys. In the final pay-per-view of the year Starrcade he faced Awesome Kong (accompanied by King Kong). After both attacked the Shockmaster at the start of the match, bizarrely King Kong actually wrestled instead of his partner and the Shockmaster picked up a quick victory over him. He changed his name to "The Super Shockmaster" and departed in January 1994. He was also known as "Uncle Fred". However, he did make a brief appearance on the March 12, 1994 episode of WCW Saturday Night, when Mean Gene Okerlund visited the set of Hulk Hogan's TV series Thunder in Paradise.

In 2009, Shawn Michaels, Triple H, and Dusty Rhodes appeared on a segment of WWE Raw to discuss the DVD release of The Rise and Fall of WCW when Triple H brought up the subject of the Shockmaster's debut. During that segment, the WWE recreated the Shockmaster's stumbling through the wall, with Santino Marella portraying the character and Arn Anderson providing the voice. Anderson fled from the camera when the other wrestlers pointed at him.

On February 22, 2016, Ottman returned as The Shockmaster for an episode of the WWE Network show, The Edge and Christian Show That Totally Reeks of Awesomeness. On the show, The Shockmaster was given the opportunity to redeem the famous debut incident by walking through the show's banner.

=== World Wrestling Federation (1994) ===
Ottman returned to the WWF as Typhoon in May 1994, taking the place of his former partner Earthquake in house show matches against Yokozuna after Earthquake left the WWF. Typhoon made his return to television on the June 25 episode of Superstars (taped May 25), defeating Quebecer Pierre. He then primarily lost matches to Yokozuna on television and at house shows before departing in August.

=== Late career (1994–2001, 2025) ===
After leaving the WWF in August 1994, Ottman, still using the Typhoon name, began wrestling on the independent circuit in the East Coast. In December 1995, he went to Japan to compete in a one-night tag team tournament, held by WAR. He teamed up with Shinja and advanced to the semi-finals, before losing to Genichiro Tenryu and Ultimo Dragon. In March 1996, he wrestled a tour of Malaysia for the National Wrestling Alliance feuding with King Kong Bundy.

By the late 1990s, he was wrestling primarily in Florida, where he competed for FOW and WXO. In WXO, he was given the name The Dominator and his gimmick was that he was too big to get out of his own car. He lost to NWA World Heavyweight Champion Dan Severn on November 7, 1997, in Gainesville, Florida. On May 27, 2000, as Typhoon he defeated One Man Gang and Ron Harris in a 3-way match for the Wrestling In Ashwaubenon independent show in Ashwaubenon, Wisconsin.

In 2000, he briefly appeared in the iGW promotion as a manager named Sugar Daddy.

Ottman was one of the participants in the 20-man Gimmick Battle Royal match at WrestleMania X-Seven as Tugboat, and was eliminated by his former partner, Earthquake. He retired soon thereafter.

On March 12, 2025, during an interview with Bill Apter, Apter revealed that Ottman, along with his best friend and longtime tag team partner John Tenta, under their The Natural Disasters gimmick, will be inducted into the WWE Hall of Fame Class of 2025. Ottman added that he heard the news about it from Bruce Prichard via phone call. WWE later officially confirmed the induction on March 24.

=== Return to wrestling (2009) ===
On September 5, 2009, Ottman returned to the ring as Tugboat losing to Martin Nolte at DWA 10 years event in Uelzen, Germany. He returned to North America on November 21 as Tugboat defeating Jason Static at ECPW in New York City. He once again retired.

== Other media ==
In 1992, he appeared as Typhoon (along with Earthquake) in the SNES version of the video game WWF Super WrestleMania. The Disasters were absent from the Sega version. On February 23, 2016, he appeared as downloadable content for WWE 2K16. He appears along with Earthquake in WWE 2K17 and WWE 2K18 as well. In 2K18, the Shockmaster helmet (slightly modified as to avoid any copyright disputes with the Star Wars license) and the Typhoon singlet are available in the game's attire creation suite, and can be worn by any character in the game.

On a two-part episode of the 1994 TV series Thunder in Paradise, Ottman played a palace guard named Yussef. He is also parodied in the 2014 RPG LISA as Shocklord.

On a two-part episode of the 1998 TV series Mortal Kombat: Conquest, Ottman played Z'dak, in the second episode his name was featured solely in the credits though.

== Personal life ==
Ottman retired from wrestling after WXO folded in 2001. In 2007 he lived in Lakeland, Florida, and worked as a safety manager for Gaffin Industrial Services, a building cleaning service. He also coached the little league team of his two sons and daughter. His son, Berkley, currently serves as the timekeeper for the WWE. He is the brother-in-law of pro wrestler Dusty Rhodes. He is one of the two uncles of Cody Rhodes and Dustin Rhodes, the other being Jerry Sags.

Ottman married Sheila who is Dusty Rhodes's sister making Ottman and Rhodes brother-in-laws and have three children.

== Championships and accomplishments ==
- Continental Wrestling Association
  - AWA International Heavyweight Championship (1 time)
  - AWA Southern Tag Team Championship (2 times) – with Jerry Lawler (1 time) and Goliath (1 time)
- Championship Wrestling from Florida
  - NWA Florida Heavyweight Championship (1 time)
- International Wrestling Association
  - IWA United States Heavyweight Championship (1 time)
  - IWW Intercontinental Championship (1 time)
- Super World of Sports
  - SWS Tag Team Championship (1 time) – with Earthquake
- Universal Superstars of America
  - USA Heavyweight Championship (1 time)
- World Wrestling Federation/WWE
  - WWF Tag Team Championship (1 time) – with Earthquake
  - WWE Hall of Fame (Class of 2025) – as a member of The Natural Disasters
- Wrestling Observer Newsletter
  - Worst Gimmick (1993) (as The Shockmaster)

== See also ==
- The Natural Disasters
