= Terry Gordy =

American professional wrestler (1961–2001)

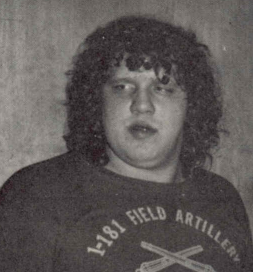
- Gordy, c. 1985

Personal information
- Born: Terry Ray Gordy; April 23, 1961 Rossville, Georgia, U.S.
- Died: July 16, 2001 (aged 40) Soddy-Daisy, Tennessee, U.S.
- Cause of death: Heart attack
- Spouse: Connie Gordy (m. 1979)
- Children: 3; including Ray Gordy
- Family: Richard Slinger (nephew)

Professional wrestling career
- Ring name(s): The Executioner; Forest Druid; Terry "Bam Bam" Gordy; Terry Mecca
- Billed height: 6 ft 4 in (193 cm)
- Billed weight: 289 lb (131 kg)
- Billed from: "Badstreet U.S.A."; Chattanooga, Tennessee "Dark Forest"; New York City
- Trained by: Archie Gouldie; Lou Thesz
- Debut: September 19, 1977

Terry Ray Gordy Sr. (April 23, 1961 – July 16, 2001) was an American professional wrestler. Gordy appeared in the United States with professional wrestling promotions such as Mid-South Wrestling, Georgia Championship Wrestling, World Class Championship Wrestling, Jim Crockett Promotions/World Championship Wrestling and the Universal Wrestling Federation as a member of the Fabulous Freebirds. He also appeared in Japan with All Japan Pro Wrestling as one-half of the Miracle Violence Connection.

Gordy held many championships throughout the course of his career, including the Triple Crown Heavyweight Championship, AJPW World Tag Team Championship, WCW World Tag Team Championship, NWA World Tag Team Championship, UWF Heavyweight Championship and SMW Heavyweight Championship. He was posthumously inducted into the Wrestling Observer Newsletter Hall of Fame, Professional Wrestling Hall of Fame and Museum, and WWE Hall of Fame. His son, Ray Gordy, also wrestled.

== Professional wrestling career ==
=== Early career (1974–1980) ===
Gordy was a standout high school football and baseball player at Rossville High School, but dropped out of high school following his freshman year. Trained by Archie Gouldie, he started wrestling at the age of 13 in 1974 as "Terry Mecca" for the International Wrestling Association.

In early 1979, Gordy began wrestling under his real name and formed the Fabulous Freebirds with Michael Hayes, with Buddy Roberts later added to the group. Gordy and Hayes had met while training in Mississippi the year prior.

=== Georgia Championship Wrestling (1980–1982) ===
Gordy, c. 1981

In 1980, the Freebirds moved to Georgia Championship Wrestling, where they won the NWA Georgia Tag Team Championship. The Fabulous Freebirds had many feuds while there, including feuds against Tommy Rich, Junkyard Dog, Kevin Sullivan, Austin Idol, and Ted DiBiase, and they became one of the first acts to use entrance music. One match on the Saturday night WTBS Georgia Championship Wrestling show saw the Freebirds take on the Junkyard Dog and Ted DiBiase; toward the end of the match, Gordy gave DiBiase four consecutive piledrivers, which led to DiBiase being taken away in an ambulance.

In 1981, the Freebirds split up after Buddy Roberts left the area. Michael and Terry then had a falling out, which led to them feuding against each other. Terry and Michael eventually put their differences aside and reformed the Freebirds as a duo in 1982, and they feuded with Ole Anderson and Stan Hansen.

=== World Class Championship Wrestling (1982–1989) ===
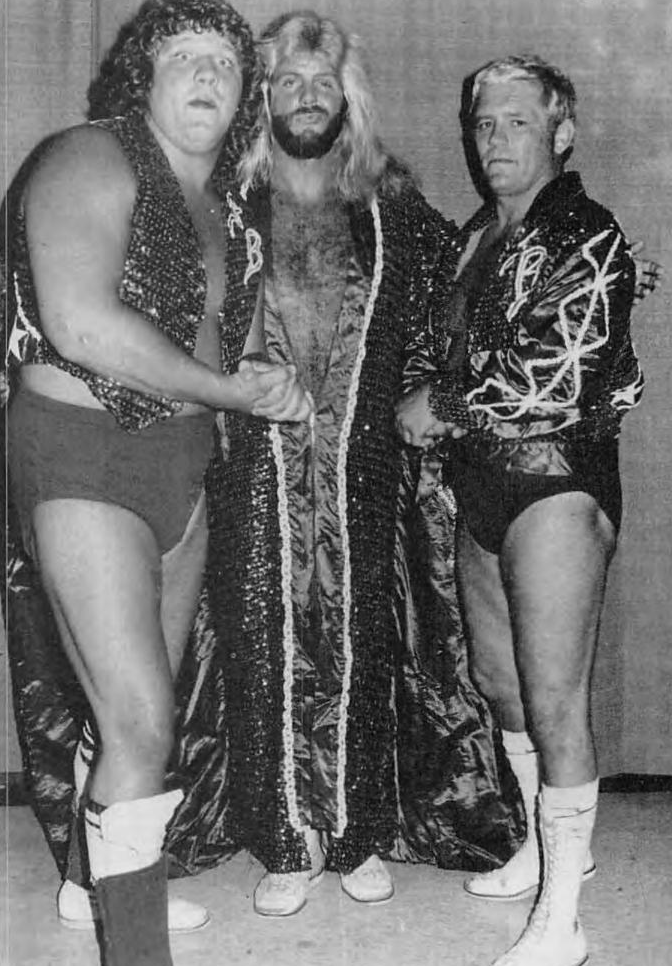
Gordy (left), c. 1985

In late 1982, the Freebirds went to the Dallas, Texas-based World Class Championship Wrestling promotion and feuded with the Von Erichs (David, Kevin, Kerry and Mike). The feud ignited when Gordy slammed the cage door on Kerry during his cage match on March 15 at WCCW Star Wars against Ric Flair, during which Michael Hayes served as the special guest referee. Gordy's action incited a riot among the fans in attendance. The Freebirds and Von Erichs traded the six-man title back and forth a few times over the years. At one point, Gordy was also one half of the WCCW American Tag Team Champions. While in WCCW, Killer Khan taught Gordy how to perform the Oriental Spike, which he dubbed the Asiatic Spike.

=== All Japan Pro Wrestling (1982, 1983–1994) ===
Gordy's connection with All Japan Pro Wrestling began in March 1982, when he challenged Giant Baba for the PWF Heavyweight Championship at a Georgia Championship Wrestling show at the Omni in Atlanta. The match would air in Japan. Seventeen months later, Gordy made his debut for AJPW in August 1983. He was immediately paired with Stan Hansen and took part in Terry Funk's first retirement match on August 31, 1983. It was during this time that Lou Thesz taught Gordy what would be his main move, the powerbomb.

In 1984, Gordy returned to AJPW with his Fabulous Freebird teammates Michael Hayes and Buddy Roberts. He and Hayes unsuccessfully challenged for the NWA International Tag Team Championship twice. On his own, he challenged Jumbo Tsuruta for the NWA International Heavyweight Championship, but was disqualified. By the end of 1984, Hayes and Roberts had left AJPW, leaving Gordy on his own. In June 1985, he rematched Tsuruta for the NWA International Heavyweight title but was counted out. In March 1986, he had another rematch with Tsuruta for the NWA International title but lost. Two months later, Gordy received a chance to win the PWF Heavyweight title, then held by Riki Choshu, but he lost by disqualification. In August 1986, he began teaming with Killer Khan, who had taught him the Asiatic Spike a couple years earlier, while both were in WCCW. He and Khan took part in the 1986 World's Strongest Tag Determination League, where they placed third with eight points.

By November 1987, Gordy had reunited with Hansen for the 1987 World's Strongest Tag Determination League, where they placed second in a four-way tie with three different teams. In July 1988, Gordy and Hansen defeated Jumbo Tsuruta and Yoshiaki Yatsu to win the World Tag Team Championship, before losing them back to Tsuruta and Yatsu two days later. It wasn't until December 1988 that Gordy and Hansen won the World Tag Team titles for the second time by winning the 1988 World's Strongest Tag Determination League, defeating Genichiro Tenryu and Toshiaki Kawada in the finals. They lost the titles again to Tsuruta and Yatsu two months later in a rare title change outside Japan——the match was held in the United States. Gordy and Hansen continued to team up until June 1989. He took Bill Irwin as his partner for the 1989 World's Strongest Tag Determination League, but the pairing didn't work, as they placed seventh with six points.

In February 1990, Gordy teamed up with Steve Williams as the Miracle Violence Connection. The pairing was an immediate success. A month later, they won the World Tag Team Championship, defeating Gordy's former partner Stan Hansen and Genichiro Tenryu. Three months later, Gordy became a double champion with five belts, as Gordy defeated Jumbo Tsuruta for the Triple Crown Heavyweight Championship. The elation would be short-lived, as three days later, he lost the Triple Crown to Stan Hansen. Gordy rebounded a month later, defeating Hansen to regain the Triple Crown for the second time, but two days later, he and Williams lost the World Tag Team titles to Tsuruta and The Great Kabuki.

On July 26, 1990, after returning to Tokyo from a show in Isesaki, where he and Williams defeated Stan Hansen and Terry Taylor, Gordy collapsed while drinking at a bar and was taken by ambulance to a local hospital. At one point, he suffered a cardiac arrest. His condition was so grim that AJPW officials were prepared to announce his death. Thankfully, he regained consciousness the next day and vacated the Triple Crown title. He returned a month later but never received another shot at the Triple Crown.

A month after his near-death experience, Gordy was back, as he and Williams resumed their path of destruction. In December 1990, they regained the World Tag Team titles by winning the 1990 World's Strongest Tag Determination League, defeating Stan Hansen and Dan Spivey in the finals. They held onto the titles until April 1991, when they dropped them to Hansen and Spivey. Three months later, Gordy and Williams regained the titles, but lost them nearly three weeks later to Mitsuharu Misawa and Toshiaki Kawada. Five months later, they regained the titles and won the 1991 World's Strongest Tag Determination League, defeating Misawa and Kawada in the finals. In March 1992, they lost the titles to Jumbo Tsuruta and Akira Taue. It was around that time they split their time between AJPW and WCW. They took part in the 1992 World's Strongest Tag Determination League but placed second in a tie with the team of Hansen and Johnny Ace.

1993 saw Gordy wrestle exclusively for AJPW. In January 1993, he and Williams won their final World Tag Team title together, defeating Mitsuharu Misawa and Toshiaki Kawada. They held onto the belts until May, when they lost them to Kawada and Akira Taue. His final tour as an active gaijin took place in July 1993; his last match took place on July 29, when he and Williams defeated Johnny Ace and Kendall Windham.

On August 18, 1993, while traveling from the United States to Japan to take part in another AJPW tour, Gordy overdosed on pain medication and slipped into a five-day coma, ultimately suffering permanent brain damage. As a result, he had to relearn how to talk, walk, and wrestle, but he never again possessed the skills at the same level. He returned to AJPW for a single tour in July 1994 before leaving the company after more than a decade.

=== World Wrestling Federation (1984) ===
The Fabulous Freebirds debuted in the World Wrestling Federation (WWF) in August 1984. During their nine-week stint in the WWF, they primary competed in six-man tag team matches and tag team matches, with their main opponents being the Moondogs. Several of their matches aired on WWF on PRISM Network, WWF on MSG Network, WWF Maple Leaf Wrestling, and WWF Championship Wrestling. In September 1984, they were abruptly fired from the WWF after showing up late and drunk for a show.

=== Universal Wrestling Federation (1986) ===
In 1986, when the Freebirds were in Universal Wrestling Federation, the former Mid South Wrestling, Gordy became the first person to win the UWF Heavyweight Championship and held it for six months, before losing it via forfeit to the One Man Gang, after an angle the same night in which Gordy was injured in an auto accident by "Dr. Death" Steve Williams, whom he feuded with. During this time, Gordy and the Freebirds had an ongoing feud with "Hacksaw" Jim Duggan, in which Duggan and Gordy squared off, usually ending in a disqualification because of outside interference.

=== Jim Crockett Promotions / World Championship Wrestling (1987, 1989, 1992) ===
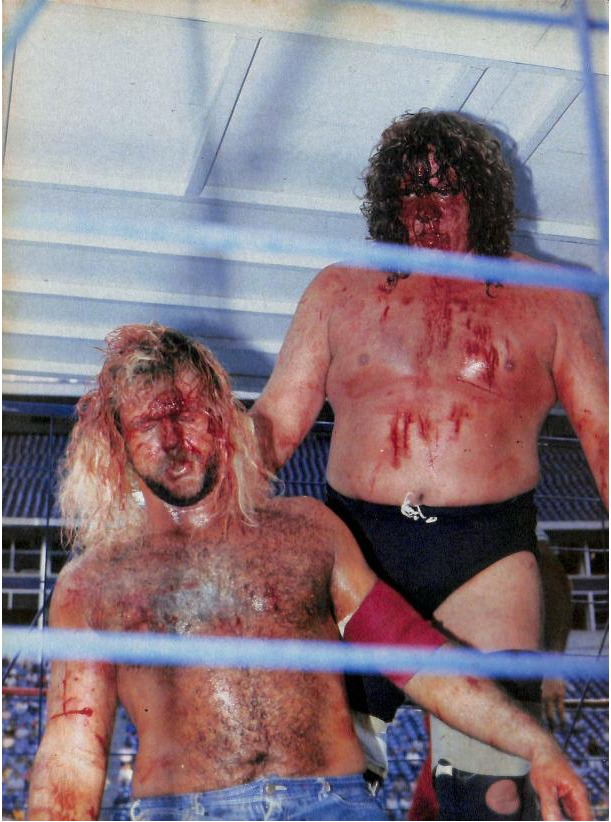
Gordy (right), c. 1988

The Freebirds spent some time in Jim Crockett Promotions where they split to feud briefly but later reunited. In 1989, Gordy helped Hayes reform the Freebirds, with Jimmy Garvin, in the NWA, which became World Championship Wrestling in 1991. Later, he and Steve Williams defeated the Steiners to become World Tag Team Champions.

Gordy and Williams returned to World Championship Wrestling (WCW) in 1992 and won the WCW World Tag Team Championship. At that point, they were considered the most dominant team in wrestling, making $10,000 to $15,000 a week. They also won the NWA World Tag Team Championship in a tournament at the Great American Bash card in Albany, Georgia, one week later, thereby unifying the titles. Their feud with the Steiner Brothers in Japan was hyped as a feud between the best foreign teams of the two top Japanese promotions (the Steiners were competing for rival New Japan Pro-Wrestling at the time). Despite advances by New Japan, Gordy and Williams, out of loyalty to the AJPW founder and promoter, Giant Baba, refused to compete for the promotion (which had business ties with WCW at the time), leading to Gordy's departure from WCW before Halloween Havoc and Williams' departure after Starrcade.

=== Various promotions (1989–1994) ===
After World Class folded in 1989, Gordy wrestled in various promotions. He started working for United States Wrestling Association (USWA). In 1991, he worked for Universal Wrestling Federation where he feuded with Don Muraco. In 1994, he reunited with The Freebirds (Michael Hayes and Jimmy Garvin) for Global Wrestling Federation in Texas, where they feuded with Skandor Akbar, John Hawk, Black Bart and Moadib and won the Tag Team Championship with Garvin.

=== Smoky Mountain Wrestling (1992, 1994, 1995) ===
In February 1992, Gordy debuted for Smoky Mountain Wrestling, defeating Tommy Angel, but by the time the match aired, he had left for WCW. He would not return until August 1994 at the Night of the Legends, where he unsuccessfully challenged Tony Anthony for the SMW Heavyweight Championship by getting himself disqualified. By June 1995, Gordy was back wrestling full-time for SMW, this time under Jim Cornette's "Militia" stable. While in the Militia, he regularly teamed with Tommy Rich. After a brief feud with Boo Bradley over the summer, Gordy set his sights on the SMW Heavyweight Championship, then held by Brad Armstrong. Gordy won the SMW Heavyweight Championship by defeating Armstrong when he teamed with Thrasher to defeat Armstrong and the Wolfman on October 27. A month later, on November 23, he dropped the title back to Armstrong in a Country Whipping match. Three days later, SMW folded.

=== Extreme Championship Wrestling (1996) ===
In 1996, Gordy appeared in Extreme Championship Wrestling to challenge Raven for the ECW World Heavyweight title, as the "internationally recognized #1 contender". He had worked for the International Wrestling Association of Japan promotion, wrestling deathmatches. He lost, but went on to team up with Tommy Dreamer and later reunite with "Dr. Death" Steve Williams to wrestle The Eliminators. He also wrestled Bam Bam Bigelow at Ultimate Jeopardy in what was billed as the second ever "Battle Of The Bam Bams" (The first happened on a Windy City Wrestling show), which he lost due to outside interference from The Eliminators.

=== World Wrestling Federation (1996–1997) ===
In September 1996, Gordy returned to the World Wrestling Federation, losing to Savio Vega in a dark match at a taping of WWF Superstars. He was subsequently repackaged as "The Executioner", a "hired assassin" and ally of Mankind, with both men managed by Paul Bearer. As "The Executioner", Gordy wore a mask and carried an axe. The Executioner made his television debut at In Your House 11: Buried Alive on October 20, 1996, enabling Mankind to defeat The Undertaker in a Buried Alive match by hitting The Undertaker with a shovel and helping "bury" him. This led to an "Armageddon Rules match" between The Executioner and The Undertaker at In Your House 12: It's Time on December 15 that was won by The Undertaker. The Executioner went on to team with Mankind to unsuccessfully challenge Owen Hart and the British Bulldog for the WWF World Tag Team Championship before leaving the WWF in January 1997.

On an episode of Something to Wrestle With, Bruce Prichard claimed that the gimmick of The Executioner was given to Gordy because McMahon had doubts that Gordy could still compete effectively, and the use of a mask was intended to protect Gordy so that if that were the case, Gordy's legacy would not be tainted. Had Gordy been able to compete at a high level, there would have been an opportunity for Gordy to unmask. It was mentioned that the hiring was mostly done as a favor for Michael Hayes.

=== Later career (1997–2001) ===
After leaving the WWF and Japan, Gordy worked in the independent circuit. On February 21, 1998, Gordy teamed with Dan Severn in a losing effort to Doug Gilbert and Dutch Mantel at the Eddie Gilbert Memorial Show for IWA Mid-South. Gordy would reunite with Hayes as they fought Glen Kulka and JR Smooth to a no contest for Power Pro Wrestling on May 28, 1999. He wrestled his last match, returning to IWA Japan on February 4, 2001, with Shoichi Ichimiya, Tomohiro Ishii, Yukihide Ueno, and Yuji Kito, defeating Doug Gilbert, TJ Shinjuku, Ultra Sebun, Takashi Uwano and Keizo Mastuda.

== Personal life ==
Gordy has two daughters and a son, Ray Gordy, and the latter wrestled for WWE as "Jesse" and "Slam Master J" before his release in 2010. His nephew is Richard Aslinger, who competed for All Japan Pro Wrestling as Richard Slinger. His daughter Miranda currently wrestles on the independent circuit and competed in Japan. He was known for his "high octane, southern lifestyle" outside of the ring.

== Death and legacy ==
Gordy was found dead in his home in Soddy-Daisy, Tennessee on July 16, 2001, after suffering a heart attack caused by a blood clot. He was 40 years old.

Following his death, the Terry Gordy Memorial Show was held in his honor on August 11 in Birmingham, Alabama. Various wrestlers including Fabulous Freebirds cohort Michael Hayes and former tag team partner Stan Hansen praised Gordy for being one of the best workers they ever worked with. In 2014, he was posthumously inducted into the Southern Wrestling Hall of Fame. A year later, he was posthumously inducted into the Professional Wrestling Hall of Fame and Museum. On April 2, 2016, Gordy was posthumously inducted into the WWE Hall of Fame by his son as part of the Fabulous Freebirds.

== Championships and accomplishments ==
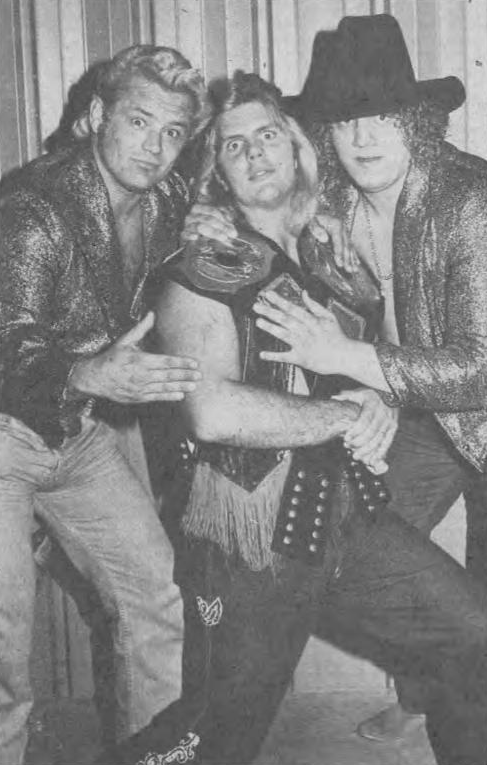
Gordy (right) as NWA Georgia Tag Team Champion, c. 1981.

- All Japan Pro Wrestling
  - Triple Crown Heavyweight Championship (2 times)
  - World Tag Team Championship (7 times) – with Stan Hansen (2) and "Dr. Death" Steve Williams (5)
  - World's Strongest Tag Determination League (1988, 1990, 1991) – with Stan Hansen (1988) and Steve Williams (1990, 1991)
  - World's Strongest Tag Determination League Fighting Spirit Award (1989) – with Bill Irwin
- Georgia Championship Wrestling
  - NWA Georgia Tag Team Championship (1 time) – with Michael Hayes
  - NWA National Tag Team Championship (4 times) – with Michael Hayes (3) and Jimmy Snuka (1)
- Global Wrestling Federation
  - GWF Tag Team Championship (1 time) – with Jimmy Garvin
- International Championship Wrestling
  - ICW Mississippi Heavyweight Championship (1 time)
- Mid-South Wrestling / Universal Wrestling Federation
  - Mid-South Louisiana Championship (1 time)
  - Mid-South Mississippi Heavyweight Championship (1 time)
  - Mid-South Tag Team Championship (2 times) – with Michael Hayes (1) and Buddy Roberts
  - UWF Heavyweight Championship (1 time)
  - UWF Heavyweight Championship Tournament (1986)
- NWA Mid-America
  - NWA Mid-America Tag Team Championship (2 times) – with Michael Hayes
- Professional Wrestling Hall of Fame
  - Class of 2015 as a member of The Fabulous Freebirds
- Pro Wrestling Illustrated
  - PWI Most Improved Wrestler of the Year (1986)
  - PWI Tag Team of the Year (1981) – with Michael Hayes
  - Tag Team of the Year (1992) – with Steve Williams
  - Ranked No. 31 of the top 500 singles wrestlers in the PWI 500 in 1992
  - Ranked No. 36 of the top 500 singles wrestlers of the "PWI Years" in 2003
  - Ranked No. 3, 16, and 34 of the top 100 tag teams of the "PWI Years" with Michael Hayes, Steve Williams, and Stan Hansen, respectively, in 2003
- Southeastern Championship Wrestling
  - NWA Alabama Heavyweight Championship (1 time)
  - NWA Southeastern Heavyweight Championship (Northern Division) (1 time)
- Smoky Mountain Wrestling
  - SMW Heavyweight Championship (1 time)
- Texas Wrestling Hall of Fame
  - Class of 2014
- World Championship Wrestling
  - NWA World Tag Team Championship (1 time, inaugural) – with Steve Williams
  - WCW World Tag Team Championship (1 time) – with Steve Williams
  - NWA World Tag Team Championship Tournament (1992) – Steve Williams
- World Class Championship Wrestling / World Class Wrestling Association
  - NWA American Heavyweight Championship (1 time)
  - NWA American Tag Team Championship (1 time) – with Michael Hayes
  - NWA Brass Knuckles Championship (Texas version) (1 time)
  - NWA World Six-Man Tag Team Championship (Texas version) (6 times) – with Michael Hayes & Buddy Roberts (5) and Iceman Parsons & Buddy Roberts (1)
  - WCWA World Six-Man Tag Team Championship (1 time) – with Michael Hayes & Buddy Roberts (Note: The Freebirds' 5th reign carried over after the title's name was changed to the WCWA World Six-Man Tag Team Championship since they were the champions at the time the title was renamed.)
- WWE
  - WWE Hall of Fame (Class of 2016) – as a member of The Fabulous Freebirds
- Wrestling Observer Newsletter
  - Best Brawler (1986)
  - Match of the Year (1984) with Buddy Roberts and Michael Hayes vs. the Von Erichs (Kerry, Kevin, and Mike) in an Anything Goes match on July 4
  - Best Three-Man Team (1983) with Michael Hayes & Buddy Roberts
  - Tag Team of the Year (1980) with Buddy Roberts as The Fabulous Freebirds
  - Tag Team of the Year (1981) with Jimmy Snuka
  - Tag Team of the Year (1992) with Steve Williams as The Miracle Violence Connection
  - Wrestling Observer Newsletter Hall of Fame (Class of 2005) – as part of The Fabulous Freebirds

== See also ==
- List of premature professional wrestling deaths
