= Uncle Elmer =

American professional wrestler (1937–1992)

- Frazier as Uncle Elmer

Personal information
- Born: Stanley C. Frazier; August 16, 1937 Philadelphia, Mississippi, U.S.
- Died: July 1, 1992 (aged 54) Biloxi, Mississippi, U.S.

Professional wrestling career
- Ring name(s): A-Team #2; Big Tex; Congorilla; Cowboy Frazier; Ed Younger; Farmer Boy Frazier; Giant Frazier; Giant Hillbilly; Hillbilly Elmer; Kamala II; Pascagoula Plowboy; Playboy Frazier; Plowboy Frazier; Tex Frazier; The Convict; The Country Plowboy; The Giant Rebel; Tiny Frazier; Tiny the Plowboy; The Lone Ranger; Uncle Elmer; Lieutenant Frazier
- Billed height: 6 ft 10 in (208 cm)
- Billed weight: 430 lb (195 kg)
- Billed from: Pascagoula, Mississippi; Philadelphia, Mississippi
- Debut: 1960
- Retired: 1989

Stanley C. Frazier (August 16, 1937 – July 1, 1992), also known as Plowboy Frazier, was an American professional wrestler. He was primarily a regional gimmick wrestler, employed for his massive size and unique personality. He is best known as Uncle Elmer in the World Wrestling Federation from 1985 to 1986. He married Joyce Stazko on Saturday Night's Main Event II, which was a major media event at the time.

== Professional wrestling career ==
=== Southeastern United States (1960–1985) ===
At the beginning of his career, Frazier wrestled in the Gulf Coast region of the United States, especially Alabama and Florida. He used several ring names, including the "Pascagoula Plowboy". Because he was a local wrestler, he was very popular with the fans.

Frazier was discovered by Jerry Jarrett and Jerry Lawler, who brought him to wrestle in the National Wrestling Alliance's (NWA) Mid-America region and later in the Continental Wrestling Association (CWA). He used many gimmicks in Tennessee, including Giant Rebel, the Lone Ranger, Giant Hillbilly and Tiny Frazier. Despite weighing 420 pounds, he also wrestled in a loincloth as Kamala II, a "copy" of Kamala, who wrestled in Tennessee with a Ugandan headhunter gimmick.

Frazier won several championships while in Tennessee. Wrestling under his own name, he won the Mid-America version of the NWA Southern Tag Team Championship in 1971. Wrestling as Plowboy Frazier, he formed a tag team with Lawler and won the AWA Southern Tag Team Championship in 1976. He won the belts again in 1978 while teaming with Terry Sawyer.

Frazier's next title success came in Georgia Championship Wrestling. While there, he teamed with Ted DiBiase to win the NWA National Tag Team Championship from the Fabulous Freebirds. Their title reign lasted five days, as they dropped the titles back to the Freebirds.

=== World Wrestling Federation (1985–1986) ===
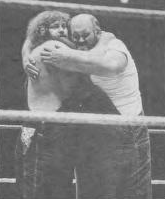
Frazier (right) and Hillbilly Jim embracing, April 1986

In 1985 and 1986, Frazier wrestled for the World Wrestling Federation as Uncle Elmer. He was a member of a stable named the Hillbillies, which also included Hillbilly Jim, Cousin Junior, and Cousin Luke. The Hillbillies' gimmick was that of simple-minded country folk who performed square dances in the ring, with Uncle Elmer perpetually eating from an enormous bucket labeled "Uncle Elmer's Fried Pig Parts". They feuded with several of the WWF's top wrestlers, including Roddy Piper and Bob Orton Jr.

On the October 5, 1985, episode of Saturday Night's Main Event II (taped two days earlier), Frazier was legitimately married to Joyce Stazko despite a storyline that saw Piper try to interfere. During the ceremony, wrestler Jesse "The Body" Ventura heckled Frazier from his position at the announcers table. Ventura later read a poem at the reception criticizing the wedding until Hillbilly Jim attacked him.

The evening's events led to a feud between Elmer and Ventura. Years later, Ventura claimed in a radio interview that to further the storyline, Vince McMahon told him to "bury them" during the ceremony. Uncle Elmer competed at the Los Angeles part of WrestleMania 2 in 1986, where he lost to "Adorable" Adrian Adonis. He remained in the WWF until May 1986, leaving the company after a quick loss to King Kong Bundy at Saturday Night's Main Event VI.

=== Later career (1986–1989) ===
Frazier continued to wrestle in Tennessee after leaving the WWF. As Giant Hillbilly Elmer, he teamed up with Lawler again to win the AWA Southern Tag Team Championship once more on June 23, 1986. Their title reign lasted less than a month, but he then regained the championship while teaming with Cousin Junior. This reign was even shorter, as they lost the title belts two days later.

Frazier then wrestled for the Continental Wrestling Association (CWA), where he found success in the super heavyweight division. He won the CWA Super Heavyweight Championship on November 17, 1986 by defeating Goliath. He dropped the belt to Jerry Blackwell, but was awarded the title again in 1988. He held the championship until the promotion abandoned it later that year.

He wrestled his last matches in 1989 and for a period of time, had his own promotion, and was involved in training future star Hardcore Holly.

== Personal life ==
Frazier was born on August 16, 1937, and lived in Pascagoula, Mississippi. He was married to his wife Joyce from 1985 until his death. She traveled with him as he wrestled. To earn additional money, Frazier was known for selling replica Rolex watches and other inexpensive merchandise, and he operated a shoe store. He also made an appearance as himself on an Andy Kaufman special on PBS in 1983, drinking raw eggs.

Frazier suffered from diabetes and poor health as a result of his weight. These problems led to kidney failure, from which he died on July 1, 1992. Frazier was buried in Biloxi, Mississippi.

== Championships and accomplishments ==
- Georgia Championship Wrestling
  - NWA National Tag Team Championship (1 time) – with Ted DiBiase
- NWA Mid-America / Continental Wrestling Association
  - NWA World Tag Team Championship (Mid-America version) (1 time) – with Dennis Hall
  - AWA Southern Tag Team Championship (4 times) – with Terry Sawyer (1), Jerry Lawler (2), and Cousin Junior (1)
  - CWA Super Heavyweight Championship (2 times)
- Wrestling Observer Newsletter
  - Worst Tag Team (1985) with Cousin Junior
  - Worst Wrestler (1985)
