= Jeff Bearden =

American professional wrestler

Personal information
- Born: Jeffrey Bearden; June 10, 1963 Amarillo, Texas, United States

Professional wrestling career
- Ring name(s): Giant Warrior; Colossus the Gladiator; Big Tiger Steele; Butch Masters; Gigante Warrior
- Billed height: 7 ft 0 in (2.13 m)
- Billed weight: 360 lb (160 kg)
- Trained by: Dick Murdoch; Dory Funk, Jr
- Debut: April 4, 1987
- Retired: 2017

Jeffrey Bearden (June 10, 1963) is an American professional wrestler, better known by his ring names Giant Warrior, Colossus the Gladiator, Big Tiger Steele, and Butch Masters. He wrestled around the world, with major stints in South Africa, Puerto Rico, Mexico, Germany, and England. He also wrestled in southern states and territories that included: Texas, Florida, Alabama, Global Wrestling Federation, and Heart of America Sports Attractions.

== Professional Wrestling Career ==
=== Early Career (1987–1988) ===
Bearden was born in Waco, Texas and raised in Amarillo, Texas. He played basketball at McMurray University and earned All-Conference honors. Bearden played professional basketball in Leuven, Belgium before going into wrestling. He was trained by Texan wrestlers Dory Funk, Jr. and Dick Murdoch. He made his wrestling debut on April 4, 1987 for Jim Crockett`s Mid-Atlantic Championship Wrestling in Macon, Georgia, where he defeated Ricky Lee Jones.

=== International promotions (1988–1993) ===
In 1988, Bearden wrestled for Consejo Mundial de Lucha Libre as Butch Masters until he was injured that December with a compound fracture of his left forearm. He did not wrestle for months.

Bearden went to Puerto Rico for Carlos Colon's World Wrestling Council in 1990. It was there that the Giant Warrior gimmick was born.

Also in 1990, he went to Japan as Butch Masters, teaming up with Tyler Mane as The Land of Giants for All Japan Pro Wrestling. They feuded with Steve Williams, Terry Gordy, Abdullah the Butcher, and André the Giant. They left AJPW in 1991.

In April 1991, he went to Mexico to wrestle for Universal Wrestling Association as Gigante Warrior. He teamed up with Brazo de Plata, Miguel Pérez Jr., Bad News Brown, and Kokina Maximus (later known as Yokozuna). Then, he feuded with Canek and Dos Caras.

In 1993, he returned to All Japan Pro Wrestling as a solo wrestler.

In 1993, he feuded with the Barbarian in India for Indo-Asian Wrestling. He defeated Barbarian for the IWA Heavyweight title on December 12 in Bombay in front of a crowd of 75,000 people, the biggest in Indian wrestling history.

=== South Africa, and various promotions (1994–1998) ===
In 1994, Bearden made his debut in South Africa for All-Star Wrestling. He feuded with Lance Von Erich, Gama Singh, Danie Voges, and Danie Brits. He held the CWA world heavyweight title in South Africa, the first time for two years, and the second time for one year.

=== International, various gimmicks and Independent promotions (1999–2017) ===
In 1999, he began using the name Big Tiger Steele in Germany for Catch Wrestling Association. He has wrestled in England, Belgium, the Middle East, Guatemala, Panama, Mexico's Lucha Libre AAA Worldwide, and Germany's Athletik Club Wrestling.

In 2002, he began using the Colossus the Gladiator gimmick for PCW in Dallas, Texas and other independent promotions in Texas. He held the television title for PCW.

Between 2010 and 2017, he continued to wrestle in South Africa, Mexico, Germany, and Belgium, as well as in Las Vegas.

In 2017, he wrestled his last match in Bremen, Germany, tagging with Salvatore Bellomo against Franz Schumann and Dave Taylor.

Jeff Bearden has held five world heavyweight titles during his 30-year career. Often wrestling as a bad guy, Bearden has been stabbed by spectators five times throughout his career.

== Personal life ==
In 2015, Bearden was inducted into the Southern Wrestling Hall of Fame by Mike Foxx.

That same year, he became a life and happiness coach and talks to schools about teen issues.

In 2010, he married his wife, Brittany Bearden. They live in Palm Bay, Florida.

== Awards and accomplishments ==
- Southern Wrestling Hall of Fame
  - Inductee (2015)
