= CWA Super Heavyweight Championship =

Professional wrestling championship

Details
- Promotion: Continental Wrestling Association / Championship Wrestling Association
- Date established: November 1986
- Date retired: July 1988
Statistics
- First champion: Goliath
- Final champion: Giant Hillbilly
- Most reigns: Giant Hillbilly (2 reigns)
- Heaviest champion: Jerry Blackwell (474 lb (215 kg))
- Lightest champion: Goliath (297 lb (135 kg))

The CWA Super Heavyweight Championship was a short-lived professional wrestling title defended in the Continental Wrestling Association, reserved for very large, "super heavyweight" wrestlers.

== Title history ==
Key
No.	Overall reign number
Reign	Reign number for the specific champion
Days	Number of days held

No.	Champion	Championship change			Reign statistics		Notes	Ref.
No.	Champion	Date	Event	Location	Reign	Days	Notes	Ref.
1	Goliath	November 1986	N/A	N/A	1	(Note: The championship history is not specific enough to determine the length of the reign, it lasted between 1 and 17 days.)	Awarded the championship, was supposed to have defeated Abdullah the Butcher, but no such match took place	
2	Giant Hillbilly	November 17, 1986	House show	Memphis, Tennessee	1	(Note: The championship history is not specific enough to determine the length of the reign, it lasted between 1 and 56 days.)		
—		N/A	—	—				
3	Jerry Blackwell	January 12, 1987	House show	Memphis, Tennessee	1	(Note: The championship history is not specific enough to determine the length of the reign, it lasted between 1 and 505 days.)	Defeated Goliath to win the championship.	
—		N/A	—	—				
4	Giant Hillbilly	May 1988	House show	N/A	2	(Note: The championship history is not specific enough to determine the length of the reign, it lasted between 1 and 426 days.)	Awarded the title.	
—	Deactivated	July 1988	—	—	—	—		
