= Krusher Kong =

American professional wrestler

Personal information
- Born: Scott Thompson; April 16, 1971 (age 55) Dallas, Texas, United States

Professional wrestling career
- Ring name(s): Texas Terminator Hoss; Khrusher Kong; Bruiser Kong; King Kong; Meat; Big Hoss McAllister
- Billed height: 6 ft 5 in (1.96 m)
- Billed weight: 453 lb (205 kg; 32.4 st)
- Billed from: South Africa (as Krusher Kong)
- Debut: 1989
- Retired: 2010

Achievements and titles

Scott Thompson (born April 16, 1971) is an American professional wrestler. He is best known for his appearances with the professional wrestling promotion World Championship Wrestling under the ring name King Kong in the early 1990s and later worked as Krusher Kong on the wrestling independent circuit. Thompson teamed up with another wrestler, Dwain McCullough, known as Awesome Kong to form a regular tag team known as The Colossal Kongs.

There is a lot of confusion regarding the career of Krusher Kong (Thompson) and Awesome Kong (McCullough) due to the fact that McCullough wrestled as "King Kong" prior to Thompson's career, including a run in WWC as TV Champion.

== Professional wrestling career ==
Thompson was discovered by manager Gary Hart while attending a local wrestling show in the Dallas-Fort Worth area. Under the name Big Hoss McAllister (not to be confused with an indie wrestler in the New Jersey area with the same name), Thompson competed on local indie shows. Thompson soon began working for the Memphis, Tennessee-based United States Wrestling Association (USWA). In the USWA he was known as "Meat" teamed up with a wrestler known as "Potatoes" to form a team called "The Fat Boys". At USWA's Night of Champions, the duo defeated Tony Falk and Jim Steele in the lone highlight for the team.

While in the USWA Thompson became friends with a wrestler known as "The Awesome Kong" and the two decided to form a tag team. Being similar in stature to Awesome Kong, Thompson began to wrestle wearing a black wrestling mask as well as growing his beard out as he wrestled as "King Kong", collectively King Kong and Awesome Kong were known as "The Colossal Kongs". In mid-1993 the Kongs worked for Big D Pro Wrestling (BDPW) as well as the Dallas, Texas-based Global Wrestling Federation (GWF). During their tenure in the GWF they were involved in a storyline against the then reigning GWF Tag Team Champion The Ebony Experience (Booker T and Stevie Ray), but never won the championship. However, the team competed against top wrestlers such as Koko Ware, Jeep Swenson, Tom Zenk, Johnny Gunn, Reggie B. Fine, Steve Simpson, The Angel of Death, and Rod Price, not to mention notable tag teams such as John Hawk & Bobby Duncum, Jr., The Blackbirds ("Iceman" King Parsons & Action Jackson), and "Gentleman" Chris Adams & Terry Simms. In the same year, the team signed with World Championship Wrestling (WCW). In WCW they were managed by Harley Race, the duo competed in WCW's tag team division. Their first real match on a national level took place as Clash of the Champions XXIV where the team lost to Sting and Ric Flair. Later on both of the Colossal Kong's competed in the 1993 Battlebowl tournament part of the WCW Pay Per View (PPV) of the same name. In the tournament King Kong teamed up with Dustin Rhodes to defeat Awesome Kong and The Equalizer, with the storyline being that the teams were "randomly drawn" to face off. Winning the match meant that King Kong was one of 20 wrestlers competing in a battle royal at the end of the night, won by Big Van Vader. King Kong would also work WCW's 1993 Starrcade show, losing to The Shockmaster in a singles match. The PPV loss was one of Thompson's last matches for WCW, after which he returned to the independent circuit in Texas, most notably for World Class II, NWA Dallas, NWA-Southwest, Professional Championship Wrestling, Legacy Wrestling Enterprises, and Texas Championship Wrestling (later named Xtreme Championship Wrestling).

At this point he had tweaked his ring name outside of WCW to "Krusher Kong" instead of the more generic "King Kong". He competed for NWA-Southwest in a stable with "Iceman" King Parsons and "The Idolmaker" Lance Romance. Thompson won a tournament to become the NWA Brass Knuckles Champion, by defeated Action Jackson (Perry Jackson). He would surrender the belt for inactivity, though his former partner, Awesome Kong, would return to battle for the vacant title (and lose to Eclipse). In 2001, Thompson would win a tournament to become the first Professional Championship Wrestling Heavyweight Champion by defeated All Japan Pro Wrestling veteran, The Cedman. He would later hold the Heavyweight and Tag Team titles for Texas Championship Wrestling / Xtreme Championship Wrestling. In 2002, he battled "Hacksaw" Jim Duggan at Legacy Wrestling Enterprises' "Explosion" show in Fort Worth, TX, in a losing effort. Some of his notable opponents during his final indie run after WCW included "Gentleman" Chris Adams, Redd Dogg (Rodney Mack), Shadow (Lance Archer), Khris Germany, Kit Carson, "Maniac" Mike Davis, The Necro Butcher, Luminous, Scott Putski, Black Bart, and Chico Torres.

His last match was 2010.

His signature move was the Kongpactor (Vader Bomb).

== Championships and accomplishments ==
- Professional Championship Wrestling
  - PCW Heavyweight Championship (1 time)
- Pro Wrestling Illustrated
  - PWI ranked King Kong # 236 of the 500 best singles wrestlers of the PWI 500 in 1993
- Texas Championship Wrestling / Xtreme Championship Wrestling
  - TCW / XCW Heavyweight Championship (2 time)
  - XCW Tag Team Championship (1 time) - with Bull (300-lb. Manimal)
- Texas Wrestling Hall of Fame
  - Class of 2012
- Wrestling Observer Newsletter
  - Worst Tag Team (1993) with Awesome Kong
