= Jerry Blackwell =

American professional wrestler (1949-1995)

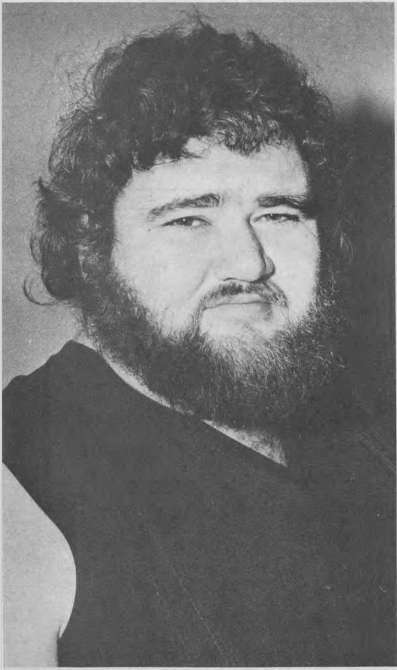
- Blackwell, 1982

Personal information
- Born: April 26, 1949 Hall County, Georgia, U.S.
- Died: January 22, 1995 (aged 45) Atlanta, Georgia, U.S.

Professional wrestling career
- Ring name(s): Bruiser Blackwell; Crusher Blackwell; Jerry Blackwell; Man Mountain Blackwell; Sheik Ayatollah Blackwell; The Canadian Bumblebee; Mr. Big
- Billed height: 5 ft 9 in (1.75 m)
- Billed weight: 473 lb (215 kg)
- Billed from: Stone Mountain, Georgia
- Trained by: Gino Brito
- Debut: October 1974
- Retired: 1990

Jerry Blackwell Jr. (April 26, 1949 – January 22, 1995), better known by his ring name "Crusher" Jerry Blackwell, was an American professional wrestler. He was best known for his tenure in the American Wrestling Association (AWA) from 1979 to 1989.

He began his career in 1974 and wrestled for several National Wrestling Alliance (NWA) territories over the next few years, winning the NWA World Tag Team Championship (Central States version) with Buck Robley in 1977 and the NWA Southeastern Tag Team Championship twice in 1979, first with The Invader and then with Dick Slater. He also wrestled for the World Wide Wrestling Federation (WWWF) from 1975 to 1978.

Blackwell joined the AWA in 1979, where he won the AWA World Tag Team Championship with Ken Patera in 1983. He was a main event star in the promotion and feuded with the likes of The Crusher, Bruiser Brody and Sheik Adnan Al-Kaissey. He also worked for All Japan Pro Wrestling (AJPW) and served as the promoter for Southern Championship Wrestling (SCW).

== Professional wrestling career ==
=== Early career (1974–1979) ===
Blackwell became interested in becoming a professional wrestler after his grandfather took him to a show at the St. Paul Civic Center. He began his career in October 1974 under the ring name Man Mountain Blackwell, using a hillbilly gimmick.

In 1975, he competed for NWA Big Time Wrestling as Bruiser Blackwell. He enjoyed great success in the Central United States as part of Col. Buck Robley's "army", winning the NWA World Tag Team Championship (Central States version) with him in 1977.

In early 1979, Blackwell teamed with The Invader to win the NWA Southeastern Tag Team Championship. On May 24, he won the title again with Dick Slater, defeating Bob Orton Jr. (formerly The Invader) and Bob Roop. He also wrestled under a mask in Knoxville, Tennessee as The Canadian Bumblebee with Boris Malenko as his manager.

=== World Wide Wrestling Federation (1975–1978) ===
On September 30, 1975, he made his debut for the World Wide Wrestling Federation (WWWF) as Crusher Blackwell. The following month, he made his televised debut with Freddie Blassie as his manager. One of his first storylines was with Gino Brito, who was asked to teach Blackwell. During his stint, he received several matches for the WWWF Championship against champion Bob Backlund.

Blackwell considered joining the now-WWF during the promotion's expansion in 1984. Before being signed, wrestlers were required to record promos, but the large number of wrestlers wanting to join the WWF made for a long lineup on a day while the interviews were being recorded. Blackwell got so frustrated with standing in line that he left, claiming that he was a wrestler and did not want to feel like he was punching a time clock for a corporation.

=== American Wrestling Association (1979–1989) ===
Blackwell made his debut for the Minneapolis, Minnesota-based American Wrestling Association (AWA) on December 25, 1979, as Farmer Blackwell. He began calling himself the "Crusher" of the area, leading to a bloody feud with the "Crusher" Reginald Lisowski over the moniker. During the feud, Blackwell forced Lisowski out of action for a year after performing a move from the top rope and landing awkwardly on him. He was also a top contender for the AWA World Heavyweight Championship, which was held by Verne Gagne.

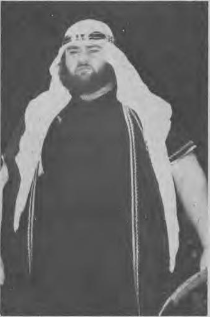
Blackwell as "Sheik Ayatollah Blackwell", 1982

In early 1982, manager Sheik Adnan Al-Kaissey would "buy off" Blackwell to form a tag team with him. As part of their alignment, Blackwell changed his ring name to Sheik Ayatollah Blackwell and wore Arab garments, feuding with the High Flyers (Greg Gagne and "Jumpin" Jim Brunzell) over the AWA World Tag Team Championship. On April 15, 1983, he defeated Kerry Von Erich to win the NWA Missouri Heavyweight Championship, which he lost on May 13 to Harley Race.

Due to injuries, Al-Kaissey was replaced by Ken Patera as Blackwell's partner. Known as The Sheiks, they defeated the High Flyers on June 26 to win the AWA World Tag Team Championship. They remained champions for eleven months, accumulating 42 successful defenses across the AWA, Continental Wrestling Association (CWA) and International Wrestling, before losing the titles on May 6, 1984, to the Crusher and Baron von Raschke.

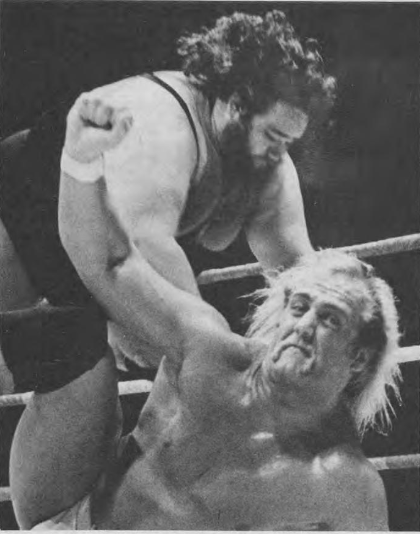
Blackwell facing Hulk Hogan, 1982

On June 10, immediately after winning a battle royal, Blackwell was attacked by Al-Kaissey, Abdullah the Butcher and his tag team partner in Japan, Bruiser Brody, which led to a post-match brawl also involving Dusty Rhodes, Curt Hennig and the Fabulous Ones (Steve Keirn and Stan Lane) coming in on Blackwell's behalf. As a result, Blackwell was positioned as one of the AWA's top babyfaces in light of Hulk Hogan's departure from the promotion. He began a critically acclaimed feud with Brody that lasted for several years.

On November 16, Blackwell won his second NWA Missouri Heavyweight Championship by defeating Race, but lost it back to Race on August 2, 1985. Blackwell's last major feud in the AWA was against the Fabulous Freebirds, particularly against the stable's leader, Michael Hayes.

Due to poor health caused by years of obesity, Blackwell's in-ring performance slowed, and he stopped wrestling full-time by 1988. He made his final AWA appearance during a television taping in Rochester on November 18, 1989, defeating Tom Stone in a singles match and then teaming with Bobby Fulton and Jackie Fulton to defeat Johnny Valiant and The Destruction Crew (Mike Enos and Wayne Bloom) in a six-man tag team match.

=== All Japan Pro Wrestling (1977–1988) ===
Through the AWA's working relationship with All Japan Pro Wrestling (AJPW), Blackwell made several appearances for the Japanese promotion starting in 1977. He challenged Jumbo Tsuruta for the NWA United National Championship on October 22, 1979, in a losing effort. On September 3, 1984, Blackwell and Bruiser Brody lost to Tsuruta and Genichiro Tenryu in a match for the vacant NWA International Tag Team Championship. In November 1988, he and Phil Hickerson took part in the Real World Tag League, but failed to win as they scored no points.

=== Later career (1987–1990) ===
Blackwell won his final championship on January 12, 1987, defeating Goliath for the CWA Super Heavyweight Championship. That same year, he began wrestling on the Georgia independent circuit as Mr. Big. He also served as the promoter for Southern Championship Wrestling (SCW) until ending his career in 1990, with the promotion going defunct that same year.

== Professional wrestling style ==
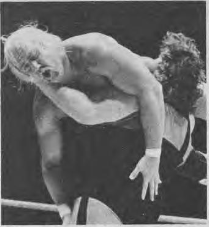
Blackwell carrying Hulk Hogan

Blackwell was nicknamed the "Mountain from Stone Mountain". Despite his considerable bulk, he was quite nimble and a gifted worker, able to throw a standing dropkick and take bumps in the ring. His finishing maneuver was a big splash. According to the Wrestling Observer Newsletter, during his prime he was "generally considered the best worker of any 400-pound plus wrestler in history before modern era wrestlers like Bam Bam Bigelow and Vader came along."

Blackwell was also known for his feats of strength; one of the most famous, which he performed during interviews, was diving into a 2x4 with his head. While generally regarded as an easy wrestler to work with, he was involved in at least two matches in which his opponent was seriously injured. Mad Dog Vachon sustained three broken ribs and two broken vertebrae in a match with Blackwell and was unable to compete again for almost three years. The Crusher suffered nerve damage to his arm and was forced to take about a year off after Blackwell performed a move from the top rope and landed awkwardly on him.

== Other media ==
Blackwell competed in the 1979 World's Strongest Man contest, but withdrew early in the competition due to an injury. Ken Patera had jokingly suggested that Blackwell should enter the contest.

== Personal life ==
Jerry Blackwell Jr. was born on April 26, 1949, in Hall County, Georgia. His parents died when he was six years old, forcing him to live with his grandfather, Clyde. Before becoming a professional wrestler, he worked as a security guard, as well as at a grocery store, poultry plants, and a Mr. Pizza restaurant. In 1986, Blackwell suffered a bruised kidney and spent nine days in intensive care due to an infection and double pneumonia.

In later years, Blackwell suffered from health problems including diabetes, gangrene, and gout. He went through a divorce after the death of his son and returned to working as a security guard when a business failed. He was bedridden for much of 1994 and was involved in several automobile accidents. On January 22, 1995, Blackwell died at the Crawford W. Long Memorial Hospital in Atlanta from complications from pneumonia and injuries sustained from a December automobile accident. He was 45 years old.

== Championships and accomplishments ==
- American Wrestling Association
  - AWA World Tag Team Championship (1 time) – with Ken Patera
- Central States Wrestling
  - NWA World Tag Team Championship (Central States version) (1 time) – with Buck Robley
- Continental Wrestling Association
  - CWA Super Heavyweight Championship (1 time)
- Southeastern Championship Wrestling
  - NWA Southeastern Tag Team Championship (2 times) – with The Invader (1), Dick Slater (1)
- St. Louis Wrestling Club
  - NWA Missouri Heavyweight Championship (2 times)
- St. Louis Wrestling Hall of Fame
  - Class of 2025
- Pro Wrestling Illustrated
  - PWI ranked him #116 of the 500 best singles wrestlers during the "PWI Years" in 2003
  - PWI ranked him #75 of the 100 best tag teams during the "PWI Years" – with Ken Patera in 2003

== See also ==
- List of premature professional wrestling deaths
