= Bill Irwin (wrestler) =

American professional wrestler (born 1954)

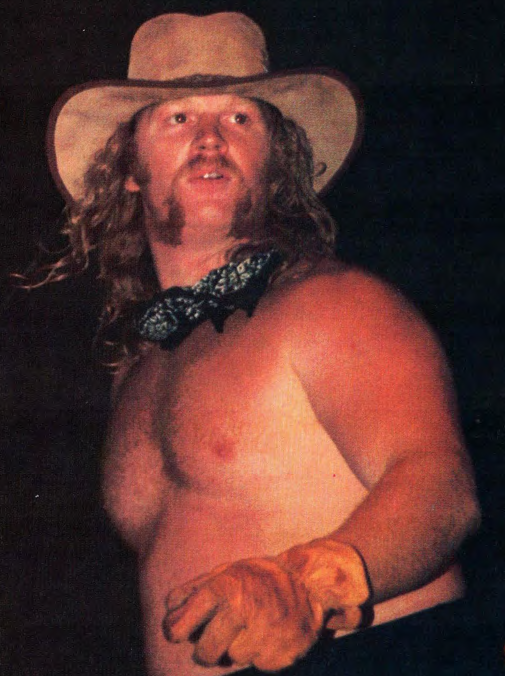
- Irwin in 1983

Personal information
- Born: Barney William Irwin; September 17, 1954 (age 72) Pecos, Texas, U.S.
- Family: Scott Irwin (brother)

Professional wrestling career
- Ring name(s): Bill Irwin; The Black Scorpion; The Goon; Super Destroyer No. 1
- Billed height: 6 ft 1 in (185 cm)
- Billed weight: 250 lb (113 kg)
- Billed from: Pecos, Texas (as Bill Irwin); Duluth, Minnesota (as The Goon)
- Trained by: Scott Irwin; Larry Sharpe
- Debut: 1977
- Retired: 2014

Barney William Irwin (born September 17, 1954) is an American retired professional wrestler, better known by his ring name, "Wild" Bill Irwin. Irwin is also known for his appearances with the World Wrestling Federation as The Goon in 1996 to 1997. He is the brother of the late Scott Irwin.

== Professional wrestling career ==
=== Mid South beginning of The Super Destroyers/The Long Riders (1977–1987) ===
Trained by his brother Scott Irwin & Verne Gagne (who he claims to have not been part of his official training), Bill Irwin began wrestling in 1979 in the National Wrestling Alliance's Central States territory and in Mid South Wrestling and World Class Championship Wrestling, winning the NWA Central States Tag Team Championship in 1979. He wrestled for a short period in MSW in 1982, teaming with his brother Scott as the masked tag team The "Super Destroyers", who were managed by Skandor Akbar. The team would later become known as The Long Riders, in NSW. Irwin then moved on to Jim Crockett Promotions and the American Wrestling Association where he and his brother wrestled as the "Long Riders" and won several tag team titles together. Their tag team ended prematurely when Scott died from a brain tumor in 1987.

=== World Class Championship Wrestling (1981–1984, 1987–1989) ===
Working in both the Mid South and also the WCCW in 1981, Irwin would leave the Mid South in 1982 for WCCW, and now going by the name Wild Bill Irwin, he won the NWA Texas Heavyweight Championship off Al Madril and then having become a member of H & H Ltd tagging with Bugsy McGraw to win the NWA World Tag Team Championship (Texas version) then vacate the NWA Texas Heavyweight belt owing to a match between him and David Von Erich by 1983s after blaming McGraw for losing them the tag belts, then, after a light feud, began teaming with King Kong Bundy becoming North American Tag Team Championship which he would do another 4 times with his brother Bill as the original tag team named The Super Destroyers (not the later ECW version) and their last run was as The Long Riders. That same year, he won the WCCW Television Championship to complete his total of 7 times.

He made a late return in 1983 to WCCW as Super Destroyer No. 2 with his brother Scott, once again managed by Skandor Akbar, being the recent NWA North American Tag Team Champions for the first time. After the death of his brother Scott in 1987 caused by a brain tumor, he returned to World Class, working until the company folded in 1989. He briefly worked for the Wild West promotion in Dallas while he ran a wrestling school. Irwin later provided extensive commentary on the WWE's "The Triumph and Tragedy of WCCW" video retrospective of World Class Championship Wrestling, regarding his time in Texas, what it was like to wrestle in the Dallas Sportatorium, and his fateful trip with David Von Erich to Japan.

=== World Championship Wrestling (1989–1991, 1993) ===
Irwin, as "Wild" Bill Irwin, would also appear in World Championship Wrestling. He made his initial appearance on May 27, 1989 at a house show in Baltimore, MD, falling to Dick Murdoch. A day later on The Main Event he made his televised debut, pinning Rick Conners. Irwin was active throughout the summer but rarely successful, falling to Dick Murdoch, Brian Pillman and Ricky Steamboat in house show encounters. On June 14, 1989 he challenged WCW Television Champion Sting at Clash of the Champions VII, but was defeated. On July 16, 1989 Irwin was defeated by Scott Hall on The Main Event, and on the July 29th edition of WCW Pro was pinned by Steve Williams. Irwin continued to compete throughout the summer, but usually fell in defeat. On the September 23, 1989 edition of WCW Worldwide Irwin challenged WCW World Heavyweight Champion Ric Flair but was defeated. As the fall commenced he engaged in a losing house show effort against new arrival Tom Zenk, and concluded the year with a defeat to Zenk in Chicago, IL in December.

Irwin would then depart WCW, not returning until the Clash of the Champions XII on September 5, 1990 in Asheville, NC. Facing Tommy Rich, Irwin fell in defeat. He gained his first win of his comeback four days later in Fort Worth, TX, defeating Dave Sierra in a house show. Irwin would occasionally wrestle under a mask as The Black Scorpion, an angle that saw a variety of masked wrestlers (also including Dave Shelton) face WCW World Champion Sting during the fall of 1990. Wrestling as the Scorpion, Irwin would face Sting in numerous house show matches. Wrestling without the mask, Irwin made his PPV debut at Halloween Havoc 90, losing to Terry Taylor. He concluded the year by defeating TC Carter in a dark match at the Starrcade 90 PPV.

Irwin opened 1991 with a house show defeat at the hands of The Junkyard Dog on January 1 in Corpus Christi. After facing Brad Armstrong and Terry Taylor in house show matches he concluded his second WCW run with a match against Tim Horner on January 31, 1991 in Norfolk, VA.

He would return just over two years later on February 21, 1993, facing Davey Boy Smith in Smith's WCW debut at SuperBrawl III.

=== Various promotions (1991–1996) ===
Irwin would eventually go on to form a new tag team with Black Bart in the Global Wrestling Federation from 1991 to 1992. He also worked in Japan for Network of Wrestling in 1993 and 1994.

=== World Wrestling Federation (1996–1997) ===
In 1996, Irwin began appearing regularly with the World Wrestling Federation as "The Goon", a hockey character who was "kicked out of every league he ever participated in." He was one of a series of "jobbers with gimmicks" brought into the WWF in 1996 to help elevate the company's stars, alongside Alex "The Pug" Pourteau, Freddie Joe Floyd, Salvatore Sincere, and T. L. Hopper. He made his TV debut on the July 20, 1996 episode of WWF Superstars of Wrestling, defeating Dan Jesser. During his short tenure, he faced various wrestlers such as Marc Mero, Flash Funk, Barry Windham, Jake Roberts, and The Undertaker. His gimmick did not last long, as he left the company a few months after arriving, in March 1997.

=== Late career (1997–2014) ===
Upon leaving the WWF, Irwin wrestled on the independent circuit. A year later after leaving WWF, he returned in 1998 for two appearances teaming with Kit Carson as they were defeated by D'Lo Brown and Mark Henry on WWF Shotgun Saturday Night on February 16. He was also defeated by Tiger Ali Singh on June 16 in a dark match for Shotgun. In 2001, Irwin returned to the WWF for one night, resuming the gimmick of "The Goon" for the gimmick battle royal at WrestleMania X-Seven, which was ultimately won by The Iron Sheik. On Raw XV, the 15th-anniversary WWE Raw special on December 10, 2007, Irwin, wrestling as "The Goon" once again, and sporting a thick moustache, participated in the 15th Anniversary Battle Royal. He was eliminated by the Repo Man, and Ted DiBiase went on to win the royal. He retired in 2014.

== Championships and accomplishments ==
- All Japan Pro Wrestling
  - World's Strongest Tag Determination League Fighting Spirit Award (1989) - with Terry Gordy
- Big D Wrestling
  - Big D Heavyweight Championship (2 times)
  - Big D Brass Knuckles Championship (1 time)
  - Big D Tag Team Championship (1 time) - with Mr. Mister
- Central States Wrestling
  - NWA Central States Tag Team Championship (1 time) - with Bryan St. John
- Continental Wrestling Association
  - AWA Southern Heavyweight Championship (1 time)
  - AWA Southern Tag Team Championship (1 time) - with Larry Latham
- Georgia Championship Wrestling
  - NWA National Tag Team Championship (1 time) - with Scott Irwin
- Global Wrestling Federation
  - GWF Brass Knuckles Championship (1 time)
  - GWF Tag Team Championship (1 time) - with Black Bart
- Lutte Internationale
  - Canadian International Tag Team Championship (1 time) - with Scott Irwin
- NWA Big Time Wrestling / World Class Championship Wrestling
  - NWA American Tag Team Championship (5 times) - with King Kong Bundy (1) and The Super Destroyer #2 (4)
  - NWA Texas Heavyweight Championship (1 time)
  - NWA World Tag Team Championship (Texas version) (2 times) - with Frank Dusek (1) and Bugsy McGraw (1)
  - WCCW Television Championship (7 times)
- Pro Wrestling Illustrated
  - PWI ranked him # 311 of the 500 best singles wrestlers during the PWI Years in 2003.
- Steel Domain Wrestling
  - SDW Television Championship (1 time)
- Universal Wrestling Federation
  - UWF World Tag Team Championship (1 time) - with Leroy Brown
