= GWF Brass Knuckles Championship =

Professional wrestling championship

Details
- Promotion: Global Wrestling Federation
- Date established: February 28, 1992
- Date retired: 1992
Statistics
- First champion(s): Black Bart
- Most reigns: Black Bart and Bill Irwin (1 reign)
- Longest reign: Black Bart (28 days)

The GWF Brass Knuckles Championship was a professional wrestling championship. Similar to the WWF Hardcore Championship, it was defended only in hardcore matches in the Global Wrestling Federation. The title had two holders, Black Bart and Bill Irwin but was later retired.

== Title history ==
Key
No.	Overall reign number
Reign	Reign number for the specific champion
Days	Number of days held
N/A	Unknown information
†	Championship change is unrecognized by the promotion

No.	Champion	Championship change			Reign statistics		Notes	Ref.
No.	Champion	Date	Event	Location	Reign	Days	Notes	Ref.
1	Black Bart	February 28, 1992	House show	Dallas, Texas	1	28	Won a battle royal, last eliminating Bill Irwin	
2	Bill Irwin	March 27, 1992	House show	Dallas, Texas	1	(Note: The exact date the championship was abandoned has not been determined, making Bill Irwin's reign too uncertain to calculate.)	Won a first blood match.	
—	Deactivated	1992	—	—	—	—	Title abandoned	
