= Colossal Kongs =

Tag team
- Name(s): Awesome Kong; King/Krusher Kong
- Billed heights: Awesome Kong: 6 ft 4 in (1.93 m); King Kong: 6 ft 4 in (1.93 m)
- Combined billed weight: 850 lb (390 kg)
- Debut: 1991
- Disbanded: 1999

The Colossal Kongs was a professional wrestling tag team who competed in the USWA, GWF and WCW. In WCW they were managed by Harley Race, who brought them to the promotion. The team was made up of Awesome Kong and Krusher Kong (Krusher Kong was originally billed as King Kong, but changed his name for copyright reasons).

Although they headlined the Clash of the Champions XXIV in a losing effort against Ric Flair and Sting, the team was ultimately unsuccessful and short lived. They were named the Worst Tag Team of 1993 in the Wrestling Observer Newsletter awards.

Awesome Kong (Dwayne McCullough) died from a massive heart attack on November 17, 2012 at 54.
