= UWF Heavyweight Championship =

Professional wrestling championship

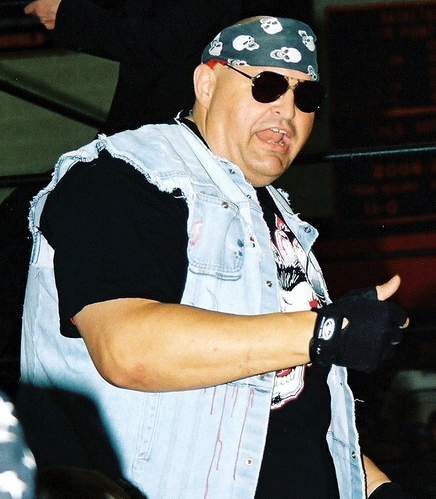
- One Man Gang (in 2012), one time champion

Details
- Promotion: Universal Wrestling Federation
- Date established: May 30, 1986
- Date retired: November 26, 1987
Statistics
- First champion(s): Terry Gordy
- Final champion(s): "Dr. Death" Steve Williams

The UWF Heavyweight Championship was the premier title in the Universal Wrestling Federation owned by Bill Watts. When Mid-South Wrestling Association changed its name to the UWF, the Mid-South North American Championship was retired and a tournament was held to crown a new UWF Heavyweight Champion. When Jim Crockett Promotions purchased the UWF, the title was defended in Crockett for a while and was then retired.

It should not be confused with the UWF Heavyweight Championship that was defended in the Universal Wrestling Federation promotion owned by Herb Abrams. That title and promotion began several years after Watts' promotion was sold.

== Title history ==
Key
No.	Overall reign number
Reign	Reign number for the specific champion
Days	Number of days held

No.	Champion	Championship change			Reign statistics		Notes	Ref.
No.	Champion	Date	Event	Location	Reign	Days	Notes	Ref.
1	Terry Gordy	May 30, 1986	House show	Houston, Texas	1	163	Defeated Jim Duggan in tournament final	
2	One Man Gang	November 9, 1986	House show	Tulsa, Oklahoma	1	161	Won by forfeit when Gordy was injured	
3	Big Bubba Rogers	April 19, 1987	House show	Muskogee, Oklahoma	1	83		
4	"Dr. Death" Steve Williams	July 11, 1987	House show	Oklahoma City, Oklahoma	1	138		
—	Deactivated	December 26, 1987	—	—	—	—		
