= NWA Texas Hardcore Championship =

Professional wrestling championship

The NWA Brass Knuckles Championship was a professional wrestling championship sanctioned by the National Wrestling Alliance. The Texas Brass Knuckles Championship was revived by the NWA in June 1998, and was renamed the NWA Texas Hardcore Championship on April 1, 1999. Finally, the title was abandoned on April 15, 2001.

== Title history ==
Key
No.	Overall reign number
Reign	Reign number for the specific champion
Days	Number of days held
N/A	Unknown information
†	Championship change is unrecognized by the promotion

No.	Champion	Championship change			Reign statistics		Notes	Ref.
No.	Champion	Date	Event	Location	Reign	Days	Notes	Ref.
NWA Brass Knuckles Championship
1	Krusher Kong	June 2, 1998	House show	Denton, Texas	1		Defeated Perry Jackson in a tournament final to win the title after it was revived by the NWA.	
2	Eclipse	August 14, 1998	House show	North Richland Hills, Texas	1		Defeated Awesome Kong to win the title.	
3	Nitetrain C. Crane	October 1998	N/A	North Richland Hills	1		Title awarded to Nitetrain C. Crane when Eclipse failed to appear for a title defense.	
4	Super T	October 9, 1998	House show	North Richland Hills	1			
5	Cedric of Hollywood	January 22, 1999	House show	North Richland Hills, Texas	1			
6	Jimmy James	February 26, 1999	House show	North Richland Hills, Texas	1		Title renamed NWA Texas Hardcore Championship on April 1, 1999.	
NWA Texas Hardcore Championship
7	Canyon	April 9, 1999	House show	North Richland Hills, Texas	1			
8	Jimmy James	June 10, 1999	House show	North Richland Hills, Texas	2			
9	The New Dr. X	October 1, 1999	House show	North Richland Hills, Texas	1			
10	Canyon	November 26, 1999	House show	North Richland Hills, Texas	2			
11	Necro Butcher	February 18, 2000	House show	North Richland Hills, Texas	1			
12	Convict 00187	March 3, 2000	House show	North Richland Hills, Texas	1			
13	Necro Butcher	April 1, 2000	House show	Blue Mound, Texas	2			
14	Abdullah the Butcher	April 14, 2000	House show	North Richland Hills, Texas	2			
—	Vacated	May 2000	—	—	—	—	Abdullah was stripped of the title for undocumented reasons	
15	Necro Butcher	May 26, 2000	House show	North Richland Hills, Texas	3		Defeated Canyon to win the vacant title.	
16	Mr. Mayhem	October 15, 2000	House show	Nashville, Tennessee	1			
17	Necro Butcher	November 24, 2000	House show	North Richland Hills, Texas	4			
18	Beast	February 23, 2001	House show	North Richland Hills, Texas	1			
19	Convict 00187	March 16, 2001	House show	North Richland Hills, Texas	2		Defeated Beast and Necro Butcher in a three-way match.	
—	Deactivated	April 15, 2001	—	—	—	—	Title abandoned when the NWA Texas hardcore division was discontinued.	

== See also ==
- List of National Wrestling Alliance championships
