= Moondog Splat =

American professional wrestler

Personal information
- Born: Robert White; December 18, 1960 (age 65) Pittsburgh, Pennsylvania, U.S.

Professional wrestling career
- Ring name(s): Moondog Splat; Goliath; Super Moondog; Giant Goliath; Bo White
- Billed height: 6 ft 8 in (2.03 m)
- Billed weight: 419 lb (190 kg)
- Debut: 1986
- Retired: 1997

Robert White (December 18, 1960) is a retired American professional wrestler better known as Moondog Splat. He was best known for his appearances in the United States Wrestling Association as a part of The Moondogs, and Goliath in Continental Wrestling Association.

== Professional wrestling career ==
White made his wrestling debut in 1986 for Continental Wrestling Association in Memphis as Goliath. He won the CWA Super Heavyweight Championship. Later he teamed with Big Bubba as the Downtown Connection being managed by Downtown Bruno winning the AWA Southern Tag Team Championship. They defeated Jeff Jarrett and Pat Tanaka for the titles. They dropped them to Rocky Johnson and Soul Train Jones.

In 1991, Goliath worked in Puerto Rico and Super World of Sports in Japan.

Then in January 1993 he became Moondog Splat to replaced Moondog Spike to team with Moondog Spot as the Moondogs. They would win the USWA Tag Team Titles four times. August 1993 saw the Moondogs meet one of their noteworthy rivals, The Dogcatchers, which played off of the Moondogs' name. The teams feuded throughout August and September 1993.

From November 1993 to March 1994, the team appeared in Smoky Mountain Wrestling, feuding again with The Harris Brothers and The Rock 'n' Roll Express. Spike and Splat also appeared in W*ING's 1993 Most Dangerous Tag War Tournament, finishing with 0 points.

In 1994, Splat split up with Spot and worked in the independents. In 1996, he returned to Japan for Tokyo Pro Wrestling. In 1997, Spalt retired from wrestling.

== Championships and accomplishments ==
- Continental Wrestling Association
  - AWA Southern Tag Team Championship (1 time) - with Big Bubba (1 time)
  - CWA Super Heavyweight Championship (1 time)
- United States Wrestling Association
  - USWA World Tag Team Championship (4 times) - with Moondog Spot (1)
