= Black Bart (wrestler) =

American professional wrestler (1948–2025)

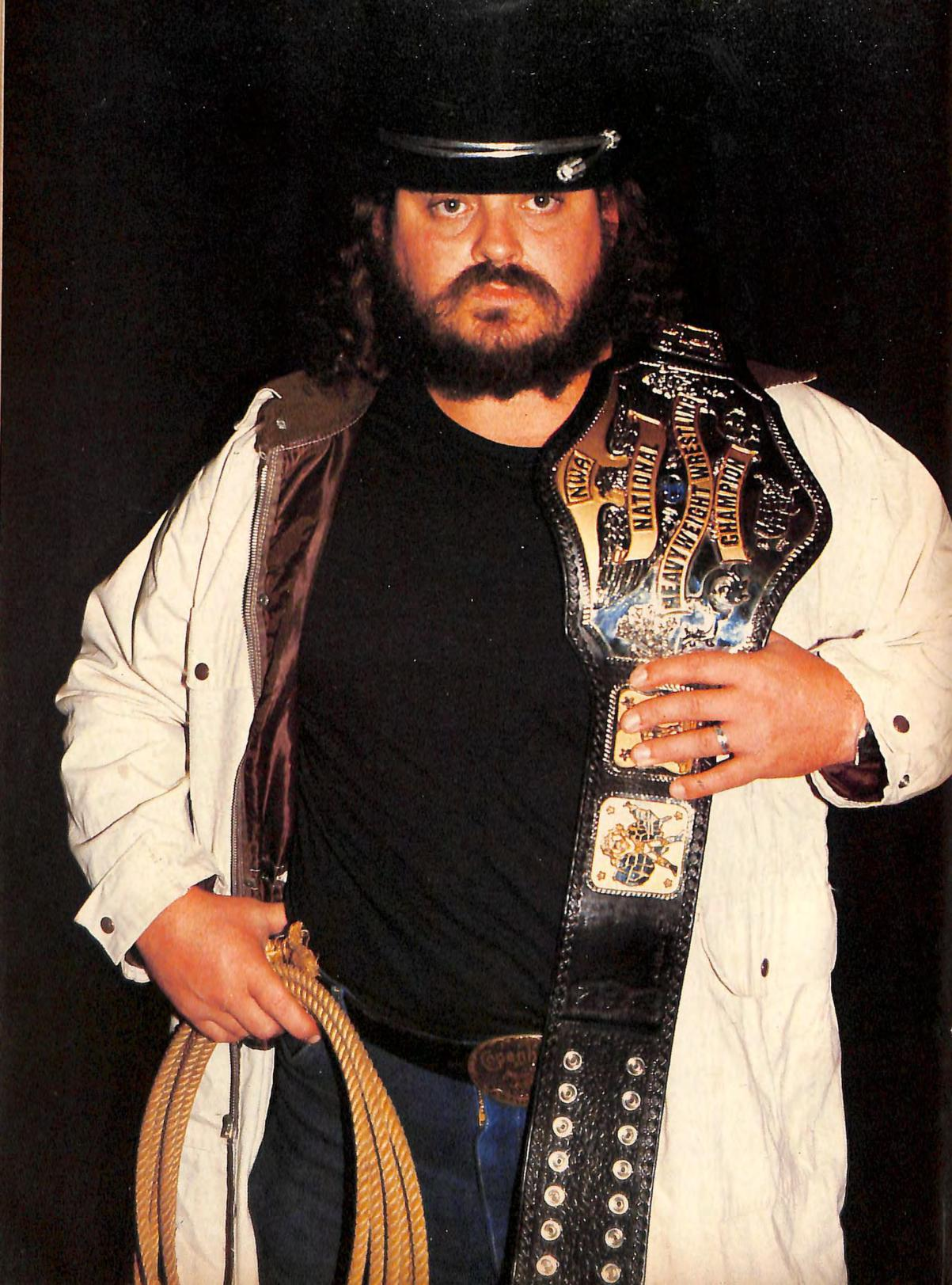
- Black Bart in 1986 as the NWA National Heavyweight Champion

Personal information
- Born: Richard Harris; January 30, 1948 Texarkana, Arkansas, U.S.
- Died: January 9, 2025 (aged 76)

Professional wrestling career
- Ring name(s): Big Train Bart; Black Bart; Black Bart Johnson; Hangman Harris; El Lobo; Man Mountain Harris; Rick Harris; Ricky Harris
- Billed height: 6 ft 4 in (193 cm)
- Billed weight: 350 lb (159 kg)
- Billed from: Pampa, Texas
- Trained by: Charlie Fulton; Gene Lewis; Genichiro Tenryu
- Debut: 1975
- Retired: 2006

Richard Harris (January 30, 1948 – January 9, 2025), better known by his ring name Black Bart, was an American professional wrestler.

== Professional wrestling career ==
=== Early career (1975–1981) ===
Harris started wrestling in 1975. He went through several names, such as "Man Mountain Harris," "Hangman Harris," and "Hangman Ricky Harris".

=== Mid-Atlantic Championship Wrestling (1981) ===
In 1981, Harris competed as a preliminary wrestler on the Jim Crockett Promotions "Mid-Atlantic Championship Wrestling" program as "Ricky Harris".

=== Georgia Championship Wrestling (1982) ===
From January to May 1982, Harris wrestled for Georgia Championship Wrestling.

=== Mid South Wrestling (1982) ===
From May to October 1982, Harris wrestled for Mid South Wrestling. It was during his "Hangman" Rick Harris phase, working for Bill Watts, that he debuted as a bounty hunter for Skandor Akbar in 1982.

=== Mid-Atlantic Championship Wrestling (1982–1983) ===
In November 1982, Harris returned to MACW. He wrestled for the promotion until May 1983.

=== Southeastern Championship Wrestling and All-Japan Pro Wrestling (1983) ===
From July to December 1983, Harris wrestled for Southeastern Championship Wrestling and All-Japan Pro Wrestling.

=== Championship Wrestling from Florida (1983–1984) ===
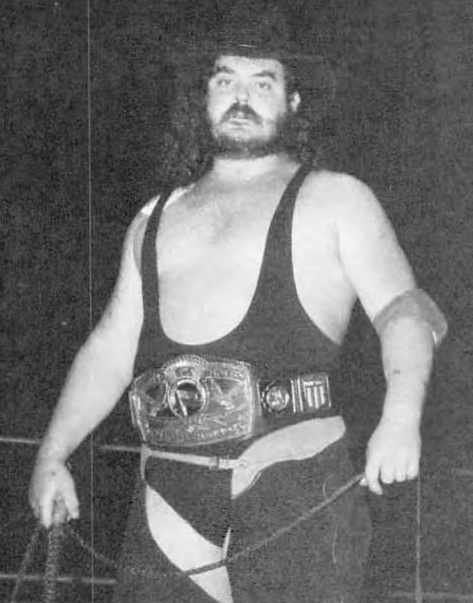
Bart as NWA United States Tag Team Champions, c. 1984

In December 1983, Harris joined Championship Wrestling from Florida. Harris formed a tag team called the "Long Riders" with Ron Bass in Florida Championship Wrestling in 1984 and they would hold the NWA United States Tag Team Titles (Florida) and work a program with Barry Windham and Mike Rotunda.

=== Mid-Atlantic Championship Wrestling (1984–1986) ===
In August 1984, Harris returned to Mid-Atlantic Championship Wrestling with Bass, where they were managed by J.J. Dillon. After splitting with Bass in 1985, Harris feuded with Ron Garvin, Terry Taylor and Sam Houston over the NWA Mid-Atlantic Championship which he won and defended. During this time Black Bart developed his second-rope leg drop to a prone opponent finishing move known as the "Texas Trash Compactor".

=== World Class Championship Wrestling (1986–1987) ===
In September 1986, Bart went to World Class Championship Wrestling where he feuded with Chris Adams and Kevin Von Erich over the World Class title. When Adams, who held the World Class title, left the promotion in September 1986, Bart was awarded the championship...but not before the promotion explained that Bart won the belt from Adams in a fictitious match held in Los Angeles. Bart lost the championship to Von Erich a month later in Dallas. In May 1987, he left WCCW to join the UWF.

=== Universal Wrestling Federation and Mid-Atlantic Championship Wrestling (1987–1988) ===
While in the Universal Wrestling Federation they would co-promote shows with the NWA. While wrestling in the NWA for Jim Crockett Promotions, he received a sizable push in the midcard, winning the NWA National Heavyweight Championship and the NWA Mid-Atlantic Heavyweight Championship. He also wrestled in the tournament for the NWA Western States Heritage Championship. Harris lost in the final match to Barry Windham.

=== World Class Championship Wrestling (1988) ===
In March 1988 Harris returned to World Class Championship Wrestling. He remained with the promotion till the end of the year.

=== Professional Wrestling Federation (1989) ===
In early 1989 Harris went back to Florida and teamed with Bobby Jaggers and Tony Anthony while feuding with Dustin Rhodes and Mike Graham and The Nasty Boys.

=== United States Wrestling Association (1989) ===
In May 1989 Black Bart went to Memphis and feuded with Jerry Lawler & Jeff Jarrett.

=== World Wrestling Federation (1990–1991) ===
On January 22, 1990, Black Bart made his debut for the World Wrestling Federation when he defeated Lee Peak in a dark match at a WWF Superstars of Wrestling taping in Miami, Florida. Four weeks later Bart made his first appearance on television, when he was defeated by Tito Santana on Prime Time Wrestling on February 19. For the remainder of the year he worked mostly as enhancement talent. Bart appeared in well over one hundred matches and was featured regularly on television. He did, however, score victories over enhancement talent such as Jim Powers (a five match winning streak in July), Paul Diamond, Mark Young, Jim Evans, and Pez Whatley, and even managed to get a shot at the WWF World Tag Team Titles to wrestle then-champions Demolition alongside Bart's partner for the match, Mark Ming, in a losing effort.

Bart was the opponent for several wrestlers making their debuts in the WWF. On April 24, 1990, Bart was defeated by Dustin Rhodes at a dark match at a Wrestling Challenge taping in San Antonio, Texas. This was Dustin's debut. On the July 21 episode of WWF Superstars of Wrestling, Bart teamed with Tom Stone to face the Legion of Doom in their first match with the company. On July 24, 1990, he was defeated by Shane Douglas at a house show in Los Angeles, California. Following a series of matches in July against Jim Powers where Powers emerged victorious in every encounter, he entered a house show series in August with Pez Whatley. He then moved on a to another house show program – this time with the former Killer Bee Jim Brunzell. Brunzell would win all of these encounters. In October Bart would enter a house show series with Dustin Rhodes and again would come up winless. That winter he began a series of matches with Saba Simba and Shane Douglas, coming up winless in all of those encounters.

On the January 19, 1991 edition of WWF Superstars of Wrestling, Bart teamed with WT Jones in an unsuccessful challenge to Tag Team Champions The Hart Foundation. This would be his final WWF match, as he returned to WCW shortly thereafter.

=== World Championship Wrestling (1991) ===
Less than a month after his final televised WWF appearance, Black Bart signed with World Championship Wrestling. He made his first appearance at house show in Jacksonville, FL on February 15, 1991. Teaming with Dan Spivey and Buddy Landell, the trio mounted an unsuccessful challenge to WCW Six-Man Tag-Team Champions Junkyard Dog, Ricky Morton, and Tommy Rich. That spring he renewed several rivalries, as he faced Sam Houston and Dustin Rhodes on the house show circuit.

WCW created a stable known as "the Desperados" consisting of Dutch Mantell, Black Bart, and Deadeye Dick. The Desperados were packaged with the gimmick of being three bumbling cowboys looking to meet up with Stan Hansen to go to WCW and become a team. Over the course of a few months, they were promoted through a series of vignettes by which they would be beaten up in saloons, searching ghost towns, and riding horses. The Desperadoes entered the ring for the first time at house show in Charlotte, NC on May 12, 1991, where they (Bart and Dutch Mantell) were defeated by The Young Pistols.

Bart made his first WCW PPV appearance seven days later at SuperBrawl I, when he substituted for Larry Zbyszko in a match against Big Josh. Later that month Bart began teaming regularly with Deadeye Dick in house show matches against Ricky Morton and Dustin Rhodes. The full Desperadoes trio entered the ring for the first time on July 3, 1991, in East Rutherford, NJ at the start of the 1991 The Great American Bash tour, where they were defeated by The Freebirds and Badstreet Brad Armstrong. On July 14 he wrestled Junkyard Dog in the dark match of the Great American Bash PPV. He later appeared as a lumberjack in a match between Big Josh and Black Blood.

While the Desperadoes angle continued and the trio was shown as late as the June 29 WCW Power Hour program still looking for Stan Hansen, the former AWA champion reportedly wanted no part of the storyline and left for Japan, never to return to wrestle in North America. Without Hansen, the group were pushed into service as jobbers and were dissolved as a stable before the end of the year. Bart's final match was on August 24, 1991, on the WCW Power Hour, when he teamed with Richard Myers against The WCW Patriots.

=== Late career (1991–2002, 2006) ===
Two months after departing from WCW, Bart re-emerged in Global Wrestling Federation. Teaming with Tug Taylor he faced Chris Walker and Steve Simpson. During his tenure he won the Bass Knuckles title, as well as the Tag Team Titles 3 times, including once with John Hawk. He also teamed with Bill Irwin as the Wild Bunch and Johnny Mantell as the Rough Riders.

Harris returned to WCW on November 26, 1995, when he participated in the 60 man, three ring battle royal at World War 3. Wrestling as "Big Train Bart", he was eliminated. He next appeared on WCW Saturday Night on November 30, where he faced Disco Inferno.

Harris wrestled in the independents for the rest of his career before retiring in 2002. Harris resurfaced in 2006 wrestling on some independent shows in Texas. Harris has also appeared at many NWA reunion events.

As a trainer, his most famous pupil to date has been John Bradshaw Layfield. Harris once ran a professional wrestling school at the Dallas Sportatorium. Other pupils of his include Necro Butcher.

== Personal life ==
A diabetic, Harris had heart bypass surgery in 2015.

In July 2016, Harris was named part of a class action lawsuit filed against WWE which alleged that wrestlers incurred traumatic brain injuries during their tenure and that the company concealed the risks of injury. The suit was litigated by attorney Konstantine Kyros, who has been involved in a number of other lawsuits against WWE. US District Judge Vanessa Lynne Bryant dismissed the case in September 2018. In September 2020, an appeal for the lawsuit was dismissed by a federal appeal court.

=== Illness and death ===
Harris was diagnosed with stage IV colon cancer in 2022. On December 24, 2024, it was reported by Dutch Mantell on his Story Time with Dutch Mantell podcast that Harris had ceased chemotherapy treatment and returned home from the hospital as his medical insurance ran out.

Rick Harris died on January 9, 2025, at the age of 76.

== Championships and accomplishments ==
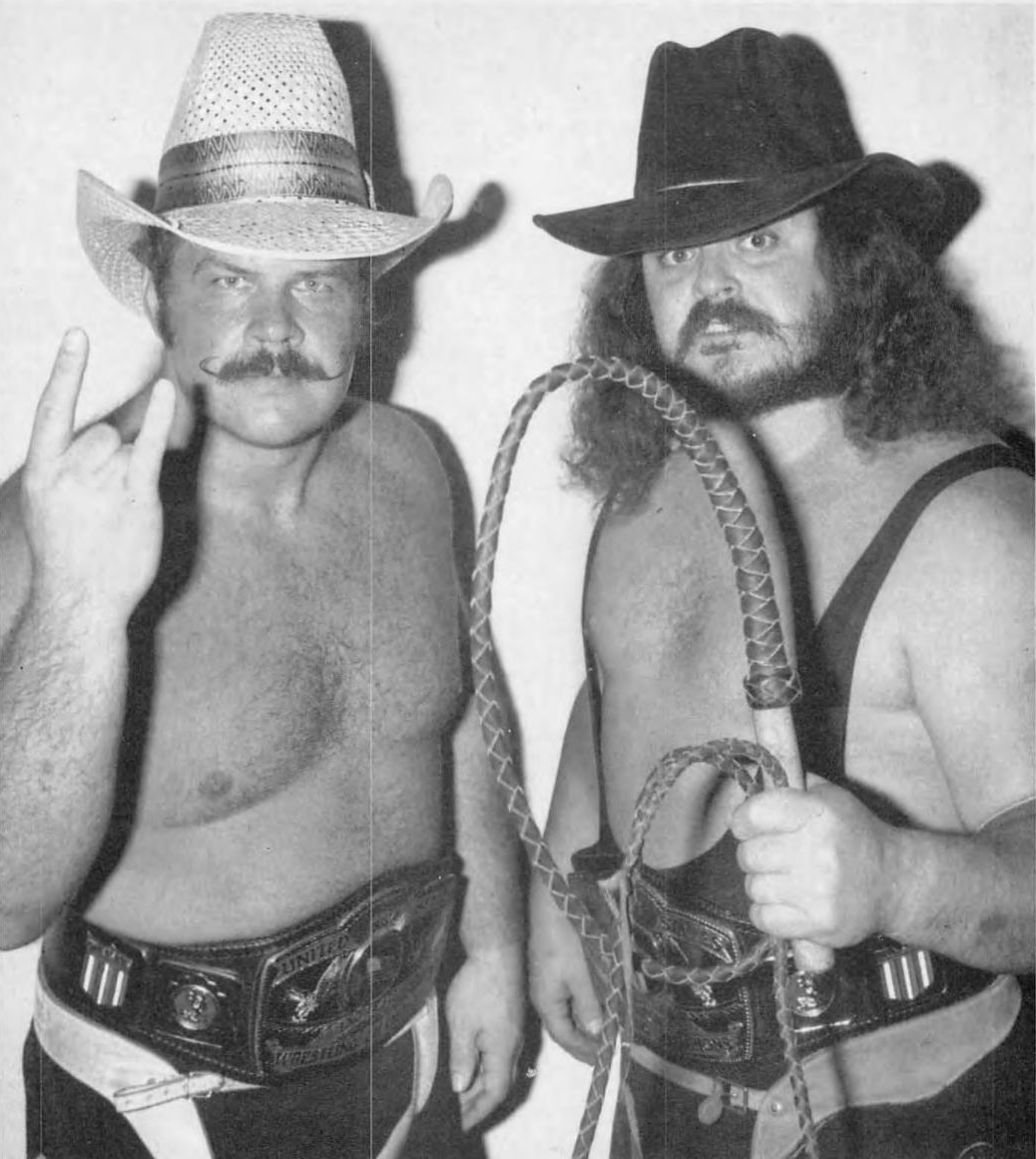
"The Black Outlaws" Bart (right) and Ron Bass (left) as NWA United States Tag Team Champions, c. 1984

- ACTS Wrestling Alliance
  - ACTS Heavyweight Championship (1 time)
- Cauliflower Alley Club
  - Courage Award (2024)
- Championship Wrestling from Florida
  - NWA Brass Knuckles Championship (Florida version) (1 time)
  - NWA Florida Tag Team Championship (2 times) – with Bobby Jaggers (1) and Tony Anthony (1)
  - NWA United States Tag Team Championship (Florida version) (3 times) – with Ron Bass
- Continental Wrestling Association
  - CWA Heavyweight Championship (2 times)
- Global Wrestling Federation
  - GWF Brass Knuckles Championship (1 time)
  - GWF Tag Team Championship (3 times) – with Bill Irwin (1), Johnny Mantel (1) and John Hawk (1)
- Jim Crockett Promotions
  - NWA Brass Knuckles Championship (Mid-Atlantic version) (1 time)
  - NWA Mid-Atlantic Heavyweight Championship (1 time)
  - NWA Mid-Atlantic Tag Team Championship (1 time) – with Ron Bass
  - NWA National Heavyweight Championship (1 time)
- Pro Wrestling Illustrated
  - PWI ranked him #348 of the 500 best singles wrestlers during the "PWI Years" in 2003
- Southeastern Championship Wrestling
  - NWA Alabama Heavyweight Championship (2 times)
- Texas Wrestling Hall of Fame
  - Class of 2013
- World Class Wrestling Association
  - WCWA World Heavyweight Championship (1 time)
