= Buzz Sawyer =

American professional wrestler

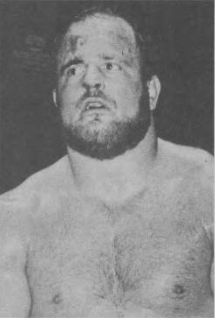
- Sawyer in 1982

Personal information
- Born: Bruce Alan Woyan; June 14, 1959 Gallipolis, Ohio, U.S.
- Died: February 7, 1992 (aged 32) Carmichael, California, U.S.
- Cause of death: Drug overdose
- Family: Brett Sawyer (brother)

Professional wrestling career
- Ring name: "Mad Dog" Buzz Sawyer
- Billed height: 5 ft 9 in (175 cm)
- Billed weight: 240 lb (109 kg)
- Billed from: St. Petersburg, Florida
- Debut: 1977

Bruce Allen Woyan (June 14, 1959 – February 7, 1992) was an American professional wrestler, better known by his ring name "Mad Dog" Buzz Sawyer.

An amateur wrestler at Dixie M. Hollins High School, he made his professional wrestling debut in 1977 and wrestled for several National Wrestling Alliance (NWA) territories. Throughout his career, Sawyer wrestled for Georgia Championship Wrestling (GCW), where he won the NWA National Heavyweight Championship and NWA National Tag Team Championship with his brother Brett, the World Wrestling Federation (WWF), Universal Wrestling Federation (UWF), where he won the UWF Television Championship, World Class Championship Wrestling (WCCW), where he won the WCWA Television Championship, WCWA Texas Heavyweight Championship and WCWA World Tag Team Championship with Matt Borne, and World Championship Wrestling (WCW). He also toured Japan with All Japan Pro Wrestling (AJPW) and New Japan Pro-Wrestling (NJPW).

== Early life ==
Bruce Allen Woyan was born on June 14, 1959, in Gallipolis, Ohio, and grew up in St. Petersburg, Florida, where he attended Dixie M. Hollins High School. There, he took part in amateur wrestling and was a state champion in the 191.5 pound weight class, amassing a 32–1 record. Woyan dropped out in 1977 to attend Seminole High School. However, he only attended "for about two or three weeks" before being withdrawn by Seminole, leading to him quitting school altogether. He briefly worked as a bouncer at a bar and restaurant.

== Professional wrestling career ==
=== Early career (1977–1984) ===
Woyan decided that he wanted to be a professional wrestler at the age of five and wrestled his first match at the age of 18 against The Mongolian Stomper, using the ring name Buzz Sawyer. In 1979, the National Wrestling Alliance (NWA) named him as the rookie of the year. On February 16, 1980, Sawyer defeated Bobby Jaggers in the finals of a tournament to win the vacant NWA Southeastern Television Championship. The following month, he lost the title to Dutch Mantel. On June 8, Sawyer and Matt Borne won the NWA Mid-Atlantic Tag Team Championship by defeating The Iron Sheik and Jimmy Snuka in a four-team tournament final, but lost the titles on September 28 to The Sheepherders (Butch Miller and Luke Williams). He also won the NWA Pacific Northwest Tag Team Championship with his brother, Brett Sawyer, by defeating Rip Oliver and The Destroyer on April 18, 1981. They lost the titles in a rematch on June 8.

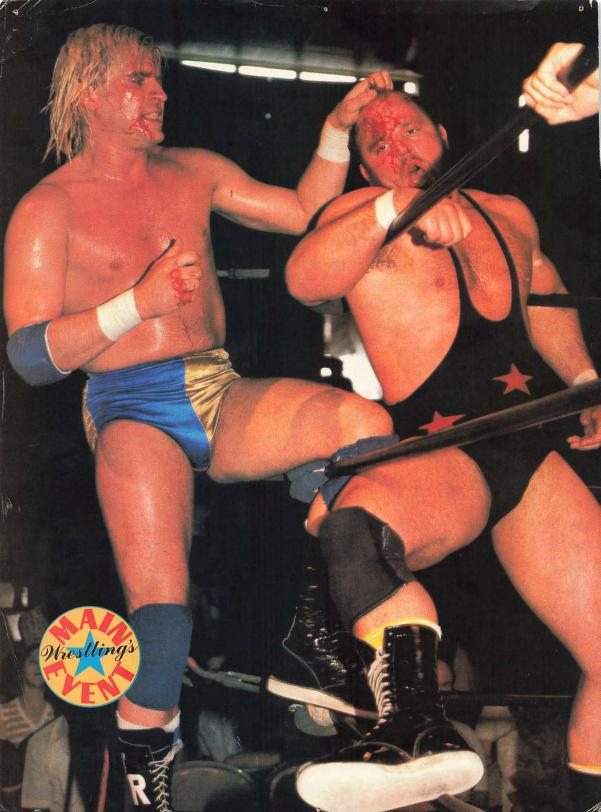
Sawyer (right) facing Tommy Rich in 1983

In early 1982, Sawyer began an eighteen-month feud with Tommy Rich in Georgia Championship Wrestling (GCW). On May 2, he defeated Rich to win the NWA National Heavyweight Championship, which he lost to Paul Orndorff on June 20. The following year, he became a member of the Legion of Doom stable, consisting of the Road Warriors (Hawk and Animal), Jake "The Snake" Roberts and The Spoiler. On October 23, 1983, Sawyer lost to Rich in a steel cage match billed as the "Last Battle of Atlanta", featuring a completely enclosed cage and Sawyer's manager Paul Ellering suspended 20 feet above the ring in a smaller cage, ending their feud. On November 27, Sawyer and Brett defeated the Road Warriors to win the NWA National Tag Team Championship. However, this title change is not recognized in Georgia. After Ole Anderson resigned as the booker of GCW, Sawyer was given the position and spearheaded the title change. The Road Warriors regained the titles in January 1984, and Sawyer was subsequently fired from GCW.

=== World Wrestling Federation (1984) ===
In 1984, Sawyer briefly wrestled for the World Wrestling Federation (WWF) as "Bulldog" Buzz Sawyer, since the "Mad Dog" moniker was being used by Maurice Vachon. Managed by Captain Lou Albano, he was often led to the ring in a dog chain and barked at fans.

=== All Japan Pro Wrestling (1984) ===
From October 20 to November 1, 1984, Sawyer appeared for All Japan Pro Wrestling (AJPW) as part of the "Giant Series" tour, often teaming with Goro Tsurumi, Harley Race and Terry Gordy against the likes of Giant Baba, Jumbo Tsuruta and The Great Kabuki.

=== Mid-South Wrestling / Universal Wrestling Federation (1985–1986) ===
Sawyer debuted for Mid-South Wrestling (which became the Universal Wrestling Federation in 1986) on September 28, 1985. After UWF Television Champion Dick Slater won the Mid-South North American Heavyweight Championship, he gave the Television Championship to Sawyer to defend for him. On March 16, 1986, Bill Watts tricked Sawyer into signing a contract that required him to defend Slater's North American Heavyweight Championship against Jim Duggan, ultimately losing the title. Sawyer subsequently turned on Slater by refusing to give back the Television Championship to him. On April 19, Sawyer teamed with Rick Steiner in the inaugural Jim Crockett Sr. Memorial Cup Tag Team Tournament, defeating Koko Ware and The Italian Stallion in the first round, before losing to Magnum T. A. and Ron Garvin in the second round. He then lost the Television Championship to Terry Taylor on May 25.

=== World Class Championship Wrestling (1986) ===
In 1986, Sawyer left the UWF for World Class Championship Wrestling (WCCW). On June 16, he defeated Chris Adams to win the WCWA Television Championship. He also won the WCWA Texas Heavyweight Championship by defeating Brian Adias on July 4 at Independent Day Star Wars. Later that night, he, Butch Reed and Matt Borne unsuccessfully challenged The Von Erichs (Kevin, Lance and Mike) for the WCWA World Six-Man Tag Team Championship. At Labor Day Star Wars on September 1, Sawyer and Borne took part in a tournament for the WCWA Tag Team Championship, defeating Adams and Lance Von Erich in the finals to win the titles. However, they lost the titles on November 17 to Lance and Dingo Warrior, with Master Gee substituting for Sawyer. In December, Sawyer quit WCCW to open a wrestling school.

=== New Japan Pro-Wrestling (1987–1989) ===
Sawyer made his debut for New Japan Pro-Wrestling (NJPW) in January 1987 as part of the "New Year Dash" tour, teaming with his brother Brett. From November 11 to December 7, 1988, Sawyer paired with Kendo Nagasaki and Manny Fernandez in the Japan Cup Elimination Tag League, a round-robin tournament of trios consisting of six-man tag team elimination matches. They finished with a total of 15 points, failing to advance to the semi-finals. On April 24, 1989, Sawyer lost to Victor Zangiev in the first round of a tournament for the IWGP Heavyweight Championship. He made his final NJPW appearance on August 10, teaming with Fernandez in a loss to Kengo Kimura and Masa Saito.

=== World Championship Wrestling (1989–1991) ===
Sawyer debuted for World Championship Wrestling (WCW) on November 1, 1989, as part of Gary Hart's J-Tex Corporation, feuding with the Four Horsemen. At Clash of the Champions X on February 6, 1990, Sawyer, The Dragon Master and The Great Muta lost to Ric Flair and The Andersons (Arn and Ole) in a steel cage match. At WrestleWar '90: Wild Thing on February 25, Sawyer and Kevin Sullivan defeated The Dynamic Dudes (Johnny Ace and Shane Douglas). Sawyer fractured his wrist during the match, accidentally coming down with his full weight on it after landing on Ace with a flying body press. He was released from the company shortly after the event. However, he returned to WCW in 1991 to work several dates in California.

=== Training wrestlers ===
Woyan operated a wrestling school in Sacramento, California, known as Buzz Sawyer's Pro Wrestling Academy. Among the wrestlers he trained include his brother Brett, Ken Shamrock, Terry "Magnum T.A." Allen, Tommy Rogers, and Mark "The Undertaker" Calaway. However, Woyan had a reputation for scamming aspiring wrestlers who paid for his services; he would often take their money, legitimately hurt them, and skip town. Calaway recounted being a victim of this scam and was involved in a backstage confrontation with Woyan over it when both men were in WCW.

== Personal life ==
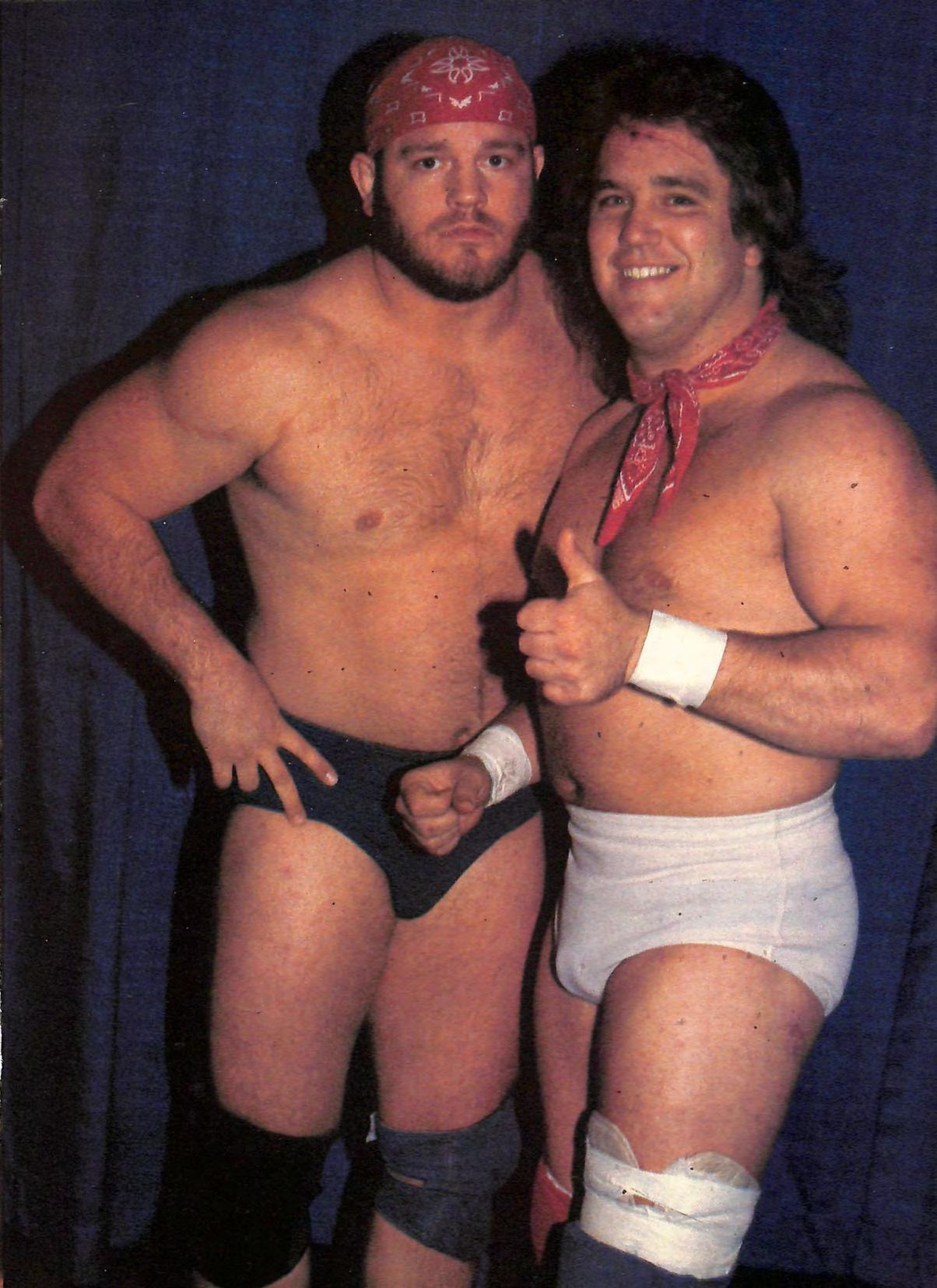
Sawyer (left) with his brother, Brett

Woyan's younger brother, Brett Eugene Woyan, was also a professional wrestler under the ring name Brett Sawyer.

Woyan was known for his antics both in and out of the ring, including his drug abuse and fighting with police outside a bar. He was arrested for felonious assault in July 1980 and battery in September 1982.

On February 7, 1992, Woyan's girlfriend found him passed out in the yard of his home in Carmichael, California. He was taken to Mercy San Juan Hospital, where he was pronounced dead at the age of 32 from heart failure due to a drug overdose.

== Championships and accomplishments ==
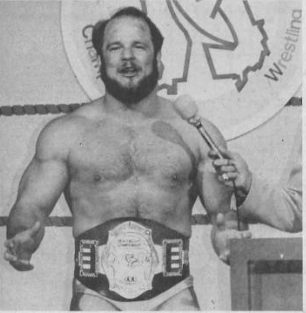
Sawyer as NWA National Heavyweight Champion, 1982

- Continental Wrestling Association
  - AWA Southern Heavyweight Championship (1 time)
- Georgia Championship Wrestling
  - NWA National Heavyweight Championship (1 time)
  - NWA National Tag Team Championship (1 time) – with Brett Sawyer
- Mid-Atlantic Championship Wrestling
  - NWA Mid-Atlantic Tag Team Championship (1 time) – with Matt Borne
- Mid-South Wrestling Association / Universal Wrestling Federation
  - UWF Television Championship (1 time)
- Pacific Northwest Wrestling
  - NWA Pacific Northwest Tag Team Championship (1 time) – with Brett Sawyer
- Pro Wrestling Illustrated
  - PWI ranked him #185 of the 500 best singles wrestlers during the "PWI Years" in 2003
- Southeastern Championship Wrestling
  - NWA Southeastern Television Championship (1 time)
- World Class Wrestling Association
  - WCWA Television Championship (1 time)
  - WCWA Texas Heavyweight Championship (1 time)
  - WCWA World Tag Team Championship (1 time) – with Matt Borne
- Wrestling Observer Newsletter
  - Most Underrated Wrestler (1981)
  - Best Heel (1982)
- WWE
  - WWE Hall of Fame (Class of 2021)
