= Buddy Landel =

American professional wrestler (1961–2015)

Personal information
- Born: William Fritz Ensor; August 14, 1961 Knoxville, Tennessee, U.S.
- Died: June 22, 2015 (aged 53) Chilhowie, Virginia, U.S.
- Cause of death: Complications after a car accident
- Spouses: Tuesday Smith (m. 1975; div. 1976) Donna Landel (m. 1981)
- Children: 3

Professional wrestling career
- Ring name: Buddy Landel
- Billed height: 6 ft 1 in (185 cm)
- Billed weight: 235 lb (107 kg)
- Billed from: Jacksonville, Florida
- Trained by: Boris Malenko; Bob Roop; Bob Orton Jr.
- Debut: 1979
- Retired: 2010

William Fritz Ensor (August 14, 1961 – June 22, 2015) was an American professional wrestler better known by the ring name "Nature Boy" Buddy Landel. He was best known for his work in the National Wrestling Alliance (NWA) territories.

== Early life ==
Landel first became interested in professional wrestling when a friend of his sister, Lou Anne Smith, introduced him to Bob Orton, Randy Savage and Boris Malenko. Landel was an amateur wrestler in high school, but dropped out during his junior year. While he was training with Boris Malenko, Landel lived in an apartment with Olympian Bob Roop.

== Professional wrestling career ==
=== Early career (1979–1981) ===
Landel started his career in 1979. In 1980 he worked for Angelo Poffo's International Championship Wrestling in the Midwest.

=== National Wrestling Alliance (1981–1986) ===
In 1981, he became a part of Bill Watts's Mid-South Wrestling. Landel made his debut on May 25, 1981, in New Orleans, LA and defeated Kelly Kiniski. The young wrestler was quite active, wrestling Ken Mantell, Carl Fergie, Jake Roberts, and The Great Kabuki. On August 18, 1981, he received his first title opportunity, but fell in defeat to Mississippi Champion Bob Orton. On September 29, 1981, he teamed with Jim Garvin in an unsuccessful challenge to MSW Tag-Team Champions The Wild Samoans, and after this moved on to Mid-Atlantic Championship Wrestling.

Less than two weeks later Landel surfaced in Jim Crockett's Mid-Atlantic Championship Wrestling, defeating Mike Miller in Asheville, NC. He was largely victorious against a number of opponents, including Charlie Fulton, Mike Miller, and Jeff Sword.

Landel returned to Mid-South Wrestling on March 3, 1982, defeating Bob Orton in a match held in Baton Rouge, LA. He stayed in Bill Watt's territory for the next few months, facing Rick Ferrara, Paul Orndorff, and One Man Gang. After several months in the promotion, Landell jumped to the Continental Wrestling Association on August 30, 1982. Teaming with Mike Graham, they battled Spike Huber and Steve Regal to a double count-out. After several months in the CWA, Landel returned to MSW and would split time between several National Wrestling Alliance promotions, including Mid-South, the CWA, and Houston Wrestling.

On March 8, 1983, he traveled to Capitol Sports Promotions and defeated Pierre Martel to win the WWC North American Heavyweight Title. This was Landel's first title, and he held the belt until June 25, 1983, when he lost to Pedro Morales in Guaynabo, Puerto Rico. That summer Landel defeated Dutch Mantell to win the NWA Mid-America Heavyweight Championship in Memphis, TN. He held the title until August 29, 1983, when he was defeated by Koko B. Ware. Landel regained the title on September 10, then holding it until he was defeated by Terry Taylor on December 1, 1983, in Lexington, KY. Landell spent all of 1984 splitting time between Mid-South and Houston Wrestling, facing competitors such as Terry Taylor, Jose Lothario, and Brickhouse Brown.

In 1985 he returned to Mid Atlantic Championship Wrestling (Jim Crockett Promotions), defeating Denny Brown at "MACW Title Night '85" in Raleigh, North Carolina on March 6. Landel joined manager J. J. Dillon's stable, and he unsuccessfully challenged Magnum T. A. for the United States Heavyweight Championship on March 29, 1985. He would wrestle Magnum several more times that spring but was unable to gain the title. On June 15, 1985, Buddy Landell received his first ever shot at the NWA World Heavyweight Championship, falling in defeat to "Nature Boy" Ric Flair in Greensboro, NC. A wrestling card with a Landel-Ric Flair main event on July 31, 1985, drew an overflow crowd at J.S. Dorton Arena in Raleigh, North Carolina. (Landel often claimed this crowd broke Elvis Presley's attendance record at the arena, but this has not been independently confirmed.) He won the NWA National Heavyweight Championship from Terry Taylor at Starrcade '85 in Greensboro, North Carolina.

Landel was set to win the NWA World Heavyweight Championship from Flair in 1985. However, Landel had a falling out with the management of Jim Crockett Promotions and left the company after dropping the National Heavyweight Championship to Dusty Rhodes on December 19, 1985.

He resurfaced in the Continental Wrestling Association January 4, 1986, and defeated David Haskins at a television taping in Memphis, TN. Seventeen days later he retook the CWA Mid-America Heavyweight Championship from Koko B. Ware, although his reign was brief as he was defeated for it by Dusty Rhodes on February 2. Landel regained the championship sixteen days later and held it until April 7, when he lost to Dutch Mantell. On April 19, 1986, he made a one-off return to Jim Crockett Promotions, teaming with Bill Dundee to participate in the Jim Crockett Sr. Memorial Cup. The duo was defeated in the first round by Steve Williams and Terry Taylor. On June 2, 1986, he defeated former partner Bill Dundee to win the AWA Southern Championship in a barbed wire match held in Mid-South Coliseum in Memphis, Tennessee. He briefly vacated the belt that month, then regained it in a tournament finale over The Flame (Roger Smith). With Bill Dundee, Dutch Mantell, and Jerry Lawler, he headlined the last sold-out show in the Mid-South Coliseum.

On July 27, 1986, Buddy Landel returned to Mid Atlantic Championship Wrestling and defeated George South at a television taping in Atlanta, GA. Accompanied by former foe turned partner Bill Dundee, Landel and Dundee both attacked South after the match. On the August 2nd episode of "World Championship Wrestling", announcer Tony Schiavone conducted a sit-down interview with Buddy Landel who claimed that he and not Ric Flair was the real "Nature Boy". In his first month back, he was programmed against opening level competition on house shows, facing and defeating Rocky King, Sam Houston, and Todd Champion. While Landel remained undefeated, Flair would not respond until the September 6th episode of NWA Pro, where he stated that he was "Space Mountain" while Buddy was "Ride the Wild Mouse". That same weekend on NWA Worldwide, Landel and Dundee claimed that Flair would only wrestle an injured competitor like Dusty Rhodes. Landel, however, would never wrestle Flair in this time period and instead faced Magnum T. A. and NWA Mid-Atlantic Heavyweight Champion Ron Garvin, wrestling each to a draw when they faced off.

=== Universal Wrestling Federation (1986) ===
Buddy Landel joined Bill Watts' Universal Wrestling Federation on October 10, 1986, and defeated Jeff Raitz at a house show in Tulsa, Oklahoma. Landel was unbeaten, defeating Joe Savoldi, Jeff Gaylord, and Chavo Guerrero.

=== Continental Championship Wrestling (1987) ===
He next jumped to National Wrestling Alliance affiliate Continental Championship Wrestling in February 1987, winning the NWA Southeastern Heavyweight Championship. During the first half of the year, he would face The Tennessee Stud (Ron Fuller) and Wendell Cooley.

=== American Wrestling Association (1987) ===
Landel joined Verne Gagne's American Wrestling Association on September 18, 1987, defeating ML Williams at a TV taping in Las Vegas, NV. His stay was short-lived and consigned only to that TV taping, where he also defeated Lance Allen and Chris Bassett.

=== All Japan Pro Wrestling (1988) ===
Buddy Landel made his first trip to an overseas promotion in January 1988 when he joined All Japan Pro Wrestling. His first appearance came at the "All Japan Pro Wrestling 100 Million Yen Capture 16 Man Battle Royal" on New Year's Day in Tokyo, Japan. During the tour Landel faced Akira Taue, Tiger Mask, Akio Sato, Hiroshi Wajima, John Tenta (Earthquake), and Jumbo Tsuruta.

=== Continental Wrestling Association (1988–1990) ===
He returned once more to the CWA on August 1, 1988, and unsuccessfully challenged AWA World Heavyweight Champion Jerry Lawler in Memphis, TN. While appearing in the CWA he also wrestled for Capitol Sports Promotions, and on August 20 defeated TNT (Savio Vega) for the WWC Caribbean Heavyweight Champion. He held the belt until September 17 when TNT regained it. Landel returned to the CWA and remained with the company as it transitioned into the United States Wrestling Association.

=== World Championship Wrestling (1990–1991) ===
On the June 9, 1990 episode of NWA Pro, Lance Russell conducted a backstage interview with Buddy Landel and talked about his return to the National Wrestling Alliance. Later that night he pinned Paul Drake. Later that month he began a house show series vs "Captain" Mike Rotundo but was winless. Landel made his first ever PPV appearance at the 1990 Great American Bash, losing to Brian Pillman. He next moved on to a house show series with Tom Zenk where he had considerably more success, and then faced Tommy Rich at multiple cards. On September 5 he suffered a televised loss to Mike Rotundo at Clash of the Champions XII "Fall Brawl: Mountain Madness". On the September 8 episode of WCW Worldwide he announced that he was going after titles, and the following week lost to Terry Taylor and still demanded a title shot. He finally faced off against old nemesis Ric Flair in a "Battle of the Nature Boys". He wrestled Flair in a "Gauntlet match" which aired on November 24, 1990. On February 24, 1991 he competed on his first WCW PPV, wrestling the newly arrived Dustin Rhodes at WrestleWar 91. After losing to Rhodes, he rebounded on February 26 on WCW Saturday Night by defeating Ranger Ross. During the match Terrance Taylor and Alexandra York appeared at ringside, beginning an angle where Landell was under consideration for membership in Alexandra York's The York Foundation. On the March 9 episode he stated that he would be holding a press conferenbce when he signed with the Foundation. On the March 16 edition of WCW Worldwide, Landell teamed with Taylor to defeat Bobby Eaton & Tom Zenk.

=== Global Wrestling Federation (1991) ===
Following a stint in the Tri-State Wrestling Alliance, Landel joined the newly created Global Wrestling Federation on June 28, 1991, and defeated Gary Young. He would lose to The Patriot in the finals for a tournament to crown the GWF Television Champion. Landel also continued to wrestle for the TWA, and was going to wrestle "Nature Boy" Buddy Rogers for his Tri-State Title in early 1992, but the promotion folded before the match could happen.

=== Smoky Mountain Wrestling (1991–1992) ===
Buddy Landel joined Jim Cornette's new promotion Smoky Mountain Wrestling for its inaugural TV taping on November 27, 1991, in Morristown, TN. Landel stated that he had refused to do favors for major promotions and had joined SMW to hurt people. His first wrestling match would not come until April 18, 1992, however; he defeated Reno Riggins on SMW television in his debut match. Landel feuded with Tim Horner that spring but was generally unsuccessful.

=== United States Wrestling Association (1992–1994) ===
He rejoined the USWA on August 17, 1992, teaming with Brian Christopher, Doug Gilbert and Eddie Gilbert to defeat Bill Dundee, The Rock 'n' Roll Express and Tommy Rich. On November 22, 1993, he defeated Jeff Jarrett to win the vacated USWA Heavyweight Championship. He would lose it to Brian Christopher on December 11, 1993. In 1994 he unsuccessfully attempted to regain the title from Tommy Rich and later Sid Vicious.

=== Return to Smoky Mountain Wrestling (1994–1995) ===
On December 25, 1994, Landel appeared at Christmas Chaos '94, defeating SMW Heavyweight Champion The Dirty White Boy via disqualification. Landel became one of the main eventers managed by Jim Cornette. Buddy held the SMW Heavyweight Championship and the SMW Television Championship in 1995. In August 1995 he earned a role in the movie Box of Moonlight, appearing in a scene wrestling Headbanger Thrasher. He remained a heroic character until the promotion folded in late 1995. Landel and Shawn Michaels set a record house at the Knoxville Coliseum.

=== World Wrestling Federation (1995–1996, 1997, 1998, 1999) ===
After Cornette closed SMW, both Cornette and Landel went to the World Wrestling Federation. Working without a contract, Landel began wrestling for the WWF on December 17, 1995, at In Your House. It would be his only WWF pay-per-view match. It was not a favorable debut though as he was defeated quickly by Ahmed Johnson in only 45 seconds. He continued to use a very similar image to Ric Flair, even using Flair's early 90s WWF entrance music. He made his Raw debut the next night, defeating Bob Holly. He also defeated Matt Hardy on the December 23, 1995, episode of Superstars. It was right after this match that Landel suffered a serious injury outside of the arena, slipping on ice and tearing his right quadriceps. He was out of action for six months as a result. Landel wrestled Bret Hart in a WWF World Heavyweight Championship match shown on Mania on January 13, 1996, although the match was taped prior to Landel's injury.

Landel returned to the WWF for a one-night appearance on February 20, 1997, wrestling against TL Hopper. On May 19, 1998, he worked a dark match against Edge. He had one last short run with the WWF in 1999, wrestling two matches on Shotgun Saturday Night, first on February 20, 1999, against The Godfather and then on February 27, 1999, against Triple H.

=== Late career (1996–2010) ===
After leaving WWF and recovering from his quadriceps injury Landel began wrestling on the independent scene, appearing first for Tennessee Mountain Wrestling and competing for them on multiple occasions. Landel also returned to the World Wrestling Council. In 1997 and 1998 he would wrestle for numerous other promotions as well, including IWA Mid-South, Ohio Valley Wrestling, NWA New Jersey, and the National Wrestling League. Landel won the AIWF World Title in 1998. He retired in 2003 where he teamed with Jerry Lawler and Jimmy Valiant defeating Bill Dundee, Mabel, and Jimmy Hart for Memphis Wrestling on September 28, 2003. In 2005 he worked at NWA Rocky Top promotion in Knoxville doing color commentary with Tony Basilio. Following a six-year absence from the ring, Landel returned at the XCW Mid-West: Legends Of The Louisville Gardens on March 3, 2009, to wrestle Flash Flanagan for the XCW Heavyweight Championship. On October 24, 2009, Landel appeared at the TWA Reunion Show in Vorhees, NJ. Still holding onto the TWA Heavyweight Championship, he then lost the title to Glen Osbourne.

Landel was honored as Most Influential WWF/WCW Wrestler from Kentucky by the state's governor and made a Kentucky Colonel in 1990.

He wrestled his final match at the NWA Wrestle Birmingham: The Big Bang event on November 19, 2010, where he teamed with Cameron Valentine and Greg Valentine to face Brutus Beefcake, Brickhouse Brown, and Jake Roberts.

On August 27, 2011, Landel was inducted into the Legends Pro Wrestling Hall of Fame.

== Personal life ==
Landel acknowledged that in 1985 he began abusing drugs, using them for 10 to 15 years. He hoped by talking about the rampant drug abuse in pro wrestling, that he could help newcomers to avoid the trials he went through. He also had some trouble with the IRS, but wrestling promoter Jim Crockett Jr. helped him pay the tax bill.

== Death ==
On June 21, 2015, Landel was involved in a car crash. He was hospitalized and reportedly checked himself out against his doctor's wishes, eventually returning to his home in Chilhowie, Virginia. He told his wife Donna that he was "feeling bad", and she found him dead the next morning. He left behind two daughters and four grandchildren, one of whom is Nick Osborne, who was drafted in 2019 by the Oakland Athletics.

== Championships and accomplishments ==
- American Independent Wrestling Federation
  - AIWF Heavyweight Championship (1 time)
  - AIWF Hall Of Fame (Class of 2016)**
- American Wrestling Federation
  - AWF Heavyweight Championship (1 time)
- Extreme Coastal Championship Wrestling
  - ECCW Heavyweight Championship (1 time)
- Independent Professional Wrestling Alliance
  - IPWA Heavyweight Championship (1 time)
- Independent Wrestling Alliance
  - IWA Heavyweight Championship (1 time)
- Independent Wrestling Association Mid-South
  - IWA Mid-South Heavyweight Championship (1 time)
- Jim Crockett Promotions
  - NWA National Heavyweight Championship (1 time)
- Legends Pro Wrestling
  - LPW Hall of Fame (Class of 2011)
- Memphis Wrestling Hall of Fame
  - Class of 2022
- Mid-Atlantic Wrestling Alliance
  - MAWA National Heavyweight Championship (1 time)
- Mid-South Wrestling Association
  - Mid-South Television Championship (1 time)
- New Dimension Wrestling
  - NDW Heavyweight Championship (2 times)
- NWA Mid-America / Continental Wrestling Association
  - AWA Southern Heavyweight Championship (2 times)
  - NWA Mid-America Heavyweight Championship (4 times)
- NWA New Jersey
  - NWA United States Tag Team Championship (1 time) – with Doug Gilbert
- Pro Wrestling Illustrated
  - PWI ranked him No. 72 of the 500 top singles wrestlers of the PWI Years in 1995
- Southeastern Championship Wrestling
  - NWA Southeast Continental Heavyweight Championship (1 time)
- Smoky Mountain Wrestling
  - SMW Heavyweight Championship (1 time)
  - SMW Beat the Champ Television Championship (1 time)
- Southeastern Championship Wrestling
  - SCW Heavyweight Championship (1 time)
- Southern States Wrestling
  - SSW Heavyweight Championship (1 time)
  - SSW Tag Team Championship (1 time) – with Beau James
  - Kingsport Wrestling Hall of Fame (Class of 2001)
- Tennessee Mountain Wrestling
  - TMW Heavyweight Championship (2 times)
- Tri-State Wrestling Alliance
  - TWA Heavyweight Championship (1 time)
- United Atlantic Championship Wrestling
  - UACW Tag Team Championship (2 times) – with Big Jesse
- United States Wrestling Association
  - USWA Heavyweight Championship (1 time)
- USA Wrestling
  - USA Tennessee Heavyweight Championship (2 times)
- National Championship Wrestling
  - NCW Heavyweight Championship (1 time)
- World Wrestling Council
  - WWC Caribbean Heavyweight Championship (1 time)
  - WWC Caribbean Tag Team Championship (1 time) – with Terry Gibbs
  - WWC North American Heavyweight Championship (1 time)
  - WWC North American Tag Team Championship (1 time) – with Terry Gibbs
- Other titles
  - UAW Tag Team Championship (1 time) – with Jesse Landell
