= Savannah Jack =

American professional wrestler

Personal information
- Born: Theodore "Ted" Russell; October 15, 1948 St. Paul, Minnesota
- Died: January 17, 2012 (aged 63) Minneapolis, Minnesota

Professional wrestling career
- Ring name(s): Savannah Jack; T-Bone Brown
- Billed height: 6 ft 2 in (1.88 m)
- Billed from: Savannah, Georgia
- Trained by: Eddie Sharkey; Verne Gagne
- Debut: 1985
- Retired: 1987

Theodore Russell (October 15, 1948 - January 17, 2012) was an American professional wrestler, best known under the ring name of "Savannah Jack" in Bill Watts' Universal Wrestling Federation in the Mid-South from 1986 to 1987. He won the UWF Television Championship.

== Early life ==
Russell started playing football for the University of Minnesota for the Minnesota Golden Gophers from 1969 to 1970.

== Pro wrestling career ==
Trained by Verne Gagne and Eddie Sharkey in Minnesota. He worked for the American Wrestling Association as T-Bone Brown in 1985.

In 1986 he made his debut as "Savannah Jack" in Universal Wrestling Federation working for Bill Watts. At first he was a member of Skandor Akbar's stable Devastation, Inc.. He defeated Buddy Roberts of The Fabulous Freebirds for the UWF Television Championship on November 9, 1986 in Tulsa, Oklahoma. He would feud with Chris Adams, One Man Gang, Iceman Parsons and Sting. He lost the title to Eddie Gilbert on March 8, 1987. Later that year he retired from wrestling due to health problems that caught up with him in Fort Worth, Texas, where he coughed up a blood clot shortly before a match. He returned to Minnesota and was diagnosed with cardiomyopathy caused by years of steroid abuse.

== Death ==
After many years of health problems, Savannah Jack suffered a stroke in 2001. On January 17, 2012, Jack died from cardiomyopathy after 25 years of heart problems in his home in Minneapolis. He was 63.

== Championships and accomplishments ==
- Pro Wrestling America
  - PWA Tag Team Championship (1 time) - with Ed Roberts
- Universal Wrestling Federation (Bill Watts)
  - UWF Television Championship (1 time)

== Bibliography ==
- Bixenspan, David (September 2, 2009). "Everything that you ever wanted to know about Savannah Jack". CagesideSeats.com.
- Walsh, Paul (January 24, 2012). "Obit: Former U football player, pro wrestler 'Savannah Jack' Russell". Star Tribune.
