= NWA Southeastern Television Championship =

Professional wrestling championship

NWA Southeast Television Championship

Details
- Promotion: Southeast Championship Wrestling
- Date established: July 1977
- Date retired: 1985
Statistics
- First champion(s): Mongolian Stomper
- Final champion(s): Robert Fuller

The NWA Southeast Television Championship was a minor title in the National Wrestling Alliance's Alabama territory known as Southeast Championship Wrestling. It existed from 1977 until 1985.

== Title history ==
Key
No.	Overall reign number
Reign	Reign number for the specific champion
Days	Number of days held

No.	Champion	Championship change			Reign statistics		Notes	Ref.
No.	Champion	Date	Event	Location	Reign	Days	Notes	Ref.
1	Mongolian Stomper	July 1977	SCW Show	N/A	1	(Note: The exact date the championship was won and lost is uncertain, placing the title reign at between 214 and 273 days.)	Records unclear as to whom he defeated	
2	Robert Fuller	March 1978	SCW Show	N/A	1	(Note: The exact date the championship was won is uncertain, placing the title reign at between 175 and 205 days.)		
3	Boris Malenko	September 22, 1978	SCW Show	Knoxville, Tennessee	1	(Note: The exact date the championship was vacated is uncertain, placing the title reign at between 9 and 39 days.)		
—	Vacated	October 1978	—	—	—	—	Championship vacated for undocumented reasons	
4	Bob Roop	April 1979	SCW Show	N/A	1	(Note: The exact date the championship was won and vacated is uncertain, placing the reign at between 154 and 213 days.)		
—	Vacated	October 1979	—	—	—	—	Title vacant for undocumented reasons	
5	Buzz Sawyer	February 16, 1980	SCW Show	Knoxville, Tennessee	1	(Note: The exact date the championship was lost is uncertain, placing the reign at between 14 and 34 days.)	Defeated Bobby Jaggers in tournament final.	
6	Dutch Mantel	March 1980	SCW Show	N/A	1			
7	Troy T. Tyler	March 22, 1980	SCW Show	Knoxville, Tennessee	1	(Note: The exact date the championship was lost is uncertain, putting the reign at between 40 and 70 days.)		
8	The Matador	May 1980	SCW Show	N/A	1	(Note: The exact date the championship was won and lost is uncertain, putting the reign at between 1 day and 30 days.)		
9	Terry Taylor	May 1980	SCW Show	N/A	1	(Note: The length of the reign is too uncertain to calculate.)		
—	Vacated	1980-1981	N/A	N/A	—	—	Championship became inactive	
10	Robert Fuller	December 1985	SCW Show	N/A	2			
—	Deactivated	1986	—	—	—	—	Title inactive	

== See also ==
- National Wrestling Alliance
- Southeast Championship Wrestling
