= Dark Journey (wrestling) =

American professional wrestler

Personal information
- Born: Lynda Newton; May 25, 1957 (age 69) Los Angeles, California, U.S.
- Spouse: Brent
- Children: 1

Professional wrestling career
- Ring name: Dark Journey
- Debut: 1985
- Retired: 1987

Lynda Newton (born May 25, 1957) is an American naturopath and retired professional wrestling valet and professional wrestler, better known by her ring name, Dark Journey, during the 1980s.

== Early life ==
Newton was born in Los Angeles, California. She was raised by her grandparents in Brockton, Massachusetts, until the age of nine, when she began living with her mother. Newton attended Brockton High School, leaving in the middle of her senior year. She lived in California and Florida before moving to Atlanta, Georgia.

== Professional wrestling career ==
=== Mid-South Wrestling/Universal Wrestling Federation (1985–1987) ===
In 1985, Newton met professional wrestler Dick Slater while working as a stripper in Atlanta. Slater introduced her to professional wrestling, bringing her into Mid-South Wrestling as his valet under the ring name "Dark Journey".

Dark Journey was initially a villainous character. As a biracial woman in the socially conservative Southern United States, her relationship with Slater attracted controversy. Dark Journey assisted Slater in his feuds with opponents such as Butch Reed, Jake Roberts and Jim Duggan.

In 1986, Newton ended her romantic relationship with Slater, who left Mid-South Wrestling (by then renamed the Universal Wrestling Federation) shortly thereafter. Dark Journey turned face and became a valet for the newly-arrived The Missing Link. In mid-1986, the duo began a feud with John Tatum and his valet, Missy Hyatt. Dark Journey and Hyatt would regularly engage in catfights at ringside. In September and October 1986, Dark Journey and The Missing Link faced Tatum and Hyatt in a series of mixed tag team matches. In early 1987, The Missing Link and Dark Journey began feuding with The Fabulous Freebirds and their valet Sunshine. On April 11, 1987, Dark Journey faced Nickla Roberts, Hyatt and Sunshine in a four way bout at "Superblast at the Superdome", held in the Superdome in New Orleans, Louisiana.

=== Jim Crockett Promotions (1987) ===
In April 1987, the Universal Wrestling Federation was acquired by the Charlotte, North Carolina–based Jim Crockett Promotions. Newton's contract was transferred over to Jim Crockett Promotions, and she became a valet for Tully Blanchard, a member of The Four Horsemen. Following The Great American Bash tour in July 1987, Newton was released from Jim Crockett Promotions, subsequently retiring from professional wrestling.

== Naturopathy career ==
After retiring from professional wrestling, Newton returned to Los Angeles. She worked in a number of jobs before becoming the manager of a clothing store. In the late-1990s, she opened her own chain of stores in Los Angeles County. In the early-2000s, she began working in naturopathy, gaining certification as a massage therapist and colon hydrotherapist.

== Personal life ==
Newton is married to Brent, with whom she has a son, Zane.

== Championships and accomplishments ==
- Women's Wrestling Hall of Fame
  - Class of 2025
