= UWF Television Championship =

Professional wrestling championship

Details
- Promotion: Universal Wrestling Federation; World Championship Wrestling
- Date established: May 2, 1984
- Date retired: November 26, 1987

Other name
- Mid-South Television Championship
Statistics
- First champion: Krusher Khruschev
- Final champion: Nikita Koloff
- Most reigns: Terry Taylor (4 times)
- Longest reign: Eddie Gilbert (148 days)
- Shortest reign: Nikita Koloff (less than one day)

The UWF Television Championship was a professional wrestling championship promoted by the Universal Wrestling Federation. It originated as the Mid-South Television Championship in 1984 and was then represented by a medal. It was renamed when Mid-South Wrestling changed its name to the UWF in 1986 and the title medal was replaced by a belt. The UWF Television Championship was the mid-level wrestlers' title during its existence. The title's final appearance was during Nikita Koloff's interview on the November 28, 1987 edition of World Championship Wrestling, with Koloff then declaring the NWA World Television Championship was the only television championship, effectively unifying the UWF Television Championship into its NWA counterpart and retiring the former championship.

== Title history ==
Key
| No. | Overall reign number |
| Reign | Reign number for the specific champion |
| Days | Number of days held |

| No. | Champion | Championship change | | | Reign statistics | | Notes | Ref. |
| No. | Champion | Date | Event | Location | Reign | Days | Notes | Ref. |
|---|---|---|---|---|---|---|---|---|
| 1 | Krusher Khruschev | May 2, 1984 | MSW Show | Shreveport, Louisiana, United States | 1 | 45 | Defeated Terry Taylor in tournament final; Magnum T. A. defeats Khruschev in May 1984, but the groggy ref gives the title medal to Khruschev | |
| 2 | Terry Taylor | June 16, 1984 | MSW Show | New Orleans, Louisiana, United States | 1 | 102 | | |
| 3 | Adrian Street | September 26, 1984 | MSW Show | Shreveport, Louisiana, United States | 1 | 42 | | |
| 4 | Bill Dundee | November 7, 1984 | MSW Show | Shreveport, Louisiana, United States | 1 | 38 | | |
| 5 | "Nature Boy" Buddy Landel | December 15, 1984 | MSW Show | Shreveport, Louisiana, United States | 1 | 18 | | |
| 6 | Terry Taylor | January 2, 1985 | MSW Show | Shreveport, Louisiana, United States | 2 | 70 | | |
| — | Vacated | March 13, 1985 | — | N/A | — | — | Terry Taylor won North American Championship | |
| 7 | Snowman | May 8, 1985 | MSW Show | Shreveport, Louisiana, United States | 1 | 63 | defeated Jake Roberts in tournament final | |
| 8 | Dutch Mantell | July 10, 1985 | MSW Show | Shreveport, Louisiana, United States | 1 | 12 | | |
| 9 | Butch Reed | July 22, 1985 | MSW Show | New Orleans, Louisiana, United States | 1 | 84 | | |
| — | Vacated | October 14, 1985 | — | N/A | — | — | Butch Reed won North American Championship | |
| 10 | Jake Roberts | January 1, 1986 | MSW Show | Tulsa, Oklahoma, United States | 1 | 58 | Defeated Dick Slater in tournament final | |
| 11 | Dick Slater | February 28, 1986 | MSW Show | Houston, Texas, United States | 1 | 16 | Renamed the UWF Television Championship during Slater's reign | |
| 12 | Buzz Sawyer | March 16, 1986 | UWF show | Oklahoma City, Oklahoma, United States | 1 | 70 | Given title by Slater | |
| 13 | Terry Taylor | May 25, 1986 | UWF show | Tulsa, Oklahoma, United States | 3 | 126 | | |
| 14 | Buddy Roberts | September 28, 1986 | UWF show | Oklahoma City, Oklahoma, United States | 1 | 42 | | |
| 15 | Savannah Jack | November 9, 1986 | UWF show | Tulsa, Oklahoma, United States | 1 | 119 | | |
| 16 | Eddie Gilbert | March 8, 1987 | UWF show | Tulsa, Oklahoma, United States | 1 | 148 | | |
| 17 | Shane Douglas | August 3, 1987 | UWF show | Morgan City, Louisiana, United States | 1 | 30 | | |
| 18 | Terry Taylor | September 2, 1987 | UWF show | Lafayette, Louisiana, United States | 4 | 85 | | |
| 19 | Nikita Koloff | November 26, 1987 | Starrcade '87: Chi-Town Heat | Chicago, Illinois, United States | 1 | 0 | | |
| — | Deactivated | November 26, 1987 | — | N/A | — | — | Koloff unified title with NWA World Television Championship | |

== See also ==
- Universal Wrestling Federation
- NWA World Television Championship
