= Mid-South North American Heavyweight Championship =

Professional wrestling championship

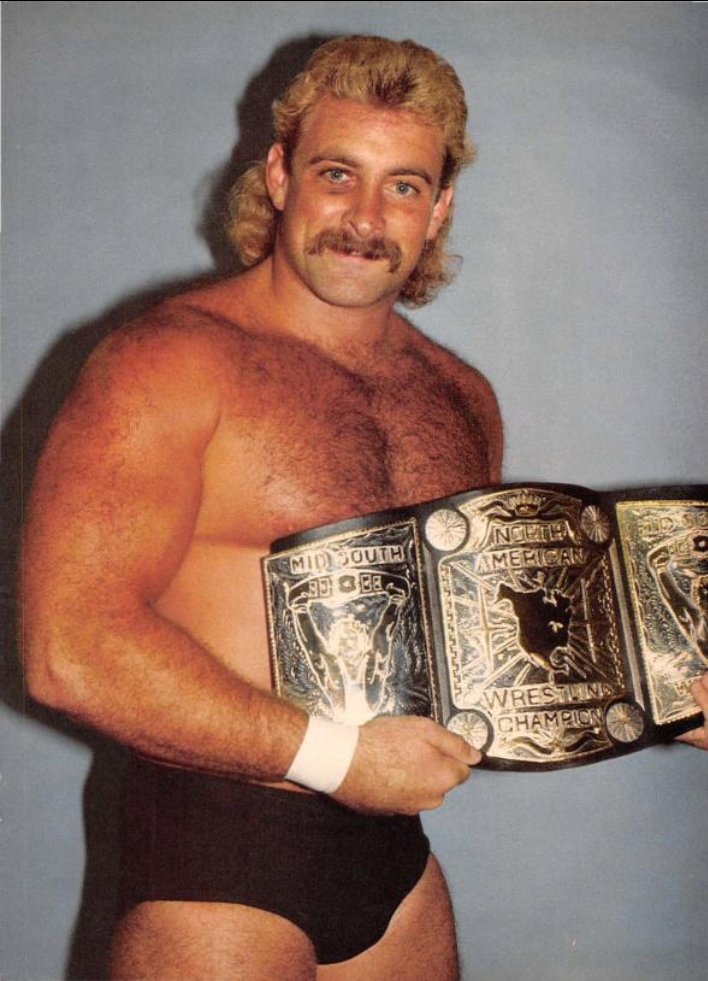
- Magnum T. A. posing with the championship belt in 1984

Details
- Promotion: Mid-South Wrestling Association
- Date established: June 23, 1969
- Date retired: c. May 1986

Other names
- NWA North American Heavyweight Championship (Tri-State); MSWA North American Heavyweight Championship
Statistics
- First champion: Chuck Karbo
- Most reigns: Bill Watts (9 reigns)
- Longest reign: Bill Watts (404 days)
- Shortest reign: Nikolai Volkoff (1 day)
- Oldest champion: The Great Zimm (At least 43 years, 90 days)
- Youngest champion: Ted DiBiase (22 years, 320 days)
- Heaviest champion: Ernie Ladd (325 lb (147 kg; 23.2 st))
- Lightest champion: Terry Taylor (225 lb (102 kg; 16.1 st))

The Mid-South North American Heavyweight Championship was the major singles title in the Mid-South Wrestling Association from 1979 until the promotion became the Universal Wrestling Federation in 1986. The title was retired then in favor of the UWF Heavyweight Championship. The promotion was originally a member of the National Wrestling Alliance referred to as NWA Tri-State, hence the title was originally the Tri-State version of the NWA North American Heavyweight Championship from 1969 to 1979.

The current design of All Elite Wrestling's women's championship, introduced in 2022, was heavily inspired by that of the Mid-South North American Heavyweight Championship.

== Title history ==
Wrestler:	Times:	Date:	Location:	Notes:
NWA North American Heavyweight Championship (Tri-State version)
Chuck Karbo	1	June 23, 1969	Los Angeles	Wins a tournament to become the first champion.
Danny Hodge	1	August 15, 1969	Little Rock, AR	
Chuck Karbo	2	October 6, 1969		
Danny Hodge	2	October 21, 1969	Little Rock, AR	
Chuck Karbo	3	October 23, 1969		
Tarzan Baxter	1	October 31, 1969	Oklahoma City, OK	
The Spoiler	1	February 17, 1970	Little Rock, AR	
Danny Hodge	3	March 1970		
The Spoiler	2	March 20, 1970	Oklahoma City, OK	
Bill Watts	1	April 12, 1970	Tulsa, OK	
Dusty Rhodes	1	May 21, 1971	Shreveport, LA	
Bill Watts	2	October 1971		Sometime before October 19, 1971.
The Stomper	1	March 1972		
Bill Watts	3	April 19, 1972		
Dale Lewis	1	May 15, 1972	Shreveport, LA	
Bill Watts	4	May 22, 1972	Shreveport, LA	Declared vacant in the Tri-State area in August 1973 when Watts leaves the area; Watts continues to defend in Florida and Georgia.
Tri-State version while Watts was in Georgia/Florida
Tank Morgan	1	November 12, 1973	Shreveport, LA	Defeats Dewey Robertson in tournament final for Tri-State Version.
Rip Tyler	1	February 11, 1974	Shreveport, LA	Recognized champion in Tri-State.
Apache Bull Ramos	1	April 1974		Recognized champion in Tri-State.
Buddy Colt	1	May 3, 1974		Defeats Watts in Florida/Georgia version.
Bob Armstrong	1	June 8, 1974		Recognized Champion in Florida/Georgia and still champion as of February 1975.
Armand Hussian	1	July 29, 1974	Shreveport, LA	Recognized champion in Tri-State.
Skandor Akbar	1	December 1974	Shreveport, LA	Recognized champion Tri-State and still champion as of may 14, 1975.
Buddy Colt	2	February 1975		Recognized champion in Florida/Georgia.
Bill Watts	5	February 21, 1975		Awarded Florida/Georgia version when Colt is injured in a plane crash.
Danny Miller	1	May 14, 1975	Jackson, MS	Recognized champion in Tri-State.
Dick Murdoch	1	June 5, 1975	New Orleans, LA	Recognized champion in Tri-State.
Killer Karl Kox	1	October 28, 1975	Shreveport, LA	Recognized champion in Tri-State.
Bill Watts	6	November 26, 1975	Jackson, MS	Defeats Kox to end the dispute. Has been recognized as champion in Florida and Georgia to unifies the Tri-State version.
The Spoiler	3	November 9, 1976	Shreveport, LA	
The Brute	1	November 23, 1976		Awarded after defending title for The Spoiler.
Ted DiBiase	1	December 1976		
The Great Zimm	1	February 1977	Shreveport, LA	
Dick Murdoch	2	March 1, 1977	Shreveport, LA	
Stan Hansen	1	May 2, 1977	Tulsa, OK	
Bill Watts	7	June 20, 1977	Tulsa, OK	
Dick Murdoch	3	August 4, 1977		
Jerry Oates	1	August 1977	Albuquerque, NM	
Dick Murdoch	4	November 6, 1977	Shreveport, LA	
Ernie Ladd	1	February 14, 1978	Shreveport, LA	
Paul Orndorff	1	May 29, 1978	Tulsa, OK	
Ernie Ladd	2	June 1978		
Paul Orndorff	2	June 1978		
Stan Hansen	2	July 1978		
Paul Orndorff	3	July 29, 1978	Baton Rouge, LA	
Ernie Ladd	3	August 15, 1978		
Ray Candy	1	November 17, 1978	Shreveport, LA	
Ernie Ladd	4	December 25, 1978	New Orleans, LA	Wins by forfeit.
Mr. Wrestling II	1	February 16, 1979	Atlanta, GA	Became MSWA Title in August 1979.
Renamed Mid-South North American Heavyweight Championship
Mike George	1	September 5, 1979	Shreveport, LA	Wrestling II is still/again billed as champion in Georgia as of October 19, 1979.
Bill Watts	8	December 4, 1979	Baton Rouge, LA	
Mike George	2	December 6, 1979	?	Title returned.
Bill Watts	9	January 5, 1980	Alexandria, LA	
Mike George	3	January 19, 1980	Alexandria, LA	
Ted DiBiase	2	February 1, 1980	Shreveport, LA	
The Grappler	1	September 19, 1980	Shreveport, LA	
Jake Roberts	1	June 30, 1981	Shevreport, LA	
Paul Orndorff	4	July 4, 1981	New Orleans, LA	
Ted DiBiase	3	November 1, 1981	Lake Charles, LA	
Paul Orndorff	5	January 6, 1982	Shreveport, LA	Aired on Mid-South TV January 9, 1982. This match had a special stipulation where disqualification would count as a pinfall. Orndorff wins the match due to outside interference by Bob Roop.
Ted DiBiase	4	January 6, 1982	Shreveport, LA	Aired on Mid-South TV January 9, 1982. DiBiase regained the belt via disqualification when Orndorff attacked him with the belt immediately after the match.
Bob Roop	1	March 17, 1982	Shreveport, LA	
Junkyard Dog	1	June 21, 1982	New Orleans, LA	
Ted DiBiase	5	June 23, 1982	Shreveport, LA	
Stagger Lee (Junkyard Dog)	2	November 25, 1982	New Orleans, LA	JYD lost loser-leaves-town for 90 days match & returned as masked Stagger Lee.
Vacated		February 1983		Vacated when Stagger Lee "left the area" (Junkyard Dog's 90-day suspension ended). Mr. Olympia won a 12-man tournament for the vacated title on March 21, 1983, in Shreveport, Louisiana. The decision was reversed, and the title held up, when it was revealed that the pin was counted with Junkyard Dog face-down on the mat.
Junkyard Dog	3	April 16, 1983	New Orleans, LA	Defeats Mr. Olympia in rematch
Butch Reed	1	July 16, 1983	New Orleans, LA	
Magnum T. A.	-	October 12, 1983	Shreveport, LA	Junkyard Dog was the special guest referee appointed by Mid-South match maker Grizzly Smith. Junkyard Dog was supposed to be Reed's opponent as the fans had picked the Dog in an applause contest to face Reed for the title but Reed instead refused to defend the title against the Dog and instead picked Magnum T. A. who was in the same applause contest. Butch Reed filed a protest with Mid-South and Mid-South would reverse the match decision on October 24, 1983, citing that Butch Reed did not have the authority to pick his own opponent, therefore that match never happened, the next title match of Magnum T. A. vs Nikolai Volkoff was also stricken from the record, and the title was returned to Reed. That announcement was aired on Mid-South TV October 29, 1983.
Nikolai Volkoff	-	October 24, 1983	New Orleans, LA	Mid-South would strike this match from the record on October 24, 1983. That announcement was aired on Mid-South TV October 29, 1983.
Butch Reed	2	October 24, 1983	New Orleans, LA	Aired on Mid-South TV October 29th, 1983. Title returned after Magnum's victory is reversed.
Junkyard Dog	4	October 26, 1983	Shreveport, LA	Aired on Mid-South TV October 29th, 1983. Dusty Rhodes was the special guest referee appointed by Mid-South.
Mr. Wrestling II	2	March 12, 1984	New Orleans, LA	
Magnum T. A.	1	May 13, 1984	Tulsa, OK	
Ernie Ladd	5	October 16, 1984	Shreveport, LA	
Brad Armstrong	1	December 5, 1984	Shreveport, LA	
Ted DiBiase	6	January 16, 1985	Shreveport, LA	
Terry Taylor	1	March 13, 1985	Shreveport, LA	
The Nightmare	1	May 22, 1985	Shreveport, LA	Aired on Mid-South TV May 30th, 1985.
Dick Murdoch	5	August 10, 1985	New Orleans, LA	
Butch Reed	3	October 14, 1985	New Orleans, LA	
Dick Slater	1	January 1, 1986	Tulsa, OK	
Held up after match against Jake Roberts on January 31, 1986, in Houston, Texas.
Jake Roberts	2	February 14, 1986	Houston, TX	Wins rematch.
Dick Slater	2	February 23, 1986	Oklahoma City, OK	
Hacksaw Jim Duggan	1	March 16, 1986	Oklahoma City, OK	Defeats Buzz Sawyer, who was defending for Slater.
Title retired in May 1986 as Mid-South Wrestling Association becomes the UWF.

== See also ==
- Universal Wrestling Federation
- UWF Heavyweight Championship
- Georgia Championship Wrestling
- Florida Championship Wrestling
- GWF North American Heavyweight Championship
- NWA North American Heavyweight Championship after 1995
