= Universal Wrestling Federation (Bill Watts) =

American professional wrestling promotion

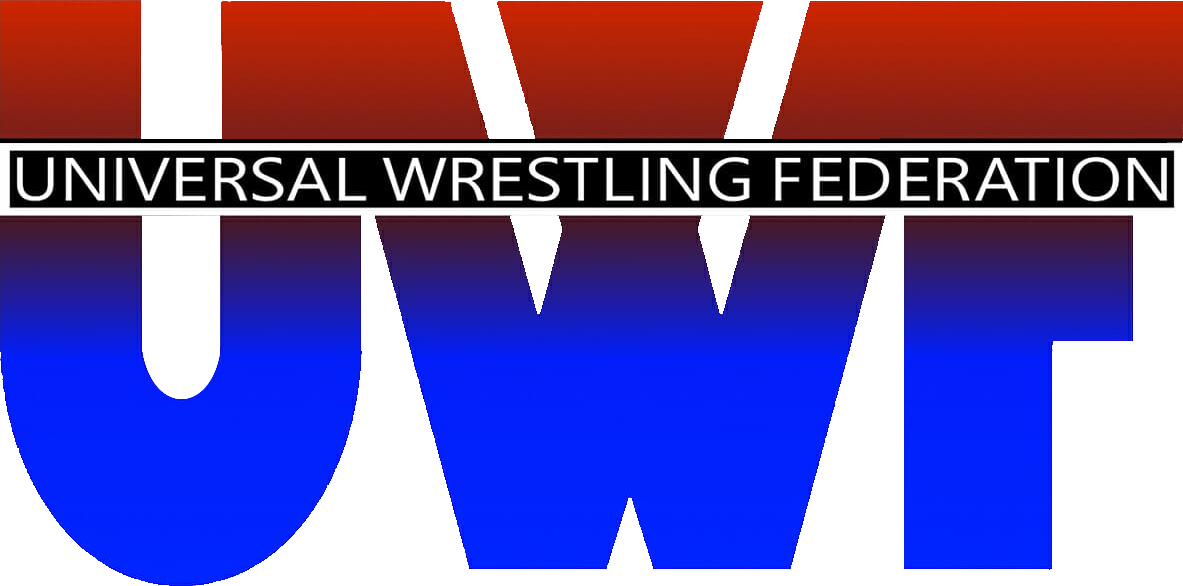
- Acronym: UWF
- Founded: 1950s (NWA Tri-State); 1979 (Mid-South); 1986 (UWF)
- Defunct: 1987
- Style: American wrestling
- Headquarters: Bixby, Oklahoma
- Founder(s): Bill Watts (UWF); Leroy McGuirk (NWA Tri-State)
- Owner(s): Leroy McGuirk (1950s–1979); Bill Watts (1979–1987); Jim Crockett, Jr. (1987)
- Parent: Jim Crockett Promotions (1987)
- Sister: Houston Wrestling
- Formerly: NWA Tri-State (1950s–1979); Mid-South Wrestling (1979–1986)
- Website: http://www.universalwrestling.com

The Universal Wrestling Federation (UWF) was a 1986 re-branding of wrestler-turned-promoter Bill Watts' Mid-South Wrestling promotion. Watts' goal was to elevate his promotion from a relatively smaller, regional-level business, to a national-level rival of the World Wrestling Federation (WWF, now known as WWE) and Jim Crockett Promotions. However, Watts' business strategy quickly swung from "overnight" success to catastrophic failure, in large part due to financial difficulties stemming from the 1980s oil glut, resulting in the 1987 sale of the UWF to Jim Crockett Promotions (owner of Mid-Atlantic Wrestling, Georgia Championship Wrestling, controllers of the National Wrestling Alliance (NWA)'s most important championships, and the predecessor of World Championship Wrestling (WCW).) The promotion began as an NWA territory, NWA Tri-State, founded by Leroy McGuirk in the 1950s, and was purchased by Bill Watts in 1979. Tri-State/Mid-South/UWF promoted shows in Oklahoma, Arkansas, Louisiana and Mississippi until 1987.

Because Watts did not register the "Universal Wrestling Federation" name with the United States Patent and Trademark Office, businessman Herb Abrams was able to use it to launch an unrelated wrestling promotion of the same name in 1990.

== History ==
=== NWA Tri-State (1950s–1979) ===
A former territory wrestler who was blinded in a 1950 auto accident, Leroy McGuirk eventually took over promoting a wrestling circuit covering Oklahoma, Louisiana and Mississippi. Until 1973, "Cowboy" Bill Watts had been one of Tri-State's most popular wrestlers. After leaving Tri-State for Eddie Graham's Championship Wrestling from Florida, Watts returned to Tri-State in 1975. NWA Tri-State fought a two-year promotional war against International Championship Wrestling that included the "outlaw" promotion filing an antitrust lawsuit against McGuirk and Watts.

=== Mid-South Wrestling (1979–1986) ===
In 1979, Bill Watts acquired the Tri-State Wrestling territory from Leroy McGuirk, and re-branded it Mid-South Wrestling (MSW; officially, the Mid-South Wrestling Association). One of Watts' first acts as owner was to withdraw the company from the National Wrestling Alliance (NWA). However, MSW would remain loosely aligned with the NWA, continuing to have the NWA World Heavyweight Champion defend the title on MSW shows, which spiked live event sales. (During the "territory" system in place from the 1940s to the 1980s, the NWA World Heavyweight Champion would travel to each NWA-affiliated territory to defend the title against its top-drawing local star.) MSW then added Arkansas to its circuit. In 1982, MSW expanded to Oklahoma when McGuirk closed his personal, Oklahoma-based promotion. McGuirk also formed an alliance with Houston promoter Paul Boesch to feature Mid-South talent on shows at the Sam Houston Coliseum (one of the most famous arenas in professional wrestling), and other parts of southeastern Texas. Mid-South used Shreveport, Louisiana as the base for its television tapings, which were first housed in the studios of KTBS-TV until they were moved around 1982 to the Irish McNeel Sports for Boys club, located on the Louisiana State Fairgrounds.

In the early 1980s, The Junkyard Dog would dominate as the company's top draw. He would also become overwhelming the most preferred local sports star who New Orleans schoolchildren wanted to meet, even more popular than big local New Orleans-based athletes Archie Manning and "Pistol" Pete Maravich, during the 1981-1982 academic year. In addition, he would also gain notoriety for being an African American who headlined a wrestling promotion at a time when African Americans in other promotions were billed as side acts.

Instead of the cartoon-ish characters and interviews common to the Hulkamania-era WWF, Mid-South Wrestling's content focused on: energetic matches performed before raucous and packed crowds; characters whose personas blurred the line between good and evil; an intensely physical, athletic wrestling style; and an episodic TV show format. The promotion ran shows in a mix of small venues and gigantic arenas. In 1980, a card pitting a "blinded" Junkyard Dog against Freebird Michael Hayes in the main event drew nearly 30,000 fans for a show presented by a promotion less than one year old. In 1984, Watts came out of retirement to team with a masked Junkyard Dog (under the name Stagger Lee) to face the Midnight Express to cap an angle in which the Express and manager Jim Cornette beat Watts on TV. Its undercard featured a showdown between Magnum T. A. and Mr. Wrestling II. The 1984 show drew 22,000 fans—an unimaginably large crowd for a regional territory show.

In the mid-1980s, MSW began to expand nationally. In 1985, longtime wrestling fan Ted Turner invited Watts to air MSW's weekly TV show on Turner's SuperStation TBS network. Turner wanted an alternative to the World Wrestling Federation show airing in the coveted 2-hour, Saturday-evening timeslot, which the WWF had acquired when it bought out the majority ownership of Georgia Championship Wrestling. (see: Black Saturday) Turner was angered by the WWF show because McMahon had promised him it would feature matches and promos taped in TBS' Atlanta studios (as Georgia Championship Wrestling had done for years). But instead of fresh, locally-produced content, the WWF's TBS show only presented clips and highlights from other WWF TV shows – some, depending on TV market, airing at the same time the TBS show did. (Eventually, the WWF would shoot local, in-studio matches, but only infrequently, and they were usually predictable squash matches.) MSW quickly became TBS' highest-rated show, so Watts positioned MSW to take over once Turner could force the WWF off his network. Watts' luck ran out, however, when former Georgia Championship Wrestling co-owner Jim Barnett helped broker a deal enabling North Carolina–based Jim Crockett Promotions' (led by Jim Crockett, Jr.) to buy the Saturday timeslot from McMahon, and become TBS' sole pro wrestling show. Watts made one more attempt at going national the following year. As part of that plan, Watts replaced Mid-South Wrestling's parochial brandname with a more corporate, ambitious (and WWF-like) one: the Universal Wrestling Federation.

=== Universal Wrestling Federation (1986–1987) ===
In March 1986, MSW "went national" (the goal of the most ambitious regional promotions of this era), re-launching as the Universal Wrestling Federation, and securing a syndication deal airing their two one-hour, weekly TV programs (the lesser show, Power Pro Wrestling debuted in 1984) in major markets across the United States. The TV tapings were also taken out of Shreveport and moved on location at various live shows throughout the Mid-South/UWF territory. New wrestlers, mostly from World Class Championship Wrestling (WCCW), joined the company, as did former WCCW co-promoter Ken Mantell.

Despite the UWF's strong early ratings and critical praise, it could not compete nationally with Jim Crockett Promotions (JCP) and the WWF, as both had stronger TV distribution and larger live event, pay-per-view (and, in the WWF's case, merchandise licensing) revenue streams. The UWF was further hurt when the oil-based economy of its richest local market—Oklahoma—fell into a severe recession in late 1986. This left the blue collar core of the UWF's fanbase with far less disposable income to spend on things like attending wrestling shows.

Watts sold the UWF to JCP on April 9, 1987, and many of the UWF's top stars were either retained by JCP, or immediately left for the WWF or WCCW. Unlike the other NWA-affiliated promotions JCP had bought out in the mid-1980s, the UWF did not immediately end; JCP kept its brand—and its three championships—alive in TV storylines until December 1987, when JCP's NWA-affiliated wrestlers defeated all of the UWF wrestlers in a series of "title vs. title" unification matches, among others. Only a few UWF wrestlers were well-received by JCP's fanbase; they included the Fabulous Freebirds, Shane Douglas, Rick Steiner, Eddie Gilbert, and UWF centerpiece "Dr. Death" Steve Williams. Most UWF imports were gone from JCP's roster within a year; however, one wrestler would go from UWF midcarder/tag team act, to breakout star in JCP, and the wrestling industry as a whole: Sting. (Sting's partner in the UWF tag team the Blade Runners would later become a WWF wrestling legend, too: Ultimate Warrior.)

In October 1988, JCP, one of the biggest and late stage casualties of the "going national" war with the WWF, sold its collection of territories and titles to Ted Turner's TBS. Turner re-branded JCP "World Championship Wrestling," naming the new company after its TBS TV show. Ironically, "Cowboy" Bill Watts ended up running the same business that had swallowed his own: In spring of 1992, WCW hired Watts as its latest Executive Vice President; he held the role less than a year.

World Wrestling Entertainment acquired most of the Mid-South/UWF video archive, absorbing it into its WWE Libraries collection in 2012—with a notable exception: Mid-South/UWF matches taped for Houston Wrestling which aired on KHTV in Houston. Those rights are held by the estate of Paul Boesch, who was the Houston territory's promoter. Select episodes of Mid-South are available for viewing on the WWE Network and on the NBCUniversal-owned Peacock streaming service in the United States.

== Storylines ==
The Battle of New Orleans was a long-playing brawl between Eddie Gilbert, Terry Taylor, Chris Adams and Sting, which began in the ring and spilled out into the concession area. Beer kegs, chairs, tables, popcorn machine and anything the four wrestlers could get their hands on were used in the brawl which lasted nearly 15 minutes. Sting and Gilbert fought outside the ring, when Rick Steiner came in and piledrived Shane Douglas. With Taylor on top, referee Randy Anderson made the pinfall. Later, Adams came out and told Anderson what had happened, which prompted Gilbert and Taylor to gang-up on Adams. Sting came in to even the sides, and that resulted in an all-out brawl outside the ring. Gilbert was the mastermind of this famous angle and received huge praise from fellow promoters and wrestlers.

Adams was engaged in a storyline involving Iceman King Parsons and Taylor, which evolved out of the UWF Tag Team Championship tournament in February 1987. Originally, Adams and Iceman were one of the eight teams participating, and Taylor was teamed with Sam Houston. In a semi-finals match, Adams and Iceman wrestled against "Dr Death" Steve Williams and Ted DiBiase until Skandor Akbar's Devastation Inc. charged the ring to attack Williams and DiBiase. The match ended when Williams and DiBiase were counted out, and Adams and Parsons won the match. Adams, who was helping Williams and DiBiase fight off Akbar and his army, wanted the match to continue, but Parsons wanted the win. After a lengthy argument, Adams and Parsons split, and Chris chose Savannah Jack as his new tag team partner. Iceman sucker-punched Savannah during a match and injured him, thus Adams had to choose another tag partner. He chose Terry Taylor, whose team lost a semi-final match to Rick Steiner and Sting. Taylor and Adams eventually won the UWF tag team titles, and held the belts for two months.

Meanwhile, Adams and Parsons engaged in a lengthy feud, which lasted for more than a decade (the two had feuded earlier in WCCW when Adams was the heel and Parsons was the babyface), with Parsons frequently referring to Adams as "Jailbird," a reference to Adams serving jail time in 1986 on an assault conviction. Taylor and Adams, who dominated the UWF tag team scene, lost a match to Steiner and Sting when Taylor kicked Adams foot off the rope as he was being pinned by Sting. A face-vs-face bout between Adams and Taylor marked Taylor's heel turn as he piledrived Adams on the floor. The Taylor-Adams war proved to be one of the most violent feuds in the UWF, with an equal intensity to the feud Adams had with the Von Erichs in World Class. The feud did have a short interruption when Taylor was injured in an automobile accident, but picked up again by the summer and carried over to World Class by 1988. Taylor and Adams promoted a famous angle in August which involved a press conference, where Taylor spoke about his situation with Adams and then left. Chris later took questions, which prompted Taylor to attack Adams with a chair. The following week, Adams conducted an interview vowing revenge against both Taylor and Eddie Gilbert.

Other famous UWF angles included promoter Bill Watts being attacked and having the flag of the Soviet Union draped on him by Eddie Gilbert, Missy Hyatt cold-cocking John Tatum after joining forces with Gilbert, Skandor Akbar throwing a fireball at Hacksaw Jim Duggan ("blinding" him temporarily), and the Freebirds breaking Steve Williams' arm. Williams recruited Oklahoma Sooners (and future Dallas Cowboys head coach) Barry Switzer into training and getting back into the ring. It paid off on July 11, 1987, when Dr. Death defeated Big Bubba Rogers (Ray Traylor) to win the UWF Heavyweight Championship. The Freebirds became faces around that time, as they began feuding with Skandor Akbar's army as well as The Angel of Death.

A prelim wrestler, Mike Boyette, wrestled in the UWF and is believed to be one of the very few wrestlers to never win a match. Video editors for the show even put together a music video of his various losses in the ring, set to the Little River Band song "Lonesome Loser". "Gorgeous" Gary Young also competed in the UWF, claiming that he was a rookie. He actually had five years experience under his belt. Young's claims prompted Jim Ross to begin referring to him as a "five-time rookie of the year."

As the UWF's merge with "the NWA" was taking place, Terry Taylor, who held the UWF Television Championship, began an angle with the NWA World Television Champion, Nikita Koloff. Taylor stole the NWA TV title belt during an NWA show, but Koloff (with help from Dusty Rhodes) reclaimed it before their official in-ring encounter. They met at Starrcade 1987, and Nikita unified the two titles as the final leg of the NWA-UWF merger was finished. Williams would successfully defend the UWF Heavyweight Title on the same show versus Barry Windham. Williams immediately left to do a series of lucrative performances in Japan; the title was retired while he was in Asia.

Sting, Rick Steiner, Eddie Gilbert, Missy Hyatt, announcer Jim Ross, Brad Armstrong and the aforementioned Taylor became permanent NWA roster members, among others. The Freebirds, Savannah Jack, Iceman King Parsons, matchmaker Frank Dusek, and promoter Ken Mantell joined the new Wild West Wrestling promotion, which later merged with World Class Championship Wrestling. "Gentleman" Chris Adams, who initially stayed with Jim Crockett Promotions post-UWF, left due to a money dispute and returned to World Class in November 1987. DiBiase, Big Bubba Rogers, One Man Gang, and Sam Houston joined the WWF, joining fellow UWF alumnus "Hacksaw Jim Duggan", who the WWF had signed in February 1987. The Sheepherders, who originally joined Crockett after the merger, left in mid-1988 for the WWF, where they were renamed the Bushwhackers. Terry Taylor also departed, appearing in World Class for a few months (feuding with Chris Adams and Kevin Von Erich), then the WWF in mid-1988 as The Red Rooster. Taylor would go on to have a long WWF/WWE career behind-the-scenes, holding various management and creative team roles.

== Former personnel ==
=== Announcers ===
Mid-South's main television broadcasting team included Bill Watts and Boyd Pierce, with KTBS-TV staff announcer Reisor Bowden serving as ring announcer. Jim Ross joined Mid-South after the closure of Leroy McGuirk's Tri-State promotion in Oklahoma, and remained through the transition to UWF. Bill Watts's son Joel Watts was later added to the Mid-South/UWF broadcasting team, and also worked behind-the-scenes as a producer of the TV program.

Following Jim Crockett Promotions' purchase of the UWF, both Bill and Joel Watts exited the promotion and Jim Ross was joined by various partners including Magnum T. A., Michael P.S. Hayes and Missy Hyatt. Veteran JCP announcer Bob Caudle became Ross's permanent partner near the closure of UWF. Frank Dusek and Toni Adams also served as ringside commentators during the course of its UWF tenure; both of whom moved on to World Class.

=== Wrestlers of NWA Tri-State/Mid-South/UWF ===
- Chris Adams
- Toni Adams
- Afa
- Skandor Akbar
- André the Giant
- Angel of Death
- Brad Armstrong
- Bill Ash
- The Assassin
- "Mr USA" Tony Atlas
- Ox Baker
- The Barbarian
- Jessie Barr
- Pat Barrett
- Black Bart
- Don Bass
- Brian Blair
- Tully Blanchard
- Nick Bockwinkel
- Mike Bond
- Matt Borne
- Mike Boyer
- Bruiser Brody
- Leroy Brown
- The Brute
- King Kong Bundy
- Ray Candy
- Coco Samoa
- Charlie Cook
- Wendell Cooley
- Tiger Conway Jr.
- Jim Cornette (Manager)
- Dennis Condrey
- Art Crews
- Dark Journey
- John Davidson
- Rick Davidson
- Ted DiBiase
- Shane Douglas
- Jim Duggan
- Bobby Duncum
- Frank Dusek
- Bobby Eaton
- Eli the Eliminator
- Paul Ellering
- Fishman
- Ric Flair
- The French Angel
- The Grappler
- The Grappler II
- "Gorgeous" Jimmy Garvin
- Mike George
- Robert Gibson
- Eddie Gilbert
- Terry "Bam Bam" Gordy
- "Crazy" Luke Graham
- The Great Kabuki
- Chavo Guerrero
- Hector Guerrero
- "Playboy" Garry Hart
- Stan "The Lariat" Hanson
- Freebird Michael "P. S." Hayes
- "Gorgeous" Gino Hernandez
- Hercules Hernandez (Hercules WWE)
- Tim Horner
- Mike Hudspeth
- Rock Hunter (wrestler turned manager)
- Missy Hyatt (Manager)
- The Iron Sheik
- Bill Irwin
- Savannah Jack
- Cactus Jack
- Don Jardine (The Spoiler)
- Junkyard Dog
- Leilani Kai
- Kamala
- Cajun Kenly
- Killer Khan
- King Cobra
- Krusher Khruschev
- Sonny King
- Kelly Kiniski
- "The Russian Bear" Ivan Koloff
- Nikita Koloff
- "Killer" Karl Kox
- Kortsia Korchenko
- "The Big Cat" Ernie Ladd
- Buddy Landel
- Charlie Lane
- Jose Lothario
- Arn Anderson
- Mad Dog Boyd
- Velvet McIntyre
- Dutch Mantel
- Judy Martin
- Mil Máscaras
- The Masked Superstar
- Hiro Matsuda
- Shawn Michaels
- Butch Miller
- The Missing Link
- The Mongolian Stomper
- Ricky Morton
- "King Kong" Mosca
- "Captain Redneck" Dick Murdoch
- Jim "The Anvil" Neidhart
- Mr. Olympia
- One Man Gang
- Paul Orndorff
- Bob Orton, Jr.
- Pork Chop Cash
- "Iceman" King Parsons
- Tank Patton
- Al Perez
- David Peterson
- "Leaping" Lanny Poffo
- Big John Quinn
- Tom Renesto jr
- Johnny "Crash" Rich
- Wendi Richter
- "Hacksaw" Butch Reed
- "The American Dream" Dusty Rhodes
- Buddy Roberts
- Jake Roberts
- Col. Buck Robley
- Blade Runner Rock
- Big Boss Man
- Bob Roop
- Billy Romeo
- Vinnie Romeo
- Nelson Royal
- The Russian Brute
- Brett Sawyer
- Buzz Sawyer
- Tom Shaft
- Sika
- "Iron" Mike Sharpe
- Dick Slater
- Vladic Smirnoff
- Snowman
- Bob Stabler
- Joe Stark
- Tom Statan
- Dennis Stamp
- Rick Steiner
- Sting
- Adrian Street
- Chief Jay Strongbow
- Big John Studd
- Sunshine
- The Super Destroyer
- Bob Sweetan
- Magnum T. A.
- "Hollywood" John Tatum
- Terry Taylor
- "Big" Tug Taylor
- Edcar Thomas
- Tony Torres
- The Turk
- "Handsome" Johnny Valentine
- Jack Victory
- Doug Vines
- Nikolai Volkoff
- Kerry Von Erich
- Koko B. Ware
- "Cowboy" Bill Watts
- Luke Williams
- "Dr. Death" Steve Williams
- Barry Windham
- Ed Wiskoski
- Mr. Wrestling II
- Yoshiaki Yatsu
- Gary Young
- Oliver Humperdink

=== Tag Teams and Stables ===
- The Fabulous Freebirds (Michael Hayes, Terry Gordy, and Buddy Roberts)
- The Samoan Warriors (Afa and Sika)
- Devastation Inc. (Skandor Akbar, The Samoan Warriors, One Man Gang, Killer Khan, Vladic Smirnoff, Savannah Jack, Leroy Brown, Ted DiBiase, Kamala, The Missing Link, and Bill Irwin )
- The Rat Pack (Ted DiBiase, Hacksaw Duggan, and Matt Borne)
- Ted DiBiase and Hacksaw Duggan
- Ted DiBiase and "Dr. Death" Steve Williams
- Ivan and Nikita Koloff
- The Lightning Express (Brad Armstrong and Tim Horner)
- Rock 'N Roll Express (Ricky Morton and Robert Gibson)
- The Jive Tones (Pez Whatley and Tiger Conway)
- The Midnight Express (Bobby Eaton and Dennis Condrey)
- Junkyard Dog and Dick Murdoch
- Junkyard Dog and Mr. Olympia
- Junkyard Dog and Killer Karl Kox
- The Sheepherders (Butch Miller and Luke Williams)
- Terry Taylor and Chris Adams
- The Blade Runners (Blade Runner Rock and Blade Runner Flash)
- Hot Stuff International, Inc. (Hot Stuff Eddie Gilbert, Rick Steiner, "Blade Runner" Rock, and "Blade Runner" Sting)
- H & H International, Inc. (Hot Stuff Eddie Gilbert, Missy Hyatt, Rick Steiner, Sting, and Jack Victory)
- John Tatum and Jack Victory
- The Bruise Brothers (Pork Chop Cash and Mad Dog Boyd)
- The Super Destroyer and The Grappler
- The Graplers (The Grappler and The Grappler #2)
- Mr. Wrestling II and Tiger Conway Jr
- Mr. Wrestling II and Col. Buck Robley
- One Man Gang and Killer Khan
- Hiro Matsuda and Yoshi Yatsu
- The Davidsons (Rick Davidson and John Davidson)
- "Hacksaw" Butch Reed and Jim "The Anvil" Neidhart
- The Pretty Young Things (Koko Ware and Norvell Austin)
- The Fantastics (Bobby Fulton and Tommy Rogers)

== Championships ==
=== NWA Tri-State ===
Championship:	Last Champion(s):	Date Active:	Date Retired:	Notes:
NWA World Heavyweight Championship	“Thrillbilly" Silas Mason	1948	Still active	As a member of the National Wrestling Alliance NWA Tri-State recognized the NWA World Heavyweight Championship as the highest title in the organization
NWA World Junior Heavyweight Championship	Alex Taylor	1945	Still active	As a member of the National Wrestling Alliance NWA Mid-America recognized the NWA World Junior Heavyweight Championship as the highest ranking junior heavyweight title in the organization
NWA Tri State North American Championship	Mr. Wrestling II	1969	1979	The title was renamed the Mid-South North American Championship when Bill Watts bought out most of the NWA Tri-State territory in 1979
NWA United States Tag Team Championship (Tri-State version)	Tommy Gilbert and Eddie Gilbert	September 22, 1963	1980	Was renamed the Tri-State Tag Team Championship in 1980 after Watts bought out most of the NWA Tri-State territory.
NWA United States Junior Heavyweight Championship (Tri-State version)	Jack Donovan	May 5, 1958	1960s	
NWA Tri-State Louisiana Championship	Mike George	1946 (NWA-Gulf Coast Wrestling)/1972 (NWA Tri-State Wrestling)	1979	The title was renamed the Mid-South Louisiana Championship when Bill Watts bought out most of the NWA Tri-State territory in 1979. Before 1972 the title was promoted by NWA Gulfcoast Louisiana until the 1960s
NWA Tri-State Heavyweight Championship	Bob Sweetan	September 7, 1980	1982	Title created after Bill Watts bought most of the NWA Tri-State territory, abandoned when Watts bought out the remaining Tri-State territory in 1982
NWA Tri-State Tag Team Championship	Turk Ali and El Toro	1980	1982	Title created after Bill Watts bought most of the NWA Tri-State territory, abandoned when Watts bought out the remaining Tri-State territory in 1982
NWA Tri-State Brass Knuckles Championship	Don Fargo	1970	1982	Title renamed after Bill Watts bought most of the NWA Tri-State territory, abandoned when Watts bought out the remaining Tri-State territory in 1982
NWA Louisiana Heavyweight Championship	Mike George	April 1978	August 1979	Tri-State recognized the Louisiana Heavyweight Championship between April, 1978 and August 1979 Title existed from 1964 until 1983
NWA Louisiana Tag Team Championship	Bill Watts and Buck Robley	April 14, 1959	1979	Title existed while Tri-State recognized the NWA Louisiana Heavyweight Championship

=== Mid-South Wrestling ===
Championship:	Last Champion(s):	Active From:	Active Till:	Notes:
NWA World Heavyweight Championship	“Thrillbilly" Silas Mason	1948	Still active	Despite not being a member of the National Wrestling Alliance, Mid-South recognized the NWA World Heavyweight Championship as the highest title in the organization
Mid-South North American Championship	"Hacksaw" Jim Duggan	1969	May 1986	Title was originally named the NWA Tri-State North American Championship but renamed when Bill Watts bought out most of the NWA Tri-State territory in 1979
Mid-South Television Championship	Dick Slater	May 2, 1984	1986	Title renamed "UWF Television Championship" in 1986
Mid-South Tag Team Championship	Ted DiBiase and Steve Williams	September 28, 1979	1986	Title renamed "UWF Tag Team Championship" in 1986
Mid-South Louisiana Championship	"Hacksaw" Jim Duggan	October 16, 1964	1983	Originally called the "NWA Tri-State Louisiana Heavyweight Championship", renamed after Bill Watts bought most of the NWA Tri-State territory

=== Universal Wrestling Federation ===
Championship:	Last Champion(s):	Active From:	Active Till:	Notes:
UWF Heavyweight Championship	"Dr. Death" Steve Williams	May 30, 1986	December 1987	Title replaced the "Mid-South North American Heavyweight Championship" when the promotion changed name
UWF Television Championship	Nikita Koloff	May 2, 1984	November 26, 1987	The "Mid-South Television Championship" was renamed when the promotion changed names
UWF Tag Team Championship	The Sheepherders	September 28, 1979	November 1987	The "Mid-South Tag Team Championship" was renamed when the promotion changed names
