= Eddie Gilbert (wrestler) =

American professional wrestler and booker (1961–1995)

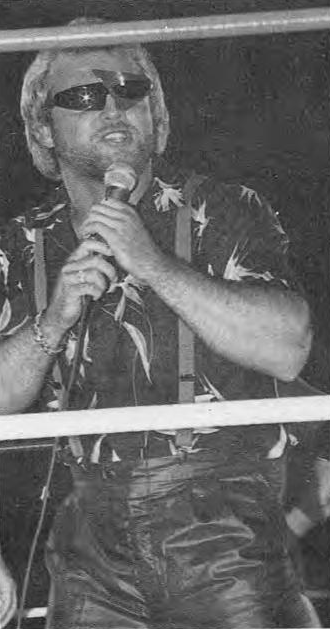
- Gilbert, c. 1986

Personal information
- Born: Thomas Edward Gilbert Jr. August 14, 1961 Lexington, Tennessee, U.S.
- Died: February 18, 1995 (aged 33) Isla Verde, Puerto Rico
- Cause of death: Heart attack
- Spouses: Missy Hyatt (m. 1987; div. 1989) Madusa (m. 1990; div. 1990)
- Family: Tommy Gilbert (father); Doug Gilbert (brother)

Professional wrestling career
- Ring name(s): The Boogie Man; Eddie Gilbert; Tommy Gilbert Jr.
- Billed height: 5 ft 10 in (178 cm)
- Billed weight: 222 lb (101 kg)
- Billed from: "Every girl's dream" Lexington, Tennessee
- Trained by: Tommy Gilbert
- Debut: 1977

Thomas Edward Gilbert Jr. (August 14, 1961 – February 18, 1995) better known by his ring name "Hot Stuff" Eddie Gilbert, was an American professional wrestler, and booker.

Gilbert started his wrestling career for the Continental Wrestling Association in 1977, using the ring name Tommy Gilbert Jr. and winning the AWA Southern Tag Team Championship with his father in 1980. He later moved to the World Wrestling Federation in 1982, working a storyline as the protégé of Bob Backlund until leaving the company in 1984. He found his greatest success in Memphis, teaming with Tommy Rich to form “Fargo’s Fabulous Ones” and winning the AWA Southern Tag Team Championship. Gilbert eventually turned heel and feuded with Rich as well as Jerry Lawler. He moved to Mid-South Wrestling (later the Universal Wrestling Federation) in 1985, where he wrestled and worked as a manager, forming the villainous stable “Hot Stuff International, Inc.”

In addition, Gilbert also worked as a booker in promotions like the Global Wrestling Federation and Eastern Championship Wrestling (later known as Extreme Championship Wrestling), while continuing to wrestle in various promotions including Jim Crockett Promotions and the United States Wrestling Association.

== Professional wrestling career ==
=== Early career (1977–1982) ===
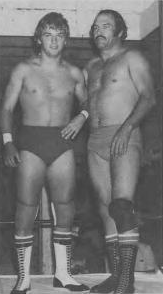
Eddie (left) and his father Tommy (right), c. 1982

Gilbert wanted to become a professional wrestler by the second grade, and wrote articles and took photographs for newsstand and ringside magazines as a way to become involved in the business. He was once rumored to have missed his own high school graduation so he could make it to Memphis to lose in the first match on the undercard at the Mid-South Coliseum. After graduating from high school, he made his debut in 1977 in the Memphis, Tennessee-based Continental Wrestling Association as "Tommy Gilbert Jr." in honor of his father, Tommy Gilbert. On February 10, 1979, he and Ricky Reed defeated Jake Dalton and Haiti Charlie. In 1980, he and his father won the AWA Southern Tag Team Championship.

=== World Wrestling Federation (1982–1984) ===
Gilbert debuted in the World Wrestling Federation in October 1982. After spending some time an enhancement talent, he was promoted to mid-card status. During this time period, he was touted as the protégé of then WWF Champion Bob Backlund. He also teamed with Curt Hennig for a brief time during this run.

In May 1983, Gilbert was seriously injured in a car accident, suffering severe injuries to his neck, arms, chest, and back. Some doctors told him he would never be able to wrestle again. His injuries were so severe that he needed plastic surgery, which Gilbert disguised by growing a beard.

Gilbert returned to the ring in August 1983. Upon his return, he stated on television that Bob Backlund had been a tremendous inspiration to him. At a September 1983 TV taping, Gilbert's neck was (in storyline) reinjured by the Masked Superstar who executed two neckbreakers to Gilbert in the ring to win a match and a third on the floor ringside afterwards, resulting in Gilbert being stretchered from the ring and taken away in an ambulance. Gilbert continued wrestling for the WWF until March 1984.

=== Continental Wrestling Association (1984–1986) ===
Later, he began making a name for himself as Eddie Gilbert for the CWA in Memphis, Tennessee. He teamed with his father and Ricky Morton over the following years. In addition, he formed a team with Tommy Rich as "Fargo's Fabulous Ones", an attempt by CWA (Memphis) to bury and still cash in on the fame attained by the previous incarnation of the Fabulous Ones, Steve Keirn and Stan Lane, who walked out of the territory after a dispute. They held the AWA Southern Tag Team titles in 1984 until dropping them to Phil Hickerson and the Spoiler (Frank Morrell). The duo would break up soon after, with Gilbert turning heel in the process. The two had a brief but intense feud, which memorably began on television when the two were presented with a "Tag Team of the Year" award by announcer Lance Russell and two guests. Gilbert, unaware his former partner was at the taping, badmouthed Rich, then the International Heavyweight Champion, until Rich came out to confront him. Rich immediately got the upper hand, running Gibert into the steel ringpost several times, bloodying him in the process before the cameras went to a commercial. After the commercial break, Gilbert told Russell he wanted Rich to come back out so he could apologize to him in person, stating he was wrong for still being bitter about the break-up of the team, and was fueled by jealousy of Rich's championship title reign and newfound star status. When Rich accepted Gilbert's apology, Gilbert suddenly turned on him and, in front of a stunned audience and a speechless Russell, rammed Rich's head into the ringpost, just as Rich had done to him moments earlier.

=== Mid-South Wrestling (1985–1987) ===
In 1985, Gilbert went to work for Bill Watts' Mid-South Wrestling promotion. Adopting the nickname "Hot Stuff", he started a heel stable of wrestlers called "Hot Stuff International, Inc.", consisting of Blade Runner Sting, Blade Runner Rock, and Rick Steiner. He stole Missy Hyatt from John Tatum in 1986, with his stable being renamed "H & H International, Inc." Iceman Parsons and Dick Murdoch would also join his stable later on at different times as well. Sting would eventually leave the stable upon turning face and feud with them. Eddie also worked as a booker, who came up with the famous Battle of New Orleans angle in late-1987 involving Chris Adams, Terry Taylor, Sting, and himself. Following a match in which Taylor defeated Shane Douglas due to interference by both Gilbert and Rick Steiner, Adams told referee Randy Anderson of the interference. As Adams pleaded his case with Anderson, Gilbert and Taylor attacked him, and Sting eventually evened the sides. The angle eventually spilled outside the ring into the stands, and near the concession area, featuring a huge brawl involving beer kegs, chairs, trash cans, tables, popcorn machines and other objects. Gilbert was awarded Best Booker of 1988 by the Wrestling Observer Newsletter. He would stay with the UWF until its purchase by Jim Crockett Promotions in April 1987.

=== Jim Crockett Promotions / NWA World Championship Wrestling (1987–1990) ===
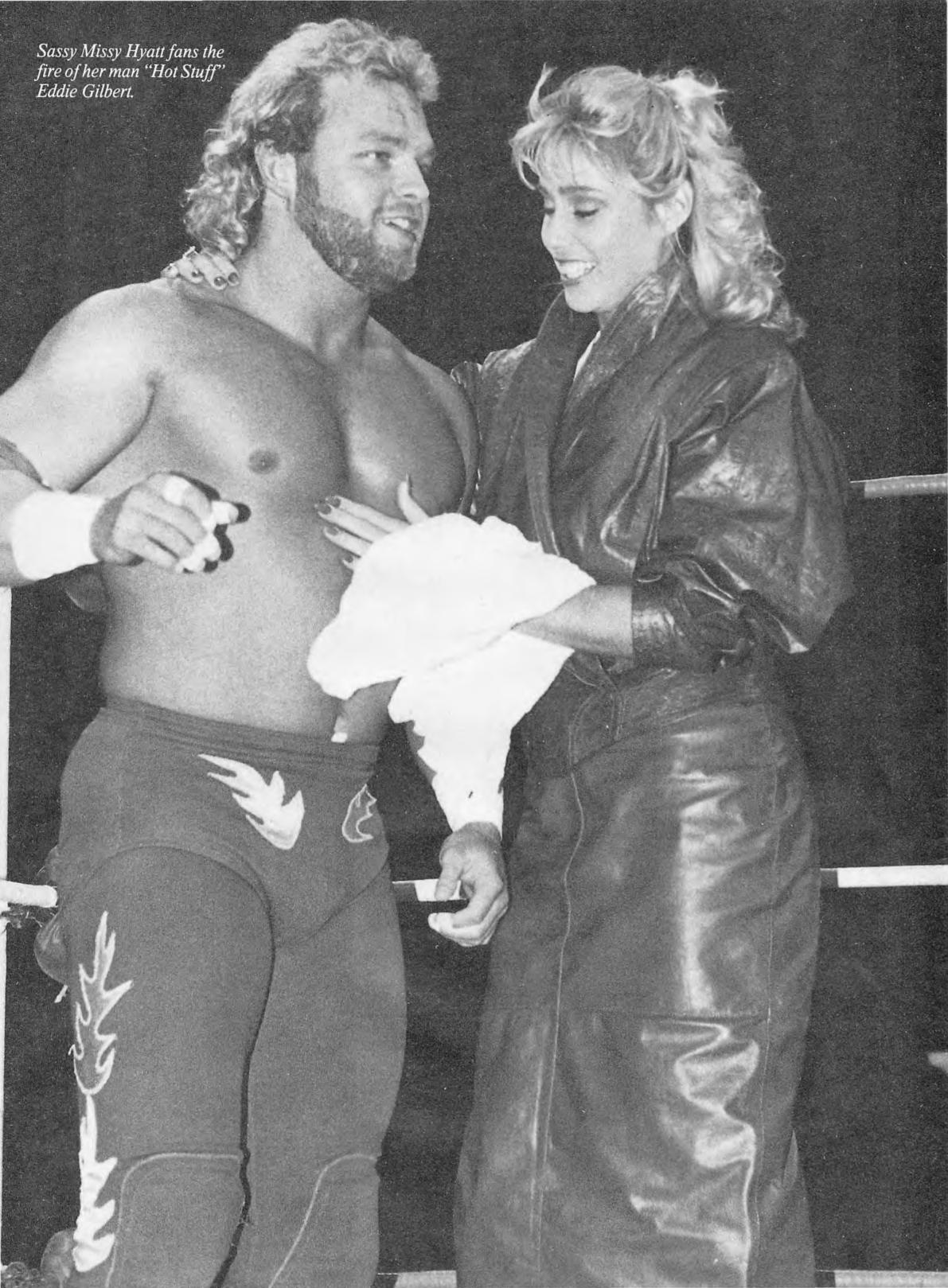
Gilbert (left) and Missy Hyatt in 1987

In May 1987, Gilbert began wrestling for Jim Crockett Promotions (JCP), which had purchased the UWF. He brought Hyatt, Heyman and his brother Doug Gilbert with him. Eddie teamed with Rick Steiner as the "First Family" to feud with Kevin Sullivan and his Varsity Club. He also became involved in a feud with Ric Flair and Barry Windham in which he teamed with Ricky Steamboat and Lex Luger. Gilbert was told at one point that he would be a member of the Four Horsemen, which he considered would be the pinnacle of his career, but this did not happen. Near the end of his stint there, JCP was renamed World Championship Wrestling (WCW). Gilbert left WCW in April 1990.

=== Continental Wrestling Federation (1988) ===
In May 1988, Gilbert began working for Alabama's Continental Wrestling Federation (CWF), where he reformed Hot Stuff Inc. Gilbert also served as booker, with Paul Heyman as his assistant. The CWF was broadcast nationally on the Financial News Network, and Gilbert's creative work was widely praised by wrestling journalists. Gilbert left the CWF in September 1988 due to conflicts with management.

=== Various promotions (1990–1993) ===
Gilbert left WCW in April 1990 and also divorced Hyatt. He went back to the independents where he could book again. He worked for the United States Wrestling Association (USWA) in Memphis (where he feuded with Jerry Lawler) and the Global Wrestling Federation (GWF), as well as Philadelphia's Tri-State Wrestling Alliance promotion. Gilbert's most famous feud in the Memphis territory involved an angle between himself and Lawler in September 1990. Eddie and his brother Doug were "fired" from the promotion, and in retaliation hit Lawler with their car and fled the scene. Numerous home viewers, fearing for Lawler, immediately called the police to report what they had just seen as a legitimate vehicular assault. Lawler had to inform the police what was going on and Lawler was forced to appear on television (while selling his "injuries") sooner than intended out of concern that Gilbert would have been legitimately arrested if he did not show on TV that he was all right.

Gilbert quit the USWA in January 1991. The on air story was that he had chosen to leave the promotion rather than be injured by Jim Cornette and The Fabulous Ones. Due to a pay dispute, Gilbert, along with his brother Doug (who wrestled under a mask as the Dark Patriot) left the GWF in 1992.

In September 1991, Gilbert toured Japan with W*ING. During the tour, he primarily teamed with Tom Prichard against teams such as the Headhunters and Koichiro Kimura and Yukihiro Kanemura. He returned to W*ING in November 1993, this time wrestling as "the Boogie Man" and teaming with Leatherface.

=== NWA Eastern Championship Wrestling (1993) ===
In 1993, Gilbert wrestled for NWA Eastern Championship Wrestling, where he again teamed with Doug. He also served as head booker for nearly six months, but gave up his position in September 1993 to Paul Heyman. At one point, Gilbert owned 49% of the company. Heyman would take the company in an even more extreme direction, and under the name Extreme Championship Wrestling just 11 months later which saw the company depart the NWA in controversial fashion. Due to ECW's notoriety under Heyman, the company quickly became the third biggest wrestling company in North America behind the WWF and WCW.

=== Late career (1993–1995) ===
Eddie Gilbert took with him the GWF North American Heavyweight Championship belt. He made a few defenses of the title in the USWA as the GWF World Heavyweight champion, despite being stripped of the belt and not being recognized as such by the GWF. Gilbert returned to the USWA until early 1995 when he worked one night for Smoky Mountain Wrestling before traveling to World Wrestling Council in Puerto Rico to wrestle and book. His last wrestling match was against a bear.

== Personal life ==
Gilbert's first marriage was to a woman named Terrie Bardwell Dykes. The two divorced, and Gilbert married wrestling valet Missy Hyatt in October 1987 and they divorced in 1989. Gilbert was also briefly married to Debrah "Madusa" Miceli in 1990, but the marriage only lasted four months.

In early 1994, Gilbert filmed a shoot interview with Bob Barnett titled "Looking For Mr. Gilbert." Gilbert spoke openly about his life and career at a time when professional wrestlers rarely appeared on film out of character and almost never spoke publicly about the behind-the-scenes machinations of the wrestling business. The footage from the interview was later marketed on home video and sold through wrestling newsletters, as well as at independent wrestling shows, the first of its kind. "Looking For Mr. Gilbert" is now considered the first professional wrestling "shoot video", and in the decades since, countless professional wrestlers have conducted sit-down shoot interviews.

== Death ==
On February 18, 1995, Gilbert died of a massive heart attack in his sleep at his apartment in Isla Verde, Puerto Rico. His body was found by Ken Wayne. Gilbert's father, Tommy Gilbert, stated that injuries to Eddie's chest and heart muscle had occurred in a serious car crash in 1983 and could have been a factor. The Eddie Gilbert Memorial Brawl was held in his memory from 1996 to 1999.

== Championships and accomplishments ==
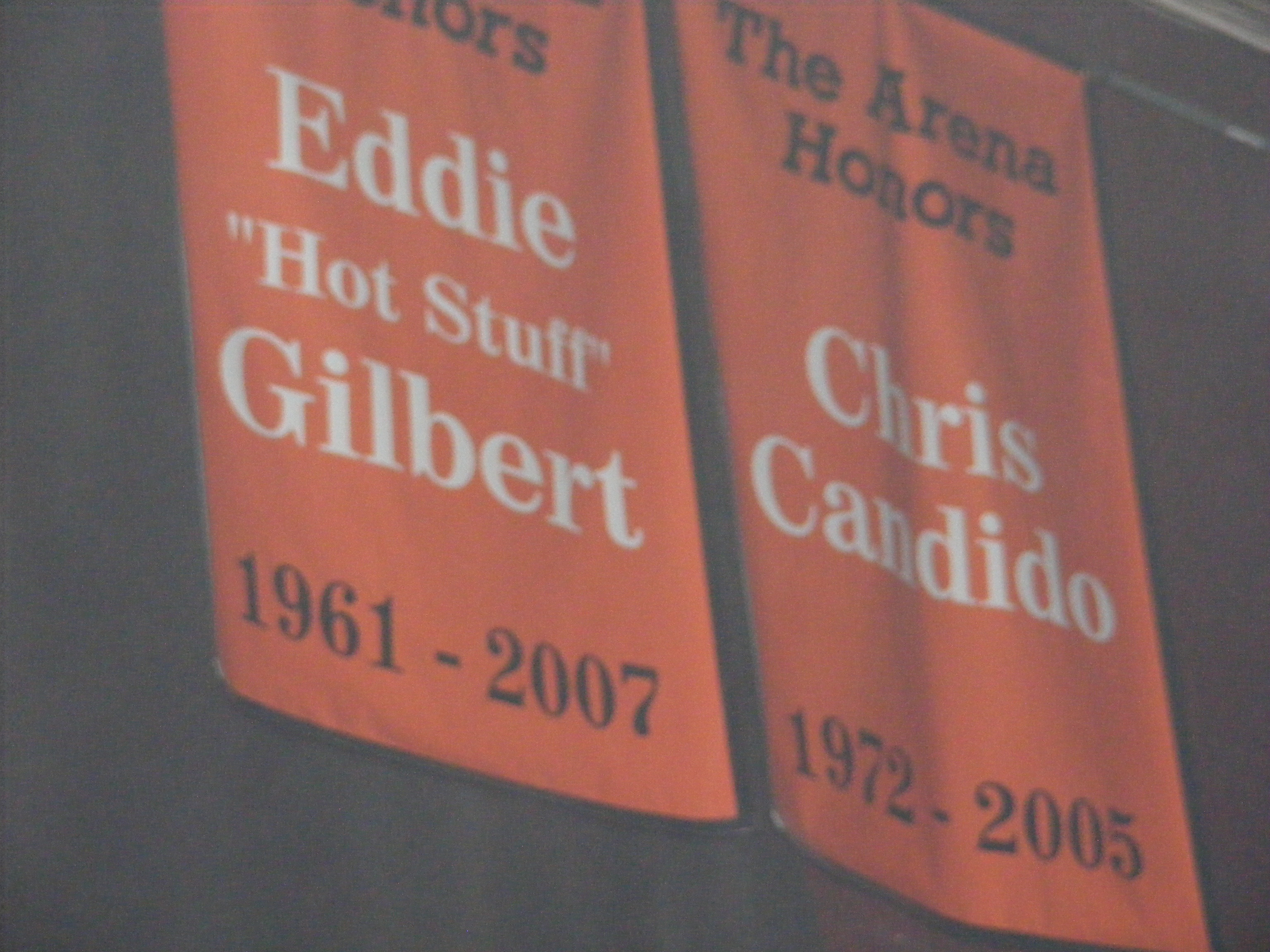
Gilbert's Hardcore Hall of Fame banner in the former ECW Arena.

- Cauliflower Alley Club
  - Family Award (2011) – with Doug Gilbert and Tommy Gilbert
- Central States Wrestling
  - NWA Central States Tag Team Championship (1 time) – with Ricky Romero
- Continental Wrestling Association
  - AWA Southern Heavyweight Championship (1 time)
  - AWA Southern Tag Team Championship (4 times) – with Tommy Gilbert (2), Tommy Rich (1), and Ricky Morton (1)
  - CWA International Heavyweight Championship (2 times)
- Eastern Championship Wrestling
  - ECW Tag Team Championship (1 time) – with Dark Patriot
  - ECW Tag Team Championship Tournament (1993) – with Dark Patriot
- Global Wrestling Federation
  - GWF North American Heavyweight Championship (1 time)
  - GWF Television Championship (2 times)
  - GWF Television Championship Tournament (October 1991)
- Hardcore Hall of Fame
  - Class of 2009
- Indie Wrestling Hall of Fame
  - Class of 2024
- Jim Crockett Promotions
  - NWA United States Tag Team Championship (1 time) – with Rick Steiner
- Memphis Wrestling Hall of Fame
  - Class of 2017
- NWA Tri-State / Mid-South Wrestling Association / Universal Wrestling Federation
  - Mid-South Tag Team Championship (1 time) - with The Nightmare
  - NWA Tri-State Tag Team Championship (3 times) – with Ricky Morton (1), and Tommy Gilbert (2)
  - NWA United States Tag Team Championship (Tri-State version) (1 time) – with Tommy Gilbert
  - UWF World Tag Team Championship (2 times) – with Sting
  - UWF World Television Championship (1 time)
- Pro Wrestling Illustrated
  - PWI ranked him #83 of the top 500 singles wrestlers of the "PWI Years" in 2003
- United States Wrestling Association
  - USWA Heavyweight Championship (1 time)
  - USWA Southern Heavyweight Championship (1 time)
  - USWA Tag Team Championship (1 time) – with Brian Christopher
  - USWA Unified World Heavyweight Championship (4 times)
  - GWF World Heavyweight Championship (actually GWF North American Championship brought over to USWA)
  - Memphis Wrestling Hall of Fame (Class of 1995)
- World Wrestling Council
  - WWC North American Tag Team Championship (1 time) – with Tommy Gilbert
- Wrestling Observer Newsletter
  - Most Disgusting Promotional Tactic (1983) Broken neck angle
  - Best Booker (1988)

== See also ==
- List of premature professional wrestling deaths
