= Dick Slater =

American professional wrestler (1951–2018)

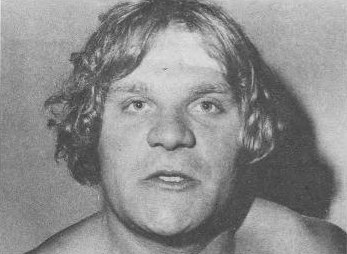
- Slater, circa 1977

Personal information
- Born: Richard Van Slater; May 19, 1951 Albany, New York, U.S.
- Died: October 18, 2018 (aged 67) Largo, Florida, U.S.
- Education: University of Tampa

Professional wrestling career
- Ring name(s): Dick Slater; Mr. Florida
- Billed height: 6 ft 0 in (1.83 m)
- Billed weight: 233 lb (106 kg)
- Trained by: Hiro Matsuda; Eddie Graham
- Debut: May 1972
- Retired: October 1996

Richard Van Slater (May 19, 1951 – October 18, 2018) better known by his ring name "Dirty" Dick Slater, was an American professional wrestler who wrestled in the 1970s, 1980s, and mid-1990s for various promotions including Mid-Atlantic Championship Wrestling and World Championship Wrestling (WCW).

Slater began wrestling with Mike Graham at Robinson High School, in Tampa, Florida. He attended the University of Tampa with Paul Orndorff. From there he began wrestling in Championship Wrestling from Florida and Georgia Championship Wrestling. He worked as a booker in Knoxville, Tennessee after Ron Fuller sold his promotion to Jim Barnett. He wrestled in Mid-Atlantic Championship Wrestling (later World Championship Wrestling), where he appeared on the first Starrcade. He also worked in Mid-South Wrestling Association, where he was managed by Dark Journey. Slater made some trips to the World Wrestling Council in Puerto Rico. He wrestled briefly in the World Wrestling Federation as a babyface under a "Rebel" gimmick, but soon returned to WCW. He wrestled there until receiving his back injury that ended his career.

In June 2004, Slater was convicted for the stabbing of his former girlfriend Theresa Halbert. He was sentenced to one year of house arrest and two years of probation. He blamed the incident on influence of painkillers.

== Early life ==
Slater began wrestling in 1968 with Mike Graham at Thomas Richard Robinson High School in Tampa, Florida. Eddie Graham purchased a wrestling mat for his high school and started a high school wrestling program there. He wrestled in the Amateur Athletic Union (AAU), a program that trained young wrestlers to go to the Olympics.

Slater went to the University of Tampa, where he played football in addition to wrestling (among his teammates were John Matuszak and Paul Orndorff). He had a chance to play football for the Miami Dolphins but declined the opportunity, deciding to wrestle instead. After going to a national AAU meet, he was approached by Mike Graham, who asked him if he wanted to become a professional wrestler; Slater decided to go to the Tampa Sportatorium to train as a professional wrestler. There, he was trained by Jack Brisco, Bob Roop, Hiro Matsuda, and Bill Watts. Slater also became good friends with Dick Murdoch around this time.

== Professional wrestling career ==
=== Championship Wrestling from Florida (1972–1975) ===
Slater debuted in 1972 with Championship Wrestling from Florida, which was run by Eddie Graham. He stayed there for three years and won the NWA Florida Tag Team Championship (with Dusty Rhodes, Stan Vachon, Toru Tanaka, and Johnny Weaver) and the NWA Florida Television Championship.

=== Georgia Championship Wrestling (1972–1983) ===
After leaving CWF, Slater worked in California alongside The Von Brauners, Moondog Mayne, Pat Patterson, and Ray Stevens. From there, he went to Las Vegas and Reno, Nevada (traveling with Moondog Mayne frequently). Slater then went to Georgia Championship Wrestling, an organization he credits with putting him on the map. He worked there for 8 years, winning the NWA Georgia Heavyweight Championship four times, as well as the NWA Georgia Tag Team Championship and NWA Macon Tag Team Championship with Bob Orton, Jr. During the time period he also won the NWA Missouri Heavyweight Championship and a number of Florida titles. Slater commented that after winning the Missouri Heavyweight Title, he was in the mix to become NWA World Heavyweight Champion, but would attribute his not winning it to "politics".

=== Mid-Atlantic Championship Wrestling (1983–1985) ===
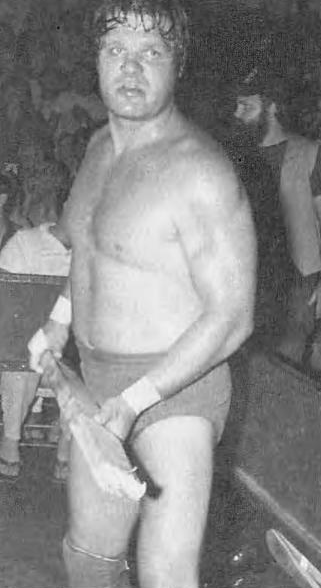
Slater, circa 1984

In 1983, Slater was working in Knoxville, Tennessee for Ron Fuller when Jim Barnett approached Slater with the idea of booking a television show in Atlanta for Ted Turner. At the same time, Jim Crockett was buying out Jim Barnett; thus, Slater started working for Crockett. Around the same time, Dusty Rhodes (one of Slater's many tag team partners) became a booker for Crockett. Slater teamed up with Bob Orton, Jr., and began a feud with Ric Flair where they attacked with an aided piledriver in an attempt to end his career. The team collected a bounty from Harley Race, the reigning NWA World Heavyweight Champion for apparently ending Flair's career. Flair would return and attack Slater and Orton. While Flair would go on to fight Race at Starrcade for the championship, Orton and Slater were placed in a tag team match with Mark Youngblood and Wahoo McDaniel, who sought retribution on Slater and Orton for attacking their friend Flair. At the event, Slater and Orton were victorious over Youngblood and McDaniel after Orton superplexed Youngblood.

Slater has said that Crockett ran one of the hardest promotions to work for; in addition to wrestling for Crockett, Slater was also booking three other promotions, Bill Watts’, Joe Blanchard’s, and Paul Boesch's. For a time in Mid-Atlantic, Slater was managed by Gary Hart. While in Mid-Atlantic, Slater won the NWA Mid-Atlantic Heavyweight Championship, the NWA Television Championship and the NWA United States Heavyweight Championship He also independently declared himself the true NWA World Heavyweight Champion during Flair's title reign, creating his own belt, and was involved in another program with Flair.

=== Mid-South Wrestling Association (1985–1986) ===
In 1985, Slater left Mid-Atlantic and went to Mid-South Wrestling (run by Bill Watts). He has said that the move was because he was tired of the promotion and the multiple bookings he did. In Mid-South, Slater took on his controversial valet of Dark Journey, whom he first saw dancing at a strip club; he eventually asked her to be his valet. His relationship with her caused a great deal of legitimate heat (due to her being African-American). While in Mid-South, Slater engaged in a lengthy feud with Jake Roberts (who would DDT Dark Journey in one of their matches); Slater would also win the Mid-South North American Championship, the Mid-South Television Championship, and the UWF World Television Championship.

=== World Wrestling Federation (1986–1987) ===
Slater wrestled briefly for the World Wrestling Federation (WWF) as a babyface using a Southern "Rebel" gimmick. He debuted in WWF on the July 26, 1986 episode of Championship Wrestling by defeating The Gladiator. While in the WWF, Slater had one match with Jake Roberts; however, this being 1980s WWF TV (where no mention was ever made of a wrestler's past) his Mid-South feud with Roberts was ignored. In that match, aired on a December 13, 1986 episode of WWF Superstars, Slater cleanly pinned Roberts but decision was reversed by referee Danny Davis when Roberts put his foot on the rope after the three count. Slater was then disqualified for hitting the referee. Slater defeated Mike Sharpe at The Big Event and was squashed by Don Muraco in two minutes on the Saturday Night's Main Event VIII. Shortly after his match with Muraco, the WWF began to use him as a jobber. His last televised appearance in WWF was on the May 4, 1987 episode of Prime Time Wrestling, where he lost to Butch Reed.

=== All Japan Pro Wrestling (1987–1990) ===
After departing WWF, Slater toured All Japan Pro Wrestling on numerous occasions between 1987 and 1990. He teamed with Tommy Rich to participate in the 1988 Real World Tag League for the vacant World Tag Team Championship but the duo lost all of their matches in the tournament. On May 13, 1989, Slater and Danny Spivey unsuccessfully challenged Jumbo Tsuruta and Yoshiaki Yatsu for the World Tag Team Championship. Later that year, Slater formed a tag team with Joel Deaton. The duo participated in the 1990 Real World Tag League to crown the new World Tag Team Champions and won only two matches by defeating the teams of Doug Furnas and Ricky Santana and Mighty Inoue and Rusher Kimura.

=== American Wrestling Association (1987) ===
Slater had a brief run in the American Wrestling Association (AWA) where he was supposedly a bodyguard for AWA champion Curt Hennig.

=== World Championship Wrestling (1989–1996) ===
==== J-Tex Corporation; Hardliners (1989–1991) ====
Slater returned to Jim Crockett Promotions, then renamed World Championship Wrestling on the August 26, 1989 episode of World Championship Wrestling as a member of J-Tex Corporation, facing Sting in a match, which he lost by disqualification after his J-Tex teammates Terry Funk and The Great Muta attacked Sting. The group primarily feuded with Ric Flair and Sting. He replaced an injured Terry Funk to team up with The Great Muta at Clash of the Champions VIII in a losing effort against Ric Flair and Sting. The match ended in a disqualification after Terry Funk placed a plastic bag over Ric Flair's head. Slater was fired by WCW. However, he would come back to WCW for the final portion of his career in 1991.

Slater returned to WCW in the summer of 1991 and formed a tag team with Dick Murdoch called the Hardliners. Hardliners debuted as a team on Clash of the Champions XV, by attacking Steiner Brothers, Hiroshi Hase and Masahiro Chono after an IWGP Tag Team Championship match between the two teams. Hardliners' first match as a team took place on the June 29 episode of WorldWide by defeating enhancement talents Mike Jackson and Tim Parker. Hardliners began a rivalry with Steiner Brothers but Scott suffered an injury and they wrestled Rick and his different tag team partners throughout the summer of 1991. Hardliners participated in a tournament for the vacated World Tag Team Championship, in which they wrestled The Fabulous Freebirds (Jimmy Garvin and Michael Hayes) to a double count-out in the first round on the July 27 episode of World Championship Wrestling. The team disbanded in the fall of 1991 and Slater competed in the Florida-based International Championship Wrestling Alliance (ICWA) for the rest of 1991.

==== United States Tag Team Champion (1992) ====
On the July 4 episode of Saturday Night, Slater returned to WCW television by teaming with Greg Valentine to defeat Marcus Alexander Bagwell and Big Josh. Slater would then form an alliance with Valentine and The Barbarian. Later that night, Slater and Barbarian challenged The Fabulous Freebirds (Jimmy Garvin and Michael Hayes) to a match for the United States Tag Team Championship, which took place on the July 12 episode of Main Event, with Slater and Barbarian defeating Fabulous Freebirds to win the United States Tag Team Championship and becoming the final holders of the title as it was retired on July 31. At Clash of the Champions XX, Slater and Valentine lost to the team of Arn Anderson and Bobby Eaton. Slater and Valentine competed in the tag team division for the rest of 1992 before splitting up and Slater began competing as a singles competitor.

==== Stud Stable (1993–1996) ====
Slater returned to WCW in 1993 as the injured Paul Orndorff's replacement against Ron Simmons in a match at Clash of the Champions XXIII, which Slater lost. Slater mainly competed as an enhancement talent for the rest of 1993 and most of 1994. On the December 3, 1994 episode of Saturday Night, Slater replaced Terry Funk in Col. Robert Parker's group Stud Stable. Slater was placed in a tag team with Stud Stable teammate Bunkhouse Buck and the group started a feud with Harlem Heat because of a love/hate relationship between Parker and the Heat's manager, Sister Sherri. Slater and Buck faced Harlem Heat in a losing effort at The Great American Bash. On the July 22 episode of Saturday Night, Slater and Buck defeated Harlem Heat to win the World Tag Team Championship due to an interference from Col. Rob Parker. After winning the titles, Slater and Buck feuded with teams such as the Nasty Boys and Stars n Stripes. At Clash of the Champions XXXI, Slater, Buck and Parker lost a match to Harlem Heat and Sister Sherri, resulting in Harlem Heat getting a title shot at Slater and Buck's World Tag Team Championship at Fall Brawl, where Slater and Buck dropped the titles back to Harlem Heat. Parker then dumped Slater and Buck for Sister Sherri.

Slater and Buck continued to perform in the tag team division without Parker. At World War 3, Slater participated in the inaugural namesake match for the vacant World Heavyweight Championship, which Randy Savage won. After continuing to lose matches, Buck eventually abandoned Slater during a match against The American Males on the March 2, 1996 episode of Saturday Night, leading to Slater losing the handicap match to American Males, thus marking the end of the Stud Stable. On the March 30 episode of Saturday Night, Slater unsuccessfully challenged Ric Flair for the World Heavyweight Championship.

==== Rough n Ready (1996) ====
Slater reunited with Col. Robert Parker in mid-1996. At Slamboree, Slater and Earl Robert Eaton defeated Alex Wright and Disco Inferno in a Lethal Lottery match and then defeated Jim Duggan and VK Wallstreet in the second match of the Lethal Lottery to qualify for the Battlebowl battle royal to determine the #1 contender for the World Heavyweight Championship at The Great American Bash. Diamond Dallas Page won the Battlebowl to earn the title shot. Shortly after, Slater formed a tag team with Mike Enos called Rough 'n' Ready. The two began teaming with each other on the July 6 episode of Saturday Night, where they were paired with VK Wallstreet against Lex Luger, Sting and Randy Savage in a losing effort. Rough n Ready lost the majority of their matches but received five opportunities against Harlem Heat for the World Tag Team Championship on WCW television during the next two months but failed to win the title. In Gainesville, Georgia, Slater blew out two vertebrae during a match in October 1996. The back injury ended his wrestling career and his run with Enos.

== Personal life ==
Slater had four brothers, George, Russell, James and Carl Slater. He had four half-sisters, Nancy, Donna, Sandra and Catherine Slater. He had one daughter.

By 2003, Slater began using a wheelchair after a number of back surgeries. In June 2004, Slater was convicted of attacking his then-girlfriend, Theresa Halbert. On December 27, 2003, it was reported that Slater had stabbed Halbert with a butcher's knife. Slater claimed that the night before the incident, he had received "a shot of morphine and two forty milligram Oxycontins" at an emergency room, related to his numerous back injuries. In an interview with Mid-Atlantic Gateway, Slater said that "It was all drug related ... most of it all. I mean, I couldn’t tell you what happened ... if I didn’t know what happened...I really don’t know what actually took place, other than I was ... I woke up in Intensive Care in the hospital. I had gone to the hospital by ambulance the night before ... ". On June 10, 2004, Slater was sentenced to one year of house arrest and two years of probation. He was also sentenced to keep away from Halbert and pay more than $18,000 restitution.

Before coming to Mid-Atlantic Championship Wrestling, Slater was involved in an incident where Wahoo McDaniel shot him. Slater, McDaniel, Tommy Rich, and André the Giant were at a bar in Atlanta when someone in the bar made a comment about Rich's wife, which angered Rich and McDaniel. The man who had commented about Rich's wife got a knife, and seeing that, McDaniel got out a gun. André and Slater went out to the parking lot and watched the altercation; while they were watching McDaniel pistol-whip the man, the gun went off and Slater was hit by the bullet in the leg. Slater told the police that a sniper had shot him; he would return to the ring in just three weeks. Slater was also famous for an altercation in a bar in Tampa, Florida with John Matuszak, which Slater won.

== Death ==
WWE released a statement on October 18, 2018, announcing that Slater had died. Wrestling trainer and close friend Les Thatcher acknowledged that Slater had died on his Twitter account. His death was also confirmed by on-screen adversary Ric Flair, who paid tribute on YouTube. According to the NWA's Twitter account, Slater died due to heart complications.

== Championships and accomplishments ==
- All Japan Pro Wrestling
  - Champion Carnival Technical Award (1979)
  - World's Strongest Tag Determination League Outstanding Performance Award (1980) – with Ricky Steamboat
  - World's Strongest Tag Determination League Fair Play Award (1980) – with Ricky Steamboat
  - World's Strongest Tag Determination League Technique Award (1982) – with Harley Race
  - World's Strongest Tag Determination League Excite Award (1990) – with Joel Deaton
- Championship Wrestling from Florida
  - NWA Brass Knuckles Championship (Florida version) (1 time)
  - NWA Florida Heavyweight Championship (2 times)
  - NWA Florida Tag Team Championship (4 times) – with Dusty Rhodes (1), Stan Vachon (1), Toru Tanaka (1), and Johnny Weaver (1)
  - NWA Florida Television Championship (2 times)
  - NWA Southern Heavyweight Championship (Florida version) (4 times)
  - NWA United States Tag Team Championship (Florida version) (1 time) – with Killer Karl Kox
- Georgia Championship Wrestling
  - NWA Georgia Heavyweight Championship (4 times)
  - NWA Macon Heavyweight Championship (2 times)
  - NWA Georgia Tag Team Championship (1 time) – with Bob Orton Jr.
  - NWA Macon Tag Team Championship (1 time) – with Bob Orton Jr.
- International Wrestling Association of Japan
  - IWA World Heavyweight Championship (1 time)
- Mid-Atlantic Championship Wrestling / World Championship Wrestling
  - NWA United States Heavyweight Championship (1 time)
  - NWA Mid-Atlantic Heavyweight Championship (1 time)
  - NWA Television Championship (2 times)
  - WCW United States Tag Team Championship (1 time) – with The Barbarian
  - NWA (Mid-Atlantic)/WCW World Tag Team Championship (2 times) – with Dusty Rhodes (1) and Bunkhouse Buck (1)
- Mid-South Wrestling Association / Universal Wrestling Federation
  - Mid-South North American Championship (2 times)
  - Mid-South Television Championship (1 time)
  - UWF World Television Championship (1 time)
- Pro Wrestling Illustrated
  - Ranked No. 86 of the top 500 singles wrestlers in the PWI 500 in 1992
- Southeastern Championship Wrestling
  - NWA Southeastern Heavyweight Championship (Northern Division) (3 times)
  - NWA Southeastern Tag Team Championship (2 times) – with Jerry Blackwell (1) and Paul Orndorff (1)
- Southwest Championship Wrestling
  - SCW Southwest Heavyweight Championship (2 times)
  - SCW Southwest Tag Team Championship (1 time) – with Bob Sweetan
  - SCW World Tag Team Championship (1 time) – with Bruiser Brody
- St. Louis Wrestling Club
  - NWA Missouri Heavyweight Championship (1 time)
- United States Wrestling Association
  - USWA Southern Heavyweight Championship (1 time)
- Wrestling Observer Newsletter
  - Worst Tag Team (1995) with Bunkhouse Buck
