= Terry Taylor =

American professional wrestler (born 1955)

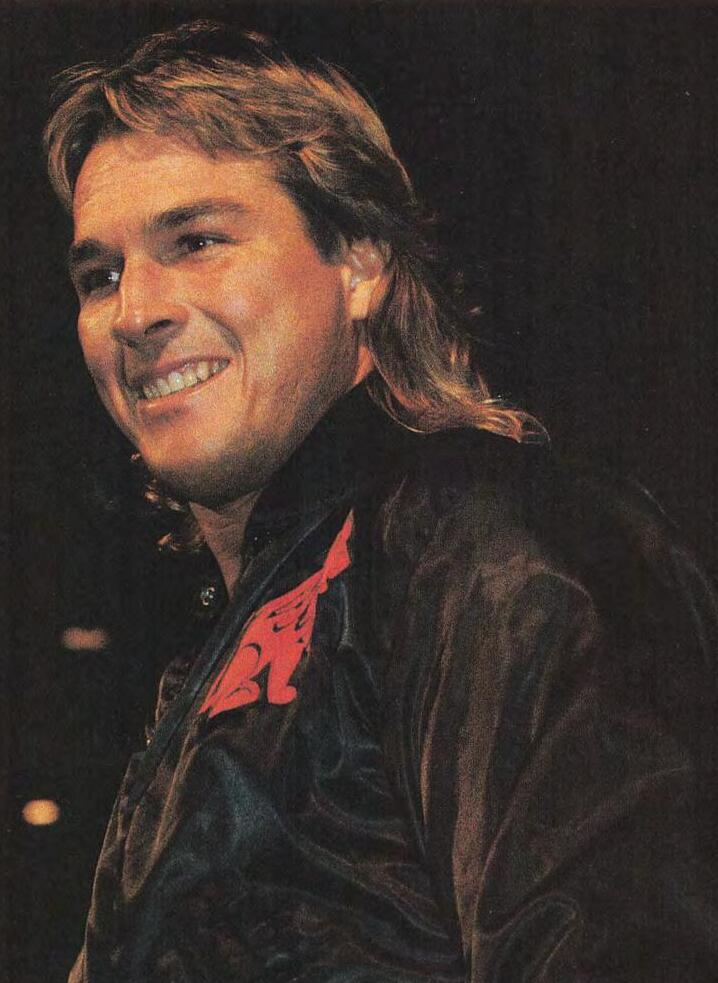
- Taylor, c. 1987

Personal information
- Born: Paul Worden Taylor III; August 12, 1955 (age 71) Greenville, South Carolina, U.S.
- Education: Guilford College
- Spouse: Trudy Taylor (m. 1988; died 2011)
- Children: 2

Professional wrestling career
- Ring name(s): Dr. Feelgood; The Red Rooster; Scary Terry Taylor; Terry Taylor; Terrance Taylor; Taylor Made Man
- Billed height: 6 ft 1 in (185 cm)
- Billed weight: 225 lb (102 kg)
- Billed from: Vero Beach, Florida
- Debut: 1979
- Retired: 2006

Paul Worden Taylor III (born August 12, 1955), better known by his ring name Terry Taylor, is an American retired professional wrestler. He is signed to WWE as a trainer at the Performance Center. He is best known for his time as an in-ring performer in World Championship Wrestling, and the World Wrestling Federation. From 2003 until 2011, he worked as a road agent, trainer, interviewer and the director of talent relations in Total Nonstop Action Wrestling. Since 2012, Taylor has worked as a trainer in WWE's developmental territory, NXT.

== Professional wrestling career ==
=== Early career (1979–1984) ===
Terry Taylor was a popular fan favorite for much of his early career in the Mid-South region, as well as the Mid-Atlantic in the 1980s. Taylor was originally selected to be part of The Fabulous Ones tag team with Stan Lane, but that role went to Florida wrestler, Steve Keirn. Taylor then formed a tag team with Bobby Fulton called the Fantastic Ones. After they split up, Fulton teamed with Tommy Rogers to form The Fantastics.

On June 7, 1981, Taylor won the NWA World Junior Heavyweight Championship from Les Thornton at the Roanoke Civic Center, dropping it back to him in the return match thirteen days later. Also wrestled for Mid-Atlantic Championship Wrestling, and Georgia Championship Wrestling in 1981 and 1982.

=== Mid-South Wrestling / Universal Wrestling Federation (1984–1986) ===
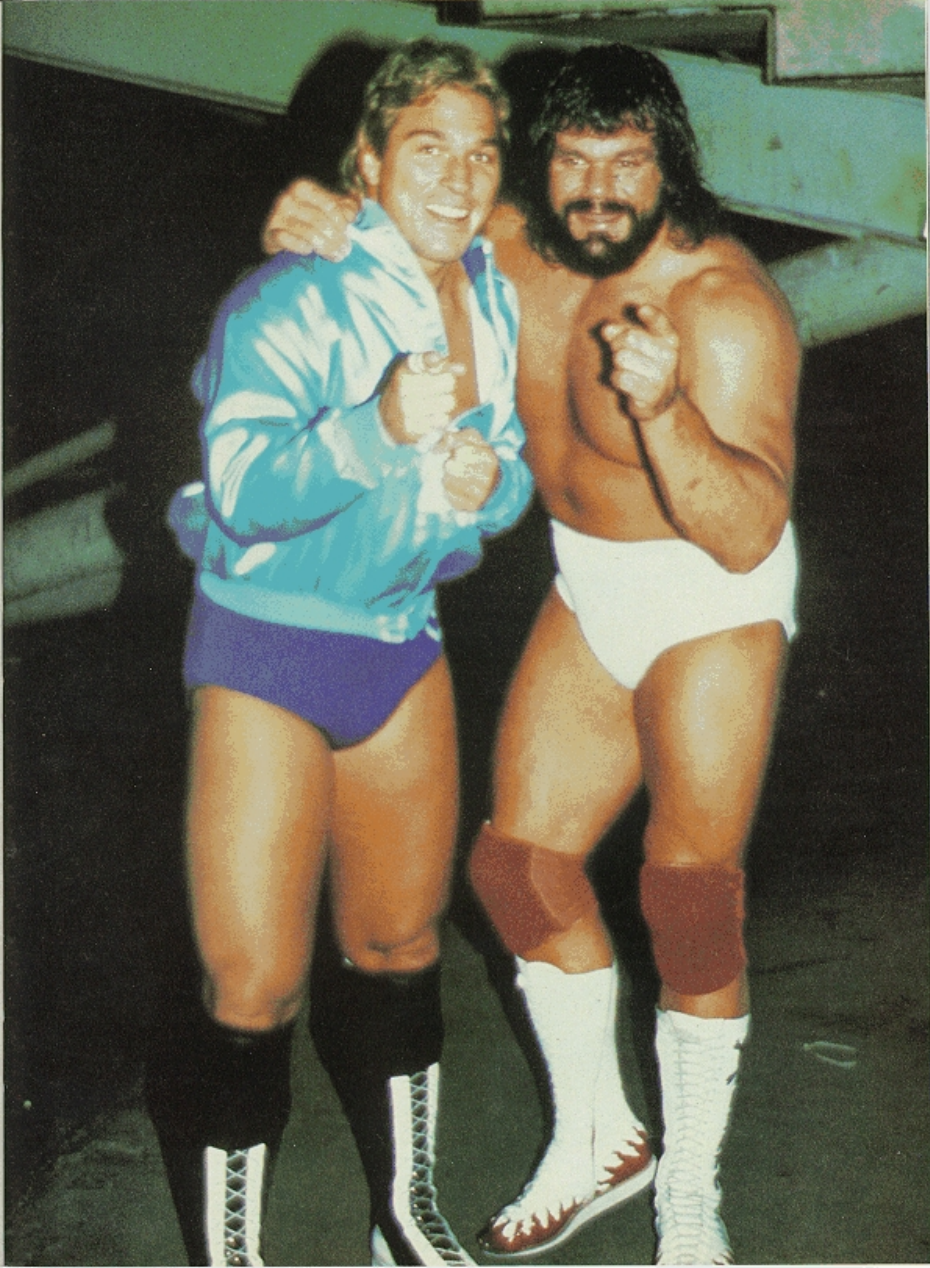
Terry Taylor (left) and "Dr. Death" Steve Williams (right) in 1986

Taylor made his way to Mid-South in January 1984 and feuded with the team of Nikolai Volkoff and Krusher Darsow. Darsow changed his name to Krusher Khruschev, and he and Taylor met in the finals of a May tournament to crown the first ever Mid-South TV champion, which Khruschev won. 45 days later, Taylor defeated Khruschev in New Orleans to begin his first of four TV title reigns. Taylor feuded with "Nature Boy" Buddy Landel over the NWA National Heavyweight Championship in 1985. On March 13 of that year, he defeated Ted DiBiase for the North American Heavyweight Championship, the Mid South region's top title at the time.

Moving back to the Mid-South region in 1986, which been renamed the Universal Wrestling Federation (UWF), Taylor became one of the promotion's biggest stars and defeated Buzz Sawyer for the UWF Television Championship in May. He won the UWF Tag Team Championship with "Gentleman" Chris Adams in early 1987, before breaking up their "Dream Team" to begin a heated rivalry. Taylor subsequently cemented his heel turn by aligning with wrestler/manager Eddie Gilbert. In response Adams formed an alliance with Gilbert's recently estranged protegé Sting - completing the latter's turn to babyface - and they feuded with Taylor and Gilbert. Taylor won the UWF Television Championship from Shane Douglas, who had won it from Gilbert following interference by Sting.

=== Jim Crockett Promotions (1987–1988) ===
After Jim Crockett Promotions took over the UWF later that year, Taylor, still the UWF Television Champion, initiated a dispute with Nikita Koloff over the NWA World Television Championship by stealing Koloff's belt, which led to a unification match of the two titles at Starrcade '87: Chi-Town Heat, which Taylor would lose before abruptly leaving the promotion.

=== World Class Championship Wrestling (1988) ===
In early 1988, Taylor returned in World Class Championship Wrestling, where he and Adams continued their feud until early June. Taylor won the Texas Heavyweight Championship from Matt Borne and defended it against Adams, Kevin Von Erich, and others. Terry also held the tag team title with Iceman King Parsons for a short time. Taylor eventually departed WCCW.

=== World Wrestling Federation (1988–1990) ===
In 1988, Taylor signed with the World Wrestling Federation. He made his initial debut in a house show, defeating Tito Santana on July 10, 1988 in Las Vegas, Nevada. Three days later he made his televised debut as babyface "Scary" Terry Taylor, he teamed with Sam Houston against The Conquistadors on the August 1, 1988 airing of WWF Prime Time Wrestling. After Houston was pinned, Taylor got on the mic and berated him for losing the match, before attacking him and turning heel.

Taylor soon acquired Bobby "The Brain" Heenan as his manager and was rebranded the "Red Rooster", a gimmick which saw him don red tights and ring coat and, later as a babyface, style his hair like a rooster's comb and strut like a rooster. Early in his Red Rooster stint, the heel Taylor was described by Heenan as a novice wrestler who could not navigate his way through matches without constant instructions from his manager, despite objections from announcers such as Gorilla Monsoon who would recall him showing considerable promise in matches prior to Heenan's involvement. The Rooster made his pay-per-view debut in the main event of Survivor Series '88, where he was the first wrestler eliminated from the match.

On the January 7, 1989 episode of Saturday Night's Main Event XIX, the Rooster lost a match to Tito Santana due to being distracted by an argument with Heenan. Following the loss, Heenan slapped Taylor. Taylor, tired of Heenan's demeaning style of coaching, turned against his manager and attacked him. He became a face as a result, though he retained the Red Rooster gimmick. Heenan feigned wanting to make amends with Taylor on Prime Time Wrestling, but it was a set-up for Taylor to be ambushed by Heenan's new protege, long-time enhancement talent Steve Lombardi, who Heenan reinvented as the "Brooklyn Brawler". The two feuded, leading to the Rooster defeating the Brawler on the March 11, 1989 episode of Saturday Night's Main Event XX and then defeating Heenan himself in a 30-second squash at WrestleMania V.

Taylor would then primarily be used to put over other talent. While he still earned victories against enhancement talent, he was usually on the losing end against established stars. He worked a program with Mr. Perfect, losing to him at SummerSlam '89 and again on the November 25, 1989 episode of Saturday Night's Main Event XXIV. At Survivor Series '89, he was part of Dusty Rhodes's "Dream Team". Though Taylor was eliminated from the match, the Dream Team was victorious. The Rooster's last pay-per-view appearance was as a participant in the 1990 Royal Rumble match (replacing The Widow Maker), where he lasted only two minutes before being eliminated by André the Giant. Taylor left the federation in June 1990.

The "Red Rooster" gimmick has been described as having a longlasting, very negative effect on Taylor's career as well.

=== World Championship Wrestling (1990–1992) ===
In 1990, Taylor returned to Jim Crockett Promotions, now renamed World Championship Wrestling (WCW) following a sale to Turner Broadcasting System. Two months after signing, Taylor made his return in a win by disqualification over "Mean" Mark Callous. He later re-debuted as "Terry Taylor" and unsuccessfully challenged Arn Anderson for the WCW World Television Championship on several occasions, with most of the matches ending in time-limit draws. In late 1990, Taylor began a short feud with Michael Wallstreet, which ended abruptly after Wallstreet jumped to the WWF.

In January 1991, Taylor took Wallstreet's place in the York Foundation and a couple months later was renamed Terrence Taylor (It was customary for York Foundation members to use formalized versions of their first names and wear suits as part of the "business" gimmick). He feuded with Tom Zenk, Dustin Rhodes and Bobby Eaton, and won the WCW World Six-Man Tag Team Championship with Richard Morton and Thomas Rich. Taylor was the senior wrestling member of the York Foundation and either was a singles wrestler or teamed with fellow York Foundation members during its existence. The exception was at The Great American Bash, when he teamed with "Stunning" Steve Austin in a scaffold match, losing to P. N. News and Bobby Eaton. For a time in late-1991 to early-1992, Taylor teased a face turn by arguing with manager Alexandra York and the rest of the group.

After the York Foundation disbanded, Taylor (billed as 'The Taylor Made Man') remained heel and formed a tag team with Greg Valentine in 1992. They held the WCW United States Tag Team Championship for three months. He departed WCW in August 1992.

=== Eastern Championship Wrestling (1992) ===
Taylor would make three appearances for Eastern Championship Wrestling during September and October 1992. He would defeat Larry Winters and lost twice to Tony Stetson.

=== Return to WWF (1992–1993) ===
On September 21, 1992 Taylor returned to the WWF as a heel under the name "Terrific Terry Taylor" and continued to use his Red Rooster entrance theme, but minus the rooster crows. His first match under this was when he defeated Jim Brunzell at a WWF Superstars taping in Winnipeg, Manitoba. He was undefeated for his first month, gaining a series of house show victories over Jim Powers. In November he began a house show program with Max Moon, followed a month later with a series against Lance Cassidy. Taylor was primarily used to put over other talent. His most high profile match during this time was a loss to Randy Savage on the December 14, 1992 airing of Prime Time Wrestling. He appeared in the 1993 Royal Rumble match, but was eliminated in 24 seconds by Ted DiBiase. He worked house shows in the spring against Typhoon, then became a broadcaster and backstage interviewer, wrestling his last on screen match on the May 22, 1993 edition of WWF Mania against Tatanka. Taylor would leave the company in August 1993 after his final match, which was a house show match where he lost to Brutus Beefcake in Sheffield, England.

=== Second return to WCW (1993–1994) ===
Taylor returned to WCW again in September 1993, doing both commentary and in ring business. In January 1994 he teamed with Erik Watts in a televised loss to Pretty Wonderful on WCW Saturday Night. Wrestling as a face, Taylor began a program with "Diamond" Dallas Page and defeated him at SuperBrawl IV on February 20. As in the WWF, Taylor began commentary work and teamed with Tony Schiavone on play-by-play for WCW Power Hour. After wrestling The Honky Tonk Man and Tex Slazenger during the spring and summer, he ended his run with three straight victories over Jean Paul Levesque on an August house show tour of Texas.

=== American Wrestling Federation (1994–1995) ===
Taylor became an announcer for the American Wrestling Federation (AWF) in 1994. A fan of wrestling announcer Gordon Solie, Taylor would often use Solie's famous phrases, pronouncing a suplex as a "soo-play" and a clothesline as a "lariat." He defeated Blacktop Bully by disqualification on April 29, 1995 at an AWF event.

=== Third return to WCW (1996–1998) ===
Taylor spent several years in WCW working backstage, as a road agent and a writer. Along with Annette Yother, Craig Leathers, Eric Bischoff and Kevin Sullivan, he wrote content for Nitro and WCW pay-per-views. He made his return to the ring on April 20, 1996 in Little Rock, AR when he defeated Steve Regal and would occasionally wrestle on house shows over the next two and a half years. His last match came on September 23, 1998, when he faced Steve McMichael in Utica, NY at a house show.

=== Second return to WWF (1998–1999) ===
Taylor returned to the WWF in 1998, doing interviews backstage and sometimes commentary on WWF television. As with WCW, he would occasionally wrestle on live events. His first match would be against Kurt Angle on May 15, 1999 in Baltimore, MD. His final match was against Joey Abs on September 23, 1999.

=== Fourth return to WCW (1999–2001) ===
After conducting backstage interviews for a year in the WWF, Taylor returned to WCW yet again. He appeared in a backstage segment with Kimberly on Monday Nitro on November 15, 1999. During this run in WCW, Taylor co-hosted and provided commentary for WCW Saturday Night with Larry Zbyszko. While in WCW, Taylor would also wrestle for the independent promotions. He defeated Tom Prichard at the 2nd Annual Brian Pillman Memorial Show on May 19, 1999, and on July 30, he lost to Chris Jericho at the Mark Curtis Comes Home Memorial Show. He remained with the company until WWF bought it out in March 2001. His last on-screen appearance for WCW was as a company representative for a contract signing between Booker T and Scott Steiner on the March 19, 2001 episode of Monday Nitro for their match that would take place the following week. On August 9, 2001, he defeated Bobby Eaton at 4th Annual Brian Pillman Memorial Show in a match refereed by Ricky Steamboat.

=== Third return to WWE (2002–2003) ===
In September 2002, Taylor returned to the now-renamed WWE as a road agent. Taylor lasted in this capacity until July 14, 2003, when he was released from his contract.

=== Total Nonstop Action Wrestling (2003–2011) ===
Taylor began working for Total Nonstop Action Wrestling in 2003. Prior to becoming Head of Talent Relations, he also worked as a road agent, trainer, and interviewer. His only match for TNA was on September 24, 2003, where he defeated Kid Kash. While in TNA, Taylor wrestled for independent promotions, notably teaming with Cyrus in Canada for Ontario's Border City Wrestling and Manitoba's No Holds Barred promotions. On December 30, 2003, Tayor lost to Steve Williams in a match for the vacated NWA Mid-Atlantic Heavyweight title in Guangzhou, China. His last match was on November 25, 2006 defeating Adrian Lynch for PPW Bash At The Beach in Menasha, Wisconsin. On May 20, 2011, Taylor was fired from the promotion.

=== Fourth return to WWE (2012–present) ===
In 2012, Taylor was re-signed by WWE to work as a trainer in its developmental territory NXT.

According to Pro Wrestling Torch in 2017, Taylor along with Shawn Michaels taught the finishing class at the WWE Performance Center, the last of four levels of classes.

== Personal life ==
On April 12, 2004, Taylor had three vertebrae in his neck fused together. On April 3, 2006, he underwent a three-hour cervical fusion surgery in which his sixth and seventh vertebrae were joined. Following the second operation, he announced his retirement from the ring.

Taylor is a born-again Christian and has appeared on some of the wrestling and religion shows that Ted DiBiase produces.

Taylor has two sons. His wife and their mother Trudy (née Davidson) died of cancer on July 14, 2011.

== Championships and accomplishments ==
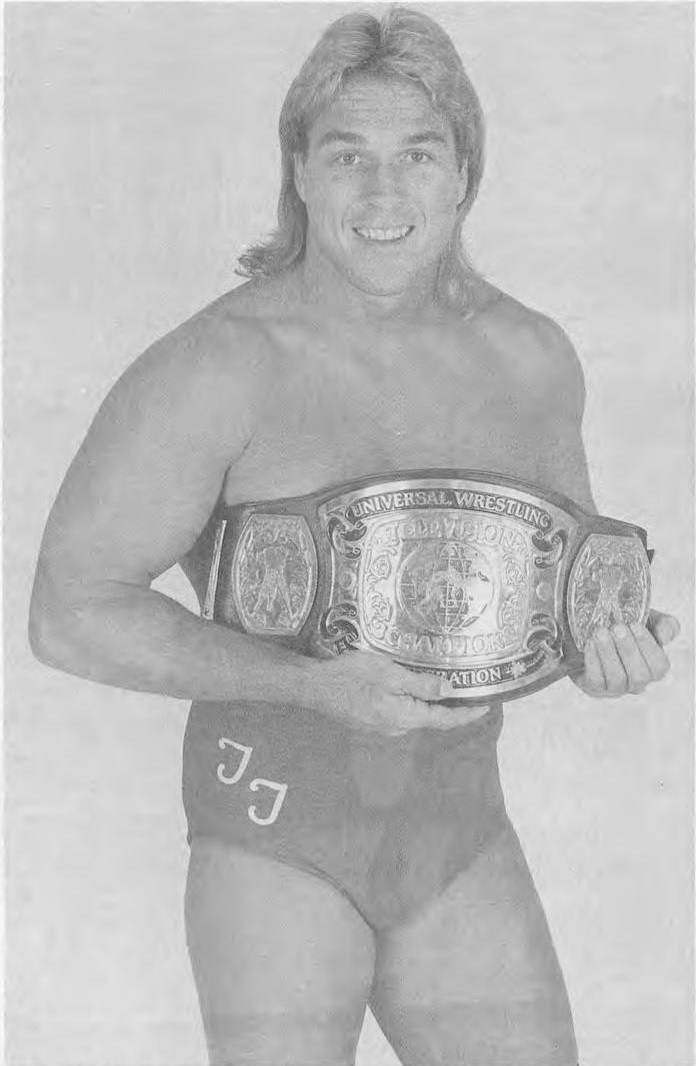
Terry Taylor with the UWF Television Championship, c. 1987.

- Border City Wrestling
  - BCW Can-Am Tag Team Championship (1 time) – with Cyrus
- Cauliflower Alley Club
  - Iron Mike Award (2014)
- Central States Wrestling
  - NWA Central States Tag Team Championship (1 time) – with Bob Brown
  - NWA Central States Television Championship (1 time)
- Continental Wrestling Association
  - AWA Southern Heavyweight Championship (3 times)
  - AWA Southern Tag Team Championship (1 time) – with Steve Keirn
  - CWA International Heavyweight Championship (2 times)
  - NWA Mid-America Heavyweight Championship (1 time)
- Georgia Championship Wrestling
  - NWA National Heavyweight Championship (1 time)
  - NWA National Television Championship (1 time)
- Mid-Atlantic Championship Wrestling / World Championship Wrestling
  - NWA World Junior Heavyweight Championship (1 time)
  - WCW United States Tag Team Championship (1 time) – with Greg Valentine
  - WCW World Six-Man Tag Team Championship (1 time) – with Richard Morton and Thomas Rich
- Mid-Atlantic Championship Wrestling^{1}
  - NWA Mid-Atlantic Tag Team Championship (1 time) – with Rick Steiner
- Mid-South Wrestling / Universal Wrestling Federation
  - Mid-South North American Heavyweight Championship (1 time)
  - Mid-South Television Championship (2 times)
  - UWF World Tag Team Championship (2 times) – with Chris Adams (1) and Jim Duggan (1)
  - UWF World Television Championship (2 times)
- NWA Music City Wrestling
  - NWA North American Heavyweight Championship (1 time)
- Pro Wrestling Illustrated
  - PWI ranked him #197 of the 500 best singles wrestlers during the "PWI Years" in 2003
  - Rookie of the Year (1980)
- Southeastern Championship Wrestling
  - NWA Southeastern Heavyweight Championship (Northern Division) (1 time)
  - NWA Southeastern Television Championship (1 time)
- World Class Wrestling Association
  - WCWA Texas Heavyweight Championship (1 time)
  - WCWA World Tag Team Championship (1 time) – with Iceman Parsons
- Wrestling Observer Newsletter
  - Most Underrated (1991, 1992)
  - Worst Worked Match of the Year (1991) with Steve Austin vs. P. N. News and Bobby Eaton in a Scaffold match at The Great American Bash

^{1}The Mid-Atlantic promotion in which Taylor and Steiner won the NWA Mid-Atlantic Tag Team Championship is not the same promotion that was once owned by Jim Crockett Jr. and sold to Ted Turner in 1988. That promotion went on to be renamed World Championship Wrestling and was sold to World Wrestling Entertainment in 2001. This current promotion, however, operates within the same region as the original and uses some of the same regional championships, primarily the NWA Mid-Atlantic Heavyweight and Tag Team Championships.
