= NWA Battle of the Belts =

Battle of the Belts
- Promotions: Championship Wrestling from Florida
- First event: Battle of the Belts I (1985)
- Last event: Battle of the Belts III (1986)
- Signature matches: Major NWA and CWF championship matches

Battle of the Belts was a major professional wrestling supercard produced by Championship Wrestling from Florida (CWF) under the National Wrestling Alliance (NWA) banner. Three Battle of the Belts events were held in 1985 and 1986.

The event was centered around major championship matches from CWF and the NWA World Heavyweight Championship was defended on all three events, with Ric Flair defending the title on all three editions. Ric Flair headlined the first two events as the NWA World Heavyweight Champion while the third event was headlined by a NWA Florida Heavyweight Championship match between defending champion Ron Bass and Barry Windham.

== History ==
The first Battle of the Belts event was held at the Tampa SunDome in Tampa, Florida on September 2, 1985. It aired live on syndicated television. The event featured seven matches. It was headlined by a two out of three falls match, in which Ric Flair defended the NWA World Heavyweight Championship against Wahoo McDaniel. Flair retained the title with 2–1 score. In other prominent matches at the event, The Road Warriors (Animal and Hawk) retained the AWA World Tag Team Championship against Harley Race and Stan Hansen via a double count-out, Rick Rude defeated Billy Jack Haynes to retain the NWA Florida Southern Heavyweight Championship and Kendall Windham defeated Jack Hart to win the NWA Florida Heavyweight Championship.

The second event was held at the Eddie Graham Sports Complex in Orlando, Florida on February 14, 1986. Featuring a card of seven matches, the event was headlined by a NWA World Heavyweight Championship match, in which Ric Flair retained the title against Barry Windham via a double count-out. The match was critically acclaimed, receiving praise from industry journalists, specifically Dave Meltzer, who gave it a 5-star rating and awarded it as the Pro Wrestling Match of the Year for 1986. In other championship matches on the card, Lex Luger defeated Jesse Barr to win the NWA Florida Southern Heavyweight Championship, Denny Brown defeated The White Ninja by disqualification to retain the NWA World Junior Heavyweight Championship, Kendall Windham defeated Prince Iaukea to retain the NWA Florida Heavyweight Championship and Tyree Pride defeated Ron Slinker to retain the NWA Florida Bahamian Championship.

The third and final event was held at the Ocean Center in Daytona Beach, Florida on September 1, 1986. It featured a total of nine matches including eight televised matches. It was the first event that did not feature the NWA World Heavyweight Championship in the main event. Instead, the Florida Heavyweight Championship was defended in the main event, as Barry Windham defeated the defending champion Ron Bass to win the title. The event featured two world championship matches. In the first world championship match, Nick Bockwinkel defeated Kendo Nagasaki via disqualification to retain the AWA World Heavyweight Championship. In the second world championship match, Ric Flair retained the NWA World Heavyweight Championship against Lex Luger via a time limit draw in a two out of three falls match. While it received mixed reviews from critics, some considered it the best of the three Battle of the Belts shows.

Battle of the Belts name was used by various other promotions for their events. In 1993, Eastern Championship Wrestling promoted a supercard under the title. From 2022 to 2024, All Elite Wrestling promoted a supercard by the title as it was centered around championship matches.

== Events ==
#	Event	Date	City	Venue	Main event
1	Battle of the Belts I	September 2, 1985	Tampa, Florida	Tampa SunDome	Ric Flair (c) vs. Wahoo McDaniel in a two out of three falls match for the NWA World Heavyweight Championship
2	Battle of the Belts II	February 14, 1986	Orlando, Florida	Eddie Graham Sports Complex	Ric Flair (c) vs. Barry Windham for the NWA World Heavyweight Championship
3	Battle of the Belts III	September 1, 1986	Daytona Beach, Florida	Ocean Center	Ron Bass (c) vs. Barry Windham for the NWA Florida Heavyweight Championship
(c) – refers to the champion(s) heading into the match
