= NWA Battle of the Belts II =

Battle of the Belts II
- Promotion: Championship Wrestling from Florida
- Date: February 14, 1986
- City: Orlando, Florida
- Venue: Eddie Graham Sports Complex

Event chronology
← Previous; Battle of the Belts I	Next → Battle of the Stars II

Battle of the Belts chronology
← Previous; I	Next → III

Battle of the Belts II was the second Battle of the Belts professional wrestling supercard produced by Championship Wrestling from Florida (CWF) under the National Wrestling Alliance (NWA) banner. It took place on February 14, 1986 at the Eddie Graham Sports Complex in Orlando, Florida.

Seven professional wrestling matches were contested at the event. The main event was contested for the NWA World Heavyweight Championship as Ric Flair defended the title against Barry Windham. The match ended in a double count-out, resulting in Flair retaining the title. In other championship matches on the card, Lex Luger defeated Jesse Barr to win the NWA Florida Southern Heavyweight Championship, Denny Brown defeated The White Ninja by disqualification to retain the NWA World Junior Heavyweight Championship, Kendall Windham defeated Prince Iaukea to retain the NWA Florida Heavyweight Championship and Tyree Pride defeated Ron Slinker to retain the NWA Florida Bahamian Championship.

The main event match between Flair and Windham was critically acclaimed, receiving praise from various journalists including Dave Meltzer of Wrestling Observer Newsletter, who gave it a 5-star rating and awarded it as the Pro Wrestling Match of the Year for 1986.

== Event ==
=== Preliminary matches ===
Other on-screen personnel
Role:	Name:
Commentators	Gordon Solie
Commentators	Mike Graham
Referee	Bill Alfonso
Interviewer	Buddy Colt

Battle of the Belts kicked off with a match for the NWA Florida Bahamian Championship as Tyree Pride defended the title against Ron Slinker. Pride delivered a crossbody to Slinker for the win to retain the title.

Next, Kendall Windham defended the NWA Florida Heavyweight Championship against Prince Iaukea. Iaukea missed a corner charge against Windham and Windham delivered a bulldog to Iaukea to retain the title.

In the following match, Denny Brown defended the NWA World Junior Heavyweight Championship against The White Ninja. Ninja delivered a back body drop to Brown over the top rope while Brown attempted to hit a Lou Thesz press. As a result, the referee disqualified Ninja as dumping an opponent over the top rope was considered an illegal move at the time. Due to that, Brown retained the title.

Next, Jesse Barr defended the NWA Florida Southern Heavyweight Championship against Lex Luger. Luger covered Barr for the pinfall after a lariat. Barr put his foot on the rope at one-count but Luger pulled his leg away and got the three-count to win the title. Following the match, Luger's manager Hiro Matsuda declared their intention of pursuing the NWA World Heavyweight Championship in a backstage interview with Buddy Colt.

It was followed by the first non-title match of the event, in which Wahoo McDaniel took on Bruiser Brody. The match was contested for a $20,000 bounty on McDaniel and Brody accepted the challenge. Both competitors brawled to the outside of the ring and the action continued in the ringside area, ending in a double count-out.

Next was the penultimate match of the event. It was a six-man tag team match, in which Blackjack Mulligan and The Road Warriors (Animal and Hawk) took on Army of Darkness (Kevin Sullivan, Maha Singh and Purple Haze). The referee was knocked out by Sullivan twice during the match. It continued as both teams brawled outside the ring to the backstage and the referee counted both teams out.

=== Main event match ===
Ric Flair defended the NWA World Heavyweight Championship against Barry Windham in the main event. Windham almost won the match by hitting a missile dropkick and getting a visual count on Flair while the referee was knocked out. As the referee regained consciousness, Flair hit a crossbody to Windham that knocked both men over the top rope and outside the ring. They brawled outside the ring and the match ended in a double count-out. As a result, Flair retained the title.

== Reception ==
Battle of the Belts II received mixed reviews from critics as mostly praised the main event of the show while panning the undercard, like the previous edition.

J.D. Dunn of 411Mania rated the event 6.0, praising the main event while considering the undercard "completely skip-able". Adam Nedeff gave a similar rating to the event, considering it a "one-match show" and recommended viewers to "Seek it out and go straight to the main event." According to Nedeff, the match between Flair and Windham was "Outstanding lost gem and worth seeking out."

Flair versus Windham received praise from renowned journalist Dave Meltzer of Wrestling Observer Newsletter, who gave it a rating of 5 stars and awarded it the Pro Wrestling Match of the Year. It was considered one of the best matches of Flair's career.

Andrew Kelly of The Sportster praised the main event as an "epic 41-minute battle" and appreciated both competitors' performances. According to Kelly, "Windham put on a great babyface performance, giving Flair his comeuppance for his sneaky and cowardly heel tactics, whilst also fighting through the blood and pain he was being put through."

According to Arnold Furious, Flair versus Windham "rescued another tired show from Florida. The territory is dead in the water but hey, you can always rely on Naitch to turn up and rock the main event. Barry Windham is a fascinating guy. He was arguably the best challenger Flair ever had, and that’s covering a lot of ground." Along with Flair, it was also one of the best singles matches for Windham's career, who according to Furious, "didn’t really have a great match with anyone else."

Gerard Di Trolio of Voices of Wrestling also praised the main event, deeming it "a great and historically notable match."

== Aftermath ==
Due to their NWA World Heavyweight Championship match ending in a double count-out, Windham received various rematches for the title against Flair, but lost on each occasion. Windham did win once via disqualification on August 12, resulting in Flair retaining the title.

Lex Luger and Jesse Barr continued their rivalry over the Florida Southern Heavyweight Championship following the event as Luger retained the title against Barr on three different occasions. The duo also competed in a series of non-title matches contested under various stipulations such as lights out matches, taped fist lumberjack matches, and Texas Deathmatches.

The bounty against Wahoo McDaniel continued after the event as Kendo Nagasaki successfully claimed the $10,000 bounty by defeating McDaniel on March 4. McDaniel and Nagasaki traded wins against each other following the match before ending the rivalry as McDaniel left CWF.

Blackjack Mulligan continued his rivalry with Army of Darkness following the event. On March 9, Mulligan teamed with his sons Barry and Kendall Windham to defeat Army of Darkness in a six-man tag team match to end the feud as Mulligan departed CWF.

== Results ==
No.	Results	Stipulations	Times
1	Tyree Pride (c) defeated Ron Slinker	Singles match for the NWA Florida Bahamian Championship	3:32
2	Kendall Windham (c) defeated Prince Iaukea	Singles match for the NWA Florida Heavyweight Championship	8:48
3	Denny Brown (c) defeated The White Ninja by disqualification	Singles match for the NWA World Junior Heavyweight Championship	13:36
4	Lex Luger (with Hiro Matsuda) defeated Jesse Barr (c)	Singles match for the NWA Florida Southern Heavyweight Championship	20:35
5	Bruiser Brody (with Gary Hart) vs. Wahoo McDaniel ended in a double count-out	Singles match	5:00
6	Army of Darkness (Kevin Sullivan, Maha Singh and Purple Haze) (with Luna) vs. Blackjack Mulligan and The Road Warriors (Animal and Hawk) (with Paul Ellering) ended in a double count-out	Six-man tag team match	6:00
7	Ric Flair (c) vs. Barry Windham ended in a double count-out	Singles match for the NWA World Heavyweight Championship	41:45
(c) / – the champion(s) heading into the match

== See also ==
- 1986 in professional wrestling
