= NWA Battle of the Belts III =

Battle of the Belts III
- Promotion: Championship Wrestling from Florida
- Date: September 1, 1986
- City: Daytona Beach, Florida
- Venue: Ocean Center
- Attendance: 8,000

Event chronology
| ← Previous; Battle of the Stars II | Next → War of the Worlds |

Battle of the Belts chronology
| ← Previous; II | Next → Last |

Battle of the Belts III was the third Battle of the Belts professional wrestling supercard produced by Championship Wrestling from Florida (CWF) under the National Wrestling Alliance (NWA) banner. It took place on September 1, 1986 at the Ocean Center in Daytona Beach, Florida. The event drew an attendance of 8,000 fans.

Nine professional wrestling matches were contested at the event. In the main event, Barry Windham defeated Ron Bass to win the NWA Florida Heavyweight Championship, marking the only time that a mid-card championship match headlined Battle of the Belts. Other championship matches on the undercard saw Ric Flair retain the NWA World Heavyweight Championship against Lex Luger via a TV time limit draw in a two out of three falls match, Chris Champion retain the NWA Florida Bahamian Championship against Kendall Windham, The White Ninja defeat Tim Horner to win the NWA Southeastern United States Junior Heavyweight Championship, and The Fabulous Ones (Stan Lane and Steve Keirn) retain the NWA Florida United States Tag Team Championship against The Sheepherders (Butch Miller and Luke Williams). The event also featured participation from American Wrestling Association, as Nick Bockwinkel defended the AWA World Heavyweight Championship against Kendo Nagasaki.

== Event ==
The Battle of the Belts III card started with a match between Bob Cook and Jim Backlund, which Backlund won. The match was not televised.

=== Preliminary matches ===
Other on-screen personnel
| Role: | Name: |
|---|---|
| Commentators | Gordon Solie |
| Commentators | Stan Rhodes |
| Referees | Bill Alfonso |
| Referees | Jimmy Jett |

The first televised match on the card saw Tyree Pride take on The Cuban Assassin. Pride pinned Assassin with a schoolboy roll-up for the win.

It was followed by the first title match of the event, as The Fabulous Ones (Stan Lane and Steve Keirn) defended the NWA Florida United States Tag Team Championship against The Sheepherders (Butch Miller and Luke Williams). Luke distracted the referee, allowing Butch to hit Lane with a flag. However, as Butch was being ejected from the ring by the referee, Fabulous Ones pulled a switcheroo and Keirn, despite being illegal, pinned Luke to win the match and retain the title.

Next, Tim Horner defended the NWA Southeastern United States Junior Heavyweight Championship against The White Ninja. Ninja's manager Kendo Nagasaki tripped Horner off the ropes while Horner was running through the ropes, allowing Ninja to hit a moonsault to Horner to win the title.

In the following match, Nagasaki challenged Nick Bockwinkel for the latter's AWA World Heavyweight Championship. Nagasaki's manager Sir Oliver Humperdink grabbed Bockwinkel's leg while Bockwinkel was about to deliver a scoop slam to Nagasaki, allowing Nagasaki to fall on top of Bockwinkel. However, the referee disqualified Nagasaki due to Humperdink's interference and Bockwinkel retained the title.

Next, The Road Warriors (Animal and Hawk) took on The Shock Troops (Ed Gantner and Kareem Muhammad). The brawl intensified between both teams and the referee was repeatedly shoved by the teams, forcing him to disqualify both teams.

Later, Chris Champion defended the NWA Florida Bahamian Championship against Kendall Windham. Champion shoved Windham into the referee as Windham tried to deliver a bulldog. However, Windham managed to deliver a bulldog in the second attempt but the referee disqualified Champion for that. As a result, Champion retained the title.

It was followed by the penultimate match, a two out of three falls match, in which Ric Flair defended the NWA World Heavyweight Championship against Lex Luger. Each round had a twenty-minute time limit. Luger's knee was injured in the first fall as he tried to charge towards Flair to the turnbuckles. It allowed Flair to apply a figure four leglock on Luger and grab the ropes, pinning Luger to win the first fall. Flair continued to target the leg but missed a big splash on the leg. Luger then caught a running Flair with a powerslam to win the second fall, tying the score at 1-1. The third fall ended as the twenty-minute time limit expired while Luger had applied a bearhug on Flair. As a result, the match ended in a draw and Flair retained the title.

=== Main event match ===
Ron Bass defended the NWA Florida Heavyweight Championship against Barry Windham in the main event. Bass loaded up his elbow pad and tried to hit Windham but Windham countered with a sunset flip to pin Windham and win the Florida Heavyweight Championship.

== Reception ==
Battle of the Belts III received mixed to negative reviews from critics.

J.D. Dunn of 411Mania panned the event at a rating of 4. He stated "While Florida nostalgists might get a kick out of it, there's not much to recommend outside of seeing an early Flair/Luger meeting. Very few of the matches have any context, so unless you want to look up the feud (if any), many of the matches are meaningless. Can't recommend this one, old-school fans. Thumbs down."

Adam Nedeff of 411Mania considered it an average show and rated it 4.5. According to him, the event was "The best of the 3 Battle of the Belts shows", with "most of the action moving at a good pace". He stated that "the cop-out finishes were a little obnoxious, but nothing offensively bad, and that main event is a treat."

== Aftermath ==
Fabulous Ones continued their rivalry against Sheepherders for the United States Tag Team Championship after the event. Fabulous Ones retained the titles on September 14, before Sheepherders defeated Fabulous Ones to win the titles on October 7. However, Fabulous Ones regained the titles on November 30.

Barry Windham and Ron Bass continued their feud over the Florida Heavyweight Championship, as Bass defeated Windham for the title in a rematch on September 16. Windham regained the title on September 24 but the title was held up due to Bass using chloroform during a title match. On October 8, Windham eventually defeated Bass in a rematch to win the vacant Florida Heavyweight Championship at a television taping.

== Results ==
| No. | Results | Stipulations | Times |
|---|---|---|---|
| 1^{D} | Jim Backlund defeated Bob Cook | Singles match | — |
| 2 | Tyree Pride defeated The Cuban Assassin | Singles match | 15:20 |
| 3 | The Fabulous Ones (Stan Lane and Steve Keirn) (c) defeated The Sheepherders (Butch Miller and Luke Williams) | Tag team match for the NWA Florida United States Tag Team Championship | 7:45 |
| 4 | The White Ninja (with Kendo Nagasaki) defeated Tim Horner (c) | Singles match for the NWA Southeastern United States Junior Heavyweight Championship | 11:00 |
| 5 | Nick Bockwinkel (c) defeated Kendo Nagasaki (with Sir Oliver Humperdink) by disqualification | Singles match for the AWA World Heavyweight Championship | 7:00 |
| 6 | The Road Warriors (Animal and Hawk) (with Paul Ellering) vs. The Shock Troops (Ed Gantner and Kareem Muhammad) (with Sir Oliver Humperdink) ended in a double disqualification | Tag team match | 6:50 |
| 7 | Kendall Windham defeated Chris Champion (c) by disqualification | Singles match for the NWA Florida Bahamian Championship | 4:00 |
| 8 | Ric Flair (c) vs. Lex Luger ended in a TV time limit draw (1:1) | Two out of three falls match for the NWA World Heavyweight Championship | 31:18 |
| 9 | Barry Windham defeated Ron Bass (c) | Singles match for the NWA Florida Heavyweight Championship | — |
(c) / – the champion(s) heading into the match; D / – this was a dark match

== See also ==
- 1986 in professional wrestling
