= NWA Battle of the Belts I =

Battle of the Belts I
- Promotion: Championship Wrestling from Florida
- Date: September 2, 1985
- City: Tampa, Florida
- Venue: Tampa SunDome
- Attendance: 7,600

Event chronology
← Previous; Lords of the Ring	Next → Battle of the Belts II

Battle of the Belts chronology
← Previous; First	Next → II

Battle of the Belts (sequentially known as Battle of the Belts I) was the first Battle of the Belts professional wrestling supercard promoted by Championship Wrestling from Florida under the National Wrestling Alliance banner. The event was held at the Tampa SunDome in Tampa, Florida on September 2, 1985. The event drew a card of 7,600. The event also featured participation from American Wrestling Association (AWA) as it included wrestlers and championship matches from AWA.

Seven professional wrestling matches were contested at the event. The main event was a two out of three falls match, in which Ric Flair defended the NWA World Heavyweight Championship against Wahoo McDaniel. Flair retained the title with 2-1 score. In other prominent matches at the event, The Road Warriors (Animal and Hawk) retained the AWA World Tag Team Championship against Harley Race and Stan Hansen via a double count-out, Rick Rude defeated Billy Jack Haynes to retain the NWA Florida Southern Heavyweight Championship and Kendall Windham defeated Jack Hart to win the NWA Florida Heavyweight Championship.

== Event ==
=== Preliminary matches ===
Other on-screen personnel
Role:	Name:
Commentators	Gordon Solie
Commentators	Mike Graham

The event kicked off with a tag team match pitting Chavo Guerrero and Hector Guerrero against Rip Oliver and The Grappler. Grappler accidentally knocked out Oliver with his loaded boot after knocking Hector into the referee. The miscommunication allowed Chavo to pull Grappler out of the ring and Hector pinned Oliver for the win.

Next, Rip Rogers took on Coco Samoa. The referee was distracted by Rogers' valet Miss Brenda while Rogers was about to deliver a scoop slam to Samoa. The distraction allowed Samoa's valet Lady Maxine to pull Rogers from the hair, knocking him down to the floor. Samoa then pinned Rogers for the win.

It was followed by the first championship match of the event, in which Jack Hart defended the NWA Florida Heavyweight Championship against Kendall Windham. Hart pulled a foreign object out of his trunks and tried to knock Windham with it but Windham ducked it and hit a running crossbody to win the match and the Florida Heavyweight Championship.

Next, Rick Rude defended the NWA Florida Southern Heavyweight Championship against Billy Jack Haynes. Haynes tried to deliver a gorilla press slam to Rude but Rude's manager Percy Pringle III used his cane to save Rude. This distracted Haynes and he chased Pringle, distracting the referee. It allowed Rude to use Pringle's cane and hit Haynes with it to pin him and retain the title.

In the fifth match, The Road Warriors (Animal and Hawk) defended the AWA World Tag Team Championship against Harley Race and Stan Hansen. The action between the two teams spilled to the outside and ended in a double count-out, resulting in Road Warriors retaining the titles.

It was followed by the penultimate match, in which Nick Bockwinkel took on Frankie Lane. This match was originally supposed to be for the AWA World Heavyweight Championship between Bockwinkel and the champion Rick Martel. However, Martel missed the flight due to Hurricane Elena. As a result, Lane replaced Martel. Bockwinkel pinned Lane after Lane hit a diving crossbody to Bockwinkel but Bockwinkel overpowered him and pinned Lane for the win.

=== Main event ===
The main event was a two out of three falls match, in which Ric Flair defended the NWA World Heavyweight Championship against Wahoo McDaniel. McDaniel scored the first fall in the match by making Flair go to sleep with the sleeper hold. During the second fall, the referee got knocked out and McDaniel attempted to pin Flair with a backslide but pinfall could not be counted. It allowed Flair to pull McDaniel out of the ring and smash his face into the steel ringpost. Flair then tossed McDaniel in the ring and pinned him to win the second fall. In the third fall, McDaniel applied a sleeper hold on Flair and Flair bounced off the ropes to land on top of McDaniel and pin him while McDaniel's shoulders were down on the mat. As a result, Flair won the match 2-1 and retained the World Heavyweight Championship.

== Reception ==
Battle of the Belts was panned by critics. J.D. Dunn of 411Mania rated the event 4.5. He praised the two out of three falls match as "great" but recommended to "find it on a compilation or something rather than sitting through the undercard of this show."

According to Arnold Furious, the event "was not only a sad show to watch but one of the worst shows". He considered it the worst wrestling show in 1985. He praised the main event between Flair and McDaniel. He praised Flair "for getting something this decent out of a very long Wahoo match. 45 minutes of gruelling action." He recommended it as "clearly the best match on the show." He also had some praise for the AWA World Tag Team Championship match, considering it the best match on the undercard.

Dave Meltzer rated the main event between Flair and McDaniel 3.5 out of 5, while the opening two matches received ratings of 3.25.

== Aftermath ==
Kendall Windham continued his rivalry with Jack Hart over the Florida Heavyweight Championship, leading to a rematch between the two on October 2, where Windham retained the title.

Rick Rude continued his rivalry with Billy Jack Haynes as Rude teamed with different partners like Rip Oliver and Buddy Rose, attempting to win the NWA Florida United States Tag Team Championship from Haynes and Wahoo McDaniel, but failed in each attempt. It led to Rude defending the Florida Southern Heavyweight Championship against McDaniel in several matches. McDaniel eventually won the title by defeating Rude on October 2.

== Results ==
No.	Results	Stipulations	Times
1	Chavo Guerrero and Hector Guerrero defeated Rip Oliver and The Grappler	Tag team match	15:40
2	Coco Samoa (with Lady Maxine) defeated Rip Rogers (with Miss Brenda)	Singles match	10:49
3	Kendall Windham defeated Jack Hart (c) (with Percy Pringle III)	Singles match for the NWA Florida Heavyweight Championship	11:16
4	Rick Rude (c) (with Percy Pringle III) defeated Billy Jack Haynes	Singles match for the NWA Florida Southern Heavyweight Championship	14:16
5	The Road Warriors (Animal and Hawk) (c) (with Paul Ellering) vs. Harley Race and Stan Hansen ended in a double count-out	Tag team match for the AWA World Tag Team Championship	9:25
6	Nick Bockwinkel defeated Frankie Lane	Singles match	3:54
7	Ric Flair (c) defeated Wahoo McDaniel (2-1)	Two out of three falls match for the NWA World Heavyweight Championship	44:53
(c) / – the champion(s) heading into the match

== See also ==
- 1985 in professional wrestling
