= Goldberg win streak =

Lengthy series of victories by Bill Goldberg

The Goldberg win streak was a lengthy series of victories that established the character of American professional wrestler Goldberg, following his debut on WCW Monday Nitro on September 22, 1997. The unprecedented win streak proved to be essential in making Goldberg the breakout star of World Championship Wrestling (WCW), propelling the rookie wrestler to main event status within a year of his first match, and would become a tool used by other promotions to build young stars into main event players. While officially cited as 173–0, a definitive breakdown of all available match results shows that Goldberg began his career at an untelevised 5–1, and that following his debut he had an actual win streak of 156 consecutive victories with two that ended in no contest before his 1998 Starrcade loss to Kevin Nash.

== Background ==
=== Beginnings ===
During the rehab following his NFL injury, Goldberg began powerlifting and mixed martial arts training. He was spotted by Lex Luger and Sting who urged him to try professional wrestling. Although not a fan of professional wrestling, he saw it as an alternative to his fledgling football career and began training at the WCW Power Plant. Training under the tutelage of DeWayne Bruce, he made his debut as Bill Gold on a dark match at a Monday Nitro event on June 23, 1997, where he defeated Bruce (wrestling as Sgt. Buddy Lee Parker). He also faced and defeated Buddy Landell (Saturday Night dark match), Hugh Morrus (house show), Chip Minton (Nitro dark match), and John Betcha (house show). His final pre-televised appearance was in a dark match on July 24 at a Saturday Night taping in a loss to Chad Fortune.

=== The streak begins ===
Now 5–1, Bill Goldberg had yet to be seen on television. As such, he was "undefeated" when he made his televised debut on Monday Nitro on September 22, 1997. Behind the scenes, it was WCW announcer Mike Tenay who came up with the concept of the Goldberg win streak. Goldberg was booked to win over Morrus, and thus began a win streak that carried over onto Saturday Night and non-televised house shows. The longer the streak became, the more popular the Goldberg character became. After rampaging through most of WCW's undercard of wrestlers, Goldberg faced Raven on the April 20 edition of Monday Nitro and captured the WCW United States Heavyweight Championship. By June, he had eclipsed 100 wins, and was getting over as a main eventer. Hollywood Hogan eventually granted Goldberg a title match, which would take place on the July 6, 1998, episode of Nitro held at the Georgia Dome in Atlanta with over 40,000 in attendance, but Hogan insisted that Goldberg first had to defeat his nWo stablemate Scott Hall. Goldberg won and later in the evening was also able to defeat Hogan to become the WCW World Heavyweight Champion, in turn vacating his United States Heavyweight Championship.

=== Conclusion of the streak ===
"We had been talking about it, from what I can recall, for a couple of months. As I have touched on in previous shows ... we were just running out of guys for Goldberg to go through. Once we got to point of whatever it was 173–0 or whatever it was (laughs). It was that point where we had to start telling stories. We had to expand the storytelling process with Bill. We knew it had to be done"

— Eric Bischoff on his podcast Bischoff on Wrestling

Now WCW Champion, Goldberg found himself the cornerstone of the company's efforts to stave off the WWF. The former number two promotion was now running neck and neck with WWF, and Goldberg was programmed into a feud with Diamond Dallas Page. At Halloween Havoc, the feud was settled after Goldberg defeated Page to retain the title. According to Goldberg, his match against Page was the favorite match of his career. Following technical issues with the PPV the match was aired for free on the following Monday Nitro; the huge rating that it garnered was the final time that Nitro defeated Monday Night Raw.

As Goldberg moved on to a feud with The Giant, WCW management resorted to embellishing the win streak with fictional victories. Wrestling fans who followed match results online began to catch on as Goldberg's streak grew exponentially, and he began to incur the first backlash of his career. At Starrcade, Goldberg's undefeated streak ended at an official approximate count of 173–0, and after 174 days as champion when he lost the title to Kevin Nash, after Scott Hall, disguised as a ringside security guard, made a run-in and shocked Goldberg with a taser gun.

== List of matches ==
Matches in Goldberg's win streak
Date	Location	Arena	Venue	Opponent	Result	Record
June 23, 1997	Macon, GA	Coliseum	WCW Nitro dark match	Buddy Lee Parker	Won by pinfall	1–0
June 24, 1997	Dalton, GA	Coliseum	WCW Saturday Night dark match	Buddy Landell	Won by pinfall	2–0
July 14, 1997	Orlando, FL	Arena	WCW Nitro dark match	Hugh Morrus	Won by pinfall	3–0
July 17, 1997	Cincinnati, OH	The Crown	WCW Nitro dark match	Chip Minton	Won by pinfall	4–0
July 22, 1997	Jacksonville, FL	Coliseum	WCW house show	John Betcha	Won by pinfall	5–0
July 24, 1997	WCW Sat Night taping	Arena	WCW Saturday Night dark match	Chad Fortune	Lost by pinfall	5–1
September 22, 1997	Salt Lake City, UT	E Center	WCW Nitro	Hugh Morrus	Won by pinfall	6–1
September 29, 1997	Worcester, MA	Centrum	WCW Nitro	The Barbarian	Won by pinfall	7–1
October 1, 1997	Dalton, GA		WCW Saturday Night	Roadblock	Won by pinfall	8–1
October 10, 1997	Orlando, FL	Universal Studios	WCW WorldWide	Manny Fernandez	Won by pinfall	9–1
October 13, 1997	Orlando, FL	Universal Studios	WCW Worldwide	Frankie Lancaster	Won by pinfall	10–1
October 13, 1997	Orlando, FL	Ice Palace	WCW Nitro	Scotty Riggs	Won by pinfall	11–1
October 14, 1997	Fort Myers, FL		WCW Saturday Night	Mike Anthony	Won by pinfall	12–1
October 20, 1997	Biloxi, MS	Mississippi Coast Coliseum	WCW Nitro	Wrath	Won by pinfall	13–1
October 28, 1997	San Bernardino, CA		WCW Saturday Night	The Renegade	Won by pinfall	14–1
November 2, 1997	Norfolk, VA	Scope	WCW house show	Bobby Eaton	Won by pinfall	15–1
November 8, 1997	Orlando, FL	Universal Studios	WCW Worldwide	Mark Starr	Won by pinfall	16–1
December 16, 1997	Gainesville, GA	Georgia Mountains Center	WCW Saturday Night	The Renegade	Won by pinfall	17–1
December 28, 1997	Washington, DC	MCI Center	WCW Starrcade 97	Steve McMichael	Won by pinfall	18–1
December 29, 1997	Baltimore, MD	Arena	WCW Nitro	Glacier	Won by pinfall	19–1
January 3, 1998	Columbia, SC	Township Auditorium	WCW house show	Bobby Eaton	Won by pinfall	20–1
January 4, 1998	Columbus, GA	Civic Center	WCW house show	Brad Armstrong	Won by pinfall	21–1
January 5, 1998	Atlanta, GA	Georgia Dome	WCW Nitro	Stevie Ray	Won by pinfall	22–1
January 6, 1998	Rome, GA	Forum	WCW Saturday Night	Barry Horowitz	Won by pinfall	23–1
January 8, 1998	Daytona Beach, FL	Ocean Center	WCW Thunder	Steve McMichael	Won by pinfall	24–1
January 12, 1998	Jacksonville, FL	Coliseum	WCW Nitro	Jerry Flynn	Won by pinfall	25–1
January 15, 1998	Lakeland, FL	Jenkins Arena	WCW Thunder	Chavo Guerrero Jr.	No contest	25–1
January 20, 1998	Thibodaux, LA	Civic Center	WCW Saturday Night	Mike Tolbert	Won by pinfall	26–1
January 20, 1998	Thibodaux, LA	Civic Center	WCW Saturday Night	Meng	Won by pinfall	27–1
January 22, 1998	Huntsville, AL	Von Braun Civic Center	WCW Thunder	Kendall Windham	Won by pinfall	28–1
January 26, 1998	Fort Wayne, IN	Allen County War Memorial Coliseum	WCW Nitro	Brad Armstrong	Won by pinfall	29–1
January 29, 1998	Memphis, TN	Mid-South Coliseum	WCW Thunder	Yuji Nagata	Won by pinfall	30–1
January 31, 1998	Boston, MA	Fleet Center	WCW Boston Brawl	Sgt. Buddy Lee Parker	Won by pinfall	31–1
February 2, 1998	San Antonio, TX	AlamoDome	WCW Nitro	Mark Starr	Won by pinfall	32–1
February 3, 1998	Corpus Christi, TX		WCW Saturday Night	Disco Inferno	Won by pinfall	33–1
February 5, 1998	Beaumont, TX	Civic Center	WCW Thunder	Jim Powers	Won by pinfall	34–1
February 9, 1998	El Paso, TX	Don Haskins Center	WCW Nitro	Lord Steven Regal	Won by pinfall	35–1
February 12, 1998	Oklahoma City, OK	Myriad	WCW Thunder	Glacier	Won by pinfall	36–1
February 13, 1998	Springfield, MO		WCW house show	Steve McMichael	Won by pinfall	37–1
February 14, 1998	Kansas City, KS	Memorial Hall	WCW house show	Steve McMichael	Won by pinfall	38–1
February 14, 1998	Orlando, FL	Universal Studios	WCW Worldwide	Joey Maggs	Won by pinfall	39–1
February 16, 1998	Tampa, FL	Fairgrounds	WCW Nitro	Hugh Morrus	Won by pinfall	40–1
February 17, 1998	Palmetto, FL	Manatee Civic Center	WCW Saturday Night	Jerry Flynn	Won by pinfall	41–1
February 19, 1998	Birmingham, AL	Jefferson Civic Center	WCW Thunder	Fit Finlay	Won by pinfall	42–1
February 22, 1998	San Francisco, CA	Cow Palace	WCW SuperBrawl VIII	Brad Armstrong	Won by pinfall	43–1
February 26, 1998	Cedar Rapids, IA	Five Seasons Center	WCW Thunder	Rick Fuller	Won by pinfall	44–1
March 2, 1998	Philadelphia, PA	Corestates Spectrum	WCW Nitro	Sick Boy	Won by pinfall	45–1
March 3, 1998	Johnstown, PA	Cambria County Civic Center	WCW Nitro	Chase Tatum	Won by pinfall	46–1
March 5, 1998	Columbus, OH	Convention Center	WCW Thunder	Vincent	Won by pinfall	47–1
March 6, 1998	Pittsburgh, PA	Palumbo Center	WCW house show	Yuji Nagata	Won by pinfall	48–1
March 7, 1998	Charleston, WV	Civic Center	WCW house show	Yuji Nagata	Won by pinfall	49–1
March 7, 1998	Orlando, FL	Universal Studios	WCW Saturday Night	Jerry Flynn	Won by pinfall	50–1
March 8, 1998	Johnson City, TN	Freedom Hall	WCW house show	Yuji Nagata	Won by pinfall	51–1
March 9, 1998	Winston-Salem, NC	Lawrence Joel Memorial Coliseum	WCW Nitro	Barry Darsow	Won by pinfall	52–1
March 16, 1998	Panama City, FL	Club La Vela	WCW Nitro	Lodi	Won by pinfall	53–1
March 18, 1998	Terre Haute, IN	Hulman Center	WCW Thunder	Wayne Bloom	Won by pinfall	54–1
March 19, 1998	Troy, OH	Hobart Arena	WCW house show	Brad Armstrong	Won by pinfall	55–1
March 20, 1998	Hammond, IN		WCW house show	Brad Armstrong	Won by pinfall	56–1
March 22, 1998	Cincinnati, OH	The Crown	WCW house show	Brad Armstrong	Won by pinfall	57–1
March 23, 1998	Louisville, KY	Freedom Hall	WCW Nitro	The Renegade	Won by pinfall	58–1
March 25, 1998	Baltimore, MD		WCW house show	Jerry Flynn	Won by pinfall	59–1
March 26, 1998	Fairfax, VA	Patriot Center	WCW Thunder	Jerry Flynn	Won by pinfall	60–1
March 27, 1998	Charlottesville, VA		WCW house show	Jerry Flynn	Won by pinfall	61–1
March 28, 1998	Orlando, FL	Universal Studios	WCW Worldwide	Johnny Swinger	Won by pinfall	62–1
March 28, 1998	Auburn Hills, MI	Palace	WCW house show	Jerry Flynn	Won by pinfall	63–1
March 29, 1998	Milwaukee, WI		WCW house show	Jerry Flynn	Won by pinfall	64–1
March 30, 1998	Chicago, IL	United Center	WCW Nitro	Ray Traylor	Won by pinfall	65–1
April 2, 1998	Tampa, FL	Ice Palace	WCW Thunder	Jerry Flynn	Won by pinfall	66–1
April 3, 1998	Orlando, FL	Universal Studios	WCW Worldwide	Jerry Flynn	Won by pinfall	67–1
April 4, 1998	Orlando, FL	Universal Studios	WCW Worldwide	Terrance Black	Won by pinfall	68–1
April 4, 1998	Orlando, FL	Universal Studios	WCW Worldwide	John Nord	Won by pinfall	69–1
April 4, 1998	Orlando, FL	Universal Studios	WCW Worldwide	Bobby Blaze	Won by pinfall	70–1
April 4, 1998	Orlando, FL	Universal Studios	WCW Worldwide	Jerry Flynn	Won by pinfall	71–1
April 6, 1998	Miami, FL	Miami Arena	WCW Nitro	Van Hammer	Won by pinfall	72–1
April 10, 1998	Montgomery, AL		WCW house show	Fit Finlay	Won by pinfall	73–1
April 11, 1998	Chattanooga, TN	UTC Arena	WCW house show	Fit Finlay	Won by pinfall	74–1
April 13, 1998	Minneapolis, MN	Target Center	WCW Nitro	Rocco Rock	Won by pinfall	75–1
April 14, 1998	Mankato, MN		WCW Saturday Night	Van Hammer	Won by pinfall	76–1
April 16, 1998	Fargo, ND	FargoDome	WCW Thunder	Barry Darsow	Won by pinfall	77–1
April 19, 1998	Denver, CO	Coliseum	WCW Spring Stampede 98	Perry Saturn	Won by pinfall	78–1
April 20, 1998	Colorado Springs, CO	World Arena	WCW Nitro	Raven	Won by pinfall	79–1
April 22, 1998	Columbia, SC	Carolina Coliseum	WCW Thunder	Mike Enos	Won by pinfall	80–1
April 27, 1998	Norfolk, VA	Scope	WCW Nitro	Scott Norton	Won by pinfall	81–1
April 27, 1998	Norfolk, VA	Scope	WCW Nitro	Jerry Flynn	Won by pinfall	82–1
April 28, 1998	Salisbury, MD		WCW house show	Scott Norton	Won by pinfall	83–1
May 5, 1998	Springfield, IL		WCW Saturday Night	Van Hammer	Won by pinfall	84–1
May 5, 1998	Springfield, IL		WCW Saturday Night	Yuji Nagata	Won by pinfall	85–1
May 6, 1998	Des Moines, IA	Veterans Memorial Coliseum	WCW house show	Perry Saturn	Won by pinfall	86–1
May 9, 1998	Wichita, KS		WCW house show	Perry Saturn	Won by pinfall	87–1
May 11, 1998	Kansas City, MO	Kemper Arena	WCW Nitro	Len Denton	Won by pinfall	88–1
May 14, 1998	Durham, NH	Whittemore Center Arena	WCW Thunder	Sick Boy	Won by pinfall	89–1
May 15, 1998	Bangor, ME		WCW house show	Perry Saturn	Won by pinfall	90–1
May 16, 1998	Amherst, MA	Mullins Center	WCW house show	Perry Saturn	Won by pinfall	91–1
May 17, 1998	Worcester, MA	Centrum	WCW Slamboree 98	Perry Saturn	Won by pinfall	92–1
May 18, 1998	Providence, RI	Civic Center	WCW Nitro	Glacier	Won by pinfall	93–1
May 25, 1998	Evansville, IN	Roberts Municipal Auditorium	WCW Nitro	Johnny Attitude	Won by pinfall	94–1
May 26, 1998	Memphis, TN	Mid-South Coliseum	WCW house show	Perry Saturn	Won by pinfall	95–1
May 27, 1998	Nashville, TN	Municipal Auditorium	WCW Thunder	Barry Horowitz	Won by pinfall	96–1
June 1, 1998	Washington, DC	MCI Center	WCW Nitro	La Parka	Won by pinfall	97–1
June 4, 1998	Peoria, IL	Civic Center	WCW Thunder	Hugh Morrus & Barbarian	Won by pinfall	98–1
June 5, 1998	Muncie, IN		WCW house show	Perry Saturn	Won by pinfall	99–1
June 6, 1998	Fort Wayne, IN		WCW house show	Perry Saturn	Won by pinfall	100–1
June 7, 1998	Grand Rapids, MI	Van Andel Arena	WCW house show	Perry Saturn	Won by pinfall	101–1
June 8, 1998	Auburn Hills, MI	The Palace	WCW Nitro	Chavo Guerrero Jr.	Won by pinfall	102–1
June 9, 1998	Saginaw, MI	Civic Center	WCW Saturday Night	Raven	Won by pinfall	103–1
June 13, 1998	Pittsburgh, PA		WCW house show	Konnan	Won by pinfall	104–1
June 13, 1998	Pittsburgh, PA		WCW house show	Sting	Won by pinfall	105–1
June 14, 1998	Baltimore, MD	Arena	WCW Great American Bash 98	Konnan	Won by pinfall	106–1
June 17, 1998	Philadelphia, PA	Corestates Spectrum	WCW Thunder	Reese	Won by pinfall	107–1
June 22, 1998	Jacksonville, FL	Coliseum	WCW Nitro	Rick Fuller	Won by pinfall	108–1
June 24, 1998	Orlando, FL		WCW Thunder dark match	Fit Finlay	Won by pinfall	109–1
June 29, 1998	Tampa, FL	Ice Palace	WCW Nitro	Glacier	Won by pinfall	110–1
July 6, 1998	Atlanta, GA	Georgia Dome	WCW Nitro	Scott Hall	Won by pinfall	111–1
July 6, 1998	Atlanta, GA	Georgia Dome	WCW Nitro	Hollywood Hogan	Won by pinfall	112–1
July 7, 1998	Macon, GA	Coliseum	WCW Saturday Night	Scott Hall	Won by pinfall	113–1
July 8, 1998	Birmingham, AL	BJCC	WCW Thunder dark match	Scott Hall	Won by pinfall	114–1
July 10, 1998	Inglewood, CA	Great Western Forum	WCW LA Melee	Curt Hennig	Won by pinfall	115–1
July 12, 1998	San Diego, CA	Cox Arena	WCW Bash at the Beach 98	Curt Hennig	Won by pinfall	116–1
July 13, 1998	Las Vegas, NV	MGM Grand	WCW Nitro	Curt Hennig	Won by pinfall	117–1
July 16, 1998	Oakland, CA	Coliseum	WCW Thunder dark match	The Giant	Won by pinfall	118–1
July 17, 1998	Sacramento, CA		WCW house show	Curt Hennig	Won by pinfall	119–1
July 18, 1998	Spokane, WA		WCW house show	Curt Hennig	Won by pinfall	120–1
July 19, 1998	Yakima, WA	Sun Dome	WCW house show	Curt Hennig	Won by pinfall	121–1
July 20, 1998	Salt Lake City, UT	E Center	WCW Nitro dark match	The Giant	Won by pinfall	122–1
July 26, 1998	New York City, NY	Goodwill Games	WCW house show	Curt Hennig	Won by pinfall	123–1
July 27, 1998	San Antonio, TX	AlamoDome	WCW Nitro	Brian Adams	Won by pinfall	124–1
July 27, 1998	San Antonio, TX	AlamoDome	WCW Nitro dark match	The Giant	Won by pinfall	125–1
August 3, 1998	Denver, CO	Coliseum	WCW Nitro dark match	The Giant	Won by pinfall	126–1
August 5, 1998	Casper, WY	Events Center	WCW Thunder dark match	The Giant	Won by pinfall	127–1
August 8, 1998	Sturgis, SD	Sturgis Rally & Race	WCW Road Wild 98	The Giant	Won by pinfall	128–1
August 10, 1998	Rapid City, SD	Rushmore Plaza Civic Center	WCW Nitro	Meng	Won by pinfall	129–1
August 13, 1998	Fargo, ND	FargoDome	WCW Thunder dark match	The Giant	Won by pinfall	130–1
August 17, 1998	Hartford, CT	Civic Center	WCW Nitro	The Giant	Won by DQ	131–1
August 26, 1998	Peoria, IL	Civic Center	WCW Thunder dark match	The Giant	Won by pinfall	132–1
August 31, 1998	Miami, FL	Miami Arena	WCW Nitro	Al Green	Won by pinfall	133–1
September 7, 1998	Pensacola, FL		WCW Nitro	Scott Putski	Won by pinfall	134–1
September 10, 1998	Lexington, KY	Rupp Arena	WCW Thunder	Rick Fuller	Won by pinfall	135–1
September 11, 1998	Cincinnati, OH		WCW house show	The Giant	Won by pinfall	136–1
September 14, 1998	Greenville, SC	BiLo Center	WCW Nitro	Sting	Won by pinfall	137–1
September 24, 1998	Norfolk, VA	Scope	WCW Thunder	Chris Kanyon	Won by pinfall	138–1
September 24, 1998	Norfolk, VA	Scope	WCW Thunder	Raven	Won by pinfall	139–1
September 25, 1998	Baltimore, MD	Arena	WCW house show	The Giant	Won by pinfall	140–1
September 26, 1998	Fairfax, VA	Patriot Center	WCW house show	Sting	Won by pinfall	141–1
October 1, 1998	Norfolk, VA		WCW Thunder	Raven	Won by pinfall	142–1
October 5, 1998	Columbia, SC	Carolina Coliseum	WCW Nitro	Disco Inferno	Won by pinfall	143–1
October 10, 1998	Dayton, OH		WCW house show	The Giant	Won by pinfall	144–1
October 10, 1998	Columbus, OH		WCW house show	The Giant	Won by pinfall	145–1
October 11, 1998	Milwaukee, WI		WCW house show	The Giant	Won by pinfall	146–1
October 12, 1998	Chicago, IL	United Center	WCW Nitro	The Giant	Won by countout	147–1
October 20, 1998	Mankato, MN		WCW Thunder dark match	Meng	Won by pinfall	148–1
October 21, 1998	Duluth, MN	DecC	WCW house show	Scott Hall	Won by pinfall	149–1
October 25, 1998	Las Vegas, NV	MGM Grand	WCW Halloween Havoc 98	Diamond Dallas Page	Won by pinfall	150–1
November 6, 1998	Charleston, WV	Civic Center	WCW house show	The Giant	Won by pinfall	151–1
November 7, 1998	Pittsburgh, PA	Palumbo Center	WCW house show	The Giant	Won by pinfall	152–1
November 8, 1998	Johnstown, PA		WCW house show	The Giant	Won by pinfall	153–1
November 9, 1998	Long Island, NY	Nassau Coliseum	WCW Nitro	Meng	Won by pinfall	154–1
November 12, 1998	Roanoke, VA	Roanoke Civic Center	WCW Thunder dark match	The Giant	Won by pinfall	155–1
November 23, 1998	Grand Rapids, MI	Van Andel Arena	WCW Nitro	The Giant	Won by pinfall	156–1
December 7, 1998	Houston, TX	AstroDome	WCW Nitro	Bam Bam Bigelow	No Contest	156–1
December 14, 1998	Tampa, FL	Ice Palace	WCW Nitro	Kevin Nash & Bam Bam Bigelow	Won by DQ	157–1
December 18, 1998	Tulsa, OK		WCW house show	The Giant	Won by pinfall	158–1
December 19, 1998	Springfield, MO		WCW house show	The Giant	Won by pinfall	159–1
December 20, 1998	Kansas City, MO	Kemper Arena	WCW house show	Bam Bam Bigelow	Won by pinfall	160–1
December 21, 1998	St Louis, MO	TWA Dome	WCW Nitro	Scott Hall	Won by pinfall	161–1
December 27, 1998	Washington, DC	MCI Center	WCW Starrcade 98	Kevin Nash	Lost by pinfall	161–2

== Aftermath ==
Following the loss, Goldberg was booked against another wrestler who was enjoying an inflated win streak in Sid Vicious and challenged him to a match to end Sid's winning streak. The two feuded with each other, which culminated in a match at Halloween Havoc for Sid's United States Heavyweight Championship. Goldberg defeated Sid via referee stoppage, and thus won his second United States Heavyweight Championship. The following year, the streak came up again when Goldberg feuded with Vince Russo, who gave him an ultimatum. If Goldberg was to lose another match at any point in time, unless he managed to duplicate his undefeated streak from 1997 to 1998, he would be forced to retire from professional wrestling. Goldberg defeated KroniK (Brian Adams and Bryan Clark) at Halloween Havoc in a handicap elimination match. He then started a feud with Lex Luger. This culminated in a match at Mayhem, which Goldberg won. They continued their rivalry and battled in a rematch at Starrcade. Goldberg won the match, but afterwards he was attacked by Luger's partner Buff Bagwell. Goldberg feuded with both Luger and Bagwell, who called themselves "Totally Buffed". His streak was broken at Sin when Goldberg, teaming with his Power Plant trainer DeWayne Bruce, lost to Totally Buffed in a tag team no disqualification match after a "fan" maced him, enabling Totally Buffed to pin him. The storyline was intended to enable Goldberg to have shoulder surgery, but WCW was sold to the WWF in March 2001, while Goldberg was still recuperating.

== Validity of the streak ==
Goldberg's win–loss record at WCW events from 1997 to 1998 differed from that which was perpetuated by the company, with the official figure exaggerating the number of matches in which he won to 173. Nick Schwartz of Fox Sports wrote: "No one really knows what Goldberg's actual record was... but it's generally accepted that 173–0 is an inflated number." Some of Goldberg's industry peers stated that the figure was exaggerated. His then-WCW colleague Chris Jericho stated: "One week he'd be 42–0 and seven days later he'd be 58–0. Did stepping on bugs count?" Jimmy Hart, a manager who also worked with Goldberg in WCW, regarded the level of embellishment as "kind of funny", while professional wrestler The Miz said: "The number would just go on and on and on, to where it was like, 'Wait a second. How did he get this many wins in such a short time'?" This exaggeration damaged the streak's credibility among the WCW audience; upon noticing that the figure had been falsified, fans began to withdraw homemade signs trumpeting Goldberg's record.

== Legacy ==
Although André the Giant was billed by the WWF as being undefeated for 15 years, the Goldberg Win Streak was the first lengthy televised win streak used to build a main eventer out of a new character. It is now part and parcel of the Hall of Fame legacy of the Goldberg character, and similar efforts were used to build the characters of Brock Lesnar in 2002, Umaga in 2006, Ryback in 2012, Bo Dallas in 2014 (albeit in a more comical manner), and Asuka in 2017. Conversely, Curt Hawkins used a losing streak as a gimmick, losing 269 matches in a row before finally winning at WrestleMania 35 by winning the Raw Tag Team Championship alongside Zack Ryder against The Revival.

== See also ==
- The Streak, The Undertaker's win streak at WrestleMania
