= Skip Young (wrestler) =

American professional wrestler (1951 – 2010)

- Young as Sweet Brown Sugar, c. 1981

Personal information
- Born: Galton W. Young; July 24, 1951 Houston, Texas, U.S.
- Died: December 3, 2010 (aged 59) Dallas, Texas, U.S.

Professional wrestling career
- Ring name(s): Skip Young; Super Bad; Sweet Brown Sugar
- Billed height: 6 ft 1 in (185 cm)
- Billed weight: 220 lb (100 kg)
- Debut: 1975
- Retired: 1997

Galton W. Young, better known as Skip Young and Sweet Brown Sugar (July 24, 1951 – December 3, 2010) was an American professional wrestler who competed on the Southeastern regional promotions during the late 1970s and throughout the 1980s in Florida Championship Wrestling, World Class Championship Wrestling and the National Wrestling Alliance.

== Professional wrestling career ==
After making his debut in Florida Championship Wrestling, Skip Young originally wrestled as the masked "Sweet Brown Sugar" winning the NWA Florida Southern Heavyweight Championship three times between 1979 and 1982. He also formed a successful tag team with Butch Reed in the Florida region winning the NWA North American Tag Team titles in April 1982.

During the early 1980s, he also toured Japan most notably facing Genichiro Tenryu and Ashura Hara in a tag team match with The Destroyer in Tokyo, Japan, on January 3, 1982.

Skip Young had a couple of runs in Puerto Rico with the World Wrestling Council, he went to the ring wearing a hat of a Puerto Rican flag. On many interviews Skip Young said he loved the Puerto Rican culture.

After leaving the Florida region in 1984, Young began wrestling unmasked in the Texas-area where he began teaming with "Pistol" Pez Whatley and feuded with the PYT Express although he would later win the WCWA Tag Team titles with "Mr. USA" Tony Atlas in 1987.

Young retired from wrestling in 1997.

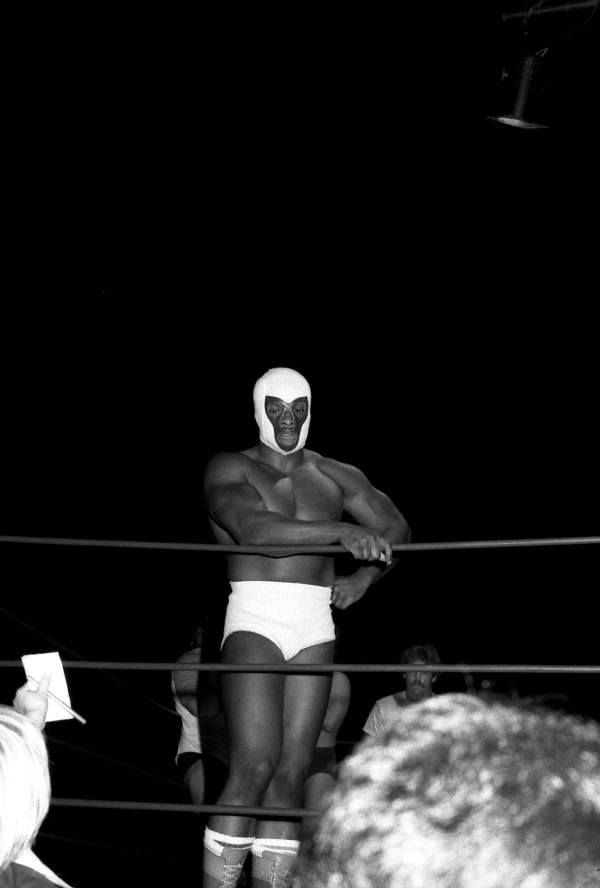
Sweet Brown Sugar in 1979.

== Death ==
Young died on December 3, 2010, at 59.

== Championships and accomplishments ==
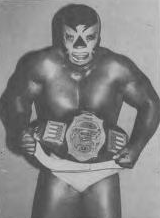
Young with the NWA Southern Heavyweight Championship, c. 1981

- Championship Wrestling from Florida
  - NWA Florida Bahamian Championship (1 time)
  - NWA Florida Television Championship (1 time)
  - NWA North American Tag Team Championship (Florida version) (1 time) - with Butch Reed
  - NWA Southern Heavyweight Championship (Florida version) (3 times)
- Pro Wrestling Illustrated
  - PWI ranked him #252 of the 500 best singles wrestlers in the PWI 500 in 1991
  - PWI Rookie of the Year (1979)
- World Class Championship Wrestling / World Class Wrestling Association
  - NWA Texas Tag Team Championship (1 time) - with Kerry Von Erich (1)
  - WCWA Texas Tag Team Championship (1 time) - with Tony Atlas
- World Wrestling Council
  - WWC Television Championship (1 time)
