= Barry Horowitz =

American professional wrestler (born 1960)

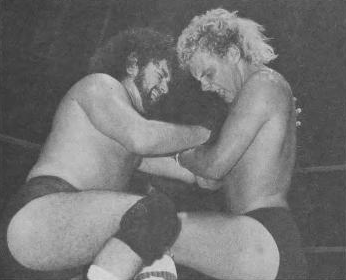
- Horowitz (Left) Wrestling Kendall Windham (Right)

Personal information
- Born: March 24, 1960 (age 66) St. Petersburg, Florida, U.S.
- Education: Florida State University

Professional wrestling career
- Ring name(s): Barry Hart; Barry Horowitz; Brett Hart; Jack Hart; The Red Knight
- Billed height: 6 ft 0 in (183 cm)
- Billed weight: 221 lb (100 kg)
- Trained by: Boris Malenko
- Debut: 1979
- Retired: January 21, 2023

Barry Horowitz (born March 24, 1960) is an American professional wrestler, best known for his time in the World Wrestling Federation (WWF).

== Early life ==
Horowitz attended Florida State University, where he studied sports nutrition and wrestled. He is Jewish.

== Professional wrestling career ==
=== Early career (1979–1981) ===
Horowitz trained as a professional wrestler under Boris Malenko in Tampa, Florida, for 18 months and debuted in 1979 on the Floridian independent circuit. He went on to work for the World Wide Wrestling Federation, Jim Crockett, Sr.'s NWA Mid-Atlantic promotion, and promotions in Canada and Puerto Rico.

=== World Wrestling Federation (1981–1983) ===
His first television appearance in the WWF came at a television taping for Championship Wrestling in Allentown, PA. Making his debut on the October 24, 1981, episode as an enhancement talent named Barry Hart, he was defeated by King Kong Angelo Mosca. He next faced Intercontinental Champion The Magnificent Muraco on All-Star Wrestling, and would later fall to Jesse Ventura, Adrian Adonis, and Greg Valentine. His first taste of success came on November 28, 1981, when he battled Jerry Johnson to a draw at an event in Poughkeepsie, New York.

As Barry Hart he became a fixture on WWF cards in 1982, facing Tony Altomare, Bulldog Brower, Jose Estrada, Adrian Adonis, Charlie Fulton, and a host of other performers during the year. On March 9 he competed against Jimmy Snuka on the March 13 episode of Championship Wrestling; Hart was defeated and did a stretcher job. Six months after his WWF debut, Hart scored his first victory when he defeated Charlie Brown at a house show in Highland Park, NJ on April 22. After another series of losses that would see him fall to Buddy Rose, Billy Graham, Swede Hanson, and Dick Beyer, Hart secured his second victory when he defeated Frank Williams in Harrisburg, PA on October 15, 1982. Ten days later he defeated Jeff Craney in Scranton, PA, but closed out the year with losses too Big John Studd, Charlie Fulton, and Bob Bradley.

Hart opened 1983 with a defeat to Big John Studd on Championship Wrestling, followed by losses to Mr. Fuji, Ivan Koloff, and Iron Mike Sharpe. In March 1983 he engaged in a house show series with Johnny Rodz. After battling Bob Bradley to another draw on May 17, he twice wrestled Wild Samoan Savage (Tama) to a draw later that month, as well as a draw against Pete Doherty. His final match of his first WWF run came on May 30, 1983, when he wrestled Tony Colon on a televised match.

=== Mid Atlantic Championship Wrestling (1983–1984) ===
Two days later Horowitz jumped to Mid-Atlantic Championship Wrestling. Now wrestling as Brett Hart (not to be confused with Bret Hart), he was defeated by Greg Valentine in his television debut. He was initially used in similar fashion as in the WWF; Hart would fall to Gene Anderson, Kelly Kiniski, Bill White, Terry Funk, and others as his run progressed. His first victory came on July 24, 1983, when he defeated Tom Lintz at an event in Asheville, NC. After a loss to Jake Roberts, he rebounded to defeat Golden Boy Grey, Bill Howard, and Joel Deaton in August 1983. He began to move up the card, defeating Kelly Kiniski and The Ninja (Mr Pogo) in September. In November, Hart formed a team with Rick McCord and would face The Brisco Brothers in multiple encounters that month on MACW television, as well as The Assassins. As the winter began he continued to accumulate wins, defeating Jerry Grey in multiple encounters.

1984 began with a televised loss to Ivan Koloff on January 1, but Hart rebounded to beat Ben Alexander, Ali Bey, and Gary Royal. In February he changed his name back to Barry Hart, defeating Brickhouse Brown on February 12, 1984, at a house show in Roanoke, VA. However, despite numerous victories against undercard wrestlers he was unable to break through to the upper tier, losing matches to Stan Hansen, Tully Blanchard, and a rookie Nikita Koloff. Towards the end of the summer Hart formed a team with Sam Houston, facing The Long Riders (Black Bart & Ron Bass) and The Russians (Ivan & Nikita Koloff). In September 1984 the duo began a house show series with The Zambuie Express (Elijah Akeem & Kareem Muhammad). On November 15, 1984, at a Pro Wrestling USA event, Houston & Hart challenged The Long Riders for the NWA Mid-Atlantic Tag-Team Championship but were unsuccessful. Hart closed out his MACW run on December 1, 1984, defeating The Inferno at a house show in Morgantown, NC.

=== Championship Wrestling from Florida (1984–1987) ===
Horowitz then jumped to Championship Wrestling from Florida, making his debut at a TV event on December 26, 1984. Now wrestling as Jack Hart, he was defeated by Brian Blair. After defeating Mike Golden on December 30, he formed a team with his opponent and challenged The Youngbloods (Mark Youngblood & Jay Youngblood) for the NWA Florida United States Tag-Team Championship on January 9, 1985. On April 14, 1985, he faced NWA Florida Heavyweight Champion Jesse Barr but was unsuccessful. A week later he challenged NWA Florida Southern Heavyweight Champion Brian Blair at an event in Orlando, FL but was defeated.

In July 1985 the NWA Florida Heavyweight Championship. had been vacated with a tournament held to crown a new champion. Hart defeated Coco Samoa in the first round on July 23; later that night he defeated Mike Graham to win his first singles championship. He held the title until September 2, 1985, when he lost to Kendall Windham at Battle of the Belts. He remained in CWF for two years, and was managed by heels such as Percy Pringle and Sir Oliver Humperdink.

=== World Wrestling Federation (1987–1990) ===
Horowitz joined the World Wrestling Federation on January 24, 1987, when he faced Brad Rheingans at a house show in Detroit, MI; however, he would not appear on television until the July 25 episode of WWF Superstars of Wrestling when he competed against Koko B. Ware. Wearing suspenders and a vest with an outline of a handprint on the back, which he patted as a self-congratulatory measure, he spent three years in the WWF as an enhancement talent (primarily against up and coming babyfaces). Horowitz became a full-time member of the roster, competing not only on television but also on house shows, and quickly entered house show series in the summer of 1987 with Brady Boone and the newly arrived Dingo Warrior (soon to be renamed Ultimate Warrior). Horowitz faced much of the WWF roster in his first year, competing against Paul Orndorff, Chavo Guerrero, Sam Houston, Bam Bam Bigelow, Don Muraco, and many others. On the November 8, 1987 edition of WWF Superstars of Wrestling he faced The Ultimate Warrior on one of the latter's first televised appearances. Although Horowitz's win years later over BodyDonna Skip was promoted as his first victory, he did have numerous pinfall victories during his first WWF run. The first was in Kitchener, Ontario, on July 22, 1987, over Brady Boone. That year he would also pin Lanny Poffo, David Sammartino, Sivi Afi, and Jerry Allen.

Horowitz began 1988 with a loss to Lanny Poffo at a house show in Indianapolis, IN on January 2. He next appeared on television, falling to Randy Savage on WWF Prime Time Wrestling. He continued a lengthy house show series with Outback Jack as well as face David Sammartino. On March 8, 1988, Horowitz faced Owen Hart in the latter's WWF tryout in a dark match for a Wrestling Challenge taping in Bristol, TN. On April 24 in Landover, MD Horowitz pinned Jose Luis Rivera, and on May 2 he gained his first televised victory when he pinned Rivera again, this time on Prime Time Wrestling. After televised defeats to Ken Patera and Sam Houston, he rebounded to defeat Scott Casey on May 19, 1988 in Kansas City, MO. Overall for the year, Horowitz registered fifteen singles victories, defeating Allen, DJ Peterson, Jose Luis Rivera, Iron Mike Sharpe, and Poffo. As the fall began Horowitz pivoted to a lengthy house show series with the now signed Owen Hart, who was wrestling as The Blue Blazer. On the September 20th edition of Prime Time Wrestling the Blue Blazer defeated Horowitz on television. On the November 26th edition of Superstars of Wrestling, Horowitz faced WWF Intercontinental Champion The Ultimate Warrior but was unsuccessful.

Horowitz opened 1989 with a defeat to Tim Horner at a house show on January 1 in Auburn Hills, MI. On January 15th he appeared at the 1989 Royal Rumble PPV, losing to Sam Houston in a dark match. Horowitz continued to be featured on television, facing much of the WWF babyface roster with matches including Rick Martel, Bret Hart, Jake Roberts, Sam Houston, Hillbilly Jim, The Red Rooster, Tito Santana, Koko B. Ware, Jim Neidhart, Jimmy Snuka, and Dusty Rhodes, amongst others. On August 9, 1989 he faced Brian Adams (the future Demolition Crush) in a dark match on Wrestling Challenge, and on the October 1st episode of Challenge he was defeated by Roddy Piper. On the October 3rd edition of Challenge he faced two other wrestlers participating in dark matches; facing Al Perez and Tugboat. As the fall began, Horowitz engaged in a house show series with Tugboat prior to the latter's WWF debut, and would also face Perez multiple times.

As with the previous year, Horowitz registered multiple victories in 1989, including an improbable pin over a young Ken Shamrock in Greensboro, North Carolina, on July 29. Barry would also defeat Scott Casey, Mike Reskin, Mark Young, Jeff Bronsky, Louie Spicolli and The Blue Blazer on house shows, and pin Dusty Wolfe on the May 22, 1989 episode of Prime Time Wrestling

He began 1990 with a house show encounter with Koko B. Ware on January 1 in Marion, IN and would continue to face "The Birdman" on various live events during the winter. His final WWF match came on April 22, 1990 when he was defeated by Mark Young in Waco, TX, after which he departed for World Championship Wrestling.

==== Tag-Team with Steve Lombardi ====
Horowitz occasionally teamed with another preliminary wrestler, Steve Lombardi (the "Brooklyn Brawler"). Their first match came on the July 26, 1987, episode of Wrestling Challenge, where they were defeated by The Young Stallions. On August 21, 1987, they secured their first victory, defeating Sivi Afi & Scott Casey at a house show in Detroit, MI. This was followed a day later by a win over Afi & Casey in Landover, MD. In one house show event, Horowitz and Lombardi defeated Jerry Allen and Scott Hall in Springfield, Massachusetts on August 23, 1987. In the fall the duo would enter a house show series with the Young Stallions. On the December 5th edition of WWF Superstars of Wrestling Lombardi & Horowitz would face The British Bulldogs, but were defeated.

The duo began the new year with a defeat to The Young Stallions at a house show in Wildwood, NJ on January 9, 1988. The team rebounded to defeat Lanny Poffo and Scott Casey on January 26, 1988, in Hershey, Pennsylvania. The match would later air on an episode of Primetime Wrestling on February 19, 1988. Three days later on Prime Time Wrestling they would fall to The Killer Bees, and on February 27 on Wrestling Spotlight and March 14th on Prime TimeLombardi & Sharpe would again fall to the Stallions. The two teams squared off again on the April 30 episode of WWF Superstars, with Roma & Powers again winning. On June 26, 1988 the duo were defeated by The British Bulldogs on Prime Time Wrestling, and then resumed their series with the Young Stallions that summer on the house show circuit. The duo closed out the year with a loss on the December 4th edition of Wrestling Challenge to The Rockers.

=== World Championship Wrestling (1990) ===
Horowitz made his debut in WCW a little over a month later at a TV taping on May 23, 1990, at the Georgia Mountains Center in a match with Brian Pillman. He would wrestle in over fifty matches that year, registering one victory (a pinfall of Tommy Angel at a TV taping in October). His only pay-per-view appearance was in a dark match at Halloween Havoc, where he was defeated by Tim Horner. His last appearance came on December 7 at a house show in St. Joseph, Missouri, where he wrestled twice, losing to The Juicer and Sam Houston in subsequent matches.

=== Global Wrestling Federation (1991–1993) ===
Following a one-off appearance for the Universal Wrestling Federation in April 1991, Horowitz traveled to Texas, where he worked for the newly formed Global Wrestling Federation. He made his debut on August 16, 1991 in a match against The Patriot. Competing in the light-heavyweight division, Horowitz (billed as Barry "the Winner" Horowitz) won the GWF Light Heavyweight Championship on two occasions within the space of a month in 1992, defeating Jerry Lynn on February 7 and Ben Jordan on February 28 in Dallas, Texas. He remained in the GWF for two years until it declared bankruptcy.

=== Return to WWF (1991–1997) ===
==== Jobber to the stars (1991–1995) ====
Along the way, Horowitz also returned to the WWF in late 1991, where he was once again used to help put talent over. His first match back came on October 21 at a WWF Superstars taping in Fort Wayne, Indiana, when he teamed with Brian Costello to face The Bushwhackers. For the remainder of 1991, Horowitz only appeared on televised events and came out on the losing end in matches against Legion of Doom, Greg Valentine, and then Intercontinental champion Bret Hart. This continued through the first half of 1992, and Horowitz would face and lose to Kerry Von Erich, Owen Hart, Tito Santana, and others at WWF Superstars and WWF Challenge tapings.

On June 5, 1992, in Chicago, Illinois, Horowitz rejoined the house show circuit, substituting for the departed Colonel Mustafa in a series against Kerry Von Erich. He also faced Tito Santana, coming out winless on each occasion. In September he began teaming with Skinner in a house show program against High Energy (Koko B. Ware and Owen Hart). Horowitz would remain winless in his WWF return until September 21, 1992, when he finally secured his first pinfall victory by defeating Brad Holman in a dark match at a WWF Superstars taping in Winnipeg, Manitoba. It would be his only victory of the year.

In Phoenix, Arizona he teamed with Reno Riggins against The Smoking Gunns on April 5, 1993, in the latter team's WWF debut. Horowitz would later lose to Riggins in a Wrestling Challenge dark match on June 14 in Columbus, Ohio. On July 5, 1993, he gained his second victory, defeating Phil Apollo at a Monday Night Raw taping, then followed it up two days later by pinning Chuck Williams in a dark match taping at Wrestling Challenge. After several more losses, Horowitz appeared at SummerSlam when he lost to Owen Hart in a dark match. A month later, Horowitz gained another pair of victories in television dark matches, defeating Mike Davis and Scott Taylor. In November Horowitz made his pay-per-view debut under a mask at the 1993 Survivor Series as the Red Knight, teaming with Shawn Michaels (who was substituting for Jerry Lawler) and the Black and Blue Knights to lose to Bret, Owen, Keith, and Bruce Hart. Following the pay-per-view, Horowitz began teaming with his old partner, Lombardi, as The Red and Black Knights on the house show circuit, losing to Men on a Mission multiple times in December.

Despite his status as a jobber, Horowitz would occasionally wrestle in matches of greater prominence. He was instrumental in starting the feud between reigning tag team champions, The Quebecers, and the "1-2-3" Kid. The Quebecers were set to defend their titles against Horowitz and Riggins, but Horowitz brought in the Kid as a last-minute replacement partner. Though the Quebecers prevailed in the match, the Kid would continue to challenge for the tag team titles, albeit with changing partners and without Horowitz. Horowitz would return to teaming with Riggins during 1994, facing The Smoking Gunns and Men on a Mission on multiple occasions. Despite numerous defeats, Horowitz did gain two victories in 1994 by defeating Ben Jordan and Mark Thomas. He also faced Thurman "Sparky" Plugg in the latter's first WWF match.

Horowitz entered 1995 still mired in the preliminary ranks and lost to Chris Candido in the soon to be BodyDonna Skip's first match. However, Bodydonna Skip was the catalyst for a career turnaround that summer. Horowitz's schedule began to pick up and he wrestled Henry Godwinn, Mantaur, Shawn Michaels, and others. On the March 13, 1995, episode of Monday Night Raw, Horowitz received a shot at Jeff Jarrett's Intercontinental Championship. It was a competitive match, but Horowitz lost via submission to Jarrett's figure-four leg lock. On May 25, 1995, in Manitoba he began a house show series against Skip of the Body Donnas, losing to him all seven times.

==== Elevation to main roster and teaming with Hakushi (1995–1997) ====
Finally, on the July 9, 1995, airing of Wrestling Challenge, Horowitz received the first push of his WWF career, beginning with pinning Bodydonna Skip in a three-quarter nelson to gain his first win over a WWF star on television, leading to commentator Jim Ross shouting "Horowitz beat him!" into his microphone in disbelief. Horowitz faced Skip on the August 5 episode of WWF Superstars after the Body Donna said that Horowitz could not last ten minutes in a match. Horowitz avoided a pinfall for the ten minutes, leading to a third televised match between them at SummerSlam 1995. Horowitz won this encounter, gaining his first ever pay-per-view victory. These wins led to Horowitz becoming a popular underdog with WWF fans. During this time, the WWF played up Horowitz's Jewish heritage, introducing a Star of David on his wrestling trunks and making his entrance theme an upbeat version of the Jewish folk song "Hava Nagila". The character was also developed with the portrayal of Horowitz as a stereotypical nerd when not wrestling, showing Horowitz with large glasses, dress shirts buttoned up all the way, and a pocket protector. Horowitz formed a tag team with the newly turned face Hakushi–whom he attempted to Americanize (as shown in a series of vignettes with Horowitz describing American culture and institutions to Hakushi) after beating him in another upset. At the 1995 Survivor Series, they teamed with Bob Holly and Marty Jannetty in a loss to Skip, Rad Radford, Tom Prichard, and The 1-2-3 Kid. A month later at In Your House 5 Horowitz teamed with Hakushi and The Smoking Gunns to defeat The Body Donnas, Yokozuna, and Isaac Yankem in a dark match at the pay-per-view. He closed out the year teaming frequently with Fatu and Hakushi and coming out victorious over Skip, Kama, and Yankem on the house show circuit.

In early 1996, Horwitz moved on from the feud with Skip (who was put in a tag team with Zip) and appeared in the 1996 Royal Rumble match, as the 25th entrant, where he was eliminated by Owen Hart. However, despite his elevation in the roster, Horowitz quickly returned to a long losing streak, being defeated by Stone Cold Steve Austin, Hunter Hearst Helmsley, Duke Droese, and Savio Vega in January and February. He rebounded to defeat Isaac Yankem in Hartford, Connecticut on March 15, but then entered another losing streak that would not end until May 28, when he upset Owen Hart after the referee reversed the decision. Horowitz then went on another long streak, falling to Faarooq, Goldust, and Salvatore Sincere. His final televised match came on April 7, 1997, when he teamed with Freddie Joe Floyd against The Headbangers on Monday Night Raw. His last WWF match was in Kuwait City, Kuwait on April 12, 1997, against Floyd.

=== Return to WCW (1997–2000) ===
Horowitz's contract was not renewed by the WWF in 1997, and he joined World Championship Wrestling in October 1997, wrestling Disco Inferno on WCW Saturday Night. He signed a two-year contract and wrestled primarily on Saturday Night, but also had numerous house show appearances. He sustained losses to Disco Inferno, Wrath, Chris Adams, Alex Wright, Vincent, and others during 1998. He was also part of Bill Goldberg's undefeated streak, losing to him on January 10, 1998, on WCW Saturday Night and later on May 27, 1998, on WCW Thunder - where he had his first and only shot at the WCW United States Championship. On January 17, 1998, on WCW WorldWide, he beat Hardbody Harrison. On October 20, 1998, Horowitz gained his second victory in his WCW return (albeit via disqualification) in a match against Barry Darsow at a television taping in Mankato, Minnesota. On November 22, 1998, he made his first pay-per-view appearance, wrestling in the three ring, 60-man battle royal at World War 3.

In early 2000, he began his first feud in WCW after losing to Allan Funk on the March 11 edition of Saturday Night. Funk defeated Horowitz using a handful of tights. A week later on Saturday Night during a match between Fidel Sierra and Funk, Horowitz came out to the ring and distracted Funk, allowing Sierra to win. Horowitz's final WCW appearance came at the last ever taping of Saturday Night on March 29, 2000, in Beaumont, Texas. He faced Jim Duggan and was defeated after Funk interfered. He then left WCW.

=== Later career (2000–2003, 2013) ===
After WCW, he returned to the independent circuit working mainly in Florida until he retired in 2003.

Horowitz made a one-night appearance on June 30, 2013, where he won Malenko Memorial Cup Battle Royal.

=== Return to professional wrestling (2022–2023) ===
After not wrestling since 2013, Horowitz returned to the ring on March 19, 2022, to face Joey Janela at the WrestlePro Rock And Roll Forever event in Rahway, New Jersey. The match was billed as a Rahway street fight. Horowitz was victorious in the match. Later that month, Horowitz wrestled at the WrestleCon Mark Hitchcock Memorial Super Show in Dallas teaming with Dango, Jimmy Wang Yang, nZo, and PCO in a losing effort against Atsushi Onita, Robert Gibson, Ricky Morton, Juice Robinson, and Colt Cabana.

On May 11, 2022, Horowitz appeared in a vignette in All Elite Wrestling in a parody of Dark Side of the Ring in the build-up to the match between MJF and Wardlow. During the vignette, Horowitz (billed as a "Legendary Jewish Wrestler") defended fellow Jewish wrestler MJF while poking fun at himself by saying he's a top star and calling Shawn Dean (who had two disqualification victories over MJF) "a jobber".

On the episode of Impact Wrestling that aired on February 16, 2023 (taped January 21), Horowitz wrestled Johnny Swinger as part of Swinger's quest to get 50 victories. After a distraction by The KISS Demon, Horowitz rolled Swinger up for a pinfall victory. Later in the show, Horowitz teased a shot at the World title if he got 50 victories like the one promised to Swinger but when Impact Director of Authority Santino Marella said his next opponent would be against Rhino, Horowitz decided he wanted to take his one victory and leave on top.

== Popular culture ==
Horowitz is the subject of a song by rapper Action Bronson, though Horowitz was angered by this and indicated that Bronson did not get permission to use his name or likeness.

== Championships and accomplishments ==
- Border City Wrestling
  - BCW Can-Am Tag Team Championship (1 time) – with Otis Apollo
- Catch Wrestling Association
  - CWA World Middleweight Championship (1 time)
- Championship Wrestling from Florida
  - NWA Florida Heavyweight Championship (1 time)
  - NWA Florida Heavyweight Title Tournament (1995)
- Continental Wrestling Association
  - AWA Southern Tag Team Championship (1 time) – with Chick Donovan
- Definitive Wrestling International
  - Malenko Memorial Cup (2013)
- Empire Wrestling Alliance
  - EWA Heavyweight Championship (1 time)
- Future of Wrestling
  - FOW Hardcore Championship (2 times)
- Global Wrestling Federation
  - GWF Light Heavyweight Championship (2 times)
- Independent Association of Wrestling
  - IAW Heavyweight Championship (2 times)
  - IWA Intercontinental Championship (1 time)
- International Wrestling Association
  - IWA United States Heavyweight Championship (1 time)
- Mid-Eastern Wrestling Federation
  - MEWF Mid-Atlantic Championship (1 time)
- New Breed Pro Wrestling
  - NBPW United States Heavyweight Championship (1 time)
- New England Pro Wrestling Hall of Fame
  - Class of 2023
- Pro Wrestling Illustrated
  - Most Inspirational Wrestler of the Year (1995)
  - Ranked No. 114 of the top 500 singles wrestlers in the PWI 500 in 1992
- South Eastern Championship Wrestling
  - SECW Heavyweight Championship (1 time)
  - SECW Television Championship (1 time)
- Other titles
  - RISE Heavyweight Championship (1 time)

== See also ==
- List of Jewish professional wrestlers
