= Pocket protector =

Shirt pocket liner to support writing implements

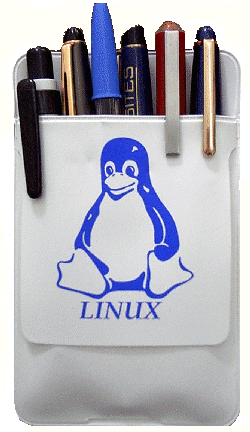
A pocket protector promoting the family of Linux operating systems.

A pocket protector is a sheath designed to hold writing instruments and other small implements in a shirt's breast pocket, protecting it from tearing or staining. It may be used to carry pens, pencils, screwdrivers, small slide rules, and other small items. A flap over the outside of the pocket helps to secure the pocket protector in place. Pocket protectors were originally made of polyvinyl chloride (PVC).

== Invention ==
The pocket protector was invented during World War II by Hurley Smith while he was working in Buffalo, New York. He filed to patent the device on June 3, 1943, and he received patent number US 2417786A on March 18, 1947. By 1949 he was earning enough from pocket protectors to leave his engineering job.

A competing claim for the invention came from Long Island plastics magnate Gerson Strassberg around 1952. Strassberg was working on plastic sleeves for bankbooks. One day, he placed one that he was working on into his shirt pocket while he took a phone call. When he noticed it there, he realized it would make a great product.

== Use ==
Pocket protectors imprinted with logos or company names were first marketed to companies as promotional merchandise. A more general market soon arose, made up of students, engineers, and white-collar workers in a variety of fields. They have become part of a "nerd" or "geek" fashion stereotype, probably because of their association with engineers or students, and their use as a shorthand for such nerds in media and film costumes.
