= Kendall Windham =

American professional wrestler (born 1967)

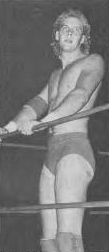
- Windham, c. 1986

Personal information
- Born: Kendall Wayne Windham; December 15, 1967 (age 58) Sweetwater, Texas, U.S.
- Spouse: Phylis Windham
- Children: 1
- Relatives: Blackjack Mulligan (father); Barry Windham (brother); Mike Rotunda (brother-in-law); Bray Wyatt (nephew); Bo Dallas (nephew)

Professional wrestling career
- Ring name: Kendall Windham
- Billed height: 6 ft 5 in (196 cm)
- Billed weight: 260 lb (118 kg)
- Trained by: Hiro Matsuda; Jimmy Tanaka; Pat Tanaka
- Debut: June 11, 1984
- Retired: 2002

Kendall Wayne Windham (born December 15, 1967) is an American retired professional wrestler best known for his appearances with World Championship Wrestling. He is the son of Blackjack Mulligan and the brother of Barry Windham.

== Professional wrestling career ==
=== Championship Wrestling from Florida (1984–1987) ===
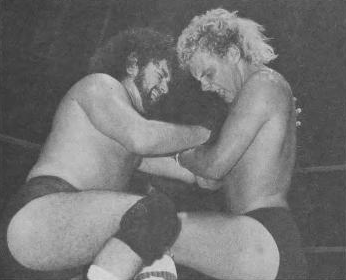
Windham (right) vs. Barry Horowitz, c. 1986

Kendall Windham started wrestling in 1984 for Championship Wrestling from Florida, making his debut on June 10 in Tampa, Florida, aged 16, in a win over Jack Hart (Barry Horowitz). He was very skinny but had the same moves and looks as his older brother, Barry.

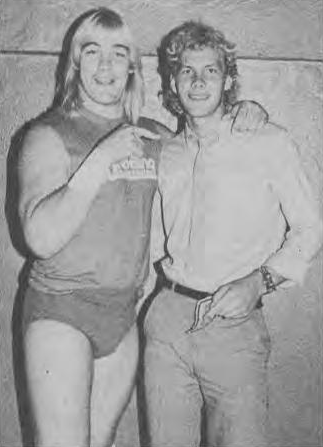
Kendall (right) and his brother Barry Windham, c. 1986

Kendall began his career facing and defeating Hart in various house show matches around the circuit. On June 23, 1985, the rookie competed in a tournament to crown the NWA Florida Heavyweight Champion, wrestling Rip Rogers to a draw. He remained undefeated until he was finally pinned by Jack Hart at a house show in Orlando, Florida. Two months later he gained his first title, defeating Hart to win the Florida Heavyweight Championship on September 2, 1985, at the Battle of the Belts in Tampa. Windham retained the title against Jack Hart in rematches, and cast as good guy (face) he teamed with his brother Barry to feud with Ron Bass and Kevin Sullivan's "cult".

On February 22, 1986, Kendall finally lost the Florida title to The Cuban Assassin (Fidel Sierra) at a TV taping in Tampa. The loss was avenged a few weeks later when Windham regained the title at another TV taping on March 30, 1986, when he defeated The White Ninja (The Great Muta), beginning a feud with the future superstar and partner Kendo Nagasaki.

In May 1986, the Florida title was vacated, but Kendall participated in a tournament to crown the next champion. He defeated the White Ninja and Jerry Grey to regain the title for a third time on May 18, 1986, but lost the title to the Ninja three days later at a TV taping. On June 9 he won the belt for a fourth time by defeating the White Ninja in a cage match in Orlando. Kendall defended the championship successfully against the Ninja and Kendo Nagasaki before losing the title to Ron Bass on July 15, 1986.

Kendall feuded with Ron Bass for the remainder of the summer of 1986 but was unable to regain the championship. On September 1, 1986, he faced Chris Champion for the NWA Florida Bahamian Championship at the Battle of the Belts III event in Daytona Beach, Florida, winning via disqualification. He then resumed his feud with Kendo Nagasaki, defeating him in numerous house show matches in the fall of 1986. On December 12, 1986, he received his first ever shot at the NWA World Championship, wrestling Ric Flair in a loss at a house show in Tampa. Kendall closed out the year teaming with Vic Steamboat in a tournament to crown the vacant NWA Florida Tag Team Championship, losing in the finals to The New Breed on December 25, 1986.

Windham and Steamboat were unsuccessful in rematches with the New Breed in January 1987, but they did defeat The Sheepherders and The Shock Troops (Ed Gantner & Kareem Muhammad) that month. He continued to wrestle for the CWF throughout the spring, and Kendall's final match came against The Tahitian Prince in Jacksonville, Florida, on May 25, 1987.

=== Jim Crockett Promotions / World Championship Wrestling (1987–1989) ===
In 1987, he ventured to the NWA's Jim Crockett Promotions, making his debut on the June 2nd, 1987 taping of Worldwide Wrestling and defeating Thunderfoot #1. Three days later he sustained his first loss, falling to NWA Television Champion Tully Blanchard at a house show in Richmond, Virginia. Unlike his brother, Kendall found himself as an opening match wrestler on the house show circuit and lost to Eddie Gilbert and Arn Anderson. On June 27, 1987, he teamed with Barry for the first time in JCP, facing The Midnight Express in a losing effort at a house show in Fayetteville, North Carolina.

That summer he began teaming with Todd Champion and feuded with The MOD Squad (Spike and Basher). The feud also carried over to a second partnership that he formed, this time with The Italian Stallion. On August 29, 1987, the duo battled The MOD Squad to a time limit draw on NWA Worldwide. Windham also formed another team, this time with Jimmy Valiant and competed frequently on the house show circuit. On the October 24, 1987, edition of Worldwide Wrestling, Kendall Windham challenged Lex Luger unsuccessfully for the NWA United States Championship. On December 1, 1987, he earned a non-title match against NWA World Heavyweight Champion Ric Flair, but was pinned.

Kendall entered 1988 mired in the preliminary ranks, losing to Larry Zbyszko, Arn Anderson, NWA Florida Champion Rick Steiner and The Powers of Pain. On February 14, 1988 he teamed with the Stallion in a losing effort against Shaska Whatley & Tiger Conway Jr. in Greenville, North Carolina, after which the team went on hiatus. Two months later he formed a new tandem, this time with Ricky Santana and defeated The Sheepherders (Bushwhackers) via disqualification on April 8, 1988, at a house show in Houston, Texas. Less than two weeks later they made their televised debut, again defeating The Sheepherders via disqualification on the April 17th edition of The Main Event. A week later Santana and Windham beat The Sheepherders by pinfall on the Main Event.

Meanwhile he restarted his team with the Stallion again to enter the 3rd Annual Jim Crockett Sr. Memorial Cup, defeating The Terminator and The Green Machine in the opening round via forfeit in Greenville, South Carolina. Windham and the Stallion fell in the second round to NWA Tag Team Champions Arn Anderson & Barry Windham later that day.

On the May 1, 1988, edition of The Main Event, The Sheepherders gained a measure of revenge, as they teamed with Rip Morgan to defeat Windham, Santana, and Johnny Ace. On May 8, 1988, he subbed for Larry Zbyszko at a house show in Greenville, South Carolina, to take on partner Ricky Santana in a bout that went to a draw. After this Kendall resumed his team with Stallion, facing The Powers of Pain, The Midnight Express, The Varsity Club, and Larry Zbyszko & Al Perez that summer. On July 10, 1988, he teamed with Tim Horner to fall to Rick Steiner & Dick Murdoch in a pre-PPV match for the 1988 Great American Bash (the match aired live on The Main Event). On August 20 Windham and Stallion finally gained a televised victory, beating Keith Steinborn & Don Valentine on World Championship Wrestling.

Kendall Windham took a hiatus that fall, and when he returned in December it was with a new partner. On the December 10th edition of World Championship Wrestling, he formed The Texas Broncos with another second-generation wrestler, Dustin Rhodes. The two young wrestlers faced The Cruel Connection in their debut match. They began facing The Original Midnight Express on the house show circuit, falling up short in each encounter. Meanwhile on television the Broncos remained undefeated, facing a variety of preliminary competition.

In January 1989 on NWA Worldwide the Broncos suffered their first televised defeat, falling to Al Perez and Larry Zbyszko. This marked the final appearance for the Broncos, as Dustin Rhodes would soon depart for the newly formed Professional Wrestling Federation. In a match aired on January 28, 1989, Kendall teamed with Eddie Gilbert against his brother Barry and J. J. Dillon of the Four Horsemen. Kendall turned on Gilbert and joined Barry and held up the four fingers to the camera. Before the next show, Dillon left for the WWF and the Horsemen name was dropped. Kendall began teaming with Barry but his association with the Horsemen was short-lived. James J. Dillon would leave the promotion shortly thereafter. The Windhams and Flair were given a new manager, Hiro Matsuda, and a new stable name, "Yamasaki Corporation".

On the March 18, 1989, edition of World Championship Wrestling, Kendall teamed with Barry to defeat United States Champion Lex Luger and Michael Hayes; during the match, Hayes turned on his partner to join the Yamasaki Corporation. The stable would grow to include Butch Reed as well, although the group would not remain together for long. Barry Windham would leave the promotion in March 1988, and following a loss to Lex Luger at a house show in Memphis, Tennessee, on April 20 he too would depart the NWA for Florida.

=== Return to Championship Wrestling from Florida (1989–1990) ===
On June 27, 1989, Windham won the FCW Heavyweight Championship from Dustin Rhodes. He obtained a new manager, Oliver Humperdink, and feuded with Rhodes. He soon left Humperdink for Robert Fuller's Stud Stable and by the end of 1989, was a member of Ron Slinker's "Strike Command". In 1990, he left Slinker and teamed with Fuller to win the Tag Team Titles, Upon losing them, they split and feuded.

=== World Championship Wrestling (1989–1990) ===
Eight months after departing WCW for the PWF, Windham made his return to the Turner promotion. Appearing on the Dec 9, 1989, episode of World Championship Wrestling, he defeated Bob Ryder. The following week he defeated Trent Knight and discussed his return to WCW. He next appeared on the Jan 6, 1990, edition of WCW Pro and was defeated by Brian Pillman. His final appearance came in a match against Tommy Rich on Jan 16, 1990, at an event in Camp Lejeune. Windham decided to take a two year hiatus from wrestling, which happened to coincide with his 24 month federal prison sentence.

=== Various promotions (1992–1993) ===
Windham returned to wrestling in 1992 for Florida's ICWA promotion where he feuded with Pat Tanaka and Kevin Sullivan. He had put on some more weight in prison and was considered a heavyweight instead of a light heavyweight.

Later that year Kendall teamed with Dan Spivey for a tour of All Japan Pro Wrestling. He made his debut for the promotion on Nov 14, 1992, in Omiya, Japan in a losing effort to the Miracle Violence Connection. Spivey and Windham competed in the AJPW Real World Tag League 1992 event, and on November 17th defeated Dory Funk Jr. and Tsuyoshi Kikuchi. On December 1, 1992, he teamed with Johnny Ace in a losing effort against Joel Deaton and Andre the Giant in Ishikawa, Japan. The tour ended with Spivey and Windham facing Billy Black and Joel Deaton on Dec 4th in Tokyo.

Windham returned to All Japan the following year to participate in the AJPW Summer Action Series 1993. He wrestled in multiple singles matches on the tour, facing Jun Akiyama, Pete Roberts, and Takao Omori. On July 7, 1993, Windham teamed with Big Bubba (Big Boss Man) to defeat Akira Taue & Takao Omori in Hyogo, Japan. Later that fall he participated in the AJPW Giant Series 1993, again teaming with Big Bossman as well as Stan Hansen and Ted Dibiase.

=== World Championship Wrestling (1993) ===
Kendall returned to WCW on July 10, 1993, teaming with Mark Starr to face The Hollywood Blonds on WCW Worldwide. On the December 25th episode of Worldwide he teamed with an unknown wrestler to face Pretty Wonderful in an unsuccessful effort. At the same taping in Orlando, Florida, he was defeated by Paul Roma.

=== Extreme Championship Wrestling (1995) ===
Windham surfaced on January 14, 1995, in ECW, defeating Hack Myers at a house show in Davie, Florida. Two days later he defeated Prey of the Dead (Horace Hogan) at a show in Ft. Lauderdale.

=== World Championship Wrestling (1997–1999) ===
Windham returned to WCW on September 15, 1997. His head now shaved, he lost to Chris Adams in a dark match for Monday Nitro in Charlotte, North Carolina. A month later he made his next appearance, defeating Chavo Guerrero Jr. on WCW Pro. Four days later he would beat old rival Bobby Eaton on WCW Saturday Night. Kendall would initially feud with Chris Adams and Jim Duggan. He made his first official PPV appearance at WCW World War 3 on November 23, 1997, competing in the 60 person battle royal.

On January 22, 1998, he became one of the earlier participants in the Goldberg Win Streak, losing to Bill Goldberg on WCW Thunder. Windham continued to feud with Duggan while remaining victorious over lower-level opponents, including El Dandy, Tim Cheeks, and Evan Karagias. As the year progressed however, he began to register more defeats, falling to Perry Saturn, Jim Neidhart, Fit Finlay, Dean Malenko, and Dale Torborg. On November 17, 1998, he unsuccessfully challenged Chris Jericho for the WCW World Television title on WCW Saturday Night.

In 1999, when WCW created a hardcore division, he entered it briefly and feuded with Hardcore Hak. In June, Windham joined The West Texas Rednecks in what would be the biggest push of his career. The Rednecks were his brother Barry, Curt Hennig and Bobby Duncum Jr. They were supposed to be heels feuding with Master P's rappers, the "No Limit Soldiers", but the southern fans of WCW cheered the Rednecks instead. The angle was quickly dropped and they moved on to a feud with "Harlem Heat" (Booker T and Stevie Ray). Kendall gained his first WCW championship when he and Barry defeated Harlem Heat for the WCW World Tag Team Titles on August 23, 1999, at a Monday Nitro in Las Vegas.

The new champions successfully defended their titles against Kenny Kaos and Prince Iaukea on a Nitro airing from Unionsdale, New York, on August 30. A day later, The Windham Brothers defeated The Texas Outlaws on WCW Saturday Night. On September 10, the Windhams defeated Billy Kidman and Konnan at a house show in Baltimore. At the WCW Fall Brawl 99 PPV on September 12, 1999, Kendall and Barry defended against Harlem Heat in a rematch but were defeated for the titles. The Windhams would attempt to regain their titles against Harlem Heat at a Nitro on September 27 but were unsuccessful.

As fall progressed Kendall began teaming with fellow West Texas Redneck stablemate Curly Bill (Virgil), facing Harlem Heat at numerous house shows. While falling short against the Heat, the new team defeated El Dandy and La Parka on WCW Worldwide on October 10, followed by Disorderly Conduct. Kendall's final WCW match came in a tag with Curly Bill against The Armstrongs (Scott Armstrong and Steve Armstrong) on WCW Worldwide on November 9, 1999.

=== Late career (1999–2002) ===
By the end of 1999, all of the West Memphis Rednecks had left WCW. Kendall next appeared in the WWC, defeating Dutch Mantell in his debut on December 18, 1999, in Guaynabo, Puerto Rico. He then challenged Ray González for the WWC Universal Championship on May 6, 2000, in a match that went to a double countout. That summer Barry joined the promotion, and on July 16, 2000, the Windham Brothers defeated The Public Enemy at the WWC 27th Aniversario show. On September 2, 2000, the Windhams defeated La Artilleria Pesada (Lightning & Thunder) to win the WWC Tag-Team Championship.

At the same time Kendall also wrestled im NWA Florida in the fall of 2000, defeating The Stone Mountain in a tournament to crown the NWA World Heavyweight Championship. He later teamed with Fidel Sierra to wrestle The New Heavenly Bodies (Chris Nelson & Vito DeNucci) at the NWA Florida OktoberSLAM! card on October 17, 2000.

In November 2000 the Windhams traveled to All Japan Pro Wrestling to participate in the AJPW Real World Tag League 2000 event. They started out the series in victorious fashion, defeating Genichiro Tenryu & Nobutaka Araya in Tokyo, Japan on November 19. The Windham Brothers were largely victorious during the tour, defeating Mike Rotundo & Steve Williams, Dan Kroffat & Yoshiaki Fujiwara, and Masahito Kakihara & Shigeo Okumura. They closed out the event by defeating Nobutaka Araya & Shigeo Okumura in Tokyo, Japan.

The Windhams then returned to WWC to defend their tag-team championship in December 2000. However, in their first defense on December 16, 2000, they were defeated by La Artilleria Pesada in Carolina, Puerto Rico. Kendall and Barry had a rematch on January 7, 2001, in Mayaguez, Puerto Rico, but were defeated. This marked the final match in Kendall's career.

Windham retired in 2002.

== Personal life ==
Mike Rotunda is married to Windham's sister. His nephews, Windham and Taylor, wrestled for WWE as Bray Wyatt and Bo Dallas respectively. He has a son named Wyatt. He is currently president of a security business in Brandon, Florida.

In 1990, Windham and his father Blackjack Mulligan were arrested by the United States Secret Service in a joint investigation with the Florida Department of Law Enforcement (FDLE) for counterfeiting. The authorities found close to $500,000 in phony $20 bills. As a result of a plea agreement, both father and son spent 24 months in a federal prison and were released in 1992.

== Championships and accomplishments ==
- Championship Wrestling from Florida
  - NWA Florida Heavyweight Championship (5 times)
  - NWA Florida Tag Team Championship (1 time) – with Robert Fuller
- Professional Wrestling Federation
  - PWF Caribbean Championship (1 time)
- Pro Wrestling Illustrated
  - PWI ranked him #213 of the top 500 singles wrestlers in the PWI 500 in 1992
  - PWI ranked him #444 of the top 500 singles wrestlers of the "PWI Years" in 2003
- World Championship Wrestling
  - WCW World Tag Team Championship (1 time) – with Barry Windham
- World Wrestling Council
  - WWC World Tag Team Championship (1 time) – with Barry Windham
