= Orlando Sports Stadium =

Arena in Florida, United States

Coordinates: 28°34′30.6″N 81°15′15.8″W

Orlando Sports Stadium (a.k.a. Eddie Graham Sports Complex) was an indoor arena, located in Orlando, Florida at 2285 N Econlockhatchee Trail. The venue was opened in 1967 by GC "Pete" Ashlock and was sold in 1981 to Edward Gossett (Eddie Graham) and renamed after professional wrestler and promoter Eddie Graham. After his death the venue transferred to Mike Graham and later, Tony Andrews. It closed in 1993 and was demolished in 1995.

During its existence, it hosted numerous concerts, professional wrestling, and boxing contests.

The arena played host to rock band Led Zeppelin on August 31, 1971, and the Rolling Thunder Revue concert tour on April 23, 1976, headed by Bob Dylan, as well as Elvis Presley who played there on February 15, 1977, six months before his death. The Beach Boys, The Allman Brothers Band, Bob Segar, Johnny Winter, Edgar Winter, Rod Stewart & Faces, Yes, Jethro Tull, Jeff Beck Group, The Moody Blues, Deep Purple, and many more groups played concerts there. Former world champion kickboxer Don "The Dragon" Wilson from Cocoa Beach fought there. George Wallace campaigned for president there. The thrash metal band Slayer also performed there Fri.February 22nd 1991 with opening band Testament

The building was a basic indoor arena, no air conditioning, concrete floor, wood plank benches, and plywood doors on the stalls in the bathroom. It was closed by the Orange County Building Department because of code violations and was demolished in November 1995. The land on which it stood is now occupied by a housing development called Econ River Estates.
