= Ed Gantner =

American professional wrestler (1959–1990)

Personal information
- Born: February 4, 1959 Orlando, Florida, U.S.
- Died: December 31, 1990 (aged 31) Orlando, Florida, U.S.

Professional wrestling career
- Ring name: Ed "The Bull" Gantner
- Billed height: 6 ft 4 in (1.93 m)
- Billed weight: 280 lb (130 kg)
- Debut: 1985
- Retired: July 24, 1987

Edward James Gantner Jr. (February 4, 1959 – December 31, 1990) was an American professional wrestler and football player who was nicknamed "the Bull".

== Early life ==
Edward James Ganter Jr. was born in Orlando, Florida, the youngest of four children. Ed was the only son with three older sisters. By the time he was three years old, his father would throw him a football hard enough to knock him down, only to get back up and throw it back. His mother and sisters never recall Gantner having a knack for football. He was considered a "puny little runt," all the way through junior high school.

Gantner's life began to change around age twelve when his parents separated. His father moved out of the house, while his mother went back to school. His mother and sisters worked to keep the family afloat, and during this period he found solace in weight lifting, pumping iron for hours alone in his room, also finding solace in surfing.

== Professional football career ==
Gantner's major football career started at Edgewater High School. Around his junior year, he began using steroids. Between his junior and senior years in high school, he gained 45 lbs. His newly found physique gained him confidence to the point, where he talked incessantly about the weight he gained, how much he could lift, and the size of his biceps and neck.

After graduating from high school, he received a college scholarship to play football for the University of Tennessee, but after less than a year, he became depressed and homesick.

After returning home to Orlando, he took a hiatus, working as a bartender and a bouncer at Rose O’Grady‘s big time Emporium, owned by Bob Snow at that time. It was the number three tourist attraction in the state of Florida. In 1979 through 1982, he returned to playing college football, this time for the UCF, as a defensive tackle alongside Thomas Michael O’Shaughnessy Jr. and defensive back Mark Whigham. Tom Murphy was part of that original UCF coaching staff of Sam Woodshed local fame. He also had the honor of being the 2nd man from the college to go professional (Tim Kiggins, a defensive back playing for the Toronto Argonauts was the first from the first two years of UCF Football. He played pro football in the United States Football League, where he played for the Tampa Bay Bandits for one year, and for the Jacksonville Bulls for two years.

== Professional wrestling career ==
Gantner made his debut for Championship Wrestling from Florida in 1985 as a heel, joining the House of Humperdink, led by Sir Oliver Humperdink. Within the group, he formed a tag team with Kareem Muhammed called the Shock Troops. They made their debut on TV jumping The Fabulous Ones, starting a program with them. They also unsuccessfully challenged The Road Warriors at Battle Of The Belts 3 on September 1, 1986. He would also have a feud with Lex Luger that would go on for a good part of 1986.

In February 1987, Gantner was awarded the NWA Florida Heavyweight Championship, after his manager Sir Oliver Humperdink defeated Bad News Allen for the title. After losing the title to Mike Rotunda a month later, Gantner turned on Humperdink, turning him face. Gantner feuded with Humperdink's group with Barry Windham, Blackjack Mulligan, Bugsy McGraw and even Dusty Rhodes as his partner at different times. By July 1987, even with him in most of the major angles for Championship Wrestling from Florida, he abruptly retired from pro wrestling due to health issues.

== Retirement and death ==
In 1988, Gantner's health began to decline after years of steroid use. His kidneys were the first to start failing, causing him to undergo kidney dialysis, and he had to be hooked up several hours a week to a machine to survive.

Doctors also recommended Gantner to lose 100 lbs, as he nearly weighed 300 lbs. He complied by giving up red meat and starting a holistic diet, making his own watermelon tea. Despite the changes, he could not stop using steroids, and had started using cocaine. He was rushed to the hospital for heart failure four times within two months. At that point, he started asking around for a firearm.

By the fall of 1989, his heart and kidneys were failing, after refusing doctors' orders to lose weight and alter his exercise regimen. On Thanksgiving Day, November 23, 1989, Gantner received a kidney transplant, as his sister donated her kidney. Five days later, he demanded lifting weights be brought into his room, as he went back to using steroids.

The strain of recovering from the transplant caused Gantner to lose weight, but he had still an imposing figure. Despite this, when he looked into a mirror, he saw a defective, distorted image. Self-conscious about his physique, he would wear shorts under his jeans to look bigger. While in the gym, he would wear an extra pair of socks to bulk up his calves. Over the next six months, he would go back to the hospital five times, because of complications. He would also move from Orlando, to St. Augustine, to West Palm Beach, working as a salesman.

Early in the fall of 1990, Gantner's mental health began to falter even further, as he started calling his parents late at night. He would get dressed for work, make it to his car, and sit there for a half-hour with the keys in the ignition, before going back in his house. When his mother finally decided to bring him home in Orlando, she found him in a dark room, sitting down, rocking on his bed.

Back home with his parents in Orlando, Gantner would not eat, sleep, or work out. He would shower constantly and pace all night long. When his mother tried to take him for a haircut, he made her drive all over town, and at each stop, he refused to leave the car.

By November 1990, Gantner was admitted to a psychiatric ward at a Florida hospital, where he stayed until after Christmas. During this time, he began casting about for solutions and new truths—meditation, vitamins, even faith healing with Rev. Benny Hinn.

On December 31, 1990, Gantner was discovered lying motionless in the kitchen of his parents' home in Orlando, Florida. He was pronounced dead upon arrival when taken to the hospital, and his death was ruled a suicide by a self-inflicted gunshot wound to the heart. He was 31 years old.

== Championships and accomplishments ==
- Championship Wrestling From Florida
  - NWA Florida Heavyweight Championship (1 time)

== See also ==
- List of premature professional wrestling deaths
- List of gridiron football players who became professional wrestlers
