= NWA Florida Bahamian Championship =

Professional wrestling championship

- The championship belt

Details
- Promotion: Championship Wrestling from Florida
- Date established: 1982
Statistics
- First champion(s): Sweet Sugar Brown
- Most reigns: Tyree Pride (3 times)

The NWA Florida Bahamas Championship was a title that existed in Championship Wrestling from Florida from 1982 until 1987. It was also known as the NWA Bahama Island Championship.

== Title history ==
Key
No.	Overall reign number
Reign	Reign number for the specific champion
Days	Number of days held

No.	Champion	Championship change			Reign statistics		Notes	Ref.
No.	Champion	Date	Event	Location	Reign	Days	Notes	Ref.
1	Sweet Brown Sugar	August 1982	CWF show	Florida	1	(Note: The length of the reign is too uncertain to calculate.)	First promoted as champion in August 1982.	
2	Jimmy Garvin	October 27, 1982	CWF show	Miami, Florida	1	41	Defeated Terry Allen for the championship after Sweet Brown Sugar did not show up for the match.	
3	Rufus R. Jones	December 7, 1982	CWF show	Tampa, Florida	1			
4	Angelo Mosca	April 1983	CWF show	Florida	1			
5	Dusty Rhodes	July 1983	CWF show	Nassau, Bahamas	1			
—	Vacated	July 1984	—	—	—	—	Championship vacated when Dusty Rhodes left to wrestle for Jim Crockett Promotions full-time.	
6	Buddy Rose	October 12, 1985	CWF show	Nassau, Bahamas	1	6	Defeated Pez Whatley to win the vacant championship	
7	Tyree Pride	October 18, 1985	CWF show	Nassau, Bahamas	1			
8	Jerry Grey	March 1986	CWF show	Tampa, Florida	1			
9	Tyree Pride	March 15, 1986	CWF show	Nassau, Bahamas	2	77		
10	Ron Bass	May 31, 1986	CWF show	Nassau, Bahamas	1	35		
11	Tyree Pride	July 5, 1986	CWF show	Nassau, Bahamas	3	29	Won title from Bass in tag team match with Lex Luger against Bass and Ed Gantner	
12	Chris Champion	August 3, 1986	CWF show	Orlando, Florida	1	56		
13	The Falcon	September 28, 1986	CWF show	Orlando, Florida	1	70		
14	Bad News Allen	December 7, 1986	CWF show	Orlando, Florida	1	55		
—	Deactivated	January 31, 1987	CWF show	Ft. Lauderdale, Florida	—	—	Championship was unified with the NWA Florida Southern Heavyweight Championship.	

== See also ==
- Ring Warriors
- National Wrestling Alliance
