= Jimmy Jack Funk =

American professional wrestler

- Barr, c. 1985

Personal information
- Born: Ferrin Barr Jr. April 14, 1959 (age 67) Portland, Oregon, U.S.
- Family: Sandy Barr (father); Art Barr (brother)

Professional wrestling career
- Ring name(s): The Assassin; Jesse Barr; Jimmy Jack Funk; JJ Funk
- Billed height: 6 ft 0 in (1.83 m)
- Billed weight: 242 lb (110 kg)
- Billed from: Double Cross Ranch, Amarillo, Texas (as Jimmy Jack Funk)
- Trained by: Sandy Barr
- Debut: March 1980
- Retired: September 2016

Ferrin Barr Jr. (born April 14, 1959) is an American retired professional wrestler. He is best known for his appearances with Championship Wrestling from Florida under the ring name Jesse Barr and with the World Wrestling Federation under the ring name Jimmy Jack Funk. He is the son of wrestling promoter Sandy Barr and the elder brother to wrestler Art Barr.

== Professional wrestling career ==
=== Early career (1980–1986) ===
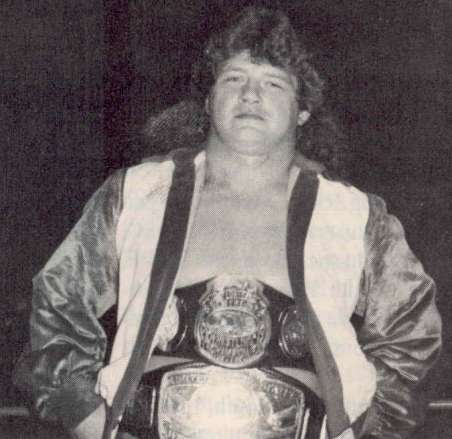
Barr wearing two title belts while wrestling in Championship Wrestling from Florida

Barr made his debut in March 1980 for Portland Wrestling. He later worked for Mid-South Wrestling. Barr was one of the top villains in Florida in the mid-1980s, winning the NWA Florida Heavyweight Championship from Scott McGhee in October 1984. He lost the belt to Brian Blair before regaining it and eventually losing it for good to Hector Guerrero in late April 1985. Barr teamed with Rick Rude to hold the United States Tag Team Championship for three months before turning. He went to the World Wrestling Council in Puerto Rico having feuds with Super Medico 1 and Carlos Colon in figure 4 vs figure 4 leg lock match and later came back to Florida as a fan favorite, and in early 1986 he feuded over the Southern Heavyweight Championship with a young Lex Luger.

=== World Wrestling Federation (1986–1987) ===
After leaving Florida, Barr arrived in the WWF in April 1986 in a Lone Ranger-style mask as Jimmy Jack Funk, the storyline younger and unstable brother of Terry and Dory "Hoss" Funk, with whom he had previously worked in Florida. In addition to his mask, he also wore a noose around his neck to the ring. According to his storyline, he was a former amateur wrestler who lost his mind after he missed out on the chance to compete in the 1980 Summer Olympics due to the United States' boycott. With Jimmy Hart as his manager, Barr debuted to a decent push, but Terry Funk's exit from the WWF in early June caused Hoss and Jimmy Jack to fall down the card as a tag team under Hart. Their most notable match together (and Dory's last in the WWF for almost a decade) was a loss to The Killer Bees in the opening match of The Big Event, a supercard at the Canadian National Exhibition Stadium in Toronto on August 28.

As the only remaining "Funk" in the WWF (and without Hart in his corner), Barr quickly became an aimless enhancement talent, losing regularly to the likes of Tito Santana, Koko B. Ware, Hillbilly Jim and Blackjack Mulligan and teaming with a series of journeymen with whom he had no previous storyline connection. He remained in the WWF in this capacity until June 1987, but was released following a backstage incident with Haku. Despite rumors that one of his eyes had been gouged out during the fight, Haku himself definitively stated that the rumors were untrue and that he deliberately avoided injuring Barr.

=== Later career (1987–1997, 2010, 2016) ===
After the WWF, Barr wrestled in Continental Wrestling Association, feuding with Jerry Lawler. During one interview, Barr referred to Terry Funk as his "cousin" (not brother, see above), a claim that he would repeat backstage during a lightly attended show outside of Portland, Oregon in late 1991. Then Barr joined World Class Championship Wrestling, where he was a villain at first but turned into a fan favorite in 1989 after parting ways with manager Skandor Akbar after he took offense to the derogatory things Akbar had said about Texas. Barr and Chris Adams were involved in a tag-team feud with King Parsons and Brickhouse Brown for several months with no clear resolution. After World Class, Barr returned to Portland, where he finished his career. While there, he won the NWA Pacific Northwest Tag Team Championship while teaming with Steve Doll on June 12, 1991. The title reign lasted eight days, as the team dropped the championship to The Harris Brothers on June 20.

Barr retired in 1997, aside from a one-night return for NWA Carolinas in 2010. His last match was in September 2016 in North Carolina. Barr now works in the construction business in Portland, Oregon.

== Personal life ==
In July 2016, Barr was named part of a class action lawsuit filed against WWE which alleged that wrestlers incurred traumatic brain injuries during their tenure and that the company concealed the risks of injury. The suit was litigated by attorney Konstantine Kyros, who has been involved in a number of other lawsuits against WWE. US District Judge Vanessa Lynne Bryant dismissed the lawsuit in September 2018.

== Championships and accomplishments ==
- Championship Wrestling from Florida
  - NWA Florida Heavyweight Championship (2 times)
  - NWA Southern Heavyweight Championship (Florida version) (1 time)
  - NWA United States Tag Team Championship (Florida version) (1 time) – with Rick Rude
- Championship Wrestling USA
  - CWUSA International Tag Team Championship (2 times) – with Ryuma Go
- Continental Wrestling Association
  - NWA Mid-America Heavyweight Championship (1 time)
- Pacific Northwest Wrestling
  - NWA Pacific Northwest Tag Team Championship (1 time) – with Steve Doll
- Ring Around The Northwest Newsletter
  - Tag Team of the Year (1993) with Ryuma Go
  - Wrestler of the Year (1993)
- World Class Wrestling Association
  - WCWA Texas Tag Team Championship (1 time) – with John Tatum
