= NWA Florida Heavyweight Championship =

Professional wrestling championship

- An old version of the championship belt

Details
- Promotion: Championship Wrestling from Florida NWA Florida Underground Wrestling NWA Florida Wrestling Alliance
- Date established: January 5, 1937
- Date retired: September 30, 2017
Statistics
- First champion: John Grandovitch
- Final champion: Mason Price
- Most reigns: Dusty Rhodes (12 reigns)
- Longest reign: Alan Eustace (2,784 days)
- Shortest reign: Jos LeDuc (1 day)

The NWA Florida Heavyweight Championship was a major title in Championship Wrestling from Florida and is now the major title in NWA Florida Wrestling Alliance. It started in 1937 and was abandoned in 1949. It was picked back up in 1966 by CWF and lasted until 1987 when the company was purchased by Jim Crockett Promotions. In 1988, the newly created Florida Championship Wrestling (FCW), soon renamed Pro Wrestling Federation (PWF), picked it back up in 1988 and it continued its lineage through NWA Florida, until they ceased operations in 2006. In 2009, Pro Wrestling Fusion revived the title until they left the NWA in 2011. For several months in 2012, a new Championship Wrestling from Florida affiliated with the NWA, briefly reviving the title until NWA Florida Underground Wrestling took over the championship.

== Title history ==
Key
| No. | Overall reign number |
| Reign | Reign number for the specific champion |
| Days | Number of days held |

| No. | Champion | Championship change | | | Reign statistics | | Notes | Ref. |
| No. | Champion | Date | Event | Location | Reign | Days | Notes | Ref. |
|---|---|---|---|---|---|---|---|---|
| 1 | John Grandovitch | September 7, 1934 | CWF Show | Tampa, Florida | 1 | 348 | | |
| 2 | Bruce Nolan | August 21, 1935 | CWF Show | Miami, Florida | 1 | 56 | | |
| 3 | Bill Sledge | October 16, 1935 | CWF Show | Miami, Florida | 1 | 154 | Still champion as of November 12, 1935, | |
| — | Vacated | March 18, 1936 | — | — | — | — | | |
| 4 | Pat Newman | March 19, 1936 | CWF Show | Jacksonville, Florida | 1 | 126 | Defeats title claimant Doug Wyckoff. | |
| 5 | Doug Wycoff | July 23, 1936 | CWF Show | N/A | 1 | 166 | | |
| 6 | Dobie Osbourne | January 5, 1937 | CWF Show | Florida | 1 | 2 | | |
| 7 | Hans Schumann | January 7, 1937 | CWF Show | St. Petersburg, Florida | 1 | 12 | Defeats John Plummer for the title. | |
| 8 | Red Devil | January 19, 1937 | CWF Show | Jacksonville, Florida | 1 | 117 | | |
| — | Vacated | May 16, 1937 | — | — | — | — | | |
| 6 | Pat Newman | May 25, 1937 | CWF Show | N/A | 2 | 7 | | |
| 7 | Alan Eustace | June 1, 1937 | CWF Show | St. Petersburg, Florida | 1 | 15 | | |
| 8 | Bill Sledge | June 16, 1937 | CWF Show | N/A | 2 | N/A | | |
| 9 | Jack Evans | August 1937 | CWF Show | N/A | 1 | N/A | Sometime after July 27, 1937. | |
| 10 | Alan Eustace | August 13, 1937 | CWF Show | Jacksonville, Florida | 2 | 161 | Defeated Jack Evans | |
| 11 | Gene Bowman | January 21, 1938 | CWF Show | Jacksonville, Florida | 1 | N/A | | |
| 12 | Pat McCleary | March 1938 | CWF Show | Tampa, Florida | 1 | N/A | Sometime between March 12, 1938 and March 17, 1938. | |
| 13 | Gene Bowman | April 22, 1938 | CWF Show | Jacksonville, Florida | 2 | N/A | | |
| — | | May 1938 | — | — | | | Due to injury. | |
| 14 | Ernie Powers | May 1938 | CWF Show | Tampa, Florida | 1 | N/A | | |
| 15 | Bill Sledge | May 13, 1938 (NLT) | CWF Show | Tampa, Florida | 3 | N/A | Last week in Tampa. | |
| 16 | Jack Vincent | July 11, 1938 | CWF Show | Tampa, Florida | 1 | N/A | | |
| 17 | unrecorded | N/A | N/A | N/A | | | | |
| 18 | Ray Villmer | May 26, 1939 (NLT) | CWF Show | N/A | 1 | N/A | Still champion as of July 19, 1939. | |
| 19 | unrecorded | N/A | N/A | N/A | | | | |
| 20 | John Grandovitch | August 8, 1939 (NLT) | CWF Show | Tampa, Florida | 2 | N/A | Defeats Tommy O'Toole. | |
| 21 | Floyd Marshall | October 17, 1939 | CWF Show | St. Petersburg, Florida | 1 | N/A | | |
| 22 | John Grandovitch | November 1939 (NLT) | CWF Show | N/A | 3 | N/A | | |
| 23 | Red Ryan | November 11, 1939 | CWF Show | St. Petersburg, Florida | 1 | 24 | | |
| 24 | Tom Mahoney | December 5, 1939 | CWF Show | St. Petersburg, Florida | 1 | 49 | | |
| 25 | Clarence Luttrall | January 23, 1940 | CWF Show | St. Petersburg, Florida | 1 | 48 | The feud between Luttrall and Mahoney continue, and both continue claiming the title; a tournament to settle the dispute is ordered. | |
| 26 | Jim Wright | March 11, 1940 | CWF Show | St. Petersburg, Florida | 1 | 15 | Defeats Tom Mahoney in tournament final. | |
| 27 | Dick Shikat | March 26, 1940 | CWF Show | St. Petersburg, Florida | 1 | N/A | | |
| 28 | unrecorded | | CWF Show | N/A | | N/A | | |
| 29 | Cy Williams | May 11, 1940 (NLT) | CWF Show | N/A | 1 | N/A | Claims Southern and Florida titles; Henry Piers start claiming both titles when Williams is injured during a match in Tampa, Florida on June 10, 1940 Don Evans defeats Piers on June 17, 1940 in Tampa, Florida to claim both titles. | |
| 30 | Tommy Nilan | June 18, 1940 | CWF Show | St. Petersburg, Florida | 1 | N/A | Defeats Williams to claim the Southern and Florida titles. | |
| 31 | Don Evans | 1940 | CWF Show | N/A | 1 | N/A | | |
| 32 | Tommy Nilan | July 23, 1940 | CWF Show | St. Petersburg, Florida. | 2 | N/A | Defeats Don Evans. | |
| 33 | unrecorded | | CWF Show | N/A | | N/A | | |
| 34 | Cy Williams | August 21, 1940 (NLT) | CWF Show | N/A | 2 | N/A | | |
| 35 | unrecorded | N/A | N/A | N/A | | | | |
| 36 | Herb Teitenberg | February 11, 1944 | CWF Show | St. Petersburg, Florida | 1 | 15 | | |
| 37 | Rollend Kirchmeyer | February 26, 1944 | CWF Show | Tampa, Florida | 1 | 0 | Title awarded. | |
| 38 | Ed Lewis | February 26, 1944 | CWF Show | Tampa, Florida | 1 | 0 | Lewis declared the new champion when Kirchmeyer's head hits the floor knocking him unconscious. | |
| 39 | Rollend Kirchmeyer | February 26, 1944 | CWF Show | Tampa, Florida | 2 | 912 | Title returned when Lewis refuses it due to Kirchmeyer being knocked out during match. | |
| 40 | The Cardiff Giant | August 26, 1946 | CWF Show | Tampa, Florida | 1 | 63 | | |
| 41 | Antonio Cortez | October 28, 1946 | CWF Show | Tampa, Florida | 1 | N/A | | |
| 42 | unrecorded | | CWF Show | N/A | | N/A | | |
| 43 | Rollend Kirchmeyer | March 1949 (NLT) | CWF Show | N/A | 3 | N/A | records unclear as to whom he defeated | |
| 44 | unrecorded | | CWF Show | N/A | | N/A | | |
| 45 | Billy McDaniels | January 1953 (NLT) | CWF Show | N/A | 1 | N/A | Defeats Pat Malone. | |
| 46 | unrecorded | N/A | N/A | N/A | | | | |
| 47 | Lester Welch | August 11, 1966 | CWF Show | Tampa, Florida | 1 | 221 | Defeated Sputnik Monroe in tournament final | |
| 48 | Louie Tillet | March 20, 1967 | CWF Show | West Palm Beach, Florida | 1 | 42 | | |
| 49 | Wahoo McDaniel | May 1, 1967 | CWF Show | Orlando, Florida | 1 | 15 | | |
| 50 | Boris Malenko | May 16, 1967 | CWF Show | Tampa, Florida | 1 | 102 | | |
| 51 | Johnny Valentine | August 26, 1967 | CWF Show | Tampa, Florida | 1 | 101 | | |
| 52 | Joe Scarpa | December 5, 1967 | CWF Show | Tampa, Florida | 1 | 22 | | |
| 53 | Johnny Valentine | December 27, 1967 | CWF Show | Tampa, Florida | 2 | N/A | | |
| 54 | Wahoo McDaniel | February 1, 1968 (NLT) | CWF Show | N/A | 2 | N/A | | |
| 55 | Johnny Valentine | February 13, 1968 | CWF Show | Tampa, Florida | 3 | 77 | | |
| 56 | Red Bastien | April 30, 1968 | CWF Show | Tampa, Florida | 1 | 58 | | |
| 57 | Johnny Valentine | June 27, 1968 | CWF Show | Jacksonville, Florida | 4 | 88 | | |
| 58 | Nick Kozak | September 23, 1968 | CWF Show | Orlando, Florida | 1 | 29 | | |
| 59 | Boris Malenko | October 22, 1968 | CWF Show | Tampa, Florida | 2 | 7 | Subbing for Johnny Valentine, defeats Kozak and claims the title. | |
| 60 | Nick Kozak | October 29, 1968 | CWF Show | Tampa, Florida | 2 | 25 | Defeats Malenko to end the dispute. | |
| 61 | The Gladiator | November 23, 1968 | CWF Show | Tampa, Florida | 1 | 66 | | |
| 62 | Hans Mortier | January 28, 1969 | CWF Show | Tampa, Florida | 1 | 77 | | |
| 63 | Ciclón Negro | April 15, 1969 | CWF Show | Tampa, Florida | 1 | 133 | | |
| 64 | Dale Lewis | August 26, 1969 | CWF Show | Tampa, Florida | 1 | 118 | | |
| 65 | Mr. Saito | December 22, 1969 | CWF Show | Tampa, Florida | 1 | 50 | | |
| 66 | Jack Brisco | February 10, 1970 | CWF Show | Tampa, Florida | 1 | 56 | | |
| 67 | Mr. Saito | April 7, 1970 | CWF Show | Tampa, Florida | 2 | 7 | | |
| 68 | Jack Brisco | April 14, 1970 | CWF Show | Tampa, Florida | 2 | 28 | | |
| 69 | The Missouri Mauler | May 12, 1970 | CWF Show | Tampa, Florida | 1 | 7 | | |
| 70 | Jack Brisco | May 19, 1970 | CWF Show | Tampa, Florida | 3 | 210 | | |
| 71 | Tarzan Tyler | December 15, 1970 | CWF Show | Tampa, Florida | 1 | 33 | | |
| 72 | Jack Brisco | January 17, 1971 | CWF Show | Tampa, Florida | 4 | 485 | Best-of-3 falls match, for Tyler's Florida title, with Brisco's TV title on the line for the first fall only; Brisco comes back to win the second and third falls to take the Florida title. | |
| 73 | Paul Jones | May 16, 1972 | CWF Show | Tampa, Florida | 1 | 196 | | |
| 74 | Jack Brisco | November 28, 1972 | CWF Show | Tampa, Florida | 5 | 56 | | |
| — | Vacated | January 23, 1973 | — | — | — | — | After the match between Jack Brisco and Bobby Shane. | |
| 75 | Jack Brisco | January 30, 1973 | CWF Show | Tampa, Florida | 6 | 21 | Defeat Bobby Shane in rematch. | |
| 76 | Buddy Colt | February 20, 1973 | CWF Show | Tampa, Florida | 1 | 112 | | |
| 77 | Paul Jones | June 12, 1973 | CWF Show | Tampa, Florida | 2 | 34 | | |
| 78 | Buddy Colt | July 16, 1973 | CWF Show | Tampa, Florida | 2 | 4 | | |
| 79 | Paul Jones | July 20, 1973 | CWF Show | N/A | 3 | 11 | | |
| 80 | Tim Woods | July 31, 1973 | CWF Show | Tampa, Florida | 1 | 35 | | |
| 81 | Great Mephisto | September 4, 1973 | CWF Show | Tampa, Florida | 1 | 14 | | |
| 82 | Paul Jones | September 18, 1973 | CWF Show | Tampa, Florida | 4 | 60 | | |
| 83 | Buddy Colt | November 17, 1973 | CWF Show | St. Petersburg, Florida | 3 | 10 | | |
| 84 | Eddie Graham | November 27, 1973 | CWF Show | Tampa, Florida | 1 | 20 | | |
| 85 | Buddy Colt | December 17, 1973 | CWF Show | West Palm Beach, Florida | 4 | 93 | | |
| 86 | Ron Fuller | March 20, 1974 | CWF Show | Miami, Florida | 1 | 104 | | |
| 87 | Bill Watts | July 2, 1974 | CWF Show | Tampa, Florida | 1 | 112 | Defeats Robert Fuller, subbing for Ron. | |
| 88 | Dusty Rhodes | October 22, 1974 | CWF Show | Tampa, Florida | 1 | 21 | | |
| 89 | Bill Watts | November 12, 1974 | CWF Show | Tampa, Florida | 2 | 16 | | |
| 90 | Dusty Rhodes | November 28, 1974 | CWF Show | Jacksonville, Florida | 2 | 7 | | |
| 91 | Bill Watts | December 5, 1974 | CWF Show | Jacksonville, Florida | 3 | 82 | | |
| 92 | Bob Roop | February 25, 1975 | CWF Show | Tampa, Florida | 1 | 97 | | |
| 93 | Terry Funk | June 2, 1975 | CWF Show | West Palm Beach, Florida | 1 | 14 | | |
| 94 | Bob Roop | June 16, 1975 | CWF Show | West Palm Beach, Florida | 2 | N/A | | |
| 95 | Rocky Johnson | July 1975 (NLT) | CWF Show | N/A | 1 | N/A | | |
| 96 | Bob Roop | July 1975 (NLT) | CWF Show | N/A | 3 | N/A | | |
| 97 | Dusty Rhodes | September 16, 1975 | CWF Show | Tampa, Florida | 3 | 42 | | |
| — | | October 28, 1975 | — | — | | | After the match between Dusty Rhodes and King Curtis Iaukea. | |
| 98 | King Curtis Iaukea | November 27, 1975 | CWF Show | Jacksonville, Florida | 1 | 26 | Wins a 9-man tournament. | |
| 99 | Rocky Johnson | December 23, 1975 | CWF Show | Tampa, Florida | 2 | 8 | | |
| 100 | Bruiser Brody | December 31, 1975 | CWF Show | Tampa, Florida | 1 | 35 | | |
| 101 | Thunderbolt Patterson | February 4, 1976 | CWF Show | Tampa, Florida | 1 | 42 | | |
| 102 | Pak Song | March 17, 1976 | CWF Show | Miami, Florida | 2 | 2 | | |
| 103 | Jack Brisco | March 19, 1976 | CWF Show | St. Petersburg, Florida | 7 | 6 | One report says Brisco wins the title. | |
| 104 | Pak Song | March 25, 1976 | CWF Show | Florida | 3 | 23 | Song wrestles a title match against Jerry Brisco on April 7, 1976 in Miami Beach. | |
| 105 | Jack Brisco | April 17, 1976 | CWF Show | St. Petersburg, Florida | 8 | 38 | | |
| 106 | Bob Orton Jr. | May 25, 1976 | CWF Show | Tampa, Florida | 1 | 63 | | |
| 107 | Dusty Rhodes | July 27, 1976 | CWF Show | Tampa, Florida | 4 | 118 | | |
| 108 | "Superstar" Billy Graham | November 22, 1976 | CWF Show | West Palm Beach, Florida | 1 | 85 | | |
| 109 | Dusty Rhodes | February 15, 1977 | CWF Show | Tampa, Florida | 5 | N/A | | |
| — | | March 1, 1977 (NLT) | — | — | | | Title vacant when Dusty Rhodes was headed to Japan. | |
| 110 | Buddy Wolfe | March 8, 1977 | CWF Show | Tampa, Florida | 1 | 93 | Defeated Steve Keirn in tournament final. | |
| 111 | Dusty Rhodes | June 9, 1977 | CWF Show | Florida | 6 | 37 | | |
| 112 | Ernie Ladd | July 16, 1977 | CWF Show | Tallahassee, Florida | 1 | N/A | | |
| — | | August 1, 1977 (NLT) | — | — | | | Title was stripped due to Ladd leaving the territory. | |
| 113 | Dusty Rhodes | August 1, 1977 (NLT) | CWF Show | Florida | 7 | N/A | Returned to Rhodes due to the way Ladd wins. | |
| 114 | Lars Anderson | September 20, 1977 | CWF Show | Tampa, Florida | 1 | 67 | | |
| 115 | Dusty Rhodes | November 26, 1977 | CWF Show | St. Petersburg, Florida | 8 | 19 | | |
| 116 | Lars Anderson | December 15, 1977 | CWF Show | Jacksonville, Florida | 2 | 33 | | |
| — | Vacated | January 17, 1978 | — | — | — | — | | |
| 117 | Killer Karl Kox | January 18, 1978 | CWF Show | Miami, Florida | 1 | 49 | Defeats Lars Anderson for the vacant title. | |
| 118 | Rocky Johnson | March 8, 1978 | CWF Show | Miami, Florida | 3 | 5 | | |
| 119 | Bob Roop | March 13, 1978 | CWF Show | West Palm Beach, Florida | 4 | 13 | | |
| 120 | Jack Brisco | March 26, 1978 | CWF Show | Orlando, Florida | 8 | 58 | | |
| 121 | The Spoiler | May 23, 1978 | CWF Show | Tampa, Florida | 1 | 27 | | |
| 122 | Dusty Rhodes | June 19, 1978 | CWF Show | West Palm Beach, Florida | 9 | 96 | | |
| 123 | The Spoiler | September 23, 1978 | CWF Show | Lakeland, Florida | 2 | 17 | | |
| 124 | Steve Keirn | October 10, 1978 | CWF Show | Tampa, Florida | 1 | 14 | | |
| 125 | Pak Song | October 24, 1978 | CWF Show | Tampa, Florida | 4 | 8 | Defeat Mike Graham subbing for Steve Keirn. | |
| — | | November 1, 1978 | — | — | | | When NWA disallows Mike Graham to substitute in a championship match | |
| 126 | Dusty Rhodes | November 25, 1978 | CWF Show | St. Petersburg, Florida | 10 | 17 | Defeated Bob Roop in tournament final. | |
| 127 | Mr. Uganda | December 12, 1978 | CWF Show | Tampa, Florida | 2 | 7 | | |
| 128 | Jos LeDuc | December 19, 1978 | CWF Show | Tampa, Florida | 1 | 14 | | |
| 129 | Dick Slater | January 2, 1979 | CWF Show | Tampa, Florida | 1 | 7 | | |
| 130 | Jimmy Garvin | January 9, 1979 | CWF Show | Tampa, Florida | 1 | 127 | | |
| 131 | King Curtis Iaukea | May 16, 1979 | CWF Show | Tampa, Florida | 2 | 49 | | |
| 132 | Dusty Rhodes | July 4, 1979 | CWF Show | Miami Beach, Florida | 11 | 48 | | |
| — | | August 21, 1979 | — | — | | | Rhodes won NWA Worlds Heavyweight Championship. | |
| 133 | Terry Funk | September 2, 1979 | CWF Show | Tampa, Florida | 2 | 49 | Defeated Steve Keirn in tournament final. | |
| 134 | Manny Fernandez | October 21, 1979 | CWF Show | Orlando, Florida | 1 | 157 | | |
| 135 | Don Muraco | March 26, 1980 | CWF Show | Miami, Florida | 1 | 134 | | |
| 136 | Bugsy McGraw | August 7, 1980 | CWF Show | Melbourne, Florida | 1 | 65 | | |
| 137 | Bobby Jaggers | October 11, 1980 | CWF Show | Jacksonville, Florida | 1 | 15 | | |
| 138 | Dusty Rhodes | October 26, 1980 | CWF Show | Ft. Lauderdale, Florida | 12 | 9 | | |
| 139 | Dory Funk Jr. | November 4, 1980 | CWF Show | Tampa, Florida | 1 | 69 | | |
| 140 | Barry Windham | January 12, 1981 | CWF Show | West Palm Beach, Florida | 1 | 86 | | |
| 141 | Dory Funk Jr. | April 8, 1981 | CWF Show | Tampa, Florida | 2 | 125 | Won by forfeit-Windham injured in auto accident. | |
| 142 | Charlie Cook | August 11, 1981 | CWF Show | Tampa, Florida | 1 | 21 | | |
| 143 | Dory Funk Jr. | September 1, 1981 | CWF Show | Tampa, Florida | 3 | 20 | | |
| 144 | Charlie Cook | September 21, 1981 | CWF Show | Tampa, Florida | 2 | 43 | | |
| 145 | The Spoiler | November 3, 1981 | CWF Show | Tampa, Florida | 3 | 33 | | |
| 146 | Mr. Wrestling II | December 6, 1981 | CWF Show | Jacksonville, Florida | 1 | 110 | | |
| 147 | J. J. Dillon | March 26, 1982 | CWF Show | Orlando, Florida | 1 | 6 | | |
| 148 | Mr. Wrestling II | April 1, 1982 | CWF Show | St. Petersburg, Florida | 2 | 32 | | |
| 149 | Jimmy Garvin | May 3, 1982 | CWF Show | West Palm Beach, Florida | 2 | 69 | | |
| 150 | Brian Blair | July 11, 1982 | CWF Show | Orlando, Florida | 1 | 43 | | |
| — | | August 23, 1982 | — | — | | | Vacated after the match between Brian Blair and Bruiser Brody where declared the winner. | |
| 151 | Kevin Sullivan | October 6, 1982 | CWF Show | Tampa, Florida | 1 | 101 | Defeated Barry Windham in tournament final. | |
| 152 | Mike Graham | January 15, 1983 | CWF Show | Miami, Florida | 1 | 33 | | |
| — | | February 17, 1983 | — | — | | | When Graham has been injured. | |
| 153 | Scott McGhee | March 23, 1983 | CWF Show | N/A | 1 | N/A | Defeated Johnny Heffernan. | |
| 154 | Adrian Street | April 1983 (NLT) | CWF Show | Florida | 1 | N/A | | |
| 155 | Scott McGhee | April 1983 (NLT) | CWF Show | Florida | 2 | N/A | | |
| 156 | Jos LeDuc | July 23, 1983 | CWF Show | Lakeland, Florida | 2 | 56 | | |
| 157 | Barry Windham | September 17, 1983 | CWF Show | Sarasota, Florida | 2 | 1 | | |
| 158 | Jos LeDuc | September 18, 1983 | CWF Show | Orlando, Florida | 3 | 1 | | |
| 159 | Barry Windham | September 19, 1983 | CWF Show | West Palm Beach, Florida | 3 | N/A | | |
| — | | November 30, 1983 (NLT) | — | — | | | Windham went to tour Japan. | |
| 160 | Mike Rotunda | December 16, 1983 | CWF Show | St. Petersburg, Florida | 1 | 37 | Defeated Greg Valentine in a 5-man tournament final. | |
| 161 | Kendo Nagasaki | January 22, 1984 | CWF Show | Orlando, Florida | 1 | 67 | | |
| 162 | Billy Jack Haynes | March 29, 1984 | CWF Show | Orlando, Florida | 1 | 73 | | |
| 163 | "Superstar" Billy Graham | June 10, 1984 | CWF Show | Orlando, Florida | 2 | 49 | | |
| 164 | Scott McGhee | July 29, 1984 | CWF Show | Orlando, Florida | 3 | 77 | | |
| 165 | Jesse Barr | October 14, 1984 | CWF Show | Orlando, Florida | 1 | N/A | | |
| — | | December 27, 1984 (NLT) | — | — | | | Title held up after match between Jesse Barr and Brian Blair. | |
| 166 | Brian Blair | January 6, 1985 | CWF Show | Orlando, Florida | 2 | 37 | wins rematch. | |
| 167 | Jesse Barr | February 12, 1985 | CWF Show | Tampa, Florida | 2 | 75 | | |
| 168 | Hector Guerrero | April 28, 1985 | CWF Show | Orlando, Florida | 1 | 63 | | |
| 169 | Hercules Hernandez | June 30, 1985 | CWF Show | Orlando, Florida | 1 | 11 | | |
| — | | July 11, 1985 | — | — | | | Vacant after Hernandez fired for dressing room fight with Wahoo McDaniel. | |
| 170 | Jack Hart | July 23, 1985 | CWF Show | Tampa, Florida | 1 | 41 | Defeated Mike Graham in tournament final. | |
| 171 | Kendall Windham | September 2, 1985 | CWF Show | Tampa, Florida | 1 | 173 | | |
| 172 | The Cuban Assassin | February 22, 1986 | CWF Show | Tampa, Florida | 1 | 11 | | |
| 173 | Kendall Windham | March 5, 1986 | CWF Show | Tampa, Florida | 2 | 63 | | |
| — | | May 7, 1986 | — | — | | | Title vacated after the match between Kendall Windham and Bob Roop in which Barry Windham interfered to help Kendall win. | |
| 174 | Kendall Windham | May 18, 1986 | CWF Show | Orlando, Florida | 3 | 3 | Wins tournament final by forfeit when other semi-final match ends a double disqualification. | |
| 175 | The White Ninja | May 21, 1986 | CWF Show | Tampa, Florida | 1 | 11 | | |
| 176 | Kendall Windham | June 1, 1986 | CWF Show | N/A | 4 | 44 | Title returned after when Mutoh films show Ninja illegally used karate to win the belt. | |
| 177 | Ron Bass | July 15, 1986 | CWF Show | Tampa, Florida | 1 | 48 | | |
| 178 | Barry Windham | September 1, 1986 | CWF Show | Daytona, Florida | 4 | 15 | | |
| 179 | Ron Bass | September 16, 1986 | CWF Show | Tampa, Florida | 2 | 8 | | |
| 180 | Barry Windham | September 24, 1986 | CWF Show | Ft. Lauderdale, Florida | 5 | 9 | | |
| — | | October 3, 1986 | — | — | | | Title held up after match with Ron Bass where Bass used chloroform. | |
| 181 | Barry Windham | October 8, 1986 | CWF Show | Tampa, Florida | 6 | 48 | Wins the rematch. | |
| 182 | Kareem Muhammad | November 25, 1986 | CWF Show | Lakeland, Florida | 1 | 7 | | |
| 183 | Ron Simmons | December 2, 1986 | CWF Show | Tampa, Florida | 1 | 49 | | |
| 184 | Bad News Allen | January 20, 1987 | CWF Show | Tampa, Florida | 1 | 35 | | |
| 185 | Oliver Humperdink | February 24, 1987 | CWF Show | Tampa, Florida | 1 | 3 | | |
| 186 | Ed Gantner | February 27, 1987 | CWF Show | N/A | 1 | 16 | Humperdink gave him the title. | |
| 187 | Mike Rotunda | March 15, 1987 | CWF Show | Daytona, Florida | 2 | 77 | | |
| — | | May 31, 1987 | — | — | | | Title held up after match between Mike Rotunda and Dory Funk, Jr. | |
| 188 | Mike Rotunda | June 7, 1987 | CWF Show | Daytona, Florida | 3 | 233 | Wins the rematch. | |
| 189 | Rick Steiner | January 26, 1988 | CWF Show | N/A | 1 | N/A | Given by Rotunda after winning the NWA: World TV Title in Jim Crockett Promotions. | |
| — | | November 1988 | — | — | | | Mike Rotunda asked for the title back after Steiner had been champion for several months. Rick refused. NWA stripped Rick Steiner of the title, since he never officially won it, Title is abandoned by Jim Crockett Promotions while Steiner holds it. | |
Title renamed Florida Championship Wrestling (FCW) Florida Heavyweight Championship
| 190 | Dan Spivey | July 30, 1988 | FCW Show | Tampa, Florida | 1 | 45 | Defeated Dick Slater in a tournament final at the Eddie Graham Memorial Show. | |
| 191 | Dick Slater | September 13, 1988 | FCW Show | Tampa, Florida | 2 | 57 | Defeated Spivey in a Loser Leaves Town Match. | |
| 192 | U.S. Steel/Big Steel Man | November 9, 1988 | FCW Show | Tampa, Florida | 1 | N/A | | |
| 193 | The Terminator | December 1988 (NLT) | FCW Show | N/A | 1 | N/A | Sometime before November 6, 1988. | |
| 194 | Mike Graham | December 25, 1988 | FCW Show | Tampa, Florida | 2 | N/A | Defeated The Terminator. | |
Title renamed Pro Wrestling Federation (PWF) Florida Heavyweight Championship in February 1989
| 195 | Al Perez | March 11, 1989 | PWF Show | Tampa, Florida | 1 | 73 | | |
| 196 | Dustin Rhodes | May 23, 1989 | PWF Show | Tampa, Florida | 1 | 35 | | |
| 197 | Kendall Windham | June 27, 1989 | PWF Show | Tampa, Florida | 5 | 12 | | |
| 198 | Steve Keirn | July 9, 1989 | PWF Show | Tampa, Florida | 2 | N/A | | |
| 199 | Dan Spivey | November 1989 (NLT) | PWF Show | Orlando, Florida | 2 | N/A | | |
| 200 | Tyree Pride | June 29, 1991 | PWF Show | Tampa, Florida | 1 | N/A | | |
Reverted back to NWA Florida Heavyweight Championship
| 201 | Lou Perez | July 1992 (NLT) | PWF Show | Winter Haven, Florida | 1 | N/A | | |
| 202 | Steve Keirn | March 1993 (NLT) | PWF Show | Tampa, Florida | 3 | N/A | | |
| 203 | Lou Perez | May 1993 (NLT) | PWF Show | Winter Haven, Florida | 2 | N/A | | |
| 204 | Steve Keirn | December 1993 (NLT) | PWF Show | Tampa, Florida | 4 | N/A | | |
| 205 | Lou Perez | August 6, 1994 | PWF Show | Tampa, Florida | 3 | 457 | | |
| — | | November 6, 1995 | — | — | | | Perez injured. | |
| 206 | Hercules Hernandez | November 7, 1995 | PWF Show | Gainesville, Florida | 2 | 367 | Defeated Steve Collins in tournament final. | |
| 207 | Steve Keirn | November 8, 1996 | PWF Show | Gainesville, Florida | 5 | 364 | | |
| 208 | Dory Funk Jr. | November 7, 1997 | PWF Show | Gainesville, Florida | 4 | 1,012 | | |
| — | | August 15, 2000 | — | — | | | Vacated title for NWA Florida tournament. | |
| 209 | Adam Windsor | August 15, 2000 | PWF Show | Tampa, Florida | 1 | 92 | Defeated Chris Nelson in tournament final. | |
| — | | November 15, 2000 | — | — | | | | |
| 210 | Buck Quartermain | January 23, 2001 | PWF Show | Tampa, Florida | 1 | 263 | | |
| 211 | Cyborg | October 13, 2001 | NWA 53rd Anniversary Show | St. Petersburg, Florida | 1 | 149 | | |
| — | | March 11, 2002 | — | — | | | Stripped for no title defenses. | |
| 212 | Steve Corino | May 25, 2002 | PWF Show | St. Petersburg, Florida | 1 | 0 | Defeated Danny Doring in tournament final. | |
| 213 | Danny Doring | May 25, 2002 | PWF Show | St. Petersburg, Florida | 1 | 34 | | |
| 214 | Christopher Daniels | June 28, 2002 | PWF Show | St. Petersburg, Florida | 1 | 1 | Defeats Danny Doring, Mike Sullivan, and Scoot Andrews in a 4-way elimination match. | |
| 215 | Danny Doring | June 29, 2002 | PWF Show | Davie, Florida | 2 | 210 | Defeats Daniels and Scoot Andrews in a 3-way match. | |
| 216 | Billy Fives | January 25, 2003 | PWF Show | Pinellas Park, Florida | 1 | 0 | | |
| 217 | Agent Steele | January 25, 2003 | PWF Show | Pinellas Park, Florida | 1 | 21 | | |
| 218 | Billy Fives | February 15, 2003 | PWF Show | Davie, Florida | 2 | 154 | | |
| 219 | Scoot Andrews | July 19, 2003 | PWF Show | St. Petersburg, Florida | 1 | 126 | Defeats Billy Fives and Lex Lovett in 3-way match. | |
| 220 | Steve Madison | November 22, 2003 | PWF Show | St. Petersburg, Florida | 1 | 119 | | |
| 221 | Todd Shane | March 20, 2004 | PWF Show | St. Petersburg, Florida | 1 | 168 | | |
| 222 | Steve Madison | September 4, 2004 | PWF Show | Clearwater, Florida | 2 | N/A | | |
| 223 | Bruce Steele | November 20, 2004 | PWF Show | Brandon, Florida | 1 | N/A | Defeats Madison and Roderick Strong in a 3-way match. | |
| — | Deactivated | May 2006 | — | — | — | — | | |
NWA Pro Wrestling Fusion
| 224 | The Sheik | May 3, 2008 | Fusion Show | Ft. Pierce, Florida | 1 | 280 | | |
| 225 | Steve Madison | February 7, 2009 | Fusion Show | Ft. Pierce, Florida | 3 | 175 | | |
| 226 | The Sheik | August 1, 2009 | Fusion Show | Ft. Pierce, Florida | 2 | 287 | | |
| 227 | Tommy Taylor | May 15, 2010 | Fusion Show | Fort Pierce, Florida | 1 | N/A | Still champion as of November 16, 2010. | |
| 228 | Venom | April 28, 2012 (NLT) | Fusion Show | N/A | 1 | N/A | | |
| 229 | Deathrow Jethro | May 12, 2012 | Fusion Show | Winter Garden, Florida | 1 | N/A | Championship Wrestling from Florida leaves NWA in September 2012. | |
| 230 | Michael Tarver | February 2, 2013 | FUW Show | West Palm Beach, Florida | 1 | 210 | Won at NWA Florida Underground at BullyBash defeating Deimos for the vacant title. | |
| 231 | The Grease | August 31, 2013 | FUW Show | Tampa, Florida | 1 | 56 | Defeated Michael Tarver by DQ at NWA FUW Throwndown 6. | |
| 232 | Matt Morgan | October 26, 2013 | FUW Show | Port Richey, Florida | 1 | 118 | Replaced Davey Boy Smith, Jr. | |
| 233 | Michael Tarver | February 21, 2014 | FUW Show | Tampa, Florida | 2 | 14 | | |
| 234 | Wes Brisco | March 7, 2014 | FUW Show | Port Richey, Florida | 1 | 266 | | |
| 235 | JD Maverick | November 28, 2014 | FUW Show | Port Richey, Florida | 1 | 264 | | |
| — | | August 19, 2015 | — | — | | | Vacated due to an injury and the promotion leaves NWA in November 2015. | |
NWA Florida Wrestling Alliance
| 236 | Mason Price | February 21, 2016 | FWA Show | Masaryktown, Florida | 1 | 1,317 | Won at NWA Florida Wrestling Alliance Luck of the Draw tournament | |
| — | Deactivated | September 30, 2019 | — | — | — | — | | |

== See also ==
- Florida Championship Wrestling
- National Wrestling Alliance

== Sources ==
- Florida Heavyweight Championship at wrestling-titles.com
