= Jimmy Garvin =

American professional wrestler (born 1952)

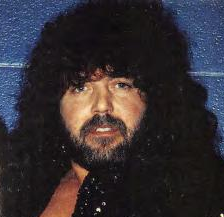
- Garvin, c. 1988

Personal information
- Born: James Williams; September 25, 1952 (age 74) Tampa, Florida, U.S.
- Spouse: Patricia Williams (m. 1972)
- Children: 2
- Family: Ron Garvin (stepfather); Valerie French (cousin)

Professional wrestling career
- Ring name(s): Beau James; Jimmy Garvin
- Billed height: 5 ft 10 in (178 cm)
- Billed weight: 235 lb (107 kg)
- Billed from: Tampa, Florida "Badstreet U.S.A"
- Debut: November 1968
- Retired: August 2, 2000

James Williams (born September 25, 1952) is an American retired professional wrestler, better known by the ring name Jimmy Garvin. A member of the Fabulous Freebirds, Garvin is best known for his appearances with promotions including the American Wrestling Association, World Class Championship Wrestling, and World Championship Wrestling.

== Early life ==
Williams grew up in Tampa, Florida, where he was an amateur wrestler.

== Professional wrestling career ==
=== Early career (1968–1975) ===
Garvin began his wrestling career in November 1968 at the age of 16 as Beau James. He soon took the name "Gorgeous Jimmy" Garvin and was given two kayfabe brothers, Terry and Ron Garvin, whom he briefly managed. They mainly wrestled for NWA Mid-America until the brothers broke up in 1975.

=== Mid-South and Florida (1976–1983) ===
After the Garvins disbanded, Garvin made his debut in Florida in 1976. He toured the Mid-South, Georgia Championship Wrestling, and Mid-Atlantic Championship Wrestling territories from 1978 until 1983. Also toured in Japan in 1980. In 1982, Garvin (while holding the NWA Florida Global Tag Team Championship with Big John Studd) won the NWA Southern Heavyweight Championship from Sweet Brown Sugar. As a reward, Garvin's manager, J. J. Dillon, presented him with a valet named Precious. The original Precious was not the same woman as Garvin's wife, Patti Williams, who would later assume the name Sunshine II then "Precious". During his title defenses, Garvin often became distracted by Precious and flaunted his good looks to impress her. This would cause his opponents to recover and attack him. Due to her quiet-but-distracting nature, Garvin quickly lost the NWA Southern Heavyweight Championship to Dusty Rhodes, while he and Studd lost the NWA Florida Global Tag Team Championship to Ron Bass and Barry Windham. Garvin replaced Precious with his cousin, Sunshine, and joined World Class Championship Wrestling in 1983. Garvin claimed in a shoot interview years later with Wrestling Perspective, that the onscreen relationship with Precious had been causing problems in his marriage.

=== World Class Championship Wrestling (1983–1984) ===
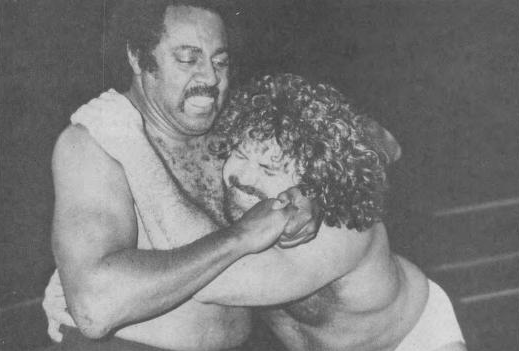
Garvin (right) wrestling Charlie Cook (left), c. 1983

Along with his valet Sunshine, Garvin competed in WCCW as a heel, refusing to wrestle on live TV before he started a feud with beloved David Von Erich, which he lost and ended up spending a day with Sunshine on David's ranch, doing ranch type duties such as washing the five dogs owned by David (as he relaxed and shot skeet right over Jimmy and Sunshine's heads) and relocating several bales of hay without the use of a truck. However, towards the end of the day, Garvin drew the line at cleaning out the old horse barn and the two went at it.

He next moved on to feud with Chris Adams. Around this time, he introduced his wife, Patti, as "Sunshine II", who was supposed to work as an assistant to the original Sunshine. After the interference of Sunshine II cost Garvin to lose the WCCW Television Championship to Johnny Mantell in October 1983, Sunshine II blamed the original Sunshine for the botch. Garvin then fired the original Sunshine and renamed Sunshine II as "Precious" (not to be confused with his original valet of the same name). Precious and Sunshine (now aligned with Chris Adams) feuded while Garvin traded the NWA American Heavyweight Championship with Adams. During this time, the couples competed in mixed tag-team matches. Sunshine temporarily left WCCW in 1984 (with the storyline excuse that she had been injured by Garvin and Precious) and was replaced in the feud with her "truck driving aunt", Stella Mae French (Tanya West). Adams and Stella Mae continued to compete in mixed tag team matches against Garvin and Precious until they defeated them in a "Loser Leaves Town" cage match in July 1984. Garvin and Precious then left World Class for the American Wrestling Association. Garvin and Adams would revive their feud ten years later in the Global Wrestling Federation, but the promotion went out of business before that angle got off the ground.

=== American Wrestling Association (1984–1986) ===
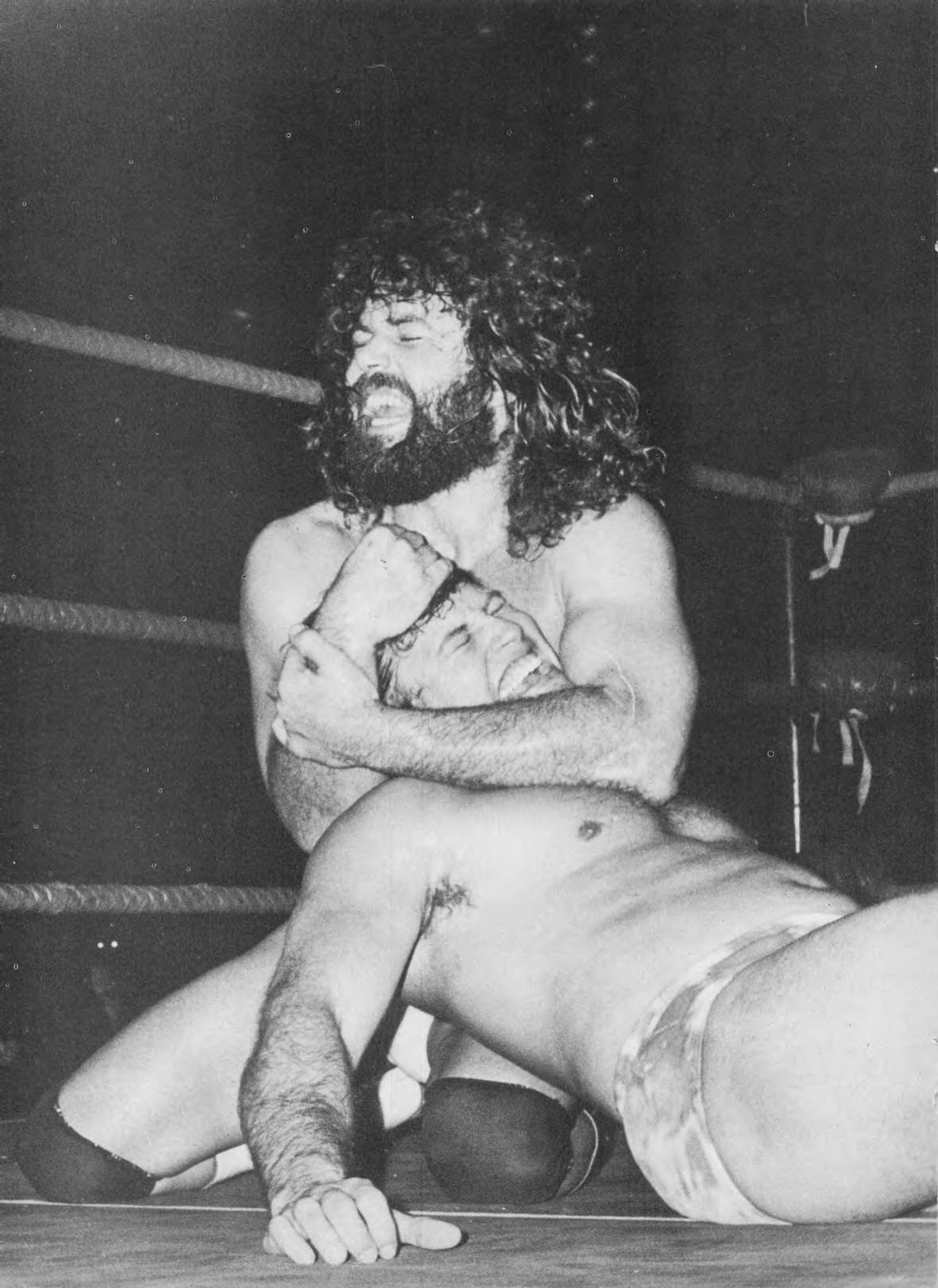
Garvin wrestling Rick Martel, c. 1985

Garvin debuted in the Minneapolis, Minnesota-based American Wrestling Association (AWA) in October 1984. From late-1984 to mid-1985, he repeatedly unsuccessfully challenged AWA World Heavyweight Champion Rick Martel.

At SuperClash in September 1985, Garvin unsuccessfully challenged Kerry Von Erich for the NWA Texas Heavyweight Championship.

In September 1985, Garvin and "Mr. Electricity" Steve Regal defeated the Road Warriors for the AWA World Tag Team Championship with the help of the Fabulous Freebirds. They held the titles until January 1986, when they lost to Curt Hennig and Scott Hall.

Garvin wrestled his final match for the AWA at WrestleRock 86 in April 1986, teaming with Michael Hayes in a loss to the Road Warriors in a steel cage match.

=== Jim Crockett Promotions / World Championship Wrestling (1986–1992) ===
==== Feuds with Wahoo McDaniel, Brad Armstrong and Magnum T. A. (1986–1987) ====
After losing the titles to Scott Hall and Curt Hennig in 1986 in Albuquerque, New Mexico, he went to the NWA's Jim Crockett Promotions. He debuted as a heel often taunting Wahoo McDaniel, calling him "Yahoo." Garvin and McDaniel would feud throughout the summer and fall of 1986 in a series of "Indian Strap" matches. He also feuded with Brad Armstrong and was in the middle of a feud with Magnum T. A. when Magnum had the car wreck that would end his career.

==== Feuds with The Midnight Express, Ric Flair, and Kevin Sullivan (1987–1988) ====
In 1987, Jimmy's "brother" Ron (Jimmy's real-life stepfather), was in a feud with Jim Cornette and his stable. During a match with Cornette's Midnight Express, Cornette threw fire in Ron's face. Several faces came out to help and then Jimmy ran out and helped take him to the back. Jimmy flew into a rage and stormed into the heel dressing room and brutally attacked Cornette and it took several wrestlers, heel and face, to pull him off of him. Jimmy and Ron's friend and partner Barry Windham then took Ron to the hospital.

Jimmy (and, by association, Precious) turned face and helped Ron feud with the Midnight Express. One of the bigger matches during that feud was when the two teams were matched against each other during the 1987 Jim Crockett Memorial Cup tag team tournament. The Midnight Express won by countout to advance.

Later that year, Jimmy had one of the most memorable feuds in his career with Ric Flair, who was eyeing Precious. He sent her gifts and this provided a dramatic buildup for a big cage match between Flair and Jimmy during the 1987 Great American Bash stop in Greensboro, North Carolina for Flair's NWA World Title. The stipulation was added that if Flair won the match, he would get a date with Precious. During the match, Jimmy attempted a leap frog at one point but landed on one knee instead of his feet. Pain in the knee was "sold" by him during the rest of the match. This match got so heated that a fan actually attempted to climb into the cage to help Garvin. The fan was stopped by David Crockett, who was calling the match along with Tony Schiavone, right before the fan was about to get in. Flair ended up winning the match when he put Jimmy in the figure four leglock, Jimmy blacked out from the pain in his knee and his shoulders hit the mat for a count of three. Ron Garvin then entered the cage when the match was over and attacked Flair in order to defend Jimmy from further damage to his knee. When the date with Precious that Flair won occurred, Flair and J. J. Dillon ended up being punched out by Ron Garvin, who was dressed in his "Miss Atlanta Lively" outfit. Just two months later, Ron successfully unseated Flair as NWA World Champion, holding on to the title until Starrcade '87 when Flair regained the belt.

In 1988, Garvin had a feud with Kevin Sullivan and his Varsity Club. This one was over Precious too but it was never made clear why Sullivan wanted her. He made references to her calling her "Patti" instead of Precious, possibly referring to the past somehow. Sullivan would stalk her and taunt her with papers in his robe, but they never revealed anything. Jimmy had some memorable matches during this feud including challenging Varsity Club member Mike Rotunda for the NWA World TV Title at Clash of the Champions I event during March of that year. Rotunda pinned Jimmy to retain the title.

During the 1988 Great American Bash in Baltimore, Maryland held in July, Jimmy and Sullivan each captained 5 men teams opposing each other in the first ever "Tower of Doom" match. This match was actually a copied idea from World Class Championship Wrestling based out of Dallas, Texas who held a similar match a short while before this. It involved three cages stacked up on top of each other. A member of each team would start out climbing a ladder and facing off in the top cage. Every few minutes, new members from each team would enter the top cage in a similar fashion. Every so often, the doors between the cages would open for ten seconds allowing wrestlers to slip through to the next level. Jimmy's teammates consisted of Ron Garvin, Steve Williams, and the Road Warriors. They were victorious over Sullivan's team but the feud between Jimmy and Sullivan was not quite yet over.

In September 1988, Garvin left to sell a broken leg that he had gotten from Sullivan and Mike Rotunda. On the September 3 edition of NWA World Championship Wrestling from the TBS studios, Sullivan broke cement blocks over Jimmy's leg. Jim Ross commentating at the time yelled out "He's breaking blocks all over his leg! Jesus!"

==== Fabulous Freebirds (1989–1992) ====
Garvin returned to Jim Crockett Promotions, now known as World Championship Wrestling, in June 1989 minus Precious and became the newest member of the Fabulous Freebirds (he had been associated with the Freebirds since 1983) by winning the World Tag Team Titles with Michael Hayes at Clash of the Champions VII. The titles were won as part of a tournament for them that had been ongoing. That night, Hayes and Garvin scored victories over the Dynamic Dudes in the semifinals and the Midnight Express (Bobby Eaton & Stan Lane) in the finals. They feuded with the Midnight Express some more following that, as well as Rick & Scott Steiner. Garvin had worked in the past with Hayes, Buddy Roberts and Terry Gordy during the height of the Freebird-Von Erichs feud in World Class, and was always considered "The fourth Freebird". In the fall of 1990, they also had a manager of sorts, "Little Richard Marley" (wrestler Rocky King), who lasted until Starrcade.

In February 1991, they added two managers, Big Daddy Dink & Diamond Dallas Page. In May 1991, they added a masked Freebird, Badstreet, and they feuded with The Young Pistols (Steve Armstrong & Tracy Smothers). By the summer of 1991, Badstreet and their managers were gone and the Freebirds had no direction. They briefly added Precious as their manager but she only made one appearance at WrestleWar '92. During this period, Hayes and Garvin won 2 World Tag Team titles, 1 World Six-Man Tag Team title (with Badstreet), and 2 United States Tag Team titles.

Following the arrival of Bill Watts as Executive Vice President of WCW the Freebirds were targeted for what would become a wave of budget cuts. Following a loss of the United States tag-team titles to Dick Slater and The Barbarian, Garvin was split from Hayes. He wrestled The Barbarian in singles matches in August 1992 and also began teaming with Tom Zenk. His final match with the company came on the October 10th episode of The Power Hour when he partnered with Zenk to face Butch Reed and The Barbarian.

=== World Wrestling Federation (1992) ===
After leaving WCW in September 1992, Garvin received a try-out with the World Wrestling Federation. Garvin participated in an unaired interview segment hosted by Gene Okerlund at a television taping on October 26, 1992, in Springfield, Illinois where he insulted the Ultimate Maniacs (a team composed of Ultimate Warrior and "Macho Man" Randy Savage) and predicted that all of the heels would win at the 1992 Survivor Series. Garvin did not sign with the company, and afterwards took a hiatus from pro wrestling, learning to become a commercial airline pilot.

Garvin's voice from the un-aired segment — along with Okerlund's — would be sampled into the title track of the album WrestleMania.

=== World Championship Wrestling (1994) ===
In February 1994, Garvin made one final appearance in WCW at SuperBrawl IV when he replaced Michael Hayes in a losing effort against Johnny B. Badd.

=== Global Wrestling Federation (1994) ===
After SuperBrawl IV, Garvin went to the Global Wrestling Federation (GWF), where he reformed the Freebirds with Terry Gordy and Hayes. He won the Tag Team Titles with Gordy in 1994. They were the last champions before the promotion folded in September 1994 and he retired shortly thereafter. Before the promotion folded, Garvin was scheduled to feud with Chris Adams over the GWF North American Heavyweight Championship.

=== Late career (1994–2000) ===
After GWF, Garvin worked in the independent circuit. In April 1994, he fought Shane Douglas twice, once in a double countout and a loss to Douglas in Lawrence County, Pennsylvania and Weirton, West Virginia for United States Wrestling League. He defeated Greg Valentine for the ACW Heavyweight title on November 11, 1995, in High Point, North Carolina. On February 10, 1996, he lost to Ultimate Warrior in an independent show in Princeton, West Virginia.

On August 9, 1999, he reunited with Ron Garvin in Montreal as they teamed with Michel DuBois when they lost to Rougeau family - Jacques Jr., Jacques Sr. and Raymond at Lutte 2000 L'Union Fait La Force III. The Garvins won the Johnny Rougeau Tag Team Titles when they defeated Raymond and Jacques Rougeau Jr. on December 29, 1999, in Montreal. His last match was in Verdun, Quebec on August 2, 2000, when they dropped the titles to Raymond and Jacques Jr.

=== Retirement ===
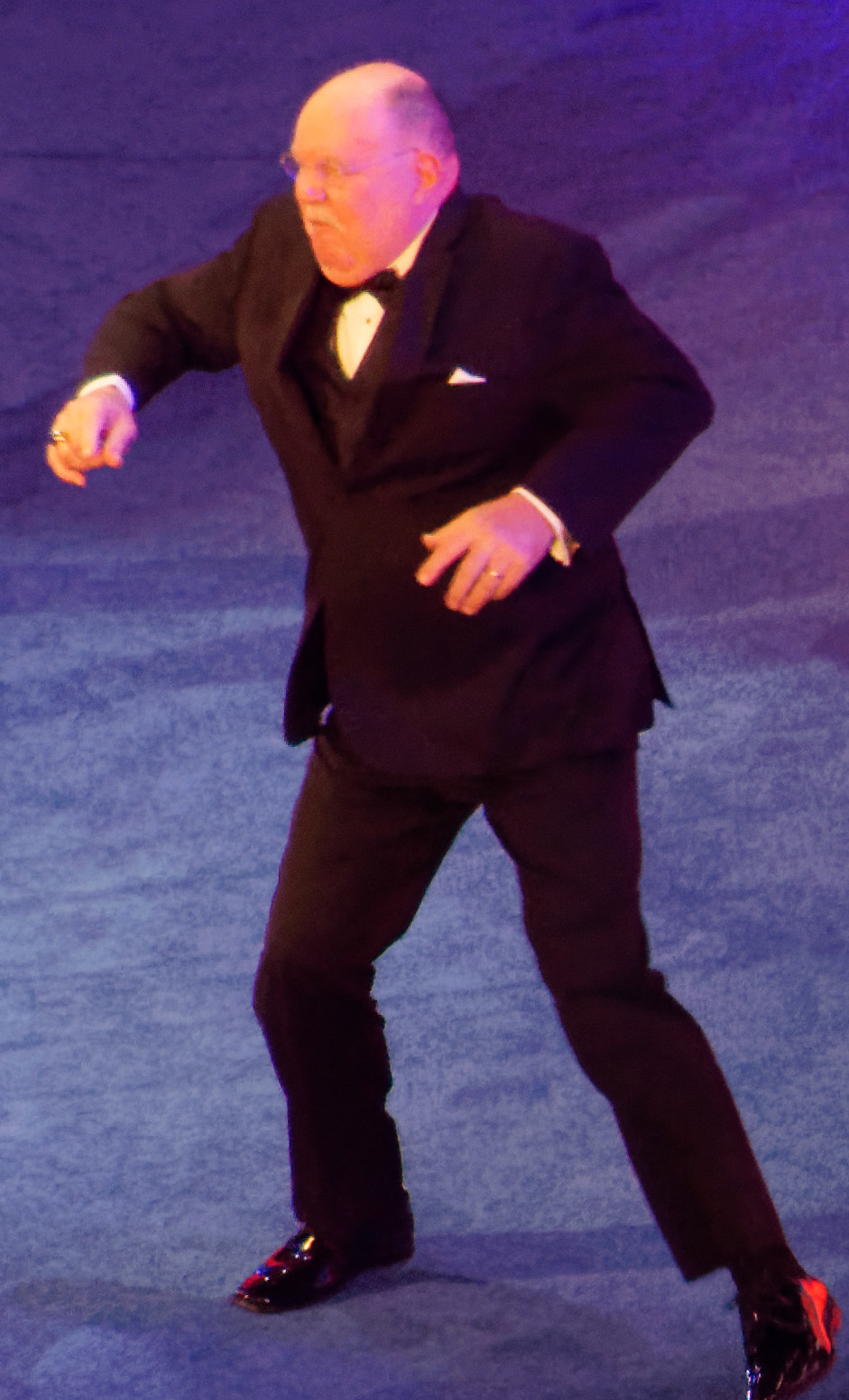
Garvin at the WWE Hall of Fame in 2016

Garvin prominently appears in The Triumph and Tragedy of World Class Championship Wrestling DVD released by World Wrestling Entertainment in late 2007. The DVD was composed of interviews with former WCCW stars as well as footage and matches from various WCCW broadcasts.

Garvin also appeared on an installment of "Legends" on WWE Classics on Demand discussing managers. Garvin spoke on a number of subjects, including the often contentious relationship between Sunshine, Precious and Missy Hyatt, as well as his own experiences as a manager.

On April 2, 2016, Garvin was inducted into the WWE Hall of Fame as part of The Fabulous Freebirds.

== Personal life ==
Married in 1972, Williams and his wife Patti Williams (born January 1, 1955), better known as Precious, have two daughters. Williams and his wife are involved in a ministry for the poor and homeless.

Garvin's stepfather is professional wrestler Ron Garvin.

Since his retirement from professional wrestling, Garvin has become an Airline Transport Pilot working for NetJets.

== Championships and accomplishments ==
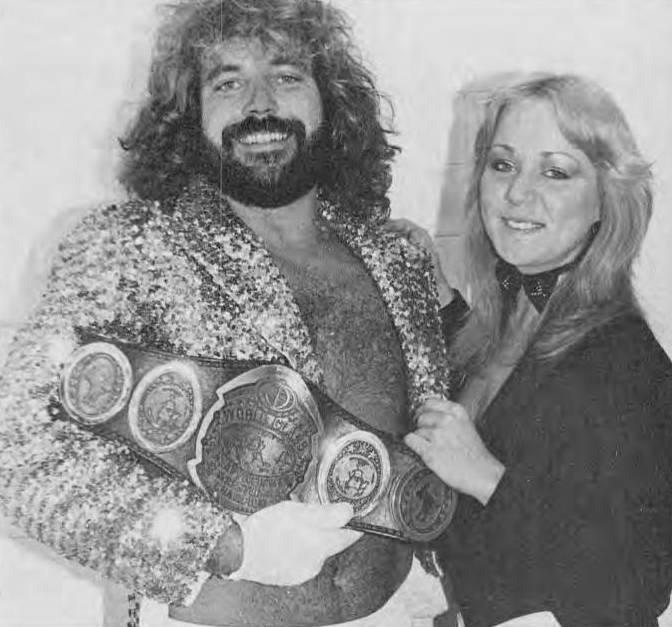
Garvin (left), as the NWA American Heavyweight Champion, with his valet Sunshine (right), circa 1983

- American Wrestling Association
  - AWA World Tag Team Championship (1 time) - with Steve Regal
- Championship Wrestling from Florida
  - NWA Florida Bahamian Championship (1 time)
  - NWA Florida Global Tag Team Championship (1 time) - with Big John Studd
  - NWA Florida Heavyweight Championship (2 times)
  - NWA Florida Tag Team Championship (2 times) - with Steve Keirn (1 time) and Jack Brisco (1 time)
  - NWA Southern Heavyweight Championship (Florida version) (2 times)
  - NWA United States Tag Team Championship (Florida version) (2 times) - with Killer Kox
- Continental Wrestling Association
  - AWA Southern Tag Team Championship (1 time) - with “Cowboy” Bob Ellis
- George Tragos/Lou Thesz Professional Wrestling Hall of Fame
  - Jack Brisco Spotlight Award 2026
- Global Wrestling Federation
  - GWF Tag Team Championship (1 time) - with Terry Gordy
- NWA Tri-State / Mid-South Wrestling
  - Mid-South Louisiana Heavyweight Championship (1 time)
  - NWA United States Tag Team Championship (Tri-State version) (1 time) - with Herb Calvert
- Pro Wrestling Illustrated
  - PWI ranked him No. 61 of the top 500 singles wrestlers in the PWI 500 in 1992
  - PWI ranked him No. 150 of the top 500 singles wrestlers of the "PWI Years" in 2003
- World Championship Wrestling
  - WCW United States Tag Team Championship (2 times) - with Michael Hayes
  - WCW World Six-Man Tag Team Championship (1 time) - with Michael Hayes and Badstreet
  - WCW World Tag Team Championship (2 times) - with Michael Hayes
- World Class Championship Wrestling
  - NWA American Heavyweight Championship (4 times)
  - NWA Texas Heavyweight Championship (2 times)
  - WCCW Television Championship (1 time)
- WWE
  - WWE Hall of Fame (Class of 2016) as a member of The Fabulous Freebirds

== See also ==
- Fabulous Freebirds
