= Scott McGhee =

English professional wrestler (born 1959)

Scott McGee
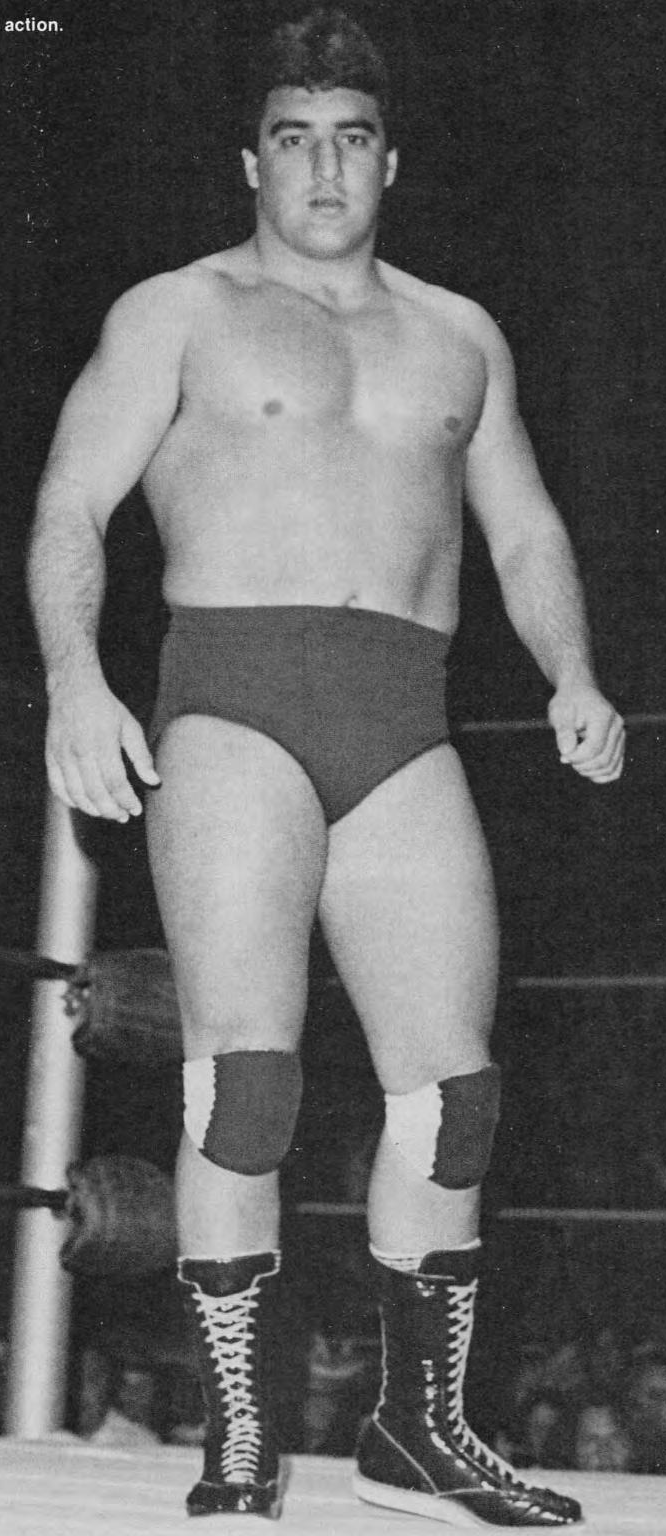
- McGhee in 1983

Personal information
- Born: Garfield Portz; 1 May 1959 (age 67) Shipley, West Yorkshire, England, United Kingdom

Professional wrestling career
- Ring name(s): Garfield Portz; Gary Portz; Geoff Portz Jr. Pat McGhee; Scott McGhee; Scotty McGhee; Scott Shannon
- Billed height: 6 ft 1 in (1.85 m)
- Billed weight: 242 lb (110 kg)
- Trained by: Ric Flair; Karl Gotch; Geoff Portz; Buddy Rogers; Ricky Steamboat
- Debut: 1978
- Retired: November 2010

Garfield Portz (born 1 May 1959) is an English retired professional wrestler, better known by his ring name, Scott McGhee. He is best known for his appearances in the United States with Championship Wrestling from Florida, Jim Crockett Promotions, and the World Wrestling Federation in the 1980s. Portz is the son of professional wrestler Geoff Portz (1931–2016).

== Professional wrestling career ==
=== Early career (1978–1980) ===
Portz was born in the United Kingdom. He relocated to the United States with his father, professional wrestler Geoff Portz. In the late-1970s, he began working as a referee for the professional wrestling promotion Jim Crockett Promotions. He trained as a wrestler under his father along with Ric Flair, Karl Gotch, Buddy Rogers, and Ricky Steamboat, debuting in Jim Crockett Promotions in 1978. He briefly performed in Canada in 1980, wrestling for Stampede Wrestling as "Gary Portz" and for Maple Leaf Wrestling as "Scott McGhee".

=== Championship Wrestling from Florida (1980–1985) ===
McGhee began wrestling for the Tampa, Florida-based promotion Championship Wrestling from Florida in 1980. He won his first championship in October 1980, teaming with Barry Windham to win a tournament for the NWA Florida Tag Team Championship. Their reign lasted until December 1980, when they were defeated by The Cowboy Connection.

In late 1982, McGhee often teamed with Dusty Rhodes, Magnum T. A. and Blackjack Mulligan on the promotions weekly television program.

In mid-1982, McGhee toured Japan with New Japan Pro-Wrestling, where he regularly teamed with André the Giant and Canek. In the same year, he competed for the Dothan, Alabama-based promotion Southeastern Championship Wrestling, winning the NWA Southeastern United States Junior Heavyweight Championship on three occasions.

In 1983, McGhee began wrestling for the Portland, Oregon-based promotion Pacific Northwest Wrestling as "'Irish' Pat McGhee". He won the NWA Pacific Northwest Tag Team Championship with Curt Hennig in December 1983, holding the championship until February 1984.

After winning a championship tournament for the NWA Florida Heavyweight title in 1983, he faced Ric Flair and Harley Race in a series of matches however failed to win the NWA World Heavyweight Championship. After losing the title to Jos LeDuc later that year, he left the promotion to compete in the Mid Atlantic territory, appearing at Starcade 1983 teaming with Johnny Weaver against Kevin Sullivan and Mark "Purple Haze" Lewin. He also briefly appeared under the name "Irish" Pat McGhee in Pacific Northwest Wrestling, winning the PNW tag titles with Curt Hennig on 23 December 1983.

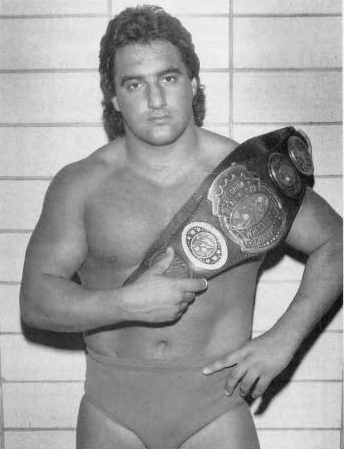
Scott McGhee as NWA Florida Heavyweight Champion, circa 1984

Upon his return to Florida, he immediately defeated "Superstar" Billy Graham to regain the Florida heavyweight title. However, following Eddie Graham's suicide, McGhee left the Florida territory in late 1985.

=== World Wrestling Federation (1985–1987) ===
McGhee joined the World Wrestling Federation in 1985, making his debut at a house show in Springfield, MA on 21 September. McGee was victorious in his first match and pinned Rene Goulet. He initially received a push out of the gate, defeating Goulet in a rematch on Prime Time Wrestling and Les Thornton on the 13 October episode of All American Wrestling. He sustained his first defeat when he submitted to Greg Valentine's figure four in a televised tag-team match that saw him team with Paul Roma against Valentine & Brutus Beefcake on the 26 October episode of Championship Wrestling. Later that fall he faced Randy Savage and Adrian Adonis on the house show circuit.

By 1986, McGee primarily appeared on house shows as a jobber, making a handful of appearances on All-Star Wrestling, WWF Championship Wrestling, WWF Prime Time Wrestling, and WWF Superstars of Wrestling. He entered the year wrestling on the house show circuit in opening match encounters, wrestling Tiger Chung Lee, Les Thornton, and Barry O to draws and pinning Joe Mirto, Rene Goulet, and Ron Shaw. He was less successful against more established veterans higher in the card and fell to Hercules Hernandez, Jake Roberts, and Dory Funk Jr. After several months of defeats, McGee rebounded to defeat Johnny K-9 on the May 19th episode of Prime Time Wrestling. That would remain his one victory on television for some time as he saw further losses on the WWE's various programs. He remained mired as an opening card performer for the remainder of the year, but did close out December with victories over Frenchy Martin and Barry O on the house show circuit.

That momentum temporarily halted, as McGee wrestled Tama on 19 January episode of Prime Time Wrestling (taped 3 January) and was defeated. He rebounded to defeat Barry O and The Red Demon on the house show circuit that month, then beat Terry Gibbs in a televised match in Philadelphia on 10 January. McGee then teamed with former WWF World Tag Team Champion Tony Garea in a losing effort to the Hart Foundation on 24 January episode of WWF Superstars. McGee's final WWF match came at a house show on 11 November 1987 in West Palm Beach, Fl, where he teamed with Ken Patera against Demolition.

=== Later career (1987–1988, 1989, 2010) ===
McGhee returned to the independent circuit in 1987. In late-1987 he began wrestling for Stampede Wrestling as "Garfield Portz". On 31 January 1988 he suffered a severe stroke, forcing him to retire from professional wrestling. McGhee subsequently trained as a nurse.

McGhee broke his retirement in October 1989, wrestling a single bout for the Professional Wrestling Federation. He returned to wrestling once again in November 2010, wrestling for NWA Wrestle Birmingham.

== Championships and accomplishments ==
- Championship Wrestling from Florida
  - NWA Florida Global Tag Team Championship (4 times) - with Magnum T. A. (3 times) and Mike Graham (1 time)
  - NWA Florida Heavyweight Championship (3 times)
  - NWA Florida Tag Team Championship (1 time) - with Barry Windham
- Pacific Northwest Wrestling
  - NWA Pacific Northwest Tag Team Championship (1 time) - with Curt Hennig
- Pro Wrestling Illustrated
  - PWI ranked him #387 of the 500 best singles wrestlers of the "PWI Years" in 2003
- Southeastern Championship Wrestling
  - NWA Southeast United States Junior Heavyweight Championship (3 times)

== See also ==
- List of family relations in professional wrestling
