= NWA Florida Global Tag Team Championship =

Professional wrestling tag team championship

Details
- Promotion: Championship Wrestling from Florida
- Date established: October 30, 1982
- Date retired: September 1983
Statistics
- Most reigns: The Fabulous Kangaroos (4 reigns as a tag team); Terry Allen (5 reigns as individual)

The NWA Florida Global Tag Team Championship was a major tag team title in Championship Wrestling from Florida from 1982 until fall 1983, when it was replaced by the NWA Florida United States Tag Team Championship.

== Title history ==
Key
No.	Overall reign number
Reign	Reign number for the specific team—reign numbers for the individuals are in parentheses, if different
Days	Number of days held

No.	Champion	Championship change			Reign statistics		Notes	Ref.
No.	Champion	Date	Event	Location	Reign	Days	Notes	Ref.
1	Big John Studd and Jimmy Garvin	October 30, 1982	CWF show	Tampa, Florida	1	15	Won an 8-tag team tournament to become first champions.	
2	Barry Windham and Ron Bass	November 14, 1982	CWF show	Florida	1	52		
3	The Fabulous Kangaroos (Don Kent and Johnny Heffernan)	January 5, 1983	CWF show	Miami, Florida	1	13		
4	Terry Allen and Scott McGhee	January 18, 1983	CWF show	Tampa, Florida	1	7		
5	The Fabulous Kangaroos (Don Kent and Johnny Heffernan)	January 25, 1983	CWF show	Miami, Florida	2	21		
6	Terry Allen (2) and Dusty Rhodes	February 15, 1983	CWF show	Tampa, Florida	1	(Note: The exact date on which the title was lost is unknown, which means the title reign lasted between 1 and 13 days.)		
7	Terry Allen (3) and Scott McGhee	February 1983	CWF show	Florida	2	(Note: The exact date on which the title was won is unknown, which means the title reign lasted between 8 and 21 days.)	Rhodes left the company and gave his half of the championship to McGhee.	
8	The Fabulous Kangaroos (Don Kent and Johnny Heffernan)	March 8, 1983	CWF show	Florida	3	23		
9	Terry Allen (4) and Scott McGhee	March 31, 1983	CWF show	Florida	3	(Note: The exact date the championship was won is unknown, which means the title reign lasted between 1 and 1 days.)		
10	The Fabulous Kangaroos (Don Kent and Johnny Heffernan)	April 1983	CWF show	Florida	4	(Note: The exact date the championship was won is unknown, which means the title reign lasted between 1 and 13 days.)		
11	Terry Allen (5) and Brad Armstrong	April 13, 1983	CWF show	Miami, Florida	1	25		
12	Angelo Mosca and Bobby Duncum	May 8, 1983	CWF show	West Palm Beach, Florida	1	58		
13	Mike Graham and Scott McGhee (4)	July 5, 1983	CWF show	Tampa, Florida	1	26		
14	The Muslim Connection (Elijah Akeem and Kareem Muhammed)	July 31, 1983	CWF show	Florida	1	(Note: The exact date on which the title was abandoned is unknown, which means the title reign lasted between 32 and 61 days.)		
—	Deactivated	September 1983	—	—	—	—	Championship replaced by the NWA United States Tag Team Championship (Florida version)	

== See also ==
- List of National Wrestling Alliance championships
- Florida Championship Wrestling
- NWA Florida United States Tag Team Championship
