= Precious (wrestling) =

Canadian professional wrestling valet (born 1955)

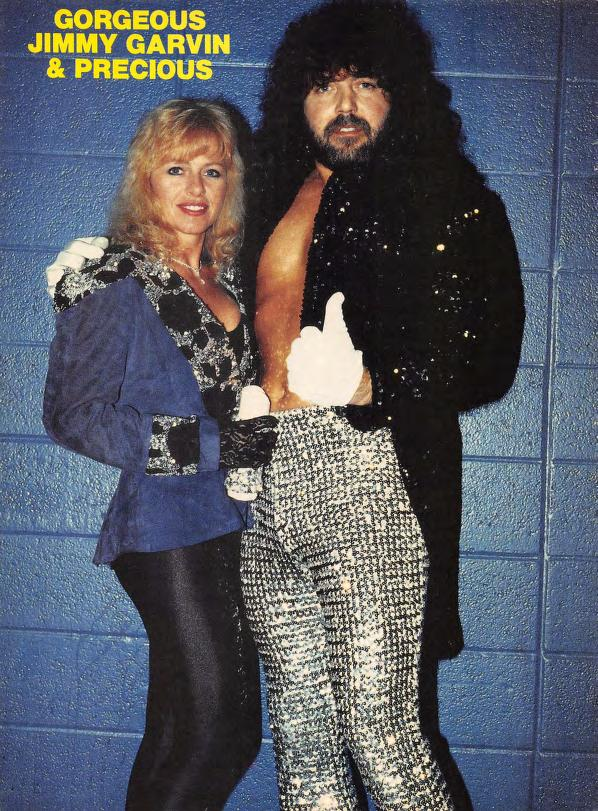
- Precious with Jimmy Garvin in 1988

Personal information
- Born: June 4, 1955 (age 71) North Bay, Ontario, Canada
- Spouse: Jimmy Garvin (m. 1972)
- Children: 2

Professional wrestling career
- Ring name(s): Precious; Sunshine II
- Debut: 1983
- Retired: September 1992

Patricia Williams (born June 4, 1955) is a Canadian retired professional wrestling valet better known by her ring name, Precious. She is the real-life wife of Jimmy Garvin, whom she managed for much of her career.

== Professional wrestling career ==
=== World Class Championship Wrestling (1983–1984) ===
Patti Williams made her professional wrestling debut in 1983 for the Dallas–based World Class Championship Wrestling. She was brought in by Garvin to be an assistant to his valet at the time, Sunshine, who gave her the name "Sunshine II". On October 31, 1983, Garvin fired the original Sunshine for causing him to lose the WCCW Television Championship to Johnny Mantell. Garvin kept Sunshine II as his valet and changed her name to "Precious," the name previously used by Garvin's original valet.

Precious's first big rivalry alongside Garvin was with Sunshine, who aligned herself with Chris Adams, with whom Garvin would feud over the NWA American Heavyweight Championship. She would wrestle three mixed tag team matches in 1984: one with Adams and Sunshine on May 6, and two with Adams and Stella Mae French on June 16, and a steel cage losers leaves town match on July 4.

=== American Wrestling Association (1984–1986) ===
After a tour with All Japan Pro Wrestling, Precious and Jimmy Garvin went over to the Minneapolis, Minnesota–based American Wrestling Association in 1984. After Garvin's feud with Rick Martel over the AWA World Heavyweight Championship, she steered Garvin onto the AWA World Tag Team Championship, held by The Road Warriors. With "Mr. Electricity" Steve Regal joining the couple, she led Garvin and Regal to win the titles from the Warriors on September 29, 1985, with the help of Garvin's friends from WCCW, The Fabulous Freebirds. After Garvin and Regal lost the titles to Scott Hall and Curt Hennig in January 1986, Precious and Garvin left the territory.

=== Jim Crockett Promotions / World Championship Wrestling (1986–1988, 1992) ===
Precious and Jimmy Garvin joined the Charlotte, North Carolina–based Jim Crockett Promotions in 1986. For the Jim Crockett Sr. Memorial Cup Tournament in April, they selected Black Bart to team with Garvin; they defeated Brett Sawyer and David Patterson in the first round, but lost to Giant Baba and Tiger Mask II in the second round. In September 1986, Precious and Garvin chose future Four Horsemen member Tully Blanchard to join forces with them for the tournament to determine the inaugural NWA United States Tag Team Champions; they defeated Jimmy Valiant and Manny Fernandez in the first round, but lost to The Kansas Jayhawks (Dutch Mantel and Bobby Jaggers) in the semi-finals.

In February 1987, Precious turned babyface alongside Jimmy Garvin and joined forces with her brother-in-law Ron Garvin (actually Precious' stepfather-in-law). In the summer of 1987, Precious played a major part in a feud between the Garvins and Ric Flair, where Flair tried to woo Precious, even buying her a mink coat. After defeating Jimmy Garvin in a cage match, Flair won the right to spend the night with Precious, but she and the Garvins got the last laugh, as Flair instead spent the night with Miss Atlanta Lively (Ron Garvin in drag), setting the stage for Ron to win the NWA World Heavyweight Championship from Flair.

In 1988, Precious and the Garvins feuded with The Varsity Club, especially Kevin Sullivan. Jimmy tried winning the NWA World Television Championship from Mike Rotunda several times, but ended up losing due to Sullivan's interference. Throughout the feud, Sullivan played mind games with the Garvins over Precious, including calling her by her real name and stalking her with papers in his robe. On July 10, at The Great American Bash, Precious was involved in the Tower Of Doom match, where she held the key to the door of the larger, bottom part of the triple-tier steel cage. The Garvins, The Road Warriors, and Dr. Death Steve Williams won the match, but after the match, Sullivan took the key and locked himself in with Precious, before being saved by Road Warrior Hawk. On the September 3 episode of World Championship Wrestling, Precious and Jimmy Garvin were scheduled to wrestle Mike Rotunda for the NWA World Television title, but before the match was scheduled to start, Sullivan grabbed Precious, causing Jimmy Garvin to go after Sullivan, before being jumped by Rotunda and Steiner, before Sullivan slammed concrete blocks onto Garvin's leg. It was her last appearance for four years.

Precious briefly returned to WCW in May 1992 at WrestleWar, aligning herself with The Fabulous Freebirds, which consisted of her husband Jimmy Garvin and Michael Hayes, who had just won the WCW United States Tag Team titles from Greg Valentine and Terry Taylor. She retired after Garvin left WCW in September of that year.

== Personal life ==
Williams married Jimmy Garvin in 1972. Together, they have two daughters and they are involved in a ministry for the poor and homeless.
