= Magnum T. A. =

American professional wrestler (born 1959)

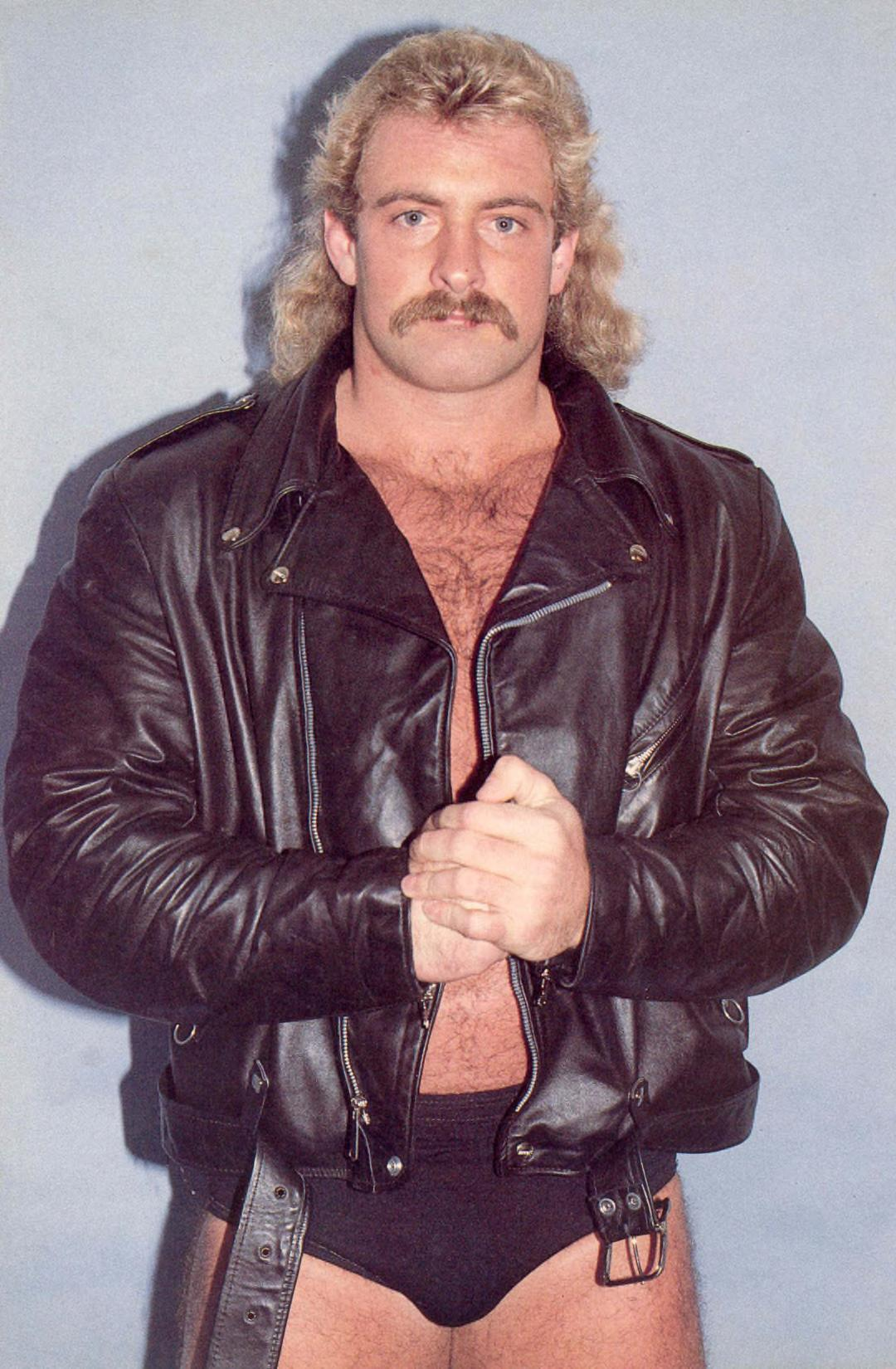
- Magnum T. A., circa 1985

Personal information
- Born: Terry Wayne Allen; June 11, 1959 (age 67) Chesapeake, Virginia, U.S.
- Relative: Cody Rhodes (Godson)

Professional wrestling career
- Ring name(s): Jesse James; Magnum T. A. Terry Allen
- Billed height: 6 ft 1 in (185 cm)
- Billed weight: 245 lb (111 kg)
- Billed from: Virginia Beach, Virginia
- Trained by: Pete Robinson
- Debut: 1981
- Retired: 1986

Terry Wayne Allen (born June 11, 1959) is an American retired professional wrestler, better known by his ring name, Magnum T. A. Allen won the NWA United States Heavyweight Championship twice and was being groomed for a potential run with the NWA World Heavyweight Championship, but a car crash in 1986 forced him into retirement. After retiring, Magnum T. A. continued to appear in non-wrestling roles for multiple promotions.

== Early life ==
Allen attended Norfolk Collegiate School in Norfolk, Virginia. He was a member of the collegiate wrestling team and won the state championship in the 167-pound division. After graduating high school, he attended Old Dominion University.

== Professional wrestling career ==
=== Early career (1981–1984) ===
Allen started wrestling in 1981 and joined the National Wrestling Alliance (NWA), where he began competing for the Championship Wrestling from Florida and the Pacific Northwest Wrestling (PNW) territories. While in the CWF, Allen won the Global Tag Team Championship on five occasions before then moving to Mid-South Wrestling. Upon debuting in Mid-South, Allen renamed himself "Magnum T. A." and adopted a character known as the "American Heart Throb", based on Allen's slight resemblance to actor Tom Selleck, who at the time was starring in the popular television series Magnum, P.I.. Allen adopted the ring name after André the Giant suggested that he combine the Magnum name with the initials of his real name. After competing in Mid-South, he won the North American Heavyweight Championship, his first major title, after defeating Mr. Wrestling II on May 13, 1984. Magnum would hold the title for five months before he lost it to the " Big Cat" Ernie Ladd on October 27."Mid-South Wrestling (10.27.1984) Review". 411 Mania. On November 22, Magnum lost to Ladd via disqualification in a title rematch.

=== Jim Crockett Promotions (1984–1986) ===
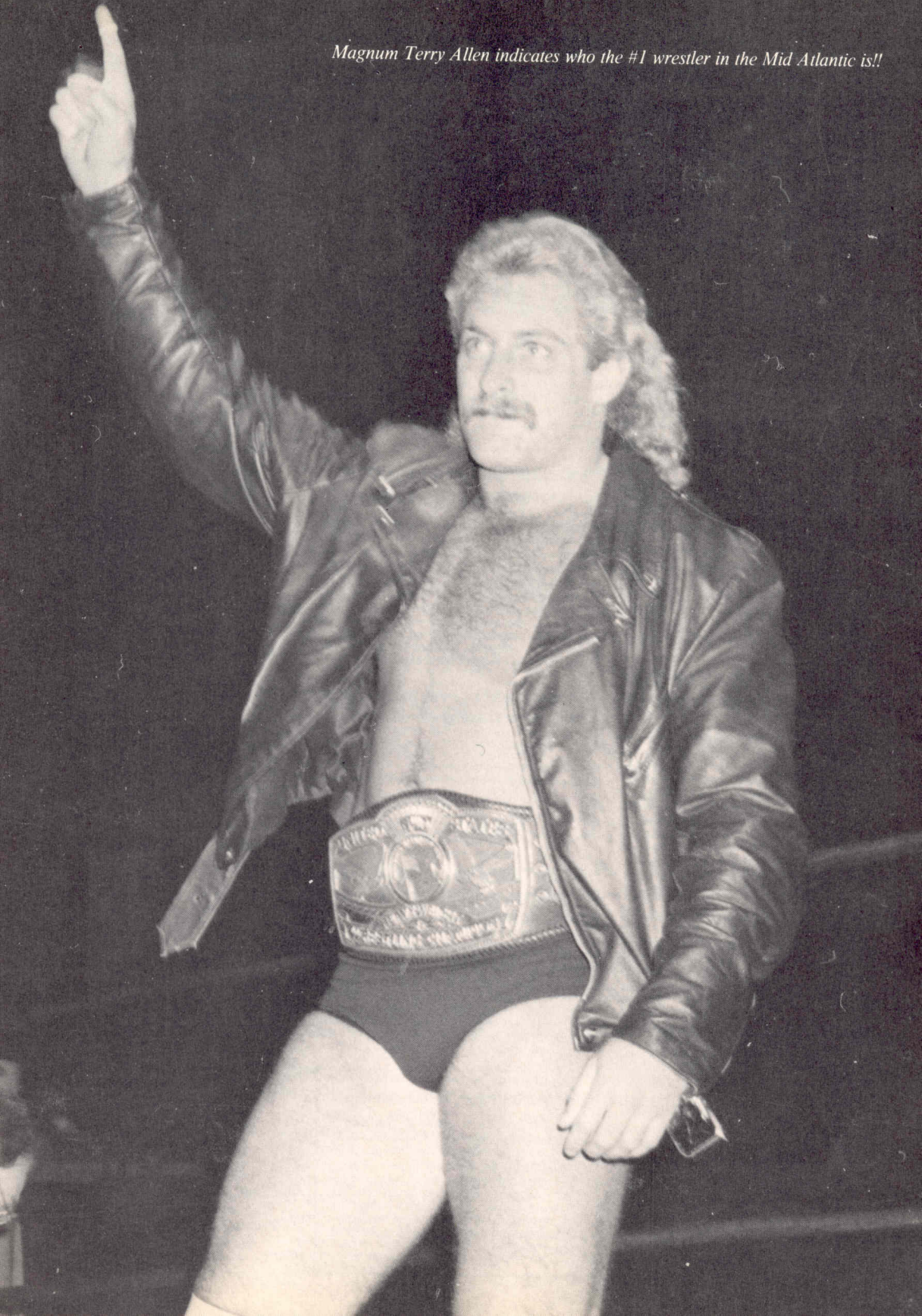
Magnum T. A. as NWA United States Heavyweight Champion, circa 1985

In 1984, the National Wrestling Alliance's Jim Crockett Promotions signed Allen. After debuting, Magnum began feuding with Wahoo McDaniel and defeated him for the United States Heavyweight Championship on March 23, 1985. At The Great American Bash, he successfully defended the title by defeating Kamala. He then began feuding with the Four Horsemen before feuding solely with Horsemen member Tully Blanchard and his valet Baby Doll, losing the title to him on July 21. On September 28, Magnum lost to the Horsemen's leader Ric Flair in a nearly 30-minute title match for Flair's World Heavyweight Championship. Magnum regained the U.S. title from Blanchard in the famous "I Quit" match at Starrcade on November 28, 1985.

In April 1986, Magnum began feuding with Ivan Koloff, who had started proclaiming that his nephew, Nikita, would become the United States Heavyweight Champion. Jim Crockett Jr. set up a contract signing for Magnum to defend his title against Nikita in May. At the signing, Magnum brought his mother, Marion, while Nikita brought Ivan. However, Nikita insulted Magnum's mother during the signing, instigating a fight. Then-president of the NWA, Bob Geigel, issued a public reprimand against Magnum for "conduct unbecoming a champion." Magnum replied, "Reprimand this!" while punching Geigel. As a result, Magnum was stripped of his title and it was put up in a best of seven series between Magnum and Nikita. After losing the first three matches in a row to Nikita, Magnum began a comeback, winning the next three matches to keep the series going. In the tie-breaking match on August 17, 1986, in Charlotte, North Carolina, Nikita defeated Magnum to win the title with help from Ivan and Krusher Khruschev.

=== Car crash and retirement ===
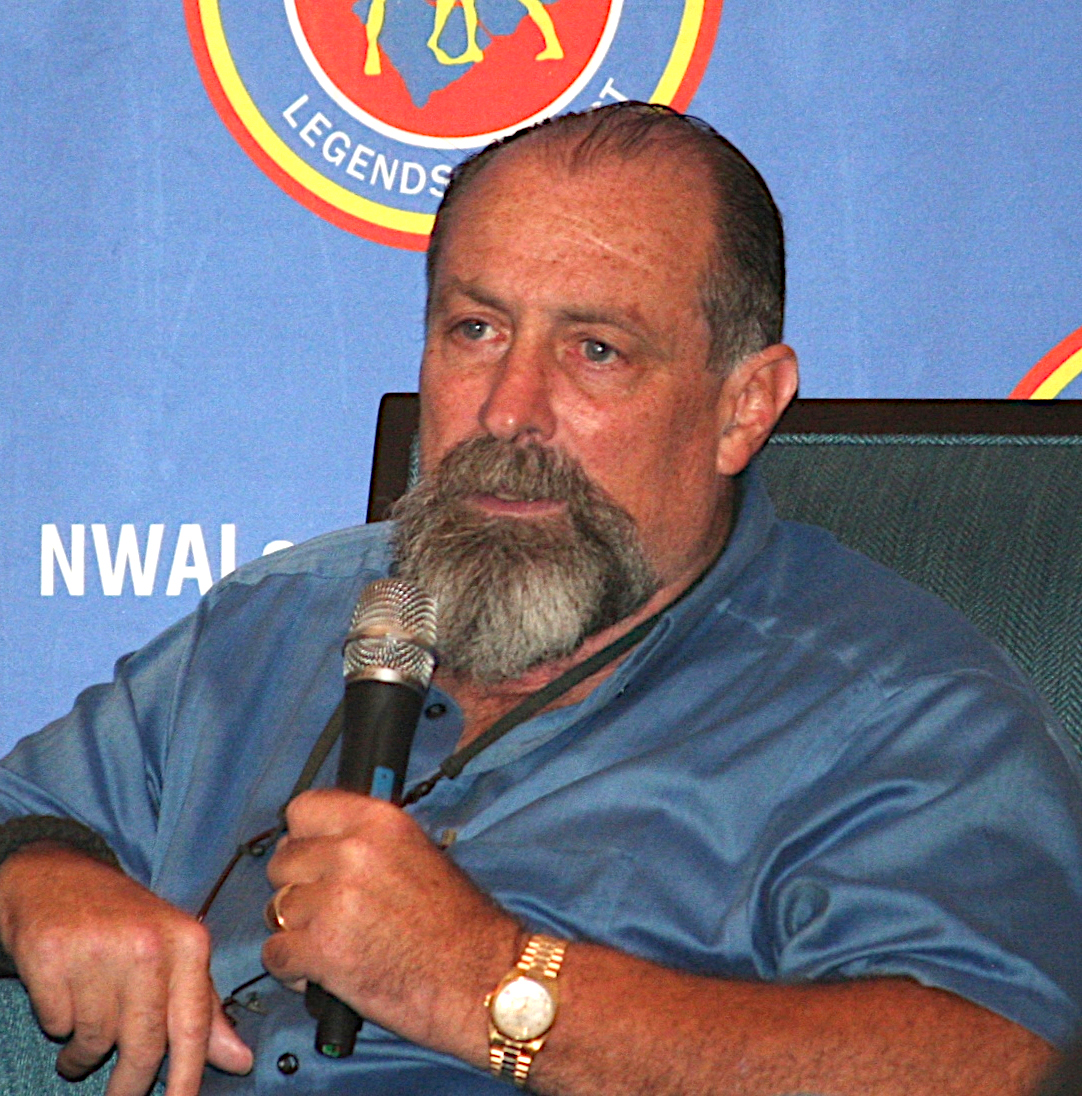
Magnum T. A. in 2016

On October 14, 1986, Allen was driving in his Porsche in very heavy rain, hydroplaned and lost control, striking a telephone pole. The wreck happened on Sardis Road in Charlotte, North Carolina, only a couple of miles from his home. Initially, investigators believed he was speeding, but forensic reports showed he was driving the speed limit and he was left in his car for two hours before a witness called 911. The wreck caused his C-4 and C-5 vertebrae to "explode", and it was doubted at the time whether he would ever walk again. Doctors at Carolinas Medical Center said Allen's physical conditioning saved his life. The right side of his body was paralyzed for months, ending his in-ring career. Losing Allen as a wrestler prompted NWA booker Dusty Rhodes to turn Nikita Koloff, Allen's last rival prior to his wreck, into a babyface. According to the storyline, Koloff gained respect for Magnum from their feud and wanted to take his place. This was memorialized in the spring edition of the Wrestling '87 magazine, with a large photograph of Koloff with the words "I cry for Magnum T. A." beside him. Prior to his wreck, Magnum was to win the U.S. Title for the third time before being groomed to become the NWA World Heavyweight Champion. Magnum's first on-screen appearance following the wreck was on TBS's Super Towns on the Superstation, in an interview with Tony Schiavone. His first appearance in front of a live crowd was at the Crockett Cup in 1987, where, with the aid of a cane and two referees, Magnum walked to ringside to embrace Dusty and Nikita, who would go on to defeat Tully Blanchard and Lex Luger for the tournament championship. Magnum (as "The Boss" Magnum T. A.) hosted an interview segment titled Straight Talk with The Boss on NWA World Wide Wrestling in 1988.

Magnum later worked as a commentator for the NWA, UWF, and World Championship Wrestling (WCW), and also served as a manager for Rhodes and Koloff. In his last angle in WCW in March 1988, Magnum was attacked by his former rival Tully Blanchard, which prompted Dusty Rhodes to come to the aid of his friend. Rhodes was subsequently suspended and returned as The Midnight Rider, managed by Magnum. After Rhodes signed with Championship Wrestling from Florida and later the World Wrestling Federation (WWF), and Koloff signed with the American Wrestling Association (AWA), Magnum left JCP as well, although he would make sporadic reappearances with the promotion until 1993 at Slamboree.

On May 20, 1995, Allen appeared as part of a legends recognition at Smoky Mountain Wrestling's "Carolina Memories" show in Charlotte. On January 14, 2005, Allen made an appearance as a guest at the Exodus Wrestling Alliance. He would later appear for the Carolina Wrestling Association in the corner of Jason Jones during Jones' loss to George South, Jr. on May 21. At the event Tribute To Starrcade on November 19, Magnum stood in Rhodes' corner as he lost to Tully Blanchard. On June 24, 2007, Allen, as Magnum T. A., made his first appearance for World Wrestling Entertainment (WWE) at their Vengeance: Night of Champions pay-per-view (PPV), where he was noted as a former United States Champion.

On March 3, 2024, Allen was shown in the crowd during Sting's retirement match at AEW's Revolution alongside Nikita Koloff and Scotty Riggs.

== Personal life ==
Allen is stepfather to professional wrestler Tessa Blanchard, who moved in with him and her siblings and her mother Courtney Shattuck at age 4. He works as a manager at a network-solutions company and resides in Charlotte.

== Championships and accomplishments ==
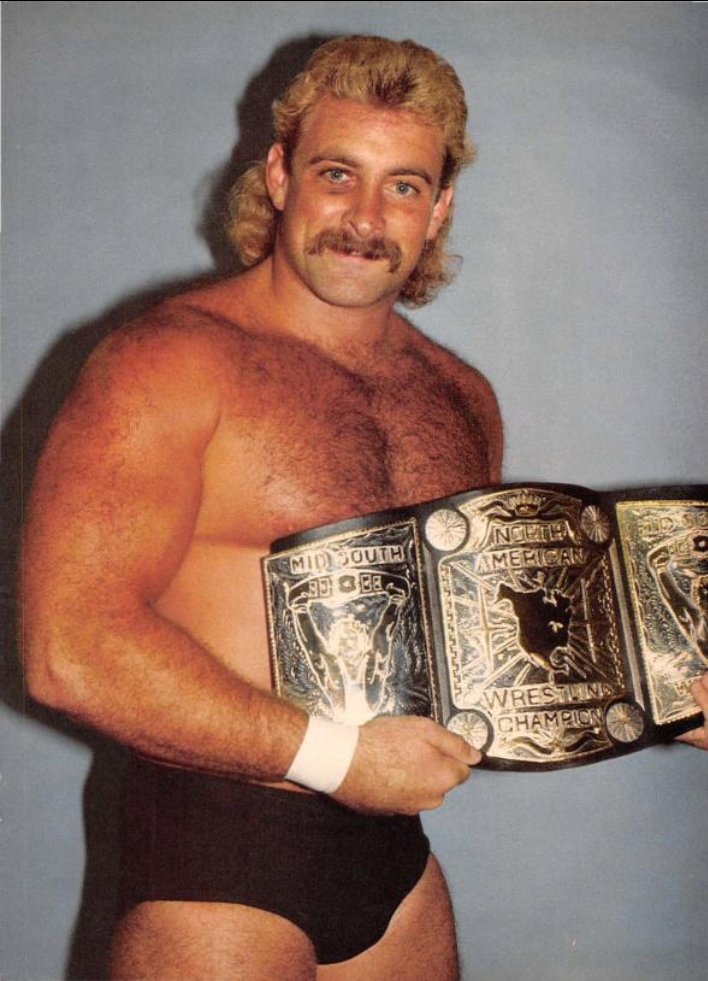
Magnum T. A. as Mid-South North American Heavyweight Champion in 1984.

- Championship Wrestling from Florida
  - NWA Florida Global Tag Team Championship (5 times) – with Scott McGhee (3), Dusty Rhodes (1), and Brad Armstrong (1)
- George Tragos/Lou Thesz Professional Wrestling Hall of Fame
  - Lou Thesz World Heavyweight Championship Award (2017)
- Jim Crockett Promotions
  - NWA United States Heavyweight Championship (2 times)
- Mid-South Wrestling
  - Mid-South North American Heavyweight Championship (2 times)
  - Mid-South Tag Team Championship (2 times) – with Jim Duggan (1) and Mr. Wrestling II (1)
- Pro Wrestling Illustrated
  - Ranked No. 73 of the 500 best singles wrestlers of the "PWI Years" in 2003
- Professional Wrestling Hall of Fame and Museum
  - Class of 2020
