= Dusty Rhodes =

American professional wrestler (1945–2015)

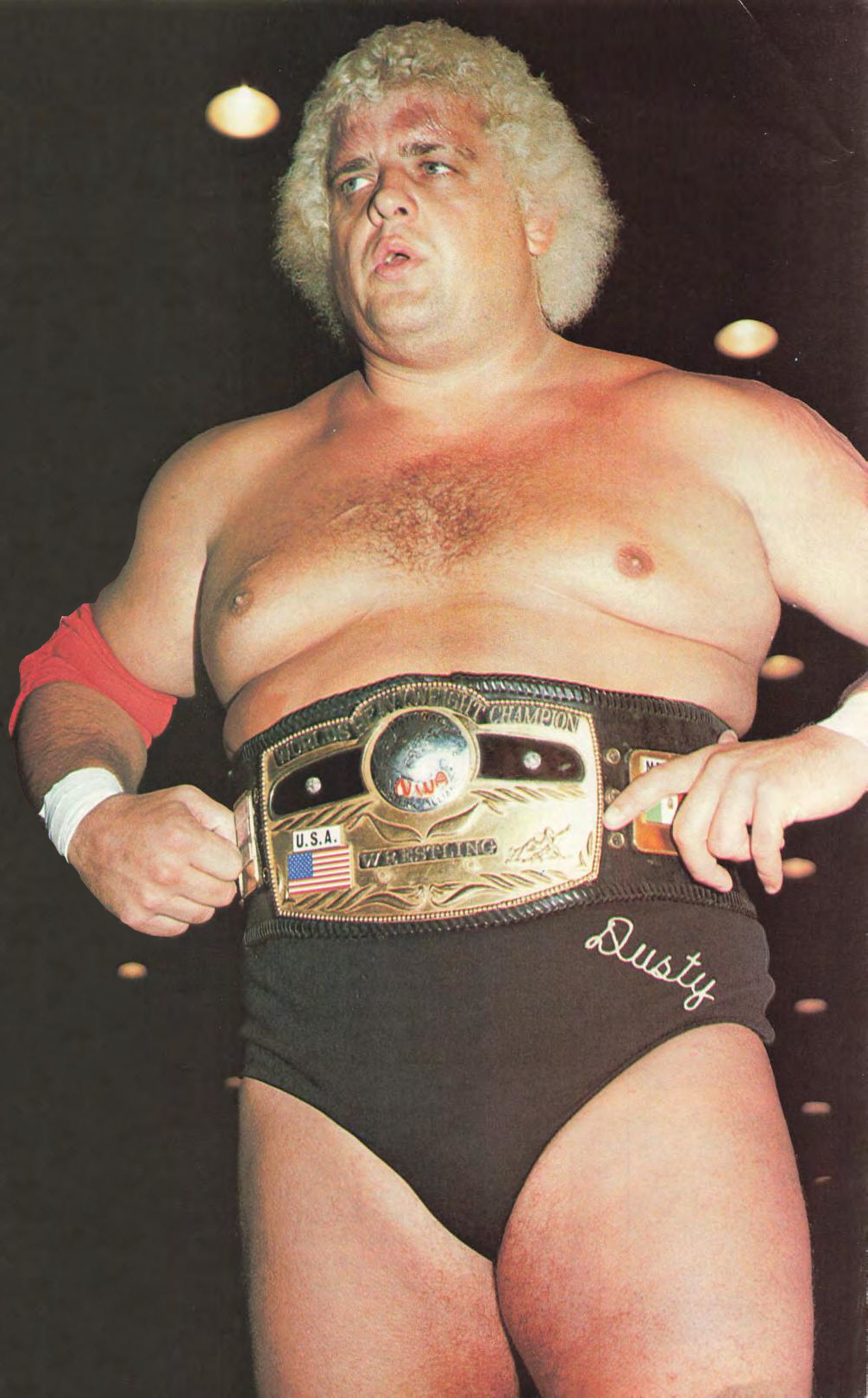
- Rhodes as the NWA World Heavyweight Champion, c. 1980s

Personal information
- Born: Virgil Riley Runnels Jr. October 11, 1945 Austin, Texas, U.S.
- Died: June 11, 2015 (aged 69) Orlando, Florida, U.S.
- Cause of death: Kidney failure
- Education: West Texas State University
- Spouses: Sandra McHargue (m. 1965; div. 1975); Michelle Rubio (m. 1978)
- Children: 4, including Dustin and Cody Rhodes
- Family: Brandi Rhodes (daughter-in-law); Fred Ottman (brother-in-law); Jerry Sags (brother-in-law); Wayne Rhodes (grandson); Wyatt Rhodes (grandson)

Professional wrestling career
- Ring name(s): The Bounty Hunter; Dusty Rhodes; Dusty Runnels; The Midnight Rider; Mr. Ichiban; Uvalde Slim
- Billed height: 6 ft 2 in (188 cm)
- Billed weight: 275 lb (125 kg)
- Billed from: Austin, Texas; Diablo Canyon, Colorado
- Trained by: Joe Blanchard
- Debut: 1967
- Retired: 2010

Virgil Riley Runnels Jr. (October 11, 1945 – June 11, 2015), better known as "The American Dream" Dusty Rhodes, was an American professional wrestler, booker, and trainer who worked for the National Wrestling Alliance and the World Wrestling Federation, later known as WWE. Rhodes was considered a star wrestler and presented the persona of an American everyman: the American Dream personified.

Rhodes was a three-time NWA World Heavyweight Champion, and during his time in Jim Crockett Promotions/World Championship Wrestling, he was a United States Heavyweight Champion, and multi-time World Television, World Tag Team and World Six-Man Tag Team Champion. He also won many regional championships, and is one of seven men inducted into each of the WWE, WCW, Professional Wrestling, and Wrestling Observer Newsletter Halls of Fame. His sons, Dustin and Cody, both pursued careers in professional wrestling, currently performing for All Elite Wrestling and WWE, respectively.

Following his retirement from wrestling, he made occasional on-air appearances on WWE television and pay-per-views and worked as a backstage booker and producer in WWE's NXT developmental territory. Billed as "the son of a plumber", Rhodes did not have a typical wrestler's physique; his character was that of the "common man", known for the personality exhibited in his interviews. WWE chairman Vince McMahon remarked that no wrestler "personified the essence of charisma quite like Dusty Rhodes".

== Early life ==
Virgil Riley Runnels Jr. was born on October 11, 1945, in Austin, Texas.

After graduating from Albert Sidney Johnston High School in Austin, Rhodes played baseball and football at Sul Ross State University in Alpine, Texas, before transferring to West Texas State (now known as West Texas A&M University). Turning professional, he then played for the Hartford Charter Oaks in the Continental Football League until the team folded.

== Professional wrestling career ==
=== Early career (1967–1974) ===
In 1967, Rhodes saw an advertisement in the newspaper for Tony Santos' professional wrestling promotion Big Time Wrestling based in Boston. Rhodes drove to Boston, and despite not having any wrestling experience, bluffed his way into working for the company by using his real life friendships with Bobby Duncum and the Funk brothers. Billed as Dusty Runnels, one of his first matches was for the BTW World Heavyweight title against champion Frank Scarpa in the Boston Arena. Having little money, Rhodes slept in his car and spent Thanksgiving with Rufus R. Jones in a Boston soup kitchen.

Rhodes moved on to Fritz Von Erich's Texas territory World Class Championship Wrestling in 1968, at that time also called Big Time Wrestling. It was in Texas where Rhodes first adopted the ring name "Dusty Rhodes". Upon meeting Rhodes, Gary Hart suggested that he change his ring name to "Lonesome Rhodes", a character Andy Griffith portrayed in the film A Face in the Crowd. Rhodes reportedly replied: "Well ... I don't plan on being 'Lonesome'. I think I'll stick with Dusty." Hart took an immediate liking to Rhodes and convinced Von Erich of the young wrestler's potential. Rhodes became a rule-breaking heel with Hart as his manager, teaming with Don Jardine, better known as The Spoiler.

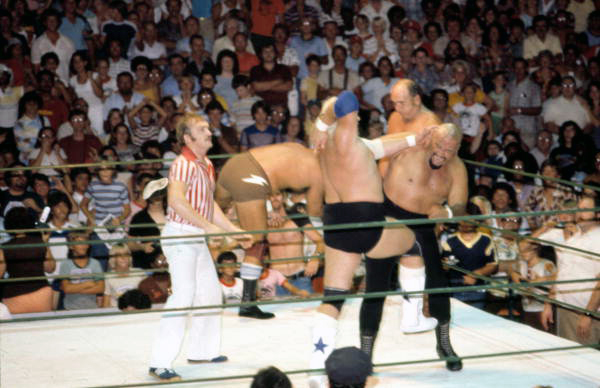
Rhodes performing his finishing maneuver, the Bionic Elbow, in 1979

In 1968, Rhodes left Texas and entered the Kansas City territory, tagging with fellow Texan Dick Murdoch to form the tag team The Texas Outlaws. The team traveled both nationally and internationally, appearing in Big Time Wrestling (Texas), NWA Western States Sports (Texas), NWA Detroit, National Wrestling Federation (NWF), Championship Wrestling from Florida, World Championship Wrestling (Australia), Tri-State Wrestling, the American Wrestling Association (AWA), and International Wrestling Enterprise (Japan).

=== National Wrestling Alliance territories (1974–1984) ===
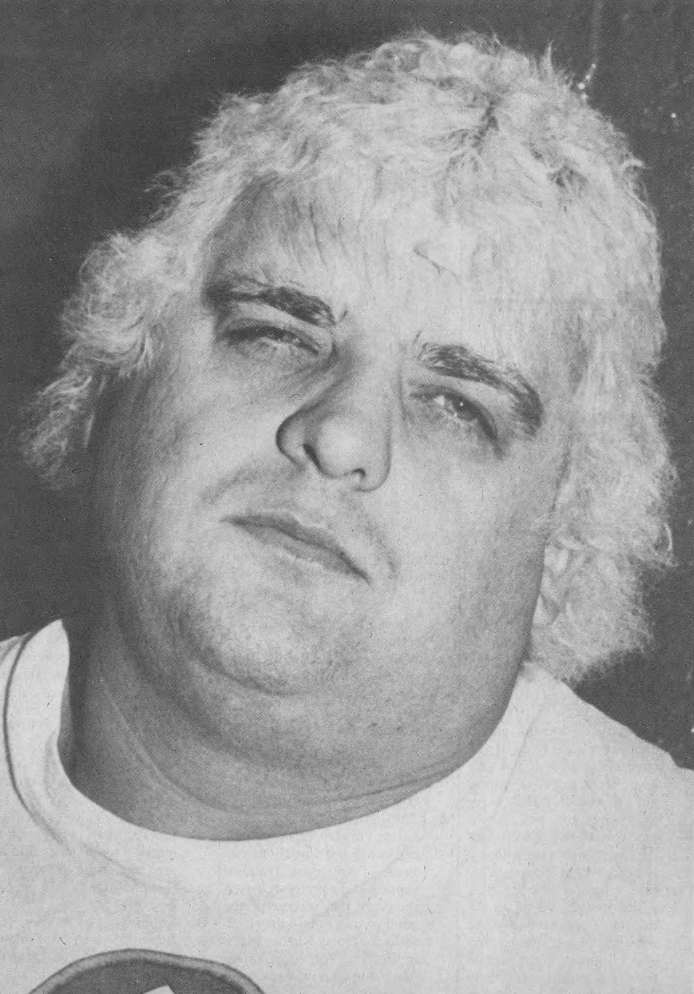
Rhodes c. 1982

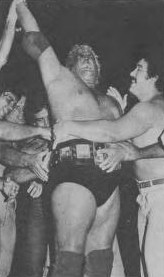
Rhodes wins the NWA World Heavyweight Championship, c. 1979

Rhodes did not have a typical wrestler's physique, but he was well known for his personality, charisma and interviews. In 1974, Rhodes's character became a hero after he turned on tag team partner Pak Song and manager Gary Hart after Song accidentally hit Rhodes during a match in Florida against Eddie and Mike Graham. This led him to break out as a solo wrestler, primarily in Florida, referring to himself as the "American Dream", a working class hero, aligning himself with Eddie Graham and becoming one of the most beloved and in demand wrestlers in the entire business.

On August 21, 1979, “The American Dream” Dusty Rhodes defeated Harley Race to win the NWA World Heavyweight Championship. His reign was brief — Race regained the title just days later.

Following that, Rhodes continued to work in NWA territories (especially Florida and the Mid-Atlantic) as a top babyface. He eventually reacquired the NWA World title in later years (he became a three-time champion overall) as his status grew.

By the mid-1980s, Dusty had begun transitioning into a behind-the-scenes role in Jim Crockett Promotions (JCP) as a booker / creative force. He is credited with conceiving or helping name key “supercard” events and gimmicks (e.g. WarGames, BattleBowl) and popularizing what came to be called the “Dusty finish” — matches ending in controversial referee situations.

In 1983, Dusty Rhodes was the driving force behind the first Starrcade event (titled Starrcade ’83: A Flare for the Gold) under the NWA/JCP banner. He helped originate the idea, named the show, and booked its matches. The headline was a rematch between Ric Flair and Harley Race, with the narrative of Race’s ruthless tactics and Flair’s underdog status establishing the drama.

Starrcade ’83 was a success: it drew about 15,447 in attendance at the Greensboro Coliseum (plus closed-circuit audiences) and cemented the concept of an annual “supercard” event for JCP/NWA.

Thus, between 1979 and Starrcade ’83, Rhodes went from a major champion to influential architect of the NWA/JCP promotional direction and helped lay the foundation for what would become their flagship annual event.

In 1977, Rhodes wrestled for Vince McMahon Sr.'s World Wide Wrestling Federation (WWWF) on and off for lengthy periods of time until 1983. During that time, Rhodes main-evented twice in Madison Square Garden, both times challenging for the WWWF Heavyweight Championship against reigning champion Superstar Billy Graham. Rhodes won the first match on September 26 via countout, and lost the second, a Texas Death match, on October 24. Graham won after a mid-ring collision, falling on Rhodes for the three count.

=== Jim Crockett Promotions (1985–1989) ===
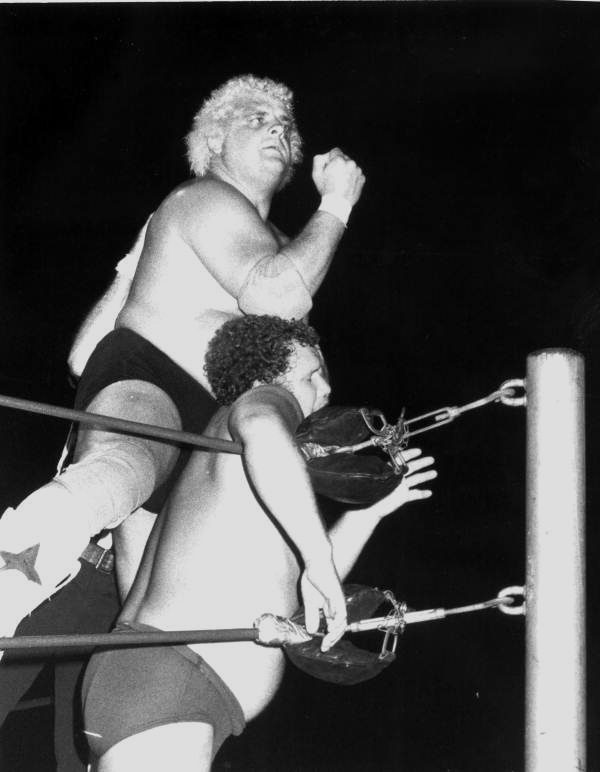
Rhodes battling Harley Race at an NWA event

He eventually began working as a booker and wrestler with Jim Crockett Promotions (JCP) in the Mid-Atlantic, which eventually purchased World Championship Wrestling (WCW), formerly Georgia Championship Wrestling. Rhodes also teamed with Magnum T. A. as "America's Team", who opposed the Four Horsemen and The Russian Team in 1985. They were one of the more dominant tag teams in the promotion until 1986, when Magnum's career was ended in a car accident. Subsequently, he teamed with Nikita Koloff as The Super Powers. Rhodes was also a two time World Six-Man Tag Team Champion with The Road Warriors.

Rhodes had feuds with Abdullah the Butcher, Terry Funk, Kevin Sullivan, Blackjack Mulligan, Nikita Koloff, Harley Race, Superstar Billy Graham, "Crippler" Ray Stevens and, most notably, The Four Horsemen (especially Ric Flair and Tully Blanchard). Rhodes, Flair and Race fought each other many times over the NWA World Heavyweight Championship. Rhodes won the NWA World Heavyweight Championship three times; twice by defeating Race and once by defeating Flair. During a taping which took place at The Omni on September 29, 1985, Rhodes would save Flair from a beatdown at hands of Ivan and Nikitia Koloff and Krusher Krushchev, only for Flair to then turn on Rhodes and have Ole and Arn Anderson assist him in breaking Rhodes's ankle; this also forced Rhodes to vacate his NWA Television Championship. In October 1985, during his feud with Flair, Rhodes gave an interview that became known as his "Hard Times" promo, arguably his most popular promo:

First of all, I would like to thank the many, many fans throughout this country that wrote cards and letters to Dusty Rhodes, The American Dream, while I was down. Secondly, I want to thank Jim Crockett Promotions for waitin' and takin' the time 'cause I know how important it was, Starrcade '85 it is to the wrestling fans, it is to Jim Crockett promotions, and Dusty Rhodes The American Dream. With that wait, I got what I wanted, Ric Flair the World's Heavyweight Champion. I don't have to say a whole lot more about the way I feel about Ric Flair; no respect, no honor. There is no honor amongst thieves in the first place.

He put hard times on Dusty Rhodes and his family. You don't know what hard times are, daddy. Hard times are when the textile workers around this country are out of work, they got four or five kids and can't pay their wages, can't buy their food. Hard times are when the auto workers are out of work and they tell 'em to go home. And hard times are when a man has worked at a job for thirty years, thirty years, and they give him a watch, kick him in the butt and say "hey a computer took your place, daddy", that's hard times! That's hard times! And Ric Flair you put hard times on this country by takin' Dusty Rhodes out, that's hard times. And we all had hard times together, and I admit, I don't look like the athlete of the day supposed to look. My belly's just a lil' big, my heiny's a lil' big, but brother, I am bad. And they know I'm bad.

There were two bad people... One was John Wayne and he's dead brother, and the other's right here. Nature Boy Ric Flair, the World's Heavyweight title belongs to these people. I'mma reach out right now, I want you at home to know my hand is touchin' your hand for the gathering of the biggest body of people in this country, in this universe, all over the world now, reachin' out because the love that was given me and this time I will repay you now. Because I will be the next World's Heavyweight Champion of this hard time blues. Dusty Rhodes tour, '85.

And Ric Flair, Nature Boy... Let me leave you with this. One way to hurt Ric Flair, is to take what he cherishes more than anything in the world and that's the World's Heavyweight title. I'm gon' take it, I been there twice. This time when I take it daddy, I'm gon' take it for you. Let's gather for it. Don't let me down now, 'cause I came back for you, for that man up there that died 10–12 years ago and never got the opportunity to see a real World's Champion. And I'm proud of you, thank God I have you, and I love you. Love ya!

The promo apparently resonated with wrestling fans so much that people came to him in arenas in tears to thank him for "honoring their plight". In 2015, an ESPN article referred to "Hard Times" as Rhodes's best interview, writing, "In just over three minutes, Rhodes fully encapsulated every ounce of his charm by endearing himself to blue-collar mid-America".

During his stint as booker, JCP were engulfed in aggressive competition with the World Wrestling Federation (WWF). When the WWF introduced Mike Jones as Ted DiBiase's bodyguard, Bobby Heenan suggested naming the character Virgil as an inside joke on Dusty's real name. Also in the late 1980s, Rhodes became synonymous with what would become known as the "Dusty finish", a trick ending in which a wrestler would win a match while the referee was knocked out, and the decision would be overturned.

Rhodes is often considered to be one of the most innovative and creative bookers in the history of professional wrestling. As previously mentioned, his work in the development of "supercards" and gimmick matches did much to enhance the quality of entertainment and move the industry forward, as evident by other major promotions following with their own major cards and gimmicks. At the same time, however, he and JCP had an "old school" philosophy that did not bode well with the changes that were brought with fast moving media such as cable TV, etc. The long-standing storylines and the frequent use of the aforementioned "Dusty finish", techniques that had worked well during the NWA's territorial days, had now started to leave many fans dissatisfied with the promotion's booking.

Rhodes was fired after Starrcade '88: True Gritt, because of a taboo on-screen bloodletting (laid down by the Turner Broadcasting System following their purchase of the company) during a November 26 altercation with The Road Warriors. Furious with the interference, Rhodes booked a storyline in which Road Warrior Animal pulled a spike out of his shoulder pad and jammed it in Rhodes's eye, causing a severe laceration. Rhodes was then fired from WCW.

=== Professional Wrestling Federation (1989) ===
Meanwhile, in late 1988 during the acquisition of Jim Crockett Promotions the duo of Mike Graham and Steve Keirn were attempting to revive the dormant CWF Championship Wrestling from Florida territory. Once Dusty departed from WCW they reached out to him, and ultimately partnered to launch the new Professional Wrestling Federation in February 1989. Rhodes had larger visions for the fledgling regional territory, which included a name change from FCW to the non-regional PWF. The new startup promotion featured a raft of current and future stars, including Terry Funk, Dick Slater, Bam Bam Bigelow, Al Perez, The Nasty Boys, Scott Hall, Dustin Rhodes, Mike Awesome, Dallas Page and The Big Steel Man (Fred Ottman, who would become Tugboat in the WWF).

Dusty Rhodes made his debut for the company on March 4, 1989, at an event in Titusville, Florida, when he teamed with Steve Keirn to defeat the duo of The Big Steel Man and Dick Slater. A week later at the PWF Homecoming event in Tampa, Florida, he pinned Big Steel Man to become the first PWF Heavyweight Champion. Later that spring as the PWF began to grow Rhodes received a surprise backstage visit from Bobby Heenan, who inquired on the state of the company's business. Shortly thereafter Vince McMahon reached out to Rhodes and made an offer to acquire the PWF as a developmental territory and to bring Rhodes into the WWF. He refused, as his desire was to grow the territory into a national brand that could compete with WCW and the WWF. However the Professional Wrestling Federation's backers did not have a desire to fund the company at a level necessary to enhance the territory further. In May he decided to part ways with the PWF and join the World Wrestling Federation as a wrestler.

Before departing, Rhodes was defeated by The Big Steel Man on May 13, 1989, for the PWF title at an event in Sarasota, Florida. His final match with the company was on May 20, where he wrestled Steel Man at an event in Fort Lauderdale.

During the spring Rhodes also returned to the AWA for a few appearances.

=== World Wrestling Federation (1989–1991) ===
Nine days after his final PWF match, Dusty Rhodes made his untelevised debut at a house show on May 29 in Montreal, Quebec. Substituting for Jake Roberts, he defeated Ted DiBiase. Promotional vignettes began airing, the first coming on the June 3rd edition of WWF Superstars of Wrestling with Rhodes appearing as the yellow polka-dotted "Common Man" Dusty Rhodes, a gimmick some felt was intended to humiliate him due to his synonymy with the rival JCP/WCW. Rhodes was introduced to WWF audiences through a series of vignettes in which he would gregariously and enthusiastically perform working class roles (including that of a plumber, butcher's apprentice, gas station attendant, taco cook, trash collector and pizza delivery man), eventually being recognized by others at the end of the skit ("Hey! Aren't you...?").

Rhodes continued to wrestle DiBiase on house shows that month and was undefeated. He was pinned however on June 6 in a dark match against DiBiase at a WWF Superstars taping in Madison, Wisconsin. Many years later, this match was included as part of the WWE Unreleased: 1986–1995 DVD set. It was said that Rhodes was asked to lose in this match to test his willingness to put over other talent. Aside from this defeat, "The American Dream" remained undefeated against the upper-level heel. Rhodes made his televised appearance on the July 22 edition of WWF Superstars; following a match between Big Boss Man and Jim McPherson he intervened to prevent Boss Man from using his nightstick against the defeated opponent. This transitioned Dusty into his first World Wrestling Federation feud.

Rhodes made his in-ring debut on the August 13th edition of Wrestling Challenge when he pinned Greg Valentine after his opponent was distracted by Ronnie Garvin. That month he began his house show series against Big Boss Man and was dominant, defeating the rulebreaker in every encounter. Rhodes scored his first televised win against Boss Man on the August 21 edition of Prime Time Wrestling. At SummerSlam 1989, he appeared on his first-ever WWF PPV, defeating The Honky Tonk Man. Meanwhile, on the road his dominance continued as he remained undefeated against the Boss Man.

In October a Rhodes fan, Sapphire, began to be featured at ringside during his televised matches. Rhodes would eventually invite the woman to come in the ring and dance with her after a victory. She would become his manager and was named "Sapphire". As Dusty represented "The Common Man", she was intended to represent the "common woman". On November 23, 1989, at The Survivor Series he led a quartet dubbed The Dream Team composed of Brutus Beefcake, Tito Santana, and The Red Rooster to victory against The Enforcers (Big Boss Man, The Honky Tonk Man, Rick Martel, and Akeem). Rhodes would finish the year dispatching Boss Man in house show matches around the country, sometimes in "ball and chain" encounters.

Having finished the year with just one untelevised loss, Dusty entered 1990 as a dominant force within the World Wrestling Federation. He competed in the 1990 Royal Rumble and eliminated Bret Hart before in turn being thrown over the top rope by Earthquake. After dispatching the Boss Man, he next became embroiled in a heated storyline with "Macho King" Randy Savage and his manager/partner Sensational Queen Sherri, who in turn found a rival in Sapphire. Rhodes began facing the former WWF World Champion on the house show circuit. As with Boss Man he was victorious in every encounter, although each would come by countout. On the March 25, 1990 episode of WWF Superstars he finally faced Savage in a televised encounter; Rhodes won via disqualification after Queen Sherri interfered. After a confrontation between the two couples, Savage's ex-manager Miss Elizabeth allied herself with Rhodes and Sapphire and was instrumental in helping them win the WWF's first mixed tag-team match during WrestleMania VI.

Rhodes suffered a foot injury a few weeks later, leading to his temporary removal from the house show circuit and replaced by Roddy Piper. He returned on May 12 and resumed his house show series against Savage. This time his dominance was more profound as he started to defeat The Macho Man by pinfall around the country. This continued until June 3, 1990, when Dusty's lengthy undefeated streak was finally ended by Savage in West Palm Beach, Florida. Rhodes began teaming with Sapphire to face Savage and Sherri on house shows, resuming his winning streak and remaining undefeated. Later that summer Sapphire began to receive gifts from an unnamed benefactor during Dusty's televised matches. At SummerSlam 1990, Sapphire no-showed her scheduled match with Queen Sherri. Later that night Dusty was scheduled to face Randy Savage in a one-on-one encounter; prior to the match Ted DiBiase announced that Sapphire had left Rhodes for The Million Dollar Man's money. Distracted and distraught, Rhodes was pinned by Savage.

Dusty immediately transitioned to a feud with The Million Dollar Man. Unlike his previous series with Boss Man and Savage, this time Rhodes would come out on the losing end. He lost numerous house show matches after Virgil interfered on the behalf of DiBiase. That fall his son Dustin Rhodes began making televised appearances within the WWF; on the October 13 edition of WWF Superstars Dusty lost to Randy Savage by countout after being distracted by DiBiase attacking Dustin. Afterwards, Rhodes dropped the polka dot attire and adopted his traditional, Jim Crockett-esque attire. At the 1990 Survivor Series he led "The Dream Team" (himself, Bret Hart, Jim Neidhart, and Koko B. Ware) against "The Million Dollar Team". Unlike last year's edition, the results were far different. DiBiase was teaming with Rhythm & Blues and a mystery partner, the latter who turned out to be the newly arrived Undertaker. The future Hall of Famer would dispatch Ware and later pin Rhodes, with Ted DiBiase ultimately remaining as the sole survivor.

Around this time in the fall Dusty Rhodes received an offer to return to World Championship Wrestling as its head booker. He now began to lose regularly, falling again in defeat to Ted DiBiase in house shows during December 1990 but also losing to Rick Martel, Virgil, and new top heel Sgt. Slaughter. Some of the losses were under 1 minute as the WWF leveraged Rhodes departure. On December 28, 1990, he teamed with Jim Duggan to face Slaughter and General Adnan at Madison Square Garden. The match, which would be televised on Prime Time Wrestling on January 7, 1991, ended when Rhodes submitted to Slaughter. The conclusion to the feud with DiBiase came at 1991 Royal Rumble, where Dusty teamed with his son Dustin against Virgil and DiBiase. The Rhodes Family was defeated in a match that saw Virgil turn face afterwards. This would mark the end of Dusty Rhodes's career as a full-time in-ring competitor.

=== World Championship Wrestling (1991–1999) ===
Rhodes returned to WCW in 1991 as a member of WCW's booking committee. During his tenure, booking disagreements between Rhodes and Ric Flair led to the latter's departure to the WWF and the Big Gold Belt controversy.

Rhodes made his first televised appearance with WCW only 11 days after his last WWF appearance at the Royal Rumble. On the May 25 edition of World Championship Wrestling, he launched an interview segment called "The Bull Drop Inn".

From summer 1991 to 1992, Rhodes served as the on-screen manager of Ron Simmons. In a match that was advertised on World Championship Wrestling, on October 12, 1991, Dusty served as the special guest referee in a match at the Omni in Atlanta, Georgia, that saw Simmons and Barry Windham team up to defeat Mr. Hughes and Lex Luger. On the October 19 edition of World Championship Wrestling, Rhodes was announced as being in the corner of Ron Simmons when the latter was scheduled to face Lex Luger for the WCW World Heavyweight Championship at Halloween Havoc 1991. Rhodes would go on to be Simmons' cornerman that night, although Luger retained his championship.

Rhodes made his return to the ring after nearly a one-year absence on January 4, 1992, at the WCW/New Japan Supershow II. Teaming with his son Dustin Rhodes once more, the duo defeated Kim Duk and Masa Saito in Tokyo, Japan. He began making house show appearances early in the year, usually in tag-team matches involving Dustin that saw Paul E. Dangerously tied to Dusty as part of the stipulation. On the May 16, 1992 episode of WCW Worldwide he seconded Nikita Koloff in his match with Big Van Vader; he battled Vader's manager Harley Race to the backstage as the match began. Later that summer Dusty was again in the corner of Ron Simmons, this time on August 2, 1992, when he defeated Big Van Vader to win the WCW World Heavyweight Championship.

Rhodes later joined the WCW broadcast team, usually working with Tony Schiavone on WCW Saturday Night. He was paired with Schiavone and Bobby Heenan on pay-per-views.

On February 25, 1993, Rhodes' son Dustin defeated Paul Orndorff to win the WCW United States Championship, and after the match Dusty came out to the ring to celebrate. That led to a slowly simmering feud with the Assassin, who continually challenged Rhodes. On the June 12, 1993 edition of WCW Saturday Night, the Assassin vowed to track down Dusty's mother if that was what it took to gain a response. On the October 30 edition of WCW Saturday Night, the Assassin (now representing Paul Orndorff) again challenged Rhodes. A week later, Dustin Rhodes announced that his father would be in his corner in his upcoming United States Championship defense against the Assassin's charge Paul Orndorff. Dustin successfully retained against Orndorff at Clash of the Champions XXV; Dusty became involved after the match and attempted to unmask the Assassin.

As 1994 progressed, Rhodes became involved in another angle with his son and the Stud Stable, offering commentary on the May 21, 1994, edition of WCW Saturday Night on Col. Robert Parker's efforts against Dustin. At a television taping on July 25, 1994, in Macon, Georgia, he came to ringside and attacked Parker, before being overwhelmed by the manager and Bunkhouse Buck. After being rescued by Ricky Steamboat and Dustin, he made an appearance in Dustin's corner on the August 6 edition of WCW Saturday Night when his son faced Bunkhouse Buck. After delivering a bionic elbow to Buck when the referee was distracted, Dustin was able to gain the pinfall. This ultimately led to Dusty's second match since departing the WWF, where he would team with Dustin to defeated Terry Funk and Buckhouse Buck at Clash of the Champions XXVIII. After a vignette that saw Dusty travel to "The Scrap Bar" to recruit the Nasty Boys, he teamed with them and Dustin to defeat Buck, Arn Anderson, Terry Funk, and Rob Parker in a War Games match at Fall Brawl '94: War Games. He returned to the ring for three more house show matches that fall, teaming with Dustin to defeat the Stud Stable. His last in-ring match for World Championship Wrestling in this run came on November 24, 1994, in Albany, Georgia, where Dusty and Dustin Rhodes defeated Arn Anderson and Bunkhouse Buck in a steel cage.

Through 1995, Rhodes was exclusively on commentary for WCW and did not participate in any in-ring angles. Rhodes was originally on the side of WCW when its battle with the New World Order (nWo) began in 1996. At Souled Out 1998, Larry Zbyszko asked Rhodes, who was working the PPV broadcast, to accompany him to the ring for his match against Scott Hall. Zbyszko won the match by disqualification due to interference by Louie Spicolli. Rhodes entered the ring, delivering his trademark elbow smashes to Spicolli as Zbyszko stood and grabbed Hall. Rhodes went to elbow Hall, but seemingly inadvertently hit Zbyszko instead turning heel in the process. Hall then pointed to Rhodes as he revealed an nWo shirt. The three began to drop repeated elbows on Zbyszko before Rhodes announced, "That's tradition, WCW! Bite this!". Announcer Tony Schiavone left the broadcast booth in shock, but later returned, ripping Rhodes for his actions for most of the rest of the night. As a member of the nWo, Rhodes served as the manager of The Outsiders, Hall and Kevin Nash. This lasted until the November 30, 1998, episode of Monday Nitro, when Rhodes, who was guest refereeing a match between Barry Windham and Dean Malenko after being appointed by Eric Bischoff, defected back to WCW by disqualifying Windham and awarding the match to Malenko. Bischoff then fired Rhodes. On the December 28, 1998, edition of Monday Nitro, Ric Flair faced Eric Bischoff for control of the company for 30 days. After Flair submitted Bischoff, Dusty was amongst those who came out to the ring to celebrate with Flair.

Rhodes left WCW in late 1999.

=== Extreme Championship Wrestling (2000) ===
In 2000, Rhodes joined Extreme Championship Wrestling (ECW). He debuted at the Guilty As Charged PPV on January 8, 2000, where he was attacked by former ECW World Heavyweight Champion, "King of Old School" Steve Corino. On January 28, 2000, he wrestled his first match in over five years, teaming with Tommy Dreamer to defeat Corino and Raven at a ECW on TNN episode that was taped in Fort Lauderdale, Florida. On March 12, 2000, Dusty pinned Steve Corino in a singles match at the Living Dangerously PPV in Danbury, Connecticut. He continued to remain undefeated until he put over Corino at the CyberSlam event on April 22 at the ECW Arena. His final appearance came at an ECW TV taping in Toledo, Ohio, where he accompanied The Sandman to ringside in his match against Rhino, who was seconded by Steve Corino.

=== World Championship Wrestling (2001) ===
Rhodes made his final return to WCW in January 2001, where he reignited the feud once more with long-time nemesis Ric Flair. At the WCW Greed PPV on March 18, 2001, he entered a WCW ring for the final time, teaming with Dustin Rhodes to defeat Ric Flair and Jeff Jarrett. Following the purchase of WCW, the World Wrestling Federation allowed Turner South to continue to air classic matches on its "WCW Classics Program". Much like Heenan and Monsoon, Dusty Rhodes and Ric Flair hosted the program. The duo would bicker throughout the show, which lasted throughout the summer of 2001 and represented the last "original" programming of the old WCW.

=== Turnbuckle Championship Wrestling and other promotions (2000–2003) ===
After both WCW and ECW were bought by WWE (WWF), Rhodes went to compete in his own promotion, Turnbuckle Championship Wrestling with ex-WCW and ECW superstars in Georgia, Florida and Tennessee.

During this time he feuded with Terry Funk and Steve Corino in other territories.

In 2002, Rhodes competed in Pro Pain Pro Wrestling based in Philadelphia feuding with Kevin Sullivan. This would lead to a Texas Bullrope match on November 23 in which Rhodes defeated Sullivan.

=== Total Nonstop Action Wrestling (2003–2005) ===
Rhodes began appearing with Total Nonstop Action Wrestling (TNA) in 2003, returning to the ring to feud against the villainous Sports Entertainment Xtreme faction. on the January 15 NWA-TNA PPV, Rhodes, Road Warriors and Jeff Jarrett lost to Vince Russo and Triple X. on the January 22 NWA-TNA PPV, Rhodes called out Nikita Koloff to reform the Superpowers, but Nikita turned on him. On the February 26 NWA-TNA PPV, Rhodes and Vader defeated Don and Ron Harris by disqualification. On the March 19 NWA-TNA PPV, Rhodes, Jeff Jarrett and D-Lo Brown defeated Erik Watts, Brian Lawler and David Flair in a six-man tag team match a week later Rhodes defeated David Flair in a Bunkhouse match. On the April 9 NWA-TNA PPV, Rhodes defeated Brian Lawler in a Ladder match. On the August 13 NWATNA PPV, Rhodes and America's Most Wanted defeated Glenn Gilbertti and Simon Diamond and Johnny Swinger the following week Rhodes lost a bullrope match to Glen Gilbertti after Christopher Daniels interfered. On the October 1 NWA-TNA PPV, Rhodes and Jarrett defeated A.J. Styles and Russo. The following week Rhodes got a shot at the NWA title against Styles but lost when he passed out during the figure-4. On the October 15 NWA-TNA PPV, Rhodes and America's Most Wanted defeated Legend, Sonny Siaki and Ekmo Fatu. On the November 26 NWA-TNA PPV, Rhodes and Jarrett wrestled to a no contest in a Lumberjack Fan Strap match. After taking a few months off Rhodes returned on May 19, 2004, where he and James Storm defeated Dallas and Kid Kash in a "Bunkhouse Brawl" this led to the duo getting a shot at the NWA World Tag Team Championship on June 2 but they failed to win the titles. On the June 4 episode of Impact, Rhodes gave an interview with Mike Tenay but got punked out by NWA champ Jeff Jarrett. On the July 14 NWA-TNA PPV, Rhodes, Larry Zbyszko and 3Live Kru defeated Jarrett, Ken Shamrock, Hernandez, Chad Collyer and Onyx. On the August 25 NWATNA PPV, Russo suspended Rhodes from TNA and banned him from the Asylum a few days later on the August 27 episode of Impact, Rhodes showed up in the front row, and got attacked by Scott D'Amore and ejected again. On the September 1 NWA-TNA PPV, Rhodes under a mask billed as Midnight Rider teamed with Konnan and B.G. James to defeat Team Canada (Eric Young and Bobby Roode and Johnny Devine). On the September 8 NWA-TNA PPV, Rhodes defeated Scott D'Amore with Russo as the special guest referee. On the October 29 episode of Impact, Rhodes started his campaign to replace Vince Russo as the Director of Authority. Later, he became the Director of Authority at their November 7, 2004 pay-per-view, Victory Road. At the same time, Rhodes acted as head booker and writer. On the April 8, 2005, episode of Impact, Rhodes made the on-air decision to make all matches at Lockdown PPV in Six Sides of Steel. Then on the April 29 episode of Impact, Rhodes announced that MMA fighter Tito Ortiz will referee the World title match at Hard Justice (2005). In May 2005, TNA President Dixie Carter asked Rhodes to move onto a creative team, which included Jeremy Borash, Bill Banks, and Scott D'Amore. Rhodes resigned as booker, waiting out the rest of his contract with TNA, which expired soon after.

=== Independent circuit (2003–2006) ===
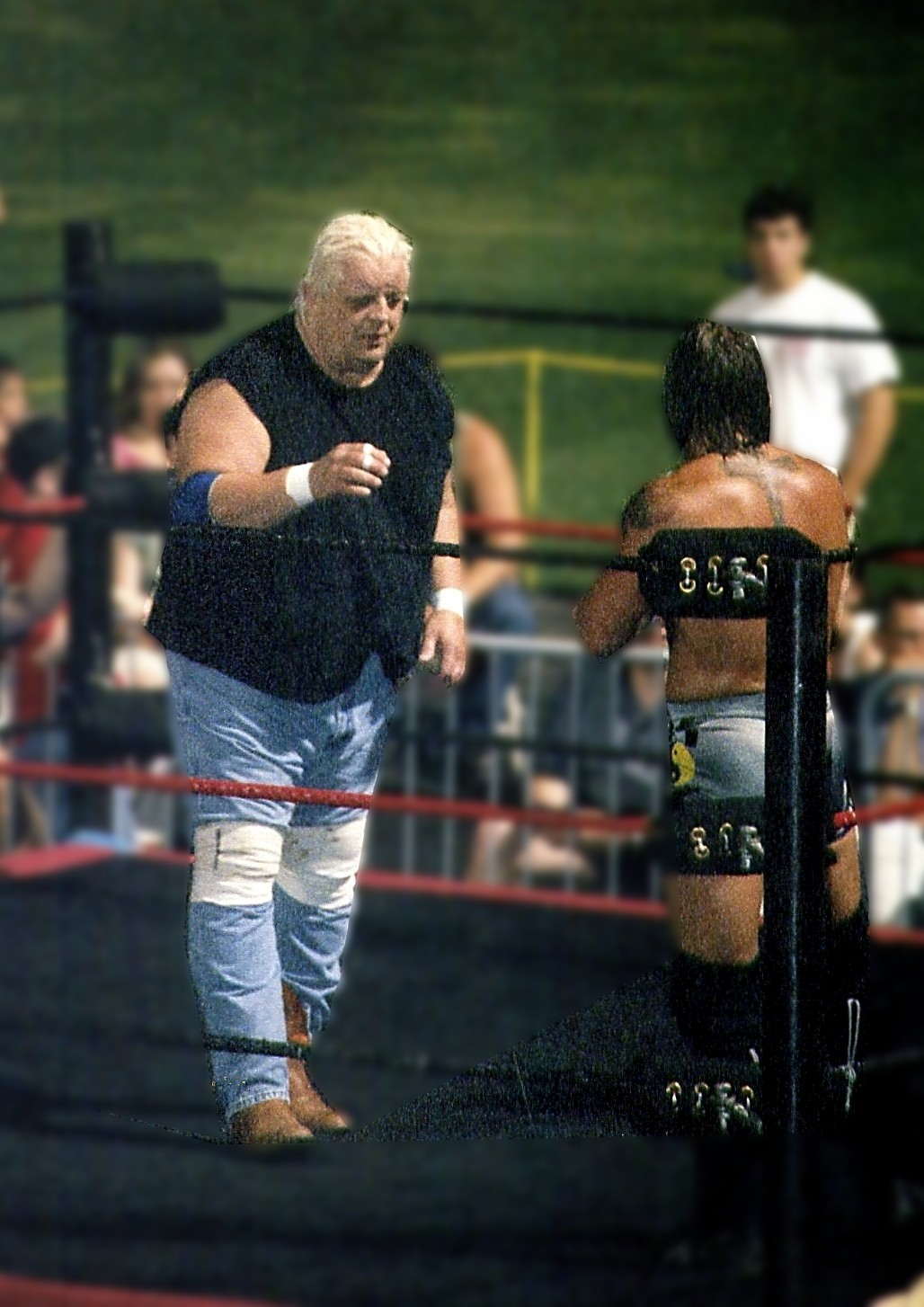
Rhodes facing Kid Kash in Ballpark Brawl

Rhodes made his first indie circuit appearance on April 12, 2003, for Ring of Honor (ROH), when he participated in the "I Quit Bunkhouse Riot" as a member of Homicide's team. On December 12, Rhodes defeated Jerry Lawler at an International Wrestling Cartel show that also featured Mick Foley as the special guest referee. Rhodes returned to ROH on March 13, 2004, where he competed alongside The Carnage Crew in a Scramble Cage match against Special K, which the Carnage Crew won.

On July 24, Rhodes returned to Full Impact Pro (FIP) and defeated Gangrel. In October, he appeared for Northeast Wrestling in a victory over Kamala. Later in the month, he appeared for IWA Mid-South in a tag team match with Ian Rotten in a victory over Chris Candido and Steve Stone. Rhodes made three appearances for the Japanese promotion HUSTLE in 2004, the first being on January 4 in a six-man tag team match with Steve Corino and Tom Howard against Mil Mascaras, Dos Caras, and Sicodelico Jr., which Rhodes's team lost. The second was on March 7, where he teamed with his son Dustin against Shinjiro Otani and Satoshi Kojima, which he also lost. The third was on May 8, where he defeated Corino.

Starting in December 2004, Rhodes made regular appearances for Carolina Championship Wrestling (CCW), where his first match for the promotion saw him team up with The Rock 'n' Roll Express to take on Dennis Condrey, Bobby Eaton, and Stan Lane, all three of the best-known members of the Midnight Express. He also briefly resurrected his feud with Tully Blanchard in CCW, earning two consecutive victories over him, the second being in a Bunkhouse Brawl. On April 9, 2005, Rhodes challenged Jeff Jarrett (who was still contracted to TNA, but due to TNA's then-affiliation with the NWA, he was allowed to appear for other affiliated promotions) for the NWA World Heavyweight Championship. In a match that featured Jimmy Valiant as the special guest referee, Jarrett retained the title after Terry Funk made a surprise appearance and interfered. This led to Rhodes challenging Funk to a Falls-Count-Anywhere Bunkhouse match, which Rhodes won. This would be Rhodes's final appearance with CCW until August, where he would team with his son Dustin against Phi Delta Slam.

On July 15, 2005, Rhodes participated in Ballpark Brawl IV in a victory over Kid Kash. Rhodes participated in the first WrestleReunion, competing in an eight-man tag team match with D'Lo Brown, The Blue Meanie, and Tom Prichard against Steve Corino, Andrew Martin, Evil Clown, and the Masked Superstar. Rhodes faced Tully Blanchard at a Starrcade Tribute Show on November 19, where he was managed by Magnum T. A. and where Blanchard was managed by J. J. Dillon. Rhodes ended up losing the match.

On December 3, 2005, Rhodes returned to Carolina Championship Wrestling for one night only to face Terry Funk in an "I Quit" match, which Rhodes won. Rhodes made his final major appearances on the independent circuit before returning full-time to WWE in mid-2006, defeating Jerry Lawler by disqualification at a Southern Championship Wrestling (SCW) show and also earning a victory over Steve Corino in a Texas Bullrope match for Big Time Wrestling.

=== Return to WWE (2005–2015) ===
==== Final matches and retirement (2005–2010) ====
In September 2005, Rhodes signed a WWE Legends deal and was brought onto the Creative Team as a creative consultant. He made an appearance on the October 3, 2005 WWE Raw Homecoming in which he, along with other legends, beat down Rob Conway, to whom Rhodes delivered a signature Bionic Elbow.

Rhodes made an appearance on the June 19, 2006, episode of Raw, appearing in a backstage segment with Vince McMahon where he promoted his new DVD, The American Dream – The Dusty Rhodes Story. A few weeks before Survivor Series, Rhodes returned to WWE to be a part of Team WWE Legends, led by Flair. The team, which consisted of Sgt. Slaughter, Ron Simmons, and Arn Anderson (acting as manager) competed against The Spirit Squad at Survivor Series.

Rhodes was inducted into the WWE Hall of Fame on March 31, 2007, by his two sons, Dustin and Cody. During his acceptance speech, Rhodes asked Ric Flair and Arn Anderson to hold up the "sign" and induct him and Harley Race into the Four Horsemen. He has also inducted several other people into the Hall of Fame, including his mentor Eddie Graham in 2008, The Funk Brothers (Terry and Dory Funk Jr.) in 2009, The Road Warriors in 2011, and longtime rivals The Four Horsemen in 2012.

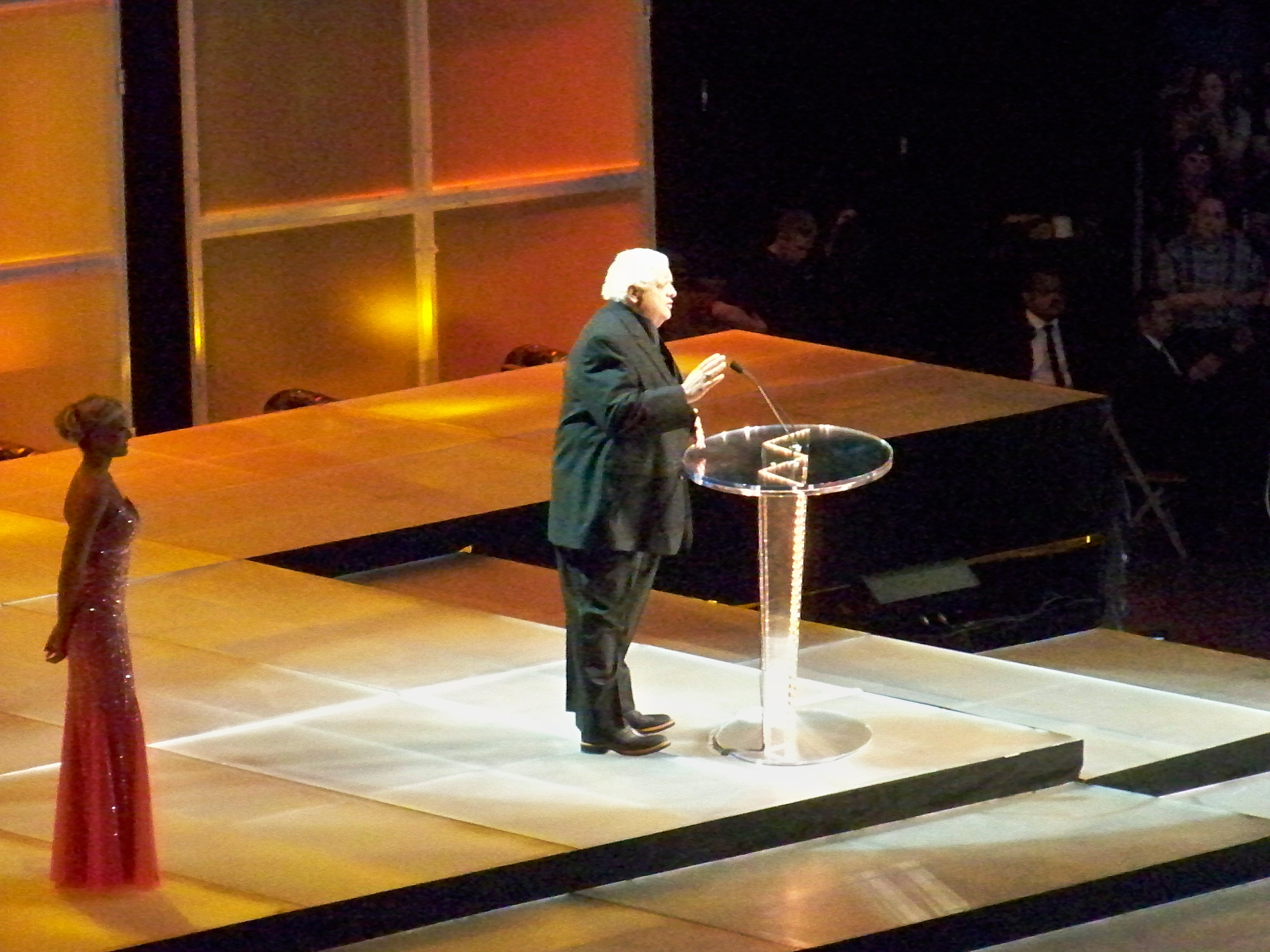
Rhodes at the 2009 WWE Hall of Fame ceremony, inducting the Funk Brothers

A few weeks before WWE's 2007 broadcast of The Great American Bash, Rhodes returned to WWE television to feud with Randy Orton. At The Great American Bash, Orton defeated Rhodes in a Texas Bullrope match after hitting Rhodes with a cowbell. This would be Runnels' final WWE match, officially retiring for the first time soon after at age 61. The following night on Raw, after Orton defeated Rhodes's son Cody, Orton delivered a kick to Rhodes's head while he was trying to tend to his son. On the December 10 episode of Raw, Rhodes was at ringside to see Cody and Hardcore Holly defeat Lance Cade and Trevor Murdoch for the World Tag Team Championship.

On August 31, 2009, during the time Cody was part of The Legacy with Randy Orton and Ted DiBiase, Rhodes was the special guest host of Raw and booked a match between Cody and Orton for Orton's WWE Championship with John Cena as the special guest referee. It quickly turned out to be a ruse with Dusty's intention to allow Legacy to attack Cena, as well as D-Generation X (Triple H and Shawn Michaels) once they came to make the save. Despite the four standing tall together, Orton quickly gave an RKO to Rhodes, and though initially angered, Cody fell in line behind Orton.

On July 9, 2010, Rhodes briefly came out of retirement and wrestled the final match of his career at an FCW live event, where he teamed up with Cody and Goldust to defeat the team of Caylen Croft, Curt Hawkins, and Trent Barreta in a 6-man tag team match. He would again retire shortly after.

==== Sporadic appearances (2010–2015) ====
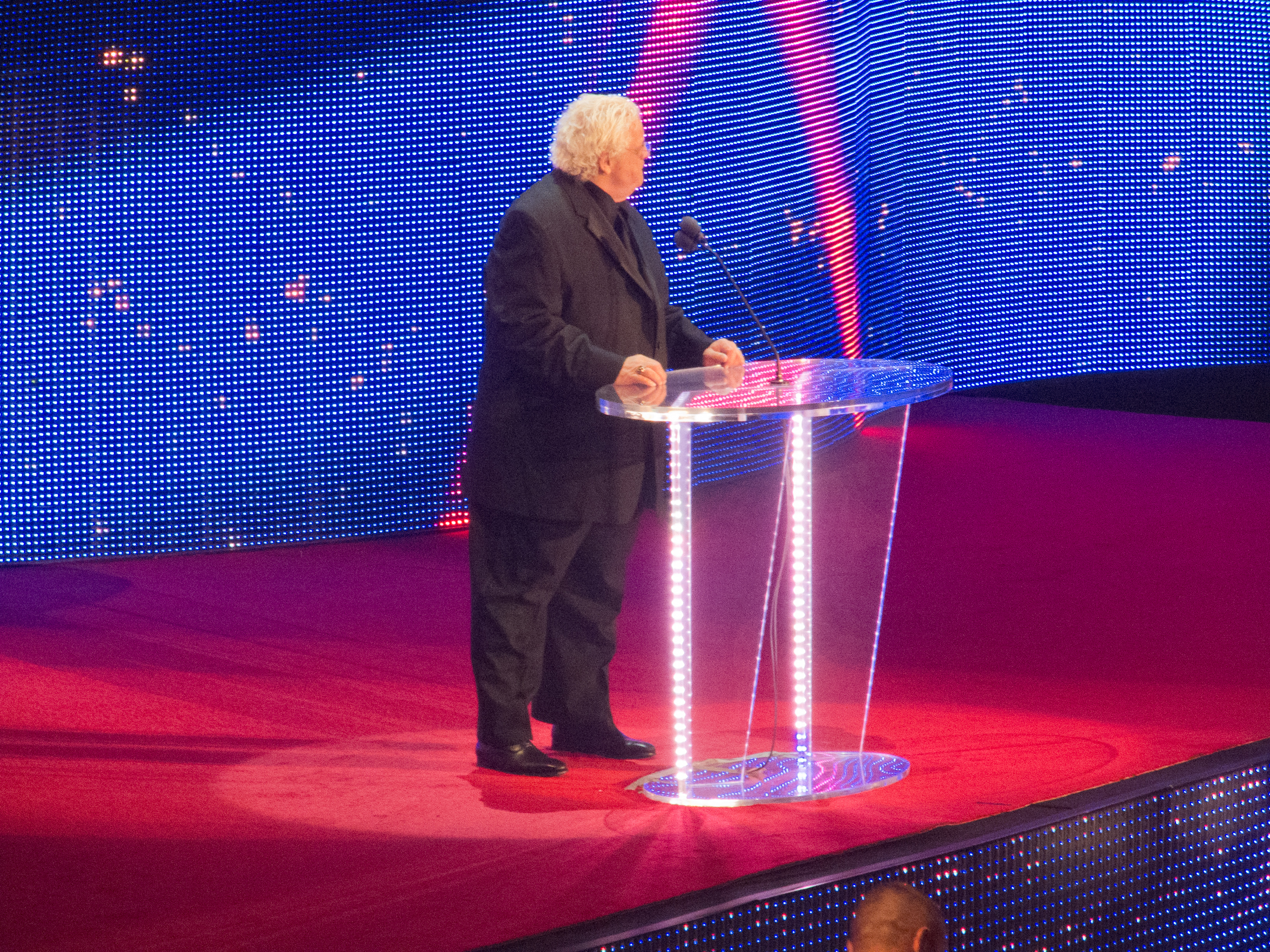
Rhodes at the 2012 WWE Hall of Fame ceremony, inducting the Four Horsemen

Rhodes was the head writer and creative director for the weekly NXT Wrestling television broadcast. On September 12, 2013, he was removed as NXT Commissioner. Rhodes made his return to Raw on September 16, 2013, after accepting a "business proposition" from Stephanie McMahon in an attempt for WWE to rehire both his sons Cody and Dustin. After learning that McMahon would only rehire one son of his choosing, Rhodes turned down the offer and was subsequently knocked out by Big Show on the orders of McMahon. Rhodes also appeared at Battleground in the corner of Cody and Goldust as they took on The Shield (Seth Rollins and Roman Reigns with Dean Ambrose at ringside) in a tag team match. The stipulation of the match would be that if the Rhodes Family won, Cody and Goldust got their jobs with the company back, but if they lose Dusty would be fired as an NXT trainer and none of them could appear on WWE programming ever again. The Rhodes brothers won the match, thus reinstating them to the roster and allowing Dusty to retain his position in NXT. During the match, Dusty got into an altercation with Ambrose and performed the Bionic Elbow on him.

Rhodes appeared on the February 16, 2015, episode of Raw, in an effort to reunite Goldust and Stardust, who were engaged in a conflict. Rhodes appeared at Fastlane on February 22, in a backstage segment with Goldust. Rhodes's final appearance on WWE programming would be on March 28, when he appeared on the Hall of Fame: Live From the Red Carpet show.

== Personal life ==
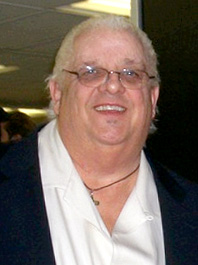
Rhodes c. 2008

Runnels was married to Sandra McHargue from 1965 to 1975, with whom he shared two children: Dustin, and Kristin Runnels, a Dallas Cowboys cheerleader. In 1978, he married Michelle Rubio, with whom he had two children: Teil Runnels and Cody Runnels. The couple were married for 37 years until his death in 2015. He had seven grandchildren: Dakota, the daughter of Dustin and his ex-wife, Terri Boatright; Dalton and Dylan, children of Kristin and her husband Don Ditto; Kellan and Maris, children of Teil and her husband Kevin Gergel; and Liberty and Leilani, daughters of Cody and his wife Brandi. He also had a brother, Larry, and a sister, Connie. He played baseball and football for Sul Ross State University in Alpine, Texas before transferring to West Texas State University.

== Illness and death ==
In his later years, Rhodes suffered from kidney disease.

On June 10, 2015, paramedics responded to Rhodes's home in Orlando, Florida, after getting a call reporting that he had fallen. They drove him to a nearby hospital, where he died the next day at the age of 69 from the effects of kidney failure. Rhodes was cremated, and his ashes were spread in November 2015 by his son Dustin on a ranch that Rhodes loved to visit.

At the 2015 Money in the Bank pay-per-view event, a ten-bell salute was given in honor of Rhodes, with the entire WWE roster and the McMahon family on the entrance ramp. The next night on Raw, they honored him with a video tribute and a special after Raw on the WWE Network. At the NXT tapings following his death, he was honored with another ten-bell salute.

== Legacy ==
Rhodes has been called one of the best wrestlers in Dusty Rhodes' "Hard Times" promo has been labeled as one of the best interviews in pro wrestling. According to Jim Cornette, his NWA World title reigns were of short length since he was not what NWA was looking for in a champion, but not winning the title would hurt his credibility.

Since Rhodes worked as a backstage producer in WCW, he helped several wrestlers with their careers. Diamond Dallas Page, who has in turn helped Rhodes's son Cody with his career, and Missy Hyatt in particular have praised Rhodes's influence on their respective careers. During his late years, Rhodes became a trainer in WWE's development territory NXT, where several wrestlers like Kevin Owens, Becky Lynch, and the tag team FTR, praised his lessons.

In August 2015, WWE's NXT introduced the Dusty Rhodes Tag Team Classic, a tag team tournament in honor of Rhodes. The tournament has been held annually since, with a women's version added in 2021.

All Elite Wrestling named their "Go Position" (best known as the Gorilla Position), "The Dusty Position", after him on October 16, 2019.

In the promo room of the WWE Performance Center, where Rhodes would teach promo classes, there is a puppet of Rhodes hanging on the equipment, symbolizing that he is still there, watching the students.

== Championships and accomplishments ==
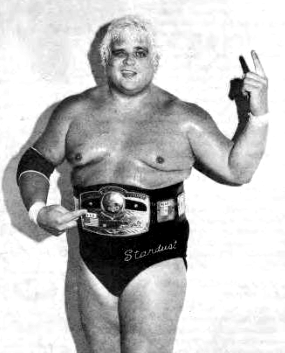
Rhodes was a three-time NWA World Heavyweight Champion.

- 50th State Big Time Wrestling
  - NWA North American Heavyweight Championship (Hawaii version) (1 time)
- Big Time Wrestling
  - NWA World Tag Team Championship (Detroit Version) (1 time) – with Dick Murdoch
- Central States Wrestling
  - NWA Central States Heavyweight Championship (2 times)
  - NWA North American Tag Team Championship (Central States version) (1 time) – with Dick Murdoch
- Championship Wrestling from Florida
  - NWA Brass Knuckles Championship (Florida version) (2 times)
  - NWA Florida Bahamian Championship (1 time)
  - NWA Florida Global Tag Team Championship (1 time) – with Magnum T. A.
  - NWA Florida Heavyweight Championship (12 times)
  - NWA Florida Tag Team Championship (4 times) – with Dick Murdoch (1), Dick Slater (1), Bobo Brazil (1), and André the Giant (1)
  - NWA Florida Television Championship (2 times)
  - NWA Southern Heavyweight Championship (Florida version) (10 times)
  - NWA United States Tag Team Championship (Florida version) (2 times) – with Bugsy McGraw (1) and Blackjack Mulligan (1)
  - NWA World Heavyweight Championship (1 time)
  - NWA Florida Heavyweight Championship Tournament (1978)
  - NWA United States Tag Team Championship Tournament (1980) – with Bugsy McGraw
- George Tragos/Lou Thesz Professional Wrestling Hall of Fame
  - Class of 2017
- Georgia Championship Wrestling
  - NWA Georgia Heavyweight Championship (1 time)
  - NWA World Heavyweight Championship (1 time)
  - Cadillac Cup (1984)
- International Wrestling Alliance (Australia)
  - IWA World Tag Team Championship (1 time) – with Dick Murdoch
- International Professional Wrestling Hall of Fame
  - Class of 2024
- Mid-Atlantic Championship Wrestling/Jim Crockett Promotions/World Championship Wrestling
  - NWA National Heavyweight Championship (1 time)
  - NWA United States Heayvweight Championship (1 time)
  - NWA World Heavyweight Championship (1 time)
  - NWA World Six-Man Tag Team Championship (2 times) – with The Road Warriors
  - NWA World Tag Team Championship (Mid-Atlantic version) (2 times) – with Dick Slater (1) and Manny Fernandez (1)
  - NWA World Television Championship (3 times)
  - Jim Crockett, Sr. Memorial Cup Tag Team Tournament (1987) – with Nikita Koloff
  - Bunkhouse Stampede (1985–1988)
  - WCW Hall of Fame (Class of 1995)
- Mid-Atlantic Championship Wrestling (Revival)
  - NWA Mid-Atlantic Tag Team Championship (1 time) – with Buff Bagwell
- Pro Wrestling Federation (Florida)
  - PWF World Heavyweight Championship (1 time)
- National Wrestling Alliance
  - NWA Hall of Fame (Class of 2011)
  - NWA Legends Hall of Heroes (Class of 2016)
- NWA Big Time Wrestling
  - NWA American Tag Team Championship (2 times) – with Baron von Raschke (1) and Dick Murdoch (1)
  - NWA Brass Knuckles Championship (Texas version) (3 times)
- NWA San Francisco
  - NWA United States Heavyweight Championship (San Francisco version) (1 time)
- NWA Tri-State
  - NWA North American Heavyweight Championship (Tri-State version) (1 time)
  - NWA United States Tag Team Championship (Tri-State version) (2 times) – with André the Giant and The Spoiler
- National Wrestling Federation
  - NWF World Tag Team Championship (1 time) – with Dick Murdoch
- New Japan Pro-Wrestling
  - Greatest 18 Club inductee
- Pro Wrestling Illustrated
  - Feud of the Year (1987) with Nikita Koloff and The Road Warriors vs. Four Horsemen
  - Match of the Year (1979) vs. Harley Race on August 21
  - Match of the Year (1986) vs. Ric Flair in a cage match at The Great American Bash
  - Most Popular Wrestler of the Year (1978, 1979, 1987)
  - Stanley Weston Award (2013)
  - Wrestler of the Year (1977, 1978)
  - Ranked No. 193 of the top 500 wrestlers in the PWI 500 in 2001
  - Ranked No. 11 of the top 500 wrestlers of "PWI Years" in 2003
  - Ranked No. 76 and No. 88 of the top 100 tag teams of the "PWI Years" with Magnum T. A. and Manny Fernandez, respectively, in 2003
- Professional Wrestling Hall of Fame and Museum
  - Class of 2010
- World Championship Wrestling (Australia)
  - IWA World Tag Team Championship (1 time) – with Dick Murdoch
- World Wrestling Entertainment/WWE
  - WWE Hall of Fame (Class of 2007)
  - Slammy Award (1 time)
    - "Say What" Quote of the Year (2013) – "One stipulation: I'm in my boys' corner and I'll be your huckleberry all night long".
  - WWE Bronze Statue (2016)
- Wrestling Observer Newsletter
  - Best Babyface (1980)
  - Best Booker (1986)
  - Most Charismatic (1982) tied with Ric Flair
  - Most Embarrassing Wrestler (1990)
  - Most Overrated (1987, 1988)
  - Most Obnoxious (1988, 1989)
  - Readers' Least Favorite Wrestler (1987, 1988)
  - Worst Feud of the Year (1988) vs. Tully Blanchard
  - Worst Gimmick (1988)
  - Worst Television Announcer (1997)
  - Wrestling Observer Newsletter Hall of Fame (Class of 1996)

^{1}This Mid-Atlantic Championship Wrestling, while currently operating out of the same region of the United States and having revised some of the championships used by the original Mid-Atlantic Championship Wrestling, is not the same promotion that was once owned by Jim Crockett Jr. and subsequently sold to Ted Turner in 1988. It is just another NWA-affiliated promotion.

== Media ==
- Books
  - Autobiography: Dusty: Reflections of an American Dream (2005) ISBN 978-1-58261-907-1
- DVDs
  - The American Dream: The Dusty Rhodes Story (2006) WWE Home Video
- Movies
  - Scooby-Doo! and WWE: Curse of the Speed Demon (2016)
  - Paradise Park (1992)
- Video games
  - Runnels has appeared in the video games ECW Anarchy Rulz, Showdown: Legends of Wrestling, WWE SmackDown vs. Raw 2007, WWE Legends of WrestleMania, WWE SmackDown vs. Raw 2010, WWE 2K17, WWE 2K18 and WWE 2K20 as a non-DLC character, and had also appeared in WWE 2K14, WWE 2K16, WWE 2K19, WWE 2K24 as DLC (Downloadable Content) and WWE 2K25
