= List of former Jim Crockett Promotions personnel =

Jim Crockett Promotions was a professional wrestling promotion headquartered in Charlotte, North Carolina, United States that traded from 1931 to 1988. The name was revived for a separate promotion that held its first show in July 2022.

== Alumni ==
Birth name	Ring name(s)	Tenure	Ref
Christopher Adams ^{†}	Chris Adams	1987	
Terry Wayne Allen	Magnum T. A.	1984–1986	
Randall Alls	Randy Rose	1985; 1987	
Bradley Anderson	Brad Anderson	1988	
Eugene Anderson ^{†}	Gene Anderson	1967–1985	
Randall Anderson^{†}	Randy Anderson	1985–1988	
Tommy Angel	Tommy Angel	1987–1988	
Arthur Anoa'i ^{†}	Afa	1985	
Leati Anoa'i ^{†}	Sika	1985	
Samula Anoa'i	The Tahitian Prince	1987	
Christopher Ashford-Smith ^{†}	Chris Champion	1987–1988	
Shohei Baba ^{†}	Giant Baba	1977; 1982–1983; 1986–1987	
Roger Barnes	Ron Garvin	1968–1969; 1972–1973; 1976; 1984–1988	
Ferrin Barr Jr.	Jesse Barr	1984	
George Becker ^{†}	George Becker	1958; 1960–1962; 1965–1967; 1971	
Scott Bigelow ^{†}	Bam Bam Bigelow	1988	
Al Blake ^{†}	Vladimir Petrov	1987	
Tully Blanchard	Tully Blanchard	1977–1978; 1983–1988	
Richard Blood	Ricky Steamboat	1977–1985	
Aldo Bogni^{†}	Aldo Bogni	1965–1969	
Steve Borden	Sting	1987–1988	
William Boulware Jr.^{†}	Rocky King	1985–1988	
Wayde Bowles^{†}	Rocky Johnson; Sweet Ebony Diamond	1980–1981; 1985–1986	
Adolfo Bresciano^{†}	Dino Bravo	1976–1979; 1986	
Freddie Brisco^{†}	Jack Brisco	1971–1975; 1978; 1980; 1982–1984	
Gerald Brisco	Jerry Brisco	1970–1975; 1978; 1980–1984	
Dennis Brown	Denny Brown	1981; 1984–1987	
Jerry Brown ^{†}	Jerry Brown	1977	
Robert Bruggers ^{†}	Bob Bruggers	1973–1975	
James Brunzell	Jim Brunzell	1979–1980	
David Canal	David Patterson	1978–1980; 1982; 1986–1987	
Ray Canty ^{†}	Kareem Muhammad	1984–1987	
Scott Casey	Scott Casey	1973–1974; 1985	
Bobby Cash	Porkchop Cash	1982–1983; 1987	
Tom Cassett ^{†}	Teijo Khan	1986–1987	
Bob Caudle ^{†}	Bob Caudle	1960s-1988	
Manuel Chaij ^{†}	Amazing Zuma	1960; 1967–1968; 1973–1974	
Eldridge Coleman ^{†}	Billy Graham	1975–1977; 1984–1985	
Carlos Colón	Carlos Colón	1983–1985	
Nelson Combs ^{†}	Nelson Royal	1965–1968; 1971–1975; 1983; 1986–1987	
Dennis Condrey ^{†}	Dennis Condrey	1973; 1985–1987	
Plasse Conway ^{†}	Tiger Conway	1974–1979; 1988	
Plasee Conway Jr.	Tiger Conway Jr.	1974–1979; 1987–1988	
James Cornette	Jim Cornette	1980s	
Thomas Couch ^{†}	Tommy Rogers	1988	
James Crockett Jr. ^{†}	Jim Crockett Jr.	1973–1989	
David Crockett (wrestling)	David Crockett	1970s–1988	
James Crockett ^{†}	Jim Crockett	1940s-1973	
William Cruickshanks	Bill Dundee	1985–1987	
Roland Daniels ^{†}	Elijah Akeem; Leroy Brown	1981–1982; 1984	
Barry Darsow	Krusher Khruschev	1984–1986	
Michael Davis	Bugsy McGraw	1983; 1987–1988	
Michael Davis ^{†}	Mike Davis	1981–1985	
George Drake ^{†}	George Drake	1965	
William Eadie	The Masked Superstar	1976–1982; 1985	
Robert Eaton ^{†}	Bobby Eaton	1981; 1985–1988	
Paul Ellering	Paul Ellering	1986–1988	
Barbara Ellison	Betty Boucher	1965	
William Ensor ^{†}	Buddy Landel	1981–1982; 1985–1986	
Harvey Evers ^{†}	Rip Hawk	1961–1962; 1965–1974	
Jack Faggart ^{†}	Sonny Fargo	1962; 1965–1966; 1974	
James Fanning	Jimmy Valiant	1981–1988	
Emanuel Fernandez	Manny Fernandez	1984–1987	
Raymond Fernandez ^{†}	The Assassin #2	1983–1984	
Richard Fliehr (Note: The future Ric Flair received the name of Richard Fliehr upon his adoption as an infant. His actual birth name is unknown due to the circumstances of his adoption via the scandal-ridden Tennessee Children's Home Society.)	Ric Flair	1974–1988	
Paul Frederik ^{†}	Paul Jones	1968; 1971–1989	
John Frenkel III	John Tatum	1985	
Tatsumi Fujinami	Dr. Fujinami	1976–1977	
Harry Fujiwara ^{†}	Mr. Fuji	1974–1975; 1981–1982	
Dorrance Funk Jr.	Dory Funk Jr. The Masked Outlaw	1969–1973; 1977; 1982–1985; 1987	
Terrence Funk ^{†}	Terry Funk	1971; 1973; 1975–1976; 1983; 1985; 1987	
James Williams	Jim Garvin; Jimmy Garvin	1977–1978; 1986–1988	
Richard Garza ^{†}	Mighty Igor	1976–1979	
Robert Geigel ^{†}	Bob Geigel		
Ruben Gibson	Robert Gibson	1985–1988	
Thomas Gilbert Jr. ^{†}	Eddie Gilbert	1987–1988	
José Gomez ^{†}	Pepper Gomez	1969	
Terry Gordy ^{†}	Terry Gordy	1981–1982; 1987	
Michael Gossett ^{†}	Mike Graham	1973; 1983–1985; 1987	
Brian Gower	Brian Adias	1984–1985	
George Gray	George Gray	1982–1983; 1987	
Salvador Guerrero III ^{†}	Chavo Guerrero	1982–1983; 1986–1987	
Héctor Guerrero	Hector Guerrero; Lazer Tron	1986–1987	
Scott Hall ^{†}	American Starship Coyote; Scott Hall	1984–1987	
Joseph Hamilton ^{†}	The Assassin; The Assassin #1	1983–1986	
Larry Hamilton ^{†}	Larry Hamilton; The Missouri Mauler	1960; 1967–1972; 1974–1978; 1981 1984	
John Hansen II	Stan Hansen	1982; 1984–1986	
Robert Hanson ^{†}	Swede Hanson	1962; 1965–1976; 1978–1981	
James Harrell	Boris Zhukov	1980–1983; 1985	
James Harris ^{†}	Kamala	1984–1985	
Rick Harris ^{†}	Black Bart; Ricky Harris	1981–1988	
Alfred Hayes ^{†}	Lord Alfred Hayes	1981–1982	
William Haynes III	Billy Jack Haynes	1985	
Ronald Heard^{†}	Ron Bass	1981–1982; 1984–1987	
Dave Hebner†	Dave Hebner	1970s–1980s	
Earl Hebner	Earl Hebner	1980s–1988	
Michael Hegstrand^{†}	Road Warrior Hawk	1986–1988	
Dale Hey^{†}	Buddy Roberts	1977; 1985; 1987	
Paul Heyman	Paul Heyman	1988	
Melissa Hiatt	Missy Hyatt	1987–1988	
James Hillman	Mike Miller	1981–1982; 1986	
James Hines	Bobby Fulton	1986; 1988	
Tim Horner	Tim Horner	1981–1982; 1984; 1986–1988	
Barry Horowitz	Barry Hart; Brett Hart; Jack Hart	1983–1984; 1987	
Barney Irwin	Bill Irwin; Super Destroyer #1	1981; 1985–1988	
Scott Irwin ^{†}	Scott Irwin; The Super Destroyer; Super Destroyer #2	1977–1979; 1981; 1984–1986	
Abe Jacobs ^{†}	Abe Jacobs	1962; 1965–1966; 1968; 1972; 1974–1975; 1977–1981; 1983	
Joseph James^{†}	Bob Armstrong	1974; 1981–1982; 1984; 1987	
Robert James†	Brad Armstrong	1984; 1986–1988	
Robert Jeaudoin^{†}	Bobby Jaggers	1986–1987	
James Jefferson^{†}	Jim Jefferson; Spike	1985–1987	
Mack Jefferson	Basher; Mack Jeffers	1985–1987	
Larry Johnson ^{†}	Sonny King	1974–1975	
Joel Jones	Joel Deaton; Thunderfoot #1	1983–1987	
Tommy Jones	Tommy Lane	1984–1985	
Juan Kachmanian^{†}	Pampero Firpo	1967	
Stephen Keirn	Steve Keirn	1975–1976; 1985–1987	
Wayne Keown	Dutch Mantel	1986–1987	
Charles Kernodle Jr.^{†}	Don Kernodle	1974–1976; 1978–1986	
Wally Kernodle	Rocky Kernodle	1981–1986	
Eugene Kiniski^{†}	Gene Kiniski	1967–1969	
Kelly Kiniski	Kelly Kiniski	1981–1983	
Yasuhiro Kojima^{†}	Hiro Matsuda	1968–1969	
Francis Labiak	Gordon Solie	1987	
Richard E. Landrum	Rich Landrum	1978–1982	
Wallace Lane	Stan Lane	1985–1986	
John Laurinaitis	Johnny Ace	1987–1988	
Joseph Laurinaitis^{†}	Road Warrior Animal	1982; 1984–1988	
Mark Lewin	Mark Lewin	1983	
Gene Ligon	Gene Ligon; Thunderfoot #2	1984–1988	
Carey Lloyd^{†}	Rufus R. Jones	1973–1980; 1983–1984; 1986	
Theodore Long	Theodore Long	1985–1989	
Martin Lunde	Arn Anderson	1984–1988	
Bronko Lupsity^{†}	Bronko Lubich	1965–1966; 1968–1970	
Thomas Machlay	Tommy Young	1975–1989	
Leslie Malady	Les Thatcher	1960s 1970s	
Chris Markoff †	Chris Markoff	1970; 1981–1982; 1985	
Micheal McCord	Austin Idol; Dennis McCord	1972; 1981–1982	
Edward McDaniel^{†}	Wahoo McDaniel	1974–1987	
Akihisa Mera	The Great Kabuki	1983–1985	
Omar Mijares	Omar Atlas	1965–1966	
Dan Miller^{†}	Dan Miller	1971; 1974–1978	
Robert Miller^{†}	Butch Miller	1980; 1985–1988	
John Minton^{†}	Big John Studd; Chuck O'Connor; The Masked Superstar #2	1974–1975; 1978–1983	
Mike Morgan	Rip Morgan	1988	
James Morrison	J. J. Dillon	1985–1989	
Richard Morton	Ricky Morton	1978; 1985–1988	
Angelo Mosca^{†}	Angelo Mosca	1975-1976; 1980–1984	
Angelo Mosca Jr.	Angelo Mosca Jr.	1984; 1986–1987	
Donald Muraco	Don Muraco	1981–1982	
Hoyt Murdoch^{†}	Dick Murdoch	1974; 1977–1978; 1986–1988	
John Murphy^{†}	Skull Murphy	1965; 1969	
Rikki Nelson	Rikki Nelson	1987–1988	
Paul Neu	Avalanche	1988	
Lynda Newton	Dark Journey	1987	
Patrick O'Connor^{†}	Pat O'Connor	1960; 1962	
Paul Orndorff Jr.^{†}	Paul Orndorff	1978–1979	
Aldo Ortiz	Ricky Santana	1986–1988	
Robert Orton Jr.	Bob Orton Jr.	1982–1984	
Robert Orton^{†}	Bob Orton	1961; 1965	
Matthew Osborne^{†}	Matt Borne	1981–1982	
Christopher Pallies^{†}	Crippler Canyon; King Kong Bundy	1981; 1984	
King Parsons Jr.	King Parsons	1982–1983; 1987	
Kenneth Patera	Ken Patera	1974–1979; 1981	
Claude Patterson	Thunderbolt Patterson	1972–1973; 1977	
Al Perez	Al Perez	1988	
Oreal Perras^{†}	Ivan Koloff	1974–1975; 1980–1982; 1984–1988	
Josip Peruzović^{†}	Nikolai Volkoff	1981	
Lawrence Pfohl	Lex Luger	1987–1988	
Michel Pigeon^{†}	Jos LeDuc	1982–1983	
Garfield Portz	Scott McGhee	1980–1981; 1983	
James Prudhomme^{†}	Brute Bernard	1965; 1969; 1971–1980	
Harley Race^{†}	Harley Race	1973; 1975; 1977–1986	
James Raschke	Baron von Raschke	1977–1980; 1983–1987	
Robert Rechsteiner	Rick Steiner	1986–1988	
Steve Regal	Steve Regal	1978–1979; 1985–1986; 1988	
Robert Remus	Sgt. Slaughter	1981–1986	
Thomas Richardson	Tommy Rich	1981–1985	
Kenneth Rinehurst	Russian Assassin #2	1988	
Sylvester Ritter^{†}	Junkyard Dog	1984	
Nickla Roberts	Baby Doll	1985–1988	
Byron Robertson^{†}	Dewey Robertson	1979–1981	
Alan Rogowski †	Ole Anderson	1969; 1972–1982; 1985–1988	
Chris Romero^{†}	Chris Youngblood	1984	
Mark Romero	Mark Youngblood	1983–1984; 1986	
Steven Romero^{†}	Jay Youngblood	1978–1984	
Richard Rood^{†}	Rick Rude	1982; 1986–1987	
James Ross	Jim Ross	1988	
Lawrence Rotunda	Mike Rotunda	1982–1984; 1987–1988	
André Roussimoff^{†}	André the Giant	1974–1978; 1980–1981; 1983	
Gary Rowell	Gary Royal	1983–1984; 1986–1988	
Virgil Runnels Jr.^{†}	Dusty Rhodes	1975–1977; 1979; 1981–1988	
Gary Sabaugh	The Italian Stallion	1984–1988	
Kazuo Sakurada^{†}	Kendo Nagasaki; The Ninja	1981–1983; 1985	
Noah Schiavone	Tony Schiavone	1983	1988
Mark Sciarra	Rip Rogers	1984–1985	
Angus Scott^{†}	Sandy Scott	1960; 1965; 1967–1977	
George Scott^{†}	George Scott	1960; 1962; 1965; 1967–1969; 1974; 1977; 1981	
Michael Seitz	Michael Hayes	1981–1982; 1985; 1987–1988	
David Sheldon^{†}	The Angel of Death; Russian Assassin #1	1987–1988	
Genichiro Shimada	Genichiro Tenryu	1977; 1980–1983	
Lawrence Shreve	Abdullah the Butcher	1981–1983; 1985–1986	
Ronald Simmons	Ron Simmons	1987–1988	
Lawrence Simon^{†}	Boris Malenko	1965; 1971; 1975–1979	
Nelson Simpson	Nikita Koloff	1984–1988	
Richard Slater^{†}	Dick Slater	1983–1986	
Aurelian Smith Jr.	Jake Roberts	1981–1984; 1986	
Aurelian Smith^{†}	Jake Smith; Tiny Anderson	1962–1963; 1965	
James Wiley Smith^{†}	Jimmy Snuka	1978–1981	
Michael Smith	Sam Houston	1983–1987	
George South	George South	1985–1988	
Daniel Spivey	Dan Spivey	1984–1985	
Dick Steinborn^{†}	Dick Steinborn	1962	
Larry Stephens	Larry Stephens	1987–1988	
Carl Stevens^{†}	Ray Stevens	1958; 1975–1977; 1980–1983	
Adrian Street^{†}	Adrian Street	1983–1984	
John Sutton^{†}	Oliver Humperdink	1987–1988	
Diane Syms	Misty Blue	1986–1988	
Terry Szopinski	The Warlord	1986–1988	
Debbie Szostecki	Debbie Combs	1985–1986	
Bill Tabb	Bill Tabb; The Black Assassin	1986–1987	
Paul Taylor III	Terry Taylor	1981–1982; 1985–1988	
Les Thornton^{†}	Les Thornton	1979; 1981; 1984	
Roderick Toombs^{†}	Roddy Piper	1980–1983	
Eric Tovey^{†}	Lord Littlebrook	1961; 1965; 1968; 1971; 1975–1977; 1985	
Ray Traylor Jr.^{†}	Bubba Rogers	1986–1987	
Billy Two Rivers^{†}	Billy Two Rivers	1958; 1962; 1965	
Buzz Tyler^{†}	Buzz Tyler	1984–1985	
Sione Vailahi	The Barbarian; Konga the Barbarian	1984–1988	
Hossein Vaziri ^{†}	Ali Vaziri; The Iron Sheik	1973–1974; 1980–1981	
Sean Vellenga	Sean Royal	1984; 1987	
Richard Vigneault	Rick Martel	1985–1986	
Kenneth Weaver^{†}	Johnny Weaver	1962; 1965; 1967–1985	
George Wells	George Wells	1980–1981; 1988	
Pezavan Whatley^{†}	Pez Whatley; Shaska Whatley	1983–1988	
Lawrence Whistler	Larry Zbyszko	1975; 1985–1988	
Anthony White	Tony Atlas	1975–1979; 1984	
Bill White^{†}	Bill White; The Blue Demon; The Destroyer; The Scorpion	1973–1988	
Brian Wickens	Luke Williams	1985–1988	
Gary Williams^{†}	Gary Hart	1988	
Patricia Williams	Precious	1986–1988	
Steven Williams^{†}	Steve Williams	1986–1988	
Barry Windham	Barry Windham	1981–1982; 1984; 1986–1988	
Kendell Windham	Kendall Windham	1987–1988	
Robert Windham^{†}	Blackjack Mulligan	1975–1981; 1984; 1987	
John Wisniski^{†}	Johnny Valentine	1962; 1973–1975	
Jonathan Wisniski	Greg Valentine	1976–1984	
George Woodin^{†}	Mr. Wrestling; Tim Woods	1968–1969; 1975–1980	
Brett Woyan^{†}	Brett Sawyer	1980; 1985–1986	
Bruce Woyan^{†}	Buzz Sawyer	1980; 1982; 1984–1987	
Edward Wright^{†}	Bearcat Wright	1973–1975	
Thomas Zenk^{†}	Tom Zenk	1985	

== See also ==
- List of World Championship Wrestling alumni
