= List of former Universal Wrestling Federation (Bill Watts) personnel =

The Universal Wrestling Federation was a professional wrestling promotion based in Oklahoma City, Oklahoma from 1979 to 1987. Former employees in the UWF consisted of professional wrestlers, managers, play-by-play and color commentators, announcers, interviewers and referees.

== Alumni ==
=== Male Wrestlers ===
Birth Name:	Ring Name(s):	Tenure:	Notes
Chris Adams^{†}	Chris Adams	1984–1987	
Kerry Adkisson^{†}	Kerry Von Erich	1981; 1983–1985	
Michael Adkisson^{†}	Mike Von Erich	1984	
Robert Alexander^{†}	Ben Alexander	1980; 1985	
Terry Allen	Magnum T. A. / Terry Allen	1983–1986	
Randall Alls	Randy Alls	1987	
Darrell Anthony	Tony Anthony / Grappler #2	1982–1983; 1985	
Arthur Anoaʻi, Sr.^{†}	Afa	1981–1983	
Leati Anoaʻi^{†}	Sika	1981–1982	
Rodney Anoaʻi^{†}	Kokina the Samoan / Samoan Kokina	1987	
Victor Arko	Mike Kelly	1980	
William Arko^{†}	Pat Kelly	1980	
Christopher Ashford-Smith^{†}	Chris Champion	1987	
Norvell Austin	Norvell Austin	1984	
Douglas Baker^{†}	Ox Baker	1980	
Víctor Barajas	Black Gordman	1983–1984	
Roger Barnes	Ron Garvin	1980; 1986	
Ferrin Barr, Jr.	Jesse Barr	1981–1982	
Vince Billotto	Vinnie Romeo	1981–1982	
B. Brian Blair	Brian Blair	1980–1982	
Al Blake	Vladimir Petrov	1987	
Tully Blanchard	Tully Blanchard	1980; 1982; 1984; 1987	
Nick Bockwinkel^{†}	Nick Bockwinkel	1983; 1986	
Terry Bollea	Hulk Hogan	1980	
Larry Booker^{†}	Larry Booker	1980–1981	
Steve Borden	Blade Runner Sting / Sting	1986–1987	
Mike Bowyer^{†}	Mike Boyette / Mike Boyer	1979–1982; 1987	
Lee Earl Boyd	Mad Dog Boyd	1985–1986	
Jonathan Boyle^{†}	Jonathan Boyd	1979	
Todd Brafford	Todd Champion	1987	
Timothy Brooks^{†}	Killer Brooks	1985	
Vince Bryant^{†}	Steven Little Bear	1980	
Phil Buckley^{†}	Colonel Buck Robley	1975–1982	
Richard Cain^{†}	Ricky Gibson	1984–1986	
Ray Candy^{†}	Kareem Muhammad / Ray Candy / The Zambui	1980; 1985; 1987	
Bob Carson^{†}	Bob Sweetan	1979–1980; 1984–1985	
Steven Casey	Steve Casey	1985	
Bobby Cash	Porkchop Cash	1979; 1984–1986	
Randy Colley^{†}	The Champion / The Masked Champion / Nightmare	1985–1986	
Dennis Condrey	Dennis Condrey	1983–1987^{CWA}	
Plasee Conway Jr.	Tiger Conway Jr.	1983; 1987	
Wendell Cooley	Wendell Cooley / Rick Casey	1985–1986	
Thomas Couch^{†}	Tommy Rogers	1984–1987	
Eddie Crawford^{†}	The Snowman	1985	
Art Crews	Art Crews	1983–1984; 1986–1987	
Pablo Ordaz Crispín^{†}	Great Goliath	1984	
William Cruickshanks	Bill Dundee	1979; 1984–1986	
Ruben Cruz^{†}	Hercules Ayala	1979	
Roland Daniels^{†}	Leroy Brown	1980–1981; 1986–1987	
Barry Darsow	Crusher Darsow / Krusher Darsow / Krusher Khrushchev	1983–1984	
Michael Davis	Bugsy McGraw	1987	
William DeCoff	Sean O'Reilly	1985–1986	
Edward Denton	Len Denton / The Grappler / Grappler #1	1980–1983; 1985	
Theodore DiBiase	Ted DiBiase	1979–1987	
Tim Dodson	Tim Patterson	1987	
Steven Doll^{†}	Steve Doll	1985–1986	
Charles Donovan	Chick Donovan	1981	
James Duggan Jr.	Jim Duggan	1982–1987	
Bobby Duncum Sr.	Bobby Duncum	1983	
Bill Eadie	Masked Superstar / Masked Superstar #1	1983; 1985–1986	
Bobby Eaton^{†}	Bobby Eaton	1983–1984^{CWA} 1986–1987	
Rob Elowitch	Ron Ellis	1986–1987	
Douglas Embry	Eric Embry	1979	
Ulualoaiga Emelio^{†}	Cocoa Samoa	1980–1982; 1984	
William Ensor^{†}	Buddy Landel	1981–1986	
Wayne Ermatinger	Mike Blood	1980	
James Fanning	Jimmy Valiant	1987	
Anthony Felker	Tony Falk	1984–1985	
Emanuel Fernandez	Manny Fernandez	1987	
Raymond Fernandez^{†}	Hercules Hernandez / Mr. Wrestling #2	1984–1985	
Richard Ferrara^{†}	Igor Putski / Rick Ferrara	1979–1982	
Doug Fisher	Terminator Wolf	1987	
Mark Fleming	Mark Fleming	1987	
Richard Fliehr	Ric Flair	1984–1987	
John Frankel III	John Tatum	1986	
Paul Frederick^{†}	Paul Jones	1987	
Mick Foley	Jack Foley	1987	
Joseph Fornini	Joe Savoldi	1984; 1986	
Dory Funk Jr.	Dory Funk Jr.	1980; 1987	
Terrance Funk^{†}	Terry Funk	1980	
Jean Gagné^{†}	Frenchy Martin	1980	
Juan Chavarría Galicia^{†}	El Gran Markus	1979–1980	
Jeff Gaylord^{†}	Jeff Gaylord	1986–1987	
Michael George	Mike George	1979–1982; 1986–1987	
Herbert Gerwig^{†}	Killer Karl Kox	1979–1982	
Doug Gilbert	The Enforcer	1987	
Thomas Gilbert Jr.^{†}	Eddie Gilbert	1985–1987	
Terry Gordy^{†}	Terry Gordy	1979–1987	
Brian Gower	Brian Adias	1984	
Daryll Gower^{†}	Steve "The Brawler" Lawler	1985	
George Gray	One Man Gang / Crusher Broomfield	1982–1983; 1985–1987	
Jerry Grey	Jerry Grey	1984–1985	
Armando Guerrero	Mando Guerrero	1987	
Héctor Guerrero	Héctor Guerrero / Lazer Tron	1984–1987	
Salvador Guerrero III^{†}	Chavo Guerrero	1982–1987	
Joseph Hamilton^{†}	The Assassin	1980; 1987	
Joseph Hamilton Jr.	Nick Patrick	1985	
John Stanley Hansen II	Stan Hansen	1979; 1986	
Susumu Hara^{†}	Ashura Hara	1981	
James Harrell	Boris Zhukov	1983	
Billy Harris	Billy Starr	1979	
James Harris^{†}	Kamala	1982–1986	
Rick Harris	Black Bart	1987	
Gary Hart	Gary Young	1986–1987	
Richard Hatfield	Ricky Fields	1980	
Michael Hegstrand^{†}	Road Warrior Hawk	1983–1985; 1986–1987	
James Hellwig^{†}	Blade Runner Rock	1986	
Patrick Helvey	Rick McCord	1979; 1984	
Dale Hey^{†}	Buddy Roberts / Buddy Jack Roberts	1980–1987	
Michael Hickenbottom	Shawn Michaels	1984–1985; 1987	
Larry Higgins	Grizzly Boone / Larry Higgins	1983–1984; 1987	
James Hillman	Mike Miller	1980–1981	
James Hines	Bobby Fulton	1984–1987	
Tim Horner	Tim Horner	1982–1985; 1987	
Mike Hudspeth	Mike Hudspeth	1981	
Barney Irwin	Bill Irwin	1979–1980; 1983; 1986–1987	
Scott Irwin^{†}	The Super Destroyer / Super Destroyer #1	1980–1983	
Cary Jackson^{†}	Colt Steele	1987	
Perry Jackson	Perry Jackson	1984–1986	
Bradley James^{†}	Brad Armstrong	1984–1985; 1987	
Frederick Jannetty	Marty Oates	1983	
James Jefferson^{†}	Spike	1987	
Lawrence Jefferson	Basher	1987	
Brian Jewel	Joe Lightfoot	1983	
James Johnson^{†}	Luke Graham	1979; 1981	
Joel Jones	Thunderfoot #1	1987	
Charles Kalani Jr.^{†}	Toru Tanaka	1980	
Don Kalt^{†}	Don Garfield	1979	
Ruben Kane	Robert Gibson	1984–1987	
Stephen Keirn	Steve Keirn	1986	
Wayne Keown	Dutch Mantell	1985–1986	
Jacobo Kerszberg^{†}	The Turk	1979–1981	
James Kimble	King Cobra	1979–1983; 1986	
Kelly Kiniski	Kelly Kiniski / Masked Superstar #2	1981–1983; 1985–1986	
Steve Kyle^{†}	Steve "The Brawler" Lawler	1980	
Ernest Ladd^{†}	Ernie Ladd	1979–1982; 1984–1985	
Wallace Lane	Stan Lane	1979; 1986–1987	
John Laurinaitis	Johnny Ace	1987	
Joseph Laurinaitis^{†}	Road Warrior Animal	1983–1985; 1986–1987	
Marcus Laurinaitis	The Terminator	1987	
Jerry Lawler	Jerry Lawler	1980; 1985	
Mark Lewin	Mark Lewin	1980	
Tom Lintz	Tom Lintz	1983–1984	
Roberto López	Roberto Soto	1980	
Frank Luhovy^{†}	Frankie Lane	1985–1986	
Martin Lunde	Marty Lunde / Arn Anderson	1982–1984; 1986–1987	
Ken Lusk	Ken Mantell	1980–1981	
Robert Markovich	Bob Bradley	1987	
Troy Martin	Shane Douglas / Troy Orndorff	1987	
Dennis McCord	Austin Idol	1980	
Edward McDaniel^{†}	Wahoo McDaniel	1979–1980; 1985	
Ron McFarlane	Ron McFarlane	1980	
Douglas McMichen^{†}	Tank Patton	1979–1980	
Akihisa Mera^{†}	The Great Kabuki	1981; 1985	
Omar Mijares	Buddy Moreno	1984–1985	
Robert Miller^{†}	Butch Miller	1984; 1986–1987	
Charles Milliser^{†}	J.R. Hogg	1986	
John Minton^{†}	John Studd	1982–1983	
Gerald Monti^{†}	Jerry Monti	1987	
Frank Morrell	The Angel	1979–1981	
Angelo Mosca^{†}	Angelo Mosca	1979	
Hoyt Murdoch^{†}	Dick Murdoch	1979–1983; 1985–1987	
Jim Neidhart^{†}	Jim Neidhart	1983–1984	
John Nord	The Barbarian / The Viking	1985; 1987	
Larry Oliver, Sr.^{†}	Rip Oliver / Rick Oliver	1980; 1984–1985	
Paul Orndorff^{†}	Paul Orndorff	1979–1982	
Terry Orndorff	Terry Orndorff	1980–1981	
Lenny Ornstein	Jack Armstrong	1987	
Randal Orton^{†}	Barry Orton	1984	
Robert Orton, Jr.	Bob Orton, Jr.	1981–1982; 1978; 1983	
Robert Orton, Sr.^{†}	Bob Orton	1981	
Matt Osborne^{†}	Matt Borne	1982–1983	
Robert Owen^{†}	Bob Owens	1980; 1984	
Masashi Ozawa	Killer Khan	1980	
Christopher Pailles^{†}	King Kong Bundy	1983	
King Parsons Jr.	Iceman King Parsons	1983–1987	
Kenneth Patera	Ken Patera	1979	
Alex Pérez	Al Pérez	1985–1987	
Josip Peruzović^{†}	Nikolai Volkoff	1983–1984	
Oreal Perras^{†}	Ivan Koloff	1979–1980; 1986–1987	
David Peterson^{†}	Dave Peterson	1986	
Gene Petit^{†}	Gene Lewis	1979–1980	
Lawrence Pfohl	Lex Luger	1987	
Lanny Poffo^{†}	Lanny Poffo	1983–1984	
Thomas Prichard	Tom Prichard / Tom Price	1979; 1983; 1985	
Harley Race^{†}	Harley Race	1982	
Jeffrey Raitz ^{†}	Jeff Raitz	1986–1987	
Manuel Ramos^{†}	Bull Ramos	1979–1981	
James Raschke	Baron von Raschke	1986–1987	
Robert Rechsteiner	Rick Steiner / Rob Rechsteiner / The Enforcer	1984–1987	
Bruce Reed^{†}	Bruce Reed / Butch Reed	1980; 1983–1986	
Abel Reynosa^{†}	Taras Bulba	1986	
John Richardson	Johnny Rich	1983	
Thomas Richardson	Tommy Rich	1980–1981; 1983	
John Richmond	Eli the Eliminator	1986–1987	
Dan Rignati	Terminator Riggs / Dan Rignati	1987	
Ken Rinehurst	Jack Victory	1984–1987	
Sylvester Ritter^{†}	Junkyard Dog / Stagger Lee	1979–1984	
Juan Rivera	El Corsario	1985	
Byron Robertson^{†}	The Missing Link	1983; 1986–1987	
Guadalupe Robledo^{†}	José Lothario	1979–1980; 1983–1984	
Aaron Rodríguez	Mil Máscaras	1982–1983	
Alan Rogowski^{†}	Ole Anderson	1980	
Richard Rood^{†}	Rick Rude / Ricky Rood	1983–1984; 1987	
Robert Roop	Bob Roop	1981–1982	
Robert Ross, Jr.	Ranger Ross	1987	
Lawrence Rotunda	Mike Rotunda	1987	
André Roussimoff^{†}	André the Giant	1980–1983	
Virgil Runnels Jr.^{†}	Dusty Rhodes	1979–1987	
Ted Russell^{†}	Savannah Jack	1986–1987	
Gary Sabaugh	The Italian Stallion	1987	
Gadowar Sahota	Gama Singh	1979–1980	
Kazuo Sakurada^{†}	The Black Ninja	1983	
Frank Santen^{†}	Frank Dusek	1980–1981	
Hugo Savinovich	Hugo Savinovich	1980	
Mark Sciarra	Rip Rogers	1983	
Frederick Seawright^{†}	Brickhouse Brown	1984–1986	
Michael Seitz	Michael Hayes	1979–1981; 1984–1987	
Don Serrano^{†}	Don Serrano	1981	
Mike Sharpe, Jr.^{†}	Mike Sharpe	1979–1980; 1982–1983	
David Sheldon^{†}	Angel of Death	1986–1987	
Ronald Simmons	Ron Simmons	1987	
Nelson Simpson	Nikita Koloff	1986–1987	
David Slinker^{†}	Ron Slinker	1979	
Aurelian Smith, Jr.	Jake Roberts	1979–1981; 1983–1986	
Michael Smith	Sam Houston	1987	
Bill Smithson^{†}	Dizzy Golden	1979	
Tracy Smothers^{†}	Tracy Smothers	1984; 1986	
Merced Solis	Tito Santana	1983–1984	
Anthony Stansell	Tony Zane	1983	
Tom Stanton	Tom Stanton	1983	
George Stipich^{†}	Stan Stasiak	1980	
Richard Stratten	Ricky Morton	1984–1987	
David Strawn	Korstia Korchenko / Mike Diamond	1980; 1986	
Jerry Stubbs	Mr. Olympia / Jerry Stubbs	1979; 1982–1984	
Kevin Sullivan	Kevin Sullivan / Johnny West	1987	
Rick Taras	Rick Patterson	1987	
Don Taylor^{†}	Tug Taylor	1981; 1987	
Paul Taylor III	Terry Taylor	1984–1987	
Curtis Thompson	Curtis Thompson	1987	
Troy Thompson, Jr.^{†}	Troy Graham	1984	
Masanori Toguchi	Kim Duk	1981; 1983	
Ray Traylor Jr.^{†}	Big Bubba Rogers	1987	
Sione Vailahi	The Barbarian	1985; 1987	
Richard Van Slater	Dick Slater	1984–1986	
Vaziri, Hossein|Hossein Vaziri}^{†}}	The Iron Sheik	1981	
Todd Veasey	Dale Veasey	1984–1985	
Kevin Wacholz	Kevin Kelly / Thor	1985	
John Walker^{†}	Mr. Wrestling II	1979–1980; 1982–1984	
James Ware	Koko B. Ware / Koko Ware	1986	
William Watts Jr.	Bill Watts	1979–1981; 1984–1986	
George Weingeroff	George Weingeroff	1983–1984; 1987	
George Wells	George Wells / Master Gee	1980; 1984	
Pezavan Whatley^{†}	Pez Whatley / Shaska Whatley / The Shadow	1986–1987	
Lawrence Whistler	Larry Zbyszko	1983; 1987	
Anthony White	Tony Atlas / Black Atlas	1979–1980; 1982–1983	
Brian Wickens	Luke Williams	1984; 1986–1987	
James Williams	Jimmy Garvin	1980–1981; 1983–1984; 1987	
Steve Williams^{†}	Steve Williams	1982–1987	
Barry Windham	Barry Windham	1987	
Kendall Windham	Kendall Windham	1987	
Edward Wiskoski	Ed Wiskoski	1981–1982	
Charles Wolfe Jr.^{†}	Gino Hernandez	1979–1980; 1982–1985	
Brett Woyan	Brett Sawyer / Brett Wayne	1980–1981; 1984–1986	
Bruce Woyan^{†}	Buzz Sawyer	1979; 1983; 1985–1987	
Hiroshi Yagi^{†}	Super Ninja	1987	
Galton Young^{†}	Skip Young	1987	
Thomas Zenk^{†}	Tom Zenk	1984	
Unknown	Carl Fergie	1981; 1983–1984	
Unknown	Steve Cox	1987	W

=== Female Wrestlers ===
Birth Name:	Ring Name(s):	Tenure:	Notes
Lucille Ann Casey^{†}	Ann Casey	1980	
Judy Hardee	Judy Martin	1979–1982	
Peggy Lee^{†}	Peggy Lee	1984	
Velvet Mykietowich	Velvet McIntyre	1984	
Debra Newkirk^{†}	Tracy Richards	1980	
Linda Newton	Dark Journey	1985–1987	
Vickie Otis	Princess Victoria	1982; 1984	
Wendi Richter	Wendi Richter	1980; 1984	
Nickla Roberts	Nickla Roberts	1987	
Patty Seymour	Leilani Kai	1980–1982	
Shirl Sprague^{†}	Comrade Orga	1987	
Diane Syms	Misty Blue	1985; 1987	
Debbie Szostecki	Debbie Combs	1983; 1985	
Betty Wade-Murphy	Joyce Grable	1980	
Unknown	Barbie Doll	1981	
Unknown	Carol Summers	1981	
Unknown	Donna Day	1983	
Unknown	Kat LaRoux	1987	
Unknown	Linda Dallas	1985	
Unknown	Suzette Ferrera	1981	

=== Midget Wrestlers ===
Birth Name:	Ring Name(s):	Tenure:	Notes
Jonathan Adams^{†}	Ivan the Terrible	1979	
Shigeri Akabane^{†}	Little Tokyo	1980–1981; 1985	
Steve Eisenhower	Butch Cassidy	1979	
Katie Glass	Diamond Lil	1981	
William Guillot^{†}	Billy the Kid	1979–1980	
Harold Lang^{†}	Cowboy Lang	1979–1981; 1983; 1985–1986	
Stanley Littlejohn^{†}	Little Coco / Little Cocoa	1985	
Eric Tovey	Lord Littlebrook	1985–1986	
Unknown	Lone Eagle		
Unknown	Karate Kid	1986	

=== Stables and Tag Teams ===
Tag Team/Stable(s)	Members	Tenure(s)
The Blade Runners	Blade Runner Rock^{†} and Blade Runner Sting	1986
The Bruise Brothers	Porkchop Cash and Tony Graham	1983
The Bruise Brothers	Porkchop Cash and Mad Dog Boyd	1986
The Canadian Kodiaks	Claw and Bear	1987
Devastation Inc.	Skandar Akbar, One Man Gang, Savannah Jack, Leroy Brown, Kamala, The Missing Link and Bill Irwin	1984–1987
The Dirty White Boys	Lynn Denton and Tony Anthony	1983; 1985
The Enforcers	Enforcer #1 and Enforcer #2	1987
The Fantastics	Bobby Fulton and Tommy Rogers^{†}	1984–1987
The Fabulous Freebirds	Michael Hayes, Terry Gordy^{†} and Buddy Roberts^{†}	1979–1981; 1984–1987
The Fabulous Ones	Stan Lane and Steve Keirn	1986
The Guerreros	Chavo Guerrero^{†} and Hector Guerrero	1985–1986
Hot Stuff International	Eddie Gilbert^{†}, Missy Hyatt, Sting, Rick Steiner, John Tatum and Jack Victory	1986
House of Humperdink	Sir Oliver Humperdink ^{†}, Lord Humongous, The Barbarian and The Nightmare	1985–1986
The Jive Tones	Pez Whatley^{†} and Tiger Conway, Jr.	1987
The Lightning Express	Brad Armstrong^{†} and Tim Horner	1987
The Masked Superstars	Masked Superstar #1 and Masked Superstar #2	1985
The Midnight Express	Dennis Condrey and Bobby Eaton^{†}	1983–1985
The Rat Pack	Ted DiBiase, Jim Duggan and Matt Borne^{†}	1983
The Rock 'n' Roll Express	Ricky Morton and Robert Gibson	1984–1987
The Sheepherders	Butch Miller^{†} and Luke Williams	1984; 1986–1987
The Wild Samoans	Afa and Sika	1981–1982

=== Managers and Valets ===
Birth Name:	Ring Name(s):	Tenure:	Notes
James Cornette	Jim Cornette	1983–1985^{CWA}	
Paul Ellering	Paul Ellering	1983–1985; 1986–1987	
Valerie French	Sunshine	1987	
Lynda Newton	Dark Journey	1985-1987	
Linda Gunthorpe Hawker	Miss Linda	1984	
Melissa Hiatt	Missy Hyatt	1986–1987	
Ernest Ladd^{†}	Ernie Ladd	1981–1982	
James Morrison	J. J. Dillon	1979; 1983; 1987	
John Sutton^{†}	Sir Oliver Humperdink	1985–1986	
Jimmy Wehba^{†}	Skandor Akbar	1983–1966; 1985; 1987	

=== Commentators and interviewers ===
Birth name:	Ring name(s):	Tenure:	Notes
Reisor Bowden^{†}	Reisor Bowden	1979–1984	Ring announcer
Toni Collins^{†}	Toni Adams	1986–1987	Ringside interviewer
Boyd Pierce^{†}	Boyd Pierce	1979–1985	
Bruce Prichard	Bruce Prichard	^{HW}	Ring announcer
James Ross	Jim Ross	1979-1987	Play-by-play commentator
Frank Santen	Frank Dusek		Ringside interviewer
Michael Seitz	Michael Hayes	1986	Color commentator
William Watts Jr.	Bill Watts		Color commentator
Joel Watts	Joel Watts		

=== Referees ===
Birth name:	Ring name(s):	Tenure:	Notes
Unknown	Alfred Neely		
Unknown	Carl Fergie	1986–1987	
Thomas Gilbert, Sr.^{†}	Tommy Gilbert	1984–1987	
Ron West^{†}	Ron West		
Edward Faulk	Edward Faulk		

=== Other personnel ===
Birth name:	Ring name(s):	Tenure:	Notes
John Ayers^{†}	John Ayers	1987	Commissioner
William Cruickshanks	Bill Dundee		Booker
Ernest Ladd^{†}	Ernie Ladd		Booker
William Watts Jr.	Bill Watts	1979–1987	Promoter

Company name to Year
Company name:	Years:
Mid-South Wrestling	1979–1986
Universal Wrestling Federation	1986–1987
Notes
^{†} Indicates they are deceased.
^{‡} Indicates they died while they were employed with the Universal Wrestling Federation.
^{CWA} Indicates they were part of a talent exchange with Continental Wrestling Association.
^{GCW} Indicates they were part of a talent exchange with Georgia Championship Wrestling.
^{HW} Indicates they were part of a talent exchange with Houston Wrestling.
^{JCP} Indicates they were part of a talent exchange with Jim Crockett Promotions.
