= Eddie Graham Memorial Show =

Professional wrestling event

- Promotions: Championship Wrestling from Florida (1987); Florida Championship Wrestling (1988)
- First event: First (1987)
- Last event: Second (1988)

The Eddie Graham Memorial Show was an annual professional wrestling event held in 1987 and 1988 as a tribute to wrestler Eddie Graham. The first show was held by Championship Wrestling from Florida in 1987, shortly before it merged with Jim Crockett Promotions, and by Mike Graham under the Florida Championship Wrestling banner the following year.

The second show was held as an interpromotional supercard including the American Wrestling Association and World Class Championship Wrestling, most notably, featuring a "champion vs. champion" match between WCWA World Heavyweight Champion Kerry von Erich and AWA World Heavyweight Champion Jerry "The King" Lawler in the main event.

== Events ==
#	Event	Date	City	Venue	Main event
1	First Annual Eddie Graham Memorial Show	May 9, 1987	St. Petersburg, Florida	Bayfront Center	Ric Flair (c) vs. Dusty Rhodes for the NWA World Heavyweight Championship
2	Second Annual Eddie Graham Memorial Show	July 30, 1988	Tampa, Florida	Expo Hall	Jerry Lawler (c- AWA) vs. Kerry Von Erich (c - WCWA) in a title unification match for the AWA World Heavyweight Championship and WCWA World Heavyweight Championship
(c) – refers to the champion(s) heading into the match

== Show results ==
=== First Annual Eddie Graham Memorial Show ===
First Annual Eddie Graham Memorial Show
- Promotion: Championship Wrestling from Florida
- Date: May 9, 1987
- City: St. Petersburg, Florida
- Venue: Bayfront Center
- Attendance: 7,676

Event chronology
← Previous; War of the Worlds	Next → Last

Eddie Graham Memorial Show chronology
← Previous; First	Next → 2nd

No.	Results	Stipulations
1	The Fabulous Ones (Steve Keirn and Stan Lane) (c) defeated The MOD Squad (Spike and Basher)	Tag team match for the NWA Florida Tag Team Championship
2	Barry Windham and Ed Gantner defeated Dory Funk Jr. and Samu	Tag team match
3	Mike Rotunda (c) defeated Kevin Sullivan	Singles match for the NWA Florida Heavyweight Championship
4	Rick Rude and Manny Fernandez (c) vs. The Road Warriors (Hawk and Animal) ended in a double-disqualification	Tag team match for the NWA World Tag Team Championship
5	Dusty Rhodes defeated Ric Flair (c) by disqualification	Singles match for the NWA World Heavyweight Championship
(c) / – the champion(s) heading into the match

=== Second Annual Eddie Graham Memorial Show ===
Second Annual Eddie Graham Memorial Show
- Promotion: Championship Wrestling from Florida
- Date: July 30, 1988
- City: Tampa, Florida
- Venue: Expo Hall
- Attendance: 1,000

Event chronology
← Previous; First	Next → The Homecoming

Eddie Graham Memorial Show chronology
← Previous; 1st	Next → Last

No.	Results	Stipulations	Times
1	Johnny Ace defeated Lazertron by pinfall	Singles match	—
2	Scotty the Body vs. Rex King ended in a time-limit draw	Singles match	—
3	Brett Sawyer, Mark Starr and Robbie Idol defeated Jim Backlund, Bob Cook and Scotty the Body	Six-man tag team match	—
4	Denny Brown (c) defeated Frankie Lancaster	Singles match for the FCW Junior Heavyweight Championship	—
5	The Star Riders (Rock and Blade) defeated The Nasty Boys (Brian Knobs and Jerry Sags) by disqualification	Tag team match	—
6	Danny Spivey defeated Dick Slater	Singles match for the vacant FCW Florida Heavyweight Championship	—
7	Eric Embry (c) defeated Lou Perez	Singles match for the WCCW Light Heavyweight Championship	—
8	Badd Company (Paul Diamond and Pat Tanaka) (c) defeated Mike Graham and Steve Keirn	Tag team match for the AWA World Tag Team Championship	—
9	Kerry Von Erich (c - WCWA) defeated Jerry Lawler (c - AWA)	Singles match; AWA World Heavyweight Championship vs. WCWA World Heavyweight Championship	20:00
(c) / – the champion(s) heading into the match
