= D. J. Peterson =

American professional wrestler (1959–1993)

Personal information
- Born: David W. Peterson; July 17, 1959 St. Joseph, Missouri, U.S.
- Died: May 25, 1993 (aged 33) Bethany, Missouri, U.S.
- Cause of death: Motorcycle accident

Professional wrestling career
- Ring name(s): D. J. Peterson; Dave Peterson; David Peterson
- Billed height: 6 ft 3 in (191 cm)
- Billed weight: 264 lb (120 kg)
- Trained by: Mike George; Ronnie Etchison; Lord Littlebrook
- Debut: 1984

David W. Peterson (July 17, 1959 – May 25, 1993), better known by his ring name D. J. Peterson, was an American professional wrestler. He is best known for his tenure in the American Wrestling Association (AWA), where he and The Trooper were the final holders of the AWA World Tag Team Championship.

He also competed in various North American regional promotions, including Central States Wrestling (CSW), where he held the NWA Central States Heavyweight Championship and NWA Central States Tag Team Championship, World Class Championship Wrestling (WCCW), where he held the WCCW Television Championship, National Wrestling Alliance (NWA) and Universal Wrestling Federation (UWF).

== Professional wrestling career ==
Peterson made his debut in 1984, working predominantly for Bob Geigel's Central States Wrestling (CSW). The following year, he began wrestling for Fritz Von Erich's World Class Championship Wrestling (WCCW). At Thanksgiving Star Wars on November 28, 1985, he teamed with Johnny Mantell in a loss to The Grappler and The Missing Link. Four days later, on December 2, Peterson defeated The Grappler to win the vacant WCCW Television Championship, his first professional wrestling championship. He lost the title a week later to Jack Victory. Peterson then wrestled briefly for Bill Watts' Universal Wrestling Federation (UWF), where he was pushed as a "Magnum T.A. look-alike." On April 19, 1986, he teamed with Brett Sawyer in the inaugural Jim Crockett Sr. Memorial Cup Tag Team Tournament, losing to Black Bart and Jimmy Garvin in the first round. On November 7, Peterson and Todd Champion defeated Thunderfoots (Dave Deaton and Joel Deaton) to win the NWA Central States Tag Team Championship. They lost the titles to the MOD Squad (Basher and Spike) on January 2, 1987.

In February 1987, Peterson moved to Verne Gagne's American Wrestling Association (AWA) under the modified ring name D.J. Peterson. In his first match, he fought Kevin Kelly to a time limit draw. He also fought Super Ninja to a draw at SuperClash II on May 2. Throughout the year, Peterson (with Wahoo McDaniel) challenged Boris Zhukov and Soldat Ustinov several times for the AWA World Tag Team Championship, as well as Curt Hennig for the AWA World Heavyweight Championship, but failed to win the titles. On December 25, Peterson defeated Bob Brown to win the NWA Central States Heavyweight Championship. Despite the title being held-up for unknown reasons, he regained it by defeating The Cuban Assassin on February 18, 1988, holding the title until he left Central States Wrestling later that year.

From May to June 1988, Peterson wrestled for New Japan Pro-Wrestling (NJPW) as part of the "IWGP Champion Series 1988" tour, often teaming with Adrian Adonis, Dick Murdoch and Owen Hart and facing the likes of Kengo Kimura, Masa Saito and Riki Choshu. The following month, he began appearing for the World Wrestling Federation (WWF) as a jobber until September, although he received victories over other jobbers including Barry Horowitz and Lanny Poffo. On July 2, 1989, he made a sole appearance for World Championship Wrestling (WCW) as part of the "Great American Bash" tour, defeating Trent Knight. Peterson then wrestled for Stu Hart's Stampede Wrestling, where he feuded with Larry Cameron over the Stampede Wrestling North American Heavyweight Championship.

Peterson returned to the AWA full-time in February 1990. At SuperClash IV on April 8, he teamed with Brad Rheingans in a losing effort against the Texas Hangmen. Shortly thereafter, he formed a tag team with The Trooper, defeating The Destruction Crew (Mike Enos and Wayne Bloom) on August 11 to win the AWA World Tag Team Championship. In January 1991, Pro Wrestling Illustrated and its sister publications withdrew recognition of the AWA's World Championship status, but continued to recognize Trooper and Peterson as incumbent "AWA Tag Team Champions" until the promotion finally closed later that year. His last known wrestling appearance was for the debut show of Piledriver Promotions on December 28 of that year, teaming with Steve Ray in a loss to John Tatum and Rod Price.

== Death ==
On May 25, 1993, Peterson crashed his 1980 Honda motorcycle eastbound on U.S. 136 at about 6:40 a.m. onto the side of a tractor-trailer. The impact knocked Peterson back about 40 feet (12 m), instantly killing him at the age of 33. He had not been wearing an approved helmet at the time. Peterson had been working in construction for Koch Pipeline Company.

== Championships and accomplishments ==
- American Wrestling Association
  - AWA World Tag Team Championship (1 time) - with The Trooper
- Central States Wrestling
  - NWA Central States Heavyweight Championship (2 times)
  - NWA Central States Tag Team Championship (1 time) - with Todd Champion
- Texas All-Star Wrestling
  - TASW Six-Man Tag Team Championship (1 time) - with Paul Diamond & Shawn Michaels
- World Class Championship Wrestling
  - WCCW Television Championship (1 time)
- Pro Wrestling Illustrated
  - PWI ranked him # 205 of the 500 best singles wrestlers of the PWI 500 in 1991

== See also ==
- List of premature professional wrestling deaths
