= Super Ninja =

Super Ninja may refer to:

Wrestlers

- Shunji Takano, in AWA, SCW, NCW, and WWE
- Keiji Mutoh
- Rip Oliver
- Ron Reis, briefly known as Super Giant Ninja in WCW
- Hiroshi Yagi, in UWF

Others

- The Super Ninja, a 1984 film starring Alexander Lou
- Super Ninja, a villain in the Chuck Norris: Karate Kommandos television series
- “Super Ninja” the Ellipse Technical Admins AKA Amundson duo

== See also ==
- Super Ninja Boy, a computer game
