= Black Assassin =

Black Assassin or The Black Assassin may refer to:

- Bill Tabb, retired American professional wrestler
- David Hart Smith, Canadian professional wrestler
- Black Assassin (comics), a DC Comics character
- Rice Shower, a Japanese Thoroughbred racehorse.
