= NWA Central States Tag Team Championship =

Professional wrestling tag team championship

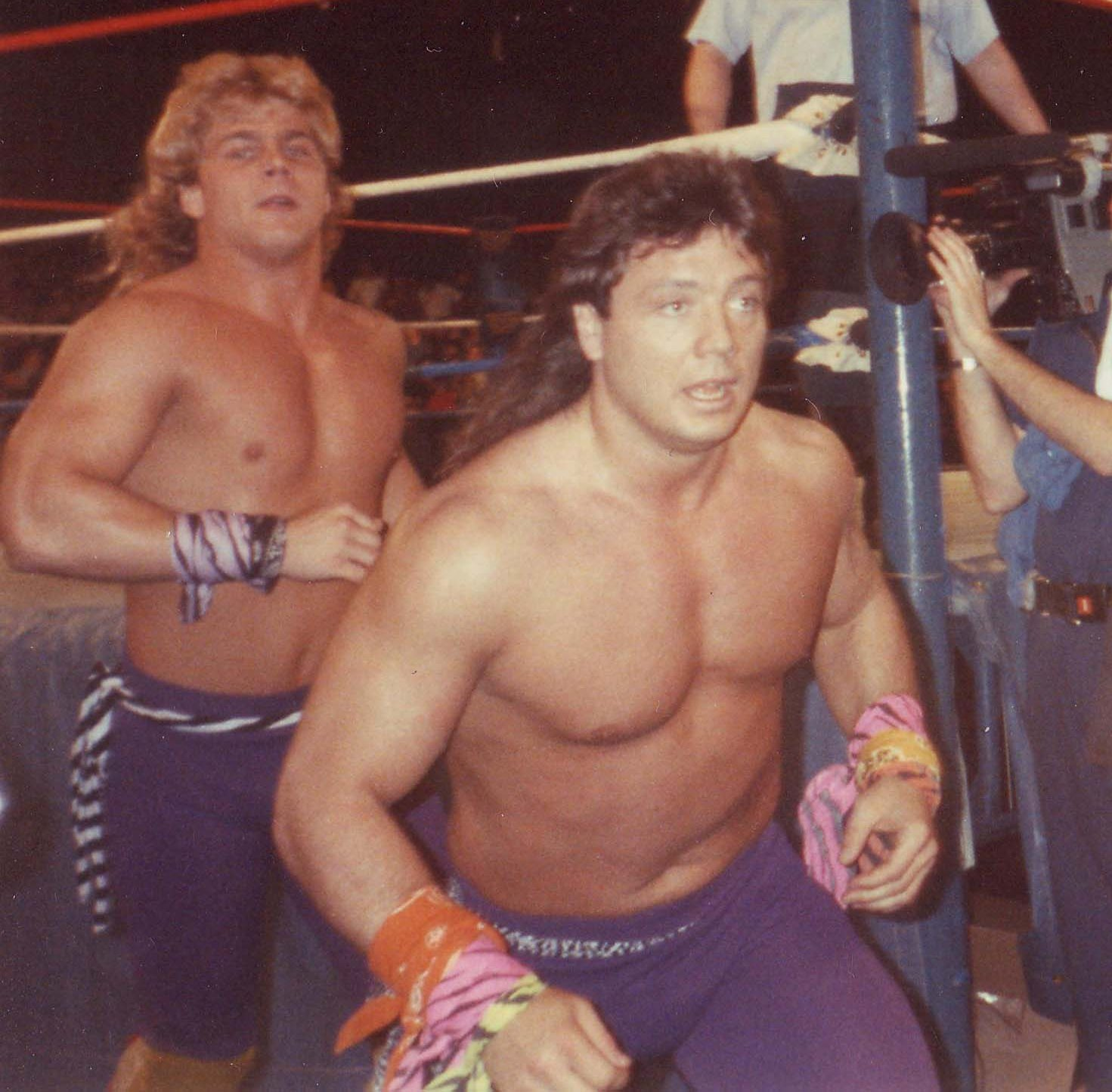
- The Midnight Rockers (Shawn Michaels (left) and Marty Jannetty (right)), held the championship in 1985.

Details
- Promotion: Heart of America Sports Attractions / Central States Wrestling
- Date established: 1961
- Date retired: 1988
Statistics
- First champions: The Medics (Medic #1 and Medic #2)
- Final champions: Rick Patterson and Stevie Ray
- Most reigns: As a team: The Batten Twins (4 reigns); As an individual: "Bulldog" Bob Brown (9 reigns)
- Longest reign: "Bulldog" Bob Brown and Marty Jannetty (249 days)
- Shortest reign: "Bulldog" Bob Brown and Pat O'Connor (3 days) (Note: This is the shortest confirmed reign.)

The NWA Central States Tag Team Championship was the primary tag team championship for the Heart of America Sports Attractions / Central States Wrestling promotion from 1979 until the promotion ceased to exist in 1988. The Central States Tag Team Championship had originally existed for a brief period of time in 1961, but its glory days date from 1979 to 1988, where it replaced the Central States version of the NWA World Tag Team Championship. Because the championship is a professional wrestling championship, it is not won or lost competitively but instead by the decision of the bookers of a wrestling promotion. The championship is awarded after the chosen team "wins" a match to maintain the illusion that professional wrestling is a competitive sport.

A total of 80 wrestler have combined in 55 different teams have held the NWA Central States Tag Team Championship for a total of 68 reigns. Central States booker "Bulldog" Bob Brown has held the championship the most times, nine times with seven different partners. The Batten Twins (Brad and Bart Batten) is the team to have held the championship the most times as a team with four title reigns to their credit. Bob Brown's combined 528 days is the longest combined reigns of any one person and the Batten Twins 292 days is the longest for any team. The longest individual reign was the team of "Bulldog" Bob Brown and Marty Jannetty who held it for 249 days. Due to gaps in documentation it cannot be verified if the three-day reign of Bob Brown and Pat O'Connor is the shortest reign of any champions. (Note: All the statistics are sourced in the championship table.)

== Title history ==
Key
No.	Overall reign number
Reign	Reign number for the specific team—reign numbers for the individuals are in parentheses, if different
Days	Number of days held

No.	Champion	Championship change			Reign statistics		Notes	Ref.
No.	Champion	Date	Event	Location	Reign	Days	Notes	Ref.
A	(Medic #1 (Note: Tony Gonzales) and Medic #2 (Note: Don Lortie))	January 19, 1961	CSW show	Kansas City, Kansas	1	(Note: The date the championship was lost has not been documented which means the championship reign lasted anywhere between 1 day and 131 days)	Defeated Sonny Myers and John Paul Henning in 8-team tournament final to become first champions.	
B	Bulldog Austin and Tarzan Kowalski	1961	CSW show	N/A	1	(Note: The date the titles were won and lost has not been documented which means the championship reign lasted anywhere between 1 day and 2,322 days)		
C	Bulldog Austin (2) and Don McClarity	May 1961	CSW show	N/A	1	(Note: The date the titles were won and lost has not been documented which means the championship reign lasted anywhere between 31 days and 91 days)	Tarzan Kowalski left the promotion, forcing them to award the championship to Don McClarity	
D	Sonny Myers and Bobby Graham	July 1961	N/A	Kansas City, Kansas	1	(Note: The date the titles were won and the date the championship was abandoned have not been documented, making the length of the reign impossible to calculate.)		
—	Deactivated	N/A	—	—	—	—		
1	Bryan St. John and Randy Alls	February 26, 1979	CSW show	Wichita, Kansas	1	(Note: The date the titles were lost has not been documented which means the championship reign lasted anywhere between 3 days and 33 days)	Winners of a tournament for the vacant championship.	
2	Jerry Brown and Hartford Love	March 1979	CSW show	(Note: The location of the match was not captured as part of the championship documentation.)	1	(Note: The date the titles were won has not been documented which means the championship reign lasted anywhere between 47 days and 77 days)		
3	Bryan St. John (2) and Bill Irwin	May 17, 1979	CSW show	Wichita, Kansas	1	(Note: The date the titles were lost has not been documented which means the championship reign lasted anywhere between 1 day and 56 days)		
—	Vacated	1979	—	—	—	—		
4	Jerry Brown (2) and The Turk	July 12, 1979	CSW show	Kansas City, Kansas	1	30	Defeated "Bulldog" Bob Brown and Gama Singh in tournament final.	
5	"Bulldog" Bob Brown	August 11, 1979	CSW show	Des Moines, Iowa	1	(Note: The date the titles were lost has not been documented which means the championship reign lasted anywhere between 1 day and 142 days)		
—	Vacated	1979	—	—	—	—	It is not clear why the championship was vacated	
6	Bruiser Brody and Ernie Ladd	February 3, 1980	CSW show	Kansas City, Kansas	1	46	Defeated Ted and Jerry Oates in a tournament final.	
7	"Bulldog" Bob Brown (2) and Dick Murdoch	March 20, 1980	CSW show	Kansas City, Kansas	1	28		
8	Takachiho and Pak Song	April 17, 1980	CSW show	Kansas City, Kansas	1	62		
9	"Bulldog" Bob Brown (3) and Pat O'Connor	June 18, 1980	CSW show	Des Moines, Iowa	1	3		
10	Takachiho (2) and Killer Karl Kox	June 21, 1980	CSW show	Kansas City, Kansas	1	54		
11	Takachiho (3) and Rufus R. Jones	August 14, 1980	CSW show	Kansas City, Kansas	1	77	Killer Karl Kox left the promotion which awarded the championship to Rufus R. Jones instead.	
12	Mike George and Bob Sweetan	October 30, 1980	CSW show	Kansas City, Kansas	1	(Note: The date the titles were lost has not been documented which means the championship reign lasted anywhere between 1 day and 62 days)		
13	Jerry Roberts and Bruce Reed	1980	CSW show		1	(Note: The date the titles were won or lost has not been documented which means the championship reign lasted anywhere between 1 day and 92 days)		
14	The Kelly Twins (Pat and Mike)	January 1981	CSW show		1	(Note: The date the titles were won has not been documented which means the championship reign lasted anywhere between 68 days and 98 days)		
15	"Bulldog" Bob Brown (4) and Terry Taylor	April 9, 1981	CSW show	Kansas City, Kansas	1	(Note: The date the titles were lost has not been documented which means the championship reign lasted anywhere between 1 day and 57 days)		
—	Vacated	1981	—	—	—	—	Championship was vacated when Terry Taylor left the promotion.	
16	Bob Sweetan (2) and Terry Gibbs	June 6, 1981	CSW show	Kansas City, Kansas	1	82	Defeated the Freebirds (Terry Gordy and Michael Hayes) in a tournament final.	
17	Buzz Tyler and J. J. Dillon	August 27, 1981	CSW show	Kansas City, Kansas	1	(Note: The date the titles were lost has not been documented which means the championship reign lasted anywhere between 35 days and 65 days)		
18	Rufus R. Jones (2) and Dewey Robertson	October 1981 (NLT)	CSW show		1	(Note: The date the titles were won and lost has not been documented which means the championship reign lasted anywhere between 1 day and 91 days)	Defeated Bob Sweetan and Jerry Brown in tournament final.	
19	Jerry Brown (3) and Ron McFarlane	1981	CSW show		1	(Note: The date the titles were won has not been documented which means the championship reign lasted anywhere between 14 days and 104 days)		
20	Ricky Romero and "Hot Stuff" Eddie Gilbert	January 14, 1982	CSW show	Kansas City, Kansas	1	11		
21	Roger Kirby and Jerry Valiant	January 25, 1982	CSW show	Wichita, Kansas	1	(Note: The date the titles were lost has not been documented which means the championship reign lasted anywhere between 35 days and 58 days)		
22	Dewey Robertson (2) and Steve Regal	March 1982	CSW show		1	(Note: The date the titles were won has not been documented which means the championship reign lasted anywhere between 1 day and 24 days)		
23	Roger Kirby and Jerry Valiant	March 25, 1982	CSW show	Kansas City, Kansas	2	(Note: The date the titles were lost has not been documented which means the championship reign lasted anywhere between 1 day and 6 days)		
24	Dewey Robertson (3) and Steve Regal	March 1982	CSW show		2	(Note: The date the titles were won and lost has not been documented which means the championship reign lasted anywhere between 31 days and 66 days)		
25	Jerry Brown (4) and Roger Kirby (3)	May 1982 (NLT)	CSW show		1	(Note: The date the titles were won has not been documented which means the championship reign lasted anywhere between 3 days and 33 days)	Took place on either May 8 or May 15.	
26	Mike George (2) and Mark Romero	June 3, 1982	CSW show	Kansas City, Kansas	1	(Note: The date the titles were lost has not been documented which means the championship reign lasted anywhere between 59 days and 76 days)		
27	Dewey Robertson (4) and Hercules Hernandez	August 1982 (NLT)	CSW show		1	(Note: The date the titles were won has not been documented which means the championship reign lasted anywhere between 1 day and 18 days)		
28	Mike George (3) and Mark Romero	August 19, 1982	CSW show	Kansas City, Kansas	2	42		
29	Dewey Robertson (5) and Hercules Hernandez	N/A	CSW show	Kansas City, Kansas	2			
30	"Bulldog" Bob Brown (5) and Buzz Tyler (2)	N/A	CSW show	Kansas City, Kansas	1			
31	Yasuyuki Fuji and Kim Duk	March 3, 1983	CSW show	Kansas City, Kansas	1	(Note: The date the titles were lost has not been documented which means the championship reign lasted anywhere between 59 days and 82 days)		
—	Vacated	May 1983	—	—	—	—	Championship vacated when Kim Duk left the promotion.	
32	"Bulldog" Bob Brown (6) and Buzz Tyler (3)	May 26, 1983	CSW show	Kansas City, Kansas	2	63	Won a tournament for the vacant championship.	
33	The Sheiks (Roger Kirby (4) and Abdullah the Great)	July 28, 1983	CSW show		1	(Note: The date the titles were lost has not been documented which means the championship reign lasted anywhere between 4 days and 33 days)		
34	George Wells and Ron Ritchie	August 1983	CSW show		1	(Note: The date the titles were won and lost has not been documented which means the championship reign lasted anywhere between 1 day and 30 days)		
35	The Sheiks (Roger Kirby (5) and Abdullah the Great)	August 1983	CSW show		2	(Note: The date the titles were won has not been documented which means the championship reign lasted anywhere between 22 days and 51 days)		
36	"Bulldog" Bob Brown (7) and Buzz Tyler (4)	September 22, 1983	CSW show	Kansas City, Kansas	3	(Note: The date the titles were lost has not been documented which means the championship reign lasted anywhere between 70 days and 100 days)		
—	Vacated	December 1983	—	—	—	—	Brown was injured by 666. Tyler and King Cobra wrestled Tully Blanchard and Ron Starr for the title on January 5, 1984, but the match ended in a Double disqualification.	
37	The Grapplers (Len Denton and Tony Anthony)	March 29, 1984	CSW show	Kansas City, Kansas	1	7	Defeated Ted and Jerry Oates in a tournament final, but the title was held up because Grapplers used a loaded boot during the match.	
38	Jerry and Ted Oates	April 5, 1984	CSW show	Kansas City, Kansas	2	7	Defeated the Grapplers in a rematch.	
39	The Grapplers (Len Denton and Tony Anthony)	April 12, 1984	CSW show	Kansas City, Kansas	2	70		
40	The Uptown Boys (Marty Jannetty and Tommy Rogers)	N/A	CSW show	Kansas City, Kansas	1			
41	The Grapplers (Len Denton and Tony Anthony)	N/A	CSW show	Kansas City, Kansas	3			
42	The Uptown Boys (Marty Jannetty and Tommy Rogers)	N/A	CSW show	Kansas City, Kansas	2			
43	Mr. Pogo and Gypsy Joe	October 11, 1984	CSW show	Kansas City, Kansas	1	59		
44	"Bulldog" Bob Brown (8) and Marty Jannetty (3)	December 9, 1984	CSW show	Des Moines, Iowa	1	249		
—	Vacated	August 15, 1985	—	—	—	—	Brown and Jannetty split after Brown refused to tag in during a match against the Batten Twins.	
45	The Batten Twins (Brad and Bart Batten)	November 21, 1985	CSW show	Kansas City, Kansas	1	91	Defeated The Midnight Express (Dennis Condrey and Bobby Eaton) in a tournament final	
—	Vacated	February 20, 1986	—	—	—	—	Championship held-up after an inconclusive match against Akio Sato and Sheik Abdullah in Kansas City, Kansas.	
46	The Batten Twins (Brad and Bart Batten)	May 1986 (NLT)	CSW show		2	(Note: The date the titles were won has not been documented which means the championship reign lasted anywhere between 1 day and 13 days)	Regained the championship by defeating Akio Sato and Sheik Abdullah	
47	The Midnight Rockers (Marty Jannetty (4) and Shawn Michaels)	May 15, 1986	CSW show	Kansas City, Kansas	1	7		
48	The Batten Twins (Brad and Bart Batten)	May 22, 1986	CSW show	Kansas City, Kansas	3	7		
49	Hacksaw Higgins and J.R. Hogg	May 29, 1986	CSW show	Kansas City, Kansas	1	17		
50	Rufus R. Jones and Mike George (4)	June 15, 1986	CSW show	Sedalia, Missouri	1	11		
51	Bobby Jaggers and Moondog Moretti	June 26, 1986	CSW show	Kansas City, Kansas	1	35		
52	Joe Lightfoot and Billy Two Eagles	July 31, 1986	CSW show	Kansas City, Kansas	1	42		
53	The Thunderfoots (Thunderfoot 1 and Thunderfoot 2)	September 11, 1986	CSW show	Kansas City, Kansas	1	57		
54	Todd Champion and Dave Peterson	November 7, 1986	CSW show	Kansas City, Kansas	1	56		
55	The MOD Squad (Basher and Spike)	January 2, 1987	CSW show	Kansas City, Kansas	1	56		
56	Rick McCord and Bart Batten (4)	February 27, 1987	CSW show	Kansas City, Kansas	1	35		
—	Vacated	April 3, 1987	—	—	—	—	Championship held up after a match against Porkchop Cash and Ken Timbs after Cash used a foreign object to win the match.	
57	Porkchop Cash and Ken Timbs	April 10, 1987	CSW show	Kansas City, Kansas	1	(Note: The date the titles were lost has not been documented which means the championship reign lasted anywhere between 21 days and 51 days)	Defeated McCord and Batten in rematch for the championship	
—	Vacated	May 1987	—	—	—	—	Championship vacated when Ken Timbs left the area.	
58	The Warlord and Karl Kovac	June 8, 1987	CSW show	Wichita, Kansas	1	(Note: The date the titles were won/lost has not been documented which means the championship reign lasted anywhere between 1 day and 22 days)	Won a tournament for the vacant championship	
59	Brad Batten (4) and Bobby Jaggers	June 1987	CSW show		1	(Note: The date the titles were won has not been documented which means the championship reign lasted anywhere between 37 days and 58 days)	The team was awarded the championship when the Warlord left to work in Japan and Kovac was fired.	
60	The Batten Twins (Brad (5) and Bart Batten(5))	August 6, 1987	CSW show	Kansas City, Kansas	4	95	Brad defeated Bobby Jaggers after team splits to claim the title for himself and his brother.	
61	Porkchop Cash and Rick McCord	November 9, 1987	CSW show	Versailles, Missouri	1	17		
62	The Montana Cowboys (Mike Stone and Rick Patterson)	November 26, 1987	CSW show	Kansas City, Kansas	1	(Note: The date the titles were lost has not been documented which means the championship reign lasted anywhere between 36 days and 66 days)		
—	Vacated	January 1988	—	—	—	—	Championship vacated when Mike Stone left the promotion.	
63	"Bulldog" Bob Brown (9) and Cuban Assassin #2	February 6, 1988	CSW show	St. Joseph, Missouri	1	40	Defeated Rick Patterson and Steve Ray in tournament final for the championship.	
64	Rick Patterson (2) and Stevie Ray	March 17, 1988	CSW show	Kansas City, Kansas	1	(Note: The date the titles were abandoned has not been documented which means the championship reign lasted anywhere between 15 days and 44 days)		
—	Deactivated	1988	—	—	—	—	Promotion withdraws from NWA and closes	

== Team reigns by combined length ==
Key

Symbol	Meaning
¤	The exact length of at least one title reign is uncertain, so the shortest possible length is used.

Rank	Team	No. of Reigns	Combined Days
1	The Batten Twins (Brad and Bart Batten)	4	292
2	"Bulldog" Bob Brown and Buzz Tyler	3	260
3	"Bulldog" Bob Brown and Marty Jannetty	1	249
4	The Grapplers' (Len Denton and Tony Anthony)	3	105
5	Mike George and Mark Romero	2	101
6	Bulldog Austin and Don McClarity	1	91¤
7	The Uptown Boys' (Marty Jannetty and Tommy Rogers)	2	84
8	Bob Sweetan and Terry Gibbs	1	82
9	Takachiho and Rufus R. Jones	1	77
10	The Kelly Twins (Pat and Mike)	1	68¤
11	Takachiho and Pak Song	1	62
12	Yasuyuki Fuji and Kim Duk	1	59¤
13	Mr. Pogo and Gypsy Joe	1	59
14	The Thunderfoots' (Thunderfoot 1 and Thunderfoot 2)	1	57
15	The MOD Squad' (Basher and Spike)	1	56
16	Todd Champion and Dave Peterson	1	56
17	Takachiho and Killer Karl Kox	1	54
18	Dewey Robertson and Hercules Hernandez	2	53¤
19	Jerry Brown and Hartford Love	1	47¤
20	Bruiser Brody and Ernie Ladd	1	46
21	Joe Lightfoot and Billy Two Eagles	1	42
22	"Bulldog" Bob Brown and Cuban Assassin #2	1	40
23	Brad Batten and Bobby Jaggers	1	37¤
24	Roger Kirby and Jerry Valiant	2	36¤
25	The Montana Cowboys' (Mike Stone and Rick Patterson)	1	36¤
26	Buzz Tyler and J. J. Dillon	1	35¤
27	Bobby Jaggers and Moondog Moretti	1	35
28	Rick McCord and Bart Batten	1	35
29	Dewey Robertson and Steve Regal	2	32¤
30	Jerry Brown and The Turk	1	30
31	"Bulldog" Bob Brown and Dick Murdoch	1	28
32	The Sheiks' (Roger Kirby and Abdullah the Great)	2	26¤
33	Porkchop Cash and Ken Timbs	1	21¤
34	Porkchop Cash and Rick McCord	1	17
35	Hacksaw Higgins and J.R. Hogg	1	17
36	Jerry Brown and Ron McFarlane	1	15¤
37	Rick Patterson and Stevie Ray	1	15¤
38	Ricky Romero and "Hot Stuff" Eddie Gilbert	1	11
39	Rufus R. Jones and Mike George	1	11
40	The Midnight Rockers' (Marty Jannetty and Shawn Michaels)	1	7
41	Jerry and Ted Oates	1	7
42	Bryan St. John and Randy Alls	1	3¤
43	Jerry Brown and Roger Kirby	1	3¤
44	"Bulldog" Bob Brown and Pat O'Connor	1	3
45	Bulldog Austin and Tarzan Kowalski	1	1¤
46	"Bulldog" Bob Brown and Gama Singh	1	1¤
47	"Bulldog" Bob Brown and Terry Taylor	1	1¤
48	Mike George and Bob Sweetan	1	1¤
49	Rufus R. Jones and Dewey Robertson	1	1¤
50	The Medics (Medic #1 and Medic #2)	1	1¤
51	Sonny Myers and Bobby Graham	1	1¤
52	Jerry Roberts and Bruce Reed	1	1¤
53	Bryan St. John and Bill Irwin	1	1¤
54	The Warlord and Karl Kovac	1	1¤
55	George Wells and Ron Ritchie	1	1¤

== Individual reigns by combined length ==
Key

Symbol	Meaning
¤	The exact length of at least one title reign is uncertain, so the shortest possible length is used.

Rank	Wrestler	No. of Reigns	Combined Days
1	"Bulldog" Bob Brown	9	582¤
2	Marty Jannetty	4	340
3	Brad Batten	5	329
4	Bart Batten	5	327
5	Buzz Tyler	4	295¤
6	Takachiho	3	193
7	Mike George	4	113¤
8	Tony Anthony	3	105
9	Len Denton	3	105
10	Mark Romero	2	101
11	Jerry Brown	4	95¤
12	Bulldog Austin	2	92¤
13	Don McClarity	1	91¤
14	Rufus R. Jones	3	89¤
15	Dewey Robertson	5	86¤
16	Tommy Rogers	2	84
17	Terry Gibbs	1	82
18	Bob Sweetan	1	82
19	Mike Kelly	1	68¤
20	Pat Kelly	1	68¤
21	Pak Song	1	62
22	Kim Duk	1	59¤
23	Yasuyuki Fuji	1	59¤
24	Gypsy Joe	1	59
25	Mr. Pogo	1	59
26	Thunderfoot 1	1	57
27	Thunderfoot 2	1	57
28	Basher	1	56
29	Todd Champion	1	56
30	Dave Peterson	1	56
31	Spike	1	56
32	Killer Karl Kox	1	54
33	Hercules Hernandez	2	53¤
34	Rick McCord	2	52
35	Rick Patterson	2	51¤
36	Hartford Love	1	47¤
37	Bruiser Brody	1	46
38	Ernie Ladd	1	46
39	Joe Lightfoot	1	42
40	Billy Two Eagles	1	42
41	Cuban Assassin #2	1	40
42	Porkchop Cash	2	38¤
43	Bobby Jaggers	2	72¤
44	Roger Kirby	5	36¤
45	Mike Stone	1	36¤
46	Jerry Valiant	2	36¤
47	J. J. Dillon	1	35¤
48	Moondog Moretti	1	35
49	Steve Regal	2	32¤
50	The Turk	1	30
51	Dick Murdoch	1	28
52	Abdullah the Great	2	26¤
53	Ken Timbs	1	21¤
54	Hacksaw Higgins	1	17
55	J.R. Hogg	1	17
56	Ron McFarlane	1	15¤
57	Stevie Ray	1	15¤
58	"Hot Stuff" Eddie Gilbert	1	11
59	Ricky Romero	1	11
60	Shawn Michaels	1	7
61	Jerry Oates	1	7
62	Ted Oates	1	7
63	Bryan St. John	2	4¤
64	Randy Alls	1	3¤
65	Pat O'Connor	1	3
66	Bobby Graham	1	1¤
67	Bill Irwin	1	1¤
68	Karl Kovac	1	1¤
69	Tarzan Kowalski	1	1¤
70	Medic #1	1	1¤
71	Medic #2	1	1¤
72	Sonny Myers	1	1¤
73	Bruce Reed	1	1¤
74	Ron Ritchie	1	1¤
75	Jerry Roberts	1	1¤
76	Gama Singh	1	1¤
77	Bob Sweetan	1	1¤
78	Terry Taylor	1	1¤
79	The Warlord	1	1¤
80	George Wells	1	1¤

== See also ==
- National Wrestling Alliance
- Central States Wrestling
- NWA World Tag Team Championship (Central States version)
