= GWF Television Championship =

Professional wrestling championship

Details
- Promotion: Global Wrestling Federation
- Date established: June 29, 1991
- Date retired: September 21, 1994
Statistics
- First champion(s): The Patriot
- Most reigns: Eddie Gilbert (2 reigns)
- Longest reign: Eddie Gilbert (105 days)
- Shortest reign: The Patriot (55 days)

The GWF Television Championship was a secondary title in the Global Wrestling Federation in Texas. The title existed from 1991 until 1993, when it was abandoned. The title was defended on the promotion's show that aired nationally on ESPN.

== Title history ==
Key
No.	Overall reign number
Reign	Reign number for the specific champion
Days	Number of days held
N/A	Unknown information
†	Championship change is unrecognized by the promotion

No.	Champion	Championship change			Reign statistics		Notes	Ref.
No.	Champion	Date	Event	Location	Reign	Days	Notes	Ref.
1	The Patriot	June 29, 1991	House show	Dallas, Texas	1	55	Defeated Buddy Landel in tournament final.	
—	Vacated	August 23, 1991	—	—	—	—	The Patriot vacates the championship when he won the GWF North American Heavyweight Championship.	
2	Eddie Gilbert	October 4, 1991	House show	Dallas, Texas	1	105	Defeated The Handsome Stranger in tournament final.	
—	Vacated	January 17, 1992	—	—	—	—	Held up after match against Terry Simms	
3	Eddie Gilbert	January 24, 1992	House show	Dallas, Texas	2	56	Won the rematch.	
—	Vacated	March 20, 1992	—	—	—	—	Title vacated after Eddie Gilbert hit referee Sam Esposito.	
4	Sam Houston	April 3, 1992	House show	Dallas, Texas	1	(Note: The exact date the championship was vacated is unclear, putting the championship reign at between 120 and 147 days.)	Won a battle royal.	
—	Vacated	August 1992	—	—	—	—	Title vacated for undocumented reasons	
5	Michael Worthington Davis III	August 28, 1992	House show	Dallas, Texas	1	91	Defeated Midnight Rider.	
6	Manny Villalobos	November 27, 1992	House show	Dallas, Texas	1	(Note: The exact date the GWF stopped promotion the Television Championship is unclear which means that this title reign lasted somewhere between 35 and 399 days.)		
—	Deactivated	September 21, 1994	—	—	—	—	Title abandoned	

== Tournaments ==
=== June 1991 ===
The GWF Television Championship Tournament was a twenty-four man tournament for the inaugural GWF Television Championship held on June 29 and June 30, 1991. The Patriot defeated Buddy Landel in the final to win the tournament.

First Round
The Patriot
Stan Lane
Bill Irwin
El Fantasma
Randy Rhodes
Sweet Daddy Falcone
Billy Black
Brian Adias
Doug Somers
Chris Walker
The Hitman
Rip Rogers
Makhan Singh
Terry Daniels
The Zebra Kid
Terry Garvin
Adrian Street
Axl Rotten
Rasta the Voodoo Man
Jeff Gaylord
Buddy Landell
Gary Young
Nick Busick
Jimmy James
BYE
BYE
BYE
BYE
BYE
BYE

Second Round
The Patriot
Bill Irwin
Randy Rhodes
Billy Black
Chris Walker
Rip Rogers
Makhan Singh
Terry Garvin
Adrian Street
Rasta the Voodoo Man
Buddy Landell
Nick Busick
BYE
BYE
BYE
BYE

Quarter Finals
The Patriot
Billy Black
Chris Walker
Makhan Singh
Adrian Street
Buddy Landell
BYE
BYE

Semi Finals
The Patriot
Chris Walker
Buddy Landell
BYE

Final
The Patriot
Buddy Landell

=== October 1991 ===
The GWF Television Championship Tournament was a six-man tournament held for the vacated GWF Television Championship on October 4, 1991 after previous champion The Patriot vacated the title upon winning the GWF North American Heavyweight Championship on August 23. Eddie Gilbert won the tournament by defeating Handsome Stranger in the final.

Quarterfinals
Handsome Stranger
Mike Davis
Brian Lee	Draw
The Soultaker
John Tatum
Eddie Gilbert
BYE
BYE

Semifinals
Handsome Stranger
BYE
Eddie Gilbert
BYE

Final
Handsome Stranger
Eddie Gilbert

== See also ==
- Global Wrestling Federation
