= Todd Champion =

American retired professional wrestler (born 1960)

Personal information
- Born: Todd Brafford; September 2, 1960 (age 65) Los Angeles, California, United States

Professional wrestling career
- Ring name(s): KGB; Perro Russo; Todd Champion
- Billed height: 6 ft 6 in (1.98 m)
- Billed weight: 295 lb (134 kg)
- Billed from: "WCW Special Forces"
- Trained by: Nelson Royal; Dusty Rhodes
- Debut: 1986
- Retired: 2002

Todd Brafford (born September 2, 1960) is an American retired professional wrestler, better known by his ring name, Todd Champion. He competed in the Southeastern United States, winning titles in several promotions, including World Championship Wrestling (WCW).

== Professional wrestling career ==
=== National Wrestling Alliance (1986–1988) ===
Champion started wrestling in the NWA's Jim Crockett Promotions in 1986, making his debut in a match against Ivan Koloff on an NWA Worldwide taping that April. He gained his first televised victory only a month later when he pinned The Golden Terror (Thunderfoot) on the May 24 edition of Mid-Atlantic Championship Wrestling. However Champion was used primarily as a jobber, until he was sent to the Central States territory to team with D.J. Peterson to develop his skills. He and Peterson captured the NWA Central States Tag Team Championship by defeating The Thunderfoots (Joel Deaton and Dave Deaton) on November 7, 1986. They held the title for almost two months before dropping it to The MOD Squad (Mack and James Jefferson) on January 2, 1987.

Champion made a full-time return to Jim Crockett Promotions in April 1987. He teamed with Denny Brown to defeat The Mulkey Brothers in the first round of the 1987 Crockett Cup. The duo would then lose to Giant Baba & Isao Takagi in the second round. In his second year he experienced more success, winning matches against The Thunderfoots, The Italian Stallion, and John Savage. On June 6, 1987 edition of NWA Pro Champion earned a title shot against NWA Television Champion Tully Blanchard but was unsuccessful. While continuing to be an enhancement talent, Champion teamed frequently with Italian Stallion, Denny Brown, and Lazer Tron throughout the year. He finished his run in November 1987.

=== World Wrestling Federation (1988) ===
On March 9, 1988, Champion wrestled in a dark match at a WWF Superstars of Wrestling taping in Winston-Salem, North Carolina. He defeated Barry Horowitz in the encounter.

=== All Japan Pro Wrestling, and Mexico (1989–1991) ===
In 1989, Champion wrestled in Japan for All Japan Pro Wrestling. He made his debut on August 19, 1989 when he teamed with Terry Gordy in an unsuccessful effort against The Great Kabuki & Yoshiaki Yatsu. Ten days later he and Gordy defeated John Tenta & Shunji Takano. Champion then wrestled in Mexico as KGB, where he continued to develop his skills.

=== World Championship Wrestling (1991–1992) ===
A now seasoned Todd Champion returned to the United States in July 1991 and formed a tag team called The Patriots with Firebreaker Chip in World Championship Wrestling. They were billed as hailing from "WCW Special Forces", with Todd Champion wearing military fatigues and Firebreaker Chip wearing a fireman's helmet and coat. The team was initially supposed to also include an astronaut and policeman character. They feuded with The Fabulous Freebirds and The Young Pistols. The Patriots won the WCW United States Tag Team Championship by defeating the Freebirds on August 12, 1991 and defended the title before losing it to the Young Pistols on November 5. The team disbanded and Champion left the promotion after facing The Super Invader (Hercules Hernandez) at WrestleWar on May 17, 1992.

=== United States Wrestling Association (1992) ===
Champion went to the United States Wrestling Association (USWA), where he feuded with Jerry Lawler over their top title. He won the title, the USWA Unified World Heavyweight Championship by defeating Reed on October 17, 1992. He held the title belt for sixteen days before dropping it to Lawler on November 2.

=== World Wrestling Federation (1993) ===
Champion wrestled a dark match on March 8, 1993, in North Charleston, South Carolina at a WWF Superstars taping, defeating Rikki Nelson.

=== Return to World Championship Wrestling (1993–1994, 1995, 1997) ===
On the November 14, 1993 edition of WCW Main Event Champion made his return to WCW when he defeated Rip Rogers. He was then interviewed by Tony Schiavone, where he challenged WCW Television Champion Lord Steven Regal. The following week he wrestled Regal to a draw. On the November 28 edition Champion then beat Regal by disqualification. The two would have yet another match, this time on the February 12, 1994 edition of WCW Worldwide where Regal finally emerged victorious. He next appeared at Bash at the Beach (1995) when he attempted to save Alex Wright from a postmatch attack by Vader.

On December 15, 1997 Champion reunited with Curtis Thompson for a Monday Nitro dark match against Samula Anoa'i and Sam Fatu (Samoan Swat Team). Now dubbed "The American Patriots", Champion and Thompson emerged victorious.

=== Late career (1995–2002) ===
Champion went on to wrestle in the independent circuit. He also competed in Japan for Michinoku Pro Wrestling under the ring name "Perro Russo". His final match came against Vampiro on July 14, 2002 at an EPIC Pro Wrestling WAR event, after which he retired.

== Championships and accomplishments ==
- Central States Wrestling
  - NWA Central States Tag Team Championship (1 time) - with D.J. Peterson
- United States Wrestling Association
  - USWA Unified World Heavyweight Championship (1 time)
- World Championship Wrestling
  - WCW United States Tag Team Championship (1 time) - with Firebreaker Chip
