= Jumbo Baretta =

American professional wrestler (1967–2026)

Personal information
- Born: Julio Barrera; December 24, 1966 New York City, U.S.
- Died: October 25, 2026 (aged 59) Gainesville, Florida, U.S.

Professional wrestling career
- Ring name(s): Johnny Ballete; Johnny Barrett; Jumbo Baretta; Julio Barrera
- Billed height: 6 ft 5 in (196 cm)
- Billed weight: 375 lb (170 kg)
- Billed from: Tampa, Florida
- Trained by: Boris Malenko
- Debut: 1986
- Retired: 2013

Julio Barrera (December 24, 1966 – October 25, 2026), better known by his ring name Jumbo Baretta, was an American professional wrestler. He is best known for his appearances with Championship Wrestling From Florida and World Championship Wrestling and World Wrestling Federation in the United States and with Pro Wrestling Fujiwara Gumi and the Universal Wrestling Federation in Japan.

== Professional wrestling career ==
Baretta was trained by Boris Malenko and made his professional wrestling debut in 1986. Early in his career he would work for various Florida promotions including Championship Wrestling from Florida and the World Wrestling Council in Puerto Rico. He won the NWA Florida Tag Team Championship with Dennis Knight defeating The Nasty Boys in 1989. They dropped the titles to Lou Perez and Mark Starr a month later.

From 1989 to 1990, Baretta worked for World Championship Wrestling, having matches against Sting (wrestler), Tommy Rich, the Rock 'n' Roll Express, and the Road Warriors.

In 1989, Baretta made his debut in Japan for the MMA-based Universal Wrestling Federation (Japan) promotion as Johnny Barrett.

In 1991, Baretta worked for the newly formed Pro Wrestling Fujiwara Gumi.

In 1995, Baretta worked a couple of matches for the World Wrestling Federation.

In 2010, Baretta won the first Malenko Cup Battle Royal in Riverview, Florida.

Later in his career, he worked for independent promotions in Florida. He wrestled his final match in 2013.

== Championships and accomplishments ==
- Championship Wrestling from Florida
  - CWF Tag Team Championship (1 time) - with Dennis Knight

== Personal life and death ==
Baretta was born in Brooklyn, on December 24, 1966. He died on October 25, 2026, at the age of 59.
