= Lou Perez (wrestler) =

American professional wrestler

Personal information
- Born: November 16 Tampa, Florida, United States

Professional wrestling career
- Ring name: "Lightning" Lou Perez
- Billed height: 6 ft 0 in (1.83 m)
- Billed weight: 223 lb (101 kg)
- Trained by: Boris Malenko
- Debut: 1988
- Retired: 1994

Lou Perez is an American professional wrestler who has competed in North American promotions including the National Wrestling Alliance and World Championship Wrestling during the late 1980s and early 1990s as well as the Puerto Rican-based promotion IWA Puerto Rico.

Although billed as the younger brother of Al Perez, Lou Perez is actually his cousin.

== Career ==
=== Florida Championship Wrestling (1988) ===
Trained by Boris Malenko, Perez began wrestling in Championship Wrestling from Florida in late 1988. His first match came in a losing effort as he teamed with Denny Brown against The Star Riders at an FCW TV taping in Tampa, FL or May 10, 1988. The rookie wrestler then gained his first victory in his very first singles match, defeating Scotty the Body one week later. After going undefeated throughout the summer, Perez would challenge unsuccessfully for the World Class World Light Heavyweight and lose to Eric Embry on July 30, 1988. He later teamed with Rex King and Austin in a 6-man tag team match against Scotty the Body, Bob Cook and Jim Backlund. Briefly appearing in the Professional Wrestling Federation the following year, Perez feuded with PWF Junior Heavyweight Champion Jim Backlund facing him on March 11, 1989.

=== World Championship Wrestling (1989 - 1991, 1994) ===
Lou Perez made his debut in World Championship Wrestling on a house show in Miami, Florida on September 8, 1989 and defeated "Powerhouse" Tim Parker. He defeated Parker the following night in Fort Pierce, FL. Following this brief stint he returned to the Professional Wrestling Federation.

Perez re-entered WCW competition the following year on July 21, defeating Barry Horowitz at a house show in St Petersburg, FL. He made his debut on WCW television on August 10, 1990 defeating Dutch Mantell and was announced to have earned a title shot against NWA World Television Champion Arn Anderson. A day later on NWA Worldwide he defeated Mike Thor On NWA Pro on August 11, 1990 Perez faced Anderson, but was defeated.

He continued to compete in WCW that fall, facing Doom, Dan Spivey, and Sid Vicious, as well as facing Mike Thor and Barry Horowitz in rematches. His final match that year came in a house show match with Buddy Landel in Sunrise, FL on September 30.

The next year Lou Perez would make one appearance in World Championship Wrestling, wrestling Brian Pillman at a house show on November 29, 1991. His final appearance came at a WCW Pro/Worldwide taping on November 10, 1994 when he was defeated by Jean Paul Levesque.

=== Professional Wrestling Federation (1989 - 1994) ===
Perez joined the nascent Professional Wrestling Federation in 1989, which was a reboot of Florida Championship Wrestling under the aegis of Dusty Rhodes. He faced PWF Florida Champion Mike Graham in his first match on March 4, 1989 in Titusville, FL at the PWF The Homecoming event, losing via disqualification. Perez would also feud with PWF Junior Heavyweight Champion Jim Backlund facing him on March 11, 1989. He became a mainstay in the area within several years and later teamed with Mark Starr to defeat Jumbo Baretta & Dennis Knight for the NWA Florida Tag Team Championship in Tampa, Florida, on November 12, 1989.

Feuding with Steve Keirn over the NWA Florida Heavyweight Championship, he defeated Keirn for the title in Winter Haven, Florida, in July 1992. Trading the title with Kiern twice during the next two years, before being forced to surrender the title on November 6, 1995, after suffering a knee injury.

=== Independents (1991 - 1994) ===
He also competed in several other promotions during this time, feuding with the Cuban Assassin while in the World Wrestling Alliance and teamed with Rico Federico to defeat the Southern Posse to win the IPWA Tag Team titles while in the International Pro wrestling Association during early 1994. He also faced the Black Assassin and Hercules in various independent promotions later during the year.

During an interpromotional event between the National Wrestling Alliance and Smoky Mountain Wrestling, he participated in the 1994 NWA World Heavyweight Championship Tournament fighting Osamu Nishimura to a time limit draw in the opening rounds in Cherry Hill, New Jersey, on November 19, 1994.

== Championships and accomplishments ==
- International Pro Wrestling Alliance

- IPWA Tag Team Championship (1 time) with Rico Federico

- Championship Wrestling from Florida

- NWA Florida Heavyweight Championship (3 times)
- NWA Florida Tag Team Championship (6 times) - with Mark Starr

- Pro Wrestling Federation

- PWF Light Heavyweight Championship (1 times)

- Other titles

- FWA Heavyweight Championship (1 time)
- PCWF Heavyweight Championship (1 time)

- Pro Wrestling Illustrated

- PWI ranked him # 180 of the 500 best singles wrestlers of the PWI 500 in 1991
