= Sam Houston (wrestler) =

American professional wrestler (born 1963)

- Houston in 1988

Personal information
- Born: Michael Maurice Smith; October 11, 1963 (age 63) Waco, Texas, U.S.
- Spouses: Nickla Roberts (m. 1986; div. 1994) Kimberly Austin (m. 2021)
- Children: 2
- Parent: Grizzly Smith (father)
- Relatives: Jake Roberts (half-brother); Rockin' Robin (sister)

Professional wrestling career
- Ring name(s): Midnight Rider; Sam Houston
- Billed height: 6 ft 3 in (191 cm)
- Billed weight: 227 lb (103 kg)
- Billed from: Waco, Texas
- Trained by: Grizzly Smith; Dusty Rhodes; Magnum T. A.
- Debut: 1981

Michael Maurice Smith (born October 11, 1963) is an American semi-retired professional wrestler, better known by his ring name, Sam Houston. He is best known for his appearances with the World Wrestling Federation from 1987 to 1991. Houston's father Grizzly Smith was also a professional wrestler, as was his half-brother Jake Roberts and his sister Rockin' Robin.

== Professional wrestling career ==
=== Championship Wrestling from Florida (1983–1985) ===
Houston started wrestling in 1983, initially competing in Championship Wrestling from Florida.

After claiming victories over a few opponents with his finisher bulldog in early 1984, Houston's first big challenge was when he had to team up with Bubba Douglas on Feb.4 against The Assassins. After losing that match, he faced other opponents including Buddy Landel, Ric Flair, Tully Blanchard, Dick Slater, Wahoo McDaniel and Billy Graham.

=== Mid-Atlantic Championship Wrestling (1985–1986) ===
In 1985, he began working for Mid-Atlantic Championship Wrestling. He was billed as a protégé of Dusty Rhodes and Magnum T. A., which made him a target for the Four Horsemen. They finally got to him in the summer of 1985 when Tully Blanchard, Ole Anderson, and Arn Anderson (kayfabe) broke his arm during a six-man tag team match.

In late 1985, he feuded with Krusher Khruschev over the NWA Mid-Atlantic Heavyweight Championship, which he won in January 1986. He then feuded with Black Bart, who won the title from him a few months later.

Houston formed a cowboy-themed tag team with Nelson Royal during the summer of 1986.

=== Central States Wrestling (1986) ===
Houston moved on to the Central States Territory later that year, where he won the title while feuding with Bulldog Bob Brown and Bill Dundee.

=== Universal Wrestling Federation (1987) ===
His first few months of 1987 were spent in the Universal Wrestling Federation where he teamed up with Terry Taylor for a short period of time.

=== World Wrestling Federation (1987–1991) ===
Houston moved on to the WWF in the spring, making his debut on May 9, 1987, by defeating Sika on a house show in St. Louis, Missouri. Houston was undefeated in his first month, defeating Terry Gibbs, Steve Lombardi, and others at TV taping dark matches and arena shows. On June 7 he made his first television appearance, defeating Gibbs on Wrestling Challenge in a match taped in Houston, Texas. At the same event Houston came out to help a newly arrived Ted DiBiase (who had made his first WWF appearance as a babyface) clear the ring of The One Man Gang.

Houston's first loss came a few weeks later when he was defeated by another new arrival, Bam-Bam Bigelow at a house show in Jackson, Mississippi on June 25. One night later in Houston, Texas he tag-teamed with DiBiase against The One Man Gang and Ron Bass. The babyface duo lost when DiBiase turned heel on his partner. Houston remained off US television, wrestling opening matches on house shows against Tiger Chung Lee, Jose Estrada, Barry Horowitz, and others, winning most of these encounters. He finally made his television debut on October 31, 1987, on WWF Superstars when he upset Danny Davis, handing the former referee his first televised loss. He moved into the winter wrestling Outlaw Ron Bass on the house show circuit, with many of the matches ending in draws. In December 1987 he began a series with Danny Davis, trading wins with him on various house show matches in a feud that lasted all the way into June 1988, and would continue sporadically into 1989. During his time in WWF he teamed with fellow cowboy Scott Casey on a number of occasions and a match that included his brother Jake Roberts (though the audience didn't know the relationship at the time), with Houston saving Roberts from elimination on a number of occasions. He wrestled in the first ever Royal Rumble match on January 24, 1988, and two months later made his first pay-per-view appearance when he appeared at WrestleMania IV's twenty man battle royal. That summer Houston entered a house show series with Big Boss Man, but unlike his previous house show series he was winless. Houston also fell in matches against King Haku, Frenchy Martin, and the newly arrived Curt Hennig and Terry Taylor. His biggest win in the summer of 1988 was against Jos LeDuc. He also continued to gain televised victories on Prime Time Wrestling, and was usually successful against lower-level competition such as Steve Lombardi. He formed a short-lived tag team with Hillbilly Jim, including a win over George South and Gene Ligon on the September 13 episode of Prime Time Wrestling. He made his second PPV appearance of the year when he teamed with The Ultimate Warrior, The Blue Blazer (Owen Hart), Jim Brunzell, and Brutus Beefcake in a winning effort against Honky Tonk Man, Greg Valentine, Ron Bass, Bad News Brown, and Danny Davis in the second annual Survivor Series.

Houston defeated Steve Lombardi in the dark match at the 1989 Royal Rumble but was unable to move past lower-level competition. On the February 11th edition of WWF Superstars he lost to The Honky Tonk Man in less than two minutes. After this Houston wrestled primarily on house shows, facing Barry Windham and The Genius. In 1990 he appeared sporadically, although he wrestled Jerry Sags in the dark match of the 1991 Royal Rumble. His final match was against The Barbarian on February 7, 1991, in Salt Lake City, UT.

=== World Championship Wrestling (1991) ===
After continuing to flounder in the WWF's mid-card as a jobber to the stars, Houston left WWF in February 1991 and joined World Championship Wrestling. His first appearance came on April 17 in Gadsden, Alabama when he defeated Jack Victory. On the May 12 edition of WCW Main Event, Houston lost to WCW World Champion Ric Flair. Houston would go on to face The Diamond Studd, Larry Zbyszko, Arn Anderson, and Steve Austin that summer. His final match came on August 11 when he was defeated by The One Man Gang at a house show in Roanoke, Virginia.

=== Global Wrestling Federation (1991–1993) ===
Houston next went to the United States Wrestling Association promotion, which had bought up the World Class Championship Wrestling promotion in Dallas, where he feuded once again with Black Bart. After leaving there he then wrestled on the independent wrestling scene before showing up in January 1992 at the Global Wrestling Federation. His first appearance came on January 3 when he faced Bull Pain. Wrestling as The Midnight Rider he enjoyed greater success, even winning their Television Championship, and teaming with Rockin' Robin and Baby Doll in mixed tag matches against Bull Pain and Samantha Pain.

=== World Championship Wrestling (1993–1994) ===
Houston returned to WCW in the summer of 1993, appearing first at a house show in Burlington, NC in a match against Frankie Lancaster. On September 7 he wrestled in a dark match WCW Saturday Night, teaming with Mark Starr to defeat JD Wolfe and Chick Donovan. In a match taped that night and aired on October 9, 1993, Houston and Starr were defeated by Harlem Heat. A follow-up appearance on October 16, teaming with Pez Whatley against The Nasty Boys. His final appearance would come on September 26, 1994, when he was defeated by The Honky Tonk Man at a WCW Pro taping in Knoxville, TN.

=== Independent circuit (1994–1998, 2007-present) ===
After WCW, Houston worked in the independent circuit until semi-retiring in 1998.

He returned to wrestling on the independent wrestling circuit for GWE, OWE, and others in 2007. Wrestling against some top independent wrestling talent, such as Mike DiBiase. He won the Ark-La-Tex Heavyweight title on November 7, 2015, in Longview, Texas. He is still active on the independent circuit wrestling with the PWA in Ohio and currently holds the heavyweight title which he won in early 2022. He also worked with Bobby Fulton of the Fantastics at his wrestling school in Salisbury, NC and assists several young independent wrestlers with their training.

== Personal life ==
Michael Smith is a second generation professional wrestler, his father being former wrestler Grizzly Smith. His siblings were also wrestlers; his half-brother is Jake "The Snake" Roberts, and his younger sister is Rockin' Robin.

Before his departure from the NWA, Smith had begun dating Tully Blanchard's valet Nickla Roberts, better known by the name Baby Doll. They were married in Lubbock, Texas on July 30, 1986, and went on to have two daughters together, named Mikala Joy and Mikka Tyler (Smith). Roberts chose to devote her time to her new baby girls instead of returning to wrestling. She divorced Houston in 1994, claiming Smith wanted to "be the life of the party".

In August 2005, Smith was sentenced to 10 years in prison for repeated DUI arrests. He had been arrested numerous times before, with his ex-wife Roberts claiming in 2005 that he had an average of two DUI arrests per year for the past ten years before he was sent to prison.

Smith's home near New Orleans was destroyed by Hurricane Katrina. He worked part-time at a construction company, and also helped his father at a cemetery, which is operated by the Firemen's Charitable and Benevolent Association, near the French Quarter in New Orleans.

In 2009 Smith resurfaced on the Louisiana indy scene wrestling for Old School Wrestling Entertainment based in New Orleans and Mid South Wrestling Entertainment in Houma, Louisiana. Smith also opened his own wrestling company called Mid South Entertainment. He ran only one show booking the likes of Rod Price, One Man Gang, and many local wrestlers.

In 2021 he moved back to North Carolina where he has family roots on his mother's side. He is married to Kimberly Austin.

== Championships and accomplishments ==
- Central States Wrestling
  - NWA Central States Heavyweight Championship (1 time)
- Global Wrestling Federation
  - GWF Television Championship (1 time)
- Mid-Atlantic Championship Wrestling
  - NWA Mid-Atlantic Heavyweight Championship (1 time)
- NWA Ark-La-Tx
  - NWA Ark-La-Tex Heavyweight Championship (1 time)
- Pro Wrestling America
  - PWA Tag Team Championship (1 time) – with Charlie Norris
- Virginia Wrestling Association
  - VWA Heavyweight Championship (1 time)
- World Class Wrestling Federation
  - WCWF Heavyweight Championship (1 time)
