= Gene Ligon =

American professional wrestler (born 1950)

Personal information
- Born: Bradford Gene Ligon; October 10, 1950 (age 75) Salisbury, North Carolina, U.S.

Professional wrestling career
- Ring name(s): Gene Ligon; Thunderfoot II; Thunderfoot #2
- Billed height: 6 ft 2 in (1.88 m)
- Billed weight: 253 lb (115 kg; 18.1 st)
- Trained by: Nelson Royal
- Debut: 1976
- Retired: 2005

Bradford Gene Ligon (born October 10, 1950) is an American retired professional wrestler, who worked for Jim Crockett Promotions in the Mid-Atlantic, World Championship Wrestling and World Wrestling Federation in the 1980s.

== Early life ==
Ligon graduated from Gardner Webb College with a Bachelor of Science in 1974.

== Professional wrestling career ==
Ligon made his professional wrestling debut in 1976 for the IWA promotion in Roxboro, North Carolina. He would make his debut for Jim Crockett Promotions. During his time with the company he worked as a jobber.

In 1986, he teamed with Joel Deaton as the Thunderfoots, they moved to the NWA's Central States Wrestling territory and in September 1986 won the tag team titles. On their return to Jim Crockett Promotions the Thunderfoots were used as preliminary wrestlers. Deaton left the team and was replaced by David Isley. The team of Ligon and Isley went to on to win the tag titles in Rob Russen's IWA.

In 1987, Ligon went to Japan to work for All Japan Pro Wrestling for a month and then returned to Crockett Promotions. Ligon stayed with Crockett until leaving in October 1988 before Ted Turner bought the promotion and changed its name to World Championship Wrestling that November.

From 1988 to 1989, Ligon worked for the World Wrestling Federation.

In September 1989, Ligon would make his debut for World Championship Wrestling. He left WCW in 1990.

During the 1990s, Ligon worked in the independents in North Carolina until retiring from wrestling in 2005.

== Personal life ==
After wrestling, Ligon became a physical education teacher. Today he teaches Physical Education and Health at Apprentice Academy in North Carolina. Also coaches wrestling, football, and strength training.

He also worked for Topco Marketing. Also owned Fitness Unlimited in 1987 changed name to Your Gym of Concord and expanded to Shelby and Dallas NC the following 4 years.

Today he resides in Concord, North Carolina and is good friends with Nikita Koloff.

== Championships and accomplishments ==
- Central States Wrestling
  - NWA Central States Tag Team Championship (1 time) – with Thunderfoot #1 (Joel Deaton)
- International Wrestling Association
  - IWA Heavyweight Championship (1 time)
  - IWA Tag Team Championship – with David Isley (1 time)
- Pro Wrestling Illustrated
  - PWI ranked him # 393 (Ligon) and # 442 (Thunderfoot #2) of the 500 best singles wrestlers of the PWI 500 in 1991
  - PWI ranked him # 421 (Ligon) and # 450 (Thunderfoot #2) of the 500 best singles wrestlers of the PWI 500 in 1991
- Virginia Wrestling Association
  - VWA Tag Team Championship – with David Isley (1 time)
