= MOD Squad =

Professional wrestling tag team

Tag team
- Members: Jim Jefferson / Spike; Mack Jefferson / Basher
- Name(s): Jeffers; MOD Squad
- Billed from: Anderson, South Carolina
- Debut: 1984
- Disbanded: 1991

The MOD Squad was a professional wrestling tag team that worked together from 1984 to 1991, normally working as heels (wrestling term for those who portray the "bad guys"). The team was made up of brothers James (July 14, 1960 – February 8, 2013) and Mack Jefferson, known under the ring names Mack Jeffers and Jim Jeffers and later on as Spike and Basher respectively. The duo's ring characters was that of two motorcycle police officers.

== Team history ==
Mack and James Jefferson began wrestling in 1984 under the ring names Mack Jeffers and Jim Jeffers working as a regular team from more or less the beginning, billed as "the Jeffers". In 1986 the team decided to change their image, adopting the monikers Spike and Basher, the Mod Squad, a pair of motorcycle police officers, completed with uniforms and motorcycle helmets that the team used to help them win matches, pushing the perception that they were bad guys. The MOD Squad had their first taste of success in the Continental Wrestling Association (CWA) where they were managed by J.D. Costello. On March 24, 1986, the team defeated The Fantastics (Bobby Fulton and Tommy Rogers) to win the AWA Southern Tag Team Championship. The CWA bookers decided to move the tag team championship onto the team of Giant Hillbilly and Jerry Lawler 91 days later on June 23. By the end of the year the MOD Squad had moved on to another territory, working around Kansas City for the Central States Wrestling promotion. On January 1 Spike and Basher became the NWA Central States Tag Team Champions by defeating Dave Peterson and Todd Champion. Their run on top of the tag team division was ended 56 days later as the team of Bart Batten and Ric McCord defeated them. The following month the MOD Squad defeated The Southern Boys (Steve Armstrong and Tracy Smothers) to win the NWA Florida Tag Team Championship. In April, 1987 the MOD Squad were invited to participate in the second annual Jim Crockett, Sr. Memorial Cup Tag Team Tournament, defeating the veteran team of Wahoo McDaniel and Baron von Raschke in the first round, but were defeated by Four Horsemen representatives Lex Luger and Tully Blanchard in the second round. The following week they lost the NWA Florida Tag Team Championship to The Fabulous Ones (Stan Lane and Steve Keirn) on a show in Florida. The MOD Squad challenged the Fabulous Ones for the Florida Tag Team Championship as part of the Eddie Graham Memorial Show on May 9, 1987, but lost. The brothers competed on two of the National Wrestling Alliance The Great American Bash shows in the summer of 1987, first on July 4, 1987, in Atlanta, Georgia Spike and Basher competed in singles matches losing to LazorTron and Jimmy Valiant on undercard matches. 2 weeks later at the July 18 Great American Bash show they were unsuccessful in their challenge for the NWA World Tag Team Championship as they lost to the Rock 'n' Roll Express (Ricky Morton and Robert Gibson. Their last high-profile match took place on February 6, 1990, as part of World Championship Wrestling's Clash of the Champions X: Texas Shootout show where they lost to the team of "Flyin' Brian" Pillman and "Z-Man" Tom Zenk in the second match of the night. Both members of the MOD Squad retired from active competition in 1991.

James "Spike" Jefferson died on February 8, 2013, in Belton, South Carolina, at the age of 52.

== Championships and accomplishments ==
- Championship Wrestling from Florida
  - NWA Florida Tag Team Championship (1 time)
- Central States Wrestling
  - NWA Central States Tag Team Championship (1 time)
- Continental Wrestling Association
  - AWA Southern Tag Team Championship (1 time)
- Independents
  - Atlantic Coast Wrestling Tag Team Championship (1 time)
