= Bill Tabb =

American professional wrestler

Professional wrestling career
- Ring name(s): The Black Assassin; The Black Prince; The Blade Warrior; The Beast; Bill Tabb
- Billed height: 6 ft 2 in (1.88 m)
- Billed weight: 290 lb (130 kg)
- Billed from: Atlanta, Georgia
- Trained by: Oliver Humperdink
- Debut: 1985
- Retired: 1998

Bill Tabb is a retired American professional wrestler, known by his ringname The Black Assassin, who competed in North American regional promotions including the American Wrestling Alliance and National Wrestling Alliance, specifically Florida Championship Wrestling and Jim Crockett Promotions during the 1980s.

== Career ==
=== Jim Crockett Promotions ===
Making his professional debut in 1985, Big Bill Tabb began appearing on Championship Wrestling from Georgia, facing Ron Bass on January 1, 1986. He also teamed with Lee Peek against Baron von Raschke & Shaska Whatley and competed in single matches againts Magnum T. A., Tully Blanchard, Tim Horner and Jimmy Valiant.

The following year, he and The Mulkys lost a handicap match to Vladimir Petrov in his debut match for the promotion on January 3, 1987. After losing to Arn Anderson on January 23, he also lost a 6-man tag team match with Eric Long and Jack Jackson against Big Bubba Rogers and the Midnight Express. He also faced Barry Windham

=== Florida Championship Wrestling ===
In early 1987, he moved to Florida Championship Wrestling as the masked wrestler The Black Assassin managed by Oliver Humperdink. Briefly siding with Dory Funk, Jr. in his feud with Mike Rotunda, he attacked Rotunda after Funk and Rotunda had wrestled to a time limit draw on the 7/04/1987 edition of World Championship Wrestling, and then he teamed with Funk and Oliver Humperdink in a 6-man tag team "Bunkhouse" match against Blackjack Mulligan, Ed "The Bull" Gantner and Bugsy McGraw pinning Mulligan after interference from Kevin Sullivan on July 11, 1987.

Two days later, he and Incubus lost to Ron Simmons and Scott Hall in West Palm Beach, Florida on July 13, 1987.

Teaming with the Samurai Warriors, he lost a 6-man tag team match to Kendall Windham, David Sierra and Nelson Royal on October 18 and, with Kevin Sullivan, lost to Ron Simmons and "Dr. Death" Steve Williams in Atlanta, Georgia on December 6, 1987.

=== Later career ===
Moving on to the American Wrestling Association he participated in a controversial storyline involving Colonel DeBeers in which DeBeers, a pro-apartheid white South African, refused to enter the ring with him and was counted out as a result.

After a brief stint as The Blade Warrior in the Continental Wrestling Association in 1989, he went on to numerous regional and independent promotions wrestling under various names including the Black Prince and The Beast before retiring in 1998.

== Championships and accomplishments ==
- All-State Wrestling
  - ASW Heavyweight Championship (2 times)
- Other titles
  - ICW Southern Heavyweight Championship (1 time)
