= Brett Sawyer =

American professional wrestler (1960–2023)

Personal information
- Born: Brett Eugene Woyan; August 10, 1960 Orlando, Florida, U.S.
- Died: 8 September 2023 (aged 63)
- Family: Buzz Sawyer (brother)

Professional wrestling career
- Ring name(s): Brett Sawyer; Brett Wayne; Brett Wayne Sawyer; The Bubble Gum Kid
- Billed height: 5 ft 9 in (1.75 m)
- Billed weight: 224 lb (102 kg)
- Trained by: Buzz Sawyer; Ricky Steamboat
- Debut: 1976
- Retired: 1998

Brett Eugene Woyan (10 August 1960 – 8 September 2023) was an American professional wrestling trainer and professional wrestler, better known by the ring name Brett Sawyer.

== Early life ==
Woyan grew up in St. Petersburg, Florida. He attended Dixie M. Hollins High School, where he took part in amateur wrestling.

== Professional wrestling career ==
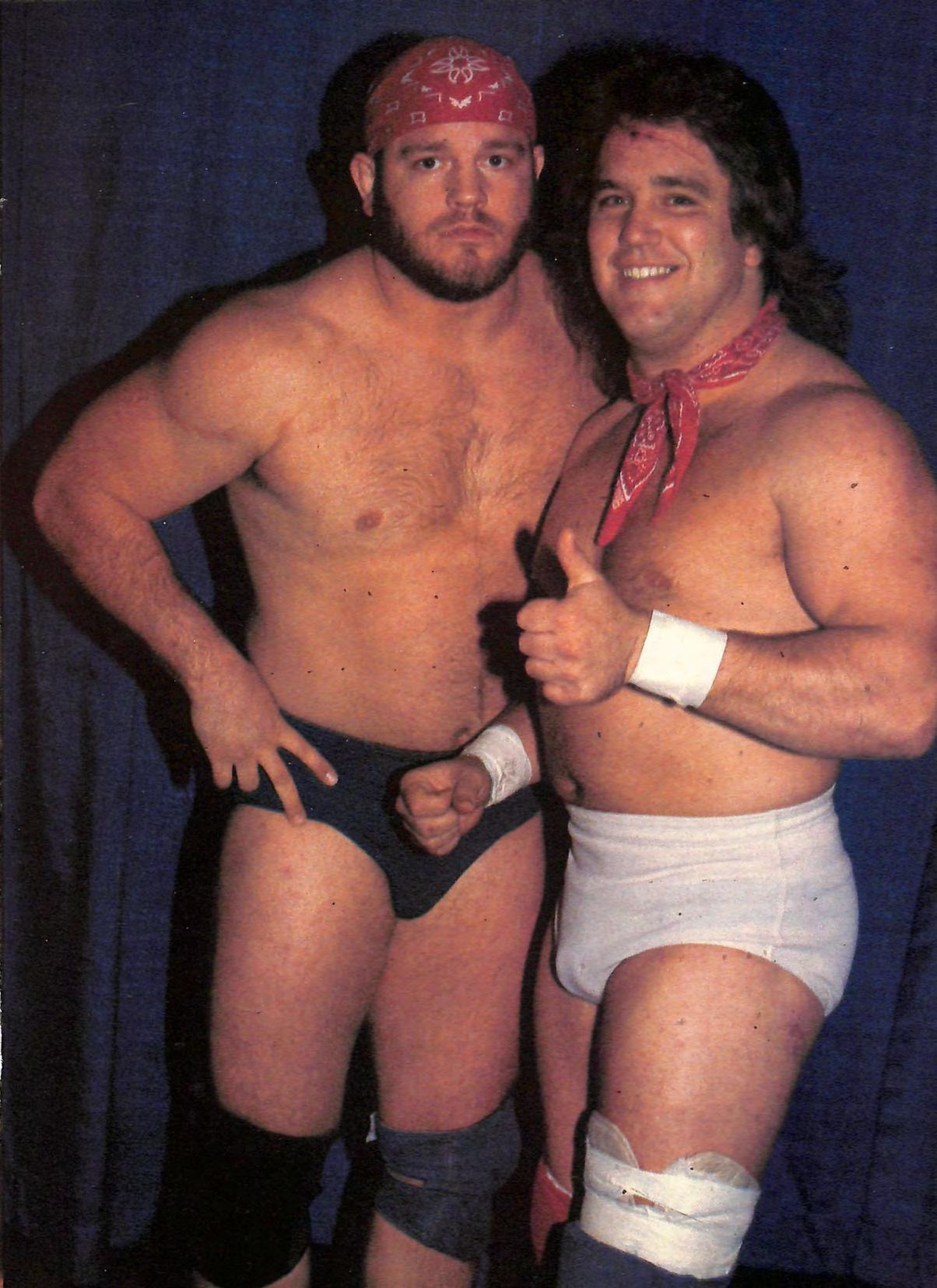
Brett (right) and Buzz Sawyer (left), circa 1980s

Woyan was trained to wrestle by Ricky Steamboat and his elder brother Bruce Woyan, who wrestled as Buzz Sawyer. He debuted in 1976 at the age of 16. Woyan eventually adopted the ring name "Hacksaw" Brett Sawyer and formed a tag team with his brother. In the early 1980s, Sawyer competed for the Portland, Oregon–based Pacific Northwest Wrestling promotion. Between 1982 and 1984, he held the NWA Pacific Northwest Heavyweight Championship four times and the NWA Pacific Northwest Tag Team Championship five times. In 1983 and 1984, the Sawyers competed for the Atlanta, Georgia–based Georgia Championship Wrestling promotion, where they feuded with The Road Warriors, defeating them for the NWA National Tag Team Championship in 1983. Sawyer also won the NWA National Heavyweight Championship in 1983. In 1984, Sawyer wrestled for the San Antonio, Texas–based Southwest Championship Wrestling promotion, winning the SCW Southwest Tag Team Championship with Chicky Starr.

In early 1985, Sawyer began wrestling for the Charlotte, North Carolina–based Jim Crockett Promotions, with he and his brother losing a "loser leaves town" cage match to The Midnight Express in September 1985. In late 1985, he wrestled for the Kansas City, Missouri–based Heart of America Sports Attractions promotion, winning the NWA Central States Heavyweight Championship. Sawyer returned to Jim Crockett Promotions in 1986, competing in the Jim Crockett Sr. Memorial Cup Tag Team Tournament. In 1987, Sawyer and his brother toured Japan with New Japan Pro-Wrestling, competing in the NJPW New Year Dash 1987. In 1989, Sawyer wrestled for Championship Wrestling from Florida, where he teamed with Jim Backlund as "The Playboys". The duo briefly held the NWA Florida Tag Team Championship in the summer of 1989. In the late-1980s, the Sawyer brothers trained Ken Shamrock to wrestle. In 1991, Sawyer wrestled three matches for World Championship Wrestling as "Brett Wayne".

Sawyer retired from professional wrestling in 1998. He opened a professional wrestling school in St. Petersburg, Florida called Mad Dog's Palace School of Professional Wrestling.

== Personal life and death ==
Woyan was married with two children.

Woyan's elder brother, Bruce Alan Woyan, was also a professional wrestler under the ring name Buzz Sawyer. On February 7, 1992, Bruce Woyan died of drug overdose-induced heart failure. Woyan's nephew, Bruce Woyan's son Travis, also wrestled.

Brett Woyan died on 8 September 2023, at the age of 63.

== Championships and accomplishments ==
- Championship Wrestling from Florida
  - NWA Florida Tag Team Championship (1 time) - with Jim Backlund
- Georgia Championship Wrestling
  - NWA National Heavyweight Championship (1 time)
  - NWA National Tag Team Championship (1 time) - with Buzz Sawyer
- Heart of America Sports Attractions
  - NWA Central States Heavyweight Championship (1 time)
- Pacific Northwest Wrestling
  - NWA Pacific Northwest Heavyweight Championship (4 times)
  - NWA Pacific Northwest Tag Team Championship (5 times) - with Buzz Sawyer (1 time), Tom Prichard (2 times), Rocky Johnson (1 time), and Steve Pardee (1 time)
- Pro Wrestling Illustrated
  - PWI Most Improved Wrestler of the Year (1983)
  - PWI ranked him # 404 of the 500 best singles wrestlers during the "PWI Years" in 2003.
- Ring Around The Northwest Newsletter
  - Tag Team of the Year (1984) - with Tom Pritchard
- Southwest Championship Wrestling
  - SCW Southwest Tag Team Championship (1 time) - with Chicky Starr
