= Joel Deaton =

American professional wrestler (born 1957)

Personal information
- Born: Joel Lofton Jones; August 1, 1957 (age 68) Tyler, Texas, U.S.

Professional wrestling career
- Ring name(s): Joel Deaton; Joe Deaton; Thunderfoot
- Billed height: 1.96 m (6 ft 5 in)
- Billed weight: 130 kg (287 lb)
- Debut: 1977
- Retired: 2019

Joel Lofton Jones (born August 1, 1957) is an American professional wrestler, better known as Joel Deaton or Joe Deaton. He is most noticed for being one of the members of a tag team in Jim Crockett Promotions known as the Thunderfoots. He was the original Thunderfoot.

== Career ==
Joel Jones was discovered while working as a personal trainer by Lars Anderson. Joel was trained by Anderson, who trained him along with David Deaton, who would go on to be his tag team partner.

Anderson started his own promotion as a rival to the established Georgia Championship Wrestling, that being World League Wrestling. Jones and Deaton were re-christened "The Bruno Brothers" and were the company's top tag team winning the titles. After a disastrous tour of the West Indies, the company was on the verge of folding, the Deatons left and joined the rival Georgia Championship Wrestling.

After a brief stays in Georgia & Louisiana they joined Southwest Championship Wrestling under booker Wahoo McDaniel and there they wrestled as "the new Anderson Brothers". From there they relocated to Florida Championship Wrestling and became The Deaton Brothers.

Joel Jones started wrestling in 1983 as "Outlaw" Joel Deaton in the National Wrestling Alliance's Georgia territory. In 1984, he went to the NWA's Jim Crockett Promotions where he wrestled as the masked Thunderfoot. He would "load" his boot during his matches and kick his opponents in the head to gain the victory. He was managed by J. J. Dillon and often teamed with Black Bart.

Dillon left him to manage the Four Horsemen in late 1985. Deaton still as Thunderfoot was joined by Gene Ligon who became Thunderfoot #2, they moved to the NWA's Central States territory and in September 1986 won the tag team titles. On their return to Jim Crockett Promotions the Thunderfoots were used as preliminary wrestlers. Deaton left the team (replaced by David Isley, the team of Ligon & Isley went to on to win the tag titles in Rob Russen's IWA) and Joel once again teamed up with David Deaton. Unfortunately Joel was involved in a head on car accident and was sidelined, he and David left JCP for the last time.

In 1988 Joel returned to action in Joe Pedicino and Jerry Blackwell owned, Buck Robley booked Southern Championship Wrestling where he won the SCW Heavyweight title 8 times and the tag team titles 7 times (with Dave Deaton) and feuded with Georgia Power (Nightmare Ted Allen & Jimmy Powell) & Terry Gordy. In that same year Deaton appeared in Nelson Royal's Atlantic Coast Wrestling as part of The Outlaw Deaton Brothers again with brother Hoss (Dave) Deaton.

In 1991, Jones wrestled as Joel Deaton in the Global Wrestling Federation and teamed with Chaz Taylor in the tournament for the GWF Tag Team Championship. In that same year he formed his most successful team with Billy Black to win the Georgia All Star Wrestling tag team titles.

July 1991 was Deaton's finest hour as he and Billy Black (a.k.a. The Wild Bunch) teamed up to win the All Asia Tag Team Championship in All Japan, and in 1992, The Wild Bunch made their debuts in Smoky Mountain Wrestling.

Deaton & Black remained staples in All Japan throughout the 90's as well as working for the new NWA Georgia territory in 1998. They won the Georgia tag team titles in April 1999, however due to a backstage altercation involving Billy Black & NWA promoter Bill Behrens, they were stripped of the titles, and Black was fired.

Deaton was virtually inactive until 2004 when he returned to action in the Carolina independent scene and in 2009 and 2010, Deaton has resurfaced appearing in his home state of Georgia for promotions such as Rampage Pro Wrestling, Allstar Wrestling Network and Championship Wrestling Overload, often teaming or feuding with legends such as Killer Keith Steinborn or Abdullah the Butcher. Deaton is one of the names that will be a part of the rebirth of Georgia Championship Wrestling.

== Championships and accomplishments ==
- All Japan Pro Wrestling

- All Asia Tag Team Championship (1 time) - with Billy Black
- World's Strongest Tag Determination League Excite Award (1990) – with Dick Slater

- Central States Wrestling

- NWA Central States Tag Team Championship (1 time) – with Thunderfoot #2 (Gene Ligon)

- Georgia Championship Wrestling

- NWA Georgia Tag Team Championship (1 time) - with Billy Black

- Georgia All Star Wrestling

- GASW Tag Team Championship (5 times) - with Billy Black

- Southern Championship Wrestling

- SCW Heavyweight Championship (8 times)
- SCW Tag Team Championship (7 times) - with Dave Deaton

- NWA Tri-State

- NWA Tri-State Tag Team Championship (1 time) - with Dave Deaton

- World League Wrestling (circa Georgia 1977)

- WLW Tag Team Championship (1 time) - with Dave Deaton

- Pro Wrestling Illustrated

- PWI ranked him # 492 of the 500 best singles wrestlers during the "PWI Years" in 2003.
