= The Bushwhackers =

Professional wrestling tag team

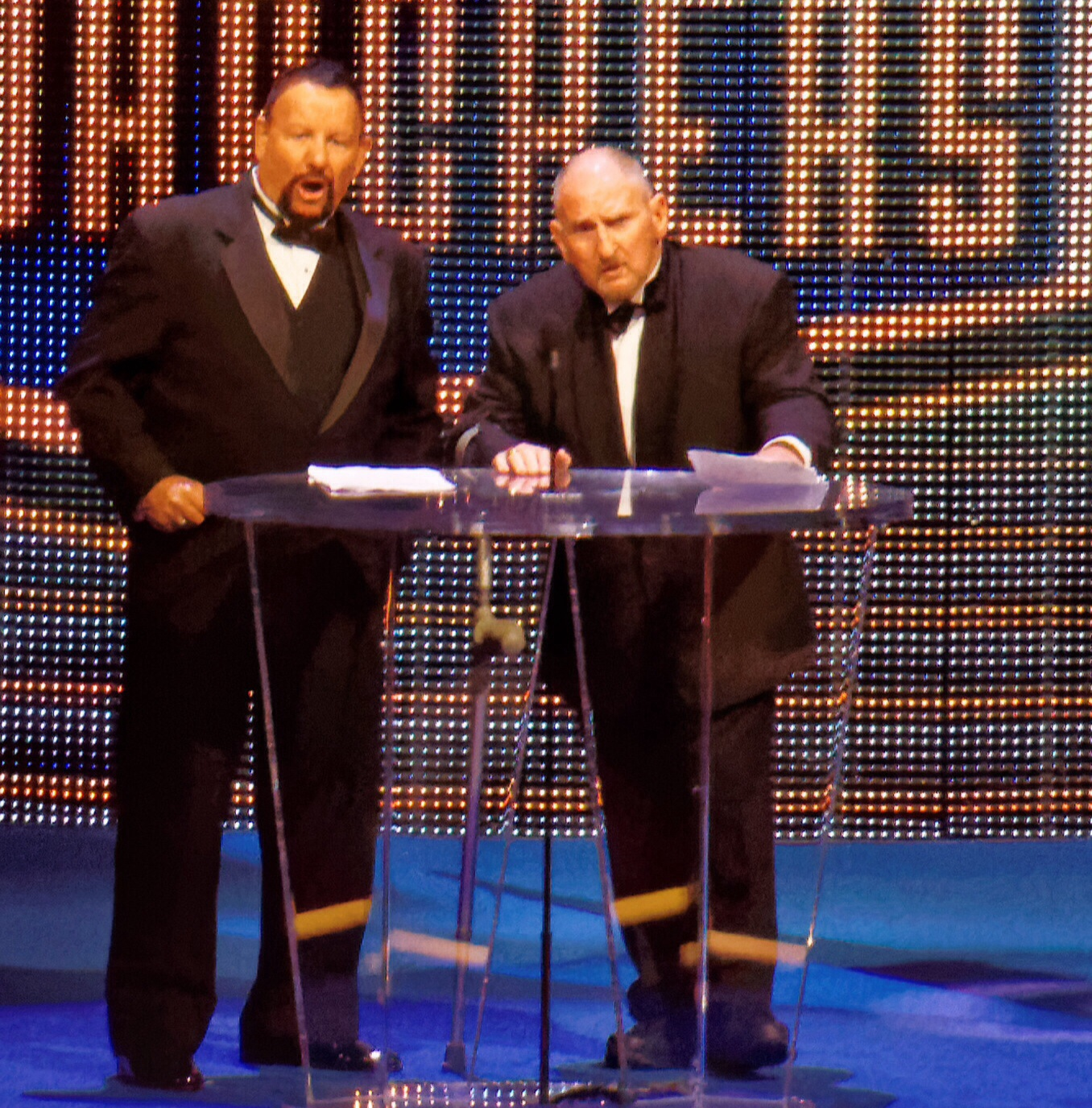
- Luke Williams (left) and Butch Miller at their WWE Hall of Fame induction in 2015

Tag team
- Name(s): The Bushwhackers; The Kiwis; The Kiwi Sheepherders; Los Pastores (in Puerto Rico); The New Zealand Sheepherders; The Sheepherders; Los Sacamantecas (Spain)
- Billed heights: Williams: 1.83 m (6 ft 0 in); Miller: 1.73 m (5 ft 8 in)
- Combined billed weight: 225 kg (496 lb; 35.4 st)
- Billed from: New Zealand
- Former members: Butch Miller; Jonathan Boyd; Luke Williams; Rip Morgan
- Years active: 1966–2001

The Bushwhackers were a professional wrestling tag team who competed first as the New Zealand Kiwis and then as The Sheepherders during their 36-year career as a tag team. They wrestled in the World Wrestling Federation, Jim Crockett Promotions, and on the independent territorial wrestling circuits. The Bushwhackers consisted of Butch Miller and Luke Williams while the Sheepherders also included Jonathan Boyd and Rip Morgan as members at times. Williams and Miller were inducted into the WWE Hall of Fame class of 2015, and the Professional Wrestling Hall of Fame and Museum in 2020.

== History ==
=== The Kiwis (1966–1975) ===
Luke Williams and Butch Miller started wrestling as The Kiwis for NWA New Zealand (later known as All-Star Pro Wrestling) in 1966, where they achieved a great deal of regional success. After working Australasia and the Eastern Circuit (Singapore, Malaysia, Japan), the duo was booked in North America in "Grand Prix" (Quebec, The Maritimes, Ontario, Vermont), a promotion owned by the Vachon family and Edouard Carpentier, in 1972 by fellow New Zealander Steve Rickard.

Williams and Miller worked in Canada for various promotions, most notably Stu Hart's Stampede Wrestling, billed as The Kiwis (Miller was known as "Nick Carter" and Williams was known as "Sweet William"). The Kiwis began their first recorded title reign by defeating Bob Pringle and Bill Cody for the Stampede International Tag Team Championship on 6 January 1974. The Kiwis lost the title to Tokyo Joe and the Great Saki, only to regain it a short time later. The Kiwis lost the title for good to Stan Kowalski and Duke Savage and were unsuccessful in subsequent rematches. In 1974, they worked in Japan for International Wrestling Enterprise (IWE). They returned to their home country of New Zealand in late 1975 for the first wrestling television tapings On the Mat. In 1976, Williams returned to Japan for IWE. Both men were inactive from wrestling for a few years.

=== The New Zealand Sheepherders/Los Pastores (1978–1981) ===
They returned to wrestling and reunited in New Zealand in late 1978. They made a stop for All Japan Pro Wrestling in 1979. Returning to North America in late 1979, they worked for 50th State Big Time Wrestling. Later the same year, they moved to Oregon to work for Don Owen's Pacific Northwest Wrestling, working from Northern California to Vancouver, where they had a year-long feud with Roddy Piper and Rick Martel in 1980. This was when their name changed to The New Zealand Sheepherders.

Their next stop was NWA Crockett Promotions in Charlotte, North Carolina. They won the Mid-Atlantic Tag Team titles on their third weekend in the territory from Buzz Sawyer and Matt Borne. They later lost the belts to Rocky Johnson and Dewey Robertson.

The Sheepherders then worked for the World Wrestling Council (WWC) in 1981 as Los Pastores. A short time into their run with WWC, they defeated Carlos Colon and Invader I for the WWC North American Tag Team Championship, defending it for over a month until being defeated by Los Medicos. Los Pastores regained the belts on 22 May and held them until coming up short against Jack and Jerry Brisco on 8 August 1981.

=== The New Sheepherders (1981–1985) ===
After the team left WWC, Miller decided he wanted to move closer to home to be with family and returned to Australia and New Zealand to wrestle. Williams remained in the United States, reforming the team with "Lord" Jonathan Boyd. The duo of Williams and Boyd quickly gained a reputation as one of the most violent, hard-hitting teams in the business. In late 1981 in South Eastern Championship Wrestling, the team of Robert Fuller and Jos LeDuc had split up after LeDuc turned on Fuller during a match. LeDuc brought in the Sheepherders to be a part of his Commonwealth Connection stable to fight against Fuller and his family. In December 1981, the Sheepherders won the NWA Southeast Tag Team Championship, which had been vacated when Fuller and LeDuc split and defended the title against Fuller and various partners. On 11 September 1982, the Sheepherders lost to Fuller and Jimmy Golden and were "run out" of the territory.

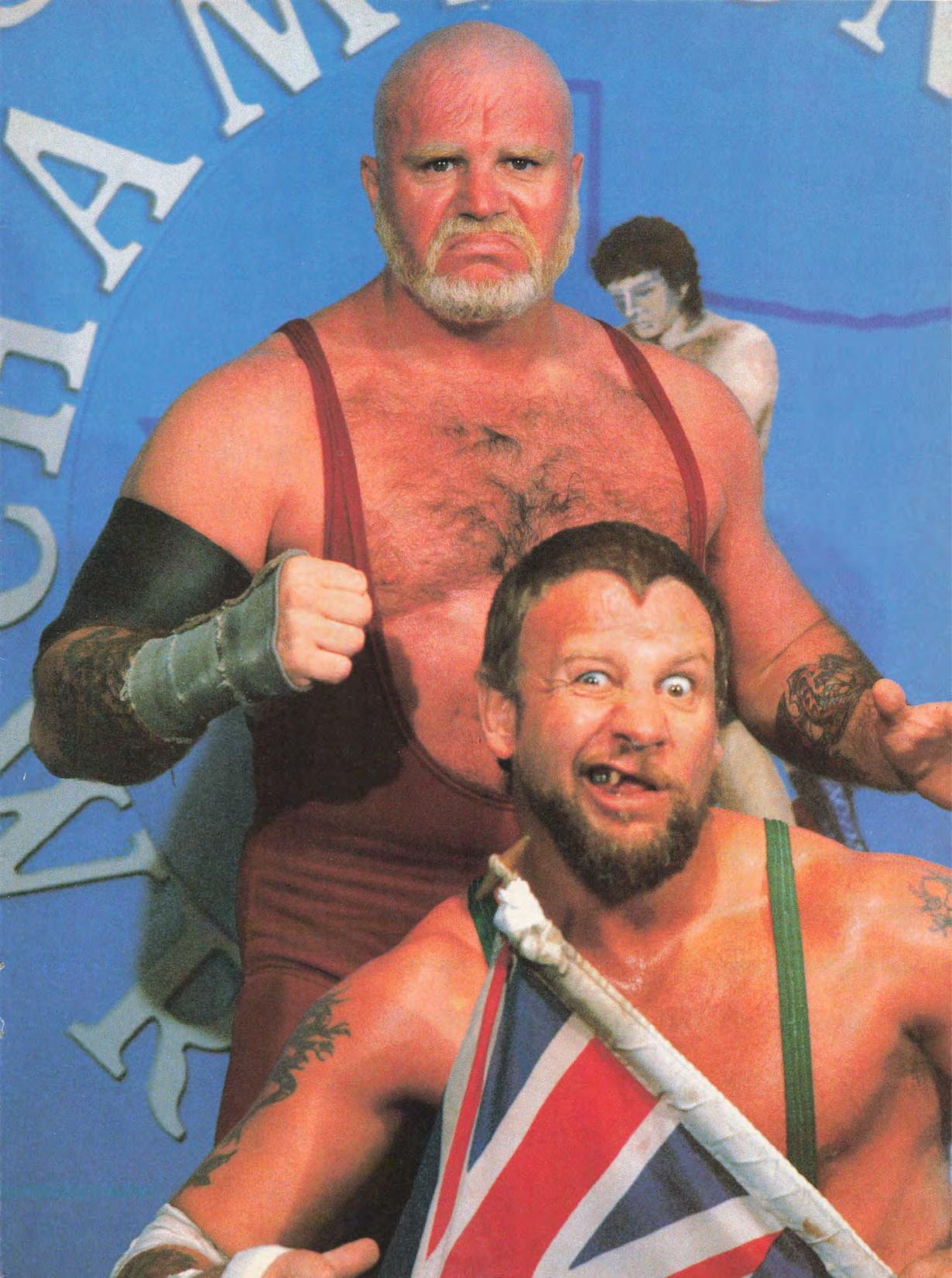
Boyd (top) and Luke (bottom) as The New Sheepherders in SWCW, 1983

Boyd and Williams next appeared in the Memphis, TN-based promotion Continental Wrestling Association run by Jerry Jarrett and Jerry Lawler. Making their debut in October 1982, the team quickly became involved in a feud with Jacques Rougeau and Terry Taylor, clashing weekly with them at the Mid-South Coliseum, with the Sheepherders brawling their way to victory. Taylor and Rougeau redeemed themselves in the end by defeating the Sheepherders in a "coal miner's glove" match. The Sheepherders returned to the ring later that same night and defeated the territory's main stars Jerry Lawler and Bill Dundee.

The next feud of Boyd and Williams was with The Fabulous Ones (Stan Lane and Steve Keirn). The contrast between the "pretty boy"-styled, technically polished Fabulous Ones and the ugly, brawling savage Sheepherders made them effective opponents and repeatedly drew big crowds wherever they fought. The series of matches started out fairly evenly, with the Fabulous Ones and the Sheepherders splitting the wins. Later, bouts often ended without a definite winner. In late 1982, the Sheepherders won the AWA Southern Tag Team Championship from The Fabulous Ones. Between late December 1982 and mid-February 1983, the title switched hands between the teams four times, with The Fabulous Ones ending up champions in the end. On 28 March 1983, the Sheepherders wrestled their last match in the Mid-South Coliseum before leaving the CWA.

Boyd and Williams resurfaced in Southwest Championship Wrestling (SWCW) only weeks later. Their first targets were the reigning Southwest Tag Team Champions The Grapplers (Len Denton and Tony Anthony). In May 1983, the Sheepherders captured the title when The Grapplers' manager Don Carson turned on them mid-match to ensure the Sheepherders' victory. The Sheepherders' run with the gold was short-lived; in June, Boyd legitimately broke his leg in a car accident, causing SWCW to name Bobby Jaggers as his replacement. After Williams and Jaggers lost a non-title match to Bob Sweetan and Sweet Brown Sugar, Williams turned on Jaggers and the title was vacated. While Boyd was out with the broken leg, Williams was reunited with his old tag-team partner Butch Miller.

Williams and Miller stayed with SWCW through the rest of 1983, and into 1984, when the team came head to head with the Fabulous Ones once again, feuding over the SWCW World Tag Team Championship. The Fabulous Ones had supposedly won the title in Australia, though it is generally believed the tournament they won to be crowned was actually a fabrication made up by SWCW. The Sheepherders dethroned The Fabulous Ones on 4 March and held the titles until they were retired by SWCW in September 1984. Miller and Williams then returned to Puerto Rico and the WWC, this time competing as The Sheepherders (Los Pastores). On 6 January 1985 they defeated Invader I and Invader III for the WWC North American Tag Team Championship in Bayamon, PR. They lost and then regained the titles from Invaders I & III in March, and then held on to the gold until August, when the Invaders won it back.

=== Jonathan Boyd and Rip Morgan (1985–1986) ===
While the Sheepherders were in Puerto Rico, another Sheepherders team was spreading destruction all over the CWA in Memphis. For the first time, a Sheepherder team existed without Luke Williams as a member, as Jonathan Boyd teamed up with Rip Morgan (former flag bearer for the Sheepherders & nephew to Butch Miller) under the name The Kiwi Sheepherders. Boyd and Morgan defeated their recurring nemeses, the Fabulous Ones, for the AWA Southern Tag Team Championship on 17 June 1985. In the storyline, the team was soon stripped of the titles due to their excessive cheating, but had the titles returned to them when they threatened to sue CWA management. The Fabulous Ones took them by beating them four times in a row between 5 September and 12 October.

The Kiwi Sheepherders then began feuding with another team: The Fantastics (Bobby Fulton and Tommy Rogers). In the winter of 1985, the Kiwi Sheepherders and the Fantastics traded wins back and forth with no side gaining a clear advantage in the feud. In January 1986, the Kiwi Sheepherders defeated the team of Koko Ware and Rick Casey as well as team of Tojo Yamamoto and Dirty Rhodes to reach the finals of a tournament to crown new Southern Tag Team Champions, but they fell in the finals to the Fantastics. The feud culminated as the two teams clashed in a "No DQ Loser Leaves Town" match on 20 January 1986. The Kiwi Sheepherders lost and left Memphis, while the Fantastics rode a new wave of popularity gained from the feud.

=== The Originals (1986–1988) ===
When Williams and Miller returned to mainland USA and Bill Watts' UWF, they defeated Ted DiBiase and Steve Williams for the UWF Tag Team Championship on 16 March 1986, but fell to The Fantastics on 30 March in Tulsa, OK. The Sheepherders continued for the UWF on and off over the next couple of years, taking time out to participate in the first-ever Jim Crockett Memorial Tag Team Cup, in which they beat Hector and Chavo Guerrero Sr. in the first round and The Rock 'n' Roll Express in the second round. In the third round, they clashed with the Fantastics in a match that ended in a double DQ. Back in the UWF for its big "Mid South Superdome Show", The Sheepherders clashed with The Fantastics once more; this time Williams and Miller lost in a "New Zealand Boot camp" match to the UWF Tag champions.

After being unable to beat the Fantastics in several rematches, The Sheepherders returned to Puerto Rico during the summer of 1986 and beat the Rock’N’Roll RPMs (Mike Davis and Tommy Lane) for the WWC World Tag Team Championship on 3 August. They defended the titles for about six weeks before losing them to the RPMs on 21 September. When this short run with the WWC ended, Williams and Miller traveled to Florida where they worked for Championship Wrestling from Florida. On 7 October, The Sheepherders ended The Fabulous Ones' first reign with the NWA Florida United States Tag Team Championship, but Lane and Keirn got the better of them on 30 November, regaining the belts.

The Sheepherders then returned to the CWA Memphis territory. On 10 January, they beat Badd Company (Pat Tanaka and Paul Diamond) for the CWA/AWA International Tag Team Championship but lost it to Badd Company as fast as they had won it. After the quick feud with Badd Company, The Sheepherders once again feuded with the Fabulous Ones. Keirn and Lane dominated the matches and once again "ran off" the Sheepherders.

After leaving Memphis, The Sheepherders were invited to participate in New Japan Pro-Wrestling's "IWGP Tag Team Title League 1987". The round-robin tournament took place from 23 February to 20 March. They only had a brief stay with New Japan, opting to return to Puerto Rico and the WWC. Here they started a feud with Chris and Mark Youngblood. The feud saw Williams and Miller win the WWC World Tag Team Championship on 4 April, and then defend it until the Youngbloods regained the titles on 10 May in a steel cage match.

After their spring run with the WWC, The Sheepherders returned to Florida and instantly became challengers for Mike Graham and Steve Keirn's NWA Florida Tag Team Championship. On 26 June 1987, they won the championship. A month later, The Sheepherders defended their Florida Tag Team title at The Great American Bash from the Miami Orange Bowl, brawling to a double disqualification with Jimmy and Ron Garvin. Their run with the title came to an end on 29 August at the hands of Graham and Keirn.

After losing the Florida titles, Williams and Miller returned to the UWF and began a second run as the UWF World Tag Team Championship after defeating the Lightning Express (Brad Armstrong and Tim Horner) on 16 October. The Sheepherders held the belts until the UWF was purchased by Jim Crockett and merged into Jim Crockett Promotions (JCP), to form the forerunner of World Championship Wrestling (WCW). After this merger, The Sheepherders worked for JCP, participating in the third Jim Crockett, Sr. Memorial Tag Team Tournament Cup. At Clash of the Champions II, they faced off against the NWA United States Tag Team Champions, The Fantastics, in a losing effort. At Clash of the Champions III, they lost to Steve Williams and Nikita Koloff, despite the interference of Rip Morgan on their behalf. Just as it looked like the Sheepherders were about to face the Fantastics in the finals of a tournament to crown new United States Tag Team champions, Luke Williams and Butch Miller signed with Vince McMahon's World Wrestling Federation (WWF).

=== The Bushwhackers (1988–1996) ===
==== 1988–1990 ====
In December 1988, Williams and Miller debuted with the WWF in the midst of its aggressive national expansion. The team's name was changed to The Bushwhackers and developed a more comedic style. The comedy act involved licking (each other, fans, and even their opponents), as well as using their existing distinctive march, swinging their flexed arms. The Bushwhackers made their debut on a matinee house show on 26 December 1988, facing The Bolsheviks.

Only a few days into their run with the WWF, the Bushwhackers had their first match with The Bolsheviks (Boris Zhukov and Nikolai Volkoff). In February, the Bushwhackers began a feud with The Fabulous Rougeau Brothers, the first feud to really feature the Bushwhackers on WWF television. The two teams took their conflict to WrestleMania V where the Bushwhackers were victorious. The teams clashed again on the Saturday Night's Main Event XXIII, and once again the Bushwhackers were victorious. The Bushwhackers defeated the Rougeaus twice more, first at the 1989 Survivor Series and again at the 1990 Royal Rumble.

The Bushwhackers quickly became one of the most popular duos with children, chiefly due to the wildly comedic nature of their antics (including their trademark "Bushwhacker walk"), their pastoral musical theme, and their friendly interaction with the audience. This was a stark contrast to their long pre-WWF career as one of the most violent tag teams in wrestling. By 1990, the Bushwhackers were feuding with the newly established team Rhythm and Blues (The Honky Tonk Man and Greg Valentine). The Bushwhackers' WrestleMania VI appearance came at the expense of Rhythm and Blues as they showed up during a segment, attacking Honky Tonk Man and Valentine. Later on, the team would be used to help establish newcomers The Orient Express (Pat Tanaka and Akio Sato). The feud with the Orient Express culminated at Survivor Series 1990 where Williams and Miller teamed up with Nikolai Volkoff and Tito Santana to form "The Alliance" and take on Sgt. Slaughter, Boris Zhukov and the Orient Express team dubbed "The Mercenaries".

==== 1991–1992 ====
The Bushwhackers received a shot at the WWF World Tag Team Title on the 27 April Saturday Night's Main Event XXIX against The Nasty Boys, but were defeated. In a televised 6-man tag-team match the Bushwhackers teamed with Tugboat against Earthquake and the Nasty Boys, Tugboat turned on his partners after a few minutes of action and joined Earthquake in attacking the two New Zealanders. After the heel turn Tugboat changed his name to Typhoon and together they became known as The Natural Disasters. The Bushwhackers were easily defeated at SummerSlam 1991 by the team.

Their next feud was with the Beverly Brothers (Blake and Beau). The two teams first clashed at the 1991 Survivor Series where they were on opposite sides in a 4 on 4 elimination match. On the night the Beverly Brothers got the upper hand and eliminated both Williams and Miller. The Beverly Brothers' manager The Genius kept interfering in the matches so the Bushwhackers brought in a manager of their own, Jamison. Despite the addition of Jamison, the Beverly Brothers defeated the Bushwhackers at Royal Rumble 1992. The Bushwhackers did gain some small measure of revenge on the Beverly Brothers when they defeated the team in a "dark match" at WrestleMania VIII. Luke and Butch continued their feud with the Beverlys throughout the spring and summer of 1992, generally coming out victorious in these encounters.

On the 23 August 1992 "SummerSlam Spectacular" show that preceded the PPV in the United Kingdom, the Bushwhackers received a title shot against WWF Tag-Tam Champions Money Incorporated. However, in this match, which aired on the USA Network, they fell short as Irwin R. Schyster pinned Butch following interference by Jimmy Hart. Their next PPV appearance came at SummerSlam '92, where they tag-teamed with Jim Duggan in a dark match that was subsequently aired on Prime Time Wrestling, and defeated The Mountie and The Nasty Boys. They were slated to team with The Natural Disasters against Money Inc. and The Beverly Brothers at the 1992 Survivor Series; however on the 7 November edition of WWF Superstars they agreed to let former Jimmy Hart charges The Nasty Boys take their place after the duo turned on their manager. The Bushwhackers concluded the year by resuming their long-running feud with the Beverly Brothers on house shows, this time teaming with Tiger Jackson against Beau, Blake, and Little Louie in six-man matches.

==== 1993–1996 ====
The Bushwhackers opened 1993 with another opportunity against WWF Tag-Team Champions Money Inc. Once again they were defeated, this time on a 25 January taping of WWF Superstars in San Jose, California. Beginning in February they began a new feud with the newly signed team the Headshrinkers (Fatu and Samu), and were used to "put over" the team. Following a winless stretch against Fatu and Samu, the Bushwhackers restarted their now over year old rivalry with the Beverly Brothers. As in late 1992, these were comedy matches alongside dwarf Tiger Jackson against the Beverly Brothers and Little Louie. On 22 March 1993 the Bushwhackers appeared on Monday Night RAW, defeating Damien Demento and The Repo Man. This would be Luke and Butch's first RAW appearance; meanwhile, it would be the final WWF appearance for Repo Man (Barry Darsow).

In August, the Bushwhackers made a quick trip to Puerto Rico to appear at the WWC 20th Anniversary show on 8 August where they defeated the team of Mr. Hughes and The Warlord. When the team returned to the US, Williams and Miller gave the new WWF duo The Quebecers their first defeat when Butch pinned Jacques Rougeau on the 23 August 1993 edition of All American Wrestling. In the fall of 1993 they transitioned to a feud with another new team, this time facing Well Dunn in a house show series. In November 1993 they helped Doink the Clown in the clown's feud with Bam Bam Bigelow. Williams and Miller, as well as Mo and Mabel, all appeared at Survivor Series 1993 wearing the trademark green wig and face paint associated with Doink the Clown. The Bushwhackers and Men on a Mission defeated Bigelow, Bastion Booger and the Headshrinkers.

In March 1994, the Bushwhackers started feuding with SMW Tag-Team Champions The Heavenly Bodies (Tom Prichard and Jimmy Del Ray). Williams and Miller were undefeated against the Bodies until WrestleMania X, where they lost a dark match. In April they began a house show series with WWF Tag-Team Champions The Quebecers, but unlike the previous year the team was winless against Rougeau and Oullette. In the summer of 1994 they reversed fortunes and were undefeated against the preliminary tag-team The Executioners (Dwayne Gill and Barry Hardy). They finished the year defeating Well Dunn in numerous house show encounters, although at this point their opponents were little more than preliminary opposition. However, now five years into their tenure into the company, and their prospects for a world championship run had seemed to close.

The WWF was entering a "New Generation" era in 1995, and the Bushwhackers were now one of the last legacy acts. Still quite popular with the fanbase, they began the year with a successful series of encounters on the house show circuit against The Heavenly Bodies. Both Luke and Butch appeared in the 1995 Royal Rumble as separate participants. They continued to wrestle throughout the spring, defeating the Bodies and Well Dunn and remaining undefeated against preliminary opposition on television. However, their appearances became far more sporadic in the second half of 1995 following WWF touring cutbacks. They would wrestle only five more times that year, losing to WWF Tag-Team Champions Owen Hart and Yokozuna and the newly arrived Blu Twins. They would work for United States Wrestling Association in Memphis, Tennessee, that fall.

In March 1996, the Bushwhackers returned to the WWF after a six-month hiatus to participate in a tournament to crown new tag team champions. The Bushwhackers were beaten in the first round by eventual winners The Bodydonnas (Skip and Zip). When the Bushwhackers returned in 1996, they displayed traditional Australian stereotypes, including being accompanied to the ring by a giant kangaroo mascot. On 14 September, the Bushwhackers made their last appearance while under contract with the WWF, defeating Justin Bradshaw and Uncle Zebakiah at a house show.

==== After the WWF ====
After leaving the WWF, the team made special appearances in the independent circuit, including a return to WWC for its 24th Anniversary show, where they were billed as the Sheepherders and took on old rivals, Invaders I & II. They also appeared at Terry Funk's WrestleFest in Amarillo to celebrate "50 years of Funk" where they lost to old rivals Mark and Chris Youngblood. In 1998, they made a couple of appearances in Extreme Championship Wrestling (ECW) under the names Luke and Butch Dudley as "cousins" of The Dudley Brothers. In 1999, the Bushwhackers participated in Heroes of Wrestling, where Williams and Miller took on and defeated former WWF Tag Team Champions, The Iron Sheik and Nikolai Volkoff.

Williams and Miller made one of their last appearances as active wrestlers on 1 April 2001 when they participated in the WrestleMania X-Seven "Gimmick Battle Royal" which The Iron Sheik won. Luke was eliminated by Jim Cornette and Butch eliminated The Goon then got eliminated by Doink the Clown. On 15 June the team returned to Memphis one last time, fighting The Moondogs to a double disqualification on a special "Mid-South Clash of the Legends" show. During this period, they toured the UK with All Star Wrestling, often appearing in "triple tag" (six-man tag) matches teamed with Frank Casey, who had been wrestling for several years as the "British Bushwhacker" – a 'tribute' to Williams and Miller.

Their last match as a team was on 8 September 2001, in Farmville, Virginia, losing to Carnage and Mr. Big Stuff. Miller would retired from wrestling in 2001 after a neck injury and Williams retired in 2002.

Williams came out of retirement in 2007 where he worked for Ring Of Honor, appearances in New Zealand, Ultimate Championship Wrestling in Nova Scotia, Canada, and the independent circuit. As of 2026 he occasionally still wrestles for independent shows in the United States at 79 years old.

On 23 February 2015, it was announced by WWE that The Bushwhackers would be 2015 inductees into the WWE Hall of Fame. On 28 March 2015, they both attended the event to accept their induction.

On 2 April 2023, Miller died at 78.

== Other media ==
The Bushwhackers appeared as themselves in a 1994 episode of the sitcom Family Matters, wrestling against Carl Winslow and Steve Urkel, who are forced to fill in for and wrestle as The Psycho Twins. They also appeared in the 1998 "How Many Times" music video for the Insane Clown Posse. The Bushwhackers released their autobiography "The Bushwhackers: Blood, Sweat & Cheers", along with writer John E. Crowther, on 27 September 2022.

== Championships and accomplishments ==
=== Miller and Williams ===
- Allied Powers Wrestling Federation
  - APWF Tag Team Championship (1 time)
- Can-Am Wrestling
  - Can-Am Tag Team Championship (1 time)
- Cauliflower Alley Club
  - Tag Team Award (2025)
- Continental Wrestling Association
  - CWA International Tag Team Championship (1 time)
- Championship Wrestling from Florida
  - NWA Florida Tag Team Championship (1 time)
  - NWA United States Tag Team Championship (Florida version) (1 time)
- International Wrestling Association
  - IWA Tag Team Championship (1 time)
- International Professional Wrestling Hall of Fame
  - Class of 2026
- Mid-Atlantic Championship Wrestling
  - NWA Mid-Atlantic Tag Team Championship (1 time)
- NWA All-Star Wrestling
  - NWA Canadian Tag Team Championship (Vancouver version) (1 time)
- Pacific Northwest Wrestling
  - NWA Pacific Northwest Tag Team Championship (3 times)
- Pro Wrestling Illustrated
  - PWI ranked them # 71 of the best 100 tag teams of the "PWI Years".
- Professional Wrestling Hall of Fame and Museum
  - Class of 2020
- Ring Around The Northwest Newsletter
  - Tag Team of the Year (1979–1980)
- Stampede Wrestling
  - Stampede International Tag Team Championship (2 times)
- Southwest Championship Wrestling
  - SWCW World Tag Team Championship (1 time)
- Ultimate Championship Wrestling
  - UCW Tag Team Championship (1 time)
- United States Wrestling League
  - USWL Tag Team Championship (1 time)
- Universal Wrestling Federation
  - UWF Tag Team Championship (2 times)
- World Wide Wrestling Alliance
  - WWWA Tag Team Championship (2 times)
- World Wrestling Council
  - WWC North American Tag Team Championship (4 times)
  - WWC World Tag Team Championship (2 times)
- WWE
  - WWE Hall of Fame (Class of 2015)
- Wrestling Observer Newsletter awards
  - Worst Tag Team (1992, 1994)
  - Worst Worked Match of the Year (1993) with Men on a Mission vs. The Headshrinkers, Bastion Booger, and Bam Bam Bigelow at Survivor Series

=== Boyd and Williams ===
- Continental Wrestling Association
  - AWA Southern Tag Team Championship (2 times)
- Southeastern Championship Wrestling
  - NWA Southeastern Tag Team Championship (1 time)
- Southwest Championship Wrestling
  - SWCW Southwest Tag Team Championship (1 time)

=== Boyd and Rip Morgan ===
- Continental Wrestling Association
  - AWA Southern Tag Team Championship (5 times)
