= Bushwhacker Luke =

New Zealand professional wrestler (born 1947)

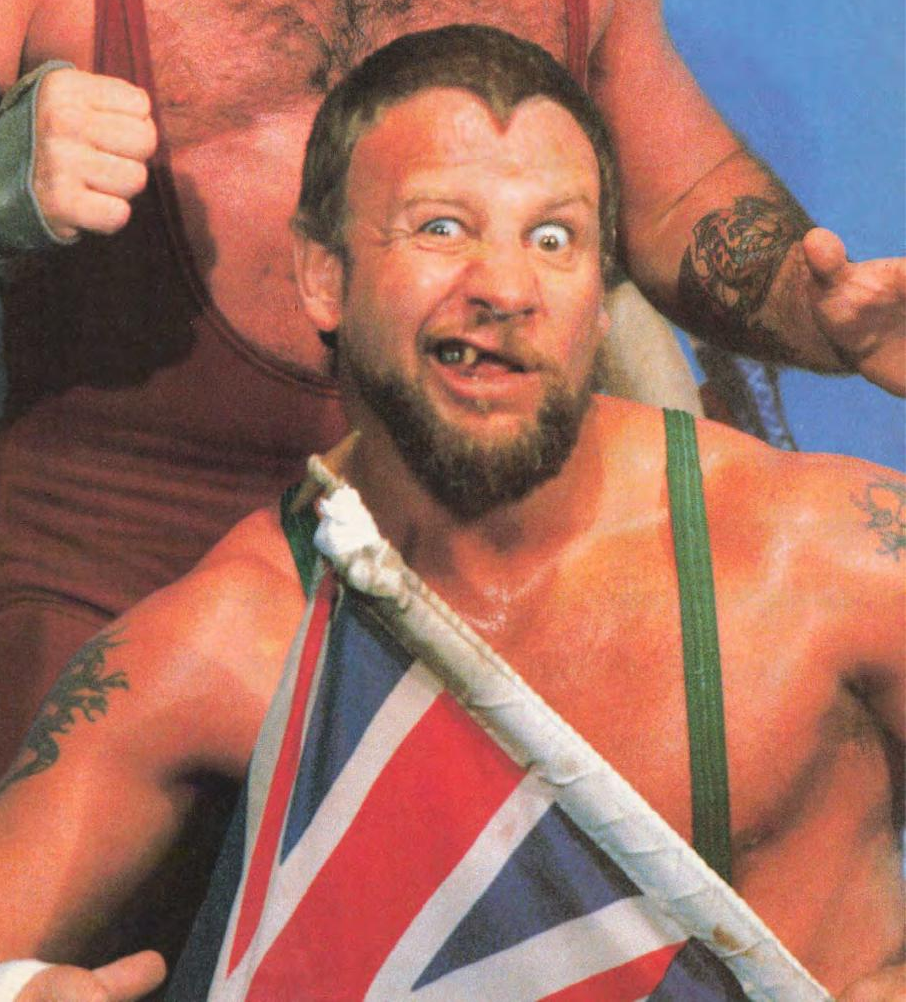
- Luke, c. 1983

Personal information
- Born: Brian Wickens; 8 January 1947 (age 79) Auckland, New Zealand
- Children: 1

Professional wrestling career
- Ring name(s): Bushwhacker Luke; Cousin Luke; Cousin Luke Dudley; Gorgeous Teddy Williams "Luke" Doink; Luke Williams; Pretty Boy Floyd; Sweet William
- Billed height: 6 ft 0 in (183 cm)
- Billed weight: 242 lb (110 kg)
- Billed from: Wellington, New Zealand
- Debut: 1962

Brian Wickens (born 8 January 1947) is a New Zealand professional wrestler. He is best known for his appearances in the World Wrestling Federation (later, WWE) under the ring name Bushwhacker Luke, where he teamed with Bushwhacker Butch as The Bushwhackers. He is also known for his appearances under the ring name Luke Williams for promotions such as NWA New Zealand, Stampede Wrestling, Pacific Northwest Wrestling, Mid Atlantic Championship Wrestling, Southwest Championship Wrestling, and the Universal Wrestling Federation, where he teamed with Butch as "The Kiwis" and "The Sheepherders".

Along with Butch, Luke held championships including the NWA Florida Tag Team Championship, NWA Mid-Atlantic Tag Team Championship, NWA Pacific Northwest Tag Team Championship, WWC North America and World Tag Team Championship and UWF World Tag Team Championship. The duo were inducted into the WWE Hall of Fame in 2015 and the Professional Wrestling Hall of Fame and Museum in 2020.

== Professional wrestling career ==
=== Early career (1962–1974) ===
Luke Williams started wrestling for NWA New Zealand (later known as All-Star Pro Wrestling) with his friend and long term tag team partner Butch Miller in 1962 where he achieved a great deal of regional success. After working Australasia and the Eastern Circuit (Singapore, Malaysia, and Japan), the duo was booked in North America in "Grand Prix" (Quebec, The Maritimes, Ontario, and Vermont), a very successful promotion owned by the famous Vachons and Edouard Carpentier, in 1972 by fellow New Zealander Steve Rickard, who was also the booker for "NWA Hawaii".

Luke and Butch worked in Canada for Stu Hart's Stampede Wrestling billed as The Kiwis (Butch was known as "Nick Carter" and Luke was known as "Sweet William"). The first recorded title that the Kiwis won was in 1974, when the duo beat Bob Pringle and Bill Cody for the Stampede International Tag Team Championship on 6 January 1974. The Kiwis lost the titles to Tokyo Joe and the Great Saki, only to regain them a short time later. The Kiwis lost the titles for good when Stan Kowalski and Dutch Savage defeated them and kept the titles away from them in subsequent rematches.

=== The Sheepherders (1974–1981) ===
After leaving Stampede Wrestling, the Kiwis began doing double duty in Japan for International Wrestling Enterprise (IWE). They would disband in 1975. Miller temporarily retired from the sport as Williams continued working for IWE until 1976 and was inactive until 1979. The Kiwis reunited working in NWA Pacific Northwest as well as the Canadian-based International All-Star Wrestling around 1979–1980 as "the Kiwi Sheepherders". In 1979, the team won the NWA Pacific Northwest Tag Team Championship on three occasions between 21 July and 5 August 1980, before they left the territory. On 22 September, the Sheepherders lost the gold to Dutch Savage and Stan Stasiak, only to regain them a week later. On 11 February 1980, the Sheepherders became double champions when they downed Dutch Savage and Stan Stasiak, this time for the NWA Canadian Tag Team Championship. Top faces Rick Martel and "Rowdy" Roddy Piper teamed up in May, to take the NWA Canadian tag title from the Sheepherders and, in effect, run the duo out of the Northwest region by August, gaining the NWA Pacific Northwest tag titles when the Sheepherders left the promotion.

The next stop for the Sheepherders was a brief stay in the Mid Atlantic Championship Wrestling territory run by Jim Crockett. In MACW, the two won the NWA Mid-Atlantic Tag Team Championship by beating Matt Borne and Buzz Sawyer for the gold. The Sheepherders held onto the gold for close to three months before dropping it to Dewey Robertson and Rocky Johnson on 12 December. After losing the titles, Luke and Butch headed for warmer weather as they traveled to Puerto Rico and began working for the World Wrestling Council as Los Pastores. While in Puerto Rico, the team won the WWC World Tag Team Championship once and WWC North American Tag Team Championship twice while touring the island were they have feuds with the Invaders and Carlos Colon and Jose Miguel Perez.

=== The New Sheepherders (1981–1983) ===
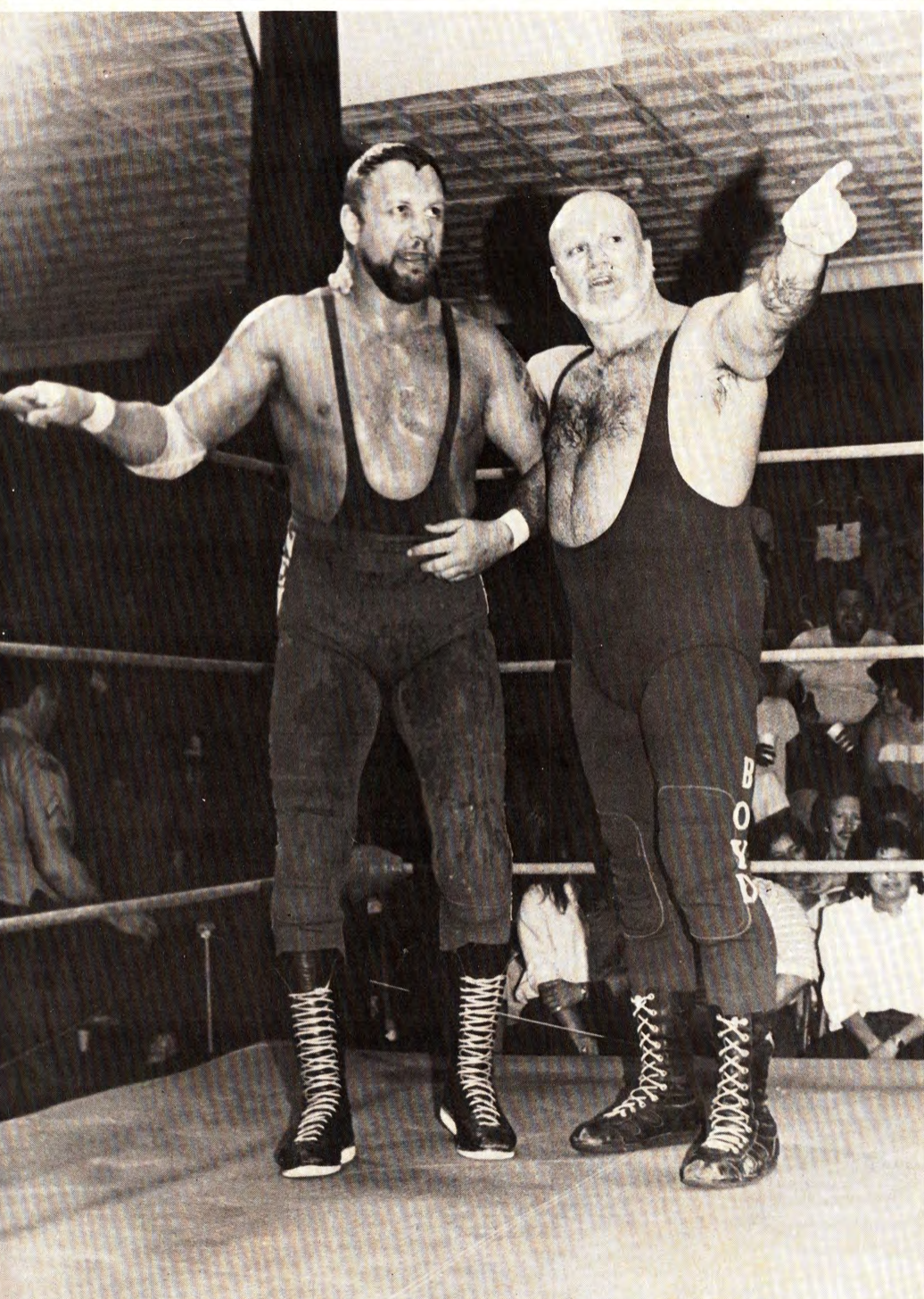
Luke (left) and Jonathan Boyd (right) as the New Sheepherders, c. 1983

After the team left WWC, Butch decided that he wanted to return closer to home and went to Australia to wrestle. Luke remained in the United States determined to keep the "Sheepherders" name on everyone's lips by teaming up with "Lord" Jonathan Boyd (formerly of the Royal Kangaroos). The duo of Williams and Boyd quickly gained a reputation of one of the most violent, hard-hitting teams in the business. One of the first people to feel the wrath of the "new and improved" Sheepherders was Robert Fuller in South Eastern Championship Wrestling. In December 1981, the Sheepherders won the NWA Southeast Tag Team Championship that had been vacated when Robert Fuller and Jos LeDuc split. After winning the title, Boyd and Williams became embroiled in a bitter feud with Robert Fuller and various partners including his brother Ron Fuller and his cousin Jimmy Golden (later known as Bunkhouse Buck). One act that made the Sheepherders the most hated men in SECW for a while was when the duo kayfabe attacked and injured Jimmy's father Billy Golden. After almost 10 months with the title, the Sheepherders were finally defeated by Fuller and Golden; this ended the feud on a high note for the face duo, as the Sheepherders were "run out" of the territory.

Boyd and Williams moved slightly more north as they began to work in the Memphis based promotion Continental Wrestling Association owned and operated by Jerry Jarrett and Jerry Lawler. In the CWA, the Sheepherders would start a feud with The Fabulous Ones (Stan Lane and Steve Keirn). In late 1982, the Sheepherders won the AWA Southern Tag Team Championship from Lane and Keirn. Between late December and mid-February, the two teams traded the belts back and forth 4 times with the Fabulous Ones ending up with possession of them in the end. On 28 March, the Sheepherders wrestled their last match in the Mid-South Coliseum before leaving the CWA.

Boyd and Williams resurfaced in Southwest Championship Wrestling only weeks later, continuing their brutal and destructive ways. Their first target was the reigning Southwest Tag Team Champions "The Grapplers" (Len Denton and Tony Anthony). In May, the Sheepherders won the gold from the duo through nefarious means; before the match Williams and Boyd had bribed the Grapplers' manager Don Carson and promised he would become a tag team champion, Carson turned on the Grapplers mid match to ensure the Sheepherders' victory. The Sheepherders run with the gold was short lived; Jonathan Boyd legitimately broke his leg in a car accident in June which forced the SWCW to name Bobby Jaggers as a replacement. After Williams and Jagger lost a non-title match to Bob Sweetan and Sweet Brown Sugar, Williams turned on Jaggers and the titles were vacated. While Boyd was out with the broken leg, Williams was reunited with his old tag-team partner, Butch straight from Australia.

=== Butch returns (1983–1988) ===
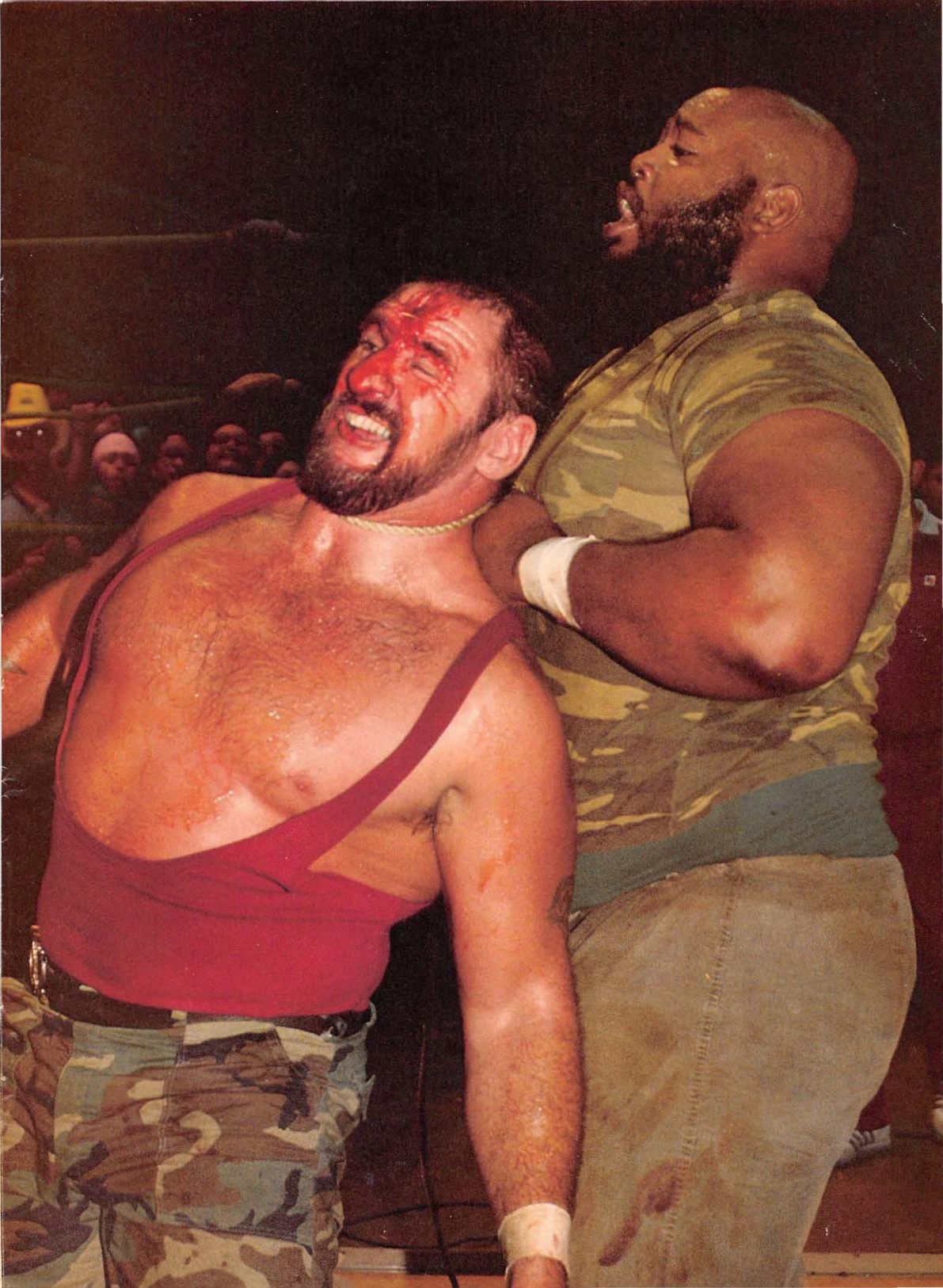
Luke (left) wrestling Elijah Akeem, c. 1984

Luke and Butch stayed with the SWCW through the rest of 1983 and into 1984. There, the two again came head-to-head with the Fabulous Ones; this time the prize was the SWCW World Tag Team Championship. The Fabulous Ones had supposedly won the titles in Australia, which is generally believed to be a fictitious tournament invented by the SWCW. The Sheepherders defeated the Fabs on 4 March and held the titles until the SWCW abandoned the tag team titles in September 1984. The next major stop for the Sheepherders was a return to Puerto Rico and the WWC, this time competing as "The Sheepherders" instead of "Los Pastores". On 6 January 1985, the team defeated Invader I and Invader III for the WWC North American Tag Team Championship in Bayamón, Puerto Rico. Butch and Luke lost and then regained the titles from Invaders I & III in March and held on to the gold until August when the Invaders won the tag team title back for good.

When Luke and Butch returned to main land USA and signed on with Bill Watts’ UWF, they quickly cemented their status by beating Ted DiBiase and Steve Williams for the UWF Tag Team Championship on 16 March 1986. The Sheepherders worked for Bill Watts on and off over the next couple of years, taking time out to participate in the first ever Jim Crockett Memorial Tag Team Cup where they made it to the third round. In the third round, the Sheepherders clashed with the Fantastics in an out-of-control brawl that ended in a double DQ. The winners of this match would have gone on to face eventual tournament winners The Road Warriors in the next round. Back in the UWF for their big "Mid South Superdome Show", the Sheepherders clashed with the Fantastics once more. This time, Luke and Butch lost in a "New Zealand Boot camp" match to the UWF Tag champs.

After being unable to beat the Fantastics on several occasions, the Sheepherders traveled back to Puerto Rico during the summer for a six-week run with the WWC World Tag Team Championship on 3 August. When their short run with WWC ended, Luke and Butch sought new challenges and traveled to Florida where they worked for Championship Wrestling from Florida. In Florida the Sheepherders came across their old arch enemies the Fabulous Ones, instantly rekindling their violent feud. This feud saw Luke and Butch end the Fabulous Ones' first reign with the NWA Florida United States Tag Team Championship; they kept the titles away from the Fabs until Lane and Keirn finally got the better of them on 30 November.

In 1987, the Sheepherders returned to the CWA once more. On 10 January, the New Zealanders beat the up-and-coming team of Badd Company (Pat Tanaka and Paul Diamond) for the CWA/AWA International Tag Team Championship. Unfortunately, they lost them back to Badd Company as fast as they had won them. After the quick run with Badd Company, the Sheepherders again became entangled in a feud with the Fabulous Ones in a rivalry that seemingly would never end. In what turned out to the last series of matches between the Sheepherders and the Fabulous Ones, the Fabs dominated the matches and again "ran off" the Sheepherders.

After leaving Memphis, the Sheepherders returned to Puerto Rico and the WWC. Here the Sheepherders started a bloody feud with Chris and Mark Youngblood that drew big crowds in Puerto Rico. The feud saw Luke and Butch win the WWC World Tag Team titles on 4 April and then defend them tooth and nail until the Youngbloods regained the gold on 10 May in a cage match. After their spring run with WWC, the Sheepherders returned to Florida and instantly became challengers for Mike Graham and Steve Keirn's NWA Florida Tag Team Championship. On 26 June, Luke and Butch added that title to their collection by brawling and cheating. Their run with the Florida titles came to an end on 29 August when Keirn and Graham regained the titles.

After losing the Florida titles, Luke and Butch returned to the UWF and started a second run with the UWF World Tag Team Championship after beating Brad Armstrong and Tim Horner on 16 October. The Sheepherders held the UWF tag team titles until the UWF was bought out by Jim Crockett and merged into Jim Crockett Promotions to form the forerunner of WCW. When the UWF merged Luke and Butch began working for JCP, participating in the third Jim Crockett, Sr. Memorial, Tag Team Tournament Cup losing to The Midnight Express (Bobby Eaton and Stan Lane) in the second round. At Clash of the Champions II, the Sheepherders faced off against the NWA United States Tag Team Champions the Fantastics, but did not win the gold. At Clash of the Champions III, the Sheepherders lost to Steve Williams and Nikita Koloff despite the interference of Rip Morgan. Just as it looked like the Sheepherders were going to face the Fantastics in the finals of a tournament to crown new United States tag team champions, Luke and Butch signed with Vince McMahon's World Wrestling Federation.

=== The Bushwhackers (1988–1996) ===
Luke and Butch signed on with the WWF in the midst of its aggressive national expansion giving them a national and international exposure unlike anything they had ever had before. The team changed their name to The Bushwhackers and changed their violent style to a comedic style which was an instant hit with the fans. The comedy act involved licking, arm motions, and more. The Bushwhackers made their debut on a matinee house show on 26 December 1988 facing The Bolsheviks.

In February, the Bushwhackers began a feud with The Fabulous Rougeau Brothers, the first feud to really feature the Bushwhackers on WWF television. The two teams took their conflict to WrestleMania V, which saw the Bushwhackers victorious in their WWF Pay Per View debut as a team. The WrestleMania match was not the end of the Bushwhackers/Rougeau feud, as the teams clashed again on 14 October Saturday Night's Main Event XXIII (taped 21 September); again, the Bushwhackers were victorious. The Bushwhackers and the Rougeaus clashed twice more, first at the 1989 Survivor Series and again at the 1990 Royal Rumble; the Bushwhackers got the best of the Rougeau brothers both times.

During this time, the Bushwhackers were featured in a long series of comedic vignettes, usually subjecting "Mean" Gene to their wild and wacky ways (and sardine eating antics). These vignettes were often shown between matches on Coliseum Home Video releases.

By 1990, the Bushwhackers were established as a solid mid-card comedy act feuding with the newly established heel team known as Rhythm and Blues (The Honky Tonk Man and Greg Valentine). The Bushwhackers' WrestleMania VI appearance came at the expense of Rhythm and Blues as they showed up during a segment, attacked Honky Tonk Man and Valentine, and then broke their opponents' guitars to the delight of the crowd. At Survivor Series 1990, Luke and Butch teamed up with Nikolai Volkoff and Tito Santana to form "The Alliance" and take on Sgt. Slaughter, Boris Zhukov, and the Orient Express team dubbed "The Mercenaries". The Bushwhackers eliminated the Orient Express but were eliminated themselves as well.

At the 1991 Royal Rumble, Luke set a record, lasting only 4 seconds. Using the trademark arm-swing entrance, he climbed into the ring, walked across in a straight path, and was thrown over the top rope by Earthquake. In a televised 6-man tag-team match, the Bushwhackers teamed with Tugboat against Earthquake and the Nasty Boys; Tugboat turned on his partners after a few minutes of action and joined Earthquake in laying the two New Zealanders out cold. After the heel turn Tugboat changed his name to Typhoon and together they became known as The Natural Disasters. The Bushwhackers demanded a chance to get even with the big team but were easily defeated at the 1991 SummerSlam PPV. After destroying the Bushwhackers, the Disasters targeted André the Giant who was at ringside on crutches due to an injury. The assault was stopped by the Legion of Doom who ran off the Natural Disasters.

After the Natural Disasters began feuding with the Legion of Doom, the Bushwhackers came across a team that was the total opposite of what they were. Luke and Butch the fun loving, "working class" guys started a feud with the rich, snobby bratty Beverly Brothers (Blake Beverly and Beau Beverly). The two teams first clashed at the 1991 Survivor Series where they were on opposite sides in a 4 on 4 elimination match. On that night, the Beverly Brothers got the upper hand and eliminated both Luke and Butch. The Beverly Brothers' manager The Genius kept interfering in the matches so the Bushwhackers brought in a manager of their own, the nerdy Jamison. Even the addition of Jamison was not enough to prevent the Beverly Brothers from winning at Royal Rumble 1992. In 1993, the Bushwhackers were used to "put over" the newly signed team the Headshrinkers (Fatu and Samu) and made a few appearances in comedy matches alongside midget "Tiger" Jackson (later Dink "The Clown") against the Beverly Brothers and "Little" Louie.

In November, Luke and Butch helped Doink the Clown in the clown's feud with Bam Bam Bigelow. Luke and Butch, as well as Mo and Mabel, all appeared at Survivor Series 1993 wearing the trademark green wig and facepaint associated with Doink the Clown. The Bushwhackers and Men on a Mission defeated Bigelow, Bastion Booger, and the Headshrinkers in a match that played more for laughs than serious wrestling. The team also faced Well Dunn, a recently signed team made up of Steven Dunn and Timothy Well. By 1995, the Bushwhackers were used almost exclusively to put over teams such as The Blu Twins. They also worked for United States Wrestling Association in Memphis, Tennessee.

In March 1996, the Bushwhackers returned and were beaten in the first round of a tournament for the tag titles by eventual winners The Bodydonnas (Skip and Zip). When the Bushwhackers returned, it was a slightly revamped version that ignored the fact that both members were from New Zealand as they displayed traditional Australian Stereotypes, including being accompanied to the ring by a giant kangaroo mascot. On 14 September, the Bushwhackers made their last appearance while under contract with the WWF.

=== Late career (1996–2002) ===
After leaving the WWF, the team made special appearances in the independent circuit. This included a return to WWC for its 24th-anniversary show, where they were billed as the Sheepherders and Los Pastores feuding with old rivals Invaders I & II. They also appeared at Terry Funk's WrestleFest in Amarillo to celebrate "50 years of Funk", where they lost to old rivals Mark and Chris Youngblood.

They made two appearances for Extreme Championship Wrestling in April 1998. They wrestled Tommy Dreamer and The Sandman to a no contest. Then wrestled Chris Chetti and Jerry Lynn.

In 1999, Luke and Butch participated in a "wrestling nostalgia" PPV called Heroes of Wrestling as the Men from Down Under. They took on and defeated former WWF Tag Team Champions The Iron Sheik and Nikolai Volkoff. They also wrestled in the UK in 2000, mainly for All Star Wrestling where they appeared in six man tags, teaming with Frank Casey who for some years had been performing as tribute act the "British Bushwhacker." Luke and Butch made one of their last appearances as active wrestlers on 1 April 2001, when they participated in the "Gimmick Battle Royal" at WrestleMania X-Seven. On 15 June, the team returned to Memphis one last time, fighting The Moondogs to a double Disqualification on a special "Mid-South Clash of the Legends" show. Butch retired in September 2001 after suffering a neck injury.

In 2002, Luke started working behind the scenes as a booker in IWA Puerto Rico, retiring from active competition.

=== Return to wrestling (2007–present) ===
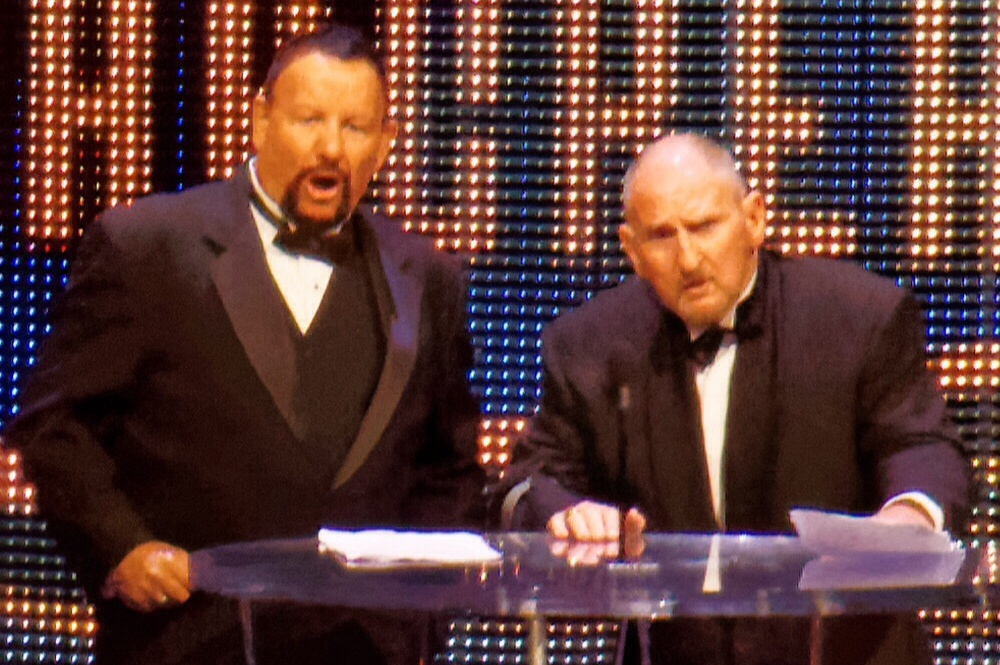
Luke (left) and Butch being inducted into the WWE Hall of Fame in 2015

Luke made appearances with Ring of Honor starting with the final two shows in 2007, Rising Above and Final Battle. Luke hosted the Luke Williams show for Ring of Honor podcasts where he interviews ROH wrestlers.

In December 2007, Wickens again appeared on a wrestling program as Bushwhacker Luke. Wrestler Eric Young hosted a party on the Christmas-themed episode of Impact, and his family turned out to be the Bushwhackers.

On 9 January 2008 in Adrian Michigan Luke made his in-ring return after 6 years out of the ring. He teamed with Big Chuck Wagon and lost to the BNU in the first round of a tag team titles tournament for Championship International Wrestling.

On 26 July 2008 in Detroit, Michigan Luke participated in the first ever Honor Rumble where the winner received a future ROH World Title shot. He was eliminated by Necro Butcher.

In September 2013 in Toronto, Ontario, Canada Luke teamed with Odjig Thundercloud and defeated the Royal Guards to capture the Victory Commonwealth Wrestling Tag Team Championships.

On 23 February 2015, it was announced by WWE that The Bushwhackers would be 2015 inductees into the WWE Hall of Fame. On 28 March 2015, they both attended the event to accept their induction.

In February 2018, the Bushwhackers reunited for one last tour of their native New Zealand. On 10 February, Bushwhacker Luke defeated Simon Seven at UCW's Invasion show, in Christchurch as well as defeating James Shaw at IPW's Kiwi as mate show, in Auckland.

On 11 September 2021, Luke defeated Gangrel at an event honoring the heroes of 9/11 in Ocala, Florida.

On 24 May 2025, he was shown alongside Jimmy Hart in the crowd during Saturday Night's Main Event XXXIX.

As of 2026, Luke still wrestles at 79.

== Other media ==
The Bushwhackers released their autobiography "The Bushwhackers: Blood, Sweat & Cheers", along with writer John E. Crowther, on 27 September 2022.

== Championships and accomplishments ==
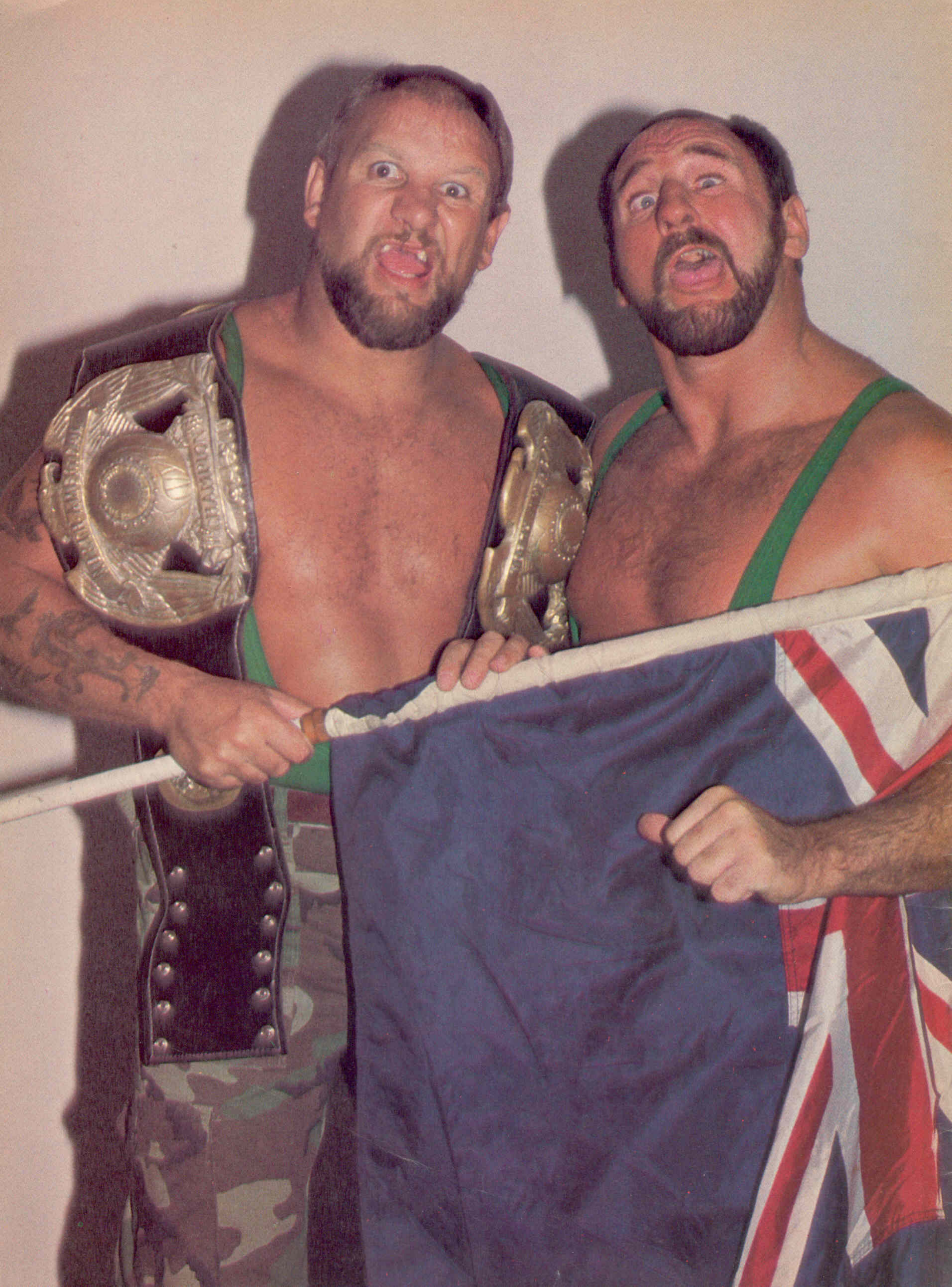
Luke (left) and Butch (right) as WWC World Tag Team Champions, c. 1985

- Allied Powers Wrestling Federation
  - APWF Tag Team Championship (1 time) - with Butch Miller
- Can-Am Wrestling
  - Can-Am Tag Team Championship (1 time) - with Butch Miller
- Cauliflower Alley Club
  - Tag Team Award (2025) - with Butch Miller
- Continental Wrestling Association
  - CWA International Tag Team Championship (1 time) – with Butch Miller
- Championship Wrestling from Florida
  - NWA Florida Tag Team Championship (1 time) - with Butch Miller
  - NWA United States Tag Team Championship (Florida version) (1 time) - with Butch Miller
- Continental Wrestling Association
  - AWA Southern Tag Team Championship (2 times) - with Jonathan Boyd
- Flemish Wrestling Force
  - Flemish Wrestling Cup (2013)
- International Professional Wrestling Hall of Fame
  - Class of 2026
- International Wrestling Association
  - IWA Tag Team Championship (1 time) - with Butch Miller
- International Professional Wrestling Hall of Fame
  - Class of 2026 - as a member of The Bushwhackers
- Mid-Atlantic Championship Wrestling
  - NWA Mid-Atlantic Tag Team Championship (1 time) - with Butch Miller
- Laredo Wrestling Alliance
  - LWA Hall of Fame (Class of 2012)
- NWA All-Star Wrestling
  - NWA Canadian Tag Team Championship (Vancouver version) (1 time) - with Butch Miller
- Pacific Northwest Wrestling
  - NWA Pacific Northwest Tag Team Championship (3 times) - with Butch Miller
- Professional Wrestling Hall of Fame and Museum
  - Class of 2020 - Inducted as a part of The Bushwhackers with Butch Miller.
- Ring Around The Northwest Newsletter
  - Tag Team of the Year (1979–1980) with Butch Miller
- Southeast Championship Wrestling
  - NWA Southeastern Tag Team Championship (1 time) - with Jonathan Boyd
  - NWA Southeastern United States Junior Heavyweight Championship (1 time)
- Sooner World Class Wrestling
  - SWCW Championship (1 time)
- Southwest Championship Wrestling
  - SCW Southwest Tag Team Championship (2 times) - with Jonathan Boyd (1) and Bobby Jaggers (1)
  - SCW World Tag Team Championship (1 time) - with Butch Miller
- Stampede Wrestling
  - NWA International Tag Team Championship (Calgary version) (2 times) - with Butch Miller
- Steeltown Pro Wrestling
  - SPW Provincial Championship (1 time)
- Ultimate Championship Wrestling
  - UCW Tag Team Championship (2 times) - with The Honky Tonk Man and The Maritime Menace
- Ultimate Championship Wrestling (Virginia)
  - UCW Tag Team Championship (1 time) - with Butch Miller
- United States Wrestling League
  - USWL Tag Team Championship (1 time) - with Butch Miller
- Universal Wrestling Federation
  - UWF World Tag Team Championship (2 times) - with Butch Miller
- Victory Commonwealth Wrestling
  - VCW Tag Team Championship (1 time) - with Odjig Thundercloud
- World Wide Wrestling Alliance
  - WWWA Tag Team Championship (2 times) - with Butch Miller
- World Wrestling Council
  - WWC North American Tag Team Championship (4 times) - with Butch Miller
  - WWC World Tag Team Championship (2 times) - with Butch Miller
- WWE
  - WWE Hall of Fame (Class of 2015) - as a member of The Bushwhackers
- Pro Wrestling Illustrated
  - PWI ranked him #363 of the 500 best singles wrestlers during the PWI Years in 2003.
  - PWI ranked him #71 of the 100 best tag teams of the "PWI Years" with Butch Miller in 2003.
- Wrestling Observer Newsletter
  - Worst Tag Team (1992, 1994) with Butch Miller
  - Worst Worked Match of the Year (1993) with Butch Miller and Men on a Mission vs. The Headshrinkers, Bastion Booger, and Bam Bam Bigelow at Survivor Series
