= Bushwhacker Butch =

New Zealand professional wrestler (1944–2023)

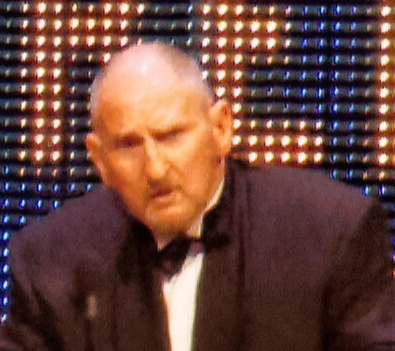
- Butch at the WWE Hall of Fame induction ceremony in 2015

Personal information
- Born: Robert Miller; 21 October 1944 Auckland, New Zealand
- Died: 2 April 2023 (aged 78) Los Angeles, California, U.S.

Professional wrestling career
- Ring name(s): Butch Miller "Butch" Doink; Cousin Butch; Nick Carter; Bushwhacker Butch; Cousin Butch Dudley; The Tiger; Detroit Assassin
- Billed height: 1.80 m (5 ft 11 in)
- Billed weight: 113 kg (249 lb)
- Billed from: Auckland, New Zealand
- Debut: 1964
- Retired: 8 September 2001

Robert Miller (21 October 1944 – 2 April 2023) was a New Zealand professional wrestler. He was best known for his appearances in the World Wrestling Federation under the ring name Bushwhacker Butch, where he teamed with Bushwhacker Luke as The Bushwhackers. He was also known for his appearances under the ring name Butch Miller for promotions such as NWA New Zealand, Stampede Wrestling, Pacific Northwest Wrestling, Mid Atlantic Championship Wrestling, Southwest Championship Wrestling, and the Universal Wrestling Federation, where he teamed with Luke as The Kiwis and The Sheepherders.

Along with Luke, Butch held championships including the NWA Florida Tag Team Championship, NWA Mid-Atlantic Tag Team Championship, NWA Pacific Northwest Tag Team Championship, and UWF World Tag Team Championship. The duo was inducted into the WWE Hall of Fame in 2015 and the Professional Wrestling Hall of Fame and Museum in 2020.

== Professional wrestling career ==
=== Early career (1964–1974) ===
Butch Miller started wrestling for NWA New Zealand (later known as All-Star Pro Wrestling) in 1964 where he achieved a great deal of regional success. Miller, along with his friend Luke Williams, was brought to America in 1965 by fellow New Zealander Steve Rickard, who was also the booker for NWA Hawaii. Luke and Butch initially worked in Canada among others for Stu Hart's Stampede Wrestling billed as "The Kiwis" (Butch was known as "Nick Carter" and Luke was known as "Sweet William"). The first recorded title that the Kiwis won was in 1974 when the duo beat Bob Pringle and Bill Cody for the Stampede International Tag Team Championship on 6 January 1974. The Kiwis lost the titles to Tokyo Joe and the Great Saki only to regain them a short time later. The Kiwis lost the titles for good when Stan Kowalski and Duke Savage defeated them and kept the titles away from them in subsequent rematches.

=== The Sheepherders (1974–1981) ===
After leaving Stampede Wrestling, the Kiwis began doing double duty in Japan for International Wrestling Enterprise. In 1975, they returned to New Zealand for the first wrestling television tapings On the Mat. Both men were inactive from wrestling for a few years.

In 1979, both men reunited working for NWA Pacific Northwest as well as the Canadian-based International All-Star Wrestling around 1979–1980 as "the Kiwi Sheepherders". In 1979, the team won the NWA Pacific Northwest Tag Team Championship on three occasions between 21 July and 5 August 1980 before they left the territory. On 22 September, the Sheepherders lost the gold to Dutch Savage and Stan Stasiak only to regain it a week later. On 11 February 1980, the Sheepherders became double champions when they downed Dutch Savage and Stasiak once again, this time for the NWA Canadian Tag Team Championship. Top faces Rick Martel and "Rowdy" Roddy Piper teamed up in May 1980 to take the NWA Canadian tag titles from the Sheepherders and, in effect, ran the duo out of the Northwest region by August, gaining the NWA Pacific Northwest tag titles when the Sheepherders left the promotion.

The next stop for the Sheepherders was a brief stay in the Mid Atlantic Championship Wrestling territory run by Jim Crockett. In MACW, the two won the NWA Mid-Atlantic Tag Team Championship by beating Matt Borne and Buzz Sawyer for the gold. The Sheepherders held onto the gold for close to three months before dropping it to Dewey Robertson and George Wells on 12 December. After losing the titles, Luke and Butch headed for warmer weather as they traveled to Puerto Rico and began working for the World Wrestling Council as "Los Pastores". While in Puerto Rico, the team would win the WWC North American Tag Team Championship twice while touring the island.

After the team left WWC, Butch decided that he wanted to return closer to home and went to Australia to wrestle. Luke remained in the United States determined to keep the "Sheepherders" name on everyone's lips by teaming up with "Lord" Jonathan Boyd (formerly of the Royal Kangaroos).

=== Butch returns (1983–1988) ===
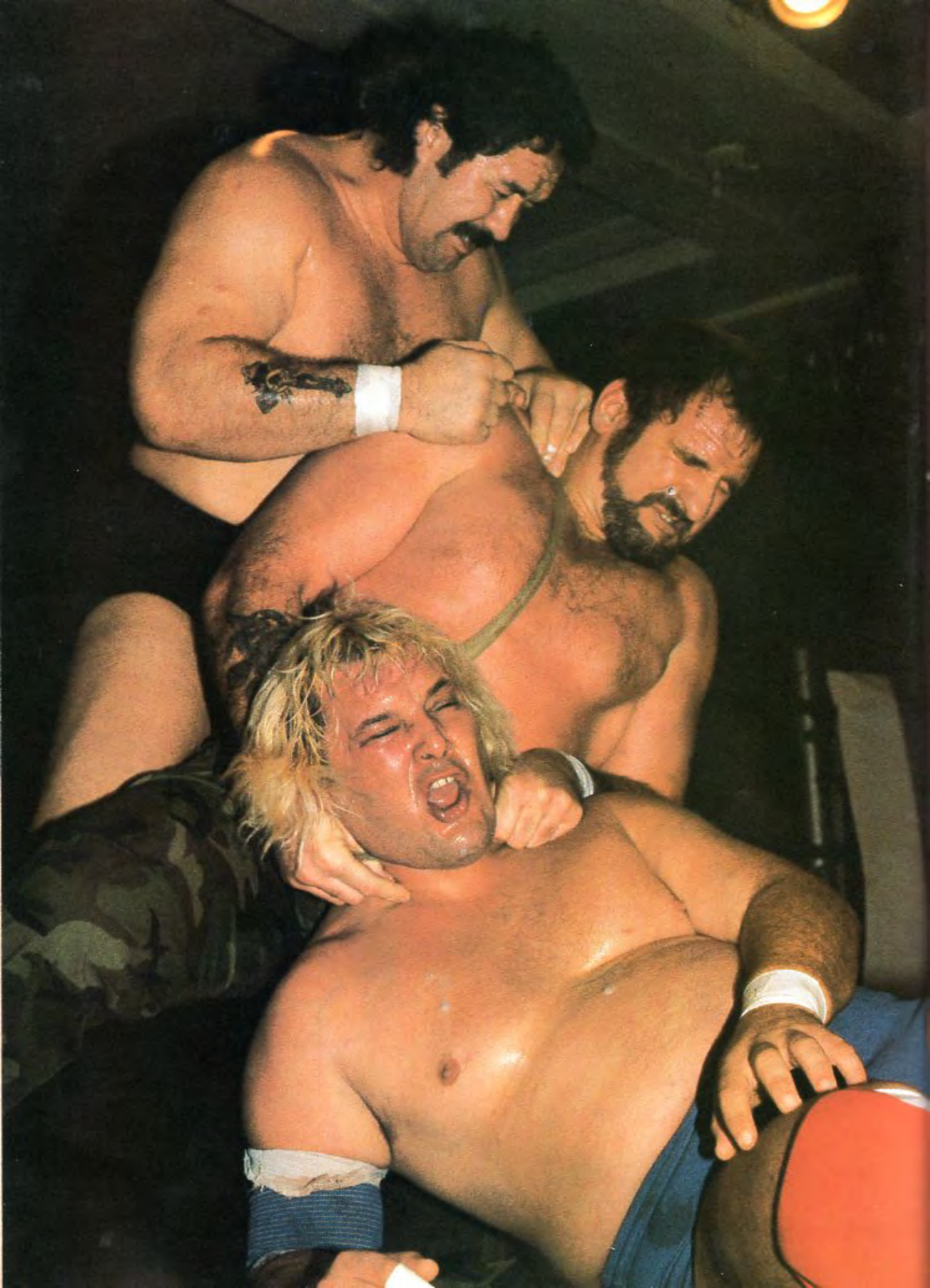
Butch (centre) wrestling Manny Fernandez (top) and Bobby Jaggers (bottom), c. 1984

In 1983, Boyd and Williams were working for Southwest Championship Wrestling when in June, Jonathan Boyd legitimately broke his leg in a car accident. While Boyd was out with the broken leg Butch returned from Australia to reunite with his old tag-team partner.

Luke and Butch stayed with the SWCW through the rest of 1983 and into 1984, when the two came head-to-head with the Fabulous Ones, a team Williams and Boyd had feuded with extensively while Miller was away. This time the prize was the SWCW World Tag Team Championship. The Fabulous Ones had supposedly won the titles in Australia, which is generally believed to be a fictitious tournament invented by the SWCW. The Sheepherders defeated the Fabs on 4 March and held the titles until the SWCW abandoned the tag team titles in September 1984. The next major stop for the Sheepherders was a return to Puerto Rico and the WWC, this time competing as "The Sheepherders" instead of "Los Pastores". On 6 January 1985 the team defeated The Invaders (Invader I and Invader III) for the WWC North American Tag Team Championship in Bayamon, Puerto Rico. Butch and Luke lost and then regained the titles from Invaders I and III in March and then held on to the gold until August, when the Invaders won the tag team title back for good.

When Luke and Butch returned to mainland USA and signed on with Bill Watts’ UWF, they quickly cemented their status by beating Ted DiBiase and Steve Williams for the UWF Tag Team Championship on 16 March 1986. The Sheepherders worked for Bill Watts on and off over the next couple of years, taking time out to participate in the first ever Jim Crockett Memorial Tag Team Cup where they made it to the third round. In the third round the Sheepherders clashed with the Fantastics in an out-of-control brawl that ended in a double disqualification. The winners of this match would have gone on to face eventual tournament winners The Road Warriors in the next round. Back in the UWF for their "Mid South Superdome Show", the Sheepherders clashed with the Fantastics once more, this time Luke and Butch lost in a "New Zealand Boot camp" match to the UWF Tag champs.

After being unable to beat the Fantastics on several occasions, the Sheepherders traveled back to Puerto Rico during the summer for a six-week run with the WWC World Tag Team Championship on 3 August. When their short run with WWC ended, Luke and Butch sought new challenges and traveled to Florida where they worked for Championship Wrestling from Florida. While there, the Sheepherders came across their old rivals the Fabulous Ones, instantly rekindling their violent feud. This feud saw Luke and Butch end the Fabulous Ones' first reign with the NWA Florida United States Tag Team Championship and would keep them away from the Fabulous Ones until Lane and Keirn finally got the better of them on 30 November, when they regained the belts.

In 1987, the Sheepherders returned to the CWA once more. On 10 January, the New Zealanders beat the up-and-coming team of Badd Company (Pat Tanaka and Paul Diamond) for the CWA/AWA International Tag Team Championship but lost them back to Badd Company as fast as they had won them. After the quick run with Badd Company, the Sheepherders once again became entangled in a feud with the Fabulous Ones in a rivalry that seemingly would never end. In what turned out to be the last series of matches between the Sheepherders and the Fabulous Ones, the Fabulous Ones dominated the matches and once again "ran off" the Sheepherders.

After leaving Memphis the Sheepherders returned to Puerto Rico and the WWC. Here the Sheepherders started a bloody feud with Chris and Mark Youngblood that drew big crowds in Puerto Rico. The feud saw Luke and Butch win the WWC World Tag Team titles on 4 April and then defend them tooth and nail until the Youngbloods regained the gold on 10 May in a cage match. After their spring run with WWC the Sheepherders returned to Florida and instantly became challengers for Mike Graham and Steve Keirn's NWA Florida Tag Team Championship. On 26 June, Luke and Butch added that title to their collection by brawling and cheating. Their run with the Florida titles came to an end on 29 August when Keirn and Graham regained the titles.

After losing the Florida titles, Luke and Butch returned to the UWF and started a second run with the UWF World Tag Team Championship after beating Brad Armstrong and Tim Horner on 16 October. The Sheepherders held the UWF tag team titles until the UWF was bought out by Jim Crockett and merged into Jim Crockett Promotions to form the forerunner of World Championship Wrestling. When the UWF merged Luke and Butch began working for JCP, participating in the third Jim Crockett Sr. Memorial, Tag Team Tournament Cup losing to The Midnight Express (Bobby Eaton and Stan Lane) in the second round. At Clash of the Champions II the Sheepherders faced off against the NWA United States Tag Team Champions Fantastics, but did not win the gold. At Clash of the Champions III the Sheepherders lost to Steve Williams and Nikita Koloff despite the interference of Rip Morgan. Just as it looked like the Sheepherders were going to face the Fantastics in the finals of a tournament to crown new United States tag team champions, Luke and Butch signed with Vince McMahon's World Wrestling Federation.

=== The Bushwhackers (1988–1996) ===
Luke and Butch signed on with the WWF in the midst of its national expansion, giving them a national and international exposure unlike anything they had ever had before. The team changed their name to "The Bushwhackers" and changed their violent style to a comedic style which was an instant hit with the fans. The comedy act involved licking, arm motions and more. The Bushwhackers made their debut on a matinee house show on 26 December 1988 facing The Bolsheviks.

Throughout the Bushwhackers' run in the WWF, the team was a solid mid-card team, feuding against such teams as The Fabulous Rougeau Brothers, Rhythm and Blues (The Honky Tonk Man and Greg Valentine), The Natural Disasters, The Beverly Brothers, The Headshrinkers and Well Dunn. Several of the feuds were comedy-oriented, with the Bushwhackers' antagonists expressing disdain for their wild and wacky ways. In addition, Butch (along with Luke) participated in a long-running series of comedy vignettes, with "Mean" Gene Okerlund their usual foil; these vignettes were often featured on Coliseum Home Video releases where they served as the "link" between matches.

The Bushwhackers remained in the WWF through 1996, by which time they were a lower-card team and frequently used to job to newer teams such as The Blu Brothers and The Bodydonnas. Late in the Bushwhackers' run, the team was accompanied to the ring by a giant kangaroo mascot.

=== Late career (1996–2001) ===
After leaving the WWF, the team made special appearances in the independent circuit, including a return to WWC for its 24th-anniversary show where they were billed as the Sheepherders and took on old rivals Invaders I & II. They also appeared at Terry Funk's WrestleFest in Amarillo to celebrate "50 years of Funk" where they lost to Mark and Chris Youngblood.

In 1999, Luke and Butch participated in a "wrestling nostalgia" pay-per-view called Heroes of Wrestling as the Men from Down Under. They defeated former WWF Tag Team Champions The Iron Sheik and Nikolai Volkoff. They also wrestled in the UK in 2000, mainly for All Star Wrestling where they appeared in six man tags, teaming with Frank Casey who for some years had been performing as tribute act the "British Bushwhacker." Luke and Butch made one of their last appearances as active wrestlers on 1 April 2001 when they participated in the "Gimmick Battle Royal" at WrestleMania X7. On 15 June, the team returned to Memphis one last time, fighting The Moondogs to a double disqualification on a special "Mid-South Clash of the Legends" show. In September 2001 he retired from wrestling.

=== Retirement (2001–2023) ===
In September 2001, Miller was rushed to the hospital after suffering a neck injury. While in the hospital, he also had a brush with sepsis, but he survived. Miller retired after the incident and moved back to New Zealand where he began working as the commissioner for NZWPW and also wrote a column for NZPWI.CO.NZ. He lived in Paraparaumu Beach and was the Commissioner for Kiwi Pro Wrestling.

When the WWE came to New Zealand on 11 June 2008 in Auckland, he was a guest on the first international V.I.P Lounge along with Tony Garea. The segment's host, Montel Vontavious Porter (MVP) announced him as Bushwhacker Luke but then apologized. Eventually, MVP attacked Butch and Garea with the microphone. Butch and Garea recovered and fought off MVP, then celebrated with the Bushwhacker walk.

In 2015, The Bushwhackers were inducted into the WWE Hall of Fame by John Laurinaitis.

In February 2018, the Bushwhackers reunited for one last tour of their native New Zealand. Only Luke wrestled.

== Personal life and death ==
Miller moved back to New Zealand from Florida in 2003. He wanted to be back in New Zealand with his 2 daughters, Sharon and Kirstin who he lived for. Both daughters to his childhood sweetheart and wife, lived with their Dad and husband in Canada and America throughout his career. He retired in Paraparaumu Beach where he met his third wife.

Miller suffered from health issues as early as 2002 when he stayed in the ICU. In 2010, he returned to the ICU. Luke Williams kept it private from the public regarding what issue Miller had.

Miller died in hospital in Los Angeles, California on 2 April 2023, at the age of 78. He had traveled to the city in order to participate in WrestleMania 39 festivities. Even though he knew the risks, he knew he was going to the place he loved the most surrounded by his best friend Luke.

== Other media ==
The Bushwhackers appeared as themselves in a 1994 episode of the sitcom Family Matters, wrestling against Carl Winslow and Steve Urkel, who are forced to fill in for and wrestle as "The Psycho Twins". The Bushwhackers released their autobiography "The Bushwhackers: Blood, Sweat & Cheers", along with writer John E. Crowther, on 27 September 2022.

== Championships and accomplishments ==
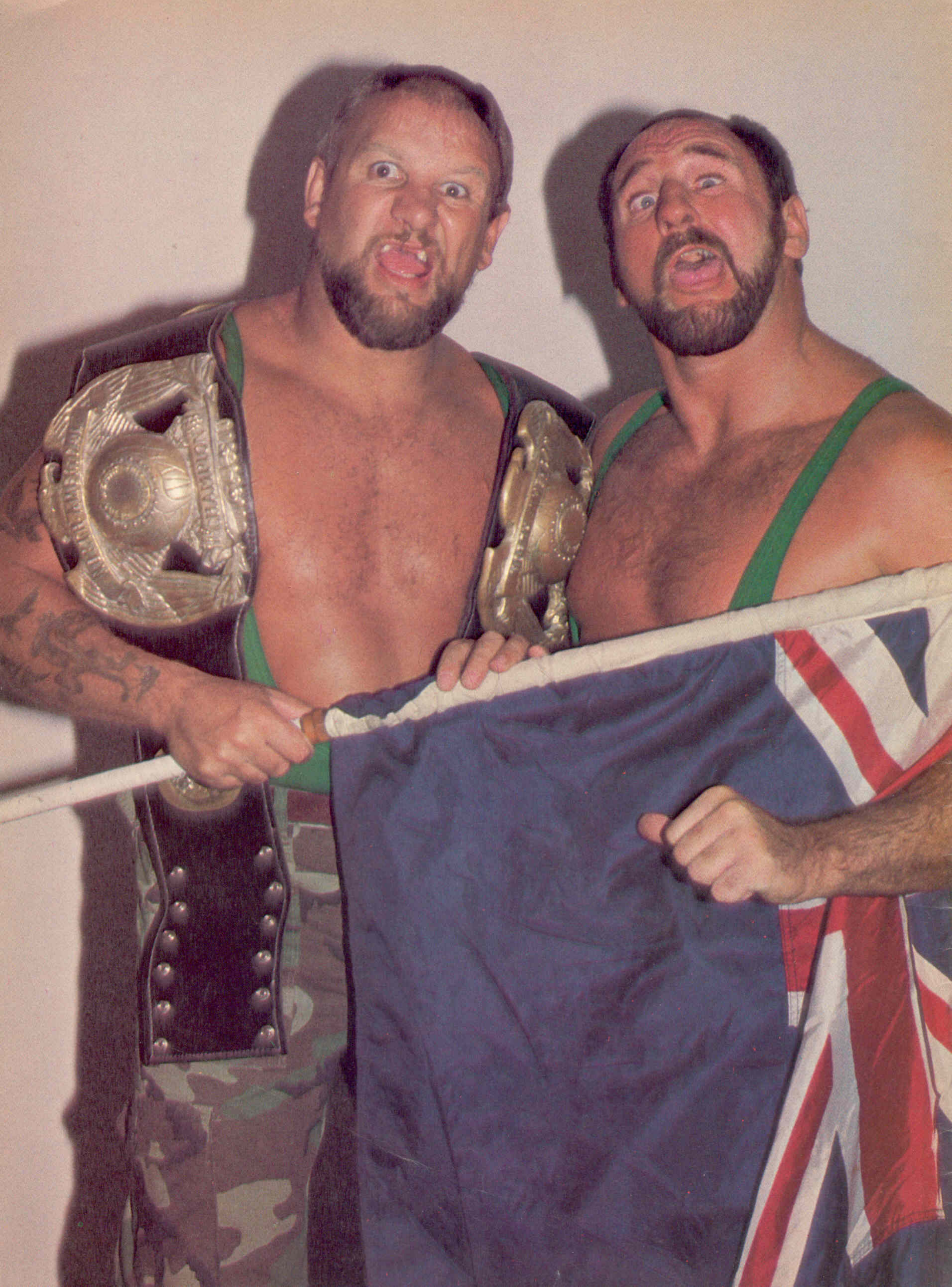
Butch (right) and Luke (left) as WWC World Tag Team Champions, c. 1985

- Allied Powers Wrestling Federation
  - APWF Tag Team Championship (1 time) – with Luke Williams
- Can-Am Wrestling
  - Can-Am Tag Team Championship (1 time) – with Luke Williams
- Cauliflower Alley Club
  - Tag Team Award (2025) – with Luke Williams
- Continental Wrestling Association
  - CWA International Tag Team Championship (1 time) – with Luke Williams
- Championship Wrestling from Florida
  - NWA Florida Tag Team Championship (1 time) – with Luke Williams
  - NWA United States Tag Team Championship (Florida version) (1 time) – with Luke Williams
- International Wrestling Association
  - IWA Tag Team Championship (1 time) – with Luke Williams
- International Professional Wrestling Hall of Fame
  - Class of 2026 - as a member of The Bushwhackers
- Mid-Atlantic Championship Wrestling
  - NWA Mid-Atlantic Tag Team Championship (1 time) – with Luke Williams
- NWA All-Star Wrestling
  - NWA Canadian Tag Team Championship (Vancouver version) (1 time) – with Luke Williams
- Pacific Northwest Wrestling
  - NWA Pacific Northwest Tag Team Championship (3 times) – with Luke Williams
- Pro Wrestling Illustrated
  - PWI ranked him # 493 of the 500 best singles wrestlers during the "PWI Years" in 2003
  - PWI ranked him # 71 of the 100 best tag teams of the "PWI Years" with Luke Williams in 2003
- Professional Wrestling Hall of Fame and Museum
  - Class of 2020 – Inducted as part of The Bushwhackers with Luke Williams.
- Ring Around The Northwest Newsletter
  - Tag Team of the Year (1979–1980) with Luke Williams
- Southwest Championship Wrestling
  - SCW Southwest Tag Team Championship (1 time) – with Luke Williams
  - SCW World Tag Team Championship (1 time) – with Luke Williams
- Stampede Wrestling
  - NWA International Tag Team Championship (Calgary version) (2 times) – with Luke Williams
- Ultimate Championship Wrestling
  - UCW Tag Team Championship (1 time) – with Luke Williams
- United States Wrestling League
  - USWL Tag Team Championship (1 time) – with Luke Williams
- Universal Wrestling Federation
  - UWF World Tag Team Championship (2 times) – with Luke Williams
- World Wide Wrestling Alliance
  - WWA Tag Team Championship (2 times) – with Luke Williams
- World Wrestling Council
  - WWC North American Tag Team Championship (1 time) – with Luke Williams
  - WWC World Tag Team Championship (2 times) – with Luke Williams
- Wrestling Observer Newsletter
  - Worst Tag Team (1992, 1994) with Luke Williams
  - Worst Worked Match of the Year (1993) with Luke Williams and Men on a Mission vs. The Headshrinkers, Bastion Booger, and Bam Bam Bigelow at Survivor Series
- WWE
  - WWE Hall of Fame (Class of 2015) - as a member of The Bushwhackers
