= Terry Funk's WrestleFest =

1997 Extreme Championship Wrestling live event

- Promotion: Extreme Championship Wrestling
- Date: September 11, 1997
- City: Amarillo, Texas, US
- Venue: Tri-State Fairgrounds Coliseum
- Attendance: c. 3,800
- Tagline: 50 Years of Funk

Event chronology
← Previous; Born to be Wired	Next → As Good as It Gets

Terry Funk's WrestleFest: 50 Years of Funk was a professional wrestling live event produced by Extreme Championship Wrestling (ECW) on September 11, 1997. The event was held to mark the retirement of Terry Funk. In addition to ECW wrestlers, it featured Bret Hart and Mankind from the World Wrestling Federation, along with multiple wrestlers from Frontier Martial-Arts Wrestling.

The event was held in the Tri-State Fairgrounds Coliseum in Amarillo, Texas (Funk's adopted hometown) in the United States. The event was released on VHS and on DVD in 2002, while excerpts from the main event featured in the 1999 documentary Beyond the Mat. The main event was later made available for streaming on the WWE Network.

Funk broke his retirement 11 days later on September 22, 1997, wrestling in Frontier Martial-Arts Wrestling.

== Event ==
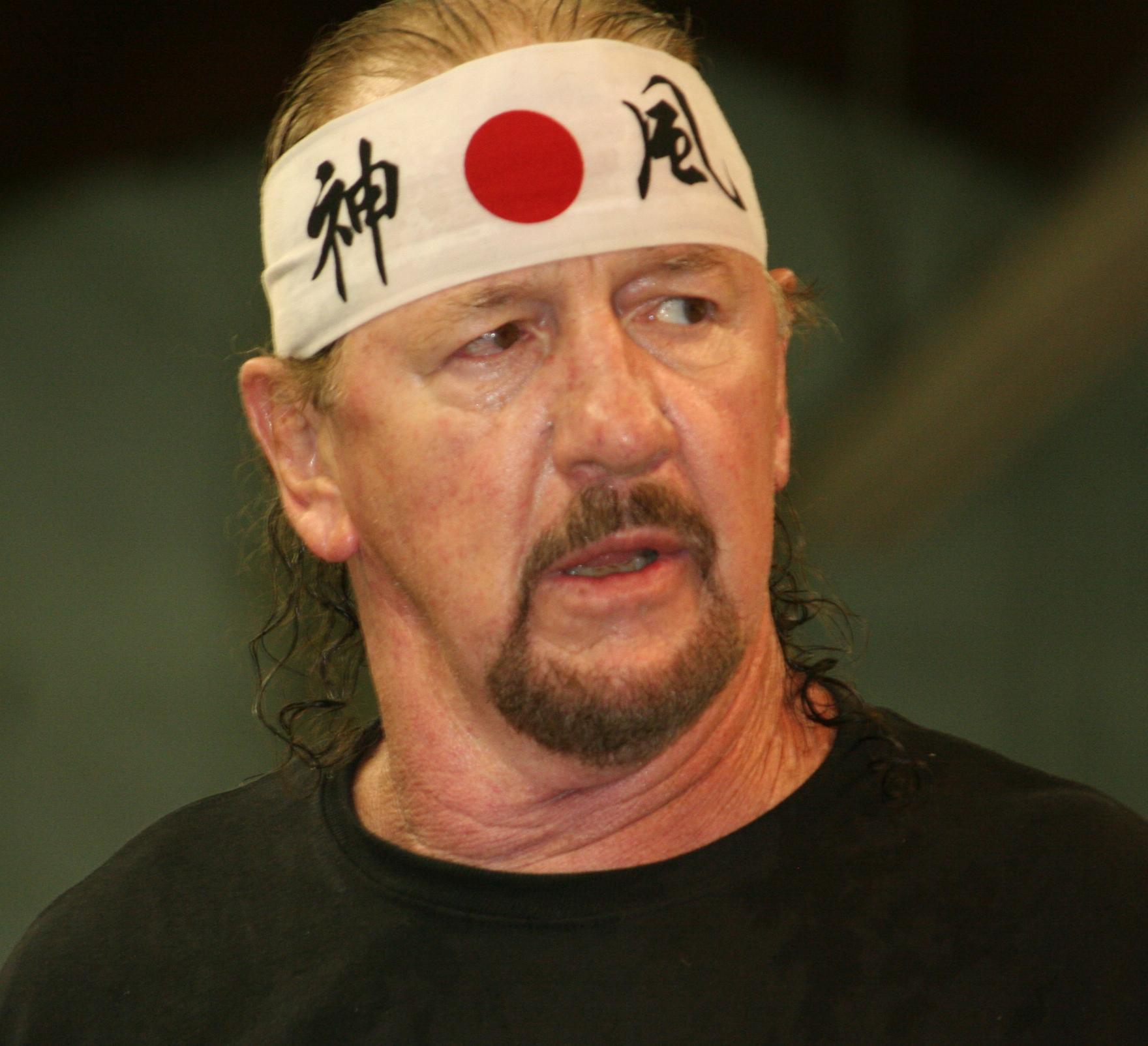
Terry Funk's WrestleFest was held to mark the retirement of veteran wrestler Terry Funk.

The commentator for Terry Funk's WrestleFest was Joey Styles. It was attended by approximately 3,800 people.

The event began with a moment of silence for Fritz Von Erich, who had died on the previous day.

The opening bout was a singles match in which W*ING Kanemura defeated Roadkill by pinfall following a diving senton.

The second bout saw ECW World Television Champion Taz defend his title against Chris Candido. Taz defeated Candido by submission using the Tazmission to retain his title.

The third bout was a singles match between Lady Cooga and Shark Tsuchiya. Tsuchiya defeated Cooga by pinfall following a series of stiff clotheslines.

The fourth bout was a tag team match between the Bushwhackers and the Youngbloods. The Youngbloods won the bout after Mark Youngblood pinned Butch after Chris Youngblood dropkicked him while Butch was holding him.

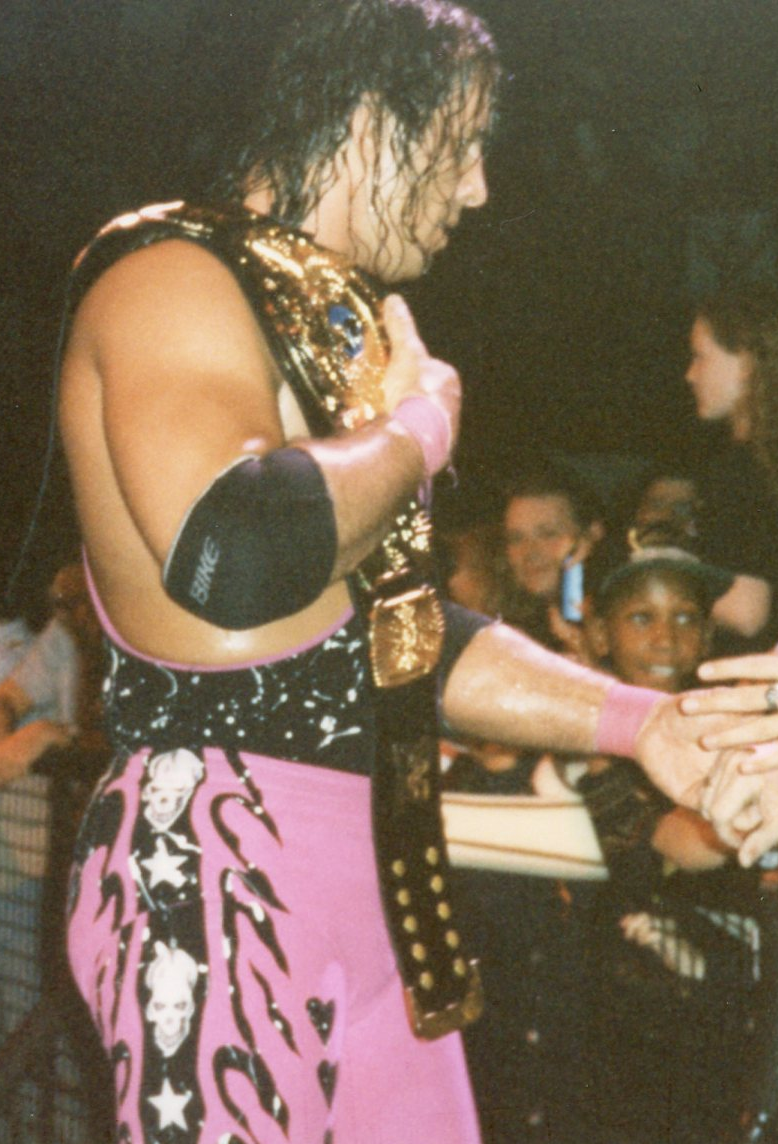
WWF Champion Bret Hart faced Terry Funk in the main event of Terry Funk's WrestleFest.

The fifth bout was scheduled to be a singles match between Balls Mahoney and the Sandman. After Buh Buh Ray Dudley attacked the Sandman while he was making his entrance, the match was changed to a no disqualification match between Dudley and Mahoney. Mahoney defeated Dudley by pinfall after hitting him with the Sandman's Singapore cane.

The sixth bout saw ECW World Heavyweight Champion Shane Douglas defend his title against Tommy Dreamer. Douglas defeated Dreamer by pinfall following a belly-to-belly suplex with assistance from his valet, Francine.

The seventh bout was a singles match between Dory Funk Jr. - Terry Funk's brother - and Rob Van Dam. Funk defeated Van Dam by pinfall after a belly to back suplex followed by an inside cradle. This bout was not included on some versions of the VHS/DVD.

The eighth bout was a singles match between Mankind and Sabu. At the time of the match, Mankind was working for the World Wrestling Federation. Mankind won the bout by disqualification after Sabu's manager Bill Alfonso attacked him.

The ninth bout was a six-man tag team match pitting Hakushi, Hayabusa, and Masato Tanaka against the Headhunters and Jake Roberts. The match ended when Hayabusa performed the 450° splash on one of the Headhunters and then pinned him.

The main event was a no disqualification match between Bret Hart and Terry Funk in what was billed as Funk's retirement match. The referee for the bout was Funk's friend Dennis Stamp. At the time of the match, Hart was working for the World Wrestling Federation, where he was the WWF Champion; Hart wrestled at the event at the request of Dory Funk Jr.. Before the match began, the ECW roster and Funk's family came to the ring. ECW promoter Paul Heyman gave a speech in which he thanked Funk for his support for ECW, while Tommy Dreamer presented Funk with a "Lifetime ECW Championship". Hart went to defeat Funk in an "old school" match by pinfall after lifting his shoulder when Funk performed a bridging belly-to-back suplex on him, resulting in Funk effectively pinning himself.

== Results ==
No.	Results	Stipulations	Times
1	W*ING Kanemura defeated Roadkill by pinfall	Singles match	5:45
2	Taz (c) defeated Chris Candido by submission	Singles match for the ECW World Television Championship	7:00
3	Shark Tsuchiya defeated Lady Cooga by pinfall	Singles match	6:56
4	The Youngbloods (Chris Youngblood and Mark Youngblood) (with Ricky Romero) defeated the Bushwhackers (Butch and Luke) by pinfall	Tag team match	9:15
5	Balls Mahoney (with the Sandman) defeated Buh Buh Ray Dudley by pinfall	No disqualification match	6:49
6	Shane Douglas (with Francine) (c) defeated Tommy Dreamer (with Beulah McGillicutty) by pinfall	Singles match for the ECW World Heavyweight Championship	9:58
7	Dory Funk Jr. defeated Rob Van Dam (with Bill Alfonso) by pinfall	Singles match	11:32
8	Mankind defeated Sabu (with Bill Alfonso) by disqualification	Singles match	9:06
9	Hakushi, Hayabusa, and Masato Tanaka defeated the Headhunters (Headhunter A and Headhunter B) (with Víctor Quiñones) and Jake Roberts by pinfall	Six-man tag team match	12:05
10	Bret Hart (with Bruce Hart) defeated Terry Funk (with Dory Funk Jr.) by pinfall	No disqualification match	25:12
(c) / – the champion(s) heading into the match
