= WrestleFest =

WrestleFest may refer to:

- Terry Funk's WrestleFest, a 1997 professional wrestling event
- WWF WrestleFest, a 1991 professional wrestling arcade game
