= SCW World Tag Team Championship =

Professional wrestling tag team championship

Details
- Promotion: Southwest Championship Wrestling
- Date established: August 1980
Statistics
- First champions: Dory Funk Jr. and Terry Funk
- Final champions: The Sheepherders (Luke Williams and Butch Miller)
- Most reigns: Tully Blanchard and Gino Hernandez (2 reigns)

The SCW World Tag Team Championship was the top tag team championship in Southwest Championship Wrestling from its establishment in 1980 until 1984, when the title was abandoned.

== History ==
Wrestler:	Times:	Date:	Location:	Notes:
Dory Jr. and Terry Funk	1	c. August 1980		Billed as champions on arrival
Wahoo McDaniel and Ivan Putski	1	c. May 1981	San Antonio, TX	Defeat Dory Funk Jr. and Larry Lane, subbing for injured Terry Funk
Tully Blanchard and Gino Hernandez	1	c. August 1981	?	
Manny Fernandez and Chavo Guerrero	1	?	?	
Tully Blanchard and Gino Hernandez	2	?	?	
Bruiser Brody and Dick Slater	1	1982	Houston, TX	
Vacant				Title vacant
The Fabulous Ones (Stan Lane and Steve Keirn)	1	March 1984	Australia	Win fictitious tournament
The Sheepherders (Luke Williams and Butch Miller)	1	March 4, 1984	San Antonio, TX	
Title retired		September 1984		Title abandoned
