= Stan Lane =

American professional wrestler (born 1953)

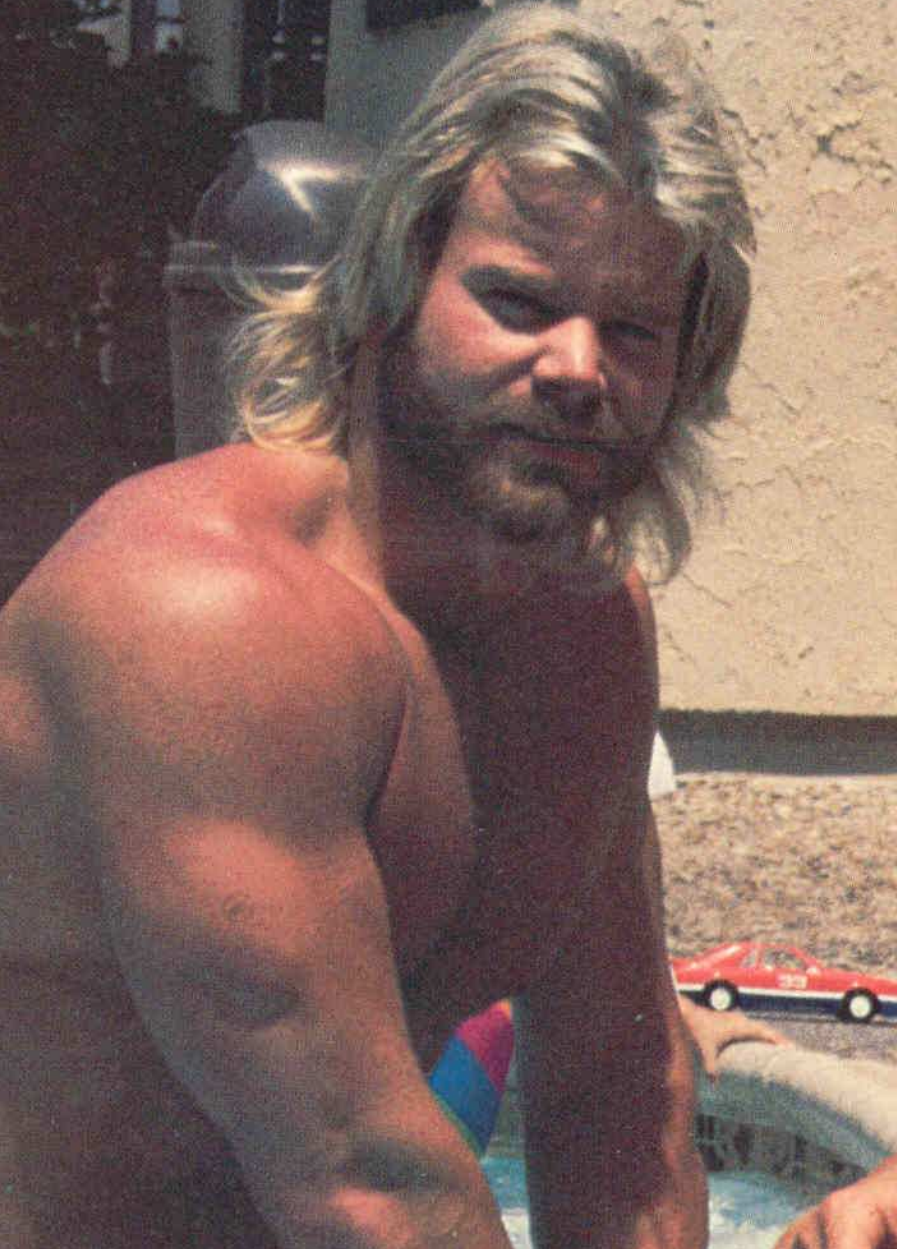
- Lane in 1985

Personal information
- Born: Wallace Stanfield Lane; August 5, 1953 (age 73) Greensboro, North Carolina, U.S.
- Spouse: Maria Burnette (m. 2007)

Professional wrestling career
- Ring name(s): Stan Lane; Stan Flair
- Billed height: 6 ft 1 in (1.85 m)
- Billed weight: 224 lb (102 kg)
- Billed from: Pensacola, Florida
- Trained by: Ric Flair
- Debut: 1978
- Retired: December 6, 2008

Wallace Stanfield Lane (born August 5, 1953) is an American former professional wrestler and color commentator. He is best known for his appearances with the Continental Wrestling Association (CWA), Jim Crockett Promotions and World Championship Wrestling (WCW) in the 1980s. Primarily a tag team wrestler, Lane held championships including the AWA Southern Tag Team Championship, NWA United States Tag Team Championship, NWA World Tag Team Championship, and SMW Tag Team Championship as part of The Fabulous Ones, The Midnight Express, and The Heavenly Bodies.

== Professional wrestling career ==
=== Championship Wrestling from Florida (1978–1980; 1986–1987) ===
Lane was trained by Ric Flair, debuting in 1978. He initially wrestled primarily for Championship Wrestling from Florida.

=== Continental Wrestling Association (1981–1987) ===
In 1982, Stan Lane went to the CWA in Memphis TN and formed a team called The Fabulous Ones with Steve Keirn. The team feuded with The Midnight Express, Jerry Lawler and Bill Dundee, The Sheepherders (Butch Miller and Luke Williams), Randy Savage and Leapin' Lanny Poffo and The Moondogs with whom they had a series of exceptionally bloody matches. They were also pioneers in the "MTV style" of promotion, creating promotional videos and spectacular entrances with their popular theme song "Everybody Wants You" by Billy Squier. The Fabulous Ones was actually started in Memphis by Jerry Jarrett and Jackie Fargo.

=== American Wrestling Association (1984–1986) ===
In 1984, the Fabulous Ones worked in Minnesota for American Wrestling Association. They were a popular tag team.

=== Jim Crockett Promotions / World Championship Wrestling (1987–1990) ===
In early 1987, Dennis Condrey left Jim Crockett Promotions abruptly, leaving former partner Bobby Eaton and manager Jim Cornette as a tag-team with only one member. Familiar to tag-team wrestling in The Fabulous Ones, Stan Lane joined them. Lane and Eaton already knew each other in the past working opposite each other and they worked well together as the new version of the Midnight Express from the beginning. Early on, "Sweet" Stan added a deep radio "DJ voice" for manager Jim Cornette to work the crowd.

In May 1987, the combination of Eaton and Lane proved to be a golden one as they won the NWA US Tag-Team titles (a title they would win three times during their time together). A year later the team was cheered on to victory as the Midnight Express won the NWA World Tag-Team Titles from Four Horsemen members Arn Anderson and Tully Blanchard (See also: Brain Busters) on September 10, 1988. This feat meant that they were the first tag-team to ever hold both the NWA World tag-team and NWA United States tag-team titles, a feat only the Steiner Brothers would go on to duplicate in 1991. The Express' run with the belts was a short one; they were defeated by The Road Warriors in a match that marked Hawk and Animal's first title reign. Frustrated by their inability to win the tag belts in previous years, the Warriors and manager Paul Ellering had decided to return to their roots as violent thugs who would do anything to win. This new attitude soon paid off with a title victory over Lane and Eaton. On October 29, 1988, the Midnights' reign came to a quick and violent end in New Orleans. At the beginning of the match, Ellering brutally attacked Express manager Jim Cornette outside the ring. When Lane jumped in, the Warriors battered and bloodied Eaton, leaving Lane to fight both Hawk and Animal essentially on his own. Eaton was eventually able to tag in, but was quickly overwhelmed by Animal and pinned after a vicious clothesline.

Now the fan favorites the Midnight Express soon had to contend with a blast from the past, The Original Midnight Express as it consisted of Dennis Condrey and Randy Rose, who had teamed up before Condrey and Eaton became a team. During the November 5 episode of WCW Saturday Night, Jim Cornette (kayfabe) received an anonymous phone call, as the caller ridiculed Cornette over Eaton and Lane's loss of the NWA World Tag Team Championship to The Road Warriors on October 29. Cornette recognized the caller and basically asked him to come say it to his face. At that point, Dangerously and the Original Midnight Express hit the ring and proceeded to pummel Cornette and Stan Lane, who was wrestling in a singles match. Bobby Eaton who was at ringside tried to get in the ring to his partner and manager but Paul E Danerously and The Original Midnight Express prevented Bobby from doing so. The Cornette showed up the next week on TBS carrying his blood stained suit jacket and the feud was on.

The teams wrestled at Starrcade '88, but nothing was solved. The Midnights vs. Midnights would be the hottest feud in WCW for months, building up to a six-man tag match involving the managers on pay-per-view in February 1989. The one who got pinned would have to leave the promotion. However, WCW (the former Jim Crockett Promotions) was under new ownership and in transition at the time and many wrestlers were coming and going. At the last minute, Condrey decided to leave WCW. Jack Victory was brought in as his replacement and the match went forward, but at this point no one really cared.

Due to various booking issues, Jim Cornette and the Midnight Express left the promotion for a short while, around the time that Ted Turner brought out Jim Crockett and began promoting the federation as the National Wrestling Alliance / World Championship Wrestling. When the booking issues started to clear up, Cornette and the Midnight Express returned to the federation and a very strong tag-team division. One of those teams was The Dynamic Dudes (Shane Douglas and Johnny Ace), who admitted that the Midnight Express was one of their favorite teams and asked if Cornette would be their manager as well. Cornette agreed but the Midnight Express were not happy about it at all. After arguing, Jim Cornette stopped accompanying the Express to the ring, choosing to only manage the Dudes. At the Clash of Champions IX the two teams met with Jim Cornette in a neutral corner, forced to choose between the teams. The Express started out very aggressively, especially for a team that was supposed to be fan favorites and when the night was over the Midnight Express had once again established themselves as heels with Jim Cornette in their corner; Cornette had never stopped siding with the Express.

After their heel turn, the Midnight Express started feuding with Flyin' Brian and "Z-Man" Tom Zenk over the recently re-activated US Tag-Team titles, winning the gold from the young team in early 1990. The Midnight Express would lose the titles to The Steiner Brothers three months later.

After appearing at Halloween Havoc 1990, the Midnight Express split up when Cornette and Lane left the federation, due to conflicts with Jim Herd and booker Ole Anderson. For the first time in seven years there was no Midnight Express; it was the end of an era in tag-team wrestling.

=== United States Wrestling Association (1990–1991) ===
In December 1990, to fans' excitement, he reformed the Fabulous Ones with Keirn briefly in the United States Wrestling Association (USWA), with Cornette as their manager. On January 7, 1991, they won the USWA Tag Team titles, defeating Tony Anthony and Doug Gilbert. Three weeks later, on January 28, after a controversial match with Jeff Jarrett and Jerry Lawler, the titles were held up; a week later, on February 4, the rematch for the held-up titles was held and they lost the match and the titles to Lawler and Jarrett.

=== Independent circuit (1991–1992) ===
During 1991–1992, Lane competed in multiple independent wrestling organizations, including the Tri State Wrestling Alliance, the Global Wrestling Federation (GWF), the WWA, South Atlantic Pro Wrestling (SAPW), the AWF, the VWA, and the IWA. During his stay in the GWF he wrestled and lost to The Patriot in matches for the TV and North American heavyweight titles. During his stay in the AWF, Stan Lane competed against Paul Orndorff in the heavyweight title tournament, but lost in the final match, but Lane later won the title. Lane also held the tag team title with Jeff Collette in the VWA, and was managed by The Big Cheese during his time in the IWA.

=== Smoky Mountain Wrestling/World Championship Wrestling (1992–1993) ===
In 1992, Lane and Cornette went to Smoky Mountain Wrestling (SMW), to form a new team called "The Heavenly Bodies" with Tom Prichard. They also worked for World Championship Wrestling in early 1993. They feuded with The Rock 'n' Roll Express and won the tag team titles five times, until he retired from the ring after losing a loser leaves town match on May 15, 1993. Lane was replaced in the team by Jimmy Del Ray. He later went to work in Japan.

=== World Wrestling Federation (1993–1995) ===
Lane retired in 1993 and went to the World Wrestling Federation (WWF), as a member of the WWF's broadcast team. He began as a color commentator alongside Vince McMahon on WWF Superstars. He then went on to become the host of WWF Wrestling Challenge in 1994, where he worked with Ted DiBiase and Gorilla Monsoon. Lane also did voiceover work of matches that were taped exclusively for Coliseum Video. He worked with DiBiase and Monsoon for those also. He also worked as a commentator in Ted DiBiase's promotion, WXO. Lane left the WWF in late 1995 and retired.

=== Return to the independent circuit (1999–2008) ===
Lane returned to wrestling in 1999, reforming the Fabulous Ones for a few cards in Bert Prentice's NWA Wildside promotion. In 2004, Lane wrestled on several shows with Condrey and Eaton on the independent circuit in the Mid-Atlantic area. The final match of his 30-year career was held on December 6, 2008 in Charlotte, North Carolina, where he teamed with Eaton in a loss to his old rivals, the Rock 'n' Roll Express.

== Personal life ==
Lane married Maria Burnette on June 30, 2007 on Siesta Key Beach in Sarasota, Florida.

The mother of Congresswoman Lauren Boebert filed multiple paternity suits between 1987 and 1990, alleging that Lane is Boebert's father. A paternity test Lane took in 1990 ruled him out as the father, and the suit was dismissed. In 2012, Boebert's mother sent the North Carolina State Bureau of Investigation a letter asking for further investigation, but there is no record that the bureau took any action. Social media and blog posts between 2008 and 2013 continued to allege that Lane is Boebert's father. The matter was settled in May 2023, when Lane took a second paternity test, which again ruled him out as the father.

== Championships and accomplishments ==
- American Wrestling Federation
  - AWF Heavyweight Championship (1 time)
- Championship Wrestling from Florida
  - NWA Florida Tag Team Championship (3 times) - with Bryan St. John
  - NWA United States Tag Team Championship (Florida version) (2 times) - with Steve Keirn
- Continental Wrestling Association
  - AWA Southern Tag Team Championship (16 times) - with Steve Keirn (14 times), Koko Ware (1 time), and Ron Bass (1 time)
- Georgia Championship Wrestling
  - NWA Georgia Junior Heavyweight Championship (1 time)
- Jim Crockett Promotions / World Championship Wrestling
  - NWA United States Tag Team Championship (3 times) - with Bobby Eaton
  - NWA World Tag Team Championship (Mid-Atlantic version) (1 time) - with Bobby Eaton
- Memphis Wrestling Hall of Fame
  - Class of 2017
- Pro Wrestling Illustrated
  - PWI Tag Team of the Year award in 1987 - with Bobby Eaton
- Smoky Mountain Wrestling
  - SMW Tag Team Championship (5 times) - with Tom Prichard
- Southwest Championship Wrestling
  - SCW World Tag Team Championship (1 time) - with Steve Keirn
- United States Wrestling Association
  - USWA World Tag Team Championship (1 time) - with Steve Keirn
- Virginia Wrestling Association
  - VWA Tag Team Championship (1 time) - with Jeff Collette
- Wrestling Observer Newsletter
  - Wrestling Observer Newsletter Hall of Fame (Class of 2009) with Bobby Eaton as The Midnight Express
  - Wrestling Observer Newsletter award for Tag Team Of The Year (1987 and 1988) with Bobby Eaton as The Midnight Express

== See also ==
- The Fabulous Ones
- The Heavenly Bodies
- The Midnight Express
