= Tom Prichard =

American professional wrestler and trainer (born 1959)

- Prichard in 2020

Personal information
- Born: Thomas Prichard; August 18, 1959 (age 67) El Paso, Texas, U.S.
- Spouse: Sandi Prichard
- Family: Bruce Prichard (brother)

Professional wrestling career
- Ring name(s): Dr. Tom Prichard; Dr. X Tom Prichard; Zip
- Billed height: 5 ft 10 in (1.78 m)
- Billed weight: 230 lb (100 kg)
- Billed from: Houston, Texas
- Trained by: The Iron Sheik
- Debut: October 20, 1979
- Retired: September 26, 2020

Thomas Prichard (born August 18, 1959) is an American retired professional wrestler and author better known by the ring name Dr. Tom Prichard. He is the older brother of Bruce Prichard.

== Professional wrestling career ==
=== Early career (1979–1986) ===
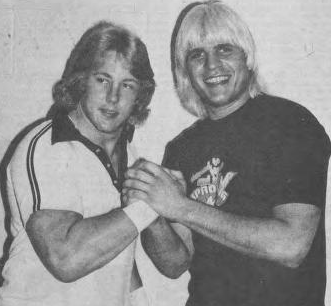
Prichard (left) and Tommy Rich (right), c. 1983

Tom Prichard began his career in Los Angeles, around 1979, working for Gene and Mike LeBell's Los Angeles Olympic Auditorium wrestling promotion, where he held several championships in that organization, including the Americas tag team title with Chris Adams. After LeBell closed the L.A. promotion down in 1982, Prichard competed in various NWA territories for the next four years (including a stint as color commentator in Georgia Championship Wrestling (replacing the departed Roddy Piper) in 1982–83) before settling in the southeast, where he had the greatest success of his career. This also included stints for Mid-South Wrestling, Continental Wrestling Association, and Pacific Northwest Wrestling.

=== Continental Championship Wrestling / Continental Wrestling Federation (1986–1989) ===
Prichard, c. 1988

Prichard joined Continental Championship Wrestling in 1986, and by 1988, he feuded with "The Dirty White Boy" Tony Anthony. Their feud included a very controversial angle, which aired on April 23, 1988, where Anthony's valet came out with a black eye and begged Prichard to help her, only for Anthony to attack him from behind, cuff his hands behind his back and hang him. On October 3, 1988, in Birmingham, Alabama, he defeated Anthony in the finals of a tournament to win the vacant CWF Heavyweight Championship. Prichard lost the title to Wendell Cooley on April 7, 1989, in Knoxville, Tennessee, but regained the belt on June 23 of that year. He lost the title to Dennis Condrey a month later on July 22 in Dothan, Alabama, before once again regaining it after defeating Condrey on December 6 of that same year. Prichard held the title until the CWF closed later that month.

=== World Wrestling Federation (1987) ===
Prichard made an appearance for the World Wrestling Federation on August 28, 1987, at the Paul Boesch Retirement Show in Houston, Texas when he defeated Mark Lewin.

=== New Japan Pro Wrestling (1989) ===
From October to November 1989, Prichard worked for New Japan Pro Wrestling where he teamed with Matt Borne and Tony St. Clair.

=== World Championship Wrestling (1990) ===
Prichard made his only appearance for World Championship Wrestling on September 15, 1990, against Hector Guerrero which ended in a draw at a house show.

=== International Promotions (1990–1991) ===
Prichard wrestled in Germany's Catch Wrestling Association in 1990. In 1991, he returned to Japan but this time for W*ING where he teamed with Eddie Gilbert.

=== United States Wrestling Association (1990–1992) ===
In 1990, Prichard then moved on to the United States Wrestling Association, first working out of the Texas branch, where he formed a heel stable that included Eric Embry and Steve Austin, managed by Tojo Yamamoto. They feuded with the other top babyfaces, including Jeff Jarrett, Bill Dundee, Robert Fuller, and others. While based out of Texas, Prichard won both the USWA Southern Heavyweight championship and the USWA Texas Heavyweight championship before the USWA (closed the Texas) end of their territory in November 1990. Afterwards, Prichard competed in the Memphis end of the USWA before the opening of Smoky Mountain Wrestling in 1992.

=== Smoky Mountain Wrestling, World Championship Wrestling and World Wrestling Federation (1992–1995) ===
Stan Lane and Prichard formed a team as "The Heavenly Bodies" and joined Smoky Mountain Wrestling upon its formation in 1992, and on April 23, 1992, in Harrogate, Tennessee, they defeated The Fantastics to become the first SMW Tag Team Champions. They continued to feud with The Fantastics throughout mid-1992, and were finally defeated for the titles on August 8, 1992, in a barbed wire cage match in Johnson City, Tennessee. The Heavenly Bodies regained the titles two days later, holding them for three months before losing to the Rock 'n' Roll Express on November 13, 1992, in a hospital elimination match in Harlan, Kentucky. They traded the titles with the Rock 'n' Roll Express three times in a variety of hardcore matches over the following year before Lane left the promotion and retired from the ring.

The Heavenly Bodies made a few appearances for World Championship Wrestling in January and February 1993, where they continued their feud with the Rock 'n' Roll Express. This included an appearance at SuperBrawl III where the Rock 'n' Roll Express won.

Prichard reformed the Heavenly Bodies with Jimmy Del Ray, and the two competed in both SMW and the World Wrestling Federation, wrestling the WWF World tag team champions the Steiner Brothers at SummerSlam 1993. On November 24, 1993, in Boston on the World Wrestling Federation's pay-per-view Survivor Series 1993, Prichard and Del Ray defeated the Rock 'n' Roll Express. The Rock 'n' Roll Express regained the titles on February 18, 1994, in Port Huron, Michigan, but lost the titles to the Heavenly Bodies on the following day in Taylor, Michigan. At WrestleMania X the Heavenly Bodies defeated the Bushwhackers in a dark match.

The Rock 'n' Roll Express defeated the Heavenly Bodies on April 1, 1994, in Pikeville, Kentucky in a "Loser Leaves SMW match", where they then competed in the World Wrestling Federation for about a year, before being released in July 1995. Prichard fought in a couple of single matches against Bret Hart and Shawn Michaels. They returned to SMW and regained the SMW Tag Team Championship, marking Prichard's eighth title reign, on August 4, 1995, in Knoxville, Tennessee, defeating Tracy Smothers and Dirty White Boy at the Super Bowl of Wrestling. During the feud, The Thugs injured Prichard's leg, and he began wearing a loaded boot, which he used as a weapon to gain victories for him and Del Ray. They held the titles until the promotion folded on November 26, 1995. Also that summer they worked for United States Wrestling Association.

=== United States Wrestling Association and Extreme Championship Wrestling (1995) ===
They won the USWA Tag Team titles from PG-13 on August 7, 1995. After SMW folded, the Heavenly Bodies briefly wrestled for Extreme Championship Wrestling in December, until Prichard returned to the WWF.

=== Return to the WWF (1995–2004) ===
Prichard competed under his own name with his Heavenly Bodies attire at the Survivor Series 1995, wrestling on future tag team partner Skip's team "The Bodydonnas." Prichard was the first man eliminated as the Bodydonnas defeated Barry Horowitz's "Underdogs" team. A month later, Prichard was officially introduced as Zip, Skip's on-screen cousin and tag team partner, interfering in a match allowing Skip to defeat Rad Radford, who had been trying to become a Bodydonna himself. Before this appearance he cut off his long curly brown hair into a dyed blond crew cut, to more resemble his storyline cousin.

On the WrestleMania XII pre-show, on March 31, 1996, the team defeated The Godwinns in the finals of an eight team tournament to win the vacant WWF Tag Team Championship. They held the titles until May 19, 1996, when they were defeated by the Godwinns in Madison Square Garden in New York City. After Skip left the WWF in September 1996, Prichard became a masked jobber named Dr.X. Dr. X fought mainly on house shows but made a few TV appearances on Superstars. Dr. X lost to Brakkus at In Your House 12: It's Time. By 1997, he became a trainer for the company, responsible for training such future stars as The Rock, Kurt Angle, and Mark Henry, among others. Sometimes he wrestled as Dr. X on house shows until 1998. In addition, Prichard made a few appearances as a singles wrestler for ECW in the summer of 1997.

On November 16, 1998, Prichard became the masked Blue Blazer teaming with Jeff Jarrett losing to Steve Blackman and Goldust on Raw Is War. The next week he lost to Blackman and December 21 both on Raw Is War. The Blue Blazer gimmick was related to Owen Hart storylines and Hart's feud with Blackman. On September 27, 1999, Prichard teamed up with Jeff Jarrett to face against Chyna and Debra on Raw Is War. Prichard hit Chyna with a guitar and Jarrett was knocked out cold as Chyna went for the victory. He also occasionally commentated for shows such as WWF Metal and co-hosted Byte This!, the WWF's internet talk show. Prichard was released from WWE in 2004.

=== Independent circuit (2004–2007) ===
He went on to wrestle in the United Wrestling Association and in various other independent promotions in the Southeastern United States. He also holds training seminars in conjunction with certain promotions. During this time Prichard also befriended online professional wrestling journalist James Guttman of World Wrestling Insanity and provided a weekly commentary on the world of pro wrestling entitled Tuesdays with Tom. On August 10, 2006, eight days prior to his 47th birthday, he became the oldest man to win the United Wrestling Association Heavyweight Championship, defeating Dillinger for the title.

=== Second return to WWE (2007–2012) ===
In January 2007, he was rehired by WWE and replaced Bill DeMott as the head trainer for Deep South Wrestling (DSW). When DSW closed, he was moved to WWE's new developmental territory Florida Championship Wrestling. On May 30, 2012, Prichard was released from the WWE, being replaced by Bill DeMott as the head trainer.

=== Later career (2012–2020) ===
After being released by WWE, Prichard lost The Big O on October 12, 2012, for Pro Wrestling Syndicate in Rahway, New Jersey. For the later part of his career, he feuded with his former rivals the Rock 'n' Roll Express. This included a match on April 19, 2014, when he lost to Robert Gibson of the Rock 'n' Roll Express at LXW ThunderManier in Sylacauga, Alabama. In October 2014, Prichard went to Germany to work for Westside Xtreme Wrestling (WXW).

In 2017, Prichard travelled to England to wrestle at the Runcorn Wrestling Academy (RWA), where he teamed up with RWA owner Andreas Rossi (his former OVW trainee), Chris Von Sharpe, and Connor "The Bullet" Stafford in an eight-man tag team match against "Fantastic" Matt Fox, Demoni, Johnathan Alexander, and Mr. Williams. After the match, Prichard and Rossi announced that this was their final match.

Prichard would return to wrestling a year later. His final match was on September 26, 2020, in a 6-man tag team with LT Falk Jr. and Tony Atlas, defeating Dillon McQueen and The Brothers Of Seduction (Cam The Prince and Jake Tucker) at Jerry Lawler's 50th Anniversary Celebration in Jackson, Tennessee.

== Wrestlers trained ==
- The Rock
- Randy Orton
- The Hardy Boyz
- Edge & Christian
- Kurt Angle
- Brock Lesnar
- The Usos
- Bray Wyatt
- Kofi Kingston
- The Miz
- Sheamus
- Mark Henry
- Dolph Ziggler
- The Bella Twins
- Matt Cardona
- Shane McMahon
- Saraya
- Maryse
- Natalya
- Test
- Stephanie McMahon
- Val Venis
- Rusev
- Albert
- Heath Slater
- Damien Sandow
- Channing “Stacks” Lorenzo
- Titus O’Neil
- Kenzie Paige
- Alicia Fox
- Trent Beretta
- Ivy Nile
- Jason Jordan
- AJ Cazana
- Giant Silva
- Kylie Paige
- Adam Rose
- Dillon McQueen
- Alex Riley
- Steve Bradley
- Brakkus

== Championships and accomplishments ==
- All-Star Wrestling
  - ASW Southern Heavyweight Championship (1 time)
- American Wrestling Council
  - AWC Heavyweight Championship (1 time)
- Cauliflower Alley Club
  - Ron Hutchison Trainers Award (2025)
- Five Star Wrestling
  - FSW Tag Team Championship (1 time) – with Smack Johnson
- George Tragos/Lou Thesz Professional Wrestling Hall of Fame
  - Verne Gagne Trainers Award (2024)
- Global Championship Wrestling
  - GCW Texas Heavyweight Championship (1 time)
- Memphis Wrestling Hall of Fame
  - Class of 2024
- NWA Hollywood Wrestling
  - NWA Americas Tag Team Championship (5 times) – with Apollo Jalisco (2), Alberto Madril (2), and Chris Adams (1)
- NWA Rocky Top
  - NWA Rocky Top Heavyweight Championship (1 time)
- NWA Wrestle Birmingham
  - NWA Alabama Heavyweight Championship (1 time)
- Pacific Northwest Wrestling
  - NWA Pacific Northwest Tag Team Championship (3 times) – with Brett Sawyer
- Pennsylvania Championship Wrestling
  - PCW Tag Team Championship (1 time) – with Jimmy Del Ray
- Pro Wrestling Illustrated
  - PWI ranked him # 318 of the 500 best singles wrestlers of the PWI Years in 2003
  - PWI ranked him # 73 of the 100 best tag teams of the PWI Years, with Jimmy Del Ray and Stan Lane in 2003.
- Ring Around The Northwest Newsletter
  - Tag Team of the Year (1984) with Brett Sawyer
- Southeastern Championship Wrestling / Continental Championship Wrestling / Continental Wrestling Federation
  - CWF Heavyweight Championship (3 times)
  - NWA Alabama Heavyweight Championship (2 times)
  - NWA Southeast United States Junior Heavyweight Championship (5 times)
- Smoky Mountain Wrestling
  - SMW Tag Team Championship (8 times) – with Stan Lane (5) and Jimmy Del Ray (3)
- United States Wrestling Association
  - USWA Southern Heavyweight Championship (6 times)
  - USWA Texas Heavyweight Championship (2 times)
  - USWA World Tag Team Championship (1 time) – with Jimmy Del Ray
- United Wrestling Association
  - UWA Southern Heavyweight Championship (1 time)
  - UWA Texas Heavyweight Championship (1 time)
- World Wrestling Federation
  - WWF Tag Team Championship (1 time) – with Skip
  - WWF Tag Team Championship Tournament (1996) - with Skip

=== Luchas de Apuestas record ===
Winner (wager)	Loser (wager)	Location	Event	Date	Notes
Tom Prichard (hair)	Jonathan Boyd (championship)	Birmingham, Alabama	Live event	February 15, 1988	
