= Chris Youngblood =

American professional wrestler (1966–2021)

Personal information
- Born: Christopher Romero; February 10, 1966 Amarillo, Texas, U.S.
- Died: July 7, 2021 (aged 55) Portland, Oregon, U.S.
- Family: Ricky Romero (father); Mark Youngblood (brother); Jay Youngblood (brother)

Professional wrestling career
- Ring name(s): Brave Sky; Chris Youngblood; Medicine Man; Pronto
- Billed height: 6 ft 0 in (1.83 m)
- Billed weight: 235 lb (107 kg; 16.8 st)
- Trained by: Ricky Romero
- Debut: 1985
- Retired: 2019

Christopher Romero (February 10, 1966 – July 7, 2021) was an American professional wrestler, better known by his ring name Chris Youngblood. A second generation wrestler, he was the son of Ricky Romero and the brother of Mark and Jay Youngblood.

== Professional wrestling career ==
=== Early career ===
Chris Romero was the son of Ricky Romero. He began his pro-wrestling training at the age of 13 and made his professional debut as Chris Youngblood in 1985. He started teaming with brother Mark in 1986 upon their older brother Jay's death.

Chris and Mark had success in the World Class Championship Wrestling, World Wrestling Council and also as The Tribal Nation in the Global Wrestling Federation and the United States Wrestling Association. In the USWA, Chris turned heel and wrestled for manager Skandor Akbar's "Devastation Inc." as Pronto. During this time Chris had a feud with a young up and coming Stone Cold Steve Austin.

=== World Wrestling Council ===
Chris and Mark had a very successful run in being one of the most popular tag teams in Puerto Rico's World Wrestling Council and added numerous Tag Title reigns under their belts. But on July 17, 1988, The Romeros were in the locker room when a wrestler named José Huertas stabbed and killed Bruiser Brody. Huertas went to trial but did not do any jail time for the crime. The WWC did nothing to help convict Huertas and The Romeros left the WWC right after the incident and went on to sign with Ted Turner's World Championship Wrestling where he and Mark were known as "The Renegade Warriors". The two were frequently used on WCW TV and had numerous feuds with The Steiner Brothers and The Road Warriors.

=== Frontier Martial-Arts Wrestling ===
In the late 1990s Chris began using the name "The Visionary" Chris Romero. Chris completed many Japanese tours as a singles competitor where he gained victories over ECW's own, Rob Van Dam. Chris later formed a Tag Team in Japan's Frontier Martial-Arts Wrestling with "Super" Leatherface. The team got notable wins over Tag Teams like Jado and Gedo, and Masato Tanaka and Tetsuhiro Kuroda. The two were constant top runners for the FMW Brass Knuckles Tag Team Titles until Chris went into semi-retirement in late 1999 due to a hip injury.

=== Semi-retirement ===
Chris worked in numerous independent promotions across the State of Texas including the Texas-based NWA Southwest where Chris was at one point in top contention for the NWA Texas Heavyweight Championship. During that time, he also teamed up with his nephew "Radical" Ricky Romero III against numerous teams including The Lone Star Connection. In 2005, Chris began booking shows and wrestling part-time for Panhandle Wrestling Federation, later renamed West Texas Wrestling Legends, an independent promotion exclusive to Amarillo, Texas. In 2006, World Wrestling Entertainment showed interest in hiring Chris as a Producer for training and scouting talent.

A few months later in April 2007, Chris began running Romero Academy of Wrestling out of the Amarillo-based Wrestleplex. The Wrestleplex was also home to the newly renamed Professional Wrestling Federation (formerly known as West Texas Wrestling Legends) where Chris was also the booker and manager to a stable known as "Bloodline". Bloodline was the first stable of its kind consisting only of second and third generation superstars "Radical" Ricky Romero III, Cody Jones and Mike DiBiase Jr. Then four months after PWF's resurrection, Chris Romero resigned from the promotion on August 14, 2007. With him he took the top tier title of the PWF, the West Texas Wrestling Legends Heritage Championship, which he owned. A couple of weeks after leaving PWF, Chris made a rare wrestling appearance on August 29, 2007, in Socorro, New Mexico, at New Mexico Tech for the locally based L.A.W where he defeated up and comer Nick A. Demus in a match that saw Chris seriously injure his knee.

Chris Romero continued to run Romero Academy of Wrestling, now ROW 101 until his death, and started his own independent wrestling promotion named Renegade Outlaw Wrestling, which has been running shows every even numbered Friday night in the Historic NAT Ballroom in Amarillo, Texas since October 2007.

He continued to work in the independent circuit. On June 28, 2011, he lost to the Cuban Assassin for FUW in Largo, Florida. He reunited with his brother, Mark in 2019 teaming together in Puerto Rico.

== Death ==
Romero died on July 7, 2021, at the age of 55. He was buried beside his father in Llano Cemetery.

== Championships and accomplishments ==
- Cauliflower Alley Club
  - Family Wrestling Award (2015) – with Ricky Romero, Jay Youngblood and Mark Youngblood
- National Wrestling Alliance
  - NWA Australasian Tag Team Championship (1 time) - with Mark Youngblood
- World Wide Wrestling Alliance
  - WWWA Heavyweight Championship (1 time)
- World Wrestling Council
  - WWC Caribbean Tag Team Championship (2 times) - with Mark Youngblood
  - WWC World Tag Team Championship (7 times) - with Mark Youngblood
- Professional Wrestling Federation
  - PWF Brass Knuckles Championship (1 time)
- Pro Wrestling Illustrated
  - PWI ranked him #331 of the top 500 singles wrestlers in the PWI 500 in 1991
  - PWI ranked him #100 of the 100 best tag teams during the PWI Years with Mark Youngblood in 2003
- Southern Championship Wrestling
  - SCW Tag Team Championship (1 time) - with Mark Youngblood
