= Mark Youngblood =

American professional wrestler (born 1963)

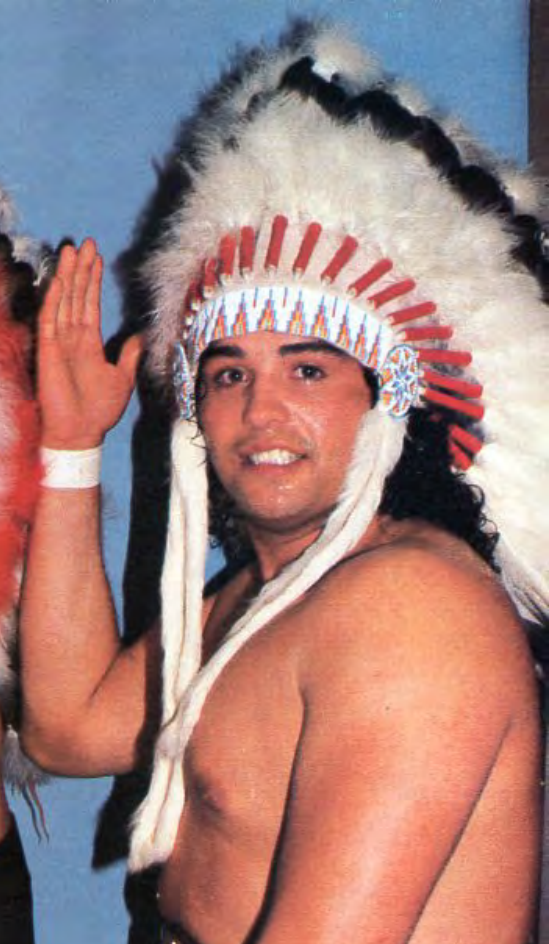
- Youngblood, c. 1984

Personal information
- Born: Mark Romero; July 21, 1963 (age 63) Amarillo, Texas, U.S.
- Family: Ricky Romero (father); Chris Youngblood (brother); Jay Youngblood (brother)

Professional wrestling career
- Ring name(s): Mark Romero; Mark Youngblood; Nikona
- Billed height: 5 ft 9 in (175 cm)
- Billed weight: 249 lb (113 kg)
- Billed from: Amarillo, Texas
- Trained by: Ricky Romero
- Debut: 1980
- Retired: 2019

Mark Romero (born July 21, 1963) is an American former second generation professional wrestler better known by his ring name Mark Youngblood.

== Professional wrestling career ==
Mark Romero is the son of Ricky Romero. He started wrestling as Mark Youngblood in 1980 and worked for the National Wrestling Alliance's Jim Crockett Promotions as a tag team with Wahoo McDaniel. He wrestled in Florida Championship Wrestling in 1985 with his brother Jay and formed a tag team with his younger brother Chris Romero in 1986 following Jay's death.

The Romeros achieved some success in the World Wrestling Council and later in the Global Wrestling Federation and the United States Wrestling Association as "The Tribal Nation". They also had a brief stint in World Championship Wrestling as "The Renegade Warriors". Mark retired from wrestling in 1999.

In early 2006, he wrestled at the Amarillo, Texas, based indy-wrestling company West Texas Wrestling Legends ran by his brother Chris. He made several appearances for the company before going back into retirement in July 2006. On January 13, 2007, he resurfaced in WTWL and defeated the WTWL Champion Thunder to win the championship. After the match, WTWL wrestlers "Hobo" Hank, Mike DiBiase, Dice Murdock, nephew "Radical" Ricky Romero III and Mark's brother Chris Romero came down to celebrate the win with the new champion. Romero explained that his return was for one night only and he later vacated the WTWL Championship.

== Championships and accomplishments ==
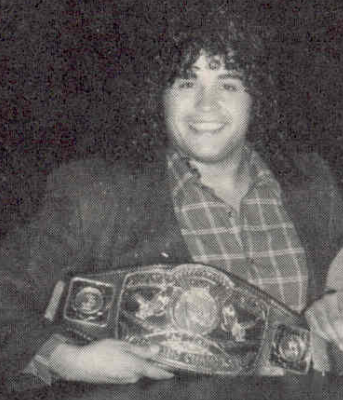
Youngblood as the NWA United States Tag Team Champion, c. 1985

- Cauliflower Alley Club
  - Family Wrestling Award (2015) – with Chris Youngblood, Jay Youngblood and Ricky Romero
- Central States Wrestling
  - NWA Central States Tag Team Championship (2 times) – with Mike George
  - NWA Central States Television Championship (2 times)
- Championship Wrestling from Florida
  - NWA United States Tag Team Championship (Florida version) (2 times) – with Jay Youngblood
- Global Wrestling Federation
  - GWF Tag Team Championship (1 time) – with Chris Youngblood
- Mid-Atlantic Championship Wrestling
  - NWA Television Championship (1 time)
  - NWA World Tag Team Championship (Mid-Atlantic version) (2 times) – with Wahoo McDaniel
- Pro Wrestling Illustrated
  - PWI ranked him #321 of the top 500 singles wrestlers in the PWI 500 in 1991
  - PWI ranked him # 100 of the 100 best tag teams of the PWI Years with Chris Youngblood in 2003.
- Southern Championship Wrestling
  - SCW Tag Team Championship (1 time) - with Chris Youngblood
- West Texas Wrestling Legends
  - WTWL Championship (1 time)
- World Class Championship Wrestling
  - WCCW Television Championship (1 time)
- World Wrestling Council
  - WWC Caribbean Tag Team Championship (2 times) – with Chris Youngblood
  - WWC World Tag Team Championship (7 times) – with Chris Youngblood
