= World Wide Wrestling Alliance =

American wrestling promotion

- Acronym: WWWA
- Founded: 2004
- Style: American Wrestling
- Headquarters: Columbus, Ohio (2005-current)
- Founder: Richard Arpin
- Owner(s): Richard Arpin (2004); Dave Nelson (2004-2005)
- Parent: National Wrestling Alliance
- Formerly: NWA Ohio
- Website: WWWAwrestling.net; WorldWideWrestlingAlliance.com

The World Wide Wrestling Alliance (WWWA), previously known as NWA Ohio, was an American professional wrestling promotion. However, NWA Ohio Owner & Promoter Dave Nelson's claim of ownership of the WWWA name is disputed.

== History ==
Founded by promoter Richard Arpin, the promotion joined the National Wrestling Alliance as NWA Ohio before being bought by promoter Dave Nelson in 2004. In mid-2005, the organization was renamed the World Wide Wrestling Alliance and held its first event in Circleville, Ohio featuring "Hacksaw" Jim Duggan winning the WWWA United States Heavyweight Championship defeating Scott Powers on August 21, 2005. Soon after, the promotion announced its wrestlers would receive contracts to wrestle exclusively for the WWWA. A tour of Iraq for the US Army was advertised as well as a later PPV was also scheduled to air on September 20, 2005.

However, less than a year later, the organization had attracted a great deal of controversy. In 2005, after a failed attempt to purchase Total Nonstop Action Wrestling, Nelson claimed the promotion would go national with a weekly program on ESPN2. However, the show did not debut as promised, and ESPN claimed to have never heard of or spoken to Nelson or the company. Former WWE and WCW star Hacksaw Jim Duggan has been listed as co-owner of the promotion, but has disclaimed any affiliation on his official website, saying that, despite making a few appearances with the company, he has never signed a contract with them, and that he "has nothing to do with the WWWA or NWA Ohio." Bill Apter, best known as editor of such wrestling publications as Pro Wrestling Illustrated, was claimed to be the Commissioner of World Wide Wrestling Alliance.

Finally, another independent wrestling company using the same name of the World Wide Wrestling Alliance has alleged that Dave Nelson's company is guilty of theft and trademark violation.
