= The Orient Express (professional wrestling) =

Professional wrestling tag team

Tag team
- Members: Akio Sato; Pat Tanaka; Kato; Mr. Fuji (manager)
- Name: The Orient Express
- Billed heights: Sato; 5 ft 9 in (1.75 m); Tanaka: 5 ft 10 in (1.78 m); Diamond: 6 ft 1 in (1.85 m)
- Combined billed weight: Sato and Tanaka: 467 lb (212 kg); Sato: 233 lb (106 kg); Tanaka: 234 lb (106 kg); Tanaka and Kato: 450 lb (200 kg); Tanaka: 220 lb (100 kg); Diamond: 230 lb (100 kg)
- Billed from: Tokyo, Japan
- Debut: 1990
- Disbanded: 1994
- Years active: 1990–1994; 2006–2008

The Orient Express was a professional wrestling tag team in the World Wrestling Federation in the early 1990s composed of Pat Tanaka and Akio Sato, who was later replaced by Kato.

== History ==
=== American Wrestling Association (1986-1990) ===
After Badd Company lost the AWA World Tag Team Championship, they split up and feuded with each other. Tanaka took on Sato as his partner and adopted a more martial arts based ring style. The two feuded with Diamond before together moving to the WWF in 1990.

=== World Wrestling Federation (1990-1992) ===
In early 1990, manager Mr. Fuji split up the team known as The Powers of Pain (The Warlord and The Barbarian) as he sold their individual contracts to Slick who got the former and Bobby Heenan who received the latter, respectively. Fuji then brought in The Orient Express (Sato & Tanaka) as his latest threat to the WWF tag team division. While the Orient Express was supposed to represent Japan, Pat Tanaka was born in Hawaii.

The Orient Express kicked off a prolonged feud with The Rockers (Shawn Michaels and Marty Jannetty) that started at WrestleMania VI, where Sato and Tanaka were victorious via countout after Sato threw salt in Jannetty's eyes while they were outside of the ring, and continued off and on for well over a year. The Orient Express got involved in the feud between Legion of Doom (Animal and Hawk) and Demolition (Ax, Smash and later Crush) as Fuji reconciled with former protegés Demolition and resumed managing them. The angle was also intended to phase out founder Demolition member Ax and refresh Demolition's edge as villains after a series of house show losses to the Legion of Doom and Ultimate Warrior. Following an incident in which all three Demolition members ran in on an Express vs LOD match and the manager and both his teams beat down Hawk and Animal six-on-two, WWF President Jack Tunney ordered that one Demolition member leave the WWF (this would be Ax) and the remaining two be placed under probation. Tunney additionally ordered the Orient Express, along with Fuji as an active wrestler, to take on the Legion of Doom in five man handicap tag matches in Demolition's place. The feud between the Legion of Doom and the Orient Express and Fuji was extremely one-sided despite the three on two advantage, due to the Legion of Doom's massive size advantage.

After WrestleMania VI, Tanaka and Sato made only two more pay-per-view appearances while in the WWF. First at SummerSlam 1990 where the team was defeated by "Hacksaw" Jim Duggan and Nikolai Volkoff. They were then a part of the Sgt. Slaughter led team "The Mercenaries" (that also included Boris Zhukov. Sato was pinned by Bushwhacker Butch 1:46 into the match and Tanaka was pinned by Tito Santana only moments later, 2:13 into the match.

When Akio Sato decided to leave the US wrestling scene in the latter days of 1990, the WWF decided to reunite Badd Company, only this time with Paul Diamond wearing a mask to conceal his ethnicity and using the name Kato. During this time the team had a very well received match with their old enemies the Rockers at the 1991 Royal Rumble and another well received match against The New Foundation (Jim "The Anvil" Neidhart and "The Rocket" Owen Hart) at the 1992 Royal Rumble – which were the only two PPV appearances for the New Orient Express.

Sato briefly rejoined the team in 1991 to team with Tanaka and Kato for a series of 6-man tag-team matches on WWF house shows, but Sato left the WWF after only a handful of matches together. Tanaka would leave the WWF in February 1992. Diamond went on to wrestle as a singles competitor in the WWF, first as Kato, then later as Max Moon, replacing the departed Konnan, neither gimmick meeting with very much success.

=== Post-WWF and split (1992-1994, 2006-2008) ===
After Kato also left the WWF, the two reunited as Badd Company, working for Eastern Championship Wrestling from late 1993 to early 1994, wrestling against the likes of The Bad Breed (Ian and Axl Rotten) and The Public Enemy, but never won the tag team titles.

Pat Tanaka resurfaced in WCW during 1994 as a singles wrestler billed as "Tanaka-San". Paul Diamond showed up with the Kato mask on using the name "Haito" shortly afterwards. The two men even wrestled a couple of matches together, but they never achieved any notoriety in WCW and finally split up for good by the end of 1994. Pat Tanaka showed up in singles matches during 1996 in WCW. The two reunited in 2006 as the Orient Express on the independent circuit until 2008.

== Championships and accomplishments ==
- American Wrestling Association
  - AWA Southern Tag Team Championship (1 time)
  - AWA World Tag Team Championship (1 time)
- Continental Wrestling Association
  - CWA/AWA International Tag Team Championship (4 times)

== See also ==
- American Force
- Badd Company
