= Badd Company =

Professional disbanded wrestling tag team

Tag team
- Members: Pat Tanaka / Tanaka / Tanaka-san; Paul Diamond / Haito / Kato
- Name(s): Badd Company; Orient Express
- Billed heights: Diamond: 6 ft 1 in (1.85 m); Tanaka: 5 ft 10 in (1.78 m)
- Combined billed weight: 465 lb (211 kg; 33.2 st)
- Debut: 1986
- Disbanded: 1994
- Years active: 1986–1994; 2006–2008

Badd Company was a professional wrestling tag team in the Championship Wrestling Association, American Wrestling Association, Eastern Championship Wrestling, and World Championship Wrestling between 1986 and 1994 comprising Pat Tanaka and Paul Diamond. They used the song "Bad Company", by the band of the same name as their theme song. Tanaka and Diamond also wrestled for the World Wrestling Federation in the early 1990s as the Orient Express.

== History ==
=== Championship Wrestling Association (1986–1988) ===
Both Pat Tanaka and Paul Diamond had competed in the Championship Wrestling Association during 1986, Tanaka had teamed with Jeff Jarrett to win the AWA Southern Tag Team Championship while Paul Diamond had held the CWA/AWA International Tag Team Championship also with Jeff Jarrett.

In late 1986, the two tag team specialists Tanaka and Diamond were teamed up to form "Badd Company", where they held the federation's tag-team titles four times, a move that paid off pretty soon as the two won the CWA/AWA International Tag Team Championship, beating Tarzan Goto and Akio Sato on December 15, 1986. The first reign was short lived as The Sheepherders (Luke Williams and Butch Miller) defeated the young duo on January 10, 1987. Badd Company quickly regained the titles only to lose them to Tarzan Goto and Akio Sato on February 5, 1987. The third run with the tag-team titles came on May 9, 1987 when the team beat Mark Starr in a handicap match, but lost them back to Mark Starr and his new tag team partner Billy Joe Travis. Badd Company had one last run with the International tag team titles as they won the vacant titles on May 25, 1987 and held them until July 6, 1987 where they lost the titles to Bill Dundee and Rocky Johnson (who were the last International tag team champions).

While in Memphis, Badd Company also won the CWA's main tag team titles, the AWA Southern Tag Team Championship defeating Jeff Jarrett and Billy Joe Travis for the gold on August 8, 1987. Tanaka and Diamond soon lost them as the Nasty Boys took the gold from them just over a month later.

=== American Wrestling Association (1988–1990) ===
After working as a team for almost a year Badd Company moved on from the CWA to the American Wrestling Association. In the AWA they were given identical ring gear, and were accompanied by flamboyant manager Diamond Dallas Page, who always had a number of valets, known as the Diamond Dolls, with him.

The team's first feud was against The Midnight Rockers, whom they defeated for the AWA World Tag Team Championship on March 19, 1988. They held the titles for a year, and feuded heavily with Chavo and Mando Guerrero before losing their titles on March 25, 1989 to “the Olympians" (Brad Rheingans and Ken Patera). Shortly after losing their titles they split from Page, and had a short feud against each other before wrestling in singles competition until early 1990.

=== World Wrestling Federation (1990–1992) ===
Pat Tanaka, who is Hawaiian of Japanese descent, later signed with the World Wrestling Federation (WWF), where he formed another tag team called The Orient Express with Akio Sato, managed by Mr. Fuji and billed from Japan. Paul Diamond was soon signed with the WWF as well, as a singles competitor.

When Sato decided to leave the American wrestling scene, Diamond donned a mask and wrestled as "Kato" with Tanaka throughout 1991 and early 1992. During this time the team had a very well received match with their old enemies the Rockers at the 1991 Royal Rumble and another match against the New Foundation at the 1992 Royal Rumble, which were the only two PPV appearances for the New Orient Express.

Sato briefly rejoined the team in 1991 to team with Tanaka and “Kato" for a series of 6-man tag-team matches on various WWF house show but Sato left the WWF after only a handful of matches together. Tanaka would leave the WWF in February 1992. Diamond went on to wrestle as a singles competitor in the WWF first as Kato then later on he was chosen to take over the Max Moon costume after Konnan left the WWF, neither gimmick meeting with very much success. Diamond was released by the company in February 1993.

=== Eastern Championship Wrestling (1993–1994) ===
After Paul Diamond also left the WWF the two reunited as “Badd Company" to work for Eastern Championship Wrestling (the forerunner to Extreme Championship Wrestling) in 1993. The team made their debut at NWA Bloodfest: Part 1 on October 1, 1993 where they beat The Bad Breed (Ian Rotten and Axl Rotten). Later in the night Tanaka and Diamond got a shot at the ECW Tag Team Champions Tony Stetson and Johnny Hotbody, Badd Company lost.

The next night at NWA Bloodfest: Part 2 Badd Company came up against one of ECW's new creations Public Enemy (Rocco Rock and Johnny Grunge) in one of their very early matches. Later in the show Badd Company and the Public Enemy would clash again, this time in a three way, steel cage match that also included "Bad Breed", this time Public Enemy were victorious. At ECW's next big show Terror at Tabor on November 12, 1993 Badd Company beat the makeshift team of Don E. Allen and Mr. Hughes. After the match Badd Company called out Public Enemy resulting in an impromptu match between Paul Diamond and Rocco Rock which Diamond won. Public Enemy quickly got a very brutal revenge on Badd Company as they defeated the duo in a "South Philly hood" match the very next day at November to Remember. At Holiday Hell: The Body Count on December 26, 1993 Pat Tanaka defeated Rocco Rock in a "Body Count" match.

As 1993 turned to 1994 Badd Company set their sights on ECW Tag Team Champions Kevin Sullivan and The Tasmaniac, defeating them twice in non-title matches. At The Night the Line Was Crossed on February 5, 1994 Tanaka and his one night only partner The Sheik defeated Sullivan and Tasmaniac, unfortunately the team had been stripped of the titles the night before. When Tanaka was rejoined by Diamond the team lost to the (once again) tag team champions when the gold was finally on the line. On March 26, 1994 at Ultimate Jeopardy, Badd Company lost to the Bruise Brothers. On March 27, 1994 Badd Company wrestled its last match for ECW, a house show victory over Rockin' Rebel and Pittbull #1.

=== World Championship Wrestling (1994) ===
By the time Badd Company wrestled its last match for ECW, Tanaka and Diamond had already signed with World Championship Wrestling. Tanaka then made his on-screen debut as "Tanaka-San". Paul Diamond showed up with the Kato mask on using the name "Haito" only days after their last ECW match. The duo reprised their "Orient Express" gimmick but could not use the name since the WWF owned the trademark to it. The two men wrestled a couple of matches together, including a dark match against Dave Sullivan and Kevin Sullivan at Spring Stampede 1994, but they never achieved any notoriety in WCW. By the end of 1994, the team split.

=== Independent circuit (2006–2008) ===
They reunited as the Orient Express on March 25, 2006 for Blue Water Championship Wrestling in Port Huron, Michigan as they lost to Kevin Baker and Michael Barnes. They wrestled on the independent circuit for the next couple of years. Their last match together was on April 18, 2008 defeating Joshua Masters and Kennedy Kendrick for All Star Wrestling Florida in Port Richey, Florida.

== Championships and accomplishments ==
- American Wrestling Association
  - AWA Southern Tag Team Championship (1 time)
  - AWA World Tag Team Championship (1 time)
- Continental Wrestling Association
  - CWA/AWA International Tag Team Championship (4 times)
- Pro Wrestling Illustrated
  - PWI ranked them # 99 of the 100 best tag teams of the "PWI Years" in 2003.

== See also ==
- American Force (wrestling)
- Diamond Exchange
- The Orient Express
