= The Diamond Exchange =

Professional wrestling stable

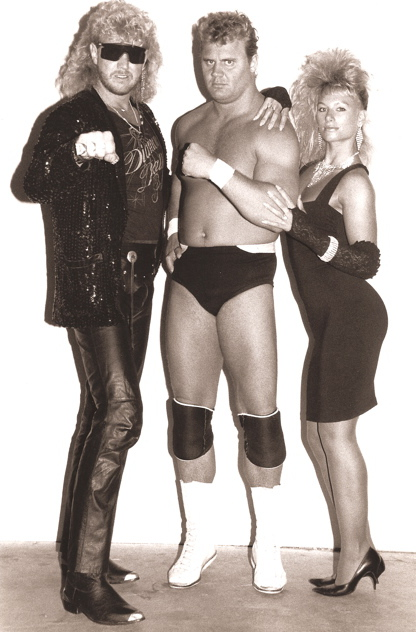
- DDP, Curt Hennig and Diamond Doll Tonya in 1988

Stable
- Members: See below
- Name(s): The Diamond Exchange; The Diamond Mine
- Debut: 1988; 1991
- Disbanded: 1989; 1992

The Diamond Exchange was a professional wrestling stable led by Diamond Dallas Page in the American Wrestling Association from 1988 to 1989. Page led a spiritual successor known as The Diamond Mine in World Championship Wrestling from 1991 to 1992.

== History ==
=== American Wrestling Association (1988–1989) ===
Diamond Dallas Page worked in the nightclub business in Florida before and after he started working as a wrestling manager in the American Wrestling Association (AWA). He started managing Badd Company (Paul Diamond and Pat Tanaka) in 1988, a team he led to the AWA World Tag Team Championship. Badd Company, was often accompanied by a pair of female valets known as the Diamond Dolls who were the girls that worked at his club. The team's first feud was against The Midnight Rockers, whom they defeated for the AWA World Tag Team Championship on March 19, 1988. Badd Company then feuded heavily with Chavo and Mando Guerrero.

When the AWA World Heavyweight Champion Curt Hennig began being associated with the AWA World Women's Champion Madusa Miceli, they joined the Diamond Exchange. Hennig would hold the AWA World Heavyweight Title for about 53 weeks, before losing it to Jerry Lawler on May 9, 1988. On August 27, 1988, DDP introduced Colonel DeBeers as the new member of his stable. During that short time, DeBeers would try to force his opponent to leave on a stretcher.

As many other promising-yet-underexposed AWA stars had before him (including Hulk Hogan, Rick Martel, and Bobby Heenan), Hennig left the AWA for the World Wrestling Federation in the fall of 1988, weeks after his AWA Title reign ended. Badd Company and Madusa faced the team of the Top Guns (Ricky Rice and Derrick Dukes) and Wendi Richter at the only AWA pay-per-view SuperClash III on December 13, 1988. Both Badd Company's Tag-Team Title and Wendi Richter's AWA World Women's Championship were on the line, but since Richter pinned Miceli, Badd Company remained the champions. In 1988, Madusa was also the first woman to be awarded Pro Wrestling Illustrated's Rookie of the Year.

Badd Company held the AWA Tag Team titles for a year before losing the titles on March 25, 1989, to “the Olympians" (Brad Rheingans and Ken Patera). Shortly after their loss, they split from Page and had a short feud against each other before wrestling in singles competition until early 1990. At the time, DDP also worked as a color commentator in Florida Championship Wrestling (FCW) where he worked alongside Gordon Solie, before finally debuting as a professional wrestler. In 1990, Page received a tryout with the WWF as an announcer, but never got the job. When FCW went down, Page was still involved in the club business until Dusty Rhodes returned to World Championship Wrestling. Dusty Rhodes started booking and brought Page in on a small contract in early 1991.

=== World Championship Wrestling (1991–1992) ===
DDP came to World Championship Wrestling (WCW) in 1991 as manager of The Fabulous Freebirds (Jimmy Garvin and Michael P.S. Hayes). Page managed the Freebirds to a shot at the NWA World Tag Team Championship where they defeated Doom (Butch Reed and Ron Simmons) on February 24. During this match, DDP introduced the Diamond Dolls in WCW. Page also worked as a color commentator for WCW with Eric Bischoff.

When Scott Hall, the former tag team partner and former co-holder of the AWA World Tag Team Championship with Curt Hennig, made his return to WCW in 1991, DDP added him to his stable. Hall was named the Diamond Studd, whose gimmick was similar to Ravishing Rick Rude's with the added element of a monster big man heel. It was during this time that he also started using toothpicks and debuted his trademark toothpick fling. He squashed Tommy Rich in his debut on the June 14 edition of Clash of the Champions XV, and he defeated Tom Zenk at The Great American Bash. Hall received a significant push in his early days with WCW, but by the end of 1991 this began to fade, starting with the September 2 edition of Clash of the Champions XVI, where Studd was defeated by Ron Simmons. At Halloween Havoc: Chamber of Horrors, the team of Studd, Abdullah the Butcher, Cactus Jack, and Big Van Vader lost to Sting, El Gigante, and the Steiner Brothers (Rick and Scott). On the November 19 edition of Clash of the Champions XVII, Studd lost to Zenk in a rematch from The Great American Bash.

With rumors that WCW wanted to take the Diamond Studd away from him, DDP decided to take the advice of Magnum T. A. and begin to wrestle himself. He headed to the WCW Power Plant where Buddy Lee Parker, The Assassin, and Dusty Rhodes trained the 35-year-old rookie. He debuted as a wrestler in a tag team match later that year. With the Diamond Studd, he faced Kevin Sullivan and his partner. He was relegated to the "jobber" list. He made his wrestling pay-per-view debut at Starrcade in 1991, teaming with Mike Graham in a losing effort to Jushin Thunder Liger and Bill Kazmaier. Page continued wrestling and brought other wrestlers into his stable, such as Scotty Flamingo (who later became better known as Raven) and Vinnie Vegas (Kevin Nash) in 1992. The relationships between DDP, Flamingo, and Vegas were used in many angles over the following months. Page went in the corner of Scotty Flamingo, at Clash of the Champions XXI on November 18, 1992, when Flamingo fought Johnny B. Badd in a worked boxing match. Flamingo won this bout with a little help from Page and Vinnie Vegas who filled Flamingo's glove with water. Studd formed short-lived tag teams with Vinnie Vegas and Scotty Flamingo, while also teaming with members of Paul E. Dangerously's Dangerous Alliance, a stable that also included Madusa. The idea of adding him to the Dangerous Alliance fell through, however, and he left WCW shortly after.

The following year, after Scotty Flamingo also left the stable, Page teamed with Vinnie Vegas as the Vegas Connection. The Vegas Connection never returned to WCW until 2001 under the name "The Insiders", because Page was fired from WCW shortly after the team's debut due to his torn rotator cuff. The injury occurred in late 1992 in a tag match with Tex Slazenger and Shanghai Pierce (later known as The Godwinns).

== Members ==
- Diamond Exchange (1988–1989)
  - Badd Company (Paul Diamond and Pat Tanaka)
  - Col. DeBeers
  - Curt Hennig
  - Madusa Miceli
- Diamond Mine (1991–1992)
  - The Fabulous Freebirds (Michael Hayes, Jimmy Garvin, and Badstreet)
  - Scotty Flamingo
  - Diamond Studd
  - Vinnie Vegas
- Manager
  - Diamond Dallas Page
- Diamond Dolls
  - Jennifer (AWA)
  - Kimberly Page (WCW; 1991, 1994–95)
  - Lee Ann (AWA, WCW; 1987–88, 1990–91)
  - Tonya G. (AWA; 1987–88)
  - Torri (AWA)
  - Wendy (AWA; 1987–88)

=== The Diamond Dolls ===
The Diamond Dolls were the professional wrestling valets that accompanied Diamond Dallas Page to the ring in the American Wrestling Association and World Championship Wrestling. When DDP was signed to appear as a manager in the AWA in 1987, he wanted to be over the top. So Page decided to bring along some "Diamond Dolls", pretty women who accompanied him to the ring. They would clean his rings and brush dirt off his coat and strut around the ring to distract his wrestlers' opponents. They were basically there to look good and give his wrestlers an edge.

Page's Diamond Dolls in the AWA were waitresses from Norma Jean's, his bar in Ft. Myers, Florida. They were Tonya G. (real name Tanya), Lee Ann and Wendy. Page claimed to have dated all of them and he says he did date Lee Ann in his biography, Positively Page. Tonya G. was the one that was always there. Page rarely had them all there at one time.

When Page arrived in WCW as the manager of The Diamond Studd and The Fabulous Freebirds, he brought a different Diamond Doll each week. Page's wife, Kimberly Page, made her debut on April 6, 1991, on TBS as one of his Diamond Dolls. When Page started wrestling, he did away with the Diamond Dolls. He brought them back in 1994, when Kimberly became his regular Diamond Doll. She first played a ditzy bimbo, but quickly changed character to innocent and disapproving of his cheating ways. In 1995, she left Page (kayfabe) when Johnny B. Badd freed her from Page in a match. The Diamond Doll name was not used after that as Kimberly went by her first name until leaving the sport in 2000.

== Championships and accomplishments ==
- American Wrestling Association
  - AWA World Heavyweight Championship (1 time) – Curt Hennig
  - AWA World Tag Team Championship (1 time) – Badd Company
  - AWA World Women's Championship (1 time) – Madusa Miceli
- World Championship Wrestling
  - WCW Light Heavyweight Championship (1 time) – Scotty Flamingo
- Pro Wrestling Illustrated
  - PWI Rookie of the Year (1988) – Madusa Miceli
