= Pat Tanaka =

American professional wrestler (born 1961)

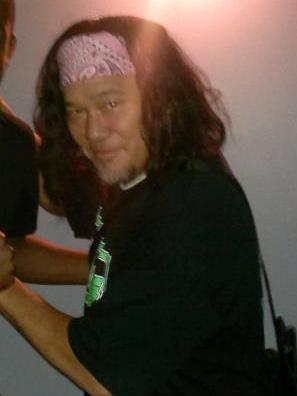
- Tanaka in 2012

Personal information
- Born: Patrick Tanaka; August 5, 1961 (age 65) Honolulu, Hawaii, U.S.
- Family: Duke Keomuka (father)

Professional wrestling career
- Ring name(s): El Gato; Goku-Do; Pat Tanaka; Tanaka-San
- Billed height: 5 ft 10 in (178 cm)
- Billed weight: 225 lb (102 kg)
- Billed from: Honolulu, Hawaii; Tokyo, Japan (as part of The Orient Express); Sapporo, Japan (as Tanaka-San); Mexico City, Mexico (as El Gato)
- Trained by: Duke Keomuka; Hiro Matsuda; NJPW Dojo
- Debut: April 7, 1984
- Retired: June 26, 2021

Patrick Tanaka (born August 5, 1961) is an American professional wrestler best known for his work in the American Wrestling Association (AWA) as one half of Badd Company and the World Wrestling Federation (WWF, now WWE) as one half of The Orient Express. He is the son of Duke Keomuka.

In his career, which has spanned more than three decades, Tanaka has worked for the American Wrestling Association (AWA), the World Wrestling Federation (WWF), World Championship Wrestling (WCW), Extreme Championship Wrestling (ECW), the Continental Wrestling Association (CWA) and New Japan Pro-Wrestling.

== Professional wrestling career ==
=== Early career (1984-1986) ===
Trained by his father, Duke Keomuka, Hiro Matsuda, and the New Japan Pro-Wrestling Dojo, Pat Tanaka debuted in 1984 for NJPW. During his time there, he wrestled the likes of Keiichi Yamada, Shunji Kosugi, Black Cat, Naoki Sano, Tatsutoshi Goto, Shinichi Nakano, and Hirokazu Hata. After a year in New Japan, Tanaka started wrestling as a jobber in Jim Crockett Promotions in 1985.

=== Continental Wrestling Association (1986–1988) ===
In 1986, Tanaka moved to Memphis, Tennessee where he worked for Jerry Lawler and Jerry Jarrett’s Continental Wrestling Association. Early on Tanaka teamed with Jeff Jarrett to win the AWA Southern Tag Team Championship. In late 1986 the tag-team specialist Tanaka was teamed up with Paul Diamond, who was also seen as a tag-team specialist, to form Badd Company, a move that paid off pretty soon as the two won the CWA/AWA International Tag Team Championship, beating Tarzan Goto and Akio Sato on December 15, 1986. The first reign was short lived as The Sheepherders (Luke Williams and Butch Miller) defeated the duo on January 10, 1987. Badd Company quickly regained the titles only to lose them to Tarzan Goto and Akio Sato on February 5, 1987. The third reign with the tag-team titles came on May 9, 1987 when the team beat Mark Starr in a handicap match, but lost them back to Starr and his new tag team partner Billy Joe Travis. Badd Company had one last run with the International tag team titles as they won the vacant titles on May 25, 1987 and held them until July 6, 1987 where they lost the titles to Bill Dundee and Rocky Johnson (who were the last International tag team champions). While in Memphis Badd Company also won the CWA's main tag team title, the AWA Southern Tag Team Championship, defeating Jeff Jarrett and Billy Joe Travis on August 8, 1987. They lost the titles to The Nasty Boys just over a month later.

=== American Wrestling Association (1988–1990) ===
After working as a team for almost a year Badd Company moved on from the CWA to the American Wrestling Association. In the AWA they were given identical ring gear, and were accompanied by flamboyant manager Diamond Dallas Page, who always had a number of valets, known as the Diamond Dolls, with him. The team's first feud was against the Midnight Rockers, whom they defeated for the AWA World Tag Team Championship on March 19, 1988. During their year-long title reign Badd Company would feud heavily with Chavo and Mando Guerrero and the team known as the Top Guns (Ricky Rice and Derrick Dukes). They teamed with Madusa Miceli to face the team of the Top Guns and Wendi Richter at the only AWA pay-per-view SuperClash III. Both Badd Company's Tag Team Title and Wendi Richter's AWA World Women's Championship were on the line, but since Richter pinned Miceli, Badd Company remained the Tag Team champions. Diamond and Tanaka's reign ended on March 25, 1989 as they lost to the Olympians (Brad Rheingans and Ken Patera). Shortly after losing their titles they split from Page, and had a short feud against each other before wrestling in singles competition until early 1990.

=== World Wrestling Federation (1990–1994) ===
==== The Orient Express (1990–1992) ====
Tanaka signed with the World Wrestling Federation in 1990, where he formed another tag team called The Orient Express with Akio Sato, managed by Mr. Fuji. While the Orient Express was supposed to represent Japan, both Tanaka and Mr Fuji were born in Hawaii. The Orient Express kicked off a prolonged feud with The Rockers that started at WrestleMania VI, where Sato and Tanaka were victorious via countout, and continued off and on for well over a year. The Orient Express got involved in the Legion of Doom / Demolition feud as Mr. Fuji managed Demolition as well. Demolition was being phased out and the Orient Express began taking on the Legion of Doom instead. The Legion of Doom / Orient Express feud was extremely onesided due to the Legion of Doom's massive size advantage. After WrestleMania VI, Tanaka and Sato only made two pay-per-view appearances while in the WWF. Firstly at SummerSlam 1990 where the team were defeated by "Hacksaw" Jim Duggan and Nikolai Volkoff. At Survivor Series, they were then a part of the Sgt. Slaughter led team The Mercenaries (that also included Boris Zhukov). Sato was pinned by Bushwhacker Butch 1:46 into the match and Tanaka was pinned by Tito Santana only moments later, at 2:13 into the match.

When Akio Sato decided leave the U.S. wrestling scene in the latter days of 1990, the WWF decided to reunite the team known as Badd Company, only this time with Paul Diamond wearing a mask to hide the fact that he was not Asian and using the name of Kato. During this time the team had a very well received match with their old enemies the Rockers at the 1991 Royal Rumble and another against the New Foundation at the 1992 Royal Rumble, which were the only two PPV appearances for the New Orient Express. Sato briefly rejoined the team in 1991 to team with Tanaka and Kato for a series of 6-man tag-team matches on WWF house shows, but Sato left the WWF after only a handful of matches together. The Orient Express was programmed into a feud with the new tandom of Jim Neidhart and Owen Hart - The New Foundation. The two teams would meet at the 1992 Royal Rumble, where the New Foundation was victorious.

==== Singles competition (1992–1994) ====
Tanaka missed a number of appearances in 1991 due to the death of his father, Duke Keomuka, although he returned to finish out his WWF contract (which ended in February 1992) by losing a series of singles squash matches. Tanaka would return for one appearance later in the year, first returning in Boston on March 28 in a losing effort to Virgil.

While doing work for other organizations, Tanaka would make several appearances for the WWF in late 1993 with his martial arts gimmick. His first match back came on September 28, 1993 when he faced 1-2-3 Kid on the October 16th episode of WWF Superstars. Before the match, Tanaka was shown paying respects to WWF World Champion Yokozuna and former manager Mr. Fuji. As the year conclude he was lose to the likes of Marty Jannetty, and Razor Ramon. He also teamed on multiple occasions with Barry Horowitz in matches with Men on a Mission.

He then made a single appearance in November 1994, losing to Doink the Clown.

=== Eastern Championship Wrestling (1993–1994) ===
After Paul Diamond also left the WWF the two reunited as Badd Company to work for Eastern Championship Wrestling (the forerunner to Extreme Championship Wrestling) in 1993. The team made their debut at NWA Bloodfest on October 1, 1993 where they beat The Bad Breed (Ian and Axl Rotten). Later in the night Tanaka and Diamond got a shot at the ECW Tag Team Champions, Tony Stetson and Johnny Hotbody. However, Badd Company lost. The next night at NWA Bloodfest: Part 2 Badd Company came up against one of ECW's new creations Public Enemy (Rocco Rock and Johnny Grunge) in one of their very early matches. Later in the show Badd Company and the Public Enemy would clash again, this time in a three way, steel cage match that also included Bad Breed; this time Public Enemy were victorious. At ECW's next big show Terror at Tabor on November 12, 1993 Badd Company beat the makeshift team of Don E. Allen and Mr. Hughes. After the match Badd Company called out Public Enemy resulting in an impromptu match between Paul Diamond and Rocco Rock which Diamond won. Public Enemy quickly got revenge on Badd Company as they defeated the duo in a "South Philly hood" match the very next day at November to Remember. At Holiday Hell 1993 on December 26, 1993 Tanaka defeated Rocco Rock in a "Body Count" match. In early 1994 Badd Company set their sights on ECW Tag Team Champions Kevin Sullivan and The Tasmaniac, defeating them twice in non-title matches. At The Night the Line Was Crossed on February 5, 1994 Tanaka and his one night only partner The Sheik defeated Sullivan and Tasmaniac, unfortunately the team had been stripped of the titles the night before. When Tanaka was rejoined by Diamond the team lost, once again, to the tag-Team champions when the gold was finally on the line. On March 27, 1994 Badd Company wrestled its last match for ECW, a house show victory over Rockin' Rebel and Pitbull #1.

=== World Championship Wrestling (1994–1998) ===
==== Badd Company (1994–1995) ====
By the time Badd Company wrestled their last match for ECW Tanaka and Diamond had already signed with World Championship Wrestling, Tanaka had even made his on screen debut as Tanaka-San. Paul Diamond showed up with the Kato mask on using the name Haito only days after their last ECW match. The duo reprised their "Orient Express" gimmick but could not use the name since the WWF owned the copyright to it. The two men wrestled a couple of matches together but they never achieved any notoriety in WCW. Badd Company / The Orient Express finally split up for good by the end of 1994. While Paul Diamond left WCW soon after, Tanaka would continue to appear on WCW programming (as Pat Tanaka) as a jobber to the stars.

==== El Gato and lower-card status (1996–1998) ====
In 1996 Tanaka made a few brief appearances as the masked El Gato, most notably against Konnan, who successfully defended the WCW United States Heavyweight Championship against El Gato at The Great American Bash 1996 on June 16, 1996.

Once again billed as Pat Tanaka, he lost to The Giant in an nWo-themed episode of WCW Saturday Night ("nWo Saturday Night", November 2, 1996). The match was pre-taped in an empty arena.

As Tanaka, he notably used ring music that would later become the entrance theme of Bill Goldberg.

=== Independent circuit (1998–2001) ===
In 1999, Tanaka wrestled in Frontier Martial-Arts Wrestling. In 2001, Tanaka returned to New Japan as GOKU-DO. Tanaka also partnered with "High Profile" Dyan Night with his Manager Candilynn Lockhart, The Blonde Geisha, to become known as The New Orient Express.

=== New Japan Pro-Wrestling (2001–2002) ===
In 2001 and 2002, Tanaka toured Japan with New Japan Pro-Wrestling.

=== Late career (2002–2021) ===
In May 2005, Tanaka lost to Atsushi Miyamoto on an episode of Dory Funk's !Bang! TV from Florida. In August 2006, he began a series of short stints and one-off matches on the North American independent circuit, most recently losing to Ace Perry in March 2014 for Evolution Pro Wrestling in Clarksville, Indiana. In 2011, Tanaka became a referee for Micro Championship Wrestling in Hudson, Florida. Tanaka wrestled his last match in 2021.

== Personal life ==
In mid-March 2006, Tanaka opened Fighting Spirit Dojo in Minster, Ohio with shoot-fighter Jody Poff. Poff taught a group of mixed-martial-artists while Tanaka taught judo to more than 50 students. Not long after, Tanaka and Poff moved their dojo to St. Marys, Ohio. Tanaka now resides in Fargo, North Dakota and has opened Tanaka Productions where he trains students to become professional wrestlers.

== Championships and accomplishments ==
- American Wrestling Association
  - AWA World Tag Team Championship (1 time) – with Paul Diamond
- Below Zero Wrestling
  - BZW Tag Team Championship (1 time, current) - with Jake Taylor
- Continental Wrestling Association
  - AWA Southern Tag Team Championship (2 times) – with Paul Diamond (1 time) and Jeff Jarrett (1 time)
  - CWA/AWA International Tag Team Championship (5 times) – with Paul Diamond (4 times) and Jeff Jarrett (1 time)
- Pro Wrestling Illustrated
  - PWI ranked him #355 of the 500 best singles wrestlers during the "PWI Years" in 2003
  - PWI ranked him #99 of the 100 best tag teams of the "PWI Years" with Paul Diamond in 2003
- Universal Wrestling Association
  - UWA/UWF Intercontinental Tag Team Championship (1 time) – with Bulldog K.T.

== See also ==
- Badd Company
- The Orient Express
