= J. T. Southern =

American professional wrestler

- J. T. Southern in WCW

Personal information
- Born: January 4, 1964 (age 62) Nashville, Tennessee, U.S.

Professional wrestling career
- Ring name(s): J. T. Southern; Wolf Wilde
- Billed height: 6 ft 2 in (188 cm)
- Billed weight: 235 lb (107 kg)
- Billed from: Asbury Park, New Jersey; Fort Lauderdale, Florida
- Trained by: Larry Sharpe
- Debut: 1986
- Retired: 1992

J. T. Southern (born January 4, 1964) is an American retired professional wrestler. Though he achieved most notoriety during his 1992 feud with Van Hammer in World Championship Wrestling, Southern also competed for Verne Gagne's American Wrestling Association, Continental Wrestling Association (CWA) in Memphis, Tennessee, and in UWF International in Japan.

== Professional wrestling career ==
=== Continental Wrestling Association (1986–1987) ===
Southern debuted in the Continental Wrestling Association in Memphis in 1986.

=== American Wrestling Association (1987) ===
In June 1987, Southern joined the American Wrestling Association (AWA) where he received a push early on, forming a tag team with D.J. Peterson. He also teamed with Jimmy Snuka and won the International Tag Team Championship. The title belts were later taken from Southern and awarded to The Mercenaries when Snuka left the territory. After a few appearances with the short-lived Oregon Wrestling Federation, Southern then disappeared from the area as well.

=== Various promotions (1987–1991) ===
He next turned up in Windy City Wrestling appearing for its debut show "Battle of the Belts" in Chicago on January 30, 1988. He wrestled on the undercard with Big Bubba in a tag team match against "Playboy" Buddy Rose and Doug Somers. After spending time working the indy circuits (particularly the Continental Wrestling Association, which later evolved into United States Wrestling Association in Memphis, where he first came to prominence), Southern had a brief appearance as Wolfe Wilde, the drummer of "The Tough Guys" band at Clash of the Champions X where he fought Cactus Jack Manson after Jack lost to Mil Máscaras and confronted the band who were playing during the commercial break.

=== UWF International (1991–1992) ===
In June 1991, Southern traveled to Japan to try his hand at UWF International (a hybrid of wrestling and kickboxing). He was one of several Tennessee-based wrestlers recruited to UWFi by Shinji Sasazaki, a retired wrestler who scouted for the company while living in Tennessee and working in a Japanese restaurant. He made his debut against Nobuhiko Takada but was dismissed by one commentator as "pretty but ineffective" as he lost badly - it was the first time in UWFi history that a fighter had failed to take a single point off his opponent.

He went on to lose every one of his fights there against Japanese martial-arts fighters (Kazuo Yamazaki, Tatsuo Nakano and Masahito Kakihara) who ruthlessly exploited his weak defense against their explosive kicks.

Southern was humiliated by Kazuo Yamazaki in Japan

In a particularly one-sided fight, Southern showed so little fighting spirit that his opponent Kazuo Yamazaki was enraged by what he saw as Southern's cowardice. The commentators noted that, as a result, Yamazaki began treating Southern with contempt and a total lack of respect. He proceeded to humiliate him by inflicting upon him several indignities which fellow fighters are normally spared from. Yamazaki showboated, grabbed hold of Southern's leg only to push him down falling unceremoniously onto his backside, then grinded Southern's face into his armpit and later kicked Southern in the face. At one point the referee had stepped in to temporarily halt the fight and check on Southern's wellbeing, but Yamazaki refused to respect the pause and swept Southern's legs from under him anyway, sending him crashing once again onto the floor. Even after Southern had lost the fight by surrendering to Yamazaki's submission hold, Yamazaki refused to release the hold, leaving Southern squirming frantically on the canvas for some time until the referee intervened to rescue him. Southern had endured a torrid time but his ordeal was still not over yet as Yamazaki came back, towered over a demoralised Southern, now collapsed prostrate on the ground and barely able to stand, and continued to taunt him and threaten further punishment. Fortunately, the referee stepped in to stop Yamazaki doing any further damage.

His legs suffered severe bruising, and Southern decided enough was enough and he quit the UWFI after suffering four straight defeats.

=== World Championship Wrestling (1992) ===
He eventually got his big break with World Championship Wrestling (WCW) in 1992 - with long blond locks and good guitar-playing skills, he was given a rock-star wrestler gimmick and was brought in to start a feud with fellow rocker Van Hammer. He made his WCW debut on the March 28 edition WCW Power Hour against Chris Sullivan.

He was known for his garishly camp outfits and flamboyant persona - he would typically come to the ring playing an electric guitar and wearing a fringed tiger-striped jacket and fluorescent shredded tights. His interviews and out-of-ring promotional work were all well-received, but his wrestling skills were widely regarded as below-par and the crowds were not entertained, as Southern made hard work of defeating "jobber" and mid-card wrestlers like Joey Maggs and Firebreaker Chip. Maggs later commented that "J.T. Southern was so bad that I pulled a good match out of him. But the fact that nobody else could get a match out of him made me feel good."

In March 1992, he brought his friend Scotty Flamingo (who had a similar flamboyant spoiled rich-boy gimmick) to WCW as a sidekick to help regenerate interest in his feud with Van Hammer, but before long Flamingo's popularity had surpassed Southern's and his talent had made him into one of WCW's most marketable stars. With Southern unable to compete with him, he was demoted to the role of being Flamingo's groupie - he would do the ring-entry with Flamingo and remain at ringside for his fights, sometimes interfering if Scotty was struggling.

However, Southern's actual wrestling matches became more and more infrequent - he suffered a few losses to his arch rival Van Hammer (including an embarrassing loss within 40 seconds) but these matches did not get any screen time as other matches were chosen for the TV shows instead. In one of Flamingo's matches against Johnny B. Badd, ring-commentator Tony Schiavone cheekily asked co-commentator Jesse Ventura whether Southern was Flamingo's manager. His lack of prowess in the ring led to insiders cheekily suggesting that 'J. T.' stood for "Just Terrible". Southern was released by WCW in the summer of 1992.

=== United States Wrestling Association (1992) ===
After leaving WCW, Southern returned to his old stomping grounds in Memphis, where the CWA was now known as the United States Wrestling Association (USWA). However, after wrestling two matches, he was released from the company. He retired in 1992.

== Personal life ==
Southern is now retired from wrestling altogether, but has instead made a successful career in racing vintage and post-vintage motocross bikes-mainly in American Historic Racing Motorcycle Association events. He writes for VMX Magazine and runs Jake's Garage in Nashville, Tennessee where he has gained widespread acclaim on the national vintage motocross circuit for his innovative designs. He also finds time to compete in some of the races competitively himself. He is known for his sportsmanship and generosity with fellow competitors, where he can be seen racing several national AHRMA events annually.

== Championships and accomplishments ==
- Continental Wrestling Association

- CWA/AWA International Tag Team Championship (1 time) – with Jimmy Snuka
