= Paul Diamond =

Canadian professional wrestler (born 1961)

Personal information
- Born: Thomas Boric; May 11, 1961 (age 65) Zagreb, SR Croatia, SFR Yugoslavia
- Spouses: Lisa Motley; Dawn Doyle
- Children: 2

Professional wrestling career
- Ring name(s): Paul Diamond; Venum; The Comet Kid; Kato; Haito; Maximillion Moves; Max Moon
- Billed height: 6 ft 2 in (188 cm)
- Billed weight: 240 lb (109 kg)
- Billed from: Thunder Bay, Ontario, Canada; Tokyo, Japan (as Kato); Nagoya, Japan (as Haito); Outer Space (as Max Moon)
- Trained by: Boris Malenko; Dean Malenko; Joe Malenko; Chris Adams
- Debut: 1985
- Retired: 2013

Tom Boric
Personal information
- Full name: Thomas Boric
- Position: Goalkeeper

College career
Years	Team	Apps	(Gls)
1979–1980	Old Dominion Monarchs		

Senior career*
Years	Team	Apps	(Gls)
1980–1981	Calgary Boomers (indoor)	1	(0)
1981	Calgary Boomers		(0)
1982–1984	Tampa Bay Rowdies	15	(0)
1983	Tampa Bay Rowdies (indoor)	2	(0)
- * Club domestic league appearances and goals

Thomas Boric (born May 11, 1961) is a Croatian retired professional wrestler better known by his ring name Paul Diamond. He is best known for being one half of the tag team Badd Company with Pat Tanaka and for his time in the World Wrestling Federation as Kato, one half of The Orient Express, also with Tanaka, and later Max Moon. Before he was a professional wrestler, Boric was a professional Association Football player.

== Early life ==
Boric was born in Zagreb, Croatia in 1961 and grew up wanting to follow in his father's footsteps and become a soccer player. When Boric was 13 years old the family emigrated from Croatia to Canada, settling down in Winnipeg, Manitoba. Tom got a full soccer scholarship to Old Dominion University in Norfolk, Virginia.

== Professional soccer career ==
After only three semesters at college, Boric was selected as the 6th overall pick of the 1981 NASL draft to play goalkeeper for the recently formed Calgary Boomers of the North American Soccer League. After the Boomers folded in 1981, Boric moved on to the Tampa Bay Rowdies whom he played for until the NASL closed for good in 1984.

After his professional soccer career ended, Boric began training for a professional wrestling career at a Tampa Bay wrestling school run by Boris Malenko along with his two sons Joe Malenko and Dean Malenko who all had a hand in training him.

== Professional wrestling career ==
=== Texas-All Star Wrestling (1985–1986) ===
After training, Boric began wrestling as "Paul Diamond" in 1985. (The name had been previously used by Toronto-born wrestler Paul Lehman in the 1960s.) His first break came in the Texas All-Star Wrestling promotion in San Antonio, Texas. He initially formed a tag team called American Breed with Nick Kiniski (son of legendary wrestler Gene Kiniski) in Fred Barend's Texas All-Star Wrestling. Neither Diamond nor Kiniski were actually American, (Diamond is Croatian/Canadian while Kiniski is Canadian) so the team name was quite ironic.

The team won the TASW Tag Team Championship from the Maoris (Tudui and Wakahi) on May 25, 1985, and held them until Al Madrill and Chavo Guerrero took the titles from them on June 5, 1985. The titles would be vacated later that same month when Chavo Guerrero refused to wrestle in a rematch against Diamond and Kiniski because Chavo's father Gory Guerrero was the special referee chosen for the match. Madrill teamed up with Black Gorman instead but lost the match. After the match, Madrill attacked Chavo Guerrero splitting the team and forcing the titles to be held up.

When Chavo won the rights to name a new partner he chose to give the titles to American Breed instead, only now American Breed consisted of Paul Diamond and a rookie named Shawn Michaels, as Kiniski had left the promotion a few weeks prior. They feuded for a short time with Toshiaki Kawada and Hiromichi Fuyuki, who were called The Japanese Force.

Diamond and Michaels lost and then regained the titles from the "Masked Hoods" (Ricky Santana and Tony Torres) before being beaten for the titles on January 27, 1986, by Al Madrill and Magnificent Zulu. Both Michaels and Diamond began to add more to their wrestling skills, thanks in part to fellow wrestler Chris Adams, who split his time between World Class Championship Wrestling and Texas All-Star at the time.

=== Continental Wrestling Association (1986–1988) ===
In 1986, Diamond moved on to Memphis, Tennessee, where he worked for Jerry Lawler and Jerry Jarrett's Continental Wrestling Association. In the fall of 1986 Diamond teamed up with a young Jeff Jarrett to win the CWA/AWA International Tag Team Championship from Tarzan Goto and Akio Sato on November 3, 1986. The team lost the titles back to Goto and Sato less than 2 weeks later. In late 1986, the tag team specialist Diamond was teamed up with Pat Tanaka, who was also seen as a tag team specialist, to form Badd Company. They held the federation's tag team titles four times and the two won the CWA/AWA International Tag Team Championship, beating Tarzan Goto and Akio Sato on December 15, 1986. The first reign was short lived as The Sheepherders (Luke Williams and Butch Miller) defeated the young duo on January 10, 1987. Badd Company quickly regained the titles only to lose them to Tarzan Goto and Akio Sato on February 5, 1987. The third run with the tag team titles came on May 9, 1987, when the team beat Mark Starr in a handicap match, but lost them back to Mark Starr and his new tag team partner Billy Joe Travis. Badd Company had one last run with the International tag team titles as they won the vacant titles on May 25, 1987 and held them until July 6, 1987, where they lost the titles to Bill Dundee and Rocky Johnson (who were the last International tag team champions).

Badd Company also won the CWA's main tag team titles in Memphis, when they defeated Jeff Jarrett and Billy Joe Travis for the AWA Southern Tag Team Championship on August 8, 1987. Tanaka and Diamond soon lost them as the Nasty Boys took the gold from them just over a month later.

=== American Wrestling Association (1988–1990) ===
After working as a team for almost a year, Badd Company moved on from the CWA to the American Wrestling Association. In the AWA, they were given identical ring gear and were accompanied by flamboyant manager Diamond Dallas Page, who always had a number of valets, known as the Diamond Dolls, with him.

The team's first feud was against The Midnight Rockers, whom they defeated for the AWA World Tag Team Championship on March 19, 1988. During their year long title reign, Badd Company would feud heavily with Chavo and Mando Guerrero and the team known as the Top Guns (Ricky Rice and Derrick Dukes). They teamed with Madusa Miceli to face the team of the Top Guns and Wendi Richter at the first AWA PPV, SuperClash III. Both Badd Company's Tag Team Title and Wendi Richter's AWA World Women's Championship were on the line, but since Richter pinned Miceli, Badd Company remained the champions. Diamond and Tanaka's reign ended on March 25, 1989, as they lost to "the Olympians" (Brad Rheingans and Ken Patera). Shortly after losing their titles they split from Page, and had a short feud against each other before wrestling in singles competition until early 1990. Just before moving to the WWF, Diamond teamed with The Trooper Del Wilkes for a short run at the AWA Tag Team Titles against The Destruction Crew (Mike Enos and Wayne Bloom). Diamond and Trooper actually defeated The Destruction Crew, but were not awarded the titles when it was determined that Diamond pinned the wrong person. AWA folded in August 1990.

=== World Wrestling Federation (1990–1993) ===
==== Debut and The Orient Express (1990–1992) ====
Diamond signed with the World Wrestling Federation in 1990, working mainly on the lower card against Dustin Rhodes, Hillbilly Jim, and Al Perez, usually in a losing role. Orient Express member Akio Sato decided to take a position in the Titan (WWF) front office, focusing on the WWF television rights sold to Japan TV networks following the 1990 Survivor Series. Following Survivor Series 1990, the "C-team" house shows were no longer taking place and many wrestlers left television following the event. The move left Pat Tanaka without a partner in The Orient Express. The WWF decided to reunite the team known as Badd Company, only this time with Paul Diamond wearing a mask to hide the fact that he was not Asian and using the name of Kato. During this time, the team had a very well received match with their old enemies the Rockers at the 1991 Royal Rumble, and match against the New Foundation at the 1992 Royal Rumble, which were the only PPV appearances for the New Orient Express. Kato spent a great deal of the 1992 campaign flying solo, posting a notable victory over The Brooklyn Brawler at Maple Leaf Gardens on February 9, 1992, in addition to collecting wins against the likes of grinders such as Jim Powers, Phil Apollo, JW Storm, Kid Collins, and Dale Wolfe. He also would serve as the first opponent for the re-debut of Crush under his "Kona Crush" persona.

Sato briefly rejoined the team in 1991 to team with Tanaka and Kato for a series of 6-man tag-team matches on WWF house shows, but left the WWF after only a handful of matches. Tanaka would leave the WWF in early 1992. Diamond continued to wrestle as Kato until that October, primarily being used as an enhancement talent.

==== Max Moon (1992–1993) ====
In the fall of 1992, Diamond got a brand new gimmick in "Maximillian Moon" ("Max Moon" for short). Diamond wasn't originally intended to play Max Moon. The gimmick, then called Relampago, was created for Konnan, but Konnan left the WWF after a backstage disagreement. Since Diamond fit the costume, he was chosen to take over the character. The suit was a very elaborate powder blue bodysuit with markings that were supposed to look like a circuit board and white protruding rings around his arms making him look rather "outlandish". The elaborate outfit also came with two wrist devices that shot out fireworks and a jet pack that was supposed to make Max Moon look like a man of the future.

Diamond debuted as the Komet Kid and then would change his name to Max Moon. He would wrestle and defeat Terry Taylor in a series of house show matches during the rest of 1992, but otherwise, his biggest victories came against Rick Martel and Repo Man, both by disqualification. On the December 7, 1992, episode of WWF Prime Time Wrestling, Max Moon teamed with High Energy (Owen Hart and Koko B. Ware) in a six-man tag team match against The Beverly Brothers and The Genius. Max Moon and High Energy won the match when Moon pinned The Genius.

On January 11, 1993, Max Moon wrestled and lost an Intercontinental Championship match to former tag team partner/longtime rival Shawn Michaels on the very first Monday Night Raw. The loss to Michaels was a sign of things to come for the Max Moon gimmick as he began losing to midcarders such as Skinner. The Max Moon gimmick only appeared at one PPV, participating in the 30 Man Elimination match at the 1993 Royal Rumble, where he was in the ring less than 2 minutes. In late February, Paul Diamond's contract with the WWF expired and was not renewed.

=== Various promotions (1993) ===
After leaving WWF, Diamond worked in the independent circuit, and Australia as Max Moon. In the summer of 1993, Diamond would debut for New Japan Pro Wrestling under his real name.

=== Eastern Championship Wrestling / Extreme Championship Wrestling (1993–1994) ===
Diamond and Pat Tanaka reunited as "Badd Company" to work for Eastern Championship Wrestling (the forerunner to "Extreme Championship Wrestling") in late 1993. The team made their debut at NWA Bloodfest: Part 1 on October 1, 1993, where they beat the Bad Breed (Ian Rotten and Axl Rotten). Tanaka and Diamond got a shot at the ECW Tag Team Champions Tony Stetson and Johnny Hotbody later in the night, which Badd Company lost.

The next night at NWA Bloodfest: Part 2, Badd Company fought against Public Enemy (Rocco Rock and Johnny Grunge) in one of their very early matches. Later in the show, Badd Company and the Public Enemy would clash again, this time in a Three way, steel cage match that also included Bad Breed. This time, Public Enemy was victorious. At Terror at Tabor on November 12, 1993, Badd Company beat the makeshift team of Don E. Allen and Mr. Hughes. After the match, Badd Company called out Public Enemy resulting in an impromptu match between Paul Diamond and Rocco Rock which Diamond won. Public Enemy quickly got very brutal revenge on Badd Company as they defeated the duo in a "South Philly hood" match the very next day at November to Remember. At Holiday Hell 1993 on December 26, Pat Tanaka defeated Rocco Rock in a "Body Count" match.

As 1993 turned to 1994, Badd Company set their sights on ECW Tag Team Champions Kevin Sullivan and The Tasmaniac; they defeated them twice in non-title matches. At The Night the Line Was Crossed on February 5, 1994, Tanaka and his one night only partner The Sheik defeated Sullivan and The Tasmaniac. Unfortunately, the team had been stripped of the titles the night before. When Tanaka was rejoined by Diamond, the team lost to the (once again) Tag Team Champions when the gold was finally on the line. On March 27, 1994, Badd Company wrestled their last match for ECW, a house show victory over Rockin' Rebel and Pitbull #1.

=== World Championship Wrestling (1994) ===
By the time Badd Company wrestled its last match for ECW, Tanaka and Diamond had already signed with World Championship Wrestling; Tanaka had even made his on screen debut as "Tanaka-San". Paul Diamond showed up with the Kato mask on using the name "Haito" (sometimes spelled "Hyeeto") only days after their last ECW match. The duo reprised their "Orient Express" gimmick but could not use the name since the WWF owned the trademark to it. The two men wrestled a couple of matches together but they never achieved any notoriety in WCW. Badd Company / The Orient Express finally split up for good by the end of 1994.

=== Later Career (1994–2001) ===
After leaving ECW and WCW in 1994, Diamond worked for IWA in Puerto Rico. Later that year he worked for New Japan Pro-Wrestling as Max Moon but the costume was yellow. Also, he began working in the independent circuit. In 1996 he worked for American Wrestling Federation as Kato.

Diamond worked for Jerry Lawler's promotions in Memphis for the United States Wrestling Association in 1997 where he held the USWA World Tag Team Championship alongside Steven Dunn. After USWA folded in September 1997, Diamond worked for IWA Mid-South for a couple of months in late 1997 where he feuded with Bull Pain.

After the IWA Mid-South, he worked for "Music City Wrestling" until a torn triceps muscle put him out of action for six months in 1998. He worked for Power Pro Wrestling from 1998 to 1999.

Diamond had set up an agreement to join Shawn Michaels' Texas Wrestling Academy. Diamond also wrestled for the Texas Wrestling Alliance under the name of "Venom", holding the TWA title twice and also being involved in Shawn Michaels return to wrestling after a 1998 back injury that was thought to have put a permanent end to his wrestling career. When Michaels handed the wrestling academy to head trainer Rudy Gonzalez, Diamond and his family moved to Tampa then to Winnipeg where Diamond opened up a wrestling school called "Paul Diamond Hard Knocks Pro Wrestling Academy," while helping out his terminally ill father. Diamond return for two show at WWF house shows as the TWA champion defeating Funaki on September 18 and 19, 1999 in San Antonio and Austin, Texas. On April 4, 2000, he lost to Shawn Michaels in a Hardcore Street Fight. Diamond worked for Canadian Wrestling Federation in Winnipeg from 2000 to 2001.

Diamond retired from active competition in 2001 to focus on the wrestling academy.

=== Return to ECW (1997–1998) ===
Diamond made his return to Extreme Championship Wrestling in September 1997. His role was more of a jobber losing to Rob Van Dam, Tommy Dreamer, Spike Dudley and Justin Credible. He had a feud with Al Snow. Diamond defeated Snow at "Fright Fight", but lost to him at Ultimate Jeopardy and Better Than Ever. The feud continued into 1998 with Snow getting the majority of the wins due to his Head gimmick getting over.

=== Return to Wrestling (2005–2008, 2013) ===
In 2005 Diamond returned to action for the first time in four years. His only active involvement has been Rocket City Wrestling in Huntsville, Alabama, wrestling sometimes twice, as Diamond and as Max Moon while also being involved in the booking. He reunited with Tanaka for the first time in 12 years on March 25, 2006, for Blue Water Championship Wrestling in Port Huron, Michigan as they lost to Kevin Baker and Michael Barnes. They continued teaming until their last match on April 18, 2008, defeating Joshua Masters and Kennedy Kendrick for All-Star Wrestling Florida in Port Richey, Florida. Then Diamond was inactive from wrestling.

Diamond wrestled his last match on June 3, 2013 teaming with Jeff McAllister losing to Hoodlum and Mercury Yaden for Rocky Pro Wrestling in Aurora, Colorado.

== Personal life ==
In May 2012, he began working for the Decatur Parks and Recreation Department. He was married to Lisa Motley, who sometimes worked as his valet Cherry Velvet. They have two children (Kiana and Quentin). Quentin played goalie (like his father) in Huntsville for Bob Jones High School's top ranked soccer team and in April 2015 signed an athletic scholarship to play at Tennessee Wesleyan College. He is currently married to Dawn Doyle.

== Championships and accomplishments ==
- American Wrestling Association
  - AWA World Tag Team Championship (1 time) – with Pat Tanaka
- Canadian Wrestling Federation
  - CWF Heavyweight Championship (1 time)
- Central Wrestling Federation
  - CWF Tag Team Championship (1 time) - with Tracy Smothers
- Continental Wrestling Association
  - AWA Southern Tag Team Championship (1 time) – with Pat Tanaka
  - CWA International Tag Team Championship (5 times) – with Pat Tanaka (4), and Jeff Jarrett (1)
- Mountain Wrestling Association
  - MWA Light Heavyweight Championship (1 time)
- Pro Wrestling Illustrated
  - PWI ranked him #158 of the best 500 singles wrestlers in the PWI 500 in 1992
  - PWI ranked him # 99 of the 100 best tag teams of the "PWI Years" with Pat Tanaka in 2003
- Texas All-Star Wrestling
  - TASW Texas Tag Team Championship (3 times) – with Nick Kiniski (1), and Shawn Michaels (2)
  - TASW Six-Man Tag Team Championship (1 time) - with DJ Peterson and Shawn Michaels
- Texas Wrestling Alliance
  - TWA Heavyweight Championship (2 times)
- United States Wrestling Association
  - USWA World Tag Team Championship (1 time) – with Steven Dunn
- International Wrestling Association
  - IWA Southern Heavyweight Championship (1 time)
