= Mark Starr =

English professional wrestler (1962–2013)

Personal information
- Born: Mark Ashford-Smith; 26 December 1962 Staffordshire, England
- Died: 7 June 2013 (aged 50) Brandon, Florida, U.S.
- Relative: Chris Champion (brother)

Professional wrestling career
- Ring name(s): Doink the Clown; Mark Ashford-Smith; Mark Starr
- Billed height: 180 cm (5 ft 11 in)
- Billed weight: 107 kg (236 lb)
- Debut: 1986
- Retired: 1998

Mark Ashford-Smith (26 December 1962 – 7 June 2013), best known by his ring name Mark Starr, was an English professional wrestler.

== Early life ==
Mark Ashford-Smith was born in Staffordshire on 26 December 1962. His older brother Chris was also a professional wrestler under the name Chris Champion, and the two often teamed together.

== Wrestling career ==
=== Continental Wrestling Association (1986–1989) ===
Starr debuted in 1986 and competed in the Memphis-based Continental Wrestling Association (CWA). His first championship came in 1987 when he teamed with veteran wrestler Steve Keirn to win the CWA International Tag Team Championship on April 27, 1987. They held the title belts for twelve days before dropping them to the team of Paul Diamond and Pat Tanaka. The CWA had an agreement with the American Wrestling Association (AWA) that allowed AWA titles to be defended in the CWA. This arrangement enabled Starr to compete for the AWA Southern Tag Team Championship by teaming with Billy Travis in a tournament for the vacant title. On June 8, 1987, Starr and Travis defeated Phil Hickerson and Mr. Shima to win the belts, which they held for almost a month.

Starr competed alongside his real-life brother, Christopher Ashford-Smith, who competed as Chris Champion, for several years and in multiple promotions. Despite their relationship, they used different last names during their time in the same promotion. In Memphis, the brothers formed a tag team known as Wild Side. They competed as a team in the 1988 Jim Crockett Sr. Memorial Cup tag team tournament. They defeated the Mexican Twin Devils in the first round before being eliminated by The Powers of Pain (The Barbarian and The Warlord). The brothers faced Action Jackson and Starr's former partner Billy Travis on July 3, 1989 for the CWA Tag Team Championship. The match ended in a no contest, and the title was held up pending a rematch. One week later, Starr and Champion defeated the former champions to win the title. They held the belts until September, when they dropped them to The Rock 'n' Roll Express.

=== Professional Wrestling Federation, Frontier Martial-Arts Wrestling and Japan (1989–1996) ===
Starr later competed in the Florida-based Professional Wrestling Federation (PWF), where he held the PWF Tag Team Championship on two occasions. He teamed with Lou Perez to defeat Jumbo Baretta and Dennis Knight on November 12, 1989 for the first win. Their reign lasted for four days, but Starr regained the championship the following year after the title was declared vacant. He joined up with Sgt. Rock to defeat Joe Gomez and Hurricane Walker to win the belts. Starr's first championship as a singles wrestler, and the final title of his career, came the following year. He defeated Ricky Fuji to win Frontier Martial-Arts Wrestling's AWA World Light Heavyweight Championship, a title formerly recognized by the AWA. Then in 1992 he left Frontier Martial Arts Wrestling (FMW) and went to Pro Wrestling Fujiwara Gumi (PWFG). In 1995 he left PWFG and returned to FMW. Also worked for Fighting Network Rings and Tokyo Pro Wrestling. He wrestled his last match in Japan in 1996.

=== World Wrestling Federation and Various Promotions (1994–1995) ===
After Japan, Starr worked in various promotions in Puerto Rico, and the United States. On October 29, 1994 he dressed up as Doink the Clown at a NWC event in Las Vegas losing to Greg Valentine.

He worked for World Wrestling Federation (WWF) in late 1994 and early 1995 losing to Razor Ramon, Lex Luger, British Bulldog and Adam Bomb.

=== World Championship Wrestling (1993–1998) ===
==== Enhancement talent (1993–1995) ====
He remained with the company for several months before joining World Championship Wrestling (WCW). In WCW, he competed in the battle royal main events at the company's 1995 and 1996 World War 3 pay-per-views but was not victorious in either. Although these were his only televised appearances at WCW pay-per-views, he also competed in dark matches at Uncensored 1995, Slamboree 1995, and Bash at the Beach 1995, losing to Alex Wright, Sgt. Craig Pittman, and Road Warrior Hawk, respectively.

==== Men at Work (1995–1996) ====
In his later career, Starr formed a tag team known as Men at Work with Chris Kanyon in WCW. The team faced many of WCW's top tag teams, but lost the majority of their matches. One notable victory came on the January 10, 1996 episode of WCW Saturday Night, when they defeated former WCW World Tag Team Champions Bunkhouse Buck and Dick Slater.

==== Final years and retirement (1996–1998) ====
Starr also competed as a singles wrestler, once again playing the role of a jobber. In one match, he teamed with Cobra, Prince Iaukea, and Rex King to face The Giant in a handicap match, which The Giant won in 38 seconds. He was also one of the many opponents defeated by Bill Goldberg during Goldberg's 173-match winning streak.

He would go on to challenge Dean Malenko and Ultimo Dragon for the WCW Cruiserweight Championship in 1997. One of Mark's most important final matches on WCW Monday Nitro was the infamous loss in the Superdome in New Orleans, to Diamond Dallas Page in 54 seconds. Starr's final match of his career took place against Sick Boy at Nitro on February 16, 1998.

He retired in 1998, due to a back injury.

== Death ==
On 7 June 2013, at the age of 50, Starr died from a heart attack at his home in Brandon, Florida.

== Championships and accomplishments ==
- Continental Wrestling Association
  - AWA Southern Tag Team Championship (1 time) – with Billy Travis
  - CWA International Tag Team Championship (2 times) – with Steve Keirn (1) Billy Joe Travis (1)
  - CWA Tag Team Championship (1 time) – with Chris Champion
- Frontier Martial-Arts Wrestling
  - AWA World Light Heavyweight Championship (1 time)
- Professional Wrestling Federation
  - PWF Tag Team Championship (2 times) – with Lou Perez (1) and Sgt. Rock (1)
