= Royal Rumble (1991) =

World Wrestling Federation pay-per-view event

- Promotional poster by Joe Jusko, featuring various WWF wrestlers
- Promotion: World Wrestling Federation
- Date: January 19, 1991
- City: Miami, Florida
- Venue: Miami Arena
- Attendance: 16,000
- Tagline(s): Friend vs Friend, Foe vs Foe; It's Every Man for Himself!

Pay-per-view chronology
← Previous; Survivor Series	Next → WrestleMania VII

Royal Rumble chronology
← Previous; 1990	Next → 1992

The 1991 Royal Rumble was a professional wrestling pay-per-view (PPV) event produced by the World Wrestling Federation (WWF, renamed WWE in 2002). It was the fourth annual Royal Rumble event and took place on Saturday, January 19, 1991, at the Miami Arena in Miami, Florida, which was the first Royal Rumble held on a Saturday, as the prior events were held on the traditional Sunday night. The event centered on the men's Royal Rumble match, a modified 30-man battle royal in which the participants enter at timed intervals instead of all beginning in the ring at the same time.

Seven matches were contested at the event, including one dark match. The main event was the 1991 Royal Rumble match, which was won by Hulk Hogan, who last eliminated Earthquake, making Hogan the first multi-time and back-to-back Royal Rumble winner. In other featured matches on the undercard, Sgt. Slaughter defeated Ultimate Warrior to win the WWF Championship, Ted DiBiase and Virgil defeated Dusty Rhodes and Dustin Rhodes, The Mountie defeated Koko B. Ware, and The Rockers (Marty Jannetty and Shawn Michaels) defeated The Orient Express (Kato and Tanaka).

== Production ==
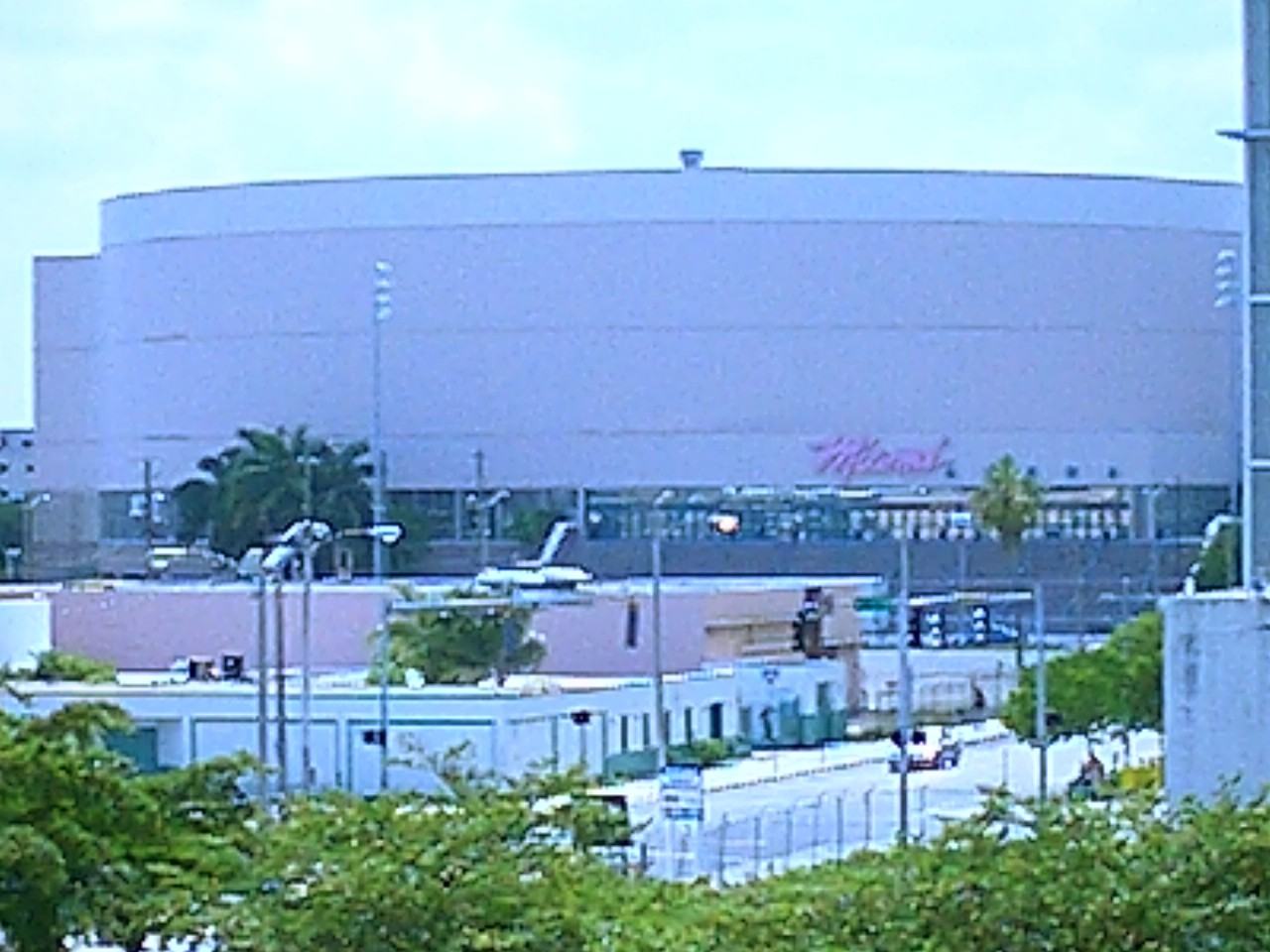
The fourth annual Royal Rumble event was held at Miami Arena in Miami, Florida.

=== Background ===
The Royal Rumble is an annual professional wrestling event, produced every January by the World Wrestling Federation (WWF, renamed WWE in 2002) since 1988; that first event was a television special before it became an annual pay-per-view (PPV) beginning in 1989. It is one of the promotion's original four PPVs, along with WrestleMania, SummerSlam, and Survivor Series, referred to as the "Big Four". It It is named after and centered on the men's Royal Rumble match, a modified battle royal in which the participants enter at timed intervals instead of all beginning in the ring at the same time, and the match generally features 30 wrestlers. The fourth Royal Rumble event was scheduled to be held on Saturday, January 19, 1991, at the Miami Arena in Miami, Florida. This was the first Royal Rumble held on a Saturday, as the prior events were held on the traditional Sunday night.

=== Storylines ===
The card consisted of seven matches that resulted from scripted storylines. Results were predetermined by WWF's writers, with storylines produced on their weekly television shows; Superstars, Wrestling Challenge, and Prime Time Wrestling.

The main feud heading into the Royal Rumble was between the WWF World Heavyweight Champion Ultimate Warrior, who had been champion since defeating Hulk Hogan at WrestleMania VI on April 1, 1990, and Sgt. Slaughter, who had returned to the WWF in 1990 and became a villainous (heel) sympathizer of the Iraqi government. Their feud began building during a time when the United States was engaged in Operation Desert Shield (which became Operation Desert Storm on January 17, two days before the Royal Rumble). During the build-up to their match, Slaughter and his manager, General Adnan, cut several anti-American promos to build heat for the event; at one point, Slaughter unwrapped a present and revealed a pair of boots purportedly sent to him by Iraqi dictator Saddam Hussein. In the meantime, "Macho King" Randy Savage challenged Warrior to a series of matches, which Warrior successfully answered.

== Event ==
Other on-screen personnel
Role:	Name:
Commentator	Gorilla Monsoon
Commentator	Roddy Piper
Interviewer	Gene Okerlund
Interviewer	Sean Mooney
Ring announcer	Howard Finkel
Official	Shane Stevens
Referees	Fred Sparta
Referees	Mike Chioda
Referees	Earl Hebner
Referees	Joey Marella

=== Main event matches ===
The tag team match pitting Ted DiBiase, and Virgil against Dusty Rhodes, and Rhodes' son, Dustin Rhodes was most notable for Virgil's split from DiBiase. Tensions that had been building between the two in the previous weeks exploded when – after the match – Virgil struck DiBiase in the head with his Million Dollar Championship to turn into a face. DiBiase had verbally abused Virgil throughout the match, and at one point, attacked him and threw him from the ring after he was being dominated by the Rhodes team. DiBiase went on to pin Dusty Rhodes with a roll-up. After the match, DiBiase demanded Virgil bring the Million Dollar Championship into the ring and strap it around his waist. Once he got in the ring, Virgil would drop the belt at DiBiase's feet, to which DiBiase ordered Virgil to pick it up. As DiBiase gloated and then turned back around, Virgil hit him in the face with the championship.

Before the Warrior-Slaughter match at the Royal Rumble, Queen Sherri (Savage's valet) attempted to seduce Warrior into granting Savage a title shot. Warrior refused, enraging Savage. During the match itself, Warrior easily fought off a double-team attack by Adnan and Slaughter, running Adnan off before shredding the Iraqi flag and stuffing it into Slaughter's mouth. As Warrior was attempting to finish off Slaughter, Sherri interfered by grabbing Warrior's leg; Warrior chased Sherri down the aisle before he was attacked by Savage near the platform area. Savage struck Warrior with a spotlight as Slaughter regained his senses and distracted the referee. After several minutes of Slaughter holding the advantage, Warrior rallied and set up Slaughter for the gorilla press slam (Warrior's finishing move). However, Warrior grabbed Sherri (who had returned to ringside) and press slammed her onto Savage, who had also appeared at ringside. This gave Slaughter time to hit a knee strike to Warrior's back. Warrior fell into the ropes, where Savage shattered his royal scepter on Warrior's head while the referee was distracted. Slaughter then hit the unconscious Warrior with an elbow drop and pinned him to win the match and championship. After Warrior came to his senses, he ran backstage to find Savage.

The Royal Rumble marked the continuation of an ongoing feud between Hulk Hogan and Earthquake, whose roots dated to mid-1990 when Earthquake injured Hogan in a sneak attack during "The Brother Love Show". Hogan and Earthquake were the final two competitors in the Royal Rumble, and Hogan eliminated Earthquake to win the Royal Rumble.

The pay-per-view broadcast also included pre-taped comments from fans outside the arena, wishing the United States troops a quick and safe return from the Middle East and an announcement that Hogan would tour military bases across the country to support the troops.

== Reception ==
In the January 28, 1991 issue of his Wrestling Observer Newsletter, Dave Meltzer referred to the match between The Rockers, and The Orient Express as the best WWF pay-per-view match since the WrestleMania III match between Ricky Steamboat, and Randy Savage. Meltzer also wrote that he considered it the best WWF pay-per-view to that point in time. Writing for his website Scott's Blog of Doom in November 2023, wrestling reviewer Scott Keith praised the undercard but called the Royal Rumble Match "a huge disappointment".

A fan vote in the February 11, 1991 issue of the Wrestling Observer Newsletter had 268 out of 328 fans give the show a thumbs up. 41 gave a thumbs down, while 19 gave a thumbs in the middle. The Rockers vs. The Orient Express received the majority of votes for the show's best match, with 157. Koko B. Ware vs. The Mountie received the most votes for the worst match of the night with 98.

== Aftermath ==
Following his WWF World Heavyweight Championship loss, Warrior focused on revenge against Savage, with their first encounter being a steel cage match on January 21 at Madison Square Garden in New York City, which Savage won (with help from Sensational Sherri); Warrior was enraged and – despite being restrained by several referees, and other wrestlers – attacked Sherri after the match by slamming her in the ring. Meanwhile, Warrior was unsuccessful in regaining the title, losing a series of steel cage matches to Slaughter, usually due to interference from Sensational Sherri. Warrior and Savage eventually agreed to a "career vs. career match" at WrestleMania VII, which Warrior won. (Slaughter, meanwhile, also defended his belt against "Hacksaw" Jim Duggan, with Duggan winning a majority of these matches by countout or disqualification.)

Hogan, meanwhile, was named the number-one contender for Slaughter's WWF World Heavyweight Championship. During a promo that took place right after the Slaughter-Warrior match, Gene Okerlund "received word" that Slaughter was defacing the American flag; to which Hogan vowed that Slaughter's reign as World Heavyweight Champion would be short-lived. At WrestleMania VII, Hogan defeated Slaughter to become WWF World Heavyweight Champion for the third time. (Before WrestleMania VII, Hogan defeated Earthquake in a series of "stretcher matches" to finish their feud.) Though Hogan received a title shot against Sgt. Slaughter in WrestleMania, it would not be until 1993 that the Royal Rumble match winner automatically received a WWF World Title shot at the following WrestleMania.

The Barbarian would begin teaming with Haku for tag team matches but were both mired in the midcard. Barbarian would leave WWF in mid-1992 and return to WCW.

Dusty and Dustin Rhodes left the WWF after their match, both returning to WCW, Dusty retired from active wrestling and became a booker and commentator, and Dustin returned to wrestling as "The Natural" and began feuding with Larry Zbyszko and later Terry Taylor. Four years later, Dustin would return to the WWF as the androgynous wrestler "Goldust".

== Home media and streaming ==
The event was released on VHS by Coliseum Video in the United States and in August 1992 by Silver Vision in the United Kingdom. The video included wrestler interviews ahead of the Royal Rumble that weren't originally broadcast. In the UK, customers who purchased the tape directly from Silver Vision were given a free pair of Bret Hart sunglasses.

It was re-released on DVD in the United Kingdom in September 2004 as part of Silver Vision's Tagged Classics range, and was paired with Royal Rumble 1992. This DVD set was not released in the USA.

In 2014, the event was included on the WWE's streaming platform the WWE Network as part of its launch and remained on the service until the platform closed in 2026. In January 2026, WWE uploaded the event to stream freely on their WWE Vault YouTube channel.

== Results ==
No.	Results	Stipulations	Times
1^{D}	Jerry Sags defeated Sam Houston	Singles match	5:25
2	The Rockers (Shawn Michaels and Marty Jannetty) defeated The Orient Express (Kato and Tanaka) (with Mr. Fuji)	Tag team match	19:15
3	Big Boss Man defeated The Barbarian (with Bobby Heenan)	Singles match	14:15
4	Sgt. Slaughter (with General Adnan) defeated Ultimate Warrior (c)	Singles match for the WWF Championship	12:47
5	The Mountie (with Jimmy Hart) defeated Koko B. Ware	Singles match	9:12
6	Ted DiBiase and Virgil defeated Dusty Rhodes and Dustin Rhodes	Tag team match	9:57
7	Hulk Hogan won by last eliminating Earthquake	30-man Royal Rumble match	1:05:17
(c) / – the champion(s) heading into the match; D / – this was a dark match

=== Royal Rumble entrances and eliminations ===
A new entrant came out approximately every 2 minutes.

Draw	Entrant	Order	Eliminated by	Time	Eliminations
1	Bret Hart	4	The Undertaker	20:33	0
2	Dino Bravo	1	Greg Valentine	03:06	0
3	Greg Valentine	15	Hulk Hogan	44:03	1
4	Paul Roma	3	self-elimination	14:05	0
5	The Texas Tornado	7	The Undertaker	24:17	0
6	Rick Martel	26	The British Bulldog	52:17	4
7	Saba Simba	2	Rick Martel	02:27	0
8	Bushwhacker Butch	5	The Undertaker	10:07	0
9	Jake Roberts	6	Rick Martel	12:58	1
10	Hercules	18	Brian Knobbs	37:36	1
11	Tito Santana	16	Earthquake	30:23	0
12	The Undertaker	10	Hawk & Animal	14:16	3
13	Jimmy Snuka	8	Hawk	08:06	0
14	The British Bulldog	27	Earthquake & Brian Knobbs	36:43	3
15	Smash	14	Hulk Hogan	18:22	0
16	Hawk	11	Rick Martel & Hercules	06:37	2
17	Shane Douglas	21	Brian Knobbs	26:23	0
18	Randy Savage	9	(never entered match)	00:00	0
19	Animal	12	Earthquake	06:39	1
20	Crush	19	Hulk Hogan	18:34	0
21	Jim Duggan	13	Mr. Perfect	04:44	0
22	Earthquake	29	Hulk Hogan	24:42	4
23	Mr. Perfect	23	The British Bulldog	16:14	1
24	Hulk Hogan	-	Winner	21:00	7
25	Haku	25	The British Bulldog	13:24	0
26	Jim Neidhart	24	Rick Martel	11:11	0
27	Bushwhacker Luke	17	Earthquake	00:04	0
28	Brian Knobbs	28	Hulk Hogan	10:07	3
29	The Warlord	20	Hulk Hogan	01:35	0
30	Tugboat	22	Hulk Hogan	02:32	0

- Hulk Hogan became the first man to win the Royal Rumble twice.
- Rick Martel set a new longevity record with a time of 52:17.
- Randy Savage no-showed the match and was officially eliminated when the buzzer sounded for the next entrant (Animal).
- First time in royal rumble match history where at least one third of the field (10 Participants) all lasted for at least 20 minutes or more during the match
- Hulk Hogan became the first man to win the Royal Rumble as the #24 entrant
