= CWA/AWA International Tag Team Championship =

Professional wrestling tag team championship

Details
- Promotion: American Wrestling Association; Continental Wrestling Association
- Date established: July 1985
- Date retired: September 1987
Statistics
- First champions: Kenya and Kenyala Kondorie
- Most reigns: Tarzan Goto and Akio Sato (5 reigns)
- Longest reign: Tarzan Goto and Akio Sato (63 days)
- Shortest reign: Badd Company (Paul Diamond and Pat Tanaka) (2 days)

The CWA/AWA International Tag Team Championship (also identified in Pro Wrestling Illustrated magazine as the Mid-Southern International Tag Team Championship and the AWA International Tag Team Championship) was a professional wrestling tag team title defended in the Continental Wrestling Association. It was created in 1985 from the CWA's partnership with the American Wrestling Association. The title was abandoned in 1987 when the CWA was renamed the Championship Wrestling Association, and the original Continental titles were abandoned or unified with others.

== Title history ==
Key
No.	Overall reign number
Reign	Reign number for the specific champion
Days	Number of days held

No.	Champion	Championship change			Reign statistics		Notes	Ref.
No.	Champion	Date	Event	Location	Reign	Days	Notes	Ref.
1	Kenya and Kenyala Kondorie	July 1985	N/A	N/A	1	(Note: The length of the Kondries title reign is too uncertain to calculate.)	Won a tournament final.	
—	Vacated	May 1986	—	—	—	—	Vacated for unknown reasons	
2	Tarzan Goto and Akio Sato	June 1986	N/A	N/A	1	(Note: The exact date Goto and Sato arrived as champions is unknown and the date the championship was vacated is also unknown, putting their title reign at between 1 day and 59 days.)	Won a tournament final.	
—	Vacated	July 1986	—	—	—	—	Title held up after a match against Jeff Jarrett and Pat Tanaka in July 1986.	
3	Tarzan Goto and Akio Sato	July 14, 1986	House show	Memphis, Tennessee	2	42	Defeated Jarrett and Tanaka in a rematch to win the held up title.	
4	Jeff Jarrett and Pat Tanaka	August 25, 1986	House show	Memphis, Tennessee	1	7		
5	Tarzan Goto and Akio Sato	September 1, 1986	House show	Memphis, Tennessee	3	63		
6	Jeff Jarrett and Paul Diamond	November 3, 1986	House show	Memphis, Tennessee	1	12		
7	Tarzan Goto and Akio Sato	November 15, 1986	House show	Memphis, Tennessee	4	30		
8	Badd Company (Paul Diamond (2) and Pat Tanaka (2))	December 15, 1986	House show	Memphis, Tennessee	1	26	This was a stretcher match	
9	The Sheepherders (Luke Williams and Butch Miller)	January 10, 1987	House show	Memphis, Tennessee	1	(Note: The exact date the championship is not documented, which puts the title reign at between 1 day and 21 days.)		
10	Badd Company (Paul Diamond (3) and Pat Tanaka (3))	January 1987	House show	Memphis, Tennessee	2	(Note: The exact date the championship was won has not been documented, putting their reign between 5 and 25 days.)		
11	Tarzan Goto and Akio Sato	February 5, 1987	House show	Memphis, Tennessee	5	25		
12	Jimmy Snuka and J. T. Southern	March 2, 1987	House show	Memphis, Tennessee	1	49		
13	The Mercenaries	April 20, 1987	House show	Memphis, Tennessee	1	7	Awarded the titles when Snuka leaves the promotion.	
14	Steve Keirn and Mark Starr	April 27, 1987	House show	Memphis, Tennessee	1	12		
15	Badd Company (Paul Diamond (4) and Pat Tanaka (4))	May 9, 1987	House show	Memphis, Tennessee	3	2	Defeated Starr in a handicap match.	
16	Billy Travis and Mark Starr (2)	May 11, 1987	House show	Memphis, Tennessee	1	7		
—	Vacated	May 18, 1987	—	—	—	—	Title held up after a match against Bad Company.	
17	Badd Company (Paul Diamond (5) and Pat Tanaka (5))	May 25, 1987	House show	Memphis, Tennessee	4	42		
18	Bill Dundee and Rocky Johnson	July 6, 1987	House show	Memphis, Tennessee	1	(Note: The exact date the championship was abandoned has not been documented, which means the title reign lasted between 57 and 86 days.)		
—	Deactivated	September 1987	—	—	—	—	The championship is abandoned	

== See also ==
- CWA/AWA International Heavyweight Championship
