= Continental Wrestling Association =

Former professional wrestling promotion

- The original CWA Logo
- Acronym: CWA
- Founded: March 20, 1977
- Defunct: 1989
- Style: Memphis Style
- Headquarters: Memphis, Tennessee; Nashville, Tennessee
- Founder: Jerry Jarrett
- Owner(s): Jerry Jarrett; Jerry Lawler
- Parent: Jarrett Promotions, Inc.
- Merged with: World Class Wrestling Association
- Predecessor: NWA Mid-America
- Successor: United States Wrestling Association

Continental Wrestling Association (later the Championship Wrestling Association) was a wrestling promotion managed by Jerry Jarrett. The CWA was the name of the "governing body" for the Championship Wrestling, Inc. promotion which was usually referred to as Mid-Southern Wrestling or the Memphis territory. This promotion was a chief NWA territory during the 1970s and early 1980s while operating out of Tennessee and Kentucky. The CWA was a member of the National Wrestling Alliance until 1986 and affiliated with the American Wrestling Association until 1989. In 1989, the CWA merged with the World Class Wrestling Association to form the United States Wrestling Association thus ceasing to exist as a separate entity. Lance Russell and Dave Brown were the television commentators and hosts for the Memphis territory, including the Continental Wrestling Association.

Throughout the existence of the CWA, there were notable feuds that took place. These feuds included Jerry Lawler vs Bill Dundee in 1977, and Terry Funk vs Jerry Lawler in 1981.

== History ==
=== The split ===
The professional wrestling territory commonly referred to as the “Memphis Area” was originally part of the NWA Mid-America promotion that was founded in the 1940s. It operated in Memphis and Nashville, Tennessee, but also included stops in surrounding cities and states. The "NWA Mid-American" territory featured tag teams in nearly all of its main events, and sometimes featuring only one or two singles matches to complement an evening of tag matches. Such teams as The Von Brauners, The Interns, The Infernos, The Bounty Hunters, Tojo Yamamoto and Jerry Jarrett, Don and Al Green, Bobby Hart and Lorenzo Parente, The Fabulous Kangaroos, Jerry Lawler and Jim White, The Fabulous Fargos, and a host of other teams were regulars. During the mid-1970s the focal point of the territory changed from tag wrestling to singles action.

In the mid-1970s the territory split in two, with separate promoters for each half. Jerry Jarrett was in charge of Memphis, Louisville, Lexington and Evansville while still part of NWA Mid-America, while Nick Gulas, who had been the primary booker, continued to promote the other half of the territory. Many of the wrestlers in the promotion were upset at Gulas for over booking his son George Gulas in the profitable Memphis half of the territory. It was very hard to believe that George could regularly beat his larger more experienced foes. George was given matches and wins over longtime veterans of the territory without "paying his dues". After Jarrett had invested a large sum of money into what he thought was a 10%-share of the promotion and learned that Gulas had tricked him into paying for an option to buy less (which by the time he learned had already expired), he decided to go his own way. Jarrett decided to break away by starting competing cards at the Cook Convention Center in March 1977. Gulas, who lived in Nashville, eventually made "Music City" his home base, running weekly cards at the Fairgrounds and all over mid-Tennessee. Originally Gulas was backed by many of the areas top draws. Jarrett, however, was backed by Jerry Lawler, who had just toppled Jackie Fargo as the headliner of the Memphis area. Gulas did attempt to run shows in Memphis for some time but without the headliner, Lawler, he could not compete. This split between Gulas and Jarrett created the Continental Wrestling Association as a totally separate promotion run by Jarrett. In 1980 after only three years, the Gulas territory folded when Gulas retired and the CWA took over some of the more profitable locations (e.g. Nashville).

=== NWA affiliate (1977–1986) ===
After the split from Nick Gulas, the CWA became a National Wrestling Alliance affiliate, which entitled the CWA to NWA World Heavyweight Championship defenses. The champion regularly toured through the territory defending the title against top contenders. The main title of the CWA was the Southern Heavyweight Title, which was nominally sanctioned by the NWA (into 1978) or the AWA (beginning in 1978).

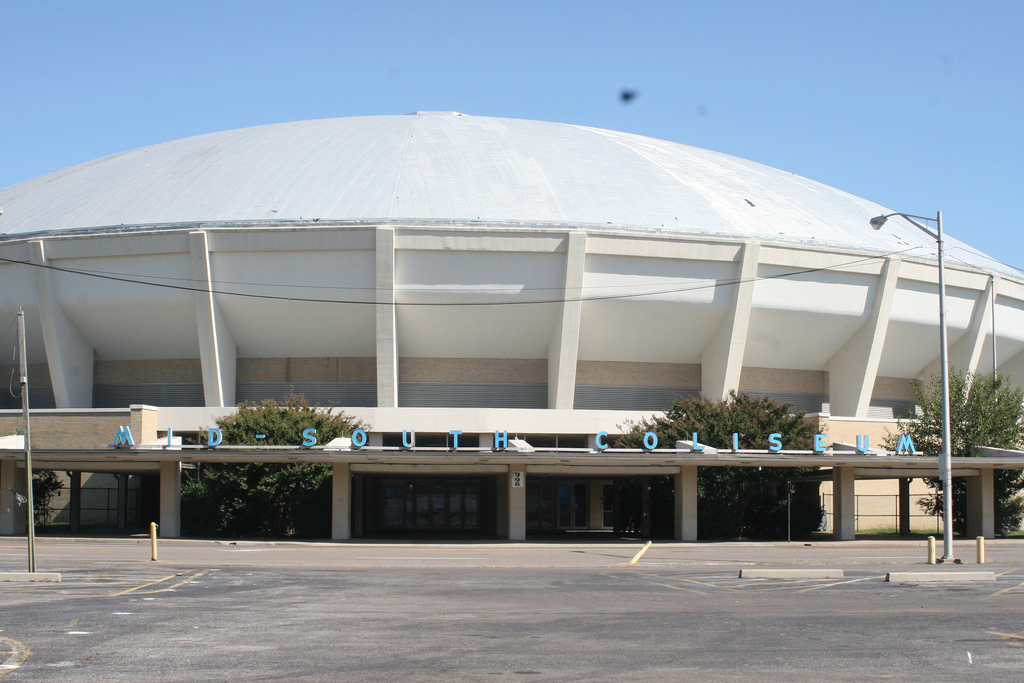
The Mid-South Coliseum (pictured 2008) in Memphis, Tennessee, served as the promotion's main venue.

The cornerstone of the CWA was the weekly Monday night shows from the Mid-South Coliseum in Memphis, where the cards regularly drew full houses. These shows were repeated in some form weekly in Louisville and Nashville (on Saturday nights). Having three major shows at all three cities, and additional shows through other towns in Kentucky, Tennessee, Arkansas, Missouri, and Northern Alabama provided significant profits into the early 1990s. These shows showcased a series of wrestlers as they made their way through the Memphis territory including Hulk Hogan, Harley Race, Terry Funk, Jack Brisco, and Ric Flair.

The biggest run of the promotion was the Jerry Lawler-Jimmy Hart feud which lasted throughout the early 1980s. Jimmy Hart's "First Family" included dozens of wrestlers who Hart brought in to face Lawler. Included in this list were The Iron Sheik, The Dream Machine, The Nightmares, Eddie Gilbert, Ken Patera, Jesse Ventura, Hulk Hogan, Bugsy McGraw, Kevin Sullivan, Bobby Eaton, "Killer Tim Brooks", and Paul Ellering. The feud ended in 1985, when Lawler won a match against Eddie Gilbert with the stipulation that Hart leaves the territory if Gilbert loses, allowing Hart to sign with the World Wrestling Federation.

The federation also aired live Saturday-morning wrestling cards from the studios of WMC-TV in Memphis, hosted by Lance Russell and Dave Brown. In the territorial era of wrestling, many local promotions had huge ratings with their wrestling shows, but none of them topped the ratings for the weekly CWA show which drew previously unheard of shares behind the strength of Lawler's local popularity.

Throughout the late 1970s, the 1980s and into the early 1990s, Jerry Lawler also engaged in feuds with Dutch Mantell, Robert Fuller, The Mongolian Stomper, Bruiser Brody, Jimmy Valiant, Austin Idol, Rocky Johnson, Tommy Rich, Randy Savage, Rick Rude, and Bill Dundee among others. These men were also on and off again partners to Lawler.

=== Andy Kaufman comes to Memphis, Tennessee ===
In the early 1980s, Andy Kaufman routinely wrestled women during his shows, proclaiming himself the “Intergender Wrestling Champion” and offering women $1000 if they could beat him. As part of this performance, Kaufman would imply that these matches were “real” and thus also imply that professional wrestling was not “real”, which countered the sacrosanct belief of fans in that era that wrestling was "real".

Kaufman even started appearing in the Mid-South Coliseum shows wrestling women in the undercard matches, and after winning Kaufman would berate the Memphis crowd and proclaim his own greatness in the sport. He even went so far as to claim that no woman could beat him and if they did – he would marry that woman. Jerry Lawler, however, was a proud defender of wrestling and angry at Kaufman for mocking the sport that made him a star, so he decided to coach one of Kaufman's opponents. Kaufman still won despite Lawler's coaching and gloated until Lawler had enough and pushed Kaufman, sending the comedian on a tirade.

The fans loved every second of it, watching the local star defend the sport against the arrogant actor from Hollywood. During the inevitable Lawler/Kaufman match, Lawler executed two Piledrivers (a move that was "banned" in Memphis) after which Kaufman was carried out of the arena on a stretcher (kayfabe). The following day several newspapers reported that Kaufman had in fact broken his neck. Several weeks later, Kaufman returned to the Mid-South Coliseum wearing a neck brace, vowing to get even with Lawler. The feud got national exposure in several newspapers after Kaufman's supposed injury, and it would get even more press after Kaufman discussed it on Saturday Night Live.

On July 27, 1982, Kaufman and Lawler were guests of David Letterman on Late Night with David Letterman. Kaufman still wore a neck brace even though the alleged injury had occurred five months before. Lawler described the neck brace as a "flea collar" and tensions rose between them until Lawler stood up and slapped Kaufman, pulled him out of a chair and pushed him off stage. Kaufman unleashed a profanity-laced tirade on Lawler, culminating with Kaufmann throwing a cup of coffee at him. Kaufman continued cursing Lawler as he (Kaufman) stormed out of the studio.

The antics of Lawler and Kaufman made the NBC network executives uneasy, believing that the hatred between the two was real and that mayhem could break out at any time. Kaufman and Lawler kept claiming that their hatred and actions were real, but they were later revealed to have been a staged "work", as the two were actually friends. The truth about it being a work was kept secret for more than 10 years after Kaufman's death until the Emmy nominated documentary A Comedy Salute to Andy Kaufman aired on NBC in 1995. In a 1997 interview with the Memphis Flyer, Lawler claimed he had improvised during their first match and the Letterman incident. Although officials at St. Francis Hospital stated that Kaufman's neck injuries were real, in his 2002 biography "It's Good to Be the King...Sometimes," Lawler detailed how they came up with the angle and kept it quiet. He also said that Kaufman's explosion on Letterman was the comedian's own idea.

=== AWA affiliation (1986–1989) ===
At the end of 1982, Jerry Lawler had seemingly won the American Wrestling Association (AWA)'s World Title from Nick Bockwinkel, but due to the match's controversial ending, the title was returned to Bockwinkel with a rematch scheduled for January 1983. On the night of the match, manager Jimmy Hart showed up in Bockwinkel's corner, face bandaged after being beaten up by Lawler in December. Near the end of the match, Jimmy Hart showed up revealing the bandaged man to be Andy Kaufman. In the confusion Bockwinkel won the match. The Lawler/Kaufman feud ended in the early part of 1983 after Lawler threw a fireball at Kaufman, ending his run with the CWA. After Kaufman left, Lawler refocused his efforts on Jimmy Hart and his First Family stable.

Lawler challenging for the World title and almost winning it was a recurring theme throughout the mid-1980s, with neither the AWA nor the NWA being willing to actually put their main title on Lawler. The NWA World title was not defended very often in the Memphis area, usually touring with companies that had more political clout in the Alliance, which meant that the CWA actually featured the AWA World champion more regularly than the group of which they were actually dues-paying members.

In 1988, plans were set in motion to actually merge the AWA and the CWA into one federation in an attempt to counter the World Wrestling Federation’s national expansion. The federation was renamed the Championship Wrestling Association in late-1987 when Lawler began co-promoting with Jarrett. Subsequently, all singles titles in the CWA (AWA Southern, CWA/AWA International and NWA Mid-America Heavyweight) were merged in order to recognize one CWA Heavyweight Champion. On May 9, 1988 in Memphis, Lawler took on the reigning AWA World Champion Curt Hennig and won the title. As the year went on the AWA/CWA alliance was expanded to include the World Class Wrestling Association out of Texas, with a title unification match set for the AWA’s first (and only) pay-per-view, AWA SuperClash III. Lawler retained the AWA World Heavyweight Championship and won the WCWA World Heavyweight Championship in controversial fashion—the match was stopped due to excessive blood loss from Kerry Von Erich—and was declared the “Unified World Champion”, cementing his claim by carrying the AWA and WCCW titles with him.

Due to controversies following the PPV, the CWA (and WCCW) broke off their relationship with the AWA, and Lawler was stripped of the AWA World title. In retaliation, Lawler kept the physical AWA World Heavyweight championship belt for not getting his payoff for SuperClash III. After the cooperative attempt with the AWA failed, Jerry Jarrett bought WCCW from the Von Erichs and unified the two promotions as the United States Wrestling Association in 1989, thus ending the era of Continental Wrestling Association.

== Notable Feuds ==
=== 1977: Jerry Lawler vs Bill Dundee ===
Through the summer until the early fall of 1977, Jerry Lawler and Bill Dundee had their first of many feuds take place. From July to September, the pair faced each other 10 times. The matches varied in types of wrestling matches and in stipulations. The types of matches varied from a one-fall contest to a Texas death match. The stipulations of these matches varied from a title vs Cadillac match, where Lawler promised to take the Southern Heavyweight Title, the main championship in the promotion, from Dundee or he would give Dundee his Cadillac. Another stipulation was that Dundee said he would shave his head if he did not win the title from Lawler. Dundee lost this match, but the week after promised to beat Lawler for the title or else he would shave his wife's head. Dundee lost this match as well, and his wife's head was shaven.

This was a notable feud in the CWA, as it did a lot of business in terms of ticket sales. According to newspaper clippings, the pair sold a total of 85,538 tickets over their 10-match feud. That is roughly an average of 8,500 people coming to watch wrestling every Monday night at the Mid-south Coliseum. In those matches, the pair sold out the Mid-south Coliseum once on August 1, where 11,300 people came to watch the two fight.

=== 1981: Jerry Lawler vs Terry Funk ===
Jimmy Hart would try to bring in wrestlers from other areas to fight Jerry Lawler. Hart did this because Lawler had broken his leg. So, Hart wanted to bring in a wrestler to break Jerry's leg. One of the wrestlers brought in was Terry Funk. Terry Funk was a National Wrestling Alliance champion from 1975 to 1977, and was considered by many to be one of the best wrestlers of his generation.

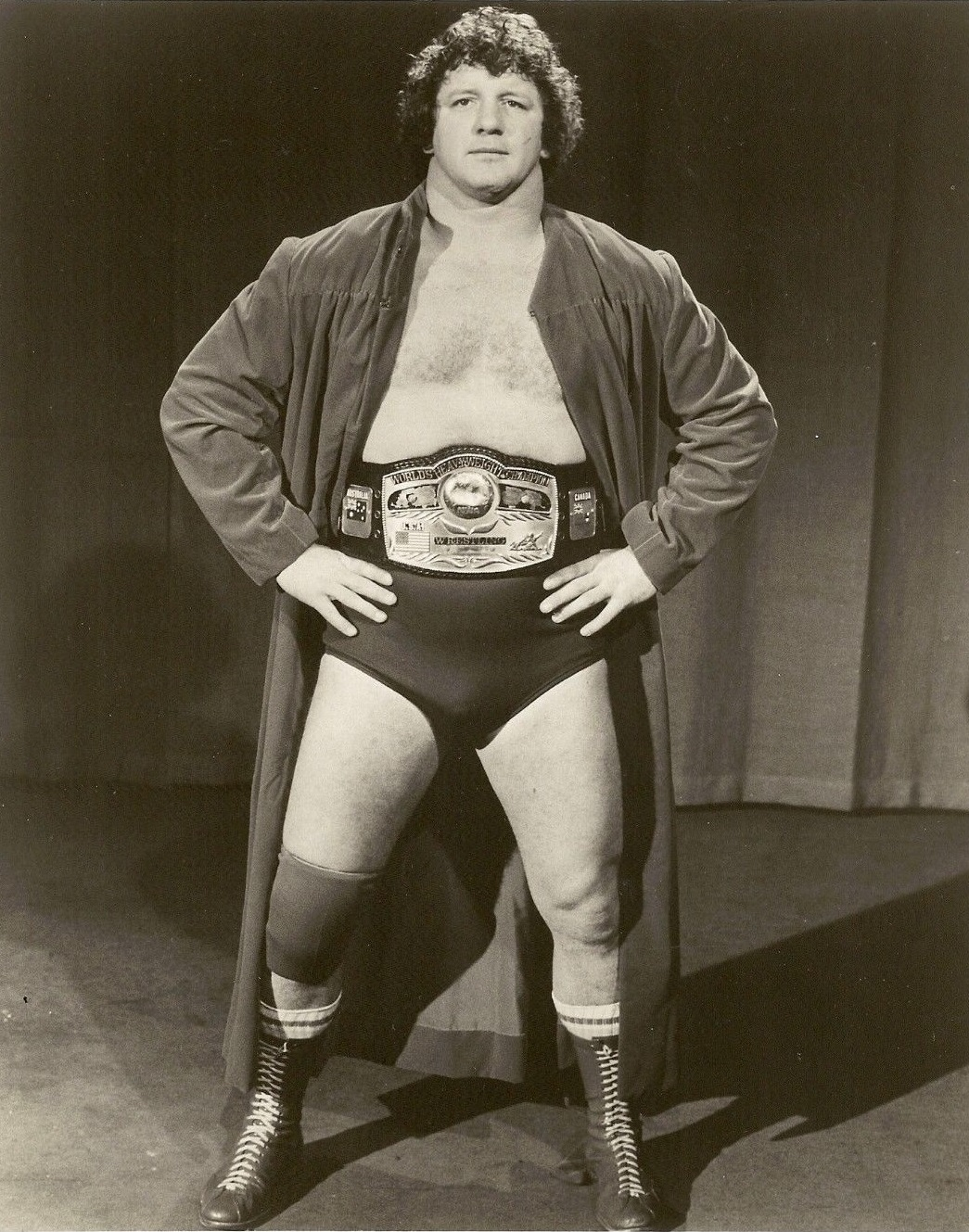
Terry Funk came to wrestle Jerry Lawler in 1981. The two faced each other twice and had two classic wrestling matches.

The first Lawler vs Funk match occurred on March 23, 1981, in the Mid-south Coliseum. This match was a No Disqualification match. Terry Funk had Jimmy Hart at ringside. The two men wrestled for about 11 minutes. Jerry Lawler won the match by count out, as Terry Funk had been incapacitated and could not return to the ring after he had his head slammed into a table by Lawler. This match is remembered as being the first time Lawler had ever dropped his strap on his wrestling singlet and not won the match immediately. Before this match, Lawler would drop his strap and immediately beat his opponent.

After this match, Funk was extremely upset that he had lost. He wanted to get his revenge on Lawler during a rematch. Funk wanted this rematch to take place in an empty arena. Funk's justification for this was that he did not trust the audience or referee, who he felt were on Lawler's side. The match took place in an empty Mid-south Coliseum on April 6, 1981, and it aired on television on April 25, 1981. The only people at this match other than Lawler and Funk was Lance Russell, a cameraman, and a photographer. The match ended after Lawler had stuck a wooden spike in Funk's eye. This was after Funk made the spike from smashing it against the ring post and tried to drive the spike into Lawler's eye.

According to Jim Cornette, former wrestling manager and wrestling historian, Funk left the CWA for a month to wrestle in Japan. Funk did return later in 1981, where he came on television and asked where Lawler was. Lawler was not present in the studio, so Terry Funk decided to take out his anger by punching a chair several times.

Terry Funk and Jerry Lawler would not fight against each other for the rest of 1981.

This was a notable feud as it marked the first time Terry Funk ever wrestled Jerry Lawler, with both men putting on two classic wrestling matches that some might say are the best in wrestling history.

== Alumni ==
=== Singles wrestlers and managers ===
Deceased individuals are indicated with a cross (†).

- Adrian Street^{†}
- Allan West
- Andy Kaufman^{†}
- Angelo Poffo^{†}
- Art Crews
- Austin Idol
- Sheik Abdullah/Iranian Assassin
- Bam Bam Bigelow^{†}
- Big Bubba the Belt Collector
- Big Daddy Ritter^{†}
- Big Red^{†}
- Bill Dundee^{†}
- Bill Irwin
- Billy Robinson^{†}
- Billy Travis^{†}
- Barry Horowitz/Jack Hart
- Bob Armstrong^{†}
- Bobby Eaton^{†}
- Brad Armstrong^{†}
- Brad Batten^{†}
- Bart Batten
- Brickhouse Brown^{†}
- Bruiser Brody^{†}
- Bubba Monroe^{†}
- Buddy Landel^{†}
- Bugsy McGraw
- Cactus Jack
- Chris Champion^{†}
- Chick Donovan
- David Schultz
- Don Bass^{†}
- Don Muraco
- Dirty White Boy
- Downtown Bruno
- Dream Machine/Troy Graham^{†}
- Duke Myers/Colossus of Death^{†}
- Dutch Mantel
- Eddie Gilbert^{†}
- Gypsy Joe^{†}
- The Great Kabuki
- Goliath^{†}
- Ed Boulder
- Hulk Hogan^{†}
- Iceman Parsons
- The Iron Sheik^{†}
- J. J. Dillon
- Jackie Fargo^{†}
- Jeff Jarrett
- Jerry Jarrett^{†}
- Jerry Lawler
- Jerry Roberts
- Jesse Barr
- Jesse Ventura
- Jerry Oske^{†}
- Jim Cornette
- Jim Neidhart^{†}
- Jimmy Golden
- Jimmy Hart
- Jimmy Valiant
- Johnny Wilhoyt
- Jos LeDuc^{†}
- Kamala^{†}
- Kendo Nagasaki^{†}
- Ken Patera
- Kevin Sullivan^{†}
- Killer Karl Krupp^{†}
- King Kong Bundy^{†}
- Lady Beast^{†}
- Lanny Poffo^{†}
- Len Denton
- Lord Humongous
- Lou Thesz^{†}
- Man Mountain Link
- Mark Starr^{†}
- Mario Milano^{†}
- Masa Fuchi
- Masked Superstar
- Master of Pain
- Maxx Payne
- Mike Sharpe^{†}
- Makhan Singh^{†}
- Mongolian Stomper^{†}
- Mr. Onita
- Nick Bockwinkel^{†}
- Ox Baker^{†}
- Pat Barrett^{†}
- Paul Ellering
- Paul E. Dangerously
- Paul Orndorff^{†}
- Pez Whatley^{†}
- Phil Hickerson
- Professor Ito^{†}
- Randy Savage^{†}
- Ric Flair
- Rick Rude^{†}
- Robert Fuller
- Rocky Johnson^{†}
- Ron Bass^{†}
- Ron Fuller
- Russian Invader
- Russian Stomper
- Scott Armstrong
- Scott Hall^{†}
- Scott Steiner
- Sherri Martel^{†}
- Shogun^{†}
- Sid Vicious^{†}
- Skip Young^{†}
- Sonny King^{†}
- Sputnik Monroe^{†}
- Stan Hansen
- Steve Armstrong
- Stunning Steve Austin
- Superstar Billy Graham^{†}
- Sweet Daddy Siki
- Terry Funk^{†}
- Terry Gordy^{†}
- Terry Taylor
- Tojo Yamamoto^{†}
- Tommy Rich
- Tom Prichard
- Tony Anthony
- J. T. Southern
- Toru Tanaka^{†}
- Tracy Smothers^{†}
- Wendell Cooley
- Uncle Elmer^{†}

=== Tag teams ===
- The Assassins
- Akio Sato and Tarzan Goto^{†}
- Badd Company (Paul Diamond and Pat Tanaka)
- Blond Bombers (Larry Latham^{†} and Wayne Farris)
- Bruise Brothers (Porkchop Cash and Dream Machine)^{†}
- Dirty White Boys
- Fabulous Freebirds (Michael Hayes and Terry Gordy^{†})
- Fabulous Ones (Steve Keirn and Stan Lane)
- Fantastics (Bobby Fulton and Tommy Rogers^{†})
- The Freedom Fighters (Rock^{†} and Flash)
- The Grapplers
- Midnight Express (Norvell Austin and Dennis Condrey) and Randy Rose
- Midnight Rockers (Shawn Michaels and Marty Jannetty)
- The Moondogs (Rex^{†} and Spot^{†})
- The M.O.D Squad
- The Nasty Boys (Brian Knobbs and Jerry Sags)
- The Nightmares (Ken Wayne and Danny Davis)
- Pretty Young Things (Koko B. Ware and Norvell Austin)
- The Road Warriors (Hawk^{†} and Animal^{†})
- Rock 'n' Roll Express (Ricky Morton and Robert Gibson)
- Rock 'n' Roll RPMs (Mike Davis^{†} and Tommy Lane)
- The Samoans (Afa Anoa'i^{†} and Sika Anoa'i^{†})
- Sheepherders (Butch Miller^{†}, Luke Williams, Jonathan Boyd^{†} and Rip Morgan)
- Stud Stable (Cactus Jack and Gary Young)
- Zambuie Express (Elijah Akeem^{†} and Kareem Muhammad^{†})

=== Announcers ===
- Dave Brown
- Lance Russell^{†}

== Championships ==
- CWA Heavyweight Championship
- CWA Tag Team Championship
- CWA Southwestern Heavyweight Championship
- CWA Super Heavyweight Championship
- CWA Tennessee Tag Team Championship
- CWA World Heavyweight Championship
- CWA World Tag Team Championship
- NWA Mid-America Heavyweight Championship
- NWA Mid-America Tag Team Championship
- NWA United States Tag Team Title (Mid-American Version)
- NWA World Six-Man Tag Team Championship
- CWA/AWA International Heavyweight Championship
- CWA/AWA International Tag Team Championship
- AWA Southern Heavyweight Championship
- AWA Southern Tag Team Championship
