= Akio Sato (wrestler) =

Japanese professional wrestler (born 1953)

Personal information
- Born: Akio Sato; February 13, 1953 (age 73) Teshikaga, Hokkaido, Japan
- Spouse: Betty Niccoli
- Children: 2

Professional wrestling career
- Ring name(s): Akio Sato; Sato; Mr. Rising Sun Shima; Shima; Shinja
- Billed height: 1.75 m (5 ft 9 in)
- Billed weight: 100 kg (220 lb)
- Billed from: Tokyo, Japan
- Debut: October 13, 1970
- Retired: 1996

Akio Sato (佐藤 昭雄, Satō Akio; born February 13, 1953) is a Japanese retired professional wrestler. He is best known for his appearances in the World Wrestling Federation as Sato, a member of the Orient Express.

== Professional wrestling career ==
=== Early career (1970–1979) ===
Akio Sato made his professional wrestling debut in 1970 in the Japan Pro Wrestling Alliance, but left that promotion in 1972 to co-found (with Giant Baba) All Japan Pro Wrestling. During the middle of the 1970s, Sato went to the US and competed in various territories. He first attracted the attention of the US fans when he competed for the NWA Central States territory run by Bob Geigel as a face teaming with people like Jerry Oates and the Viking. On February 19, 1976 Sato teamed up with promoter Bob Geigel to win the "Central States" version of the NWA World Tag-Team Titles. The team vacated the titles by July, most likely so that Geigel could focus on booking the territory. Sato and new partner Pat O’Connor were unable to win the vacant titles.

Sato next attracted the spotlight in the NWA Western States territory booked by Dick Murdoch and Blackjack Mulligan in Amarillo, Texas. Working as the heel "Mr. Sato" along with fellow Japanese wrestler Mr. Pogo the duo would win the Western States tag-team titles twice while feuding with Mulligan, Ted DiBiase, Merced Solis and Akihisa Takachiho. Sato would go on to win the title twice more, first with John Tolos and then towards the end of 1979 with Mr. Kiyomoto, a new name adopted by former foe Takachiho.

=== All Japan Pro Wrestling (1981–1989) ===
After gaining experience in the United States, Sato returned to Japan and started working for All Japan Pro Wrestling, a company he would regularly tour with throughout the 80s. On June 11, 1981 Sato and Takashi Ishikawa beat Kerry and David Von Erich for the All Asia Tag Team Championship in Tokyo, Japan. The team would hold the titles for 18 months until they were forced to vacate the titles when Sato was injured. Sato and Ishikawa won the titles once more when they defeated Animal Hamaguchi and Masanobu Kurisu for the vacant titles on April 15, 1985. The team held the gold for 3 months before being upended by Isamu Teranishi & Animal Hamaguchi.

Over the years Sato would compete on AJPW's "Budokan Hall" shows which are considered the highlight of the tours. During these tours Sato would face off against such varied competition as Nick Bockwinkel, Austin Idol and Curtis Hughes. Because Sato only toured with the AJPW and wasn't a regular, he mainly worked with the foreign talent between 1986 and 1989.

=== Central States Wrestling (1986) ===
In 1986 Sato returned to the U.S. and his old stomping grounds of the NWA Central States territory. Here he won a 14-man battle royal on March 13, 1986, to win the NWA Central States Television title, eliminating Tommy Wright last to win the title. Three months later he would lose the title to Mike George before moving to a new territory.

=== Continental Wrestling Association (1986–1988) ===
Sato found himself working in Memphis for Jerry Jarrett & Jerry Lawler’s Continental Wrestling Association. In the CWA Akio Sato and Tarzan Goto formed a formidable team that managed to win the CWA/AWA International Tag Team Championship no less than five times. The duo beat future superstar Jeff Jarrett, tag-team legends the Sheepherders. Sato’s future partner Pat Tanaka as well as future partner Paul Diamond both on separate occasions and when they joined up to form Badd Company. In 1987, he would form another team with a young Hiromichi Fuyuki.

=== Central States Wrestling (1988–1989) ===
After a brief stop in the Pacific Northwest, Sato made one last run with the Central States territory in its dying days. Sato became the last ever Central States heavyweight champion holding the belt when the promotion closed its doors in 1989. After the CWA / AWA partnership was dissolved Sato went to the AWA to compete.

=== American Wrestling Association (1989) ===
In the AWA Sato was nicknamed the "Asian Assassin" and pushed as a cold-hearted heel. On February 7, 1989 Sato participated in a very well known battle royal for the vacant AWA World Heavyweight Championship. Larry Zbyszko won the title denying Sato his biggest opportunity ever. Later on Sato would unsuccessfully challenge Greg Gagne for the AWA International Television Championship. Near the end of his time in the AWA he participated in a feud between Pat Tanaka and Paul Diamond following the breakup of Badd Company.

=== World Wrestling Federation (1990–1991, 1993, 1994–1995) ===
Sato's next move is the one that got him the most media attention as he signed with the World Wrestling Federation for the first time in his career. In early 1990 Sato along with former rival Pat Tanaka were introduced to the WWF as The Orient Express by manager Mr. Fuji. During this run, Sato introduced the Sitout Powerbomb to mainstream American wrestling for the first time. The Orient Express kicked off a prolonged feud with The Rockers that started at WrestleMania VI and continued off and on for well over a year. The Orient Express got involved in the Legion of Doom / Demolition feud because Mr. Fuji managed both teams. Demolition was being phased out and the Orient Express took on the Legion of Doom instead. The Legion of Doom / Orient Express feud was extremely onesided due to the Legion of Doom's massive size advantage.

After WrestleMania VI Tanaka and Sato only made two Pay Per View appearances while in the WWF. Firstly at SummerSlam 1990 where the team were defeated by ”Hacksaw” Jim Duggan and Nikolai Volkoff. Secondly as part of the Sgt. Slaughter led team “The Mercenaries” (that also included Boris Zhukov). Sato was pinned by Butch Miller 1:46 into the match and Tanaka was pinned by Tito Santana only moments later, 2:13 into the match.

When Akio Sato decided to focus on foreign markets for the WWF in the latter days of 1990, they decided to reunite the team known as Badd Company, only this time with Paul Diamond wearing a mask to hide the fact that he's not Asian and using the name of Kato. Sato wrestled his last WWF match in July 1991 to team with Tanaka and Kato as a one off for a 6-man tag-team match on the SummerSlam Spectacular TV special. He would also wrestle a match for WAR in 1992 and took a hiatus from wrestling for a couple of years.

In 1993, Sato made an appearance at SummerSlam as Yokozuna's flag bearer prior to his match against Lex Luger. Sato did return to the WWF in late 1994 as the white faced manager "Shinja" who advised Hakushi during his heel run with the company. His last TV appearance was on the July 24, 1995, edition of Raw, when he was piledriven by Bret Hart. When Hakushi turned face, Shinja was quietly written out of the storyline.

=== Wrestle Association R (1995–1996) ===
After WWF, Sato returned to Japan working mainly wrestling for Wrestle Association R. He retired in 1996

== Personal life ==
In 1976, Sato married Betty Niccoli, whom he met in Bob Geigel's promotion in the United States. The couple had two daughters. Sato now resides in Kansas City, Missouri.

== Championships and accomplishments ==
- All Japan Pro Wrestling
  - All Asia Tag Team Championship (2 times) – with Takashi Ishikawa
- Cauliflower Alley Club
  - Men’s Wrestling Award (2009)
- Central States Wrestling
  - NWA Central States Heavyweight Championship (1 time)
  - NWA Central States Television Championship (1 time)
  - NWA World Tag Team Championship (Central States version) (2 times) – with Bob Geigel (1 time), Ted Oates (1 time)
- Continental Wrestling Association
  - CWA/AWA International Tag Team Championship (5 times) – with Tarzan Goto
- Western States Sports
  - NWA Western States Tag Team Championship (4 times) – with Mr. Pogo (2), John Tolos (1), and Mr. Kiyomoto (1)
  - NWA Western States Heavyweight Championship (1 time)
