= The Rockers =

Professional wrestling tag team

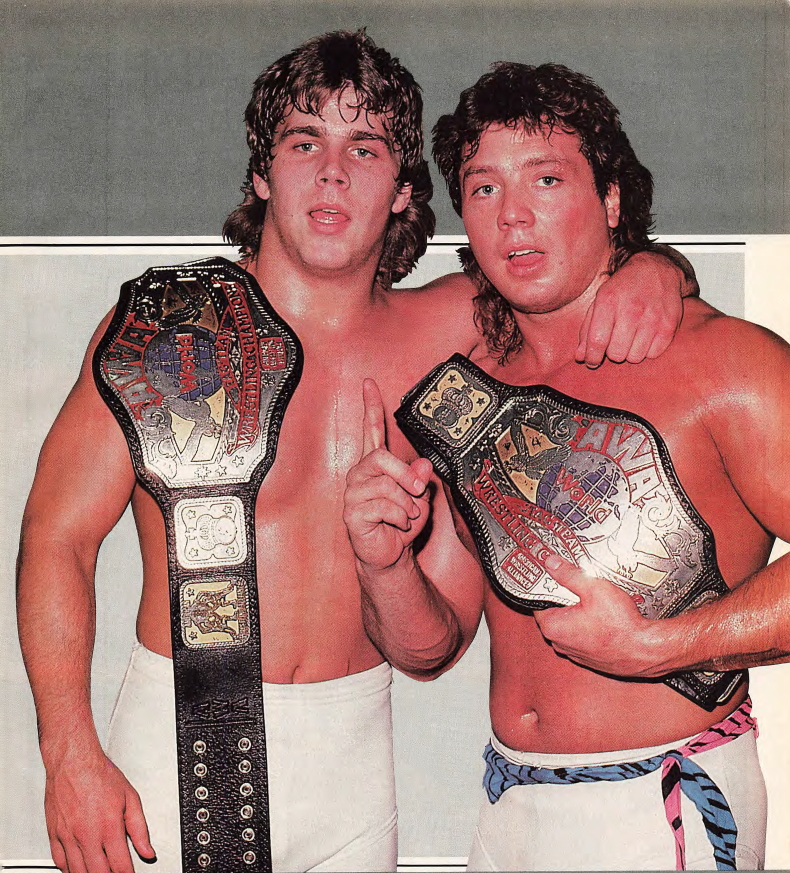
- The Rockers, Shawn Michaels (left) and Marty Jannetty, in 1987 during their time as AWA World Tag Team Champions

Tag team
- Name(s): The Rockers; The Midnight Rockers
- Members: Marty Jannetty; Shawn Michaels
- Billed heights: Shawn Michaels: 6 ft 1 in (1.85 m); Marty Jannetty: 5 ft 11 in (1.80 m)
- Combined billed weight: 451 lb (205 kg)
- Debut: May 15, 1985
- Disbanded: January 11, 1992
- Years active: 1985–1992; 2005 (one-off reunion)

The Rockers, originally the Midnight Rockers, were an American professional wrestling tag team consisting of Shawn Michaels and Marty Jannetty who teamed from 1985 to 1992. The team worked for NWA Central States Wrestling, the American Wrestling Association, Continental Wrestling Federation, Continental Wrestling Association and the World Wrestling Federation. In 1992, the team had a violent kayfabe breakup that helped propel Michaels into the singles ranks with "The Heartbreak Kid" gimmick that he used until his retirement in 2010. After the breakup Michaels and Jannetty had an on again, off again feud due to Jannetty leaving the WWF on more than one occasion. In 1996, Jannetty teamed up with Leif Cassidy (later to be known as Al Snow) to form The New Rockers, but the team never achieved much success in the WWF and ended later that same year.

In 2005, The Rockers reunited for one night, but nothing more came of it because Jannetty was released by WWE. In 2006, Jannetty was slated to return and work an extended angle, teaming with Michaels against Mr. McMahon and Shane McMahon, but only made two televised appearances before being released from his contract again. Instead, WWE reformed Michaels' other team, D-Generation X, to fill the storyline.

== History ==
=== Midnight Rockers (1985–1988) ===
==== NWA Central States Wrestling (1985) ====
Marty Jannetty and Shawn Michaels first met and struck up a friendship when they both competed for the National Wrestling Alliance's Central States Wrestling territory in Kansas City in 1985. Initially they would only travel together (along with Dave "D.J." Peterson) since Jannetty was either teaming with Tommy Rogers (not to be confused with Tommy Rogers of the Fantastics - and better known as Tommy Lane of the Rock 'n' Roll RPMs) as the Uptown Boys, or he was teaming with Central States booker ”Bulldog” Bob Brown. After the team of Jannetty and Brown broke up Michaels and Jannetty started teaming up, although they were not given a team name. On May 15, 1985 Michaels and Jannetty defeated The Batten Twins (Brad & Bart) to win the NWA Central States Tag Team Championship. Their first title reign was short-lived as the Batten Twins regained the title only a week later on May 22, 1985. Shortly after the team lost the CSW tag team title, Michaels left Kansas City and the NWA, and returned to his home state of Texas to work for Texas All-Star Wrestling. In TASW Shawn began teaming with Paul Diamond as ”American Force” and the team of Jannetty and Michaels seemed like it was never meant to be a permanent thing.

==== American Wrestling Association (1986–1987) ====
In early 1986, both Jannetty and Michaels were signed by the American Wrestling Association (AWA) as they needed young talent to replace the wrestlers that had switched to the World Wrestling Federation (WWF) as it was expanding towards becoming a national company. The two were paired up by the AWA bookers; Greg Gagne (son of the owner and one of the bookers) suggested the name ”The Country Rockers”, another idea for a name was the "U.S. Express" (as told by Marty during an interview on AWA television that aired in 1986) not keen on the idea the two of them came up with the name The Midnight Rockers inspired by Judas Priest’s ”Living after Midnight”. AWA owner Verne Gagne did not seem to understand the idea, (in fact he is quoted as wondering if fans might confuse the name with rocking chairs) but let the team go ahead and use the name.

The two started wearing identical outfits and develop the ”Fun loving pretty boy” gimmick they would be known for throughout their time together. After wrestling on the lower end of the card to get the fans familiar with the team the Midnight Rockers soon moved onto a feud with the team of Doug Somers and Buddy Rose who at the time were one of the top teams in the promotion. Their initial outing with Somers and Rose at the WrestleRock stadium show on April 20, 1986 did not go well for Jannetty and Michaels who lost in front of 22,000 fans. When Somers and Rose beat Scott Hall and Curt Hennig for the AWA World Tag Team Championship the Midnight Rockers suddenly found themselves chasing the tag team champions of the world. The Midnight Rockers teamed up with Curt Hennig to defeat Somer, Rose and Alexis Smirnoff at ”Battle by the Bay” on June 28, 1986 to prove that they were indeed capable of beating the champions. The Midnight Rockers would repeatedly challenge Somers throughout the rest of 1986 but never quite be able to get the win when the title was on the line. Finally near the end of that year, Jannetty and Michaels defeated the champions in a ”non-title” Steel cage match on December 25, 1986 on the AWA's ”Brawl in St. Paul” show. A month later on January 27, 1987, at the Met Center, in Bloomington, MN, the Midnight Rockers defeated Rose and Somers for the AWA Tag Team title. Jannetty and Michaels realized that the AWA was a promotion in decline (it would shut down completely by 1990), and decided their best bet was to work for the WWF. The Midnight Rockers got an offer from Vince McMahon while they were AWA World Tag Team Champions, and signed with the WWF. This resulted in a quick title loss to the unproven duo of Boris Zhukov and Soldat Ustinov on May 25, 1987.

==== Various promotions (1987–1988) ====
Five days after dropping the AWA Tag Team Championship, the team made their first WWF appearance at a house show in St. Paul, Minnesota, where they challenged the then WWF World Tag Team Champions The Hart Foundation for a title match. Four days later the Midnight Rockers wrestled at their first and only TV taping for the show WWF Wrestling Challenge, defeating the team of Jose Estrada, Sr. and Jimmy Jack Funk. After just a few weeks with the company, which included some house show matches against The Shadows., Michaels and Janetty were fired because of excessive partying and not enough focusing on their in ring work.

After being fired by the WWF, they went down to Continental Wrestling around Alabama and Pensacola, Florida. According to the Heartbreak and Triumph DVD, Michaels was unhappy there. When Bob Armstrong took over the booking, they gave them two weeks notice that they were no longer needed and he was bringing in another tag team.

After the way they had left the AWA Michaels and Jannetty could not just return like nothing had happened, instead the Midnight Rockers started working for the AWA affiliated Championship Wrestling Association (CWA) in Memphis, Tennessee. The team had made a couple of appearances in the CWA in the past as part of their working agreement with the AWA but now they were in Memphis full-time. Shortly after arriving in the territory, Michaels and Janetty turned heel signing with manager Mark Guleen. Their first feud in Memphis was against a recently formed team known as The Nasty Boys (Jerry Sags and Brian Knobs) whom they faced in several brutal matches all over the CWA territory. After The Nasty Boys, The Rockers got involved in a feud with “The Nightmares” (Danny Davis and Ken Wayne). Their villainous personas were that of self-obsessed, glory seeking ”superstars”, the same persona Michaels would later adopt as ”The Hearbreak Kid”. Their feud with the RPMs saw the Midnight Rockers defeat Lane and Davis to win the AWA Southern Tag Team Championship on October 26, 1987. Jannetty and Michaels lost then regained the Southern Tag Team title as the Midnight Rockers / RPMs feud raged on.

With their success in Memphis, the AWA started to book them as well, having the Midnight Rockers split their time between Memphis and the AWA territory – in Memphis the Midnight Rockers were heels but in the AWA they were faces (good guys), something which was possible before the advent of national television deals and easy internet access. On December 27, 1987 The Midnight Rockers defeated The Midnight Express (Dennis Condrey and Randy Rose) for the AWA World Tag Team title. Since they had won the AWA World Tag Team titles, Jannetty and Michaels were forced to vacate the AWA Southern Tag Team titles in January 1988. While in the CWA, they had a brief feud with The Rock 'n' Roll Express over the AWA World Tag Team titles. After a short while in the AWA Jannetty and Michaels began asking for more money and a guaranteed contract from owner Verne Gagne. When this request was denied the Midnight Rockers quit the AWA without having found another promotion for which to work. Before they left the promotion, they lost the AWA Tag Team Championship on March 19 to Badd Company (Pat Tanaka and Paul Diamond).

=== The Rockers (1988–1992) ===
==== World Wrestling Federation (1988–1991) ====
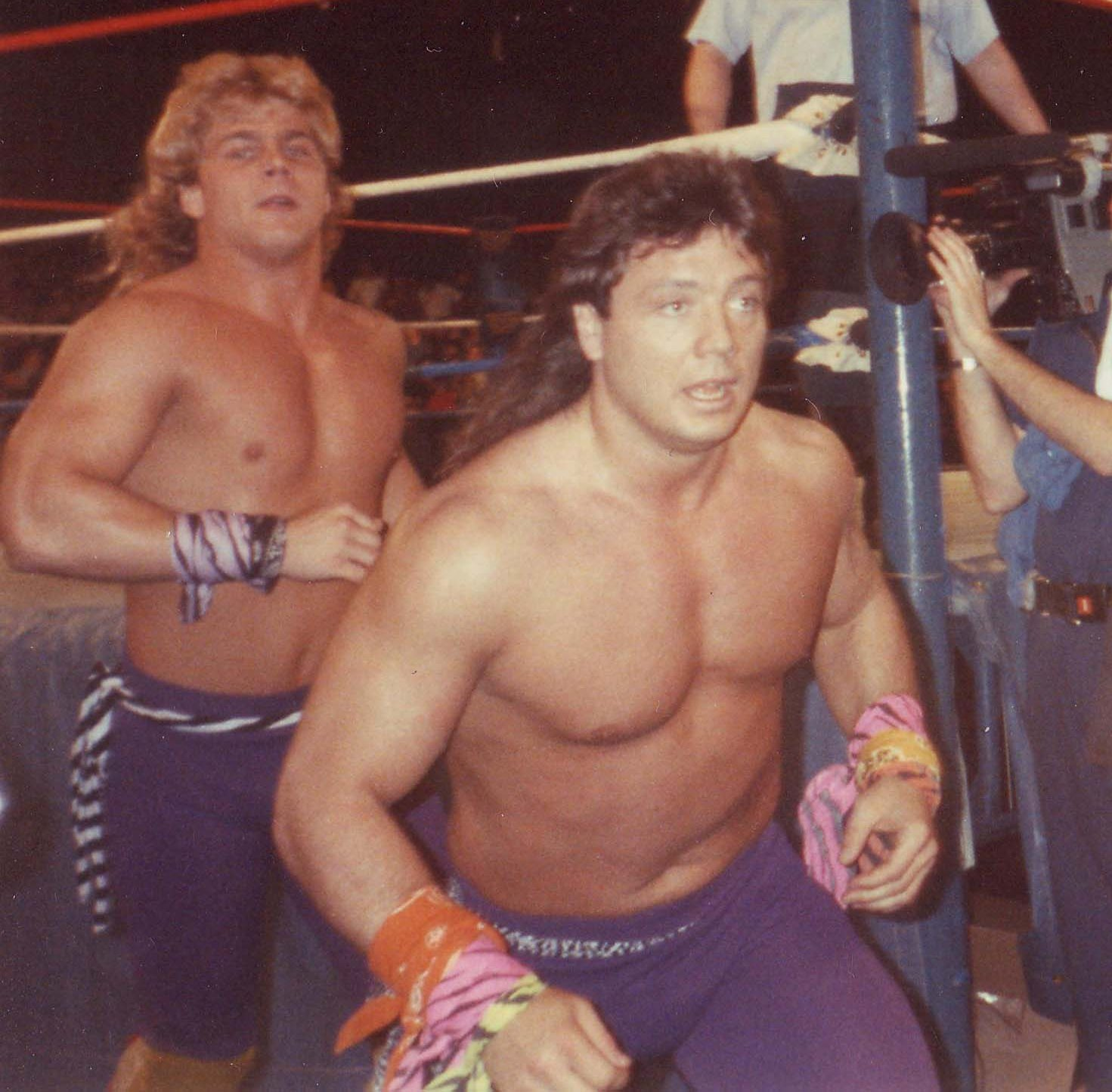
Shawn Michaels (left) and Marty Jannetty (right), March 1989

Shortly after leaving the AWA, Jannetty and Michaels were contacted by WWF owner Vince McMahon informing them that he was willing to bring them back if they were able to be more professional this time around. By the end of May the team was working for the WWF under the shortened name The Rockers. They officially made their television debut on the June 18, 1988 edition of WWF Superstars of Wrestling (taped June 1, 1988) in a squash match defeating Iron Mike Sharpe and the Intruder. The Rockers made their pay-per-view (PPV) debut at the 1988 Survivor Series as part of the 10 team tag match. They eliminated The Bolsheviks from the match before being eliminated by a double-disqualification in a brawl with the Brain Busters. The brawl between The Rockers and The Brain Busters led to a match taped for WWF Superstars of Wrestling where both teams were disqualified once again, this time before the match could really start. This led to a series of house show matches between the two teams, a series of matches that drew rave reviews from the fans. One match in particular on January 23, 1989 at Madison Square Garden was rated as one of the 50 greatest matches in the PWI 10th anniversary issue. The Brain Busters narrowly defeated The Rockers, as Anderson held down Marty Jannetty's leg as Blanchard pinned him. The feud continued to rage on as they clashed at Saturday Night's Main Event XX in a match that saw both teams counted out for brawling on the floor.

They competed against The Twin Towers, Akeem and Big Boss Man, at WrestleMania V. According to Michaels' autobiography, he was nursing a severe hangover in the hours before this match. In spring 1989, The Rockers started a storyline with The Fabulous Rougeau Brothers that kicked off with an underhanded attack on Michaels during a match. The Rougeaus assaulted Michaels with manager Jimmy Hart’s megaphone and drew blood. This storyline put The Rockers' issues with The Brain Busters on the back burners while The Rockers and the Rougeaus fought. The issue between The Rockers and Rougeaus was the storyline reason for introducing the “Iron Man match” to the WWF. Despite wrestling 5 Iron Man matches against each other none of the matches were ever televised or released on a commercial tape. On August 28, 1989, the Rockers/Rougeau feud made it to PPV as the Rougeaus teamed with Rick Martel to defeat The Rockers and Tito Santana at SummerSlam.

In late 1989, The Rockers and The Brain Busters resumed their feud after The Brain Busters lost the WWF Tag Team Championship to Demolition. On November 23, The Rockers faced Arn Anderson as part of the 4-on-4 elimination matches at Survivor Series. Prior to the match, Tully Blanchard had failed a drug test and was fired, forcing manager Bobby Heenan to wrestle in his place. The Rockers and The Brain Busters had one last match at Saturday Night's Main Event XXIV where they defeated The Brain Busters 2 falls to 1. After the match, Bobby Heenan fired the team in a backstage segment to explain why the team disappeared from the WWF.

In December 1989, The Rockers feuded with The Powers of Pain until February 1990.

At the Royal Rumble in January 1990, both men competed in the Royal Rumble match. However, neither Michaels nor Janetty was victorious in their attempt, being eliminated by the Ultimate Warrior and Ted DiBiase, respectively.

In April 1990, The Rockers faced new competition in the form of Pat Tanaka and Akio Sato, the newly signed team known as The Orient Express. The two teams kicked off a prolonged feud that started at WrestleMania VI and continued off and on for well over a year. When Sato decided to leave the American wrestling scene in December 1990, the WWF decided to team Tanaka up with his former partner Paul Diamond under a mask. Tanaka and Diamond had previously teamed as Badd Company and won the AWA Tag Team Championship from The Rockers. The Rockers and The Orient Express had a high profile, high flying match at the Royal Rumble that to this day, is considered one of the best matches in Royal Rumble history.

==== Tag team title controversy (1990) ====
By current WWE records, The Rockers never officially held the WWF Tag Team Championship, but on October 30, 1990, Jannetty and Michaels did actually defeat the reigning champions The Hart Foundation in a two out of three falls match in Fort Wayne, Indiana to seemingly win the titles. The WWE (WWF) has never officially recognized The Rockers' champion status. During the match, the top rope broke by accident making the match a disjointed affair that would require serious clean up before it could be shown on TV. The Rockers defended the WWF Tag Team title against Power and Glory (Paul Roma and Hercules) on November 3, 1990. Shortly after November 3, it was decided to not air the title change and that the title would revert to the Hart Foundation. In his book, Michaels claims that the Hart Foundation had politicked to keep the title. Michaels claim is contradicted by other claims that the WWF had actually fired Jim Neidhart forcing the title change, but after the match, the two sides came to an agreement, and Neidhart was brought back. The Rockers were never officially credited with a title win, but footage from the match was shown prior to Jannetty's WWF return in 1995. The match can be seen in its entirety on the DVD The Shawn Michaels Story: Heartbreak & Triumph. Because it never aired, the match was not clipped and thus is shown in full with no commentary; the only edit being after the second fall when a ring crew arrived to reattach the broken rope.

==== Break up and beyond (1991-1992) ====
After teaming together since 1985, The Rockers split up in December 1991 after backstage disputes. The exact nature of the dispute has not been confirmed by the WWF other than it was a monetary issue that led to Jannetty quitting the WWF on behalf of both Rockers. According to Michaels's book, Jannetty had claimed that World Championship Wrestling were willing to give them a very high guaranteed contract but when Michaels inquired about it, it turned out to be an exaggeration. Jannetty disputes this saying that Michaels was the driving force suggesting to quit the WWF, but had Jannetty do the phone call to ask for a release from their contract. When Vince McMahon actually agreed to let them go Michaels appeared shocked according to him, and later went to McMahon unbeknownst to him to explain this was Jannetty's idea only and that he had no intention of leaving the WWF himself. After cooler heads prevailed it was decided that The Rockers should split with Michaels turning heel to feud with Jannetty. Jannetty was not happy about the team splitting, while Michaels could not wait to work as a singles wrestler.

On screen there was no mention of what went on backstage, instead Michaels and Jannetty started to show signs of dissension. During a singles match between Michaels and Ric Flair, Jannetty rolled Shawn into the ring to get pinned. Michaels took this as Jannetty costing him the match instead of helping out (though this was a storyline). At the 1991 Survivor Series Jannetty caused Michaels to be eliminated by accidentally slamming one of the Nasty Boys into him after which The Rockers argued. After the buildup, The Rockers wrestled one last match on television, a title shot at The Legion of Doom which The Rockers lost after which Jannetty and Michaels argued over who was to blame. After Survivor Series, they continued to feud with the Nasty Boys in a series of house shows throughout November and into December. Their last match together was a loss to the Beverly Brothers on December 30, 1991, at a house show in Green Bay, Wisconsin.

A DVD extra on Heartbreak And Triumph, and in Michaels's autobiography of the same name, titled The Rockers "Fight" reveals that they got into a legit fight in May 1991 that was instigated by Roddy Piper. The incident according to Michaels happened as the boys were intoxicated, Piper, also drunk, started talking about how Michaels would be an even greater competitor in the business, that he would even be the future of the business. Piper stated, that "Michaels had had a great future in the business and that Michaels had all this talent". Jannetty, believing that to be an insult to him challenged Michaels to a fight to which Michaels declined. Jannetty, however, would not take no for an answer and attacked Michaels which started the fight. Piper pulled the two apart, and Michaels passed out right after, and wouldn't come to until the next day. The story, told by Jannetty, reveals that police were called to the scene and arrested Jannetty. As they were arresting him though, Randy Savage stepped in and prevented him from going to jail by telling the police that it was all part of a storyline even though in reality he did not know the cause of the fight in the first place. Michaels almost quit the WWF over the incident, and Jannetty believes that this incident was one of the factors in the WWF's decision to break up The Rockers.

The final split came on Brutus Beefcake’s "Barbershop" (taped on December 2, 1991, and aired on January 11, 1992) where Beefcake interviewed The Rockers about their recent problems. After seemingly working out their problems, Michaels suddenly superkicked Jannetty, and then threw Jannetty through the plate glass window of the Barbershop. Michaels also proceeded to rip a magazine centerfold picture of the group in half, signifying the separation. The turn had the desired effect of making Michaels a hated heel especially since the WWF agreed to let Jannetty "blade" (make himself bleed) after being thrown through the window something which was not very prevalent in 1991. It also prevented Jannetty from entering the Royal Rumble in 1992.

=== Michaels vs. Jannetty (1992-1993) ===
Michaels and Jannetty were supposed to feud following the breakup, but Jannetty was suspended by the WWF, due to an incident outside a Tampa night club that occurred on January 25, 1992. He was arrested and put under house arrest for months with charges of resisting arrest with force, cocaine possession and possession of drug paraphernalia, forcing the feud to be abandoned at least temporarily. While Jannetty was away, Michaels began developing his “Heartbreak Kid” heel persona including getting Sherri Martel as his manager. Michaels also won the WWF Intercontinental Championship from The British Bulldog. On the October 31, 1992 (taped October 12, 1992 in Saskatoon, Saskatchewan) edition of WWF Superstars, Michaels was in the ring posing before a match, admiring himself in a mirror that Sherri brought to the ring. To everyone's surprise, Jannetty came down through the crowd and entered the ring. Jannetty attacked Michaels, grabbed the mirror and tried to hit Michaels with it. But Michaels pulled Sherri in front of himself so that she got hit with the mirror instead. This led to Sherri being hospitalized from the glass shards (only in storyline terms) when Sherri returned from her “recovery” she turned on Michaels and actually backed Jannetty in his unsuccessful attempt to take the Intercontinental title away from Michaels at the 1993 Royal Rumble. After the loss, Jannetty was fired by the WWF for supposedly being drunk or hungover during the match however, Mr. Perfect reported that it was actually due to a lack of sleep and Jannetty was brought back.

During an episode of Monday Night Raw on May 17, 1993, Jannetty returned to the WWF during an impromptu challenge. Jannetty defeated Michaels to win the title (with the help of Mr. Perfect). Three weeks later Jannetty lost the title back to Michaels in an untelevised house show thanks to the interference of Michaels’ new bodyguard Diesel. After losing the title the Michaels/Jannetty feud petered out with Michaels focusing on other title challengers while Jannetty wrestled on the mid-card until leaving the WWF in the Spring of 1994.

=== The New Rockers (1996) ===
The New Rockers

Tag team
- Members: Marty Jannetty; Leif Cassidy
- Billed heights: Marty Jannetty: 5 ft 11 in (1.80 m); Leif Cassidy: 6 ft 2 in (1.88 m)
- Combined billed weight: 468 lb (212 kg)
- Debut: February 20, 1996
- Disbanded: December 16, 1996
- Years active: 1996

In September 1995, Jannetty returned to the WWF and initially worked in the singles division. In February 1996, Jannetty was introduced to Al Snow and told that he would be his new partner as the New Rockers. The initial plan was a return to The Rockers' gimmick, but the decision was made to make the team "silly" comedy heels according to Marty Jannetty in the book The Pro Wrestling Hall of Fame: The Tag Teams. They were told that the idea was for them to be like watching the 1960s television show The Monkees, complete with Snow being named "Leif Cassidy" as a play off 1970s idols David Cassidy and Leif Garrett. Going against his better judgment, Jannetty agreed to it, if nothing else than to help Snow out, who was trying to find a bankable gimmick. Jannetty was later informed that former partner Shawn Michaels had been the one to suggest the change in the gimmick. Jannetty fought Michaels twice who was WWF Champion at the time. Once on May 11 in Kuwait and the other on Raw July 1 episode. The team was never seriously pushed in the WWF making only a couple of low card PPV appearances before Jannetty decided to leave the WWF in December 1996. Cassidy later changed gimmicks in 1997 and went to ECW using the Head gimmick. He returned to WWF in 1998 with the Head gimmick.

=== Reunions (2005, 2006, 2007) ===
In the years following Jannetty's 1996 departure, Michaels became a born-again Christian in real life. This helped the two to patch up their above mentioned off-screen differences once and for all when Michaels shared his faith and aided Jannetty in becoming a Christian. On the SmackDown! shown on March 10, 2005 (taped two days earlier) Kurt Angle announced that as part of his preparation for his WrestleMania 21 match against Michaels' he would face Michaels old partner Jannetty on the following SmackDown. The following Monday, March 14, 2005, Jannetty made a surprise appearance on WWE Raw and, for one night, The Rockers reunited to take on La Résistance (Sylvain Grenier and Rob Conway). Jannetty got the win with the "Rocker Dropper" after Michaels hit ”Sweet Chin Music” on Grenier. Three days later on SmackDown Angle had promised to make Jannetty ”tap out”, just like he was going to make Michaels tap out at WrestleMania 21. Angle made good on his promise and forced Jannetty to submit to his ankle lock submission hold, but only after a nearly twenty-minute match and an impressive showing for Jannetty which saw him nearly pin the Olympic champion. After two good showings on Raw and SmackDown to convince WWE that he was still a very talented performer, they signed him to a contract. However, due to a domestic incident, Jannetty was arrested and thus unable to meet the commitments of his WWE contract. This led to his release on July 6, 2005.

On the February 20, 2006 edition of Raw, Michaels was pitted against four of the five members of the Spirit Squad in their in-ring debut. After he had connected with "Sweet Chin Music", Michaels was attacked by all five members until an unknown man came storming in to the ring to defend Michaels. During the melee, it was revealed that it was Jannetty coming to defend his former tag team partner. Later on Raw, Mr. McMahon came out to mention that he would offer Jannetty a full-time contract. However, McMahon added a stipulation: Jannetty had to join McMahon's "Kiss My Ass Club" the following week on Raw. On Raw Jannetty refused to indulge McMahon. McMahon instead offered Jannetty the possibility of breaking Chris Masters' signature submission hold, the Master Lock. Jannetty appeared to almost break the hold, but McMahon (who was officiating) delivered a low blow, and Jannetty was never able to break it, only being released when Michaels ran in to save him. Shortly after Michaels had saved Jannetty, Shane McMahon ran in the ring with a steel chair and knocked out Michaels. The former Rockers were supposed to continue a program with the McMahons, but Jannetty was absent from the next edition of Raw which meant that they had to rewrite the angle leaving Jannetty out of it.

In December 2007, Michaels began feuding with Mr. Kennedy. Kennedy was set to face off against Jannetty at the Raw 15th Anniversary Spectacular. Kennedy won the match, but continued beating down Jannetty. Michaels then came out to save his former partner from a beating. Before Michaels had a chance to get in the first punch, Kennedy quickly recognized Michaels and started an assault on him until Triple H, Shawn's DX partner, came out and Kennedy escaped.

=== The Newest Rockers (2022) ===
On October 21, 2022 Leif Cassidy as Al Snow formed The Newest Rockers with youngster Kal Herro winning the OFE Tag Team titles.

== Championships and accomplishments ==
- American Wrestling Association
  - AWA World Tag Team Championship (2 times)
- Central States Wrestling
  - NWA Central States Tag Team Championship (1 time)
- Continental Wrestling Association
  - AWA Southern Tag Team Championship (2 times)
- Pro Wrestling Illustrated
  - Ranked No. 33 of the top 100 tag teams of the PWI Years in 2003
- Pro Wrestling This Week
  - Wrestler of the Week (February 8–14, 1987)
- Wrestling Observer Newsletter
  - Tag Team of the Year (1989)
