= Pretty Young Things =

Professional wrestling tag team

Tag team
- Members: Koko Ware; Norvell Austin
- Name(s): The Pretty Young Things; The PYT Express
- Debut: 1983
- Disbanded: 1985

The Pretty Young Things was a professional wrestling tag team, composed of Koko Ware and Norvell Austin.

== History ==
During a tag-team tournament in 1983, the masked Stagger Lee teamed up with fellow face Norvell Austin to take on “Fargo’s Fabulous Ones" (Tommy Rich and "Hot Stuff" Eddie Gilbert). During the course of the match Stagger Lee’s mask was removed to reveal the man beneath it, prompting a heel turn for Ware. Austin and Ware became a regular tag team dubbed "The Pretty Young Things" or "The PYT Express". The two men soon began wearing red leather jackets, and each had a single white glove on, in homage to pop star Michael Jackson and his 1983 hit single P.Y.T. (Pretty Young Thing), as well as to further enhance their “pretty boy” image.

The team managed to defeat the team of Elijah Akeem and Kareem Mohammad for the AWA Southern Tag Team title in February 1984, although they only hung on to the gold for a little under two weeks before Akeem and Mohammad regained the title. The PYT Express remained in Memphis for a period of time after this before moving on to other promotions such as Mid-South Wrestling, World Class Championship Wrestling in Texas and Championship Wrestling from Florida. On February 26, 1985 Austin and Ware defeated Jay and Mark Youngblood to win the NWA Florida United States Tag Team Championship. On March 5, 1985 the team re-lost the title to the Youngbloods. After dropping the gold in Florida, the Pretty Young Things returned to the federation that first put them together, the Continental Wrestling Association. There, they won the AWA Southern Tag Team title twice, both times from The Fabulous Ones (Steve Keirn and Stan Lane) as they feuded with the top face team of the promotion.

== Championships and accomplishments ==
- Championship Wrestling from Florida

- NWA United States Tag Team Championship (Florida version) (1 time)

- Continental Wrestling Association

- AWA Southern Tag Team Championship (3 times)
