= Masa Saito =

Japanese professional wrestler (1942–2018)

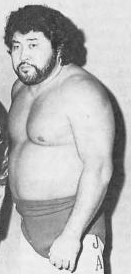
- Saito, c. 1983

Personal information
- Born: Masanori Saito; August 7, 1942 Tokyo, Japan
- Died: July 14, 2018 (aged 75) Saitama Prefecture, Japan
- Cause of death: Parkinson's disease

Professional wrestling career
- Ring name(s): Assassin #3; Masa Saito; Mr. Saito; The Unknown Soldier
- Billed height: 1.8 m (5 ft 11 in)
- Billed weight: 120 kg (265 lb)
- Trained by: Hiro Matsuda; Toyonobori
- Debut: June 3, 1965
- Retired: February 14, 1999

Masanori Saito (斎藤 昌典, Saitō Masanori; August 7, 1942 – July 14, 2018) was a Japanese professional wrestler, better known by the ring name Mr. Saito or Masa Saito (マサ斎藤). He wrestled for 33 years around the world. He had success as a singles wrestler, winning the AWA World Heavyweight Championship in 1990, and as a tag team wrestler with multiple partners in various National Wrestling Alliance (NWA) territories.

Saito joined the World Wrestling Federation (WWF) in 1981, where he teamed with Mr. Fuji to hold the World Tag Team Championship twice and would claim the nickname "Chopstick Charlie". In Japan, he wrestled for both top leagues, All Japan Pro Wrestling (AJPW) and New Japan Pro-Wrestling (NJPW). He wrestled Antonio Inoki across Ganryujima island for over two hours in 1987.

Saito was imprisoned in the United States for two years in the mid-1980s for physically assaulting police officers in Waukesha, Wisconsin, following an accusation of vandalism against his friend Ken Patera.

== Amateur wrestling career ==
Saito competed in freestyle wrestling for Japan in the 1964 Summer Olympics, placing seventh.

== Professional wrestling career ==
=== Early career (1965–1968) ===
Recruited to the professional game along with fellow Olympian Koji Sugiyama, Saito began his pro wrestling career in 1965 and quickly established himself in both Japan and the United States. Nicknamed "Mr. Torture" for his punishing and sadistic style, Saito held numerous titles while wrestling in North America and Japan.

=== National Wrestling Alliance (1968–1981) ===
On July 13, 1968, Saito won his first title, teaming with Kenji Shibuya to win the San Francisco version of the World Tag Team Championship. The following year, he defeated Dale Lewis to win the NWA Florida Heavyweight Championship. After losing the title to Jack Brisco on February 10, 1970, he continued to team with Shibuya in the Los Angeles-based NWA Hollywood Wrestling, winning the NWA Americas Tag Team Championship three times in 1971 and 1972. While wrestling in Los Angeles, he also won the NWA Beat the Champ Television Championship twice in 1972.

Saito's next championship came in Vancouver, British Columbia, where he teamed with Austin Britton to win the Vancouver version of the Canadian Tag Team Championship. They held the belts for almost four months before dropping them to Ormand Malumba and Guy Mitchell on March 3, 1975. Saito regained the championship later in the year, however, teaming with Dale Lewis.

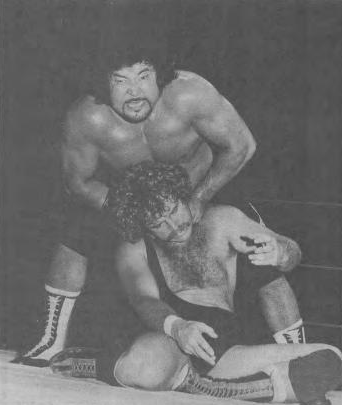
Masa Saito (top) wrestling Mike Graham (bottom), c. 1980

Saito next wrestled in NWA Florida, where he teamed with Ivan Koloff to defeat Rocky Johnson and Pedro Morales for the NWA Florida Tag Team Championship in 1977. After losing the belts, Saito and Koloff won them twice more. Their final loss, on January 25, 1978, was to Jack and Jerry Brisco. Saito regained the title, however, teaming with Mr. Sato to defeat the Brisco Brothers. They lost the belts back to the Brisco Brothers three months later but succeeded in regaining them from Mike Graham and Steve Keirn later in the year. While wrestling in Florida, Saito also teamed with Sato to win the NWA Florida United States Tag Team Championship on two occasions in 1978 and 1979. In 1979, he also won the Japan version of the North American Tag Team Championship, teaming with Hiro Matsuda to win the belts on April 5.

Wrestling in the United States again in 1981, Saito won the Alabama Heavyweight Championship twice, defeating Bob Armstrong and Ray Candy. That year, he was also involved in a controversy regarding the Florida version of the North American Tag Team Championship. The Assassins were stripped of the title when it was discovered that Saito was wrestling under a mask as a third member of the team.

=== World Wrestling Federation (1981–1982) ===
Later in the year, Saito signed with the World Wrestling Federation. He formed a tag team with Mr. Fuji, which was managed by Captain Lou Albano. They began a feud with tag champions Tony Garea and Rick Martel, whom they defeated on edition of October 17, 1981, of Championship Wrestling to win their first WWF Tag Team Championship, though it was Fuji's fourth individual reign. They began feuding with The Strongbows (Chief Jay and Jules) in the fall of 1981. This culminated in a title match on June 28, 1982, at Madison Square Garden (MSG) where Strongbows won the titles. On the July 13, 1982, edition of Championship Wrestling, they defeated Strongbows in a two out of three falls match for Fuji's fifth and Saito's second WWF Tag Team Championship. The feud of these two teams ended after Fuji and Saito lost the titles to Strongbows on the October 30, 1982, edition of Championship Wrestling.

=== American Wrestling Association (1983–1990) ===
In June 1983, Saito went to Minneapolis and began wrestling for American Wrestling Association. While there, he formed a tag team with Jesse Ventura called the Far East-West Connection. After Ventura left for the WWF, Saito was aligned with Nick Bockwinkel and Bobby Heenan, before Heenan left for the WWF as well. He would remain with them until May 1985 when he began serving his sentence. After being released for good behavior, Saito returned to the AWA in 1986 on Christmas night, aligning himself with Larry Zbyszko and Super Ninja. He remained with the AWA until April 1987. He briefly returned alone in February 1988, but brought Riki Choshu with him three months later. It would not be until November 1989 that Saito would come back and would bring Koji Kitao over with him to train. In February 1990, at 48 years of age, he won the AWA World Heavyweight Championship, defeating Larry Zbyszko at Super Fight in Tokyo Dome. His victory made headlines on newspapers, but was eclipsed by the Buster Douglas victory over Mike Tyson the next night at the same arena. He would hold onto the title until April when Zbyszko regained the title at SuperClash IV.

=== All Japan Pro Wrestling (1985) ===
Saito wrestled two tours for All Japan Pro Wrestling as part of Japan Pro Wrestling in January and May 1985.

=== Return to NJPW (1987–1997) ===
In 1987, Saito returned to New Japan Pro-Wrestling, where he became involved in a feud with Antonio Inoki. On June 12, Saito faced Inoki in the finals of the IWGP League 1987 to determine the first ever IWGP Heavyweight Champion, which Inoki won. To settle the feud, the two competed in an Island Death match on October 4, 1987. They were placed on Ganryujima Island and wrestled a match that lasted two hours and spread across the island. Ultimately, Inoki was victorious, defeating Saito by technical knockout. The following year, after leaving All Japan Pro Wrestling to return to New Japan Pro-Wrestling, Saito won his first IWGP Tag Team Championship while teaming with Riki Choshu. He followed this with a second victory the following year, this time with Shinya Hashimoto.

=== World Championship Wrestling (1990–1991, 1995–1996) ===
Saito had a couple short stints in World Championship Wrestling (WCW). His first came in 1990, which saw him team with The Great Muta for the Pat O'Connor Memorial Tag Team Tournament at Starrcade '90: Collision Course, which they lost to The Steiner Brothers in the finals.

It wouldn't be until five years later that Saito briefly returned, which included an appearance at Starrcade '95. Wrestling as part of a series of matches between New Japan Pro-Wrestling and World Championship Wrestling, Saito lost his match to WCW representative Johnny B. Badd by disqualification. His last match for the company aired on May 18, 1996, on WCW Pro, teaming with Masahiro Chono, wrestling Harlem Heat to a double disqualification.

=== Last Match NJPW (1999) ===
On February 14, 1999, Saito wrestled his last match, which was a loss to Scott Norton.

=== Retirement ===
Upon retiring in 1999, he stayed in NJPW as a commentator, until leaving the company in January 2003 and joined Fighting World of Japan Pro Wrestling until its collapse a year later. In 2005, after accepting an invitation from Kensuke Sasaki, Saito worked with the Diamond Ring promotion as a supervisor and manager/advisor to the promotion's younger talent. Diamond Ring ran its last show in February 2014. After Diamond Ring, Saito moved back to his home in Tokyo.

== Professional wrestling style and persona ==
Saito's style is considered "very physical style that included lots of suplexes [...]" and "brought hard physicality with his clotheslines". One of these suplexes is known as the Saito Suplex. During his time in prison, he created a hold, which was named "Kangokugatame", translated as Prison Hold or Prison Lock. During his career, Saito played the stereotypical salt-throwing Japanese heel, a role usually performed by Hawaiians in the 60s.

== Personal life and death ==
In 2000, Saito was diagnosed with Parkinson's disease. He died from complications of the disease on 14 July 2018 at the age of 76.

At the time of his death, Saito had been training to be a torchbearer for the upcoming Summer Olympics in Tokyo in 2020.

=== Arrest ===
According to police, on April 6, 1984, Ken Patera was refused service at a McDonald's restaurant after the restaurant had closed, and threw a boulder through the restaurant's window in retaliation. The responding officers testified that later, when they arrived at Saito and Patera's hotel room to investigate someone matching Patera's description in connection with the criminal damage report, Saito was uncooperative and both wrestlers assaulted the officers, taking turns beating them until other officers arrived to subdue them. As a result of the incident, in June 1985, Saito and Patera were convicted of battery of a police officer and sentenced to serve two years in prison.

On November 16, 2012, Patera was interviewed on KFAN radio based out of Minneapolis, MN. In describing the incident, he stated that he went to the McDonald's around midnight to get a burger, but found it closed. The lights were on because they were shooting a commercial, so not only Patera but another customer (who he described as a young adult) had arrived, thinking that they were open for business. The young adult threw a rock through the window, but Patera was blamed. Saito was not present at the restaurant.

== Championships and accomplishments ==
- American Wrestling Association
  - AWA World Heavyweight Championship (1 time)
- Big Time Wrestling (San Francisco)
  - NWA World Tag Team Championship (San Francisco version) (2 times) – with Kenji Shibuya
- Championship Wrestling from Florida
  - NWA Florida Heavyweight Championship (2 times)
  - NWA Florida Tag Team Championship (5 times) – with Ivan Koloff (3) and Mr. Sato (2)
  - NWA United States Tag Team Championship (Florida version) (2 times) – with Mr. Sato
- George Tragos/Lou Thesz Professional Wrestling Hall of Fame
  - Class of 2008
- New Japan Pro-Wrestling
  - IWGP Tag Team Championship (2 times) – with Riki Choshu (1) and Shinya Hashimoto (1)
  - IWGP Tag Team Title Challenger Decision League (1989) - with Shinya Hashimoto
  - NWA North American Tag Team Championship (Los Angeles/Japan version) (1 time) – with Hiro Matsuda
- NWA All-Star Wrestling
  - NWA Canadian Tag Team Championship (Vancouver version) (2 times) – with Gene Kiniski (1) and Dale Lewis (1)
- NWA Hollywood Wrestling
  - NWA Americas Tag Team Championship (3 times) – with Kenji Shibuya
  - NWA "Beat the Champ" Television Championship (2 times)
- Pro Wrestling Illustrated
  - PWI ranked him #89 of the top 500 singles wrestlers of the "PWI Years" in 2003
- Southeastern Championship Wrestling
  - NWA Alabama Heavyweight Championship (2 times)
- Tokyo Sports
  - Service Award (1999)
  - Special Grand Prize (1987)
- World Wrestling Federation
  - WWF World Tag Team Championship (2 times) – with Mr. Fuji
- Wrestling Observer Newsletter
  - Best Technical Wrestler (1984)
  - Wrestling Observer Newsletter Hall of Fame (Class of 2009)
