= NWA North American Tag Team Championship (Florida version) =

Professional wrestling championship

NWA North American Tag Team Championship (Florida)
- The championship belt

Details
- Promotion: Championship Wrestling from Florida
- Date established: March 21, 1981
- Date retired: September 1982
Statistics
- First champion(s): Barry Windham and Mike Graham
- Most reigns: The Assassins and Jack Brisco and Jerry Brisco (2 reigns) (as individual) Dory Funk, Jr. (2 reigns)

The NWA North American Tag Team Championship (Florida version) was a professional wrestling tag team championship briefly used and defended in the National Wrestling Alliance affiliated Championship Wrestling from Florida between March 1981 and April 1982. The title was used as a replacement for the Florida version of the NWA United States Tag Team Championship, which was defended off and on in the promotion throughout the 60s, 70s and 80s. The Florida version of the North American Tag Team Championship was the fourth NWA affiliated promotion to create its own version of the title. Although its name would suggest otherwise, it was only defended within the Florida territory and not on any national basis.

== Title history ==
Key
No.	Overall reign number
Reign	Reign number for the specific team—reign numbers for the individuals are in parentheses, if different
Days	Number of days held

No.	Champion	Championship change			Reign statistics		Notes	Ref.
No.	Champion	Date	Event	Location	Reign	Days	Notes	Ref.
1	Barry Windham and Mike Graham	March 24, 1981	CWF Show	Tampa, Florida	1	29	Defeated The Assassins in tournament final to become first champions.	
2	The Assassins (Assassin #1 and Assassin #2)	April 22, 1981	CWF Show	N/A	1	20		
3	Mike Graham (2) and Steve Keirn	May 12, 1981	CWF Show	Tampa, Florida	1	(Note: The exact date that the championship was vacated is uncertain, which means that the reign lasted between 1 and 19 days.)		
—	Vacated	May 1981	—	—	—	—	Vacated the titles shortly after winning them.	
4	The Assassins (Assassin #1 and Assassin #2)	June 16, 1981	CWF Show	Tampa, Florida	2	(Note: The exact date the championship was vacated is uncertain, which means that the reign lasted between 46 and 76 days.)	Defeated Cocoa Samoa and Tommy Gilbert in tournament final.	
—	Vacated	August 1981	—	—	—	—	Mr. Saito is found to be working as Assassin #3 illegally.	
	The Brisco Brothers (Jack Brisco and Jerry Brisco)	November 1981	CWF Show	N/A	1	(Note: The exact date that the Brisco Brothers won the championship is uncertain, which means that it lasted between 40 and 69 days.)	Defeated Assassin #1 and Bobby Jaggers (subbing for Ox Baker) in eight-team tournament final.	
6	The Funk Brothers (Dory Funk, Jr. and Terry Funk)	January 9, 1982	CWF Show	Tampa, Florida	1	7		
7	The Brisco Brothers (Jack Brisco and Jerry Brisco)	January 16, 1982	CWF Show	St. Petersburg, Florida	2	50		
8	Dory Funk Jr. (2) and David Von Erich	March 7, 1982	CWF Show	Orlando, Florida	1	35		
9	Bruce Reed and Sweet Brown Sugar	April 11, 1982	CWF Show	Orlando, Florida	1	(Note: The exact date that the championship was abandoned is uncertain, which means that the reign lasted between 143 and 172 days.)		
—	Deactivated	September 1982	—	—	—	—	Championship was replaced with the NWA Florida Global Tag Team Championship.	
