= Norvell Austin =

American professional wrestler (born 1951)

Personal information
- Born: March 9, 1951 (age 75) Pensacola, Florida, U.S.

Professional wrestling career
- Ring name(s): Black Panther; The Junkyard Dog; Norvell Austin; The Shadow
- Billed height: 5 ft 10 in (178 cm)
- Billed weight: 224 lb (102 kg)
- Billed from: Byhalia, Mississippi
- Debut: 1971
- Retired: September 25, 2004

Norvell Austin (born March 9, 1951) is an American retired professional wrestler. Austin worked for most of his career in the Southern United States, most often in tag team competition. Norvell Austin is most famous for teaming with Sputnik Monroe in one of the first "mixed races" villainous teams seen in the south. Austin was also part of the original Midnight Express from 1981 to 1983. Later on he would team with Koko B. Ware as one half of the "Pretty Young Things".

== Professional wrestling career ==
=== Early career (1971–1981) ===
Austin began his professional wrestling career in 1971 the Florida/Alabama area. At the time, African American wrestlers in the south were utilized in very specific ways. They were mainly restricted to wrestling other African Americans and if they were to wrestle white opponents, they were always fan favorites who could not cheat or use underhanded means to beat their white opponents. These restrictions meant that Austin worked as a face initially and mainly in singles competition since no all African American tag teams were used at that time.

In late 1971 Austin along with a man who had been fighting for equality in wrestling for a long time, Sputnik Monroe formed a tag team, what was unique for the team at the time was that they were heels (bad guys) a first for the Southern United States wrestling promotions. Norvell would dye a blond streak in his hair to match Monroe's and even hinted that Austin could be Sputnik Monroe's son. Together the team won the NWA Mid-America version of the NWA Southern Tag Team Championship from the team of Bearcat Brown and Len Rossi in May 1972. They’d lose the titles to Karl and Kurt Von Brauner about a month later. Winning the tag team gold was far from the only achievement Austin and Monroe had while in Mid-America, in what was a reversal of an infamous angle that saw "The Interns" paint Bearcat Brown with white paint the heel duo dropped black paint on white wrestler Robert Fuller. This led Sputnik Monroe to state that "Black is Beautiful" to which Norvell Austin replied "White is wonderful", something that would become a catch phrase for the team. Austin and Monroe also saw success outside the Alabama area where NWA Mid-America operated, mainly in Florida where they worked for Championship Wrestling from Florida under promoter Eddie Graham. In Florida the team won the NWA Florida Tag Team Championship on October 10, 1972, by beating Robert Fuller and Jimmy Golden. Austin and Monroe held the titles until November 16, 1972, when Jack and Jerry Brisco beat them for the titles.

On October 1, 1973, Austin won his first singles title when he became the NWA Mississippi Heavyweight Champion, something which helped cement Austin as one of the pioneers in breaking down the racial barriers in the south. In 1975 Austin teamed up with Rocket Monroe (Sputnik's storyline brother) to briefly hold the Gulf Coast Championship Wrestling version of the NWA United States tag team titles. After working together for three years which saw the team even tour Japan Norvell Austin decided that it was time to work as a singles wrestler ending his association with Sputnik Monroe. From 1975 Austin kept working for NWA Mid-America both the southern part of the territory that was promoted by Nick Gulas and the northern part promoted by Jerry Jarrett that would later split off and become Continental Wrestling Association (CWA). Despite wanting to wrestle more as a singles wrestler Austin was usually booked in the tag team division, teaming with for instance Butch Malone to win the NWA Tennessee Tag Team Championship. After the title loss Austin was given an opportunity to feud with his former partner Butch Malone for a brief period of time. The feud with Malone did not convince the bookers to give Austin more of a singles push but instead put him back in the tag team division with a variety of partners such as Bill Dundee, Pat Barrett and Jimmy Golden all of whom he held tag team championships in NWA Mid-America or Gulf Coast Championship Wrestling (renamed Southeast Championship Wrestling (SECW) in 1978).

=== The Midnight Express (1981–1983) ===
In 1980 a new team was formed in Southeast Championship Wrestling when Dennis Condrey's previous partner Don Carson retired. Condrey teamed up with Randy Rose and won the NWA Southeast Tag Team Championship shortly after they started teaming up. The team started a storyline feud with Austin who wrestled as "The Junkyard Dog" before the more famous version of the Junkyard Dog used the name in wrestling. Austin recruited various partners such as Paul Orndorff, who were successful in capturing the Southeast tag team gold briefly. In an attempt to throw Rose and Condrey off Austin would adopt the masked persona of "The Shadow" and together with Brad Armstrong defeat the team for the Southeast tag team gold on May 4, 1981, and held onto the gold until July 27, 1981, where Condrey and Rose regained the titles. After the title loss Austin turned on Armstrong and joined up with Condrey and Rose to form a stable (group) known as The Midnight Express. In the book The Pro Wrestling Hall of Fame: The Tag Teams Condrey explains that the name did not stem from the movie Midnight Express (although later versions of the Midnight Express would use the film's theme as their own theme music) but from the fact that they all dressed in black, drove black cars and were out partying past midnight. Together the three men would win the AWA Southern Tag Team title in the CWA and invoke a rule that would later be referred to as the Freebird Rule, which allowed any two of the three men to defend the titles on a given night so that their opponents never knew what combination to expect. The Midnight Express would lose the AWA Southern tag team title to Bobby Eaton and Sweet Brown Sugar before returning to SECW in the spring of 1982.

In Southeastern Championship Wrestling, the Midnight Express would win the NWA Southeastern Tag Team Title a further six times. The Express won and lost the titles to such teams as Jimmy Golden and Robert Fuller, Mongolian Stomper and Stomper Jr., "Dizzy" Ed Hogan and Ken Lucas and Brad and Scott Armstrong.

=== Pretty Young Things (1983–1985) ===
The Midnight Express disbanded in late 1983 when Norvell Austin went back to the CWA in Memphis and Dennis Condrey moved on to Mid-South Wrestling. In Memphis Austin became a part of Jimmy Hart's stable of wrestlers known as the First Family.

During a tag-team tournament in 1984 Norvell Austin was teamed up with the masked Stagger Lee on "Fargo's Fabulous Ones" (Tommy Rich and Eddie Gilbert). During the course of the match Stagger Lee's mask was removed to reveal the man beneath it (Koko B. Ware), something which prompted a heel turn for Ware. Austin and Ware became a regular tag team dubbed the "Pretty Young Things" or "PYT Express". The two men soon began wearing red leather jackets and each had a single white glove on in an obvious imitation of Michael Jackson to further enhance their "pretty boy" image, and even used Jackson's song of the same name as their entrance music.

The team managed to defeat the colossal team of Elijah Akeem and Kareem Mohammad for the AWA Southern Tag Team titles in February 1984 although they would only hang onto the gold for a little under 2 weeks before Akeem and Mohammad regained the titles. the PYT Express remained in Memphis for a period of time after this before moving on to other promotions such as World Class Championship Wrestling in Texas and later on Championship Wrestling from Florida. On February 26, 1985, Austin and Ware defeat Jay and Mark Youngblood to win the NWA Florida United States Tag Team Championship. Two weeks later on March 5, 1985, the team lost the titles to the Youngbloods.

After dropping the gold in Florida the Pretty Young Things returned to the federation that first put them together, the Continental Wrestling Association where they won the AWA Southern Tag Team titles twice, both times from The Fabulous Ones (Steve Keirn and Stan Lane) as they feuded with the top face team of the promotion.

=== Late career (1985–1986, 2004) ===
By the end of the summer of 1985 the Pretty Young Things went their separate ways with Austin returning to his old stomping grounds in Southeast Championship Wrestling. In SECW Austin was teamed up with fellow African American Brickhouse Brown to form a team called "Soul Patrol". On September 23, 1985, the Soul Patrol defeated the Nightmares to win the NWA Southeast Tag Team Championship, which was Norvell Austin's tenth reign with that particular title. The Soul Patrol lost the championship to the Nightmares only a few weeks later on. After the Soul Patrol broke up Austin became involved in a heated storyline with the at the time reigning NWA Southeastern Heavyweight Champion "Exotic" Adrian Street. On January 6, 1986, Austin defeated Street for the title and held on to it until Street with the help of his valet Miss Linda regained the title on February 17, 1986.

In the late 1980s Norvell Austin retired from professional wrestling, but has made a few special "Legends" appearances in the last couple of years, last time on September 25, 2004, where he teamed with Randy Rose to defeat the team of Texas Roughrider and Luke Goldberg in Continental Wrestling.

== Championships and accomplishments ==
- Championship Wrestling from Florida
  - NWA Florida Tag Team Championship (1 time) – with Sputnik Monroe
  - NWA United States Tag Team Championship (Florida version) (1 time) – with Koko B. Ware
- Gulf Coast Championship Wrestling / Southeastern Championship Wrestling / Continental Championship Wrestling
  - NWA Mississippi Heavyweight Championship (1 time)
  - NWA Southeastern Heavyweight Championship (Northern Division) (1 time)
  - NWA Southeastern Tag Team Championship (10 times) – with Jimmy Golden (1), Paul Orndorff (1), Brad Armstrong (1), Dennis Condrey (3), Randy Rose (3), Brickhouse Brown (1)
  - NWA Southeastern United States Junior Heavyweight Championship (2 times)
  - NWA Tennessee Tag Team Championship (1 time) – with Butch Malone
  - NWA United States Tag Team Championship (Gulf Coast-Version) (1 time) – with Rocket Monroe
- NWA Mid-America / Continental Wrestling Association
  - AWA Southern Tag Team Championship (6 times) – with Bill Dundee (1), Dennis Condrey (1), Randy Rose (1), and Koko B. Ware (3)
  - NWA Southern Tag Team Championship (Mid-America version) (2 times) – with Sputnik Monroe (1) and Pat Barrett (1)
