= Leroy Brown (wrestler) =

American wrestler (1950–1988)

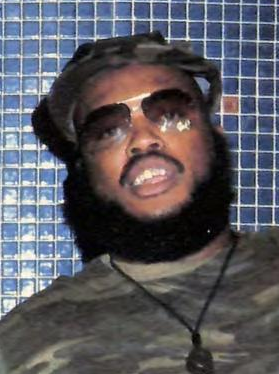

Personal information
- Born: Roland C. Daniels; November 30, 1950 Savannah, Georgia, U.S.
- Died: September 6, 1988 (aged 37) Savannah, Georgia, U.S.
- Cause of death: Stroke / heart attack

Professional wrestling career
- Ring name(s): Elijah Akeem; Georgia Sweets; Muhammad Jabbar; Leroy Brown
- Billed height: 6 ft 2 in (188 cm)
- Billed weight: 310 lb (141 kg)
- Debut: 1977
- Retired: January 1, 1987

Roland C. Daniels (November 30, 1950 – September 6, 1988), better known by his ring name "Bad Bad" Leroy Brown, was an American professional wrestler. He took his ring name from the Jim Croce song "Bad, Bad Leroy Brown", which also became his theme song for many of his in-ring appearances. He later used the ring name Elijah Akeem upon adopting a more militaristic black Muslim character, teaming with Kareem Muhammad as the "Muslim Connection" or the "Zambuie Express".

Brown started out his career working as a face in the south, portraying a simple, honest man who always backed up his friends. He later portrayed a heel, acting like an arrogant, rich, self-obsessed character. During his career, he won a number of singles championships such as the NWA Southern Heavyweight Championship and the NWA Mid-Atlantic Television Championship, as well as a number of tag team championships, teaming with Muhammad to win the NWA Florida Global Tag Team Championship, NWA United States Tag Team Championship and AWA Southern Tag Team Championships.

== Professional wrestling career ==
=== Early career (1977–1983) ===
Daniels made his professional wrestling debut in 1977, adopting the ring name "Bad, Bad" Leroy Brown, based on the Jim Croce song of the same name. He took part in a tournament for the vacant NWA Southern Heavyweight Championship in September, his first major title opportunity, but was eliminated in the early rounds. After this, he traveled to Texas to work for Fritz Von Erich's NWA Big Time Wrestling. On March 31, 1978, Brown and Killer Tim Brooks defeated José Lothario and Al Madril to win the NWA Texas Tag Team Championship, Brown's first championship. The reign only lasted a week before Brown and Brooks lost the championship to David and Kevin Von Erich.

By 1979, Leroy Brown began working in San Francisco for NWA Hollywood Wrestling. Brown teamed up with Allen Coage and together they defeated Los Guerreros (Héctor Guerrero and Mando Guerrero) to win the NWA Americas Tag Team Championship. They would later lose the belts to Mando Guerrero and Carlos Mata. Working for NWA Hollywood also allowed Brown to travel to Japan, touring with New Japan Pro-Wrestling (NJPW). During the tour, he challenged Seiji Sakaguchi for the NWF North American Heavyweight Championship in July, but Sakaguchi retained the title by disqualification. In his book Animal, George Steele describes Brown's problems in Japan, including how during a match, a Japanese wrestler was trying to break a bottle over Brown's head but had not prepared it properly; it took several hard blows to break the bottle. The next day, several Japanese wrestlers watched the tape of the match over and over again, laughing at Brown's misfortune and pain. Back in San Francisco, Brown defeated Chavo Guerrero to win the WWA Americas Heavyweight Championship, holding it for 50 days before losing it to Al Madril.

Later in 1979, Brown returned to the eastern coast, competing for Championship Wrestling from Florida. He became involved in a feud with then NWA Florida Heavyweight Champion Manny Fernandez, facing him on several occasions in January 1980. After that, he moved onto a feud with Sweet Brown Sugar, whom he defeated to win the NWA Southern Heavyweight Championship. He lost the title to Dusty Rhodes on February 16 in Jacksonville, Florida. Brown eventually worked for Bill Watts' Mid-South Wrestling, teaming with Ernie Ladd for most of his time in Mid-South. The two defeated Junkyard Dog and Terry Orndorff to win the Mid-South Tag Team Championship, and later traded the championship with Junkyard Dog and other partners such as Killer Karl Kox and Dick Murdoch.

In 1981, Mid-Atlantic Championship Wrestling (MACW) brought Leroy Brown as a regular worker, presenting him as a blue collar hero, wearing coveralls and a hard hat to the ring. He showed up to help the faces take on Sgt. Slaughter and his army, backing them up whenever Slaughter's army tried to use the numbers to their advantage. Brown and various partners such as Ricky Steamboat and Sweet Ebony Diamond challenged The Minnesota Wrecking Crew (Gene and Ole Anderson) for the Mid-Atlantic version of the NWA World Tag Team Championship. In 1982, Brown was involved in a feud with then NWA World Heavyweight Champion Ric Flair. The storyline started with an arm wrestling challenge laid out by Flair. Brown won the challenge, leading to Flair demanding a rematch which Brown also won. During a third arm wrestling challenge, Brown was attacked by Big John Studd, beating him up prior to Brown wrestling Flair for the championship at the Omni Coliseum, Georgia Championship Wrestling's venue for major shows. Despite the attack, Brown won the match by disqualification as Flair intentionally disqualified himself to keep the championship. Subsequently, Flair frustrated Brown at every turn, using underhanded tactics and placing a bounty on Brown to keep him away from the title. During the feud, Flair would try to tempt Brown with fancy suits and the "jet set" lifestyle, hoping to tempt Brown to side with him. After losing to Flair in June, Brown accepted the offer, turning heel as he became enamored with fine clothes, jewelry and fast cars. Brown took Oliver Humperdink as his manager, becoming part of the heel group "House of Humperdink". On November 27, Brown won a 20-man battle royal to win the vacant NWA Mid-Atlantic Television Championship, holding it for 28 days until losing the championship on December 25 to Mike Rotunda. Following the loss, Brown left JCP and traveled to Florida.

=== Zambuie Express / Muslim Connection (1983–1985) ===
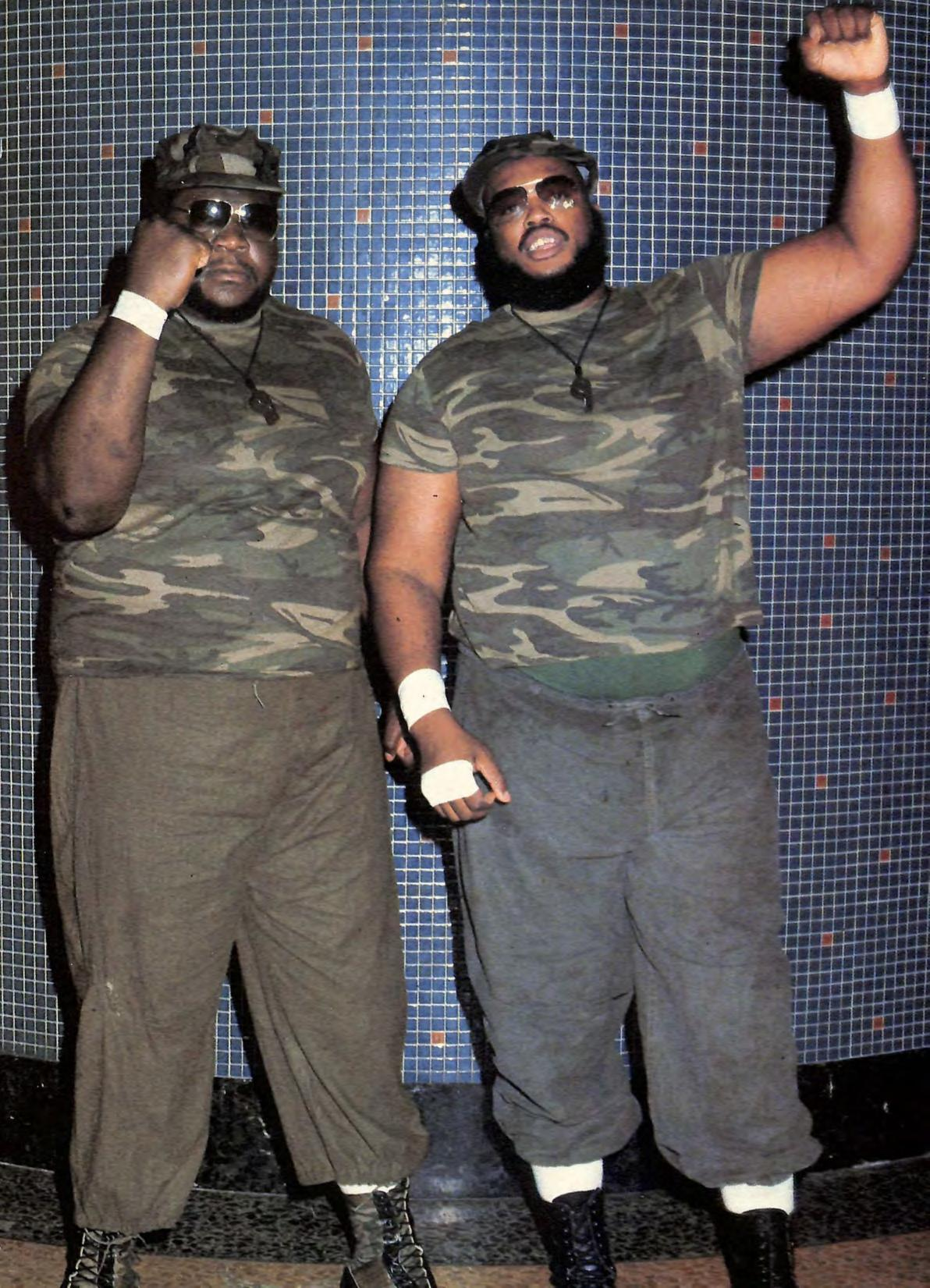
The Zambuie Express, Brown (right) and Ray Candy (left, circa 1983

In 1983, Florida bookers came up with a storyline where Daniels announced that he had changed his name to "Eljiah Akeem", referring to it as his Muslim name. He subsequently became the bodyguard for the hated heel "Exotic" Adrian Street. A few months later, Brown was paired with Ray Candy, who took the name "Kareem Muhammad", forming the "Zambuie Express" which was at times billed as "The Muslim Connection" in some promotions. The duo wore camouflage pants and shirts to the ring, adopting militaristic Muslim in ring characters, based to some extent on the Black Panther Party. The two toured mainly in the southern parts of the United States, where their racially charged characters made them very hated. The team was often managed by Humperdink and was part of the "House of Humperdink". On July 31, the duo defeated Mike Graham and Scott McGhee to win the NWA Florida Global Tag Team Championship. The duo held the championship until September of that year, when it was replaced by the Florida version of the NWA United States Tag Team Championship. The Zambuie Express were declared the United States Champions, with the storyline being that they won a tournament. Two months later on November 5, the Zambuie Express lost the championship to the team of Dusty Rhodes and Blackjack Mulligan.

The team soon traveled to Memphis to compete for the Continental Wrestling Association (CWA), where they were immediately pitted against the top face team of the territory, The Fabulous Ones (Stan Lane and Steve Keirn). On January 24, 1984, the Zambuie Express were awarded the AWA Southern Tag Team Championship when the Fabulous Ones failed to show up for a match, but the titles were declared vacant instead of giving them to Akeem and Muhammad. The CWA held a tournament for the vacant championship, a tournament won by the Zambuie Express as they defeated the Pretty Young Things (Koko B. Ware and Norvell Austin) in the finals. The Pretty Young Things won the championship only a week later, defeating the Zambuie Express on CWA's weekly show at the Mid-South Coliseum. Eight days later, the Zambuie Express regained the championship. The duo held on to the belts until March 12, when they lost to Jerry Lawler and Jos LeDuc. The team toured with New Japan Pro-Wrestling in the spring and ended up working for Jim Crockett Promotions by the summer. The Zambuie Express sided with Paul Jones and became part of Paul Jones' Army as they fought against Jimmy Valiant and Valiant's friends. At Starrcade on November 22, they lost to Buzz Tyler and The Masked Assassin #1. This was one of the last matches the Zambuie Express worked together, splitting up a short time later.

=== Late career (1985–1987) ===
In 1985, Daniels resumed working as Leroy Brown, travelling to Japan to work a tour for NJPW, often teaming with "Bad News" Allen Coage. The following year, Brown began working for the Universal Wrestling Federation (UWF), formerly Mid-South Wrestling. Brown teamed up with "Wild" Bill Irwin and won the UWF Tag Team Championship from the team of John Tatum and Jack Victory on November 9, 1986. The team successfully defended the championship against Gary Young and Joe Savoldi as part of the UWF Superdome Extravaganza, held at the New Orleans' Superdome on November 27. The team held the title for 48 days in total, until they were defeated by Terry Taylor and Jim Duggan on December 27. Brown wrestled his final match on January 1, 1987, competing in a UWF Bunkhouse Battle Royal.

== Death ==
Daniels died on September 6, 1988, as the result of a stroke and subsequent heart attack caused by severe cirrhosis at a hospital in Savannah, Georgia at the age of 37.

== Other Leroy Browns ==
Daniels was not the only wrestler to use "Leroy Brown" as their ring name. Polynesian wrestler Leroy Tuifao also used the name "Leroy Brown" as he wrestled primarily in Hawaii. British wrestler Oliver Biney, better known as Rampage Brown, also used the name "Leroy Brown" for a period of time. The Junkyard Dog originally wrestled under the name "Leroy Rochester", which has led some sources to mistakenly list Roland Daniels' birth name as "Leroy Rochester".

== Championships and accomplishments ==
- Championship Wrestling from Florida
  - NWA Florida Global Tag Team Championship (1 time) – with Kareem Muhammad
  - NWA Southern Heavyweight Championship (Florida version) (1 time)
  - NWA United States Tag Team Championship (Florida version) (1 time) – with Kareem Muhammad
- Continental Wrestling Association
  - AWA Southern Tag Team Championship (2 times) – with Kareem Muhammad
- Mid-Atlantic Championship Wrestling
  - NWA Mid-Atlantic Television Championship (1 time)
- Mid-South Wrestling
  - Mid-South Tag Team Championship (2 times) – with Ernie Ladd
  - UWF Tag Team Championship (1 time) – with Bill Irwin
- NWA Big Time Wrestling
  - NWA Texas Tag Team Championship (1 time) – with Killer Tim Brooks
- NWA Hollywood Wrestling
  - NWA Americas Heavyweight Championship (1 time)
  - NWA Americas Tag Team Championship (1 time) – with Allen Coage
- Pro Wrestling Illustrated
  - PWI ranked him # 484 of the 500 best singles wrestlers of the PWI Years in 2003.

== See also ==
- List of premature professional wrestling deaths
