= Koko B. Ware =

American professional wrestler

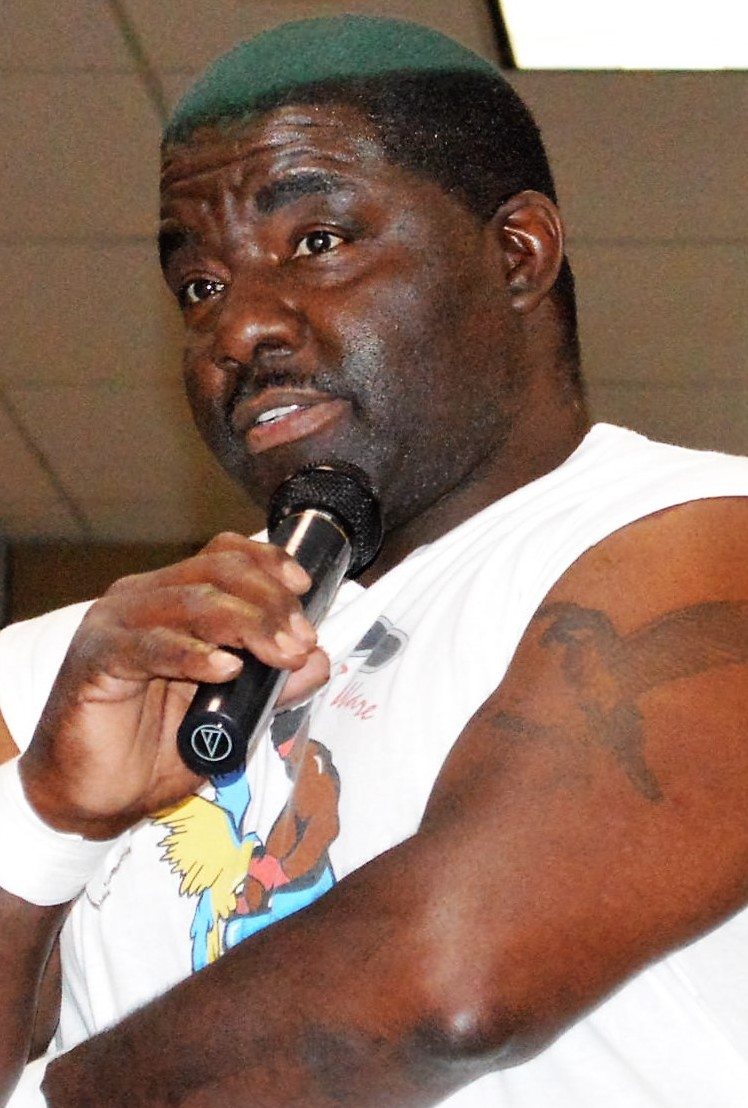
- Ware in 2016

Personal information
- Born: James Williams Ware, Jr. June 20, 1957 (age 69) Union City, Tennessee, U.S.
- Spouses: Joyce Ware (died 2009); Tamela James (m. 2020)

Professional wrestling career
- Ring name(s): Koko Ware; Koko B. Ware; Stagger Lee; Sweet Brown Sugar; The Birdman
- Billed height: 5 ft 7 in (1.70 m)
- Billed weight: 228 lb (103 kg)
- Billed from: Union City, Tennessee
- Trained by: Herb Welch
- Debut: 1978
- Retired: 2019

James Williams Ware Jr. (born June 20, 1957), better known by his ring name Koko B. Ware, is an American retired professional wrestler. He debuted in 1978 and became widely popular in 1986. He later went on to the World Wrestling Federation, where he went from strong mid-carder to jobber to the stars. "The Birdman" came to the ring with a blue-and-yellow macaw named Frankie, both flapping and dancing before and after his matches. Before joining the WWF, he was in several tag teams, most notably with Bobby Eaton in Memphis and with Norvell Austin (The PYT Express) in several promotions. In 1993, during the premiere episode, he lost the first Monday Night Raw match to Yokozuna. In 2009, he was inducted into the WWE Hall of Fame.

== Professional wrestling career ==
=== Continental Wrestling Association (1978–1986) ===
==== Early appearances (1978–1981) ====
Ware spent his early days in the sport in the Mid-South, Georgia and other NWA territories. Early in his career, "Koko Ware" (as he was then known) did not find great success, learning the ropes and paying his dues in Jerry Jarrett's Continental Wrestling Association and Nick Gulas' territory.

It was not until late 1980 Ware's fortunes changed when he participated in a battle royal to crown the first ever Mid-American Television Champion. The crowd favorite was Jimmy Valiant, who Ware accidentally knocked into Danny Davis and eliminated. Moments later, Koko dumped Davis to the floor and won his first title. After the match, Valiant returned to the ring and beat Ware down. Ware's feud with Valiant was quickly expanded to include the heel Tojo Yamamoto and Ware's ally, Tommy Rich. When Dutch Mantel returned to the CWA in early 1981 he quickly defeated Ware for the TV title making Ware's first run with the gold a short one.

==== Sweet Brown Sugar and Stagger Lee (1981–1983) ====
Ware floundered until September 1981, when he was chosen to referee a Southern Heavyweight Championship title match between Jerry Lawler and the "Dream Machine". Ware unfairly counted Lawler out to give the Dream Machine the victory, a decision that did not sit well with Lawler nor the fans in Memphis. Koko quickly aligned himself with manager Jimmy Hart and his First Family and changed his ring name to "Sweet Brown Sugar". Sugar never got the best of Lawler but did taste tag-team success alongside Steve Keirn and then with Bobby Eaton. Eaton and Sugar won the AWA Southern Tag Team Championship.

After successfully teaming for a while, Sugar and Eaton started to show signs of dissension, during their last run with the tag-team title Eaton beat Jacques Rougeau for the Mid-American Heavyweight title. During an interview where Eaton and Hart bragged about the victory, Sugar complained that he was unable to win the Southern Title from Terry Taylor. After being fed up, Hart finally slapped Sugar and sent the sulking superstar back to the dressing room after which Eaton commented that Sugar had been "whining like a woman". Later that night the duo defended their title against Taylor and Bill Dundee, losing the title when Sugar "accidentally" kicked Eaton and then left the ring. Eaton and Sugar contested a series of grudge matches centered around the Mid-America title and their issues with each other. The feud got so out of control that it had to be settled with a "loser leaves town" match, a match that Eaton won, driving Sugar out of the arena. Later, a masked man calling himself "Stagger Lee" debuted; the fact that he looked and wrestled like a masked version of Sugar helped make him instantly popular. Eaton, along with the rest of the First Family, tried in vain to unmask Lee but could not manage to do so. Bobby Eaton later turned face, he teamed with "Stagger Lee" for a series of matches.

==== The Pretty Young Things (1983–1984) ====
During a tag-team tournament in 1983, the masked Stagger Lee teamed up with fellow face Norvell Austin to take on "Fargo's Fabulous Ones" (Tommy Rich and "Hot Stuff" Eddie Gilbert). During the course of the match Stagger Lee's mask was removed to reveal the man beneath it, prompting a heel turn for Ware. Austin and Ware became a regular tag team dubbed "The Pretty Young Things" or ("The PYT Express"). The two men soon began wearing red leather jackets, and each had a single white glove on, in an obvious imitation of Michael Jackson to further enhance their "pretty boy" image. The team defeated Elijah Akeem and Kareem Mohammad for the AWA Southern Tag Team Championship in February 1984; almost two weeks later, Akeem and Mohammad regained the title.

In August 1984, The Pretty Young Things began wrestling for World Class Championship Wrestling in Texas. They remained with the promotion until November 1984.

In December 1984 the Pretty Young Things began wrestling for Championship Wrestling from Florida. On February 26, 1985, Austin and Ware defeated Jay and Mark Youngblood to win the NWA Florida United States Tag Team Championship. Two weeks later on March 5, 1985, the team re-lost the title to the Youngbloods. They left the promotion in March 1985.

After dropping the gold in Florida, the Pretty Young Things returned to the Continental Wrestling Association in April 1985. There, they won the AWA Southern Tag Team title twice, both times from The Fabulous Ones (Steve Keirn and Stan Lane) as they feuded with the top face team of the promotion. The team dissolved in July 1985 when Austin left for Continental Championship Wrestling.

==== NWA Mid-America Heavyweight Champion (1985–1986) ====
In August 1985, Ware won a tournament for the vacant NWA Mid-America Heavyweight Championship. He held the title until October, when he lost to Harley Race; he regained the title the following month. His final reign ended in January 1986 when he lost to Buddy Landel. Ware left the Continental Wrestling Association later that month to join the Universal Wrestling Federation.

=== Universal Wrestling Federation (1986) ===
In February 1986, Koko moved on to Bill Watts' Mid-South/UWF territory, where he started calling himself Koko B. Ware. Ware's persona was that of a face who entered the ring to the theme of Morris Day's "The Bird", doing an arm-flapping dance. He left the promotion in August 1986 upon signing with the World Wrestling Federation.

=== World Wrestling Federation (1986–1994) ===
==== The Birdman (1986–1992) ====
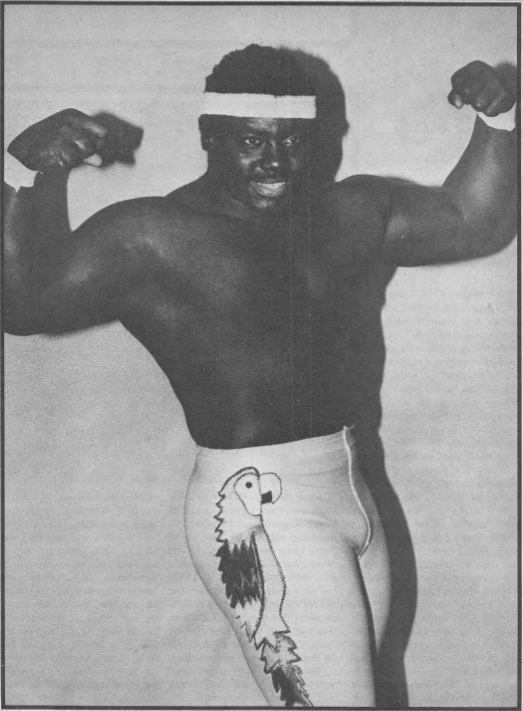
Ware, c. 1987

In August 1986, Ware signed with the World Wrestling Federation, where he continued his fun-loving "Birdman" Koko B. Ware" persona, complete with a macaw named "Frankie". Ware made his debut as a fan favorite on the September 6, 1986, episode of Superstars, teaming with Paul Roma against Hart Foundation (Bret Hart and Jim Neidhart) in a losing effort. His first victory was on the September 7 episode of Wrestling Challenge against Bob Bradley. He made his entrances dancing to the ring to the tune of Morris Day and The Time's "The Bird", flapping his arms and carrying Frankie, who sat on a perch at ringside while Ware wrestled. Bright outfits, colorful sunglasses, a constant smile and his vibrato singing voice made Ware popular, especially with the younger crowd that the WWF mainly catered to during the 1980s. Ware also sang the title track of the 1987 WWF album Piledriver, which then became his entrance music. The song's video featured top wrestlers of the day like Hulk Hogan and The Honky Tonk Man, as well as WWF owner Vince McMahon wearing a red "Hulkamania" shirt and hard hat.

Ware garnered his first big win of his initial WWF run when he upset Harley Race at a house show in East Rutherford, NJ, on October 13. On television, his first major showcase was at the November 29, 1986 Saturday Night's Main Event VIII where he defeated Nikolai Volkoff. He was then granted an Intercontinental Title match against champion Randy Savage on the November 16 edition of Wrestling Challenge, a bout which went to a double countout. The same taping later saw Ware defeat Savage by countout in a dark match.

Ware often lost to bigger stars, such as Butch Reed, Hercules, Greg Valentine, and The Big Boss Man. From 1987 to 1993, Ware appeared on several WWF PPVs (including WrestleMania III where he lost to Reed) and editions of Saturday Night's Main Event, being used mainly to make established or rising stars look good. Ware was the first wrestler on television to fall victim to the perfect-plex of newcomer Mr. Perfect on the January 7, 1989, episode of Saturday Night's Main Event XIX, while at the 1990 Survivor Series, Ware became the first wrestler to fall victim to The Undertaker's tombstone piledriver in the Undertaker's WWF debut match. In a precursor to what would become a regular team years later, Ware occasionally teamed with Owen Hart, wrestling as The Blue Blazer at the time, throughout 1988 and 1989.

During a 1989 European tour, Ware was fired for his part in a physical altercation with WWF executive Jim Troy. Troy had used racial slurs during an argument after which the dispute turned physical, breaking through a glass window in the hotel lobby. Both men were fired, although Koko was almost immediately brought back after Hulk Hogan intervened on his behalf with Vince McMahon.

==== High Energy (1992–1993) ====
In 1992, Ware teamed up with Owen Hart to form the high-flying team known as High Energy, well known in wrestling circles for their gigantic baggy brightly colored pants and checkered suspenders. High Energy feuded with (and generally lost to) The Nasty Boys, The Headshrinkers, and Money Inc. They made only one PPV appearance as a team, a loss to the Headshrinkers at the 1992 Survivor Series. Ware appeared in the first match on the first episode of Monday Night Raw on January 11, 1993, where he was defeated in a squash match by Yokozuna. The team ended in March 1993 after Hart injured his knee. High Energy's final match came in a loss to The Headshrinkers at a live event on March 10.

==== Return to singles competition (1993–1994) ====
With Owen Hart out of action Koko would return to singles competition and immediately entered a house show series with Skinner. At the same time, Ware made appearances in the USWA as part of a talent exchange program with WWF. He continued wrestling in the promotion through the remainder of the year.

Koko returned to WWF in 1994 when he appeared on the March 21 episode of Monday Night Raw and faced Jeff Jarrett. He would then appear on the April 9 episode of Superstars in a loss to Irwin R. Schyster. Koko picked up his first victory of his return by defeating Bastion Booger on the April 16, 1994, episode of WWF Mania. Koko then embarked on a house show tour in England where he faced Jarrett and Kwang. On May 19, he defeated The Genius and followed it up a night later with three more wins over Poffo later that month. Koko faced his former partner Owen Hart on the June 18 episode of Superstars. He ended his WWF run with three straight victories as he teamed with Bushwhacker Luke Williams in house show matches in Philippines, Hong Kong, and Singapore against Reno Riggins and Barry Horowitz.

=== United States Wrestling Association (1991–1997) ===
In 1991 Koko made his debut in the USWA. By 1992 the WWF and the United States Wrestling Association started a talent exchange agreement which saw Koko B. Ware return to Memphis. In the USWA Koko was more successful than in the WWF, winning the USWA World Title twice, once from Kamala "The Ugandan Giant" and once from USWA icon Jerry Lawler. Koko also hooked up with Rex Hargrove and won the USWA Tag Team Championship once in 1993. In 1996 he feuded with Brian Christopher and Jerry Lawler. He left in 1997 before the company shut down later that year.

=== Late career (1994–2019) ===
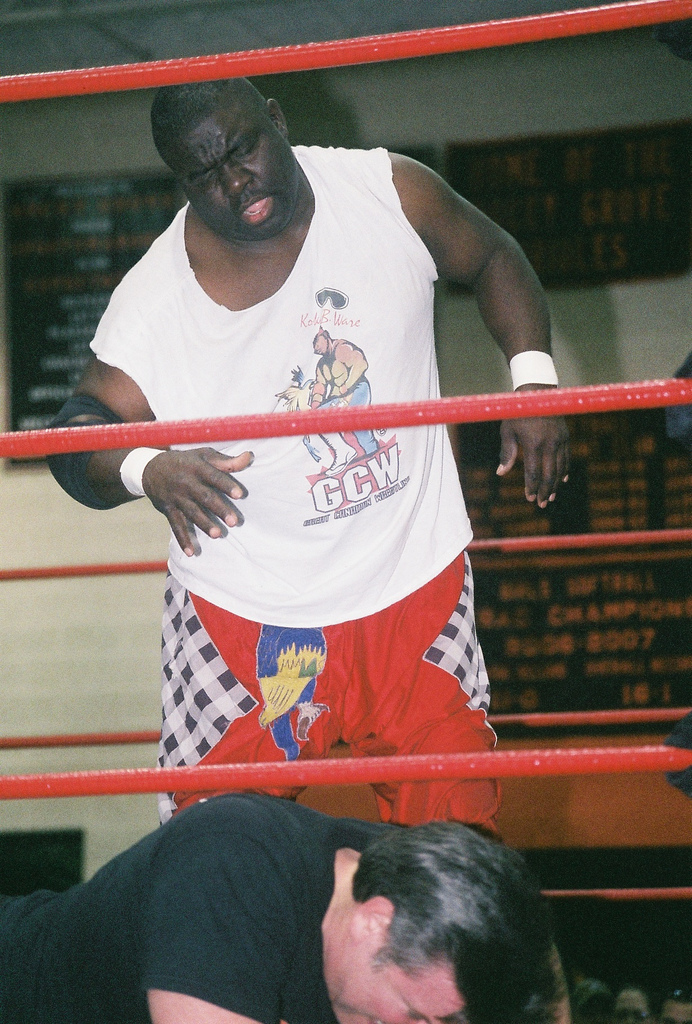
Ware against Lanny Poffo

Ware made a few appearances for the American Wrestling Federation from 1994 to 1996 but did not become a regular before going into semi-retirement in 1997. Ware was interviewed briefly during the 1999 wrestling documentary Beyond the Mat.

After USWA, Ware did not wrestle as much. He started working for the independent circuit. In 1998 to 1999 he wrestled for Power Pro Wrestling in Memphis. In 1999, he retired from wrestling and took a couple of years off.

On the January 25, 1999, edition of WWF Raw is War, Ware made a short-lived return to the World Wrestling Federation where he put on the "Blue Blazer" mask during the Owen Hart angle and Jeff Jarrett in their victory for the tag team championship. When Hart died, the angle was dropped and Ware's services were no longer needed.

On May 18, 2001, Ware returned to wrestling and defeated Brickhouse Brown at Galaxy Championship Wrestling in Little Rock, Arkansas.

By 2003 Ware began to wrestle full time again. He defeated Billy Maverick for the SCW Supreme Title for Supreme Championship Wrestling on August 22. Also in 2003, Ware began competing once again in the Memphis area for the Memphis Wrestling promotion from 2003 to 2007. He also competed at the "World Wrestling Legends" PPV on March 5, 2006, where he defeated Disco Inferno.

He appeared at "WWE Homecoming", Raw's return to the USA Network, on October 3, 2005. He fought (and was defeated by) Rob Conway on the October 28, 2005, edition of WWE Heat. On April 4, 2009, Ware was inducted into the WWE Hall of Fame by The Honky Tonk Man. On February 15, 2011, Ware made an appearance on Tosh.0. The appearance was during a "Web Redemption" segment. During the segment, Daniel Tosh performed an interview with Dave Mills, who became the popular "Crying Wrestling Fan" meme after going into a crying fit and yelling "It's still REAL to me, damn it!" into a microphone during a fan convention. The piece took place in a wrestling ring, with Tosh dressed as The Ultimate Warrior and the pair being fought by a number of WWE Legends such as Ware, "The Million Dollar Man" Ted DiBiase and Sgt. Slaughter battling for a trophy, which ultimately was won by Ware. On May 31, 2014, Ware appeared in the main event at Valour Wrestling's special event to raise money for Lou Gehrig disease. Ware wrestled his last match on August 10, 2019, for Pennsylvania Premiere Wrestling, teamed with John Wes and Matt Turner to defeat James Ellsworth, RJS and Alexander Bateman.

== Personal life ==
James was born in Union City, Tennessee, on June 20, 1958.

In September 2009, Ware's wife died from cancer. In 2020 he married Tamela James.

Ware was a defendant in a 2015 lawsuit filed by WWE after they received a letter from him indicating that he intended to sue them for concussion-based injuries sustained during his tenure with them. He was represented by attorney Konstantine Kyros, who was involved in several other lawsuits involving former WWE wrestlers. US District Judge Vanessa Lynne Bryant dismissed Ware's lawsuit in September 2018.

=== Death of Frankie ===
In March 2002, Ware lost his Macaw, Frankie, in a house fire. According to Ware, he was summoned to the house during church after someone told him his home was burning.

== Professional wrestling style and persona ==
Ware's character featured him carrying a macaw called Frankie, which earned him the nicknames "The Birdman". He performed a brainbuster known as the Ghostbuster. He used a wide range of signature moves including the Missile dropkick, bulldog, dropkick, headbutt or monkey flip.

After being inducted in the WWE Hall of Fame in 2009, Ware has been a point of controversy because, working as a carpenter, he was inducted before world champions Ivan Koloff, Randy Savage or Bruno Sammartino. In 2020, 411Mania writers Steve Cook and Kevin Pantoja discussed Ware's induction. While Cook defended his Hall of Fame status since he was very over and some of his losses were historic, Pantoja described him as "the floor for inductees".

== Championships and accomplishments ==
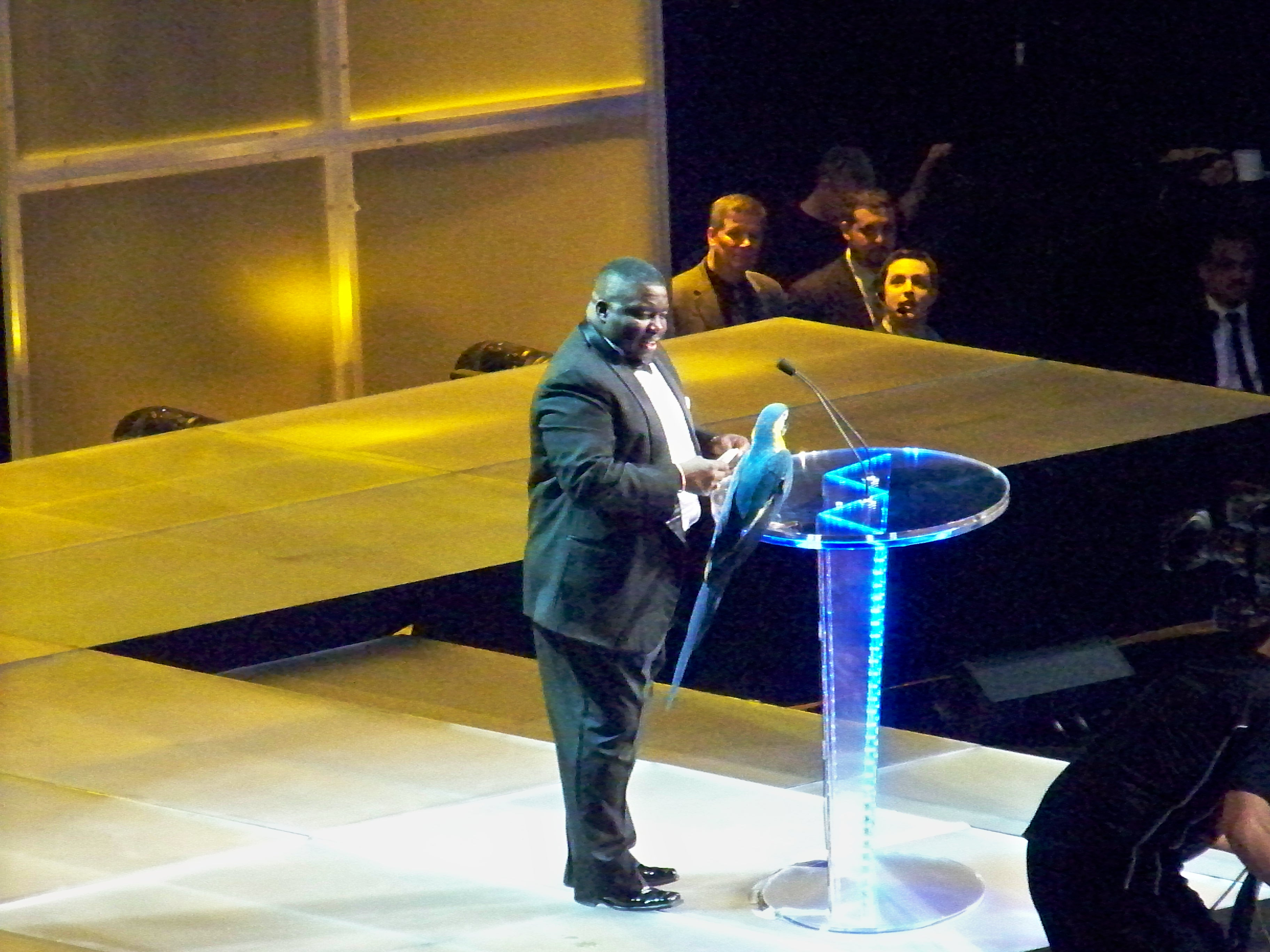
Ware upon his induction to the WWE Hall of Fame in 2009

- Badger State Pro Wrestling
  - BSPW Heavyweight Championship (1 time)
  - BSPW Tag Team Championship (2) – with Juicy Johnny
- Cauliflower Alley Club
  - Men's Wrestling Award (2023)
- Championship Wrestling from Florida
  - NWA United States Tag Team Championship (Florida version) (1 time) – with Norvell Austin
- Continental Wrestling Association
  - AWA Southern Tag Team Championship (7 times) – with Norvell Austin (3 times), Bobby Eaton (2 times), Stan Lane (1 time), and Dutch Mantel (1 time)
  - NWA Mid-America Heavyweight Championship (6 times)
  - NWA Mid-America Television Championship (1 time)
- International World Class Championship Wrestling
  - IWCCW Heavyweight Championship (1 time)
- International Wrestling Alliance
  - IWA Heavyweight Championship (1 time)
- Memphis Wrestling Hall of Fame
  - Class of 2017
- Pro Wrestling Illustrated
  - PWI ranked him #406 of the 500 best singles wrestlers during the "PWI Years" in 2003.
- Real Wrestling Federation
  - RWF Heavyweight Championship (1 time)
- Supreme Championship Wrestling
  - SCW Supreme Championship (1 time)
- United States Wrestling Association
  - USWA Unified World Heavyweight Championship (2 times)
  - USWA World Tag Team Championship (1 time) – with Rex Hargrove
- World Wrestling Entertainment
  - WWE Hall of Fame (Class of 2009)
