= NWA United States Tag Team Championship (Florida version) =

Professional wrestling tag team championship

NWA United States Tag Team Championship (Florida)
- The Florida version of the U.S. tag team championship

Details
- Promotion: Championship Wrestling from Florida
- Date established: January 1961
- Date retired: December 17, 1986
Statistics
- First champions: The Fabulous Kangaroos (Al Costello and Roy Heffernan)
- Most reigns: (As a team) Mike Graham and Steve Keirn (5 reigns) (As individual) Steve Keirn (7 reigns)
- Longest reign: Mike Graham and Steve Keirn (103 days)
- Shortest reign: Mike Graham and Steve Keirn (less than in one day)

The Florida version of the NWA United States Tag Team Championship was a major professional wrestling tag team championship. The title was defended sporadically in the National Wrestling Alliance affiliated Championship Wrestling from Florida from 1961 to 1962, 1978 to 1980, and then 1983 until 1986. While its name suggests it was defended throughout the United States, the title was actually a regional championship that was only defended throughout the Florida territory. The 1978-80 version of the United States Tag Team Championship belt inspired the current design for the NWA United States Tag Team Championship, upon reactivation in 2022.

== Title history ==
Key
| No. | Overall reign number |
| Reign | Reign number for the specific team—reign numbers for the individuals are in parentheses, if different |
| Days | Number of days held |

| No. | Champion | Championship change | | | Reign statistics | | Notes | Ref. |
| No. | Champion | Date | Event | Location | Reign | Days | Notes | Ref. |
|---|---|---|---|---|---|---|---|---|
| 1 | The Fabulous Kangaroos (Al Costello and Roy Heffernan) | January 1961 (NLT) | CWF show | (Note: The location of the match has not been captured as part of the championship documentation.) | 1 | N/A | The Fabulous Kangaroos were billed as champions when they arrived in Florida | |
| 2 | Eddie Graham and Dick Steinborn | November 1961 | CWF show | Miami Beach, Florida | 1 | N/A | | |
| 3 | Tojo Yamamoto and Taro Miyake | November 16, 1961 | CWF show | Jacksonville, Florida | 1 | 14 | | |
| 4 | Eddie Graham and Dick Steinborn | November 30, 1961 | CWF show | Jacksonville, Florida | 2 | 57 | | |
| 5 | The Assassins (Assassin #1 and Assassin #2) | January 26, 1962 | CWF show | Atlanta, Georgia | 1 | 91 | | |
| — | Vacated | April 27, 1962 | — | — | — | — | Championship was vacated after a draw against Ray Gunkel and Bob Ellis | |
| 6 | Ray Gunkel and Bob Ellis | May 4, 1962 | CWF show | Atlanta, Georgia | 1 | 8 | Defeated The Assassins in the rematch for the held up championship | |
| 7 | The Assassins (Assassin #1 and Assassin #2) | May 12, 1962 (NLT) | CWF show | | 2 | N/A | | |
| — | Vacated | 1962 | — | — | — | — | Championship was abandoned for other CWF tag team championships | |
| 8 | The Valiant Brothers (Jimmy and Johnny) | January 1, 1978 | CWF show | Florida | 1 | 24 | | |
| 9 | Mike Graham and Steve Keirn | January 25, 1978 | CWF show | Miami, Florida | 1 | 27 | | |
| 10 | The Brisco Brothers (Jack and Jerry) | February 21, 1978 | CWF show | Tampa, Florida | 1 | 7 | | |
| 11 | Mike Graham and Steve Keirn | February 28, 1978 | CWF show | Miami, Florida | 2 | 103 | Mike Graham defeated Jack Brisco in a singles match to win the championship | |
| 12 | Mr. Saito and Mr. Sato | June 11, 1978 | CWF show | | 1 | 38 | | |
| 13 | Mike Graham and Steve Keirn | July 19, 1978 | CWF show | Miami Beach, Florida | 3 | 7 | | |
| 14 | Mr. Saito and Mr. Sato | July 26, 1978 | CWF show | | 2 | 9 | | |
| 15 | Mike Graham and Steve Keirn | August 4, 1978 | CWF show | | 3 | 22 | | |
| 16 | Mr. Saito and Mr. Sato | August 26, 1978 | CWF show | Lakeland, Florida | 3 | 74 | | |
| 17 | Killer Karl Kox and Dick Slater | November 8, 1978 | CWF show | Florida | 1 | N/A | | |
| — | Vacated | December 1978 | — | — | — | — | The championship was vacated when Kox and Slater split up. | |
| 18 | Killer Karl Kox and Jimmy Garvin | December 5, 1978 | CWF show | Tampa, Florida | 1 | 42 | Defeated Dick Slater and Bob Roop to win the championship | |
| 19 | Mr. Saito and Mr. Sato | January 16, 1979 | CWF show | Florida | 4 | 14 | | |
| 20 | The Brisco Brothers (Jack and Jerry Brisco) | January 30, 1979 | CWF show | Florida | 2 | 18 | | |
| 21 | Jos LeDuc and Thor the Viking | February 17, 1979 | CWF show | Florida | 1 | 12 | | |
| 22 | Killer Karl Kox and Jimmy Garvin | March 1, 1979 | CWF show | Florida | 2 | 11 | | |
| 23 | Pak Song and Jos LeDuc (2) | March 12, 1979 | CWF show | Florida | 1 | 5 | | |
| — | Vacated | March 17, 1979 | — | — | — | — | The championship was vacated when Leduc leaves the area. | |
| 24 | Pak Song (2) and Killer Khan | March 31, 1979 | CWF show | | 1 | 67 | Defeat The Blonde Bombers (Larry Latham and Wayne Ferris) in a tournament. | |
| 25 | Mike Graham and Steve Keirn | June 6, 1979 | CWF show | Florida | 5 | 0 | | |
| 26 | Jos Leduc (3) and Don Muraco | June 6, 1979 | CWF show | Florida | 1 | N/A | | |
| — | Vacated | August 1979 | — | — | — | — | Championship vacated for undocumented reasons | |
| 27 | Dusty Rhodes and Bugsy McGraw | July 14, 1980 | CWF show | Tampa, Florida | 1 | N/A | Defeat The Funk Brothers (Dory Funk, Jr. and Terry Funk) in a tournament final. | |
| — | Vacated | September 1980 | — | — | — | — | NWA North American Tag Team Championship and NWA Florida Global Tag Team Championship replaced the championship. | |
| 28 | The Zambuie Express (Elijah Akeem and Kareem Muhammad) | September 26, 1983 | N/A | "New Mexico" | 1 | 40 | Was said to have won a fictitious tournament. | |
| 29 | Dusty Rhodes (2) and Blackjack Mulligan | November 5, 1983 | CWF show | Lakeland, Florida | 1 | 24 | | |
| 30 | Ron Bass and One Man Gang | November 29, 1983 | CWF show | Tampa, Florida | 1 | 43 | Bass and the One Man Gang defeated Dusty Rhodes and Mike Davis for the championship. | |
| 31 | Mike Rotunda and Mike Davis | January 11, 1984 | CWF show | Tampa, Florida | 1 | 26 | | |
| 32 | The Long Riders (Ron Bass (2) and Black Bart) | February 6, 1984 | CWF show | West Palm Beach, Florida | 1 | 37 | | |
| 33 | The U.S. Express (Mike Rotunda (2) and Barry Windham) | March 14, 1984 | CWF show | Miami, Florida | 1 | 13 | | |
| 34 | The Long Riders (Ron Bass (3) and Black Bart) | March 27, 1984 | CWF show | Florida | 2 | 8 | | |
| 35 | The U.S. Express (Mike Rotunda (3) and Barry Windham) | April 4, 1984 | CWF show | Florida | 2 | 21 | | |
| 36 | The Long Riders (Ron Bass (4) and Black Bart) | April 25, 1984 | CWF show | Miami, Florida | 3 | 31 | | |
| 37 | The U.S. Express (Mike Rotunda (4) and Barry Windham) | May 26, 1984 | CWF show | Sarasota, Florida | 3 | 8 | | |
| 38 | The Long Riders (Ron Bass (5) and Black Bart) | June 3, 1984 | CWF show | Florida | 4 | 16 | | |
| 39 | The U.S. Express (Mike Rotunda (5) and Barry Windham) | June 19, 1984 | CWF show | Florida | 4 | 25 | | |
| 40 | Los Guerreros (Chavo and Hector) | July 14, 1984 | CWF show | Florida | 1 | 88 | | |
| 41 | Jim Neidhart and Krusher Khruschev | October 3, 1984 | CWF show | Tampa, Florida | 1 | 90 | Defeated Hector Guerrero and Cocoa Samoa to win the championship. | |
| 42 | The Youngbloods (Jay Youngblood and Mark Youngblood) | January 1, 1985 | CWF show | Tampa, Florida | 1 | 56 | | |
| 43 | The PYT Express (Norvell Austin and Koko Ware) | February 26, 1985 | CWF show | Tampa, Florida | 1 | 7 | | |
| 44 | The Youngbloods (Jay Youngblood and Mark Youngblood) | March 5, 1985 | CWF show | Tampa, Florida | 2 | 42 | | |
| 45 | Rick Rude and Jesse Barr | April 16, 1985 | CWF show | Tampa, Florida | 1 | 84 | | |
| 46 | Wahoo McDaniel and Billy Jack Haynes | July 9, 1985 | CWF show | Tampa, Florida | 1 | N/A | | |
| — | Vacated | December 1985 | — | — | — | — | McDaniel and Haynes split up following loss to National tag team champions Ole Anderson and Arn Anderson at Starrcade 1985 in Atlanta (only the National title was on the line). | |
| 47 | The Fabulous Ones (Stan Lane and Steve Keirn (6)) | July 12, 1986 | N/A | "Portland, Oregon" | 1 | 87 | Supposedly defeated the Sheepherders in a (fictitious) tournament final. | |
| 48 | The Sheepherders (Butch Miller and Luke Williams) | October 7, 1986 | CWF show | Tampa, Florida | 1 | 54 | | |
| 49 | The Fabulous Ones (Stan Lane and Steve Keirn (7)) | November 30, 1986 | CWF show | Tampa, Florida | 2 | 16 | | |
| 50 | Kareem Muhammad (2) and Hacksaw Higgins | December 16, 1986 | CWF show | Tampa, Florida | 1 | 1 | Won the championship by forfeit | |
| — | Deactivated | December 17, 1986 | — | — | — | — | Higgins was fired from the CWF and the championship was abandoned. CWF reinstated the state championship as their main tag team championship while recognizing the Mid-Atlantic version of the U.S. Tag Team Championship until its closure in December 1987. | |

== See also ==
- List of National Wrestling Alliance championships
