= Ray Candy =

American professional wrestler (1951–1994)

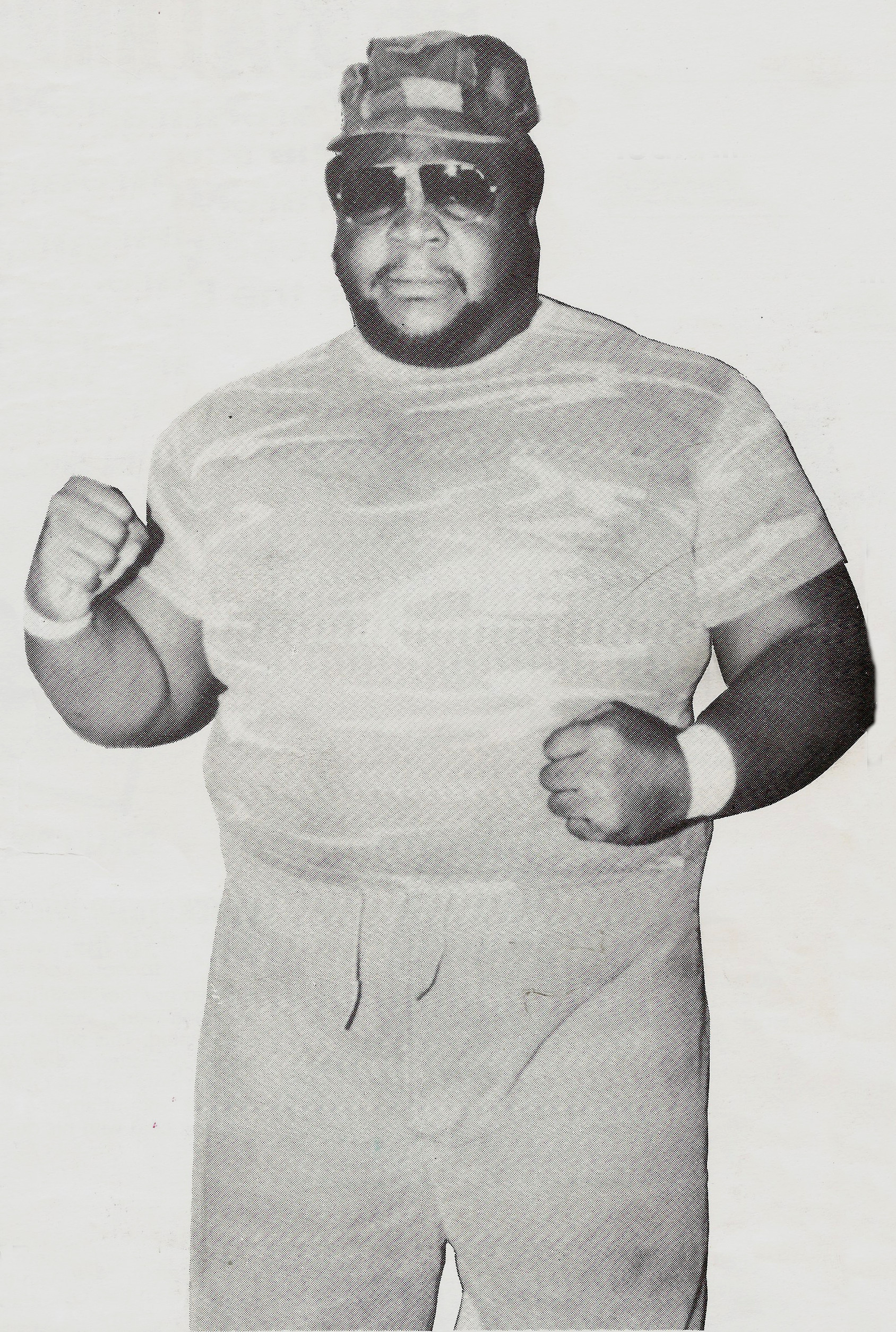
- Candy, circa 1988

Personal information
- Born: Ray Canty; December 3, 1951 Decatur, Georgia, U.S.
- Died: May 23, 1994 (aged 42) Decatur, Georgia, U.S.
- Cause of death: Myocardial infarction

Professional wrestling career
- Ring name(s): Blackstud Williams; Commando Ray; Kareem Muhammad; Masked Superfly; Ray Candy; Super Mario Man
- Billed height: 6 ft 5 in (196 cm)
- Billed weight: 341 lb (155 kg)
- Billed from: Decatur, Georgia
- Trained by: Dory Funk Jr.
- Debut: 1973
- Retired: 1990

Ray Canty (December 3, 1951 – May 23, 1994), better known by the ring name Ray Candy, was an American professional wrestler who worked for a variety of different wrestling promotions in the United States, Japan and Puerto Rico such as Jim Crockett Promotions, All Japan Pro Wrestling, World Wrestling Council and others. He also competed as Blackstud Williams, Super Mario Man, Commando Ray, Masked Superfly and Kareem Muhammad.

As Kareem Muhammad he formed a tag team with Elijah Akeem as the tag team "The Zambuie Express". He also spent time as part of Skandor Akbar's Devastation Inc. group as well as a team known as "The Shock Troops" with Ed Gantner and "The Commandos" with Commando Boone. Canty was responsible for training New Jack for his professional wrestling career.

== Professional wrestling career ==
=== Early career (1973–1983) ===
Ray Canty was trained for his professional wrestling career by former NWA World Heavyweight Championship holder Dory Funk Jr. before making his in-ring debut in 1973. Starting out he adopted the ring name "Ray Candy", a modified version of his birth name. To start with Candy worked for the local All-South Wrestling Alliance (ASWA) based out of Atlanta, Georgia. In the ASWA he won the ASWA United States Championship early in his career. He later worked for Dory Funk Sr.'s National Wrestling Alliance Western States Sports promotion. In Western States Sports, he won both the NWA Western States Heavyweight Championship and the NWA Western States Tag Team Championship, teaming with his mentor Dory Funk Jr.

By 1976, Canty was a regular worker for Championship Wrestling from Florida (CWF), but also worked for the nearby NWA Mid-America promotion where he held the NWA Mid-America Tag Team Championship twice while teaming with Pez Whatley. In 1979 Candy was invited to work for All Japan Pro Wrestling (AJPW), touring Japan several times. On October 12, 1979, Candy and Abdullah the Butcher won the NWA International Tag Team Championship, defeating Giant Baba and Jumbo Tsuruta. The duo only held the championship for a week before Baba and Tsuruta regained them. Candy competed in the 1980 Champion Carnival, where he defeated Motoshi Okumura, Carl Fergie, the Mysterious Assassin and Rocky Hata to earn a total of eight points, enough for eight place.

=== Zambuie Express / Muslim Connection (1983–1984) ===
In 1983, the Florida bookers came up with the idea to team up Candy with the 6 ft 2 in (1.88 m), 310 lb (140 kg; 22 st), Leroy Brown. Candy took the Muslim name "Kareem Muhammad" while Brown was billed as "Elijah Akeem". Together they formed "the Zambuie Express", which was at times billed as "the Muslim Connection" in some promotions. The duo began to wear camouflage pants and shirts to the ring, adopting militaristic Muslim in ring characters, based to some extent on the Black Panther Party. The two toured mainly in the southern parts of the United States where their racially charged characters made them very hated. The team was often managed by Sir Oliver Humperdink and was part of the "House of Humperdink". In Florida the duo defeated Mike Graham and Scott McGhee to win the NWA Florida Global Tag Team Championship on July 31, 1983. The duo held the championship until September of that year, when it was replaced by the Florida version of the NWA United States Tag Team Championship. The Zambuie Express were declared the United States Champions, with the storyline being that they won a tournament. Two months later the Zambuie Express lost the championship to the team of Dusty Rhodes and Blackjack Mulligan on November 5, 1983.

From Florida the team traveled to Memphis to compete for the Continental Wrestling Association (CWA) where they were immediately pitted against the top face team of the territory The Fabulous Ones (Stan Lane and Steve Keirn). On January 24, 1984, the Zambuie Express were awarded the AWA Southern Tag Team Championship when the Fabulous Ones failed to show up for a match, but the titles were declared vacant instead of giving them to Akeem and Muhammad. The CWA held a tournament for the vacant championship, a tournament won by the Zambuie Express as they defeated the Pretty Young Things (Koko B. Ware and Norvell Austin) in the final match. The Pretty Young Things won the championship only a week later, defeating the Zambuie Express on CWA's weekly show at the Mid-South Coliseum. Eight days later the Zambuie Express regained the championship. The duo held on to the belts until March 12, 1984, when they lost to Jerry Lawler and Jos LeDuc. The team toured with New Japan Pro-Wrestling in the spring of 1984 and then ended up working for Jim Crockett Promotions based in the Carolinas by the summer of 1984. The team sided with Paul Jones and became part of Paul Jones' Army as they fought against Jimmy Valiant and Valiant's friends. The Express competed on the 1984 version of Starrcade, where they lost to the team of Buzz Tyler and The Masked Assassin #1. The loss to Tyler and the Assassin was one of the last matches the Zambuie Express worked together, splitting up a short time later.

=== Late career (1984–1990) ===
Candy later formed a duo with Ed Gantner, known as the Shock Troops, working for the CWF. On November 25, 1986, Canty, while still working as Kareem Muhammad, defeated Barry Windham to win the NWA Florida Heavyweight Championship, holding it until December 2 where he lost it to Ron Simmons. He later teamed up with Hacksaw Higgins to win the NWA United States Tag Team Championship, although the duo only held it for a day. In late 1986 Candy worked a tour with New Japan Pro-Wrestling under the ring name "Super Mario Man", a moniker that seemed more appropriate for an Italian plumber than a 6 ft 5 in (1.96 m), 410 lb (190 kg) African American wrestler. In 1987 he travelled to Puerto Rico, working for the World Wrestling Council (WWC) where he won the WWC Puerto Rico Heavyweight Championship on June 6 from Mighty Igor, holding it for about six months before losing it to Miguel Perez, Jr. In 1988 he took the ring name "Commando Ray", teaming with "Commando Boone" (AKA Grizzly Boone) to for a team known as "The Commandos. Candy's last major match was at the 1988 Starrcade, where he was a part of a Bunkhouse Battle royal, a match that was only seen by the audience in the Norfolk Scope.

== Personal life ==
After his retirement from professional wrestling in 1990, Canty returned to Decatur to work as a dispatcher and supervisor for a local transport firm. He was also responsible for training Glenn Jacobs (Kane in WWE) and New Jack.

== Death ==
On May 23, 1994, he died at his home in Decatur, after suffering a heart attack.

== Championships and accomplishments ==
- All Japan Pro Wrestling
  - NWA International Tag Team Championship (1 time) – with Abdullah the Butcher
- All-South Wrestling Alliance
  - ASWA Georgia Championship (1 time)
  - ASWA United States Championship (1 time)
- Championship Wrestling from Florida
  - NWA Florida Global Tag Team Championship (1 time) – with Elijah Akeem
  - NWA Florida Heavyweight Championship (1 time)
  - NWA United States Tag Team Championship (Florida version) (2 times) – with Elijah Akeem (1) and Hacksaw Higgins (1)
- Georgia Championship Wrestling
  - NWA Georgia Television Championship (2 times)
- NWA Mid-America / Continental Wrestling Association
  - AWA Southern Tag Team Championship (3 times) – with Elijah Akeem
  - NWA Mid-America Tag Team Championship (2 times) – with Pez Whatley
- NWA Tri-State
  - NWA Arkansas Heavyweight Championship (1 time)
  - NWA North American Heavyweight Championship (Tri-State version) (1 time)
  - NWA United States Tag Team Championship (Tri-State version) (2 times) – with Steven Little Bear
- Oregon Wrestling Federation
  - OWF Championship (1 time)
- Pro Wrestling Illustrated
  - PWI ranked him # 334 of the top 500 singles wrestlers in 1991
- Southeastern Championship Wrestling
  - NWA Alabama Heavyweight Championship (1 time)
  - NWA Southeastern Heavyweight Championship (Northern Division) (1 time)
- Western States Sports
  - NWA Western States Heavyweight Championship (1 time)
  - NWA Western States Tag Team Championship (1 time) – with Dory Funk Jr.
- NWA Tri-State
  - NWA Louisiana Tag Team Championship (1 time) – with Steven Little Bear
- World Wrestling Council
  - WWC Puerto Rico Heavyweight Championship (1 time)

== See also ==
- List of premature professional wrestling deaths
