= Fabulous Ones =

Professional wrestling tag team

The Fabulous Ones
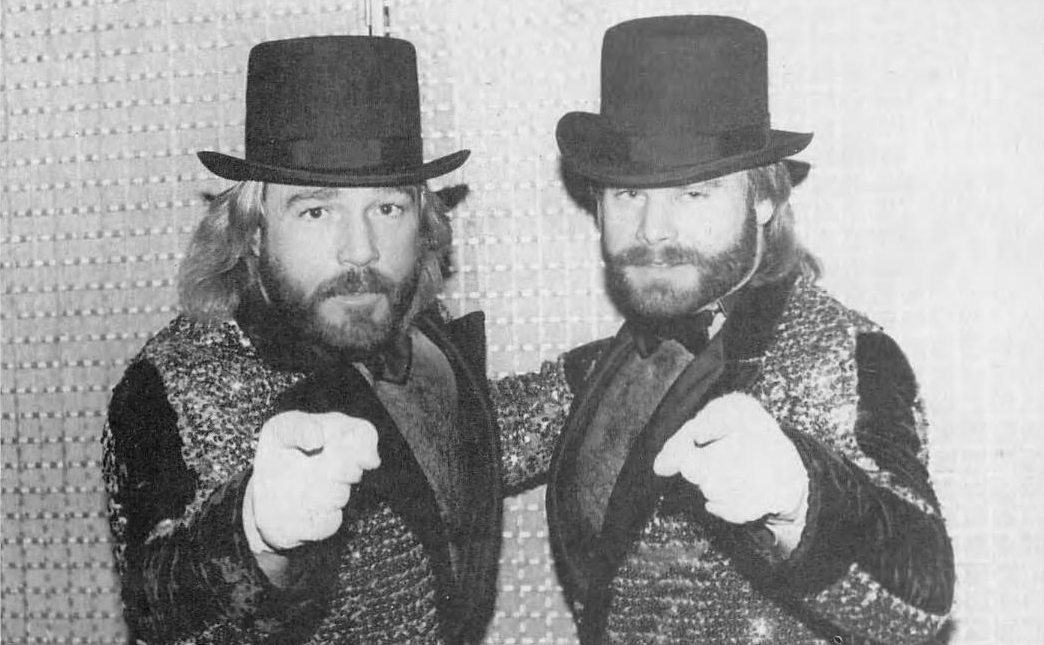
- The Fabulous Ones, Steve Keirn (left) and Stan Lane (right), circa 1985

Tag team
- Members: Stan Lane; Steve Keirn
- Billed heights: Lane: 6 ft 1 in (1.85 m); Keirn: 6 ft 0 in (1.83 m)
- Combined billed weight: 439 lb (199 kg)
- Debut: 1982
- Disbanded: 1991

The Fabulous Ones were a professional wrestling tag team consisting of Stan Lane and Steve Keirn who was active between 1982 and 1991 with brief reunions during the 1990s. The Fabulous Ones competed primarily in North American territories such as the Continental Wrestling Association, Florida Championship Wrestling, Southwest Championship Wrestling and later on the United States Wrestling Association. The team is considered one of the first teams to adopt the “Funloving Pretty Boy” gimmick later used by teams such as The Rock 'n' Roll Express, The Fantastics and the Rockers.

== History ==
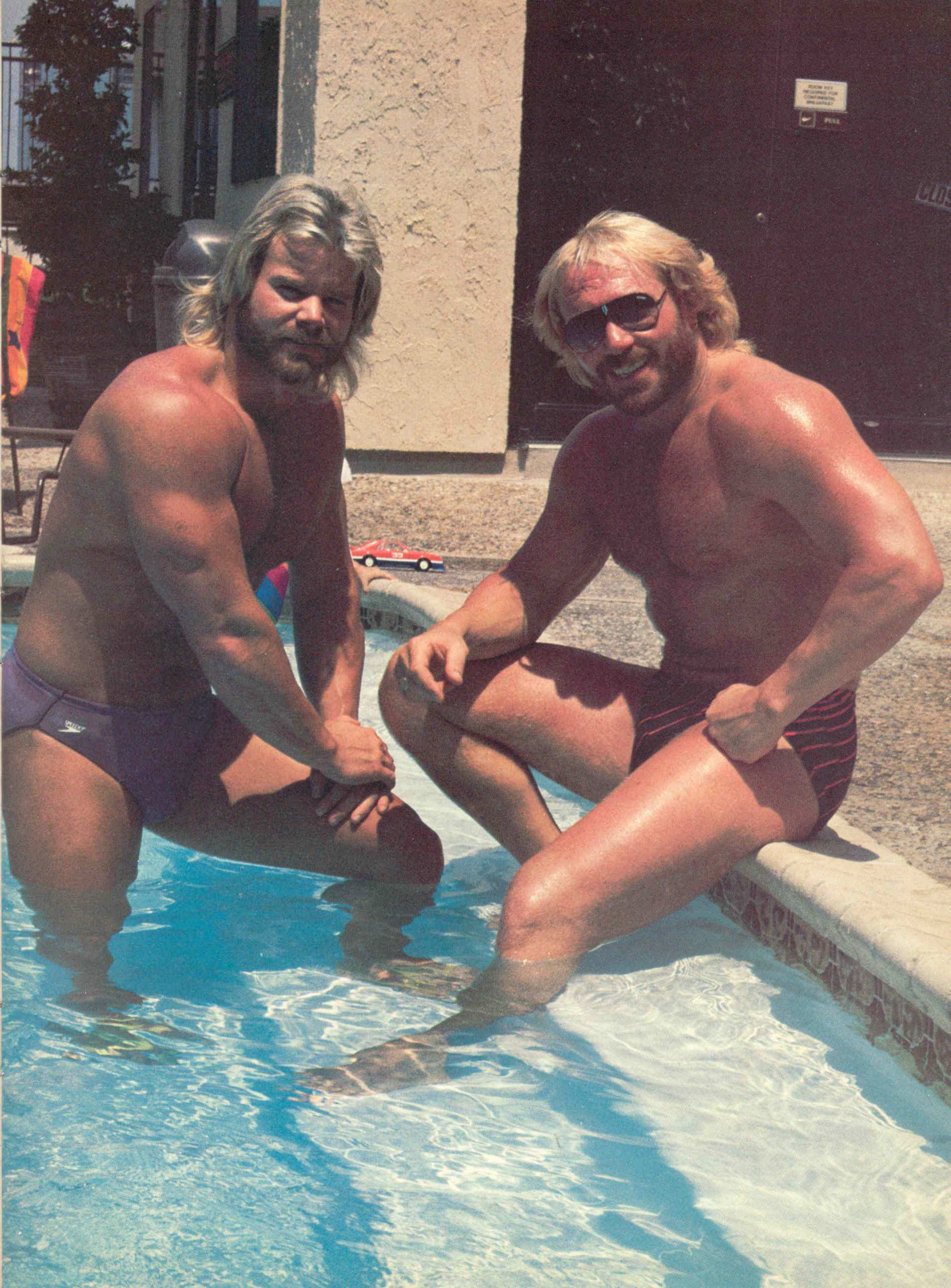
Stan Lane (left) and Steve Keirn (right), circa 1985

Steve Keirn made his professional wrestling debut in 1972, working mostly in the Southern territories of the United States. Keirn often found himself working as a tag-team, most notably alongside Mike Graham in Championship Wrestling from Florida. Keirn had joined the Continental Wrestling Association in 1981 as a face and held both singles and tag-team gold. Stan Lane made his professional debut in 1978 and like Keirn had worked mainly in the Southern regions. Lane had come into CWA as a heel in late 1981 but turned face in early 1982 feuding with his former manager Jimmy Hart and his stable of wrestlers.

=== Coming Together ===
Keirn and Lane were first brought together in early 1982. Jerry Lawler and Jerry Jarrett decided to give the two ”Pretty boys” a big push right off the bat, shooting a couple of music videos starring Lane and Keirn set to ZZ Top’s "Sharp Dressed Man" and Billy Squier’s "Everybody Wants You" while wearing top hats, sequin tuxedos and the like. This was one of the first times where music videos were used to get a wrestler ”over” (popular) in pro wrestling, a practice more common today. The CWA bookers also persuaded local hero The "Fabulous" Jackie Fargo to lend his endorsement to The Fabulous Ones (earning them the nickname ”Fargo’s Fabulous Ones”), which gave the team instant credibility in the South. The original plan for the Fabulous Ones was for them to dispatch the New York Dolls, then turn heel on Lawler and Dundee and be managed by Jim Cornette, but because of the overwhelming popularity of Lane and Keirn those plans were quickly changed.

==== Rising to the top ====
Their first feud was against Jimmy Hart’s team of “Dream Machine” Troy Graham and Rick McGraw. Hart countered the promotional push of the Fabulous Ones by producing similar videos for Graham and McGraw – dubbing them the “New York Dolls” and dressing them up in tuxedos and top hats like Lane and Keirn. The Fabulous Ones and the Dolls fought week in and week out in the Mid-South Coliseum until the Fabulous Ones were able to beat the Dolls decisively. In the early days the Fabulous Ones also feuded with the original version of The Midnight Express (Dennis Condrey, Randy Rose and Norvell Austin) including a series of unsuccessful challenges for the Express’ Southern Tag Team Championship. Once the Midnight Express lost their titles the Fabulous Ones started to gain victories over the trio both in regular tag and in 8 man tag team matches.

On October 25, 1982, Lane and Keirn defeated Bobby Eaton and Sweet Brown Sugar to win the Southern Tag Team Championship, the first titles that the Fabulous Ones held as a team. By this time the Fabulous Ones were a major draw in the CWA and with the Fabulous Ones holding the main tag team title in the promotion they only got more over. The Fabulous Ones’ popularity came not just from their wrestling skills but also from their charisma and sex appeal that made them especially popular with the female fans. Lane and Keirn's first run with the titles lasted just under a month as they lost the titles to Bobby Eaton and the Dream Machine on November 22 but would regain them from the makeshift team only a week later on November 29.

==== Legendary Rivalry ====
After dealing with Jimmy Hart's stable the Fabulous Ones suddenly got a whole different team challenging them for the gold. Luke Williams and Jonathan Boyd (The Sheepherders) had entered the CWA in the fall of 1982 and soon came head to head with the Fabulous Ones. The Fabulous Ones / Sheepherder feud stands as one of the most memorable and bloody feuds. A feud that would rage on in several promotions between 1982 and 1987. The “pretty boy”, well polished Fabulous Ones and the ugly, brawling savage Sheepherders made for the perfect opponents and repeatedly drew big gates all over the country. The matches started out pretty evenly with the Fabulous Ones and the Sheepherders splitting the decisions but soon turned brutal and often without a definite winner. In December, 1982 the Sheepherders won the Southern Tag Team Championship from Lane and Keirn which only turned the intensity of the matches up a notch. Between late December and Mid February the two teams traded the belts back and forth 4 times with the Fabulous Ones ending up with possession of them in the end. On March 28 the Sheepherders wrestled their last match in the Mid-South Coliseum before leaving the CWA giving the Fabulous Ones (Kayfabe) credit for running them out of Memphis.

After the feud with the Sheepherders ended the CWA sought to copy the success of that feud by having the Fabulous Ones face another team in the same mold as the Sheepherders: The Moondogs, in this case Rex and Moondog Spot. On April 4 the Moondogs won the Southern tag-team title in their usual brutal fashion but were unable to keep the titles for long as the Fabulous Ones regained the titles in an equally brutal match only 3 weeks later. After disposing of the Moondogs the Fabulous Ones began to feud with a team they had faced early on in their career, Bobby Eaton and Duke Myers. Jimmy Hart's team won the Southern Tag-Team Title but did not hold them for long before they ended up around the waist of Lane and Keirn once more. After the Fabulous Ones dropped the Southern Titles to The Grapplers (Tony Anthony and Len Denton) the team did not immediately regain the gold; instead, the Fabulous Ones would spend the rest of the year in the mid card until finally winning their seventh from the Bruise Brothers (Troy Graham and Porkchop Cash, not Ron and Don Harris) on November 29.

==== Going to Texas ====
Around the turn of the year the Fabulous Ones and the CWA parted ways with the duo looking to cash in their success in other territories. The first place the Fabulous Ones show up after leaving Memphis is in Southwest Championship Wrestling from San Antonio, Texas. The Fabulous Ones supposedly won a tournament in Australia to become the first ever SWCW World Tag Team Champions. In reality, there was no tournament; it was just a way to reignite the feud between the Fabulous Ones and the Sheepherders who had been with the SWCW for a while. On March 4, 1984, the Sheepherders defeated the Fabulous Ones for the SWCW gold ending Keirn and Lane's brief stay in Texas.

The Fabulous Ones wrestled in the AWA in 1984 until early 1985. Keirn and Lane had great success in the AWA feuding with wrestlers such as Nick Bockwinkel, Mr. Saito, Bobby Heenan, and the Road Warriors but left the promotion after the Road Warriors went against Verne Gagne's orders and did not drop the AWA world tag team titles to the Fabs when they were told to.

==== Welcome Home ====
After failing to catch on in Texas and leaving the AWA, the Fabulous Ones returned ”home” to Memphis and were immediately thrust into the tag team title chase. On October 8 the Fabs defeated first the Nightmares then the Dirty White Boys before losing to Rick Rude and King Kong Bundy in a one night tournament to crown new Southern Tag Team Champions. Keirn and Lane soon got their revenge by winning their 8th Southern Tag Team title from Bundy and Rude on October 22. The team held on to the gold for a little over 6 weeks before losing it to the team of Don Bass and Roger Smith, also known as the Interns. On February 17, 1985, the Fabulous Ones regained the Southern Tag-Team championship from the Interns before launching into a feud with the PYT Express (Koko Ware and Norvell Austin), a team that like the Fabulous Ones played on the “Pretty Boy” gimmick. On April 15 the PYT Express won the gold through underhanded means and continued to fend off the Fabulous Ones through various “shady” tactics until they were stripped of the gold in June. After the PYT Express left the area Keirn and Lane easily won the Southern Tag Team Title once more defeating Ron Sexton and Billy Travis in a tournament final.

Next for the Fabulous Ones was the return of an old Nemesis, the Sheepherders – in this case Rip Morgan and Jonathan Boyd teaming up as the “Kiwi Sheepherders”. Boyd and Morgan quickly made a mark on Memphis by beating the Fabulous Ones for Southern Tag Team Championship on June 17, 1985. The team was soon stripped of the titles due to excessive cheating but had the titles returned to them when Boyd and Morgan threatened to sue CWA management over the incident. Instead of taking the titles from the Sheepherders by stripping them the Fabulous Ones took the Southern tag team titles from them the old fashioned way – 4 times in a row between September 5 and October 12. The Fabulous Ones won what would turn out to be their last Southern Tag Team Championship on October 12, their 15th Southern Title all together. Few realized that an era in Memphis wrestling was ending when Bill Dundee and Dutch Mantel beat the Fabulous Ones for the titles on November 11.

==== Life after Memphis ====
On April 19, 1986, the Fabulous Ones participated in the first ever Jim Crockett Sr. Memorial Cup held in the New Orleans, LA Superdome but lost in the first round to The Fantastics (Bobby Fulton and Tommy Rogers). On April 20 the Fabulous Ones was part of “WrestleRock”, A stadium show held at the MetroDome in Minneapolis, MN. Keirn and Lane lost to the team of Mike Rotunda and Barry Windham (who previously worked as The U.S. Express in the WWF).

They then started working for Championship Wrestling from Florida, the territory where both men had made their debut. In a turn of events that mirrored their time with SWCW the Fabulous Ones “won” the NWA Florida United States Tag Team Championship in a fictitious tournament that supposedly took place in Portland, OR. Just like in the SWCW the team supposedly beat the Sheepherders in the tournament final and just like in the SWCW the Fabulous Ones immediately started feuding with the Sheepherders over the gold. On October 7 the Sheepherders ended the Fabulous Ones’ first reign with the NWA Florida United States Tag Team Championship and would keep them away from the Fabs until Lane and Keirn finally got the better of them on November 30 where they regained the belts. After losing the Florida US Tag Team title to Kareem Muhammad and Hacksaw Higgins, the Fabulous Ones left once again.

==== One last trip to Memphis ====
After dropping the Florida titles and the promotion folding briefly Keirn and Lane returned to the territory that they were most successful in, Memphis. In Memphis they once again became entangled in a feud with the Sheepherders in a rivalry that up until this point seemed like it would never end. In what would turn out to the last series of matches between the Sheepherders and the Fabulous Ones the Fabs dominated the matches and once again “Ran off” the Sheepherders. The feud with the Sheepherders turned out to be the last moment of glory for the Fabulous Ones as their 5-year run together was about to come to an end.

=== Initial breakup ===
Early in 1987 Dennis Condrey left Jim Crockett Promotions, abandoning the Midnight Express when they were scheduled to appear at an event in Los Angeles as he changed his plane ticket to go elsewhere in order to drop out of sight. Manager Jim Cornette brought in a man that Bobby Eaton was familiar with, having feuded with him extensively in Memphis – Stan Lane. When Lane joined Eaton to form the new Midnight Express it put the final nail in the coffin of the Fabulous Ones, ending their 5-year run. Keirn, meanwhile, would run a wrestling school in Florida, which he trained future superstars like Mike Awesome, Dennis Knight, Diamond Dallas Page, and Dustin Rhodes, to name a few.

=== Brief reunion, breakup, and beyond ===
In December 1990, the Fabulous Ones reunited in their old stomping grounds in Memphis, which was now known as the United States Wrestling Association, this time with Jim Cornette as their manager. On January 7, 1991, The Fabs won the USWA Tag Team Championship from Tony Anthony and Doug Gilbert. They held on to the titles for approximately three weeks before a match against Jerry Lawler and Jeff Jarrett got out of control and the titles were held up, before losing the rematch, and the titles, to Lawler and Jarrett a week later. After leaving the USWA later that year, the Fabulous Ones disbanded in May 1991, after Keirn signed with the World Wrestling Federation, while Lane and Cornette later started Smoky Mountain Wrestling in October 1991, and formed The Heavenly Bodies with Tom Prichard in 1992.

Since then, The Fabs only teamed sporadically, most notably in 1995 where the duo competed in the “Best of Memphis” Tag-Team tournament which they won by beating Tommy Rich and Doug Gilbert in the finals. Since then the Fabulous Ones only reunite on special occasions. Keirn retired from active competition in 2001, after a tour with New Japan Pro-Wrestling, while Lane retired in 2008.

=== Legacy ===
The Fabulous Ones have often been credited with being the innovators of the "Pretty Boy" gimmick for tag teams and one of the first teams to popularize the use of music videos to help make them popular. With the success of the Fabulous Ones it wasn't long before promoters all over the country started to imitate their formula; even the Memphis promoters used the formula again and again with success. The first team to emulate the Fabulous Ones' formula was The Rock 'n' Roll Express, a fact admitted to by Jerry Lawler, and later on The Fantastics (who were originally billed as "The Fantastic Ones). Other teams have used the "fun loving pretty boy" gimmick but none more successfully than The Rockers, a team that started out in the AWA as the "Midnight Rockers" but soon rose to national stardom in the WWF. In ECW in 1996, Stevie Richards and The Blue Meanie did an affectionate parody of the Fabulous Ones. They were also a main inspiration for other promotions. WCW created the team of The West Hollywood Blondes, while WWE modeled several teams after the Fabulous Ones. The Dicks (Chad Dick and James Dick), The Heart Throbs, Well Dunn, and the team of Billy and Chuck were all inspired by the Fabulous Ones.

In recent times, videos of The Fabulous Ones have become running gags on the WWE online comedy show Are You Serious?, where co-host Josh Mathews often cites them as the precursor to Road Dogg's tag team, the New Age Outlaws. They have also been the subject of a comedy article on Cracked.com.

== Championships and accomplishments ==
- Championship Wrestling from Florida
  - NWA United States Tag Team Championship (Florida version) (2 times)
- Continental Wrestling Association
  - AWA Southern Tag Team Championship (15 times)
  - CWA World Tag Team Championship (2 times)
- Pro Wrestling Illustrated
  - PWI ranked the Fabulous Ones # 28 of the best tag teams during the "PWI Years".
- Southwest Championship Wrestling
  - SWCW World Tag Team Championship (1 time)
- United States Wrestling Association
  - USWA World Tag Team Championship (1 time)
  - 1995 “Best of Memphis” Tag-Team tournament winners
