= Gerald Brisco =

American wrestler (born 1946)

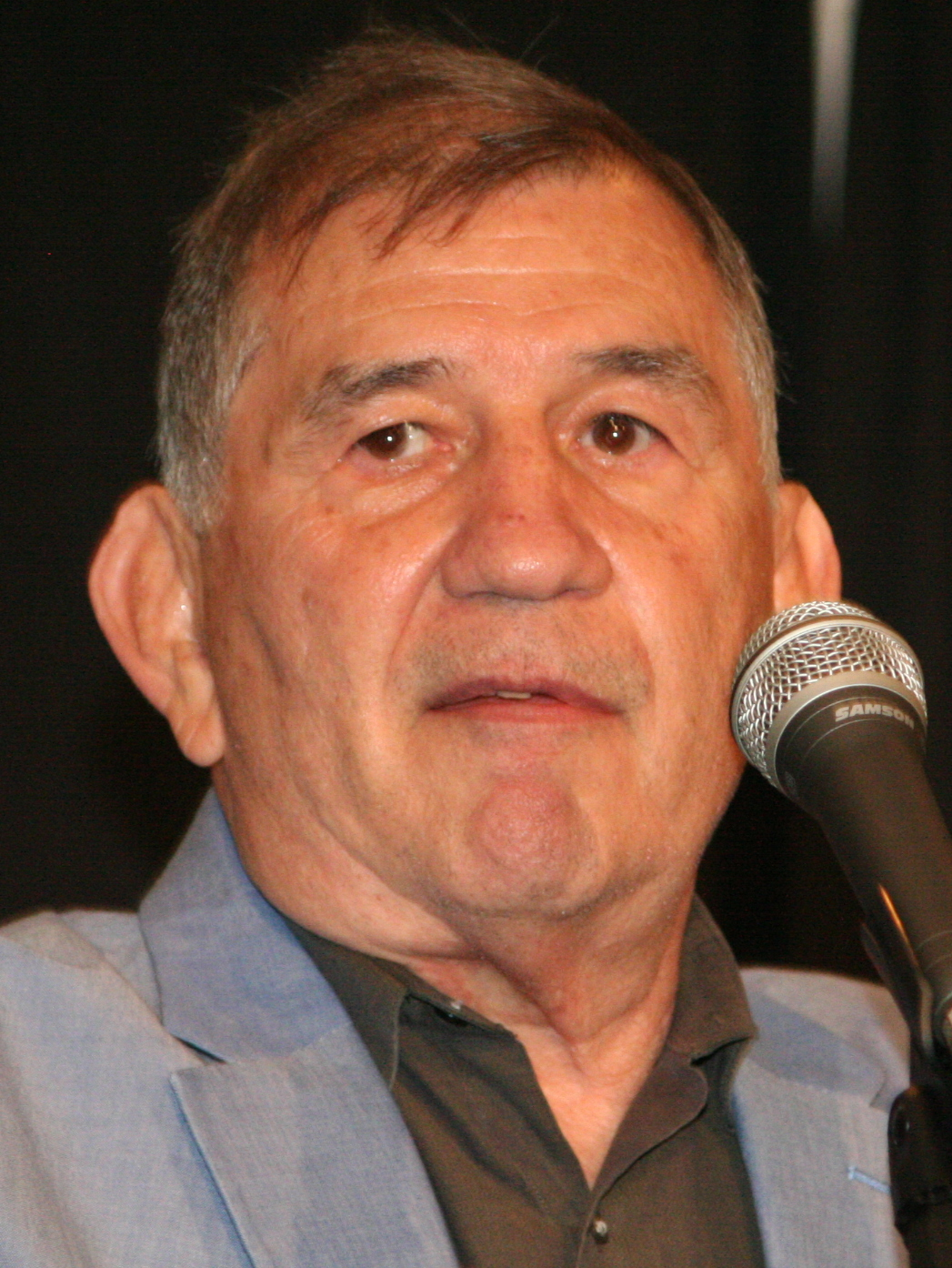
- Brisco in 2014

Personal information
- Born: Floyd Gerald Brisco; September 19, 1946 (age 80) Oklahoma City, Oklahoma, U.S.
- Spouse: Barbara Brisco
- Children: 2, including Wes Brisco
- Family: Jack Brisco (brother)

Professional wrestling career
- Ring name(s): Gerald Brisco; Jerry Brisco; Oklahoma Chickasaw
- Billed height: 6 ft 2 in (1.88 m)
- Billed weight: 209 lb (95 kg; 14.9 st)
- Billed from: Blackwell, Oklahoma
- Trained by: Jack Brisco
- Debut: 1967
- Retired: 2000

Floyd Gerald "Jerry" Brisco (born September 19, 1946) is an American retired professional wrestler. Brisco is best known for his time in the wrestling promotion WWE, where he was a backstage producer and on-screen character. He was most recently a WWE talent scout where he focused on exclusively recruiting amateur wrestlers into the company.

Debuting in 1969, Brisco wrestled for multiple National Wrestling Alliance (NWA) territories throughout the 1970s and early-1980s, in particular Championship Wrestling from Florida and Mid-Atlantic Championship Wrestling. Throughout his career, he teamed with his elder brother Jack as The Brisco Brothers. After retiring as a wrestler in 1985, Brisco moved into a backstage role with the World Wrestling Federation (now WWE). He had a late career resurgence between 1997 and 2000 alongside fellow veteran wrestler Pat Patterson as the onscreen "stooge" of WWE chairman Vince McMahon. He was inducted into the WWE Hall of Fame alongside his brother in 2008.

== Amateur wrestling career ==
Gerald Brisco grew up with five siblings and an absent father in Oklahoma. He followed his brother, Jack Brisco, into amateur wrestling, and was eventually awarded an athletic scholarship to Oklahoma State after winning two AAU tournaments and only losing two high school matches, placing second in Oklahoma States in his only two years of high school wrestling due to broken leg in football. He was a starter on the OSU freshman team winning several matches and tournaments. During the spring break of 1968, Brisco was in Missouri with Jack, and was asked to substitute for his brother's injured tag team partner despite his lack of professional training. After Brisco contracted hepatitis and injured his knee, he decided to drop out of college and become a full-time professional wrestler.

== Professional wrestling career ==
=== The Brisco Brothers (1967–1984) ===
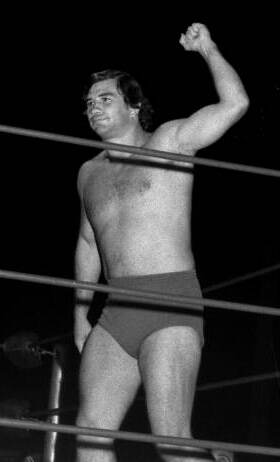
Brisco in 1979

Brisco was trained by his brother and debuted in 1967 as his tag team partner, using the name Gerald Brisco. The Brisco Brothers were a highly successful team, amassing over twenty tag team championships over the course of thirteen years. They arrived in Championship Wrestling from Florida in 1970 (with Brisco becoming Jerry Brisco) and dominated the singles and tag divisions for several years thereafter. It was also in the late 1970s that the Brisco's discovered Terry Bollea, the future wrestling legend best known as Hulk Hogan, who they introduced to Hiro Matsuda for training. Jerry Brisco would amass a number of singles championships throughout the 1970s, including becoming the first holder of the NWA Mid-Atlantic Heavyweight Championship. On June 20, 1981, he defeated Les Thornton for the NWA World Junior Heavyweight Championship.

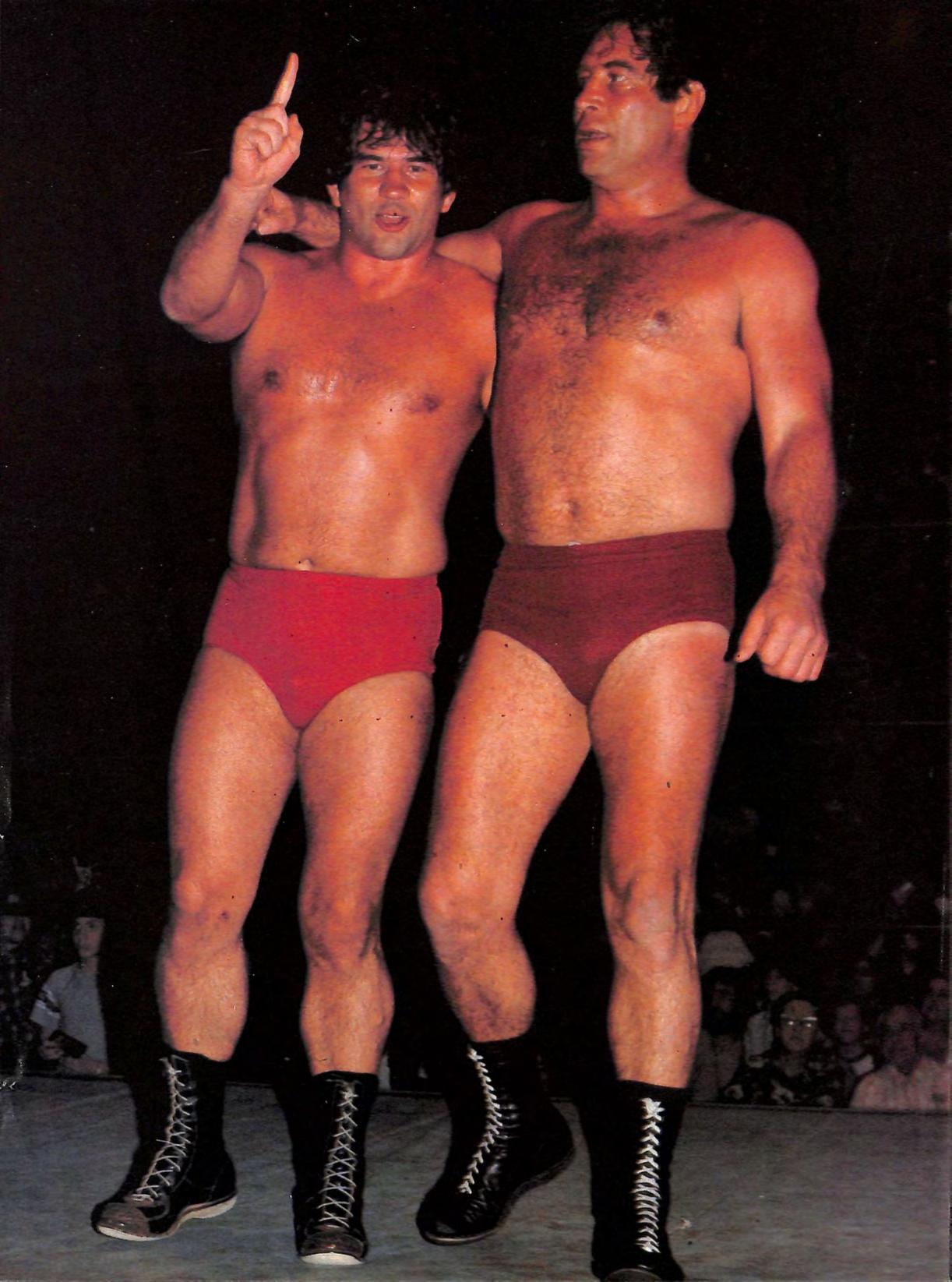
Gerald (right) and Jack (left) Brisco, c. 1983

In 1983, while teaming in the Mid-Atlantic Championship Wrestling territory, the brothers turned heel against the team of Ricky Steamboat and Jay Youngblood, the NWA World Tag Team Champions. The two teams traded the belts back and forth until the feud culminated at Starrcade '83: A Flare for the Gold, with Steamboat and Youngblood regaining the championship. The brothers would hold the title one last time in 1984, ultimately losing to the team of Wahoo McDaniel and Mark Youngblood. They would leave the Mid-Atlantic area shortly after.

The Briscos held minority interests in Georgia Championship Wrestling. In 1984, dissatisfied with the direction of the company and smaller than expected dividends, they convinced equally disgruntled majority shareholder Paul Jones to give them proxy voting of his shares. The three men and Jim Barnett sold their shares to Vince McMahon, enabling him to increase his dominance of the professional wrestling world.

=== World Wrestling Federation/Entertainment/WWE (1984–2020) ===
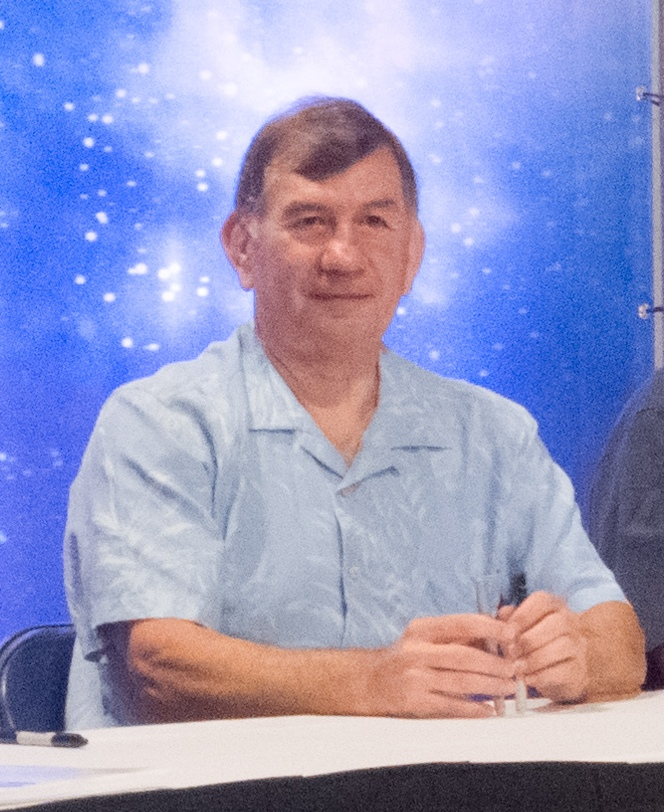
Brisco in 2012 at WrestleMania Axxess.

The brothers entered the World Wrestling Federation in the fall of 1984, once again assuming their familiar role as fan favorites. The Briscos unsuccessfully challenged the North-South Connection, Adrian Adonis and Dick Murdoch, for the WWF World Tag Team Championship. Both men would retire from the ring in early 1985. After retiring, Brisco began working backstage as a road agent and talent scout for McMahon.

Following the 1997 Montreal Screwjob, Brisco capitalized on his notoriety by becoming an onscreen "stooge" of Vince McMahon along with Pat Patterson. The duo portrayed a pair of bumbling comic heels and joined The Corporation and the McMahon-Helmsley Faction. They lampooned Hulk Hogan (then working for World Championship Wrestling, the rival of WWF) by mimicking his trademark gestures and using "Real American", his old entrance theme.

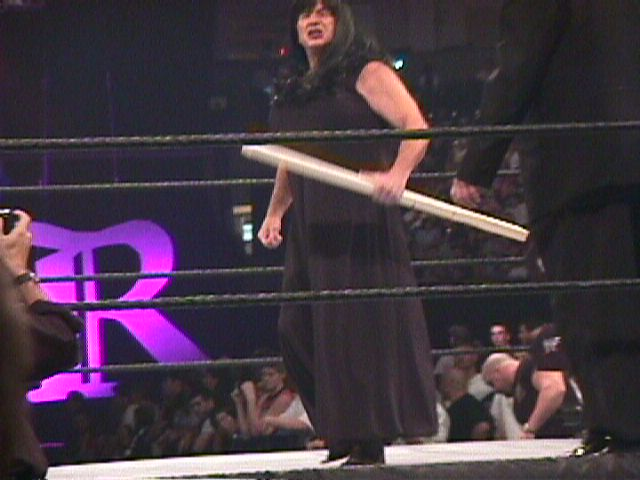
Brisco in drag at King of the Ring

On the May 18, 2000 episode of SmackDown! Brisco won his first WWF championship when he pinned a sleeping Crash Holly to win the perpetually contested Hardcore Championship. Crash regained the title on June 12 but Brisco was intent on regaining. He pursued Holly around New York City but ran afoul of John Shaft, who had agreed to protect Holly. Brisco eventually regained the title the following week with the aid of Pat Patterson in the midst of a match between Crash and his cousin, Hardcore Holly.

As Patterson and Brisco celebrated the victory, Patterson poured champagne in Brisco's eyes then broke a second bottle over his head. He then pinned the (kayfabe) unconscious Brisco to win the Hardcore Championship. Patterson hid from Brisco in drag in the women's locker room, and, after Brisco pursued him into the locker room, Vince McMahon booked them in a Hardcore Evening Gown Match at the King of the Ring. In the course of the match, Holly interfered and pinned Patterson, regaining the title once again.

On July 15, 2005, Brisco was inducted into the George Tragos/Lou Thesz Professional Wrestling Hall of Fame. He appeared at WrestleMania 23 in a party scene and also on the July 23, 2007 edition of RAW. On March 29, 2008, Brisco and his brother were inducted into the WWE Hall of Fame the night before WrestleMania XXIV in Orlando, Florida. In June 2009, Brisco suffered three strokes. Four months later, it was announced that Brisco would not be returning to his position as a road agent in WWE. In March 2010, Jerry Brisco did return to the WWE as a talent scout and recruiter for NXT. According to Jim Ross, on October 19, 2011, Brisco suffered another stroke, a minor one. During the Raw Reunion episode on July 22, 2019, Brisco pinned Pat Patterson off-screen backstage to win the WWE 24/7 Championship. He became the third person to win both the WWE Hardcore Championship and the WWE 24/7 Championship. He would soon after lose the title to Kelly Kelly. He was furloughed, along with many other WWE employees, on April 15, 2020, and was officially released on September 10.

== Personal life ==
Brisco and his wife Barbara have two sons: Wesley who is also a professional wrestler best known for his tenures in former WWE developmental territory Florida Championship Wrestling (FCW), and Total Nonstop Action Wrestling (TNA), and Joseph who is a graduate student at the University of South Florida. Brisco also co-owned a body shop with his brothers Bill and Jack (until the latter's death in 2010), and longtime business partner Travis Allred, known as the Brisco Brothers Body Shop. Jerry and Jack were inducted into the Chickasaw Nation Hall Of Fame in June 2016. On August 11, 2018, Brisco was inducted into the NWHOF Florida Chapter as "Outstanding American."

== Other media ==
Brisco appears as a manager alongside Pat Patterson in WWE 2K16.

After leaving WWE, Brisco began hosting a podcast series with John Layfield.

== Championships and accomplishments ==
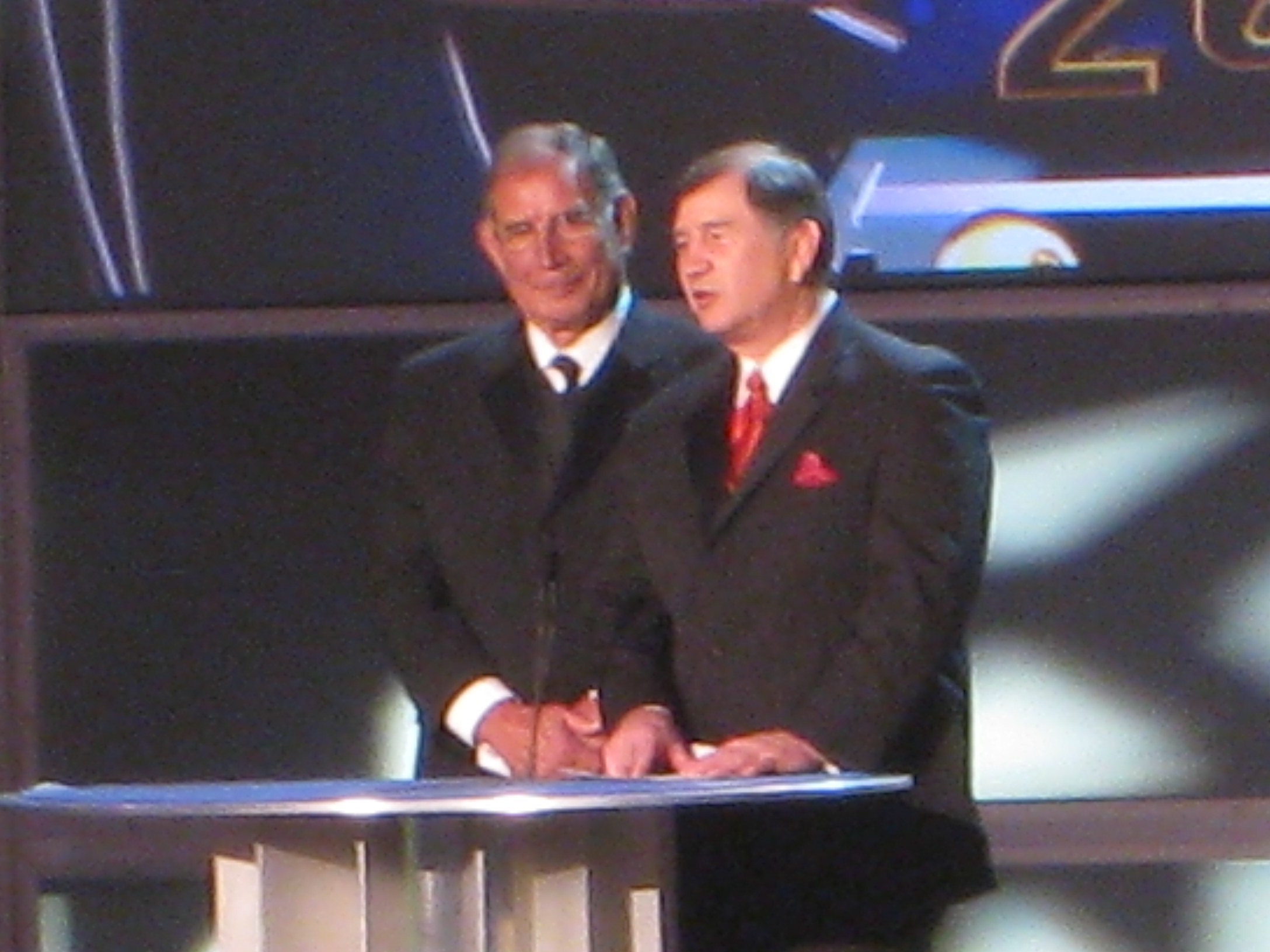
Brisco (right) with his brother Jack being inducted into the WWE Hall of Fame in 2008.

- Cauliflower Alley Club
  - Lou Thesz Award (2015)
  - Other honoree (1996)
- Championship Wrestling from Florida
  - NWA Florida Heavyweight Championship (1 time)^{[G]}
  - NWA Florida Junior Heavyweight Championship (1 time)^{[G]}
  - NWA Florida Tag Team Championship (8 times) – with Jack Brisco^{[G]}
  - NWA Florida Television Championship (1 time)^{[G]}
  - NWA United States Tag Team Championship (Florida version) (2 times) – with Jack Brisco^{[G]}
  - NWA North American Tag Team Championship (Florida version) (2 times) – with Jack Brisco^{[G]}
  - NWA Southern Heavyweight Championship (Florida version) (3 times)^{[G]}
- Eastern Sports Association
  - ESA International Tag Team Championship (1 time) – with Jack Brisco^{[G]}
- George Tragos/Lou Thesz Professional Wrestling Hall of Fame
  - Class of 2005
- Georgia Championship Wrestling
  - NWA Georgia Tag Team Championship (5 times) – with Bob Backlund (1), Jack Brisco (2), Ole Anderson (1), and Rocky Johnson (1)^{[G]}
  - NWA Southeastern Heavyweight Championship (Northern Division) (1 time) (Note: While almost always defended in the Southeastern Championship Wrestling promotion, Brisco won the championship while working on a card hosted by Georgia Championship Wrestling via a working relationship between the two promotions.)^{[G]}
  - NWA Southeastern Heavyweight Championship (Georgia version) (1 time)^{[G]}
- Mid-Atlantic Championship Wrestling
  - NWA Atlantic Coast Tag Team Championship (1 time) – with Thunderbolt Patterson^{[G]}
  - NWA Eastern States Heavyweight Championship (3 times)^{[G]}

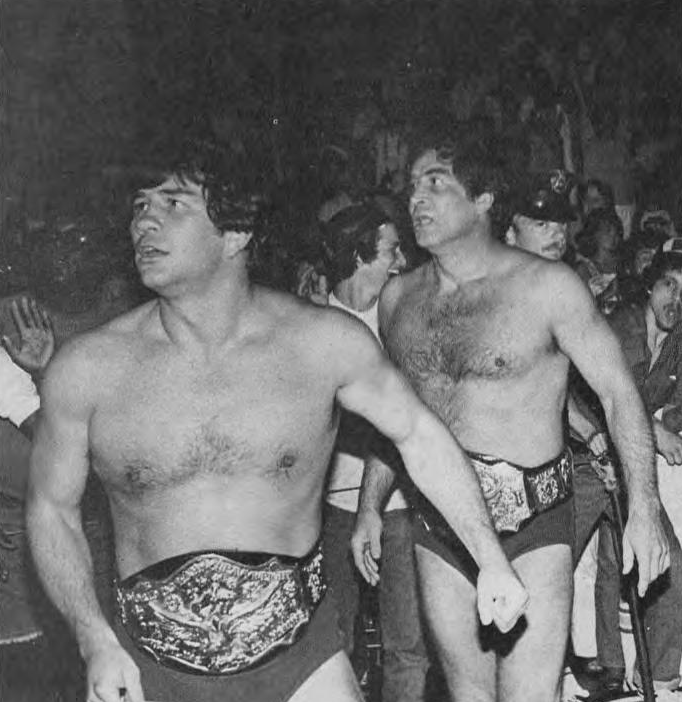
Gerald (right) and Jack (left) as NWA World Tag Team Champions, circa 1983

  - NWA Mid-Atlantic Heavyweight Championship (1 time)^{[G]}
  - NWA World Tag Team Championship (Mid-Atlantic version) (3 times) – with Jack Brisco^{[G]}
- National Wrestling Alliance
  - NWA World Junior Heavyweight Championship (1 time)^{[G]}
- Pro Wrestling Illustrated
  - PWI ranked him # 54 of the 100 best tag teams during the "PWI Years" with Jack Brisco in 2003.
  - PWI ranked him #217 of the top 500 singles wrestlers of the "PWI Years" in 2003
- St. Louis Wrestling Hall of Fame
  - Class of 2023
- Western States Sports
  - NWA Western States Heavyweight Championship (1 time)^{[G]}
- World Wrestling Council
  - WWC North American Tag Team Championship (1 time) – with Jack Brisco^{[G]}
  - WWC World Junior Heavyweight Championship (1 time)^{[G]}
- World Wrestling Federation / World Wrestling Entertainment / WWE
  - WWF Hardcore Championship (2 times)^{[G]}
  - WWE 24/7 Championship (1 time)
  - WWE Hall of Fame (Class of 2008)
- Wrestling Observer Newsletter
  - Wrestling Observer Newsletter Hall of Fame (2023) - with Jack Brisco
