= Steve Keirn =

American professional wrestler (born 1951)

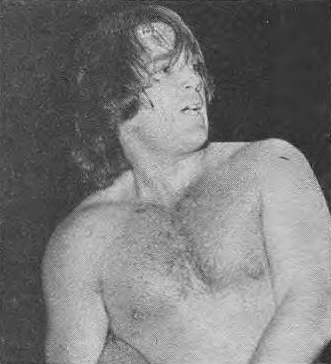
- Keirn, circa 1978

Personal information
- Born: Stephen Paul Keirn; September 10, 1951 (age 75) Tampa, Florida, U.S.
- Parent: Richard P. Keirn (father)

Professional wrestling career
- Ring name(s): Blackhart; Doink the Clown; Skinner; Steve Keirn
- Billed height: 6 ft 0 in (183 cm)
- Billed weight: 215 lb (98 kg)
- Billed from: Tampa, Florida; The Everglades (as Skinner)
- Trained by: Gerald Brisco; Jack Brisco; Dory Funk Jr. Terry Funk; Eddie Graham; Hiro Matsuda
- Debut: 1972
- Retired: 2007

Stephen Paul Keirn (born September 10, 1951) is an American retired professional wrestler. He is best known for his appearances in multiple National Wrestling Alliance territories as Steve Keirn as one-half of the tag team The Fabulous Ones, as well as his appearances with the World Wrestling Federation under the ring name Skinner.

== Early life ==
Keirn graduated from Robinson High School in Port Tampa. His father, Richard Keirn, was a B-17 pilot who was shot down over Germany in September 1944 and became a POW. In July 1965, when Stephen was 13, Richard was shot down over Vietnam and again taken prisoner. He was held in the Hanoi Hilton for seven and half years. While his father was imprisoned, Steve hung out with his school friend Mike Graham whose father Eddie Graham was a wrestling booker, who was later inducted in the WWE Hall of Fame.

== Professional wrestling career ==
=== Championship Wrestling from Florida (1972–1982) ===
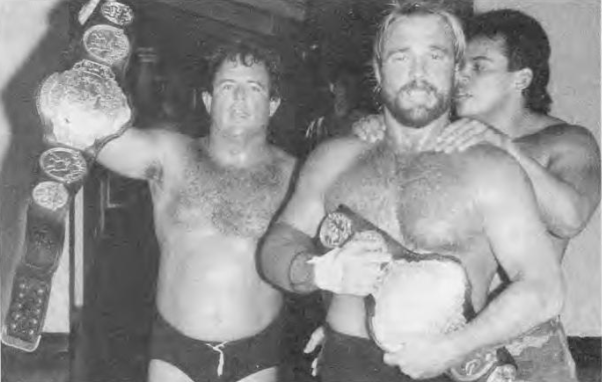
Steve Keirn (right) and Mike Graham (left) with the NWA Florida Tag Team Championships on August 21, 1987.

Much of Keirn's early career was spent wrestling as part of a tag team. While wrestling in Championship Wrestling from Florida (CWF), he held the NWA Florida Tag Team Championship twelve times; once each with Bob Backlund, Jimmy Garvin, and Brian Blair, and nine times with Mike Graham. In addition, the team of Keirn and Graham won the NWA Florida United States Tag Team Championship three times.

In 1980 and 1981, Keirn focused on his career as a singles wrestler. He won many titles in Florida and Georgia, including the NWA World Junior Heavyweight Title by defeating Chavo Guerrero Sr. This title reign was recognized by New Japan Pro-Wrestling, as well as the Los Angeles and Florida NWA territories, but not by the NWA as a whole, which considered the title vacant and held a tournament to crown a new champion. The title Keirn held was later renamed the NWA International Junior Heavyweight Title. Keirn also won the NWA National Television Championship twice, defeating Terry Funk and Kevin Sullivan.

=== Various promotions (1981–1991) ===
In 1981, Keirn began wrestling with the Tennessee-based Continental Wrestling Association (CWA). He was successful as a singles wrestler, winning a tournament to claim the AWA Southern Heavyweight Championship. He also held the NWA Mid-America Heavyweight Championship on two occasions. As in CWF, Keirn found his greatest success in the tag team division. He held the AWA Southern Tag Team Championship 17 times, including 14 reigns as one half of The Fabulous Ones with Stan Lane. Keirn and Lane also teamed to win the CWA World Tag Team Championship twice.

The Fabulous Ones competed in various promotions over the next decade. In 1984, the team won the Southwest Championship Wrestling World Tag Team Championship while wrestling in Australia. In the United States, they won the NWA Florida United States Tag Team Championship twice. In 1991, the pair wrestled in the United States Wrestling Association, defeating Tony Anthony and Doug Gilbert to win the USWA Tag Team Championship.

=== World Wrestling Federation (1991–1993) ===
In the summer of 1991, Keirn debuted in the WWF as Skinner, an alligator hunter from the Florida Everglades. He was portrayed as a generally nasty individual, always chewing on tobacco and sometimes spitting it on his opponent. He carried an alligator claw to the ring with him, which he would often use as a weapon against his opponents. He competed in the 1991 King of the Ring tournament, defeating Virgil in the first round but losing to Bret Hart in the second round. While still being billed as undefeated, he challenged Hart for the WWF Intercontinental Championship at This Tuesday in Texas on December 3, 1991, but lost by submission. Skinner competed in the 1992 Royal Rumble, lasting 2:13 before being eliminated by Rick Martel. At WrestleMania VIII, he was defeated in one minute and eleven seconds by Owen Hart.

Skinner also unsuccessfully challenged Randy Savage for the WWF Championship on the June 29, episode of Prime-Time Wrestling. He also competed in the 1993 Royal Rumble (which was won by Yokozuna) but was eliminated by Mr. Perfect. Skinner was last seen on the February 16 episode of Monday Night Raw taking part in a 16 man battle royal (which was won by Razor Ramon) but was eliminated by Typhoon.

Shortly before WrestleMania IX, Keirn requested to Vince McMahon about playing "Doink II" because he was the same size as Matt Borne who played the original Doink and Keirn came up with the idea of hiding under the ring the entire time at the event, Keirn had to sit under the ring with a monitor so he can see what was going on and when it was time to interfere in Doink's match with Crush, after the match, Keirn had to remain under the ring but was uncomfortable when Yokozuna was wrestling Bret Hart and Hulk Hogan because of Yokozuna's size whenever he fell in the ring, it was too loud.

After WrestleMania IX, Keirn continued to portray "Doink II" and getting involved in Doink's matches and Keirn even wrestled as Doink at house shows or TV tapings when Matt Borne was unavailable. On the May 24 episode of Monday Night Raw, Keirn as "Doink II" switched with Borne as "Doink I" under the ring and attacked Mr. Perfect during the King of the Ring qualifying match, but Perfect was able to beat Keirn as Doink with the perfect plex in which Borne came back from under the ring and the two Doinks attacked Perfect.

On the June 20 episode of Raw, Keirn appeared again as "Doink II" and this time interfering a Two-out-of-three falls match between "Doink I" and Marty Jannetty. During the third fall (Doink I won the first fall and Jannetty won the second fall), Keirn switched with Borne under the ring again and beat Jannetty and Macho Man Randy Savage who was calling the match on commentary ran into the ring and attacked "Doink II" and went under the ring and pulled "Doink I" out and referee Earl Hebner reversed the decision and Jannetty was awarded the match.

On the July 20th episode of Raw, Keirn made his final appearance at "Doink II' when "Doink I" challenged Randy Savage to a match the following week and "Doink I" brought not only "Doink II" into the ring but a third Doink (played by Steve Lombardi) into the ring. Afterwards, Keirn was released when the WWF decided to drop the multiple Doink angle.

=== World Championship Wrestling (1994) ===
Along with Bobby Eaton, Keirn wrestled in World Championship Wrestling (WCW) in 1994 in a tag team known as "Bad Attitude". Despite the tag team success both Keirn and Eaton enjoyed in the past (with The Fabulous Ones and the Midnight Express respectively, with Lane as a common partner), the team made little impact, losing dark matches to Brian and Brad Armstrong at Bash at the Beach 1994 and Fall Brawl 1994. While in WCW, Keirn was also involved in an angle in which masked men attacked Hulk Hogan. Several times in October 1994, Keirn wore a black mask to attack Hogan during and after Hogan's matches.

=== Later career (1994–2001) ===
After WCW, Keirn worked in the independent circuit mainly in Florida and Tennessee. He retired in 2001 after a tour for New Japan Pro Wrestling.

=== Retirement and post-career (2001–present) ===
Since the late 1980s, Keirn has run a school to train wrestlers. Originally located in Tampa, Florida, Keirn's "Professional Wrestling School of Hard Knocks" is now located in Brandon, Florida. Keirn helped train many wrestlers, including Mike Awesome, Dennis Knight, Diamond Dallas Page, Dustin Rhodes, Tracy Smothers, and Roman Reigns. The school was incorporated into the WWE's developmental territory, Florida Championship Wrestling, which opened on June 26, 2007, and Keirn was named President of FCW and made regular appearances on FCW television.

His last match was on December 10, 2007, at the 15th Anniversary Raw participating in a Battle Royal where he was eliminated from the match by Sgt. Slaughter. On August 14, 2012, FCW was discontinued and the WWE Performance Center opened on July 11, 2013.

On May 9, 2026, Keirn was shown and acknowledged in the crowd at Backlash.

== Autobiography ==
On March 10, 2023, Keirn's autobiography, The Keirn Chronicles Volume One: The Fabulous Wrestling Life of Steve Keirn, was released. The book is coauthored by Ian Douglass, a contributor to the autobiographies of Dan Severn, Hornswoggle, Bugsy McGraw and Brian Blair, and it includes forewords from Stan Lane and CM Punk, and an afterword from Natalya Neidhart. The book was a finalist for Best Pro Wrestling Book in the 2023 Wrestling Observer Newsletter Awards.

The second edition of Keirn's memoirs, The Keirn Chronicles Volume Two: The Phenomenal Wrestling Resurgence of Steve Keirn, was released on April 15, 2024. This book was also coauthored by Ian Douglass, and includes a foreword from Drew McIntyre and an afterword from Ted DiBiase.

== Championships and accomplishments ==
- Century Wrestling Alliance
  - CWA Television Championship (1 time)
- Championship Wrestling from Florida
  - NWA Brass Knuckles Championship (Florida version) (1 time)
  - NWA Florida Heavyweight Championship (5 times)
  - NWA Florida Tag Team Championship (12 times) – with Mike Graham (9), Jimmy Garvin (1), Bob Backlund (1), and Brian Blair (1)
  - NWA Florida Television Championship (1 time)
  - NWA North America Tag Team Championship (Florida version) (1 time) – with Mike Graham
  - NWA Southern Heavyweight Championship (Florida version) (2 times)
  - NWA United States Tag Team Championship (Florida version) (5 times) – with Mike Graham (3) and Stan Lane (2)
- Georgia Championship Wrestling
  - NWA Georgia Heavyweight Championship (1 time)
  - NWA Georgia Tag Team Championship (1 time) – with Mr. Wrestling
  - NWA National Television Championship (2 times)
- Gulf Coast Championship Wrestling
  - NWA United States Tag Team Championship (Gulf Coast version) (1 time) – with Ricky Gibson
- NWA Hollywood Wrestling
  - NWA International Junior Heavyweight Championship (1 time)
- NWA Mid-America / Continental Wrestling Association
  - AWA Southern Heavyweight Championship (1 time)
  - AWA Southern Tag Team Championship (17 times) – with Stan Lane (14), Bill Dundee (2), and Terry Taylor (1)
  - CWA International Tag Team Championship (1 time) – with Mark Starr
  - CWA World Tag Team Championship (2 times) – with Stan Lane
  - NWA Mid-America Heavyweight Championship (2 times)
- Pro Wrestling Illustrated
  - PWI ranked him #132 of the top 500 singles wrestlers of the "PWI Years" in 2003
- Southwest Championship Wrestling
  - SCW World Tag Team Championship (1 time) – with Stan Lane
- United States Wrestling Association
  - USWA World Tag Team Championship (1 time) – with Stan Lane

== See also ==
- The Fabulous Ones
