= Heel (professional wrestling) =

Villainous or "bad guy" character in professional wrestling

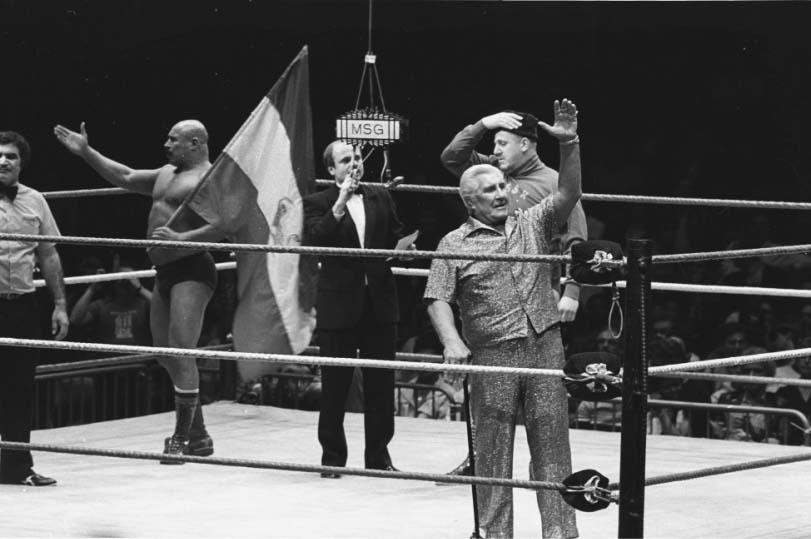
Foreign heels The Iron Sheik and Nikolai Volkoff and manager Freddie Blassie taunt an American crowd at Madison Square Garden in the 1980s.

In professional wrestling, a heel (also known as a rudo in Mexico) is a wrestler who portrays a villain, "bad guy", "baddie", "evil-doer", or "rulebreaker", and acts as an antagonist to the faces, who are the heroic protagonist or "good guy" characters. Not everything a heel wrestler does must be villainous: heels need only to be booed or jeered by the audience to be effective characters. Most of the truly successful heels embrace other aspects of their devious personalities, such as cheating to win or using foreign objects. "The role of a heel is to get 'heat,' which means spurring the crowd to obstreperous hatred". The role generally involves cheating and any other manner of socially unacceptable behavior.

To gain heat (with boos and jeers from the audience), heels are often portrayed as behaving in an immoral manner by breaking rules or otherwise taking advantage of their opponents outside the bounds of the standards of the match. Others do not (or rarely) break rules, but instead exhibit unlikeable, appalling, and deliberately offensive and demoralizing personality traits such as arrogance, cowardice, or contempt for the audience. Many heels do both, cheating as well as behaving nastily. No matter the type of heel, the most important role is that of the antagonist, as heels exist to provide a foil to the face wrestlers. If a given heel is cheered over the face, a promoter may opt to turn that heel to face or the other way around, or to make the wrestler do something even more despicable to encourage heel heat. Some performers display a mixture of both positive and negative character traits. In wrestling terminology, these characters are referred to as tweeners (short hand for the "in-between" good and evil actions these wrestlers display). WWE has been cited as a company that is doing away with the traditional heel/face format due in part to audiences' willingness to cheer for heels and boo babyfaces.

In "local" wrestling (e.g., American wrestling) it was common for the faces to be "local" (e.g., Hulk Hogan, John Cena, and Stone Cold Steve Austin) and the heels to be portrayed as "foreign" (e.g., Gunther, Alberto Del Rio, Ivan Koloff, The Iron Sheik, Rusev/Miro, Jinder Mahal, and Muhammad Hassan).

In the world of lucha libre, a professional wrestling style originating in Mexico, most rudos are generally known for being brawlers and for using physical moves that emphasize brute strength or size, often having outfits akin to demons, devils, or other tricksters. This is contrasted with most heroic técnicos that are generally known for using moves requiring technical skill, particularly aerial maneuvers. Most rudos tend to be thicker-bodied in their builds than técnicos too, both to emphasize their image as bullies and to perform as more effective bases.

== History ==
Common heel behavior includes cheating to win (e.g. using the ropes for leverage while pinning or attacking with a weapon while the referee is looking away), employing dirty tactics such as blatant chokes or raking the eyes, attacking other wrestlers backstage, interfering with other wrestlers' matches, insulting the fans or city they are in (referred to as "cheap heat") and acting in a haughty or superior manner.

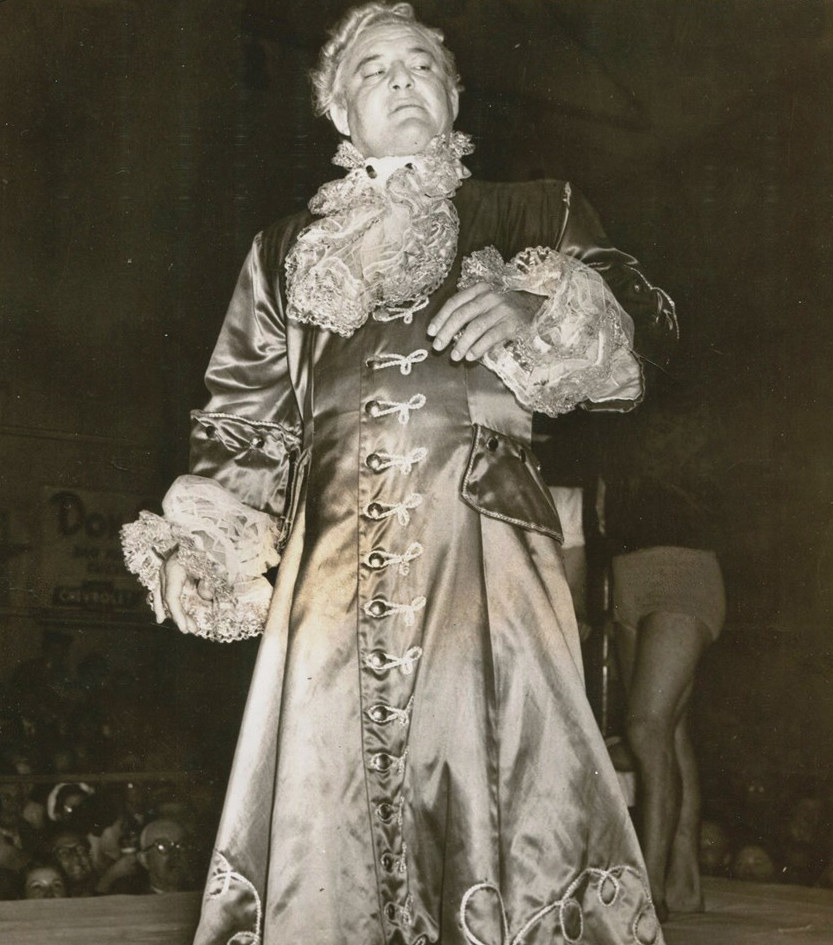
With his flamboyant gimmick, Gorgeous George became one of the most famous wrestlers of his era.

More theatrical heels would feature dramatic outfits giving off a nasty or otherwise dangerous look, such as wearing corpse paint over their faces, putting on demonic masks, covering themselves in dark leather and the like. Gorgeous George is generally regarded as one of the first to implement a gimmick, let alone a "heel" gimmick, in professional wrestling. Starting in the 1940s, he invented an extravagant, flamboyant "pretty boy" gimmick who wore wavy blonde hair, colorful robes and ritzy outfits, and was accompanied by beautiful valets to the ring for his matches. The crowd widely jeered his persona, and came out to his matches in hopes of seeing him defeated. George relished this attention, and exploded into one of the most famous (and hated) heels not only of his era, but of all time. Another example of a dramatic heel is the wrestler The Undertaker, who, on many occasions throughout his career, has switched between portraying a heel or a face. During his period as the leader of The Ministry of Darkness, he appeared as a priest of the occult in a hooded black robe and literally sat in a throne, often in the shape of the symbol used to represent him.

Occasionally, faces who have recently turned from being heels still exhibit characteristics from their heel persona. This occurs due to fans being entertained by a wrestler despite (or because of) their heel persona, often due to the performer's charisma or charm in playing the role. Certain wrestlers such as Eddie Guerrero and Ric Flair gained popularity as faces by using tactics that would typically be associated with heels, while others like Stone Cold Steve Austin, Scott Hall and more recently Becky Lynch displayed heelish behavior during their careers yet got big face reactions, leading them to be marketed as antiheroes.

On other occasions, professional wrestlers who are positioned as faces receive a negative audience reaction despite their portrayal as heroes. An example is Roman Reigns, who in 2018 was a top face in WWE, but got booed in his matches while his opponents got cheered regardless of their status as face or heel, due to perceived favoritism from WWE executives and a lack of character development. Such characters often (but not always) become nudged into becoming villains over time or retooled to present a different public image, such as The Rock's turn from a clean-cut face to self-absorbed narcissist in the Nation of Domination heel stable, or Tetsuya Naito's fan rejection of his babyface causing him to drastically form Los Ingobernables de Japon. The term "heel" does not, in itself, describe a typical set of attributes or audience reaction, but simply a wrestler's presentation and booking as an antagonist.

Depending on the angle, heels can act cowardly or overpowering to their opponents. For instance, a "closet champion" in particular is a term for a heel in possession of a title belt who consistently dodges top flight competition and attempts to back down from challenges. Examples include Seth Rollins during his first WWE World Heavyweight Championship reign, Charlotte during her Divas/Raw Women's Championship reign, the Honky Tonk Man during his long Intercontinental Championship reign, Tommaso Ciampa during his NXT Championship reign and The IIconics during their WWE Women's Tag Team Championship reign. Brock Lesnar's character in WWE had heel aspects, and was well known for failing to regularly defend his title (especially during his first Universal Championship reign), often only performing on pay-per-view events and not on SmackDown or especially Raw as he was only on a part-time appearance contract with WWE. This sort of behavior supports the intended kayfabe opinion that the face (or faces) the heel is feuding with is actually more deserving of the title than the title-holding heel is. Heels may beg for mercy during a beat down at the hands of faces, even if they have delivered similar beat downs with no mercy. Ric Flair in particular has been well known for begging an opponent off, then hitting a low blow on his distracted opponent. Other heels may act overpowering to their opponents to play up the scrappy underdog success story for the face.

== Gallery of famous heels ==
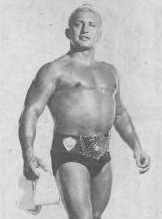
Buddy Rogers

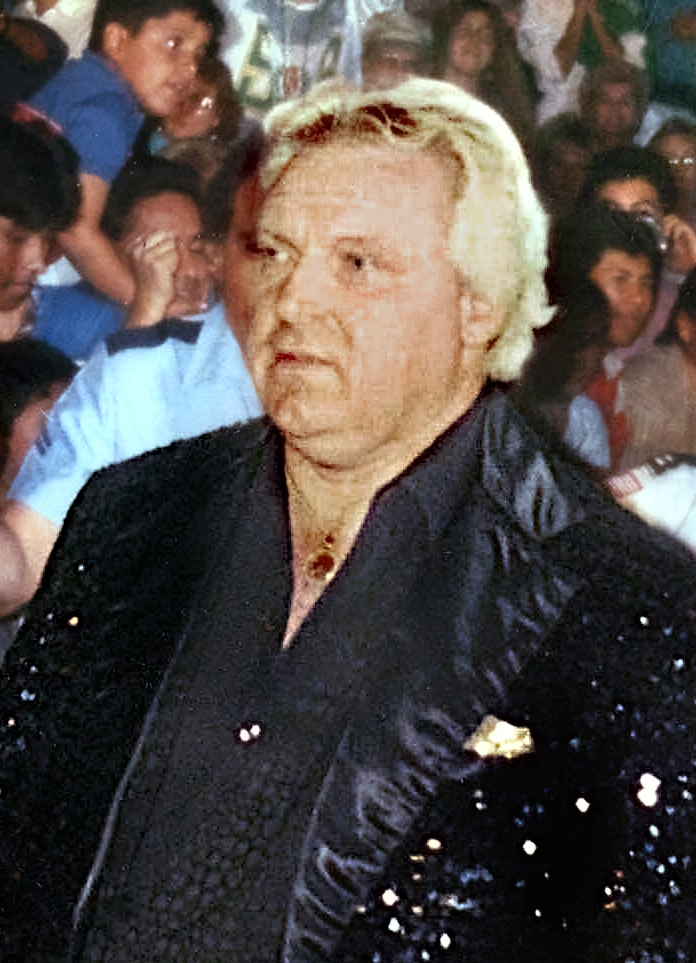
Bobby Heenan

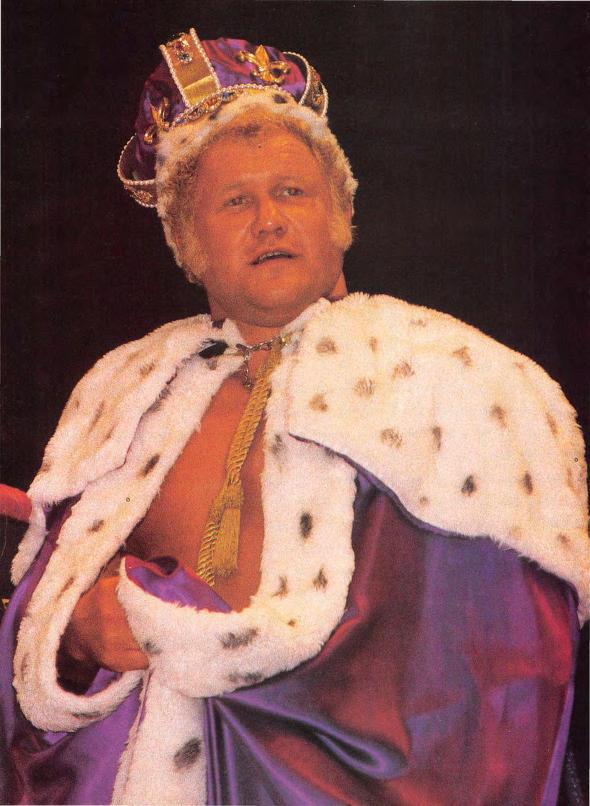
Harley Race

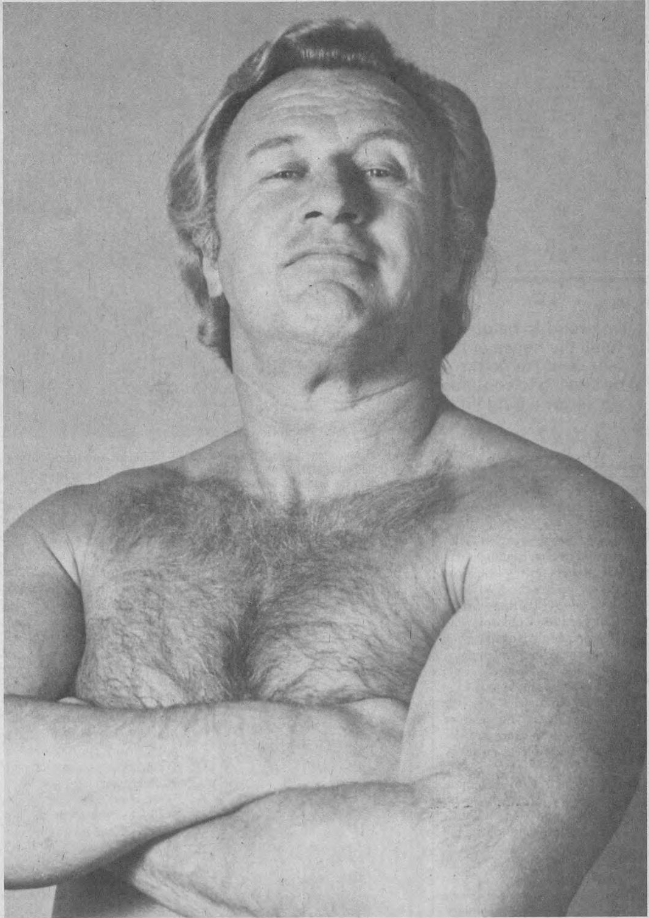
Nick Bockwinkel

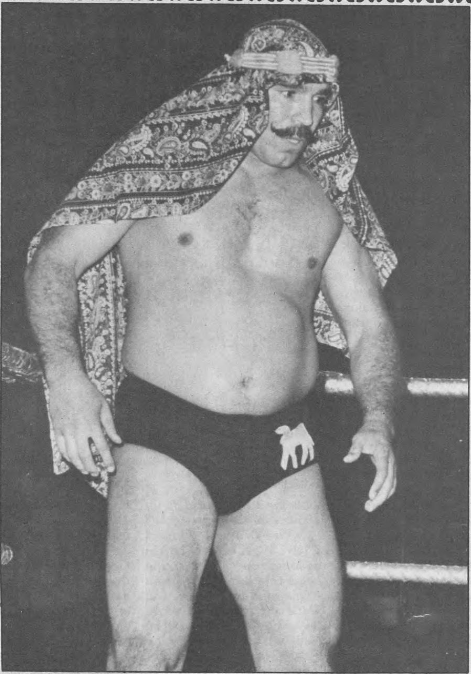
The Iron Sheik

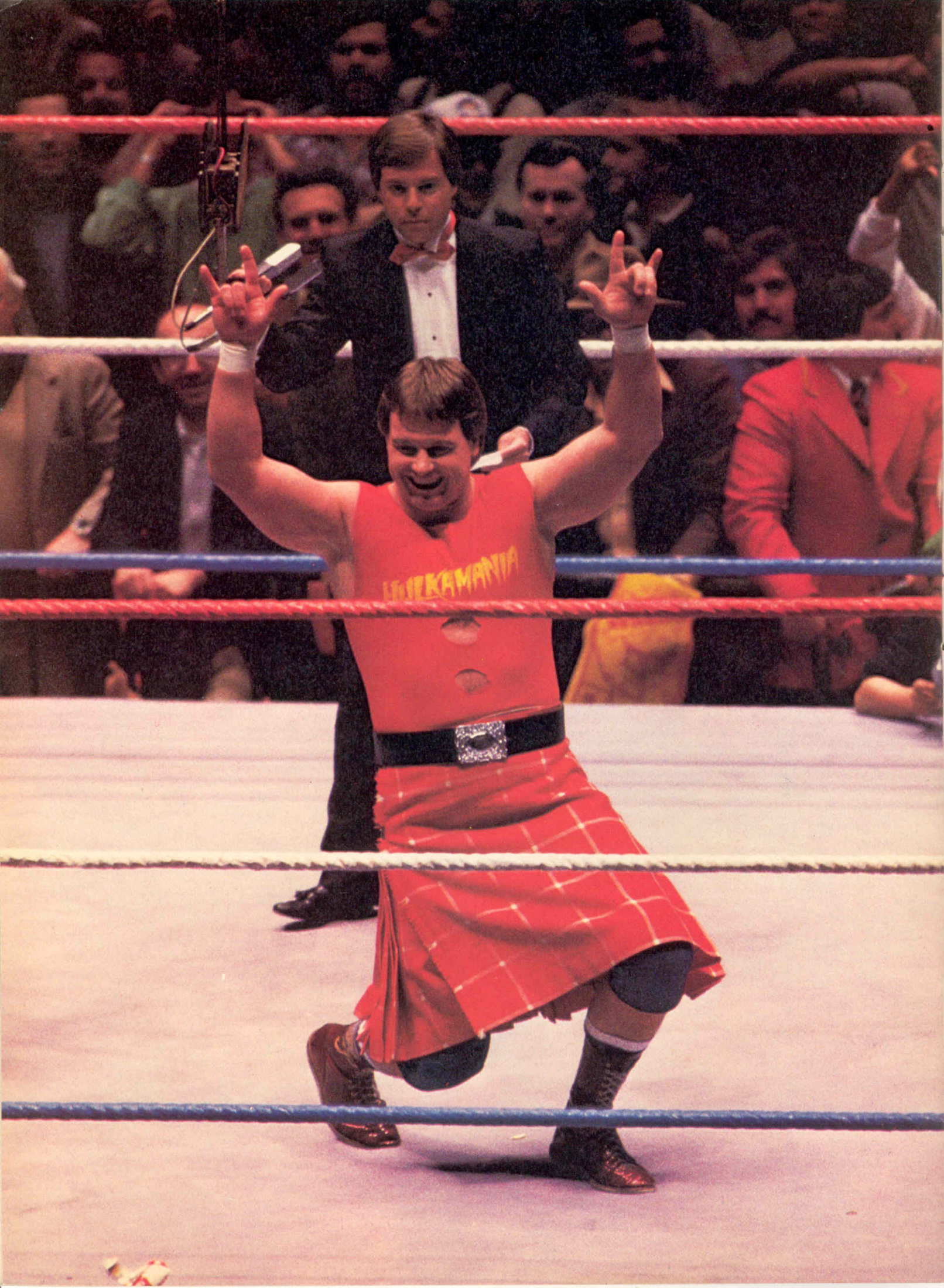
Roddy Piper

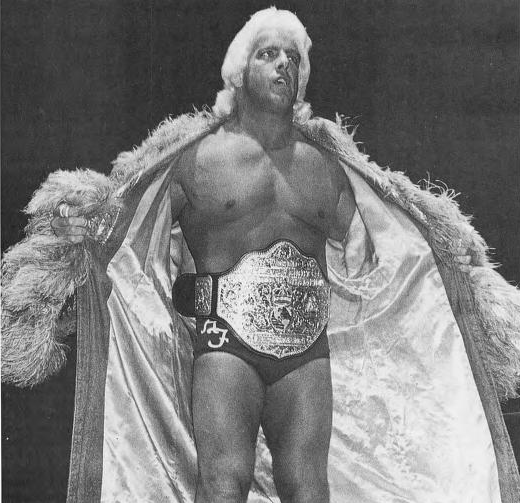
Ric Flair

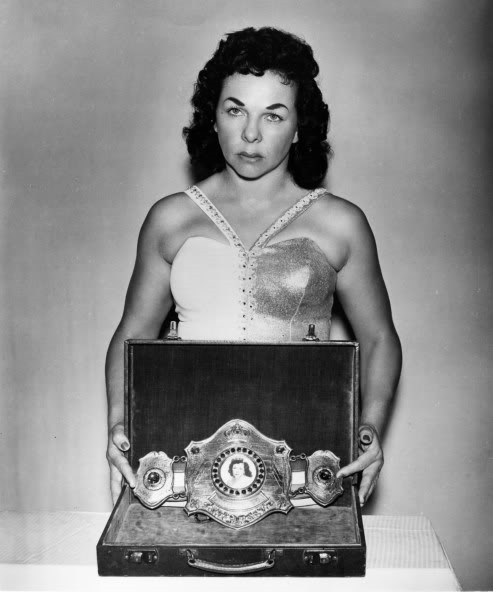
The Fabulous Moolah

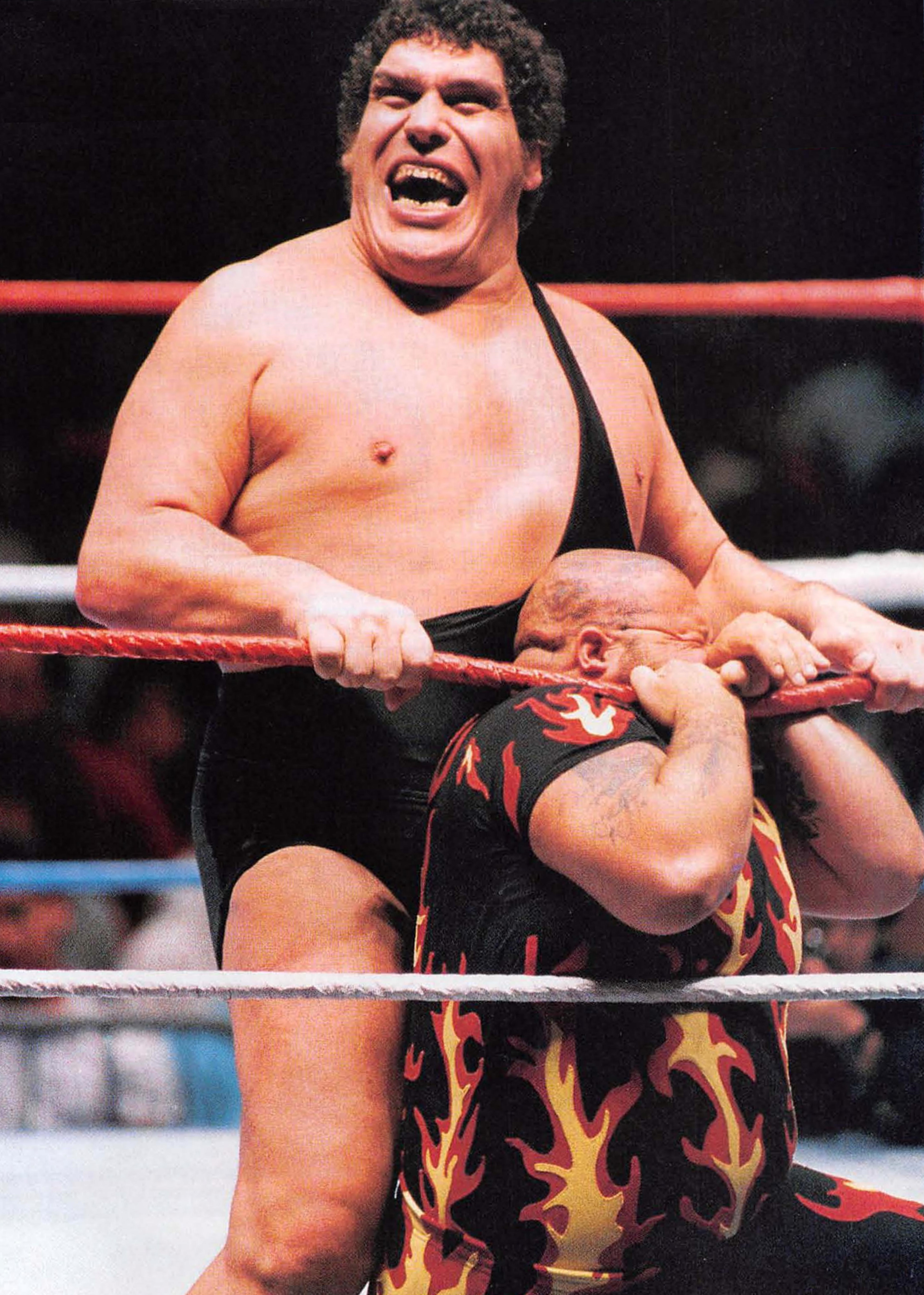
André the Giant

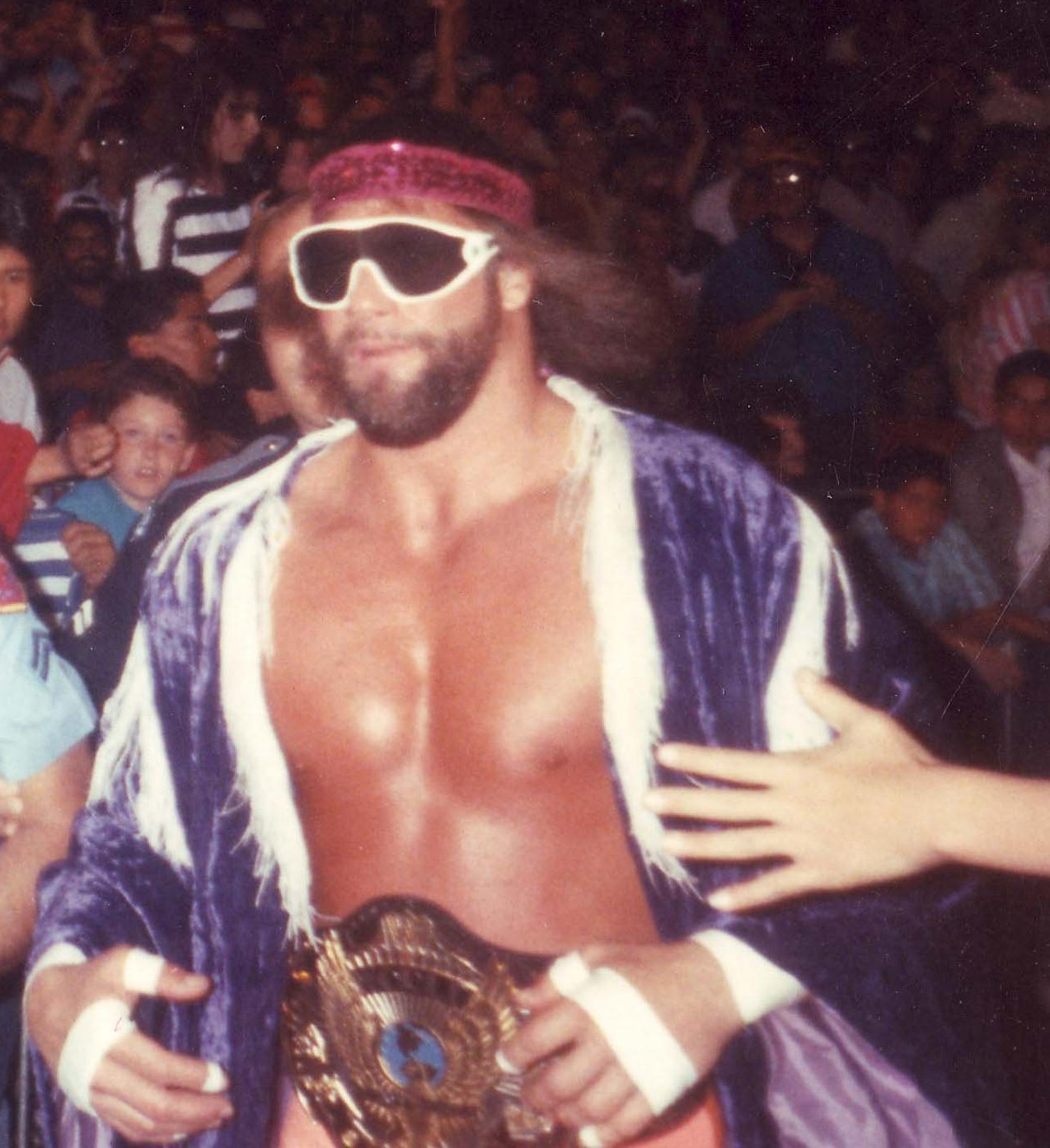
Randy Savage

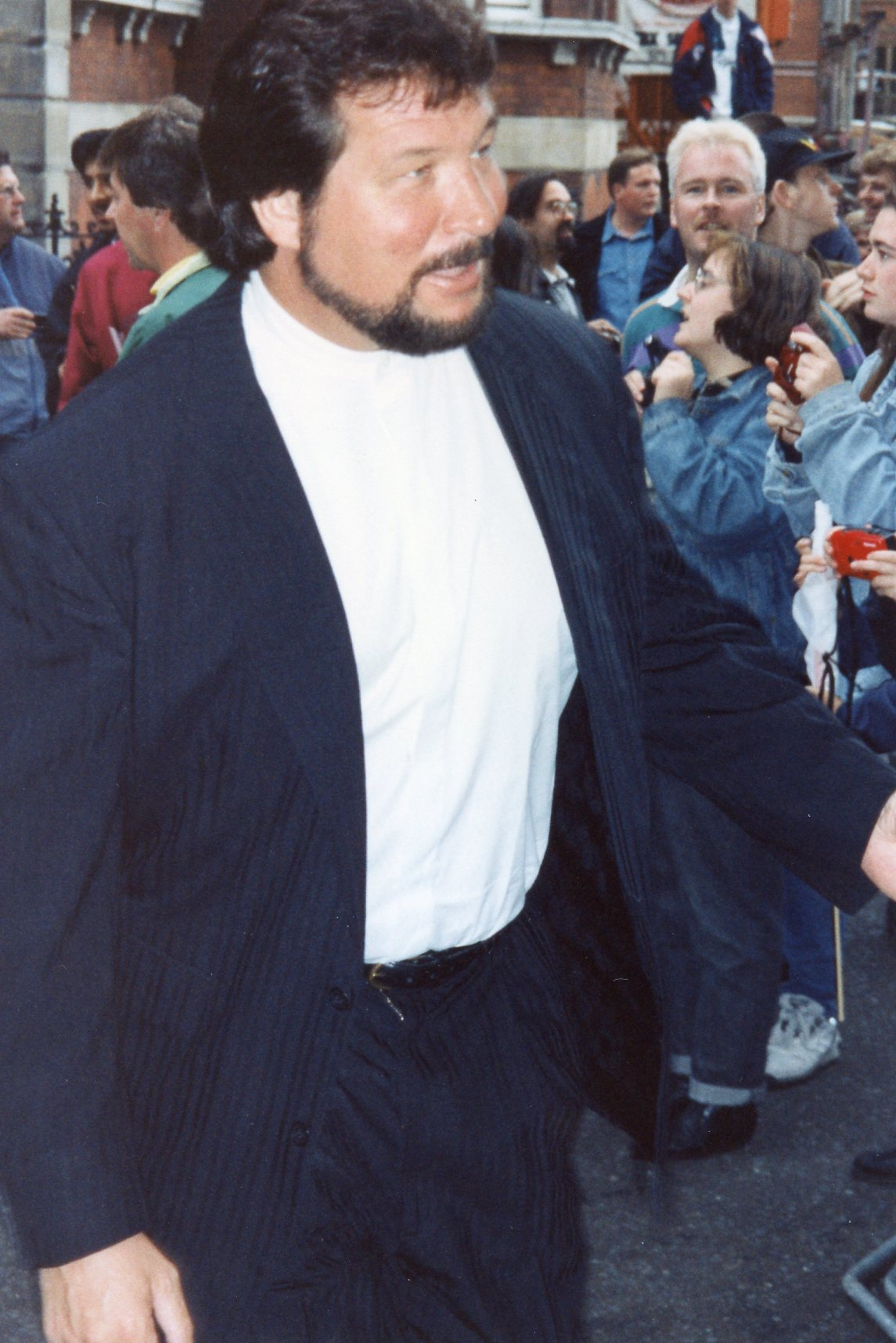
Ted DiBiase

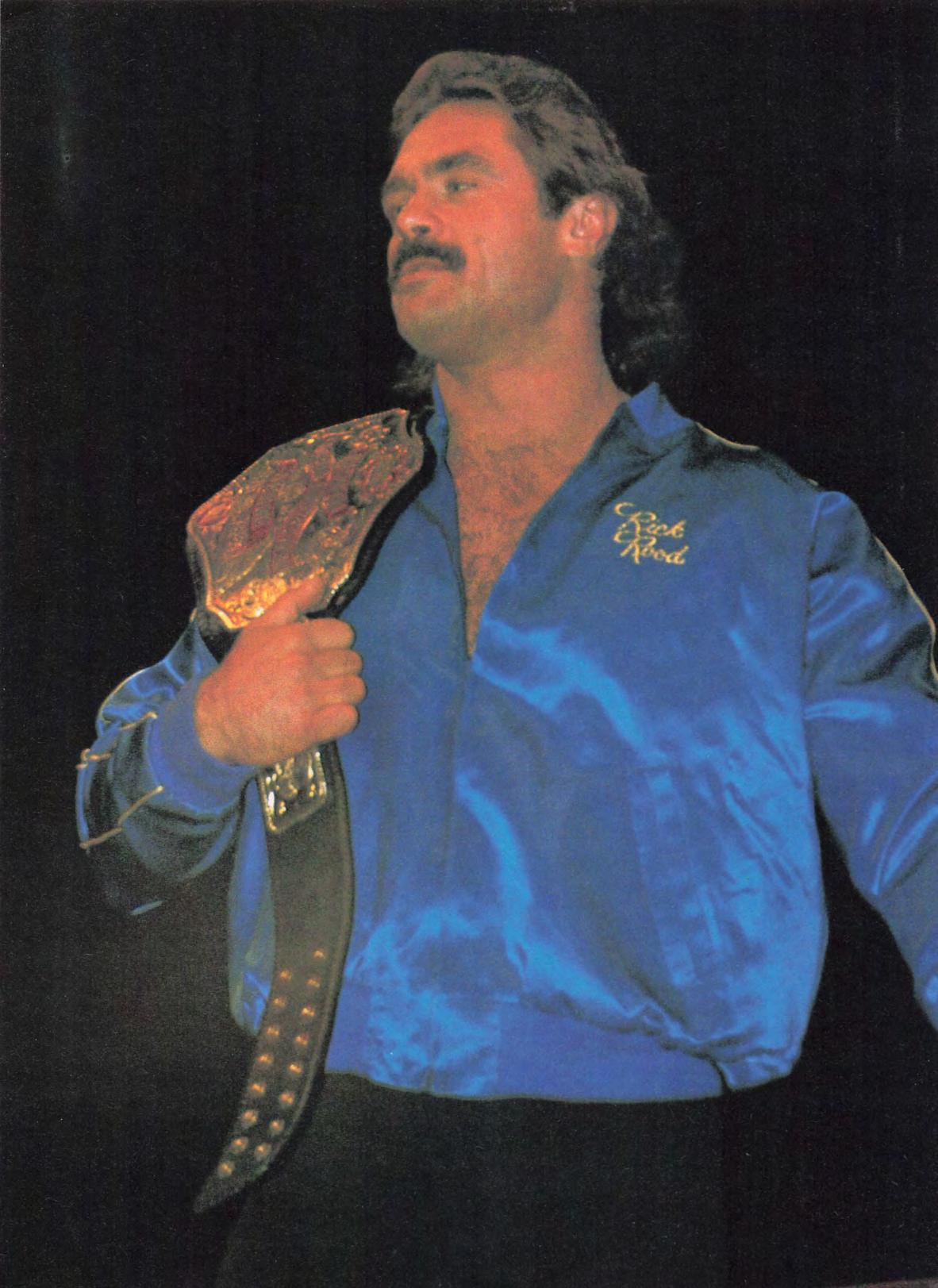
Rick Rude

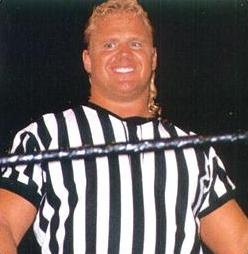
Curt Hennig

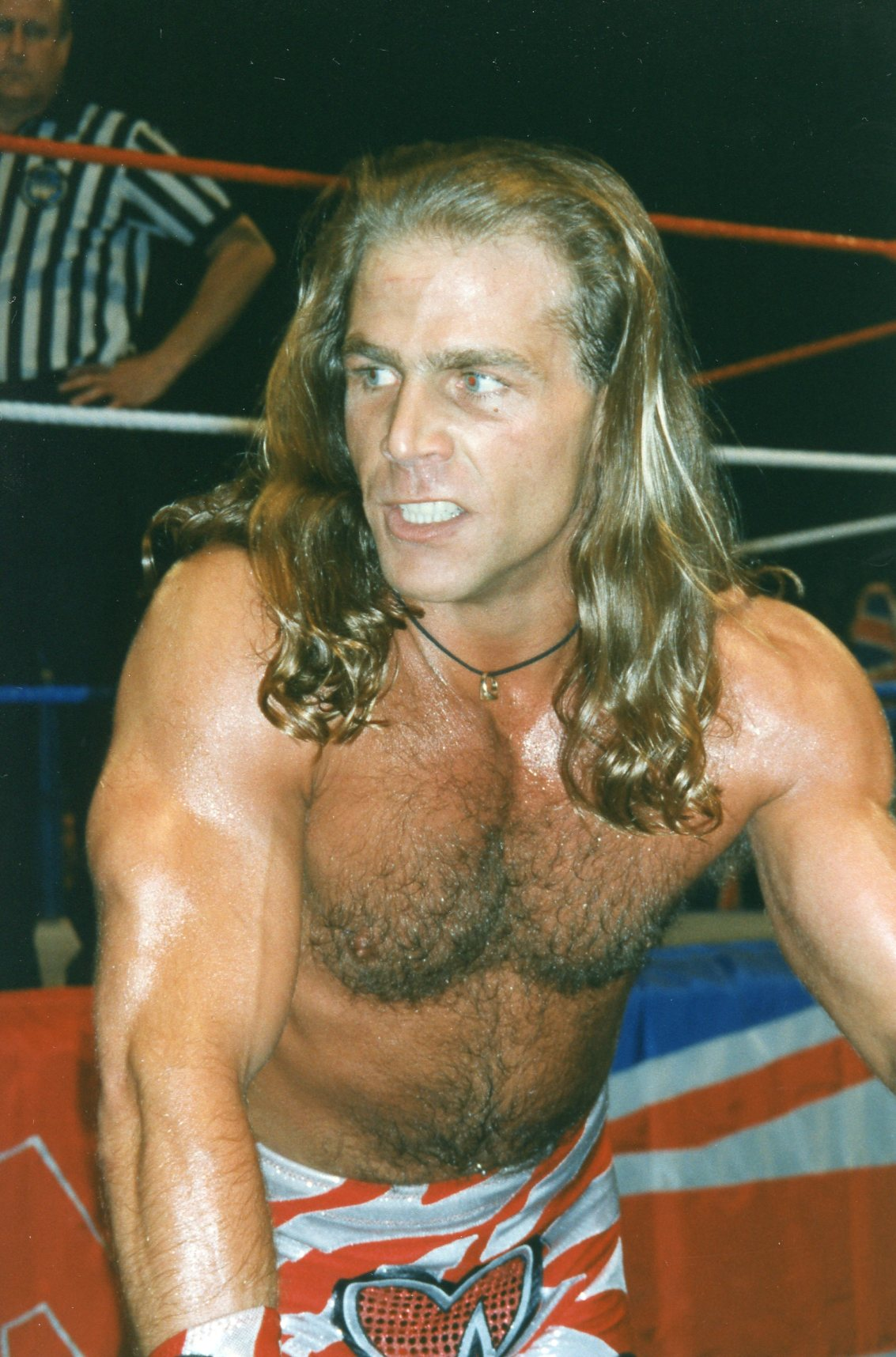
Shawn Michaels

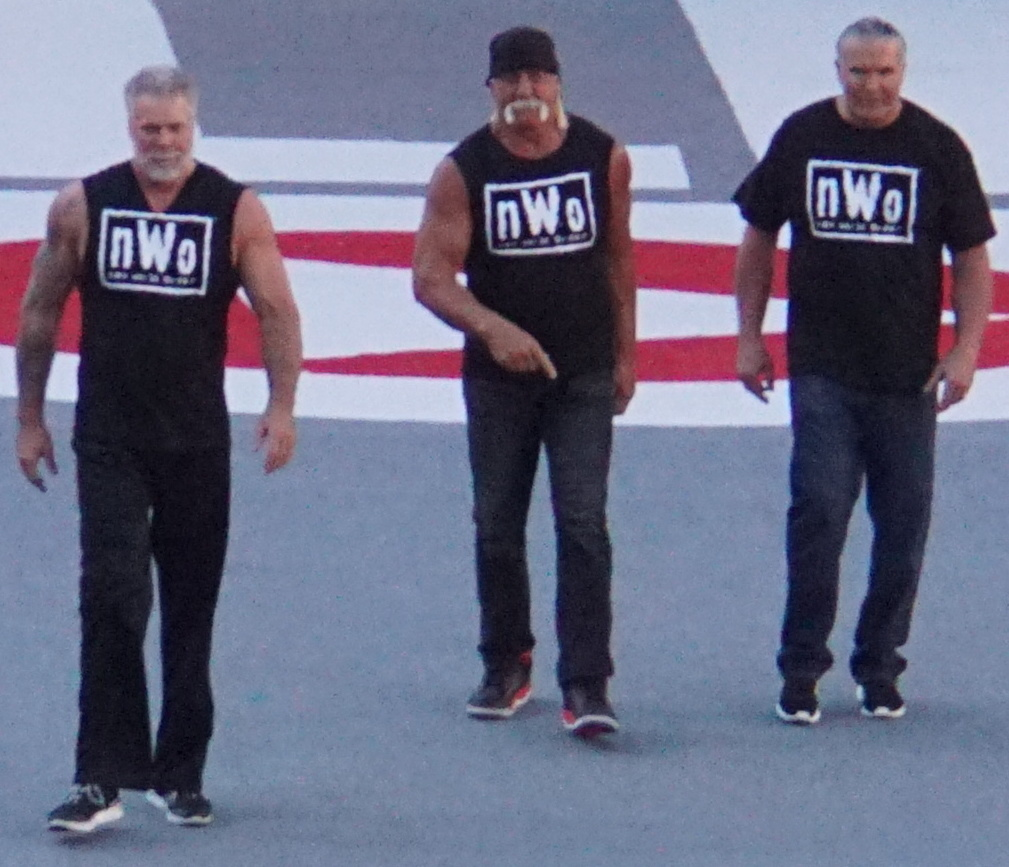
Kevin Nash, Scott Hall and Hollywood Hogan

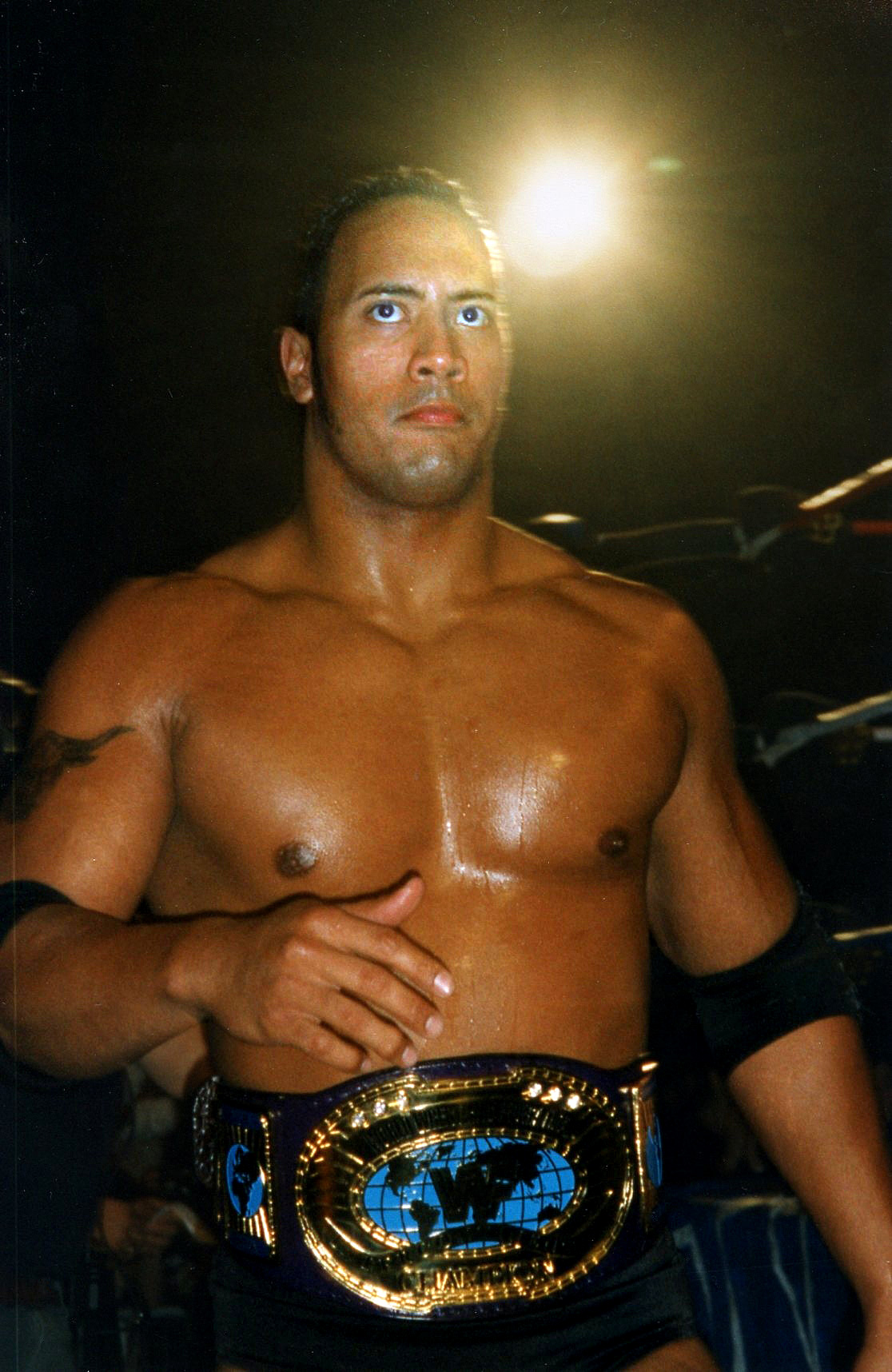
The Rock

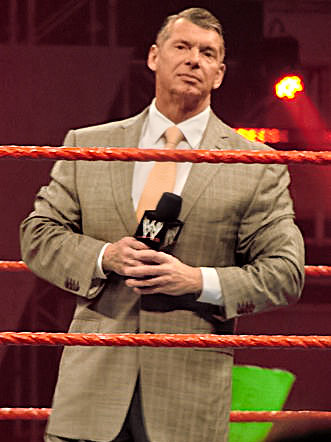
Mr. McMahon

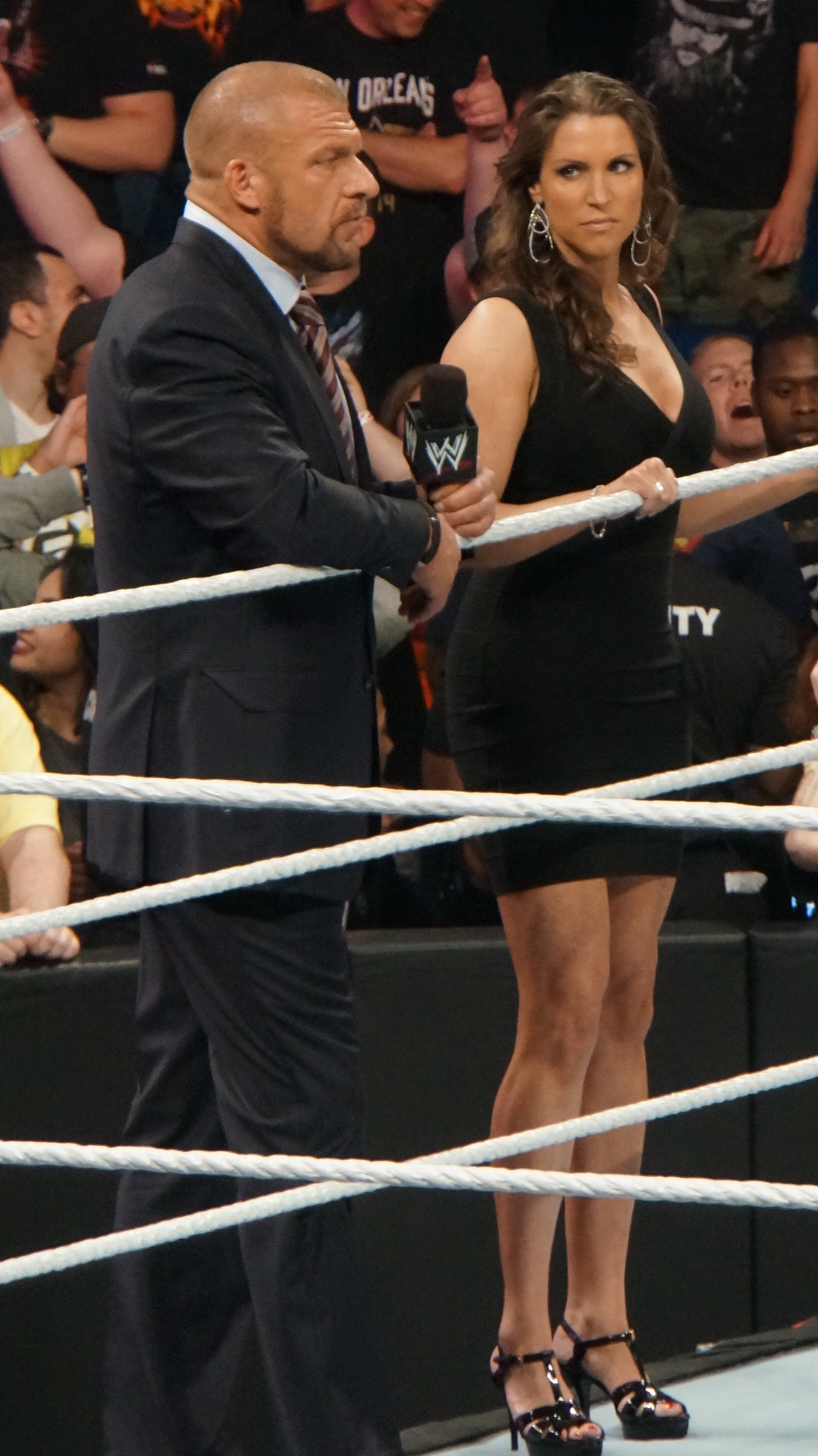
Triple H and Stephanie McMahon

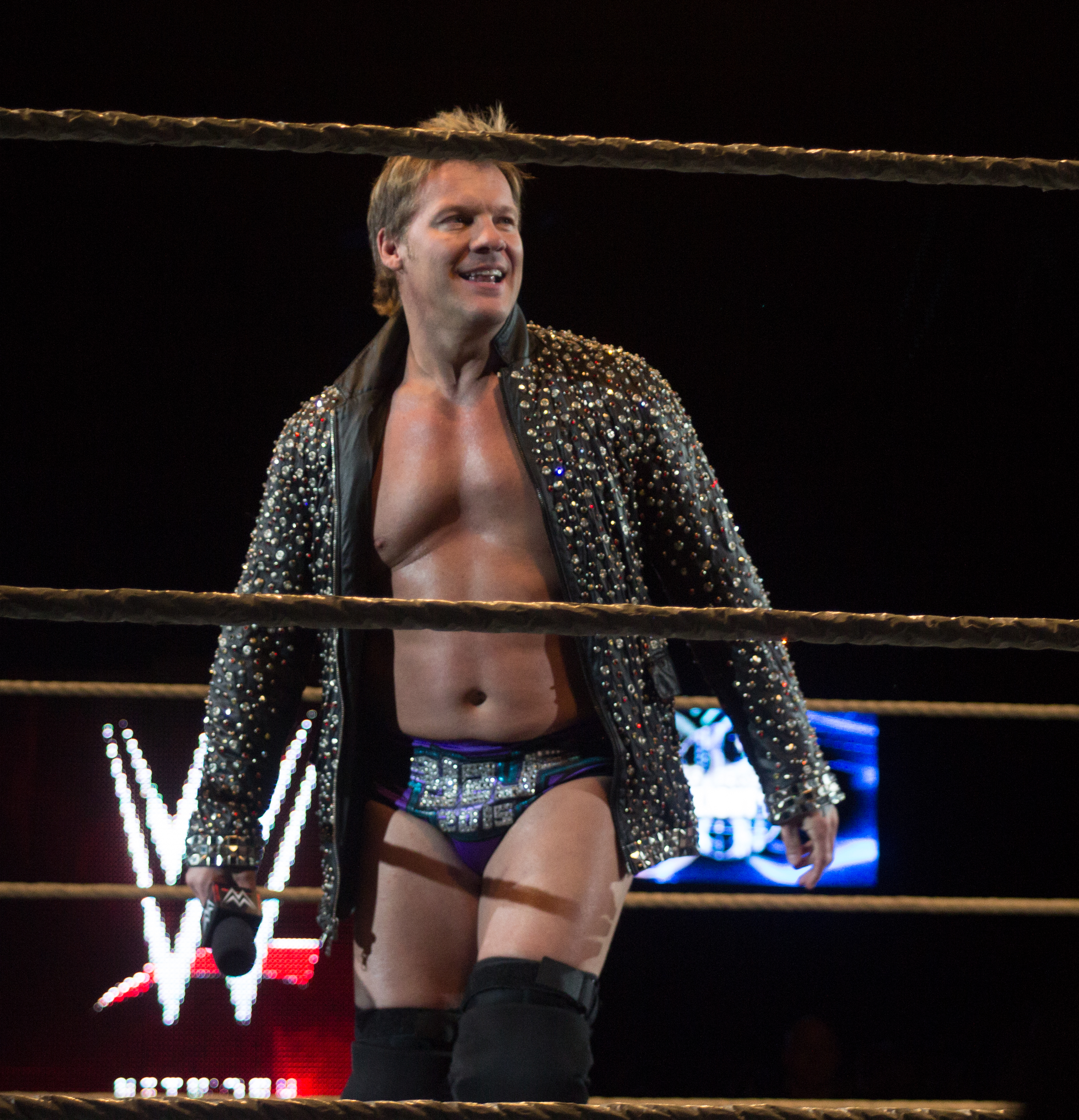
Chris Jericho

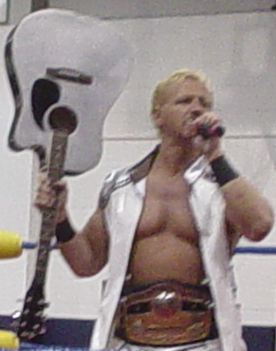
Jeff Jarrett

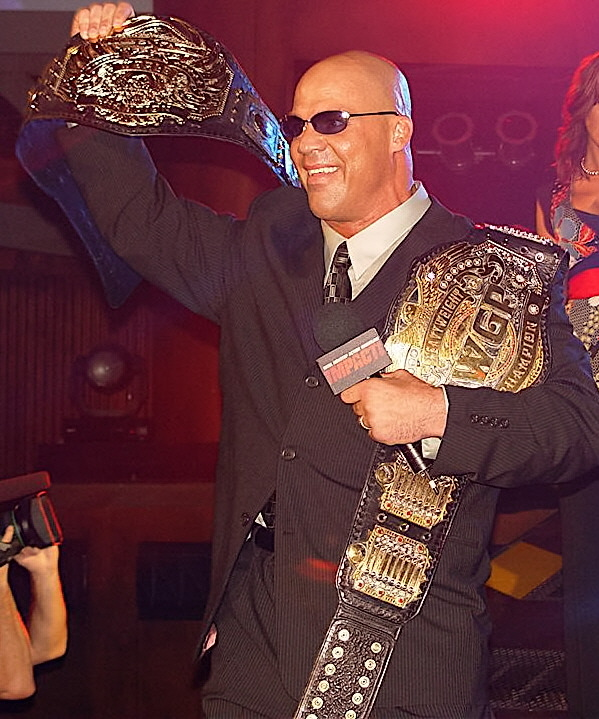
Kurt Angle

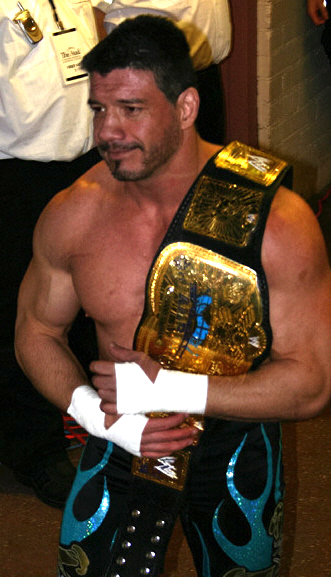
Eddie Guerrero

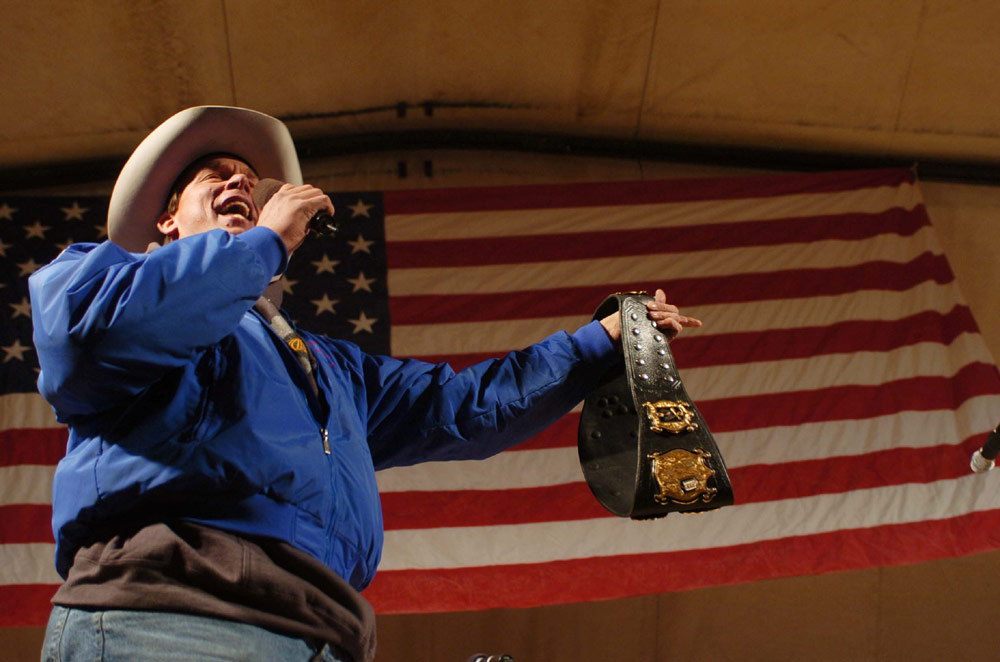
John "Bradshaw" Layfield (JBL)

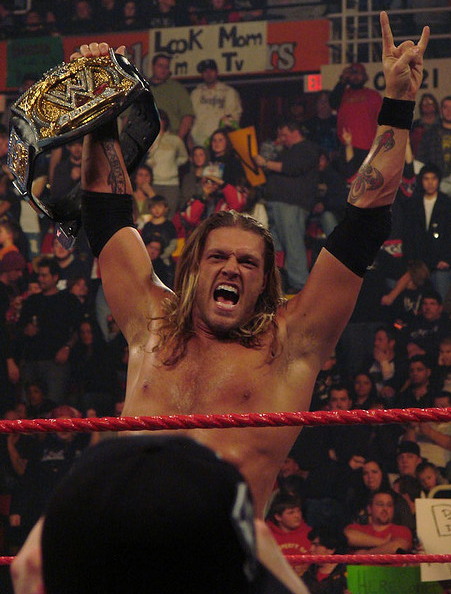
Edge

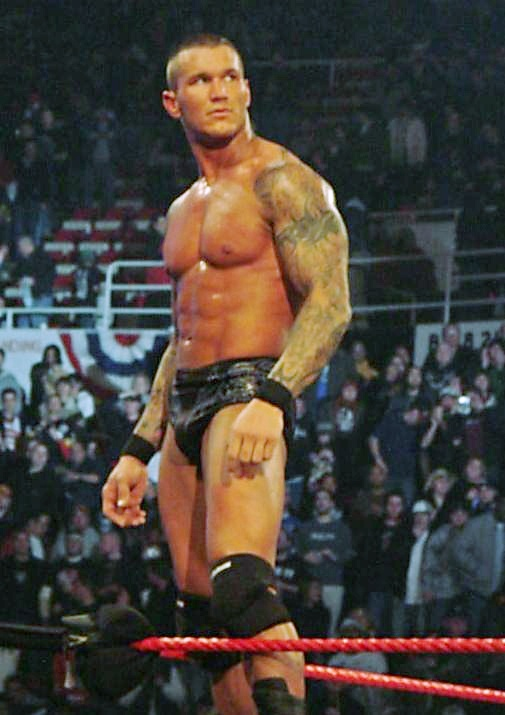
Randy Orton

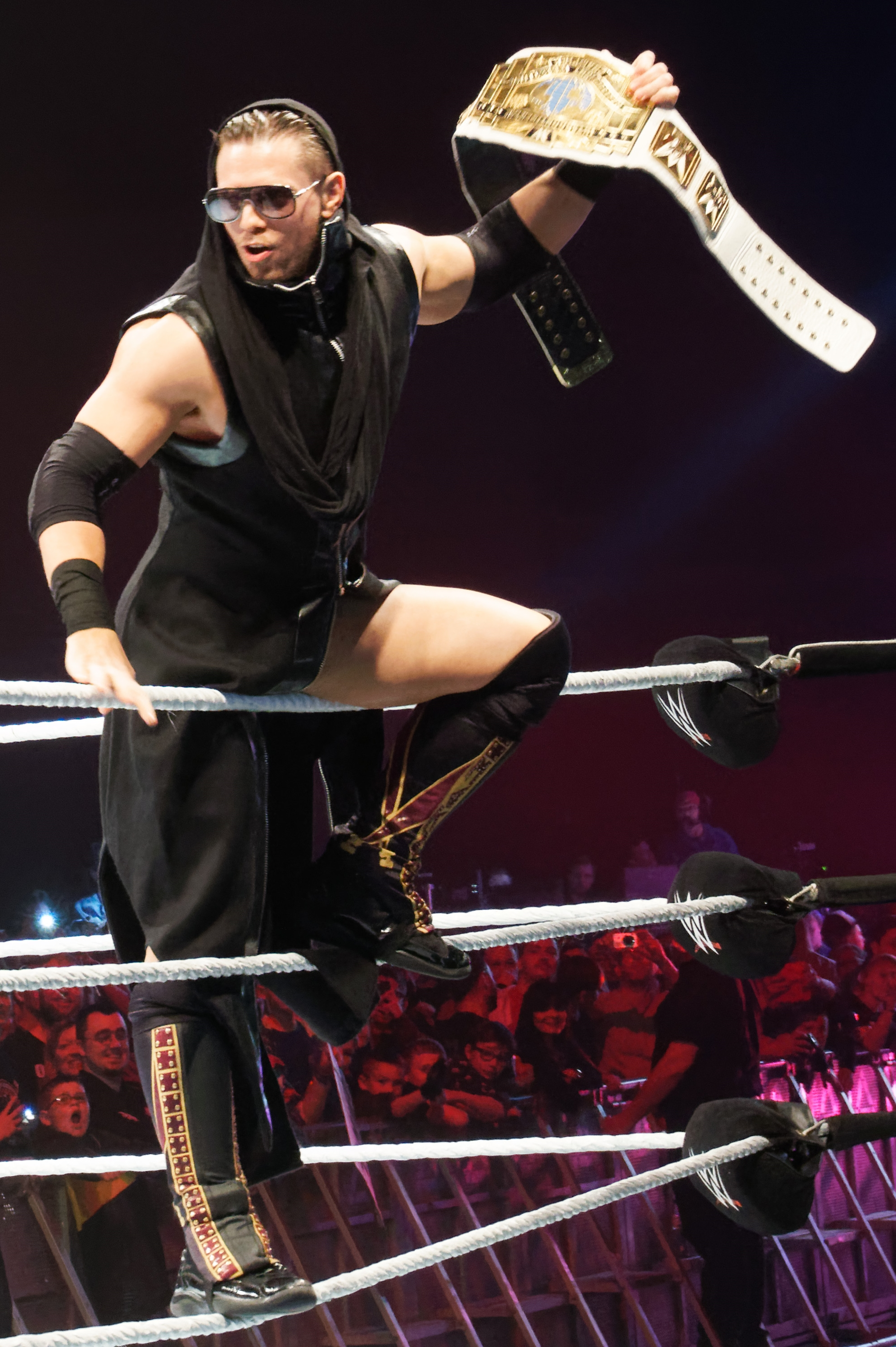
The Miz

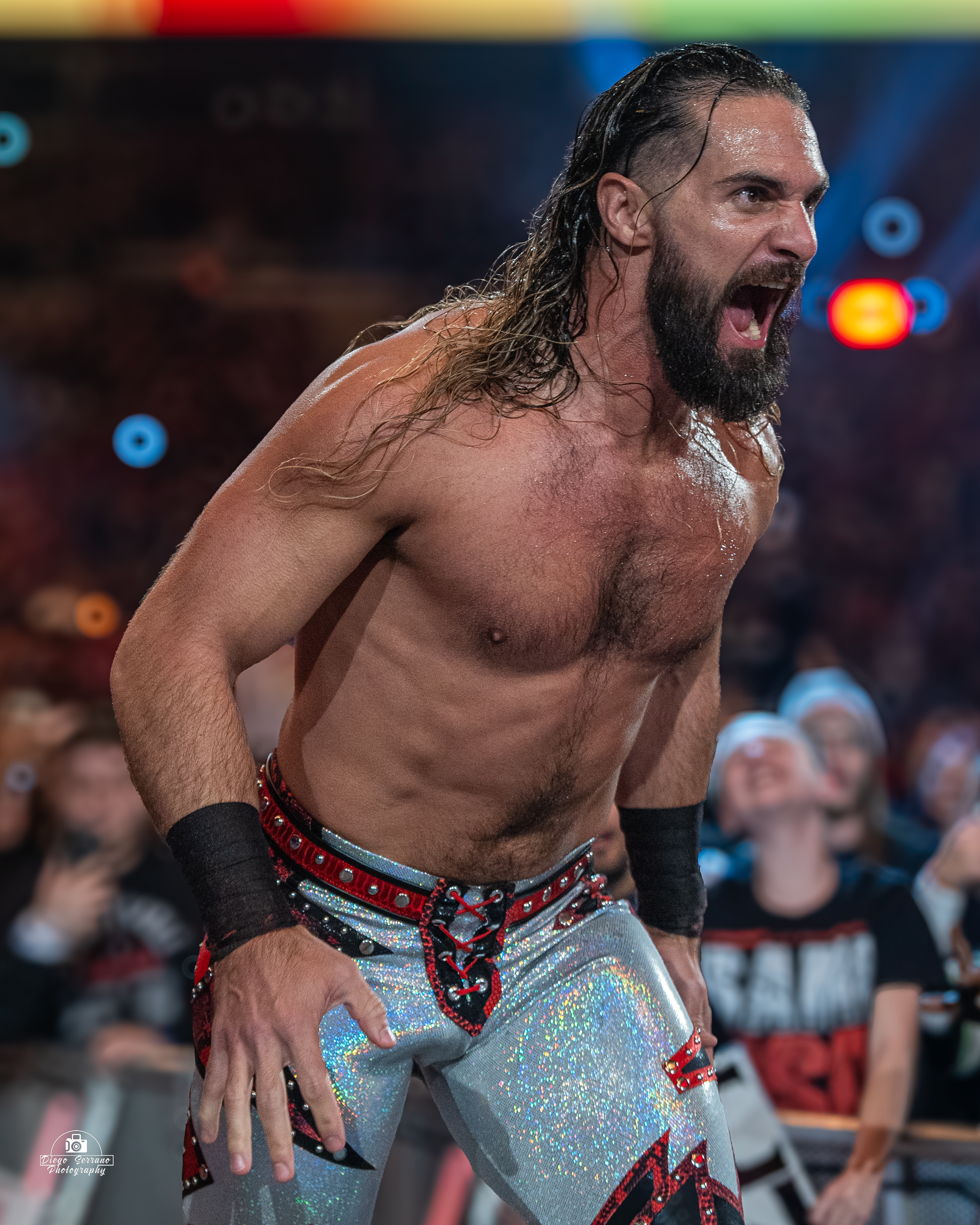
Seth Rollins

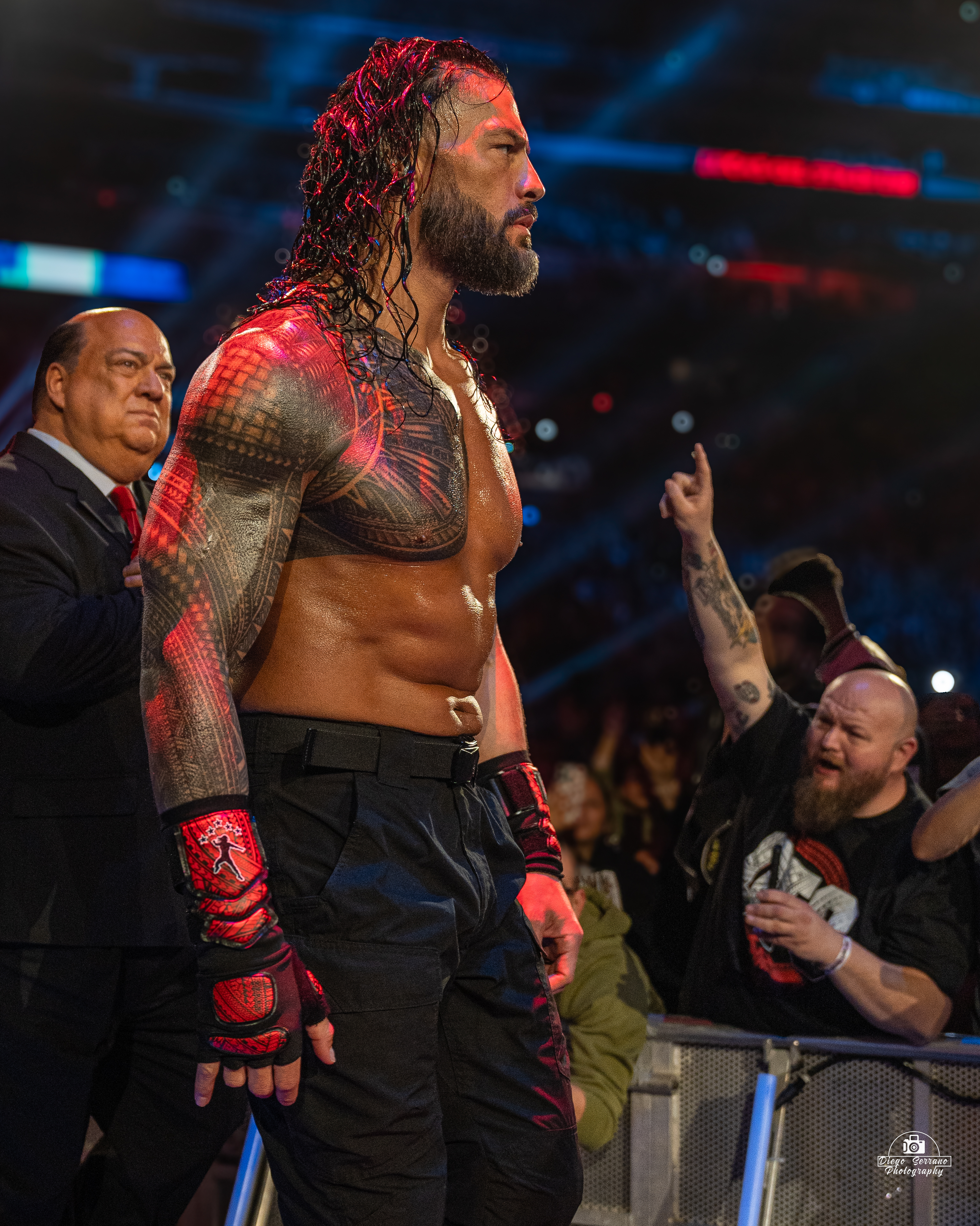
Roman Reigns with Paul Heyman

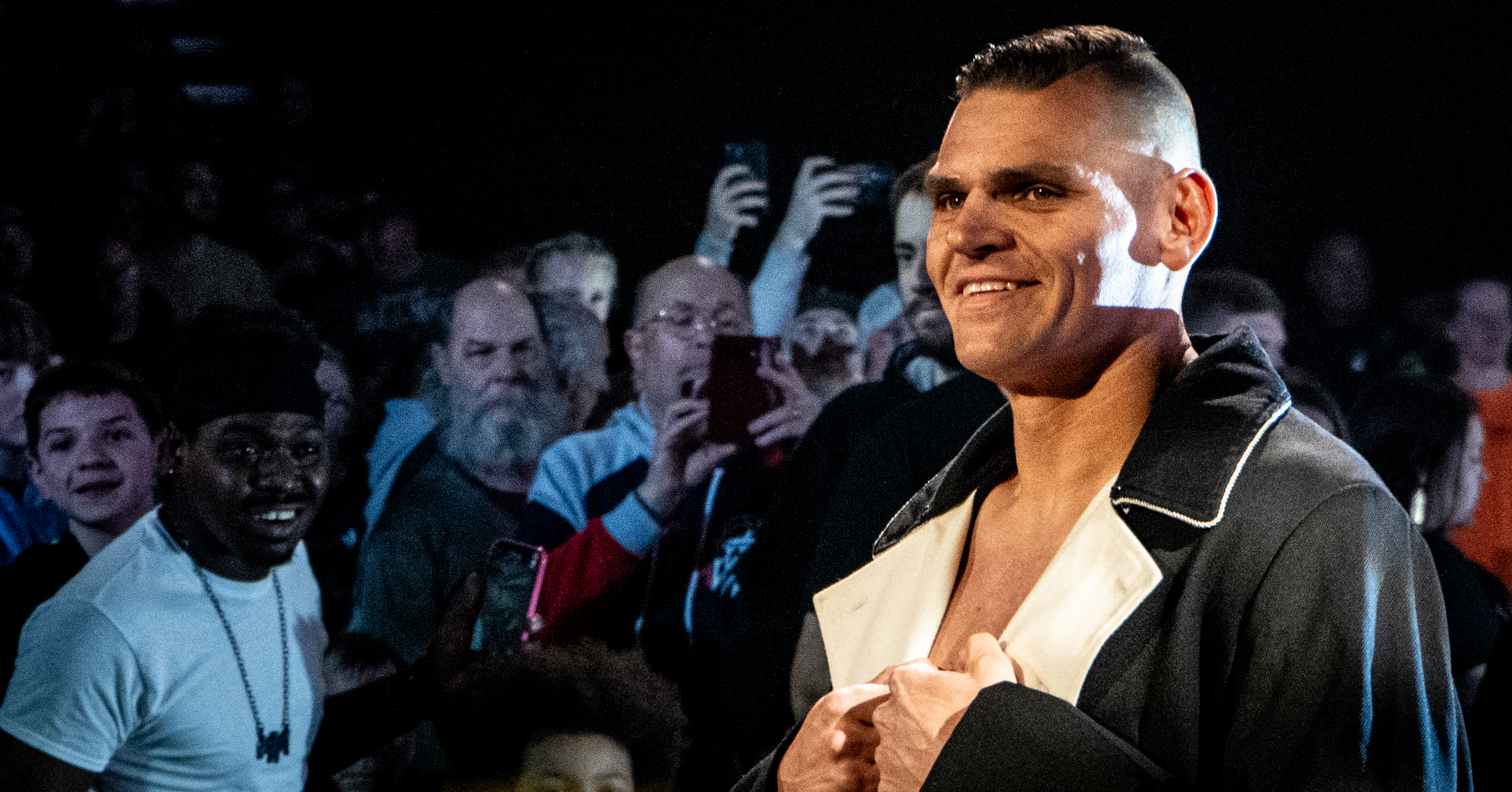
Gunther

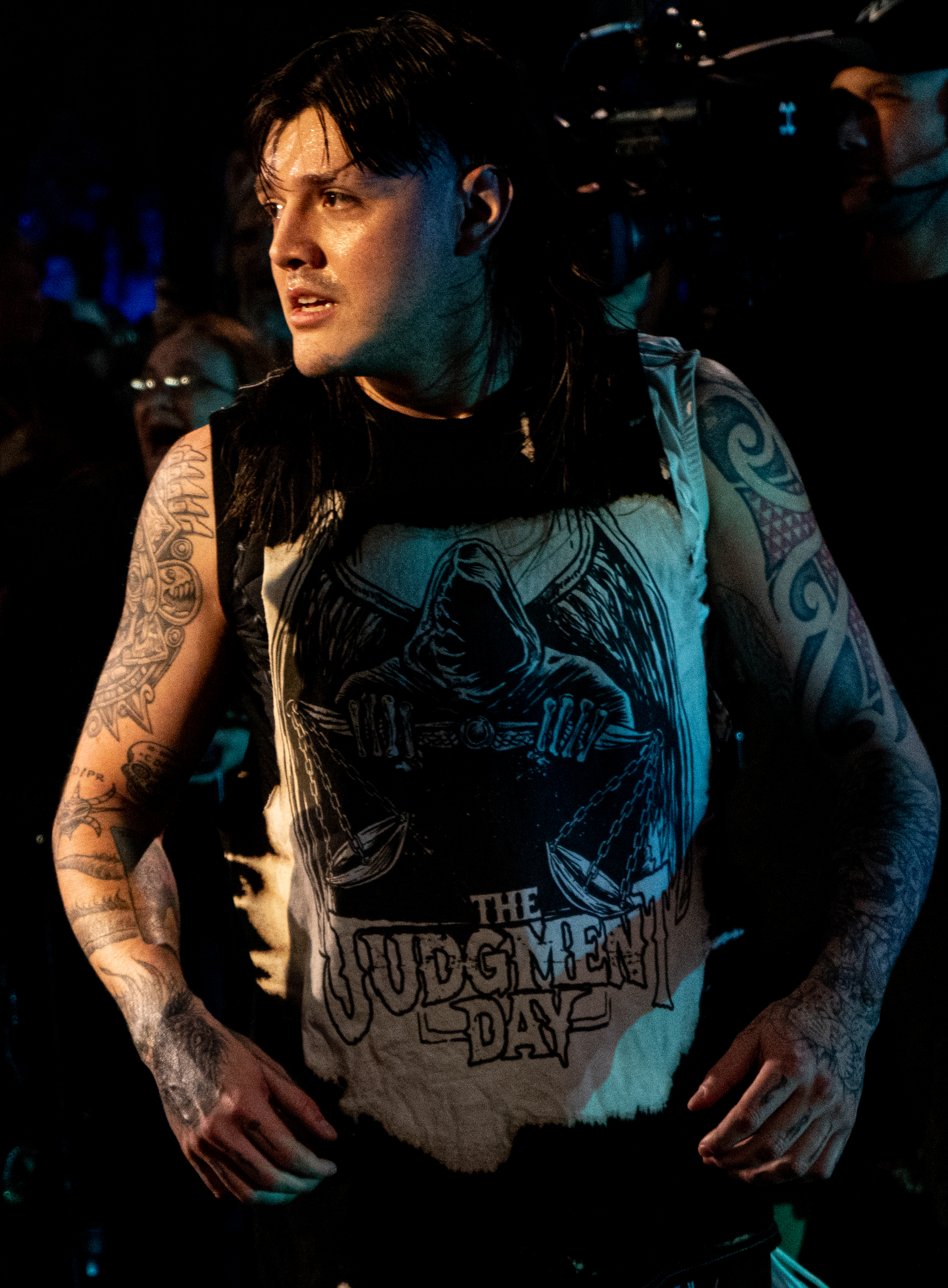
Dominik Mysterio

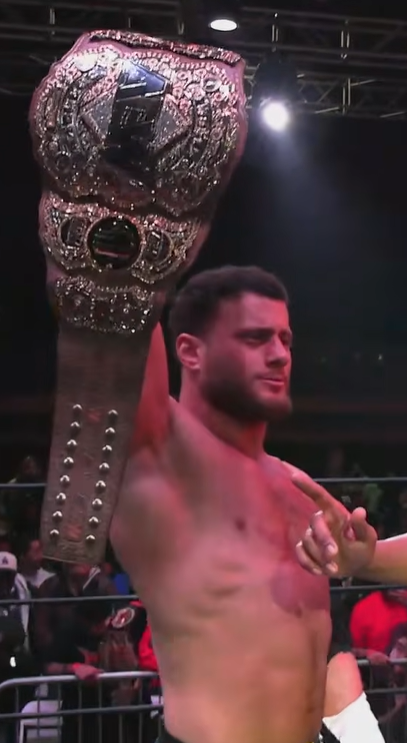
Maxwell Jacob Friedman (MJF)
