= Dave Meltzer =

American wrestling historian (born 1959)

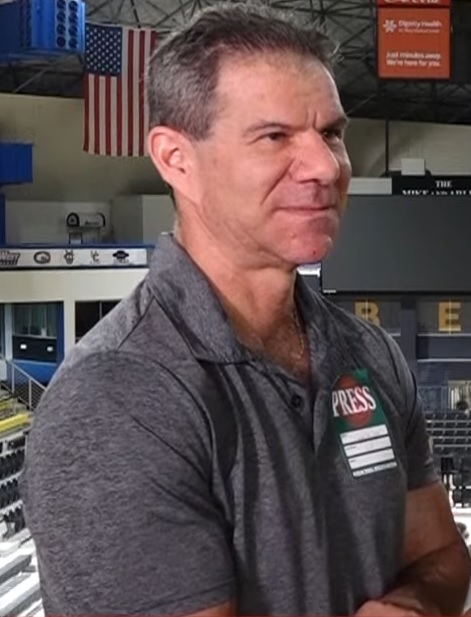
- Meltzer in 2018
- Born: David Allen Meltzer; October 24, 1959 (age 67); New York City, U.S.
- Occupations: Journalist; author; historian
- Years active: 1971–present
- Children: 2
- Website: f4wonline.com

David Allen Meltzer (born October 24, 1959) is an American journalist, author and historian who reports on professional wrestling and mixed martial arts. Since 1983, he has been the publisher and editor of the Wrestling Observer Newsletter (WON), a dirtsheet primarily addressing professional wrestling. He has also written for the Oakland Tribune, the Los Angeles Times, Yahoo! Sports, SI.com, and The National Sports Daily. He has extensively covered mixed martial arts since UFC 1 in 1993 and also covers it for SB Nation. He has been called "the most accomplished reporter in sports journalism" by Frank Deford of Sports Illustrated.

== Early life ==
David Allen Meltzer was born into a Jewish family in Upstate New York on October 24, 1959. He later moved with his family to San Jose, California. He earned a journalism degree from San Jose State University and started out as a sportswriter for the Wichita Falls Times Record News and the Turlock Journal. He demonstrated an interest in professional wrestling and a journalistic approach to it early in life, writing several wrestling-related publications that predate WON, dating back to 1971. The most notable of these was the California Wrestling Report c. 1973–1974, which reported on the National Wrestling Alliance territories operating out of Los Angeles and San Francisco.

== Career ==
The beginnings of the Wrestling Observer Newsletter date back to 1980, when Meltzer began an annual poll among those with whom he corresponded about professional wrestling. According to Meltzer, he was just a fan at first. A short time later, he began maintaining a tape-trading list, and would occasionally send match results and news updates along with tape updates. He stated that he wanted to keep his friends in college "in the loop" for his tape trading and happenings in the business, as the mainstream wrestling magazines catered to a somewhat younger demographic.

In 2012, the owner of the mixed martial arts promotion Ultimate Fighting Championship, Dana White, responded publicly to an analysis by Meltzer regarding the television ratings for UFC on Fox 3, which aired on May 5, 2012. Meltzer described the broadcast as "a genuine XFL caliber ratings disaster". White replied in a video statement disputing the characterization, asserting that the event ranked first in key male demographics and that the main event ranked first across all male demographic categories. He attributed the lower overall viewership in part to a reported decline of approximately 10 million television viewers across broadcast television at the time. White also belitted Meltzer by referencing Meltzer's departure from Yahoo! Sports.

In May 2015, Meltzer reported that Destination America had decided to cancel Impact Wrestling by late September. Total Nonstop Action Wrestling vehemently denied the reports, claiming that they "constitute[d] defamation" and that they were "seek[ing] all legal remedies available". Nevertheless, the show was cancelled by January 2016 and no legal matters ever arose.

In 2016, Sports Illustrated called Meltzer a reliable source for MMA PPV numbers in an era when the UFC did not publicly release that information. In September 2017, the editor of Sherdog, Jordan Breen, stated "buy-rate estimates in the MMA sphere are almost wholly reliant on the reporting of Dave Meltzer" while praising Meltzer as one of the best active sports journalists of the era. In October 2017, MMAweekly.com stated "The UFC doesn't release its PPV numbers, but industry insider Dave Meltzer is largely credited with acquiring the most accurate estimates for how the fight promotion’s PPV buys perform".

Meltzer, somewhat indirectly, helped to usher in a new era of wrestling in the late 2010s; a Twitter user asked him in 2017 if an independent wrestling event could sell at least 10,000 tickets, a number that no company besides WCW and WWE had reached for a professional wrestling show in the U.S. since 1993. He responded with "not any time soon", prompting wrestler Cody Rhodes—who had left WWE the previous year—to say he would "take that bet". Rhodes and the tag team The Young Bucks subsequently promoted the 2018 independent show All In, which gained an attendance of 11,263; this led Rhodes and the Bucks to sign up as wrestlers and executive vice presidents for All Elite Wrestling (AEW), a wrestling promotion created by Tony Khan in 2019 that would grow to become the second largest American promotion after WWE.

In the 2020s, Meltzer participated in HBO's documentary about André the Giant and appeared on several episodes of Vice's series Dark Side of the Ring.

In March 2025, Meltzer reported in a now-deleted WON article that matches involving WWE ID talent were directly booked and scripted by the program's head scout and WWE Evolve booker Gabe Sapolsky; in exchange, promotions would be permitted to use WWE branding to advertise the matches and talent would be paid a stipend to wrestle the matches. In response to the article, Game Changer Wrestling promoter Brett Lauderdale denied the existence of any such scripts or stipends, but acknowledged they were permitted (but not required) to use WWE branding.

== Legacy ==
In 2016, the Washington Post referred to Meltzer as "pro wrestling's preeminent journalist" while Mel Magazine called him "the most important journalist in professional wrestling history" in 2022. In 2013, Frank Deford of Sports Illustrated called him "the most accomplished reporter in sports journalism" and stated, "You could cover the Vatican or State Department and not do as good a job as Dave Meltzer does on wrestling." R. Tyson Smith, a professor at University of Pennsylvania, cited Meltzer as "the foremost authority on professional wrestling in the United States" in his 2014 book Fighting for Recognition: Identity, Masculinity, and the Act of Violence in Professional Wrestling. Lowery A. Woodall III, an associate professor at Millersville University of Pennsylvania, called Meltzer "the most respected wrestling journalist of the last forty years" in 2022. Wrestling historian Pat Laprade has called WON the "Wall Street Journal of professional wrestling".

Bret Hart recalled that, during his career, most of his colleagues were keen to be featured and praised by Meltzer in the Wrestling Observer Newsletter and stated he was glad WON served as a legitimate source of news within professional wrestling following the Montreal screwjob. Seth Rollins has praised Meltzer's international coverage of professional wrestling and his ability as a wrestling historian. Terry Funk recalled being impressed by WON in his 2013 autobiography: "I immediately thought that this thing was going to take off. There would be no stopping it. Instead of talking about the matches as if they were real competitions, like the newsstand magazines had one, Dave Meltzer wrote about the business behind the scenes. It had news and results from all over, and was obviously written about someone who understood the business... I saw it as a thermometer of sorts, to see how different things were getting over in different places."

Conversely, PWInsider writer Dave Scherer has criticized Meltzer's work. After a collaboration between them in the 1990s, Scherer alleged that Meltzer fed him first-hand information before publishing something different. John Bradshaw Layfield has alleged that WWE gave Meltzer false information which Meltzer then published.

=== Star rating system and impact ===
Meltzer popularized the star rating system (devised by Jim Cornette and his childhood friend Norm M. "Weasel" Dooley), which rates matches on a nominal scale of zero to five stars in a similar manner to that used by many movie critics. The first 6 and 6.5 star matches – as rated by Dooley – took place in 1981. The highest Meltzer has ever rated a match was seven stars, given to Kazuchika Okada and Kenny Omega for their match at Dominion 6.9 in Osaka-jo Hall in June 2018. Conversely, matches that Meltzer rates particularly poorly may receive a negative star rating. The lowest rating Meltzer has given out is −459.6 stars – corresponding to "absolute zero" –, which has been awarded to two matches: The Men Down Under vs. The Iron Sheik and Nikolai Volkoff at Heroes of Wrestling in October 1999; and Minoru Suzuki vs. Butterbean at the WrestleCon Mark Hitchcock Memorial Show in April 2025.

Wrestlers such as Bret Hart have written how proud they were when their performances were praised in the WON. Will Ospreay has also noted the positive impact a 5 star or greater rating from Meltzer had on his career. Others, such as Jim Cornette, PWInsider's Dave Scherer and Seth Rollins have criticized Meltzer's rating system, with Rollins notably questioning how a wrestler like Kurt Angle doesn't have a 5 star match. Meltzer himself has stated that his star system is "the least important" work he undertakes and has said that wrestlers and fans place far more importance on the star ratings than he does. Nevertheless, Meltzer's ratings are frequently a hot topic within the world of professional wrestling, and were so particularly in the late 2010s following the awarding of six stars to the Omega vs. Okada match at Wrestle Kingdom 11 in 2017.

== Awards and accomplishments ==
- Cauliflower Alley Club
  - James Melby Historian Award (2017)
- George Tragos/Lou Thesz Professional Wrestling Hall of Fame
  - Jim Melby Award (2016)
- Pro Wrestling Illustrated
  - Stanley Weston Award (2024)

== Filmography ==
Year	Title	Role	Notes
1999	Beyond the Mat	Himself	Documentary
2018	André the Giant	Himself	HBO documentary
2019–2025	Dark Side of the Ring	Himself	Vice TV miniseries
2024	Mr. McMahon	Himself	Netflix miniseries

== Bibliography ==
- Tributes: Remembering Some of the World's Greatest Wrestlers (Winding Stair Press, 2001, Hardcover) ISBN 1-55366-085-4 ISBN 978-1553660859
- Tributes II: Remembering More of the World's Greatest Wrestlers (Sports Publishing, 2004, Hardcover) ISBN 1-58261-817-8 ISBN 978-1582618173
