= Heroes of Wrestling =

Professional wrestling pay-per-view event

- Official event logo
- Promotion: Heroes of Wrestling
- Date: October 10, 1999
- City: Bay St. Louis, Mississippi
- Venue: Casino Magic
- Attendance: 2,300
- Buy rate: 29,000

Heroes of Wrestling was a professional wrestling pay-per-view (PPV) event that took place on October 10, 1999, from the Casino Magic hotel and casino in Bay St. Louis, Mississippi.

The event was meant to be the first in a series of pay-per-views that would feature popular wrestling stars from the 1980s and early 1990s, but plans for the franchise were abandoned following the event, which suffered from a poor buy rate and several controversies, including the calamitous main event where an intoxicated Jake Roberts teamed up with Yokozuna in a tag team match, only to lose to Jim Neidhart and King Kong Bundy.

== Production ==
Playing off the resurgence in popularity of pro wrestling at the time, Fosstone Productions president Bill Stone conceived a series of events consisting of wrestling stars from the 1980s and early 1990s fighting one another in a series of "dream matches". He expressed his surprise that the World Wrestling Federation had not already put on such an event. Stone intended to run three more pay-per-views, run on a quarterly basis, if an initial target of 40,000 buys was reached.

Recruitment of wrestlers began in May 1999. Sid Vicious was one of the first to be approached, and he recruited Michael Lombardi, promoter of Northeast Wrestling in New York, to act as booker. However, Sid was signed exclusively by World Championship Wrestling in June of that year, and so did not appear. Vader, Terry Funk, Bam Bam Bigelow and the Honky Tonk Man were all approached, but declined. Additionally, Nick Bockwinkel was advertised but did not appear. Due to WWF-owned trademarks, Yokozuna and The Bushwhackers were referred to with the affix "former" in all advertising.

A match was planned involving 2 Cold Scorpio and Reckless Youth, in order to break up the slower matches with fast-paced action. However, Youth was signed to a WWF developmental deal in the interim and was replaced by Julio Fantastico.

== Reception and controversy ==
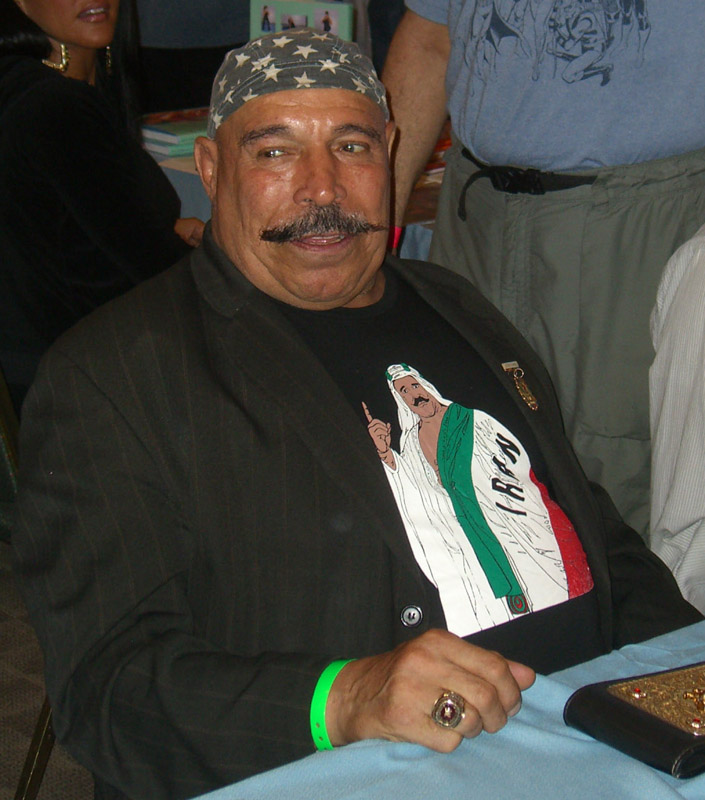
The Iron Sheik (pictured in 2009) had a match on this show that was extremely negatively received.

Although the event was heavily promoted, it was only purchased by 29,000 households. Additionally, the event itself was considered to be of extremely poor quality: Wrestling Observer rated it the worst major wrestling event of 1999, with its editor Dave Meltzer giving a rating of "absolute zero" (i.e. –459.4 [sic]) to a tag team match featuring Luke Williams and Butch Miller facing The Iron Sheik and Nikolai Volkoff. Meltzer's colleague, Bryan Alvarez of Figure Four Weekly, has repeatedly referred to this match as the worst he has ever seen and rated it "minus more stars than there are in the universe". PWInsider's Mike Johnson called it one of the worst PPVs ever.

=== Color commentary ===
Minor controversy initially erupted at the beginning of the broadcast due to a last-minute change of commentators.

Originally, Gordon Solie, a well-respected figure in the wrestling world with over forty years of experience delivering play-by-play, had been advertised as one of the event's commentators, along with Ted DiBiase. However, shortly before the event, Solie fell ill with throat cancer (to which he would succumb nine months later), and DiBiase was replaced at the last minute by Dutch Mantell. No announcement was made of these changes before the show, and neither Solie nor his illness were mentioned during the broadcast.

Solie's replacement, Randy Rosenbloom, appeared to have little or no knowledge of professional wrestling, delivering what would come to be regarded as some of the worst commentary ever given at a professional wrestling event.

Rosenbloom repeatedly made mistakes during the broadcast, such as misidentifying wrestlers' countries of origin, and also had to be repeatedly corrected on basic wrestling terminology by his broadcast partners, Mantell and Captain Lou Albano, such as when he called an arm drag performed by Marty Jannetty a "reverse slam takedown", and his inability to identify a simple dropkick, repeatedly calling the maneuver such things as a "flying kick," "flying leg kick," and "leg drop".

=== Jake Roberts incident ===
The show was originally booked to conclude with a double main event pitting Jake Roberts against Jim Neidhart, followed by King Kong Bundy against Yokozuna. Roberts' problems with drug and alcohol addiction had been well publicized in the preceding years, and his booking in the main event was meant to capitalize on the resurgence in popularity he had enjoyed as a result of his attempts at sobriety. Roberts' return to the ring was meant to be the high point of the evening, and the match responsible for generating the most publicity. However, Roberts suffered a relapse prior to the show and consumed a significant amount of alcohol before arriving. Prior to his match with Neidhart, Roberts had been scheduled to cut a promo in which he would taunt Neidhart. Due to his level of intoxication, Roberts' promo instead consisted of a slurred, incoherent rant consisting largely of wordplay based on the event's casino setting. One particular segment of the rant would go viral after it was posted on WrestleCrap:

You don't want to play cards with me because I'll cheat. Okay? I cheat. You wanna play 21? I've got 22. You want to play blackjack? I've got two of those, too! You wanna play ... Aces and eights, baby? I got too many of those, too!

After the interview, Roberts staggered to the ring with his trademark snake. However, upon reaching the ring, Roberts put the snake down and attempted to return backstage; he then reversed course, returned to ringside, and began greeting fans. Before entering the ring, Roberts grabbed a female fan and had her rub her hands on his bare chest. Later, Roberts removed the snake from its bag and simulated masturbation with it. The event's producers cut to wide-shots of the crowd during the incident, so that at-home viewers were unaware what was happening in the ring. Roberts eventually collapsed in the middle of the ring with the snake draped over his body; the supine Roberts then began to attempt to kiss the snake.

In an effort to salvage the match, promoter Bill Stone decided on the fly to combine the main events into one tag team event and sent Bundy to team with Neidhart and Yokozuna to team with Roberts. Stone then sent a member of the production crew, Michael Henry, to ringside to consult with the wrestlers. There was no finish planned for this match, as none of the wrestlers involved was willing to take a fall; Bundy and Yokozuna had even had it written into their contracts that they could not be pinned or submit.

Bundy pinned Roberts by hitting him with a splash after Roberts had staggered and fallen around the ring several times, despite Roberts not being the legal man in the ring. Yokozuna and Henry attempted to salvage the event and Roberts' reputation by trying to goad Roberts into attacking Henry, making his behavior appear scripted. Roberts was too inebriated to realize what was happening and remained oblivious to Yokozuna and Henry's attacks. Yokozuna then hit a Samoan drop on Henry to make the entire series of events appear scripted; while Yokozuna attacked Henry, Roberts began to disrobe in the middle of the ring and the producers cut the feed immediately thereafter.

In 2019, Roberts played the role of a card dealer in promotional material for the Casino Battle Royale match at AEW All Out, alluding to his Heroes of Wrestling appearance. He had completed a drug rehabilitation program with the help of fellow wrestler Diamond Dallas Page five years earlier.

== Results ==
No.	Results	Stipulations	Times
1	The Samoan Swat Team (Samu and The Samoan Savage) (with Paul Adams and Sika) defeated Marty Jannetty and Tommy Rogers	Tag Team match	10:00
2	Greg Valentine (with Sensational Sherri) defeated George Steele	Singles match	06:37
3	2 Cold Scorpio defeated Julio Fantastico	Singles match	09:37
4	The Men Down Under (Bushwhacker Butch and Bushwhacker Luke) defeated The Iron Sheik and Nikolai Volkoff (with Nikita Breznikoff)	Tag Team match	08:42
5	Tully Blanchard defeated Stan Lane	Singles match	07:04
6	Abdullah the Butcher (with Honest John Cheatum) vs. One Man Gang ended in a double count-out	Singles match	07:34
7	Jimmy Snuka (with Captain Lou Albano) defeated Bob Orton, Jr.	Singles match	11:46
8	Jim Neidhart and King Kong Bundy (with Michael Henry) defeated Jake Roberts and Yokozuna	Tag Team match	16:34

== Other on-air talent ==
- Randy Rosenbloom (commentator)
- Dutch Mantell (commentator)
- Captain Lou Albano (commissioner)
- Crisper Stanford (in-ring announcer)
- Michael St. John (backstage interviewer)

== See also ==
- Victory Road (2011), a wrestling pay-per-view where a wrestler in the main event was intoxicated
- Hart Legacy Wrestling, a wrestling promotion which suffered several controversies
