= Tributes: Remembering Some of the World's Greatest Wrestlers =

2001 book by Dave Meltzer

- Cover of the book
- Author: Dave Meltzer, Jeff Marek
- Illustrator: Photographs
- Language: English
- Series: Tributes
- Subject: Wrestling
- Genre: Collection
- Published: September 2001
- Publication place: United States
- Media type: Hardcover and paperback
- Pages: 182
- ISBN: 1553660854
- Followed by: Tributes II: Remembering More of the World's Greatest Wrestlers

Tributes: Remembering Some of the World's Greatest Wrestlers, sometimes known as Wrestling Observer's Tributes: Remembering Some of the World's Greatest Wrestlers or just Tributes is a 2001 book by sports journalist and professional wrestling historian Dave Meltzer, with a foreword by Jeff Marek.

== Content ==
The book contains tributes and obituaries for wrestlers such as Owen Hart, Brian Pillman, Rick Rude, André the Giant, Bruiser Brody, Fritz Von Erich and his son Kerry Von Erich, Yokozuna, Junkyard Dog, Giant Baba, Buddy Rogers, Big John Studd, Dino Bravo, Ray Stevens, Louie Spicolli, Art Barr, Eddie Gilbert, Jumbo Tsuruta and Gordon Solie. Meltzer rewrote eulogies that had been previously published in his magazine to fit a tone more suitable for books.

== Reception ==
Wrestling journalist John Molinaro of the Canadian Online Explorer's wrestling section SLAM! Wrestling expressed in his review that first time readers of Meltzer's work in the book would be amazed, stating that Meltzer is separated from his contemporaries in the field of wrestling writings by his ability to dissect and analyze events and actions of those in the wrestling industry by placing it all within a historical context. He characterized Tributes as strikingly descriptive, containing prose which drawing readers in without effort and fills their senses with lively imagery of the persons it focuses on. Molinaro also admired the use of images in the book, feeling they complimented the text greatly. Molinaro mentions and disregards detractors of the book who have accused it of being another piece of evidence for what they believe to be Meltzer's fascination and obsession with death, (due to Meltzer's many works on high early death rates in professional wrestling), Molinaro states: "Tributes is not about death, but rather a celebration of life, paying homage to those who gave their lives, literally, to this business. It restores honour to those who were robbed of it following their deaths as they were cruelly tossed aside on the scrap heap of forgotten souls by a cold and indifferent industry. Meltzer looks beyond the macabre body count of dead wrestlers that has piled up over the past twenty years, striving to put their careers and lives in proper perspective and giving them dignity while at the same time issuing a stern warning to the business to mend its ways before it's too late." Molinaro asserts that history is a main theme of the book and that while not necessarily going through the history of professional wrestling chronologically Meltzer nevertheless guindes the readers through it and gives a good idea of what it will become in the future, something which he suggests is a talent Meltzer alone possess. Molinaro finishes by concluding that Tributes is the authoritative record of some of the most significant wrestlers that ever performed and also stands as one of the most historically important documents published about professional wrestling of all time in his opinion.

Author Perry Lefko, also writing for SLAM! Wrestling praised the authenticity and historical accuracy in the book, comparing it favorably to other recent wrestling books at the time, stating that this was likely because of Meltzer's unwillingness to tarnish his reputation as a reporter. Contrasting it to Diana Hart biography, Under the Mat: Inside Wrestling's Greatest Family which according to him seemed to clearly have an ax to grind instead of being objective as Meltzer's publication. He also declared the book was one of the more interesting works to come about due to the success of Mick Foley's first autobiography Have a Nice Day!. Lefko goes on to say that his only critique of the book is about its title, expressing that while individuals such as Brian Pillman, Owen Hart, Yokozuna, Kerry Von Erich and Rick Rude were talented, they did not qualify as some of the greatest in the world.

== Sequel ==
The book was followed by a sequel in 2004 named Tributes II: Remembering More of the Worlds Greatest Wrestlers.

== See also ==
- List of premature professional wrestling deaths
