= The Iron Sheik and Nikolai Volkoff =

Professional wrestling tag team

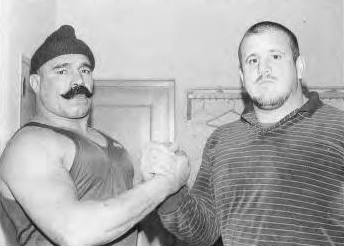
- Iron Sheik (left) and Nikolai Volkoff (right), circa 1986

Tag team
- Members: The Iron Sheik; Nikolai Volkoff; Freddie Blassie (manager); Slick (manager)
- Name: The Iron Sheik and Nikolai Volkoff
- Billed heights: The Iron Sheik: 6 ft 0 in (1.83 m); Nikolai Volkoff: 6 ft 4 in (1.93 m)
- Combined billed weight: 521 lb (236 kg); The Iron Sheik: 258 lb (117 kg); Nikolai Volkoff: 313 lb (142 kg)
- Debut: 1984
- Disbanded: 1987
- Years active: 1984–1987, 1999

The Iron Sheik and Nikolai Volkoff were a professional wrestling tag team who competed in the World Wrestling Federation (WWF) from 1984 to 1987.

== History ==
After Sheik had lost the WWF World Championship to Hulk Hogan and Volkoff, who had left the WWF after previously being billed as Bepo Mongol being part of a tag team called The Mongols managed by "Captain" Lou Albano who had held the WWF International Tag Team Championship twice, had since returned in July 1984, Vince McMahon then chose to team them up, and soon they became one of the most hated tag teams in WWF history. The team became managed by "Classy" Freddie Blassie, and they won the World Tag Team Championship from The U.S. Express (Barry Windham and Mike Rotunda) at the first WrestleMania at Madison Square Garden when Sheik had knocked out Windham from behind with Blassie's cane.

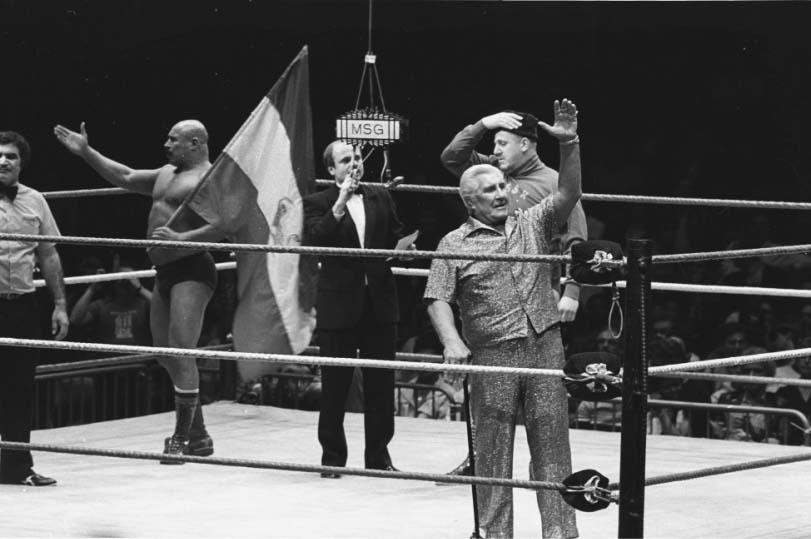
Iron Sheik (second-to-last left) and Volkoff (rear right) alongside manager Freddie Blassie (front right) in the mid 1980s

Part of the pair's regular entrance consisted of waving the flags of Iran and the Soviet Union, then demanding that the crowd be quiet and "show respect" while Volkoff sang a throaty version of the Soviet national anthem, a demand that usually only attracted boos from the usually pro-American crowds. Sheik then usually grabbed the mic and said "Iran number 1, Russia number 1, USA - HACK-POOIE!" (which was followed by a simulated spitting act). It was all designed (very successfully) to get major heat from the crowd. On May 11, 1985, at the first Saturday Night's Main Event, Sheik, Volkoff, and George Steele were defeated by the team of Windham, Rotunda, and Ricky Steamboat. Windham and Rotundo would win back the belts from Sheik and Volkoff.

== Continued career ==
Volkoff and Sheik both wrestled at WrestleMania 2, but not as a team. Volkoff wrestled and lost to Corporal Kirchner in a flag vs flag match in the Chicago part of the event. Sheik competed in the 20-man invitational Battle royal, also in the Chicago portion of the event, during which 14 WWF superstars got in the ring with 6 National Football League (NFL) players. Sheik was the 13th participant eliminated, at 5:22 by Bruno Sammartino, and the Battle royal was won by André the Giant. In 1986 Sheik and Volkoff defeated The Hart Foundation (Bret Hart and Jim Neidhart) in a heel vs heel match. In late 1986 Blassie, who retired from wrestling, sold their contacts to Slick.

Sheik and Volkoff had feuds with and wrestled against many top tag teams such as The Can-Am Connection (Rick Martel and Tom Zenk), The British Bulldogs (Davey Boy Smith and the Dynamite Kid), The Islanders (Haku and Tama) The Young Stallions (Jim Powers and Paul Roma) and The Killer Bees ("Jumpin" Jim Brunzell and B. Brian Blair), and would also often team with Butch Reed and Hercules, who Slick was also managing in six man tag team matches. On March 29, 1987, at WrestleMania III at the Pontiac Silverdome in Pontiac, Michigan, Sheik and Volkoff competed as a team against The Killer Bees. At the beginning of the match when Volkoff began to sing the Russian national anthem, "Hacksaw" Jim Duggan, who had just joined the WWF, came down to the ring and cleared the ring of Volkoff, Sheik, and Slick after chasing them out with his 2×4. Sheik and Volkoff won the match by disqualification when Duggan interfered, due to the cheating of Slick, Sheik, and Volkoff. After Windham and Rotunda had lost the tag titles to The Dream Team (Brutus Beefcake and Greg Valentine, who were managed by "Luscious" Johnny Valiant), Sheik and Volkoff would challenge The Dream Team for the titles, but would not regain the belts, as both teams were disqualified.

After WrestleMania III Sheik and Volkoff began a feud with Duggan, who would often run down to the ring and attack Volkoff and Sheik. Memorable matches this occurred at was on episode 11 of Saturday Night's Main Event when The Can-Am Connection wrestled and defeated Sheik and Volkoff after Duggan, who was sitting in the front row of the audience, interfered due to the cheating of Sheik, Volkoff, and Slick, and on the April 25, 1987 episode of WWF Superstars of Wrestling when Sheik, Volkoff, and Reed who had teamed up wrestled and defeated The Islanders and Siva Afi.

== Arrest ==
Sheik and Volkoff were forced to disband when Sheik and Duggan were pulled over by New Jersey State Police on their way to a WWF event. Officers suspected Duggan of DUI (even though Sheik and Duggan were feuding onscreen they were not in real life). After a search of the vehicle and the persons, police discovered that Duggan was under the influence of marijuana while the Sheik was high on cocaine. Small amounts of cocaine were also found in the vehicle. Duggan received a conditional release while the Sheik was placed on probation for a year. The mini-scandal that erupted after two in-ring enemies were found drinking and doing drugs together led to the end of the angle, and Sheik's release, and Duggan's temporary departure from the WWF.

== Breakup, aftermath, and brief reunions ==
Sometime after Sheik was fired, Slick replaced him with Boris Zhukov (a kayfabe Russian) as The Bolsheviks, but the new team was not successful. Sheik returned to the WWF, again under the management of Slick, but as a singles wrestler and would not re-unite with Volkoff, and would soon leave the WWF once again in 1988. Sheik returned in 1991 as Col. Mustafa, but left in 1992. Volkoff left the company in 1992 and returned in 1994 until 1995. In the 1990s they teamed in the independent circuit. On October 12, 1999, Sheik and Volkoff teamed up for the first time since 1987 at the Heroes of Wrestling pay-per-view event and would wrestle against and lose to The Bushwhackers.

Sheik and Volkoff appeared together when they were into inducted the WWE Hall of Fame on April 2, 2005, at the Universal Amphitheatre in Los Angeles, California. However, they were inducted separately, not as a tag team.

On the March 10, 2008 edition of WWE Raw, which featured rematches from previous WrestleManias, Sheik appeared along with Volkoff to face off against Windham and Rotunda in a rematch from the first WrestleMania. However, the match never got started as Jillian Hall came out to interrupt Volkoff's singing so she could sing Bruce Springsteen's "Born in the U.S.A.", which the U.S. Express used as their ring entrance music in 1984–85.

On the November 15, 2010, edition of Raw, as part of the Old School theme, Volkoff again appeared with Sheik and Slick, and they sung the Soviet national anthem before being interrupted by Santino Marella and Vladimir Kozlov, the latter of whom then sung a duet with Volkoff of the Russian National anthem.

Volkoff died at the age of 70 in 2018 from dehydration and other medical issues, and Sheik died at the age of 81 in 2023 from heart failure and years of health issues.

== Championships and accomplishments ==
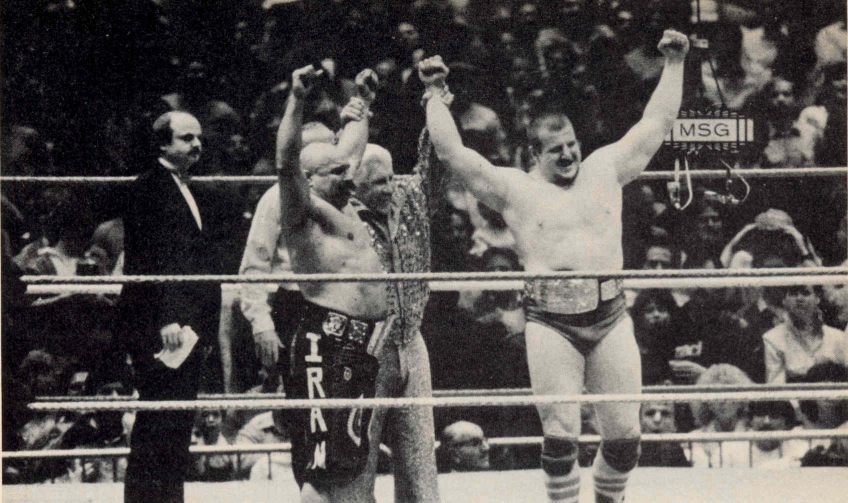
The Iron Sheik and Volkoff were one-time WWF Tag Team Champions

- Pro Wrestling Illustrated
  - PWI ranked them # 96 of the 100 best tag teams of the "PWI Years" in 2003.
- World Wrestling Federation
  - WWF Tag Team Championship (1 time)

== See also ==
- The Bolsheviks
