= List of professional wrestling attendance records on the independent circuit =

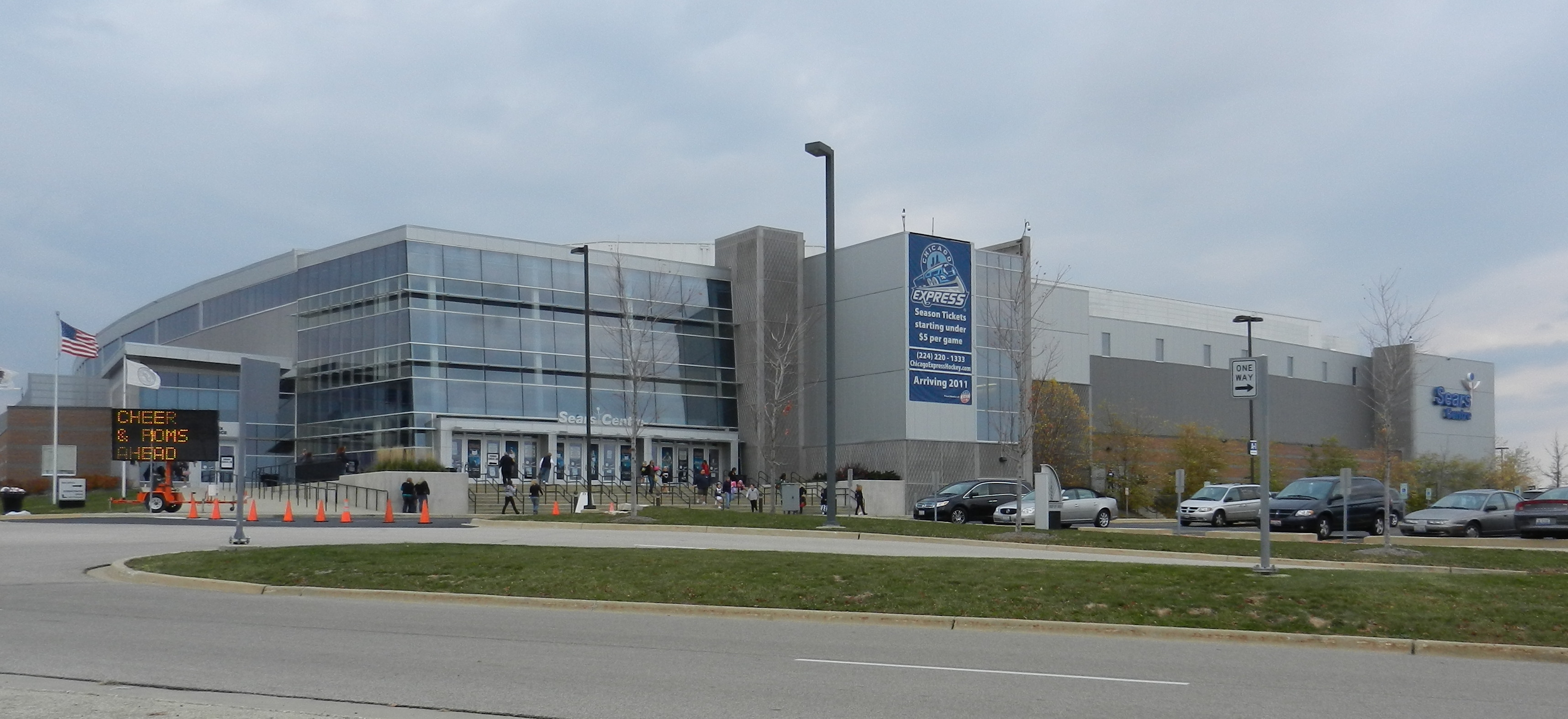
The Sears Centre Arena hosted All In on September 1, 2018. With 11,263 fans in attendance, it is the highest attended independent wrestling event of all time.

This is a list of professional wrestling attendance records on the independent circuit. There are many professional wrestling shows held at sporting events, often as part of half-time or post-game shows, or major public gatherings that have ranged from 12,000 to 35,000 people. The most attended live event of all time, however, is All In which was attended by 11,263 fans. Co-promoted by Cody Rhodes and The Young Bucks (Matt Jackson and Nick Jackson), it was the first non-World Championship Wrestling or World Wrestling Entertainment event in the United States to sell 10,000 tickets since 1993.

The early-1990s were dominated by the United States Wrestling Association based in Memphis, Tennessee. With the close of the American Wrestling Association (1933–1991) and Pacific Northwest Wrestling (1925–1992), the USWA was the last remaining territory-era promotion in North America. Its biggest show during this period was Memphis Memories held at the Mid-South Coliseum before 8,377 on March 7, 1994, in which the Memphis Wrestling Hall of Fame was introduced. Within a few years, the USWA's position as the top independent promotion in North America was being challenged by other groups across Canada and the United States. The most successful of these were Smoky Mountain Wrestling (1991–1995) and Extreme Championship Wrestling (1992–2001). SMW's Superbowl of Wrestling, headlined by Shawn Michaels vs. Buddy Landel for the WWF Intercontinental Championship, was the biggest drawing show of 1995 with 5,000 fans in attendance. While SMW was forced to shut down in 1995, ECW survived to become a national touring promotion as part of the "Big 3" in pro wrestling.

By the early-21st century, a new generation of independent companies had emerged. The most prominent of these were Ring of Honor, Major League Wrestling, Northeast Wrestling and Juggalo Championship Wrestling. Canadian promotions such as Blood, Sweat & Ears, Border City Wrestling and Lutte 2000 were also represented for the first time. National Wrestling Alliance affiliates set a number of records as well. Following a successful international USO tour in 2000, NWA Mid-Atlantic Championship Wrestling held the first-ever American pro wrestling shows in China from December 30, 2003, to January 3, 2004. The first night of The Next Revolution tour drew 7,500 people at Tianhe Gymnasium. The next two events drew 6,100 at Huadu Stadium and 3,400 at Guangzhou Gymnasium respectively. WWE developmental territories Deep South Wrestling, Heartland Wrestling Association and Ohio Valley Wrestling also made an impact on the independent scene. OVW, which was booked by SMW founder Jim Cornette from 1999 until 2005, was arguably the most successful of the three with record-setting shows at Louisville Gardens and Six Flags Kentucky Kingdom.

Ring of Honor began holding regular pay-per-view (PPV) events via the Dish Network starting in 2007, and was acknowledged as the third major U.S. promotion following its national television deal with the Sinclair Broadcasting Group four years later. The 2010s saw the increasing influence of "lucha libre" in the industry with the debut of Lucha Libre USA (2010–2012) and Lucha Underground (2014–2018) on U.S. television. The Heroes of Lucha Libre, featuring Rey Mysterio Jr. vs. Richard Trumposo in the main event, was held at the Galen Center in Los Angeles, California on June 2, 2018, before 3,000 fans. It was the largest indy live event of the year (along with the Legends of Wrestling show at Detroit's Fraser Hockeyland) until the All In pay-per-view three months later.

== Events and attendances ==
Note: Minimum attendance of 5,000.

- Light Grey indicates event was a free show and/or held at a major public gathering.

Promotion	Event	Location	Venue	Attendance	Main Event(s)
NWA-NE	WRKO's Taste of the Boss; September 25, 1999	Boston, Massachusetts	Boston City Hall Plaza	35,000	5-0 (Trooper Gilmore and Corporal Johnson) vs. Victor Rivera and Jay Kobain
Lutte 2000	Alouettes Mania I August 25, 2002	Montreal, Quebec	Stade Percival-Molson	20,000	Jacques Rougeau vs. King Kong Bundy
LF	Alouettes Mania III; July 15, 2004	Montreal, Quebec	Stade Percival-Molson	20,000 (Note: This was part of a halftime show for a CFL game between the Montreal Alouettes vs. Calgary Stampeders.)	Jacques Rougeau vs. Kamala
LF	Alouettes Mania IV; July 8, 2005	Montreal, Quebec	Stade Percival-Molson	20,000 (Note: This was part of a halftime show for a CFL game between the Montreal Alouettes vs. Edmonton Eskimos.)	Jim Duggan vs. Kurrgan with special referee Jacques Rougeau
IWR	Warped Tour 2002; August 3, 2003	Pontiac, Michigan	Pontiac Silverdome	19,000	Deranged vs. Tommy Starr in a UV Light Tube Death match
BELIEVE	BELIEVE 156; April 21, 2018	Orlando, Florida	Central Florida Fairgrounds	15,000	Aaron Epic (c) vs. Andrew Merlin for the SCW Florida Heavyweight Championship
AWF	Cement Belt Fair; June 21, 1990	Cementon, Pennsylvania	Cementon Fairgrounds	12,500	Heidi Lee Morgan vs. Baby Face Nellie
WPW	OC Fair: Flower Power (Day 2); July 23, 2006	Costa Mesa, California	Washington Mutual Arena	12,000	El Hijo del Santo, Lil Cholo and Silver Tyger vs. Infernal, Super Kendo 2 and Super Parka
—	All In; September 1, 2018	Hoffman Estates, Illinois	Sears Centre Arena	11,263	The Golden Elite (Kota Ibushi, Matt Jackson and Nick Jackson) vs. Bandido, Rey Fénix and Rey Mysterio in a six-man tag team match
BBWF	Caribbean Wrestling Bash: The Legends Tour; September 9, 2012	San Nicolas, Aruba	Joe Laveist Ballpark	11,000	Scott Steiner vs. Billy Gunn for the Aruba Wrestling Bash Championship
WWN	WWNLive in China (Day 4); November 16, 2014	Beijing, China	Cadillac Arena	10,500	Ricochet (c) vs. Johnny Gargano for the Open the Freedom Gate Championship
WPW	OC Fair: Flower Power (Day 1); July 22, 2006	Costa Mesa, California	Washington Mutual Arena	10,000	El Hijo del Santo, Lil Cholo and Silver Tyger vs. Infernal, Super Kendo 2 and Super Parka
BBWF	Caribbean Wrestling Bash: The Legends Tour; September 8, 2012	San Nicolas, Aruba	Joe Laveist Ballpark	9,000	Scott Steiner vs. Kevin Nash
HWA	BaseBrawl; July 19, 2003	Columbus, Ohio	Cooper Stadium	8,757 (Note: This was part of a post-game show for an MLB game between the Columbus Clippers vs. Louisville Bats.)	Rory Fox (c) vs. Shark Boy for the HWA Cruiserweight Championship
USWA	Memphis Memories; March 7, 1994	Memphis, Tennessee	Mid-South Coliseum	8,377	Jerry Lawler vs. Austin Idol vs. Brian Christopher vs. Doug Gilbert vs. Eddie Gilbert vs. Jimmy Valiant vs. Koko B. Ware vs. Moondog Spot vs. Terry Funk vs. Tommy Rich in a 10-man elimination match
WXW	Sportsfest; July 12, 1998	Allentown, Pennsylvania	Cedar Beach Park	8,000	The Love Connection (Jay Love and Georgie Love) vs. D'Lo Brown and Owen Hart
USWA / WWF	USWA vs. WWF; February 17, 1996	Memphis, Tennessee	Mid-South Coliseum	7,500	Bret Hart (c) vs. Jerry Lawler in a Steel Cage match for the WWF World Heavyweight Championship
NWA-MACW	The Next Revolution (Day 1); December 30, 2003	Guangzhou, China	Tianhe Gymnasium	7,500	Terry Taylor (c) vs. Steve Williams for the NWA Mid-Atlantic Heavyweight Championship
FMLL	LuchaMania USA Tour; January 26, 2013	Los Angeles, California	Los Angeles Memorial Sports Arena	7,000	Blue Demon Jr., Cien Caras Jr. and Dr. Wagner Jr. vs. El Hijo del Santo, L.A. Par-K and Rayo de Jalisco Jr. in a six-man tag team match
FMW / WWA	FMW vs. WWA; May 16, 1992	Los Angeles, California	Cal State-Los Angeles Gym	6,250	Atsushi Onita, Tarzan Goto and El Hijo del Santo vs. Negro Casas, Horace Boulder and Tim Patterson in a Best 2-out-of-3 Falls Street Fight match
NWA-MACW	The Next Revolution (Day 2); January 1, 2004	Guangzhou, China	Huadu Stadium	6,100	Steve Williams (c) vs. Terry Taylor for the NWA Mid-Atlantic Heavyweight Championship
IWC	Big Butler Fair; June 28, 2003	Prospect, Pennsylvania	Big Butler Fairgrounds	6,000	Dusty Rhodes vs. Jerry Lawler
Multiple	World Wrestling Peace Festival; June 1, 1996	Los Angeles, California	Los Angeles Sports Arena	5,964	Antonio Inoki and Dan Severn vs. Yoshiaki Fujiwara and Oleg Taktarov
ECW	November to Remember; November 1, 1998	New Orleans, Louisiana	Lakefront Arena	5,800	The Triple Threat (Shane Douglas, Bam Bam Bigelow and Chris Candido) vs. New Triple Threat (Sabu, Rob Van Dam and Taz)
JCW	Bloodymania; August 11, 2007	Cave-In-Rock, Illinois	Hatchet Landings	5,800	Sabu and The Insane Clown Posse (Shaggy 2 Dope and Violent J) vs. Trent Acid and The Young Altar Boys (Young Altar Boy #1 and Young Altar Boy #4)
Lutte 2000	Pierre Carl Ouellet vs. Kurrgan; December 30, 2001	Montreal, Quebec	Centre Bell	5,500+ (Note: There are different reports on the attendance of the event with numbers ranging from 5,500 to as high as 10,000 and 12,000.)	Pierre Carl Ouellet vs. Kurrgan with special referee Sid Vicious
FCW	Pride; September 24, 2005	Inglewood, California	Great Western Forum	5,500	Blue Demon Jr., El Hijo del Santo, Mil Mascaras and Tinieblas vs. Dr. Wagner Jr., Scorpio Jr. and Los Guerreros del Infierno (Rey Bucanero and Ultimo Guerrero)
—	Funk Free for All; October 28, 1993	Amarillo, Texas	Amarillo Civic Center	5,500	Terry Funk vs. Eddie Gilbert in a Texas Death match
WWWoW	Cleveland County Fair; October 1, 1992	Shelby, North Carolina	Cleveland County Fairgrounds	5,200	9-man battle royal
NWA-OVW	Christmas Chaos; January 31, 2001	Louisville, Kentucky	Louisville Gardens	5,010	Leviathan vs. Kane
USWA	Challenge for the Championship; October 8, 1990	Memphis, Tennessee	Mid-South Coliseum	5,000	20-man tournament for the vacant USWA World Heavyweight Championship
SMW	Night of Legends; August 5, 1994	Knoxville, Tennessee	Knoxville Civic Coliseum	5,000	Bob Armstrong, Tracy Smothers and Road Warrior Hawk vs. Bruiser Bedlam and The Funk Brothers (Dory Funk Jr. and Terry Funk)
SMW	Superbowl of Wrestling; August 4, 1995	Knoxville, Tennessee	Knoxville Civic Coliseum	5,000	Shawn Michaels vs. Buddy Landel for the WWF Intercontinental Championship
NEPW	Lake County Fair; August 24, 2002	Painesville, Ohio	Lake County Fairgrounds	5,000	Julio Dinero vs. Dick Trimmins
WXW	Sportsfest; July 9, 2004	Allentown, Pennsylvania	Cedar Beach Park	5,000	Rapid Fire Maldonado (c) vs. Mana the Polynesian Warrior for the WXW Heavyweight Championship
MW	Throwback Night II; August 28, 2004	Memphis, Tennessee	Mid-South Coliseum	5,000	Terry Funk and Corey Maclin vs. Jerry Lawler and Jimmy Hart with special referee Jimmy Valiant
ASW	DukesFest 2007; June 12, 2007	Nashville, Tennessee	Music City Motorplex	5,000	Iron Cross, Bobby Houston and Jerry Lawler vs. Stan Lee, Eddie Golden and K.C. Thunder

== Historical ==
=== 1990s ===
Note: Extreme Championship Wrestling became a national touring company after holding its first pay-per-view (PPV) event, ECW Barely Legal, on April 13, 1997. In July 1999, ECW was acknowledged as the third major U.S. promotion by Pro Wrestling Illustrated following its national television deal with TNN.

Top 10 most-attended shows in 1990
No.	Promotion	Event	Location	Venue	Attendance	Main Event(s)	Ref.
—	AWF	Cement Belt Fair; June 21, 1990	Cementon, Pennsylvania	Cementon Fairgrounds	12,500	Heidi Lee Morgan vs. Baby Face Nellie	
1.	USWA	Challenge for the Championship; October 8, 1990	Memphis, Tennessee	Mid-South Coliseum	5,000	20-man tournament for the vacant USWA World Heavyweight Championship	
2.	USWA-D	Jerry Lawler vs. Kerry Von Erich; January 20, 1990	Waco, Texas	Heart of Texas Coliseum	4,900+	Jerry Lawler (c) vs. Kerry Von Erich in a non-title match for the USWA World Heavyweight Championship	
3.	NWL	Wrestlers of the Universe Tour: Super Slam '90; June 22, 1990	Mangilao, Guam	University of Guam	4,500	Larry Zbyszko (c-AWA) vs. Kerry Von Erich (c-USWA) in a Champion vs. Champion match for the AWA World Heavyweight Championship and USWA World Heavyweight Championship	
4.	NWL	Wrestlers of the Universe Tour: Super Slam '90; June 21, 1990	Mangilao, Guam	University of Guam	3,600	The Fantastics (Bobby Fulton and Jackie Fulton) vs. The Satanic Warriors (Satanic Warrior I and Satanic Warrior II)	
5.	USWA	Jerry Lawler, Bill Dundee & Austin Idol vs. Eddie Gilbert, Tony Anthony & John Tatum; August 6, 1990	Memphis, Tennessee	Mid-South Coliseum	3,500	Jerry Lawler, Bill Dundee and Austin Idol vs. Eddie Gilbert, Tony Anthony and John Tatum in a Stretcher match	
5.	USWA	Jerry Lawler, Bill Dundee & Austin Idol vs. Tony Anthony, Eddie Gilbert & Doug Gilbert; August 13, 1990	Memphis, Tennessee	Mid-South Coliseum	3,500	Jerry Lawler, Bill Dundee and Austin Idol vs. Tony Anthony, Eddie Gilbert and Doug Gilbert in a Steel Cage match	
6.	USWA	Jimmy Valiant vs. Jerry Lawler; March 12, 1990	Memphis, Tennessee	Mid-South Coliseum	3,312	Jimmy Valiant (c) vs. Jerry Lawler for the USWA World Heavyweight Championship	
7.	USWA	USWA Championship Wrestling; August 20, 1990 (Note: Aired on tape delay on September 1, 1990.)	Memphis, Tennessee	Mid-South Coliseum	2,750	Jerry Lawler, Bill Dundee and Austin Idol vs. Tony Anthony, Eddie Gilbert and Doug Gilbert in a Hair vs. Hair match	
8.	USWA	Jerry Lawler, Jim Cornette & The Fabulous Ones vs. Tony Anthony, Sam Lowe, Eddie Gilbert & Doug Gilbert; December 10, 1990	Memphis, Tennessee	Mid-South Coliseum	2,600	Jerry Lawler, Jim Cornette and The Fabulous Ones (Stan Lane and Steve Keirn) vs. Tony Anthony, Sam Lowe, Eddie Gilbert and Doug Gilbert	
9.	USWA	USWA Championship Wrestling; February 26, 1990 (Note: Aired on tape delay on March 10, 1990.)	Memphis, Tennessee	Mid-South Coliseum	2,500	Jerry Lawler (c) vs. Jimmy Valiant for the USWA World Heavyweight Championship	
9.	NWL	Wrestlers of the Universe Tour: Super Slam '90; June 30, 1990	Hilo, Hawaii	Afook-Chinen Civic Auditorium	2,500	Bob Orton vs. Kerry Von Erich	
10.	TWA	Spring Spectacular; March 31, 1990	Philadelphia, Pennsylvania	McGonigle Hall	2,000	Tully Blanchard vs. Bam Bam Bigelow in a Steel Cage match	
10.	USWA	USWA Championship Wrestling; August 27, 1990 (Note: Aired on tape delay on September 8, 1990.)	Memphis, Tennessee	Mid-South Coliseum	2,000	19-man $5,000 Battle Royal	

Top 10 most-attended shows in 1991
No.	Promotion	Event	Location	Venue	Attendance	Main Event(s)	Ref.
1.	NWF	Chief Jules Strongbow vs. Abdullah the Butcher; February 28, 1991	Athens, Greece	Peace and Friendship Stadium	5,500	Chief Jules Strongbow vs. Abdullah the Butcher	
2.	WCW	Battle of the Belts 2 May 18, 1991	Chicago, Illinois	Chicago Amphitheatre	3,218	Ken Patera vs. Lanny Poffo	
—	ICW	Tribute to Freedom; July 4, 1991	Lima, Ohio	Allen County Fairgrounds	2,600	Jim Lancaster and The Nightmares vs. Scott Stevens and The Wild Bunch (Al Snow and Mike Kelly) in a Grudge match	
—	—	Operation Welcome Home; July 4, 1991	Cocoa Beach, Florida	Patrick Air Force Base	2,500		
3.	WCW	Cumberland County Fair; August 19, 1991	Greenup, Illinois	Cumberland County Fairgrounds	2,000	Ron Powers vs. Mad Maxx	
3.	USWA	Star Wars; September 2, 1991	Memphis, Tennessee	Mid-South Coliseum	2,000	The Dragon Master (c) vs. Jerry Lawler for the USWA World Heavyweight Championship	
4.	TWA	Winter Challenge II; March 2, 1991	Philadelphia, Pennsylvania	Pennsylvania Hall	1,735	Terry Funk (c) vs. Jerry Lawler in a Fan Participation Lumberjack match for the USWA World Heavyweight Championship	
5.	WWA	WWA Rumble II: Wrestlers vs. Hunger; August 17, 1991	Blackwood, New Jersey	Camden County College	1,700	Terry Funk vs. Bob Backlund	
6.	USWA	Terry Funk vs. Jerry Lawler; March 11, 1991	Memphis, Tennessee	Mid-South Coliseum	1,600	Terry Funk (c) vs. Jerry Lawler for the USWA World Heavyweight Championship with special guest referee Jackie Fargo	
7.	TWA	Autumn Armageddon II; September 21, 1991	Philadelphia, Pennsylvania	Original Sports Bar	1,524	Abdullah the Butcher vs. The Sheik in a Steel Cage match	
8.	WWA	Marion Mania; March 8, 1991 (Note: The date of the event was officially advertised for March 8, 1991, however, The Wrestling Observer claims it took place on March 10, 1991.)	Marion, Ohio	Marion Fairgrounds Coliseum	1,500	Ron Garvin vs. Paul Orndorff	
9.	WCW	Arm Wrestling Challenge; April 13, 1991	Hebron, Indiana	Hebron High School	1,300	Ken Patera vs. Mad Maxx	
9.	USWA	Memphis Fall Wrestle Fest; September 9, 1991	Memphis, Tennessee	Mid-South Coliseum	1,300	Jerry Lawler and Dirty White Boy vs. Eric Embry and P.Y. Chu-Hi	
10.	TWA	Spring Spectacular II; May 18, 1991	Philadelphia, Pennsylvania	Pennsylvania Hall	1,253	Rick Rude vs. Paul Orndorff	

Top 10 most-attended shows in 1992
No.	Promotion	Event	Location	Venue	Attendance	Main Event(s)	Ref.
1.	FMW / WWA	FMW vs. WWA; May 16, 1992	Los Angeles, California	Cal State-Los Angeles Gym	6,250	Atsushi Onita, Tarzan Goto and El Hijo del Santo vs. Negro Casas, Horace Boulder and Tim Patterson in a Best 2-out-of-3 Falls Street Fight match	
—	WWWoW	Cleveland County Fair; October 1, 1992	Shelby, North Carolina	Cleveland County Fairgrounds	5,200	9-man Battle Royal	
2.	USWA	Jerry Lawler vs. The Christmas Creature; December 28, 1992	Memphis, Tennessee	Mid-South Coliseum	3,500 (Note: There are different reports on the attendance of the event with numbers ranging from 2,100 to 3,500.)	Jerry Lawler (c) vs. The Christmas Creature in a Mask vs. Title match for the USWA World Heavyweight Championship	
3.	PWFG	The Toughest of Tough Men; March 20, 1992	Miami, Florida	James L. Knight Center	2,800	Bart Vale vs. Yoshiaki Fujiwara	
4.	USWA	"Check on a Pole" Battle Royal; July 27, 1992	Memphis, Tennessee	Mid-South Coliseum	2,500	20-man "Check on a Pole" Battle Royal	
4.	USWA	Jerry Lawler vs. Koko B. Ware; December 7, 1992	Memphis, Tennessee	Mid-South Coliseum	2,500	Jerry Lawler (c) vs. Koko B. Ware for the USWA World Heavyweight Championship	
5.	ASW	Jimmy Snuka vs. Demolition Ax; December 5, 1992	Wilmington, Massachusetts	Shirners Auditorium	2,300	Jimmy Snuka vs. Demolition Ax	
6.	USWA	The Moondogs vs. Jerry Lawler & Austin Idol; February 2, 1992	Memphis, Tennessee	Mid-South Coliseum	2,200	The Moondogs (Moondog Spot and Moondog Spike) (c) vs. Jerry Lawler and Austin Idol for the USWA Tag Team Championship	
7.	USWA	The Moondogs & Big Black Dog vs. Jerry Lawler, Austin Idol & Jeff Jarrett; February 10, 1992	Memphis, Tennessee	Mid-South Coliseum	2,100	Big Black Dog and The Moondogs (Moondog Spot and Moondog Spike) vs. Jerry Lawler, Austin Idol and Jeff Jarrett	
—	PWF	Christmas Spectactular; December 12, 1992	Charlotte, North Carolina	Northside Church Gymnasium	2,050 (Note: Event was a free show and/or held at a major public gathering.)	The Italian Stallion vs. Cruel Connection #2	
8.	FMW / WWA	FMW vs. WWA II; May 31, 1992	Los Angeles, California	Cal State-Los Angeles Gym	1,800	Bull Rider, Lover Boy and Ultraman 2000 vs. El Cobarde II, Fishman and Negro Casas	
8.	USWA	The Moondogs vs. Jerry Lawler & Jeff Jarrett; June 29, 1992	Memphis, Tennessee	Mid-South Coliseum	1,800	The Moondogs (Moondog Spot and Moondog Cujo) (c) vs. Jerry Lawler and Jeff Jarrett in a Steel Cage match for the USWA Tag Team Championship with Jackie Fargo as special referee	
8.	USWA	Ricky Morton vs. Eddie Gilbert; July 20, 1992	Memphis, Tennessee	Mid-South Coliseum	1,800	Ricky Morton (c) vs. Eddie Gilbert for the USWA World Heavyweight Championship	
8.	USWA	Bill Dundee vs. Tommy Rich; August 31, 1992	Memphis, Tennessee	Mid-South Coliseum	1,800	Bill Dundee vs. Tommy Rich in a Steel Cage match	
9.	WWWA	Bob Orton Jr. vs. Bulldog Brower; October 5, 1992	Williamstown, New Jersey		1,750	Bob Orton Jr. vs. Bulldog Brower	
10.	SMW	Christmas Chaos (Day 2); December 26, 1992	Johnson City, Tennessee	Freedom Hall Civic Center	1,700	The Rock 'n' Roll Express (Ricky Morton and Robert Gibson) (c) vs. Jim Cornette and The Heavenly Bodies (Stan Lane and Tom Prichard) in a Handicap match for the SMW Tag Team Championship	

Top 10 most-attended shows in 1993
No.	Promotion	Event	Location	Venue	Attendance	Main Event(s)	Ref.
1.	—	Funk Free for All; October 28, 1993	Amarillo, Texas	Amarillo Civic Center	5,500	Terry Funk vs. Eddie Gilbert in a Texas Death match	
2.	PWF	Pro WrestleMania II; December 10, 1993	Charlotte, North Carolina	Charlotte Coliseum	4,500	George South and The Italian Stallion vs. Austin Steele and Black Scorpion	
3.	USWA	The Big Match; August 2, 1993	Memphis, Tennessee	Mid-South Coliseum	3,200 (Note: There are different reports on the attendance of the event with numbers ranging from 2,800 to 3,200.)	Jerry Lawler vs. Bret Hart	
4.	USWA	Jerry Lawler vs. Randy Savage; March 9, 1993	Louisville, Kentucky		3,000	Jerry Lawler (c) vs. Randy Savage for the USWA World Heavyweight Championship	
5.	SMW	K-Town Showdown; August 20, 1993	Knoxville, Tennessee	Knoxville Civic Coliseum	2,780	Bob Armstrong vs. Jim Cornette in a Lumberjacks with Tennis Rackets match with Big Boss Man as special referee	
6.	PWFG	Bart Vale vs. Mack Roesch; February 19, 1993	Miami, Florida	Mahi Temple	2,700	Bart Vale (c) vs. Mack Roesch for the PWFG Shoot Fighting Championship	
7.	USWA	Jerry Lawler vs. Bret Hart; August 29, 1993	Memphis, Tennessee	Mid-South Coliseum	2,100	Jerry Lawler vs. Bret Hart in a Steel Cage match	
8.	SMW	Bluegrass Brawl; April 2, 1993	Pikeville, Kentucky	Pikeville College Gym	2,000 (Note: The Pro Wrestlemania event was a free show and/or held at a major public gathering.)	Bobby Eaton and The Heavenly Bodies (Stan Lane and Tom Prichard) vs. Arn Anderson and The Rock 'n' Roll Express (Ricky Morton and Robert Gibson) vs. Dutch Mantell and The Stud Stable (Robert Fuller and Jimmy Golden) in a three-way Street Fight match	
8.	USWA	Jerry Lawler vs. Paul Neighbors Jr. June 21, 1993	Memphis, Tennessee	Mid-South Coliseum	2,000	Jerry Lawler vs. Paul Neighbors Jr.	
8.	PWF	The Italian Stallion vs. The Black Scorpion; November 12, 1993	Richmond, Virginia		2,000	The Italian Stallion vs. The Black Scorpion	
9.	WWA	Big Boss Man vs. Dick Murdoch; September 18, 1993	Elizabeth, New Jersey		1,860	Big Boss Man vs. Dick Murdoch	
10.	USWA	USWA vs. WWF; August 16, 1993	Memphis, Tennessee	Mid-South Coliseum	1,850	Jerry Lawler and Jeff Jarrett vs. Bret Hart and Owen Hart	

Top 10 most-attended shows in 1994
No.	Promotion	Event	Location	Venue	Attendance	Main Event(s)	Ref.
1.	USWA	Memphis Memories; March 7, 1994	Memphis, Tennessee	Mid-South Coliseum	8,377	Jerry Lawler vs. Austin Idol vs. Brian Christopher vs. Doug Gilbert vs. Eddie Gilbert vs. Jimmy Valiant vs. Koko B. Ware vs. Moondog Spot vs. Terry Funk vs. Tommy Rich in a 10-man elimination match	
2.	SMW	Night of Legends; August 5, 1994	Knoxville, Tennessee	Knoxville Civic Coliseum	5,000	Bob Armstrong, Tracy Smothers and Road Warrior Hawk vs. Bruiser Bedlam and The Funk Brothers (Dory Funk Jr. and Terry Funk)	
—	ICWA	Billy Mack vs. Sonny T October 22, 1994	Ormond Beach, Florida		4,000	Billy Mack vs. Sonny T	
3.	SMW	Sunday Bloody Sunday; February 13, 1994	Knoxville, Tennessee	Knoxville Civic Coliseum	3,950	The Bruise Brothers (Ron Bruise and Don Bruise) vs. The Moondogs (Moondog Rex and Moondog Spot) in a Steel Cage match	
4.	USWA	Sid Vicious vs. The Undertaker; October 17, 1994	Memphis, Tennessee	Mid-South Coliseum	3,103	Sid Vicious (c) vs. The Undertaker for the USWA World Heavyweight Championship	
5.	USWA	Sid Vicious vs. The Undertaker; November 7, 1994	Memphis, Tennessee	Mid-South Coliseum	2,500	Sid Vicious (c) vs. The Undertaker for the USWA World Heavyweight Championship	
6.	SMW	Christmas Chaos; December 25, 1994	Knoxville, Tennessee	Knoxville Civic Coliseum	2,315	The Gangstas (New Jack and Mustafa Saed) (c) vs. The Rock 'n' Roll Express (Ricky Morton and Robert Gibson) for the SMW Tag Team Championship	
7.	SMW	Volunteer Slam III; May 20, 1994	Johnson City, Tennessee	Freedom Hall Civic Center	2,000	Jake Roberts (c) vs. Dirty White Boy for the SMW Heavyweight Championship	
7.	CWA	Tony Atlas vs. Hillbilly Jim; December 3, 1994	Tewksbury, Massachusetts	Tewksbury High School	2,000	Tony Atlas vs. Hillbilly Jim for the CWA Heavyweight Championship	
8.	SMW	Blue Grass Brawl II; April 1, 1994	Pikeville, Kentucky	Pikeville College	1,850	The Heavenly Bodies (Tom Prichard and Jimmy Del Ray) (c) vs. The Rock 'n' Roll Express (Ricky Morton and Robert Gibson) in a Loser Leaves Town Steel Cage match for the SMW Tag Team Championship	
9.	SMW	Fire on the Mountain; August 6, 1994	Johnson City, Tennessee	Freedom Hall Civic Center	1,800	Bob Armstrong, Tracy Smothers and Road Warrior Hawk vs. Bruiser Bedlam and The Funk Brothers (Dory Funk Jr. and Terry Funk) in a Texas Death match	
9.	USWA	Sid Vicious vs. Brian Christopher; December 26, 1994	Memphis, Tennessee	Mid-South Coliseum	1,800	Sid Vicious (c) vs. Brian Christopher for the USWA World Heavyweight Championship	
10.	NWA-ECW	When Worlds Collide; May 14, 1994	Philadelphia, Pennsylvania	ECW Arena	1,558	Sabu and Bobby Eaton vs. Terry Funk and Arn Anderson	

Top 10 most-attended shows in 1995
No.	Promotion	Event	Location	Venue	Attendance	Main Event(s)	Ref.
1.	SMW	Superbowl of Wrestling; August 4, 1995	Knoxville, Tennessee	Knoxville Civic Coliseum	5,000	Shawn Michaels vs. Buddy Landel for the WWF Intercontinental Championship	
2.	—	Stu Hart 50th Anniversary Show; December 15, 1995	Calgary, Alberta	Stampede Corral	4,600	Bret Hart (c) vs. The British Bulldog for the WWF World Heavyweight Championship	
3.	USWA	Memphis Memories II; June 10, 1995	Memphis, Tennessee	Mid-South Coliseum	3,850	12-team Best of Memphis Tag Team Tournament	
4.	JRP	Richard Charland vs. Abdullah the Butcher; July 15, 1995	Montreal, Quebec	Verdun Auditorium	3,500	Richard Charland vs. Abdullah the Butcher	
5.	USWA	USWA vs. SMW; August 7, 1995	Memphis, Tennessee	Mid-South Coliseum	3,000	Jerry Lawler, Billy Jack Haynes, Doug Gilbert, Tommy Rich, Bill Dundee and PG-13 (JC Ice and Wolfie D) vs. Pat Tanaka, Buddy Landel, Gorgeous George III, Robert Gibson, Tracy Smothers and The Heavenly Bodies (Jimmy Del Ray and Tom Prichard) in a 14-man Rage in the Cage match	
5.	CWA	October 1995	Gloucester, Massachusetts		3,000		
6.	SMW	Tennessee Valley Fair; September 15, 1995	Knoxville, Tennessee	Tennessee Valley Fairgrounds	2,500	The Heavenly Bodies (Tom Prichard and Jimmy Del Ray) vs. The THUGS (Tracy Smothers and Dirty White Boy)	
6.	USWA	USWA 25th Anniversary Show; June 11, 1995	Louisville, Kentucky	Louisville Gardens	2,500	Jerry Lawler (c) vs. Joe Leduc for the USWA World Heavyweight Championship	
7.	USWA	Sid Vicious vs. Brian Christopher; January 16, 1995	Memphis, Tennessee	Mid-South Coliseum	2,400	Sid Vicious (c) vs. Brian Christopher for the USWA World Heavyweight Championship	
7.	USWA	USWA vs. SMW; July 24, 1995	Memphis, Tennessee	Mid-South Coliseum	2,400	Buddy Landel, Robert Gibson and Tracy Smothers vs. Tommy Rich, Doug Gilbert and PG-13 (JC Ice and Wolfie D) in a 6-Man Tag Team Texas Death match	
7.	USWA	USWA vs. SMW; July 31, 1995	Memphis, Tennessee	Mid-South Coliseum	2,400	Buddy Landel, Robert Gibson, Tracy Smothers and Terry Gordy vs. Tommy Rich, Doug Gilbert and PG-13 (JC Ice and Wolfie D) in an 8 Man Tag Team Street Fight match	
8.	SMW	Super Saturday Night Fever; January 28, 1995	Knoxville, Tennessee	Knoxville Civic Auditorium	2,000 (Note: There are different reports on the attendance of The Ultimate Return with numbers ranging from 1,250 to 2,000.)		
8.	SMW	Bluegrass Brawl III; April 7, 1995	Pikeville, Kentucky	Pikeville College Gym	2,000	Tracy Smothers and The Undertaker vs. D'Lo Brown and The Gangstas (New Jack and Mustafa Saed) in a Loser Salutes to the Flag Handicap match	
8.	USWA	USWA Championship Wrestling; May 1, 1995 (Note: Aired on tape delay on May 6, 1995.)	Memphis, Tennessee	Mid-South Coliseum	2,000	Razor Ramon (c) vs. Jerry Lawler for the USWA World Heavyweight Championship	
8.	NWC	The Ultimate Return; August 20, 1995	Las Vegas, Nevada	Silver Nugget Pavilion	2,000	The Warrior vs. The Honky Tonk Man	
8.	IWF	Marshfield Fair; August 20, 1995	Marshfield, Massachusetts	Marshfield Fairgrounds	2,000	The Brooklyn Brawler vs. Doink the Clown	
8.	TWWF	Brutus Beefcake vs. Jim Neidhart; September 9, 1995	Ashland, Pennsylvania	North Schuylkill High School	2,000	Brutus Beefcake vs. Jim Neidhart	
9.	SMW	Fire on the Mountain; August 12, 1995	Johnson City, Tennessee	Freedom Hall Civic Center	1,900	The Heavenly Bodies (Tom Prichard and Jimmy Del Ray) (c) vs. The THUGS (Tracy Smothers and Dirty White Boy) for the SMW Tag Team Championship	
9.	IWA	Junkyard Dog & KGB vs. Louie Spicolli & Krusty the Clown; March 4, 1995	Moreno Valley, California		1,900	Junkyard Dog and KGB vs. Louie Spicolli and Krusty the Clown	
10.	AWA	Fabulous Freebirds vs. The Bad Boys; March 4, 1995	Dothan, Alabama		1,825	The Fabulous Freebirds (Michael Hayes and Terry Gordy) vs. The Bad Boys	

Top 10 most-attended shows in 1996
No.	Promotion	Event	Location	Venue	Attendance	Main Event(s)	Ref.
1.	USWA / WWF	USWA vs. WWF; February 17, 1996	Memphis, Tennessee	Mid-South Coliseum	7,500	Bret Hart (c) vs. Jerry Lawler in a Steel Cage match for the WWF World Heavyweight Championship	
2.	Multiple	World Wrestling Peace Festival; June 1, 1996	Los Angeles, California	Los Angeles Sports Arena	5,964	Antonio Inoki and Dan Severn vs. Yoshiaki Fujiwara and Oleg Taktarov	
3.	SWF	Johnny Torres vs. Punk Rock; July 1, 1996	Miami, Florida	Coconut Grove Convention Center	4,400 (Note: Event is described as a "sold show".)	Johnny Torres vs. Punk Rock for the SWF Caribbean Championship	
—	IWF	Marshfield Fair; August 23, 1996	Marshfield, Massachusetts	Marshfield Fairgrounds	3,000	The Bushwhackers (Bushwhacker Butch and Bushwhacker Luke) vs. King Kong Bundy and The Bulldozer	
4.	CWA	Bodyguards vs. Bandits; January 5, 1996	Dallas, Texas	Sportatorium	2,600 (Note: Event is described as "heavily papered".)	The Dallas Bodyguards (Mark Valiant, Scott Putski, Steve Cox, Dom Menaldi and High Voltage (Bo Vegas & Devon Michaels) vs. The Alcatraz Bandits (Alex Porteau, Shawn Summers, John Hawk, Rod Price, Firebreaker Chip and Guido Falcone) in a Football match	
5.	CWA	CWA Mass Madness; July 19, 1996	Revere, Massachusetts	Revere High School	1,850	Kevin Sullivan and The Dungeon Master vs. Jimmy Snuka and Vic Steamboat	
6.	ECW	Heat Wave; July 13, 1996	Philadelphia, Pennsylvania	ECW Arena	1,500	Tommy Dreamer, The Sandman and Terry Gordy vs. Raven's Nest (Raven, Brian Lee and Stevie Richards) in a Rage in a Cage match	
6.	ECW	The Doctor Is In; August 3, 1996	Philadelphia, Pennsylvania	ECW Arena	1,500	Sabu vs. Rob Van Dam in a Stretcher match	
7.	ECW	Natural Born Killaz; August 24, 1996	Philadelphia, Pennsylvania	ECW Arena	1,400	The Gangstas (New Jack and Mustafa Saed) (c) vs. The Eliminators (Saturn and Kronus) in a Steel Cage Weapons match for the ECW World Tag Team Championship	
8.	ECW	High Incident; October 26, 1996	Philadelphia, Pennsylvania	ECW Arena	1,350	Brian Lee vs. Tommy Dreamer in a Scaffold match	
9.	ECW	CyberSlam; February 17, 1996	Philadelphia, Pennsylvania	ECW Arena	1,300	Raven vs. The Sandman	
9.	ECW	Raven vs. The Sandman; December 28, 1996	Allentown, Pennsylvania	Agricultural Hall	1,300	Raven (c) vs. The Sandman in a Dog Collar match for the ECW World Heavyweight Championship	
10.	ECW	Hardcore Heaven; June 22, 1996	Philadelphia, Pennsylvania	ECW Arena	1,250	Sabu vs. Rob Van Dam	
10.	ECCW	ECCW at the VIEX (Day 1); August 17, 1996	Nanaimo, British Columbia	Beban Park	1,250	Mike Roselli (c-ECCW) vs. Michelle Starr (c-NWA) in a Champion vs. Champion match for the ECCW Heavyweight Championship and NWA Vancouver Island Heavyweight Championship	
10.	ECW	When Worlds Collide II; September 14, 1996	Philadelphia, Pennsylvania	ECW Arena	1,250	Brian Lee and The Eliminators (Perry Saturn and John Kronus) vs. Tommy Dreamer, Steve Williams and Terry Gordy	
10.	ECW	November to Remember; November 16, 1996	Philadelphia, Pennsylvania	ECW Arena	1,250	Terry Funk and Tommy Dreamer vs. Shane Douglas and Brian Lee	

Top 10 most-attended shows in 1997
No.	Promotion	Event	Location	Venue	Attendance	Main Event(s)	Ref.
1.	ECW	November to Remember; November 30, 1997	Monaca, Pennsylvania	Golden Dome	4,634	Bam Bam Bigelow (c) vs. Shane Douglas for the ECW World Heavyweight Championship	
2.	ECW	Terry Funk's Wrestlefest; September 11, 1997	Amarillo, Texas	Tri-State Fairgrounds Coliseum	4,000	Terry Funk vs. Bret Hart	
3.	ECW	Sabu vs. Tommy Dreamer; August 2, 1997	Monaca, Pennsylvania	Golden Dome	2,200	Sabu vs. Tommy Dreamer	
4.	WWO	Konnan, Mil Máscaras & Máscara Sagrada vs. Yokozuna, Nikozuna & The Evil Clown; August 10, 1997	Watsonville, California	Santa Cruz County Fairgrounds	2,000	Konnan, Mil Máscaras and Máscara Sagrada vs. Yokozuna, Nikozuna and The Evil Clown	
5.	ECW	Hardcore Heaven; August 17, 1997	Fort Lauderdale, Florida	War Memorial Auditorium	1,950	Sabu (c) vs. Shane Douglas vs. Terry Funk in a Three-Way Dance match for the ECW World Heavyweight Championship	
6.	ECW	The Eliminators vs. The Dudley Boys; May 24, 1997	Monaca, Pennsylvania	Golden Dome	1,926	The Eliminators (Kronus and Saturn) (c) vs. The Dudley Boys (Big Dick Dudley and D-Von Dudley) in a Weapons match for the ECW World Tag Team Championship	
7.	CWA	The Mercenary vs. Curtis Slamdawg; October 11, 1997	Ogdensburg, New York		1,857	The Mercenary vs. Curtis Slamdawg	
8.	ECW	Taz & Tommy Dreamer vs. Rob Van Dam & Sabu; July 26, 1997	Buffalo, New York	Flickinger Center	1,800	Taz and Tommy Dreamer vs. Rob Van Dam and Sabu	
9.	ECW	ECW Hardcore TV; December 13, 1997	Buffalo, New York	Flickinger Center	1,700	Sabu vs. The Sandman in a Death match	
10.	ECW	Buffalo Invasion; May 17, 1997	Buffalo, New York	Flickinger Center	1,697	Terry Funk (c) vs. Big Stevie Cool vs. Raven vs. The Sandman in a Four-Way Dance match for the ECW World Heavyweight Championship	

Top 10 most-attended shows in 1998
No.	Promotion	Event	Location	Venue	Attendance	Main Event(s)	Ref.
—	WXW	Sportsfest; July 12, 1998	Allentown, Pennsylvania	Cedar Beach Park	8,000+ (Note: The Sportsfest event was a free show and/or held at a major public gathering. There are different reports on the attendance of the event with numbers ranging from 6,000 to 10,000.)	The Love Connection (Jay Love and Georgie Love) vs. D'Lo Brown and Owen Hart	
1.	ECW	November to Remember; November 1, 1998	New Orleans, Louisiana	Lakefront Arena	5,800	The Triple Threat (Shane Douglas, Bam Bam Bigelow and Chris Candido) vs. New Triple Threat (Sabu, Rob Van Dam and Taz)	
2.	ECW	Heat Wave; August 2, 1998	Dayton, Ohio	Hara Arena	4,376	Tommy Dreamer, The Sandman and Spike Dudley vs. The Dudleys (Buh Buh Ray Dudley, D-Von Dudley and Big Dick Dudley) in a Street Fight match	
3.	ECW	Living Dangerously; March 1, 1998	Asbury Park, New Jersey	Asbury Park Convention Hall	3,700	The Triple Threat (Shane Douglas and Chris Candido) vs. Al Snow and Lance Storm	
4.	WPW	Jake Roberts vs. Brian Knobs; June 12, 1998	Fort Smith, Arkansas	Harper Stadium	3,500	Jake Roberts vs. Brian Knobs in a Steel Cage match	
4.	MPPW	Jerry Lawler vs. Kane; June 23, 1999	Memphis, Tennessee	Mid-South Coliseum	3,500	Jerry Lawler vs. Kane	
4.	ECW	Tommy Dreamer, New Jack, Spike Dudley & Kronus vs. Justin Credible, Jack Victory, One Man Gang & Big Sal E. Graziano; October 22, 1998	Buffalo, New York	Flickinger Center	3,500	Tommy Dreamer, New Jack, Spike Dudley and Kronus vs. Justin Credible, Jack Victory, One Man Gang and Big Sal E. Graziano in a Death match	
5.	ECW	Sabu & Rob Van Dam vs. The Dudley Boys; September 12, 1998	Pittsburgh, Pennsylvania	David L. Lawrence Convention Center	3,470	Sabu and Rob Van Dam (c) vs. The Dudley Boys (Bubba Ray Dudley and D-Von Dudley) for the ECW World Tag Team Championship	
6.	ECW	Wrestlepalooza; May 3, 1998	Marietta, Georgia	Cobb County Civic Center	3,401	Shane Douglas (c) vs. Al Snow for the ECW World Heavyweight Championship	
7.	ECW	Tommy Dreamer, New Jack, Spike Dudley & Kronus vs. Justin Credible, Jack Victory, One Man Gang & Big Sal E. Graziano; October 23, 1998	Pittsburgh, Pennsylvania	David L. Lawrence Convention Center	3,374	Tommy Dreamer, New Jack, Spike Dudley and Kronus vs. Justin Credible, Jack Victory, One Man Gang and Big Sal E. Graziano in a Death match	
8.	ECW	The Dudley Boys vs. The Sandman, Tommy Dreamer & Spike Dudley; May 9, 1998	Buffalo, New York	Flickinger Center	3,241	The Dudley Boys (Bubba Ray Dudley, D-Von Dudley and Big Dick Dudley) vs. The Sandman, Tommy Dreamer and Spike Dudley	
—	NDW	Bobby Fulton vs. Demolition Ax; May 15, 1998	Columbia, South Carolina	Capital City Stadium	2,977	Bobby Fulton vs. Demolition Ax	
—	NDW	Rock 'n' Roll Express vs. The Assassins; August 21, 1998	Jacksonville, Florida	Wolfson Park	2,563 (Note: This was part of a post-game show for an MLB game between the Jacksonville Suns vs. West Tenn Diamond Jaxx)	The Rock 'n' Roll Express (Ricky Morton and Robert Gibson) vs. The Assassins (Assassin #1 and Assassin #2)	
9.	BBOW	Jake Roberts & Chris Adams vs. Greg Valentine & Blazing Inferno; March 7, 1998	Lubbock, Texas	Lubbock Municipal Coliseum	2,500	Jake Roberts and Chris Adams vs. Greg Valentine and Blazing Inferno	
9.	WCW	Mike Anthony vs. Bob Backlund; May 16, 1998	Cicero, Illinois	Olympic Theatre	2,500	Mike Anthony vs. Bob Backlund	
9.	MPPW	Jerry Lawler vs. Giant King; July 21, 1998	Memphis, Tennessee	Mid-South Coliseum	2,500	Jerry Lawler vs. Giant King	
9.	MPPW	Jerry Lawler vs. Billy Travis & Randy Hales; September 7, 1998	Memphis, Tennessee	Sun Dome	2,500	Jerry Lawler vs. Billy Travis and Randy Hales	
10.	FCW	Joe DeFuria vs. Hack Myers; July 18, 1998	Hialeah, Florida	Opalocka-Hialeah Flea Market	2,000	Joe DeFuria vs. Hack Myers for the FCW Heavyweight Championship	

Top 10 most-attended shows in 1999
No.	Promotion	Event	Location	Venue	Attendance	Main Event(s)	Ref.
—	NWA-NE	WRKO's Taste of the Boss; September 25, 1999	Boston, Massachusetts	Boston City Hall Plaza	35,000	5-0 (Trooper Gilmore and Corporal Johnson) vs. Victor Rivera and Jay Kobain	
—	NWF	Clark County Fair: Summer's Best Party; August 6, 1999	Vancouver, Washington	Clark County Fairgrounds	4,000	Greg Valentine vs. The Grappler	
1.	ECW	Living Dangerously; March 21, 1999	Asbury Park, New Jersey	Asbury Park Convention Hall	3,900	Taz (WHC) vs. Sabu (FTW) in an Extreme Death match to unify the ECW and FTW World Heavyweight Championships	
2.	—	Championship Wrestling; September 17, 1999	Little Rock, Arkansas	Barton Coliseum	3,500		
3.	BBOW	Road Tour; March 13, 1999	Kearney, Nebraska		3,200	Greg Valentine (c) vs. The Honky Tonk Man for the BBOW Heavyweight Championship	
3.	ISPW	Summertime Blues Tour (Day 6); August 19, 1999	Wildwood, New Jersey	Wildwood Convention Hall	3,200	Ace Darling (c) vs. Axl Rotten and Chris Candido in a 3-way Ladder match for the ISPW Heavyweight Championship	
4.	ECW	Sabu & Rob Van Dam vs. The Dudley Boys; February 13, 1999	Poughkeepsie, New York	Mid-Hudson Civic Center	3,000	Sabu and Rob Van Dam (c) vs. The Dudley Boys (Bubba Ray Dudley and D-Von Dudley) for the ECW World Tag Team Championship	
4.	ECW	ECW Hardcore TV; June 17, 1999	Villa Park, Illinois	Odeum Sports & Expo Center	3,000	Rob Van Dam (c) vs. Lance Storm for the ECW World Television Championship	
5.	ECW	ECW Hardcore TV; January 23, 1999	Detroit, Michigan	Michigan State Fairgrounds Coliseum	2,900	Tommy Dreamer vs. Justin Credible vs. Lance Storm in a Three-Way Dance match	
—	NDW	Manny Fernandez & Rick Link vs. The Assassins; June 18, 1999	Jacksonville, Florida	Wolfson Park	2,882 (Note: This was part of a post-game show for an MLB game between the Jacksonville Suns vs. Mobile BayBears)	Manny Fernandez and Rick Link vs. The Assassins (Assassin #1 and Assassin #2)	
6.	WES	All-Star Wrestling; May 8, 1999	New Rochelle, New York	Mulcahy Center	2,600	Jake Roberts and The Shark Attack Kid vs. The Pitbulls (Pitbull #1 and Pitbull #2)	
6.	Lutte 2000	L'Union Fait La Force IV; December 29, 1999	Montreal, Quebec	Centre Pierre Charbonneau	2,600	The Fabulous Rougeaus (Jacques Rougeau and Raymond Rougeau) vs. The Garvin Brothers (Ron Garvin and Jimmy Garvin) for the Johnny Rougeau Memorial Tag Team Championship	
—	NDW	Manny Fernandez & Ricky Morton vs. Cham Pain & Otto Schwanz; June 10, 1999	Kinston, North Carolina	Grainger Stadium	2,459 (Note: This was part of a post-game show for an MLB game between the Kinston Indians vs. Winston-Salem Warthogs)	Manny Fernandez and Ricky Morton vs. Cham Pain and Otto Schwanz	
7.	NAWA	Slam Jam; May 20, 1999	White Plains, New York		2,481	Battle Royal for the inaugural NAWA Heavyweight Championship	
8.	—	Heroes of Wrestling; October 10, 1999	Bay St. Louis, Mississippi	Casino Magic	2,300	Jim Neidhart and King Kong Bundy vs. Jake Roberts and Yokozuna	
9.	Lutte 2000	L'Union Fait la Force; February 14, 1999	Montreal, Quebec	Pierre-Charbonneau Arena	2,200	14-man Battle Royal	
10.	Lutte 2000	L'Union Fait La Force III; August 9, 1999	Montreal, Quebec	Pierre-Charbonneau Arena	2,100	Jacques Rougeau Sr. and The Fabulous Rougeaus (Jacques Rougeau and Raymond Rougeau) vs. Michel DuBois and The Garvin Brothers (Ron Garvin and Jimmy Garvin)	

=== 2000s ===
Note: Ring of Honor became a national touring company in 2003 and began holding regular pay-per-view (PPV) events via the Dish Network starting with Respect Is Earned on July 1, 2007. ROH was acknowledged as the third major U.S. promotion following its national television deal with the Sinclair Broadcasting Group in May 2011.

Top 10 most-attended shows in 2000
No.	Promotion	Event	Location	Venue	Attendance	Main Event(s)	Ref.
1.	Lutte 2000	Pierre Carl Ouellet vs. King Kong Bundy; December 29, 2000	Verdun, Quebec	Verdun Auditorium	4,000	Pierre Carl Ouellet vs. King Kong Bundy	
—	WWO	Mil Mascaras, Perro Aguayo & Mascara Sagrada vs. Rey Misterio Sr., Yokozuna & Headshrinker Fatu; September 9, 2000	Anaheim, California	Edison Field	3,700 (Note: This was part of a post-game show for an MLB game between the Anaheim Angels vs. Baltimore Orioles.)	Mil Mascaras, Perro Aguayo and Mascara Sagrada vs. Rey Misterio Sr., Yokozuna and Headshrinker Fatu	
2.	NOTP	Night of Thunder; February 12, 2000	Winnipeg, Manitoba	Convention Centre	3,000	Chi Chi Cruz vs. Scott D'Amore	
2.	NWA / WWA	USO Middle East-PACRIM Tour (Day 6); April 7, 2000	Eskan Village, Saudi Arabia	Eskan Airforce Base	3,000	American Eagle vs. Bunkhouse Buck	
2.	JCW	StrangleMania Tour; April 26, 2000	Philadelphia, Pennsylvania	Electric Factory	3,000	Vampiro and The Insane Clown Posse (Shaggy 2 Dope and Violent J) vs. The Rainbow Coalition (Big Flame, Bob and Neil)	
2.	OVW	Rockin' Rumble; June 23, 2000	Louisville, Kentucky	Louisville Gardens	3,000	The Damaja and Kane vs. Rob Conway and D'Lo Brown with special referee Mick Foley	
3.	NWA-MACW	USO Middle East-PACRIM Tour (Day 13); April 19, 2000	Okinawa, Japan	Kadena Air Base	2,500	Big Bubba Pain and L.A. Stephens vs. xXx (Curtis Thompson and Drake Dawson) for the NWA World Tag Team Championship	
3.	—	K-Town Smackdown; May 26, 2000	Knoxville, Tennessee	Chilhowee Park	2,500	The Rock 'n' Roll Express (Ricky Morton and Robert Gibson) vs. The Headbangers (Mosh and Thrasher)	
—	BCW	Rumble on the River; July 15, 2000	Windsor, Ontario	Riverfront Terrace	2,200	Sabu (c) vs. Geza Kalman for the BCW Can-Am Heavyweight Championship	
4.	NWA-MACW / WWA	USO Middle East-PACRIM Tour (Day 2); March 31, 2000	Doha, Kuwait		2,000	The Bushwhackers (Bushwhacker Butch and Bushwacker Luke) vs. The Main Event (Reno Riggins and Steven Dunn)	
4.	WCW	Battle of the Belts 12; May 20, 2000	Hammond, Indiana	Hammond Civic Center	2,000	120-man Battle Royal	
4.	HWA	Brian Pillman Memorial Show; May 25, 2000	Cincinnati, Ohio	Schmidt Fieldhouse	2,000	Eddie Guerrero and D'Lo Brown vs. The Radicalz (Dean Malenko and Perry Saturn)	
4.	Lutte 2000	Jacques Rougeau Jr. vs. Serge Rolland; July 15, 2000	Drummondville, Quebec	Marcel Dionne Arena	2,000	Jacques Rougeau Jr. vs. Serge Rolland	
—	NWA-MACW / WWA	USO Middle East-PACRIM Tour (Day 1); March 30, 2000	Doha, Kuwait		1,800	Craig Pittman vs. Bubba Bain	
—	FCW	Duke Droese vs. Alex G July 6, 2000	Miami, Florida	Boys and Girls Club	1,800	Duke Droese vs. Alex G	
—	NWA-MACW / WWA	Tatanka vs. The Barbarian; September 19, 2000	North Pole, Alaska	Eielson Air Force Base	1,600	Tatanka vs. The Barbarian	
5.	MCW	Jerry Lawler vs. Curtis Hughes; February 18, 2000	Blytheville, Arkansas	National Guard Armory	1,500	Jerry Lawler vs. Curtis Hughes	
5.	NWA-MACW	USO Middle East-PACRIM Tour (Day 7); April 12, 2000	Waegwan, South Korea	Camp Carroll	1,500	The Main Event (Reno Riggins and Steven Dunn) (c) vs. The Rock 'n' Roll Express (Ricky Morton and Robert Gibson) for the NWA World Tag Team Championship	
5.	NWA-MACW	USO Middle East-PACRIM Tour (Day 12); April 17, 2000	Osan, South Korea	Osan Air Force Base	1,500	The Rock 'n' Roll Express (Ricky Morton and Robert Gibson) (c) vs. Big Bubba Pain and L.A. Stephens for the NWA World Tag Team Championship	
5.	WXW	Gary Albright Memorial Show; April 19, 2000	Allentown, Pennsylvania	Agricultural Hall	1,500	Rikishi Phatu vs. Road Dogg	
5.	NWA / WWA	Tatanka vs. The Barbarian; September 16, 2000	Fairbanks, Alaska	Eielson Air Force Base	1,500	Tatanka vs. The Barbarian	
6.	ECWA	Battle at the Bob; November 25, 2000	Newark, Delaware	Bob Carpenter Center	1,471	JJ The Ring Crew Guy (c) vs. The Cheetah Master for the ECWA Heavyweight Championship	
7.	—	K-Town Smackdown; June 2, 2000	Knoxville, Tennessee	Chilhowee Park	1,400	The Rock 'n' Roll Express (Ricky Morton and Robert Gibson) vs. Jimmy Golden and Dirty White Boy	
8.	MCW	Shane Shamrock Memorial Cup; July 19, 2000	Glen Burnie, Maryland	Michael's 8th Avenue	1,311	12-man Shane Shamrock Memorial Cup tournament	
9.	HWF	February Frenzy; February 19, 2000	Barrie, Ontario	Molson Center	1,200	El Tornado vs. Tyson Dux	
9.	XPW	And Then There Were Four; April 15, 2000	Los Angeles, California	Los Angeles Sports Arena	1,200	Chris Candido (c) vs. Shane Douglas for the XPW World Heavyweight Championship	
10.	ASW	All Star Wrestling Explosion; January 22, 2000	Tokio, North Dakota	Spirit Lake Casino & Resort	1,100 (Note: Go Funk Yourself is described as "heavily papered".)	Tatanka vs. King Kong Bundy	
10.	XPW	Go Funk Yourself; July 22, 2000	Los Angeles, California	Los Angeles Sports Arena	1,100	Sabu vs. Terry Funk for the XPW World Heavyweight Championship	

Top 10 most-attended shows in 2001
No.	Promotion	Event	Location	Venue	Attendance	Main Event(s)	Ref.
1.	Lutte 2000	Pierre Carl Ouellet vs. Kurrgan; December 30, 2001	Montreal, Quebec	Centre Bell	5,500+	Pierre Carl Ouellet vs. Kurrgan with special referee Sid Vicious	
2.	NWA-OVW	Christmas Chaos; January 31, 2001	Louisville, Kentucky	Louisville Gardens	5,010	Leviathan vs. Kane	
3.	—	Clash of the Legends; June 15, 2001	Memphis, Tennessee	Mid-South Coliseum	4,600+	Jerry Lawler vs. Lord Humongous with Lance Russell as special referee	
4.	WPW	Mil Mascaras, Atlantis & Super Parka vs. Universo 2000, Mascara Ano 2000 & Blue Panther; July 21, 2001	Los Angeles, California	Grand Olympic Auditorium	3,500+	Mil Mascaras, Atlantis and Super Parka vs. Universo 2000, Mascara Ano 2000 and Blue Panther	
5.	NWA-OVW	Last Dance; June 27, 2001	Louisville, Kentucky	Louisville Gardens	3,000	Leviathan and Diamond Dallas Page vs. Kane and The Undertaker	
6.	WCPW	Battle of the Belts 13; May 26, 2001	Hammond, Indiana	Hammond Civic Center	2,500	Terry Allen (c) vs. Rob Van Dam for the WCPW League Championship	
6.	HWA	Brian Pillman Memorial Show; August 9, 2001	Oak Hill, Ohio	Oak Hill High School	2,500	The Hardy Boyz (Matt Hardy and Jeff Hardy) (WWF) vs. Edge & Christian (WWF) vs. Diamond Dallas Page and Kanyon (WCW) in a three-way match	
7.	MCW / PPW	Corinth Chaos; January 13, 2001	Corinth, Mississippi	Crossroads Arena	2,000+ (Note: There are different reports on the attendance of Anarchy at Piper's Pit with numbers ranging from 2,000 to 2,500.)	Too Cool (Grandmaster Sexay and Scotty 2 Hotty) vs. The Mean Street Posse (Pete Gas and Rodney)	
7.	—	Anarchy at Piper's Pit; May 11, 2001	Eugene, Oregon	McArthur Court	2,000+	20-man Royal Rumble	
8.	CZW	Cage of Death III; December 15, 2001	Philadelphia, Pennsylvania	CZW Arena	1,900	Justice Pain (c) vs. Wifebeater in a Cage of Death match for the CZW World Heavyweight Championship	
9.	ISW	Alaska Superslam (Day 2); October 22, 2001	Fairbanks, Alaska	Carlson Center	1,400	Road Warrior Animal and Jim Duggan vs. Julio Dinero and Chris Hamrick	
10.	BCW	Wrestlefest; July 14, 2001	Windsor, Ontario	Riverside Front Civic Terrace	1,155	Mikey Whipwreck (c) vs. El Tornado for the BCW Can-Am Heavyweight Championship	

Top 10 most-attended shows in 2002
No.	Promotion	Event	Location	Venue	Attendance	Main Event(s)	Ref.
—	Lutte 2000	Alouettes Mania I August 25, 2002	Montreal, Quebec	Stade Percival-Molson	20,000	Jacques Rougeau vs. King Kong Bundy	
—	NEPW	Lake County Fair; August 24, 2002	Painesville, Ohio	Lake County Fairgrounds	5,000	Julio Dinero vs. Dick Trimmins	
1.	FOW	FOW 4th Anniversary Bash; April 13, 2002	Davie, Florida	Bergeron Rodeo Arena	3,019	Dusty Rhodes vs. Kevin Sullivan vs. Terry Funk vs. Abdullah The Butcher in a Four-Way Dance	
—	AWA	San Diego County Fair; July 7, 2002	San Diego, California	Del Mar Fairgrounds	2,200	Evan Karagias (c) vs. Horshu for the AWA World Heavyweight Championship	
2.	OVW	Spring Breakout; April 5, 2002	Louisville, Kentucky	Six Flags Kentucky Kingdom	2,000	Ric Flair and David Flair vs. Bolin Services (The Prototype and Sean O'Haire)	
3.	MCW	MCW Rage TV; March 27, 2002	Glen Burnie, Maryland	Michael's 8th Avenue	1,627	Gillberg and Steve Wilkos vs. The Slackers (Chad Bowman and Dino Divine)	
4.	OVW	Six Flags Summer Sizzler Series; June 14, 2002	Louisville, Kentucky	Six Flags Kentucky Kingdom	1,600	Nova and Jerry Lawler vs. Bolin Services (The Prototype and Sean O'Haire)	
5.	PCW	Commencement of Cool; March 3, 2002	Winnipeg, Manitoba	Investors Group Athletic Center	1,531 (Note: There are different reports on the attendance of the event with numbers ranging from 1,531 to 1,700.)	Will Damon vs. Eddie Guerrero	
6.	FOW	Norman Smiley vs. Billy Fives; June 29, 2002	Davie, Florida	Bergeron Rodeo Arena	1,506	Norman Smiley (c) vs. Billy Fives for the FOW Heavyweight Championship	
7.	XPW	Freefall; February 23, 2002	Los Angeles, California	Grand Olympic Auditorium	1,500	New Jack vs. Vic Grimes in a Freefall match	
8.	NWA-MACW	Rikki Nelson vs. Hardcore Holly; January 12, 2002	South Boston, Virginia	Halifax County High School	1,277	Rikki Nelson vs. Hardcore Holly	
9.	MCW	MCW Rage TV; January 30, 2002	Glen Burnie, Maryland	Michael's 8th Avenue	1,200	Adam Flash vs. Eddy Guerrero	
9.	KBB	Matsuri Mass Mayhem; April 6, 2002	Boston, Massachusetts	Massachusetts College of Art	1,200	Uchu Chu (c) vs. Silver Potato for the Kaiju Grand Championship	
9.	PCW	Boiling Point; July 25, 2002	Winnipeg, Manitoba	CanWest Global Park	1,200	Chad Tatum (c) vs. Rawskillz for the PCW Junior Heavyweight Championship	
10.	BCW	Wrestlefest; August 15, 2002	Oldcastle, Ontario	Ciociaro Club	1,167	Jerry Lawler vs. Johnny Swinger	

Top 10 most-attended shows in 2003
No.	Promotion	Event	Location	Venue	Attendance	Main Event(s)	Ref.
—	Lutte 2000	Alouettes Mania II; July 12, 2003	Montreal, Quebec	Stade Percival-Molson	20,000	The Fabulous Rougeaus (Jacques Rougeau and Raymond Rougeau) vs. The Nasty Boys (Brian Knobbs and Jerry Sags)	
—	IWR	Warped Tour 2002; August 3, 2003	Pontiac, Michigan	Pontiac Silverdome	19,000	Deranged vs. Tommy Starr in a UV Light Tube Death match	
—	HWA	BaseBrawl; July 19, 2003	Columbus, Ohio	Cooper Stadium	8,757	Rory Fox (c) vs. Shark Boy for the HWA Cruiserweight Championship	
—	IWC	Big Butler Fair; June 28, 2003	Prospect, Pennsylvania	Big Butler Fairgrounds	6,000	Dusty Rhodes vs. Jerry Lawler	
1.	NWA-MACW	The Next Revolution (Day 1); December 30, 2003	Guangzhou, China	Tianhe Gymnasium	7,500	Terry Taylor (c) vs. Steve Williams for the NWA Mid-Atlantic Heavyweight Championship	
2.	WLLL	WLLL Debut Show; September 28, 2003	Duluth, Georgia	Gwinnett Civic Center Arena	4,000	El Hijo del Santo and La Parka vs. Pentagon and Felino	
3.	EWF	The Patriot vs. Bo Cooper; May 24, 2003	Lytle Creek, California	Mountain Lakes Resort	2,000	The Patriot vs. Bo Cooper	
4.	MW / XWF	Rumble at the Roundhouse; August 2, 2003	Memphis, Tennessee	Mid-South Coliseum	1,900	20-man Steel Cage Battle Royal	
5.	LVV	Lucha VaVoom 3 June 26, 2003	Los Angeles, California	Mayan Theatre	1,600	El Hijo del Santo, Chilango and Felino vs. Blue Panther, Gringo Loco and Misterioso	
6.	MLW	Hybrid Hell; June 20, 2003	Fort Lauderdale, Florida	War Memorial Auditorium	1,536	Satoshi Kojima (c) vs. Mike Awesome for the MLW World Heavyweight Championship	
7.	ROH	Final Battle; December 27, 2003	Philadelphia, Pennsylvania	National Guard Armory	1,500	Keiji Muto and Arashi (c) vs. The Prophecy (Christopher Daniels and Dan Maff) for the AJPW World Tag Team Championship	
8.	LVV	Lucha VaVoom 2 February 13, 2003	Los Angeles, California	Mayan Theater	1,300	Blue Demon Jr., La Parka and Neutron Jr. vs. Medico Asesino Jr., Dr. O'Brien and Caronte 2000	
9.	OVW	Spring Breakout; April 11, 2003	Louisville, Kentucky	Six Flags Kentucky Kingdom	1,200	Nick Dinsmore, Johnny Jeter and Chris Benoit vs. Rob Conway, The Damaja and Doug Basham in a 30-minute Iron Man match	
9.	ROH	Death Before Dishonor; July 19, 2003	Elizabeth, New Jersey	Rex Plex	1,200	Samoa Joe (c) vs. Paul London for the ROH World Championship	
9.	MCW	Jerry Lawler, Buddy Landel & Jimmy Valiant vs. Bill Dundee, Mabel & Jimmy Hart; September 28, 2003	Memphis, Tennessee	Mid-South Coliseum	1,200	Jerry Lawler, Buddy Landel and Jimmy Valiant vs. Bill Dundee, Mabel and Jimmy Hart	
9.	Lutte 2000	Luttemania; December 27, 2003	Laval, Quebec	Colisée de Laval	1,200	Eric Mastrocola and Handsome J.F. (c) vs. The Fabulous Rougeaus (Jacques Rougeau and Raymond Rougeau) for the Lutte 2000 Tag Team Championship	
10.	FWA / ROH	Frontiers of Honor; May 17, 2003	London, England	York Hall	1,100	10-man ROH vs. FWA Challenge series	
10.	MCW	Shane Shamrock Memorial Cup; July 16, 2003	Glen Burnie, Maryland	Michael's 8th Avenue	1,100	12-man Shane Shamrock Memorial Cup tournament	
10.	MW	A Fight for a King; November 29, 2003	Memphis, Tennessee	Mid-South Coliseum	1,100	Jerry Lawler and Brian Christopher vs. Dutch Mantel and Doug Gilbert	
10.	IWC	Call To Arms; December 12, 2003	Johnstown, Pennsylvania	Cambria County War Memorial Arena	1,100	Jerry Lawler vs. Dusty Rhodes with special referee Mick Foley	

Top 10 most-attended shows in 2004
No.	Promotion	Event	Location	Venue	Attendance	Main Event(s)	Ref.
—	LF	Alouettes Mania III; July 15, 2004	Montreal, Quebec	Stade Percival-Molson	20,000	Jacques Rougeau vs. Kamala	
1.	NWA-MACW	The Next Revolution (Day 2); January 1, 2004	Guangzhou, China	Huadu Stadium	6,100	Steve Williams (c) vs. Terry Taylor for the NWA Mid-Atlantic Heavyweight Championship	
2.	WXW	Sportsfest; July 9, 2004	Allentown, Pennsylvania	Cedar Beach Park	5,000	Rapid Fire Maldonado (c) vs. Mana the Polynesian Warrior for the WXW Heavyweight Championship	
2.	MW	Throwback Night II; August 28, 2004	Memphis, Tennessee	Mid-South Coliseum	5,000	Jerry Lawler and Jimmy Hart vs. Terry Funk and Corey Maclin with special referee Jimmy Valiant	
3.	EWF / TKA	Samoan Flag Day Celebration; August 27, 2004	Carson, California	Victoria Park	4,700	Tonga Kid vs. Greg Valentine	
4.	MW	Throwback Night; July 10, 2004	Memphis, Tennessee	Mid-South Coliseum	3,758	Jerry Lawler and Jimmy Hart vs. Corey Maclin and Kamala	
5.	MW	Throwback Night III: A Nightmare in Memphis; October 30, 2004	Memphis, Tennessee	Mid-South Coliseum	3,500	Jerry Lawler and The Rock 'n' Roll Express (Ricky Morton and Robert Gibson) vs. Corey Maclin, Stan Lane and Jackie Fargo	
—	HWA	BaseBrawl; May 15, 2004	Columbus, Ohio	Cooper Stadium	3,000+ (Note: This was part of a post-game show for an MLB game between the Columbus Clippers vs. Buffalo Bisons.)	Rory Fox (c) vs. Nigel McGuiness in a non-title match for the HWA Heavyweight Championship	
6.	NWA-MACW	The Next Revolution (Day 3); January 3, 2004	Guangzhou, China	Guangzhou Gymnasium	3,400	Battle royal	
7.	UPW	Destruction in the Desert; October 30, 2004	Primm, Nevada	Star of the Desert Arena	2,500	Rikishi and Skulu vs. Jack Bull and Hollywood Yates	
8.	NCW	NCW in Saint-Pascal; July 23, 2004	Saint-Pascal, Quebec		2,000	Brick Crawford, Chakal and Sunny War Cloud vs. Chase Ironside, Jake Matthews & Mad Dog Reaper	
9.	LVV	Lucha VaVoom 5: Valentine's Massacre II - Love Hurts; February 12, 2004	Los Angeles, California	Mayan Theatre	1,800	Los Cadetes del Espacio (Solar, Super Astro and Ultraman) vs. Kayam, La Morgue and Misterioso	
9.	ROH	At Our Best; March 13, 2004	Elizabeth, New Jersey	Rex Plex	1,800	Samoa Joe (c) vs. Jay Briscoe in a Steel Cage match for the ROH World Championship	
9.	LF	Jacques Rougeau's Super Wrestling Family Gala; April 8, 2004	Joliette, Quebec		1,800	Jacques Rougeau vs. King Kong Bundy	
9.	NEW	Renegades Rampage; October 2, 2004	Fishkill, New York	Dutchess Stadium	1,800	Jerry Lawler and Al Snow vs. Chris Candido and D'Lo Brown with special referee Mick Foley	
9.	—	Throwback Night IV: Holiday Throwback; December 26, 2004	Memphis, Tennessee	Mid-South Coliseum	1,800	Jerry Lawler and Jimmy Hart vs. Corey Maclin and Eugene in a Steel Cage match	
10.	LVV	Lucha VaVoom 7: Mad Mexi Monster Party; October 28, 2004	Los Angeles, California	Mayan Theatre	1,600	El Santo and Blue Demon Jr. vs. Felino and Super Parka	
10.	—	VCU Children's Hospital Benefit Show; October 30, 2004	Richmond, Virginia		1,600	The Fantastics (Bobby Fulton and Tommy Rogers) vs. The Midnight Express (Dennis Condrey and Bobby Eaton)	

Top 10 most-attended shows in 2005
No.	Promotion	Event	Location	Venue	Attendance	Main Event(s)	Ref.
—	LF	Alouettes Mania IV; July 8, 2005	Montreal, Quebec	Stade Percival-Molson	20,000	Jim Duggan vs. Kurrgan with special referee Jacques Rougeau	
1.	FCW	Pride; September 24, 2005	Inglewood, California	Great Western Forum	5,500	Blue Demon Jr., El Hijo del Santo, Mil Mascaras and Tinieblas vs. Dr. Wagner Jr., Scorpio Jr. and Los Guerreros del Infierno (Rey Bucanero and Ultimo Guerrero)	
2.	NWA-FL	The War On I-4; April 9, 2005	Tampa, Florida	St. Pete Times Forum	3,000	Bruce Steele (c) vs. Jerry Lawler for the NWA Florida Heavyweight Championship	
2.	CWF-MA	Southeastern Import Showdown II; February 6, 2005	Greensboro, North Carolina	Greensboro Coliseum	3,000	Ric Converse (c) vs. Brad Attitude for the AWA Mid-Atlantic Heavyweight Championship	
3.	—	Throwback Night V February 26, 2005	Memphis, Tennessee	Mid-South Coliseum	2,300	Jerry Lawler and Jimmy Hart vs. Corey Maclin and Mabel	
4.	LVV	Lucha VaVoom 8: Real Tough Love; February 10, 2005	Los Angeles, California	Mayan Theatre	2,000	Dr. Wagner Jr. and Nicho el Millonario vs. Blue Demon Jr. and Rey Misterio Sr.	
4.	CCW	A Tribute To Starrcade; November 19, 2005	Spartanburg, South Carolina	Spartanburg Memorial Auditorium	2,000	Dusty Rhodes vs. Tully Blanchard with special referee Jimmy Valiant	
5.	CCW	The Hardcore Legend; March 12, 2005	Lenoir, North Carolina	Mulberry Recreation Center	1,900 (Note: There are different reports on the attendance of The Hardcore Legend event with numbers ranging from "nearly 2,000" to 2,300.)	Dusty Rhodes vs. Abdullah the Butcher with special referee Mick Foley	
5.	CFE	Beach Bash; March 5, 2005	Myrtle Beach, South Carolina	Conway High School	1,900	Jimmy Snuka vs. Greg Valentine in a Steel Cage match with special referee Mick Foley	
6.	BCW	New Years Revolution: Doug Chevalier Memorial Show; January 21, 2005	Oldcastle, Ontario	Ciociaro Club	1,800	Alex Shelley (c) vs. Chris Sabin for the BCW Can-Am Television Championship with special referee Mick Foley	
7.	PWA	The Main Event; November 11, 2005	Dix Hills, New York	Upper Room World Center	1,700+ (Note: There are different reports on the attendance of the event with numbers ranging from 1,700 to 3,000.)	Jim Duggan and Tito Santana vs. The Dream Team (Brutus Beefcake and Greg Valentine)	
8.	CCW	Dusty Rhodes vs. Tully Blanchard; January 8, 2005	Lenoir, North Carolina	Mulberry Recreation Center	1,600	Dusty Rhodes vs. Tully Blanchard	
8.	FMLL	El Hijo del Santo & Atlantis vs. Psicosis & Villano III; January 22, 2005	Chicago, Illinois	Congress Theater	1,600	El Hijo del Santo and Atlantis vs. Psicosis and Villano III	
9.	CCW	The Brawl To Settle It All; May 7, 2005	Gaffney, South Carolina	Gaffney Middle School	1,550	Dusty Rhodes vs. Terry Funk in a Falls Count Anywhere Bunkhouse match	
10.	NWA-WB	The Homecoming; April 8, 2005	Birmingham, Alabama	Zamora Shrine Temple	1,500	Jeff Jarrett (c) vs. Road Dogg for the NWA World Heavyweight Championship	

Top 10 most-attended shows in 2006
No.	Promotion	Event	Location	Venue	Attendance	Main Event(s)	Ref.
—	WPW	OC Fair: Flower Power (Day 2); July 23, 2006	Costa Mesa, California	Washington Mutual Arena	12,000	El Hijo del Santo, Lil Cholo and Silver Tyger vs. Infernal, Super Kendo 2 and Super Parka	
—	WPW	OC Fair: Flower Power (Day 1); July 22, 2006	Costa Mesa, California	Washington Mutual Arena	10,000	El Hijo del Santo, Lil Cholo and Silver Tyger vs. Infernal, Super Kendo 2 and Super Parka	
1.	TNT-PW / WFP	HOG-A-MANIA; April 29, 2006	Staunton, Virginia	Shenandoah-Harley Davidson Buell	3,000 (Note: There are different reports on the attendance of The Wrestling Summit with numbers ranging from 3,000 to 3,800.)	The New Age Outlaws (Road Dogg and Billy Gunn) vs. The Steiner Brothers (Rick Steiner and Scott Steiner) in a Steel Cage match	
1.	NWA-PRO	The Wrestling Summit; September 22, 2006	Paradise, Nevada	Orleans Arena	3,000	Adam Pearce vs. Frankie Kazarian	
2.	FMLL	LA Park & Místico vs Dr. Wagner Jr. & Rey Bucanero; January 29, 2006	Chicago, Illinois	Congress Theater	2,500	L.A. Park and Mistico vs. Dr. Wagner Jr. and Rey Bucanero	
3.	OVW	Six Flags Summer Sizzler Series; July 14, 2006	Louisville, Kentucky	Paramarx Arena	2,000	The Gang Stars (The Neighborhoodie and Shad Gaspard) (c) vs. Los Locos (Ramon and Raul), The Untouchables (Deuce and Domino), Eddie Craven & Shawn Osbourne, Aaron Stevens & Kasey James, Chad Toland & Pat Buck, Elijah Burke & Shawn Spears, and Mo Sexton & TJ Dalton in a Gauntlet match for the OVW Southern Tag Team Championship	
3.	—	Legends of Wrestling; July 27, 2006	Somerset, Kentucky	Pulaski County Fairgrounds	2,000	Jim Duggan vs. King Kong Bundy	
3.	FCW	Dominacion; November 18, 2006	Anaheim, California	Anaheim Convention Center	2,000	16-man tag team tournament	
4.	AWA	Rowdymania; March 31, 2006	Casa Grande, Arizona	Pinal County Fairgrounds	1,863	The Henchmen (Big Buddah and JT Wolfen) (c) vs. Adrenalyn and G.Q Gallo in a Fatal Four-Way match for the AWA World Tag Team Championship	
5.	ROH	Unified; August 12, 2006	Liverpool, England	Liverpool Olympia	1,700	Bryan Danielson (c-WC) vs. Nigel McGuinness (c-PC) in a unification match for the ROH World Championship and ROH Pure Championship	
6.	ECPW	Aiden Berges Benefit Show; March 16, 2006	Suffern, New York	Suffern High School	1,540	Jeff Coleman (c) vs. Red Hot Russ for the ECPW Heavyweight Championship	
7.	ROH	Better Than Our Best; April 1, 2006	Chicago Ridge, Illinois	Frontier Fieldhouse	1,500	Bryan Danielson (c) vs. Lance Storm for the ROH World Championship	
7.	SCW	Ring Wars; June 24, 2006	Cocoa Beach, Florida	Expo Sports Center Arena	1,500	Scott Steiner vs. Monty Brown	
7.	APW	King City; May 19, 2006	King City, California	Salinas Valley Fairgrounds	1,500	Rey Misterio vs. La Migra #3	
7.	OVW	Six Flags Summer Sizzler Series; August 11, 2006	Louisville, Kentucky	Paramarx Arena	1,500	Al Snow vs. Simon Dean	
7.	DSW	Park Slam; September 9, 2006	Austell, Georgia	Six Flags Over Georgia	1,500	Ric Flair vs. MVP	
8.	ROH	Final Battle; December 23, 2006	New York City, New York	Manhattan Center	1,300	Bryan Danielson (c) vs. Homicide for the ROH World Championship	
9.	—	Macomb Mayhem; February 18, 2006	Macomb, Illinois		1,200	Short Sleeve Sampson vs. Pitbull Patterson	
9.	PPW	Bash at the Beach; March 11, 2006	Menasha, Wisconsin	Waverly Beach	1,200	Jim Duggan vs. Cobra	
9.	NEW	Wrestlefest X March 25, 2006	Bristol, Connecticut	Bristol Arena	1,200	Christian Cage (c) vs. Billy Kidman for the NWA World Heavyweight Championship	
9.	TNT-PW / WFP	Strive for Excellence Tour; May 14, 2006	Spotsylvania, Virginia	Courtland High School	1,200	The Steiner Brothers (Rick Steiner and Scott Steiner) vs The Midnight Express (Dennis Condrey and Bobby Eaton) in a Steel Cage match	
9.	NEW	Spring Slam (Day 1); June 1, 2006	Newburgh, New York	Newburgh Free Academy	1,200	Christian Cage (c) vs. Abyss for the NWA World Heavyweight Championship	
9.	ROH	Glory by Honor V: Night 2 September 16, 2006	New York City, New York	Manhattan Center	1,200	Bryan Danielson (c) vs. KENTA for the ROH World Championship	
9.	PWA	Christmas Chaos; December 21, 2006	Pasadena, Texas	Pasadena Convention Center	1,200	Booker T vs. Charlie Haas	
10.	ROH	Supercard of Honor; March 31, 2006	Chicago Ridge, Illinois	Frontier Fieldhouse	1,100	Bryan Danielson (c) vs. Roderick Strong for the ROH World Championship	
10.	BTW	Killer Kowalski Tribute Show; April 15, 2006	Lynn, Massachusetts	Lynn Armory	1,100	Dusty Rhodes vs. Steve Corino in a Texas Bullrope match	
10.	ROH	Death Before Dishonor IV; July 15, 2006	Philadelphia, Pennsylvania	National Guard Armory	1,100	Team ROH (Samoa Joe, Adam Pearce, B. J. Whitmer, Ace Steel and Homicide) vs. Team CZW (Chris Hero, Claudio Castagnoli, Necro Butcher, Nate Webb and Eddie Kingston) in a Cage of Death	

Top 10 most-attended shows in 2007
No.	Promotion	Event	Location	Venue	Attendance	Main Event(s)	Ref.
1.	JCW	Bloodymania; August 11, 2007	Cave-In-Rock, Illinois	Hatchet Landings	5,800	Sabu and The Insane Clown Posse (Shaggy 2 Dope and Violent J) vs. Trent Acid and The Young Altar Boys (Young Altar Boy #1 and Young Altar Boy #4)	
—	ASW	DukesFest 2007; June 2, 2007	Nashville, Tennessee	Music City Motorplex	5,000	Iron Cross, Bobby Houston and Jerry Lawler vs. Stan Lee, Eddie Golden and K.C. Thunder	
2.	—	Clash of the Legends; April 27, 2007	Memphis, Tennessee	FedEx Forum	4,500+ (Note: There are different reports on the attendance of the event with numbers ranging from 4,500 to 6,000.)	Hulk Hogan vs. Paul Wight	
3.	OVW	Six Flags Summer Sizzler Series; July 27, 2007	Louisville, Kentucky	Davis Arena	3,000	Jerry Lawler vs. Kasey James in a No Disqualification match	
4.	NEW	Electric City Slam; November 3, 2007	Scranton, Pennsylvania	Lackawanna College	2,800	Jerry Lawler vs. Joey Matthews	
5.	JCW	Tempest Release Party Tour (Day 6); March 2, 2007	Denver, Colorado	Fillmore Auditorium	2,000 (Note: God Bless Fort Benning was a free show and/or held at a major public gathering.)	Juggalo World Order (2 Tuff Tony and Corporal Robinson) vs. Disciples of Death (Mad Man Pondo and Necro Butcher)	
5.	JCW	Tempest Release Party Tour (Day 7); March 3, 2007	Salt Lake City, Utah	Salt Palace	2,000	Corporal Robinson (c) vs. Tracy Smothers and Trent Acid in a Three-Way Dance for the JCW Heavyweight Championship	
5.	GCW	God Bless Fort Benning; November 17, 2007	Columbus, Georgia	10th Street	2,000	10-man Battle Royal	
5.	LF	Jacques Rougeau's Super Wrestling Family Gala; December 29, 2007	Verdun, Quebec	Verdun Auditorium	2,000	Jacques Rougeau vs. Kurrgan	
6.	NEW	WrestleFest XI; April 22, 2007	Bristol, Connecticut	Bristol Central High School	1,800	Christian Cage (c) vs. Samoa Joe for the NWA World Heavyweight Championship	
7.	JCW	Tempest Release Party Tour (Day 19); March 17, 2007	Worcester, Massachusetts	Worcester Palladium	1,700 (Note: There are different reports on the attendance of SuperEx Showdown with numbers ranging from 1,700 to 3,500.)	Juggalo World Order (2 Tuff Tony and Corporal Robinson) vs. Disciples of Death (Mad Man Pondo and Necro Butcher)	
7.	ROH	Driven; June 23, 2007	Chicago Ridge, Illinois	Frontier Fieldhouse	1,700	Bryan Danielson vs. Nigel McGuinness	
7.	—	SuperEX Showdown: When Legends Collide; August 23, 2007	Ottawa, Ontario	Ottawa SuperEX	1,700	PCO vs. AJ Styles vs. Christian Cage in a Three-Way Dance	
8.	NEW	Autumn Ambush; October 27, 2007	Milford, Pennsylvania	Delaware Valley High School	1,500	Jerry Lawler vs. Julio Dinero	
9.	JCW	Tempest Release Party Tour (Day 9); March 5, 2007	Las Vegas, Nevada	Fort Cheyenne Casino	1,400	Mad Man Pondo vs. Zach Gowen	
10.	IWC	Night of Legends 3 March 24, 2007	Franklin, Pennsylvania	Franklin Area High School	1,300+	Tito Santana vs. Greg Valentine	

Top 10 most-attended shows in 2008
No.	Promotion	Event	Location	Venue	Attendance	Main Event(s)	Ref.
1.	NWA-OF / NWA-PE	NWA Wrestling Showcase; April 4, 2008	Newark, New Jersey	JFK Recreation Center	4,500	Judas Young (c) vs. Tom Brandi for the NWA Pro East Heavyweight Championship	
2.	LF	Jacques Rougeau's Super Wrestling Family Gala; December 27, 2008	Verdun, Quebec	Verdun Auditorium	4,300	Jacques Rougeau Jr. and J.J. Rougeau (c) vs. Eric Mastrocola and Taloche the Clown for the Johnny Rougeau Tag Team Championship	
3.	FMLL	L.A. Par-K & Rey Misterio vs. Dr. Wagner Jr. & El Infernal; January 26, 2008	Chicago, Illinois	Congress Theatre	3,000	L.A. Par-K and Rey Misterio vs. Dr. Wagner Jr. and El Infernal	
3.	NWA-PRO / HDCW	Summer Bash; July 4, 2008	Edwards, California	Edwards Air Force Base	3,000	The MEGAmerican vs. Mikey Nicholls	
3.	OVW	Six Flags Summer Sizzler Series; July 18, 2008	Louisville, Kentucky	Paramarx Arena	3,000	John Cena vs. Lance Cade	
4.	NWA	NWA 60th Anniversary Show; June 7, 2008	Atlanta, Georgia	Philips Arena	2,500	The Rock 'n' Roll Express (Ricky Morton and Robert Gibson) vs. The Midnight Express (Dennis Condrey and Bobby Eaton)	
5.	ROH	A New Level; May 10, 2008	New York City, New York	Hammerstein Ballroom	2,300	Nigel McGuinness (c) vs. Claudio Castagnoli for the ROH World Championship	
6.	GLCW	Blizzard Brawl 4 December 5, 2008	Milwaukee, Wisconsin	Waukesha Expo Center	2,000	Jerry Lawler and Lance Allen vs. Al Snow and Steve Feifer	
7.	NWA / NWA-ECCW	NWA 60th Anniversary Tour; November 1, 2008	Penticton, British Columbia	South Okanagan Event Centre	1,800+ (Note: There are different reports on the attendance of event with numbers ranging from 1,200 to 2,000.)	Kevin Nash vs. Lance Cade	
8.	WCPW	Battle of the Belts XX; May 17, 2008	Cicero, Illinois	Cicero Stadium	1,600	Austin Roberts (c-HW) vs. Sean Mulligan (c-LG) vs. Acid Jaz (c-BK) in a Three-Way Unification match for the WCPW Heavyweight Championship, WCPW League Championship and WCPW Bare Knuckles Championship	
9.	APW	Pequeno Deluto & Pierrothito vs. Mascarita Sagrada & Octagoncito; February 2, 2008	Santa Maria, California	Santa Maria High School	1,500	Pequeno Deluto and Pierrothito vs. Mascarita Sagrada and Octagoncito	
9.	LVV	Lucha VaVoom 17: Love Is In The Air (Day 1); February 12, 2008	Los Angeles, California	Mayan Theatre	1,500	Cassandro, El Chupacabra and Incognito vs. Magno, Puma and Shamu Jr.	
9.	LVV	Lucha VaVoom 17: Love Is In The Air (Day 2); February 13, 2008	Los Angeles, California	Mayan Theatre	1,500	El Chupacabra and Shamu Jr. vs. Human Tornado and Incognito	
9.	LVV	Lucha VaVoom 17: Love Is In The Air (Day 3); February 14, 2008	Los Angeles, California	Mayan Theatre	1,500	Cassandro, Mini-Chicken and Xochitl vs. Kissing Bandit, Kissing Bandita & Kissing Bandito	
9.	ROH	Supercard of Honor III; March 29, 2008	Orlando, Florida	Orlando Downtown Recreation Complex	1,500	Typhoon (CIMA, Dragon Kid and Ryo Saito) vs. Muscle Outlaw'z (Naruki Doi, Masato Yoshino and Genki Horiguchi) in a Dragon Gate rules match	
9.	NEW	Spring Slam III; April 18, 2008	Newburgh, New York	Newburgh Free Academy	1,500	Xavier (c) vs. Jason Blade for the NEW Heavyweight Championship	
9.	ROH	Rising Above; November 22, 2008	Chicago Ridge, Illinois	Frontier Fieldhouse	1,500	Nigel McGuinness (c) vs. Bryan Danielson for the ROH World Championship	
10.	IWC	A Night of Legends; April 12, 2008	Franklin, Pennsylvania	Franklin Area High School	1,470	Abdullah the Butcher vs. Tommy Rich	

Top 10 most-attended shows in 2009
No.	Promotion	Event	Location	Venue	Attendance	Main Event(s)	Ref.
1.	LF	Jacques Rougeau's Super Wrestling Family Gala; December 27, 2009	Verdun, Quebec	Verdun Auditorium	3,500	Jacques Rougeau and Giant Martin vs. Kurrgan and Eric Mastrocola	
2.	NWA-MACW	New Years Bash; January 10, 2009	Easley, South Carolina	Easley High School	2,600	Buff Bagwell (c) vs. Rikki Nelson for the NWA Mid-Atlantic Heavyweight Championship	
3.	BSE	Welcome to Mexico! (Day 1); July 18, 2009	Toronto, Ontario	Harbourfront Centre	2,500	James Champagne, La Sombra and The KGB vs. Incógnito, Xtremo and Blue Demon Jr.	
4.	ROH	Take No Prisoners; April 4, 2009	Houston, Texas	George R. Brown Convention Center	2,000	Jerry Lynn (c) vs. Bryan Danielson vs. D'Lo Brown vs. Erick Stevens in a Four-way match for the ROH World Championship	
4.	DCW	United We Stand; April 7, 2009	Smyrna, Delaware	Smyrna Municipal Park	2,000	20-man Freedom Battle Royal	
4.	BSE	Welcome to Mexico! (Day 2); July 19, 2009	Toronto, Ontario	Harbourfront Centre	2,000	Tyson Dux and Ash vs. Blue Demon Jr. and Ángel de Guerra	
5.	ROH	Supercard of Honor IV; April 3, 2009	Houston, Texas	George R. Brown Convention Center	1,800	Nigel McGuinness (c) vs. Jerry Lynn for the ROH World Championship	
6.	NWA-MACW	Night of Champions; February 21, 2009	Cheraw, South Carolina	Cheraw High School	1,700	David Flair and Ricky Morton vs. Buff Bagwell and Rikki Nelson	
7.	BTW	Danburymania; March 27, 2009	Danbury, Connecticut	Danbury Arena	1,687	John Walters (c) vs. Jay Lethal for the BTW Heavyweight Championship with special referee Ric Flair	
8.	NEW	Hart Attack; November 13, 2009	Waterbury, Connecticut	Crosby High School	1,600	Jason Blade (c) vs. Paul London for the NEW Heavyweight Championship	
9.	GLCW	Two Words/Two Sweet; March 21, 2009	Waukesha, Wisconsin	County Expo Center	1,500 (Note: There are different reports on the attendance of GNW's Wrestling Supershow with numbers ranging from 1,500 to 1,900.)	Al Snow (c) vs. Armando Estrada for the GLCW Heavyweight Championship	
9.	IWC	Night of Legends; March 28, 2009	Franklin, Pennsylvania	Rocky Grove High School	1,500	Jim Duggan vs. The One Man Gang	
9.	GNW	Wrestling Supershow; June 18, 2009	Thunder Bay, Ontario	Fort William Gardens	1,500	Jim Duggan vs. Sid Vicious	
9.	NWA-MACW	Summer Bash; July 11, 2009	Anderson, South Carolina	McCants Middle School	1,500	Buff Bagwell (c) vs. JW Boss for the NWA Mid-Atlantic Heavyweight Championship	
9.	PWO	Wrestlelution 2: A Coming of Age; August 9, 2009	Cleveland, Ohio	Nautica Pavilion	1,500	Josh Prohibition (c) vs. Johnny Gargano in a No-DQ match for the PWO Heavyweight Championship	
9.	LF	Jacques Rougeau's Super Wrestling Family Gala; December 26, 2009	Verdun, Quebec	Verdun Auditorium	1,500	Jacques Rougeau and Giant Martin vs. Kurrgan and Eric Mastrocola	
10.	ROH	Manhattan Mayhem III; June 13, 2009	New York City, New York	Hammerstein Ballroom	1,450	Jerry Lynn (c) vs. Austin Aries vs. Tyler Black in a Three-Way Dance for the ROH World Championship with special enforcer Nigel McGuinness	

=== 2010s ===
Top 10 most-attended shows in 2010
No.	Promotion	Event	Location	Venue	Attendance	Main Event(s)	Ref.
1.	JCW	Bloodymania IV; August 15, 2010	Cave-In-Rock, Illinois	Hog Rock	3,000	Corporal Robinson (c) vs. Mike Knox and Raven in a Three-Way Dance for the JCW Heavyweight Championship	
1.	LF	Jacques Rougeau Jr. Retirement Tour (Day 1); December 28, 2010	Montréal, Quebec	Verdun Auditorium	3,000	Jacques Rougeau Jr. and J.J. Rougeau vs. Eric Mastrocola and Sylver	
2.	JCW	Happy Daze Tour (Day 16); May 27, 2010	Council Bluffs, Iowa	Westfair Amphitheater	2,000	Mad Man Pondo (c) vs. Donnie Peppercricket for the JCW Heavyweight Championship	
2.	LLUSA	Lucha Libre USA: Masked Warriors; August 7, 2010	Las Vegas, Nevada	Thomas & Mack Center	2,000	Carlitos and The Puerto Rican Powers (PR Flyer and San Juan Kid) vs. La Dinastía (Neutronic, El Oriental and Tinieblas Jr.)	
2.	WPW	Dan Severn vs. Butterbean; December 4, 2010	Mount Pleasant, Michigan		2,000	Dan Severn vs. Butterbean	
3.	TOW	TOW #5; March 5, 2010	Montreal, Quebec	Centre Pierre Charbonneau	1,800 (Note: There are different reports on the attendance of the Superstars of Wrestling show with numbers ranging from 1,800 to 2,000.)	Darkko (c) vs. Sylvain Grenier vs. Dru Onyx in a Three-Way Casket match for the CRW Quebec Championship	
3.	GNW	Superstars of Wrestling; May 15, 2010	Thunder Bay, Ontario	Fort William Gardens	1,800	Kevin Nash vs. Hannibal with special referee Terry Funk	
4.	NEW	WrestleFest XIV; March 20, 2010	Poughkeepsie, New York	Mid-Hudson Civic Center	1,781	Booker T vs. Mr. Anderson	
5.	JCW	Oddball Bonanza; March 20, 2010	Philadelphia, Pennsylvania	Electric Factory	1,748	Corporal Robinson (c) vs. Mad Man Pondo for the JCW Heavyweight Championship	
6.	TOW	TOW #7; September 24, 2010	Montreal, Quebec	Centre Pierre Charbonneau	1,500	Hurricane Helms and Sylvain Grenier vs. Dru Onyx and Shelton Benjamin	
6.	CZW	Cage of Death XII; December 11, 2010	Philadelphia, Pennsylvania	Asylum Arena	1,500	Danny Havoc, Devon Moore, Dysfunction and Scotty Vortekz vs. Cult Fiction (Brain Damage, MASADA, tHURTeen and Drake Younger) in a Cage of Death match	
7.	IWC	Night of Legends; April 10, 2010	Franklin, Pennsylvania	Franklin Area High School	1,462	David Sammartino vs. Larry Zbyszko	
8.	NEW	Spring Slam; April 23, 2010	Newburgh, New York	Newburgh Free Academy	1,400	Jeff Hardy and Shannon Moore vs. Brian Anthony and Rob Eckos	
8.	NEW	Brass City Brawl; October 1, 2010	Waterbury, Connecticut	Crosby High School	1,400	Bryan Danielson vs. Shelton Benjamin	
9.	ROH	Supercard of Honor V May 8, 2010	New York City, New York	Manhattan Center	1,300	Tyler Black (c) vs. Roderick Strong for the ROH World Championship	
10.	POWW	Summer in the Park; July 25, 2010	Cicero, Illinois	Cicero Community Park	1,300	Brandon Bishop (c) vs. Rex Hart for the POWW World Championship	
10.	ROH	Final Battle; December 18, 2010	New York City, New York	Manhattan Center	1,300	Unsanctioned Fight Without Honor for El Generico's mask vs. Kevin Steen leaving ROH	

Top 10 most-attended shows in 2011
No.	Promotion	Event	Location	Venue	Attendance	Main Event(s)	Ref.
1.	JCW	Hatchet Attacks; March 26, 2011	Southgate, Michigan	The Modern Exchange	4,311	Corporal Robinson (c) vs. Ian Rotten in a Barbed Wire, Tables, Ladders & Glass match for the JCW Heavyweight Championship	
2.	CWI	Brawl at the Bush II; May 14, 2011	Brantford, Ontario	Brantford Civic Center	3,600	Haven, Lanny Poffo, Brutus Beefcake and Bushwhacker Luke vs. Big Daddy Hammer, Virgil and The Nasty Boys (Brian Knobbs and Jerry Sags) in a Survivor Series elimination match	
3.	—	LuchaMania USA Tour; January 23, 2011	Chicago, Illinois	Congress Theatre	3,000	El Hijo del Santo and El Hijo del Rey Misterio vs. Imágen Nocturna and Piloto Suicida	
4.	—	Lucha Libre Mexicana; March 20, 2011	Chicago, Illinois	Congress Theatre	2,900	El Hijo del Cobarde and Hysteria Extreme vs. Latin-O and La Máscara	
5.	NWA-MACW	Halifax County Bash; January 29, 2011	South Boston, Virginia	Halifax County High School	2,300	Buff Bagwell vs. Rikki Nelson	
6.	NWA-PWR	Santa Cruz County Fair; September 18, 2011	Watsonville, California	Santa Cruz County Fairgrounds	2,000	Oliver John vs. Kafu	
6.	AWE	Night of Legends; October 15, 2011	Fishersville, Virginia	Augusta Expo Center	2,000	Ricky Morton vs. Kevin Nash in a No Disqualification match with special referee Ronnie Garvin	
7.	NEW	Autumn Ambush; October 1, 2011	Poughkeepsie, New York	Mid-Hudson Civic Center	1,781	Hale Collins vs. Vik Dalishus with special enforcer Bret Hart	
8.	NEW	WrestleFest XV; January 15, 2011	Poughkeepsie, New York	Mid-Hudson Civic Center	1,700	Matt Hardy vs. MVP	
8.	Crossfire	Tribute to the Fairgrounds; January 29, 2011	Nashville, Tennessee	Tennessee State Fairgrounds Arena	1,700	Jerry Lawler vs. Bill Dundee with special referee Dutch Mantell	
9.	JCW	New Year's Ninja Party; December 31, 2011	Worcester, Massachusetts	Worcester Palladium	1,674	2 Tuff Tony and Shockwave the Robot vs. The Headbangers (Mosh and Thrasher)	
10.	NEW	Spring Slam; April 15, 2011	Newburgh, New York	Newburgh Free Academy	1,550	Matt Taven (c) vs. Hale Collins in a No Disqualification match for the NEW Heavyweight Championship	

Top 10 most-attended shows in 2012
No.	Promotion	Event	Location	Venue	Attendance	Main Event(s)	Ref.
1.	BBWF	Caribbean Wrestling Bash: The Legends Tour; September 9, 2012	San Nicolas, Aruba	Joe Laveist Ballpark	11,000	Scott Steiner vs. Billy Gunn for the Aruba Wrestling Bash Championship	
2.	BBWF	Caribbean Wrestling Bash: The Legends Tour; September 8, 2012	San Nicolas, Aruba	Joe Laveist Ballpark	9,000	Scott Steiner vs. Kevin Nash	
3.	JCW	BloodyMania VI; August 12, 2012	Cave-in-Rock, Illinois	Hog Rock	3,100	2 Tuff Tony (c) vs. Kongo Kong for the JCW Heavyweight Championship	
4.	NEW	Wrestling Under The Stars; September 22, 2012	Fishkill, New York	Dutchess Stadium	2,500	Goldust and Joe Ausanio vs. Luke Robinson and Romeo Roselli	
5.	NEW	Wrestlefest 16; March 23, 2012	Poughkeepsie, New York	Mid-Hudson Civic Center	2,112	John Hennigan vs. Finlay	
6.	ER	Extreme Reunion; April 28, 2012	Philadelphia, Pennsylvania	National Guard Armory	2,100	Shane Douglas vs. Too Cold Scorpio	
7.	Crossfire	Once in a Lifetime Opportunity; August 4, 2012	Nashville, Tennessee	Tennessee State Fairgrounds Arena	2,000	6-man tournament for the inaugural Crossfire Heavyweight Championship	
8.	HOH	House of Hardcore; October 6, 2012	Poughkeepsie, New York	Mid-Hudson Civic Center	1,900	Tommy Dreamer (c) vs. Carlito vs. Mike Knox in a Three-Way Dance for the FWE Heavyweight Championship	
9.	WCE	WrestleCade; November 25, 2012	Winston-Salem, North Carolina	Benton Convention Center	1,800	Matt Hardy vs. Gunner in a 30-minute Iron Man match	
10.	—	Lucha Libre Live; April 28, 2012	El Paso, Texas	The Coliseum	1,500	Máscara Dorada and Atlantis vs. Último Guerrero and Mephisto	
10.	NWA-PRO / NWA-PWR	Santa Clara County Fair; August 5, 2012	San Jose, California	Santa Clara County Fairgrounds	1,500	Los Luchas (Phoenix Star and Zokre) vs. El Hijo del Rey Misterio and El Ultimo Panda	

Top 10 most-attended shows in 2013
No.	Promotion	Event	Location	Venue	Attendance	Main Event(s)	Ref.
1.	FMLL	LuchaMania USA Tour (Day 1); January 26, 2013	Los Angeles, California	Los Angeles Memorial Sports Arena	4,000+ (Note: There are different reports on the attendance of the event with numbers ranging from 4,000 to 7,000.)	Blue Demon Jr., Cien Caras Jr. and Dr. Wagner Jr. vs. El Hijo del Santo, L.A. Par-K and Rayo de Jalisco Jr. in a six-man tag team match	
2.	FMLL	LuchaMania USA Tour (Day 2); February 17, 2013	Chicago, Illinois	Congress Theatre	3,500	Blue Demon Jr., Imágen Nocturna and Piloto Suicida vs. L.A. Par-K, El Hijo del Santo and Rayo de Jalisco Jr.	
2.	BBOW	Wrestln', Wreckn’ & Racn’ November 9, 2013	Casper, Wyoming	Casper Events Center	3,500	Angel (c) vs. Chaos for the BBOW Heavyweight Championship	
3.	VPW	Melee Tour (Day 1); May 18, 2013	King City, California	Salinas Valley Fairgrounds	2,020	Matt Hardy vs. Shannon Ballard	
4.	NWA-SM	NWA Smoky Mountain TV; April 6, 2013	Elizabethton, Tennessee	Elizabethton High School	2,017	The Illuminati (Chris Richards and Tony Givens) (c) vs. Air America (Gavin Darring and Skylar Kruze) for the NWA Tennessee Tag Team Championship	
5.	FMLL	Idolos Del Ring Tour: El Paso; April 14, 2013	El Paso, Texas	The Coliseum	2,000	Atlantis and LA Par-K vs. Dr. Wagner Jr. and Ultimo Guerrero	
6.	HOH	HOH 3 November 9, 2013	Poughkeepsie, New York	Mid-Hudson Civic Center	1,600	Tommy Dreamer and Terry Funk vs. X-Pac and Lance Storm	
7.	LLUSA	United We Stand Tour; April 14, 2013	Ontario, California	Citizens Business Bank Arena	1,500+ (Note: There are different reports on the attendance of the event with numbers ranging from 1,500 to 1,550.)	Blue Demon Jr. and Solar vs. R. J. Brewer and Jon Rekon	
7.	LLUSA	United We Stand Tour; April 19, 2013	Houston, Texas	Funplex Entertainment Center	1,500	Blue Demon Jr. and Solar vs. RJ Brewer and Robbie Gilmore	
8.	—	SlamFest; May 4, 2013	Cookeville, Tennessee	Tennessee Technological University	1,400	Brian Christopher and Rikishi vs. 2 Tuff Tony and Tommy Dreamer	
9.	HOH	HOH II; June 22, 2013	Philadelphia, Pennsylvania	National Guard Armory	1,300	Tommy Dreamer vs. Lance Storm	
10.	CHIKARA	The Shoulder of Pallas; April 6, 2013	Secaucus, New Jersey	Meadowlands Expo Center	1,260	Jushin Thunder Liger and Mike Quackenbush vs. Jigsaw and The Shard	

Top 10 most-attended shows in 2014
No.	Promotion	Event	Location	Venue	Attendance	Main Event(s)	Ref.
1.	WWN	WWNLive in China (Day 4); November 16, 2014	Beijing, China	Cadillac Arena	10,500	Ricochet (c) vs. Johnny Gargano for the Open the Freedom Gate Championship	
2.	WWN	WWNLive in China (Day 3); November 14, 2014	Leshan, China	Emei Sport Hall	2,500+	Trent Barreta (c) vs. Rich Swann for the FIP World Heavyweight Championship	
2.	WCE	WrestleCade; November 29, 2014	Winston-Salem, North Carolina	Benton Convention Center	2,500+	Matt Hardy (c) vs. Drew Galloway in a Last Man Standing match for the WrestleCade Championship	
3.	BTW	WrestleFest; May 17, 2014	Newark, California	Newark Memorial High School	2,000	Bad Influence (Christopher Daniels and Kazarian) vs. Ryan Von Kool and Victor Sterling	
3.	VPW	Melee Tour; May 17, 2014	King City, California	Salinas Valley Fairgrounds	2,000	Chavo Guerrero Jr. vs. Rik Luxury	
4.	NEW	Wrestlefest 18; March 28, 2014	Waterbury, Connecticut	Crosby High School	1,887	Matt Hardy vs. AJ Styles	
5.	BTW	BTW Spring Tour (Day 1); February 28, 2014	Spartanburg, South Carolina	Spartanburg Memorial Auditorium	1,600	Matt Hardy vs. CW Anderson	
5.	BTW	BTW Spring Tour (Day 2); March 1, 2014	Prince George, Virginia	Prince George High School	1,600	Matt Hardy vs. Christian York	
6.	WP	Supercard; June 7, 2014	Rahway, New Jersey	Rahway Recreation Center	1,591	Dan Maff vs. Star Man in a Maffs Madness match	
7.	HOW	Legendary; August 23, 2014	Red Cliff, Wisconsin	Legendary Waters Resort & Casino	1,500	Arya Daivari (c) vs. Lance Hoyt vs. Trevor Murdoch in a Three-Way Dance for the HOW Undisputed Championship	
7.	WWN	WWNLive in China (Day 2); November 12, 2014	Chengdu, China	Wen Jiang Sport Center	1,500	AR Fox, Rich Swann and Ricochet vs. Chuck Taylor, Fire Ant and Silver Ant	
8.	CHIKARA	You Only Live Twice; May 25, 2014	Easton, Pennsylvania	Palmer Center	1,497	Eddie Kingston (c) vs. Icarus for the Chikara Grand Championship	
9.	CWF	CoastalMania VI; July 12, 2014	Galveston, Texas	Galveston Island Convention Center	1,300	The New Von Erichs (Ross Von Erich and Marshall Von Erich) vs. The Crimson Dynasty (Al Farat and Akbar Farat) with special referee James Beard	
10.	MCW	Tag Wars; March 22, 2014	Joppa, Maryland	Joppa Marketplace	1,200 (Note: There are different reports on the attendance of HOH IV with numbers ranging from 1,200 to 1,500.)	Jake Roberts, Adam Flash and Ronnie Zukko vs. Mustafa Aziz Daniels, Mitch Miller and Paul White	
10.	IWC	Night of the Superstars 3 April 12, 2014	Meadville, Pennsylvania	Meadville Area High School	1,200	AJ Styles vs. Anthony Nese	
10.	GNW	Hannibal TV; May 10, 2014	Smiths Falls, Ontario	Smiths Falls Memorial Center	1,200	Sexxxy Eddy vs. The Honky Tonk Man	
10.	HOH	HOH IV; June 6, 2014	Poughkeepsie, New York	Mid-Hudson Civic Center	1,200	Tommy Dreamer and Devon vs. Abyss and Rhino in an Extreme Hardcore War match	
10.	HOH	HOH V June 7, 2014	Philadelphia, Pennsylvania	National Guard Armory	1,200	AJ Styles vs. Kevin Steen	
10.	NWA	Summer Clash; July 14, 2014	Benton, Arkansas	Saline County Fairgrounds	1,200	Byron Wilcott (c) vs. Tim Storm for the NWA North American Heavyweight Championship	
10.	NEW	Wrestling Under The Stars 3 August 2, 2014	Wappingers Falls, New York	Dutchess Stadium	1,200	The Hardy Boyz (Jeff Hardy and Matt Hardy) vs. The Young Bucks (Matt Jackson and Nick Jackson)	

Top 10 most-attended shows in 2015
No.	Promotion	Event	Location	Venue	Attendance	Main Event(s)	Ref.
1.	JCW	Take Me Home Charity Show; February 21, 2015	Detroit, Michigan	Detroit Masonic Temple	4,500	2 Tuff Tony (c) vs. The Weedman for the JCW Heavyweight Championship	
2.	NEW	Wrestling Under The Stars (Day 1); August 1, 2015	Wappingers Falls, New York	Dutchess Stadium	3,341	Rey Mysterio Jr. and Alberto El Patrón vs. The Young Bucks (Matt Jackson and Nick Jackson)	
3.	BTW / LOW	Legends of Wrestling; June 7, 2015	New York City, New York	CitiField	3,000 (Note: There are different reports on the attendance of Legends of Wrestling with numbers ranging from 2,600 to 3,000.)	Rob Van Dam vs. Scott Steiner	
3.	GFW	One Night Only: Amped Anthology - Part 1 July 24, 2015	Las Vegas, Nevada	Orleans Arena	3,000	8-man tournament for the inaugural GFW Global Championship	
3.	WCE	WrestleCade; November 28, 2015	Winston-Salem, North Carolina	Benton Convention Center	3,000	Matt Hardy (c) vs. Jeff Jarrett for the WrestleCade Championship	
4.	NEW	NEW 20th Anniversary Show; November 13, 2015	Waterbury, Connecticut	Wilby High School	2,300	Matt Hardy vs. Rey Mysterio Jr.	
5.	NEW	Wrestlefest 19; March 6, 2015	Waterbury, Connecticut	Crosby High School	2,113	Matt Hardy and Alberto El Patrón vs. The Young Bucks (Matt Jackson and Nick Jackson)	
6.	GFW	One Night Only: Amped Anthology - Part 4 October 23, 2015	Las Vegas, Nevada	Orleans Arena	2,109	8-man tournament for the inaugural GFW Global Championship	
7.	2CW	Living On The Edge X (Day 1); April 4, 2015	Watertown, New York	SUNY Jefferson Community College Gym	2,000	Nick Ando (c) vs. Sean Carr in a Tables, Ladders & Chairs match for the 2CW Heavyweight Championship	
7.	NEW	Wrestling Under The Stars (Day 2); August 2, 2015	Lowell, Massachusetts	Lelacheur Park	2,000	Matt Hardy vs. Rey Mysterio Jr. vs. Alberto El Patrón in a Three-Way Dance	
7.	GLCW	Blizzard Brawl 11; December 5, 2015	Waukesha, Wisconsin	County Expo Center	2,000	Abyss vs. David Herro in a Monster's Ball match	
8.	BTW	Rock 'n' Roll Express vs. Danny Miles & Jake Manning; February 22, 2015	Bluefield, West Virginia	Brush Fork National Guard Armory	1,974	The Rock 'n' Roll Express (Ricky Morton and Robert Gibson) vs. Danny Miles and Jake Manning	
9.	HOH	HOH TV#1; May 12, 2015	Poughkeepsie, New York	Mid-Hudson Civic Center	1,900	Paul London and Brian Kendrick vs. The Young Bucks (Matt Jackson and Nick Jackson)	
9.	HOH	HOH TV#2; May 20, 2015	Poughkeepsie, New York	Mid-Hudson Civic Center	1,900	Tommy Dreamer (c) vs. Carlito vs. Mike Knox in a Three-Way Dance for the FWE Heavyweight Championship	
9.	JAPW	JAPW 19th Anniversary Show; November 14, 2015	Rahway, New Jersey	Rahway Recreation Center	1,900	Rey Mysterio Jr. vs. Low-Ki	
10.	BTW	Ray Idol & Rock 'n' Roll Express vs. Danny Miles, Jake Manning & Zane Riley; February 20, 2015	Bristol, Tennessee	Vance Middle School	1,588	Ray Idol and The Rock 'n' Roll Express (Ricky Morton and Robert Gibson) vs. Danny Miles, Jake Manning and Zane Riley	

Top 10 most-attended shows in 2016
No.	Promotion	Event	Location	Venue	Attendance	Main Event(s)	Ref.
1.	WCE	WrestleCade 5: The Final 3 Count; November 26, 2016	Winston-Salem, North Carolina	Benton Convention Center	4,000	Matt Hardy (c) vs. Ryback for the WrestleCade Championship	
—	LU	Austin Warfare; March 15, 2016	Austin, Texas	Austin Music Hall	3,500 (Note: Event was a free show and/or held at a major public gathering.)	Cage, Prince Puma and Rey Mysterio Jr. vs. Jack Evans, Johnny Mundo and P. J. Black	
2.	NEW	Wrestling Under The Stars 5 August 27, 2016	Wappingers Falls, New York	Dutchess Stadium	2,800+ (Note: There are different reports on the attendance of the event with numbers ranging from 2,800 to 3,000.)	Cody Rhodes vs. Kurt Angle	
3.	NEW	Wrestling Under The Stars Tour: Pittsfield (Day 3); August 26, 2016	Pittsfield, Massachusetts	Wahconah Park	2,300	Brother Nero vs. Brian Anthony	
4.	HoG	HoG 6th Anniversary Show; December 17, 2016	New York City, New York	NYC Arena	2,109	The Hardys (Matt Hardy and Jeff Hardy) (c) vs. The Dudley Boyz (D-Von Dudley and Bubba Ray Dudley), EYFBO (Mike Draztik and Angel Ortiz) and Private Party (Isiah Kassidy and Marq Quen) in a Four-Way Dance for the HoG Tag Team Championship	
5.	PWE	Clash of the Titans; October 22, 2016	Harrisburg, Pennsylvania	Zembo Shine	2,000	Eddie Smooth vs. Facade vs. Jason Gory vs. Kai Katana vs. László Árpád vs. Sean Carr in a Six-Way Dance for the inaugural PWE World Championship	
6.	BTW	Rock 'n' Roll Express vs. Powers of Pain; February 27, 2016	Spartanburg, South Carolina	Spartanburg Memorial Auditorium	1,900+	The Rock 'n' Roll Express (Ricky Morton and Robert Gibson) vs. The Powers of Pain (The Barbarian and The Warlord) in a Steel Cage match	
7.	IWR	When Worlds Collide; January 16, 2016	Shawnee, Oklahoma	Firelake Arena	1,800	Ultra Phoenix (c) vs. Ky-ote vs. Matt Sydal vs. Montego Seeka in a Four-Way Dance for the IWR Revolutionary Championship	
8.	NEW	Wrestlefest XX; March 4, 2016	Newburgh, New York	Newburgh Free Academy	1,742	Rey Mysterio and Matt Hardy vs. Caleb Konley and Dalton Castle	
9.	BTW / OMEGA	Matt Hardy vs. Ethan Carter III; February 26, 2016	Raleigh, North Carolina	Dorton Arena	1,750	Matt Hardy (c) vs. Ethan Carter III for the OMEGA Heavyweight Championship	
10.	EVOLVE / WWN	Mercury Rising; April 2, 2016	Dallas, Texas	Eddie Deen's Ranch	1,500 (Note: EVOLVE 59 was also held during Mercury Rising, headlined by Ricochet vs. Will Ospreay, and reportedly drew 1,200.)	Kota Ibushi, Johnny Gargano and TJP vs. Marty Scurll, Will Ospreay and Tommy End	
10.	—	WrestleCon Supershow; April 2, 2016	Dallas, Texas	Landmark Ballroom	1,500	Abyss vs. Andrew Everett vs. AR Fox vs. Jeff Hardy vs. Trevor Lee vs. Pentagón Jr. in a 6-way Monster's Ball match	

Top 10 most-attended shows in 2017
No.	Promotion	Event	Location	Venue	Attendance	Main Event(s)	Ref.
1.	NEW	Wrestlefest; March 3, 2017	Waterbury, Connecticut	Crosby High School	3,300	Kurt Angle vs. Cody Rhodes in a Steel Cage match	
2.	APW	Cow Palace Royal; May 6, 2017	Daly City, California	Cow Palace	3,000	Cody Rhodes vs. Joey Ryan in a Steel Cage match	
2.	—	Lucha Libre Total; September 17, 2017	Cicero, Illinois	Cicero Stadium	3,000	Discovery, El Hijo del Santo and Rey Mysterio Jr. vs. Dr. Cerebro, Super Crazy and Yakuza	
3.	—	Heroes of Lucha Libre; October 1, 2017	Ontario, California	Citizens Business Bank Arena	2,500	Blue Demon Jr., LA Park and Tinieblas Jr. vs. Sam Adonis, The Russian Hacker and Trumposo	
4.	NEW	Wrestling Under The Stars Tour: Bristol; July 28, 2017	Bristol, Connecticut	Muzzy Field	2,368	Rey Mysterio Jr. vs. Caleb Konley	
5.	NEW	Wrestling Under The Stars VI; August 27, 2017	Wappingers Falls, New York	Dutchess Stadium	2,344	Cody Rhodes (c) vs. Rey Mysterio Jr. for the NEW Heavyweight Championship with special referee Ricky Steamboat	
6.	APW	Clash at the Cow Palace; November 10, 2017	Daly City, California	Cow Palace	2,000	Juventud Guerrera and Rey Mysterio Jr. vs. The Lucha Brothers (Penta el 0M and Rey Fénix)	
7.	NEW	Wrestling Under The Stars Tour: Troy; July 15, 2017	Troy, New York	Joseph L. Bruno Stadium	1,893	Cody Rhodes (c) vs. Jack Swagger for the NEW Heavyweight Championship	
8.	—	WrestleCon Supershow; March 31, 2017	Orlando, Florida	Wyndham Resort Hotel	1,750	The Hardys (Matt Hardy and Jeff Hardy) vs. The Lucha Brothers (Penta el 0M and Rey Fénix)	
9.	3 Bat	Hallowmania 9 October 21, 2017	Brownsville, Texas	Jacob Brown Auditorium	1,593	The Lucha Brothers (Penta el 0M and Rey Fénix) vs. The Mecha Wolf and Último Ninja	
10.	PROGRESS	PROGRESS New York City; August 12, 2017	New York City, New York	Elmcor Center	1,500	WALTER (c) vs. Matt Riddle for the PROGRESS Atlas Championship	

Top 10 most-attended shows in 2018
No.	Promotion	Event	Location	Venue	Attendance	Main Event(s)	Ref.
—	BELIEVE	BELIEVE 156; April 21, 2018	Orlando, Florida	Central Florida Fairgrounds	15,000	Aaron Epic (c) vs. Andrew Merlin for the SCW Florida Heavyweight Championship	
1.	—	All In; September 1, 2018	Hoffman Estates, Illinois	Sears Centre Arena	11,263	The Golden Elite (Kota Ibushi, Matt Jackson and Nick Jackson) vs. Bandido, Rey Fénix and Rey Mysterio in a six-man tag team match	
2.	LOW	Legends of Wrestling; April 21, 2018	Detroit, Michigan	Fraser Hockeyland	3,000	The Nasty Boys (Brian Knobbs and Jerry Sags) vs. Knux and Wes Brisco in a Hardcore match	
2.	LOW	Heroes of Lucha Libre; June 2, 2018	Los Angeles, California	Galen Center	3,000	Rey Mysterio Jr. vs. Richard Trumposo	
3.	NEW	Redemption; November 9, 2018	Poughkeepsie, New York	Mid-Hudson Civic Center	2,700	Kenny Omega vs. Rey Fénix	
4.	NEW	Wrestle & Ride; June 16, 2018	Jackson, New Jersey	Six Flags Great Adventure	2,500	Cam Zagami and Robbie E (c) vs. Jerry Lawler and Ryback for the NEW Tag Team Championship	
5.	POWW	Freedom Days; July 1, 2018	Sandwich, Illinois	Sandwich Fairgrounds	2,000	Battle Royal for the King of POWW Championship	
5.	NEW	Wrestling Under The Stars Tour: Niles; July 21, 2018	Niles, Ohio	Eastwood Field	2,000	Wrecking Ball Legursky (c) vs. Jack Swagger for the NEW Heavyweight Championship	
5.	BTW	Billy Gunn vs. Jack Swagger; August 10, 2018	Pawtucket, Rhode Island	McCoy Stadium	2,000	Billy Gunn vs. Jack Swagger	
5.	DCW	Dragon Con; August 30, 2018	Atlanta, Georgia	Hyatt Centennial Ballroom	2,000	Billy Buck (c) vs. Mikael Judas vs. Azrael vs. Logan Creed in a Three-Way Dance for the DCW Dragon Cup Championship	
6.	—	WrestleCon: Mark Hitchcock Memorial SuperShow; April 5, 2018	New Orleans, Louisiana	Sugar Mill	1,600 (Note: There are different reports on the attendance of Joey Janela's Spring Break 2 with numbers ranging from 1,500 to 1,600.)	Golden*Lovers (Kenny Omega and Kota Ibushi) vs. Chuck Taylor and Flip Gordon	
6.	GCW	Joey Janela's Spring Break 2 April 6, 2018	Kenner, Louisiana	Pontchartrain Convention & Civic Center	1,600	Joey Janela vs. The Great Sasuke	
7.	PROGRESS	PROGRESS Mardi Graps; April 6, 2018	Kenner, Louisiana	Pontchartrain Convention & Civic Center	1,500 (Note: The exact attendance figure for MLW Fightland is unknown, however, the event is described as the highest attended show in the company's history having "shattered" the previous record held by MLW Hybrid Hell (June 20, 2003) which drew 1,536 fans. The seating capacity for the Cicero Stadium was 6,000 at the time of the show.)	Travis Banks (c) vs. Shane Strickland for the PROGRESS Atlas Championship	
7.	MLW	MLW Fightland; November 8, 2018	Cicero, Illinois	Cicero Stadium	1,500	The Lucha Brothers (Pentagon Jr. and Rey Fénix) (c) vs. El Hijo de LA Park and LA Park for the MLW World Tag Team Championship	
8.	IW / LU	Impact Wrestling vs. Lucha Underground; April 6, 2018	New Orleans, Louisiana	Sugar Mill	1,400	Austin Aries vs. Pentagón Dark vs. Rey Fénix in a Three-Way Dance	
8.	JCW	Super Gala Saint-Ambroise; April 28, 2018	Saint-Ambroise, Quebec	Arena Marcel-Claveau	1,400	PCO (c) vs. D-Generate for the JCW Heavyweight Championship	
9.	PWR	PWR 10th Anniversary Show; February 24, 2018	San Jose, California	Mt. Pleasant High School	1,200 (Note: There are different reports on the attendance of Mercury Rising with numbers ranging from 1,000 to 1,200.)	Dragon Lee vs. Titán	
9.	WWN	Mercury Rising; April 6, 2018	Kenner, Louisiana	Pontchartrain Convention & Civic Center	1,200	Matt Riddle (c) vs. Will Ospreay for the EVOLVE World Championship	
10.	PWR	Internal Affair; March 10, 2018	San Francisco, California	John O'Connell High School	1,150 (Note: There are different reports on the attendance of Mercury Rising with numbers ranging from 1,100 to 1,150.)	Jushin Thunder Liger and Misterioso vs. Puma and Rocky Romero	

Top 10 most-attended shows in 2019
No.	Promotion	Event	Location	Venue	Attendance	Main Event(s)	Ref.
1.	NEW	Six Flags Slam Fest; June 15, 2019	Jackson, New Jersey	Six Flags Great Adventure	3,800	Jon Moxley vs. Caz XL	
2.	WCE	WrestleCade; November 30, 2019	Winston-Salem, North Carolina	Benton Convention Center	3,000	Tessa Blanchard vs. Taya Valkyrie vs. Rosemary vs. Jordynne Grace in a Four-Way Dance	
3.	MLW	Intimidation Games; March 2, 2019	Cicero, Illinois	Cicero Stadium	2,100	Tom Lawlor (c) vs. Low Ki in a steel cage match for the MLW World Heavyweight Championship	
4.	HOH	Chinlock For Charity; June 15, 2019	Kingston, Ontario	Leon's Centre	2,000	Tommy Dreamer and Billy Gunn vs. The Pillars (TARIK and Tyson Dux)	
4.	DCW	Dragon Con; August 29, 2019	Atlanta, Georgia	Hyatt Centennial Ballroom	2,000	Mikael Judas (c) vs. Azrael vs. David Young in a Three-Way Dance for the DCW Dragon Cup Championship	
5.	NEW	Prison Break; August 16, 2019	Poughkeepsie, New York	Mid-Hudson Civic Center	1,914	Darby Allin vs. Hale Collins in a No Disqualification match for the NEW Heavyweight Championship	
6.	EXPO	Lucha Expo: Mexico vs. The World (Day 3); August 19, 2019	San Diego, California	Harry West Gymnasium	1,500	Mr. Aguila and The Lucha Brothers (Penta el 0M and Rey Fénix) vs. Brian Cage, T. J. Perkins and Jack Evans	
7.	NWA / ROH	Crockett Cup; April 27, 2019	Concord, North Carolina	Cabarrus Arena	1,300	Jim Crockett Sr. Memorial Cup Tag Team Tournament	
7.	NEW	Wrestling Under The Stars Tour: Norwich; August 17, 2019	Norwich, Connecticut	Dodd Stadium	1,300	Darby Allin and Jon Moxley vs. Christian Casanova and JT Dunn	
8.	EXPO	Lucha Expo: Lucha Society X Reunion (Day 1); August 18, 2019	San Diego, California	Harry West Gymnasium	1,200	The Lucha Brothers (Penta el 0M and Rey Fénix) vs. Teddy Hart and Jack Evans	
8.	MLW	War Chamber; September 7, 2019	North Richland Hills, Texas	NYTEX Sports Centre	1,200	Team Von Erichs (Marshall Von Erich, Ross Von Erich, Low Ki and Tom Lawlor) (with Kevin Von Erich) vs. Contra Unit (Ikuro Kwon, Jacob Fatu, Josef Samael and Simon Gotch) in a War Chamber match	
9.	NWA / TNT	New Years Clash; January 5, 2019	Clarksville, Tennessee	Wilma Rudolph Event Center	1,149	Nick Aldis (c) vs. James Storm for the NWA Worlds Heavyweight Championship	
10.	SHW	SHW 8 May 3, 2019	Canton, Georgia	ACTION Building	1,026	Alan Angels (c) vs. AC Mack and Shannon Moore in a Three-Way Dance for the SHW Championship	

=== 2020s ===
Top 10 most-attended shows in 2020
No.	Promotion	Event	Location	Venue	Attendance	Main Event(s)	Ref.
1.	MLW	MLW Fightland; February 1, 2020	Philadelphia, Pennsylvania	2300 Arena	1,000	Jacob Fatu (c) vs. CIMA for the MLW World Heavyweight Championship	
2.	WW	Friday Night Lights; August 7, 2022	Chicago Heights, Illinois	Marian Catholic High School	500 (Note: There are different reports on the attendance of Friday Night Lights with numbers ranging from 450 to 500.)	Brian Pillman Jr. (c) vs. Robert Anthony for the Warrior Wrestling Championship	
2.	127-PW	127 Pro Wrestling; December 10, 2020	Grimsley, Tennessee	127 Performing Arts Center	500	Nick Aldis (c) vs. Brian Pillman Jr. for the NWA Worlds Heavyweight Championship	
3.	SHW	SHW 16; January 10, 2020	Canton, Georgia	ACTION Building	475	Joe Black vs. William Huckaby in a Dog Collar match	
4.	SHW	SWH 17; February 7, 2020	Canton, Georgia	ACTION Building	450	Not Yet Rated (Kevin Ryan and Jordan Kingsley) (c) vs. The Lynch Mob (Matt Lynch and Joey Lynch) for in a Steel Cage match for the SHW Tag Team Championship	
5.	SHW	SHW 18; March 6, 2020	Canton, Georgia	ACTION Building	417	Ashton Starr and The Lynch Mob (Matt Lynch and Joey Lynch) vs. Corey Hollis, Mikael Judás and Brady Pierce	
6.	NYWC	Outlaw Wrestling#17; February 20, 2020	New York City, New York	Our Lady of Mount Carmel	400	Willow Nightingale vs. Tasha Steelz	
7.	SHW	SHW 20: Still Here 2 October 2, 2020	Canton, Georgia	ACTION Building	382	Corey Hollis (c) vs. Joe Black for the SHW Championship	
8.	SHW	SHW 19: Rumble Jack; August 28, 2020	Canton, Georgia	ACTION Building	363	30-man Battle Royal	
9.	FLQ	Cold Wars; August 2, 2020	Montreal, Quebec	Bain Mathieu	350	Nyla Rose vs LuFisto	
10.	WP	WrestlePro Alaska: The Show Must Go On! September 19, 2020	Palmer, Alaska	Denali Harley-Davidson	322	Anthony Bowens (c) vs. Deonn Rusman for the WrestlePro Gold Championship	

Top 10 most-attended shows in 2021
No.	Promotion	Event	Location	Venue	Attendance	Main Event(s)	Ref.
1.	GLCW	Blizzard Brawl; April 12, 2021	Waukesha, Wisconsin	Waukesha County Expo Center	2,100	Adam Scherr and EC3 vs. Jake Something and Rohit Raju	
2.	MLA	MLA 22: Redemption; July 11, 2021	Norcross, Georgia	Espacio Discotheque	1,800	Andrade El Idolo vs. Laredo Kid	
3.	NSPW	Playball; August 7, 2021	Quebec City, Quebec	Stade Canac	1,500	Marko Estrada (c) vs. DARS for the NSPW Television Championship	
4.	GCW	The Art of War Games; September 4, 2021	Hoffman Estates, Illinois	Grand Sports Arena	1,450	Matt Cardona (c) vs. Jon Moxley for the GCW World Championship	
5.	MLW	Battle Riot III; July 10, 2021	Philadelphia, Pennsylvania	2300 Arena	1,000	41-man Battle Riot match	
5.	GCW	Homecoming (Day 1); July 24, 2021	Atlantic City, New Jersey	Carousel Room	1,000	Nick Gage (c) vs. Matt Cardona in a Death match for the GCW World Championship	
5.	FMW-E / H2O	Destiny: Onita vs. Tremont; October 31, 2021	Trenton, New Jersey	Trenton Thunder Ballpark	1,000	Atsushi Onita vs. Matt Tremont in an Exploding Barbed Wire match	
6.	GCW	No Signal in the Hills; August 7, 2021	Los Angeles, California	Ukrainian Culture Center	975	Nick Gage vs. Dark Sheik in a Death match	
7.	SAW	The Big Bang; October 9, 2021	Lacey Township, New Jersey	Lacey Township High School	850	Powerchild & The Blue World Order (Hollywood Nova & Da Blue Guy) vs. The Coralluzzo Collection Agency (Rhett Titus, Rik Ratchet and Traxx)	
8.	NWA	NWA Powerrr; August 30, 2021	St. Louis, Missouri	Chase Park Plaza Hotel	800	Tyrus (c) vs. BLK Jeez for the NWA Television Championship	
9.	GCW	Tournament of Survival 666; June 5, 2021	Atlantic City, New Jersey	Carousel Room	700+ (Note: There are different reports on the attendance of the Stadium Series with numbers ranging from 700 to 1,000.)	8-man Tournament of Survival	
9.	WW	Stadium Series (Day 2); July 17, 2021	Chicago Heights, Illinois	Marian Catholic High School	700+	Kylie Rae (c) vs. Lady Frost for the Warrior Wrestling Women's Championship	
10.	MLW	War Chamber; November 6, 2021	Philadelphia, Pennsylvania	2300 Arena	675	The Hammerheads (Alexander Hammerstone, EJ Nduka, Richard Holliday, Matanza Duran and Savio Vega) vs. Contra Unit (Ikuro Kwon, Jacob Fatu, Mads Krügger, Soldier #1 and Soldier #2) in a War Chamber match	

Top 10 most-attended shows in 2022
No.	Promotion	Event	Location	Venue	Attendance	Main Event(s)	Ref.
1.	JCP / Starrcast	Ric Flair's Last Match; July 31, 2022	Nashville, Tennessee	Nashville Municipal Auditorium	6,800	Ric Flair and Andrade El Idolo vs. Jeff Jarrett and Jay Lethal	
2.	WCPBTW	WCPBTW The Reunion: A Homecoming; March 12, 2022	Chillicothe, Ohio	Unioto High School	3,000	nZo and Tommy Rich vs. Chris Cannon and Mr. Hughes	
3.	GCW	The Wrld on GCW; January 23, 2022	New York City, New York	Hammerstein Ballroom	2,025	Jon Moxley (c) vs. Homicide for the GCW World Championship	
4.	NEW	WrestleFest 26; January 22, 2022	Poughkeepsie, New York	Majed J. Nesheiwat Convention Center	2,000	Christopher Daniels vs. Malakai Black	
4.	WW	Warrior Wrestling 19; February 12, 2022	Cicero, Illinois	Cicero Stadium	2,000	Thunder Rosa (c) vs. Athena for the Warrior Wrestling Women's Championship	
5.	MLA	MLA 24: Aureus; March 6, 2022	Norcross, Georgia	Espacio Discotheque	1,300	Máscara Dorada and Negro Casas vs. Marty Scurll and Místico	
6.	MLA	MLA 25; June 26, 2022	Norcross, Georgia	Espacio Discotheque	1,200	Cinta de Oro and Samuray del Sol vs. La Anexi n (Angel Fashion and Mike Mendoza)	
7.	BTW	FTR VS. R'N'R; January 22, 2022	Spartanburg, South Carolina	Spartanburg Memorial Auditorium	1,000	Rock 'n' Roll Express (Ricky Morton and Robert Gibson) vs. FTR (Cash Wheeler and Dax Harwood)	
7.	PW	Prestige Roseland 2 February 20, 2022	Portland, Oregon	Roseland Theater	1,000	Malakai Black vs. Davey Richards	
7.	XPW	Killafornia; April 9, 2022	Pomona, California	Derby Room	1,000	16-man XPW King of the Deathmatch Championship tournament	
7.	WW	Warrior Wrestling 23; June 18, 2022	Grand Rapids, Michigan	DeltaPlex Arena & Conference Center	1,000	Will Ospreay (c) vs. KC Navarro vs. Brian Cage vs. Brian Pillman Jr. vs. Jake Something vs. Jeff Cobb vs. Lance Archer vs. Sam Adonis vs. Swerve Strickland in a War of Attrition match for the Warrior Wrestling Championship	
7.	MFPW	Step in the Arena; June 30, 2022	Philadelphia, Pennsylvania	2300 Arena	1,000	Bobby Buffet (c) vs. Goldy vs. LSG vs. Travis Jacobs in a four-way match for the MFPW Heavyweight Championship	
7.	WRW	Sheridan Fourth of July Festival; July 4, 2022	Sheridan, Indiana	Biddle Memorial Park	1,000	The Highlight Reel (Damien Reel and Damon Reel) vs. Dalton Love and Luke Savage	
7.	PWR	Cage of Horrors; July 9, 2022	Clive, Iowa	Horizon Events Center	1,000	The Unit (JT Dunn, Logan James and Tyler Matrix) vs. The Crew (Matthew Palmer, Rich Swann and Swerve Strickland) in a Cage of Horrors match	
7.	BCW	Tribute To The Extreme; December 17, 2022	Philadelphia, Pennsylvania	2300 Arena	1,000	Rob Van Dam vs. Rhino	
8.	MLW	Super Series; September 18, 2022	Norcross, Georgia	Space Event Center	968	Laredo Kid, Komander, and Microman vs. Mini Abismo Negro, Gino Medina, and Taurus (with Dr. Dax) in a Loser Leaves Town Trios match	
9.	GCW	Most Notorious; January 14, 2022	Detroit, Michigan	Harpo's Theatre	800	Alex Colon (c) vs. Hoodfoot for the GCW Ultraviolent Championship	
9.	MCW	Winter Blast (Day 1); February 5, 2022	Hollywood, Maryland	Hollywood VFD	800	Ken Dixon (c) vs. Dak Draper for the MCW Heavyweight Championship	
9.	MLW	SuperFight; February 26, 2022	Charlotte, North Carolina	Grady Cole Center	800	The Von Erichs (Marshall Von Erich and Ross Von Erich) vs. The Mortons (Ricky Morton and Kerry Morton)	
10.	LVAC	SteelStacks Smackdown; August 27, 2022	Bethlehem, Pennsylvania	Musikfest Cafe	750	Abby Jane, Cheeseburger, Delirious and Orange Cassidy vs. Dan Champion, Logan Easton LaRoux, Lucky tHURTeen and Vita VonStarr	
10.	PWR	Season Finale; December 3, 2022	Clive, Iowa	Horizon Events Center	750	Rich Swann vs. Swerve Strickland in a Hell of War match	

Top 10 most-attended shows in 2023
No.	Promotion	Event	Location	Venue	Attendance	Main Event(s)	Ref.
1.	Sukeban	Sukeban Miami; December 6, 2023	Miami, Florida	Lot 11 Skatepark	1,500+	Commander Nakajima vs. Ichigo Sayaka for the inaugural Sukeban World Championship	
2.	WLW	Showdown #212; February 25, 2023 (Note: Aired on tape delay on May 6, 2023.)	Fort Leonard Wood, Missouri	Davidson Fitness Center	1,200	Rahim De La Suede (c) vs. Matt Sydal for the WLW Junior Heavyweight Championship	
3.	UWN	Championship Wrestling #600; January 15, 2023 (Note: Aired on tape delay on February 12, 2023.)	Mesa, Arizona	Bell Bank Park	1,000	30-man Red Carpet Rumble match	
3.	UWN	Championship Wrestling #599; January 15, 2023 (Note: Aired on tape delay on February 5, 2023.)	Mesa, Arizona	Bell Bank Park	1,000	Danny Limelight (c) vs. Eddie Kingston for the UWN World Championship	
3.	UWN	Championship Wrestling #598; January 15, 2023 (Note: Aired on tape delay on January 29, 2023.)	Mesa, Arizona	Bell Bank Park	1,000	Kevin Martenson (c) vs. Davey Richards for the UWN Heritage Heavyweight Championship	
4.	DW	Doomsday; February 17, 2023	Calgary, Alberta	Victoria Pavilion	900	Nick Aldis (c) vs. Chris Masters for the Stu Hart Heritage Championship	
4.	GCW	GCW EFFY's Big Gay Brunch 6 April 1, 2023	Los Angeles, California	Ukrainian Culture Center	900	THRUSSY (Allie Katch, Dark Sheik and EFFY) vs. Billy Dixon, Charles Mason and Parrow	
5.	—	Cinco De Mayo: Luchador Wrestling; May 5, 2023	Monroe, Georgia	Southern Brewing Company	800	Luke Sampson vs. Vary Morales	
6.	Sukeban	Sukeban World Premiere; September 21, 2023 (Note: Aired live on TikTok.)	New York City, New York	Capitale	750	Ichigo Sayaka vs. Countess Saori in an eliminator match for the Sukeban World Championship	
7.	AXW	For The People; January 7, 2023	Hamburg, Pennsylvania	Hamburg Field House	700	EN Bush (c) vs. Matt Quay in a Best 2-out-of-3 Falls match for the AXW Heavyweight Championship	
7.	PW	Prestige Roseland 5 April 29, 2023	Portland, Oregon	Roseland Theater	700	Kevin Blackwood vs. Penta El Zero Miedo	
7.	VCW	Logan Easton LaRoux Farewell Match; November 11, 2023 (Note: Aired live on TitleMatchNetwork.com.)	Alexandria, Virginia	Leonard Chick Armstrong Recreation Center	700	Logan Easton LaRoux vs. Wheeler Yuta in a Farewell match	
8.	MIW	Fight For Freedom IV; January 7, 2023	Chanhassen, Minnesota	American Legion	650	Paul Reed (c) vs. Seto Kobara for the MIW Heavyweight Championship	
8.	GCW	GCW ¿Si or No? November 4, 2023	Atlanta, Georgia	Center Stage Theater	650	Joey Janela vs. Jacob Fatu in a Hardcore match	
9.	PWG	Battle of Los Angeles (Night 1); January 7, 2023	Los Angeles, California	Globe Theatre	600	17-man Battle of Los Angeles tournament	
9.	PWG	Battle of Los Angeles (Night 2); January 8, 2023	Los Angeles, California	Globe Theatre	600	17-man Battle of Los Angeles tournament	
9.	RCW	RCW Wake Up! February 25, 2023	West Portsmouth, Ohio	The Complex	600	Onyx (c) vs. Tank Runyon for the RCW Heavyweight Championship	
9.	C4	C4 Sixteen Candles; November 24, 2023 (Note: Aired on tape delay on November 28, 2023.)	Ottawa, Ontario	Preston Event Centre	600	Kevin Blackwood (c) vs. Junior Benito in a No Disqualification, No Countout match for the C4 Championship	
9.	C4	C4 Hell Or High Water; April 28, 2023 (Note: Aired on tape delay (via IndependentWrestling.tv) on May 2, 2023.)	Ottawa, Ontario	Preston Event Centre	600	Kevin Blackwood (c) vs. Gabriel Fuerza vs. Gringo Loco vs. Junior Benito vs. Stu Grayson vs. Travis Williams for the C4 Championship	
9.	ESW	ESW Brawlfest; May 13, 2023 (Note: Aired on tape delay (via IndependentWrestling.tv) on May 13, 2023.)	Buffalo, New York	Buffalo Riverworks	600	Kevin Bennett (c) vs. Matt Cardona for the ESW Heavyweight Championship	
10.	GCW / DDT	GCW vs. DDT; March 31, 2023	Los Angeles, California	Ukrainian Culture Center	551	YOSHIHIKO (c) vs. Cole Radrick for the DDT Ironman Heavymetalweight Championship	

== See also ==
- List of professional wrestling terms
- List of professional wrestling memorial shows
