= Great Lakes Championship Wrestling =

American independent professional wrestling promotion

- Acronym: GLCW
- Founded: 1997
- Style: Professional wrestling
- Headquarters: Grafton, Wisconsin, United States
- Founder: Dave Herro
- Owner: Dave Herro
- Website: www.glcwwrestling.com

Great Lakes Championship Wrestling (GLCW) is an American independent professional wrestling promotion based in Grafton, Wisconsin. The wrestling promotion was founded by Pro Wrestling Report host Dave Herro in 1997. The promotion's flagship event, "Blizzard Brawl", set a number of attendance records on the independent circuit between 2008 and 2021.

== History ==
In April 1999, GLCW wrestler "The Enforcer" Ike Andrews (Andy Eisenhauer) was featured in the Milwaukee Journal Sentinel. Andrews, a "fan favorite", was co-holder of the GLCW Tag Team Championship with "rulebreaker" Trevor "The Heartbreaker" Adonis.

Herro was one of several pro wrestling promoters who brought attention to the dangers of backyard wrestling after the in-ring death of Tom Nash at a Wisconsin All-Star Wrestling show in August 2000. Herro, who hosted a pro wrestling radio show on Waukesha-based WAUK, claimed there were "as many as 20 amateur groups operating in the bars and backyards of southeastern Wisconsin". According to Herro, legitimate promotions such as GLCW required aspiring wrestlers to pay as much as $3,000 (equivalent to US$5,609 in 2025) for a training course from experienced wrestlers endorsed by World Championship Wrestling and the World Wrestling Federation.

In September 2003, GLCW held a special benefit show for Midwest Athletes Against Childhood Cancer in Richfield, Wisconsin. The event was headlined by Jerry "The King" Lawler and Matt Longtine as well as a special appearance by manager Bobby "The Brain" Heenan.

GLCW was part of Mr. Anderson's world tour following his release from World Wrestling Entertainment in 2009. Roddy Piper appeared in Racine, Wisconsin for "Rowdy Roddy Piper Day" which was officially proclaimed by then mayor John Dickert on April 16, 2010. Co-hosted by GLCW, Piper was presented with an honorary award from the city's public information officer Mark Eickhorst.

On May 15, 2022, GLCW teamed up with Control Your Narrative (CYN) to present the Awakening event which featured Adam Scherr, EC3, Dontae Smiley, and Flip Gordon taking on Backwoods Brown, Drew Hernandez, Ragnar The Ruthless, and TW3 in an eight-man tag team match as the main event.

On December 5, 2024 during the Blizzard Brawl event, Dustin Jackson defended the OVW Media Championship against Jack Vaughn and Tony Gunn.

== Championships ==
Championship	Current Champion(s)	Date won	Days held	Event	Location	Notes
GLCW Heavyweight Championship	Kal Herro	December 6, 2025	280+	Blizzard Brawl	Waukesha, Wisconsin	The heavyweight title of GLCW.
GLCW Tag Team Championship	The Rhodes Brothers (Wayne Rhodes and Wyatt Rhodes)	December 6, 2025	280+	Blizzard Brawl	Waukesha, Wisconsin	The tag team title of GLCW.
GLCW Cruiserweight Championship	Keagan Garland	December 6, 2025	280+	Blizzard Brawl	Waukesha, Wisconsin	The title was established in 1998 and defended throughout the year.
GLCW Women's Championship	Leila Grey	December 3, 2022	1,379+	Blizzard Brawl: ATTITUDE	Waukesha, Wisconsin	
