= Harper Stadium =

Indoor arena in Fort Smith, Arkansas

Coordinates: 35°25′09″N 94°22′37″W

- Interactive map of Harper Stadium
- Address: 4400 Midland Boulevard; Fort Smith, Arkansas; United States
- Capacity: 9,000
- Surface: Dirt

Harper Stadium is a 9,000-seat indoor arena located in Fort Smith, Arkansas. It is essentially a covered, open-air arena used for rodeos, auto racing, concerts (between 7,000 and 10,000), and other events.

The arena measures 120 feet (37 m) wide and 308 feet (94 m) long (36,960 square feet of space), and is the only sporting venue in the Fort Smith area to be used for ice shows and circuses.

Harper Stadium is part of Kay Rodgers Park, site of the annual Arkansas Oklahoma State Fair.
