= Marshfield Fair =

Country fair in Massachusetts, United States

Coordinates: 42.098°N 70.717°W

The Marshfield Fair is a traditional, American country fair that has taken place at the end of August every year since 1867. The fair is located on the 62-acre (250,000 m^{2}) Marshfield Fairgrounds in Marshfield, Massachusetts, approximately 30 miles (48 km) south of Boston in Massachusetts' South Shore region.

The fair features amusement rides, a midway, typical fair food and extensive farm and agriculture exhibits. It is one of the few remaining fairs that still support 4-H shows and competitions. On three days, there are blues music festivals with local and national talent.

Regular special events each year include the demolition derby and tractor pulls.

The 139th Marshfield Fair took place from August 18 to August 27, 2006. Attendance was estimated at 180,000 visitors.

The 144th Marshfield Fair was supposed to take place from August 19 to August 28, 2011, but was forced to close early because of the threat of Hurricane Irene. Weather has played an important factor in the amount of business the fair gets throughout the years.

The 153rd was deferred to August 2021 as the COVID-19 pandemic was to blame for 2020's cancellation. There was also no fair in 1917–18 & 1942–45.
