= Starrcast =

Series of professional wrestling fan conventions promoted by Conrad Thompson

- Status: Active
- Genre: Professional wrestling
- Country: United States
- Inaugurated: 2018
- Organizer: Conrad Thompson
- Filing status: Corporate
- Sponsor: Bluechew; Box of Gimmicks; Buffalo Wild Wings; Brand New House; C2E2; Cultural Counsel; Edward Jones; Iconic Ivey; Pro Wrestling Tees
- Website: starrcast.com

Starrcast is a professional wrestling fan convention promoted by Conrad Thompson. The event is usually paired alongside a major professional wrestling show and typically runs for four days — from Thursday to Sunday – featuring wrestlers, wrestling personalities and podcast hosts, interviews, fan activities, and meet-and-greets.

== History ==
Thompson originally had the idea of a fan convention during the NWA Legends Fanfest in 2017, but it was cancelled. Later in December, Thompson pitched the idea to Cody Rhodes (one of the founders of AEW) and was intrigued by the idea of a wrestling podcast convention. After some talks, Thompson emailed him the itinerary and Cody told Matt Jackson and Nick Jackson (two-thirds of the founders of All In) and he told Thompson they liked it. The event would be compared to WrestleCon that is held during WrestleMania weekend.

In March 2018, following the announcement of All In, to coincide with the event, Thompson announced he would hold the Starrcast, a fan convention which would feature numerous wrestlers, wrestling personalities and podcast personalities.

On August 29, the full schedule for Starrcast was released. The event, held August 30 to September 2, was produced by Global Force Entertainment with all of the event streamed live on FITE TV.

In January 2019 it was announced that Starrcast would return in conjunction with All Elite Wrestling's Double or Nothing event in Las Vegas, Nevada.

The 2022 Starrcast was held in conjunction with WWE's SummerSlam in Nashville, Tennessee, with the event built around Ric Flair's Last Match.

== Dates and venues ==
No	Date	Location	Venue	Accompanying professional wrestling show	Ref
I	August 30, 2018 - September 2, 2018	Schaumburg, Illinois	Hyatt Regency Chicago	All In (Independent/Ring of Honor)	
II	May 23, 2019 - May 26, 2019	Paradise, Nevada	Caesars Palace	Double or Nothing (All Elite Wrestling)	
III	August 29, 2019 - September 1, 2019	Schaumburg, Illinois	Hyatt Regency Chicago	All Out (All Elite Wrestling)	
IV	November 7, 2019 - November 10, 2019	Baltimore, Maryland	Crowne Plaza Baltmore	Full Gear (All Elite Wrestling)	
V	July 29, 2022 - July 31, 2022	Nashville, Tennessee	Nashville Fairgrounds	SummerSlam (WWE) and Ric Flair's Last Match (Independent/Jim Crockett Promotions)	
VI	September 1, 2023 - September 3, 2023	Schaumburg, Illinois	Hyatt Regency Chicago	All Out (All Elite Wrestling)	
Downunder (VII)	April 11, 2024 - April 14, 2024	Ballarat, Victoria, Australia	Various Venues	Mickie James Presents HER & Bret Hart Presents Australian Stampede (Oceania Pro Wrestling)	
Texas (VIII)	July 11, 2025 - July 12, 2025	Arlington, Texas	Sheraton Arlington Hotel	All In (All Elite Wrestling) and Supercard of Honor (Ring of Honor)	

== Notable guests ==
- A. C. H.
- Adam Page
- Allie
- Allysin Kay
- Amber O'Neal
- Angelina Love
- Arn Anderson
- Austin Aries
- Baby Doll
- The Barbarian
- Bea Priestley
- Bill Apter
- Black Taurus
- The Blue Meanie
- Brandi Rhodes
- Bruce Prichard
- Brutus Beefcake
- Bryan Alvarez
- Bull James
- Bully Ray
- Bret Hart
- Carl Ouellet
- Cheeseburger
- Chelsea Green
- Christian
- Christopher Daniels
- Chuckie T.
- CM Punk
- Cody Rhodes
- Colt Cabana
- Dalton Castle
- Dave Meltzer
- David Arquette
- David McLane
- David Schultz
- Deonna Purrazzo
- Diamond Dallas Page
- Disco Inferno
- DJZ
- Don West
- Dustin Rhodes
- Dutch Mantell
- Earl Hebner
- Eddie Kingston
- Eric Bischoff
- Ethan Page
- Fénix
- Frankie Kazarian
- Gail Kim
- Glacier
- Haku
- Hurricane Helms
- Ian Riccaboni
- Insane Clown Posse
- Ivelisse Velez
- J. J. Dillon
- James Ellsworth
- James Storm
- Jay Briscoe
- Jeff Cobb
- Jeff Jarrett
- Jerry Lawler
- Jimmy Hart
- Jim Ross
- Jerry Lynn
- Jessicka Havok
- Jim Johnston
- Jimmy Havoc
- Joel Gertner
- Joey Janela
- Joey Ryan
- Jon Moxley
- Jonathan Coachman
- Kenny Omega
- Kenta Kobashi
- Kevin Kelly
- Kevin Nash
- Kevin Sullivan
- Kia Stevens
- Kip Sabian
- Konnan
- Kota Ibushi
- Leva Bates
- Lex Luger
- Lisa Marie Varon
- Lita
- Macaulay Culkin
- Madusa
- Magnum T. A.
- Marc Mero
- Maxwell Jacob Friedman
- Marcus Bagwell
- Mark Briscoe
- Marty Scurll
- Matt Cross
- Matt Striker
- Mia Yim
- Mikey Whipwreck
- Missy Hyatt
- Nick Aldis
- Pentagón Jr.
- Peter Avalon
- Punishment Martinez
- Rebel
- Rey Mysterio
- Ricky Steamboat
- Road Warrior Animal
- Robbie E
- Ron Funches
- Ron Simmons
- Rosa Mendes
- Rosemary
- Sami Callihan
- Sammy Guevara
- Samuel Shaw
- Sandman
- Scarlett Bordeaux
- Scorpio Sky
- Scott Hall
- Raven
- Scott Steiner
- Sean Mooney
- Sgt. Slaughter
- Shane Douglas
- Shannon Moore
- Shawn Daivari
- Shawn Spears
- SoCal Val
- Stephen Amell
- Summer Rae
- Sting
- Shane Helms
- Tama Tonga
- Tanga Loa
- Tazz
- Taylor Williamson
- Teddy Long
- Tenille Dashwood
- Tessa Blanchard
- Tommy Dreamer
- Tommy Young
- Tony Schiavone
- Trent Barreta
- Tully Blanchard
- Veda Scott
- Velvet Sky
- Wade Keller
- X-Pac
- The Young Bucks

== See also ==
- List of professional wrestling conventions
