= Something to Wrestle with Bruce Prichard =

Wrestling podcast

- Something to Wrestle with Bruce Prichard logo
- Genre: Sports; Pro Wrestling; Humor
- Language: English

Cast and voices
- Hosted by: Conrad Thompson
- Starring: Bruce Prichard; JBL (2024–2025)

Production
- Length: 75–240 minutes

Technical specifications
- Audio format: MP3

Publication
- No. of episodes: 471 (as of May 15, 2025)
- Original release: August 5, 2016 – present
- Provider: Westwood One
- Updates: Weekly

Related
- Website: westwoodonepodcasts

Something to Wrestle with Bruce Prichard is an audio podcast that discusses topics, events, wrestlers and memorable moments through the lens of WWE executive Bruce Prichard. The show was launched in August 2016 on MLW Radio. The episodes' length typically ranges from 2 to 4 hours, with the focus of the podcast being centered around Prichards tenure with WWE and TNA. The video version of the podcast called "Something Else to Wrestle with Bruce Prichard" debuted on the WWE Network on April 18, 2018.

== Format ==
The podcast is co-hosted by Conrad Thompson. Thompson sits down with Bruce Prichard, a former WWE executive who performed on camera and was behind the scenes with the company for over twenty years. Each week, Thompson and Prichard discuss a new topic which is typically a particular WWE event, WWE happening or WWE character. Prichard discusses his experiences and recalls the topic of the episode from his perspective. Initially, the topic of each episode was voted on by the fans through Facebook or Twitter, however following Prichard's return to WWE in 2019 causing a more limited recording schedule, Thompson and Prichard now determine the topics in advance. A version of the podcast is available without commercials for a fee. The free version of the podcast contains approximately 20–25 minutes of audio commercials per hour.

== Reception ==
In 2017, Something to Wrestle with Bruce Prichard won two awards. The Academy of Podcasters named the podcast its Sports & Recreation podcast of the year. In addition, Sports Illustrated named the podcast its Sports Podcast of the Year in its annual Sports Media Awards.

== Spin-offs ==
On January 30, 2017, Thompson launched a second show with former WCW announcer Tony Schiavone titled What Happened When available on MLW Radio discussing stories from Jim Crockett Promotions and World Championship Wrestling.

In April 2018, another spin-off launched with Thompson and former WCW president Eric Bischoff known as 83 Weeks, covering the same topics as What Happened When, but from the perspective of Bischoff, who ran WCW from 1994 through 1999.

In April 2018, Prichard and Thompson began doing a show for the WWE Network titled Something Else to Wrestle with Bruce Prichard. The show has the same format as the original podcast, the only difference between the two being that Something Else to Wrestle is a video version of the show. The first episode was on April 18, 2018.

In May 2019, Thompson began another spin-off with former WCW and WWE talent, and current All Elite Wrestling commentator Jim Ross, known as Grilling JR.

In January 2021, another spin-off was launched this time featuring WWE Hall of Famer Kurt Angle, known as The Kurt Angle Show.

== Live shows ==
Unlike the audio podcast, the show will sometimes feature guests such as Pat Patterson and Jeff Jarrett. Something to Wrestle no longer does live shows as of Bruce Prichard's return to WWE in early 2019.

== Episodes ==
#	Episode	Air Date	Runtime
1	Dusty Rhodes in the WWF	August 5, 2016	1h 7m
2	The Mega Powers	August 12, 2016	1h 24m
3	The Lex Express	August 19, 2016	1h 12m
4	The Ultimate Warrior	August 26, 2016	1h 7m
5	The Montreal Screwjob	September 2, 2016	1h 28m
6	Brawl for All	September 9, 2016	1h 23m
7	The WWF Steroid Trial	September 16, 2016	1h 42m
8	The Radicalz jump from WCW to WWE	September 23, 2016	2h 20m
9	WrestleMania VII	September 30, 2016	2h 13m
10	WWF & ECW's 1996–1997 Relationship	October 7, 2016	1h 58m
11	WWF Prime Time Wrestling	October 14, 2016	2h 9m
12	TNA Wrestling	October 21, 2016	2h 55m
13	Lita x Edge x Matt Hardy Love Triangle	October 28, 2016	1h 56m
14	1990 Survivor Series	November 4, 2016	2h 17m
15	Brian Pillman in the WWF	November 11, 2016	2h 58m
16	Vader in the WWF	November 18, 2016	3h 3m
17	TNA Wrestling - Chapter 2	November 24, 2016	2h 59m
18	Sunny in the WWF	December 2, 2016	2h 43m
19	The Last WCW Monday Nitro	December 9, 2016	2h 21m
20	The 1997 Royal Rumble	December 16, 2016	3h 5m
21	Mr. Perfect	December 23, 2016	3h 17m
22	#LoveToKnow (Q&A from fans)	December 30, 2016	2h 23m
23	The Million Dollar Man	January 6, 2017	3h 8m
24	"Ravishing" Rick Rude	January 13, 2017	2h 21m
25	1994 Royal Rumble	January 20, 2017	1h 57m
26	Kurt Angle	January 27, 2017	3h 0m
27	The nWo in the WWE	February 3, 2017	2h 40m
28	The XFL	February 10, 2017	2h 37m
29	No Holds Barred	February 15, 2017	1h 59m
30	WrestleMania VI	February 17, 2017	2h 28m
31	Houston Wrestling	February 22, 2017	2h 23m
32	WrestleMania IX	February 24, 2017	3h 2m
33	Why Was Bruce Fired?	March 1, 2017	1h 29m
34	Beyond The Mat	March 3, 2017	2h 13m
35	WrestleMania XV	March 10, 2017	2h 24m
36	"Rowdy" Roddy Piper	March 17, 2017	3h 9m
37	WrestleMania 13	March 24, 2017	2h 44m
38	Hulk Hogan's 1987	March 31, 2017	1h 17m
39	Undertaker (1993-1994)	April 7, 2017	3h 14m
40	Owen Hart	April 14, 2017	2h 51m
41	#LoveToKnow (Q&A Bonus Show!)	April 19, 2017	2h 54m
42	Jim Cornette in the WWF	April 21, 2017	3h 9m
43	In Your House 8: Beware of Dog	April 28, 2017	2h 32m
44	Global Wrestling Federation	May 3, 2017	2h 16m
45	Judgment Day 2002	May 5, 2017	2h 45m
46	WWECW	May 12, 2017	3h 12m
47	King of the Ring 1996	May 19, 2017	2h 32m
48	Eric Bischoff in the WWE	May 26, 2017	2h 56m
49	Hulk Hogan's 1988	June 2, 2017	3h 0m
50	Austin Walks Out	June 9, 2017	3h 0m
51	Vince Russo in the WWE	June 16, 2017	3h 32m
52	The Rise of John Cena	June 23, 2017	3h 7m
53	The Rise of CM Punk	June 30, 2017	3h 24m
54	In Your House 16: Canadian Stampede	July 7, 2017	2h 40m
55	Demolition	July 14, 2017	2h 41m
56	Fully Loaded 1998	July 21, 2017	3h 0m
57	SummerSlam 2000	July 28, 2017	3h 3m
58	Paul Heyman in the WWE	August 4, 2017	3h 3m
59	SummerSlam 1996	August 11, 2017	2h 50m
60	Razor Ramon	August 18, 2017	2h 54m
61	SummerSlam 2002	August 25, 2017	2h 37m
62	Something to Wrestle For Houston (Benefit show following Hurricane Harvey)	September 1, 2017	2h 49m
63	The Best of Something to Wrestle, Part II	September 6, 2017	2h 22m
64	"Macho Man" Randy Savage	September 8, 2017	4h 10m
65	Jeff Jarrett in the WWF	September 15, 2017	4h 3m
66	Unforgiven 1999	September 22, 2017	3h 6m
67	Bobby "The Brain" Heenan	September 29, 2017	3h 32m
68	In Your House 18: Badd Blood 1997	October 6, 2017	3h 11m
69	No Mercy 1999	October 13, 2017	3h 15m
70	Doink the Clown	October 20, 2017	2h 28m
71	The Rock 97/98	October 27, 2017	3h 19m
72	The New Age Outlaws	November 3, 2017	3h 50m
73	Bret Hart 96/97	November 10, 2017	4h 45m
74	Survivor Series 2002	November 17, 2017	3h 14m
75	Survivor Series 1987	November 24, 2017	3h 8m
76	Jake "The Snake" Roberts	December 1, 2017	3h 56m
77	The Steiners and Big Poppa Pump in the WWF	December 8, 2017	3h 22m
78	Edge in the WWE	December 15, 2017	5h 4m
79	Goldust	December 22, 2017	5h 5m
80	Vengeance 2001	December 29, 2017	2h 40m
81	The Creation of Monday Night Raw	January 5, 2018	2h 30m
82	The Rockers & Marty Jannetty	January 12, 2018	4h 17m
83	Royal Rumble 1998	January 19, 2018	2h 42m
84	Royal Rumble 1988	January 26, 2018	2h 42m
85	The Main Event on NBC: Hogan vs Andrè 88	February 2, 2018	1h 49m
86	Undertaker 1995-1997	February 9, 2018	4h 42m
87	No Way Out 1998	February 16, 2018	2h 11m
88	No Way Out 2003	February 23, 2018	2h 48m
89	Shawn Michaels 1993	March 2, 2018	2h 21m
90	Shawn Michaels 94/95	March 9, 2018	3h 36m
91	Saturday Night's Main Event 3/12/88	March 10, 2018	1h 16m
92	WrestleMania 19	March 16, 2018	3h 51m
93	The First Draft (2002)	March 23, 2018	2h 39m
94	WrestleMania IV	March 30, 2018	2h 54m
95	Goldberg	April 6, 2018	3h 3m
96	RAW (4/13/98 - Austin vs. McMahon)	April 13, 2018	2h 10m
97	Rob Van Dam	April 20, 2018	3h 55m
98	Unforgiven 1998	April 27, 2018	1h 59m
99	The Big Boss Man	May 4, 2018	3h 13m
100	Brother Love	May 11, 2018	2h 48m
101	The 1992 Royal Rumble	May 12, 2018	2h 50m
102	The British Bulldog	May 18, 2018	3h 38m
103	#LovetoKnow	May 25, 2018	1h 48m
104	Bob Holly	June 1, 2018	3h 46m
105	King of the Ring 1993	June 8, 2018	2h 21m
106	Bad Blood 2003	June 15, 2018	2h 7m
107	Sable	June 22, 2018	3h 13m
108	King of the Ring 1998	June 29, 2018	2h 19m
109	Brutus "the Barber" Beefcake	July 6, 2018	2h 59m
110	Muhammed Hassan	July 13, 2018	2h 2m
111	Invasion PPV 2001	July 20, 2018	2h 41m
112	Vengeance 2003	July 27, 2018	2h 19m
113	SummerSlam 1997	August 3, 2018	2h 26m
114	Hulk Hogan's 1989–1990	August 10, 2018	2h 40m
115	SummerSlam 1998	August 17, 2018	2h 17m
116	The First SmackDown!	August 24, 2018	2h 12m
117	SummerSlam 1988	August 31, 2018	2h 36m
118	#LoveToKnow	September 7, 2018	1h 18m
119	The SmackDown after 9/11	September 14, 2018	1h 49m
120	Unforgiven 2008	September 21, 2018	2h 18m
121	In Your House: Breakdown 1998	September 28, 2018	2h 10m
122	Carlito	October 5, 2018	2h 6m
123	Rikishi	October 12, 2018	1h 55m
124	Judgment Day 1998	October 19, 2018	1h 45m
125	When Hunter Married Stephanie	October 26, 2018	2h 3m
126	Daniel Puder & the Hardcore Title	November 2, 2018	3h 6m
127	William Regal	November 9, 2018	3h 3m
128	Survivor Series 1998	November 16, 2018	2h 27m
129	Survivor Series 1988	November 22, 2018	2h 45m
130	Survivor Series 1993	November 23, 2018	2h 16m
131	Christian	November 30, 2018	3h 13m
132	D-Generation X: In Your House	December 7, 2018	1h 51m
133	Rock Bottom 1998	December 14, 2018	2h 37m
134	Raw: December 22, 1997	December 21, 2018	1h 45m
135	Foley Wins the Title	December 28, 2018	1h 43m
136	"Mean" Gene Okerlund Tribute	January 4, 2019	1h 34m
137	Royal Rumble 1999	January 11, 2019	2h 27m
138	Royal Rumble 2004	January 18, 2019	2h 19m
139	Sid	January 25, 2019	2h 53m
140	Gorilla Monsoon	February 1, 2019	1h 46m
141	St. Valentine's Day Massacre	February 8, 2019	2h 4m
142	No Way Out 2004	February 15, 2019	2h 11m
143	The Undertaker 2004-2006	February 22, 2019	2h 29m
144	Jerry 'The King' Lawler	March 1, 2019	3h 45m
145	Stone Cold Steve Austin's 1997	March 8, 2019	1h 40m
146	WrestleMania XX	March 15, 2019	1h 36m
147	WrestleMania X	March 22, 2019	2h 13m
148	WrestleMania X-Seven	March 29, 2019	2h 28m
149	Michael "P.S." Hayes	April 5, 2019	1h 28m
150	Stone Cold Steve Austin's 1998-99	April 12, 2019	2h 32m
151	Backlash 2004	April 19, 2019	2h 0m
152	The best of Triple H	April 26, 2019	1h 50m
153	JBL	May 3, 2019	2h 55m
154	Raw is War (05/10/1999)	May 10, 2019	1h 46m
155	The Roast of Bruce Prichard	May 17, 2019	1h 59m
156	Judgment Day 2004	May 24, 2019	1h 50m
157	#LOVETOKNOW	May 31, 2019	1h
158	AJ Styles in TNA	June 7, 2019	1h 25m
159	WWF RAW 06.09.97 Watch Along	June 14, 2019	1h 45m
160	Greatest Fights	June 21, 2019	1h 44m
161	King of the Ring 1994	June 25, 2019	2h 24m
162	King of the Ring 1999	June 28, 2019	1h 44m
163	WCW Monday Nitro (07/06/1998)	July 5, 2019	2h 31m
164	Fully Loaded 1999	July 12, 2019	1h 35m
165	JR	July 19, 2019	2h 34m
166	#LovetoKnow	July 26, 2019	2h 2m
167	The Rock 2001-04	August 2, 2019	2h 22m
168	Three Year Retrospective	August 6, 2019	3h 18m
169	20 Years of Jericho (1999–2001)	August 9, 2019	2h 30m
170	SummerSlam 2004	August 16, 2019	1h 51m
171	SummerSlam 1999	August 23, 2019	1h 39m
172	SummerSlam 1989	August 30, 2019	2h 47m
173	Ground Zero: In Your House	September 6, 2019	1h 21m
174	IYH3: Triple Threat	September 13, 2019	1h 43m
175	RAW (09/22/97 - Austin stuns McMahon)	September 20, 2019	1h 30m
176	Yokozuna	September 27, 2019	3h
177	No Mercy 2004	October 4, 2019	1h 48m
178	Taz	October 11, 2019	1h 56m
179	#AskBruce	October 18, 2019	1h 40m
180	Halloween Havoc 1998	October 25, 2019	3h 21m
181	The Fabulous Moolah	November 1, 2019	1h 33m
182	Classic SETW: Vince Russo	November 8, 2019	1h 53m
183	The Wrestling Classic	November 12, 2019	2h 30m
184	Survivor Series 1999	November 15, 2019	1h 45m
185	Survivor Series '94	November 22, 2019	1h 47m
186	Survivor Series '89	November 28, 2019	2h 45m
187	This Tuesday in Texas	December 6, 2019	1h 43m
188	Classic SETW: "Rowdy" Roddy Piper	December 13, 2019	1h 58m
189	Ask Bruce Anything!	December 20, 2019	1h 7m
190	Jimmy Hart	December 27, 2019	1h 24m
191	Armageddon '99	January 1, 2020	1h 38m
192	The Iron Sheik	January 3, 2020	1h 13m
193	New Year's Revolution (2005)	January 10, 2020	1h 27m
194	Royal Rumble '90	January 17, 2020	1h 55m
195	Royal Rumble '95	January 24, 2020	2h 8m
196	The Radicalz Revisited	January 31, 2020	1h 35m
197	Deep Cuts: The Early Years	February 7, 2020	2h 2m
198	Sherri Martel	February 14, 2020	1h 50m
199	No Way Out 2005	February 21, 2020	1h 40m
200	Ricky "The Dragon" Steamboat	February 28, 2020	2h 2m
201	Val Venis	March 6, 2020	2h 12m
202	Flair Flashback	March 13, 2020	1h 8m
203	#ASKBRUCE	March 20, 2020	1h 12m
204	WrestleMania XI	March 27, 2020	2h 7m
205	WrestleMania 21	April 3, 2020	2h 1m
206	Paul Bearer	April 10, 2020	2h 15m
207	Nailz	April 18, 2020	1h 19m
208	Ending the Streak	April 24, 2020	2h 33m
209	Hacksaw Jim Duggan	April 26, 2020	1h 52m
210	Backlash 2005	April 26, 2020	1h 48m
211	Tito Santana	May 8, 2020	1h 57m
212	Survivor Series 2018	May 15, 2020	1h 46m
213	Judgment Day 2005	May 22, 2020	2h 4m
214	Hornswoggle	May 29, 2020	2h 1m
215	In Your House 1	June 5, 2020	2h 1m
216	ECW One Night Stand 2005	June 12, 2020	1h 52m
217	EARTHQUAKE	June 19, 2020	1h 44m
218	Plans, Kings and Slams!	June 26, 2020	1h 49m
219	Vengeance (2005)	June 28, 2020	1h 25m
220	Conrad Meets Bruce	July 3, 2020	1h 36m
221	Slammiversary XV	July 6, 2020	2h 32m
222	Kevin Nash in the WWF	July 10, 2020	2h 15m
223	In Your House 2	July 17, 2020	2h 25m
225	The Great American Bash (2005)	July 24, 2020	2h
226	Saturday Night's Main Event (07/28/90)	August 1, 2020	1h 49m
227	Ask Bruce Anything	August 7, 2020	2h 12m
228	Bob Backlund	August 14, 2020	1h 49m
229	SummerSlam (2005)	August 21, 2020	2h 32m
230	The Rock (1999)	August 21, 2020	2h 23m
231	Honky Tonk Man	September 11, 2020	2h 31m
232	Unforgiven 2005	September 18, 2020	1h 53m
233	SNME 4.28.90 & Eric Fires Back	September 25, 2020	3h 5m
234	Rick Martel	October 2, 2020	2h 17m
235	No Mercy 2005	October 9, 2020	2h 24m
236	SNME 10.13.90	October 16, 2020	2h 8m
237	Vintage Something to Wrestle without Conrad	October 23, 2020	1h 13m
238	In Your House 4	October 30, 2020	1h 54m
239	King Kong Bundy	November 6, 2020	1h 57m
240	Eddie Guerrero	November 13, 2020	2h 46m
241	Survivor Series 1995	November 20, 2020	2h 6m
242	Survivor Series 2005	November 27, 2020	2h 39m
243	Pat Patterson	December 5, 2020	2h 5m
244	The Very Best of Pat Patterson	December 6, 2020	2h 25m
245	Pat Patterson - My Way	December 11, 2020	1h 56m
246	In Your House 5	December 18, 2020	2h 4m
247	No Holds Barred Watch Along	December 25, 2020	1h 46m
248	Ask Bruce Anything	December 26, 2020	1h 36m
249	Raw Is FEDERLINE! 01.01.07	January 1, 2021	1h 2m
250	The Bushwhackers	January 8, 2021	2h 9m
251	Shane McMahon	January 24, 2021	2h 20m
252	Royal Rumble 1991	February 5, 2021	1h 51m
253	Something to Wrestle LIVE in Vegas!	February 7, 2021	1h 59m
254	Bruce On The Ross Report	February 8, 2021	1h 30m
255	Royal Rumble 1996	February 12, 2021	1h 51m
256	In Your House 6	February 19, 2021	1h 44m
257	The Main Event V - 02-01-91	February 26, 2021	1h 44m
258	SNME 03.18.06	March 5, 2021	1h 33m
259	REMIX - Dusty Goes to the WWF	March 12, 2021	1h 30m
260	REMIX - Eric Bischoff in the WWE	March 19, 2021	3h 9m
261	REMIX IYH: In Your House 18: Badd Blood 1997	March 26, 2021	3h 17m
262	Ask Bruce Anything	March 27, 2021	1h 35m
263	WrestleMania XII	April 2, 2021	2h 26m
264	WrestleMania 22	April 9, 2021	1h 59m
265	REMIX - Jeff Jarrett	April 16, 2021	4h 38m
266	REMIX - Michael Hayes	April 23, 2021	2h 2m
267	In Your House 7	April 30, 2021	1h 59m
268	Backlash 2006	May 7, 2021	1h 29m
269	REMIX - Shawn Michaels 1993	May 14, 2021	2h 48m
270	"Dr. Death" Steve Williams	May 20, 2021	1h 46m
271	REMIX Shawn Michaels 1994–95	May 21, 2021	3h 36m
272	Kevin Nash Part 2	May 30, 2021	1h 59m
273	Ahmed Johnson	June 7, 2021	2h 9m
274	The Undertaker 1998	June 11, 2021	1h 59m
275	REMIX The Undertaker 1995–1997	June 18, 2021	4h 40m
276	The Undertaker 1999	June 18, 2021	2h 0m
277	King of the Ring 2001	July 2, 2021	1h 41m
278	Bret Hart 1993	July 9, 2021	2h 5m
279	IYH 9 - International Incident	July 16, 2021	1h 45m
280	REMIX: The Rise of John Cena	July 23, 2021	3h 24m
281	Trish Stratus	July 30, 2021	2h 6m
282	Ask Bruce Anything	August 5, 2021	1h 54m
283	Faarooq	August 16, 2021	2h 15m
284	Bruce Prichard: In His Own Words pt.1	August 20, 2021	6h 50m
285	Bruce Prichard: In His Own Words pt.2	August 20, 2021	3h 53m
286	SummerSlam 2006	August 27, 2021	1h 45m
287	Bam Bam Bigelow	September 3, 2021	2h 3m
288	Greg "The Hammer" Valentine	September 14, 2021	1h 40m
289	Unforgiven 2006	September 17, 2021	2h 7m
290	IYH: Mind Games	September 24, 2021	2h 3m
291	Vince vs The World	October 1, 2021	4h 25m
292	No Mercy 2006	October 8, 2021	1h 43m
293	IYH 11 - Buried Alive	October 15, 2021	2h 16m
294	Ask Bruce Anything	October 22, 2021	1h 52m
295	Mid-South Wrestling Memories	October 30, 2021	2h 57m
296	Cyber Sunday 2006	November 8, 2021	1h 41m
297	Montreal Screwjob REMIX	November 12, 2021	3h 32m
298	Survivor Series 1996	November 19, 2021	2h 8m
299	Survivor Series 2006	November 26, 2021	2h 0m
300	Armageddon 2006	December 4, 2021	1h 41m
301	IYH 12 - It's Time!	December 11, 2021	2h 5m
302	Shawn Michaels 1996	December 20, 2021	1h 45m
303	The Undertaker 1993-1999 Megasode	December 28, 2021	10h 21m
304	Hulk Hogan 87-90 Megasode	January 3, 2022	6h 25m
305	Chris Masters	January 7, 2022	1h 45m
306	Royal Rumble 2002	January 14, 2022	2h 11m
307	Royal Rumble 2005	January 21, 2022	1h 58m
308	The Rock 97-99 Megasode	February 2, 2022	5h 26m
309	ECW Megasode	February 4, 2022	7h 18m
310	Ken Shamrock	February 11, 2022	2h 1m
311	Stone Cold Megasode	February 18, 2022	8h 3m
312	Ask Bruce Anything - STW Patreon Megasode	February 25, 2022	4h 46m
313	No Way Out 2002	March 7, 2022	2h 0m
314	Vader REMIX	March 11, 2022	3h 20m
315	Bruce Prichard's Craziest Moments	March 16, 2022	8h 28m
316	WrestleMania 7-11 MEGASODE	March 18, 2022	10h 50m
317	WrestleMania 18	March 25, 2022	2h 3m
318	WrestleMania 12-15 Megasode	April 1, 2022	8h 52m
319	WrestleMania 19-22 Megasode	April 8, 2022	9h 14m
320	In Your House 1-3 Megasode	April 15, 2022	5h 46m
321	Ask Bruce Anything 04.22.22	April 22, 2022	2h 21m
322	In Your House 4-6 Megasode	April 29, 2022	4h 43m
333 [sic]	Randy Orton 2002-2004	April 30, 2022	1h 37m
334	In Your House 7-9 Megasode	May 7, 2022	5h 40m
335	Hercules	May 13, 2022	2h 1m
336	In Your House - Cold Day in Hell	May 20, 2022	1h 51m
337	Something Else to Wrestle - WrestleMania 14	May 31, 2022	2h 5m
338	Memorable Matches	June 3, 2022	4h 34m
339	Bruce Returns to IMPACT	June 10, 2022	1h 51m
340	Something NEW to Wrestle With...	June 17, 2022	2h 16m
341	King of the Ring 1993-96 MEGASODE	June 24, 2022	7h 19m
342	King of the Ring 98-99-01 MEGASODE	July 1, 2022	5h 22m
343	Kevin Nash MEGASODE	July 8, 2022	4h 9m
344	Bruce's Big WCW Adventure!	July 15, 2022	5h 56m
345	WCW in the WWE MEGASODE	July 22, 2022	7h 1m
346	SummerSlam 1996-99 MEGASODE	July 29, 2022	8h 45m
347	SummerSlam 88-90 MEGASODE	August 5, 2022	7h 41m
348	SummerSlam 2004-06 MEGASODE	August 12, 2022	5h 42m
349	SummerSlam 00 & 02 MEGASODE	August 19, 2022	5h 34m
350	Bret Hart 94–95	August 26, 2022	1h 42m
351	Shawn Michaels 1997–98	September 2, 2022	2h 32m
352	The British Invasion Megasode	September 9, 2022	6h 51m
353	Brock Lesnar MEGASODE	September 16, 2022	2h 37m
354	One Night Only 1997	September 23, 2022	1h 36m
355	Ask Bruce Anything 09.30.22	September 30, 2022	1h 49m
356	Hell in a Cell - Retrospective	October 7, 2022	2h 7m
357	The Godfather	October 17, 2022	1h 44m
358	Hogan Must Return	October 21, 2022	2h 5m
359	Cyber Sunday 2007	October 28, 2022	1h 54m
360	Montreal Screwjob MegaMix	November 4, 2022	2h 4m
361	Montreal: from Both Sides	November 11, 2022	1h 55m
362	Miss Elizabeth	November 18, 2022	1h 43m
363	Survivor Series 1992	November 25, 2022	2h 12m
364	The Legion of Doom	December 3, 2022	2h 26m
365	Armageddon 2002	December 9, 2022	2h 20m
366	Armageddon 2007	December 17, 2022	2h 3m
367	Box Of Gimmicks	December 23, 2022	2h 36m
368	Ask Bruce Stuff and Shit	January 2, 2023	2h 27m
369	Prime Time Wrestling & The Creation of RAW Megasode	January 6, 2023	4h 22m
370	The Best of Stephanie McMahon	January 13, 2023	1h 49m
371	Royal Rumble - The 90s Recap!	January 20, 2023	2h 52m
372	Bruce's Top 30 Monday Night RAW Moments	January 27, 2023	1h 38m
373	Royal Rumble 1989	February 3, 2023	2h 12m
374	The Life and Legacy of Lanny Poffo aka The Genius	February 10, 2023	2h 16m
375	Epic WrestleMania Matches vol. 1	February 17, 2023	2h 5m
376	No Way Out 2008	February 25, 2023	2h 27m
377	WrestleMania Matches and Moments	March 3, 2023	2h 19m
378	WrestleMania V	March 10, 2023	2h 16m
379	WrestleMania 17 & 18	March 17, 2023	4h 18m
380	Royal Rumble 1998 REMIX	March 24, 2023	2h 55m
381	WrestleMania 9 - 30th Anniversary REMIX	March 31, 2023	3h 12m
382	The Bushwhackers REMIX	April 7, 2023	2h 14m
383	WrestleMania 24	April 7, 2023	2h 14m
384	TNA Victory Road 2011	April 21, 2023	2h 11m
385	Unforgiven 1998 - 25th Anniversary REMIX	April 28, 2023	1h 57m
386	In Your House - Revenge of the Taker	May 10, 2023	2h 3m
387	Ask Bruce Questions And S&*%	May 12, 2023	2h 2m
388	Over the Edge	May 22, 2023	2h 53m
389	King of the Ring 1993 REMIX	June 3, 2023	2h 22m
390	The End of Ken Shamrock in the WWF	June 5, 2023	1h 12m
391	King of the Ring 1997	June 12, 2023	1h 46m
392	Jacques Rougeau	June 17, 2023	1h 46m
393	King of the Ring 1998 25th Anniversary REMIX	June 23, 2023	2h 12m
394	The Best Of Something To Wrestle with Bruce Prichard	July 5, 2023	1h 42m
395	King of the Ring 1995	July 8, 2023	2h 5m
396	The Rise of John Cena Part 2	July 15, 2023	2h 12m
397	The Great American Bash 2008	July 21, 2023	2h 8m
398	The Best of Something to Wrestle Vol. 2	August 2, 2023	1h 44m
399	Sean Waltman	August 9, 2023	2h 19m
Bonus	The Best Of Something To Wrestle 08.15.23	August 16, 2023	1h 48m
400	Ask Bruce Anything 08.18.23	August 18, 2023	1h 58m
401	Ask Bruce More Questions and Shit	August 25, 2023	2h 12m
402	Remembering Terry Funk	August 28, 2023	2h 10m
403	Outlandinsh Wrestling Gimmicks	September 9, 2023	2h 20m
404	The Best of Something to Wrestle 09.15.23	September 19, 2023	2h 4m
405	The Best of Something to Wrestle 09.22.23	September 22, 2023	1h 51m
406	Batista	October 1, 2023	2h 23m
407	The Best of Something to Wrestle 10.06.23	October 2023	2h 15m
408	Box of Gimmicks 2	October 2023	2h 18m
409	The Best of Something to Wrestle 10.25.23	October 2023	2h 40m
410	Saturday Night's Main Event 11.02.85	November 2023	1h 51m
411	The Best of Something to Wrestle 11.03.23	November 2023	1h 51m
412	WWE Superstar Debuts	November 2023	2h 7m
413	WWE Superstar Debuts II	November 2023	1h 46m
414	Ask Bruce Anything 11.24.23	November 2023	2h 17m
415	The Hart Foundation	December 2023	1h 57m
416	Tag Me In! Bruce Prichard Tag Team Tales	December 2023	1h 43m
417	The Bad Guys	December 2023	2h 42m
418	Armageddon 2000	December 2023	2h 30m
419	One Man Gang/Akeem	December 2023	1h 56m
420	The Bad Guys II	January 2024	2h 27m
421	Tatanka	January 2024	2h 41m
422	Batista Unleashed	January 2024	2h 6m
423	Royal Rumble 2008	January 2024	1h 46m
424	Survivor Serious REMIX	February 2024	2h 27m
425	The Dudley Boys	February 2024	2h 15m
426	Bret Hart 1994/1996 REMIX	February 2024	1h 41m
427	The Territories	February 2024	2h 8m
428	The Territories II	February 2024	2h 11m
429	WrestleMania VII REMIX	March 2024	2h 16m
430	Masked Men	March 2024	2h 20m
431	Wrestlemania 2000	March 2024	2h 10m
432	Wrestlemania VIII	March 2024	1h 27m
433	WrestleMania 12 REDUX	April 2024	1h 42m
434	Backlash 2004 REMIX	April 2024	2h 13m
435	Rob Van Dam REMIX	April 2024	2h 16m
436	Judgement Day 2004	April 2024	2h 9m
437	Backlash 2005 REMIX	May 2024	1h 38m
438	John Cena Becomes The Man	May 2024	1h 51m
439	William Regal REMIX	May 2024	2h 54m
440	The Nasty Boys	May 2024	1h 31m
441	30th Anniversary of King of the Ring 1994	May 2024	2h 31m
442	Ask Bruce Anything 06.03.24	June 2024	2h 17m
443	Mick Foley	June 2024	1h 29m
444	Ask Bruce Anything 06.17.24	June 2024	2h 2m
445	Great American Bash 2004	June 2024	2h 25m
446	Night of Champions 2008	July 2024	2h 5m
447	The Last Nitro! REMIX	July 2024	2h 8m
448	Vengeance 2004	July 2024	1h 32m
449	The Three Faces of Foley	July 2024	1h 25m
450	Great American Bash 2006	July 2024	1h 52m
451	The Godfather REMIX	August 2024	1h 18m
452	KANE	August 2024	2h 7m
453	Milk-A-Mania!	August 2024	1h 50m
454	SummerSlam 1994	August 2024	2h 3m
455	Sgt. Slaughter	September 2024	2h 7m
456	Bad Blood 2003 REMIX	September 2024	2h 10m
457	Mr. Perfect REMIX	September 2024	3h 18m
458	Jim Cornette REMIX	September 2024	2h 59m
459	The Powers of Pain	October 2024	2h 10m
460	Ask Bruce Anything	October 2024	1h 40m
461	Bruce Isn't Finished: Ask Bruce Anything Part Deux 10.15.24	October 2024	1h 22m
462	Bruce in GWF!	October 2024	2h 21m

== Notes ==
1.This episode was originally released as Episode 462: Ask Bruce Anything Part 3. However, due to Bruce being intoxicated, the podcast was quickly taken down and reuploaded with Bruce in the GWF.
