= XWC =

XWC may refer to:

- The Xbox Wireless Controller
- The Woccon language (ISO 639 code xwc)
- The Xtreme Wrestling Center in Kansas City, Missouri
