= Jim Ross =

American professional wrestling commentator (born 1952)

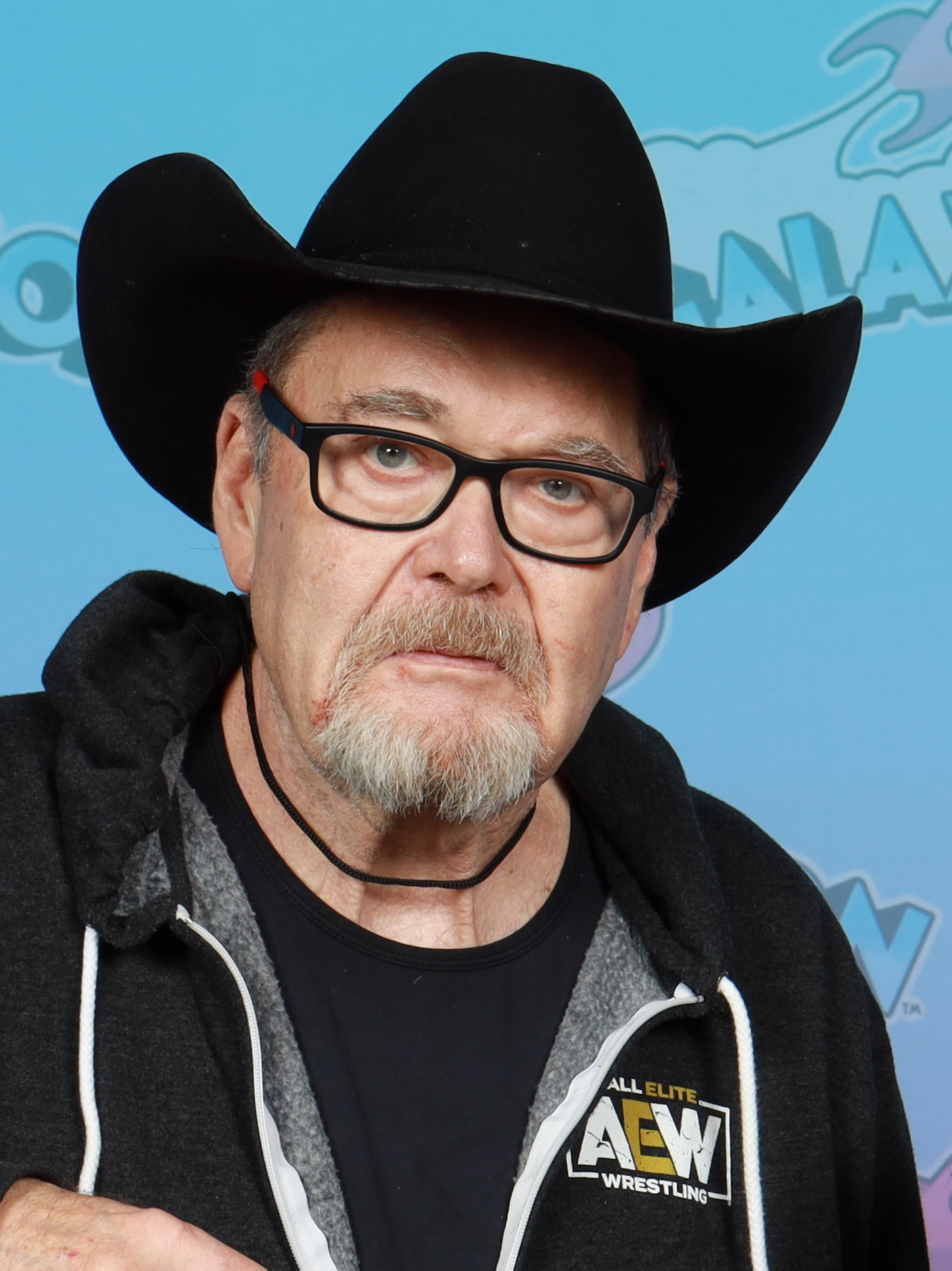
- Ross in 2025

Personal information
- Born: James William Ross; January 3, 1952 (age 74) Fort Bragg, California, U.S.
- Education: Northeastern State University
- Spouse: Jan Grillette (m. 1993; died 2017)
- Children: 2
- Website: jrsbbq.com

Professional wrestling career
- Ring name: Jim Ross
- Billed height: 5 ft 9 in (175 cm)
- Billed weight: 258 lb (117 kg)
- Billed from: Norman, Oklahoma
- Debut: 1974

YouTube information
- Channel: Grilling JR with Jim Ross
- Years active: 2020–present
- Genre: Professional wrestling
- Subscribers: 118 thousand
- Views: 36.8 million
- Last updated: September 21, 2026

James William Ross (born January 3, 1952) is an American professional wrestling commentator, sports announcer, and podcaster. He is signed with All Elite Wrestling (AEW), where he serves as a commentator as well as an analyst and senior advisor. Ross is best known for a long and distinguished career as a play-by-play commentator for WWE. Known affectionately by WWE fans as "Good Ol' JR", Ross has been labeled as the greatest wrestling commentator of all time. Ross, while in WWE, was occasionally involved in storylines and also participated in nine wrestling matches from 1999 to 2011.

After years of working various jobs in the professional wrestling industry, Ross became the primary play-by-play announcer for Mid-South Wrestling in the early 1980s. He went on to do commentary for the National Wrestling Alliance (NWA)'s World Championship Wrestling territory, before jumping to the World Wrestling Federation (WWF, now WWE), making his first appearance for the promotion at WrestleMania IX in 1993. During his tenure with WWF/WWE, Ross was widely regarded as the voice of the company, particularly during the Attitude Era of the late 1990s and early 2000s. He was also the lead English-language announcer for New Japan Pro-Wrestling on AXS TV from 2015 to 2018 and has occasionally done play-by-play for boxing and mixed martial arts fights. He has been inducted into the WWE, NWA and Wrestling Observer Newsletter halls of fame, and has been honored by the George Tragos/Lou Thesz Professional Wrestling Hall of Fame twice.

Outside of wrestling, Ross is known for his barbecue sauce and beef jerky brand, J.R.'s Family BBQ. He also hosts his own weekly podcast, Grilling JR.

== Early life ==
James William Ross was born on January 3, 1952, in Fort Bragg, California. He is an enrolled citizen of the Cherokee Nation, tracing his ancestry to family members who arrived in Oklahoma on the Trail of Tears. In 2022, Ross sold land originally allotted to his great-great-grandfather by the Bureau of Indian Affairs.

Ross was raised in Westville, Oklahoma, where his maternal grandparents operated a general store. His paternal grandfather, Dee Ross, worked as a carpenter and owned an off-sale beer establishment. At Westville High School, Ross was active in athletics and student leadership. He played first base for the school's baseball team and was a two-time all-conference football player for the Westville Yellowjackets during the 1968 and 1969 seasons. He also served as student body president and earned four varsity letters in basketball. He earned a President's Council Leadership scholarship to Oklahoma State University, where he was enrolled for one semester before leaving due to poor grades and eventually transferring to Northeastern State University.

Beyond athletics, Ross was heavily involved in the Future Farmers of America (FFA). He won the Oklahoma FFA Speech Championship in both 1968 and 1969 and placed as runner-up in the national competition in 1969. That same year, he was elected treasurer of Oklahoma Boys State and was nominated by Representative Wiley Sparkman to serve as a page in the Oklahoma House of Representatives. In 1970, he received the FFA State Degree—the organization's second-highest honor—and was elected vice president of the FFA Northeast District. He was also named honorable mention center on the Tulsa World's 1969 Oklahoma High School All-State Football team.

Academically, Ross was inducted into the National Honor Society as a sophomore and received recognition for maintaining a 3.6 GPA during his junior year. After high school, he remained involved in athletics by officiating high school and college baseball, football, and basketball games across Oklahoma for 18 years.

== Broadcasting career ==
=== Professional wrestling ===
==== NWA Tri-State, Mid-South Wrestling, and Universal Wrestling Federation (1974–1987) ====
While attending Northeastern State University, Ross gained early broadcasting experience by working for the college radio station. This background led to his entry into professional wrestling commentary when he was offered a position with the local NWA Tri-State promotion, stepping in for an announcer who was unexpectedly unavailable for an event.

Ross began his career with the promotion in 1974 as a referee, a role he held until 1977 before transitioning to the broadcast team. Following Bill Watts's acquisition of NWA Tri-State in 1982 and its rebranding as Mid-South Wrestling (later Universal Wrestling Federation), Ross was promoted to lead play-by-play announcer. He also assumed administrative responsibilities as the promotion's Vice President of Marketing. During his tenure, he called his first NWA World Heavyweight Championship match, featuring Ric Flair and Ted DiBiase.

==== Jim Crockett Promotions and World Championship Wrestling (1987–1993) ====
In 1987, following Jim Crockett Jr.'s acquisition of the Universal Wrestling Federation and its merger with Jim Crockett Promotions, Ross joined the newly combined organization as a color commentator. He worked alongside David Crockett and Tony Schiavone and was soon promoted to lead play-by-play announcer for the National Wrestling Alliance (NWA).

Ross continued in this role as JCP was purchased by Turner Broadcasting System and rebranded to World Championship Wrestling (WCW). Following WCW's departure from the NWA in 1991, Ross was paired with longtime NWA commentator Bob Caudle, and also Paul E. Dangerously. Around this time, Ross briefly expanded into mainstream sports broadcasting, serving as a commentator for one season of Atlanta Falcons radio coverage in 1992.

Over time, Ross advanced to become WCW's head of broadcasting. However, his tenure was marked by a strained professional relationship with Eric Bischoff, a rising commentator and future executive. Ross later claimed that Bischoff effectively promoted himself to WCW's leadership, ultimately leading to a shift in internal dynamics. Conversely, Bischoff alleged that Ross had shown favoritism under the direction of then-WCW booker Bill Watts. In 1993, after Bischoff was promoted to executive producer, Ross requested and was granted a release from his contract. Although Ross had a three-year agreement with Turner Broadcasting System, he opted for an immediate buyout, citing concerns that he would be side-lined from on-air work for an extended period. According to wrestler Mick Foley, Ross also resigned from WCW's booking committee around this time. He officially departed WCW after being removed from television by Bischoff.

==== World Wrestling Federation / World Wrestling Entertainment (1993–2013) ====
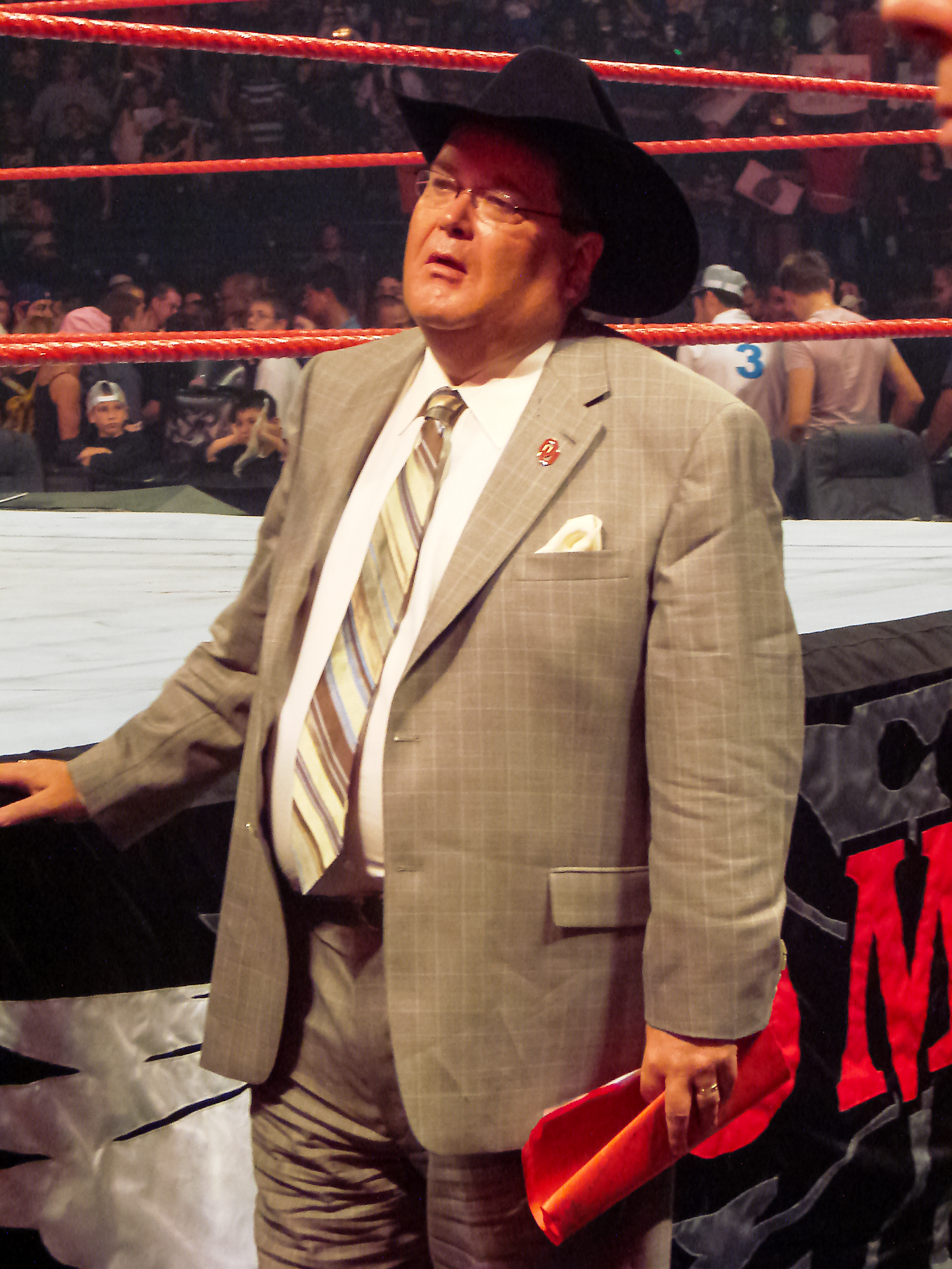
Ross at the 2007 No Mercy

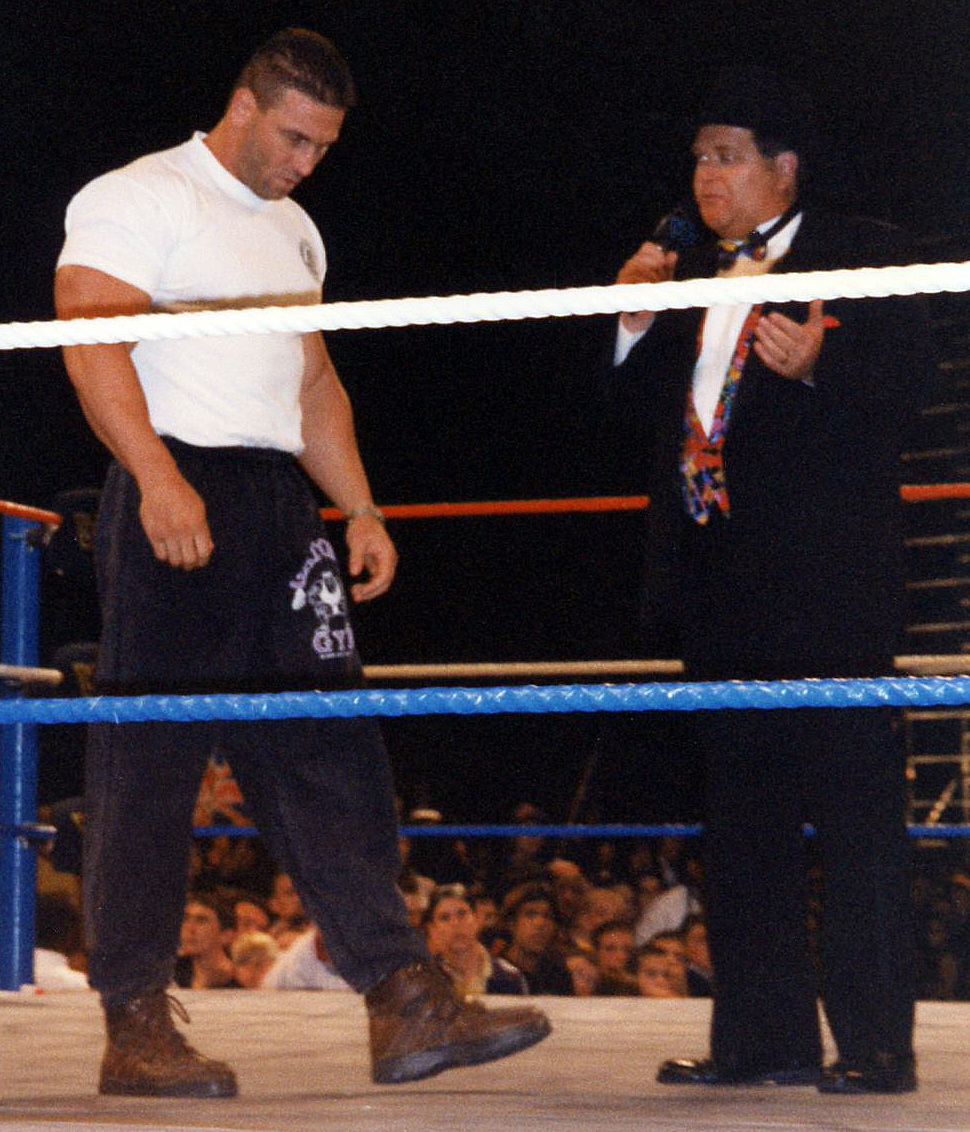
Ross was mainly used as a commentator, but occasionally hosted in-ring interviews such as here with Ken Shamrock.

Jim Ross joined the World Wrestling Federation (WWF, later WWE) in early 1993 and made his on-screen debut at WrestleMania IX, held at Caesars Palace in Las Vegas. He replaced Gorilla Monsoon on Wrestling Challenge and worked with Bobby Heenan until Heenan's departure later that year. Ross also called major pay-per-view events, including WrestleMania IX and King of the Ring, before Vince McMahon resumed lead commentary duties beginning with SummerSlam 1993.

Ross pitched the idea for Radio WWF, a short-lived radio program where he and Gorilla Monsoon discussed wrestling news and interviewed talent. They also called select events such as SummerSlam, Survivor Series 1993, and the 1994 Royal Rumble for the broadcast.

While acknowledging the weakened influence Vince McMahon was getting as a result of the government investigation against him and some major changes to WWF talent which occurred in tandem with his debut in the company, such as Luna Vachon now being able to use her "bizarro type" gimmick after debuting at Wrestlemania IX, "The Lone Riders" Kip Winchester and Brett Colt being able to debut in the company just after Wrestlemania IX under revamped Billy and Bart Gunn and being given the cowboy-themed tag team gimmick The Smoking Gunns, Bryan Clark being revamped as "Adam Bomb," and also Mike Shaw, who Ross previously got signed to WCW as "Norman the Lunatic," being signed to the WWF-where he became known as "The Bastion Booger"-, Ross has stated that he was at the time only employed as an on-screen talent. Barrett Media also described Ross' relationship with the WWF at this time as a "roller coaster ride."

In January 1994, Ross suffered his first bout of Bell's palsy. He was released by the company two weeks later, on February 11. Afterward, Ross worked as an announcer for Smoky Mountain Wrestling, reuniting with longtime broadcast partner Bob Caudle, and resumed duties with the NFL's Atlanta Falcons.

Ross was briefly rehired in mid-1994 during Vince McMahon's federal trial, providing commentary on Monday Night Raw alongside Randy Savage while McMahon was absent. After McMahon's acquittal, Ross was released again, reportedly due to leaking company information. He returned once more to Smoky Mountain Wrestling.

In December 1994, Ross rejoined WWF for a third time. Initially relegated to syndicated programming, he returned to the main announce team in 1996. That September, Ross turned heel in an on-screen storyline where he claimed to be bringing back Razor Ramon and Diesel—characters previously portrayed by Scott Hall and Kevin Nash. On Raw, he delivered a worked-shoot promo criticizing Vince McMahon and introduced new performers in those roles. The angle was widely panned and dropped soon after.

Following this, Ross resumed his commentary duties across various shows, including Superstars, Action Zone, Raw Is War, and Shotgun Saturday Night. In December 1998, while broadcasting Capital Carnage in London, he suffered a second Bell's palsy attack shortly after learning of his mother's death. He returned to Raw on March 8, 1999, in a storyline where he confronted Michael Cole, his on-air replacement. Ross claimed he had been fired because of his condition and tried to reclaim his commentary role, even setting up his own desk labeled "JR Is Raw". The crowd support led the WWF to reinstate Ross permanently, starting with WrestleMania XV. It was in this era that his use of the phrase 'like a government mule' became particularly prominent.

Later that year, WCW parodied Ross's condition through a controversial character named "Oklahoma", portrayed by Ed Ferrara. The parody was widely criticized, and WCW discontinued it following intervention by Turner Standards and Practices. Though offended, Ross later said he did not hold Ferrara personally responsible.

In 2001, Ross was assigned to the commentary team for WWF's XFL football league. Initially on regional broadcasts with Jerry Lawler, Ross was later promoted to lead the national telecast alongside Jesse Ventura after the original host, Matt Vasgersian, publicly criticized the production. Ross returned to regional broadcasts midway through the season.

Throughout the Monday Night War, Ross became recognized as the voice of Raw, forming a legendary commentary team with Lawler. After WWE introduced a brand split in 2002, Ross worked exclusively on Raw and its pay-per-views.

Outside commentary, Ross served as Executive Vice President of Talent Relations, where he was key in hiring and developing talent. He stepped away from his executive roles in 2005, citing health, family, and personal business goals.

In October 2005, Ross was written off television after being "fired" by Vince and Linda McMahon. In reality, he needed time off for colon surgery. Joey Styles filled in during Ross's recovery. Ross returned in 2006 to call Saturday Night's Main Event XXXII, WrestleMania 22, and Backlash, and resumed his position on Raw in May after Styles exited in a storyline.

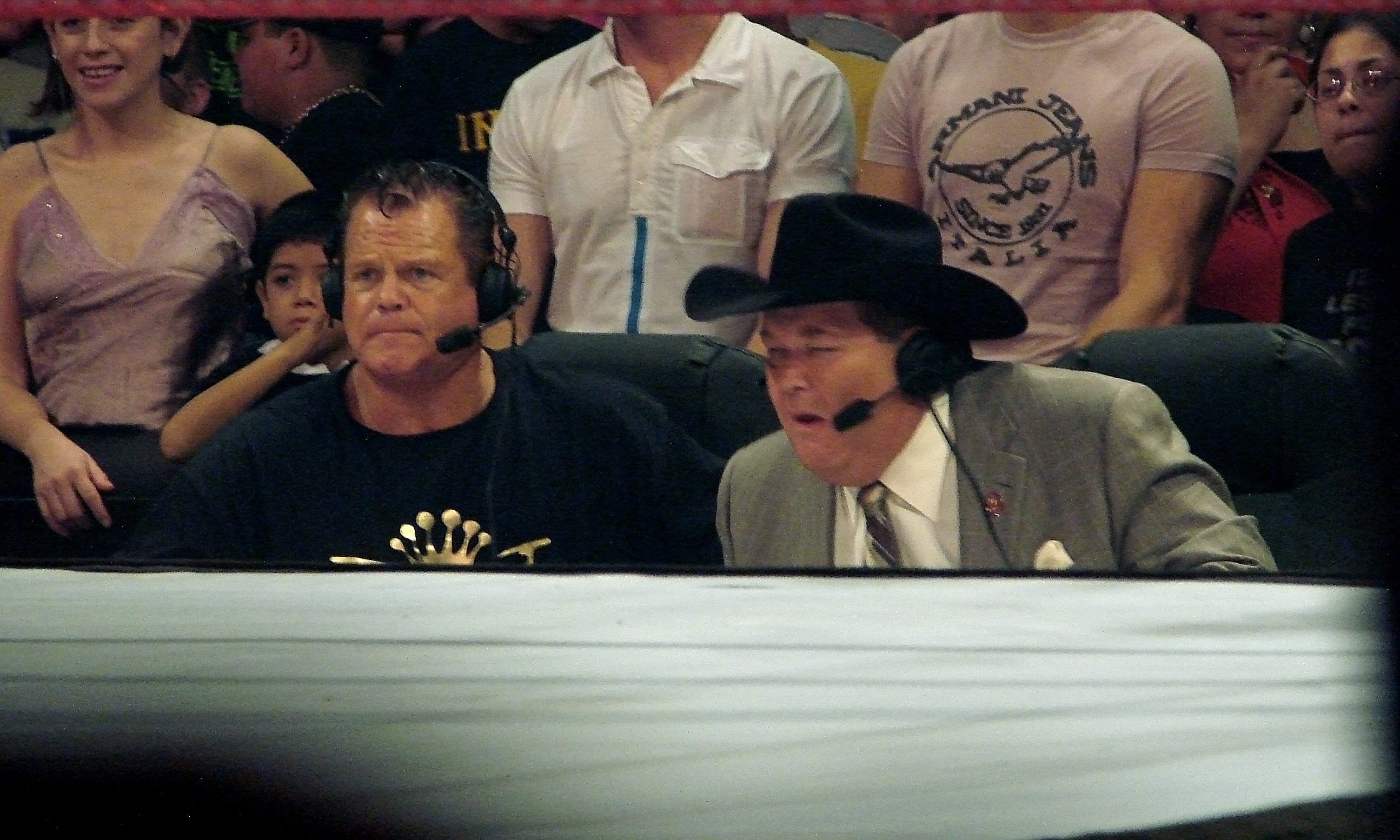
Jerry Lawler (left) and Jim Ross (right) at the Raw commentators table.

Ross's contract expired in October 2006, but he continued on a week-to-week basis until signing a one-year deal in November. On March 31, 2007, he was inducted into the WWE Hall of Fame by "Stone Cold" Steve Austin.

In the 2008 WWE Draft, Ross was unexpectedly moved from Raw to SmackDown, ending his 12-year run on the red brand. He was initially unhappy, stating he had not been informed of the decision, but later pledged to help make SmackDown the best show possible.

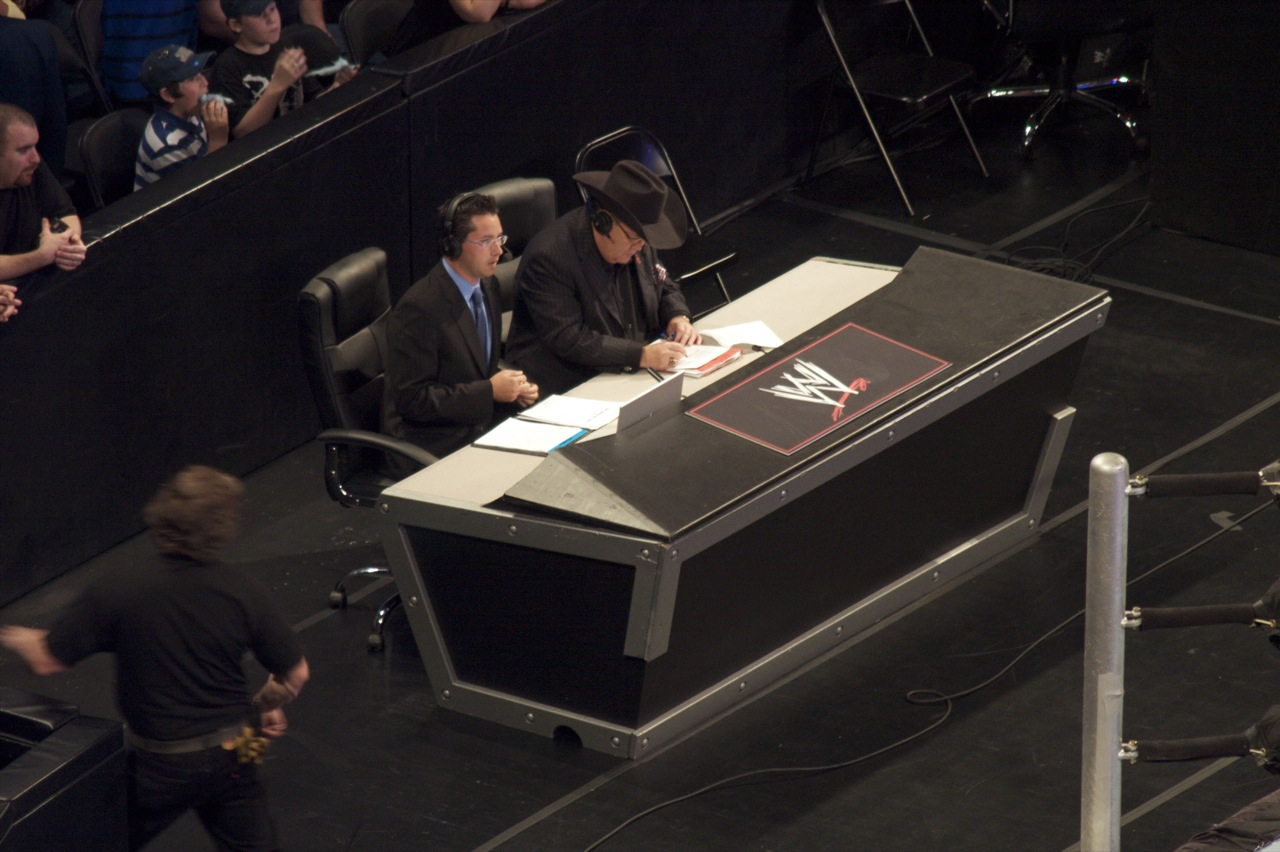
Ross (right) during his run on SmackDown with fellow commentator Todd Grisham.

Ross made a one-night appearance on ECW in September 2008 and later became SmackDown's color commentator alongside Todd Grisham. His final full-time commentary appearance was Hell in a Cell on October 4, 2009. He suffered a third Bell's palsy attack later that month and took a leave from broadcasting.

Ross returned sporadically over the next few years. He appeared on the Old School Raw special in 2010 and resumed commentary in early 2011 during Jerry Lawler's feud with Michael Cole. He appeared at WrestleMania XXVII and other episodes of Raw, but was again "fired" in a storyline by John Laurinaitis. Ross later claimed he was not informed in advance about the firing. He returned briefly for matches and comedy segments through the remainder of 2011.

At WrestleMania XXVIII in 2012, Ross called the "End of an Era" Hell in a Cell match between The Undertaker and Triple H. He also contributed to Raw 1000 and began commentating on the revamped NXT, joining Byron Saxton and William Regal. That same year, Paul Levesque (Triple H) appointed Ross as an adviser and scout for Talent Relations. After Lawler's on-air heart attack on September 10, Ross filled in during his recovery. He was honored in his hometown during Raw on October 1, dubbed "JR Appreciation Night".

In 2013, Ross began mentoring new commentators at the WWE Performance Center. He returned for the 20th Anniversary of Raw.

On August 16, 2013, Ross hosted a WWE 2K14 panel where he appeared visibly fatigued and made unscripted comments, including criticism of a sponsor. Ric Flair, also on the panel, made controversial remarks. On September 11, Ross announced his departure from WWE, stating that his contract had expired. Though it was widely speculated that the panel led to his release, Ross later said that it was his comment about the sponsor that caused concern. He also denied being intoxicated, attributing his demeanor to Bell's palsy-related fatigue. Vince McMahon later confirmed the situation contributed to Ross's exit but said Ross left on his own terms and there was no lingering tension between them.

==== New Japan Pro-Wrestling (2015–2018) ====
On January 4, 2015, Ross and Matt Striker served as the English language commentators for Global Force Wrestling's presentation of New Japan Pro-Wrestling's Wrestle Kingdom 9 in Tokyo Dome pay-per-view.

On January 19, 2016, it was announced that Ross had signed to become the new lead announcer for NJPW's weekly program on AXS TV along with Josh Barnett. Ross's contract was directly with AXS TV and not NJPW. It was revealed in November 2018 that Barnett and Ross would no longer be doing NJPW commentary. In 2019 the New Japan World commentary team took over broadcasting the AXS shows until the contract ended in December of that year.

==== Independent circuit (2016–2019) ====
On October 8, 2016, Ross, along with Jim Cornette, provided commentary for What Culture Pro Wrestling's (WCPW) first iPPV, Refuse to Lose. On December 31, Ross was on commentary for the pilot episode of World of Sport Wrestling on ITV. On February 12, 2017, Ross returned to WCPW for commentary at the iPPV, True Destiny and for WCPW's Loaded tapings that same month.

==== Return to WWE (2017–2019) ====
On April 2, 2017, at WrestleMania 33, Ross returned to WWE, providing commentary for the main event No Holds Barred match between The Undertaker and Roman Reigns. Shortly after the event, it was announced that Ross had signed a two-year deal with the company. During the summer, Ross would provide commentary, alongside Lita, for the Mae Young Classic. On the January 22, 2018, episode of Raw 25 Years, Ross would reunite with Jerry Lawler as part of the commentary team that was at the Manhattan Center in which Ross was caught by several cameras sleeping. On April 8, 2018, at WrestleMania 34, Ross called the fifth annual André the Giant Memorial Battle Royal on the WrestleMania 34 pre-show, alongside Jerry Lawler and Byron Saxton. Ross's last televised appearance for WWE was part of the pre-show panel for the Greatest Royal Rumble on April 27, 2018.

Ross left WWE on March 27, 2019, after electing not to renew his contract. Ross stated that the reason for his WWE departure was because, "I had two bookings in 2018 and they weren't using me very much". Ross also attributed that another factor in his departure was Ross stating himself that, "I still think I can do play-by-play even though others that may surround Vince think I can't". In August 2019, Ross later revealed what he said to Vince McMahon before he left, stating "Vince, unlike you I still believe I can do it and there are other people who believe I can do it including some of your audience".

==== All Elite Wrestling (2019–present) ====
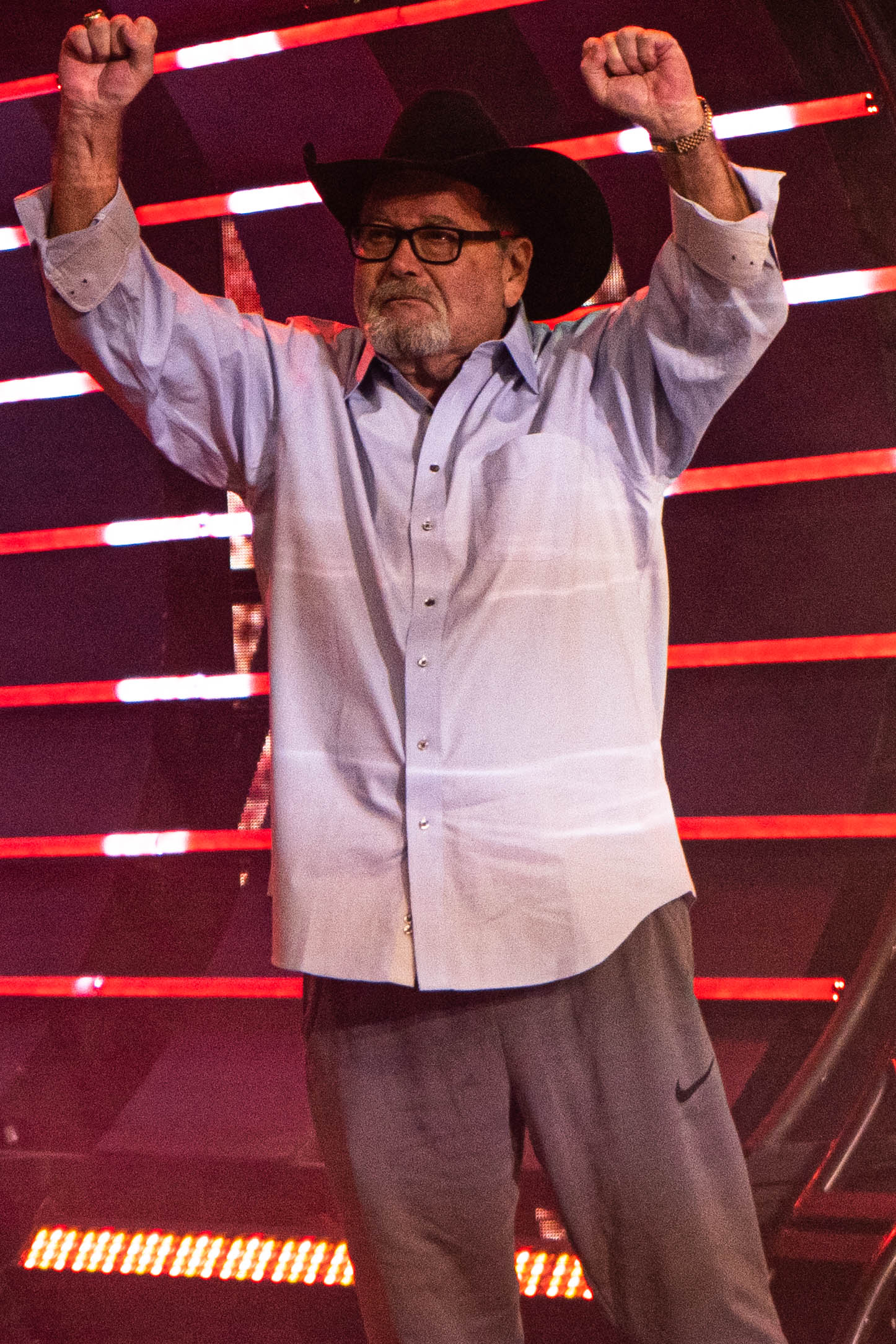
Ross at Forbidden Door in 2022

On April 3, 2019, it was announced that Ross had signed a three-year deal with All Elite Wrestling (AEW) as a commentator and senior advisor. Ross initially provided full-time commentary on the broadcast team on AEW Dynamite and occasionally part-time commentary on AEW Rampage. On the January 5, 2022, episode of Dynamite, Ross returned to TBS for the first time since 1993. In June 2022, Ross switched from full-time commentary on Dynamite to full-time commentary on Rampage in a commentary team rotation swap with Taz.

On June 17, 2023, Ross tweeted an image showing a black eye he had suffered due to a fall, he worked at the debut episode of AEW Collision but later announced that he would be stepping away to heal.

On August 5, 2023, Ross returned to the AEW Collision commentary team, and has since only provided commentary as an analyst for the main events in the second hour of AEW Collision.

Following his further surgery in February 2024, Ross returned on March 3, 2024, for Revolution to commentate Sting's retirement match. In August 2024 he recorded separate sit-down interviews with Bryan Danielson and Swerve Strickland ahead of their match at All In. Later that month he revealed he had broken his wrist although he expected to call the match at All In. On August 25, 2024, Ross commentated during the main event between Danielson and Strickland at All In. He returned on September 7, 2024, for the All Out main event and unsanctioned matches.

After 10 months away due to illness, Ross returned on July 12, 2025, at All In to provide commentary for the last 2 matches of the show.

=== National Football League ===
In 1992, Ross joined the Atlanta Falcons radio broadcast team. However, he would leave after one season, but had a second stint with the Falcons in 1994.

=== Boxing and mixed martial arts ===
Ross made his debut calling boxing on May 26, 2014, for Golden Boy Promotions on Fox Sports 1.

Ross teamed up with MMA fighter and UFC veteran Chael Sonnen to commentate the Battlegrounds MMA one night tournament PPV on October 3, 2014.

=== Podcasting ===
In 2014 Ross began hosting his own podcast The Ross Report for PodcastOne. It was later relaunched as part of the Westwood One podcast network in 2018 as The Jim Ross Report. In April 2019, Ross partnered with wrestling podcaster/mortgage lender Conrad Thompson to revamp his podcast as Grilling JR, with a new format of reminiscences about Ross's history in wrestling, much in the same style as Thompson's podcasts with Bruce Prichard, Eric Bischoff, Tony Schiavone, Kurt Angle, Jeff Jarrett and Arn Anderson.

== In-ring career ==
Although Ross's career has predominantly been as a commentator, Ross has participated in matches, with some notable success, including a victory over Triple H in a no-disqualification match in 2005 (albeit with help from Batista).

Another notable in-ring appearance by Ross was in a tag team match with broadcast partner Jerry "The King" Lawler against Al Snow and Jonathan Coachman at the 2003 Unforgiven pay-per-view, with their Raw broadcast jobs on the line. They lost the contest to Snow and Coachman due to interference by Chris Jericho, however two weeks later Ross and Lawler regained their jobs when Ross defeated Coachman in a Country Whippin' match, using a stunner as a finishing maneuver. Ross has participated in more matches alongside Lawler, including a few with hardcore stipulations. In 2011, Ross competed against Michael Cole on the April 25 episode of Raw, where he defeated Cole by disqualification after Cole's manager for the match, Jack Swagger, attacked Ross while he had Cole mounted and was landing punches on him.

Ross has been involved in numerous other conflicts with other competitors as well such as Triple H, Val Venis, Jack Swagger, Vladimir Kozlov, Mankind, and Steve Austin, Ross has been bloodied in a match by then-Raw General Manager Eric Bischoff, and was even set on fire by Kane. Ross even main-evented the WWF's first-ever show from the Georgia Dome in Atlanta, Georgia, an episode of Raw is War that took place on October 11, 1999. Ross teamed with Steve Austin to take on WWF Champion Triple H and his partner Chyna.

As part of storylines, Ross has been regularly targeted by Vince McMahon in rather harsh circumstances throughout his time with WWE: most notably in 2005 when Vince McMahon's character, Mr. McMahon, featured in a series of segments which made fun of Ross's legitimate colon surgery. This has been seen as form of bullying towards Ross by fans.

In 2011, after his firing as an announcer by John Laurinaitis, he returned to team up with John Cena to face Michael Cole and Alberto Del Rio in a tag team match on Raw in a winning effort.

== Personal life and health issues ==
Ric Flair claims he introduced Ross to his late wife, Jan. Ross writes in his autobiography that Ric Flair was present on an airplane when he first met Jan who was a flight attendant. He has two daughters from two previous marriages and two granddaughters. He cites Steve Austin and Jerry Lawler as his closest friends. Ross lives with Bell's palsy, which sometimes temporarily paralyzes his facial muscles. The symptoms first occurred on January 30, 1994. In late 1998, following the death of his mother, Ross took a break from WWE Raw as the effects of his grief reportedly aggravated his palsy; Michael Cole filled in for him.

In 2007, encouraged by sales of his line of barbecue sauces and beef products, Ross opened up J.R.'s Family Bar-B-Q in Norman, Oklahoma. The restaurant closed in May 2010. Ross is also a fan of Skyline Chili and has mentioned them in connection to Cincinnati numerous times on AEW programming.

Ross is an avid Oklahoma Sooners fan and a regular football season ticket holder. This is reflected in his entrance music, which is "Boomer Sooner" (the Sooners' fight song). He can be spotted at some Sooners home games, and when the Sooners play top teams around the country. In 2014, he became FoxSports.com's Contributor for NCAA Football and Oklahoma Sooners. On the February 23, 2021, episode of his YouTube series Grilling J.R., Ross stated that The Sopranos is his favorite TV show and that he still would occasionally watch it.

On March 21, 2017, Ross's wife Jan was involved in a vehicle accident, suffering serious head injuries. She was put on life support, and she died two days later.

Ross had an eye operation in 2018 that greatly affected his eyesight in one eye.

On October 23, 2021, Ross tweeted that he had skin cancer as he was on his way to AEW Dynamite. On December 29, 2021, Ross tweeted that he was cancer free. On February 1, 2024, Ross once again posted that he had undergone successful cancer surgery on his right hip. On May 15, 2025, Ross announced that he had been diagnosed with colon cancer and was to go into surgery for it "in the next week or two". On May 28, 2025, Ross announced that his colon cancer surgery was a success, and on June 25, Ross revealed he was cancer free.

In January 2026, Ross said he fell at home which caused him to miss AEW Dynamite. "I just tripped going to my chair. Sounds crazy, but I took a hell of a bump. I laid on the floor from nine in the morning till two in the afternoon. No fun whatsoever” Ross said.

In July 2026, Ross said that he recently spent forty days in the hospital after passing out in his home. This led to him announcing that he was suffering memory issues which led to him requiring brain surgery and needing a shunt to drain fluid from his brain to his stomach. “I gotta get it addressed, I couldn’t live my life the way it was, you know. I forget shit and just couldn’t remember things. It’s just horrible. I felt horrible. But that all started with me passing out in my house and being discovered there, and we began an almost 40-day hospital stay” Ross said.On August 12, 2026, Conrad Thompson announced that his brain surgery was a success and would return home soon.However, on August 27, 2026, just fifteen days after his successful brain sugery, Ross again fell at home. Ross said he was fine but now relies on a walker following his surgery. Ross also said he was advised by doctors to cancel a AEW trip to England with doctors warning him that another fall during the flight or in England could create a medical emergency.On October 6, 2026, doctors discovered brain bleeding during a CAT scan which would require more surgery. "Getting another brain surgery Wednesday morning to address an issue with my shunt. Positive thoughts appreciated. Thanks” Ross said.On October 12, 2026, Ross shared to social media that he was yet again back in the hospital due to low oxygen.

== In other media ==
In the film Man on the Moon, Ross played Lance Russell (Memphis weekly wrestling show's lead announcer) announcing the match between Andy Kaufman (played by Jim Carrey) and Jerry "The King" Lawler.

Ross also has a recurring role on the Amazon Prime Video original Paradise City as Ned.

Ross was one of the original lead announcers of the original XFL in spring 2001.

Ross has also provided his voice for many WWE video games, and is also an unlockable character in WWE '12, WWF WrestleMania 2000, WWF No Mercy and many more.

In October 2014, he appeared in "Brian and the Boz", a 30 for 30 documentary on fellow Oklahoman Brian Bosworth. Three years later, he appeared in another 30 for 30 documentary, this time about Ric Flair.

Ross has written two WWF/WWE themed cook books Can You Take The Heat? The WWF Is Cooking and J.R's Cookbook released in 2000 and 2003 respectively. His autobiography Slobberknocker was released on October 3, 2017. The foreword for the new autobiography was written by Vince McMahon. The book includes a letter from McMahon to Ross from when Ross was sick for the second time with Bell's Palsy. Ross's second book and further autobiography Under the Black Hat: My Life in the WWE and Beyond, co-written with Paul O'Brien, was published in March 2020. On May 7, 2024, Ross and O'Brien released a second book, Business Is About to Pick Up!.

Ross has also created a range of J.R.'s BBQ sauces and mustard which have been inspired by his own culinary knowledge and that of his close family.

== Legacy ==
Ross has been labeled as the greatest wrestling commentator of all time. Ryan Dilbert from the Bleacher Report has stated "Ross also brought searing passion and a love of the wrestling business to Mid-South Wrestling, WWE and World Championship Wrestling. To hear a match with Ross on the call was to watch wrestling morph into poetry, for the scripted action to feel real, meaningful and unforgettable. Debating the greatest pro wrestling commentator comes down to two men, Ross and Gordon Solie. As for the greatest in WWE history, there is no debate Ross stands alone".

Professional wrestling booker and promoter and colleague Eric Bischoff has praised and been critical of Ross, stating, "Jim was in upper-management, had a lot of influence, was participating in the booking during WCW's worst days, and he still didn't have management of the company. So I'm not saying he wasn't capable, necessarily. But he certainly didn't have a track record that he could point to and say look, this is what I did over here." Bischoff also further reiterated that Ross "worked very closely with Bill Watts, which is one of the biggest train wrecks in the history of professional wrestling. So it's not like Jim came in with a résumé that would make one think he would be the ideal candidate to run a wrestling company. Jim is the best announcer, probably on planet Earth. Jim had a tremendous amount of experience and had seen a lot, but he'd never done it."

WWE Hall of Famer and Legend Stone Cold Steve Austin has praised Ross stating, "Jim Ross, to me, with his range, with his storytelling, he paid his dues. I mean, he learned from the ground up. And his inflection and his ability to watch a match, tell a story, get the talent over with the credibility that he had, he was the shining diamond on top of everyone, so always a good experience with Jim".

== Awards and accomplishments ==
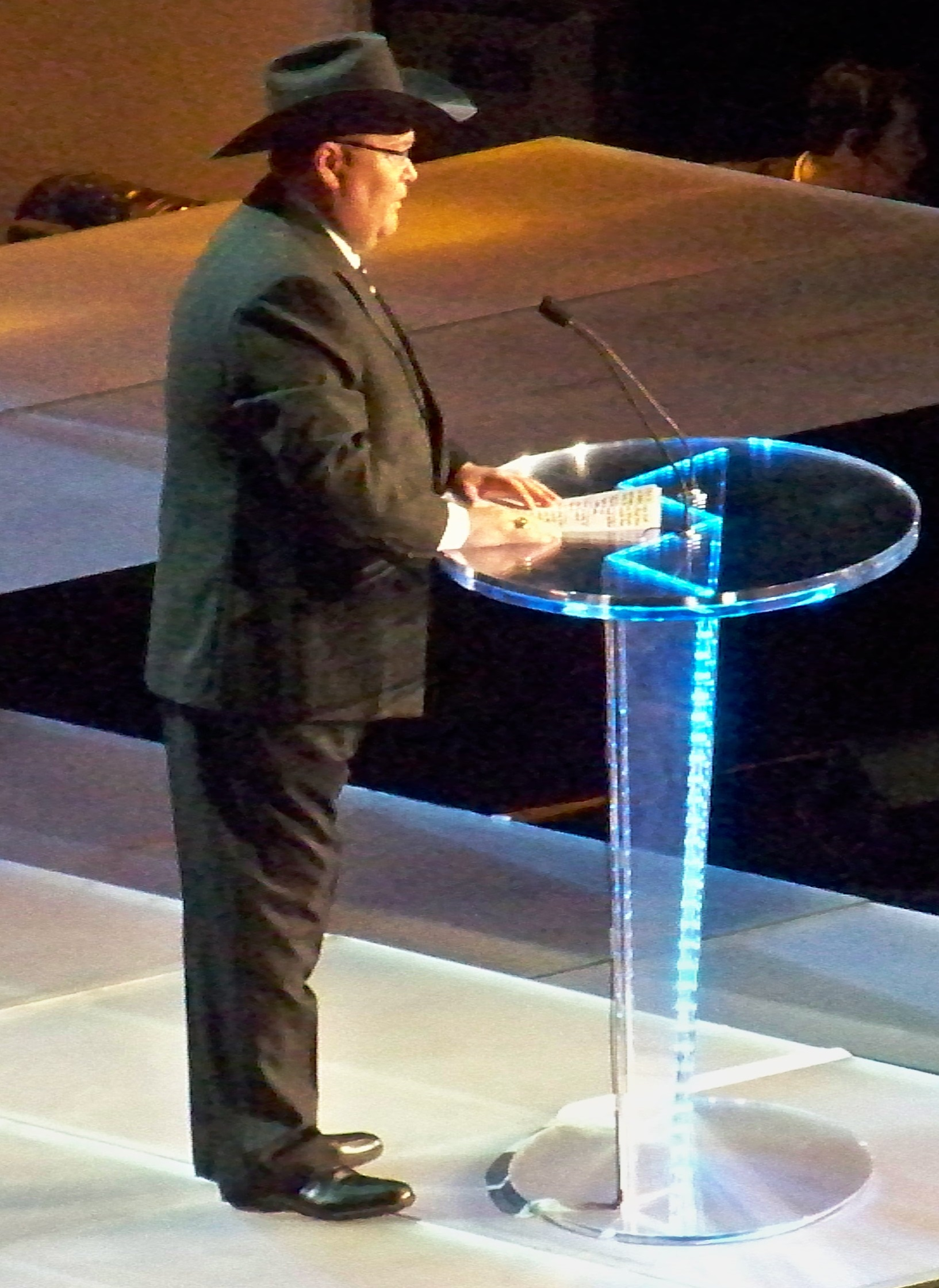
Ross was inducted into the WWE Hall of Fame in 2007

- Cauliflower Alley Club
  - Art Abrams Lifetime Achievement Award (2010)
  - Jim Ross Announcer Award (2024)
- George Tragos/Lou Thesz Professional Wrestling Hall of Fame
  - Lou Thesz Award (2011)
  - Gordon Solie Award (2022)
- National Wrestling Alliance
  - NWA Hall of Fame (Class of 2016)
- Pro Wrestling Illustrated
  - Stanley Weston Award (2002)
- World Wrestling Entertainment/WWE
  - WWE Hall of Fame (Class of 2007)
  - Slammy Award for "Tell Me I Did Not Just See That" Moment of the Year (2011) – Rapping during the "Michael Cole Challenge"
- Wrestling Observer Newsletter
  - Best Television Announcer (1988–1993, 1998–2001, 2006–2007, 2009, 2012)
  - Worst Feud of the Year (2005) vs. McMahon family
  - Wrestling Observer Newsletter Hall of Fame (Class of 1999)

== Bibliography ==
- Slobberknocker: My Life in Wrestling (Sports Publishing, 2017, Hardcover) ISBN 1-68358-113-X, ISBN 978-1683581130
- Under the Black Hat: My Life in the WWE and Beyond (S&S/Simon Element, 2020, Hardcover) ISBN 1-98213-052-0, ISBN 978-1982130527
- Business Is About to Pick Up!: 50 Years of Wrestling in 50 Unforgettable Calls (BenBella Books, 2024, Hardcover) ISBN 1-63774-464-1, ISBN 978-1637744642

Preceded by Vince McMahon	Raw lead announcer 1997–2008	Succeeded by Michael Cole
Preceded by Michael Cole	SmackDown lead announcer 2008–2009	Succeeded by Todd Grisham
Preceded by Inaugural	Dynamite lead announcer 2019–2022	Succeeded by Excalibur
Preceded by Excalibur	Rampage lead announcer 2022–2023	Succeeded by Excalibur
