= List of professional wrestling conventions =

This is a list of professional wrestling conventions.

== History ==
A professional wrestling fan convention typically features a professional wrestling promotion's talent and alumni autograph signings, interviews, fan activities, memorabilia displays, meet-and-greets, and matches. One of the oldest professional wrestling fan convention is Cauliflower Alley Club established in 1965.

== Canada ==
Convention	Years active	Location	Founder(s)	Notes
Great Canadian Wrestling Expo	2005-	Various		
Pro Wrestling Expo	2015-	Various		

== United Kingdom ==
Convention	Years active	Location	Founder(s)	Notes
London Wrestling Convention	2015-	Grange Tower Bridge Hotel		
For The Love of Wrestling	2019-	Exhibition Centre, Liverpool 2019-2022 Bowlers Exhibition Centre, Manchester 2023-	Monopoly Events	
Wrestle Expo UK	2015-	Second City CrossFit		
Wrestling MediaCon	2018-2018	Bowlers Exhibition Centre, Manchester		

== United States ==
Convention	Years active	Location	Founder(s)	Notes
SummerSlam Axxess	2009-2013	Various	Vince McMahon	
Starrcast	2018-	Various	Conrad Thompson	
WrestleCon	2005-	Various	Michael Bochicchio	Held on WrestleMania weekend
WWNLive Supershow Mercury Rising	2010-	Various	WWNLive	Held on WrestleMania weekend
WrestleMania Axxess	1999-	Various	Vince McMahon	
WrestleReunion	2005-2014	Various	Sal Corrente	
Wrestling Fans International Association	1969-1983	Various	Mike Gratchner; Diane Devine; Tom Burke; Don Wilson	

=== East Coast ===
Convention	Years active	Location	Founder(s)	Notes
Baltimore Celebfest	2021-	Baltimore, Maryland	Chad Clark	
The Big Event	2011-	Queens, New York	Brian Barth	
Eddie Gilbert Memorial Brawl	1996-1999	Cherry Hill, New Jersey	Dennis Coraluzzo	Convention and banquet ceremony was held during the weekend of the shows.
Fan Slam Wrestling Convention	2004-	Totowa, New Jersey	Tommy Fierro	
Hardcore Reunion	2009	Allentown, Pennsylvania		
K&S Wrestlefest Wrestling Convention	2004-	Philadelphia, Pennsylvania		
Legends of the Ring	1999-	New Jersey		
Memories, Moments and Mayhem Convention	2013-	Delanson, New York	In Your Face Wrestling	The convention is followed by a live In Your Face Wrestling event.
PWHF Induction Weekend Convention	2005-	Amsterdam, New York		Convention is held at the annual induction ceremony.
River City Wrestling Con	2019-	St. Augustine, FL	New Horizon Entertainment, LLC	River City Wrestling Con began in 2019 as a single day wrestling convention in Jacksonville, FL. Since then, it has turned into a weekend long family-friendly event held at the World Golf Village Renaissance Resort in St. Augustine, FL. The event features more than 100 wrestling stars from yesterday, today and tomorrow and is filled with meet and greets, Q&A panels, and live wrestling matches held throughout the convention weekend.
RSPW Convention	1995	Philadelphia, Pennsylvania	rec.sport.pro-wrestling	The first and only fan organized convention via internet newsgroup. It featured a Q&A session with the ECW roster in addition to a live wrestling event.
Wrestling Spectacular	2012-	Middletown, New York	John Menechino; Lou Sabowski	
WrestleCade Weekend	2012-	Winston-Salem, NC	Tracy Myers, Brian Hawks, George South	WrestleCade Weekend began as a 1-day wrestling convention in 2012 and has turned into 6 family-friendly wrestling events held over the course of 3 days the weekend after Thanksgiving in Winston-Salem, NC. Featuring more than 100 wrestling stars from yesterday, today and tomorrow.
Icons of Wrestling	2016-	Philadelphia, PA	Rob Feinstein, Tim Embler	Held at the ECW Arena prior to House of Hardcore from 2016-2019 and Battleground Championship Wrestling since 2021.

=== Midwest ===
Convention	Years active	Location	Founder(s)	Notes
Wrestle Legends	2018-	Hilliard, Ohio	Matthew Sweeney	First ever pro wrestling fan fest held in Hilliard, OH.
Squared Circle Expo	2021-	Indianapolis, Indiana	Ed & Heather Gonzales, Adolfo & Carrie Dorta	

=== New England ===
Convention	Years active	Location	Founder(s)	Notes
New England Pro Wrestling Hall of Fame and Fanfest	2008-	Providence, Rhode Island	Joseph Bruen	Convention is held at the annual induction ceremony.
Pro Wrestling Icons	2009-	Cromwell, Connecticut	Justin Credible	

=== Southern United States ===
Convention	Years active	Location	Founder(s)	Notes
Atlanta Reunion Pro Wrestling Fanfest	2010-	Atlanta, Georgia		The first-ever pro wrestling convention held in Atlanta.
Mid-Atlantic Wrestling Legends Fanfest	2004-	Charlotte, North Carolina	Greg Price	A special edition of the NWA Fanfest, "Last Battle of Atlanta", was held at the Atlanta Airport Marriott Hotel on August 3–7, 2011.
Superstars of Wrestling Fan Fest Weekend	2013-	Rome, Georgia		
CWF Legends Fanfest	2017-	Tampa, Florida	Barry Rose	
River City Wrestling Con	2019-	St. Augustine, FL		River City Wrestling Con began in 2019 as a single day wrestling convention in Jacksonville, FL. Since then, it has turned into a weekend long family-friendly event held at the World Golf Village Renaissance Resort in St. Augustine, FL. The event features more than 100 wrestling stars from yesterday, today and tomorrow and is filled with meet and greets, Q&A panels, and live wrestling matches held throughout the convention weekend.

=== Southwest United States ===
Convention	Years active	Location	Founder(s)	Notes
Cauliflower Alley Club Wrestling Convention and Banquet	1965-	Las Vegas, Nevada	Mike Mazurki; Art Abrams	
ClickJab Wrestling Fanfest	2014-	Arizona	ClickJab Entertainment	
Legends of Wrestling Fanfest	2009-	Houston, Texas	Booker T	

=== West Coast ===
Convention	Years active	Location	Founder(s)	Notes
Women's Wrestling Convention	1998-	San Diego	David C. Jackson	
Wrestlefest	2009-2014	Newark, California	Kirk White	
