= Xtreme Wrestling Center =

Professional wrestling school in Missouri

- Acronym: XWC
- Founded: 2014
- Style: American Wrestling
- Headquarters: Raytown and Kansas City, Missouri
- Founder(s): David Cattin, Jordan Rogers, and Adam Houck
- Website: prowrestling.training/index.html

The Xtreme Wrestling Center (XWC) is an independent professional wrestling school based in Raytown, a suburb of Kansas City, Missouri. Founded in 2014 by Marine Corps combat veteran Jordan 'Smiley' Rogers and professional wrestlers 'Smooth as Satin' David Cattin and Adam Houck. It is an atypical sports training center that supports wrestling through events in the region.

== Organization ==
The name of XWC was inspired by the Extreme Championship Wrestling. The school teaches Professional Wrestling to aspiring wrestlers in the Midwest primarily in the Kansas City area. Its training programs are for professional wrestlers, managers, and referees. XWC is managed by Jordan Rogers with David Cattin acting as head of professional training sessions. It accepts candidate from the age of 16 after and a physical evaluation. Kansas City was chosen as a location because it has over 100 years of history in professional wrestling and a long-time stronghold for pro wrestling.

== See also ==
- List of professional wrestling conventions
