= Ric Flair's Last Match =

2022 Jim Crockett Promotions pay-per-view event

- Promotional poster featuring Andrade El Idolo, Ric Flair, Jay Lethal, Jeff Jarrett, David Crockett and Karen Jarrett
- Promotion: Jim Crockett Promotions
- Date: July 31, 2022
- City: Nashville, Tennessee, United States
- Venue: Nashville Municipal Auditorium
- Attendance: 6,800
- Buy rate: 24,020–29,020
- Tagline: Walkin' That Aisle – One Last Time

Ric Flair's Last Match was a professional wrestling pay-per-view (PPV) event and supershow. It took place on July 31, 2022, at the Nashville Municipal Auditorium in Nashville, Tennessee and aired live on FITE and In Demand with a pre-show being streamed live on YouTube. The event was produced and promoted by Conrad Thompson and David Crockett under the banner of Jim Crockett Promotions (JCP) as part of the Starrcast V convention, and was the first card promoted under the JCP banner since 1988. Ric Flair headlined the event in the advertised final match of his 50-year career, teaming with his then son-in-law Andrade El Idolo to defeat Jay Lethal and Jeff Jarrett.

Wrestlers from All Elite Wrestling (AEW), Black Label Pro (BLP), DDT Pro-Wrestling (DDT), Future Stars of Wrestling (FSW), Game Changer Wrestling (GCW), Impact Wrestling, Lucha Libre AAA Worldwide (AAA), Major League Wrestling (MLW), National Wrestling Alliance (NWA), New Japan Pro-Wrestling (NJPW), Ohio Valley Wrestling (OVW), Progress Wrestling, Pro Wrestling Revolver (PWR), Ring of Honor (ROH), Terminus: Modern Age Grappling, and World Wrestling Entertainment (WWE) performed during the event. It was the first event to feature cooperation from all major American professional wrestling promotions since the 3rd Annual Brian Pillman Memorial Show in 2000.

The show drew 6,800 fans for a live gate of $448,502, making it the second highest-grossing North American independent professional wrestling event in modern history behind All In.

== Production ==
=== Background ===
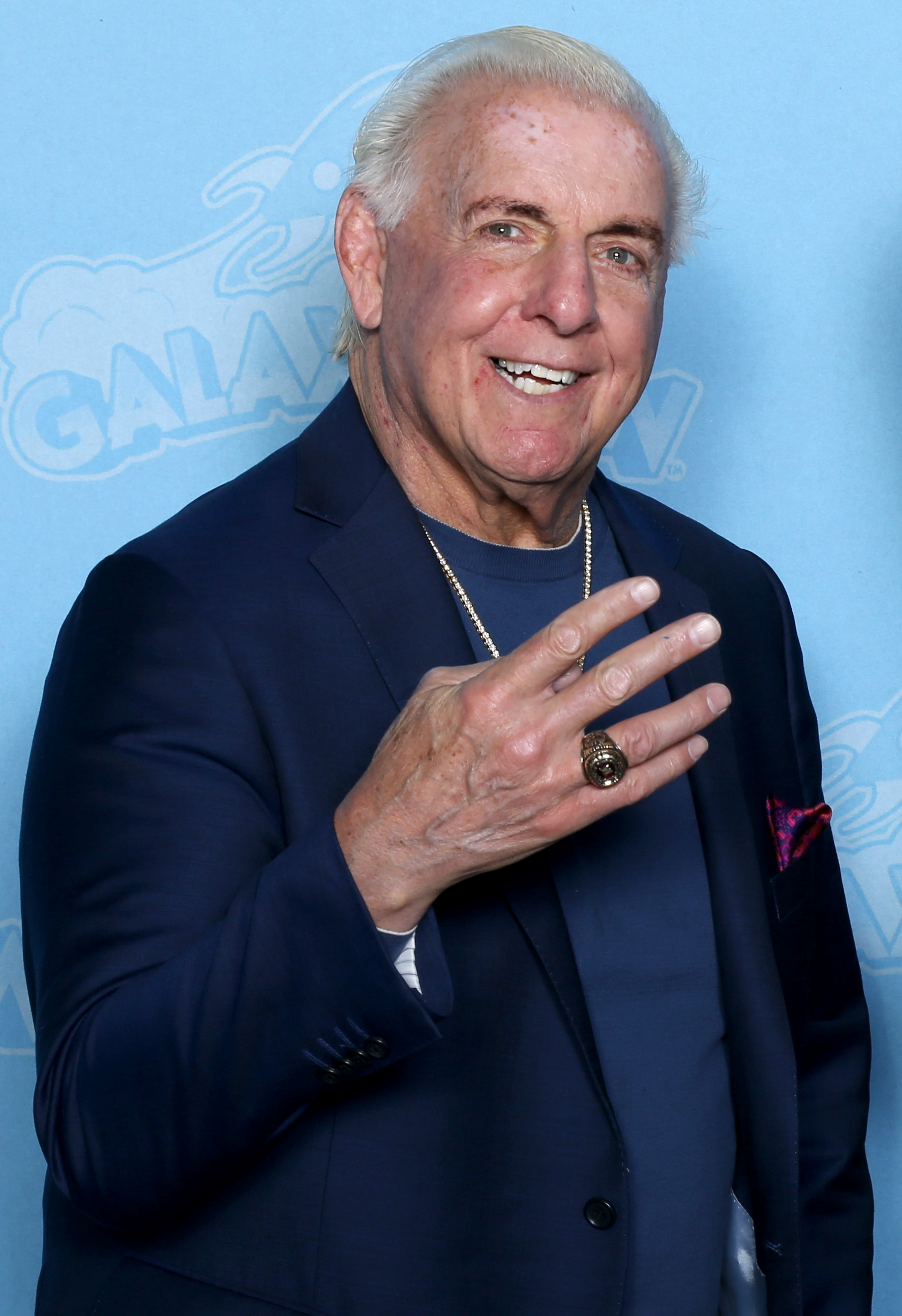
Ric Flair, who headlined the event in the final match of his 50-year career

Ric Flair debuted as a professional wrestler on December 10, 1972. Flair lost his first retirement match against Shawn Michaels at WWE's WrestleMania XXIV in March 2008. He later wrestled on the Hulkamania: Let The Battle Begin tour in 2009 and for Total Nonstop Action Wrestling (TNA) from 2010–2011. Flair has said he only came back to wrestle after the match with Michaels because he was significantly in debt, and regrets having done so.

Footage surfaced of Flair training with former TNA rival Jay Lethal in April 2022. It was then announced in May 2022 that Flair would wrestle one final match at Nashville Fairgrounds on July 31, 2022, as part of his son-in-law Conrad Thompson's Starrcast convention. The convention was held the same weekend as WWE's SummerSlam, which took place at nearby Nissan Stadium on July 30.

The wrestling card, titled Ric Flair's Final Match, was later moved to the larger Nashville Municipal Auditorium on June 20, 2022 due to high demand. Flair previously headlined events at Nashville Municipal Auditorium including WrestleWar '89: Music City Showdown against Ricky Steamboat, and Starrcade '95: World Cup of Wrestling against Randy Savage.

On June 23, 2022, Nashville mayor John Cooper declared July 31 "Ric Flair Day" in honor of the occasion.

Brian James and Scott D'Amore produced and timed the matches. Matches were agented by Bully Ray, Daniel McDevitt, Scott Armstrong, Sinn Bodhi, Tom Prichard and Wolfie D. The broadcast was produced by David Sahadi, Josh Mathews and Keith Mitchell.

=== Storylines ===
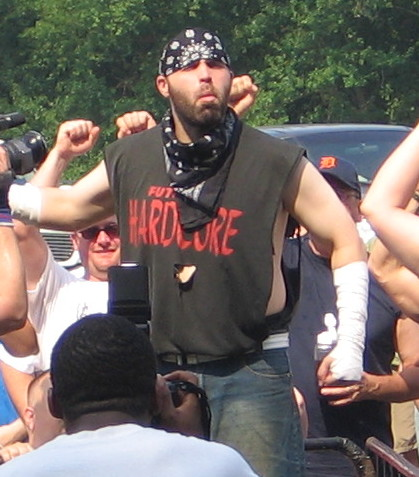
Nick Gage, who promised Conrad Thompson he would lead a GCW invasion

The event included eleven matches that resulted from scripted storylines, in which wrestlers portrayed heroes, villains, or less distinguishable characters in scripted events that built tension and culminated in a wrestling match.

Storylines were produced in a three-part weekly web series titled Ric Flair: The Last Match that aired between July 11, 2022 and July 25, 2022 on the show's official website. Narrated by Darius Rucker, the first episode detailed Flair's battle with alcoholism and subsequent health problems following the death of his son Reid Flair in 2013. The second episode saw Flair get attacked by training partner Jay Lethal and WWE executive Jeff Jarrett outside of Nashville Fairgrounds following the event's press conference on June 23, 2022. Lethal was insulted that Flair could not get him booked on the card, and Jarrett was insulted that Flair disrespected his father, Jerry Jarrett and claiming Jarrett was never an official member of the Four Horsemen. Flair was left bloodied in a parking lot following the attack. It was then announced that Flair would team with son-in-law Andrade El Idolo to face Jarrett and Lethal in the main event. The third and final episode featured a contract signing between the main event teams, brokered by promoter David Crockett.

An angle was filmed during Game Changer Wrestling's The People vs. GCW event at Starrcast on July 29, 2022. Nick Gage told Conrad Thompson that since he did not book any GCW wrestlers for Ric Flair's Final Match, they would have to invade the show.

=== Cancelled matches ===
The originally planned main event was reported to have been Ric Flair teaming with FTR (Cash Wheeler and Dax Harwood) to take on Ricky Steamboat and the Rock 'n' Roll Express (Ricky Morton and Robert Gibson) in a six-man tag team match. Steamboat confirmed that he was offered the match, but turned it down. Matt Cardona proposed defending the NWA Worlds Heavyweight Championship against Flair, but he was injured soon after and forced to forfeit his title. Ren Narita was scheduled to face Clark Connors on the undercard, but Connors was injured and replaced by Yuya Uemura.

== Event ==
Other on-screen personnel
Role:	Name:
English commentators	Tony Schiavone
English commentators	David Crockett
English commentators	Ian Riccaboni (ROH and NJPW)
English commentators	Tom Hannifan (Impact)
English commentators	Scott D'Amore (Impact)
English commentators	Joe Dombrowski (MLW and AAA)
English commentators	Dave Prazak (GCW and MLW)
English commentators	Nick Aldis (NWA)
Spanish commentators	Carlos Cabrera
Spanish commentators	Hugo Savinovich
Ring announcers	Cyrus Fees
Ring announcers	David Penzer (main event)
Referees	Brandon Tolle
Referees	Daniel Spencer
Referees	Dave Harmon
Referees	Dave Miller
Referees	Derek Sabato
Referees	Mike Chioda (main event)
Referees	Mike Posey
Interviewer	Josh Shernoff

=== Pre-show ===
The event's pre-show was broadcast free on YouTube at 6:05pm EDT, a nod to the traditional timeslot JCP's World Championship Wrestling program aired on TBS throughout the 1980s.

In the opening contest of the pre-show, New Japan Pro Wrestling young lions Yuya Uemura and Ren Narita faced each other. Narita took the victory by pinning Uemura with a bridging belly to belly suplex.

Tony Schiavone introduced Ric Flair for an interview segment, but instead Jay Lethal came out with Karen Jarrett to do a Flair impersonation and antagonize the crowd. Jarrett was interrupted by loud "Who are you?" chants from the audience.

Frank the Clown then entered the ring to insult Ric Flair, at which point Jacob Fatu came out. Frank the Clown attempted to escape up the entranceway, but Mick Foley prevented him from leaving and threw him back in the ring to get beatdown by Fatu.

The second contest of the show and final contest of the pre-show saw Game Changer Wrestling (GCW) star Mance Warner win the Bunkhouse Battle Royale by last eliminating Bully Ray. Prior to the match, the announced participants were already in the ring when Nick Gage came out and declared that he had brought a contingent of GCW stars as surprise entrants.

=== Preliminary matches ===
In the opening contest of the pay-per-view broadcast, The Motor City Machine Guns (Alex Shelley and Chris Sabin) took on The Wolves in a tag team match. The Motor City Machine Guns picked up the victory after performing Skull and Bones on Edwards, who was pinned.

The second contest of the pay-per-view saw Davey Boy Smith Jr. take on Killer Kross (with Scarlett Bordeaux) in singles competition, with both men representing Major League Wrestling. Kross hit Smith Jr. with The Quickening and won by pinfall.

The pay-per-view's third contest was a Four Corners Match to determine the #1 contender to the Progress World Championship. The participants were Alan Angels, Jonathan Gresham, Konosuke Takeshita and Nick Wayne. Gresham won by pinfall after performing a bridging O'Connor Roll on Angels.

In the fourth contest of the pay-per-view, Rock 'n' Roll Express (Ricky Morton and Kerry Morton) (with Robert Gibson) took on The Four Horsemen (Brian Pillman Jr. and Brock Anderson) (with Arn Anderson) in a tag team match. The Four Horsemen picked up the victory after Anderson hit Ricky Morton with a Gourdbuster and pinned him.

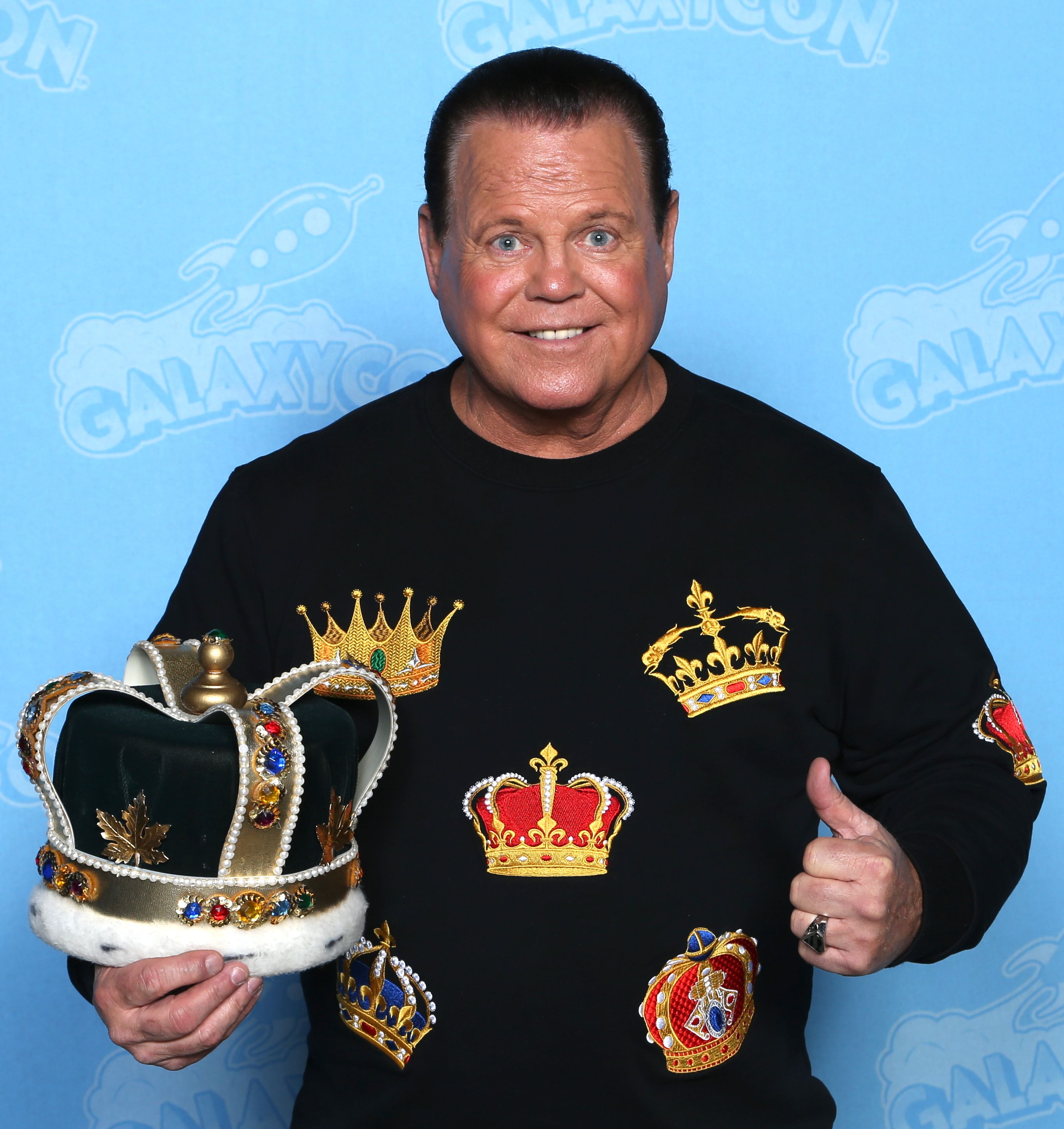
Jerry Lawler, Tennessee wrestling legend who made a surprise appearance in the corner of Jarrett and Lethal

The fifth contest of the pay-per-view was a Four-way match between Bandido, Black Taurus, Laredo Kid and Rey Fénix. This showcase of stars from Lucha Libre AAA Worldwide was won by Fénix after he caught Black Taurus with the Fire Thunder Driver and pinned him.

The pay-per-view's sixth contest saw Impact World Champion Josh Alexander defend his title against Major League Wrestling star Jacob Fatu. The match ended in a no contest after interference by Brian Myers, Matt Cardona and Mark Sterling. Diamond Dallas Page ran in from the crowd to save Alexander from a beatdown, hitting Cardona with a Diamond Cutter.

A backstage segment saw Jerry Jarrett and Jerry Lawler consulting Jeff Jarrett in his locker room regarding the main event, with the group consensus being that Ric Flair stole his strut from Jackie Fargo and that Jeff needed to reclaim it.

In the seventh contest of the pay-per-view, The Von Erichs (Marshall Von Erich and Ross Von Erich) took on The Briscoes (Jay Briscoe and Mark Briscoe) in a tag team match. The Briscoes picked up the victory after Mark hit Ross with a Froggy Bow and pinned him.

The penultimate match of the pay-per-view saw Impact Knockouts World Champion Jordynne Grace defend her title against Deonna Purrazzo and Rachael Ellering in a three-way match. Grace retained her title after tapping out Ellering with a rear naked choke.

=== Main event ===
In the main event, Ric Flair and Andrade El Idolo took on Jay Lethal and Jeff Jarrett (with Karen Jarrett) in a tag team match. The finish came after Conrad Thompson threw brass knuckles to El Idolo. El Idolo then gave the brass knuckles to Flair, who used them to knock out Jarrett. Referee Mike Chioda was knocked out, causing El Idolo to call for another referee from the back. Flair put Jarrett in the figure-four leglock, and with Jarrett's shoulders pinned to the mat, referee Dave Miller counted the pinfall. After the match, Flair greeted his family at ringside along with colleagues in attendance such as Bret Hart, Mick Foley and The Undertaker. Tony Schiavone then interviewed Flair ringside before he made his way up the entrance ramp, stopping to embrace singer Kid Rock and hoist the Big Gold Belt as the broadcast went off the air.

== Reception ==
The production quality and overall presentation of the show was praised. The show drew 6,800 fans for a live gate of $448,502, with an estimated 20,000–25,000 viewers on FITE and 4,200 viewers on In Demand. It was the second highest-grossing North American independent professional wrestling event in modern history behind All In.

Reviews of the show consistently pointed to the four-way between Bandido, Black Taurus, Laredo Kid and Rey Fénix as the best match of the night. Dave Meltzer of Wrestling Observer Newsletter gave that match a 4½-star rating.

Multiple reviewers described watching Flair's performance in the main event as "uncomfortable" due to his poor physical condition. In the leadup to the match, Flair revealed that he had been suffering from plantar fasciitis and planned on drinking prior to the bout. Flair claimed that he passed out twice during the match due to dehydration. His doctor later determined that Flair had in fact passed out after suffering a heart attack.

The main event was voted as the winner of WrestleCrap's Gooker Award for the worst gimmick, storyline, or event in wrestling in 2022. Its induction noted Flair's repeated returns to wrestling after supposed retirement matches (including the aforementioned WrestleMania XXIV loss to Shawn Michaels in 2008, and a match against Sting on TNA Impact! in September 2011), that Flair's unconsciousness caused the match to "[devolve] from uneasy viewing to borderline elder abuse", and that his post-match speech to the crowd made it apparent that he "didn’t even remember half the match he just wrestled". Flair's regret of calling Ric Flair's Last Match his "last match" was also noted, arguing that it "wouldn't have garnered 1/10 the attendance, pay-per-view buys, or merch sales without that promise", and was "like [Michael Jackson] and Lionel Richie watching 'We Are the World' go 4× platinum and wishing they hadn't pledged the money to charity. Or like seeing a great turnout at your own funeral, jumping out of the casket, and saying, 'Hey, let’s do this again next year!'".

== Aftermath ==
Possible follow-up events have been rumored. During the Foley Is Pod panel at Starrcast, Conrad Thompson and Mick Foley discussed the idea of Mick Foley's Last Match. Booker T confirmed that he was approached by Thompson to take part in Harlem Heat's Last Match, but turned it down. Diamond Dallas Page also confirmed that he turned down an offer from Thompson. Starrcast filed to trademark Southwest Championship Wrestling on August 5, 2022, and SuperClash on September 7, 2022.

Mance Warner was awarded a non-title match against interim AEW World Champion Jon Moxley after his Bunkhouse Battle Royale win, with the stipulation that Warner would earn a future title shot if victorious. Moxley defeated Warner on the August 5, 2022 episode of AEW Rampage.

Before the match in July 2022, Flair had vowed to honor his word and never wrestle again, but said he would continue in the business as a manager. A few days after the bout however, he regretted announcing that it would be his final match. During a September 2022 celebration for the 50th anniversary of his debut in professional wrestling, Flair announced that he would never retire. In January 2023 however he stated that he did not want to wrestle again aside from wanting to redo the Last Match. In January 2024, Flair stated "no return to the ring ever".

== Results ==
No.	Results	Stipulations	Times
1^{P}	Ren Narita defeated Yuya Uemura by pinfall	Singles match	5:30
2^{P}	Mance Warner won by last eliminating Bully Ray (Note: Order of elimination from first eliminated: Kal Herro, Big Damo, Crimson, Gringo Loco, Komander, Wolfie D, Sinn Bodhi, Effy, Matthew Justice, 1 Called Manders, Jordan Oliver, Rickey Shane Page, Blake Christian, Joey Janela, James Storm, and Bully Ray.)	Bunkhouse Battle Royale	11:10
3	The Motor City Machine Guns (Alex Shelley and Chris Sabin) defeated The Wolves (Davey Richards and Eddie Edwards) by pinfall	Tag team match	10:50
4	Killer Kross (with Scarlett Bordeaux) defeated Davey Boy Smith Jr. by pinfall	Singles match	5:20
5	Jonathan Gresham defeated Alan Angels, Konosuke Takeshita, and Nick Wayne by pinfall	Four Corners match to determine the #1 contender to the Progress World Championship	5:10
6	The Four Horsemen (Brian Pillman Jr. and Brock Anderson) (with Arn Anderson) defeated Rock 'n' Roll Express (Ricky Morton and Kerry Morton) (with Robert Gibson) by pinfall	Tag team match	7:40
7	Rey Fénix defeated Bandido, Laredo Kid, and Black Taurus by pinfall	Four-way match	11:50
8	Josh Alexander (c) vs. Jacob Fatu ended in no contest	Singles match for the Impact World Championship	10:30
9	The Briscoes (Jay Briscoe and Mark Briscoe) defeated The Von Erichs (Marshall Von Erich and Ross Von Erich) by pinfall	Tag team match	7:45
10	Jordynne Grace (c) defeated Deonna Purrazzo and Rachael Ellering by submission	Three-way match for the Impact Knockouts World Championship	9:05
11	Ric Flair and Andrade El Ídolo defeated Jay Lethal and Jeff Jarrett (with Karen Jarrett) by pinfall	Tag team match	27:00
(c) / – the champion(s) heading into the match; P / – the match was broadcast on the pre-show
