= Seven Seas Marine Life Park =

Former marine mammal park and animal theme park in Arlington, Texas

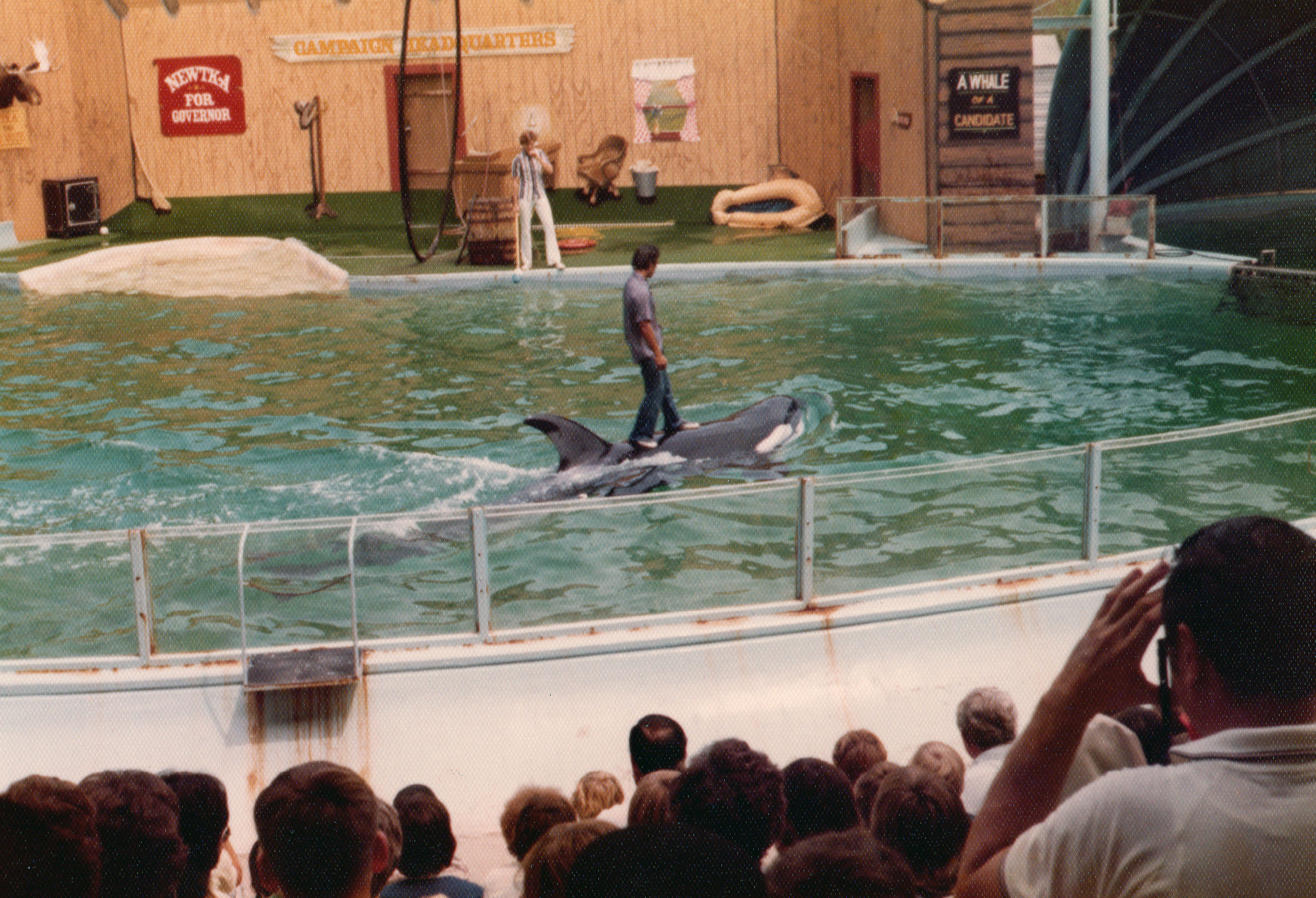
- Newtka giving a ride during a show in the mid 1970s
- Interactive map of Seven Seas Marine Life Park
- Location: Arlington, Texas, U.S.
- Coordinates: 32.7566748°N 97.0817185°W
- Status: Defunct
- Opened: March 18, 1972; 54 years ago
- Closed: 1976; 50 years ago
- Area: 35 acres (14 ha)

Attractions
- Total: 1
- Roller coasters: 0

Seven Seas Marine Life Park was a marine mammal park built and owned by the city of Arlington, Texas, United States. It opened in March 1972, but closed in 1976 after losing millions of dollars.

== History ==
Plans to build the park were made as early as 1971, with costs estimating around $6.7 million. In April 1971, a landscaping project proposal passed, funding a local landscaping company $7,702 to provide 195,000 square feet of Bermuda grass for the park, and $3,121 to prune 1,000 trees growing there. It was 70% complete in early April.

During construction in 1970, several marine life fossils aged at around 100 million years were found at the site.

The park opened on March 18, 1972. The 35 acres (14 ha) site was located in north Arlington off Interstate 30 near Six Flags Over Texas and adjacent to Arlington Stadium.

The park lost almost half a million dollars in 1972, 1973 and 1974 and after the 1975 season, the animals were sold. The park reopened for the 1976 season as Hawaii Kai. The attendance for that season was at an all-time low and the city council of Arlington voted to close the park because it did not generate enough revenue to both pay its operating expenses and pay off the bonded indebtedness.

The Sheraton CentrePark Hotel (later the Sheraton Arlington Hotel) opened on the site in 1985. Remnants of the park remained around the hotel's pool. The hotel will close in February 2026 for demolition and replacement by a Loews Hotel.

== Notable animals ==
- Newtka (also spelled Nootka) the killer whale: A 6,000-pound (2,700 kg) and 18-foot (5.5 m) female orca that resided in the park's largest animal performance stadium. This arena went by many names including Indian Ocean Pool, Killer Whale Stadium, and 7-Eleven Killer Whale Stadium. Trained by Larry Lawrence, Newtka lived in the park during all four years of operation and was considered the main attraction. After the 1975 season she was sold for $125,000 to Marineland and Game Farm Canada, joining their other orca Kandu.
- Dolphin Show: Twelve bottlenose dolphins resided at the park during its four years of operation.
- Pancho the elephant seal: The 2,500-pound (1,100 kg) male was so popular that he received five write-in votes during the 1973 mayoral race against Tom Vandergriff.
- Sea Lion Circus: Over fourteen California sea lions lived and performed within the park, rotating between the shows and the feeding pools.
- Penguin Troop: Many of the birds were rockhopper penguins with the exception of one Magellanic penguin.

== Rides and attractions ==
- Arctic Ride – Dark Ride through Antarctica
- Beacon of the Seven Seas
- Bona Venture
- Koi Fish Pond
- Pearl Diving
