= Sheraton Arlington Hotel =

- Interactive map of the Sheraton Arlington Hotel area

General information
- Type: Hotel
- Architectural style: Modern
- Location: Arlington, Texas; United States, 1500 Convention Center Drive
- Coordinates: 32°45′24.8688″N 97°4′54.426″W
- Completed: 1984
- Closed: February 15, 2026
- Demolished: June 6, 2026
- Owner: Sheraton Hotels and Resorts (1984–2014); Urbana Varro Hospitality Management Company LLC (2014–2023); Loews Hotels (2023–2026)
- Operator: Urbana Varro Hospitality Management Company LLC (2014–2026)

Technical details
- Floor count: 19

The Sheraton Arlington Hotel was a 311-room Sheraton hotel located in Arlington, Texas owned by Loews Hotels. Opened in 1984, the hotel was built on the site of the former Seven Seas Marine Life Park and was connected to the Arlington Expo Center (now known as Esports Stadium Arlington). The building contains 26,000 square feet of event space. The hotel has hosted various events including the professional wrestling fan convention Starrcast from July 11–12, 2025 during the weekend for All Elite Wrestling's (AEW) All In pay-per-view.

On August 14, 2023, Loews Hotels acquired the hotel for an undisclosed amount. On March 1, 2024, the Arlington Economic Development Corporation announced plans to redevelop the hotel under a public-private partnership with the Loews Corporation, a New York City-based conglomerate that primarily specializes in real estate. On December 4, 2025, the Urbana Varro Hospitality Management Company filed a notice to the Texas Workforce Commission under the WARN Act that the hotel would close on February 15, 2026 and that the company would lay off its 116 employees. In January 2026, Loews said that they would redevelop the site to build a luxury hotel called the "Americana" hotel on the site which would cost $550 million and would feature more than 83,000 square feet of event space, 507 rooms, and 39 guest suites. The hotel was imploded ahead of the 2026 FIFA World Cup on June 6, 2026 at 8:15 AM to make way for The Americana which is expected to be opened in between late 2028 to early 2029.
