= Bruce Prichard =

American professional wrestling executive and podcaster

- Born: March 7, 1963 (age 63); El Paso, Texas, U.S.
- Occupation: Professional wrestling executive
- Years active: 1973–present
- Organization(s): Houston Wrestling (1973–1987); World Wrestling Federation/WWE (1987–1991, 1992–2008, 2018–present); Global Wrestling Federation (1991–1992); Total Nonstop Action Wrestling/Impact Wrestling (2010–2014, 2017); Major League Wrestling (2018)
- Title: Executive Director - CWT
- Spouse: Stephanie Prichard (m. 1996)
- Children: 2
- Relatives: Tom Prichard (brother)
- Family: Prichard
- Professional wrestling career
- Ring name(s): Brother Love; Bruce Prichard; Jucie Brucie; Bruce Prickhard; Reo Rodgers; The Wizard
- Billed height: 6 ft 1 in (185 cm)
- Billed weight: 254 lb (115 kg)
- Billed from: El Paso, Texas
- Trained by: Tom Prichard

YouTube information
- Channel: Something To Wrestle With Bruce Prichard
- Years active: 2017–present
- Genre: Professional wrestling
- Subscribers: 134 thousand
- Views: 55.4 million
- Last updated: January 11, 2026

Bruce Prichard (born March 7, 1963) is an American professional wrestling executive, booker, and producer and a former manager, commentator, and occasional professional wrestler who works for WWE as Executive Director - CWT. In addition to his corporate roles with WWE, Prichard has also appeared as an on-screen character under the ring name Brother Love. As Brother Love, Prichard was the original manager of The Undertaker, and hosted a talk show segment, The Brother Love Show.

Prichard has also previously worked for Houston Wrestling, the Global Wrestling Federation, Total Nonstop Action Wrestling, and Major League Wrestling. Since 2016, Prichard has co-hosted the Something to Wrestle with Bruce Prichard podcast with Conrad Thompson.

== Professional wrestling career ==
=== Houston Wrestling (1973–1987) ===
Prichard began his career in 1973 working for Paul Boesch's Houston Wrestling promotion out of Houston, Texas. At 10 years old, he sold posters at the Sam Houston Coliseum with great success. He worked as assistant director of television at age 12 and acted as a ring announcer at age 14. Due to Boesch's working relationship with Bill Watts' Universal Wrestling Federation in the 1980s, Prichard would also act as ring announcer for some UWF shows. As Houston Wrestling became defunct in 1987, Prichard was hired by the World Wrestling Federation.

=== World Wrestling Federation (1987–1991) ===
==== Early years (1987–1988) ====
After entering the World Wrestling Federation in 1987 shortly after WrestleMania III, he first occasionally worked as an announcer for the WWF's television programs alongside Mike McGuirk and "The Duke of Dorchester" Pete Doherty and occasionally Bobby "The Brain" Heenan, before creating the Brother Love character.

==== The Brother Love Show (1988–1991) ====
In June 1988, Prichard debuted as "Brother Love", a red-faced, smarmy, dishonest, effusive and boisterous "preacher" character, dressed in a conspicuous white suit, tight red shirt and white tie, who claimed to preach not the word of God, but "the word of love." He was best known for his disingenuous catchphrase "I love you!", during which he would enunciate each word with exaggerated prolongations in a thick Southern accent. The character was inspired by controversial televangelists of the time, with Prichard specifically citing Robert Tilton as his most direct inspiration; despite this claim, it is acknowledged that the peak of Tilton's fame was in the early 1990s. However, shortly after the character debuted, similarities were also noted between Brother Love and controversial pastor Jimmy Swaggart's style of preaching. Swaggart was also referred to at times as "Brother Swaggart." Though Prichard has credited Tilton as the main inspiration for the Brother Love character, he has also credited Swaggart, Jim Bakker and even Oral Roberts as inspirations for the character as well. Months before Brother Love debuted, Swaggart and Bakker were involved in controversial scandals which tarnished their public images and resulted in networks cancelling their television shows.

In a 2016 podcast with Stone Cold Steve Austin, Prichard recalled that he had long been a fan of evangelist preachers, more for their theatrics than their religion. When Prichard first pitched the idea of Brother Love to WWF owner Vince McMahon, Vince generally liked the idea but did not believe that Prichard "had the face" for the role. Determined to get himself into the role that he had created, Prichard, dressed as Brother Love (minus the red face paint he would appear on television with), invaded a meeting at the WWF's headquarters between McMahon, the head of WWF International and the WWF's chief financial officer. While there, he gave an impromptu two minute sermon before quickly departing. When he arrived back at his office at the WWF's television studios five minutes later, he discovered that he had two missed calls from McMahon who he was relieved to find had liked what he had seen. However, Vince wanted to see how it worked on camera. Thus, the Brother Love character became a reality. Prichard also told that the bright red face make up was unknown to him the first time he appeared on television as Brother Love. As it was a television taping, Prichard thought it was just normal make up being applied and he did not look in the mirror, not knowing that Vince McMahon had ordered that he be given the red face.

Introduced to the WWF by Bobby "The Brain" Heenan, Love hosted a segment on the World Wrestling Federation's syndicated and cable television programs called "The Brother Love Show", in which he would interview wrestlers. The segment debuted on the June 19, 1988 airing of WWF Wrestling Challenge, and moved to WWF Superstars of Wrestling on October 8, 1988. The segment was patterned largely after Piper's Pit: Brother Love would berate face wrestlers (especially Hulk Hogan and Ultimate Warrior) and openly support such heels as Ted DiBiase and Bobby Heenan. It was explained that DiBiase was Brother Love's main "benefactor". More than once, a wrestling feud was set up because of what occurred on "The Brother Love Show" (including Hulk Hogan's feuds against Big Boss Man (1988–1989) and Earthquake (1990), and the Jake Roberts-Rick Martel feud from late 1990 to early 1991). The Brother Love Show was also the setting for the unveiling of Ted DiBiase's Million Dollar Championship and Rick Martel's "Arrogance" cologne.

Brother Love made his pay-per-view debut at SummerSlam 1988 when he interviewed face wrestler "Hacksaw" Jim Duggan. He later featured prominently in WrestleMania V in 1989, when he took over Rowdy Roddy Piper's Piper's Pit and was promptly "de-skirted" by Piper. A year later, Sgt. Slaughter bestowed a medal upon Brother Love during SummerSlam for being the "greatest American".

Occasionally, Brother Love provided color commentary for the WWF's televised events; unlike during his early WWF run under his real name and using his natural voice (as Prichard), where he was pro face, Brother Love was pro heel. His most famous assignment was alongside Sean Mooney for the WWF's televised event at Madison Square Garden on January 21, 1991, where he was roughed up by Ultimate Warrior on his way to the ring to face "Macho Man" Randy Savage in a steel cage just two days after Savage had caused the Warrior to lose the WWF World Heavyweight Championship to Sgt. Slaughter at the Royal Rumble.

==== Manager of The Undertaker (1990–1991) ====
On November 19, 1990, Brother Love began managing The Undertaker (who at the time was known as "Kane the Undertaker", the add-on of "Kane" inspired by Prichard). The November 19 appearance was The Undertaker's debut into the company and later used as an episode of WWF Superstars of Wrestling, which did not air on television until after his on-screen debut at the 1990 Survivor Series. On November 20, The Undertaker had another off-air match that would later air as part of an episode of WWF Wrestling Challenge, also aired on television after his appearance live at the Survivor Series. At the Survivor Series, The Undertaker performed in a Survivor Series-style elimination tag match on a team led by Ted DiBiase against a team led by Dusty Rhodes. It was at this event that DiBiase would reveal his mystery partner as The Undertaker. This was the first time Brother Love appeared on television as The Undertaker's manager. Brother Love continued to manage The Undertaker until January 28, 1991 (shown on TV in February) when he sold his contract to Paul Bearer.

==== Controversy and release (1991) ====
The character of Brother Love was considered controversial by some given its apparent roots in religion and televangelism. It was introduced around the time of notable scandals involving such televangelists as Jim Bakker and Jimmy Swaggart. Occasionally, segments involving the Brother Love character would lean further into these religious roots and would engender negative reactions from some audience members. One such segment involved Brother Love playing the part of a charlatan "faith healer," during which he was portrayed as having healed an actor pretending to be blind and crippled to again be able to see and walk.

The Brother Love character was retired from the WWF in March 1991 after being attacked and beaten by Ultimate Warrior, who also destroyed The Brother Love Show set. The actual reason for this change was Prichard being offered the choice of continuing to work on-screen as Brother Love, or working solely in a production role.

While the company did receive some complaints regarding the Brother Love character, Prichard's release from the WWF was due to personal and private issues he had at the time. He would be re-hired by the WWF the following year in a resumption of his production role.

=== Global Wrestling Federation (1991–1992) ===
After his release from the WWF, Prichard moved home to Texas where he joined the Dallas-based Global Wrestling Federation, where he worked as a manager and ringside interviewer between 1991 and 1992, using his real name. He began as a babyface color commentator, but eventually turned heel right in the middle of calling an ESPN televised match with GWF play-by-play announcer Craig Johnson. He managed Barry Horowitz in the GWF, and gave him the nickname "The Winner". Horowitz and Prichard feuded with GWF Light Heavyweight champion Chaz Taylor. Prichard said mockingly of Taylor, "He may be a lightweight but he's no champion!" After failing to win the title from Taylor, both Horowitz and Prichard left the GWF.

=== Return to the World Wrestling Federation/World Wrestling Entertainment (1992–2008) ===
Prichard returned to the WWF in August 1992 and portrayed two short-lived characters. He first appeared as "The Wizard", a heel color commentator on All-American Wrestling (who never appeared on camera during the character's brief run), and then as "Reo Rodgers", a satire on Dusty Rhodes. Rodgers did commentary from time to time in his short stint, and his interview segment, "Reo's Roundup", lasted only two segments before the character was dropped. After this, he remained behind the scenes, working as Vince McMahon's "right-hand man" and also as a writer for some of WWE's shows. However, Prichard has reprised his Brother Love character on occasion. Brother Love returned to the WWF in November 1995. He hosted the Brother Love Show once again, this time on Monday Night Raw. In what would prove to be a monumental moment in WWF history, Brother Love hosted Ted DiBiase introducing The Ringmaster into the World Wrestling Federation. The Ringmaster would eventually transform into Stone Cold Steve Austin. Brother Love then quietly disappeared from the WWF again soon after. Brother Love resurfaced once again for one night in January 1997, making a surprise appearance on the debut episode of Shotgun Saturday Night, helping the Flying Nuns defeat The Godwinns. Love then named the team The Sisters of Love. The gimmick was quickly scrapped, with the team later finding success as The Headbangers.

Prichard (as himself) once again managed The Undertaker for a match in Michinoku Pro Wrestling (MPW) on October 10, 1997, where he defeated Jinsei Shinzaki. Through the remainder of the Attitude Era, Prichard was occasionally seen on-screen as himself, either cleaning up between matches at ringside, or as one of the people called in to break up a backstage fight. During the fall of 1998 and into early-1999, he provided colour-commentary on Shotgun Saturday Night. He was also the only backstage employee to have an interview segment on the Raw is Owen memorial broadcast. In 2001, Brother Love participated in the gimmick battle royal at WrestleMania X-Seven. He was eliminated by Sgt. Slaughter. On the February 6, 2003 airing of SmackDown!, Brother Love confronted The Undertaker, then portraying a biker gimmick, in his feud against The Big Show. Brother Love pleaded with The Undertaker to forgive Big Show for his recent actions, but The Undertaker, however, was not pleased and gave Brother Love a chokeslam, followed up by a Tombstone Piledriver in the middle of the ring. Love later appeared in the Bar Room Brawl at Vengeance 2003, lasting all the way to the end before being knocked out by Bradshaw.

The Brother Love Show made a short-term return on a couple of SmackDown! brand house shows in the summer of 2003 as a replacement for planned Piper's Pit segments (Roddy Piper had been released from his contract). These segments saw Love and Mr. McMahon attempt to humiliate Zach Gowen, only to get their comeuppance in the end.

On December 1, 2008, Bruce Prichard was released from WWE by Stephanie McMahon.

=== Total Nonstop Action Wrestling (2010–2013, 2017) ===
It was reported on October 7, 2010, that Prichard had been hired by TNA to presumably reprise the role he had in WWE working as a backstage agent and producer. On October 6, 2011, Prichard took over the role of TNA head writer from Vince Russo. In May 2012, Prichard was promoted to Vice President of Talent Relations to replace Terry Taylor. On October 17, 2012, Prichard was promoted to Senior Vice President, Programming & Talent Relations. In this new role, Prichard oversaw talent relations, talent scouting and development as well as the creative direction of the company. In May 2013, Prichard began appearing as a judge alongside Al Snow and Taz in the monthly Gut Check segment on TNA Impact. TNA released Prichard on July 17, 2013.

In March 2017, it was announced that Prichard would be making his return to Total Nonstop Action Wrestling. Shortly after re-signing with the company, Prichard began appearing in an onscreen role for the recently renamed Impact Wrestling. Prichard left the company in August 2017. To explain Prichard's departure on screen, the story saw Jim Cornette brought in by Anthem, the parent company of Impact Wrestling, to fire him.

=== Major League Wrestling (2018) ===
On March 8, 2018, it was announced that Prichard had been hired as a senior producer by Major League Wrestling, a wrestling promotion founded by former WWE writer, Court Bauer, in 2002.

=== Second return to WWE (2018–present) ===
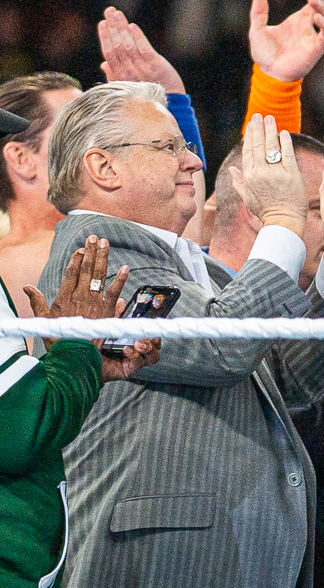
Prichard celebrates Cody Rhodes' victory at WrestleMania XL.

On January 22, 2018, Prichard returned to the WWE for a one-off appearance as Brother Love on the WWE Raw 25 Years anniversary special. In April 2018, Prichard and podcast co-host Conrad Thompson began doing a video version of their podcast titled Something Else to Wrestle, airing exclusively on the WWE Network.

On February 23, 2019, it was reported that WWE had officially signed Prichard on to join their creative team. In March, it was reported that Prichard would be working as WWE's Senior Vice President. On October 15, 2019, it was announced that he would take over as Executive Director of SmackDown, assuming the role from Eric Bischoff. On June 11, 2020, it was reported that after Paul Heyman had been removed from the executive director position of Raw, Prichard would lead both the Raw and Smackdown writing teams into one group as executive director of both shows. Prichard made a cameo appearance as Brother Love at the 2020 Money in the Bank pay-per-view, during the title ladder match.

In 2020, Prichard was described by PWInsider.com as the most powerful person in WWE other than a McMahon family member. Creatively, everything flowed through Prichard and his word had been described as "very much the Gospel" for Vince McMahon.

In November 2024, it was reported that Prichard was on temporary leave from WWE citing a family emergency, despite rumours that he was no longer employed by WWE. It was confirmed by Conrad Thompson, co-host of Something to Wrestle with Bruce Prichard, that he was indeed still working with the company.

In 2025, he would appear in the documentary film Wrestlemania IX: The Spectacle. The documentary was released on Peacock on April 11, 2025.

== Something to Wrestle with Bruce Prichard ==
In August 2016, Prichard and co-host Conrad Thompson began the internet podcast Something to Wrestle with Bruce Prichard. Prichard and Thompson discuss a wide variety of subjects from Prichard's time with the World Wrestling Federation/Entertainment and his time in TNA and the GWF have been topics as well. The show has spun-off into a companion video show, titled Something Else to Wrestle with Bruce Prichard, which debuted on the WWE Network on April 18, 2018.

== Personal life ==
Bruce Prichard is the brother of professional wrestler Tom Prichard and guitarist Chris Prichard. Bruce also has two other brothers, Jerry and Ken. Ken died in February 2022. He has a son, Kane, whom he named after the professional wrestler, and a daughter Amber.

Prichard suffered two heart attacks in 2012.
