= Conrad Thompson =

American mortgage broker and podcast host (born 1981)

- Born: June 27, 1981 (age 45); Guntersville, Alabama, U.S.
- Organization: Save With Conrad
- Title: Founder of Save With Conrad; Founder of Starrcast
- Spouse: Megan Fliehr (m. 2018)
- Relatives: Ric Flair (father in-law); Charlotte Flair (sister in-law); David Flair (brother in-law); Reid Flair (brother in-law)

Conrad Channing Thompson (born June 27, 1981) is an American mortgage broker, professional wrestling promoter, commentator, and podcast host who presents and co-hosts numerous wrestling oriented podcasts, and promotes the Starrcast wrestling convention. He also serves as a color commentator for the independent professional wrestling promotion 1 Fall Wrestling.

== Podcasting ==
=== Beginnings ===
Thompson's interest in podcasting began after meeting ECW wrestler Shane Douglas, whom Thompson met after pledging a significant amount of money to a crowdfunding drive for a documentary about ECW. After a positive experience with Douglas, Thompson later approached wrestling manager Jim Cornette with an offer of $1,500 in exchange to come to his house and tell stories for a couple of hours. Before long, word spread, and with Douglas and Cornette vouching for him, numerous wrestling personalities agreed to meet and be interviewed by Thompson.

=== Ric Flair and Wooooo! Nation ===
In 2013, Thompson met Ric Flair while he was appearing at a local event. Flair and Thompson hit it off, exchanged contact information and became friends. This led to Thompson occasionally travelling with Flair, meeting yet more wrestling personalities backstage at wrestling events. When CBS approached Flair about starting his own podcast, Flair asked Thompson, who had radio experience advertising his mortgage business, to co-host. Flair's show, called Wooooo! Nation, followed a guest-driven format, and Thompson met many professional wrestling personalities during this time, including Bruce Prichard. Eventually, Flair tired of podcasting, and Prichard agreed to launch a new show with Thompson.

=== Something to Wrestle with Bruce Prichard ===
Something to Wrestle eschews a more traditional podcast format, which Thompson describes as, "Be under an hour, don't curse, don't play music, don't play all your ads up front." Thompson calls these, "the standard rules of podcasting" and routinely disregards them on the show, explaining that, "I'm just a fan. But I also am the target demographic. If it's not something I'd listen to or be into, I don't do it." Typically the show revolves around a particular wrestling event or timeline such as a pay-per-view, memorable storyline angle or a wrestler's run in a certain promotion, with Thompson asking questions and Prichard giving his view on the subject. In 2018, Thompson and Prichard signed a deal with WWE to broadcast Something else to Wrestle with Bruce Prichard on the WWE Network.

== Starrcast ==
Starrcast is a professional wrestling fan convention promoted by Thompson. The event typically runs for four days – from Thursday to Sunday – and features wrestlers, wrestling personalities and podcast hosts, interviews, fan activities, and meet-and-greets.

On July 31, 2022 as part of Starrcast V, Thompson - under the Jim Crockett Promotions banner - promoted his first ever wrestling card with Ric Flair's Last Match, featuring his father-in-law wrestling in his final professional wrestling match.

== Personal life ==
Thompson resides in Huntsville, Alabama, where he still operates his mortgage company. He married Megan Fliehr in 2018, becoming an in-law to Ric Flair and his children Ashley (Charlotte Flair) and David.

== Awards and accomplishments ==
- George Tragos/Lou Thesz Professional Wrestling Hall of Fame
  - Gordon Solie Award (2023)
