= AEW Rebel Heart =

Professional wrestling television special

Rebel Heart
- Promotional poster featuring various wrestlers
- Promotion(s): All Elite Wrestling; 1 Fall Wrestling
- Date: September 9, 2026
- City: Athens, Georgia
- Venue: Akins Ford Arena
- Attendance: 2,483

All Elite Wrestling special events chronology
← Previous; CMLL vs. AEW	Next → A Tribute to Pac

1 Fall Wrestling events chronology
← Previous; SummerStage 2	Next → Strange Duck Showdown

Rebel Heart was a professional wrestling television special co-produced by All Elite Wrestling (AEW) and 1 Fall Wrestling (1FW). The event took place on September 9, 2026 at the Akins Ford Arena in Athens, Georgia. The event aired live as a special episode of Wednesday Night Dynamite on TBS and HBO Max in the United States with additional matches airing on tape delay as episodes of 1FW TV in syndication and on MyAEW.

The event was named after, and dedicated to, the professional wrestler Rebel, following her having been diagnosed with ALS.

== Production ==
=== Background ===
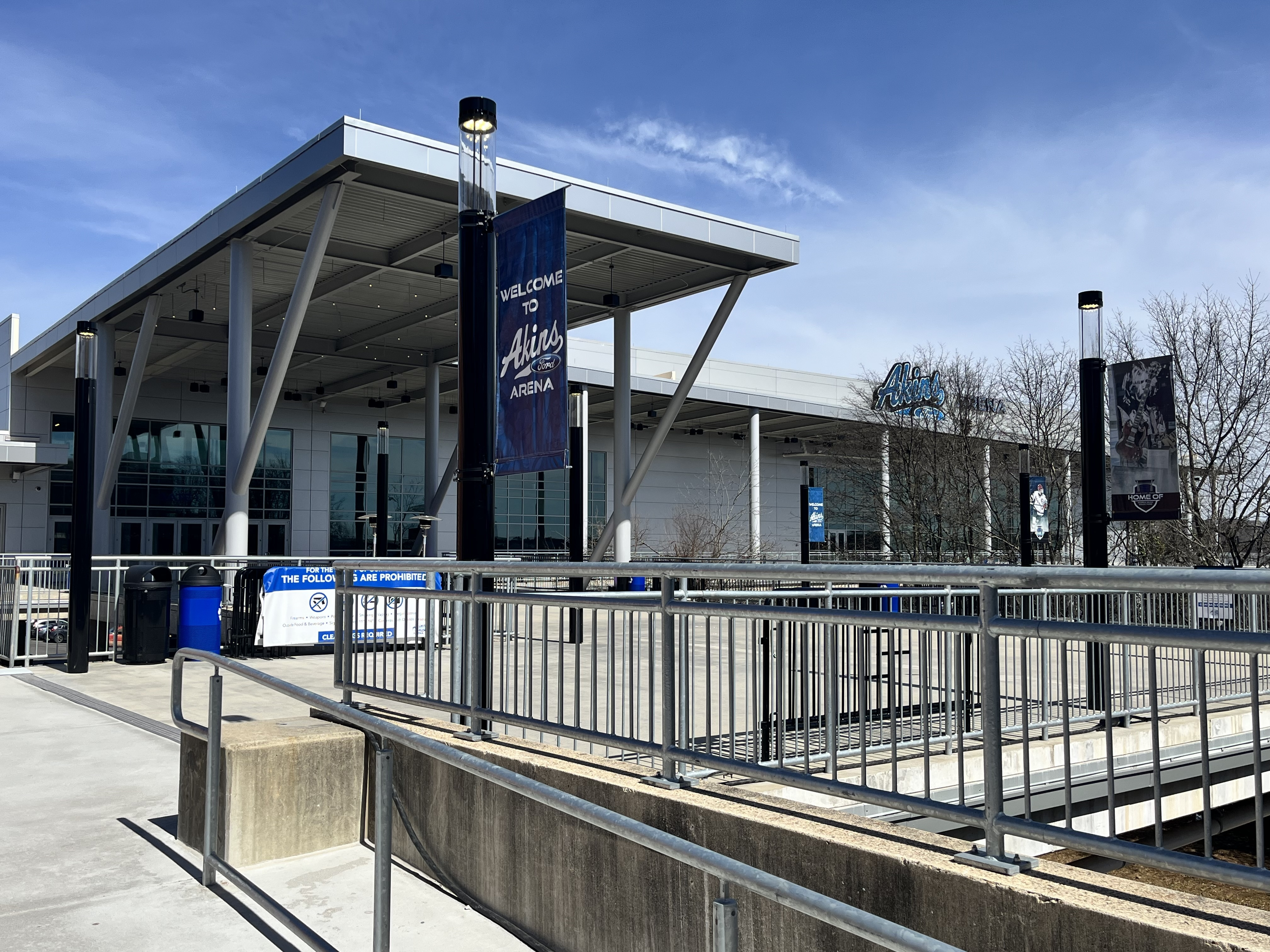
The event took place at the Akins Ford Arena in Athens, Georgia.

In November 2025, Tanea Brooks, better known by her ring name Rebel, who had been absent from AEW programming since 2022, had been diagnosed with primary pulmonary lymphoma, a rare form of non-Hodgkin's lung cancer, following prolonged period of misdiagnosed symptoms initially treated as pneumonia.

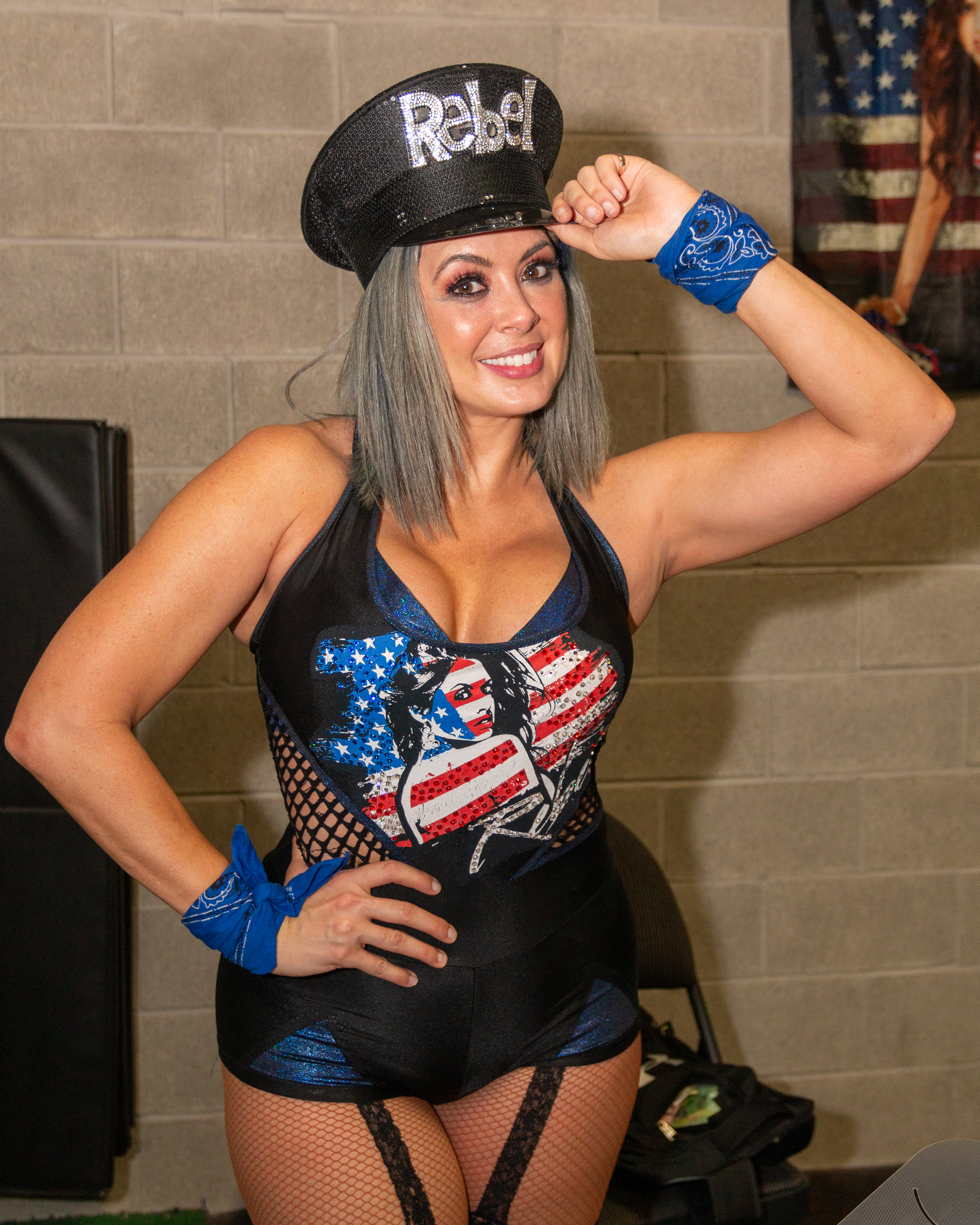
Professional wrestler Tanea Brooks, better known by her ring name Rebel.

On May 7, 2026, while undergoing treatment for her lymphoma, Brooks was also diagnosed with amyotrophic lateral sclerosis (ALS). On July 27, 2026 AEW announced that they would be presenting a television special titled Rebel Heart which would be held at the Akins Ford Arena in Athens, Georgia on September 9, 2026 with the profits from the event being donated to I AM ALS, the leading organization dedicated to ending ALS and Team Gleason, an organization founded by former New Orleans Saints player Steve Gleason to provide equipment and care services to people living with ALS and others through advocacy, research, and support to bringing an end to the disease.

On the July 30, 2026 episode of Saturday Night Collision, The Conglomeration (Orange Cassidy, Kyle O'Reilly, and Roderick Strong) participated in an ice bucket challenge in which the stable were joined by the Detroit-based hip-hop group Insane Clown Posse and Rhino who assisted in dousing the trio. On July 31, 2026, AEW owner Tony Khan took the ice bucket challenge. On August 3, 2026, Harley Cameron, the Jurassic Express, and Anna Jay took the ice bucket challenge. On August 9, 2026, Jeff Jarrett took the ice bucket challenge. On August 10, 2026, RJ City took the ice bucket challenge.

On August 11, 2026, it was announced that 1 Fall Wrestling, an independent promotion owned by AEW wrestler QT Marshall, would be holding TV tapings in conjunction with the special.

=== Storylines ===
Rebel Heart featured professional wrestling matches that involved different wrestlers from pre-existing feuds and storylines. Storylines were produced on AEW's weekly television programs, Dynamite and Collision and 1FW's weekly syndicated television program 1FW TV.

== Results ==
AEW Dynamite
No.	Results	Stipulations	Times
1	Swerve Strickland and The New Level (Kofi and Austin Creed) (c) (with Prince Nana) defeated The Conglomeration (Orange Cassidy, Roderick Strong, and Kyle O'Reilly) by pinfall	Trios match for the AEW World Trios Championship	15:05
2	Dr. Britt Baker, D.M.D., Persephone, and Hikaru Shida defeated Maya World, Thunder Rosa, Hyan by submission	Trios match	10:25
3	Andrade El Ídolo (c) defeated The Beast Mortos by pinfall	Singles match for the AEW National Championship	7:15
4	Will Ospreay (c) defeated David Finlay by pinfall	AEW World Championship eliminator match	10:30
5	Darby Allin and Steven Borden defeated The Don Callis Family (Mark Davis and Josh Alexander) (with Don Callis and Lance Archer) by pinfall	Tag team match	11:55
6	The Don Callis Family (Kyle Fletcher and Kevin Knight) defeated The Young Bucks (Matt Jackson and Nick Jackson)	Tag team tables match	15:00
(c) / – the champion(s) heading into the match

1 Fall Wrestling
No.	Results	Stipulations
1	Preston Vance defeated Rosario Grillo by pinfall	Singles match
2	Satnam Singh defeated Chad Skywalker by pinfall	Singles match
3	Tyler Shoop (c) defeated Shoot Taylor, Pretty Parker, and Jacked Jamison by pinfall	Four-way match for the 1FW Breakout Championship
4	Red Velvet (c) defeated Remi Reade by pinfall	Singles match for the ROH Women's World Television Championship
5	Nick Wayne defeated Adam Priest by pinfall	Singles match
6	Carlie Bravo defeated Brady Pierce by pinfall	Singles match
7	Angelina Risk (c) defeated Hyena Hera and Robyn Renegade by pinfall	Three-way match for the 1FW Women's Championship
8	Billy Gunn, QT Marshall, Brady Booker, and Elijah Drago defeated The Supastarz (Jimmy Wild, Nikki Eight, and Tommy Mars) and Sledge by pinfall	Eight-man lumberjack match
(c) / – the champion(s) heading into the match
