= SummerStage 2 =

Professional wrestling television special

- Promotional poster
- Promotion: 1 Fall Wrestling
- Date: July 17, 2026
- City: Atlanta, Georgia
- Venue: Center Stage Theater
- Attendance: 700

1 Fall Wrestling events chronology
← Previous; Raceway Rumble	Next → Rebel Heart

SummerStage 2 was a professional wrestling supercard event produced by 1 Fall Wrestling (1FW). The event took place on July 17, 2026 at the Center Stage Theater in Atlanta, Georgia and was aired on tape delay as episodes of the promotion's weekly syndicated show 1FW TV.

== Production ==
=== Background ===
1 Fall Wrestling was first launched in 2017 with the first show taking place on December 12, 2017 at the Landmark Arena in Cornelia, Georgia. On February 22, 2019, 1FW crowned the inaugural 1FW Heavyweight Champion when Elijah Evans IV defeated Cody Vance during the Fallout show at the One Fall Power Factory in Norcross, Georgia. After Vindication on September 27, 2019, 1FW would go on hiatus. On April 25, 2025, 1FW was relaunched with its first show since its hiatus taking place at Freedom Brew & Shine in Cumming, Georgia. On July 25, 2025, 1FW held its first SummerStage event with the main event being Elijah Drago defending the 1FW Heavyweight Championship against Brady Booker. On June 15, 2026, 1FW announced that Darby Allin would be making his 1FW debut during the event in a no disqualification match against Kiran Grey.

=== Storylines ===
SummerStage 2 featured professional wrestling matches that involved different wrestlers from pre-existing feuds and storylines. Storylines were produced on 1FW's weekly syndicated television program 1FW TV.

== Results ==
No.	Results	Stipulations	Times
1	Tyler Shoop defeated Vary Morales (c), Adam Priest, Chad Skywalker, Parker Li, Satnam Singh, and Shawn Dean	Ladder match for the 1FW Breakout Championship	10:53
2	The Wreckoning (Brick Aldridge and Nick Comoroto) defeated Holden Glass and Trevor Blackwell and Big Stoke and Lee Johnson and Mark Davidson and The Warden by pinfall	Four-way tag team match	10:15
3	Amira Soul, Joiya Blake, and Robyn Renegade (with Charlette Renegade) defeated Ezabella Wilder, Remi Reade, and Trish Adora by pinfall	Six-woman tag team match	11:31
4	Angelica Risk (c) defeated Hyena Hera and Shotzi Blackheart by pinfall	Three-way match for the 1FW Women's Championship	13:38
5	Darby Allin defeated Kiran Grey by pinfall	No disqualification match	12:21
6	Brady Booker and Elijah Drago defeated The Aura (Corey Hollis and Josey Quinn) by pinfall	Tag team match for the vacant 1FW Tag Team Championship	0:58
7	Jay Lethal defeated Jonathan Gresham by pinfall	Singles match	14:40
8	The Frat House (Jacked Jameson and Preston Vance) and Glacier defeated Il Cartello Grillo (Hayden Seal, KayJay Impala, and Rosario Grillo) by pinfall	Six-man tag team match	9:07
9	The Gunn Club (Austin Gunn, Billy Gunn, and Colten Gunn) defeated The Supastarz (Jimmy Wild, Nikki Eight, and Tommy Mars) by pinfall	Six-man tag team match	10:01
10	Carlie Bravo defeated Brady Pierce (c) and QT Marshall by pinfall	Triple threat match for the 1FW Heavyweight Championship	14:03
(c) / – the champion(s) heading into the match
