= Metroplex Wrestling =

American professional wrestling promotion

- Acronym: MPX
- Founded: 2010
- Style: Professional wrestling
- Headquarters: Bedford, Texas
- Founder: Steven Kirby
- Owner(s): Ernie Pruitt; Athena
- Website: mpxwrestling.com

Metroplex Wrestling (MPX) is an American independent professional wrestling promotion based in Bedford, Texas. It is owned by Ernie Pruitt and Adrienne Palmer, better known by her ring name Athena.

== History ==
On April 3, 2010, MPX held their fist event titled Breaking Ground at the Metroflex Gym in Bedford, Texas. The first MPX champion being crowned the same night in a battle royal with Thomas Wood being the inaugural champion.

In 2022, Athena, who had been working with All Elite Wrestling (AEW) and its sister promotion Ring of Honor, and Ernie Pruitt acquired the promotion from Steven Kirby.

On January 31, 2026, MPX teamed up with Ring of Honor, a sister promotion to All Elite Wrestling (AEW) owned by Tony Khan to present a special episode of Ring of Honor Wrestling titled ROH x Metroplex Global Wars from Esports Stadium Arlington in Arlington, Texas. On March 7, 2026, MPX held a tournament to crown the inaugural MPX American Joshi Champion during the Who Runs The World? 3 event in Irving, Texas with Anarkid Ash being crowned the inaugural champion.

On July 30, 2026, AEW announced that Metroplex Wrestling was added to the MyAEW streaming service alongside the United Wrestling Network (UWN), Pro-Wrestling: EVE (EVE), Revolution Pro Wrestling (RevPro), Westside Xtreme Wrestling (WXW), America's Most Liked Wrestling (AML), and WrestleCade. On September 18, 2026, MPX held their first MyAEW pay-per-view event titled Who Runs The World? 4 at the Southwest Community Center in Fort Worth, Texas.

== Championships ==
Championship	Current Champion(s)	Date won	Days held	Event	Location	Notes
MPX Championship	Delynn Cavens	April 11, 2026	196+	Destiny	Grand Prairie, Texas	Defeated JD Griffey in a steel cage match.
MPX Addicts Championship	Redd Chambers	February 21, 2026	245+	Booked & Cooked	Bedford, Texas	Defeated Tommy Becker and Tatum Manning in a three-way match
MPX American Joshi Championship	Anarkid Ash	March 7, 2026	231+	Who Runs The World? 3	Irving, Texas	
MPX Prospects Championship	Kaimi	May 23, 2026	154+	LVL Up	Bedford, Texas	
MPX Tag Team Championship	Exodus Prime and Tatum Manning	March 14, 2026	224+	Fist & Fury	Bedford, Texas	
MPX Women's Championship	VertVixen	July 11, 2026	105+	Who Runs The World? 4	Fort Worth, Texas	
