= MyAEW =

Streaming service owned by All Elite Wrestling

- Type: OTT; FAST
- Broadcast area: Worldwide
- Headquarters: 1 Tower Court, Suite 402; Jacksonville, Florida, United States

Programming
- Language: English
- Picture format: HDTV (1080p 16:9)

Ownership
- Owner: Beatnik Investments, LLC; Kiswe Mobile, Inc.
- Parent: All Elite Wrestling
- Sister channels: Honor Club

History
- Launched: March 9, 2026
- Founder: Tony Khan
- Replaced: AEW Plus (on Triller TV)

Links
- Website: myaew.com

MyAEW is a subscription video on demand over-the-top streaming service and 24/7 FAST channel owned by the American professional wrestling promotion All Elite Wrestling (AEW).

The service primarily carries the company's library content, including past episodes of Dynamite, Dark, Dark: Elevation, Rampage and Collision, pay-per-view and live-streaming events from AEW and its sister promotion Ring of Honor (ROH) as well as other promotions such as Consejo Mundial de Lucha Libre (CMLL), Maple Leaf Pro Wrestling (MLP), 1 Fall Wrestling (1FW), Produce by Orange Crush (Produce), Warrior Wrestling, Revolution Pro Wrestling (RevPro), Pro-Wrestling: EVE (EVE), Westside Xtreme Wrestling (wXw), United Wrestling Network (UWN), WrestleCade, podcasts, shorts and other bonus material.

== History ==
AEW launched MyAEW on March 9, 2026, in partnership with Kiswe as an over-the-top streaming service and Free ad-supported streaming television network available worldwide outside of the United States and Canada (select shows from the service's lineup and the FAST channel are available in the United States in Canada). The service hosts episodes of AEW's programs and all pay-per-view (PPV) events, live and on-demand, as well as hosting the archive for prior programs and all PPVs. It also hosts select archives for ROH. AEW's first pay-per-view to stream on MyAEW was Revolution.

On May 22, 2026, 1 Fall Wrestling (1FW) announced that they would be the first independent promotion to feature its content on All Elite Wrestling (AEW)'s recently launched MyAEW streaming service. On May 25, 2026, during the Double or Nothing media scrum, Tony Khan confirmed plans to feature multiple promotions on the MyAEW service and that it was a key part of AEW's international strategy. On June 5, 2026, PRODUCE Wrestling, an independent professional wrestling promotion owned by Adam Abdalla, the founder of Orange Crush publication, had signed a pay-per-view distribution deal with MyAEW to stream their events beginning with PRODUCE Volume 1: The Octopus. On June 14, Limitless Wrestling announced a partnership agreement with MyAEW. Two days later, Capital City Championship Combat (C4) announced they were joining the platform. On June 17, it was announced that Create-A-Pro, Warrior Wrestling and WrestlePro would also join. On July 10, 2026, Maple Leaf Pro Wrestling (MLP) announced that they had signed a streaming deal with the service to air Mayhem worldwide. On July 30, 2026, the United Wrestling Network (UWN), Metroplex Wrestling (MPX), Pro-Wrestling: EVE (EVE), Revolution Pro Wrestling (RevPro), Westside Xtreme Wrestling (WXW), America's Most Liked Wrestling (AML), and WrestleCade were added to the platform. On November 5, 2026, Mystery Wrestling announced that they would be joining the service with archives of their events being added to the service.

== Promotions ==
Promotion	Abbreviation	Programming	Owner	Date added
All Elite Wrestling (Note: Content availablity differs between countries)	AEW	Pay-per-view events, Dynamite, Dark, Dark: Elevation, Rampage, special events, and Collision	Tony Khan	March 9, 2026
Ring of Honor (Note: Content availablity differs between countries)	ROH	Pay-per-view events and Ring of Honor Wrestling	Tony Khan	March 9, 2026
1 Fall Wrestling	1FW	1FW TV	Michael Cuellari	May 22, 2026
Produce by Orange Crush	PRODUCE	Pay-per-view events	Adam Abdalla	June 5, 2026
Limitless Wrestling	Limitless	Major events	Randy Carver	June 14, 2026
Capital City Championship Combat	C4	Major events	Mark Pollesel	June 16, 2026
Create-A-Pro	CAP	Major events and CAP TV	Brian Myers and Pat Buck	June 17, 2026
Warrior Wrestling	—N/a	Major events	Steve Tortorello	June 17, 2026
WrestlePro	—N/a	Major events	Pat Buck	June 17, 2026
Consejo Mundial de Lucha Libre	CMLL	Pay-per-view events	Salvador Lutteroth III	June 19, 2026
Maple Leaf Pro Wrestling	MLP	Pay-per-view events and Mayhem	Scott D'Amore	July 10, 2026
United Wrestling Network	UWN	Major events, Sunday Night Slam, Championship Wrestling, and Gotham Wrestling	David Marquez	July 30, 2026
Metroplex Wrestling	MPX	Major events	Ernie Pruitt and Adrienne Palmer	July 30, 2026
Pro-Wrestling: EVE	EVE	Major events	Dann Read and Emily Read	July 30, 2026
Revolution Pro Wrestling	RevPro/RPW	Major events	Andy Quildan	July 30, 2026
Westside Xtreme Wrestling	wXw	Major events	Peter Wiechers	July 30, 2026
America's Most Liked Wrestling	AML	Major events	Tracy Myers and Brian Hawks	July 30, 2026
WrestleCade	—N/a	Major events	Tracy Myers and Brian Hawks	July 30, 2026
Mystery Wrestling	—N/a	VOD archives	Nicolas Dansereau	November 5, 2026
