= 1FW Heavyweight Championship =

Men's professional wrestling championship

Details
- Promotion: 1 Fall Wrestling
- Date established: 2018
- Current champion: Carlie Bravo
- Date won: July 17, 2026
Statistics
- First champion: Elijah Evans IV
- Longest reign: Brady Booker (226 days)
- Shortest reign: Carlie Bravo (75 days)

The 1FW Heavyweight Championship is a world heavyweight championship in 1 Fall Wrestling (1FW). The current champion is Carlie Bravo, who is in his first reign.

== Reigns ==
Key
No.	Overall reign number
Reign	Reign number for the specific champion
Days	Number of days held

No.	Champion	Championship change			Reign statistics		Notes	Ref.
No.	Champion	Date	Event	Location	Reign	Days	Notes	Ref.
1	Elijah Evans	N/A	N/A	Norcross, Georgia	1	N/A		
2	Tim Miller	N/A	N/A	Norcross, Georgia	1	N/A		
3	Elijah Drago	N/A	N/A	Jefferson, Georgia	1	N/A		
4	Brady Booker	July 25, 2025	SummerStage	Atlanta, Georgia	1	226		
5	Brady Pierce	March 8, 2026	1FW TV	McDonough, Georgia	1	131	Aired on tape delay on April 21, 2026	
6	Carlie Bravo	July 17, 2026	SummerStage 2	Atlanta, Georgia	1	70+	Defeated Brady Pierce in a triple threat match which featured QT Marshall	
