= UWN Sunday Night Slam =

American professional wrestling event

- Genre: Professional wrestling
- Created by: David Marquez
- Presented by: Jonny Loquasto (play-by-play commentator); Todd Keneley (color commentator)
- Starring: UWN roster
- Country of origin: United States
- Original language: English

Production
- Producer: David Marquez
- Camera setup: Multicamera setup
- Production companies: David Marquez Productions; Championship Television

Original release
- Network: YouTube; Triller TV; MyAEW
- Release: March 8, 2026 – present

UWN Sunday Night Slam is a monthly professional wrestling special event produced by the United Wrestling Network. The specials are streamed live on YouTube and Triller TV at the Thunder Studios Arena in Long Beach, California with extra footage taped for Gotham Wrestling and Championship Wrestling.

== Events ==
Event No.	Date	City	Venue	Main Event
1	March 8, 2026	Long Beach, California	Thunder Studios Arena	Jordan Cruz (c) vs. Chris Masters for the UWN World Championship
2	April 5, 2026	Long Beach, California	Thunder Studios Arena	Jordan Cruz (c) vs. Fred Rosser for the UWN World Championship
3	June 14, 2026	Long Beach, California	Thunder Studios Arena	Jordan Cruz (c) vs. Willie Mack for the UWN World Championship
4	August 8, 2026	Long Beach, California	Thunder Studios Arena	Red Carpet Rumble match
5	September 13, 2026	Long Beach, California	Thunder Studios Arena	Jordan Cruz (c) vs. TJP for the UWN World Championship
(c) – refers to the champion(s) heading into the match
