= SummerStage (2025) =

Professional wrestling television special

- Promotional poster
- Promotion: 1 Fall Wrestling
- Date: July 25, 2025
- City: Atlanta, Georgia
- Venue: Center Stage Theater
- Attendance: 550

1 Fall Wrestling events chronology
← Previous; Monday Mayhem	Next → Mayhem at the Moose Lodge

SummerStage was a professional wrestling supercard event produced by 1 Fall Wrestling (1FW). The event took place on July 25, 2025 at the Center Stage Theater in Atlanta, Georgia and was aired in five parts on tape delay as the first five episodes of 1FW TV.

== Production ==
=== Background ===
1 Fall Wrestling was first launched in 2017 with the first show taking place on December 12, 2017 at the Landmark Arena in Cornelia, Georgia. On February 22, 2019, 1FW crowned the inaugural 1FW Heavyweight Champion when Elijah Evans IV defeated Cody Vance during the Fallout show at the One Fall Power Factory in Norcross, Georgia. After Vindication on September 27, 2019, 1FW would go on hiatus.

On March 15, 2025, QT Marshall announced that he would be relaunching 1FW with the first show taking place on April 25, 2025 at Freedom Brew & Shine in Cumming, Georgia.

On May 21, 2025, 1FW announced that they would be holding the first SummerStage event at Center Stage Theater in Atlanta, Georgia on July 25, 2025. On May 30, 2025, 1FW announced that AEW wrestler MJF would be making an appearance at the event. On June 25, 2025, 1FW announced that Elijah Drago would be defending the 1FW Heavyweight Championship against Brady Booker. In addition to this announcement, 1FW also announced several more matches including Jay Lethal accompanied by Sonjay Dutt vs. Adam Priest, the Frat House (Cole Karter, Griff Garrison, Jacked Jameso, and Preston Vance) vs. Brody King, QT Marshall, and The Gunn Club (Austin Gunn and Billy Gunn) along with special appearances by AEW commentator Tony Schiavone and Harley Cameron.

=== Storylines ===
SummerStage featured professional wrestling matches that involved different wrestlers from pre-existing feuds and storylines. Storylines were produced on 1FW's weekly syndicated television program 1FW TV.

== Results ==
Other on-screen personnel
Role:	Name:
Commentators	Brandon Benefield
Commentators	Conrad Thompson

No.	Results	Stipulations	Times
1^{D}	Nasty Leroy defeated ???, Alex Kytel, Bryce Cannon, Chris Del Ray, Christian Taylor, Cody McCulley, Hayden Seal, Jamie Holmes, KayJay Impala, Lamar Diggs, and Tommy Mars	Battle royal	—
2	Jay Lethal (with Sonjay Dutt) defeated Adam Priest by pinfall	Singles match	1:54
3	Aaron Solo (c) defeated Carlie Bravo and Michael Allen Richard Clark by pinfall	Three-way match for the BTW Heavyweight Championship	11:57
4	Brody King, QT Marshall and The Gunn Club (Austin Gunn and Billy Gunn) defeated The Frat House (Cole Karter, Griff Garrison, Jacked Jameson, and Preston Vance) by pinfall	Eight-man tag team match	12:16
5	Sid Ellington defeated Kiran Grey	Coffin match	20:30
6	Vary Morales defeated Adrian Ward, JD Ink, Jimmy Wild, Mark Davidson, Parker Li, Rosario Grillo, Satnam Singh, Trevor Blackwell, and Tyler Shoop	Casino gauntlet match for the 1FW Breakout Championship	17:02
7	Isis Reade defeated Angelica Risk, Hyena Hera, Robyn Renegade (with Charlette Renegade) by pinfall	Four-way match for the 1FW Women's Championship	15:50
8	Brady Booker defeated Elijah Drago (c) by pinfall	Steel cage match for the 1FW World Heavyweight Championship	13:04
(c) / – the champion(s) heading into the match; D / – this was a dark match
