= List of Global Force Wrestling tournaments =

Global Force Wrestling has held a variety of professional wrestling tournaments competed for by wrestlers that are a part of their roster.

== Sporadic tournaments ==
The GFW Championship Tournaments took place between July 25–October 23, 2015.

=== GFW NEX*GEN Championship Tournament (2015) ===
No.	Results	Stipulations	Times
1	PJ Black defeated Seiya Sanada	GFW NEX*GEN Championship Tournament match	08:50
2	Jigsaw defeated Sonjay Dutt	GFW NEX*GEN Championship Tournament match	10:30
3	TJP defeated Andrew Everett	GFW NEX*GEN Championship Tournament match	10:55
4	Virgil Flynn defeated Trevor Lee	GFW NEX*GEN Championship Tournament match	8:22
5	PJ Black defeated Jigsaw, TJP and Virgil Flynn	GFW NEX*GEN Championship Tournament Finals match	11:54

=== GFW Tag Team Championship Tournament (2015) ===
No.	Results	Stipulations	Times
1	The Bollywood Boyz (Gurv Sihra and Harv Sihra) defeated The Akbars (Ali Akbar and Omar Akbar)	GFW Tag Team Championship Tournament match	08:55
2	Reno Scum (Adam Thornstowe and Luster the Legend) defeated Los Luchas (Phoenix Star and Zokre)	GFW Tag Team Championship Tournament match	09:10
3	Teaze ‘n’ Sleaze (Juicy Joey and Kenny Klimax) defeated Cielo and Misterioso Jr.	GFW Tag Team Championship Tournament match	06:40
4	Bullet Club (Doc Gallows and Karl Anderson) (with Amber Gallows) defeated Killer Elite Squad (Lance Archer and Davey Boy Smith Jr.)	GFW Tag Team Championship Tournament match	09:25
5	Reno Scum (Adam Thornstowe and Luster the Legend) defeated Teaze ‘n’ Sleaze (Juicy Joey and Oozing Austin)	GFW Tag Team Championship Tournament match	07:34
6	The Bollywood Boyz (Gurv Sihra and Harv Sihra) defeated The Whirlwind Gentlemen (Jack Manley and Remy Marcel)	GFW Tag Team Championship Tournament match	09:50
7	The Bollywood Boyz (Gurv Sihra and Harv Sihra) defeated Reno Scum (Adam Thornstowe and Luster the Legend) (with Christina Von Eerie)	GFW Tag Team Championship Tournament Finals match	11:48

=== GFW Women's Championship Tournament (2015) ===
No.	Results	Stipulations	Times
1	Christina Von Eerie defeated Lei'D Tapa (with Royal Red) and Mickie James	GFW Women's Championship Tournament match	07:10
2	Amber Gallows defeated Katarina Leigh and Laura James	GFW Women's Championship Tournament match	08:19
3	Christina Von Eerie defeated Amber Gallows	GFW Women's Championship Tournament Finals match	11:34

=== GFW Global Championship Tournament (2015) ===
No.	Results	Stipulations	Times
1	Nick Aldis defeated Kongo Kong (with Henry Maxwell)	GFW Global Championship Tournament match	09:40
2	Chris Mordetsky defeated Brian Myers	GFW Global Championship Tournament match	08:47
3	Shelton Benjamin defeated JR Kratos	GFW Global Championship Tournament match	05:58
4	Bobby Roode defeated Eric Young	GFW Global Championship Tournament match	09:17
5	Nick Aldis defeated Chris Mordetzky	GFW Global Championship Tournament match	11:15

=== GFW Tag Team Championship Tournament (2017) ===
After The Bollywood Boyz vacated the titles to join the WWE there was a tournament to crown new GFW Tag Team Champions. The tournament took place within Impact Wrestling.

Semifinals
1	The Latin American Xchange (Santana and Ortiz)	12:00
4	Garza Jr. & Laredo Kid	Pin
3	Veterans of War (Mayweather and Wilcox)	5:11
2	Fallah Bahh & Mario Bokara	Pin

Final
The Latin American Xchange	Pin
Veterans of War	7:00
