= ROH x Metroplex Global Wars =

2026 professional wrestling event

- Promotional poster featuring various ROH and Metroplex wrestlers
- Promotion(s): Ring of Honor (ROH); Metroplex Wrestling (MPX)
- Date: January 31, 2026 (aired February 5, 2026)
- City: Arlington, Texas
- Venue: Esports Stadium Arlington

Ring of Honor special events chronology
| ← Previous; Boxing Day Brawl | Next → Supercard Showdown |

ROH Global Wars chronology
| ← Previous; United Kingdom | Next → Canada |

ROH x Metroplex Global Wars was a professional wrestling event produced by Ring of Honor (ROH) and Metroplex Wrestling. It was the 21st Global Wars show and took place on Saturday, January 31, 2026, at Esports Stadium Arlington in Arlington, Texas and aired on tape delay on February 5, 2026 on Honor Club as a special episode of Ring of Honor Wrestling.

== Production ==
=== Background ===
Global Wars is a professional wrestling event held sporadically by the American promotion Ring of Honor (ROH) since 2012. Originally named "Border Wars" and co-produced with the Japanese promotion Pro Wrestling Noah, the event was renamed Global Wars in 2014 after ROH announced a partnership with New Japan Pro-Wrestling.

Under the new name, the event became a supershow and later a multi-day tour co-produced by the two promotions. In 2019, ROH announced a three-event tour with the Mexican promotion Consejo Mundial de Lucha Libre as the new partner for the tour, renamed "Global Wars Espectacular". The Global Wars Espectacular tour marked the last Global Wars event held by ROH under the ownership of Sinclair Broadcast Group.

On January 15, 2026, ROH announced that they would partner with Metroplex Wrestling to present a joint Global Wars show which would air on January 29, 2026. On January 16, 2026 it was announced that the show would take place on January 24, 2026 at Esports Stadium Arlington in Arlington, Texas. The show would later be rescheduled to January 31, 2026 due to an anticipated winter storm in the region.

== Results ==
| No. | Results | Stipulations | Times |
|---|---|---|---|
| 1 | Shane Taylor Promotions (Carlie Bravo, Shane Taylor, Shawn Dean, and Trish Adora) defeated Demo Diamond, Kari Jai Wright, LVJ, and Reiza Clarke | Eight person tag team match | 7:35 |
| 2 | Red Velvet [c] defeated Vertvixen | ROH Women's World Television Championship Proving Ground singles match | 7:05 |
| 3 | Big Bill and Bryan Keith defeated Surf And Turf (Braddah Kaimi and Phil Shark) | Tag team match | 5:46 |
| 4 | Abadon (c) defeated Ray Lyn | Singles match for the MPX Women's Championship | 5:45 |
| 5 | Lee Moriarty [c] defeated Exodus Prime | ROH Pure Championship Proving Ground singles match | 6:25 |
| 6 | JD Griffey defeated Delynn Cavens (c) | Singles match for the MPX Championship | 4:03 |
| 7 | Maya World, Hyan, and Deonna Purrazzo defeated The Minions / M.I.T. (Athena, Billie Starkz and Diamanté) | Six woman tag team match | 11:45 |
(c) / – the champion(s) heading into the match
