= Global Force Wrestling =

American professional wrestling company

Global Force Entertainment, LLC.
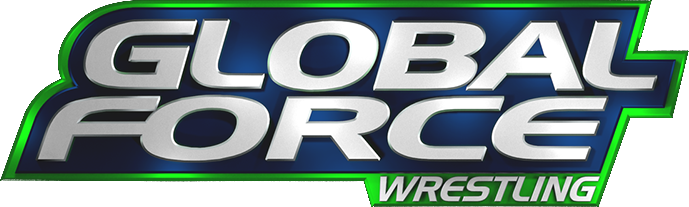
- Acronym: GFW
- Founded: April 7, 2014 (incorporated); June 12, 2015 (first event)
- Defunct: March 18, 2017 (last event); October 21, 2018 (as producer)
- Headquarters: Nashville, Tennessee
- Founder(s): Jeff Jarrett; Karen Jarrett
- Owner: Jeff Jarrett
- Website: globalforceentertainment.com

Global Force Entertainment, LLC. (trading as Global Force Wrestling) was an American professional wrestling promotion incorporated in 2014 by Jeff Jarrett, the co-founder and former President of Total Nonstop Action Wrestling (TNA), and his wife Karen Jarrett.

GFW ran several live events and tapings for a potential television show. Jeff returned to TNA in an executive role in January 2017, and Karen announced that the promotions had "merged" on April 20, 2017. The promotion assumed the GFW name the following month, but it was dropped when the Jarretts departed the company four months later.

Global Force Wrestling held its final event on March 18, 2017, and its final credit as a co-producer was the NWA 70th Anniversary Show on October 21, 2018.

== History ==
=== Formation and live events ===
With Jeff Jarrett out as minority investor of TNA Wrestling, he debuted the branding of Global Force Wrestling (business name Global Force Entertainment, LLC) in April 2014 and began promoting the brand and establishing international partnerships with wrestling promotions across the world. The organization had a strategic partnership with 25/7 Productions and David Broome (creator of NBC's The Biggest Loser). Broome stated that the organization planned to create new on-air content 52 weeks per year.

By August 2014, GFW announced working agreements with Mexican promotion Lucha Libre AAA World Wide (AAA), Japan's New Japan Pro-Wrestling (NJPW) promotion, multiple European promotions, South African promotion World Wrestling Professionals (WWP), and promotions from Australia and New Zealand. As part of GFW's relationship with New Japan Pro-Wrestling, it presented NJPW's Wrestle Kingdom 9 at the Tokyo Dome on the American pay-per-view market on January 4, 2015. The pay-per-view featured English language commentary from Jim Ross and Matt Striker. Wrestle Kingdom 9 reportedly drew 12,000 to 15,000 buys in North America.

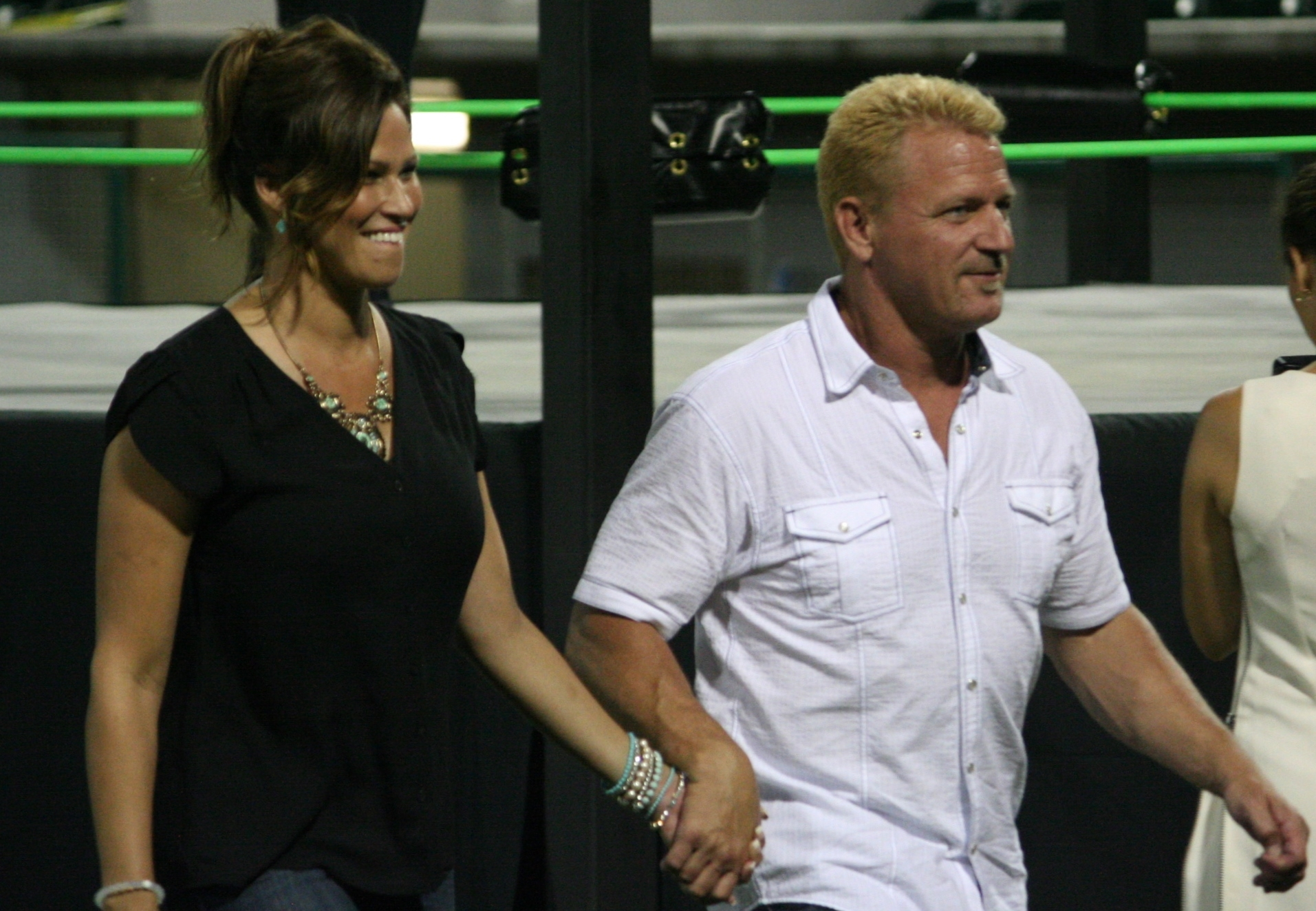
Co-founders Karen and Jeff Jarrett

Throughout May 2015, Jarrett announced talent for their roster, which included Bullet Club members Karl Anderson and Doc Gallows, the Killer Elite Squad, and Chael Sonnen as an expert analyst. Jarrett also announced that four champions (Global, NEX*GEN, Tag Team and Women's Champion) would be crowned at the July 24 tapings.

The first Global Force Wrestling house show took place on June 12, 2015, at The Ballpark at Jackson in Jackson, Tennessee, as part of GFW's "Grand Slam Tour", which entailed holding events at minor league baseball stadiums. In that show's main event, Karl Anderson and Doc Gallows defeated the New Heavenly Bodies.

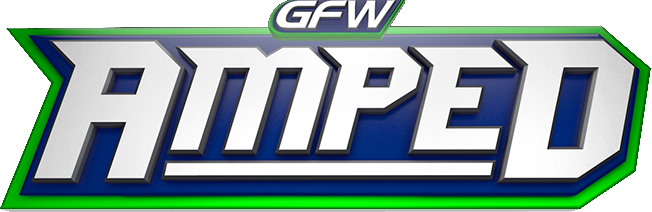
Logo of the proposed Amped show

On July 9, 2015, Jeff Jarrett announced that the name of GFW's television program was "Amped". Tapings for Amped took place at the Orleans Arena in Las Vegas, Nevada on July 24, August 21, and October 23, 2015. In a December 2015 interview, Jeff Jarrett said that they had sixteen one-hour shows filmed at the Las Vegas tapings and hoped to have the programs air globally on television in the future.

GFW announced that they had signed an international TV distribution deal with Boulder Creek TV in the UK on September 14, 2015, and with New Zealand's TVNZ Duke on February 18, 2016. Despite this, no tapings of Amped ever aired until 2017, when footage from them was aired as Impact One Night Only pay-per-view specials. Overall, the promotion held 36 live events.

=== Association with Impact Wrestling and lawsuits ===
After returning to TNA in early 2017 as the promotion's chief creative officer, Jarrett stated that GFW and the newly renamed Impact Wrestling were "becoming one day-by-day". On the April 20 episode of Impact Wrestling, Karen Jarrett announced that GFW and Impact Wrestling had officially merged. In a press release issued on June 28, Impact Wrestling announced that their parent company, Anthem Sports & Entertainment Corp., had entered into an agreement to acquire the rights to GFW. After the announcement, Impact Wrestling rebranded and took on the Global Force Wrestling name. Jeff Jarrett took an indefinite leave of absence from the company in September and Anthem slowly reverted to using the Impact Wrestling name. Impact Wrestling's rebranding was officially over on October 23, when Impact announced that its business partnership with Jeff Jarrett and GFW was terminated. The deal for Anthem to acquire GFW was never completed and Jeff Jarrett continues to own the rights to GFW. Global Force Wrestling returned with a private show held for the Kentucky Wildcats and Northwestern Wildcats on December 27, 2017.

On August 14, 2018, Jeff Jarrett and Global Force Entertainment announced that it had filed a lawsuit against Anthem Sports & Entertainment in the District Court of Tennessee for copyright infringement over the GFW rights, as Jarrett owned all GFW properties since its creation in 2014. It was revealed on February 19, 2019, that Jarrett filed another lawsuit claiming that Impact Wrestling had deleted the master copies of all 16 hours of GFW Amped. Jarrett also sued in attempt to get the trademarks of his name and likeness from Anthem. Anthem counter-sued in July 2019, arguing that they were the rightful owners of the "Jeff Jarrett" copyright, that Jarrett knew the master tapes had been deleted, that they made no money off of GFW's content and that the looks and trademarks of GFW and their former Global Wrestling Network app are not similar.

A mistrial was declared on July 30, 2020. The jury had come to a verdict but this was voided by a judge after a motion by Anthem stated that comments made by Jarrett's attorney had prejudiced them. In October, Jarrett's request for a new trial was denied without prejudice, meaning that he could have requested a new trial at a later date. However, Jarrett and Anthem reached a settlement in January 2021.

=== Promotional return ===
In May 2018, FITE TV announced that they had reached a deal with Global Force Entertainment to produce content for the streaming network. The first event Global Force Entertainment produced for FITE TV was Starrcast, which was held during the week of All In from August 28 to September 2, 2018.

On October 21, 2018, Global Force Entertainment co-produced the NWA 70th Anniversary Show with the National Wrestling Alliance in Nashville, Tennessee.

Global Force Entertainment would become dormant in the following year, as Jarrett was hired by WWE as a backstage producer and member of their creative team, a job which would last through to January 2021 as he left in order to pursue new projects potentially related to Global Force Entertainment. He would ultimately return to WWE for a stint as Senior Vice President of Live Events from May to August of the following year. That November, Jarrett would join All Elite Wrestling. This has precluded any more involvement with Global Force Entertainment.

== Championships ==
| Championship | Final champion(s) | Date Established | Date Retired | Previous champion(s) | Inaugural champion |
|---|---|---|---|---|---|
| GFW Global Championship | Alberto El Patron | October 23, 2015 | August 14, 2017 | Magnus | Magnus |
| GFW NEX*GEN Championship | Cody Rhodes | October 23, 2015 | July 4, 2017 | Sonjay Dutt | P. J. Black |
| GFW Tag Team Championship | The Latin American Xchange (Ortiz and Santana) | October 23, 2015 | July 3, 2017 | Vacant | The Bollywood Boyz (Gurv Sihra and Harv Sihra) |
| GFW Women's Championship | Sienna | October 23, 2015 | July 2, 2017 | Christina Von Eerie | Christina Von Eerie |

=== GFW Global Championship ===
GFW Global Championship
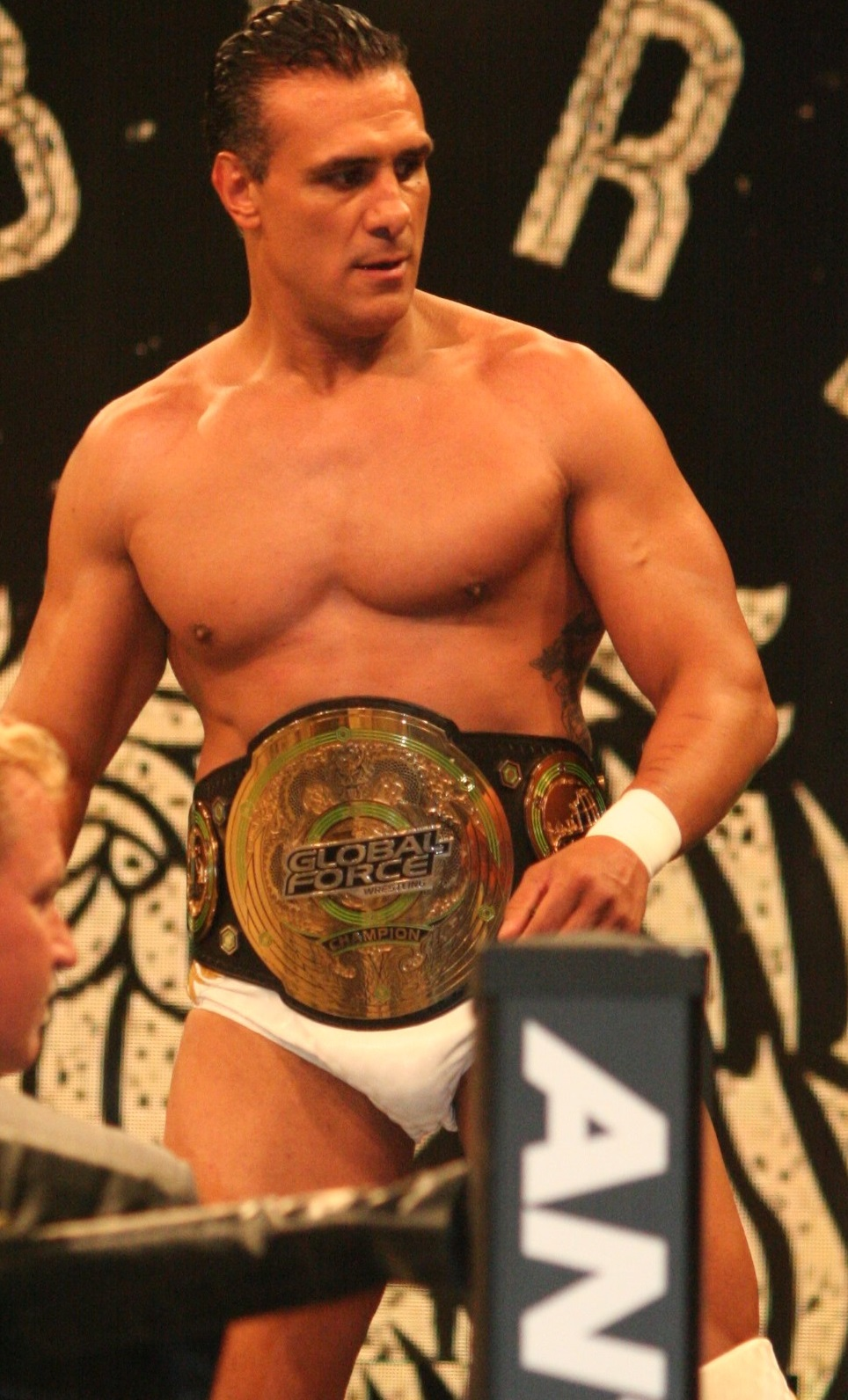
- Alberto El Patron as the GFW Global Championship around his waist in 2017.

Details
- Promotion: Global Force Wrestling (2015 – 2017); Impact Wrestling (2017)
- Date established: October 23, 2015
- Date retired: July 2, 2017 (unified with the Impact World Heavyweight Championship)
Statistics
- First champion: Nick Aldis
- Final champion: Alberto El Patrón
- Most reigns: All titleholders (1 reign)
- Longest reign: Nick Aldis (547 days)
- Shortest reign: Alberto El Patrón (71 days)
- Oldest champion: Alberto El Patrón (39 years, 332 days)
- Youngest champion: Nick Aldis (28 years, 351 days)
- Heaviest champion: Alberto El Patrón (240 lb (110 kg))
- Lightest champion: Nick Aldis (239 lb (108 kg))

Key
| No. | Overall reign number |
| Reign | Reign number for the specific champion |
| Days | Number of days held |

| No. | Champion | Championship change | | | Reign statistics | | Notes | Ref. |
| No. | Champion | Date | Event | Location | Reign | Days | Notes | Ref. |
|---|---|---|---|---|---|---|---|---|
| 1 | Nick Aldis | October 23, 2015 | GFW Amped | Las Vegas, Nevada | 1 | 547 | Defeated Bobby Roode to become the inaugural champion. He later went by Magnus during his reign. | |
| 2 | Alberto El Patrón | April 22, 2017 | Impact Wrestling | Orlando, Florida | 1 | 71 | | |
| — | Unified | July 2, 2017 | Slammiversary XV | Orlando, Florida | — | — | El Patrón defeated Lashley to unify the GFW Global Championship with the Impact World Championship. | |

=== GFW NEX*GEN Championship ===
GFW NEX*GEN Championship

Details
- Promotion: Global Force Wrestling; Impact Wrestling
- Date established: August 21, 2015
- Date retired: June 4, 2017
Statistics
- First champion: P. J. Black
- Final champion: Cody Rhodes
- Most reigns: All titleholders (1 reign)
- Longest reign: Sonjay Dutt (364 days)
- Shortest reign: P. J. Black (98 days)
- Oldest champion: Sonjay Dutt (33 years, 234 days)
- Youngest champion: Cody Rhodes (31 years, 148 days)
- Heaviest champion: Cody Rhodes (220 lb (100 kg))
- Lightest champion: Sonjay Dutt (194 lb (88 kg))

Key
| No. | Overall reign number |
| Reign | Reign number for the specific champion |
| Days | Number of days held |

| No. | Champion | Championship change | | | Reign statistics | | Notes | Ref. |
| No. | Champion | Date | Event | Location | Reign | Days | Notes | Ref. |
|---|---|---|---|---|---|---|---|---|
| 1 | P. J. Black | August 21, 2015 | GFW Amped | Las Vegas, Nevada | 1 | 98 | Defeated Jigsaw, T. J. Perkins and Virgil Flynn to become the inaugural champion. Aired on tape delay on October 13, 2015 | |
| 2 | Sonjay Dutt | November 27, 2015 | WrestleCade Showcase of Champions (2015) | Winston-Salem, North Carolina | 1 | 364 | | |
| 3 | Cody Rhodes | November 25, 2016 | WrestleCade Showcase of Champions (2016) | Winston-Salem, North Carolina | 1 | 191 | | |
| — | Deactivated | June 4, 2017 | — | — | — | — | On June 4, 2017, it was reported that Rhodes' contract had expired while he was champion. The championship has since been deactivated. | |

=== GFW Women's Championship ===
GFW Women's Championship

Details
- Promotion: Global Force Wrestling; Impact Wrestling
- Date established: October 23, 2015
- Date retired: July 2, 2017 (unified with the Impact Knockouts Championship)
Statistics
- First champion: Christina Von Eerie
- Final champion: Sienna
- Most reigns: All titleholders (1 reign)
- Longest reign: Christina Von Eerie (546 days)
- Shortest reign: Sienna (72 days)
- Oldest champion: Sienna (29 years, 167 days)
- Youngest champion: Christina Von Eerie (26 years, 56 days)
- Heaviest champion: Sienna (150 lb (68 kg))
- Lightest champion: Christina Von Eerie (123 lb (56 kg))

Key
| No. | Overall reign number |
| Reign | Reign number for the specific champion |
| Days | Number of days held |

| No. | Champion | Championship change | | | Reign statistics | | Notes | Ref. |
| No. | Champion | Date | Event | Location | Reign | Days | Notes | Ref. |
|---|---|---|---|---|---|---|---|---|
| 1 | Christina Von Eerie | October 23, 2015 | GFW Amped | Las Vegas, Nevada | 1 | 546 | Defeated Amber Gallows to become the inaugural champion. | |
| 2 | Sienna | April 21, 2017 | Impact Wrestling | Orlando, Florida | 1 | 72 | | |
| — | Unified | July 2, 2017 | Slammiversary XV | Orlando, Florida | — | — | Sienna defeated Rosemary to unify the GFW Women's Championship with the Impact Knockouts Championship. | |

=== GFW Tag Team Championship ===
GFW Tag Team Championship

Details
- Promotion: Global Force Wrestling; Impact Wrestling
- Date established: October 23, 2015
- Date retired: July 2, 2017 (unified with the Impact World Tag Team Championship)
Statistics
- First champions: The Bollywood Boyz (Gurv Sihra and Harv Sihra)
- Final champions: The Latin American Xchange (Santana and Ortiz)
- Most reigns: All titleholders (1 reign)
- Longest reign: The Bollywood Boyz (Gurv Sihra and Harv Sihra) (406 days)
- Shortest reign: The Latin American Xchange (Santana and Ortiz) (70 days)
- Oldest champion: Gurv Sihra (30 years, 344 days)
- Youngest champion: Harv Sihra (27 years, 355 days)
- Heaviest champion: The Latin American Xchange (Santana and Ortiz) (389lbs (176kg))
- Lightest champion: The Bollywood Boyz (Gurv Sihra and Harv Sihra) (303lbs (137kg))

Key
| No. | Overall reign number |
| Reign | Reign number for the specific champion |
| Days | Number of days held |

| No. | Champion | Championship change | | | Reign statistics | | Notes | Ref. |
| No. | Champion | Date | Event | Location | Reign | Days | Notes | Ref. |
|---|---|---|---|---|---|---|---|---|
| 1 | The Bollywood Boyz (Gurv Sihra and Harv Sihra) | October 23, 2015 | GFW Amped | Las Vegas, Nevada | 1 | 406 | Defeated Reno Scum to become the inaugural champions Aired on December 8, 2015 | |
| — | Vacated | December 2, 2016 | — | — | — | — | The titles were vacated due to The Bollywood Boyz signing with WWE. | |
| 2 | The Latin American Xchange (Santana and Ortiz) | April 23, 2017 | Impact Wrestling | Orlando, Florida | 1 | 70 | Defeated Veterans of War in a tournament finals to win the vacant titles. | |
| — | Unified | July 2, 2017 | Slammiversary XV | Orlando, Florida | — | — | The championships were unified with the Impact World Tag Team Championship after LAX defended both | |

=== Other championships used by GFW ===
| Promotion | Championship | Last GFW Champion | Reign | Notes |
|---|---|---|---|---|
| Total Nonstop Action Wrestling | TNA King of the Mountain Championship | P. J. Black | July 27, 2015 – July 28, 2015 | |
| Total Nonstop Action Wrestling | TNA World Tag Team Championship | Brian Myers and Trevor Lee | July 28, 2015 – July 29, 2015 | |
| OMEGA Championship Wrestling | OMEGA Heavyweight Championship | Trevor Lee | May 2, 2015 – November 21, 2015 | |

== See also ==
- List of Global Force Wrestling events and specials
- List of former Global Force Wrestling personnel
- List of Global Force Wrestling tournaments
