= Produce by Orange Crush =

American professional wrestling promotion

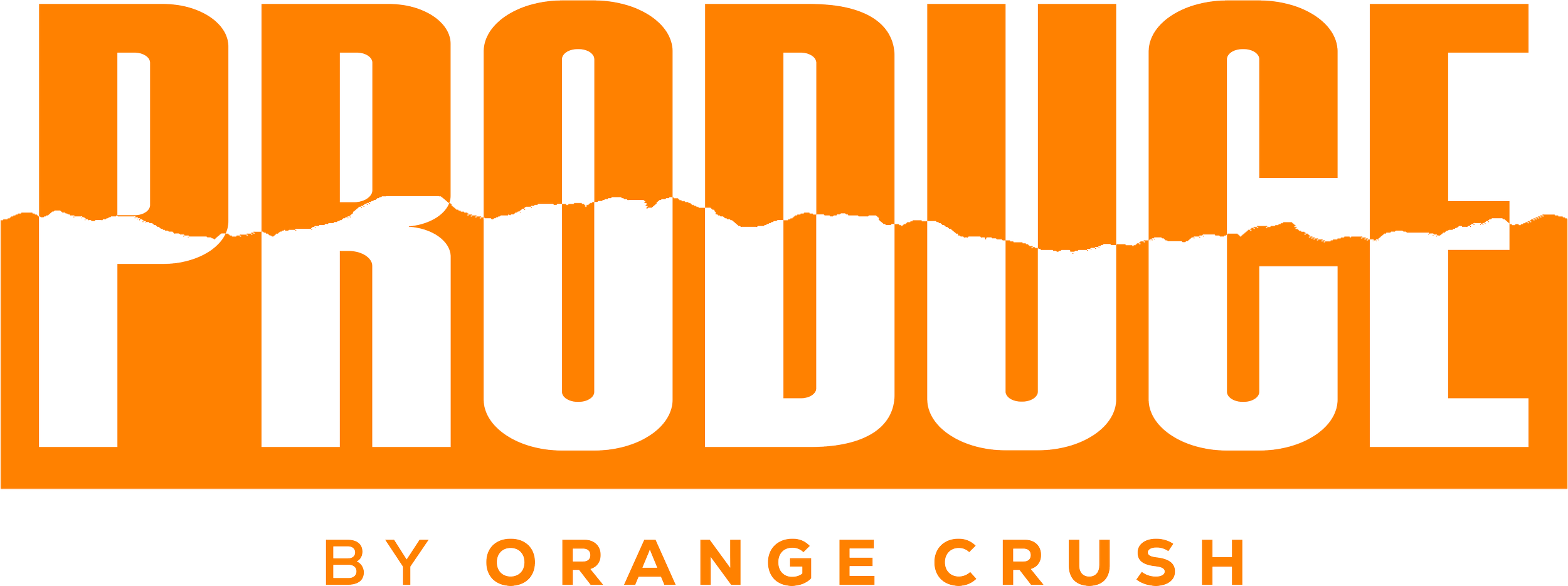
- Acronym: Produce
- Founded: 2026
- Style: American professional wrestling
- Headquarters: New York City, New York
- Founder: Adam Abdalla
- Owner: Adam Abdalla
- Parent: Orange Crush
- Website: https://www.producewrestling.com/

Produce by Orange Crush, also referred to as Produce Wrestling or simply Produce, is an American independent professional wrestling promotion based in New York City, New York. It is owned and operated by former booker of Game Changer Wrestling (GCW)'s Jersey Championship Wrestling (JCW) developmental division and owner of the Orange Crush art magazine, Adam Abdalla.

== History ==
In March 2026, Adam Abdalla announced the launch of Produce by Orange Crush with their first event being scheduled for June 29, 2026 at Pioneer Works in Brooklyn, New York. Several wrestlers were announced as part of the promotion's roster including Jonathan Gresham, Man Like Dereiss, Mance Warner, Steph De Lander, and Joey Janela, among others. On June 5, 2026, Produce announced that they had signed a pay-per-view distribution deal with MyAEW, a streaming service owned by All Elite Wrestling (AEW), which would begin with Produce Volume 1: The Octopus. On June 9, 2026, Produce announced a working relationship with World Wonder Ring Stardom (Stardom) in which several Stardom wrestlers would be used in several upcoming Produce events. On June 19, 2026, Produce announced a working relationship with Wrestling Revolver which would begin during Wrestling Revolver's The Silence of The Slams event in Nashville, Tennessee on July 24, 2026. Produce Volume 1: The Octopus featured several AEW, GCW, and WWE ID wrestlers on the card including a title defense of GCW's JCW World Championship in which Charles Mason retained the championship following a match with Amazing Red.

On July 1, 2026, it was announced that WWE ID wrestlers Marcus Mathers and Chazz "Starboy" Hall were pulled from Produce Volume 2: Taiga Style which took place on July 16, 2026 and that their future bookings with Produce were terminated as a result of WWE obligations. There was speculation that Mathers and Hall were pulled due to Produce's partnership with AEW but GCW owner Brett Lauderdale had denied the rumors and noted that there were going to be WWE Evolve tapings around the same weekend. However, Abdalla has claimed that WWE ID talent were allegedly conned into pulling off independent events to do "scabwork". On August 5, 2026, Joey Janela announced he and Megan Bayne had pulled themselves out of Produce's Volume 4 event on September 13, 2026 due to disputes with Adam Abdalla. One day later in an interview with Fightful, Janela accused Abdalla of pressuring Marcus Mathers into burning his WWE ID contract. On August 14, 2026, Produce owner Adam Abdalla was accused of "unsafe" and "predatory" sexual behavior toward women wrestlers and fans. In response, Abdalla announced via the Orange Crush Art X account on August 16, 2026, that he would "Hand off PRODUCE to a steadier hand".

On August 31, 2026, Produce announced that they would be launching a sister brand with Lucha Libre Promotions called Lucha Fresca with the first event taking place on September 18 in Poughkeepsie, New York. On November 2, 2026, Produce announced that it would be going on a hiatus due to financial difficulties.
