= Capital City Championship Combat =

- Acronym: C4
- Founded: 2007
- Style: Professional wrestling
- Headquarters: Ottawa, Ontario, Canada
- Founder: Mark Pollesel
- Owner: Mark Pollesel
- Website: c4wrestling.com

Capital City Championship Combat (C4) is a Canadian independent professional wrestling promotion located in Ottawa, Ontario.

== History ==
On June 6, 2009, C4 crowned its first champion when Kevin Steen won the title in a C4 Championship tournament final four corner survival match during the promotion's Crossing The Line II event.

On August 11, 2025, C4 partnered with Fighting Back: Wrestling With Cancer, the Canadian Cancer Society, and Mystery Wrestling to present "The World's Longest Wrestling Match", a live-streamed professional wrestling event held in support of cancer research and fundraising initiatives at Centre Adelyu in Gatineau, Quebec. The match lasted 21 hours, 49 minutes and 12 seconds and featured multiple wrestlers rotating throughout the match. According to reports, the event raised more than $30,000 for the Canadian Cancer Society. The event received coverage from several media outlets, including Fightful and POST Wrestling. This match set the record for longest professional wrestling match.

The event was held again in June 2026. Once again, the match broke the record for longest professional wrestling match; this time, it lasted 21 hours, 58 minutes, and 49 seconds.

On June 16, 2026, C4 announced that their content would be added to the MyAEW streaming service.

On August 15, 2026, C4 held the 15th annual Fighting Back event which featured MLP Interim Canadian Champion Stu Grayson, Mystery Wrestling owner Evil Uno, Ortiz, and former ROH World Six Man Tag Team Champion Dalton Castle. AEW wrestler Eddie Kingston was initially scheduled to be booked for the event but he had pulled out on August 14, 2026.

== Championships ==
Championship	Current Champion(s)	Date won	Days held	Event	Location	Notes
C4 Championship	Sheldon Jean	March 13, 2026	241+	Blade in the Dark	Ottawa, Ontario, Canada	
C4 Tag Team Championship	Northern Thunder (London Lightning and Storm Ryder)	August 14, 2026	87+	Fighting Back 15: Wrestling With Cancer	Ottawa, Ontario, Canada	
C4 Underground Championship	Vaughn Vertigo	March 30, 2026	224+	The Big Chill	Ottawa, Ontario, Canada	
C4 Women's Championship	Kristara	September 18, 2026	52+	For the Love of the Game	Ottawa, Ontario, Canada	
