= WrestleCade =

Professional wrestling fan convention

- Status: Active
- Frequency: Annual
- Venue: Benton Convention Center
- Location: Winston-Salem, North Carolina
- Country: United States
- Founded: 2012
- Founder: Tracy Myers
- Organizer: WrestleCade Entertainment
- Website: http://www.wrestlecade.com/

WrestleCade, also referred to as WrestleCade Weekend, is an annual professional wrestling fan convention organized by WrestleCade Entertainment which also owns America's Most Liked Wrestling (AML Wrestling). The convention has been held at the Benton Convention Center in Winston-Salem, North Carolina since its inaugural event in 2012. Also known as being one of the largest events on the independent circuit, it has set several attendance records since 2014.

== Event history ==
Date(s)	Venue	City	Guests	Promotions	Notes
November 25, 2012	Benton Convention Center	Winston-Salem, North Carolina		WrestleCade	
November 30 2013	Benton Convention Center	Winston-Salem, North Carolina		WrestleCade	
November 29, 2014	Benton Convention Center	Winston-Salem, North Carolina	Scott Steiner, Rick Steiner, Vader, Sunny, Debra McMichael, Stevie Richards, Blue Meanie, Super Nova, Ted DiBiase, Ron Bass, Ricky Morton, Robert Gibson, Jim Cornette,	WrestleCade	Also featured a roast of Jim Cornette
November 27-28, 2015	Benton Convention Center	Winston-Salem, North Carolina	Stan Hansen, Bobby Heenan, Kevin Nash, Ricky Steamboat, Booker T, Stevie Ray, Brian Knobbs, George South, Jimmy Valiant	WrestleCade	First multi-day WrestleCade convention
November 25-27, 2016	Benton Convention Center	Winston-Salem, North Carolina		WrestleCade	
November 25-27, 2017	Benton Convention Center	Winston-Salem, North Carolina		WrestleCade; AML; QOC	
November 23-25, 2018	Benton Convention Center	Winston-Salem, North Carolina		WrestleCade; AML; QOC	
November 29-December 1, 2019	Benton Convention Center	Winston-Salem, North Carolina		WrestleCade; AML; QOC	
November 26–28, 2021	Benton Convention Center	Winston-Salem, North Carolina		WrestleCade; AML; TMN	
November 25-27, 2022	Benton Convention Center	Winston-Salem, North Carolina		WrestleCade; AML; TMN; IPWF (Impact)	
November 24-26, 2023	Benton Convention Center	Winston-Salem, North Carolina		WrestleCade; AML; TMN; GCW	
November 29–December 1, 2024	Benton Convention Center	Winston-Salem, North Carolina		WrestleCade; AML; TMN; TNA	
November 28–30, 2025	Benton Convention Center	Winston-Salem, North Carolina		WrestleCade; AML; TMN; 4th Rope	

== Wrestling shows ==
=== 2012 ===
Event	Promotion	Date	Venue	City	Main event	Notes
WrestleCade	WrestleCade	November 25	Benton Convention Center	Winston-Salem, North Carolina	Matt Hardy vs. Gunner in a 30-minute Iron Man match	
(c) – refers to the champion(s) heading into the match

=== 2013 ===
Event	Promotion	Date	Venue	City	Main event	Notes
WrestleCade	WrestleCade	November 30	Benton Convention Center	Winston-Salem, North Carolina	Carlito (c) (with Jonny Fairplay) vs. Matt Hardy (with Reby Sky) in a Ladder match for the WrestleCade Championship	First WrestleCade show to be aired on pay-per-view
(c) – refers to the champion(s) heading into the match

=== 2014 ===
Event	Promotion	Date	Venue	City	Main event	Notes
WrestleCade	WrestleCade	November 29	Benton Convention Center	Winston-Salem, North Carolina	Matt Hardy (c) defeats Drew Galloway (with Jonny Fairplay) in a Last Man Standing match for the WrestleCade Championship	Highest attended independent event in North America for 2014.
(c) – refers to the champion(s) heading into the match

=== 2015 ===
Event	Promotion	Date	Venue	City	Main event	Notes
1st Annual Showcase Of Champions	WrestleCade	November 27	Benton Convention Center	Winston-Salem, North Carolina	Caprice Coleman (c) vs. Papadon vs. Ethan Carter III in a 3-way match for the AML Championship	
WrestleCade	WrestleCade	November 28	Benton Convention Center	Winston-Salem, North Carolina	Matt Hardy (c) vs. Jeff Jarrett (with Karen Jarrett) for the WrestleCade Championship	
(c) – refers to the champion(s) heading into the match

=== 2016 ===
Event	Promotion	Date	Venue	City	Main event	Notes
2nd Annual Showcase of Champions	WrestleCade	November 25	Benton Convention Center	Winston-Salem, North Carolina	Sonjay Dutt (c) vs. Cody Rhodes for the GFW NEX*GEN Championship	
AML TV taping	AML	November 26	Benton Convention Center	Winston-Salem, North Carolina	Shane Williams (c) vs. Damien Wayne vs. Zane Dawson in a 3-way Lumberjack match for the AML Championship	
WrestleCade: The Final 3 Count	WrestleCade	November 26	Benton Convention Center	Winston-Salem, North Carolina	Matt Hardy (c) vs. Ryback for the WrestleCade Championship	
Queens of Combat 16	QOC	November 27	Benton Convention Center	Winston-Salem, North Carolina	Taeler Hendrix (c) vs. Su Yung for the QOC Championship	
(c) – refers to the champion(s) heading into the match

=== 2017 ===
Event	Promotion	Date	Venue	City	Main event	Notes
3rd Annual Showcase of Champions	WrestleCade	November 24	Benton Convention Center	Winston-Salem, North Carolina	Jason Kincaid (c) vs. Chet Sterling (with J.J. Dillon) vs. Andrew Everett vs. Rey Fenix in a 4-way match for the MVW Heavyweight Championship	
Wrestlecade Fanfest	WrestleCade; AML	November 25	Benton Convention Center	Winston-Salem, North Carolina	Zane Dawson (c) vs. White Mike for the AML Championship	
WrestleCade SuperShow	WrestleCade	November 25	Benton Convention Center	Winston-Salem, North Carolina	Eli Drake (c) vs. Jack Swagger (with Catalina Swagger and Dutch Mantel) vs. Johnny Impact in a 3-way match for the Impact Global Championship	
The Day After	AML	November 26	Benton Convention Center	Winston-Salem, North Carolina	Zane Dawson vs. Caleb Konley in a Lumberjack match for the AML Championship	
Queens of Combat Super Show	QOC	November 26	Benton Convention Center	Winston-Salem, North Carolina	Su Yung (c) vs. Mickie Knuckles vs. Samantha Heights in a 3-way match for the QOC Championship	
(c) – refers to the champion(s) heading into the match

=== 2018 ===
Event	Promotion	Date	Venue	City	Main event	Notes
4th Annual Showcase of Champions	WrestleCade	November 23	Benton Convention Center	Winston-Salem, North Carolina	Caleb Konley (c) vs. PJ Black for the AML Championship	
WrestleCade SuperShow	WrestleCade	November 24	Benton Convention Center	Winston-Salem, North Carolina	Nick Aldis (c) (with Kamilla Kaine) vs. Jake Hager (with Catalina Swagger) for the NWA Worlds Heavyweight Championship	
Queens of Combat 28: In Your Palace	QOC	November 25	Benton Convention Center	Winston-Salem, North Carolina	Su Yung (c) vs. Diamante for the QOC Championship	
The Day After	AML	November 25	Benton Convention Center	Winston-Salem, North Carolina	Caleb Konley (c) vs. George South for the AML Championship	
(c) – refers to the champion(s) heading into the match

=== 2019 ===
Event	Promotion	Date	Venue	City	Main event	Notes
5th Annual Showcase of Champions	WrestleCade	November 29	Benton Convention Center	Winston-Salem, North Carolina	Rich Swann (c) vs. Matt Cross for the NGW Championship	
WrestleCade SuperShow	WrestleCade	November 30	Benton Convention Center	Winston-Salem, North Carolina	Nick Aldis and The Rock 'n' Roll Express (Ricky Morton and Robert Gibson) vs. Thomas Latimer and The Latin American Exchange (Hernandez and Homicide)	
Queens of Combat 39: In Your Palace 2	QOC	December 1	Benton Convention Center	Winston-Salem, North Carolina	Diamante (c) vs. La Rosa Negra for the QOC Championship	
The Day After	AML	December 1	Benton Convention Center	Winston-Salem, North Carolina	Nick Aldis (c) vs. Shane Williams for the NWA Worlds Heavyweight Championship	
(c) – refers to the champion(s) heading into the match

=== 2021 ===
Event	Promotion	Date	Venue	City	Main event	Notes
6th Annual Showcase of Champions	WrestleCade	November 26	Benton Convention Center	Winston-Salem, North Carolina	Shane Taylor Promotions (Shane Taylor, Kaun and Moses) (c) vs. Caprice Coleman, TIM and Zuka King for the ROH World Six Man Tag Team Championship	
WrestleCade SuperShow	WrestleCade	November 27	Benton Convention Center	Winston-Salem, North Carolina	Malakai Black vs. Buddy Matthews	
Ladies Night Out 11	TMN	November 28	Benton Convention Center	Winston-Salem, North Carolina	Ivelisse (c) vs. Chelsea Green for the Ladies Night Out Championship	
The Day After	AML	November 28	Benton Convention Center	Winston-Salem, North Carolina	Caprice Coleman (c) vs. Davey Richards for the AML Championship	
(c) – refers to the champion(s) heading into the match

=== 2022 ===
Event	Promotion	Date	Venue	City	Main event	Notes
Throwback Throwdown III	IPWF (Impact Wrestling)	November 25	Benton Convention Center	Winston-Salem, North Carolina	Team Impact Provincial Wrestling Federation ("Cowboy" Colt McCoy, Tim Burr, Frank the Butcher and Giuseppe Scovelli Jr.) vs. Team Great Lakes Unionized Wrestling (Devon Damon, Neptune, Lord Humongous) and Manfred The Mad Mammal) in an eight-man elimination tag team match	
WrestleCade SuperShow	WrestleCade	November 26	Benton Convention Center	Winston-Salem, North Carolina	The Briscoes (Jay Briscoe and Mark Briscoe) vs. The Kingdom (Matt Taven and Michael Bennett) (with Maria Kanellis)	
Ladies Night Out 12	TMN	November 27	Benton Convention Center	Winston-Salem, North Carolina	Ivelisse (with Charlette Renegade and Robyn Renegade) (c) vs. Janai Kai for the Ladies Night Out Championship	
The Day After	AML	November 27	Benton Convention Center	Winston-Salem, North Carolina	Nick Gage (c) vs. George South for the GCW World Championship	
(c) – refers to the champion(s) heading into the match

=== 2023 ===
Event	Promotion	Date	Venue	City	Main event	Notes
GCW at WrestleCade Weekend	GCW	November 24	Benton Convention Center	Winston-Salem, North Carolina	Blake Christian (c) vs. Billie Starkz for the GCW World Championship	
WrestleCade SuperShow	WrestleCade	November 25	Benton Convention Center	Winston-Salem, North Carolina	The Hardys (Matt Hardy and Jeff Hardy) vs. Heath and Rhino	
Ladies Night Out 12	TMN	November 26	Benton Convention Center	Winston-Salem, North Carolina	Angelica Risk (c) vs. Renee Michelle for the Ladies Night Out Championship with La Rosa Negra as special guest referee	
The Day After	AML	November 26	Benton Convention Center	Winston-Salem, North Carolina	Brad Attitude (c) vs. Axton Ray vs. Billy Brash vs. CW Anderson in a 4-way match for the AML Championship	
(c) – refers to the champion(s) heading into the match

=== 2024 ===
Event	Promotion	Date	Venue	City	Main event	Notes
Turning Point	TNA	November 24	Benton Convention Center	Winston-Salem, North Carolina	Nic Nemeth (c) vs. Eddie Edwards (with Alisha Edwards) for the TNA World Championship	
WrestleCade SuperShow	WrestleCade	November 25	Benton Convention Center	Winston-Salem, North Carolina	Shelton Benjamin vs. Mike Bailey	
Ladies Night Out 14	TMN	November 26	Benton Convention Center	Winston-Salem, North Carolina	Angelica Risk (c-LNO) vs. Jazmin Allure (c-HP) in a Champion vs. Champion match for the Ladies Night Out Championship and Hurricane Pro Women's Championship	
The Day After	AML	November 26	Benton Convention Center	Winston-Salem, North Carolina	Brad Attitude (c) vs. Gustavo for the AML Championship	
(c) – refers to the champion(s) heading into the match

=== 2025 ===
Event	Promotion	Date	Venue	City	Main event	Notes
4th Rope Invades WrestleCade	4th Rope	November 28	Benton Convention Center	Winston-Salem, North Carolina	Zilla Fatu and The Hardys (Matt Hardy and Jeff Hardy) vs. Josh Bishop and The Good Brothers (Karl Anderson and Luke Gallows)	
WrestleCade SuperShow	WrestleCade	November 29	Benton Convention Center	Winston-Salem, North Carolina	The Hardys (Matt Hardy and Jeff Hardy) (with D-Von Dudley) vs. The Rascalz (Dezmond Xavier and Zachary Wentz)	
Ladies Night Out 15	TMN	November 30	Benton Convention Center	Winston-Salem, North Carolina	Shotzi Blackheart (with Black Dahlia) vs. Priscilla Kelly in a Last Woman Standing match	
The Day After	AML	November 30	Benton Convention Center	Winston-Salem, North Carolina	George South vs. Joey Janela in a Casket match	
(c) – refers to the champion(s) heading into the match

=== 2026 ===
Event	Promotion	Date	Venue	City	Main event	Notes
MATW TV taping	MATW	November 27	Benton Convention Center	Winston-Salem, North Carolina		
Rising	1FW	November 27	Benton Convention Center	Winston-Salem, North Carolina		
Heels	4th Rope	November 27	Benton Convention Center	Winston-Salem, North Carolina		
WrestleCade SuperShow	WrestleCade	November 28	Benton Convention Center	Winston-Salem, North Carolina		
Live for the Moment	DCW	November 29	Benton Convention Center	Winston-Salem, North Carolina		
The Day After	AML	November 29	Benton Convention Center	Winston-Salem, North Carolina		
(c) – refers to the champion(s) heading into the match
