= America's Most Liked Wrestling =

American independent professional wrestling promotion

- Acronym: AML
- Founded: 2014
- Style: Professional wrestling
- Headquarters: Winston-Salem, North Carolina
- Founder: Tracy Myers
- Owner(s): Tracy Myers; Brian Hawks
- Website: amlwrestling.com

America's Most Liked Wrestling (AML) is an American independent professional wrestling promotion founded by Tracy Myers who co-owns the promotion alongside Brian Hawks. Myers also owns the WrestleCade convention which AML also holds events at.

== History ==
On January 25, 2015, America's Most Liked Wrestling held its first event at the AML Arena in Winston-Salem, North Carolina with the main event being Matt Hardy defending the WrestleCade Championship against X-Pac and Zane Dawson. During the Confrontation event on April 19, 2015, AML held the first rounds of a tournament to crown the inaugural AML Champion.

The first AML champion was crowned when Caprice Coleman defeated Shane Williams, Vordell Walker, and Zane Dawson in a four-way match during the Live to Win event on May 24, 2015. On November 26, 2016, AML held their first event at the WrestleCade convention with the event serving as a taping for AML's weekly television show. On November 27, 2022 during the Day After event at WrestleCade, Nick Gage defended the GCW World Championship against George South in the main event.

On January 25, 2025 during the Acts of War Games 4 event, WWE Hall of Famer John Layfield, made a surprise appearance and had clotheslined Reyhan Inteus. On July 30, 2026, All Elite Wrestling announced that AML would be adding their content to the MyAEW streaming service.

== Championships ==
Championship	Current champion(s)	Date won	Days held	Event	Location	Notes
AML Championship	Billy Brash	June 28, 2026	143+	Giant Among Men	Winston-Salem, North Carolina	
Future Stars of AML Wrestling Championship	James Ryan	October 6, 2023	1,139+	The Future Stars of AML Wrestling	Winston-Salem, North Carolina	
AML Prestige Championship	Jacari Ball	June 28, 2026	143+	Giant Among Men	Winston-Salem, North Carolina	
AML Tag Team Championship	The Dawsons (Dave Dawson and Zane Dawson)	June 28, 2026	263+	Giant Among Men	Winston-Salem, North Carolina	
