= List of former Global Force Wrestling personnel =

This is a list of former employees of the professional wrestling promotion Global Force Wrestling. Global Force Wrestling was founded in 2014 but began holding events in 2015. All wrestlers listed competed in the original incarnation of GFW.

== Alumni ==
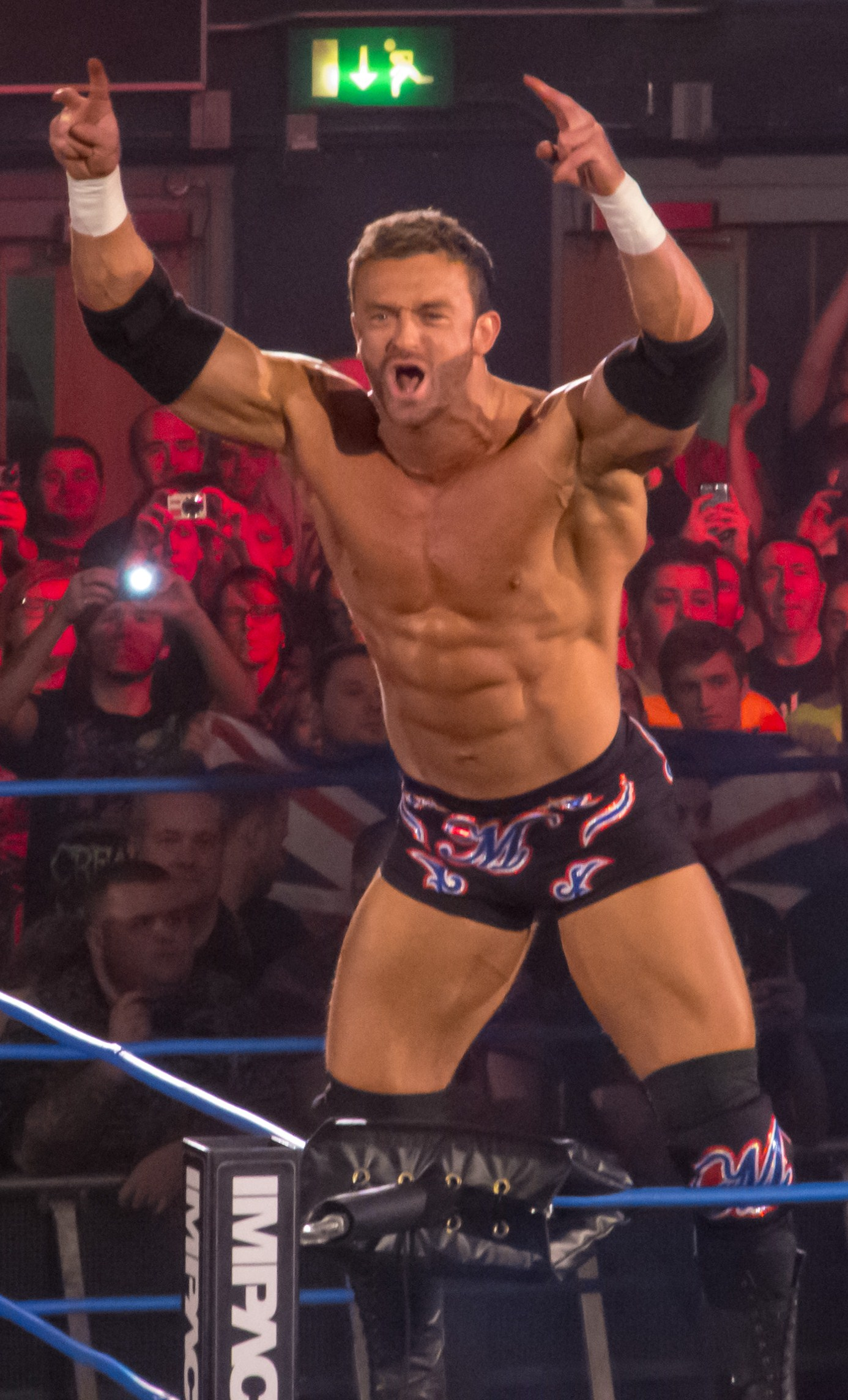
Nick Aldis

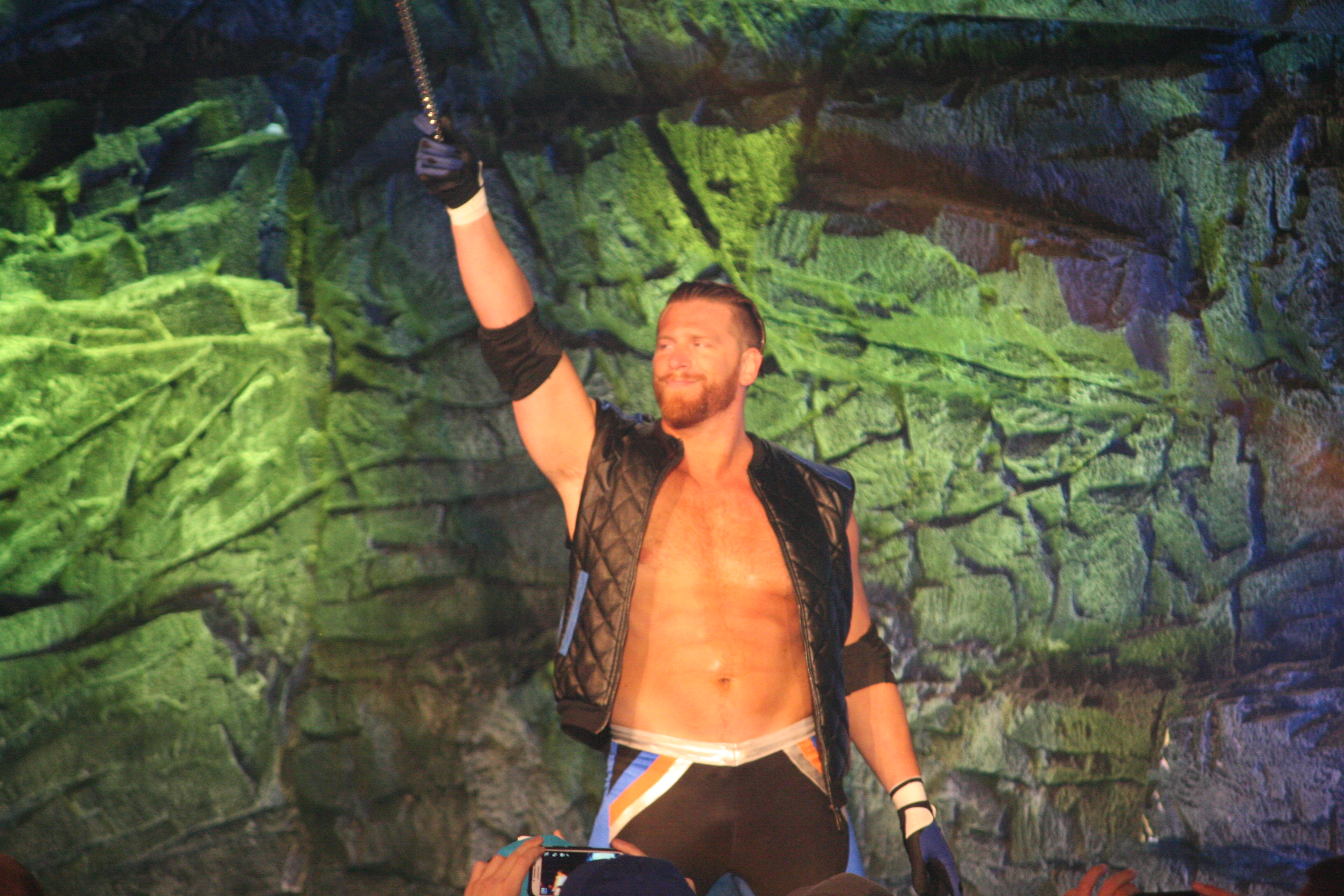
Brian Myers

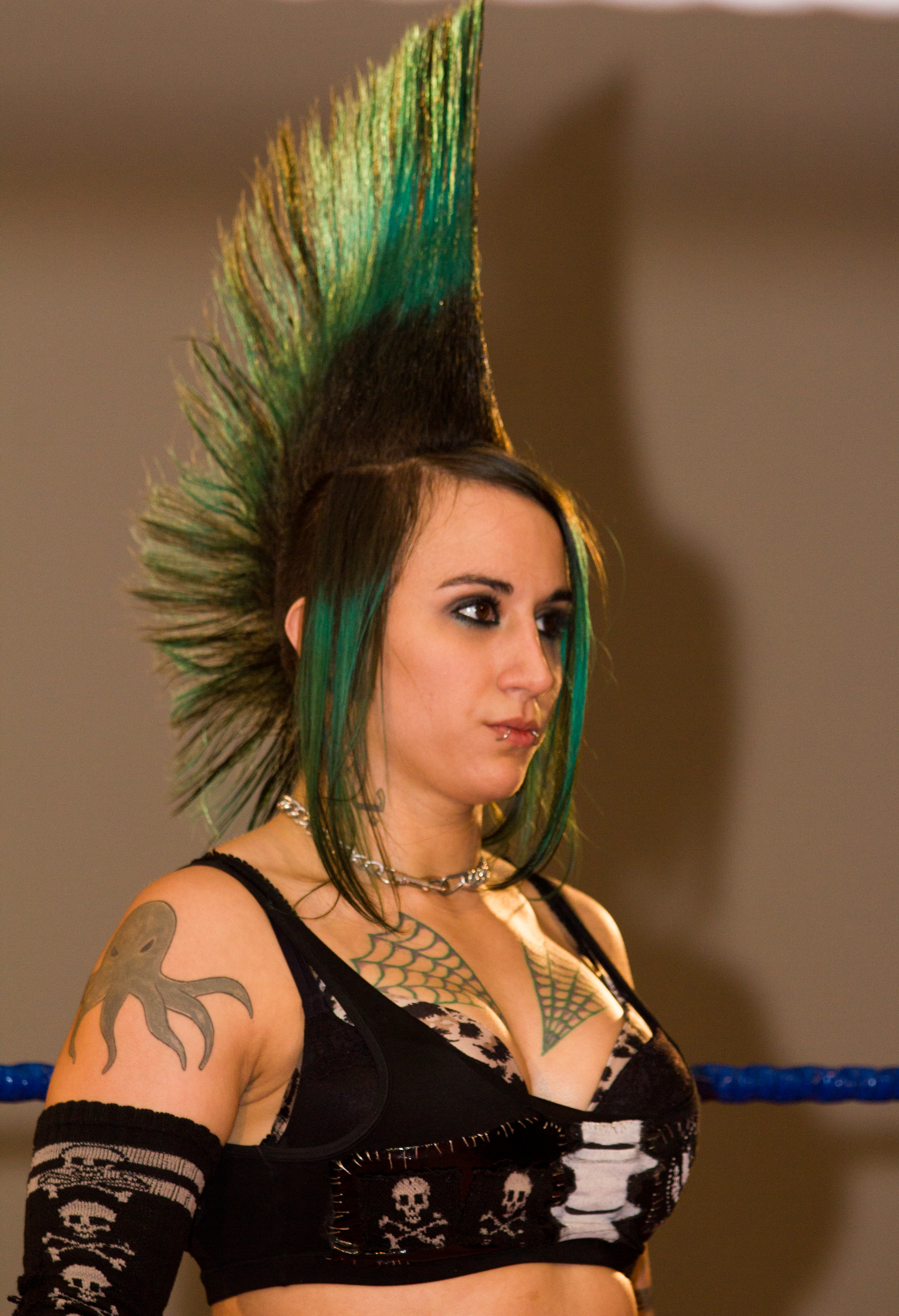
Christina Von Eerie

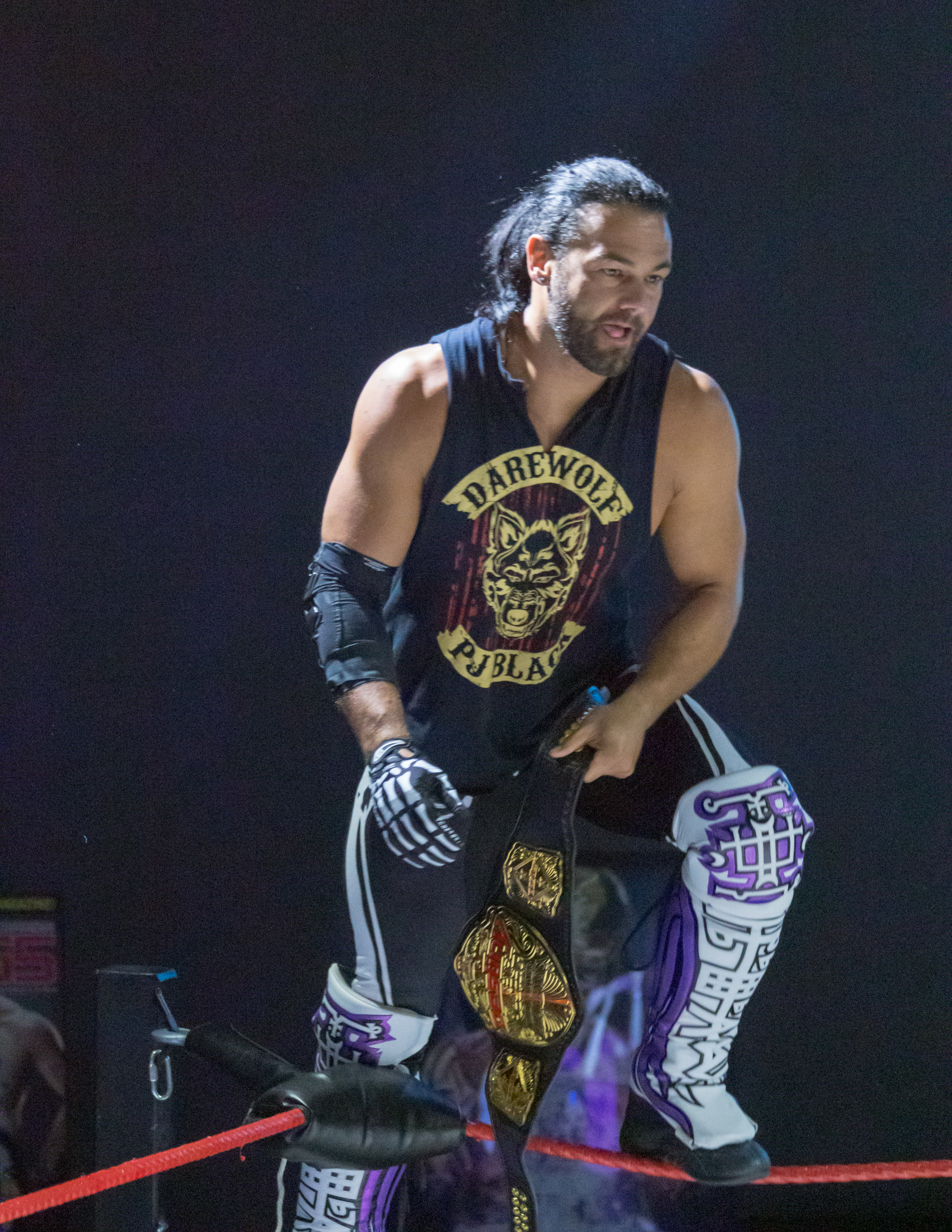
PJ Black

Deceased individuals are indicated with a dagger (†).

| Ring name: | Birth name(s): | Tenure(s): | References |
|---|---|---|---|
| Adam Thornstowe | Adam DeBoor | 2015–2017 | |
| Ali Akbar | Ali Vaez | 2015 | |
| Amber Gallows | Kimberly Hankinson | 2015 | |
| Ariya Daivari | Ariya Daivari | 2015 | |
| Bestia 666 | Leornardo Lizarraga | 2015 | |
| Brian Myers | Brian Myers | 2015 | |
| Bobby Roode | Robert Roode Jr. | 2015 | |
| Chael Sonnen | Chael Sonnen | 2015 | |
| Chris Mordetzky | Chris Mordetzky | 2015–2017 | |
| Christina Von Eerie | Christina Kardooni | 2015–2017 | |
| Chuck Taylor | Dustin Howard | 2015 | |
| Cielo/Cielo Escorpion | Schuyler Andrews | 2015 | |
| Cody Rhodes | Cody Runnels | 2016–2017 | |
| Colt Cabana | Scott Colton | 2015–2017 | |
| Cyrus Fees | Cyrus Fees | 2015 | |
| Davey Boy Smith Jr. | Harry Smith | 2015 | |
| DJ Z | Michael Paris | 2015 | |
| Doc Gallows | Andrew Hankinson | 2015 | |
| Doug Williams | Douglas Durdle | 2015 | |
| Eric Young | Jeremy Frit | 2015 | |
| Gurv Sihra | Gurv Sihra | 2015–2016 | |
| Harv Sihra | Harv Shira | 2015–2016 | |
| Jamin Olivencia | Jamin Olivencia | 2015 | |
| Jeff Jarrett | Jeffery Jarrett | 2014–2017 | |
| Jigsaw | Edward McGuckin | 2015 | |
| Juicy Joey | Joseph Meehan | 2015 | |
| Johnny Gargano | John Gargano | 2015 | |
| Jon Bolen | Jon Bolen | 2015 | |
| JR Kratos | Unknown | 2015 | |
| Karl Anderson | Chad Allegra | 2015 | |
| Karen Jarrett | Karen Jarrett | 2014–2017 | |
| Katarina Leigh | Katarina Waters | 2015 | |
| Kenny King | Kenny Layne | 2015 | |
| Kevin Kross | Kevin Kross | 2015 | |
| Kongo Kong | Steven Wilson | 2015–2017 | |
| Kushida | Yujiro Kushida | 2015 | |
| Lance Hoyt | Lance Hoyt | 2015 | |
| Laura James | Laura James | 2015 | |
| Lei'D Tapa | Seini Draughn | 2015 | |
| Luster The Legend | David Luster | 2015–2017 | |
| Matt Bentley | Matthew Bentley | 2015 | |
| Mickie James | Mickie James-Aldis | 2015–2016 | |
| Misterioso Jr. | Unknown | 2015 | |
| Moose | Quinn Ojinnaka | 2015 | |
| Nick Aldis | Nick Aldis | 2015–2017 | |
| ODB | Jessica Kresa | 2015 | |
| Omar Akbar | Khalil Gaspard | 2015 | |
| Phoenix Star | Unknown | 2015 | |
| PJ Black | Paul Lloyd | 2015 | |
| Scott Steiner | Scott Rechsteiner | 2015 | |
| Shelton Benjamin | Shelton Benjamin | 2015 | |
| Seiya Sanada | Seiya Sanada | 2015 | |
| Sonjay Dutt | Retesh Bhalla | 2015–2017 | |
| Takaaki Watanabe | Takaaki Watanabe | 2015 | |
| Tessa Blanchard | Tessa Blanchard | 2015 | |
| Virgil Flynn | Virgil Flynn† | 2015 | |
| Zokre | Unknown | 2015 | |

== See also ==
- Global Force Wrestling
