= Evil Uno =

Canadian professional wrestler

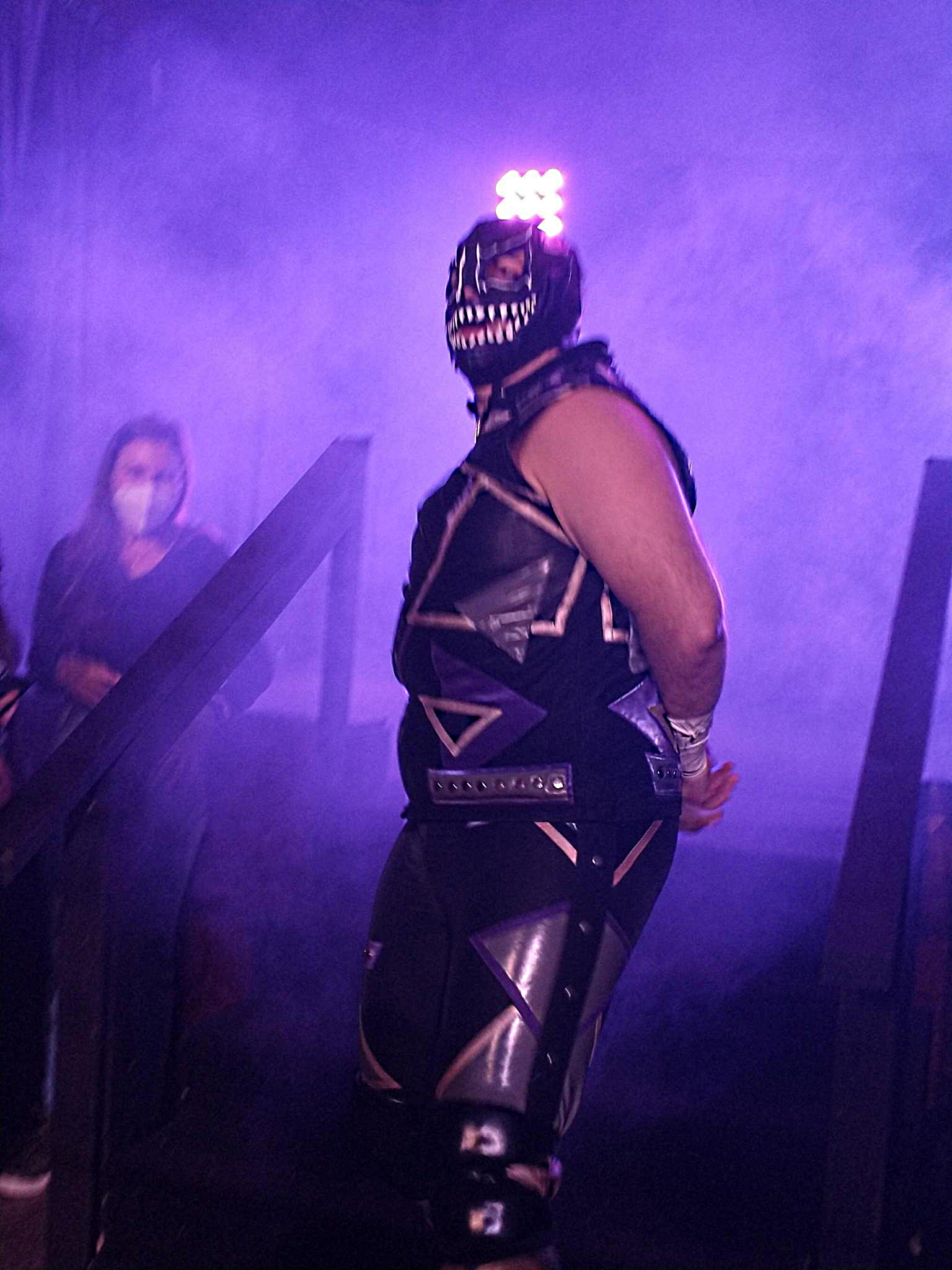
- Uno in March 2022

Personal information
- Born: Nicolas Dansereau; July 20, 1987 (age 39) Gatineau, Quebec, Canada

Professional wrestling career
- Ring name(s): El Popo; Evil Uno; Flip D. Berger; Player Uno; Dash Bison; Shitty; Berger
- Billed height: 6 ft 0 in (1.83 m)
- Billed weight: 229 lb (104 kg)
- Billed from: The Keep; The Mushroom Kingdom
- Trained by: Crusher Kline; Rick Sterling; Tommy Blade
- Debut: January 17, 2004

Nicolas Dansereau (born July 20, 1987), better known by the ring name Evil Uno, is a Canadian professional wrestler and promoter. He is the co-founder of Mystery Wrestling. He is signed to All Elite Wrestling (AEW), where he is a member of The Dark Order.

Formerly known as Player Uno, he regularly teamed with Stu Grayson as the Super Smash Brothers for various independent promotions across North America, including Alpha-1 Wrestling, Capital City Championship Combat (C*4), Inter Species Wrestling (ISW), and California-based Pro Wrestling Guerrilla (PWG). Together, they are former one-time Chikara Campeones de Parejas, one-time PWG World Tag Team Champions and winners of PWG's 2012 Dynamite Duumvirate Tag Team Title Tournament.

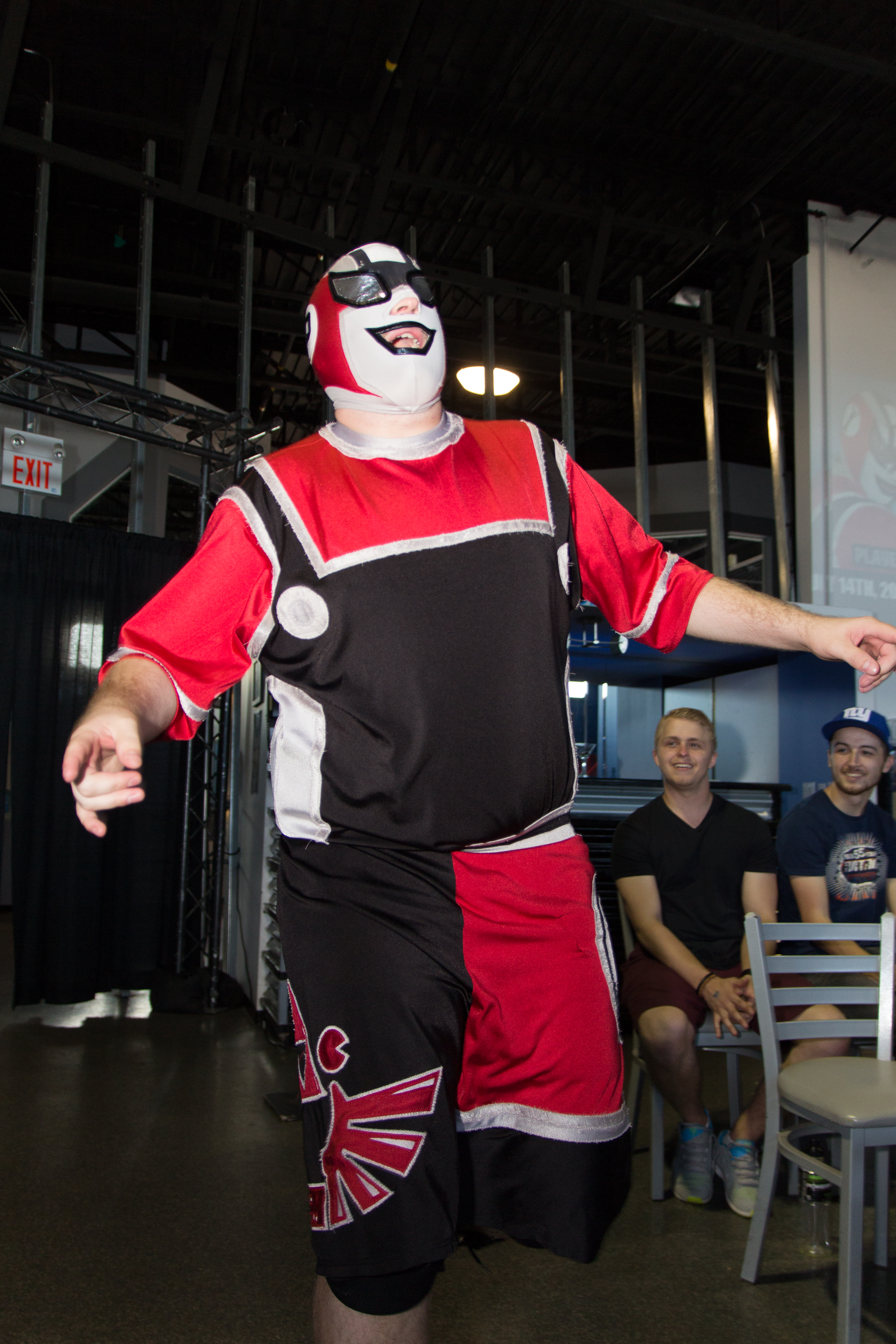
Player Uno making his ring entrance in July 2013

== Career ==
=== Early career ===
Dansereau first began wrestling at the age of 14. At the time, he went under the name "El PoPo". On an episode of Colt Cabana's podcast, The Art of Wrestling, he explained that the decision to change his name came, when El Generico wanted to be called Player 1. Uno changed it around and picked the name Uno. He originally planned to learn Spanish after choosing the name.

=== International Wrestling Syndicate ===
Uno made his debut in the Canadian wrestling promotion International Wrestling Syndicate (IWS). Uno quickly found a tag team partner in Stupefied as the Super Smash Brothers. The team found success as they soon won the IWS Tag Team Championship. Uno also found success as a singles competitor as he also won the IWS Canadian Championship. He remained with the promotion until it folded on October 9, 2010.

=== Chikara (2007–2010) ===
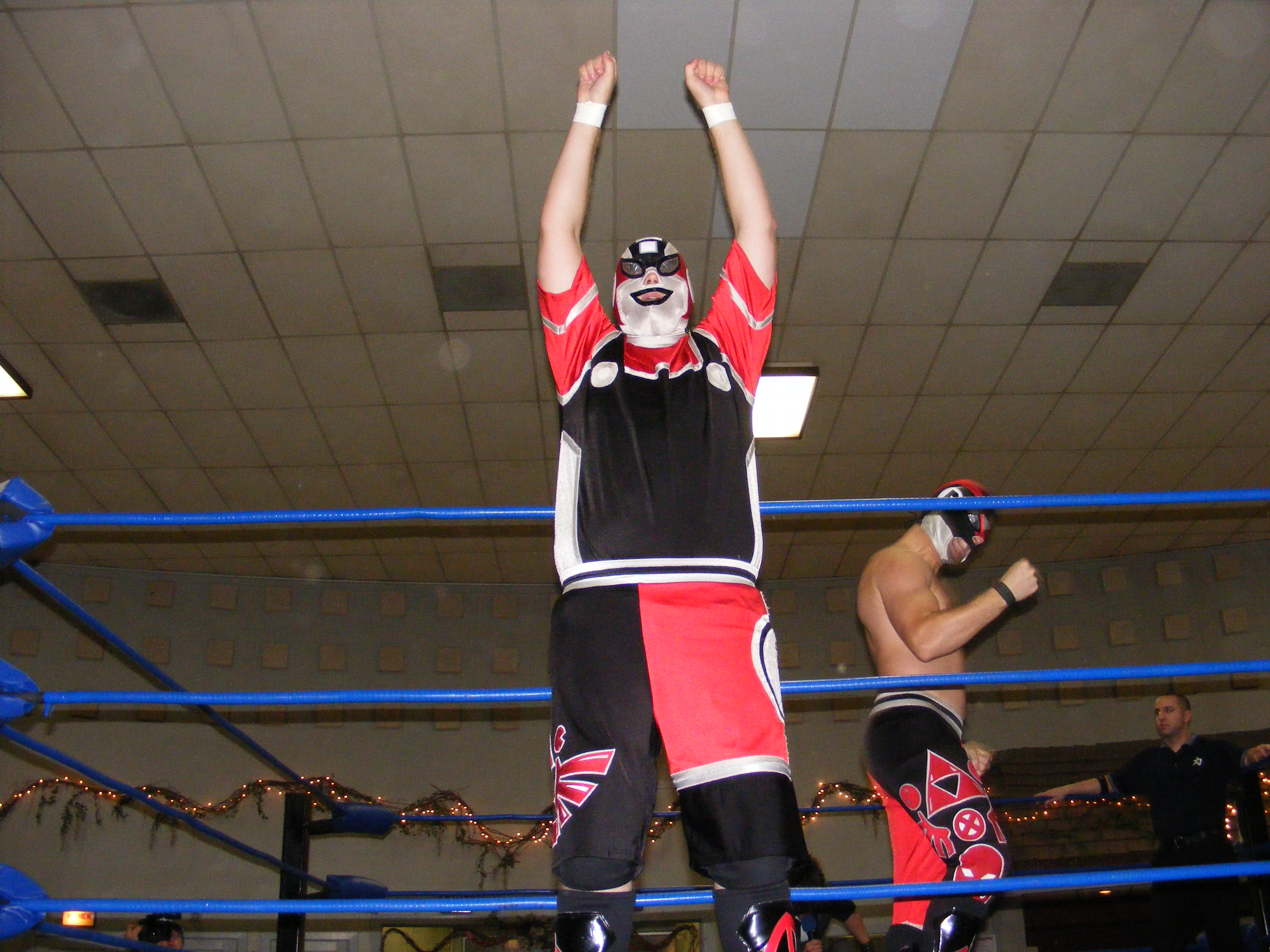
The Super Smash Bros. in August 2010

In 2007, the team started competing in Chikara. Uno and Stupefied, now competing as Player Dos and naming their team the Super Smash Brothers, won the Chikara Campeonatos de Parejas from Incoherence (Delirious and Hallowicked) at Laying in the Gutters, Looking at the Stars on September 21, 2008. The team only held the titles for a month before losing it to The Osirian Portal, the team of Amasis and Ophidian, at Global Gauntlet: Night 2. In 2009 Uno went on a long losing streak, which included a loss against Player Dos for the Young Lions Cup, but the streak came to an end at the season finale, when he debuted his new finishing maneuver The Joystick and forced Tim Donst to tap out with it. On October 24, 2010 Uno wrestled to date his last Chikara match with Dos with Sara Del Rey and Daizee Haze, which Uno and Dos lost.

=== Ring of Honor (2009–2010, 2018, 2023-present) ===
Uno, along with Player Dos, made his ROH debut on May 8, 2009 in Boston, MA, in a losing effort against Rhett Titus and Kenny King. On July 25 in Toronto, Ontario, at Death Before Dishonor VII Night 2 they scored an upset victory over former ROH World Tag Team Champions Kevin Steen and El Generico. On the November 9 episode of Ring of Honor Wrestling on HDNet, Uno and Dos debuted on the show in a return match, where they were defeated by Steen and Generico.

Uno later appeared for Ring of Honor on May 11, 2018, at the War of the Worlds event in Toronto, Canada when the Super Smash Brothers faced the Young Bucks in a losing effort.

=== Dragon Gate USA (2012) ===
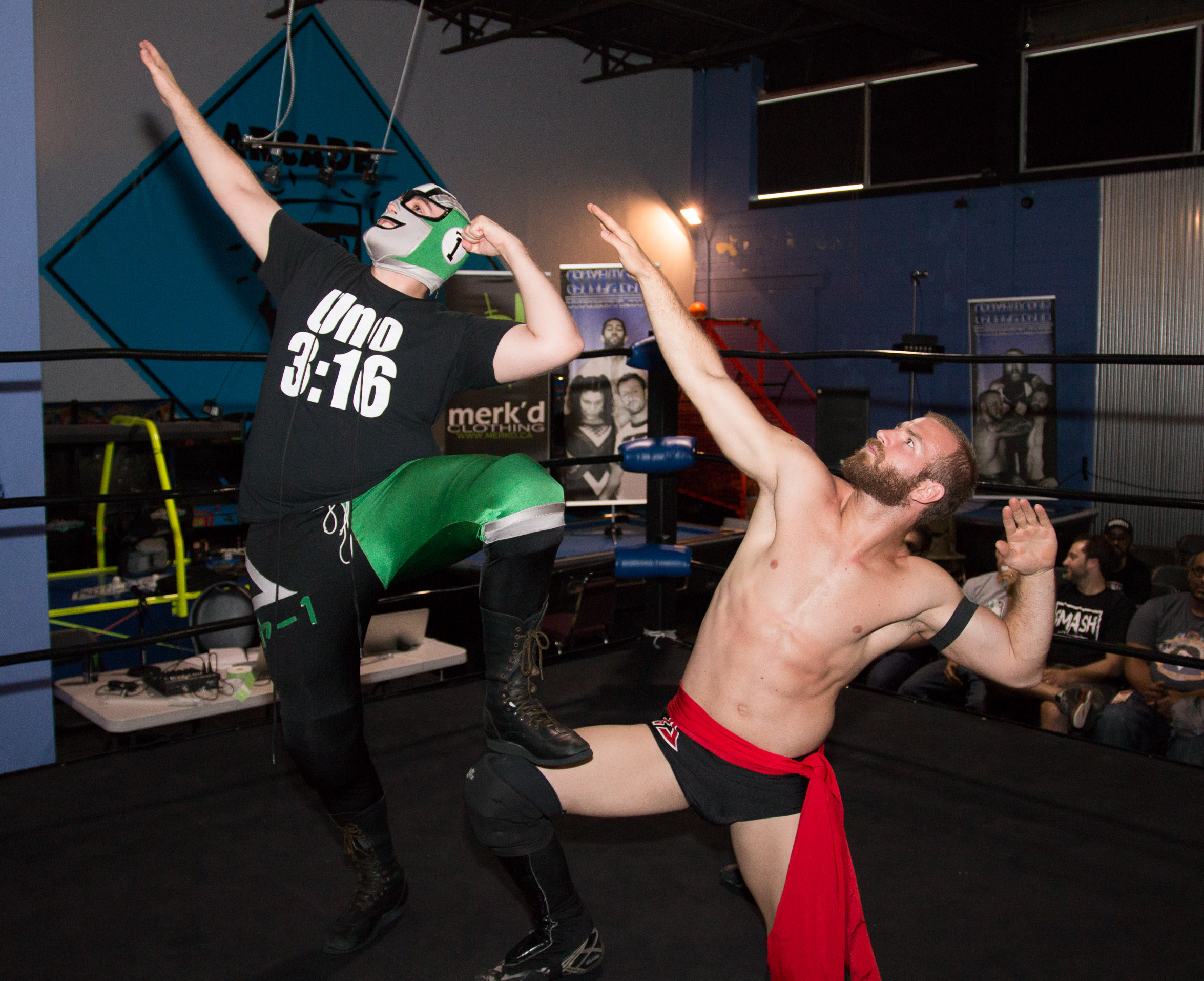
The Super Smash Bros. - Player Uno (left in the mask) and Stu Dos performing their signature in-ring pose

On January 28, 2012, the Super Smash Bros. made their debut for Dragon Gate USA, defeating The Scene (Caleb Konley and Scott Reed) in a tag team match. The following day, they picked up another win over the D.U.F. (Arik Cannon and Pinkie Sanchez), after which Uno asked for a shot at the Open the United Gate Championship. The Super Smash Bros.' win streak ended on November 2, when they were defeated by Genki Horiguchi and Ryo Saito in an Open the United Gate Championship number one contenders' match.

=== Pro Wrestling Guerrilla (2011–2013) ===
On September 10, 2011, Uno debuted in Pro Wrestling Guerrilla (PWG) as a member of the Super Smash Bros. with Stupefied. In their debut match, they faced the RockNES Monsters (Johnny Goodtime and Johnny Yuma), a tag team with a similar video game-themed gimmick, in a losing effort. The Super Smash Bros. returned on December 10, 2011, this time losing a match against the American Wolves (Davey Richards and Eddie Edwards). The Super Smash Bros. picked up their first win in PWG on March 17, 2012, by defeating former two-time PWG World Tag Team Champions, The Young Bucks (Matt and Nick Jackson), and the RockNES Monsters in a three-way match. On April 21, the Super Smash Bros. defeated The Young Bucks in the opening round, Future Shock (Adam Cole and Kyle O'Reilly) in the semifinal, and 2 Husky Black Guys (El Generico and Willie Mack) in the final round to win the 2012 Dynamite Duumvirate Tag Team Title Tournament and become number one contenders to the PWG World Tag Team Championship.

On May 25, the Super Smash Bros. defeated The Young Bucks in a No Disqualification match to win the vacant PWG World Tag Team Championship. The Super Smash Bros. made their first successful title defense on July 21 at Threemendous III, PWG's nine-year anniversary event, where they defeated Future Shock and The Young Bucks in a three-way ladder match. On December 1 at Mystery Vortex, the Super Smash Bros. made their second successful World Tag Team Championship defense against the RockNES Monsters. Later that same event, they were defeated by the Dojo Bros (Eddie Edwards and Roderick Strong) in a non-title match. On January 12, 2013, the Super Smash Bros. lost the World Tag Team Championship to the Unbreakable F'n Machines (Brian Cage and Michael Elgin) in the opening round of the 2013 Dynamite Duumvirate Tag Team Title Tournament. During the match, Uno suffered a dislocated shoulder after performing a suicide dive to the outside of the ring.

=== All Elite Wrestling (2019–present) ===
Evil Uno and Stu Grayson made their surprise debut as The Dark Order at AEW Double or Nothing on May 25, 2019, appearing at the conclusion of the match between Best Friends and Angélico and Jack Evans. After the match was over, the lights went out and when they came back on, Uno and Grayson were in the ring. The lights went out a second time and when they came back on, masked henchmen surrounded the ring. The Order then attacked all four men. After the attack, the lights went out again and they disappeared.

Appearances of The Dark Order on AEW tv continued consistently for the next few years, but eventually decreased into sporadic appearances by 2024.

=== Return to Ring of Honor (2023-present) ===
As The Dark Order's presence on AEW tv decreased, Uno and other Dark Order members returned to become regulars on Ring of Honor, which was by then functioning as a sister promotion to AEW.

== Professional wrestling style and persona ==
In Chikara, Player Uno became popular for basing his gimmick, moveset, and attire around video games, specifically games for the NES and SNES consoles. One of his former trademarks was his pants, which had an NES controller design on one side; if the "Pause" button was pressed, he would stop moving, and if his opponent hit him while he was "paused", Player Uno wouldn't react until getting "unpaused". He was also famous for wearing gear in the color schemes of characters such as Mario, Luigi, and Wario. In recent years, Player Uno has stopped using both distinctive traits. In 2015, Dansereau repackaged himself as Evil Uno.

== Other media ==
Evil Uno

Twitch information
- Channel: EvilUno
- Years active: 2020–present
- Genre: Gaming
- Followers: 37.4 thousand

YouTube information
- Channel: @mysterywrestling
- Years active: 2012–present
- Genres: Video game; Professional Wrestling; Podcast; Vlog
- Subscribers: 41.6 thousand
- Views: 1.5 million
- Last updated: August 28, 2025

On December 24, 2012, Uno appeared on a new YouTube channel called, TheNerdSlam. He, along with a group of friends, created the channel, which consists of two different web shows. One is called 4-Play where Uno plays various video games with friends. The other is a food show called Stu's Kitchen, hosted by Stupefied.

Uno is heavily involved in the charity "Fighting Back", which was set up in memory of professional wrestler Phrank Morin to raise money for the Canadian Cancer Society. Uno and his partner Player Dos have been part of multiple wrestling events for the charity since its creation in 2011. On August 14, 2015, during a 24-hour gaming stream for the charity, Uno, and Dos were given the nicknames "The Big Dog" and "The Wildcat" respectively by the video game streaming group, newLEGACYinc, who were running the Fighting Back stream that year. Uno and Dos debuted their new nicknames at 2015 Fighting Back: Wrestling with Cancer event the next day, while teaming with Último Dragón in a Trios match against Pinkie Sanchez and EYFBO.

Player Uno appears on posters in the video game Guacamelee!

As of October 6, 2021 Uno began co-hosting the online show Ranking of Evil on Giant Bomb.

== Personal life ==
Dansereau worked as a web specialist for the Canadian federal government.

== Championships and accomplishments ==
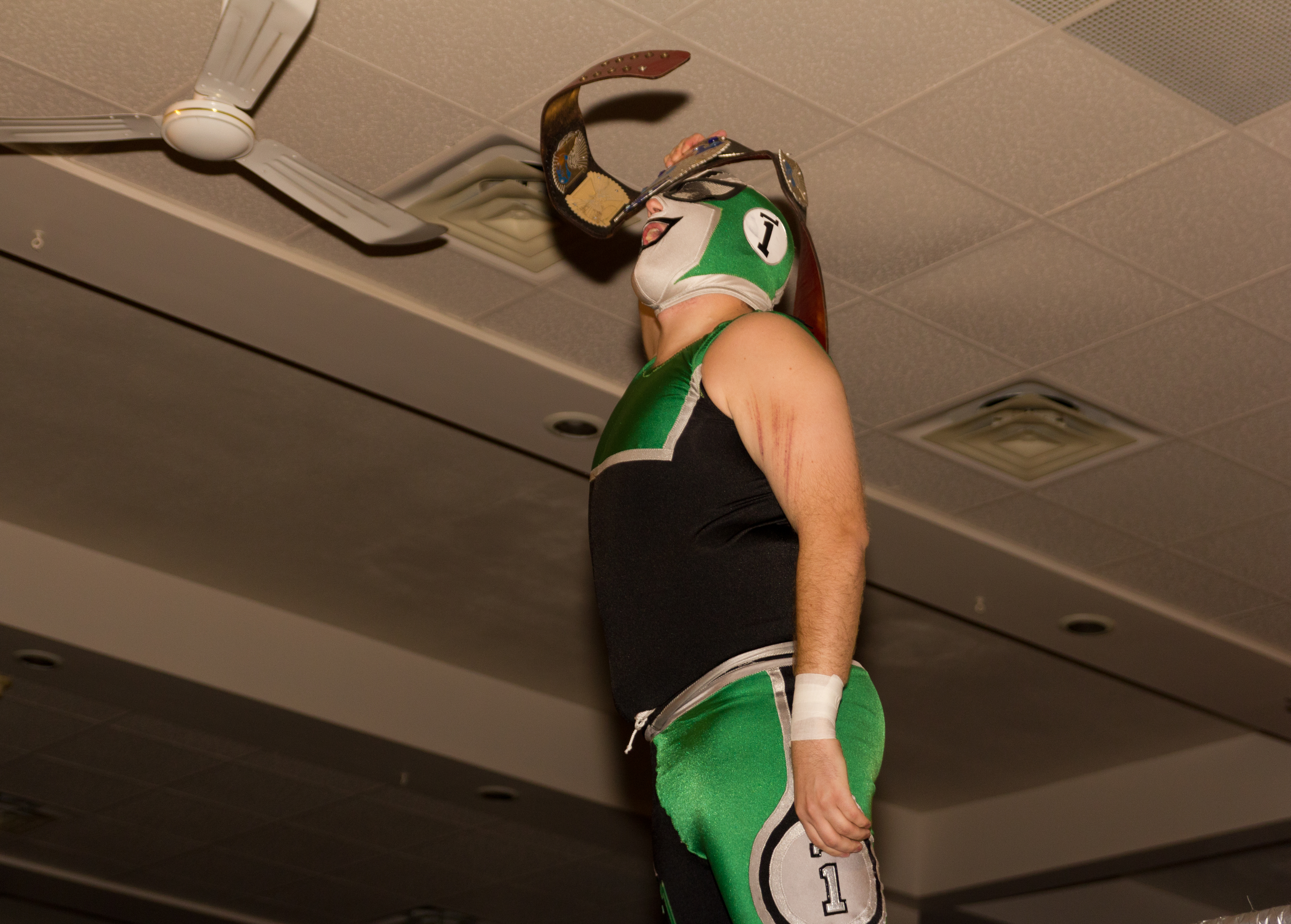
Player Uno as Alpha-1 Wrestling Tag Team Champion

- Acclaim Pro Wrestling
  - APW Heavyweight Championship (1 time)
  - APW Women’s Championship (1 time)
- Alpha-1 Wrestling
  - A1 Tag Team Championship (2 times) – with Player Dos/Stupefied
  - A1 Zero Gravity Championship (1 time)
- Capital City Championship Combat
  - C4 Championship (1 time)
  - C4 Underground Championship (1 time)
  - One Night Tournament (2008)
- Chikara
  - Campeonatos de Parejas (1 time) – with Player Dos
- Combat Revolution Wrestling
  - CRW Interim Tag Team Championship (1 time) – with Stupefied
- International Wrestling Syndicate
  - IWS Canadian Championship (1 time)
  - IWS World Tag Team Championship (1 time) – with Stupefied
- Interspecies Wrestling
  - Interspecies Championship (1 time)
  - Interspecies Other Championship (1 time)
- La Lutte C Vrai
  - LLCV Championship (1 time)
- Lucha Toronto
  - Royal Canadian Tag Team Championship (1 time) - with Stupefied
- North Shore Pro Wrestling
  - NSPW Tag Team Championship (2 times) - with Player Dos
- Pro Wrestling Guerrilla
  - PWG World Tag Team Championship (1 time) – with Stupefied
  - Dynamite Duumvirate Tag Team Title Tournament (2012) – with Stupefied
  - DDT4 (2012) - with Player Dos
- Pro Wrestling Illustrated
  - Ranked No. 188 of the top 500 singles wrestlers in the PWI 500 in 2021
- Smash Wrestling
  - Smash Wrestling Championship #1 Contender’s Tournament (2014)
  - F8tful Eight Tournament (2018) - with Stu Grayson
- SoCal Uncensored
  - Match of the Year (2012) with Stupefied vs. Future Shock (Adam Cole and Kyle O'Reilly) and The Young Bucks (Matt Jackson and Nick Jackson) on July 21
  - Tag Team of the Year (2012) – with Stupefied
- Squared Circle Wrestling
  - 2CW Tag Team Championship (1 time) – with Stupefied
