= Esports Stadium Arlington =

Esports venue in Arlington, Texas, U.S.

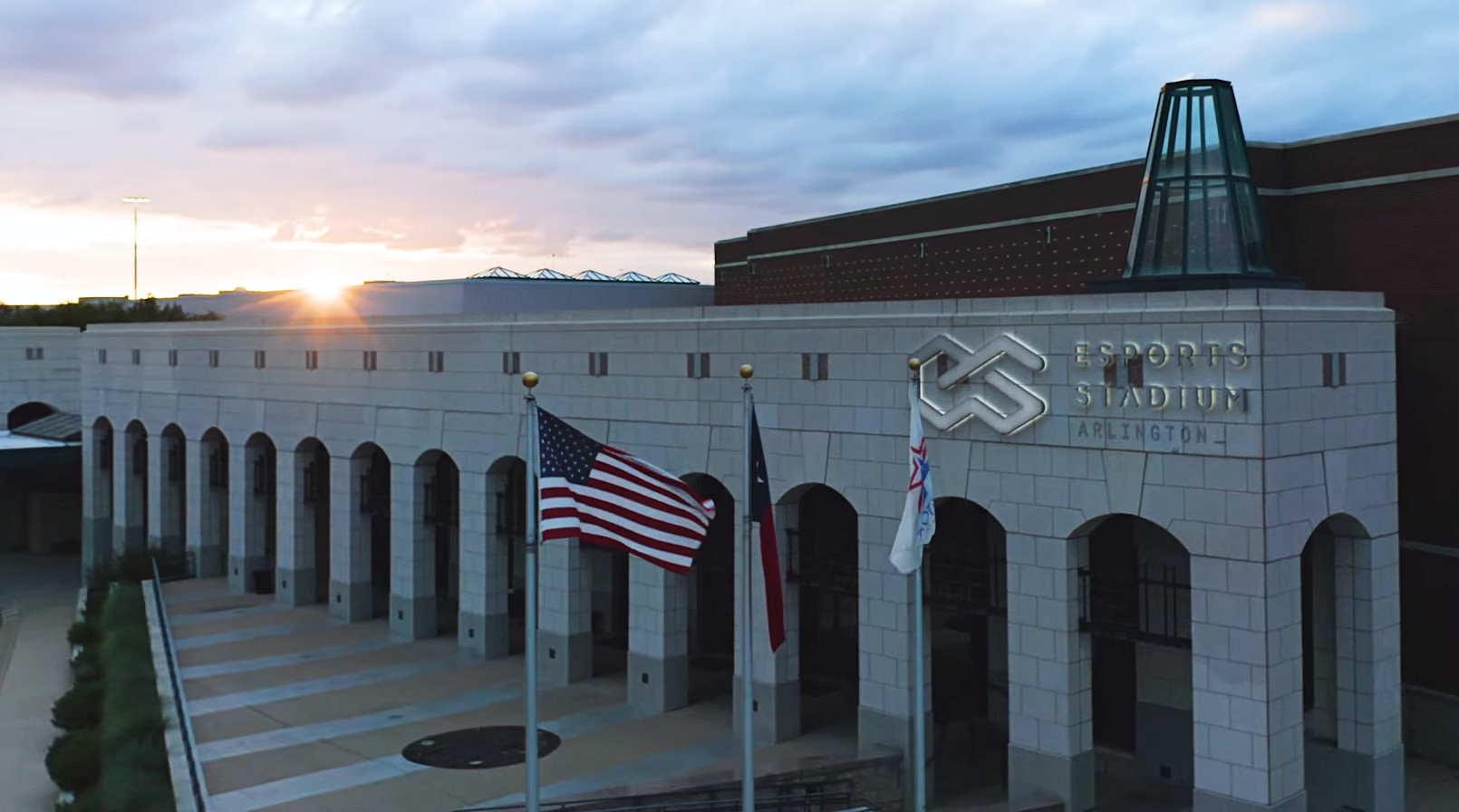
- Interactive map of Esports Stadium Arlington
- Address: 1200 Ballpark Way
- Location: Arlington, Texas, U.S.
- Coordinates: 32.7551°N 97.0820°W
- Owner: City of Arlington
- Operator: OpTic Gaming
- Capacity: 2,500 (seated)

Construction
- Opened: 1985 (as Arlington Expo Center); November 26, 2018 (as Esports Stadium Arlington
- Cost: $10 million
- Architect: Populous
- Builder: Henderson Engineers
- Project manager: Gary Berlin
- General contractor: Tom Hoffman

Tenants
- Dallas Fuel (2017–2023); OpTic Texas (2019–present)

Website
- esportsstadium.gg

Esports Stadium Arlington (ESA), formerly known as the Arlington Expo Center, is a North American esports facility, convention center, and theater located in Arlington, Texas. The 100,000 sqft venue originally was the largest dedicated esports facility in North America and holds 2,500 spectators.

== Description ==
Esports Stadium Arlington measures 100,000 square feet (9,300 m^{2}) of total space and has the capacity to hold 2,500 seated spectators.

== History ==
In March 2018, the city of Arlington announced plans to develop the largest esports stadium in the United States that was scheduled to open later that year. The project was a collaboration between the city, Esports Venues LLC, which is owned by Texas Rangers co-owner Neil Leibman, Populous, who designed the stadium, and NGAGE Esports.

The venue officially opened on November 26, 2018.

In December 2020, all but two of Esports Stadium Arlington employees were laid off. President Jonathon Oudthone left the company for undisclosed reasons, with Luke Bauer, chairman of the Texas Rangers ownership committee, becoming the new president of the venue.

In January 2022, esports and gaming company Envy Gaming, now OpTic Gaming, acquired the operating contract for Esports Stadium Arlington from Esports Venues LLC.

== Events ==
The venue's first hosted event was FACEIT's Esports Championship Series Season Six Finals, a global competition for Counter-Strike: Global Offensive in November 2018. After shutting down operations due in February 2020 due to the COVID-19 pandemic, ESA hosted its first live event since the pandemic began — a match between the Dallas Fuel and Houston Outlaws of the Overwatch League in July 2021.

Since the OpTic Gaming merger, the stadium has hosted many OpTic events such as Call of Duty League majors, Halo Championship Series majors, and Off-Season events. Other notable events include: the Esports Awards in 2019 and 2021, PGL Dota 2 Major in 2022, the first in North America since 2016, and Smite World Championships in 2023 and 2024.

On May 16, 2024, the venue became a theater, as its first non-video gaming events were announced, as All Elite Wrestling held a residency at the venue, billed as the Path to All In summer series. The summer series consisted of five consecutive weeks of its Saturday night television show Collision, a live Battle of the Belts special, a Rampage taping, as well as Ring of Honor's Death Before Dishonor pay-per-view and tapings for its weekly TV show.

The venue was initially scheduled to be the host of the Sonic the Hedgehog fan convention, Sonic Expo 2024, which would've featured Johnny Gioeli of Crush 40. However, the convention was moved to the Mesquite Convention Center and Arena.
