= Gotham Wrestling =

American professional wrestling promotion

- Logo for Gotham Wrestling used since 2025
- Founded: 2025
- Style: Rasslin'
- Headquarters: West Nyack, New York, United States
- Founder: David Marquez
- Owner: David Marquez
- Parent: Championship Television
- Website: https://www.gothamwrestling.com

Gotham Wrestling
- Also known as: Gotham Wrestling
- Genre: Professional wrestling
- Created by: David Marquez
- Starring: Gotham Wrestling roster
- Country of origin: United States
- Original language: English

Production
- Executive producer: David Marquez
- Production locations: West Nyack Levity Live at Palisades Center, West Nyack, New York
- Camera setup: Multicamera setup
- Running time: 60 minutes
- Production companies: David Marquez Productions; Championship Television

Original release
- Network: First-run syndication YouTube
- Release: January 11, 2026

Gotham Wrestling is an American professional wrestling television program and United Wrestling Network (UWN) territory created by David Marquez. The series first premiered on January 11, 2026 and airs on first-run syndication in the United States and YouTube worldwide.

== History ==
In August 2025, the United Wrestling Network announced their first regional branch in the Northeast called "Gotham Wrestling". The first event would also be announced to take place at the West Nyack Levity Live at the Palisades Center in West Nyack, New York on October 16, 2025.

On September 8, 2025, UWN announced that AEW wrestler Jay Lethal, Karl Fredericks, UWN Women’s Champion Big Mama, VSK, at-the-time UWN Tag Team Champions the Wolf Zaddies, and Brett Ryan Gosselin would be featured during the first set of tapings. PW Insider had also reported that the UWN was also in negotiations with television stations to air the Gotham Wrestling program on syndication.

On October 16, 2025, PW Insider had reported that former WWE NXT producer Nick Bonnano was producing the show along with partnering up with local promotion Xcite Wrestling to provide the ring and production equipment. Jay Lethal however was also reported to have dropped out from the event due to a family emergency that occurred overnight prior to the taping. On December 2, 2025, PW Insider had reported that the UWN had secured syndication deals with the New England Sports Network, Mid-Atlantic Sports Network, Sportsnet Pennsylvania, and Gray Media to air Gotham Wrestling.

On January 8, 2026, UWN announced that they would be preempting its flagship show Championship Wrestling with the timeslot being replaced in syndication and on YouTube with Gotham Wrestling.

Beginning on March 8, 2026, select matches from UWN's Sunday Night Slam livestreaming supercards in Long Beach, California were taped to be aired on Gotham Wrestling and Championship Wrestling.

On June 2, 2026, the UWN held their first supercard under the Gotham Wrestling brand when they teamed up with Xcite Wrestling to present the Battle of Gotham which aired on tape delay as episodes of Gotham Wrestling.
