= 1FW TV =

American professional wrestling television program

- Genre: Professional wrestling
- Created by: Michael Cuellari
- Presented by: Brandon Benefield and Conrad Thompson
- Starring: 1FW roster
- Country of origin: United States
- Original language: English

Production
- Producers: Michael Cuellari; Scott D'Amore
- Camera setup: Multicamera setup
- Production company: 1 Fall Wrestling

Original release
- Network: Syndication
- Release: October 1, 2025 – present
- Network: Triller TV
- Release: October 1, 2025 – present
- Network: MyAEW
- Release: May 22, 2026 – present

1FW TV is an American professional wrestling television program produced by 1 Fall Wrestling (1FW). The show first premiered on October 1, 2025 in syndication, with the flagship station being the Peachtree Sports Network owned by Gray Media headquartered in Atlanta, Georgia.

== History ==
On March 15, 2025, QT Marshall announced that he would be relaunching 1FW with the first show taking place on April 25, 2025 at Freedom Brew & Shine in Cumming, Georgia. On July 25, 2025, 1FW held the inaugural SummerStage event at the Center Stage Theater in Atlanta, Georgia. On September 29, 2025, Triller TV announced that 1FW's weekly show would be premiering on October 1, 2025 on the streaming service in addition to the Peachtree Sports Network and syndication on various Gray Media affiliates with the first four episodes consisting of footage from the SummerStage event. The first episode premiered on October 1, 2025 with the main event being an eight-man tag team match between the team of QT Marshall, Brody King, Austin Gunn, and Billy Gunn and the team of Preston Vance, Griff Garrison, Jacked Jameson, and Cole Karter. On January 16, 2026, Maple Leaf Pro Wrestling and Border City Wrestling owner Scott D'Amore joined the 1FW as a co-executive producer of 1FW TV a and creative consultant for the promotion. On May 22, 2026, 1FW announced that they would be the first independent promotion to feature its content on All Elite Wrestling (AEW)'s recently launched MyAEW streaming service including 1FW TV with new episodes being added to the platform beginning with the June 8, 2026 episode.
