= 1 Fall Wrestling =

American professional wrestling promotion

- Founded: 2017; 2025 (relaunch)
- Style: Professional wrestling
- Headquarters: 1380 S Zack Hinton Pkwy; McDonough, Georgia, United States
- Founder: QT Marshall
- Owner: QT Marshall
- Website: https://1fwlive.com/

1 Fall Wrestling (1FW) is an American independent professional wrestling promotion based in McDonough, Georgia owned by professional wrestler QT Marshall. The promotion has also been a member of the United Wrestling Network (UWN) since 2025 and has aired their programming as part of a joint syndicated block with the UWN on various television stations in addition to their programming airing on Triller TV and MyAEW worldwide.

== History ==
The promotion was first launched in 2017 with the first show taking place on December 12, 2017 at the Landmark Arena in Cornelia, Georgia. On February 22, 2019, 1FW crowned the inaugural 1FW Heavyweight Champion when Elijah Evans IV defeated Cody Vance during the Fallout show at the One Fall Power Factory in Norcross, Georgia. After Vindication on September 27, 2019, 1FW would go on hiatus.

On March 15, 2025, QT Marshall announced that he would be relaunching 1FW with the first show taking place on April 25, 2025 at Freedom Brew & Shine in Cumming, Georgia. On July 25, 2025, 1FW held the inaugural SummerStage event at the Center Stage Theater in Atlanta, Georgia.

On January 16, 2026, Maple Leaf Pro Wrestling and Border City Wrestling owner Scott D'Amore joined the 1FW as a co-producer and creative consultant. On May 22, 2026, 1FW announced that they would be the first independent promotion to feature its content on All Elite Wrestling (AEW)'s recently launched MyAEW streaming service.

On August 11, 2026, 1FW announced that they would be holding TV tapings in conjunction with All Elite Wrestling's Rebel Heart television special.

== Championships ==
Championship	Current champion(s)	Date won	Days held	Location
1FW Breakout Championship	Tyler Shoop	July 17, 2026	69+	Atlanta, Georgia
1FW Heavyweight Championship	Carlie Bravo	July 17, 2026	69+	Atlanta, Georgia
1FW Women's Championship	Angelica Risk	March 23, 2026	185+	Rome, Georgia
1FW Tag Team Championship	Brady Booker and Elijah Drago	July 17,2026	69+	Atlanta, Georgia

== See also ==
- List of independent wrestling promotions in the United States
