= Preston Vance =

American professional wrestler (born 1992)

Personal information
- Born: Cody Vance; January 15, 1992 (age 34) Clare, Michigan, U.S.

Professional wrestling career
- Ring name(s): 10; Cody Vance; Cody Vincent; Preston Vance
- Billed height: 6 ft 2 in (188 cm)
- Billed weight: 240 lb (109 kg)
- Trained by: Monster Factory
- Debut: September 26, 2015

Cody Vance (born January 15, 1992), better known by his ring name Preston Vance, is an American professional wrestler. He is signed to All Elite Wrestling (AEW), where he is a member of The Dark Order. He also performs in AEW's sister promotion Ring of Honor (ROH).

== Professional wrestling career ==
=== Early career (2015–2020) ===
Vance debuted in professional wrestling in September 2015. He initially primarily wrestled for Monster Factory Pro Wrestling in Paulsboro, New Jersey. Beginning in 2016, he wrestled for various promotions on the independent circuit including Anarchy Wrestling, Georgia Premier Wrestling, New South Pro Wrestling, and Pro Wrestling Bushido.

=== All Elite Wrestling / Ring of Honor (2020–present) ===
On the January 1, 2020 episode of AEW Dark, Vance made his debut for All Elite Wrestling (AEW), teaming with Shawn Spears in a loss to Austin and Billy Gunn. Later in the year he aligned himself with The Dark Order, under the direction of Brodie Lee.

In late 2022, Vance turned heel and aligned himself with Rush and La Faccion Ingobernable. On January 14, 2024, at Battle of the Belts IX, he unsuccessfully challenged Orange Cassidy for the AEW International Championship. In September 2024, Vance quietly left La Faccion Igobernable and began wrestling on AEW's sister promotion Ring of Honor (ROH) as a face. On the September 26, 2024 episode of Ring of Honor Wrestling, Vance unsuccessfully challenged Lee Moriarty for the ROH Pure Championship.

In February 2025, Vance, Griff Garrison, Cole Karter, and Jacked Jameson formed a stable, the "Frat House", turning heel once again. On the August 6, 2026 episode of ROH Wrestling, Vance was kicked out of the Frat House and was saved by The Dark Order, rejoining the group and turning face.

== Personal life ==
Vance has Crohn's disease.

== Championships and accomplishments ==
- Monster Factory Pro Wrestling
  - MFPW Heavyweight Championship (1 time)
  - MFPW Network Championship (1 time)
