= A Tribute to "The Butcher" Andy Williams =

2026 All Elite Wrestling television special and memorial event

- Promotional poster featuring Andy Williams
- Promotion: All Elite Wrestling
- Date: September 12, 2026
- City: Springfield, Massachusetts
- Venue: MassMutual Center
- Attendance: 2,821

Collision special episodes chronology
← Previous; Summer Blockbuster	Next → Grand Slam France

A Tribute to "The Butcher" Andy Williams was a professional wrestling memorial event and television special produced by All Elite Wrestling (AEW). The event took place on September 12, 2026 at the MassMutual Center in Springfield, Massachusetts. It aired live on TNT and simulcasted on HBO Max as a special episode of AEW's weekly television program Saturday Night Collision. It paid tribute to "The Butcher" Andy Williams following his death a week prior.

== Production ==
=== Background ===
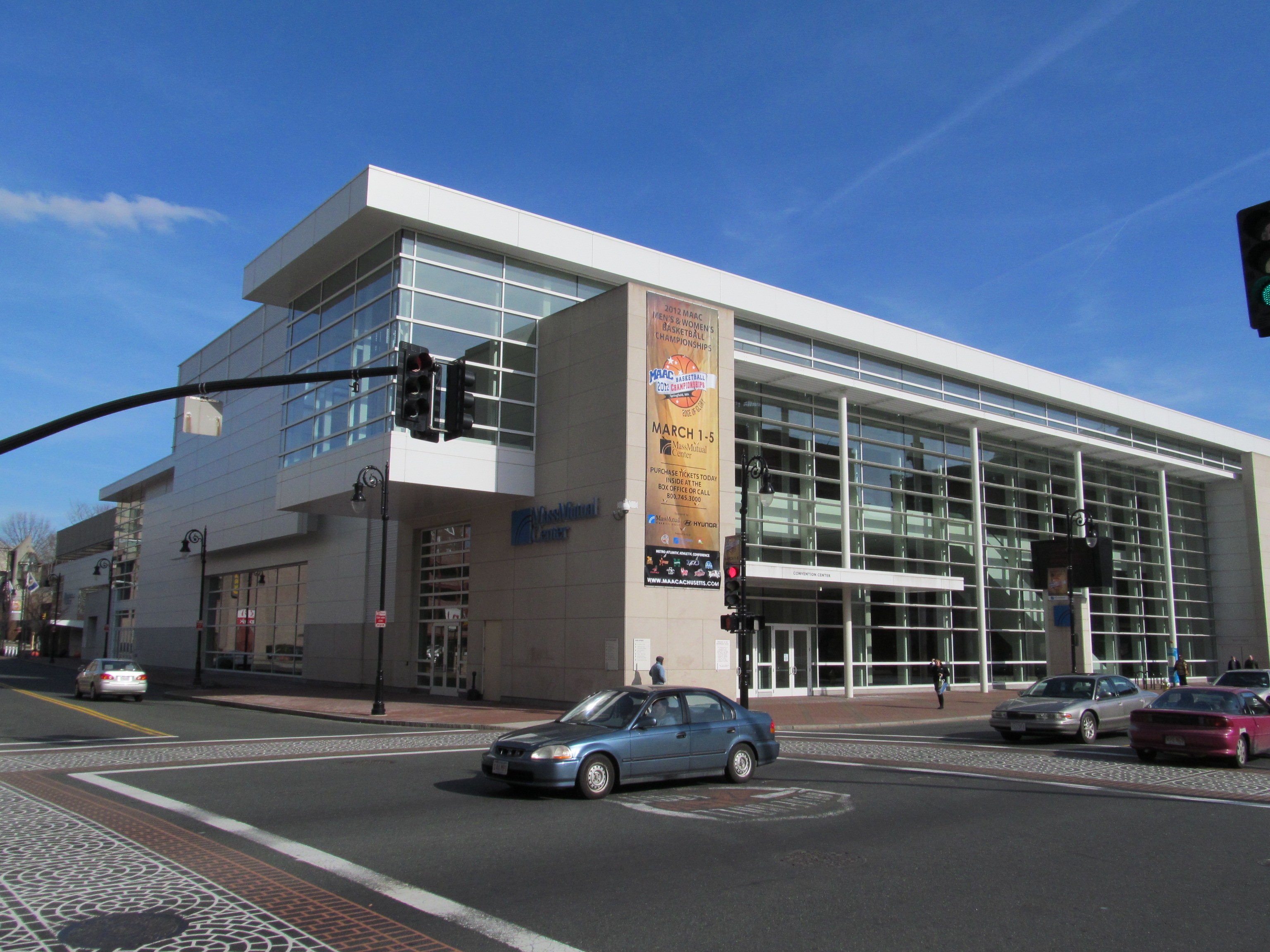
The event took place at the MassMutual Center in Springfield, Massachusetts.

Professional wrestler Andy Williams, also known as "The Butcher".

On September 5, 2026, during an independent wrestling event held by Enjoy Wrestling in Millvale, Pennsylvania, "The Butcher" Andy Williams legitimately collapsed ringside after he allegedly struck his head on a ringpost and hit the floor in a tag team match, which led to the remainder of the show being canceled. In a statement, Enjoy Wrestling's co-founder, Kurt Hackimer, stated Williams' symptoms "were consistent with a cardiac event". After his condition "worsened", two on-site doctors began to administer CPR and applied an automated external defibrillator (AED) until ambulance crews arrived, with the defibrillator being provided by police. Williams stopped breathing before the arrival of the emergency medical services, though they continued to attempt life-saving measures, and he was transported to Allegheny General Hospital where he was pronounced deceased. The day after, Allegheny County Medical Examiner's Office confirmed to TMZ that Williams had died aged 48 years old, with an official cause and manner of death pending, though the Millvale Police Department stated that "no visible signs of trauma and no indications of foul play [were] observed" by their investigating officers.

On September 8, the president of All Elite Wrestling (AEW) Tony Khan opened the Ring of Honor tapings in Jacksonville, Florida with a 10-bell salute, tribute graphic on-screen, and said some "kind words" to honor Williams, who was an early signee of the promotion and only departed once his contract expired in the summer. When Wednesday Night Dynamite's television special, Rebel Heart, was broadcast live the following day, the show opened with a graphic honoring Williams, and saw all three commentators — play-by-play commentator Excalibur, color commentator Taz, and fellow commentator Tony Schiavone — each pay tribute respectively as they gave their own speeches. While Excalibur was delivering his speech, another graphic was shown confirming the next episode of Collision would be a tribute to Williams.

On September 12, hours before the special, Khan went live on social media and revealed three of the matches that would be contested. In the live stream, he noted that "The Butcher" Battle Royale would serve as the main event, with the winner able to donate $100,000 to a charity of their choice, in Williams' name.

=== Storylines ===
The event included professional wrestling matches that resulted from scripted storylines. Results were predetermined by AEW's writers, and the storylines were produced on AEW's weekly television programs Dynamite and Collision.

== Results ==
No.	Results	Stipulations	Times
1	Jon Moxley (c) defeated "Speedball" Mike Bailey by pinfall	AEW Continental Championship eliminator match	18:09
2	The Rascalz (Zachary Wentz, Myron Reed, and Dezmond Xavier) defeated Aaron Solo, Griff Garrison, and Nick Comoroto by pinfall	Trios match	2:00
3	Queen Aminata defeated Mina Shirakawa by pinfall	Singles match	10:18
4	Jay White (with Juice Robinson, Austin Gunn, Colten Gunn, and Ace Austin) defeated Adam Priest	Singles match	5:11
5	Pac and The Dogs (David Finlay, Clark Connors, and Gabe Kidd) defeated Bang Bang Gang (Juice Robinson, Austin Gunn, Colten Gunn, and Ace Austin) by pinfall	Eight-man tag team match	10:51
6	The Conglomeration (Orange Cassidy, Roderick Strong, and Kyle O'Reilly) defeated The Lethal Twist (Jay Lethal, Blake Christian, and Lee Johnson) by pinfall	Trios match	9:54
7	Daniel Garcia won by last eliminating Josh Alexander (Note: Other wrestlers in order of elimination: AR Fox, Ortiz, Wheeler Yuta, The Beast Mortos, Jake Doyle, Dante Martin, Darius Martin, Lance Archer, Claudio Castagnoli, and Eddie Kingston.)	12-man "The Butcher" Battle Royale; The winner, Daniel Garcia, got to donate $100,000 in Williams' name to his own chosen charity, titled MusiCares.	16:22
(c) / – the champion(s) heading into the match

== See also ==
- Brodie Lee Celebration of Life
- Jay Briscoe Celebration of Life
- Rebel Heart
- A Tribute to Pac
