= A Tribute to Pac =

2026 All Elite Wrestling television special and memorial event

- Promotional poster featuring Pac
- Promotion: All Elite Wrestling
- Date: September 30, 2026
- City: Pittsburgh, Pennsylvania
- Venue: Petersen Events Center
- Attendance: 3,386

Dynamite special episodes chronology
← Previous; Rebel Heart	Next → Grand Slam France

A Tribute to Pac was a professional wrestling memorial event and television special produced by All Elite Wrestling (AEW). The event took place on September 30, 2026, at the Petersen Events Center in Pittsburgh, Pennsylvania. It was broadcast live on TBS and HBO Max in the United States and syndicated internationally on MyAEW as a special episode of AEW's weekly television program, Wednesday Night Dynamite. It paid tribute to AEW wrestler Benjamin "Pac" Satterley following his death three days prior.

== Production ==
=== Background ===
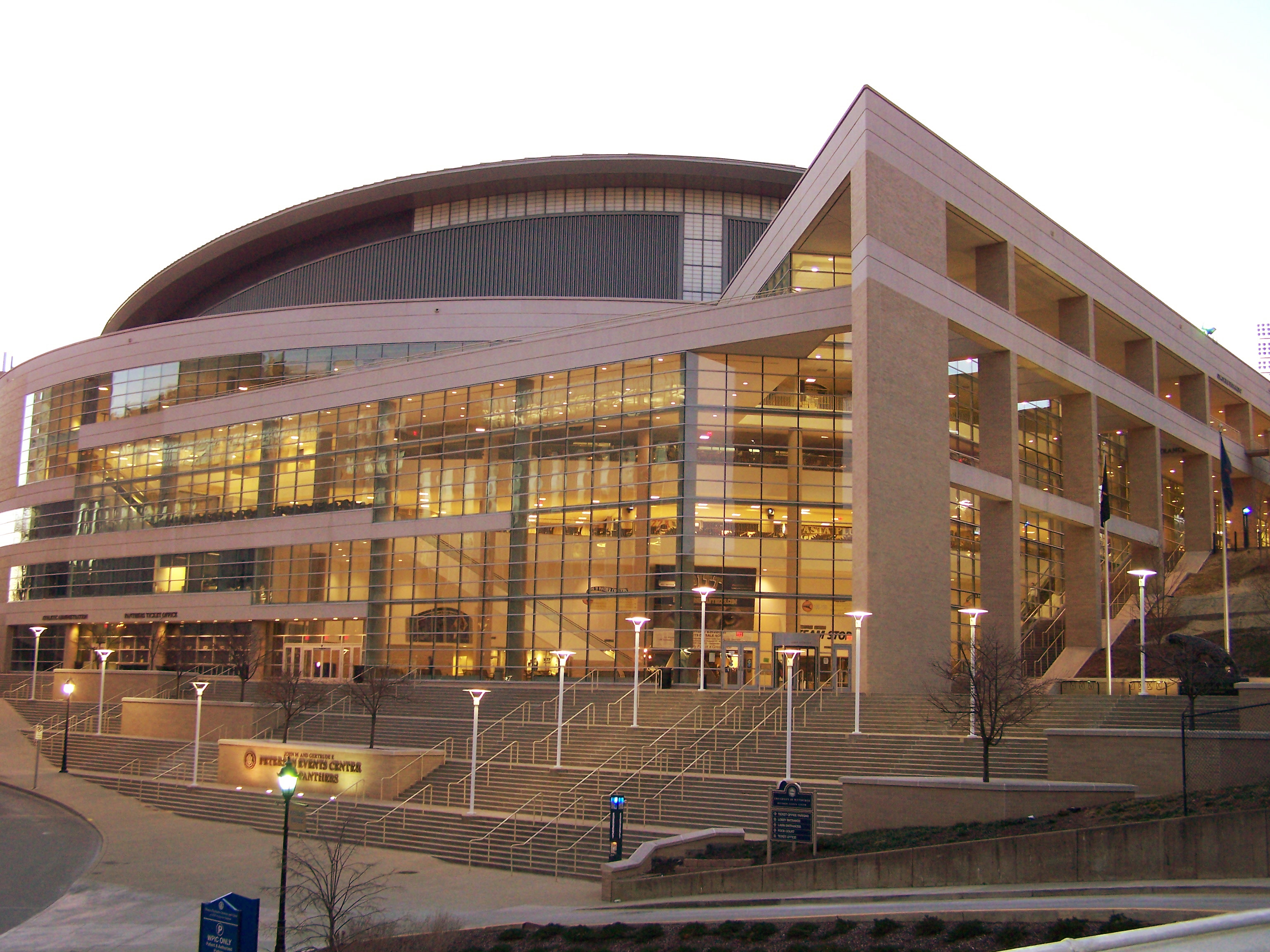
The event took place at Pittsburgh's Petersen Events Center.

Professional wrestler Pac at a AEW Collision taping in 2025 (left), and holding two of AEW's signature championships: the AEW All-Atlantic Championship and AEW World Trios Championship in 2022 (right).

On September 27, 2026, All Elite Wrestling (AEW) issued a statement on their website and social media channels announcing the death of Benjamin Satterley, best known by his ring name Pac (often stylised in all caps) after being found unresponsive in a rental car in the parking lot of a Cava restaurant in Des Plaines, Illinois, with condolences issued to his family, friends, and fans. The official cause of death was later determined to be bronchial asthma.

The following day, at the tapings for AEW's sister promotion Ring of Honor in Jacksonville, Florida, AEW president Tony Khan paid his respects to Pac, before leading a ten-bell salute and moment of silence. Afterwards, Khan formally announced that the September 30 edition of Dynamite would be a tribute episode to Pac, and noted that all talent appearing on the show would be performing voluntarily. In a Tweet shared on X, a spokesperson for AEW said the episode would "honor the life, career, and legacy" of Pac.

The event aired head-to-head against WWE's Worlds Collide, which took place on September 26 (opposite AEW's All Out) but aired on YouTube via tape delay.

=== Storylines ===
As a memorial event, AEW intended for this event to be non-canonical, ignoring some ongoing feuds and storylines of the promotion in favor of matches and segments that paid tribute to Pac. Storylines were produced on AEW's weekly television programs, AEW Dynamite and AEW Collision.

== Event ==
The commentators were Excalibur and Tony Schiavone. The ring announcer was Justin Roberts, and the interviewer was Renee Paquette.

Other on-screen personnel
Role:	Name:
English commentators	Excalibur
English commentators	Tony Schiavone
English commentators	Jon Moxley (Death Riders vs. Don Callis Family)
Ring announcer	Justin Roberts
Referees	Bryce Remsburg
Referees	Aubrey Edwards
Referees	Paul Turner
Interviewer	Renee Paquette

== Reception ==
Jason Powell of Pro Wrestling Dot Net described the show as "truly beautiful". Chris Mueller of Bleacher Report wrote that all performers who showed up had put on a show that "would make Pac proud". Wrestling Observer Newsletter editor Dave Meltzer described the show as "the best wrestling [TV] show ever". The show became the highest-rated event in Cagematch history at 9.94 out of 10.

== Results ==
No.	Results	Stipulations	Times
1	Jon Moxley (c) defeated Orange Cassidy by pinfall	Singles match for the AEW Continental Championship	17:20
2	The Elite (Kenny Omega, "Hangman" Adam Page, Matt Jackson, and Nick Jackson) defeated Don Callis Family (Kevin Knight, Kyle Fletcher, Rocky Romero, and Trent Beretta) (with Don Callis) by pinfall	Eight-man tag team match	14:05
3	Will Ospreay (with Andrade El Ídolo, Francesco Akira, and Mike Bailey) defeated Ricochet (with Bishop Kaun and Toa Liona) by pinfall	Singles match	17:00
4	Hyan, Marina Shafir, and Thunder Rosa (with Jon Moxley) defeated Dr. Britt Baker, D.M.D., Mercedes Moné, and Persephone by submission	Trios match	11:00
5	Death Riders (Bryan Danielson, Claudio Castagnoli, Daniel Garcia, Gabe Kidd, and Wheeler Yuta) (with Jon Moxley and Marina Shafir) defeated Don Callis Family (Jake Doyle, Josh Alexander, Lance Archer, Mark Davis, and Wardlow) (with Don Callis) by pinfall	10-man tag team match	16:00
(c) / – the champion(s) heading into the match

== See also ==
- Brodie Lee Celebration of Life
- The Jay Briscoe Celebration of Life
- Rebel Heart
- A Tribute to "The Butcher" Andy Williams
