= List of professional wrestling memorial shows =

This is a list of professional wrestling memorial shows from the 1980s until the present day. Memorial shows have been historically important in the history of professional wrestling, usually held in memory of a recently deceased wrestler, promoter or other well-known personality, and used to pay tribute to a particular individual's accomplishments and contributions to the industry. The proceeds are generally donated to family members or charitable organizations.

These shows were often held as a form of supercard, a major wrestling event not aired on pay-per-view, and sometimes resulted interpromotional shows. These types of shows were rarely seen in the United States, the earliest being the Von Erich Memorial Parade of Champions held in memory of David Von Erich from 1984–1988, but have been common in Japan since the late 1980s. In North America, memorial shows are most often held by independent wrestling promotions although mainstream organizations like WWE have occasionally dedicated specific episodes of WWE Raw or WWE SmackDown to then current WWE wrestlers such as Owen Hart (1999), Eddie Guerrero (2005), Chris Benoit (2007), and Bray Wyatt (2023), and All Elite Wrestling on AEW Dynamite to then current AEW wrestlers Brodie Lee (2020) and Pac (2026).

== List ==
=== 1980s ===
Name	Promotion	Organizer(s)	Years active	Notes
Mike Marino Memorial Shield	Dale Martin Promotions	Dale Martin	1981	
Von Erich Memorial Parade of Champions	World Class Championship Wrestling	Fritz Von Erich	1984–1988	
Johnny Rougeau Memorial Show			1984	
Jim Crockett, Sr. Memorial Cup	Jim Crockett Promotions	Jim Crockett, Jr.	1986–1988	
Eddie Graham Memorial Show	Championship Wrestling from Florida	Hiro Matsuda; Duke Keomuka	1987–1988	Each show was held under different banners, the second being promoted by Mike Graham and Florida Championship Wrestling.
Frank Tunney, Sr. Memorial Tag Team Tournament	World Wrestling Federation	Vince McMahon	1987	
Ikki Kajiwara Memorial Show	Multiple promotions	Giant Baba; Antonio Inoki	1988	Interpromotional event including All Japan Pro Wrestling, Japan Women's Pro Wrestling and New Japan Pro-Wrestling.
Bruiser Brody Memorial Show	All Japan Pro Wrestling	Giant Baba	1988	

=== 1990s ===
Name	Promotion	Organizer(s)	Years active	Notes
Pat O'Connor Memorial International Cup Tag Team Tournament	World Championship Wrestling	Ole Anderson	1990	Hosted at Starrcade '90.
Kerry Von Erich Memorial Show	Global Wrestling Federation	Grey Pierson	1993	Headlined by Kevin Von Erich (with Fritz Von Erich) and a mystery wrestler managed by Skandor Akbar.
Rikidozan Memorial Show	Multiple promotions		1996	Interpromotional event including All Japan Pro Wrestling, Big Japan Pro Wrestling, Frontier Martial-Arts Wrestling, Gaea Japan, IWA Japan, Michinoku Pro Wrestling, New Japan Pro-Wrestling, UWFi and others.
Ilio DiPaolo Memorial Show	World Championship Wrestling	Dennis DiPaolo; Eric Bischoff	1996-1999	
Eddie Gilbert Memorial Brawl	National Wrestling Alliance	Dennis Coraluzzo	1996-1999	
Eddie Gilbert Memorial Show	IWA Mid-South	Ian Rotten	1997-1998	
Ikki Kajiwara Memorial Show	Multiple promotions	Giant Baba; Antonio Inoki	1997	Interpromotional event including All Japan Pro Wrestling, Michinoku Pro Wrestling, New Japan Pro-Wrestling and others.
Plum Mariko Memorial Show	JWP Joshi Puroresu		1997-1998	
Brian Pillman Memorial Show	Heartland Wrestling Association	Harley Race	1998-2001	
Tojo Yamamoto Memorial Show	Music City Wrestling	Bert Prentice	1998	
Junkyard Dog Memorial Show	Long Island Wrestling Federation	Bobby Lombardi	1998	
Shane Shamrock Memorial Cup	Maryland Championship Wrestling	Dan McDevitt; Mark Shrader	1999-	
Curtis Comes Home	Multiple promotions	Cody Michaels	1999	Interpromotional event including Extreme Championship Wrestling, World Championship Wrestling, and the World Wrestling Federation.
Giant Baba Memorial Show	All Japan Pro Wrestling	Mitsuharu Misawa	1999	
Raw Is Owen	World Wrestling Federation	Vince McMahon	1999	Hosted on the May 24 edition of WWF Monday Night Raw.

=== 2000s ===
Name	Promotion	Organizer(s)	Years active	Notes
Rikidozan Memorial Show	Multiple promotions		2000	Interpromotional event including All Japan Pro Wrestling, Big Japan Pro Wrestling, New Japan Pro-Wrestling, Michinoku Pro Wrestling, Frontier Martial-Arts Wrestling, Gaea Japan, UWFi and others.
Gary Albright Memorial Show	World Xtreme Wrestling	Afa Anoaʻi	2000	
Mark Curtis Memorial Weekend of Champions	Southern States Wrestling	Beau James	2000-2003	
Todd The Bod Memorial Tournament	Canadian Wrestling Federation	Ernie Todd	2000	
Tony Rumble Memorial Show	Century Wrestling Alliance	Knuckles Nelson; Jeff Katz	2000-2007	
Robert "Diceman" Hornack Memorial Show	Allied Powers Wrestling Federation	Chris Lash	2000	
Bruiser Brody Memorial	IWA Puerto Rico	Víctor Quiñones	2000	First Bruiser Brody memorial show held in Puerto Rico.
Giant Baba Memorial Spectacular	All Japan Pro Wrestling		2001	Also served as retirement show for Stan Hansen.
Lee Sanders Memorial Tournament	Windy City Pro Wrestling	Sam DeCero	2001-2010	
Terry Gordy Memorial Show	Legends of Pro Wrestling	Linda Marx Keebles	2001	
Manfred Koch Memorial Cup	European Wrestling Promotion	Christian Eckstein; Jörg Vespermann	2001	
Yokozuna Memorial Show	World Xtreme Wrestling	Afa Anoaʻi	2001	
Giant Baba Memorial Cup	All Japan Pro Wrestling	Keiji Mutoh	2002	
Russ Haas Memorial Show	Jersey All Pro Wrestling	Frank Iadeavia	2002	
Giant Baba Memorial Six Man Tag Team Tournament	All-Japan Pro Wrestling	Keiji Mutoh	2002	
Big Dick Dudley Memorial Show	USA Pro Wrestling	Frank Goodman	2002-2003	
Russ Haas Memorial Tag Team Tournament	Phoenix Championship Wrestling	Donnie Bucci	2002	
Ted Petty Memorial Inventational Tournament	IWA Mid-South	Ian Rotten	2002-2008	
Jeff Peterson Memorial Cup	Multiple promotions	Howard Brody	2003-	Interpromotional event including Full Impact Pro, IPW Hardcore and NWA Florida.
Mike Lockwood Memorial Show	Pro Wrestling Iron	Donovan Morgan	2003	
Johnny Weaver Memorial Tournament	CWF Mid-Atlantic	Jeff Rudd; Danny Wenkel	2004-	The tournament was attended by Johnny Weaver until his death in 2008 and subsequently held as a memorial event by the promotion.
Fred Ward Memorial Show	Great Championship Wrestling	Jerry Oates	2004-2009	
Mike Lockwood Memorial Tournament	New Breed Wrestling Association	Mike Wallace	2005	
Ray Mendez Memorial Tournament	Pro Wrestling eXpress	Jim Miller	2005-2006	
Chris Candido Memorial J-Cup	National Wrestling Superstars	Joe Panzarino; Gino Moore	2005-	Hosted at the 5th annual J-Cup tournament.
Mark Curtis Memorial Reunion		Pam Hildebrand-Clark	2005	
Chris Candido Memorial Show	USA Pro Wrestling	Frank Goodman	2005-2006	
Victor The Bodyguard Memorial Cup	IWA Puerto Rico	Víctor Quiñones	2005	
Bruiser Brody Memorial Cup	World Wrestling Council	Victor Jovica; Carlos Colón	2005-2006	
Chris Candido Memorial Tag Team Tournament	Total Nonstop Action Wrestling	Jerry Jarrett	2005	
Chri$ Ca$h Memorial Show	Combat Zone Wrestling	John Zandig; D. J. Hyde	2005-	
Raw Is Eddie	World Wrestling Entertainment	Vince McMahon	2005	Hosted on the November 14 edition of WWE Raw.
Jay Youngblood Memorial Tag Team Cup Tournament	Professional Wrestling Federation		2006-2008	
Great Goliath Memorial Battle Royal	Empire Wrestling Federation	Jesse Hernandez; Bill Anderson	2006-	
Shinya Hashimoto Memorial Six-Man Tag Team Tournament	HUSTLE	Nobuhiko Takada	2006	
Jose Miguel Perez Memorial Cup	IWA Puerto Rico	Savio Vega; Miguel Pérez, Jr.	2006-	
Pitbull/Public Enemy Tag Team Memorial Cup	Pro Wrestling Unplugged	Tod Gordon; Johnny Kashmere	2006-	
Eddie Graham Memorial Battle of the Belts	Full Impact Pro	Sal Hamaoui	2007, 2009	
Steve Ranton Memorial Tournament	Valley Championship Wrestling		2007	
Chris Candido Cup Tag Team Tournament	IWA Mid-South	Ian Rotten	2007-2008	
Chris Benoit Memorial Show	World Wrestling Entertainment	Vince McMahon	2007	Hosted on the June 25 edition of WWE Raw. Due to the circumstances of Benoit’s death, this show is not available as a rerun on the WWE Network. Also, as other countries received the airing later, a highlight show of John Cena’s title wins played in its place.
Tiger Khan Memorial Show	Total Mayhem Pro Wrestling	Evan Ginzburg	2007	
Antonio Peña Memorial Show	Asistencia Asesoría y Administración	Dorian Roldan	2007-	
Sensational Sherri Memorial Cup Tournament	Association de Lutte Féminine	Kim Leduc	2007-2008	
Dewey Robertson Memorial Tournament	Stranglehold Wrestling	Bill Skullion	2007	
Devil Bhudakahn Memorial Show	Turnbuckle Entertainment	Bobby Williams	2008, 2010	
Shinya Hashimoto Memorial Legacy Cup Tournament	Pro Wrestling Zero1	Yoshiyuki Nakamura; Steve Corino	2008-	
Danno O'Mahony Memorial Show	Irish Whip Wrestling		2008-	
Sean "Shocker" Evans Memorial Tournament	Pro Wrestling eXpress	Jim Miller	2008-	
Dynamite D Memorial Show	Santino Brothers Wrestling	Joey Kaos; Jezabel Romo; Robby Phoenix; Rico Dynamite; Famous B	2009-	
Walter "Killer" Kowalski Memorial Show	Multiple promotions	Richard Byrne	2008	Interpromotional event including Big Time Wrestling and the United States Wrestling Federation.
Mitsuharu Misawa Memorial Show	Pro Wrestling Noah	Akira Taue	2009	
Dennis Coralluzzo Invitational	NWA New Jersey	Ricky Otazu	2009	Coralluzzo was posthumously inducted into the NWA Hall of Fame.

=== 2010s ===
Name	Promotion	Organizer(s)	Years active	Notes
Marie Ewaschuk Memorial Show	Real Canadian Wrestling	Steve Ewaschuk	2010-	
Acid-Fest: A Tribute to Trent Acid	Combat Zone Wrestling	D. J. Hyde	2010-2011	Organized to both eulogize late independent professional wrestler Trent Acid, and to help pay for the funeral costs of said wrestler.
Dick Murdoch Memorial Tag Team Cup	Multiple promotions		2010	Interpromotional event including NWA Southwest and the Professional Wrestling Federation.
Kerry Brown Memorial Tournament	Steeltown Pro Wrestling	Rob Stardom	2010-2012	
A Nightmare To Remember	LN Promotions	Terry Lawler	2011-2012	
Andre Baker Memorial Show	NWA UK Hammerlock		2011-2012	
Joe Williams Memorial Trophy	World Association of Wrestling	Ricky Knight	2011	
El Bandito Memorial Tournament	Britannia Wrestling Promotions	Steve Saxon	2011–	
Brain Damage Memorial Show	Combat Zone Wrestling	D. J. Hyde	2012	
Samuel J. Thompson Memorial Tournament	Resistance Pro Wrestling	Billy Corgan	2013-2014	
Brad Armstrong Memorial Cup		Armstrong family	2013	
Brad Armstrong Memorial Show	Knoxville Wrestling Promotions	Armstrong family	2013-2014	
Nagaharu Imai Memorial Show	Multiple promotions		2013	Interpromotional event including Big Japan Pro Wrestling, Ice Ribbon, JWP Joshi Puroresu, Ladies Legend Pro-Wrestling, OZ Academy, Pro-Wrestling Diana, Pro Wrestling Wave Sendai Girls' Pro Wrestling and STARDOM.
Roland Alexander Memorial Show	All Pro Wrestling	Markus Mac	2013	
Rikidozan's Death 50th Anniversary Memorial Show	Multiple promotions		2013	Interpromotional event including All Japan Pro Wrestling, Big Japan Pro Wrestling and others.
Jumbo Tsuruta Memorial Show	Pro Wrestling NOAH	Akira Taue	2014	
Ryan Buckley Memorial Tournament	Proving Ground Pro		2015	
Takeshi Onaga Memorial Show: BJW Eternal Dream	Big Japan Pro Wrestling	Eiji Tosaka	2015	

=== 2020s ===
Name	Promotion	Organizer(s)	Years active	Notes
La Noche de Mr. Niebla	Consejo Mundial de Lucha Libre	Salvador Lutteroth III	2020	
Brodie Lee Celebration of Life	All Elite Wrestling	Tony Khan	2020	Hosted on the December 30 edition of AEW Dynamite.
Giant Baba Anniversary Show	All Japan Pro Wrestling; New Japan Pro-Wrestling; Big Japan Pro Wrestling		2021	
Hana Kimura Memorial Show	Multiple promotions	Kyoko Kimura	2021–present	
Jay Briscoe Celebration of Life	Ring of Honor	Tony Khan	2023	Hosted on ROH Honor Club and YouTube for free, on the ROH channel.
Bray Wyatt and Terry Funk Tribute Show	WWE		2023	The August 25, 2023 episode of WWE SmackDown was a tribute to active wrestler Wyatt and retired wrestler Funk, both of whom had died shortly before.
WrestleDream	All Elite Wrestling	Tony Khan	2023–present	Annual October pay-per-view event held in honor of New Japan Pro-Wrestling founder Antonio Inoki, who died in October 2022.
A Tribute to "The Butcher" Andy Williams	All Elite Wrestling	Tony Khan	2026	In honor of Andy Williams.
A Tribute to Pac	All Elite Wrestling	Tony Khan	2026	In honor of Pac.
