= Pro Wrestling Tees =

Exclusive apparel sold by professional wrestlers

- Website type: Professional wrestling merchandise
- Owner: Ryan Barkan
- Products: Designed shirts DVDs; Posters; Action figures
- Website: prowrestlingtees.com
- Commercial: Yes
- Launched: June 1, 2013

Pro Wrestling Tees is a website and store for professional wrestlers to sell their merchandise and is the largest website of its kind. The site regularly organizes meet ups for wrestlers and their fans around wrestling events. The company provides a platform for well-known professional wrestlers to sell their merchandise all over the world.

== History ==
The brand was founded in 2013 by Ryan Barkan headquartered on the North side of Chicago. It first started as a digital print shop in 2008, where Barkan sold custom T-shirts under the company One Hour Tees.

In 2010, Barkan received an email by a well-known independent wrestler Colt Cabana to help create a shirt for his friend CM Punk that would say, "I Broke Big Show’s Hand". After that, Ryan received more orders from Colt Cabana and later Colt offered Barkan a deal for promoting One Hour Tees on Colt's podcast, The Art of Wrestling. After getting featured on Colt's podcast, the brand bloomed and got the attention of the wrestlers such as The Young Bucks, Joey Ryan, Kevin Steen, Christopher Daniels and Frankie Kazarian.

In 2013, Ryan started the website ProWrestlingTees.com which is a marketplace of over 1,200 wrestlers who sell their own merchandise worldwide. In 2014, the company signed partnership deals with New Japan Pro-Wrestling.

In 2017, they signed a deal with Hot Topic to supply them the wrestling clothing and merchandise. In 2019, they become the official merchandise partner for All Elite Wrestling, launching ShopAEW.com.

== Business model ==
Barkan came up with the idea for ProWrestlingTees.com along with Colt Cabana to help wrestlers sell merchandise worldwide. The website was formed as a platform for the professional wrestlers and their families to design and sell their own apparel and other items including DVDs, posters and action figures. The wrestlers own their individual stores on the website and also own all the photos and products that they sell on ProWrestlingTees.com. The profits received from the merchandise directly go to the wrestlers or their families.

== Partnerships ==
The company has direct business with many famous wrestlers including: Chris Jericho, Hulk Hogan, Randy Savage, Ric Flair, The Young Bucks, CM Punk, Shawn Michaels, Cody Rhodes, Kenny Omega, Andre the Giant, Scott Hall, Mick Foley, Steve Austin, Roddy Piper, and many others. Colt Cabana was the first ever professional wrestler to have a store in the company's website.

== Sales figures ==
During All In weekend, Pro Wrestling Tees sold half a million dollars in merchandise. In April 2019, Pro Wrestling Tees announced they paid out over $5 million in royalties. On December 3, 2020, Pro Wrestling Tees owner Ryan Barkan stated on his Instagram page that Sting's AEW t-shirt quickly broke the single day record for t-shirt sales.

During the Brodie Lee Celebration of Life, Pro Wrestling Tees' Shop AEW store released a t-shirt in memory of Brodie Lee with all proceeds benefiting The Huber Family. In less than two hours, it set a new record for most shirts sold within 24 hours, breaking Sting's previous record. In just under four hours, it became the highest selling t-shirt of 2020, breaking Orange Cassidy's previous record.

== See also ==
- List of professional wrestling websites
