= Ten-bell salute =

Honor in professional wrestling

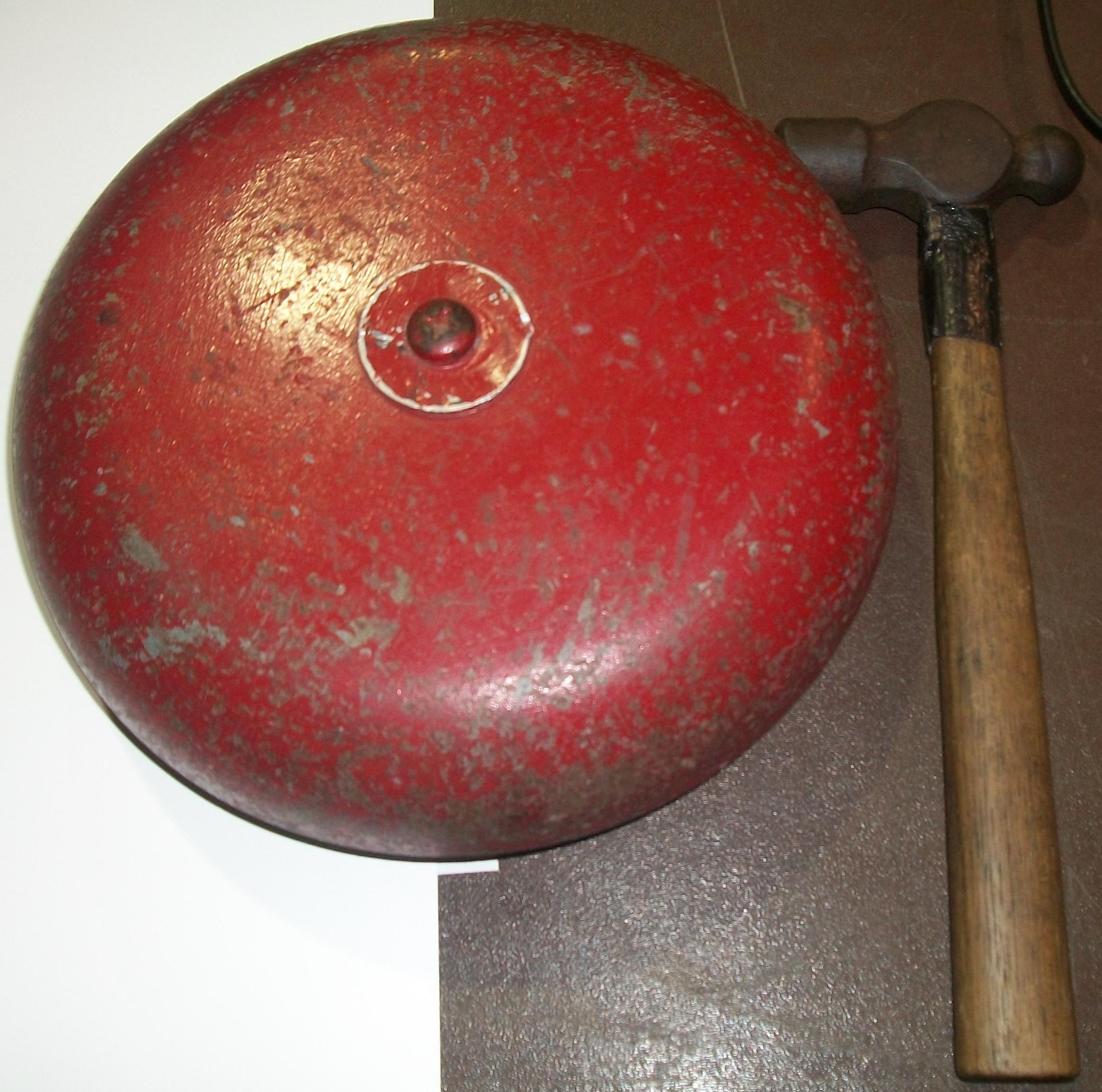
Traditional wrestling bell

In professional wrestling, a ten-bell salute is given to honor a wrestler who has died, especially when the wrestler is a current member of the promotion or a distinguished former member of the promotion. It is the professional wrestling equivalent of a three-volley salute. It is typically given at the beginning of a card, with the current members of the promotion either in the entryway, in the ring and/or around the ring. Both the wrestlers and audience observe a moment of silence while the bell is rung. A memorial video would also be played before a moment of applause would follow.

In Japanese wrestling, ten-bell salutes (“ten-count gongs”) are held not only for deceased wrestlers but also for retiring wrestlers to mark the end of their careers. Retirement ten-count gongs are often preceded with a retirement ceremony for the retiree where they are presented with gifts, flowers and career memorabilia from the active roster, high-ranking officials of the promotion and special guests.

== Honorees ==
=== World Wrestling Federation/Entertainment/WWE ===
WWE (formerly known as the World Wrestling Federation and World Wrestling Entertainment) has included several ten-bell salutes in its television broadcasts and live events. Some of the honorees include:

- David Von Erich (1984, acute enteritis)
- André the Giant (1993, heart failure)
- Brian Pillman (1997, heart failure)
- Rick Rude (1999, heart failure)
- Owen Hart (1999, accidental fall during entrance stunt)
- Gorilla Monsoon (1999, heart failure)
- "The British Bulldog" Davey Boy Smith (2002, heart attack)
- Lord Alfred Hayes (2005, complications from a stroke)
- Eddie Guerrero (2005, heart failure)
- The Fabulous Moolah (2007, heart attack)
- Paul Bearer (2013, heart attack)
- Ultimate Warrior (2014, heart attack)
- Verne Gagne (2015, complications from Alzheimer's disease)
- Dusty Rhodes (2015, kidney failure)
- Roddy Piper (2015, heart attack)
- Bobby Heenan (2017, complications from throat cancer)
- Bruno Sammartino (2018, multiple organ failure)
- Jim Neidhart (2018, head injury from fall)
- Gene Okerlund (2019, complications from fall)
- Rocky Johnson (2020, blood clot)
- Pat Patterson (2020, liver failure)
- Terry Funk and Bray Wyatt (2023, unspecified and heart attack respectively)
- Hulk Hogan (2025, heart attack)

In addition to honoring former wrestlers, several ten-bell salutes have been performed for non-wrestlers or to memorialize tragedies:

- WWF Events following the September 11, 2001 attacks, to honor those who were killed in the attacks on New York City and Washington, D.C. In 2018 on the 17 year anniversary of the event another 11-bell salute was performed.
- On December 16, 2012, a 26-bell salute was given at the beginning of WWE's TLC: Tables, Ladders & Chairs pay-per-view in tribute to the 26 victims of the Sandy Hook Elementary School shooting that had taken place two days earlier in WWE's home state of Connecticut.
- On May 30, 2016, the Memorial Day edition of Raw opened with a ten-bell salute in honor of fallen military members.
- On January 15, 2018, Raw opened with a ten-bell salute in honor of Martin Luther King Jr.
- On December 3, 2018, Raw opened with a ten bell salute in honor of former president George H. W. Bush, who had died a few days prior.
- On August 5, 2019, Raw opened with a ten bell salute in honor of the victims of the shootings in El Paso and Dayton that happened a few days prior.

==== Ten-bell salutes within WWF/WWE storylines ====
While ten-bell salutes have typically been reserved for real-life deaths, it has been used in kayfabe on multiple occasions in WWE history (see worked shoot). The most recent instance was in June 2007 for Mr. McMahon (WWE chairman Vince McMahon's on-screen persona), as part of an angle in which he was inside a limousine that exploded, and was presumed dead.

In 1988, Harley Race was "honored" with ten bells as part of a promo by Bobby "The Brain" Heenan, wherein Heenan accused Hulk Hogan of causing serious injuries to Race. This angle grew out of a match during which Race was legitimately injured during a match against Hogan, due to a mistimed move, and was forced to take a hiatus.

On a Raw Is War broadcast shortly after the Royal Rumble in January 1998, Paul Bearer and Kane rang the bell ten times in ring to mock The Undertaker, with whom they were feuding at the time. Their actions grew from an incident at the Royal Rumble where, in the storyline, Kane and Bearer had locked The Undertaker in a casket and set it ablaze, presumably killing The Undertaker. However, that failed when The Undertaker returned and accepted Kane's challenge for a fight, setting the stage for WrestleMania XIV.

In 1999, a ten-bell salute was given to Big Show's father, who was said to have died of cancer as part of a storyline. In reality, he had died of stomach cancer in 1992.

In 2020, The Undertaker officially retired after 30 years of performing for the promotion. During his retirement ceremony at Survivor Series on November 22, the ten-bell salute was given for The Undertaker character.

=== Extreme Championship Wrestling ===
In Extreme Championship Wrestling (ECW) at the 1998 CyberSlam event, a ten-bell salute was given in remembrance of Louie Spicolli, who died from an accidental drug overdose on February 15, 1998.

Also in ECW, a year later, a fan booed Rick Rude's 10 bell salute at an ECW show at the Elks Lodge. Bubba Ray Dudley got angry and swore at the fan for being disrespectful. Paul Heyman gave the fan double her money back and told her "to get the fuck out!"

=== Ring of Honor ===
In 2009, Ring of Honor (ROH) held a ten-bell salute for Mitsuharu Misawa.

On the September 8, 2026 tapings of Ring of Honor, ROH and AEW owner Tony Khan opened the show with a ten-bell salute to Andy "The Butcher" Williams who died three days earlier.

The September 28, 2026 tapings of ROH HonorClub opened the show with a ten-bell salute to Pac who died the previous day.

=== Total Nonstop Action Wrestling ===
Arguably the best-known ten-bell salute in Total Nonstop Action Wrestling (TNA) is that given to Chris Candido at Hard Justice in May 2005. Candido had died of a blood clot due to complications of leg surgery two weeks earlier.

There was also a ten-bell salute at a TNA event in Amsterdam, New York on May 20, 2011, in honor of "Macho Man" Randy Savage, who had died that morning.

At Knockouts Knockdown in 2021, Lexie Fyfe began a 10-bell salute in honor of Daffney and led a "Thank You Daffney" chant.

On January 13, 2023, Hard To Kill began with a ten-bell salute to former Impact commentator Don West.

On August 27, 2023, Emergence opened with a ten-bell salute to commemorate Bray Wyatt and Terry Funk, both of whom had died earlier in the week.

On June 28, 2026, Slammiversary opened with a ten-bell salute to Joe Doering, who died two days earlier.

=== All Elite Wrestling ===
On December 30, 2020, All Elite Wrestling (AEW)'s Brodie Lee Celebration of Life memorial event had a ten-bell salute in honor of Brodie Lee who died of a non-COVID-19 lung issue, later revealed to be idiopathic pulmonary fibrosis, that month.

On the May 6, 2026 episode of Dynamite, AEW held a ten-bell salute for former Turner Broadcasting System and World Championship Wrestling (WCW) owner Ted Turner who died earlier that day, with former WCW employees Tony Schiavone and Sting providing a eulogy for Turner.

On the September 12, 2026 episode of Collision, AEW held a ten-bell salute in honor of Andy "The Butcher" Williams who died after collapsing following a match the previous week.

The September 30 of Dynamite, which was a special episode titled "A Tribute to Pac" event held a ten-bell salute in honor of Pac who died three days prior.

=== New Japan Pro-Wrestling ===
On April 14, 2000, Masakazu Fukuda suffered a fatal head injury during a match with Katsuyori Shibata in the Young Lion Cup Tournament after taking a flying elbow drop. He was rushed to the hospital, but died five days later on April 19 due to a brain hemorrhage; he was 27 years old. The rest of the tournament was dedicated to Masakuza's memory. He was honored with a ten-bell salute and a tribute show in September of that year.

On October 10, 2022, New Japan Pro-Wrestling held a ten-bell salute for its founder Antonio Inoki who passed away on October 1.

=== Usage in other promotions ===
The 2001 video game Legends of Wrestling includes a 10 bell salute at the end of its credits dedicated to Brian Pillman, Eddie Gilbert, and Fritz, David, Michael and Kerry of the Von Erich Family. All of them had appeared as playable characters in the game.

Combat Zone Wrestling (CZW) at Cage of Death 7 did a ten bell salute for Eddie Guerrero. A fan rudely interrupted saying "Fuck that!" during the salute and was kicked out.

Lucha Underground gave a ten-bell salute in remembrance of Perro Aguayo, Jr. on March 21, 2015, the night after Aguayo tragically died in the ring due to a freak accident that happened during a tag team match for The Crash in Tijuana.

On the morning of June 18, 2010, Trent Acid was found dead at his Philadelphia home by his mother. It was later determined that he had died from a drug overdose. At a Ring of Honor show in Buffalo, New York that night, a ten-bell salute was given to Acid.

Richard "Rick" Wilson, known professionally as The Renegade, committed suicide on February 23, 1999. He was 33 years old. His death was announced eight days later on Nitro, where he was honored with an "In Memory..." graphic at the beginning of the show and given a ten-bell salute.

On December 15, 2001, Combat Zone Wrestling's Cage of Death 3 show had a ten bell salute for Russ Haas, with some wrestlers wearing black armbands, and others taping "RH" on their wrestling boots.

Major League Wrestling (MLW) held a ten-bell salute for Miss Elizabeth in 2003.

At MCW Shane Shamrock Cup 11 on July 30, 2011, a ten-bell salute was observed in honor of Tim Burke's death. At the time of his MCW Hall of Fame induction, the company acknowledged the contributions of Burke and Dennis Wipprecht stating that "had it not been for these two men there may not be wrestling in Maryland today".

Brian Hildebrand died from bowel cancer on September 8, 1999 at the age of 37. He refereed one last match at a local independent show mere days before his death. Hildebrand's death was briefly acknowledged on the following episode of Thunder, but the first WCW event to have taken place after his death was a house show on September 11 at the Baltimore Arena, which was held in his honor with a ten-bell salute. Late in the show, friends Chris Benoit, Dean Malenko, and Shane Douglas (known as The Revolution) shared heartfelt words about Hildebrand and dedicated the show to him.

Ohio Valley Wrestling (OVW) held a 10-bell salute to honor Matt Cappotelli after his death in 2018.

All Japan Pro Wrestling held a ten-bell salute for The Dynamite Kid in 2018.

On June 21, 2020, World Wonder Ring Stardom held a ten-bell salute for Hana Kimura at Stardom is Again, the first event for the promotion since the COVID-19 pandemic related shut down of the wrestling industry in Japan and Kamura's suicide death on May 23, 2020.

On May 12, 2025, Game Changer Wrestling's sister brand Jersey Championship wrestling held a ten-bell salute in honor of Sabu who had his last match in the promotion at Joey Janela's Spring Break 9.

== In boxing ==
The ten-bell salute is also used in boxing to honor deceased boxers, where it is also known as the "final ten-count".

== See also ==
- 21-gun salute
- Three-volley salute
