= Yuka Sakazaki =

Japanese professional wrestler (born 1992)

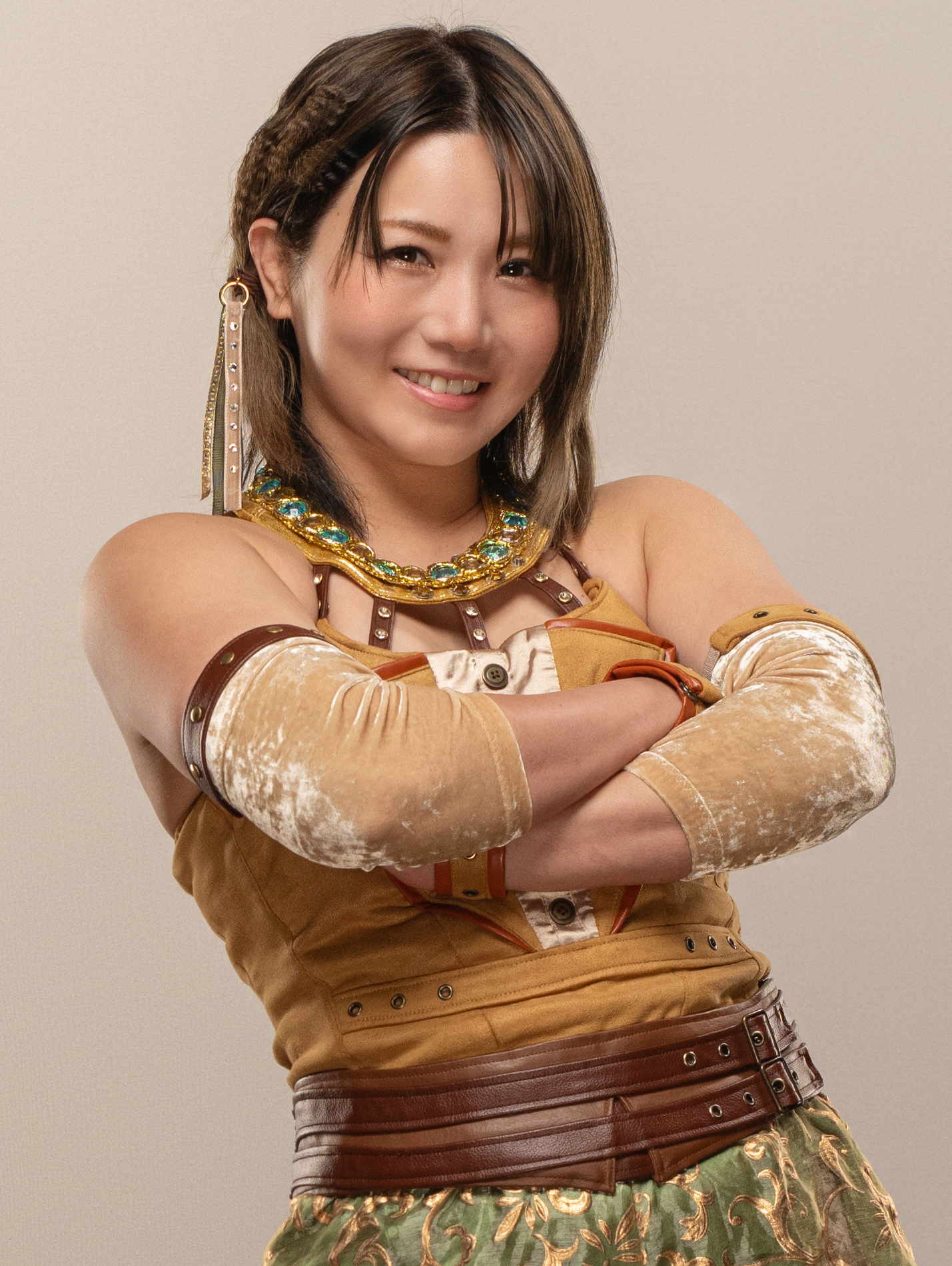
- Sakazaki in 2023

Personal information
- Born: December 27, 1992 (age 33)
- Spouse: Konosuke Takeshita (m. 2025)

Professional wrestling career
- Ring name(s): Mil Clown; Yuka Sakazaki
- Billed height: 158 cm (5 ft 2 in)
- Billed weight: 58 kg (128 lb)
- Billed from: "South Town"
- Trained by: DDT Dojo
- Debut: December 1, 2013

Yuka Sakazaki (坂崎 ユカ, Sakazaki Yuka; born December 27, 1992) is a Japanese professional wrestler. She is signed to All Elite Wrestling (AEW). She is known for her tenure with Tokyo Joshi Pro Wrestling, where she is a three-time Princess of Princess Champion, and a record-tying four-time Princess Tag Team Champion.

== Early life ==
She attended a training school with aspirations for comedy. She later switched to wrestling.

== Professional wrestling career ==
=== Tokyo Joshi Pro-Wrestling (2013–2023) ===
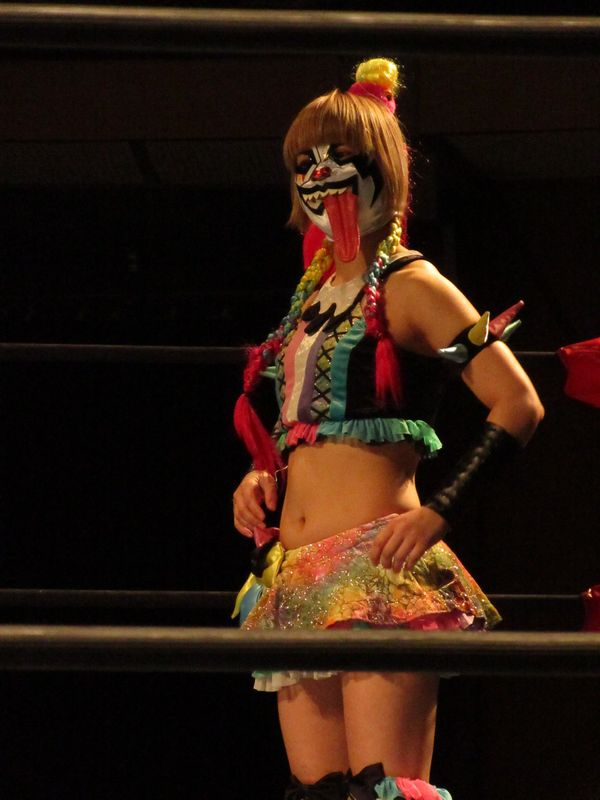
Sakazaki as Mil Clown in October 2016

Sakazaki made her professional wrestling debut for Tokyo Joshi Pro-Wrestling (TJPW), winning a tag team match on December 1, 2013.

In the summer of 2014, Sakazaki participated in the first Tokyo Princess Cup, defeating Kanna in the first round before losing to eventual champion Nonoko in the semifinals.

On June 4, 2017, Sakazaki defeated Yuu to become the Tokyo Princess of Princess Champion for the first time. On August 26, at Brand New Wrestling ~ The Beginning Of A New Era, Sakazaki lost the title in her first defense against Reika Saiki, ending her reign at 83 days. Throughout September and October, Sakazaki and her tag team partner Shoko Nakajima participated in a tournament to crown the first Tokyo Princess Tag Team Champions. The two won their first round and semifinal matches in the tournament and eventually defeated Maho Kurone and Rika Tatsumi in the finals to win the tag titles. On February 3, 2018, Sakazaki and Nakajima lost the tag titles to Neo Biishiki-gun (Azusa Christie and Sakisama). Later that year, Sakazaki again competed in the Tokyo Princess Cup, winning her first three matchups before losing to Yuu in the finals. On August 4, Sakazaki teamed with Mizuki (under the name Magical Sugar Rabbits) in the one-day Yeah! Metcha Tag Tournament, which they won by defeating Hyper Misao and Nakajima, the latter of whom Sakazaki won the Tokyo Princess Tag Team Championship with. Three weeks later, Sakazaki and Mizuki defeated Maki Itoh and Reika Saiki to win the vacant tag titles, marking Sakazaki's second reign as champion. The two held the title for ten months until they were defeated by Neo Biishiki-gun.

On November 3, 2019, at DDT Pro-Wrestling's Ultimate Party, Sakazaki defeated Shoko Nakajima to claim her second Princess of Princess Championship. On January 4, 2021, at Tokyo Joshi Pro '21, Sakazaki lost the title to Rika Tatsumi, ending her second reign at 428 days. On October 9, at Wrestle Princess II, Sakazaki and Mizuki defeated Neo Biishiki-gun to win the Princess Tag Team Championship for the second time. At CyberFight Festival 2022 on June 12, Sakazaki fought Nakajima for the Princess of Princess Championship in a losing effort. On July 9, at Summer Sun Princess, Magical Sugar Rabbits lost the tag titles to Reiwa Ban AA Cannon (Saki Akai and Yuki Arai), ending their second reign at 273 days. On August 14, Sakazaki defeated Miu Watanabe to win the Tokyo Princess Cup for the first time. On October 9, at Wrestle Princess III, Sakazaki defeated Nakajima to regain the Princess of Princess Championship for a third time. On March 18, 2023, at Grand Princess '23, Sakazaki dropped the title to Mizuki, ending her third reign at 160 days. Thirteen days later, at TJPW Live In Los Angeles, Magical Sugar Rabbits defeated 121000000 (Maki Itoh and Miyu Yamashita) to win the Princess Tag Team Championship for a record-setting third time, giving Sakazaki a record-tying fourth reign with the title. On May 8, TJPW announced that Sakazaki will be graduating from the promotion, her final show taking place on December 1 and will be based in the United States the following year. On June 9, Sakazaki vacated the tag titles after being diagnosed with a neck injury.

=== All Elite Wrestling (2019–present) ===
In 2019, All Elite Wrestling (AEW) announced that Sakazaki would wrestle at Double or Nothing, competing in the six women tag-team match. She participated in a triple threat match at Fyter Fest on June 29, losing to Riho after she pinned Nyla Rose. On February 5, 2020, Sakazaki made her debut on Dynamite defeating Britt Baker and being attacked by her after the match. After that, she stopped appearing for the promotion due to travel restrictions during the COVID-19 pandemic.

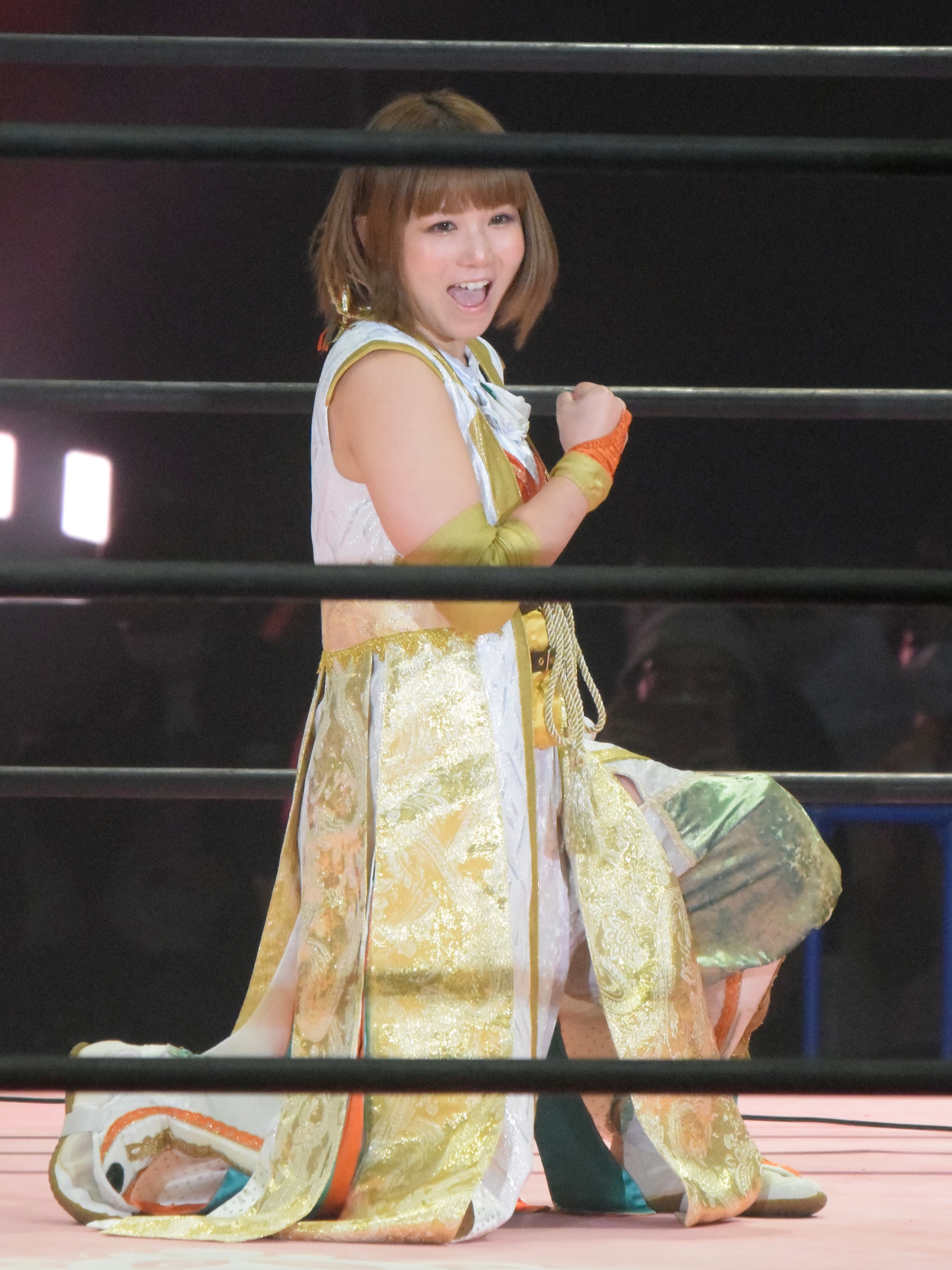
Sakazaki in October 2021

On February 15, 2021, Sakazaki made her AEW return to participate in the AEW Women's World Championship Eliminator Tournament. In the opening round of the Japanese side of the bracket, Sakazaki was victorious over Mei Suruga. She defeated Emi Sakura in the Japanese bracket semifinals on February 22 to advance to the next round, where she lost to Ryo Mizunami on an all-women's B/R Live special on February 28. On July 12, Sakazaki returned to competing in AEW shows and she appeared on Dark: Elevation, facing KiLynn King which she was victorious. On the July 14 special edition episode of Dynamite titled Fyter Fest, Sakazaki's first time appearing on Dynamite in 16 months, Sakazaki faced Penelope Ford and again was victorious. On May 6, 2022, Sakazaki returned to AEW competing on Rampage by taking part in the Owen Hart Cup, where she faced Riho and lost.

On April 6, 2024, Sakazaki returned to AEW by defeating Trish Adora on Collision. After the match, she gets confronted by Serena Deeb on stage. Two weeks later on Rampage, Sakazaki's first time appearing on Rampage in 23 months, she defeated Emi Sakura. During the match, Sakazaki suffered a leg injury after tumbling outside from the top rope. She made her return on the September 14 episode of Collision, defeating Deeb and getting into a confrontation with AEW Women's World Champion "The Glamour" Mariah May afterwards. On the following Dynamite, Sakazaki teamed up with Queen Aminata and defeated Deeb and May by disqualification, after being hit in the head by May's Women's World title belt. On September 25, at Dynamite: Grand Slam, she failed to beat May for the title.

On January 25, 2025, at Collision: Homecoming, Sakazaki won a four-way match involving Queen Aminata, Serena Deeb and Deonna Purrazzo (who she pinned), becoming the number one contender to Mercedes Moné's AEW TBS Championship, but failed to win the title on the January 30 episode of Dynamite.

=== Ring of Honor (2023–present) ===
On the January 16, 2023, episode of Dark: Elevation, Sakazaki returned and saved Zeda Zhang from an attack by ROH Women's World Champion Athena after their match. Two weeks later, Sakazaki teamed with Skye Blue and fought Athena and Diamante in a winning effort.

On January 18, 2023 (aired January 26), Sakazaki officially made her Ring of Honor (ROH) debut by defeating Sandra Moone at The Jay Briscoe Celebration of Life special. On the March 30 episode of ROH Honor Club TV, Sakazaki saved Emi Sakura from an attack by ROH Women's World Champion Athena after their title match. A day later, at Supercard of Honor, Sakazaki fought Athena for the ROH Women's World title in a losing effort.

On the April 25, 2024, episode of ROH Honor Club TV, Sakazaki's first time appearing on Honor Club TV in 12 months, she made her return and defeated Leila Grey. On July 11, 2025, Sakazaki made her return at Supercard of Honor, competing in a Worldwide Women's Wild Card four-way match for the interim ROH Women's World Television Championship, which was won by Mina Shirakawa. On August 29 at Death Before Dishonor, she was announced as an entrant in a tournament to crown the inaugural ROH Women's Pure Championship. On the November 28 episode of ROH Honor Club TV, Sakazaki defeated Serena Deeb in the first round, but was eliminated in the semifinals by Billie Starkz the following week.

On the April 17, 2026, episode of ROH Honor Club TV, Sakazaki defeated Viva Van in a Survival of the Fittest qualifying match to be inserted in a six-way match for Athena's ROH Women's World Championship at Supercard of Honor on May 16. At the event, she was eliminated third in the match by Billie Starkz.

== Personal life ==
Amidst her announcement of her graduating from TJPW, she announced that she would be permanently moving to the United States in 2024 to pursue work.

On May 27, 2025, Sakazaki announced her marriage to wrestler Konosuke Takeshita. Together, they have a dog named Kenshiro.

== Championships and accomplishments ==
- Pro Wrestling Illustrated
  - Ranked No. 59 of the top 150 female wrestlers in the PWI Women's 150 in 2021
- Tokyo Joshi Pro Wrestling
  - Princess of Princess Championship (3 times) (Note: Sakazaki's first reign was when the championship was called the Tokyo Princess of Princess Championship.)
  - Princess Tag Team Championship (4 times, inaugural) (Note: Sakazaki's first two reigns were when the championship was called the Tokyo Princess Tag Team Championship.) – with Shoko Nakajima (1) and Mizuki (3)
  - Tokyo Princess Cup (2022)
  - Tokyo Princess Tag Team Championship Tournament (2017) – with Shoko Nakajima
