= Mike Lockwood Memorial Show =

- Promotion: Pro Wrestling Iron
- Date: November 15, 2003
- City: Lathrop, California
- Venue: Lathrop Community Center

The Mike Lockwood Memorial Show was a professional wrestling memorial event produced by the Pro Wrestling Iron (PWI) promotion, which took place on November 15, 2003 at the Lathrop Community Center in Lathrop, California. It was the first of two memorial shows held in memory of Mike Lockwood, who committed suicide at his home in Navarre, Florida on two weeks earlier, with a second show, the Mike Lockwood Memorial Tournament, run by New Breed Wrestling Association in South Bend, Indiana two years later. All proceeds raised from the event, and subsequent DVD sales, were donated to Lockwood's widow Shannon and their 7-year-old daughter Patty. Six Japanese-style professional wrestling matches were featured on the event's card, though no gimmicks or ongoing storylines were part of the show.

The main event was a 6-man tag team match between Donovan Morgan, Frank Murdoch and Vinny Massaro, accompanied by Patty Lockwood, and Hook Bomberry and the Thomaselli Brothers (Vito and Sal Thomaselli). Another featured match was Pogo the Clown, competing without makeup and under his real name Joe Applebaumer, against Maliki, which Pogo won. "The Raging Bull" Manny Fernandez came out of retirement, at age 51, for a "one-night only" appearance to defeat Lars Dauger, and Mike Lockwood's original trainer Shane Kody teaming with Big Ugly to beat Bart Blaxton and Ryan Drago. All the wrestler's who participated on the show wore armbands with “Mikey” on them.

== Results ==
November 15, 2003 in Lathrop, California (Lathrop Community Center)

No.	Results	Stipulations	Times
1	Tony Jones defeated Jason Moody	Singles match	02:33
2	Flaco Loco and Super Diablo defeated Apollo Khan and Jet Taylor	Tag Team match	11:35
3	Joe Applebaumer defeated Maliki	Singles match	06:10
4	Manny Fernandez defeated Lars Dauger	Singles match	07:08
5	Shane Kody and Big Ugly defeated Bart Blaxton and Ryan Drago	Tag Team match	14:38
6	Donovan Morgan, Frank Murdoch and Vinny Massaro (with Patty Lockwood) defeated Hook Bomberry and the Thomaselli Brothers (Vito and Sal Thomaselli)	6-man tag team match	21:53
