= Terry Gordy Memorial Show =

2001 Legends of Pro Wrestling event

- Promotion: Legends of Pro Wrestling (LPW)
- Date: August 11, 2001
- City: Birmingham, Alabama
- Venue: Boutwell Auditorium

The Terry Gordy Memorial Show was a professional wrestling memorial event produced by the Legends of Pro Wrestling (LPW) promotion, which took place on August 11, 2001 at the Boutwell Auditorium in Birmingham, Alabama. The event was held in honor of Terry "Bam Bam" Gordy who had died of a heart attack at his home outside Chattanooga, Tennessee the previous month. Promoter Linda Marx Keebles promised that 20% of the proceeds would be donated to Gordy's family to help cover funeral costs and guaranteed at least a $1,000 donation. Nine professional wrestling matches were featured on the event's card, with two including championships.

The main event was a standard wrestling match between Gordy's Fabulous Freebirds teammate P.S. Michael Hayes and Ray Gordy, and the challengers, "Dirty White Boy" Tony Anthony and "Nightmare" Ken Wayne, both among the top "heels" in the Continental Championship Wrestling during the 1980s. Ray Gordy had originally been scheduled to wrestle with his father and Hayes, who had been in retirement since 1995, offered to fill in after Terry's death. Another featured match was "Wildfire" Tommy Rich versus "Nature Boy" Buddy Landel, which Rich won. Robert Gibson defeated "Beautiful" Bobby Eaton, and Jimmy Golden defeated The Honky Tonk Man, with outside interference from Robert Fuller and Robert Gibson, to win the LPW United States Championship. In a 6-man "Southern Street Fight", Robert Fuller, Jimmy Golden and Jerry Stubbs defeated "Bullet" Bob Armstrong, Scott Armstrong and Chad Fuller. Chad Fuller was accompanied to the ring by his father Ron Fuller, who was unable to compete due to a shoulder injury, both father and son later turned on the Armstrong's and costing them the match.

The event featured many wrestlers with whom he worked with throughout his career, mostly from the National Wrestling Alliance, as well as from the World Wrestling Federation and local independent wrestlers. Also during the event, Mr. Wrestling II gave an in-ring interview with his memories of Gordy and Triple H, who was in Birmingham undergoing rehabilitation with Dr. James Andrews for a knee injury, made a surprise appearance at the end of the main event. The show, and the backstage goings-on, was later covered by the Pro Wrestling Torch Newsletter.

== Results ==
No.	Results	Stipulations
1	Christian Steele defeated River DeAngelo via disqualification	Singles match
2	Demon Master defeated Buzz the Rodeo Clown	Singles match
3	Candi Devine defeated Robbie Rage (c)	Singles match for the UWA Women's Championship
4	Robert Gibson defeated Bobby Eaton	Singles match
5	Jimmy Golden defeated The Honky Tonk Man (c)	Singles match for the UWA United States Championship
6	Tommy Rich defeated Buddy Landel via disqualification	Singles match
7	Bull Buchanan defeated "Hot Stuff" Eric Brown	Singles match
8	Robert Fuller, Jimmy Golden and Jerry Stubbs defeated "Bullet" Bob Armstrong, Scott Armstrong and Chad Fuller	6-man Southern Street Fight tag team match
9	P.S. Michael Hayes and Ray Gordy defeated Tony Anthony and "Nightmare" Ken Wayne	Tag team match
(c) / – the champion(s) heading into the match

== See also ==
- List of professional wrestling memorial shows
