= Mike Lockwood Memorial Tournament =

- Promotion: New Breed Wrestling Association
- Date: March 18, 2005
- City: South Bend, Indiana
- Venue: ZB Falcons

The Mike Lockwood Memorial Tournament was a professional wrestling memorial event produced by the New Breed Wrestling Association (NBWA) promotion, which took place on March 18, 2005 at ZB Falcons in South Bend, Indiana. It was the second of two memorial shows held in memory of Mike Lockwood, who committed suicide at his home in Navarre, Florida on November 6, 2003, with a first show run by Pro Wrestling Iron, the Mike Lockwood Memorial Show, in Lathrop, California two years earlier. Eight professional wrestling matches were featured on the event's card, with one including championships.

Michael Modest won the tournament by winning three matches at the event. Over the course of the evening, he defeated Dustin Thomas in the quarter-finals, the Shark Boy in the semi-finals and Jamie Noble in the final match. In addition to the tournament, the main event was a standard wrestling match for the NBWA Heavyweight Championship between the champion, Nigel McGuiness, and the challenger, B. J. Whitmer, in which Whitmer won the championship.

== Results ==
March 18, 2005 in South Bend, Indiana (ZB Falcons)

#	Results	Stipulations	Times
1	Jamie Noble defeated Silas Young	Mike Lockwood Memorial Tournament Quarter-Final match	n/a
2	Shark Boy defeated Brad Bradley	Mike Lockwood Memorial Tournament Quarter-Final match	n/a
3	Michael Modest defeated Dustin Thomas	Mike Lockwood Memorial Tournament Quarter-Final match	n/a
4	Ace Steel defeated Danny Daniels	Mike Lockwood Memorial Tournament Quarter-Final match	n/a
5	Jamie Noble defeated Ace Steel	Mike Lockwood Memorial Tournament Semi-Final match	n/a
6	Michael Modest defeated Shark Boy	Mike Lockwood Memorial Tournament Semi-Final match	n/a
7	Michael Modest defeated Jamie Noble	Mike Lockwood Memorial Tournament Final match	n/a
8	B. J. Whitmer defeated Nigel McGuinness (c)	Singles match for the NBWA Heavyweight Championship	n/a

=== Tournament brackets ===
This was a one-night tournament which took place on March 18, 2005. The tournament brackets were:

Quarterfinals
Jamie Noble	Pin
Silas Young
Ace Steel	Pin
Danny Daniels
Shark Boy	Pin
Brad Bradley
Michael Modest	Pin
Dustin Thomas

Semifinals
Jamie Noble	Pin
Ace Steel
Shark Boy
Michael Modest	Pin

Finals
Jamie Noble
Michael Modest	Pin
