= Rikidozan Memorial Show =

Japanese professional wrestling event

The Rikidozan Memorial Show was a professional wrestling event held in 1996, and again in 2000, as a tribute to "the father of puroresu," Rikidozan (also known as Mitsuhiro Momota). Both shows were considered major events in Japan and had involvement from virtually every major wrestling promotion at the time. The first show was held in Yokohama, Japan at the Yokohama Arena on June 30, 1996, with 16,000 in attendance. The show featured interpromotional matches of wrestlers from All Japan Pro Wrestling, Big Japan Pro Wrestling, Frontier Martial-Arts Wrestling, IWA Kakutoshijuku, International Wrestling Association, Japan Pro Shooting, Kitao Dojo, Michinoku Pro, New Japan Pro-Wrestling, Professional Wrestling Fujiwara Gumi, Samurai Project, UWFi, Wrestle Association R and joshi promotions GAEA Japan, JWP Joshi Puroresu and Ladies Legend Pro-Wrestling. In the main event, Genichiro Tenryu (WAR) and Tatsumi Fujinami (NJPW) defeated Koki Kitihara (WAR) and Riki Choshu (NJPW) in a tag team match. On the undercard, Keiji Mutoh & Kensuke Sasaki defeated Shinya Hashimoto & Junji Hirata and a "PWFG vs. UWFI" match between Yoshiaki Fujiwara and Yoji Anjoh resulted in a double-countout.

One of the largest wrestling events of the decade, the first show received some criticism for restricting FMW wrestlers to traditional puroresu as "garbage wrestling" was prohibited. Of the 15 promotions that participated, a noticeable gap between mainstream and independent promotions was also apparent.

A second show was held four years later on March 11, 2000, again held in the Yokohama Arena, and attended by between 13,000 and 9,000 fans. The promotions involved included Battlarts, Big Japan Pro Wrestling, Frontier Martial-Arts Wrestling, Go Gudan, Michinoku Pro, New Japan Pro-Wrestling, Pancrase, Takada Dojo, Toryumon, Universal Fighting Arts Organization, WAR and joshi promotions All Japan Women's Pro-Wrestling, JWP Project and Neo Japan Ladies Pro-Wrestling. Genichiro Tenryu (WAR) & BB Jones defeated Shinya Hashimoto (NJPW) & Naoya Ogawa (UFO) in the main event. The undercard matches included Yoji Anjoh defeating Tarzan Goto as well as a tag team match which saw Team Big Japan (Ryuji Yamikawa & Tomoaki Honma) defeat Team FMW (Naoki Yamazaki & H). Also on the card was a celebrity "exhibition" match which saw Japanese pop star Hideaki Takizawa pin Antonio Inoki. Both the first and second memorial shows were released on VHS in 2000 and on DVD in 2004, the latter as part of a 6-part collection entitled Rikidozan - Puro Founder.

A third show was held by Mitsuharu Misawa and Pro Wrestling Noah at Korakuen Hall on December 11, 2003. The event was headlined by Rikidozan's son, Mitsuo Momota, who teamed with Tsuyoshi Kikuchi against KENTA and Naomichi Marufuji for the Global Honoured Champions Tag Team Championship.

== Show results ==
=== 1996 Rikidozan Memorial Show ===
June 30, 1996 in Yokohama, Japan (Yokohama Arena)

No.	Results	Stipulations	Times
1	Ryuma Go & Takeshi Miyamoto defeated Samurai Max & Fumio Akiyama when Go pinned Max	Tag team match (Samurai Project)	14:35
2	Goro Tsurumi defeated The Mummy by pinfall	Singles match (IWA Kakutoshijuku)	07:09
3	Gladiator & Hisakatsu Oya defeated Koji Nakayama & Masato Tanaka when Gladiator pinned Nakayama	Tag team match (FMW)	12:13
4	Tarzan Goto defeated Takashi Okano by pinfall	Singles match (IWA Japan)	16:11
5	Seiji Yamakawa & Kendo Nagasaki defeated Yuichi Toniguchi & Shoji Nakamaki when Yamakawa pinned Toniguchi	Tag team match (Big Japan)	12:58
6	Shinobu Kandori & Michiko Omukai defeated Eagle Sawai & Michiko Nagashima when Kandori pinned Nagashima	Tag team match (LLPW)	12:46
7	Chigusa Nagayo, Hiromi Yagi & Hikari Fukuoka defeated Dynamite Kansai, Bomber Hikari & Toshie Uematsu when Nagayo pinned Uematsu	6-woman tag team match (GAEA/JWP)	13:23
8	Mitsuo Momota defeated Masao Inoue by pinfall	Singles match (AJPW)	08:35
9	Team WAR (Jado & Hiromichi Fuyuki) defeated Team Kitao (Koji Kitao & Masaaki Mochizuki) when Fuyuki pinned Mochizuki	Tag team match (WAR/Team Kitao)	12:26
10	Satoru Sayama vs. Tiger Mask ended in a time-limit draw	Singles match (Japan Pro Shooting/Michinoku Pro)	33:00
11	Yoshiaki Fujiwara vs. Yoji Anjoh ended in a double-countout	Singles match (PWFG/UWFI)	—
12	Keiji Mutoh & Kensuke Sasaki defeated Shinya Hashimoto & Junji Hirata when Mutoh pinned Hirata	Tag team match (NJPW)	14:51
13	Genichiro Tenryu & Tatsumi Fujinami defeated Koki Kitihara & Riki Choshu when Tenryu pinned Kitihara	Tag team match (WAR/NJPW)	13:51

=== 2000 Rikidozan Memorial Show ===
March 11, 2000 in Yokohama, Japan (Yokohama Arena)

No.	Results	Stipulations	Times
1	Magnum Tokyo (Toryumon) & Gran Hamada (Michinoku Pro) defeated Team Toryumon (Sumo Fuji & Cima) when Tokyo pinned Fuji	Tag team match (Toryumon/Michinoku Pro)	18:25
2	Naoki Sano defeated Yuki Ishikawa by pinfall	Singles match (Takada Dojo/Battlearts)	11:30
3	Yuki Kondo defeated Kan Tenjun via submission with a chokehold	Singles match (Pancrase)	00:40
4	Command Bolshoi (JWP) & Yumiko Hotta (AJW) defeated Team JWP (Ran Yu-Yu & Kayoko Haruyama) when Bolshoi pinned Haruyama	Tag team match (JWP/AJW)	10:10
5	Team New Ladies (Yoshiko Tamura, Yuka Nakamura & Kyoko Inoue) defeated Team JWP (Dynamite Kansai, Tsubasa Kuragaki & Azumi Hyuga) when Tamura forced Kuragaki to submit	6-woman match (New Ladies/JWP)	16:36
6	Yoshiaki Fujiwara defeated Satoru Sayama via submission with a knee-lock	Singles match	10:56
7	Junji Hirata (NJPW) & Ryuma Go (Go Gudan) defeated Team New Japan (Tadao Yasuda & Osamu Kido) when Hirata pinned Yasuda	Tag team match (NJPW/Go Gudan)	07:11
8	Hideaki Takizawa defeated Antonio Inoki by pinfall	Singles match	03:57
9	Team Big Japan (Ryuji Yamakawa & Tomoaki Honma) defeated Team FMW (Naoki Yamazaki & H) when Yamikawa pinned Yamazaki	Tag team match (Big Japan/FMW)	18:58
10	Yoji Anjoh defeated Tarzan Goto via disqualification in a "grudge" match	Singles match	13:37
11	Genichiro Tenryu (WAR) & BB Jones defeated Shinya Hashimoto & Naoya Ogawa when Jones pinned Hashimoto with a jumping elbow drop	Tag team match (WAR/NJPW/UFO)	08:51
