= Brodie Lee Celebration of Life =

2020 All Elite Wrestling television special and memorial event

- Promotional poster featuring Brodie Lee
- Promotion: All Elite Wrestling
- Date: December 30, 2020
- City: Jacksonville, Florida
- Venue: Daily's Place
- Attendance: 1,080
- Tagline: Brodie Lee Celebration of Life 1979–2020

AEW Dynamite special episodes chronology
← Previous; Holiday Bash	Next → New Year's Smash

The Brodie Lee Celebration of Life was a professional wrestling memorial event and television special produced by All Elite Wrestling (AEW). The event took place on December 30, 2020, at Daily's Place in Jacksonville, Florida and was broadcast on TNT as a special episode of Dynamite. It paid tribute to AEW wrestler Brodie Lee following his death four days prior.

== Production ==
=== Background ===
On December 26, 2020, Jonathan Huber died at the age of 41 of idiopathic pulmonary fibrosis (initially revealed as a "non-COVID lung issue") at the Mayo Clinic in Jacksonville, Florida. He had been hospitalized in the intensive care unit since late October 2020. Better known by his ring name "Mr. Brodie Lee", Huber debuted in All Elite Wrestling (AEW) as "The Exalted One" and the leader of The Dark Order on March 18, 2020. The March 18 episode of Dynamite was originally scheduled to take place at the Blue Cross Arena in Rochester, New York, Huber's hometown. It was in turn the first episode to be held behind closed doors at Daily's Place in Jacksonville due to the COVID-19 pandemic, which is where the majority of AEW's shows over the following year had to be held, although in August, AEW began holding shows with fans at 10–15% capacity of the venue.

On December 28, AEW President and Chief Executive Officer Tony Khan announced that the December 30 episode of Dynamite would be a memorial event, titled "Brodie Lee Celebration of Life". Four days before his death, Huber's oldest son, Brodie, appeared on the December 22 episode of Dark at ringside with a mask as "-1", a member of The Dark Order. It was later revealed that Brodie signed an AEW contract.

AEW had previously announced that the December 30, 2020, and January 6, 2021, episodes of Dynamite would host the two-part New Year's Smash event. However, it was postponed to January 6 and January 13 to allow AEW to hold Huber's memorial event.

=== Storylines ===
The Brodie Lee Celebration of Life featured professional wrestling matches and segments that paid tribute to Brodie Lee, with all of the matches featuring members of The Dark Order of which Lee was the leader (and all matches were won by the teams featuring The Dark Order). AEW intended for this event to be non-canonical, ignoring some ongoing storylines of the promotion. Some wrestlers were paired in tag teams with other wrestlers that they would not normally team with during the tribute event. AEW storylines, at the time, were typically produced on the weekly television program, Dynamite, the supplementary online streaming show, Dark, and The Young Bucks' YouTube series Being The Elite.

As the event was largely non-canonical, there were few storylines for the matches going into the event. However, one match in particular was billed as the "Brodie Lee Jr. Dream Match", featuring three of Lee's son's favorite AEW wrestlers, Cody Rhodes, Orange Cassidy, and The Dark Order's Preston "10" Vance teaming for one night only in a six-man tag team match against Team Taz (Brian Cage, Ricky Starks, and Powerhouse Hobbs).

== Event ==
Other on-screen personnel
Role	Name
Commentators	Jim Ross
Commentators	Excalibur
Commentators	Tony Schiavone
Commentators	Chris Jericho
Ring announcer	Justin Roberts
Referees	Aubrey Edwards
Referees	Bryce Remsburg
Referees	Paul Turner
Referees	Rick Knox

The Brodie Lee Celebration of Life opened with commentator Jim Ross saying one of Brodie Lee's catchphrases, "It's Wednesday and you know what that means", followed by a ten-bell salute with the entire AEW roster and Lee's family onstage honoring Lee. Throughout the show, there were segments with fellow AEW personnel Jon Moxley, Darby Allin, Dax Harwood, Arn Anderson, Colt Cabana, referee Bryce Remsburg, Eddie Kingston, Chris Jericho, Frankie Kazarian, Dustin Rhodes, Jerry Lynn, Christopher Daniels, Wardlow, and Matt Hardy sharing stories and their thoughts on Lee.

The AEW roster wore black armbands with "RIP Brodie Lee" and Brodie Lee t-shirts honoring Lee. Also honoring Lee, there were purple wristbands and bandanas worn, along with several women wearing purple makeup to represent the colors of The Dark Order, the stable he led. Lance Archer wore a white tank top and blue jeans, similar to ring gear that Lee wore at WWE with the "Luke Harper" character he portrayed prior to joining AEW. Eddie Kingston wore a vintage (pre-2012) Notre Dame football jersey because Lee used to tell people "he played offensive tackle at Notre Dame and blocked for Tony Rice in the '80s. Just to pop himself." Wrestlers paid tribute to Lee in their matches by pointing up and looking to the sky, using Lee's gestures, taunts, and signature moves like The Dark Order hand gesture, his Brodie Bossman slam, Brodie Powerbomb, Brodie Big Boot, and his finishing move the discus lariat.

To start their six-man tag team match, Adam Page, Alex Reynolds and John Silver used papers to hit their opponents, a tribute to Lee's Being The Elite segments. Later on in the match, as Wardlow went to attack John Silver, Lee's former long-time WWE tag team partner Erick Redbeard, formerly known as Erick Rowan, made his surprise AEW debut protecting Silver and then proceeding to attack Wardlow. MJF taunted Brodie Huber, who was sitting ringside with Dark Order's Alan "5" Angels throughout the match, and after MJF removed his Dark Order mask, Huber hit him in the head with a kendo stick. After the match, Redbeard came back to the ring, celebrating with the winning team, and held up a sign that read: "Goodbye for now, my brother. See you down the road."

The main event match featured Brodie Huber's favorites Cody Rhodes, Orange Cassidy, and The Dark Order's Preston "10" Vance teaming for one-night only against Team Taz (Brian Cage, Ricky Starks, and Powerhouse Hobbs) in what was billed as the "Brodie Lee Jr. Dream Match". In the end, Vance hit Starks with a spinebuster for the pinfall, giving the win to his team, and making it a clean sweep for The Dark Order. After the match, Team Taz attacked their opponents but retreated when Darby Allin and Sting made their way to the ring joining Rhodes, Cassidy, and Vance, ending in a staredown between them and Team Taz. This was one of a few small canonical things to happen during the event, as there was an ongoing storyline between Rhodes, Allin, Sting, and Team Taz.

Following a speech by Cody Rhodes, Jon's widow Amanda Huber and son Brodie came to the ring and left Jon's wrestling boots and a purple bandana in the middle of the ring. Then, Brodie Huber was awarded the TNT Championship belt by AEW President and CEO Tony Khan, naming him "TNT Champion for life" while retiring the red strap version of the championship belt as a tribute to Jon Huber. A new black strap version of the belt was commissioned by AEW. A tribute video with "Ol' '55" by Tom Waits closed the show. Khan purchased the rights to the song in perpetuity, saying "so the tribute will last forever".

== Reception ==
The Brodie Lee Celebration of Life was attended by 1,080 fans (very close to 20% of the venue's capacity of 5,500) which was a sellout, the second largest American pro wrestling crowd since the COVID-19 pandemic in the United States started, and AEW's largest since the start of the pandemic. The memorial show was met with universal acclaim from fans, critics, and fellow wrestlers. Dave Meltzer, publisher and editor of the Wrestling Observer Newsletter, described the show as "easily the best wrestling television show of the year." Mike Johnson of PWInsider called the show "the classiest, most perfect tribute show I've ever seen in all of my time watching professional wrestling".

During the show, Pro Wrestling Tees' Shop AEW store released a t-shirt in memory of Brodie Lee with all proceeds benefiting The Huber Family. In less than two hours, it set a new record for most shirts sold within 24 hours, breaking Sting's previous record. In just under four hours, it became the highest selling t-shirt of 2020, breaking Orange Cassidy's previous record.

=== Television ratings ===
The Brodie Lee Celebration of Life averaged 977,000 television viewers on TNT and a 0.40 rating in AEW's key demographic.

== Results ==
No.	Results	Stipulations	Times
1	Colt Cabana and The Young Bucks (Matt Jackson and Nick Jackson) defeated Matt Hardy and Private Party (Isiah Kassidy and Marq Quen)	Six-man tag team match	15:31
2	Lance Archer and The Dark Order (Evil Uno and Stu Grayson) (with Jake Roberts) defeated Eddie Kingston, The Butcher and the Blade (with The Bunny)	Six-man tag team match	9:40
3	"Hangman" Adam Page and The Dark Order (Alex "3" Reynolds and John "4" Silver) defeated The Inner Circle (MJF, Santana and Ortiz) (with Wardlow, Sammy Guevara, and Jake Hager)	Six-man tag team match	12:42
4	Anna "99" Jay and Tay Conti defeated Dr. Britt Baker, D.M.D. and Penelope Ford (with Rebel, Kip Sabian, and Miro) by submission	Tag team match	10:04
5	Cody Rhodes, Orange Cassidy, and Preston "10" Vance (with Arn Anderson and Alan "5" Angels) defeated Team Taz (Brian Cage, Ricky Starks, and Powerhouse Hobbs) (with Taz and Hook)	Six-man tag team match	11:35

== See also ==
- 2020 in professional wrestling
- List of professional wrestling memorial shows
