= The Jay Briscoe Celebration of Life =

2023 Ring of Honor memorial event

Jay Briscoe Celebration of Life
- Entrance set, featuring the logo for the Jay Briscoe Celebration of Life tribute show
- Promotion: Ring of Honor
- Date: January 18, 2023 (aired January 26, 2023)
- City: Fresno, California
- Venue: Save Mart Center

The Jay Briscoe Celebration of Life, also known as the Jay Briscoe Tribute and Celebration of Life, was a professional wrestling memorial event and television special produced by Ring of Honor (ROH). The event took place on January 18, 2023, at the Save Mart Center in Fresno, California and was broadcast on Honor Club. It paid tribute to ROH wrestler Jay Briscoe (who was part of the tag team The Briscoes, alongside his brother Mark Briscoe) following his death the day prior. The show was taped after AEW Dynamite and AEW Rampage on January 18 and aired on January 26.

== Background ==
Jay Briscoe died in a car accident in Laurel, Delaware on January 17, 2023, at the age of 38 while taking his two daughters to cheerleading practice. His death was announced on Twitter by Ring of Honor (ROH) owner Tony Khan. His funeral was held on January 29, 2023, at Laurel High School, with eulogies being delivered by his parents, brother, and fellow wrestler Caprice Coleman.

On January 18, an episode of ROH Honor Club TV was filmed as a Jay Briscoe tribute show, titled Jay Briscoe Tribute and Celebration of Life. The next day, on Wrestling Observer Radio, journalist Dave Meltzer revealed that plans were made to hold another tribute show for Briscoe when ROH resumed airing its weekly series later in the year. On the January 20 episode of SmackDown, WWE commentator Michael Cole paid tribute to Briscoe, labeling him and brother Mark as "one of the greatest tag teams in wrestling". Briscoe's brother, Mark, defeated Jay Lethal in the main event match of the January 25 episode of AEW Dynamite, on what would have been Jay's 39th birthday. The entire locker room came out after the match to celebrate Mark's win.

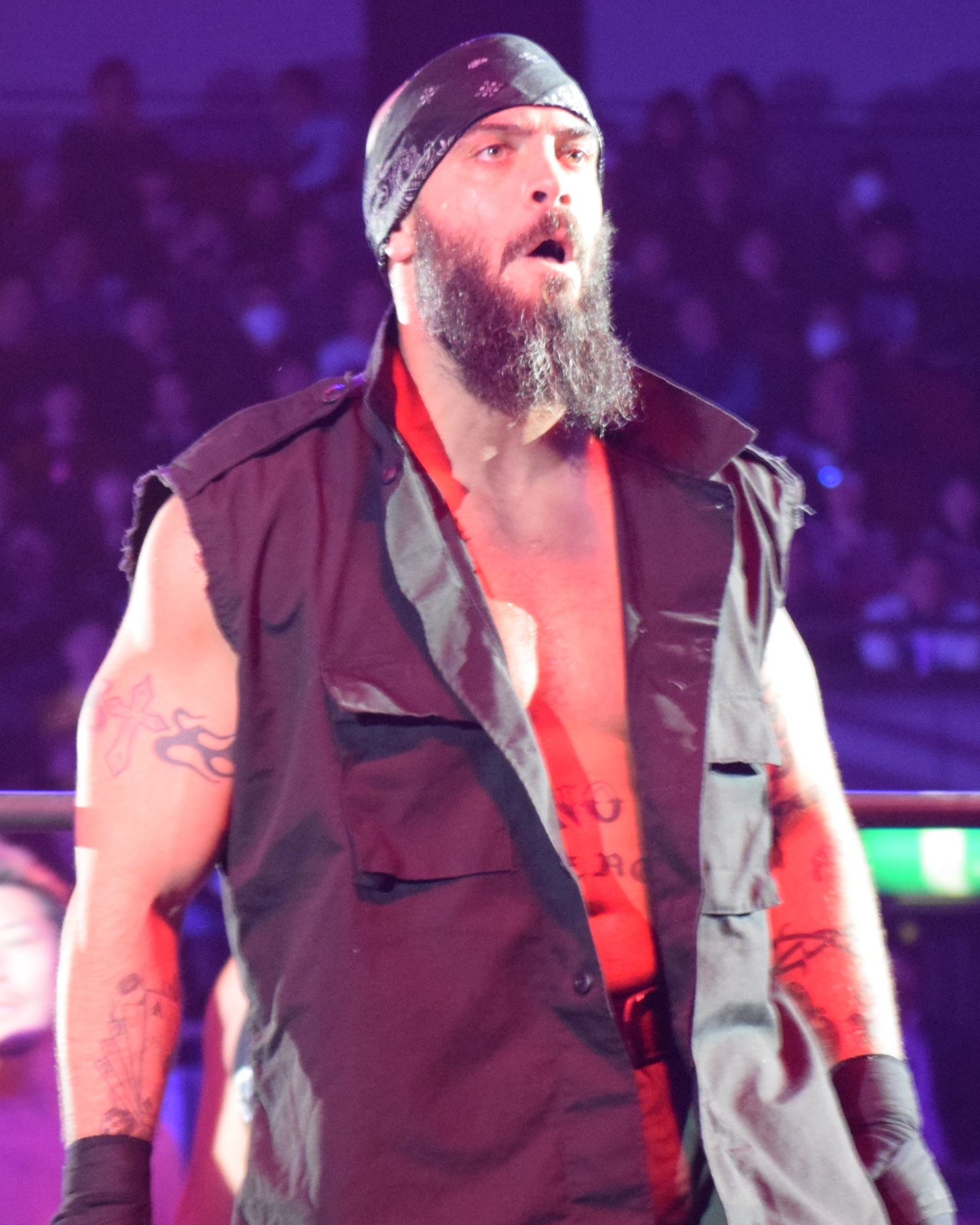
Jay Briscoe

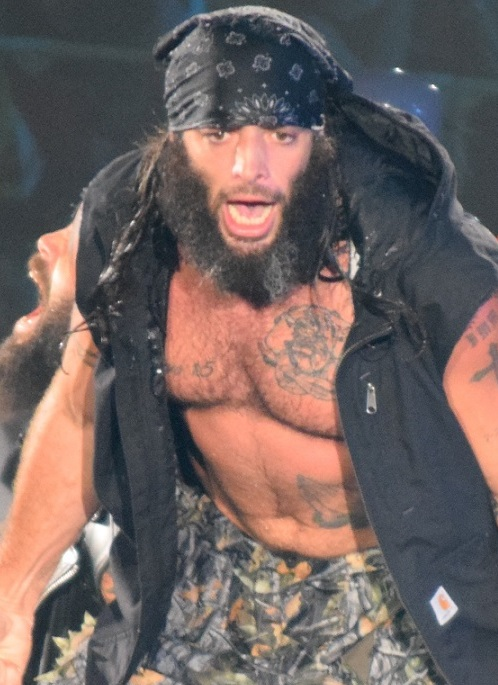
Jay's brother Mark Briscoe.

=== Storylines ===
The Jay Briscoe Celebration of Life featured professional wrestling matches and segments that paid tribute to Jay Briscoe. ROH intended for this event to be non-canonical, ignoring some ongoing storylines of the promotions.

As the event was largely non-canonical, there were few storylines for the matches going into the event. The main event saw Claudio Castagnoli defend his ROH World Championship against ROH veteran Christopher Daniels.

== Event ==
Other on-screen personnel
Role	Name
Commentators	Ian Riccaboni
Commentators	Caprice Coleman
Ring announcer	Justin Roberts
Referees	Aubrey Edwards
Referees	Rick Knox
Referees	Paul Turner
Referees	Stephon Smith
Referees	Mike Posey

The Jay Briscoe Celebration of Life opened with ROH commentators Ian Riccaboni and Caprice Coleman talking about Jay as a father and a performer. ROH owner Tony Khan came out and thanked everyone for coming to honor the life of Jay. There were various vignettes aired backstage about various AEW wrestlers talking about their relationship with Jay Briscoe, featuring Samoa Joe, Adam Cole, Christopher Daniels, Prince Nana, Austin Gunn, Matt Hardy, Eddie Kingston, BJ Whitmer, Stokely Hathaway, Zane Decker and Claudio Castagnoli. Segments also aired featuring three of Jay Briscoe's biggest matches.

The event started with Wheeler Yuta defending the ROH Pure Championship in a Pure Wrestling Rules match against Hagane Shinno. In the closing stages, Yuta performed a lariat and diving splash, but Shinno kicked out. Yuta then performed hammer and anvil elbow strikes and a modified seated fujiwara armbar for the submission victory.

Next, there was a segment about the rivalry between Jay Briscoe and Adam Cole, which culminated at Final Battle 2010 in which Jay defended the ROH World Championship against Cole. Jay performed two Jay Drillers (including one on the title) for the win.

Next on the show, Adam Cole came out and talked about his relationship with The Briscoes. He ended by saying "Jay, I love you, I miss you and you made the world a better place".

The next match on the main card was between Marina Shafir and Mighty Mayra. In the end, Shafir hit a big boot and a hammerlock torque on the hand for the submission win.

There was another segment featuring Jay Briscoe taking on Christopher Daniels (with Frankie Kazarian) on Night 2 of Survival of the Fittest 2016. As Daniels was partially conscious, Jay hit a Jay Driller for the win.

The next match was between Eddie Kingston and QT Marshall. In the closing stages, as Kingston was looking for a back suplex, Marshall blocked it. Marshall started taunting the crowd, and as he was looking for the Diamond Cutter. Kingston escaped and hit a spinning backfist and a dragon sleeper for the win. After the match, Kingston unveiled a poster with the caption "Reach For The Sky Boy, Jay Briscoe Forever".

Next, Athena faced Madison Rayne (with Skye Blue). Athena performed a gutbuster and a crossface for the victory. After the match, as Blue was distracted, Athena sneaked back into the ring and hit her with the ROH Women's World Championship belt.

The next match was Juice Robinson taking on Brandon Cutler. As Cutler was going to the top rope, Robinson pushed the rope, allowing him to perform a cannonball in the corner and a headlock driver for the pin and the win.

In the penultimate match, Yuka Sakazaki faced Sandra Moone. Sakazaki performed an airplane spin facebuster and a springboard twisting splash for the win.

The final Jay Briscoe segment featured he and his brother Mark teaming up as The Briscoes to take on The Kings of Wrestling (Chris Hero and Claudio Castagnoli) (with Larry Sweeney) at Final Battle 2006 in Castagnoli's final ROH match. In the closing stages, as Sweeney was distracting the referee, Castagnoli unintentionally hit Hero with a briefcase, allowing the Briscoes to hit their shooting star press/leg drop combination for the win.

=== Main event ===
In the main event, Claudio Castagnoli defended the ROH World Championship against Christopher Daniels. The referee was Paul Turner, who had overseen more Jay Briscoes matches then any other referee. Castagnoli started with a side headlock takedown. Daniels performed his own side headlock, which Claudio escaped into a shoulder tackle. As Daniels was looking for some kind of maneuver, Castagnoli countered it into a gutbuster, which sent Daniels out of the ring. As Daniels entered the ring, he immediately performed a clothesline. Daniels started overpowering Castagnoli, hitting a flatliner into a Koji clutch, but Castagnoli escaped. Daniels then locked in guillotine choke, but Castagnoli countered it into a suplex. Castagnoli started hitting multiple uppercuts in the corner. As Castagnoli was looking for the Giant Swing, Daniels blocked it with a chop to the throat and performed a schoolboy pin, but Castagnoli kicked out. In the closing stages, Daniels performed The Best Moonsault Ever, but Castagnoli again kicked out. As Daniels was looking for Angels' Wing, Castagnoli escaped it and hit the Very European Uppercut, which led to the Giant Swing (where he swung Daniels for 10 revolutions) and Jay Driller for the win. After the match, Castagnoli and Daniels embraced each other as Jay Briscoe's music hit and the show came to and end.

== Results ==
No.	Results	Stipulations	Times
1	Wheeler Yuta (c) defeated Hagane Shinno by pinfall	Pure Wrestling Rules match for the ROH Pure Championship; Dean Malenko, BJ Whitmer and Jerry Lynn served as the judges	9:32
2	Marina Shafir defeated Mighty Mayra by submission	Singles match	2:10
3	Eddie Kingston defeated QT Marshall by pinfall	Singles match	5:08
4	Athena defeated Madison Rayne (with Skye Blue) by submission	ROH Women's World Championship Eliminator match Had Rayne won, she would have had a match with Athena for the ROH Women's World Championship	8:25
5	Juice Robinson defeated Brandon Cutler by pinfall	Singles match	7:40
6	Yuka Sakazaki defeated Sandra Moone by pinfall	Singles match	3:01
7	Claudio Castagnoli (c) defeated Christopher Daniels by pinfall	Singles match for the ROH World Championship	13:35
(c) / – the champion(s) heading into the match

== See also ==
- 2023 in professional wrestling
- List of professional wrestling memorial shows
- Hana Kimura Memorial Show
- Daffney
