= Ikki Kajiwara Memorial Show =

Professional wrestling event in Japan

The Ikki Kajiwara Memorial Show was a Japanese professional wrestling event held in 1988, and again in 1997, in memory of author and manga writer Ikki Kajiwara. Although Kajiwara was not directly connected to puroresu wrestling, he is credited with having created the Tiger Mask character, which has been a popular masked wrestler portrayed by four different Japanese wrestlers in All-Japan Pro Wrestling and New Japan Pro-Wrestling since the early 1980s.

The original show was held at Budokan Hall in Tokyo, Japan, on April 2, 1988, and featured wrestlers from All-Japan Pro Wrestling, New Japan Pro-Wrestling and the joshi wrestling promotion Japan Women's Pro Wrestling as well as boxing, judo, karate and shoot fighting exhibition matches. The main event featured Tiger Mask II and Giant Baba defeating Abdullah the Butcher and George Skaaland in a tag team match. On the undercard, Masa Fuchi successfully defended the PWF Junior Heavyweight Championship against Kenta Kobashi.

A second show was held nine years later and held at Tokyo's Sumo Hall on October 12, 1997, attended by 4,000 fans. Like the 1988 show, this was also held as an interpromotional event and had involvement from several major wrestling promotion in Japan at the time. These included, aside from AJPW and NJPW, Kitao Dojo, Ladies Legend Pro-Wrestling, Michinoku Pro, Professional Wrestling Fujiwara Gumi and Wrestle Association R. In the semi-main events, Team WAR (Genichiro Tenryu & Arashi) defeated Team Kitao Dojo (Koji Kitao & Maasaki Mochizuki) while PWFG's Yoshiaki Fujiwara and Super Tiger, NJPW's original Tiger Mask, fought to a no-contest with Antonio Inoki as the special guest referee. On the undercard, Tiger Mask I & Tiger Mask IV faced Tiger Mask II & Tiger Mask III in a tag team match which ended when Tiger Mask I pinned Tiger Mask III. Mitsuharu Misawa, the actual wrestler who portrayed Tiger Mask II, was unable to attend the event and Yoshinobu Kanemaru wrestled in his place. The match was officiated by Michinoku Pro's The Great Sasuke as a special guest referee.

== Show results ==
=== 1997 Ikki Kajiwara Memorial Show ===
October 12, 1997, in Tokyo, Japan (Sumo Hall)

No.	Results	Stipulations	Times
1	Yasha Kurenai & Carol Midori defeated Eagle Sawai & Michiko Nagashima	Tag team match (LLPW)	—
2	Kamikaze vs. Noguchi ended in a time-limit draw	Singles match	—
3	Kenichi Sato defeated Kyoko Gooseriver	Singles match	—
4	Tiger Mask I & Tiger Mask IV defeated Tiger Mask II & Tiger Mask III when Tiger I pinned Tiger III.	Tag team match (AJPW/NWPW/Michinoku Pro) The Great Sasuke special guest referee.	12:08
5	Team WAR (Genichiro Tenryu & Arashi) defeated Team Kitao Dojo (Koji Kitao & Maasaki Mochizuki)	Tag team match (Kitao Dojo/WAR)	—
6	Yoshiaki Fujiwara vs. Super Tiger (Tiger Mask I) ended in a no-contest	Singles match. Antonio Inoki special guest referee.	—

=== 1988 Ikki Kajiwara Memorial Show ===
April 2, 1988, in Tokyo, Japan (Budokan Hall)

No.	Results	Stipulations
1	Harley Saito defeated Miss A	Singles match (JWP)
2	Rumi Kazama defeated Cutie Suzuki	Singles match (JWP)
3	Yoshiaki Fujiwara vs. Ismael Changani ended in a time-limit draw	"wrestler vs. kickboxer" match (NJPW)
4	Masa Fuchi (c) defeated Kenta Kobashi	Singles match for the PWF World Junior Heavyweight Championship
5	Giant Baba & Tiger Mask II defeated Abdullah the Butcher & George Skaaland	Tag team match (AJPW)
(c) / – the champion(s) heading into the match
