= Tony Khan =

American businessman (born 1982)

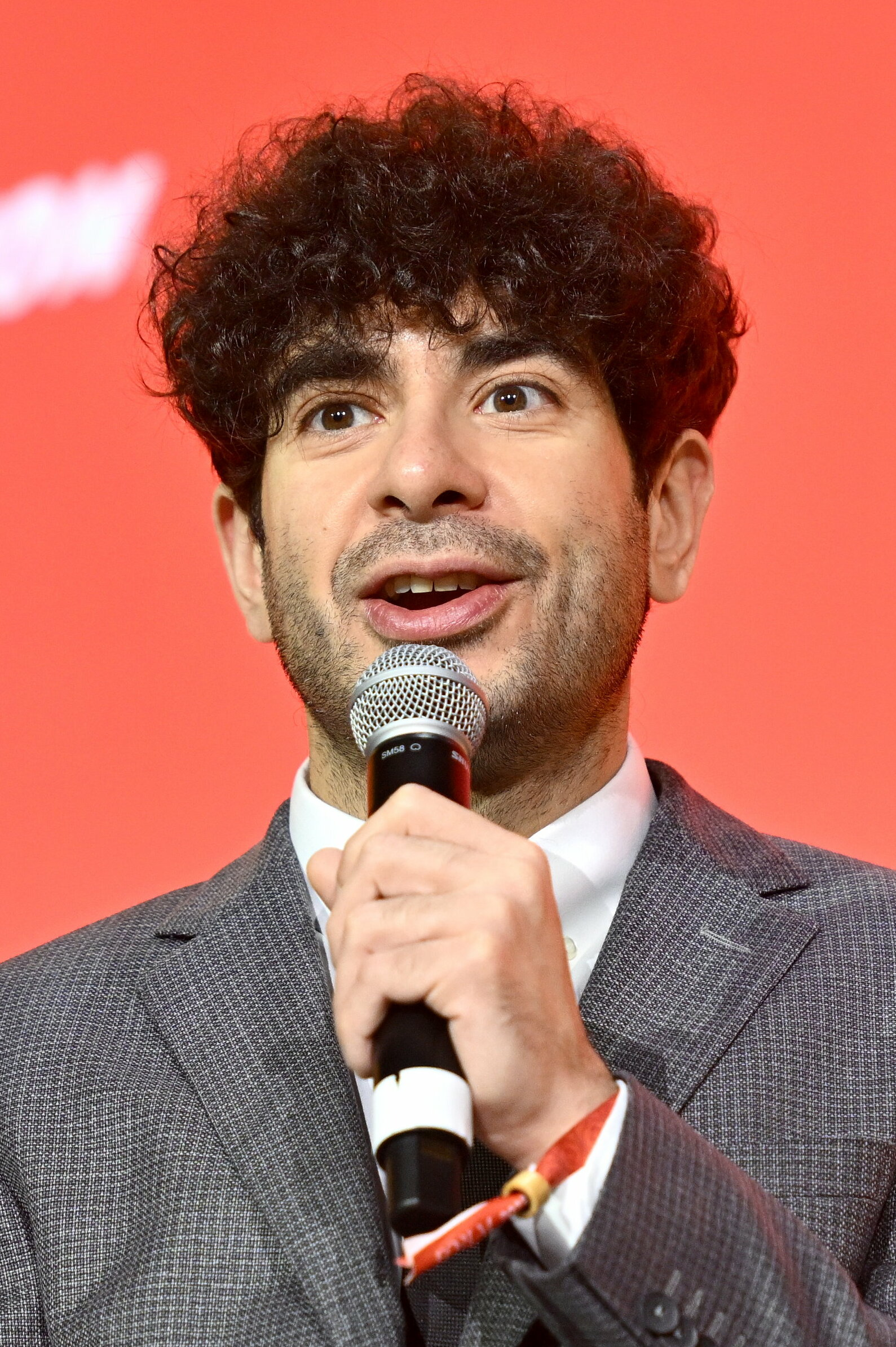
- Khan in 2023
- Born: Antony Rafiq Khan; October 10, 1982 (age 44); Champaign–Urbana, Illinois, U.S.
- Occupations: Businessman; sports executive; professional wrestling promoter
- Years active: 2012–present
- Relatives: Shahid Khan (father)

Antony Rafiq Khan (Note: Urdu: انٹونی رفیق خان) (Note: No relation to WWE's Nick Khan, despite being top wrestling executives and having the same last name) (born October 10, 1982) is an American businessman, sports executive, and professional wrestling promoter. He is best known as the founder, owner, president, chief executive officer, executive producer, and head booker of All Elite Wrestling (AEW). He is also the owner of Ring of Honor (ROH), which he purchased and turned into AEW's sister promotion.

Khan is the son of Pakistani and American businessman Shahid Khan, the owner of the NFL's Jacksonville Jaguars and English Premier League team Fulham FC. He holds executive roles at both organizations, being chief football strategy officer with the Jaguars and vice-chairman and director of football operations with Fulham. His other business ventures include TruMedia Networks and Activist Artists Management.

== Early life ==
Antony Rafiq Khan was born in Champaign-Urbana, Illinois, on October 10, 1982, the son of a Pakistani businessman father Shahid Khan and American mother Ann Carlson. He has a sister named Shanna. His father became a billionaire in the automotive industry through his ownership of Flex-N-Gate, which supplied car bumpers.

According to Khan, he has been a member of the Internet Wrestling Community (IWC) since 12 via AOL. He graduated from the University Laboratory High School in 2001 and University of Illinois Urbana-Champaign in 2007 with a Bachelor of Science degree in finance. Khan is a Christian.

== Business ventures ==
=== American football and soccer ===
==== Jacksonville Jaguars ====
Khan joined the Jacksonville Jaguars in July 2012, following his father's purchase of the team, and currently serves as Senior President of Football and Analytics. Khan's most prominent role within the Jaguars is scouting undrafted free agents; a short 2024 NFL Films feature followed Khan handling both his scouting responsibilities during that year's NFL draft and his responsibilities overseeing a live broadcast of All Elite Wrestling's Collision, over the span of 24 hours.

In April 2020, Jaguars defensive end Yannick Ngakoue referred to Khan as "spoiled", after a confrontation on Twitter. In August 2020, Ngakoue was traded to the Minnesota Vikings.

==== Fulham ====
On February 22, 2017, Khan was named as vice-chairman and director of football operations of Fulham. He oversees the identification, evaluation, recruitment, general maintenance and signing of players for Fulham. Khan assumed these responsibilities following a period of advising the football operations at the club, particularly in the areas of analytics and research. Although Khan was not able to have an immediate effect (as it was after the January transfer window), Fulham only lost twice and went on a run that saw them finish the season in sixth place, where they were defeated in the play-off semi-final to Reading.

Khan's first full season as vice-chairman, saw the breakout of youth product Ryan Sessegnon as well as the mid-season loan signing of Aleksandar Mitrović amongst the goals, as Fulham earned promotion to the Premier League by defeating Aston Villa in the play-off final, of which he was present. In the 2018–19 season, Fulham brought in a number of expensive signings, headlined by the permanent signing of Mitrović from Newcastle United and Jean Michaël Seri from Nice. By January 2019, Fulham were stuck in the relegation zone, despite having sacked Slaviša Jokanović and replacing him with Claudio Ranieri. Around this time, Khan was criticised for telling a supporter of the club to "go to hell", although he claimed that this person had previously hounded him before. After Ranieri's departure, BBC Radio 5 Live pundits Ian Wright and Chris Sutton questioned Khan's capability in the job, with Wright even suggesting that Shahid Khan should sack his son. Fulham ended the season in 19th place, resulting in the second relegation under Shahid Khan's ownership.

In the 2019–20 season, caretaker manager Scott Parker was named manager on a permanent basis, with the summer transfers consisting mostly of loan signings. Fulham would end the season – which was interrupted by the COVID-19 pandemic – in 4th place, once again earning promotion to the Premier League by defeating Brentford in the play-off final. Unable to appear at the final, Khan made a FaceTime call to congratulate Fulham's players. In the 2020–21 season, Fulham brought in a mix of loan and permanent signings, including Terence Kongolo and Harrison Reed who played for the club on loan the previous season. In September 2020, Khan was called a "clown" by Sky Sports pundit Jamie Carragher for tweeting critical comments of Fulham players, and described the transfer history of Khan as "a right mess". Khan's comments angered Parker, who described the situation as "the world we live in". Fulham ended the season in 18th place, resulting in another relegation. In the 2021–22 season, Marco Silva succeeded Parker as manager, leading to Fulham topping the Championship. Mitrović scored 43 goals, easily breaking the record set by Ivan Toney (in 2020–21), as well as the record set by Guy Whittingham for the most scored in a 46-game season. In an interview with The Athletic, Khan stated that he had convinced Mitrović to stay, despite interest from Dynamo Moscow and following a season in which he only scored three goals. He was also optimistic that this would be the season that Fulham would no longer be perceived as a "yo-yo club".

=== Professional wrestling ===
==== All Elite Wrestling ====
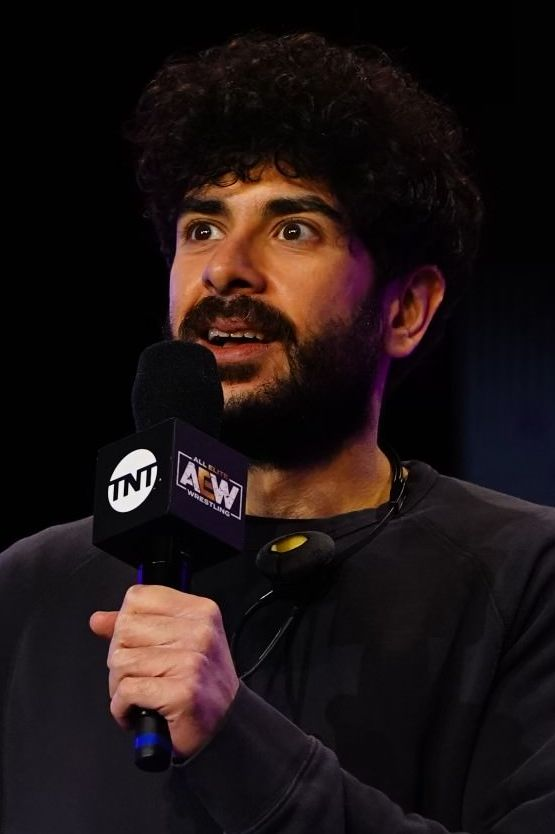
Khan speaking at an AEW event in December 2021

In January 2019, Khan officially launched professional wrestling promotion All Elite Wrestling (AEW) after filing several trademarks in late 2018. A lifelong wrestling fan, Khan founded the company with financial backing from his father Shahid Khan and serves as its owner, president, CEO, executive producer, and head booker. AEW's first event Double or Nothing was held at the MGM Grand Garden Arena in Las Vegas on May 25, 2019.

Khan has described his management style as highly involved; he writes shows and storylines and approves all televised segments. While AEW talent are generally given much creative freedom in scripting their own promos, Khan retains final authority over creative decisions. While typically not a character on-screen, he occasionally appears in AEW programming to make announcements. In late April 2024, he appeared in a rare storyline segment on Dynamite, during which he was attacked by members of the villainous faction The Elite.

==== Ring of Honor ====
On March 2, 2022, Khan announced that he had acquired the professional wrestling promotion Ring of Honor (ROH) from Sinclair Broadcast Group. The acquisition included ROH's video library, brand assets, and intellectual property. The purchase was made through a separate corporate entity wholly owned by Khan, distinct from AEW. He has since operated ROH as a standalone sister promotion to AEW, while indicating its potential use as a developmental platform for AEW talent.

==== Reception ====
Khan's leadership of AEW has received both praise and criticism. The Wrestling Observer Newsletter named him Promoter of the Year in 2019, 2020, 2021, and 2022, as well as Best Booker in 2020, 2021, and 2022. AEW personnel including Chris Jericho, Jim Ross, and Jon Moxley have publicly supported his approach.

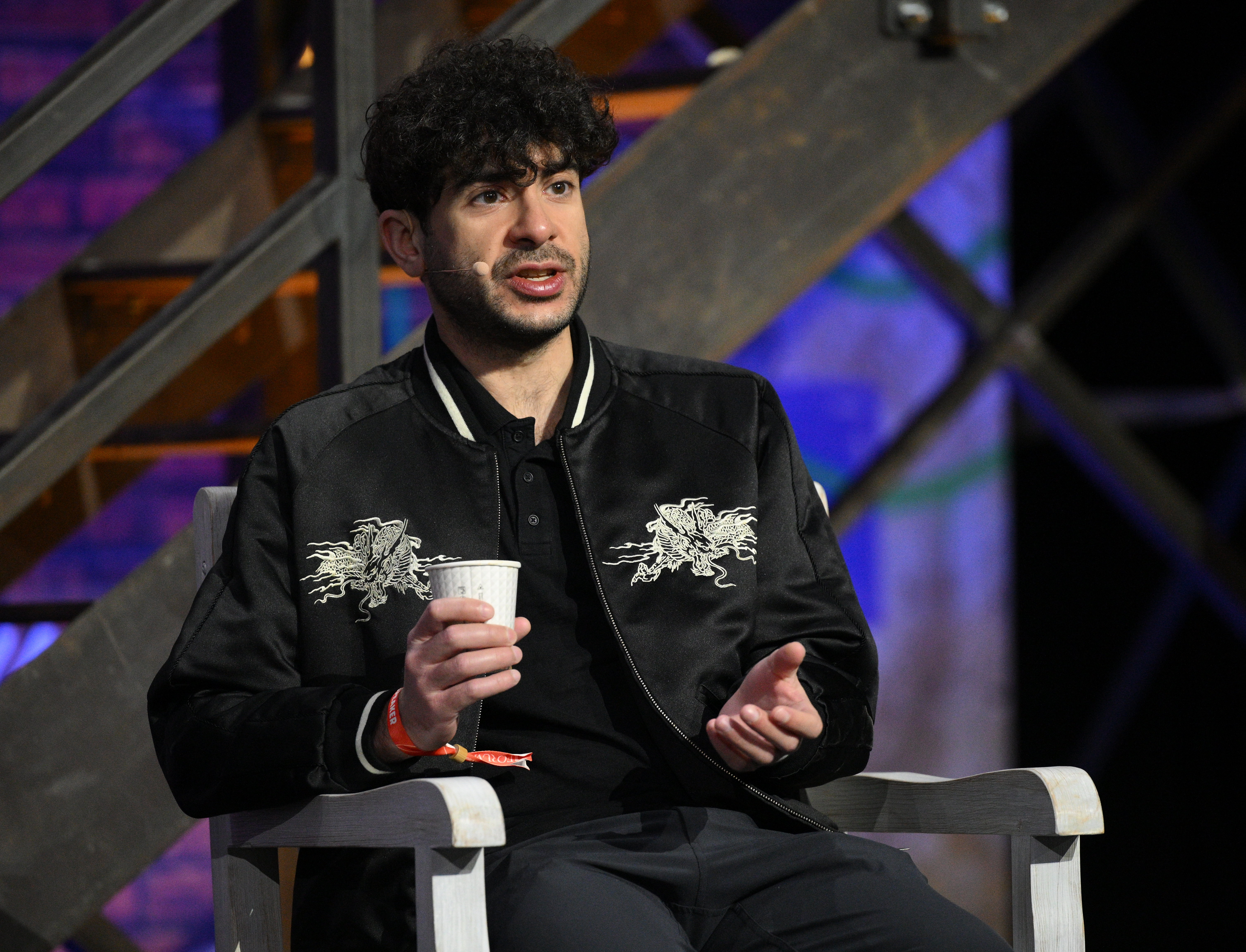
Khan speaking at the Panda Conference in 2022

Khan has also faced criticism. In December 2021, after former AEW wrestler Big Swole claimed that she left AEW because she was unimpressed by its lack of diversity and structure, Khan controversially responded that her contract had not been renewed because he "felt her wrestling wasn't good enough". Industry figures such as Eric Bischoff and Dave Scherer have also criticized his management style, with some questioning his handling of backstage issues and talent discipline. His decision to terminate CM Punk's contract in 2023 following a backstage altercation drew a divided response from fans and media outlets alike.

=== Other business ventures ===
Khan is the owner and chairman of TruMedia Networks, a Boston-based engineering firm specializing in analytics for the athletic sports industry. Khan acquired TruMedia Networks in 2015, and under his ownership, the company has expanded its sports analytics engineering services, with clients including ESPN, the National Football League, Zebra Technologies, and over 60 percent of all Major League Baseball clubs.

Along with TruMedia Networks, Khan and his family helped fund Activist Artists Management, a talent management and advisory firm founded in 2018. Khan made a significant investment in the firm, and separately established the Activist content and venture fund focused on investments in media, entertainment, hospitality as well as consumer products, services, and technologies.

== Filmography ==
Year	Title	Role
2021	Rhodes to the Top	Himself; Executive producer
2023	AEW All Access	Himself; Executive producer

== Awards and accomplishments ==
- Wrestling Observer Newsletter
  - Promoter of the Year (2019–2022)
  - Best Booker (2020–2022; 2025)
