= List of former Smoky Mountain Wrestling personnel =

Smoky Mountain Wrestling was a professional wrestling promotion based in Knoxville, Tennessee from 1991 to 1995. Former employees in SMW consisted of professional wrestlers, managers, play-by-play and color commentators, announcers, interviewers and referees.

== Alumni ==
=== Male wrestlers ===
Birth name:	Ring name(s):	Tenure:	Notes
Jason Ahrndt	Jason Ahrndt	1995	
Terry Alexander	Mr. USA	1994	
Brad Anderson	Brad Anderson	1991	
Roger Anderson^{†}	Roger Anderson	1993	
Darrell Anthony	Dirty White Boy / The Mighty Yankee	1991–1995	
Scott Antol	Scott Studd	1994	
Christopher Ashford-Smith^{†}	Kowabunga	1993	
Richard Aslinger	Richard Slinger	1994	
Roger Barnes	Ronnie Garvin	1992, 1994	
Tom Barrett	Tommy Angel	1991–1992	
Bart Batten	Bart Batten	1992–1995	
Brad Batten ^{†}	Brad Batten	1992–1995	
Larry Booker †	Moondog Spot	1993–1994	
Tom Brandi	Johnny Gunn	1994	
Carl Brantley	Vladimir Koloff	1991–1992	
Daniel Briley	Danny Davis / The Galaxian	1992	
Jason Broyles	Steve Skyfire	1994	
Barry Buchanan	The Punisher	1995	
Ruben Cain	Robert Gibson	1991–1995	
Mark Calaway	The Undertaker	1995 ^{WWF}	
Chris Candido †	Chris Candido / The Avenger	1993–1995	
Sean Casey	Sean Casey	1994	
Joe Cazana	Joe Cazana	1991–1994	
Bryan Clark	The Nightstalker	1992–1993	
Accie Connor	A.C. Conner / D'Lo Brown	1994–1995	
Thomas Couch †	Tommy Rogers	1992	
Ion Croitoru †	Bruiser Bedlam	1994	
Jamie Cruikshanks	J. C. Ice	1995 ^{USWA}	
William DeMott	Crash the Terminator	1993	
Steve Doll †	Steven Dunn	1994	
Daniel Dubiel	Dan Dubiel	1994	
Bobby Eaton †	Bobby Eaton	1993	
Steve Eisenhower	Butch Cassidy	1995	
William Ensor †	Buddy Landel	1992, 1994–1995	
Lance Evers	Lance Storm	1994	
Jeff Farmer	The Black Scorpion	1991	
David Ferrier †	Jimmy Del Ray	1993–1995	
Mick Foley	Cactus Jack	1994	
Christopher Ford	Devon Storm	1994	
Jeff Frushia	Jeff Daniels	1992–1993	
Tim Frye	Tim Frye	1991	
Dory Funk Jr.	Dory Funk Jr.	1994	
Terry Funk †	Terry Funk	1993–1995	
Doug Furnas †	Doug Furnas	1992–1994	
Danny Gimondo	The Inferno Kid	1994	
Eddie Gilbert †	Eddie Gilbert	1994–1995	
Jimmy Golden	Jimmy Golden	1991–1993	
Terry Gordy †	Terry Gordy	1992, 1994–1995	
Archie Gouldie †	The Mongolian Stomper	1992–1995	
Steve Gower †	The Flame	1994	
Terry Gower	The Jailhouse Rocker	1994	
Chris Hamrick	Chris Hamrick	1994	
Jeff Hardy	Jeff Hardy	1995	
Matt Hardy	Matt Hardy	1995	
Neal Hargrove	Reno Riggins	1992–1993	
Rex Hargrove	Rex Hargrove	1992–1993	
Billy Harris	Hillbilly Festus	1994	
Brian Lee Harris	Brian Lee	1991–1995	
Don Harris	Don Bruise / Don Harris	1993–1994	
Karl Harris	Bobo Brazil Jr.	1995	
Ron Harris	Ron Bruise / Ron Harris	1993–1994	
Owen Hart †	Owen Hart	1994	
David Haskins	Davey Rich	1992	
William Haynes, Jr.	Billy Jack Haynes	1995	
Michael Hegstrand †	Road Warrior Hawk	1994	
Michael Hickenbottom	Shawn Michaels	1995 ^{WWF}	
Brian Hildebrand †	Kowabunga	1992, 1994–1995	
George Hines	Jackie Fulton	1991–1993, 1995	
James Hines	Bobby Fulton	1991–1993, 1995	
Tim Horner	Tim Horner / Kendo the Samurai	1991–1994	
Barry Horowitz	Barry Horowitz	1991–1992	
Robert Howard	Bob Holly	1991–1992	
Michael Imburgia	The Tower of Doom	1994	
Christopher Irvine	Chris Jericho	1994	
Hiroshi Itakura	Hiroshi Itakura	1993	
Glenn Jacobs	Unabomb	1995	
Bradley James †	Brad Armstrong	1995	
Brian James	Brian Armstrong / The Dark Secret	1992–1995	
Joseph Melton James †	Bob Armstrong / The Bullet	1992–1995	
Joseph Scott James	Scott Armstrong / Dixie Dynamite	1991–1995	
Steve James	Steve Armstrong	1993–1995	
Jimmy Jannetty	Jimmy Jannetty	1993	
Marty Jannetty	Marty Jannetty	1995	
Joel Jones	Joel Deaton	1992	
Yukihiro Kanemura	Yukihiro Kanemura	1993	
Lanny Kean †	Moondog Rex	1993–1994	
Brian Kees	Brian Logan / Gabriel Brimstone / The Hornet	1993–1995	
Robert Kellum	Robbie Eagle	1992–1994	
Wayne Keown	Dutch Mantell	1991–1993	
Christopher Kindred	Flash Flanagan	1995	
Christopher Klucsaritis ^{†}	Chris Canyon	1993	
Mark Kyle	Killer Kyle	1991–1995	
Terrance Ladd	Mustafa Saed	1994–1995	
Stan Lane	Stan Lane	1992–1993	
Jerry Lawler	Jerry Lawler	1994–1995	
Scott Levy	Scotty Flamingo	1994	
Ted Lipscomb †	The Nightmare / Ted Allen / Power Ranger	1993–1995	
Héctor Llanes	Héctor Guerrero	1991–1992	
Martin Lunde	Arn Anderson	1993 ^{WCW}	
Jerry Lynn	Jerry Lynn	1992	
Joseph Magliano †	Joey Maggs	1991–1992	
Mike Maraldo	Mike Maraldo / Doink the Clown	1994	
Rob Mayze	Prince Kharis / Malachi the Grim Reaper	1992–1994	
Anthony Michaels	Anthony Michaels / Fire the Inferno	1993–1995	
Peter Miller	The Mongolian Mauler	1992	
Mike Morgan	Rip Morgan	1992	
Ricky Morton	Ricky Morton	1992–1995	
Louis Mucciolo, Jr. †	Louie Spicolli	1994	
Hoyt Murdoch †	Dick Murdoch	1993–1994	
Ricky Nelson	Rikki Nelson	1991–1992	
Osamu Nishimura	Osamu Nishimura	1994	
Paul Orndorff †	Paul Orndorff	1991–1993 ^{WCW}	
Bob Orton Jr.	Bob Orton Jr.	1994	
Lou Perez	Lou Perez	1994	
Miguel Pérez Jr. ^{†}	Miguel Pérez Jr.	1993	
Oreal Perras †	Ivan Koloff	1991–1992	
Gene Petit †	Cousin Luke	1994	
Larry Pfohl	Lex Luger	1994 ^{WWF}	
Bill Pierce	Chris Comet / Chris Michaels	1992–1993, 1995	
Randy Poffo †	Randy Savage	1994 ^{WWF}	
Chris Powers	Stormtrooper	1992	
Tom Prichard	Tom Prichard	1992–1995	
Jonathan Rechner †	Boo Bradley / Abuddah Singh	1994–1995	
Robert Rechsteiner	Rick Steiner	1993	
Scott Rechsteiner	Scott Steiner	1993	
John Richardson	Johnny Rich	1992	
Thomas Richardson	Tommy Rich	1995	
Ken Rinehurst	Jack Victory	1992	
Brian Rogowski	Bryant Anderson	1994–1995	
Pat Rose	Pat Rose	1991–1992, 1994	
Mike Rotunda	Irwin R. Schyster	1994	
Glenn Ruth	Headbanger Thrasher	1995 ^{WWF}	
Michael Samples	Mike Samples	1995	
Allen Sarven	Al Snow / Shinobi	1994–1995	
Mark Sciarra	Rip Rogers	1991–1993	
Peter Senerchia	The Tasmaniac	1993	
Dan Severn	Dan Severn	1995	
Chad Slivenski	Chad Austin	1994	
Robert Smedley	Bobby Blaze / The Underdog	1993–1995	
Aurelian Smith Jr.	Jake Roberts	1994	
Timothy Smith †	Timothy Well	1994	
Tracy Smothers †	Tracy Smothers	1992–1995	
George South	George South / The Executioner	1994–1995	
Kevin Sullivan ^{†}	Kevin Sullivan / The Master	1992–1994 ^{WCW}	
Curtis Thompson	Curtis Thompson	1993–1995	
Raymond Traylor †	Big Boss Man	1993	
Gary Valiant	Gary Scott	1992–1993	
Richard Van Slater †	Dick Slater	1994	
Sean Waltman	The 1-2-3 Kid	1994 ^{WWF}	
Charles Warrington	Headbanger Mosh	1995 ^{WWF}	
George Weingeroff	Abdul Hassan	1993	
Robert Welch	Robert Fuller	1992–1993	
Billy White Jr.	Billy Black	1992, 1995	
White, Robert	Moondog Splat	1993	
Kelly Wolfe	Wolfie D	1995 ^{USWA}	
Steve Womack	Larry Santo / The Black Ninja	1993–1995	
Jerome Young †	New Jack	1994–1995	
Unknown	Ben Jordan	1992	
Unknown	Bill Maddox	1993	
Gregory Craig	Bo Alexander	1994	
Unknown	Brian Taylor	1994	
Unknown	The Buddha / The Mighty Buddha	1994–1995	
Unknown	Carl Stiles	1992	
Unknown	The Carolina Kid	1995	
Unknown	Chris Walker	1994	
Unknown	Colin West	1992	
Unknown	Daniel Little Bear	1992	
Unknown	The Demon	1992	
Unknown	Derek Domino	1994	
Unknown	Doug Dalton	1994	
Unknown	Gator McAllister	1993	
Unknown	Greg Maddox	1993	
Unknown	James Adkins	1994	
Unknown	James Alls	1994	
Unknown	Jason Herd	1994	
Unknown	Jason West	1993–1994	
Unknown	Jeff Victory	1994	
Unknown	John Hitchcock	1993	
Unknown	Johnny Del Rio	1993	
Unknown	Johnny Kidd	1993	
Unknown	Juicy Johnny	1993	
Unknown	Kenny Arden	1995	
Unknown	Keith Hart (wrestler)	1992	
Unknown	Lee Thomas	1994–1995	
Unknown	Lynn Fields	1993	
Unknown	Mad Dog	1992	
Unknown	The Master of Disaster	1992	
Unknown	Michael Collins	1993	
Mike Furnas	Mike Furnas	1993–1994	
Unknown	Mike Mason	1995	
Unknown	Mike Samson	1992–1995	
Unknown	Newton Stephie	1992	
Unknown	Paul Lee / Paul Miller	1991–1992	
Unknown	Richie Dye	1992	
Unknown	Rick Cannon	1992	
Unknown	Rick Newsome	1992	
Unknown	Rob Morgan	1993	
Unknown	Rock Regal	1993	
Unknown	Rocky Patterson	1992	
Unknown	Ron Cumberledge	1994	
Ron Davis	Ron Davis	1995	
Scott Campione	Scott Campione	1993	
Unknown	Scott Sandlin	1992	
Unknown	Scotty McKeever	1995	
Unknown	Shawn Power	1993	
Unknown	Silo Slim	1994	
Brian Stanley	Stan Lee	1993	
Unknown	Thunder Tiger	1992	
Unknown	T.J. Travis	1992	
Unknown	Tommy Pitner	1995	
Unknown	The Wolfman	1995	

=== Female wrestlers ===
Birth name:	Ring name(s):	Tenure:	Notes
Susan Green	Susan Green	1994	
Peggy Lee^{†}	Peggy Lee Leather	1994	
Selina Majors	Bambi	1994	
Jacqueline Moore	Sgt. Rock	1995	
Candi Devine^{†}	Candi Devine	1994	
Patty Seymour	Leilani Kai	1994	
Debbie Szostecki	Debbie Combs	1994	

=== Stables and tag teams ===
Tag team/Stable(s)	Members	Tenure(s)
The Armstrong Brothers	Scott and Steve Armstrong	1993–1995
Armstrong's Army	Bob Armstrong, Brad Armstrong,^{†} Scott Armstrong, Steve Armstrong, Bobby Blaze, Tracey Smothers,^{†} and The Rock 'n' Roll Express	1993–1995
The Batten Twins	Bart Batten and Brad Batten	1992–1995
The Bruise Brothers	Don Bruise and Ron Bruise	1993–1994
The Dynamic Duo	Al Snow and Unabomb	1995
Federation of International Thugs and Eliminators	Bruiser Bedlam,^{†} Chris Walker, Killer Kyle, and The Funk Brothers	1994
The Funk Brothers	Dory Funk Jr. and Terry Funk^{†}	1994
The Furnas Brothers	Doug Furnas^{†} and Mike Furnas	1994
The Gangstas	New Jack^{†} and Mustafa Saed	1994–1995
The Hardy Boys	Jeff Hardy and Matt Hardy	1995
The Headbangers	Headbanger Mosh and Headbanger Thrasher	1995
The Infernos	Inferno of Fire and Gabriel Brimstone	1994–1995
The Moondogs	Moondog Rex,^{†} Moondog Spot^{†} and Moondog Splat	1993–1994
Jim Cornette's Militia	Gen. Jim Cornette, Lt. Buddy Landell,^{†} The Punisher, Tommy Rich, Terry Gordy,^{†} Sgt. Rock, and The Dynamic Duo	1995
The New Fantastics	Bobby Fulton and Jackie Fulton	1991–1993
The Party Patrol	Davey Rich and Johnny Rich	1992
PG-13	J. C. Ice and Wolfie D	1995
The Rock 'n' Roll Express	Ricky Morton and Robert Gibson	1992–1995
The Russians	Ivan Koloff^{†} and Vladimir Koloff	1991
The Steiner Brothers	Rick Steiner and Scott Steiner	1993–1995
The Thrillseekers	Chris Jericho and Lance Storm	1994
The THUGS	Tony Anthony and Tracey Smothers^{†}	1994–1995
Well Dunn	Timothy Well^{†} and Steven Dunn^{†}	1994

=== Managers and valets ===
Birth name:	Ring name(s):	Tenure:	Notes
Jim Cornette	Jim Cornette	1991–1995	
Randy Hales	Randy Hales	1995	
Brian Hildebrand^{†}	Hymie P. Schwartz / Dr. Mark Curtis	1992, 1994–1995	
James Mitchell	Daryl Van Horne	1993–1994	
Tammy Lynn Sytch	Tammy Fytch	1994	
Kimberly Wolser	Dirty White Girl	1994–1995	
Ronald Wright	Ron Wright	1992–1995	

=== Commentators and interviewers ===
Birth name:	Ring name(s):	Tenure:	Notes
Bob Caudle	Bob Caudle	1991–1995	
William Ensor ^{†}	Buddy Landel	1995	
Wayne Keown	Dutch Mantell	1991–1994	
Chip Kessler	Chip Kessler	1995	
Leslie Malady	Les Thatcher	1993–1995	
Tommy Noe	Tommy Noe	1991–1995	Ring announcer
Phil Rainey	Phil Rainey	1992	
Jim Ross	Jim Ross	1994–1995	
Lance Russell	Lance Russell	1993	
Scott Spangler †	Brian Matthews	1992–1994	Ring announcer

=== Referees ===
Birth name:	Ring name(s):	Tenure:	Notes
Brian Hildebrand ^{†}	Mark Curtis	1991–1995	Senior referee

Notes
^{†} Indicates they are deceased.
^{‡} Indicates they died while they were employed with Smoky Mountain Wrestling.
^{USWA} Indicates they were part of a talent exchange with the United States Wrestling Association.
^{WCW} Indicates they were part of a talent exchange with World Championship Wrestling.
^{WWF} Indicates they were part of a talent exchange with the World Wrestling Federation.
