= Jim Cornette =

American professional wrestling personality (born 1961)

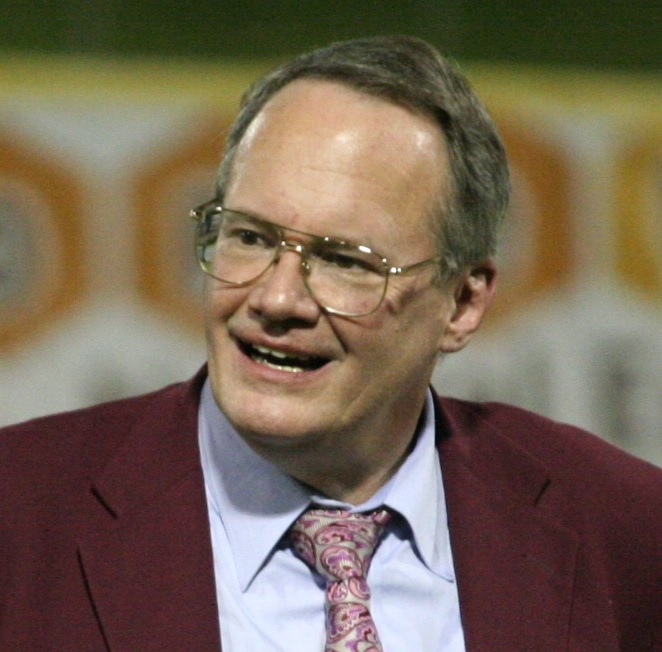
- Cornette in 2015

Personal information
- Born: James Mark Cornette; September 17, 1961 (age 65) Louisville, Kentucky, U.S.
- Spouses: Janice Crowl (m. 1987–2002); Stacey Goff (m. 2007)
- Website: jimcornette.com

Professional wrestling career
- Ring name(s): General Cornette; James E. Cornette; James Edward Cornette; James Cornette; Jim Cornette; Jimmy Cornette
- Billed height: 6 ft 0 in (183 cm)
- Billed weight: 231 lb (105 kg)
- Billed from: Louisville, Kentucky
- Debut: August 21, 1981
- Retired: November 2017 (as a manager); December 13, 2019 (as an announcer)

YouTube information
- Channel: Official Jim Cornette
- Years active: 2018–present
- Genres: Professional wrestling; comedy; politics; current events
- Subscribers: 479 thousand
- Views: 790 million
- Last updated: October 20, 2026

James Mark Cornette (born September 17, 1961) is an American author, sports historian, and podcaster who previously worked in the professional wrestling industry as an agent, booker, color commentator, manager, photographer, promoter, trainer, and occasional professional wrestler. Cornette is widely considered to be one of the greatest managers in wrestling history by fans and publications, as well as industry personnel. Cornette currently hosts two podcasts along with co-host and producer Brian Last—The Jim Cornette Experience and Jim Cornette's Drive-Thru— with the latter being the most-played wrestling podcast as of July 2026 and both being among the most popular wrestling podcasts of all time.

During his career, he has worked for the Continental Wrestling Association, Mid-South Wrestling, World Class Championship Wrestling, Jim Crockett Promotions, World Championship Wrestling, the World Wrestling Federation (now called WWE), Total Nonstop Action Wrestling (also called Impact Wrestling), and Ring of Honor. From 1991 to 1995, he was the owner and booker of Smoky Mountain Wrestling, and from 1999 to 2005, was the co-owner, head booker, and head trainer of Ohio Valley Wrestling. Both promotions served as talent pools/developmental programs for the WWF/WWE and produced many notable alumni. During the later years of his career, Cornette focused primarily on backstage positions and transitioned away from his role as an on-screen manager.

In 2017, Cornette retired from managing. During a transitional period prior to the retirement, he worked as an on-screen "authority figure" character in Total Nonstop Action Wrestling and Ring of Honor, promotions where he also held backstage positions. Cornette has also had an extensive commentary career, most recently serving as a color commentator for Major League Wrestling, What Culture Pro Wrestling, and the National Wrestling Alliance. Cornette is a member of the NWA, Wrestling Observer Newsletter, Memphis, and Professional Wrestling Halls of Fame. Cornette is also noted for his long-standing real-life feud with former professional wrestling booker Vince Russo. In June 2017, Russo filed a restraining order (EPO) against Cornette for stalking, which Cornette mocked and then sold copies of. The Cornette vs. Russo feud has been featured on two episodes of Viceland's Dark Side of the Ring series.

Outside of wrestling, Cornette is known for his left-wing political views – Cornette, an atheist and democratic socialist, has appeared on The Young Turks to document his criticisms of religious and right-wing causes.

== Early life ==
Cornette was born in Louisville, Kentucky on September 17, 1961, to Doug Cornette (Oct. 24th 1914–1968), an executive with The Louisville Courier-Journal and The Louisville Times, and Thelma Cornette (Oct. 21st 1933–2002), a secretary for the Louisville Chamber of Commerce. His father died when he was seven years old. From the age of nine, Cornette had a love for wrestling, claiming that, as a youth, he installed a ten-foot antenna on top of his house so he could watch as much regional wrestling as possible.

== Professional wrestling career ==
=== Early career (1976–1982) ===
Cornette began working at wrestling events at the age of 14, serving as a photographer, ring announcer, timekeeper, magazine correspondent, and public relations correspondent. During this time, from attending matches at the Louisville Gardens, Cornette got to know promoter Christine Jarrett, who was the mother of Jerry Jarrett, promoter of the Continental Wrestling Association (commonly known as the "Memphis territory"). Cornette has credited her as a major influence on his early career and praised her business acumen. Cornette's photography from the Memphis territory was regularly published in Gong, a Japanese pro wrestling magazine, between 1977 and 1982.

=== Continental Wrestling Association (1982–1983) ===
By 1982, Cornette was writing programs for arena shows, having photographs published in wrestling magazines, and contributing to the Championship Wrestling Magazine. In August, he traveled to Memphis to see the TV match between Jerry Lawler and Ric Flair. After the show ended, Cornette was offered a wrestling managerial role on television by promoter Jerry Jarrett. As Cornette has recalled, despite his presence being tolerated at shows and TV tapings for nearly a decade, the first time he was allowed into the locker room was only after he had become a manager.

Before making his managing debut, Cornette decided to adapt the ring name James E. Cornette in tribute to legendary wrestling promoter James E. Barnett. Cornette made his ringside debut on September 25, 1982, managing Sherri Martel, who herself would later become a wrestling manager. Cornette was given the gimmick of a rich kid turned inept manager whose clients kept firing him after one match. The most notable wrestlers in this angle were Dutch Mantell and Crusher Broomfield (who would later gain fame as One Man Gang and Akeem "The African Dream"). Over the next 14 months Cornette also managed Jesse Barr, "Exotic" Adrian Street, and a trio called the "Cornette Dynasty" consisting of Carl Fergie, Norman Frederick Charles III, and the Angel Frank Morrell. After a short-lived run in Georgia through a deal Jarrett had with Ole Anderson, Cornette returned to Memphis in July 1983, and worked as co-manager alongside Jimmy Hart.

=== Mid-South Wrestling (1983–1984) ===
==== Formation of The Midnight Express ====
In November 1983, Mid-South promoter Bill Watts recognized his business was down and was looking to reinvigorate his territory. Watts asked Jerry Jarrett and Jerry Lawler to visit a TV taping and offer their opinions. Jarrett suggested a talent trade and invited Watts to Memphis to see who he liked. After watching a Memphis TV taping, Watts took singles performers Dennis Condrey and Bobby Eaton to create a new tag team, and also took the existing team of Ricky Morton and Robert Gibson as The Rock 'n' Roll Express. Watts also noticed the brash young manager in Cornette, and in his own words, recalled "He was so obnoxious I wanted to slap him", and "I knew he was instant box office if he could get me that riled up".

As the more senior Jimmy Hart was still required by Jarrett, Watts took Cornette to manage his new team, who decided on the name The Midnight Express. Notable wrestlers in the trade who left Mid-South for Memphis included Rick Rude and Jim Neidhart.

Mid-South Wrestling had at that point been a territory featuring bigger wrestlers, and Cornette has stated that The Midnight Express, the Rock 'n' Roll Express, and himself were probably the five smallest members of the roster when he arrived. The influx of the new talent had an immediate impact, and business first rebounded and then skyrocketed. It was during this time that Cornette acquired his tennis racquet which became his trademark. He said that he had seen a college film at the time with an obnoxious rich kid carrying a badminton racquet, so he decided on a tennis racquet. At times Cornette loaded the racquet with a horseshoe to guard against aggressive fans.

==== Feud with Magnum T. A. and Mr. Wrestling II ====
Cornette and The Midnight Express debuted on Mid-South television on November 26, 1983. After the first few weeks in the territory the team faced the Mid-South tag team champions Magnum T. A. and Mr. Wrestling II. At a TV taping for a contract signing for an upcoming championship match, the Midnights and Cornette attacked Magnum T. A. and tarred and feathered him. The feud continued through to early March 1984, when The Midnight Express won the Mid-South tag team titles after Mr. Wrestling II walked out on his partner during a match.

==== The Last Stampede ====
At a TV taping on March 14, 1984, Cornette and the Midnights staged a celebration for winning the tag team titles, complete with champagne and birthday cake. While Cornette's back was turned, The Rock 'n' Roll Express ran in and shoved Cornette's face in the cake. Cornette was enraged afterwards when Bill Watts replayed the incident on TV as he thought it was funny. This led to a heated altercation between the two, which ended with Watts slapping Cornette. In following weeks, the Midnight Express and Cornette attacked and bloodied Watts leading him to come out of retirement.

In a series of matches termed "The Last Stampede", Watts and his masked teammate Stagger Lee (suspected to be Junkyard Dog under a mask) faced the Midnight Express and Cornette all through the territory. The stipulations were simple; if the Midnights won Cornette would run Mid-South Wrestling for 60 days; if they lost, Cornette would be stripped down and forced to wear either a diaper or a dress (the outfits varied by venue). Over 5 weeks, the Last Stampede series shattered box office records for Mid-South, with a record gate and attendance at the Sam Houston Coliseum in Texas, combined attendance of 20,000 people in Tulsa and Oklahoma City (on the same day), and a crowd of 23,000 people at the New Orleans Superdome.

==== Rock 'n' Roll Express rivalry ====
Cornette's time in Mid-South was also notable as it marked the beginning of the rivalry with the Rock 'n' Roll Express. Starting in May 1984 immediately following the Last Stampede series, the two teams feuded the remainder of the year to packed crowds throughout the territory. In particular, the two teams set attendance records in Houston, Tulsa and Oklahoma City, making 1984 the most successful year in Mid-South history, and The Midnight Express and Cornette national stars.

==== Watts' style and influence ====
Cornette has consistently acknowledged that Bill Watts's philosophy of believable and credible wrestling, with an unwavering emphasis on toughness, athleticism and serious presentation, has had a major impact on how he thinks the business should be promoted. He has described the promotion as a military school for wrestling, where Watts' strict enforcement of kayfabe, exhausting travel schedule and passionate fans made it a learning experience like no other. Cornette maintains enormous respect for Watts as a promoter, citing his ability to attract huge TV ratings and consistently sold-out arenas in a low population area, and describing Watts as a genius. At the same time, he acknowledges the grind of constant matches, long drives, and fan riots was a grueling test of endurance. At one point, Cornette worked 103 days straight before being ordered by doctors to have two to four weeks' bed rest. As events transpired, he took six days off before returning to action.

In describing Mid-South Wrestling, Cornette has offered the following example: "Two weeks of our lives, fourteen days, we did two one hour TV shows, fifteen house shows, two all day promo sets, drove 4,700 miles in a car while doing that, and I can't speak for anybody else, but I made — and I was only 22 years old, and just pleased as Punch to be there — $5,600 [equivalent to $17,400 in 2025] for two weeks. In 1984. Not bad."

=== World Class Championship Wrestling (1984–1985) ===
The Midnight Express with Cornette had a short stay in World Class Championship Wrestling (WCCW) in Texas where they feuded mainly with The Fantastics (Bobby Fulton and Tommy Rogers). When opportunities in WCCW looked to go nowhere, The Midnight Express started to look elsewhere for employment and what they found would give the team national and international exposure. Cornette later reflected that they were willing to give Dallas a try, as they welcomed living in a modern city, as well as the easier travel schedule when compared to Mid-South. However, the inability to get any rivalry with the Von Erichs—and therefore main event money—made the decision to leave for Charlotte an easy one.

=== Jim Crockett Promotions/World Championship Wrestling (1985–1990, 1993) ===
==== Managing the Midnight Express (1985–1990) ====
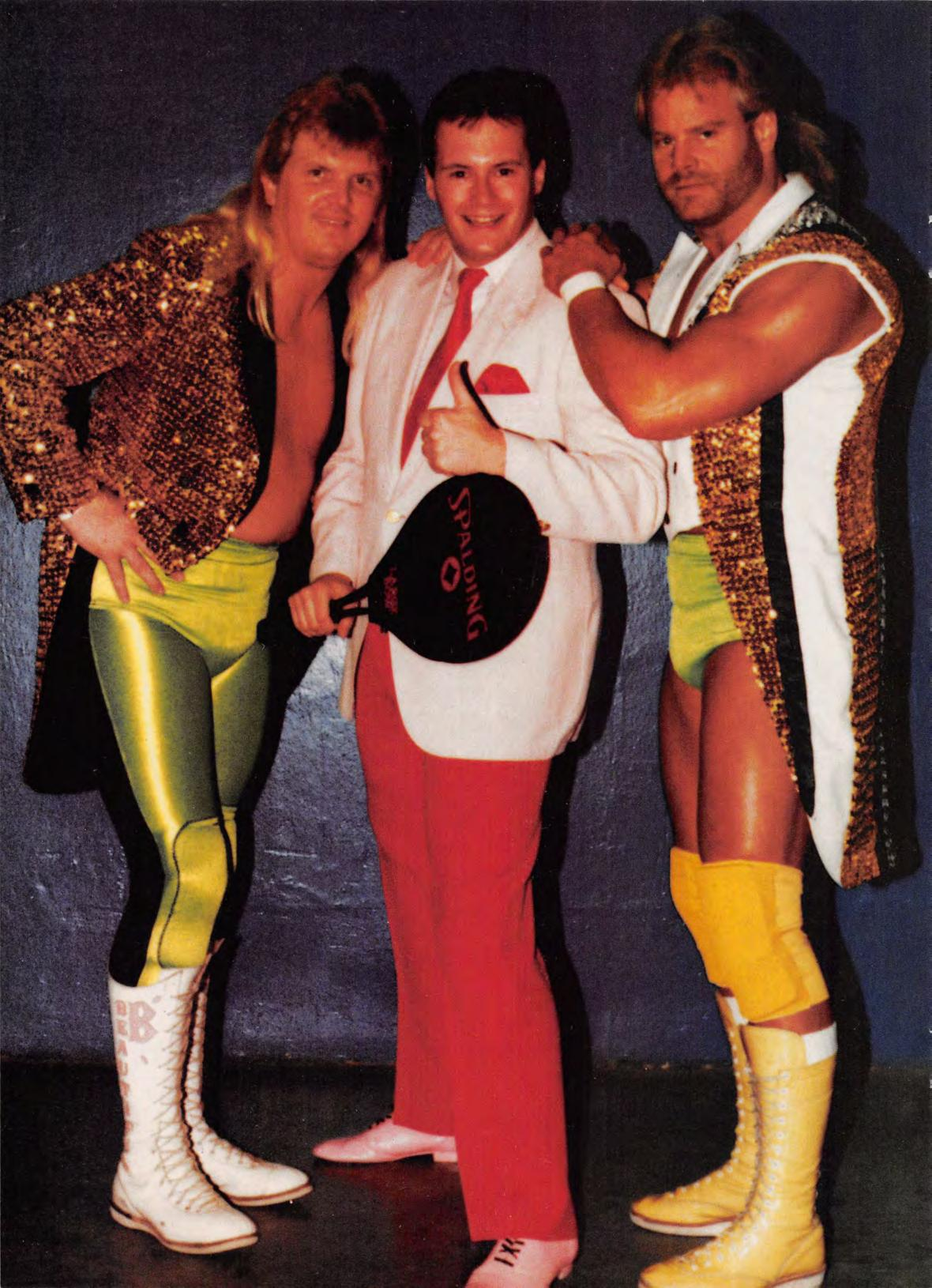
Cornette (center) with Bobby Eaton and Stan Lane

Cornette and the Midnight Express spent five years at Jim Crockett Promotions/World Championship Wrestling. After Condrey left the company in early 1987, he was replaced with Stan Lane. With Cornette as manager, each version of the team were National Wrestling Alliance (NWA) World tag team champions (Condrey and Eaton for six months in 1986, Eaton and Lane for a few weeks in late 1988). In addition, Eaton and Lane were three-time NWA United States Tag Team Champions. As a manager, Cornette was known for both his loud mouth and for his ever-present tennis racket, which Cornette often used to ensure victory for his wrestlers, with the implication that the racket case was loaded. Cornette was at his best as a heel manager; fans loved to see the constantly yelling Cornette and his equally annoying charges beaten and humiliated. He and the Midnights were so hated, in fact, that they had to be escorted by police to and from the ring at the house shows and have a police escort to the city limits for fear of being attacked by overzealous fans.

Cornette suffered a severe knee injury during a scaffold match between The Midnight Express and The Road Warriors at Starrcade '86: The Skywalkers. In a shoot interview, Cornette recounted that Dusty Rhodes convinced him to perform a dangerous stunt where he would fall off of the high scaffold. The idea was that Paul Ellering, the manager of The Road Warriors, would chase Cornette up the scaffold. Once he was there, he would be met by Road Warrior Animal, who would assist him in getting underneath the scaffold, where Cornette would hang and then drop when ready; the idea was that, as Cornette recalled Rhodes saying, was that Condrey and Eaton would catch him like "they catch the girls at the football games." What neither Cornette nor his charges knew at the time was that the scaffold that the match was to take place on was approximately 25 feet off of the ground, which left for a drop of 21 feet to the ring mat below. Cornette estimated that his positioning before the drop, factoring in the scaffold and his height of just over six feet, would still result in 14-foot drop. Suffering from acrophobia, Cornette said it was "way too goddamned far" and that Condrey and Eaton would not have been able to catch him. Discussing alternatives, the three men decided to have their ally, Big Bubba Rogers, be the one to catch Cornette. Rogers, however, was impeded due to, as part of his character, wearing dark sunglasses inside the arena, and so he misjudged his position in the ring. Cornette landed flat on his feet, three feet away from Rogers, and his head whiplashed back into Rogers' knees knocking him temporarily senseless. Cornette tore all the ligaments in one of his knees, broke a bone and damaged the cartilage. The injury was so extensive that when Cornette finally saw a doctor to have the knee drained, the amount of blood and fluid filled an entire bedpan. Cornette later said that he knew he might get seriously hurt when he was told he would have to fall off a scaffold, but that performing in front of such a large audience was more important than his own health.

In 1989, Cornette became the color commentator for Jim Crockett Promotions' nationally syndicated NWA television show, and later took over the same role on the Saturday night TBS broadcasts alongside play-by-play announcer Jim Ross.

In 1989, Cornette became a booker on WCW's creative team. As such, Cornette helped write storylines and shape the format of its television shows. Due to friction and animosity between himself and WCW head Jim Herd, Cornette quit the company after Halloween Havoc 1990.

==== Return and managing the Heavenly Bodies (1993) ====
In early 1993, Cornette briefly returned to World Championship Wrestling (WCW) as part of a talent trade with Smoky Mountain Wrestling (SMW). WCW executive vice president Bill Watts had brought The Rock 'n' Roll Express back into the company and billed them as the Smoky Mountain tag team champions, which incensed Cornette since his team The Heavenly Bodies (Stan Lane and Tom Prichard) were the reigning champions. On the February 6 episode of WCW Saturday Night, Jim Cornette, the Bodies and Bobby Eaton confronted the Express during an interview. Bill Watts came out and suggested the Bodies should wrestle the Express. Cornette objected since he claimed that they weren't dressed for it, but the match still took place. The Express won the match by DQ when Eaton interfered in the match, and after the match while Lane held Morton, Cornette put his tennis racket over Morton while Eaton delivered his "Alabama jam" on Morton. Cornette then struck referee Nick Patrick, and then Cornette helped his men beat up the Express.

The following week on Main Event, Watts appeared with Smoky Mountain commissioner Bob Armstrong, who demanded Cornette make a public apology. Cornette then interrupted the interview along with Eaton and the Heavenly Bodies, refusing to apologize and insulting the fans, Watts and Armstrong. Watts confirmed the Rock 'n' Roll Express were scheduled to face the Wrecking Crew (Rage and Fury) at SuperBrawl III, but suggested they wrestle the Heavenly Bodies instead. Armstrong agreed and issued Cornette with an ultimatum: if the Bodies did not wrestle the Express at SuperBrawl III, they would be stripped of the titles and Cornette would be heavily fined and suspended. Cornette was furious and claimed that he "hated WCW" and wanted no part of Superbrawl or the company. Later in the show, Eaton and the Bodies attacked two jobbers after a match, one being Joey Maggs, who were saved when the Rock 'n' Roll Express ran out and attacked Cornette and his men.

During Cornette's second stint in WCW, his Heavenly Bodies teamed with Steve Austin and Brian Pillman in 8-man tag team matches against the Express and the Unified tag team champions Ricky Steamboat and Shane Douglas. The Bodies, Austin and Pillman lost two of those matches, one on a February 27 episode of WCW WorldWide by DQ when Cornette interfered, and one by pinfall.

The feud between the Bodies and the Express continued over in SMW, where Bobby Eaton would participate alongside Lane and Prichard in six-man tag team matches. In one memorable segment, the Express were accompanied by a mysterious individual who stood silently at ringside covered with a white sheet. During a post-match interview Morton dared Cornette to investigate and, after some light-hearted poking and pushing, Cornette finally removed the sheet to reveal Arn Anderson, Eaton's former tag team partner in The Dangerous Alliance. As Cornette recoiled in shock, Eaton went to shake Anderson's hand but was punched to the ground, triggering a brawl between both teams. Anderson justified his actions by stating that after he was injured by Erik Watts during a confrontation at a gas station, Eaton never once called to see how he was doing. When the Bodies finally faced off against the Express at SuperBrawl III, Eaton arrived with Cornette but was ordered back to the dressing room. Typically, Cornette then tried to interfere in the match by climbing onto the ring apron to argue with the referee; however, the Express eventually won via pinfall when the returning Eaton accidentally hit Prichard instead of Morton. As a singles wrestler, Eaton was also very successful in Smoky Mountain, winning the SMW TV title. under Cornette's guidance.

=== Smoky Mountain Wrestling (1991–1995) ===
A firm believer in "old-school" territorial wrestling, Cornette began the Smoky Mountain Wrestling (SMW) promotion in 1991. SMW promoted shows in Tennessee, Kentucky, West Virginia, Georgia, and the Carolinas. By this point, however, the nature of U.S. wrestling had already changed irrevocably, leading Cornette to seek a working relationship with the World Wrestling Federation (WWF) in 1993. This did not change the new national perception that regional promotions were "minor league", and also did not help SMW's finances. Cornette shuttered SMW in November 1995 and sold all its rights and videos to the WWF. Cornette later said that he chose the wrong time to start a wrestling company because the business as a whole was in a recession.

=== World Wrestling Federation/Entertainment (1993–2005) ===
==== Camp Cornette (1993–1997) ====
Cornette went to the WWF in 1993 while still serving as promoter of SMW. As in other promotions, he held several positions in the WWF, including manager, color commentator and member of the booking committee. Cornette's most notable managerial role in the WWF was as the "American spokesperson" of WWF champion Yokozuna. He joined the WWF full-time in 1996 after the demise of SMW and had a major role in scouting and developing new talent.

On-screen, Cornette led a top heel stable of wrestlers referred to as "Camp Cornette". At any given time, Cornette's charges consisted of Yokozuna, Mantaur, Vader, Owen Hart and The British Bulldog. He also served as the manager of Tom Prichard and Jimmy Del Ray during their brief stint in the WWF. In September 1996, Clarence Mason (who is a real-life lawyer and was Cornette's storyline attorney) replaced Cornette as manager of Owen Hart and The British Bulldog, Cornette continued to manage Vader until January 1997 when Cornette was written off of television to work behind the scenes and Paul Bearer became Vader's new manager.

On the June 30, 1997, episode of Monday Night Raw, Cornette briefly returned to WWF television as the manager of the Arabian Butchers.

Cornette was also part of the television production staff during this time, but eventually left in part due to evolving conflicts with both writer Vince Russo and producer Kevin Dunn. Cornette later recounted that things came to a head in Halifax, Nova Scotia, in the summer of 1997. During a production meeting for Raw – which was to feature newly signed wrestler The Patriot – Cornette repeatedly tried to steer the discussion towards the treatment of what he thought was a new top-of-the-line heroic character. Dunn told Cornette that he found him "tiresome" for continuing to harp on about this issue, which enraged Cornette to the point where he mocked Dunn's buck teeth and threatened to assault him in front of everyone in the room. He was eventually forced to apologize to Dunn for his actions.

==== Color commentary; NWA invasion (1997–1999) ====
In late 1997, Cornette returned to television and became a member of the WWF announcing team, where he served as a color commentator. It was during this time that he also began performing a series of controversial "worked shoots" where he would praise what he felt was right and condemn what he felt was wrong in professional wrestling. Although the segments were produced by the WWF, Cornette did not hesitate to give praise to wrestlers in rival World Championship Wrestling (WCW) that he felt deserved it.

In 1998, Cornette led an NWA invasion based on the old Crockett Promotions territory, with a stable including Jeff Jarrett, Barry Windham and The Rock 'n' Roll Express. Later that year, Cornette managed Dan Severn and a new version of The Midnight Express before stepping back from management, and also provided color commentary (on Monday Night Raw, Shotgun Saturday Night, Sunday Night Heat and the first episode of SmackDown) before disappearing from television altogether in the fall of 1999.

==== Ohio Valley Wrestling (1999–2005) ====
In July 1999, Cornette became head booker and part-owner of WWF's lead developmental territory, Ohio Valley Wrestling (OVW), then being run by Nightmare Danny Davis. As a talent developer in Smoky Mountain, he had already been instrumental in the careers of then-current and former WWF stars Kane, D'Lo Brown, Sunny and Al Snow, and WWE also credits Cornette with helping foster other world-famous superstars, including John Cena, Batista, Randy Orton and Brock Lesnar.

In March 2001, Cornette returned to WWF television for one night at WrestleMania X-Seven in Houston to participate in the Gimmick Battle Royal, but was quickly eliminated by Hillbilly Jim.

In May 2005, Cornette was suspended for several weeks by WWE after slapping OVW developmental wrestler Johnny Geo Basco (Anthony Carelli) backstage after Carelli had "no-sold" fellow wrestler The Boogeyman by laughing at him during a live OVW event. Shortly after Cornette returned from his suspension, a separate incident occurred and the WWE released him from his contract in July 2005. In the spring of 2007, Carelli, who had since been called up to the WWE as Santino Marella, appeared on a Canadian radio program where he publicly challenged Cornette to a match despite Cornette working for rival promotion TNA at the time. Since beginning his podcasting days, Cornette has looked back on Carelli's actions as the last straw and cited burnout from time working in OVW, while still putting down Carelli as a comedy 'joke' wrestler.

=== Extreme Championship Wrestling (1997) ===
In June 1997, Cornette made a surprise appearance on the Extreme Championship Wrestling (ECW) show Orgy of Violence, assisting Jerry Lawler and attacking Tommy Dreamer with his tennis racket as part of a WWF-ECW rivalry angle.

=== Total Nonstop Action Wrestling (2006–2009) ===
In 2006, Cornette joined Total Nonstop Action Wrestling as the new face of TNA's management. He held the title of "Management Director" according to the press releases following his premiere at the Slammiversary PPV event on June 18, 2006, in Orlando, Florida. After a brief speech, he departed, but returned at the end of the show in light of the "Orlando Screwjob", taking the NWA World Heavyweight Championship belt after Jeff Jarrett, Larry Zbyszko and Earl Hebner successfully executed a worked screwjob on Christian Cage and Sting. Matt Morgan had also become Cornette's on-screen bodyguard to prevent harm to his physical being, until leaving that post to become a full-time wrestler. Cornette was released from TNA on September 15, 2009. He has said that he was released because he was not "100 percent" behind TNA's creative team, headed by Vince Russo.

=== Ring of Honor (2009–2012) ===
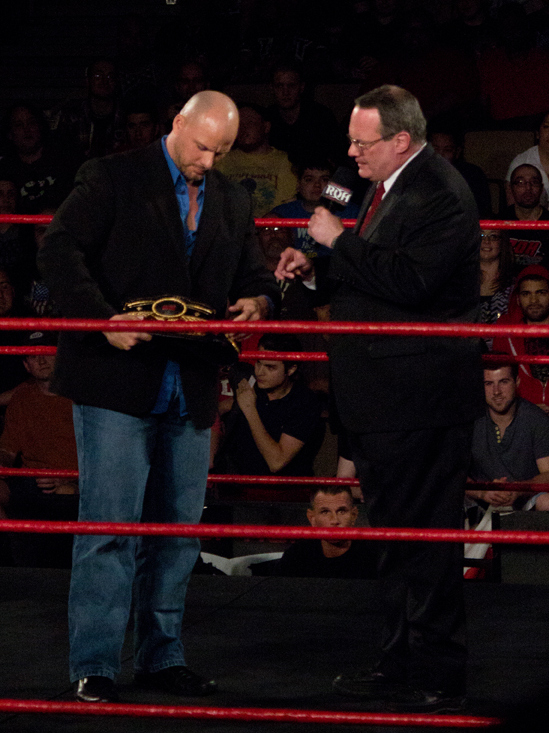
Cornette (right) with Adam Pearce

In 2009, Cornette signed a contract with Ring of Honor (ROH) to be their executive producer for the Ring of Honor Wrestling show on HDNet.

Cornette made his surprise return to ROH at Glory By Honor VIII: The Final Countdown on September 26, announcing he was the new executive producer for the show. Cornette made his first appearance on Ring of Honor Wrestling on the December 7 episode and immediately made waves by putting ROH champion Austin Aries into a four-way title match later that night and created the Pick 6 contender series. Backstage, Cornette worked under booker Hunter Johnston, who wrestles as Delirious.

On the edition of January 21 of Ring of Honor television, Cornette announced that chairshots to the head were banned and anyone that did so would be fined $5,000. On the February 4 telecast, Cornette made another ban in which the piledriver — in any form — was banned.

In October 2012, ROH wrote Cornette off television by having him suffer storyline injuries at the hands of Jay Lethal. In November 2012, it was revealed that Cornette had left the promotion. The reason for Cornette's absence stems from an outburst he had at the November 3 ROH television taping. At the taping, ROH talent Steve Corino suffered an injury, and no ROH officials were still at the venue to be able to pay for Corino's immediate medical attention or even arrange for an ambulance to be called. This left Corino in pain for hours and Cornette to be the only person there with enough power to handle the situation. Following his departure from Ring of Honor, Cornette decided to take an extended break from professional wrestling to focus on his health and work on personal projects.

=== Ohio Valley Wrestling (2010–2011) ===
On September 8, 2010, Ohio Valley Wrestling announced that Cornette would resume his duties as the head booker of the promotion. Cornette left OVW in November 2011, when the promotion announced a working agreement with TNA.

=== What Culture Pro Wrestling (2016–2017) ===
On October 6, 2016, Cornette made his first appearance doing color commentary in two years, debuting for What Culture Pro Wrestling at their Refuse to Lose event in Newcastle upon Tyne, England. He would be joined on the announce team by his long-time friend Jim Ross, who he had not done commentary with in over fifteen years. He then provided commentary for their next event True Legacy, which took place a few days later. Cornette returned to WCPW at their April 1, 2017 State of Emergency event. At the event, Cornette and Matt Striker provided commentary for the British promotion's debut in the United States.

=== WWE appearances (2017–2020) ===
On March 31, 2017, Jim Cornette made his first appearance with WWE in 12 years when he inducted The Rock 'n' Roll Express into the WWE Hall of Fame Class of 2017. Cornette was also featured in an episode of the WWE Network Original series Table For 3 alongside Eric Bischoff and Michael Hayes. Since then, Cornette made more appearances for WWE, starring in an episode of the WWE Network Original Series Photo Shoot in March 2018, and an episode of Story Time in October 2020.

Many fans and wrestlers, notably Dwayne Johnson, have continued to lobby for Cornette to be inducted into the WWE Hall of Fame.

=== Return to Impact Wrestling (2017) ===
Cornette returned to Impact Wrestling, which had formerly been known as TNA, and was attempting to rebrand as Global Force Wrestling (GFW), on August 17, 2017, at Destination X and fired Bruce Prichard. Cornette stated that he was put in charge by Impact's parent company, Anthem Sports & Entertainment, to resolve the Unified GFW World Heavyweight Championship situation. Cornette made the decision to book Low Ki as the twentieth entrant in the GFW World Heavyweight Championship gauntlet match. On September 18, Cornette confirmed he was done with the company. He had been brought in by Jeff Jarrett and the original agreement only included one set of tapings. With Jarrett out of the company, the new creative team was said to be more focused on in-ring action and less on authority figures. According to Cornette, there was no "heat" between him and the company.

=== National Wrestling Alliance (2018–2019) ===
The National Wrestling Alliance (NWA) chose Jim Cornette to be the color commentator for the NWA 70th Anniversary show that took place on October 21, 2018. This was the first pay-per-view promoted by the NWA in years. Cornette was joined on commentary by Tony Schiavone for the main event NWA World Heavyweight Championship match between Nick Aldis and Cody Rhodes.

He returned to the promotion for the NWA's Crockett Cup tournament on April 27, 2019. On September 12, Cornette was announced as part of the commentary team for the NWA's weekly studio series, NWA Power. However, on the NWA Power episode broadcast on November 19 during a match between Nick Aldis and Trevor Murdoch, Cornette made the remark "[Trevor Murdoch] is the only man I've ever known that can strap a bucket of fried chicken on his back and ride a motor scooter across Ethiopia. Trevor Murdoch can take care of himself!" Later on the same day, the NWA apologized for the racist overtones of the comment and pulled down the episode to remove the remark. The next day, Cornette left the NWA. Cornette had previously made the same comment on commentary during the March 6, 1995 episode of Monday Night Raw.

=== Major League Wrestling (2019) ===
Cornette debuted for Major League Wrestling (MLW) as a color commentator for the March 2, 2019 event Intimidation Games in Chicago, Illinois. He then returned to the commentary desk for their April 2019 events, Rise of the Renegades and Battle Riot II. From the start, he would also work unofficially in an agent-like role for the company. This included coaching younger talent on their television presentation and promos. In March he confirmed he is not signed exclusively to the company, but is open to continually working with them. After immediately being uncertain of his future with them, Cornette continued to do commentary for them, working Fury Road in June and their following event in July. It was reported that following that show he was not signed on for any further shows, as Tony Schiavone had finished his sports commitments and returned to the MLW commentary table.

Cornette announced on the December 13, 2019 episode of his Experience podcast that he was retired from announcing/commentary.

== Podcasting career ==
Cornette currently hosts two podcasts, The Jim Cornette Experience and Jim Cornette's Drive-Thru, along with co-host Brian Last. In early April 2020, Cornette's YouTube channel exceeded 100,000 subscribers, earning him a Silver Play Button. Both shows were among the most listened to wrestling podcasts in 2021, 2022, 2023, 2024 and 2025, with co-host Last going so far as to say the podcasts were "the biggest thing in wrestling."

=== Colin Thomson and LiveOne controversy ===
In July 2023, Cornette and Last received mainstream attention when they became two of the first podcasters to publicly accuse Kast Media and its CEO Colin Thomson of habitual non-payment. Cornette and Last had been clients of Kast Media, which sold advertising for their podcasts and provided hosting. It was reported that Kast Media was being acquired by PodcastOne and that in lieu of full payment, Thomson offered creators partial compensation combined with stock. It was also reported that PodcastOne intended to hire Thomson. Similar accusations were soon made by Theo Von, Jason Ellis, Brendan Schaub, Bryan Callen, Whitney Cummings, and Alyx Weiss, who stated they were owed money by Kast Media, including several six-figure and seven-figure shortages. Amid the news, LiveOne and PodcastOne stock dropped considerably and the company no longer planned to officially hire Thomson. In the months following the initial accusations, Cornette and Last have mockingly discussed the stock price of both companies. In February 2025, Cornette and Last sued podcast network Kast Media.

== Views on professional wrestling ==
Journalist Justin Barrasso of Sports Illustrated wrote in 2019 that "Cornette remains one of wrestling's more controversial personalities, but his beliefs are rooted in more than four decades of wrestling experience".

Cornette has been very vocal against niche styles of wrestling, such as Paul Heyman's Extreme Championship Wrestling (ECW) hardcore style, which he referred to as "hardcore bullshit". "Comedy wrestling" (that which is deemed silly or goofy as opposed to serious) has also been on the receiving end of his rants, with him routinely criticizing those he considers "comedy wrestlers" such as Orange Cassidy, Young Bucks, Joey Ryan, Kenny Omega, Riho and Chuck Taylor. He has also criticized the physical appearance of wrestlers; such as Marko Stunt's height or Joey Janela's unathletic body composition.

Cornette has garnered support for his opinions from industry personalities including former NWA Worlds Heavyweight Champion Nick Aldis, who wrote an article for Flagged Sports defending Cornette and his position as NWA commentator after a separate article asked promoters to stop hiring him and AEW owner, general manager and promoter Tony Khan - whom Cornette and Last have often critiqued - has also defended him on multiple occasions, citing his longevity in the business and his right to criticize the industry.

=== Conflicts with Vince Russo ===
Cornette worked with writer Vince Russo in the WWF during the 1990s and in TNA during the 2000s, and regularly conflicted with him due to his views on the business, which emphasize entertainment storylines over actual in-ring action to the point of intense hatred on Cornette's part. Cornette has criticized Russo publicly since his departure from TNA in 2009, which Cornette has stated was a result of his lack of support for Russo's creative direction.

In March 2010, Cornette sent then-TNA official Terry Taylor an email in which he said: "I want Vince Russo to die. If I could figure out a way to murder him without going to prison, I would consider it the greatest accomplishment of my life." TNA sent the letter to a California law firm, who characterized his comments as a "terroristic threat" and said "any further threats to contact Vince Russo or any other TNA personnel (directly or indirectly) shall be viewed as acts in furtherance of such threats and shall be pursued and prosecuted accordingly."

During a 2017 podcast, Cornette challenged Russo to a fight. Russo responded by filing a restraining order (EPO) against Cornette for "stalking him across state lines since 1999". As a response, Cornette began selling autographed copies of the restraining order on his personal website, with all proceeds being donated to the Crusade for Children.

The Russo vs. Cornette rivalry was prominently featured in Viceland's Dark Side of the Ring episodes covering the Montreal Screwjob and WWF's Brawl for All, which aired in 2019 and 2020 respectively. This included a promise by Cornette to urinate on Russo's gravestone - something that he has discussed on his podcast more since the initial airing.

Cornette also noted on his podcast in 2021 an incident with Russo where he wanted to book multiple disqualification finishes on a Raw episode, leading to Cornette calling him out in front of the writing team. Russo then went over Cornette's head to McMahon, who went to Jim Ross who later asked Cornette to apologize. Cornette refused, continuing a feud that has lasted now for over 20 years.

=== Views on All Elite Wrestling ===
All Elite Wrestling (AEW) executives The Young Bucks have accused Cornette of being a shock jock who says disparaging things about the company to get listeners for his podcast. Dave Meltzer of Wrestling Observer Newsletter agreed with the shock jock characterization and alleged Cornette had influenced a fan that tried to run into an AEW ring in July 2021. However, Meltzer also noted that Cornette condemned the fan for his actions.

AEW commentator Jim Ross defended him and referred to him as a "Kentucky-fried Howard Stern" but said he had always had outspoken views and that he just has a bigger platform now. Ross said that some of these traits had made him "arguably the best manager ever." AEW founder and promoter Tony Khan also defended him, has said that much of Cornette's criticisms of the promotion are fair and he credits him as being a major influence on his booking career. FTR, a team inspired by Cornette's Midnight Express, defended Cornette, saying that he was justified in giving critiques of AEW in all aspects due to his experience in the business.

== Personal life ==
Cornette and his longtime girlfriend Stacey Goff were married October 31, 2007. Goff had previously worked as a manager in Cornette's OVW promotion under the ring name "Synn". Goff, as Synn, was the OVW manager of future WWE Champion Batista.

Cornette is a supporter of left-wing politics and has been described by Cenk Uygur as a "fire-breathing progressive". In September 2009, during a podcast interview on Who's Slamming Who?, he voiced his support for President Barack Obama's health care reform plans. Cornette had previously described himself as a Democrat and acknowledged having voted for Obama in the 2008 presidential election. Cornette is a critic of right-wing politics, condemning what he considers "fearmongering" from the Republican Party as well as controversially labeling former Alaska Governor Sarah Palin as "a useless twat". During Donald Trump's first presidency, Cornette frequently referred to Trump on his podcasts as "President Pigshit" and to Trump's wife Melania as "Melanoma" and "The First Cunt".

Cornette has been a vocal critic of other Republican politicians, such as Marjorie Taylor Greene and Lauren Boebert. Stan Lane, a member of the Midnight Express with Cornette, was erroneously said to have been Boebert's father on which Cornette did multiple segments, including an exchange with Last where Cornette realized the timeline of Boebert's birth and Lane's period in the wrestling territory lined up. His political beliefs and statements have earned him attention from the non-professional wrestling media, including an appearance on Internet news show The Young Turks.

On December 17, 2017, Cornette stated that he is a democratic socialist. In March 2018, Cornette voiced his support for the March for Our Lives rally; he made additional statements advocating for gun control and criticizing the National Rifle Association of America. In November 2023, Cornette publicly denounced the comments of Knox County, Tennessee mayor Glenn Jacobs, formerly Kane and an employee of Cornette's in SMW, over gun control.

Cornette endorsed Democratic candidate Kamala Harris for president in the 2024 election.

Cornette is an atheist and is highly critical of religion, mocking televangelists such as Benny Hinn and Pat Robertson.

Cornette has a criminal record which includes a number of assaults, mostly stemming from incidents involving fights with fans who attacked him while he was a manager in the 1980s. The record has made it difficult for him to work in Canada, and he was turned away from the Canadian border in November 2010.

A notable altercation involving the Midnight Express and fans at the Raleigh County Armory on May 29, 1987, eventually made its way to the Supreme Court of Appeals of West Virginia in Massey v. Jim Crockett Promotions, Inc. The case was cited in West Virginia law textbooks and studied in university. One of the issues in the case was whether it was possible for a person to string as many profanities in as short amount of time as the plaintiffs claim Cornette said that night.

Glenn Jacobs' predecessor as Knox County mayor, Tim Burchett, declared November 17, 2014 "Jim Cornette Day" during a Southeastern Championship Wrestling taping in Knoxville.

== Awards and accomplishments ==
- The Baltimore Sun
  - Non-Wrestler of the Year (2007)
- Cauliflower Alley Club
  - Other honoree (1997)
- Iconic Heroes Wrestling Excellence
  - Southern Wrestling Hall of Fame (2015)
- Memphis Wrestling Hall of Fame
  - Class of 2017
- National Wrestling Alliance
  - NWA Hall of Fame (Class of 2005)
- New England Pro Wrestling Hall of Fame
  - Class of 2015
- Pro Wrestling Illustrated
  - Manager of the Year (1985, 1993, 1995)
- Professional Wrestling Hall of Fame and Museum
  - Class of 2012
- World Wrestling Federation
  - Slammy Award (2 times)
    - Best Dressed (1994)
    - Blue Light Special for Worst Dresser (1996)
- Wrestling Observer Newsletter
  - Best Booker (1993, 2001, 2003)
  - Best Non-Wrestler (2006)
  - Best on Interviews (1985–1988, 1993)
  - Manager of the Year (1984–1990, 1992–1996)
  - Best Pro Wrestling Book (2009) Midnight Express 25th Anniversary Scrapbook
  - Wrestling Observer Newsletter Hall of Fame (Class of 1996)

== Bibliography ==
- Jim Cornette Presents: Behind the Curtain — Real Pro Wrestling Stories (2019) ISBN 978-1-68405-492-3
- Tuesday Night at the Gardens (2015) ISBN 978-1-50570-248-4
- Rags, Paper and Pins: The Merchandising of Memphis Wrestling (2013) ISBN 978-1-49040-122-5
- The Midnight Express & Jim Cornette 25th Anniversary Scrapbook (2009)
- Heroes & Friends - Pro Wrestling Remembrances (2025)
