= The Thugs =

Professional wrestling tag team

Tag team
- Members: "The Dirty White Boy" Tony Anthony; Tracy Smothers
- Name(s): The Thugs
- Billed heights: Tony Anthony: 5 ft 10 in (1.78 m); Tracy Smothers: 6 ft 2 in (1.88 m)
- Combined billed weight: 470 lb (210 kg)
- Billed from: Tennessee
- Debut: March 23, 1995
- Disbanded: November 26, 1995

The Thugs was a professional wrestling tag team that consisted of "The Dirty White Boy" Tony Anthony and Tracy Smothers. The team wrestled in Smoky Mountain Wrestling. It debuted on March 23, 1995, and existed until SMW's final show held on November 26, 1995.

== History ==
=== Feud with The Gangstas ===
The Thugs was a tag team that consisted of "The Dirty White Boy" Tony Anthony and Tracy Smothers. The duo first wrestled as a tag team on March 23, 1995, where Dirty White Boy acted as Smothers' partner in a tag team match against The Gangstas (New Jack and Mustafa Saed) during Smothers' feud with Gangstas. In those days, Boo Bradley was the partner of Tracy Smothers but Dirty White Boy would occasionally team with Smothers against Gangstas. Dirty White Boy and Smothers went on to lose the match. The next day, on March 24, Dirty White Boy replaced Boo Bradley in a tag team match where Smothers and Bradley took on The Gangstas but just got pinned. Dirty White Boy and Tracy Smothers would not team up together for two shows in March because Smothers and Bradley feuded with Gangstas while Dirty White Boy feuded with Buddy Landel.

Smothers was not having a proper partner to beat The Gangstas so he occasionally teamed up with Bob Armstrong, WWF's The Undertaker and Dirty White Boy. Dirty White Boy and Tracy Smothers became a permanent tag team on April 13 television taping of SMW defeating Larry Santo and The Wolfman. Later in the night, they also defeated Gangstas when Anthony pinned New Jack. Dirty White Boy and Smothers called themselves as The Thugs. The Thugs were a tag team that competed in main events of SMW shows as well as the SMW Tag Team Champions The Dynamic Duo (Al Snow and Unabomb). The Thugs went on to defeat Gangstas in a street fight on April 15. After the street fight, they defeated Gangstas in several normal matches. They faced Gangstas in two more street fights and a double chain match. The feud ended in a 6-man tag team match on May 27 when they lost to Gangstas and D'Lo Brown while Thugs teamed with Boo Bradley.

=== Feud with New Jack and D'Lo Brown ===
In June 1995, Both wrestlers focused once again on singles careers as Dirty White Boy had a singles feud with New Jack. After these four shows, Tracy Smothers returned on June 10 show and then the Thugs defeated New Jack and his partner D'Lo Brown. On June 12 television tapings of SMW, they defeated D'Lo Brown and his new partner Killer Kyle. The same night, they also defeated D'Lo Brown in another match with another partner, Larry Santo. The feud would end afterwards.

=== Feud with The Headbangers ===
On June 15, the Thugs defeated The Headbangers (Mosh and Thrasher) in a tag team match which culminated in a long feud between the two teams. On June 16 show, they defeated PG-13 (J. C. Ice and Wolfie D) and new rivals The Headbangers in a triple threat elimination tag team match. On the next four shows, they went on to receive four straight victories over The Headbangers in tag team matches. On June 29, Dirty White Boy defeated Thrasher in a singles match. Later in the night, Tracy Smothers defeated Mosh in a singles match. On June 30, they teamed with Boo Bradley and defeated The Headbangers and Killer Kyle in a six-man tag team match. The Thugs were more successful than The Headbangers in this feud.

After defeating the Headbangers on July 1, they defeated The Headbangers in a match on July 4 to become the number one contenders to the SMW Tag Team Championship. On July 6 television tapings of SMW, they defeated The Dynamic Duo to win the SMW Tag Team Championship. The same night, they made their first title defense which was against their rivals the Headbangers. They lost the match by getting disqualified thus retained their titles. They defeated the Headbangers in a non-title and title match. They had several defenses against Headbangers in the following weeks.

=== Feud with Dynamic Duo ===
The Thugs had begun a feud with the Dynamic Duo after subbing for The Rock 'n' Roll Express and defeating them for the SMW Tag Team Championship. However, the feud restarted in July after Thugs had successful title defenses against Dynamic Duo before they lost the titles to The Heavenly Bodies (Tom Prichard and Jimmy Del Ray) on Super Bowl of Wrestling. A week later, they participated in a Four Corners Elimination match for the titles and along with the Thugs and the Headbangers, they challenged Heavenly Bodies for the titles but Heavenly Bodies retained the titles. At Fire on the Mountain 1995: Night of the Dream Matches, they defeated Dynamic Duo in a loser leaves SMW match where the loser was forced to leave SMW.

=== Proposed feud with The Rock 'n' Roll Express ===
After winning the SMW Tag Team Championship, The Thugs and The Rock 'n' Roll Express were teasing a heated rivalry throughout July, and was scheduled to wrestle each other for the titles at the Super Bowl of Wrestling on August 4. However, hours before the event, a real-life altercation between Ricky Morton and Tracy Smothers' girlfriends forced Morton's suspension from the company, and The Heavenly Bodies took The Rock 'n' Roll Express place and won the titles.

=== Feud with Heavenly Bodies ===
After they lost the SMW Tag Team Championship to Heavenly Bodies, The Thugs started a program with Prichard and Del Rey. On August 12, they got a shot at the SMW Tag Team Championship against Heavenly Bodies. The champions intentionally got themselves disqualified to retain the titles. On August 13, they participated in Carolina Cup Tag Tournament where they defeated Tommy Rich and The Punisher in the first round, The Headbangers in the semifinals and SMW Tag Team Champions Heavenly Bodies in the finals. As a result of winning the tournament, they earned a shot at the titles against Heavenly Bodies on September 1 but the champions disqualified themselves to retain the belts. They got many future shots against Heavenly Bodies later that month. They participated in the final SMW show on SMW on November 26 teaming with Ricky Morton against Heavenly Bodies and Robert Gibson.

== Championships and accomplishments ==
- Smoky Mountain Wrestling

- SMW Tag Team Championship (1 time)
- Carolina Cup Tag Team Tournament
