= Smoky Mountain Wrestling =

American professional wrestling promotion

- Acronym: SMW
- Founded: October 30, 1991
- Defunct: December 1, 1995
- Style: Rasslin'
- Headquarters: Knoxville, Tennessee; Morristown, Tennessee
- Founder(s): Jim Cornette; Rick Rubin; Sandy Scott
- Owner(s): Jim Cornette (1991–1995)
- Parent: WWE (WWE Libraries) (since the 2000s)
- Successor: NWA Smoky Mountain (unofficial)

Smoky Mountain Wrestling was an independent professional wrestling promotion that held events in the Appalachian area of the United States from October 1991 to December 1995, when it was run by Jim Cornette. The promotion was based in Knoxville, Tennessee, with offices in Morristown, Tennessee.

== History and overview ==
=== Formation ===
Cornette formed the promotion in October 1991 upon leaving World Championship Wrestling, with Sandy Scott and backed financially by music producer Rick Rubin. The first events and TV tapings were held in October and November 1991. Matches from these shows were first shown in February 1992. The first Smoky Mountain Heavyweight Champion, "Primetime" Brian Lee, won the championship in a tournament held at Volunteer Slam on May 22, 1992, in Knoxville, Tennessee. The first Smoky Mountain Tag Team Champions were crowned in a tournament final at a TV taping on April 23, 1992, in Harrogate, Tennessee, when The Heavenly Bodies defeated The Fantastics; the match would air on May 9, 1992.

=== Territorial reach ===
Cornette had initially envisioned a territory reaching from Kentucky into as far as South Carolina and Georgia. Though they did eventually run events over that large of a region, including a few shows at the Cobb County Civic Center in Marietta, Georgia, the promotion's biggest towns included Knoxville, Tennessee, and Johnson City, Tennessee. SMW event tours also included high school gyms and fairs in cities throughout Tennessee, Kentucky, West Virginia, Virginia, and North Carolina.

In 1993, Smoky Mountain Wrestling signed deals with World Championship Wrestling and the World Wrestling Federation to showcase their wrestlers on the larger companies' shows. This led to The Rock 'n' Roll Express wrestling The Heavenly Bodies (Tom Prichard and Stan Lane) at SuperBrawl III in February 1993. The Heavenly Bodies (Prichard and Jimmy Del Ray) then faced The Steiner Brothers for the WWF Tag Team Championship at SummerSlam 1993, and then defeating The Rock 'n' Roll Express at Survivor Series 1993 for the SMW Tag Team Championship.

=== Notable talent ===
The promotion featured a number of wrestlers who were regulars in the Southeastern wrestling scene including the Heavenly Bodies, Stan Lane and Tom Prichard and later, Prichard and Jimmy Del Ray. The Heavenly Bodies, managed by Jim Cornette, were featured heavily throughout the years as they worked storyline feuds with The Rock 'n' Roll Express, The Fantastics and The Armstrong Family (especially Bob Armstrong). Smoky Mountain Wrestling also featured a number of younger wrestlers who had not yet made their mark on a national stage, including Bob Holly, New Jack, Al Snow, Balls Mahoney, Chris Jericho, Glenn Jacobs (then known as Unabomb, later better known under the ring name Kane), Lance Storm, Chris Candido, Tammy Lynn Sytch, Brian Girard James (B.G. James / Road Dogg) and D'Lo Brown, but ultimately, like most independents, was not financially successful. Cornette eventually signed a working agreement with the World Wrestling Federation to trade talent, manage, and serve as an on-air talent for that company.

Brian Hildebrand was a Smoky Mountain mainstay, occupying such myriad roles as Head of Merchandise, referee (under his alter ego Mark Curtis), and sound director.

=== Style and controversy ===
Cornette, a traditionalist, catered to fans that Mick Foley described as "old-time fans...who still believed in good guys and bad guys, and to whom cheating was still reason to get upset." Bob Caudle, who was the play-by-play announcer on the TV program, would also proclaim at the beginning of each show that Smoky Mountain Wrestling was "professional wrestling the way it used to be, and the way you like it." This was in sharp contrast to ECW, in which edgy angles, "tweeners" and anti-heroes increasingly took precedence over clear-cut heroes and villains. Smoky Mountain was, however, the birthplace of the controversial "Gangstas" gimmick, where black wrestlers New Jack and Mustafa would cut promos about activist Medgar Evers, while also using fried chicken and watermelon as props. The gimmick, among other things, led to the end of the friendship between Cornette and Mark Madden and their ongoing feud to this day, as Madden--who at the time was coming off the heels of getting Bill Watts fired from WCW after informing Hank Aaron of Watts' employment within the Turner Broadcasting System following publications of controversial comments made by Watts--had called the Gangstas gimmick racist. The promotion also caused controversy when they gave Chris Powers "The StormTrooper" gimmick, whose uniform, including mask were emblazoned with Swastikas, and upon entering the ring, would raise their arm to the crowd.

=== National Wrestling Alliance ===
The promotion had a brief association with the National Wrestling Alliance (NWA), whose flagship promotion Eastern Championship Wrestling had split away in August 1994, leaving the NWA with no World Heavyweight Champion. A 10-man tournament was held in Cherry Hill, New Jersey in November, featuring many SMW wrestlers; the participants were Tracy Smothers, Devon Storm, Eddie Gilbert, Johnny Gunn, Chris Candido, Al Snow, Dirty White Boy, Jerry Lawler, Lou Perez, and Osamu Nishimura. The winner was Chris Candido, who defended his title mostly at SMW events. In February 1995, however, Candido lost the belt to Ultimate Fighting Championship winner Dan Severn, who as a freelancer, decided to become a traveling World Champion, depriving SMW of a basis for World Heavyweight championship matches. However, in April 1995, The Rock 'n' Roll Express won the NWA World Tag Team Championship for the fifth time, giving SMW a handful of World Tag Team championship matches.

=== Demise ===
Though the promotion was highly thought of, it struggled to get a profitable television deal and had only aired on a handful of stations within the territory, as well as operated throughout a wrestling recession that would not end until the second half of 1996. In early 1995, due to the company not turning a profit and music projects taking up more of his time, Rubin pulled out of the deal and Cornette ended up financing the promotion himself. The last SMW show was held on November 26, 1995, in Cookeville, Tennessee (though it had been announced on SMW TV's November 25, 1995, episode that upcoming shows were to be held at the Collett Street Rec Center in Morganton, North Carolina on December 1, 1995, and at Cloudland High School in Roan Mountain, Tennessee the following night), and featured the entire SMW roster attacking Jim Cornette, who was then pinned by referee Mark Curtis. Several SMW wrestlers would soon obtain work in the WWF, including Tracy Smothers, The Dirty White Boy, and Boo Bradley. After that, Cornette shut the company down to work full-time with the WWF. WWE now owns the SMW video library.

Both Curtis Comes Home and the 2005 sequel show, held in memory of SMW head referee Mark Curtis are considered "unofficial" reunion shows.

== Major events ==
=== 1992 ===
Date	Event	Venue	Location	Main event
May 22	Volunteer Slam	Civic Coliseum	Knoxville, Tennessee	Brian Lee vs. Paul Orndorff in a tournament final for the inaugural SMW Heavyweight Championship
July 17	Summer Blast	Civic Coliseum	Knoxville, Tennessee	Brian Lee & Ron Garvin vs. Paul Orndorff & The Dirty White Boy
August 8	Fire on the Mountain	Freedom Hall Civic Center	Johnson City, Tennessee	The Heavenly Bodies (Stan Lane and Tom Prichard) (c) vs. The Fantastics (Bobby Fulton and Jackie Fulton) in a Barbed Wire Steel Cage match for the SMW Tag Team Championship
November 26	Thanksgiving Thunder	Memorial Gym	Hazard, Kentucky	The Rock 'n' Roll Express (Ricky Morton and Robert Gibson) (c) vs. The Heavenly Bodies (Stan Lane and Tom Prichard) in a Falls Count Anywhere match for the SMW Tag Team Championship
November 27	Thanksgiving Thunder	National Guard Armory	Welch, West Virginia	The Heavenly Bodies (Stan Lane and Tom Prichard) (c) vs. The Rock 'n' Roll Express (Ricky Morton and Robert Gibson) in a Texas Deathmatch for the SMW Tag Team Championship
November 28	Thanksgiving Thunder	Freedom Hall Civic Center	Johnson City, Tennessee	The Rock 'n' Roll Express (Ricky Morton and Robert Gibson) (c) vs. The Heavenly Bodies (Stan Lane and Tom Prichard) in a street fight for the SMW Tag Team Championship
November 29	Thanksgiving Thunder	Civic Coliseum	Knoxville, Tennessee	The Heavenly Bodies (Stan Lane and Tom Prichard) (c) vs. The Rock 'n' Roll Express (Ricky Morton and Robert Gibson) in a Steel Cage match for the SMW Tag Team Championship
December 25	Christmas Chaos	Civic Coliseum	Knoxville, Tennessee	The Rock 'n' Roll Express (Ricky Morton and Robert Gibson) vs. The Heavenly Bodies (Stan Lane and Tom Prichard) and Jim Cornette
December 26	Christmas Chaos	Freedom Hall Civic Center	Johnson City, Tennessee	The Rock 'n' Roll Express (Ricky Morton and Robert Gibson) vs. The Heavenly Bodies (Stan Lane and Tom Prichard) and Jim Cornette
December 27	Christmas Chaos	Raleigh County Armory	Beckley, West Virginia	The Rock 'n' Roll Express (Ricky Morton and Robert Gibson) vs. The Heavenly Bodies (Stan Lane and Tom Prichard) and Jim Cornette

=== 1993 ===
Date	Event	Venue	Location	Main event
April 2	Bluegrass Brawl	Pikeville College Gymnasium	Pikeville, Kentucky	Bobby Eaton and The Heavenly Bodies (Stan Lane and Tom Prichard) vs. Arn Anderson and The Rock 'n' Roll Express (Ricky Morton and Robert Gibson) vs. Dutch Mantel and The Stud Stable (Robert Fuller and Jimmy Golden)
May 9	Volunteer Slam II: Rage in a Cage	Civic Coliseum	Knoxville, Tennessee	Brian Lee, The Rock 'n' Roll Express (Ricky Morton and Robert Gibson) and The Stud Stable (Robert Fuller and Jimmy Golden) vs. Kevin Sullivan, The Tazmaniac, Killer Kyle and The Heavenly Bodies (Stan Lane and Tom Prichard) in a Rage in a Cage match
May 15	The Last Tango in Tennessee	Freedom Hall Civic Center	Johnson City, Tennessee	The Heavenly Bodies (Stan Lane and Tom Prichard) (c) vs. The Rock 'n' Roll Express (Ricky Morton and Robert Gibson) in a Loser Leaves SMW match for the SMW Tag Team Championship
July 8	Summer Blast	Memorial Gymnasium	Hazard, Kentucky	The Armstrong Family (Bob Armstrong, Scott Armstrong and Steve Armstrong) vs. Jim Cornette and The Heavenly Bodies (Tom Prichard and Jimmy Del Ray)
July 9	Summer Blast	Fleming-Neon High School	Fleming-Neon, Kentucky	The Armstrong Family (Bob Armstrong, Scott Armstrong and Steve Armstrong) vs. Jim Cornette and The Heavenly Bodies (Tom Prichard and Jimmy Del Ray)
July 10	Summer Blast	Raleigh County Armory	Beckley, West Virginia	The Armstrong Family (Bob Armstrong, Scott Armstrong and Steve Armstrong) vs. Jim Cornette and The Heavenly Bodies (Tom Prichard and Jimmy Del Ray)
July 15	Summer Blast	Evarts High School	Evarts, Kentucky	The Armstrong Family (Bob Armstrong, Scott Armstrong and Steve Armstrong) vs. Jim Cornette and The Heavenly Bodies (Tom Prichard and Jimmy Del Ray)
July 16	Summer Blast	Civic Coliseum	Knoxville, Tennessee	The Armstrong Family (Bob Armstrong, Scott Armstrong and Steve Armstrong) vs. Jim Cornette and The Heavenly Bodies (Tom Prichard and Jimmy Del Ray)
July 17	Summer Blast	Freedom Hall Civic Center	Johnson City, Tennessee	The Armstrong Family (Bob Armstrong, Scott Armstrong and Steve Armstrong) vs. Jim Cornette and The Heavenly Bodies (Tom Prichard and Jimmy Del Ray)
August 13	Hot August Night in Mo-Town	East High School Gymnasium	Morristown, Tennessee	The Armstrong Family (Bob Armstrong, Scott Armstrong and Steve Armstrong) vs. Jim Cornette and The Heavenly Bodies (Tom Prichard and Jimmy Del Ray)
August 14	Fire on the Mountain	Freedom Hall Civic Center	Johnson City, Tennessee	The Armstrong Family (Bob Armstrong, Scot Armstrong and Steve Armstrong) and The Rock 'n' Roll Express (Ricky Morton and Robert Gibson) vs. Jim Cornette, The Bruise Brothers (Ron Bruise and Don Bruise) and The Heavenly Bodies (Tom Prichard and Jimmy Del Ray) in a Rage in a Cage match with the Big Boss Man as special guest referee
August 20	K-Town Showdown	Civic Coliseum	Knoxville, Tennessee	Bob Armstrong vs. Jim Cornette in a Lumberjacks with Tennis Rackets match with the Big Boss Man as special guest referee
October 1	Big Apple Grapple	Paintsville High School Gymnasium	Paintsville, Kentucky	13-man Battle Royal
October 7	Parade of Champions	Memorial Gymnasium	Hazard, Kentucky	The Heavenly Bodies (Tom Prichard and Jimmy Del Ray) vs. The Steiner Brothers (Rick Steiner and Scott Steiner)
October 8	Parade of Champions	Civic Coliseum	Knoxville, Tennessee	The Heavenly Bodies (Tom Prichard and Jimmy Del Ray) vs. The Steiner Brothers (Rick Steiner and Scott Steiner)
October 9	Parade of Champions	Knox County High School	Barbourville, Kentucky	The Heavenly Bodies (Tom Prichard and Jimmy Del Ray) vs. The Steiner Brothers (Rick Steiner and Scott Steiner)
October 10	Parade of Champions	Freedom Hall Civic Center	Johnson City, Tennessee	The Heavenly Bodies (Tom Prichard and Jimmy Del Ray) vs. The Steiner Brothers (Rick Steiner and Scott Steiner)
November 25	Thanksgiving Thunder	Memorial Gymnasium	Hazard, Kentucky	The Bruise Brothers (Ron Bruise and Don Bruise) vs. The Heavenly Bodies (Tom Prichard and Jimmy Del Ray) in a street fight
November 26	Thanksgiving Thunder	Civic Coliseum	Knoxville, Tennessee	The Bruise Brothers (Ron Bruise and Don Bruise) vs. The Heavenly Bodies (Tom Prichard and Jimmy Del Ray) in a street fight
November 27	Thanksgiving Thunder	Knox Central High School Gymnasium	Barbourville, Kentucky	The Bruise Brothers (Ron Bruise and Don Bruise) vs. The Heavenly Bodies (Tom Prichard and Jimmy Del Ray) in a street fight
November 28	Thanksgiving Thunder	Freedom Hall Civic Center	Johnson City, Tennessee	The Bruise Brothers (Ron Bruise and Don Bruise) vs. The Heavenly Bodies (Tom Prichard and Jimmy Del Ray) in a street fight
December 25	Christmas Chaos	Civic Coliseum	Knoxville, Tennessee	Brian Lee (c) vs. Tracy Smothers vs. The Dirty White Boy for the SMW Heavyweight Championship
December 26	Christmas Chaos	Freedom Hall Civic Center	Johnson City, Tennessee	Brian Lee (c) vs. Tracy Smothers vs. The Dirty White Boy for the SMW Heavyweight Championship
December 27	Christmas Chaos	Knox Central High School Gymnasium	Barbourville, Kentucky	Brian Lee (c) vs. Tracy Smothers vs. The Dirty White Boy for the SMW Heavyweight Championship

=== 1994 ===
Date	Event	Venue	Location	Main event
February 13	Sunday Bloody Sunday	Civic Coliseum	Knoxville, Tennessee	The Bruise Brothers (Don Bruise and Ron Bruise) vs. The Moondogs (Moondog Spot and Moondog Rex) in a Steel Cage match
March 10	Golden Week	Cobb County Civic Center	Marietta, Georgia	Bob Armstrong vs. Jim Cornette in a Steel Cage match
March 11	Golden Week	Johnson Central High School	Paintsville, Kentucky	The Dirty White Boy and The Dirty White Girl vs. Brian Lee and Tammy Fytch
March 12	Golden Week	Freedom Hall Civic Center	Johnson City, Tennessee	The Heavenly Bodies (Tom Prichard and Jimmy Del Ray) (c) vs. The Rock 'n' Roll Express (Ricky Morton and Robert Gibson) in a 60-minute iron man match for the SMW Tag Team Championship
March 13	Golden Week	Civic Coliseum	Knoxville, Tennessee	The Heavenly Bodies (Tom Prichard and Jimmy Del Ray) (c) vs. The Rock 'n' Roll Express (Ricky Morton and Robert Gibson) in a 60-minute iron man match for the SMW Tag Team Championship
March 15	Golden Week	Clinton County High School	Albany, Kentucky	The Heavenly Bodies (Tom Prichard and Jimmy Del Ray) (c) vs. The Rock 'n' Roll Express (Ricky Morton and Robert Gibson) for the SMW Tag Team Championship
March 17	Golden Week	Nixon Center	Hyden, Kentucky	The Heavenly Bodies (Tom Prichard and Jimmy Del Ray) (c) vs. The Rock 'n' Roll Express (Ricky Morton and Robert Gibson) for the SMW Tag Team Championship
March 18	Golden Week	Knox County High School	Barbourville, Kentucky	The Heavenly Bodies (Tom Prichard and Jimmy Del Ray) (c) vs. Tim Horner and Robert Gibson in a 60-minute iron man match for the SMW Tag Team Championship
March 19	Golden Week	Cawood High School Gymnasium	Harlan, Kentucky	The Heavenly Bodies (Tom Prichard and Jimmy Del Ray) (c) vs. Tracy Smothers and Robert Gibson for the SMW Tag Team Championship
April 1	Bluegrass Brawl II: The Famous Final Scene	Pikeville College Gymnasium	Pikeville, Kentucky	The Heavenly Bodies (Tom Prichard and Jimmy Del Ray) (c) vs. The Rock 'n' Roll Express (Ricky Morton and Robert Gibson) in a Loser Leaves Town Steel Cage match for the SMW Tag Team Championship
May 20	Volunteer Slam III	Civic Coliseum	Knoxville, Tennessee	Jake Roberts (c) vs. The Dirty White Boy for the SMW Heavyweight Championship
July 1	Summer Blast	Civic Coliseum	Knoxville, Tennessee	The Dirty White Boy vs. Bruiser Bedlam in a Steel Cage match
July 2	Summer Blast	Knox County High School	Barbourville, Kentucky	The Dirty White Boy vs. Jim Cornette in a Steel Cage match
July 3	Summer Blast	Cobb County Civic Center	Marietta, Georgia	The Dirty White Boy vs. Bruiser Bedlam in a steel cage
July 4	Summer Blast	Paintsville High School Gymnasium	Paintsville, Kentucky	Bambi and The Rock 'n' Roll Express (Ricky Morton and Robert Gibson) vs. Tammy Fytch, Chris Candido and Brian Lee
July 7	Summer Blast	Cawood High School	Harlan, Kentucky	Tracy Smothers vs. Bruiser Bedlam in a street fight
July 8	Summer Blast	Raleigh County Armory	Beckley, West Virginia	Tracy Smothers vs. Bruiser Bedlam in a street fight
July 9	Summer Blast	Freedom Hall Civic Center	Johnson City, Tennessee	The Dirty White Boy vs. Chris Candido in a Steel Cage match for the SMW Heavyweight Championship
August 5	The Night of the Legends	Civic Coliseum	Knoxville, Tennessee	Bob Armstrong, Tracy Smothers and Road Warrior Hawk vs. Bruiser Bedlam and The Funk Brothers (Dory Funk Jr. and Terry Funk) in a "Coward Waves the Flag" match
August 6	Fire on the Mountain	Freedom Hall Civic Center	Johnson City, Tennessee	Bob Armstrong, Tracy Smothers and Road Warrior Hawk vs. Bruiser Bedlam and The Funk Brothers (Dory Funk Jr. and Terry Funk) in a Texas Deathmatch
September 30	Big Apple Grapple	Paintsville High School Gymnasium	Paintsville, Kentucky	The Dirty White Boy, Tracy Smothers and The Rock 'n' Roll Express (Ricky Morton and Robert Gibson) vs. Boo Bradley, Bruiser Bedlam and The Gangstas (New Jack and Mustafa)
November 17	SMW/NWA Championship Wrestling America (NWA World Heavyweight Championship tournament)	Stanton Hall	Philadelphia, Pennsylvania	The Gangstas (New Jack and Mustafa) vs. The Rock 'n' Roll Express (Ricky Morton and Robert Gibson) for the SMW Tag Team Championship
November 18	SMW/NWA Championship Wrestling America (NWA World Heavyweight Championship tournament)	Pleasantville High School	Pleasantville, New Jersey	The Gangstas (New Jack and Mustafa) vs. The Rock 'n' Roll Express (Ricky Morton and Robert Gibson) for the SMW Tag Team Championship
November 19	SMW/NWA Championship Wrestling America (NWA World Heavyweight Championship tournament)	National Guard Armory	Cherry Hill, New Jersey	Chris Candido vs. Tracy Smothers in a tournament final for the vacant NWA World Heavyweight Championship
November 24	Thanksgiving Thunder	Civic Coliseum	Knoxville, Tennessee	The Gangstas (New Jack and Mustafa) vs. The Rock 'n' Roll Express (Ricky Morton and Robert Gibson) in a Ghetto Street Fight for the SMW Tag Team Championship
November 25	Thanksgiving Thunder	Paintsville High School Gymnasium	Paintsville, Kentucky	The Gangstas (New Jack and Mustafa) vs. The Rock 'n' Roll Express (Ricky Morton and Robert Gibson) in a Ghetto Street Fight for the SMW Tag Team Championship
November 26	Thanksgiving Thunder	Freedom Hall Civic Center	Johnson City, Tennessee	The Gangstas (New Jack and Mustafa) vs. The Rock 'n' Roll Express (Ricky Morton and Robert Gibson) in a Ghetto Street Fight for the SMW Tag Team Championship
November 27	Thanksgiving Thunder	Cobb County Civic Center	Marietta, Georgia	The Gangstas (New Jack and Mustafa) vs. The Rock 'n' Roll Express (Ricky Morton and Robert Gibson) in a Ghetto Street Fight for the SMW Tag Team Championship
December 25	Christmas Chaos	Civic Coliseum	Knoxville, Tennessee	The Gangstas (New Jack and Mustafa) vs. The Rock 'n' Roll Express (Ricky Morton and Robert Gibson) for the SMW Tag Team Championship
December 26	Christmas Chaos	Freedom Hall Civic Center	Johnson City, Tennessee	The Rock 'n' Roll Express (Ricky Morton and Robert Gibson) (c) vs. The Gangstas (New Jack and Mustafa) for the SMW Tag Team Championship
December 27	Christmas Chaos	Mulberry Street Recreation Center	Lenoir, North Carolina	The Rock 'n' Roll Express (Ricky Morton and Robert Gibson) (c) vs. The Gangstas (New Jack and Mustafa) for the SMW Tag Team Championship
December 29	Christmas Chaos	Peel's Palace	Erlanger, Kentucky	Battle Royal
December 30	Christmas Chaos	National Guard Armory	Ashland, Kentucky	Bobby Blaze and The Rock 'n' Roll Express (Ricky Morton and Robert Gibson) vs. D-Lo Brown and The Gangstas (New Jack and Mustafa)

=== 1995 ===
Date	Event	Venue	Location	Main event
January 28	Super Saturday Night Fever	Civic Coliseum	Knoxville, Tennessee	16-man K-Town Rumble match
February 25	Brawl in the Hall	Freedom Hall Civic Center	Johnson City, Tennessee	The Heavenly Bodies (Tom Prichard and Jimmy Del Ray) vs. The Gangstas (New Jack and Mustafa) in a street fight
February 26	Sunday Bloody Sunday II	Civic Coliseum	Knoxville, Tennessee	Jim Cornette and The Heavenly Bodies (Tom Prichard and Jimmy Del Ray) vs. D-Lo Brown and The Gangstas (New Jack and Mustafa) with Bob Armstrong as special guest referee
March 18	March Madness	Freedom Hall Civic Center	Johnson City, Tennessee	The Dirty White Boy vs. Buddy Landel in a Steel Cage match
March 19	March Madness	Civic Coliseum	Knoxville, Tennessee	The Dirty White Boy vs. Buddy Landel in a Steel Cage match
April 7	Bluegrass Brawl III	Pikeville College Gymnasium	Pikeville, Kentucky	Tracy Smothers and The Undertaker vs. D-Lo Brown and The Gangstas (New Jack and Mustafa) in a Loser Salutes the Flag match
April 8	Fright Night	Freedom Hall Civic Center	Johnson City, Tennessee	Bob Armstrong, Tracy Smothers and The Undertaker vs. D-Lo Brown and The Gangstas (New Jack and Mustafa) in an "I quit" match
May 19	Volunteer Slam IV	Civic Coliseum	Knoxville, Tennessee	Ricky Morton vs. Al Snow in a scaffold match
May 20	Charlotte Memories	Grady Cole Center	Charlotte, North Carolina	The Dynamic Duo (Al Snow and Unabomb) vs. The Rock 'n' Roll Express (Ricky Morton and Robert Gibson)
July 15	Summer Blast	Civic Coliseum	Knoxville, Tennessee	The Dynamic Duo (Al Snow and Unabomb) vs. The Rock 'n' Roll Express (Ricky Morton and Robert Gibson) in a street fight
August 4	Super Bowl of Wrestling	Civic Coliseum	Knoxville, Tennessee	Shawn Michaels (c) vs. Buddy Landel for the WWF Intercontinental Championship
August 12	Fire on the Mountain: Night of the Dream Matches	Freedom Hall Civic Center	Johnson City, Tennessee	The Heavenly Bodies (Tom Prichard and Jimmy Del Ray) (c) vs. The Thugs (The Dirty White Boy and Tracy Smothers) for the SMW Tag Team Championship
August 13	Carolina Cup	Grady Cole Center	Charlotte, North Carolina	The Heavenly Bodies (Tom Prichard and Jimmy Del Ray) vs. The Thugs (The Dirty White Boy and Tracy Smothers) in the Carolina Cup Tag Team Tournament Finals
October 20	Halloween Scream	Civic Coliseum	Knoxville, Tennessee	Tommy Rich vs. Buddy Landel in a chain match
October 21	Halloween Scream	East High School Gymnasium	Morristown, Tennessee	Tommy Rich vs. Buddy Landel in a Falls Count Anywhere match
October 27	Halloween Scream	Cookeville Community Center	Cookeville, Tennessee	Tommy Rich vs. Buddy Landel in a First Blood match
October 28	Halloween Scream	Freedom Hall Civic Center	Johnson City, Tennessee	Tommy Rich vs. Buddy Landel in a barbed wire match
November 23	Thanksgiving Thunder	Civic Coliseum	Knoxville, Tennessee	Robert Gibson and The Heavenly Bodies (Tom Prichard and Jimmy Del Ray) vs. The Thugs (The Dirty White Boy and Tracy Smothers) and a mystery partner
November 24	Thanksgiving Thunder	Knox Central High School Gymnasium	Barbourville, Kentucky	Robert Gibson and The Heavenly Bodies (Tom Prichard and Jimmy Del Ray) vs. Ricky Morton and The Thugs (The Dirty White Boy and Tracy Smothers)
November 25	Thanksgiving Thunder	Freedom Hall Civic Center	Johnson City, Tennessee	Robert Gibson and The Heavenly Bodies (Tom Prichard and Jimmy Del Ray) vs. Ricky Morton and The Thugs (The Dirty White Boy and Tracy Smothers)
November 26	Thanksgiving Thunder	Cookeville Community Center	Cookeville, Tennessee	Jim Cornette vs. Mark Curtis

== Tournaments ==
Smoky Mountain Wrestling held a variety of professional wrestling tournaments between 1992 and 1995 that were competed for by wrestlers that were a part of their roster.

=== SMW Tag Team Championship Tournament ===
The SMW Tag Team Championship Tournament was a tournament to crown the first-ever SMW Tag Team Champions. It was held between March 12 and April 23, 1992; the finals of the tournament was originally scheduled for Volunteer Slam on May 22 in Knoxville, but the teams that made the finals, The Fantastics and The Heavenly Bodies, decided to have the tournament final on the April 23, 1992 TV taping, which aired on May 9.

Quarterfinals
The Heavenly Bodies (Stan Lane and Tom Prichard)	Pin
The Batten Twins (Bart Batten and Brad Batten)	06:15
Joey Maggs and Danny Davis	Pin
The Koloffs (Ivan Koloff and Vladimir Koloff)	07:21
The Maulers (Rip Morgan and Jack Victory)	Pin
Johnny Rich and Davey Rich	10:31
The Wild Bunch (Joel Deaton and Billy Black)	Pin
The Fantastics (Bobby Fulton and Jackie Fulton)	11:52

Semifinals
The Heavenly Bodies	Pin
Joey Maggs and Danny Davis	08:37
The Maulers	Pin
The Fantastics	08:37

Final
The Heavenly Bodies	Pin
The Fantastics	09:55

=== King of Kentucky Tournament ===
The King of Kentucky Tournament was a one-night single elimination tournament held in Hazard, Kentucky on June 24, 1993.

Quarterfinals
Bobby Blaze	DQ
Killer Kyle
Brian Lee
Jimmy Golden
The Dirty White Boy
Tim Horner
Chris Candido	Pin
Tracy Smothers

Semifinals
Bobby Blaze
Brian Lee
The Dirty White Boy
Tracy Smothers

Final
Brian Lee	Pin
Tracy Smothers

=== NWA World Heavyweight Championship Tournament (1994) ===
The NWA World Heavyweight Championship Tournament was a one-night single elimination tournament held in Cherry Hill, New Jersey on November 19, 1994, to decide a new NWA World Heavyweight Champion. The previous champion Shane Douglas had infamously "threw down" the NWA title in favor of the ECW World Heavyweight Championship after defeating 2 Cold Scorpio at the NWA World Title Tournament three months earlier.

Qualifiers
Tracy Smothers	Pin
Devon Storm
Eddie Gilbert	Pin
Johnny Gunn
Chris Candido	Pin
Al Snow
The Dirty White Boy	DQ
Jerry Lawler
Osamu Nishimura	Draw
Lou Perez
BYE
BYE
BYE
BYE
BYE
BYE

Quarterfinals
Tracy Smothers	Pin
Eddie Gilbert
Chris Candido	Pin
The Dirty White Boy
BYE
BYE
BYE
BYE

Semi-finals
BYE
BYE
BYE
BYE

Finals
Tracy Smothers	Pin
Chris Candido

=== Carolina Cup Tag Team Tournament ===
The Carolina Cup Tag Team Tournament was a one-night single elimination tournament held at the Grady Cole Center on August 13, 1995.

QuarterfinalsTaped March 12
The Heavenly Bodies (Tom Prichard and Jimmy Del Ray)	Pin
Bobby Fulton and Boo Bradley
BYE
BYE
The Thugs (The Dirty White Boy and Tracy Smothers)	Pin
Tommy Rich and The Punisher
The Headbangers (Mosh and Thrasher)	Pin
Robert Gibson and Curtis Thompson

Semifinals
The Heavenly Bodies
BYE
The Thugs
The Headbangers	Pin

Final
The Heavenly Bodies	Pin
The Thugs

== Final champions ==
Championship	Last Recognized Champion	From	Until	Notes
SMW Heavyweight Championship	Jerry Lawler	May 22, 1992	December 30, 1995	
SMW "Beat The Champ" Television Championship	Bobby Blaze	December 12, 1992	1995	
SMW Tag Team Championship	The Heavenly Bodies (Tom Prichard and Jimmy Del Ray)	April 23, 1992	November 26, 1995	
SMW United States Junior Heavyweight Championship	Bobby Blaze	September 13, 1993	July 29, 1994	

† After SMW closed, Brad Armstrong declared himself SMW champion and defended the SMW Heavyweight Championship in the United States Wrestling Association. He eventually lost the belt to Jerry Lawler on December 30, 1995.

== See also ==
- List of independent wrestling promotions in the United States
