= Heavenly Bodies (professional wrestling) =

Professional wrestling tag team

Tag team
- Members: Justin Corino; Dustin Corino
- Former members: Al Greene; Don Greene; Tom Prichard; Pat Rose; Stan Lane; Jimmy Del Ray; Bobby Eaton; Vito DeNucci; Chris Nelson; Eddie Golden; K. C. Thunder
- Years active: 1955–1973, 1992–2008, 2015–present

The Heavenly Bodies is a professional wrestling tag team famous for having worked in Smoky Mountain Wrestling, the World Wrestling Federation, and various independent promotions.

The original team wrestled in the Tennessee area and consisted of Al Greene (real name Al Denney) and Don Greene. They were 7 time NWA Southern Tag Team Champions and wrestled as a tag team from October 6, 1955 to June 28, 1973.

Over the years, there have been multiple variations of the team, which has at different times included "Doctor" Tom Prichard, "Sweet" Stan Lane, "Beautiful" Bobby Eaton, and "Gigolo" Jimmy Del Ray, and was led by heel manager James E. Cornette.

== History ==
=== Al and Don Greene ===
The Heavenly Bodies was a tag team composed of Al and Don Greene. One of their matches was on October 6, 1969 in Memphis, Tennessee against Southern Tag Team Champions Dennis Hall and Johnny Walker with their titles on the line. The veteran tag team picked up the win, capturing the NWA Southern Tag Team Championship for the first time. They started feuding with Dennis Hall and Johnny Walker who were unable to regain the titles. Dennis and his new partner, the legendary Jackie Fargo, however, were able to beat the new champions for the titles only two weeks later. The first reign of Heavenly Bodies was short-lived as it lasted only two weeks. They won the titles for the second time on November 3, by beating Fargo and Hall for the titles. A week later, on November 10, they lost the titles to Bearcat Brown and Les Thatcher before regaining the titles a week later, on November 17. Their third reign was better and longer than their previous two reigns which lasted almost a month as they lost the titles to Dennis Hall and Johnny Long on December 15. On December 23, they defeated Hall and Walker in another longer reign where they lost the titles back to Dennis Hall and Johnny Walker on January 19, 1970 in a match in which Don was injured and sidelined.

Al formed a tag team with Frank Martinez and held the Southern Tag Team Championships three times. Don returned from injury in late 1970 and reunited with Al as Heavenly Bodies. In December, they beat Jerry Jarrett and Tojo Yamamoto for the titles before losing them back to Jarrett and Yamamoto on January 9, 1971. They won the titles a sixth time in 1971 when they defeated longtime rivals Dennis Hall and Johnny Walker. On May 31, they lost the titles to another longtime rivals Jarrett and Yamamoto before taking the titles back from them a final time on June 21. A week later, on June 28, their final reign ended when they were beaten by Jerry Jarrett and Jackie Fargo for the titles. Al and Don stopped teaming together, disbanding Heavenly Bodies.

=== Greene and Lawler ===
After the Greene Brothers disbanded, Don Greene teamed up with upcoming star Jerry Lawler as the Heavenly Bodies throughout the Georgia territory. The team was short-lived, as Lawler would begin to focus on his singles career.

=== Prichard and Rose ===
In 1985, Tom Prichard and Pat Rose briefly used the name the Heavenly Bodies while working in the Memphis territory. The team was managed by Sherri Martel.

=== Prichard and Lane ===
In 1992, Prichard reformed the Heavenly Bodies in Smoky Mountain Wrestling (SMW) with Stan Lane. Managed by Jim Cornette, Prichard and Lane became the first SMW Tag Team Champions. Following his departure from World Championship Wrestling (WCW), Bobby Eaton was added to the team. Manager Jim Cornette explained that any two of the three men could defend the belts at any given time, as he had registered the Heavenly Bodies with SMW as a 'corporation'.

During their tenure in SMW, the Heavenly Bodies had long running feuds with the likes of The New Fantastics (Bobby Fulton and Jackie Fulton) and the Rock 'n' Roll Express (Ricky Morton and Robert Gibson). Their feuds were often highlighted with hardcore matches and numerous title changes. An agreement between SMW and WCW allowed the bodies to face the Rock 'n' Roll Express at the SuperBrawl III pay-per-view on February 21, 1993. The Heavenly Bodies lost this match. For a brief time in 1993, Eaton held Smoky Mountain's television championship (the promotion's secondary title) while the Heavenly Bodies were the tag team champions.

=== Prichard and Del Ray ===
In May 1993, Lane left the team after losing a loser-of-the-fall leaves town match. The team continued with Lane replaced by Pritchard's "cousin" "Gigolo" Jimmy Del Ray. Over the next few years, the new duo competed not only in SMW but also in the World Wrestling Federation (WWF), Extreme Championship Wrestling (ECW), and the United States Wrestling Association (USWA). They continued their feud with The Rock 'n' Roll Express in these promotions and began new rivalries with the Steiner Brothers (Rick and Scott Steiner), and the Smoking Gunns (Bart and Billy Gunn).

In July 1993, SMW's working agreement with the WWF allowed the Heavenly Bodies and The Rock 'n' Roll Express to wrestle on the organization's pay-per-view shows. Prichard and Del Ray unsuccessfully challenged for the WWF Tag Team Championship at SummerSlam 1993 but captured the SMW Tag Team Championship against The Rock 'n' Roll Express three months later at Survivor Series 1993.

During their time in the WWF, they wrestled a tour for All Japan Pro Wrestling in May 1994, and returned to SMW in the summer of 1994 to feud with teams like The Rock 'n' Roll Express, The Thrillseekers (Chris Jericho and Lance Storm) and The Gangstas (New Jack and Mustafa Saed).

In 1995, The Bodies defeated PG-13 (J. C. Ice and Wolfie D) to capture the USWA World Tag Team Championship. Later in the year, Prichard and Del Ray also competed in ECW, aligning themselves with Raven (see Raven's Nest) to face off against The Public Enemy (Rocco Rock and Johnny Grunge). Following the November 1995 closure of SMW, the Heavenly Bodies disbanded. Their last match as a team occurred in ECW on December 9, 1995, losing to The Public Enemy. Prichard joined the WWF as Zip of the Bodydonnas while Del Ray competed on the independent circuit and in WCW as "Jimmy Graffti".

Del Ray died of a heart attack on December 6, 2014.

=== DeNucci and Nelson ===
A new Heavenly Bodies team began to compete on the independent circuit around 2000. The New Heavenly Bodies, comprising "Vivacious" Vito DeNucci and "Casanova" Chris Nelson captured the NWA World Tag Team Championship three times, and on occasion, "Gigolo" Jimmy Del Ray served as their manager. DeNucci and Nelson were previously the longest reigning NWA World Tag Team champions, but have since been surpassed by America's Most Wanted. The duo occasionally appear on various independent wrestling shows. The team also wrestled in IPW as Drunk and Disorderly; as well as holding the NWA World Tag Team Championships three times, they have also held the IPW Tag Team Championships among others.

On April 3, 2010 the New Heavenly Bodies defeated the Dark City Fight Club (Jon Davis and Kory Chavis) to win the NWA Florida Tag Team Championship. On April 16 DeNucci and Nelson lost the titles back to the Dark City Fight Club.

=== Golden and Thunder ===
Eddie Golden and K. C. Thunder, former rivals in Southern States Wrestling, teamed together as the Heavenly Bodies throughout the Southeastern United States during 2008. They were occasionally accompanied by their valet Dawn Renea. Although short-lived compared to the prior incarnations, they won the tag team titles in the New Frontier Wrestling Association and challenged the tag champions in NWA All-Star Wrestling. In one of their last matches together, they wrestled Iron Cross and Stan Lee in a Texas Tornado death match at a middle school fundraiser in Lebanon, Virginia. According to the pre-match stipulation, the Heavenly Bodies' valet Dawn Renae would have her head shaved if the team failed to win the belts.

=== Dustin and Justin Corino ===
In 2015, "Desirable Dustin" and "Gigolo Justin" began teaming as the Heavenly Bodies in the Global Force Wrestling promotion. They also wrestled for New Jersey–based promotion, PWS (Pro Wrestling Syndicate), during which time they received permission from Tom Prichard to use the name the Heavenly Bodies. The PWS owners parted ways and Pat Buck, former co-owner of PWS, started WrestlePro. The Heavenly Bodies won the WrestlePro Tag Team titles on January 7, 2016.

== Championship and Accomplishments ==
- Al and Don Greene
  - National Wrestling Alliance
    - NWA Southern Tag Team Championship (7 times)
- Lane and Prichard
  - Pro Wrestling Illustrated
    - PWI ranked them # 73 of the 100 best tag teams of the PWI Years in 2003.
  - Smoky Mountain Wrestling
    - SMW Tag Team Championship (5 times)
- Prichard and Del Ray
  - Pro Wrestling Illustrated
    - PWI ranked them # 73 of the 100 best tag teams of the PWI Years in 2003.
  - Pennsylvania Championship Wrestling
    - PCW Tag Team Championship (1 time)
  - Smoky Mountain Wrestling
    - SMW Tag Team Championship (3 times)
  - United States Wrestling Association
    - USWA World Tag Team Championship (1 time)
- DeNucci and Nelson
  - Coastal Championship Wrestling
    - CCW Tag Team Championship (1 time)
  - National Wrestling Alliance
    - NWA World Tag Team Championship (3 times)
  - Pro Wrestling Fusion
    - NWA Florida Tag Team Championship (1 time)
  - Southern Championship Wrestling
    - SCW Tag Team Championship (1 time)
  - Pro Wrestling Syndicate
    - PWS Tag Team Championship (1 time)
  - WrestlePro
    - WrestlePro Tag Team Championship (1 time)
- Golden and Thunder
  - New Frontier Wrestling Association
    - NFWA Tag Team Championship (1 time)
- Dustin and Justin Corino
  - WrestlePro
    - WrestlePro Tag Team Championship (2 times)
