= Fantastics =

Professional wrestling tag team

The Fantastics

Tag team
- Name(s): The Fantastics; The Fantastic Ones
- Members: Bobby Fulton; Tommy Rogers
- Billed heights: 5 ft 10 in (1.78 m) – Bobby; 5 ft 9 in (1.75 m) – Tommy
- Combined billed weight: 442 lb (200 kg)
- Hometown: Los Angeles, California
- Billed from: Los Angeles, California
- Former members: Jackie Fulton
- Debut: 1984
- Disbanded: 2005

The Fantastics were a professional wrestling tag team composed of Bobby Fulton and Tommy Rogers who worked together extensively between 1984 and 2007. At times, Bobby Fulton would team up with his brother Jackie Fulton under the same name.

== Team history ==
=== Mid South Wrestling (1984) ===
While in the Mid-Southern area (Memphis), Terry Taylor was teamed with a budding young wrestler named Bobby Fulton, who at the time was a jobber on TV but showed promise. To capitalize further on the success of The Fabulous Ones, they were named "The Fantastic Ones" and teamed only for a brief time before splitting up. In 1984, Bobby Fulton moved to the Mid-South area and teamed with Tommy Rogers shortening the name of the team to "The Fantastics". Their first match came on June 20, 1984, at a Mid-South TV taping in Shreveport, LA, where the duo defeated Barry Orton and Pat Rose.

After defeating preliminary competition on television, The Fantastics earned their first significant victory when they defeated Hercules Hernandez and Krusher Khruschev on July 15, 1984, in Tulsa, OK. They then began a feud with The Midnight Express (Bobby Eaton and Dennis Condrey) that would extend into the National Wrestling Alliance (NWA).

=== World Class Championship Wrestling (1984–1985) ===
In October 1984 the Fantastics joined the Von Erich's popular Texas based promotion, carrying over their feud with the Midnight Express. The Fantastics defeated the Midnights in their debut match with the promotion at a house show in San Antonio, TX on October 20, and a day later in Fort Worth they beat The Long Riders (Bill Irwin & Scott Irwin) to capture the NWA American Tag Team Championship. They would continue the Midnight Express feud over the World Class Wrestling Association's WCWA Tag Team Championship. The Fantastics hired a bodyguard, Silo Sam who stood at 7 feet 7 inches. As champions they would successfully defend against numerous duos, including Pretty Young Things (Koko B Ware & Norvell Austin) and Jake Roberts & Kelly Kiniski.

On January 11, 1985, the Midnight Express defeated the Fantastics to gain the NWA American Tag-Team Championship, re-igniting their feud. At WCCW house shows that winter the two teams would face off in numerous matches, with the Fantastics usually winning that spring after Eaton & Condrey vacated the titles. Rogers and Fulton would face off against the Express for the vacant championship at the 2nd Von Erich Memorial Parade Of Champions on May 5, 1985, and regained the titles. The Fantastics second reign lasted until June 24, when they were defeated by the Dynamic Duo (Chris Adams and Gino Hernandez).

=== Mid-South Wrestling (1985) ===
Almost immediately after their loss to Adams and Hernandez the Fantastics returned to Mid-South Wrestling. They made their return on June 30, 1985, in Tulsa, OK, defeating The Midnight Express once more. That fall they moved on to a feud with Dutch Mantell & Bill Dundee. On September 25 they defeated Mantell & Dundee on television in a "bullwhip on a pole" match.

=== Continental Wrestling Association (1985–1986) ===
In November 1985 the Fantastics joined the Continental Wrestling Association, making their debut at a house show in Lexington, KY on the 15th of that month in a successful effort versus Pat Rose & Tom Prichard. As the winter progressed they would face off against Rip Morgan & Taras Bulba, as well as The Freedom Fighters (the rookie Jim Hellwig and Steve Borden). On January 13, 1986, in Memphis, TN the Fantastics defeated The Sheepherders to win the vacant AWA Southern Tag Team Championship. Less than two weeks later Rogers and Fulton beat The Sheepherders in a loser-leaves-town match, sending their new nemesis departing from the CWA. However the Fantastics stint in the CWA would be relatively short, as they lost the titles to The MOD Squad on March 24, 1986 and departed for the UWF.

=== Universal Wrestling Federation (1986) ===
The Fantastics thus jumped to the Universal Wrestling Federation (UWF), making their debut on March 30, 1986, at a UWF TV Taping where they defeated The Sheepherders to win the UWF Tag Team Championship. While continuing to defend their championship the duo participated in the NWA Jim Crockett Sr. Memorial Cup 1986. On April 19 the team defeated The Fabulous Ones in the first round of the tournament in a matinee event held at the Super Dome in New Orleans, Louisiana. Later that evening a second card was held, and the second round of the tournament began. Fulton and Rogers defeated the tandem of NWA National Heavyweight Champion Tully Blanchard & NWA Television Champion Arn Anderson. In the quarterfinals the Fantastics faced off against their UWF opponents The Sheepherders; both were placed out of the tournament after battling to a double disqualification.

After successfully retaining against The Sheepherders in numerous rematches throughout the spring of 1986, the Fantastics lost the UWF Tag-Team Championship to Hot Stuff & Hyatt International (Eddie Gilbert & Sting) at a television taping on July 20. The two teams would trade the titles back and forth during the summer of 1986. This feud would continue through the remainder of the year and into 1987.

=== World Class Championship Wrestling (1987–1988) ===
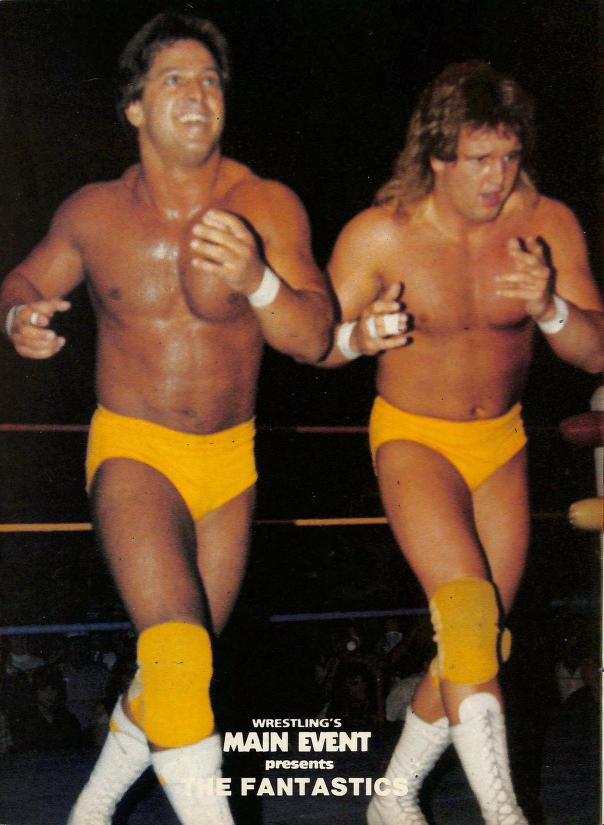
Fantastics, circa 1987

In February 1987, the duo returned to World Class Championship Wrestling. They hired a 7"5 bodyguard Silo Sam. Early in their tenure they captured the World Class Tag Team Championship by defeating Al Madril & Brian Adias at a house show in Lubbock, TX on March 4. During the WCCW run they feuded with Mike Davis and Tommy Lane, The Rock 'n' Roll RPMs. The Fantastics won the feud by winning a scaffold match at the Parade of Champions 4 on May 3, 1987. On June 26, 1987, they lost the titles to Eric Embry & Frankie Lancaster, and would later feud with Jack Victory & John Tatum.

=== National Wrestling Alliance (1988–1989) ===
On March 12, 1988, the Fantastics made their debut on NWA Pro television for the NWA's Jim Crockett Promotions, defeating the latest version of The Midnight Express (Bobby Eaton & Stan Lane). The latter were the NWA United States Tag Team Title at the time, and the Fantastics won in their non-title debut. On March 27, 1988, the duo again faced the Midnights at the inaugural Clash of Champions, this time falling in defeat. The next month they participated in the NWA Jim Crockett Sr. Memorial Cup 1988, earning a first round bye and defeating Al Perez & NWA Western States Heritage Champion Larry Zbyszko. On April 23, 1988, in the quarterfinals in Greensboro, NC they defeated Rick Steiner & NWA Television Champion Mike Rotunda, but were eliminated in the semifinals by NWA World Tag Team Champions Arn Anderson & Tully Blanchard. On April 26, 1988, the Fantastics won the United States Tag-Team Championship from the Midnight Express in a 40-minute match held at an NWA television taping in Chattanooga, TN. Their feud would continue throughout the spring, with the Express regaining the titles on July 10 in Baltimore, MD at The Great American Bash 1988 - "The Price For Freedom" PPV. The Midnights later vacated the titles after winning the NWA World Tag-Team Championship from Anderson & Blanchard, and as their feud with the Fantastics continued it would now be for the NWA's ultimate prize. Meanwhile, Rogers & Fulton competed in a tournament for the vacant United States championship and would win them back at Clash of the Champions IV "Seasons Beatings" on December 7, 1988, in Chattanooga, TN when they defeated Ron Simmons & Eddie Gilbert. Their second title reign was short, as they were beaten for the belts by The Varsity Club (Kevin Sullivan & Steve Williams) at Starrcade 88.

As 1989 began the Fantastics were programmed into a house show series with the newly arrived Original Midnight Express (Dennis Condrey & Randy Rose). They would also face The Varsity Club in rematches for the United States Tag-Team Championship, as well as face The Commandos. On February 15, 1989, in Cleveland, OH at Clash of the Champions V the Fantastics received a televised rematch with the Varsity Club, but were unsuccessful. They then left NWA, due to problems with booker Kevin Sullivan.

=== All Japan Pro Wrestling (1989) ===
Following a very brief stint in the CWF, the Fantastics resurfaced in All Japan Pro Wrestling in the summer of 1989, entering the AJPW Summer Action Series 1989. They made their first appearance on July 1, 1989, and defeated Isamu Teranishi & Mighty Inoue at a television taping in Omiya, Saitama, Japan. The Fantastics were undefeated in their first nine matches and were finally defeated by Dean Malenko & Joe Malenko on July 15, 1989, at Korakuen Hall in Tokyo, Japan. They finished the Summer Action Series with a 17–3 record before Bobby Fulton returned to the United States.

=== World Championship Wrestling (1989–1990) ===
While Rogers wrestled in Japan Fulton resurfaced in the American Wrestling Association (AWA) teaming with his brother, Jackie Fulton, as the Fantastics. They briefly feuded with AWA Tag Team Champions Mike Enos and Wayne Bloom. On September 21, 1989, the "new" Fantastics made their debut for WCW at a television taping in Savannah, GA where they lost to NWA World Tag-Team Champions The Fabulous Freebirds. On the October 21, 1989 edition of World Championship Wrestling the new tandem earned their first televised victory, pinning Lee Scott & Agent Steel. They would then lose to old nemesis The Midnight Express on December 23's edition of World Championship Wrestling to close out the year.

The brother tandem competed infrequently for World Championship Wrestling, as their next match would not come until March 30, 1990, when they faced Jack Victory & Rip Morgan in Lynchburg, VA. On July 30 the Fultons defeated Barry Horowitz & Scotty Williams at an NWA Power Hour taping for a match that would air on August 12. On the same show they were interviewed by Missy Hyatt and were referred to as the Fantastics, and given the length of time since their last televised appearance it was referred to as their arrival. On the August 24, 1990 edition of the Power Hour they received a title opportunity against NWA World Tag-Team Champions Doom, but were unsuccessful. A day later they had another shot at Doom on NWA Pro but were also defeated. After this Bobby Fulton left the promotion, leaving Jackie to compete in singles action for a time.

=== South Atlantic Pro Wrestling (1990–1991) ===
On October 19, 1990, the duo of Bobby and Jackie Fulton resurfaced in South Atlantic Pro Wrestling. Wrestling at a television taping for a match that would air the following month, the Fantastics defeated Tommy Landell & Trent Knight. On December 29, 1990, the Fantastics won the SAPW Tag-Team Championship from The Pitbulldogs (The Pitbulls) at a TV taping in Greenville, SC. They would continue to wrestler for South Atlantic Pro Wrestling until at least March 1991.

=== Smoky Mountain Wrestling (1991–1992) ===
When Jim Cornette began his own promotion, Smokey Mountain Wrestling (SMW) Bobby Fulton and his brother Jackie wrestled as "The Fantastics" for Cornette's company and occasionally as "The Fantastic Ones" in other promotions. The brothers made their debut at the inaugural SMW taping on October 30, 1991, Greenville, SC, teaming up to defeat Ivan Koloff & Vladimir Koloff in a match that would air on February 8, 1992. The duo would immediately get into a feud with Jim Cornette and The Heavenly Bodies. On March 12, 1992, the brothers introduced original Fantastics member Tommy Rogers as a surprise partner on an episode of Smoky Mountain television; the three Fantastics then defeated Billy Black, Joel Deaton, and Jimmy Golden.

In March 1992 the Fantastics entered a tournament to crown the SMW Tag-Team Champions. On March 12 they defeated The Wild Bunch (Billy Black & Joel Deaton) to advance past the first round of the tournament. On April 9 the Fantastics were victorious over The Maulers (Jack Victory & Rip Morgan) to progress to the finals. However, on April 23, 1992, the Heavenly Bodies defeated them to win the titles. The Fantastics would challenge the Bodies that spring and summer, but were unsuccessful in their efforts to gain the Smoky Mountain titles. Their final match came on November 8, 1992, at a house show against Robert Fuller & Jimmy Golden.

=== All Japan Pro Wrestling (1990–1994) ===
Meanwhile, overseas the original version of the Fantastics remained ongoing. On January 2, 1990, Tommy Rogers and Bobby Fulton would reunite in All Japan Pro Wrestling. Competing in the AJPW New Year Giant Series 1990, they defeated Isamu Teranishi & Mighty Inoue in Tokyo. The following night they challenged Footloose (Samson Fuyuki & Toshiaki Kawada) for the All Asia Tag Team Championship, but were defeated. As with their tour the previous year, the Fantastics were highly successful in the Giant Series 1990, registering a record of 18–2 with their only other loss coming to Isamu Teranishi & Tiger Mask (Mitsuharu Misawa) at a tour event on January 26.

Rogers and Fulton would return again that summer for the AJPW Summer Action Series II 1990 series and were again quite successful. They competed for the vacant All Asia Tag-Team Championship on September 7, 1990, in Fukui against Johnny Ace & Kenta Kobashi but were defeated. They would return for regular tours over the next three years and achieve considerable success, occasionally teaming with Jackie Fulton in six man matches.

=== World Championship Wrestling (1994–1995) ===
On October 30, 1994, the original version of The Fantastics made their return to World Championship Wrestling at a WCW Worldwide taping in Orlando, Florida, defeating Sonny Trout & Rick Thames. On the December 3 edition of the show they challenged WCW World Tag Team Champions Pretty Wonderful for their titles. On the December 10, 1994 episode of WCW Saturday Night the Fantastics suffered their first defeat in their comeback when they fell to Harlem Heat. The same day on Worldwide their challenge to Pretty Wonderful for the tag-team championship was unsuccessful.

On the January 21, 1995 edition of Worldwide the Fantastics received another shot at the WCW Tag-Team belts, this time against new champions Harlem Heat. Once more Rogers and Fulton failed to secure the titles. After this the tandem slid down the card. On the March 26 edition of Worldwide they were again beaten by Pretty Wonderful, and on April 30 lost to The Blue Bloods (Lord Steven Regal & Bobby Eaton). Their final date with the promotion came on June 18, 1995, in a dark match against Harlem Heat at the Great American Bash 95 PPV.

=== All Japan Pro Wrestling (1995–1996) ===
Tommy Rogers and Bobby Fulton returned for another tour of All Japan on January 2, 1995, taking part in the AJPW New Year Giant Series 1995. This time they lost their opening bout, falling to Ryukaku Izumida & Tamon Honda in Tokyo, Japan. As with previous years they were successful in the overall event, and on January 29, 1995, unsuccessfully challenged Jun Akiyama & Takao Omori for the vacated All Asia tag-team championship. Following their departure from World Championship Wrestling they returned for their normal summer tour of All-Japan, taking part in the AJPW Summer Action Series II 1995 tour to great success.

In 1996 the Fantastics would embark on two additional tours of All Japan. Their final match saw Fulton & Rogers defeat Kentaro Shiga. & Satoru Asako

=== World Championship Wrestling (1996) ===
On October 21, 1996, the Fantastics made a surprise appearance on Monday Nitro, losing to The Faces of Fear in a match airing from Mankato, Minnesota. The following day they faced High Voltage in a dark match at a WCW Saturday Night taping.

=== World Wrestling Federation (1997) ===
While not wrestling together, both Tommy Rogers and Bobby Fulton made appearances as the World Wrestling Federation began to showcase its new Light Heavyweight division. The partners would face off against each other on June 16, 1997, when Rogers wrestled Bobby Fulton on an episode of Raw is War as part of the tournament to crown the inaugural WWF Light Heavyweight Championship. Rogers defeated a heelish Fulton in the match, but would lose to Brian Christopher in the next round of the tournament.

=== Later years (1997–2005) ===
In August 1997 Bobby and Jackie Fulton reformed their version of the Fantastics, traveling to New Dimension Wrestling. They made their return as a team October 25, 1997 at an event in Thomasville, North Carolina, losing to The Mavericks (Chris Mantell & Buck Mantell). The Fantastics would continue to make appearances for NDW through the remainder of the year and 1998, facing The Terminators, as well as fellow babyface teams The Rock 'n' Roll Express and The Bushwhackers (their old Sheepherder opponents).

In subsequent years the Fantastics occasionally worked as a team on the independent circuit. On March 12, 2004, the original Fantastics reformed for the first time in eight years when Tommy Rogers and Bobby Fulton traveled to International Wrestling Association Japan to compete in the IWA Japan Exciting Series 2004. They won their debut in Osaka, defeating Ryo Miyake & Yukihide Ueno. Three days later in Chiba they challenged IWA World Tag-Team Champions Steve Williams & Ryo Miyake, but were defeated.

Returning to the United States, the Fantastics then faced The Midnight Express for the first time in many years. Held at the WFP 3rd Annual Night Of The Superstars event Waynesboro, Virginia, this encounter saw them defeat Bobby Eaton and Dennis Condrey. On January 29, 2005, Rogers & Fulton joined forces with The Rock 'n Roll Express to defeat all three active members of The Midnight Express (Bobby Eaton, Stan Lane, and Dennis Condrey) at the WrestleReunion event in Tampa, Florida. This would mark the final appearance of the original version of The Fantastics, as Rogers retired from the ring in 2007.

Eight months later, on August 25, 2005, the Fantastics returned for WrestleReunion 2 to compete in a four corners match. This time it was the Fulton Brothers competing as the Fantastics, and they were victorious against The Samoan Island Tribe (Samu & Alofa), The Backseat Boyz (Johnny Kashmere & Trent Acid) and The Thunderfoots (Dave Deaton & Joel Deaton).

=== Aftermath ===
On June 1, 2015, Tommy Rogers died at the age of 54. Since then, Fulton has done multiple reunions with Terry Taylor as the Original Fantastics aka The Fantastic Ones.

In their early years, they used the ZZ Top song "Sharp Dressed Man" as an entrance theme. One night they were approached and told that Dusty Hill was inviting them to meet him at a local bar in Texas, which Rogers and Fulton thought was a prank. When Hill actually showed up, they expected to be served with a cease and desist order for using the song. Hill was actually a huge fan of them, and loved that they used the song.

== Championships and accomplishments ==
- Rogers and Fulton
  - Continental Wrestling Association
    - AWA Southern Tag Team Championship (1 Time)
    - AWA Southern Tag Team Championship Tournament (1986)
  - Jim Crockett Promotions
    - NWA United States Tag Team Championship (2 times)
    - NWA United States Tag Team Championship Tournament (1988)
  - National Wrestling League
    - NWL Tag Team Championship (1 Time)
  - Pro Wrestling America
    - PWA Tag Team Championship (1 time)
  - Pro Wrestling Illustrated
    - PWI ranked them # 63 of the 100 best tag teams during the "PWI Years" in 2003.
  - Universal Wrestling Federation
    - UWF Tag Team Championship (2 times)
  - World Class Wrestling Association
    - NWA American Tag Team Championship (2 times)
    - WCWA Tag Team Championship (2 times)
  - Wrestling Observer Newsletter awards
    - Feud of the Year (1988) vs. the Midnight Express
- Bobby & Jackie Fulton
  - Big Time Wrestling
    - BTW Ohio Tag Team Championship (1 time)
  - Smoky Mountain Wrestling
    - SMW Tag Team Championship (1 time)
  - South Atlantic Pro Wrestling
    - SAPW Tag Team Championship (1 time)
- Other titles

- IWA Tag Team Championship (1 time)
- SCW Tag Team Champions (1 time)
