= SMW Tag Team Championship =

Professional wrestling tag team championship

Details
- Promotion: Smoky Mountain Wrestling
- Date established: April 23, 1992
- Date retired: November 26, 1995
Statistics
- First champion: The Heavenly Bodies
- Most reigns: (as team) The Rock 'n' Roll Express (10 times) (as individual) Robert Gibson, Ricky Morton (10 times)
- Longest reign: The Heavenly Bodies, (114 days)
- Shortest reign: The Heavenly Bodies, The Rock 'n' Roll Express (1 day)

The SMW Tag Team Championship was the tag team title in Smoky Mountain Wrestling. It existed from 1992 until 1995 when the promotion closed. This is a tag team championship in the sport of professional wrestling.

== Title history ==
Key
No.	Overall reign number
Reign	Reign number for the specific team—reign numbers for the individuals are in parentheses, if different
Days	Number of days held

No.	Champion	Championship change			Reign statistics		Notes	Ref.
No.	Champion	Date	Event	Location	Reign	Days	Notes	Ref.
1	The Heavenly Bodies (Stan Lane and Tom Prichard)	April 23, 1992	SMW Live event	Harrogate, Tennessee	1	107	Defeated The Fantastics (Bobby and Jackie Fulton) in a tournament final. Aired May 9, 1992 on SMW TV.	
2	The Fantastics (Bobby and Jackie Fulton)	August 8, 1992	Fire on the Mountain	Johnson City, Tennessee	1	2		
3	The Heavenly Bodies (Stan Lane and Tom Prichard)	August 10, 1992	SMW Live event	Benton, Tennessee	2	95	Aired September 5, 1992 on SMW TV	
4	The Rock 'n' Roll Express (Robert Gibson and Ricky Morton)	November 13, 1992	SMW Live event	Harlan, Kentucky	1	13	This was a hospital elimination match.	
5	The Heavenly Bodies (Stan Lane and Tom Prichard)	November 26, 1992	SMW Live event	Hazard, Kentucky	3	1	This was a Falls Count Anywhere match.	
6	The Rock 'n' Roll Express (Robert Gibson and Ricky Morton)	November 27, 1992	SMW Live event	Welch, West Virginia	2	1	This was a Texas Death match.	
7	The Heavenly Bodies (Stan Lane and Tom Prichard)	November 28, 1992	SMW Live event	Johnson City, Tennessee	4	1	This was a Street Fight.	
8	The Rock 'n' Roll Express (Robert Gibson and Ricky Morton)	November 29, 1992	SMW Live event	Knoxville, Tennessee	3	50	This was a Barbed wire steel cage match.	
9	The Heavenly Bodies (Stan Lane and Tom Prichard)	January 18, 1993	SMW Live event	Newton, North Carolina	5	117	Aired January 30, 1993 on SMW TV.	
10	The Rock 'n' Roll Express (Robert Gibson and Ricky Morton)	May 15, 1993	SMW Live event	Johnson City, Tennessee	4	44	This was a Loser of fall leaves SMW match. Lane lost the fall.	
11	The Bruise Brothers (Don and Ron)	June 28, 1993	SMW Live event	Council, Virginia	1	75	Aired July 10-17, 1993 on SMW TV.	
12	The Rock 'n' Roll Express (Robert Gibson and Ricky Morton)	September 11, 1993	SMW Live event	Morristown, Tennessee	5	74	This was a hair vs. titles match.	
13	The Heavenly Bodies (Jimmy Del Ray and Tom Prichard)	November 24, 1993	WWF Survivor Series (1993)	Boston, Massachusetts	1 (1, 6)	86		
14	The Rock 'n' Roll Express (Robert Gibson and Ricky Morton)	February 18, 1994	SMW Live event	Port Huron, Michigan	6	1		
15	The Heavenly Bodies (Jimmy Del Ray and Tom Prichard)	February 19, 1994	SMW Live event	Taylor, Michigan	2 (2, 7)	41		
16	The Rock 'n' Roll Express (Robert Gibson and Ricky Morton)	April 1, 1994	SMW Live event	Pikeville, Kentucky	7	22	This was a Losing team leaves SMW Steel Cage Match.	
17	Chris Candido and Brian Lee	April 23, 1994	SMW Live event	Johnson City, Tennessee	1	104	Aired May 7th, 1994 on SMW TV.	
18	The Rock 'n' Roll Express (Robert Gibson and Ricky Morton)	August 5, 1994	SMW Live event	Knoxville, Tennessee	8	1	Aired August 13th, 1994 on SMW TV.	
19	Chris Candido and Brian Lee	August 6, 1994	SMW Live event	Johnson City, Tennessee	2	2	This was also a hair vs. hair match, where Ricky Morton and Tammy Fytch's hair are on the line. Aired August 13th, 1994 on SMW TV.	
20	The Rock 'n' Roll Express (Robert Gibson and Ricky Morton)	August 8, 1994	SMW Live event	Saltville, Virginia	9	56	Aired August 20, 1994 on SMW TV.	
21	The Gangstas (New Jack and Mustapha Saed)	October 3, 1994	N/A	Morganton, North Carolina	1	83	Awarded the titles after threatening a racial discrimination lawsuit over the referee's decision in a loss to The Rock 'n' Roll Express on September 16, 1994 in Knoxville, Tennessee.	
22	The Rock 'n' Roll Express (Robert Gibson and Ricky Morton)	December 25, 1994	SMW Live event	Knoxville, Tennessee	10	103	Aired on January 07, 1995 on SMW TV.	
23	The Dynamic Duo (Al Snow and Unabomb)	April 7, 1995	SMW Live event	Pikeville, Kentucky	1	90	Aired on April 15, 1995 on SMW TV.	
24	The Thugs (Tony Anthony and Tracy Smothers)	July 6, 1995	SMW Live event	Jellico, Tennessee	1	29	Aired July 15, 1995 on SMW TV.	
25	The Heavenly Bodies (Jimmy Del Ray and Tom Prichard)	August 4, 1995	SMW Live event	Knoxville, Tennessee	3 (3, 8)	114	Aired on August 12, 1995 on SMW TV.	
—	Deactivated	November 26, 1995	—	—	—	—	Titles retired when SMW closed after holding its last event on November 26, 1995, in Cookeville, Tennessee.	
