= Jimmy Del Ray =

American professional wrestler (1962-2014)

Personal information
- Born: David Everett Ferrier; November 30, 1962 Grove City, Pennsylvania, U.S.
- Died: December 6, 2014 (aged 52) Tampa, Florida, U.S.
- Cause of death: Myocardial infarction

Professional wrestling career
- Ring name(s): Jimmy Backlund; Jimmy Del Ray; Jimmy Richland; Jimmy Graffiti; Jumo Kenya
- Billed height: 5 ft 10 in (178 cm)
- Billed weight: 230 lb (104 kg)
- Trained by: The Mighty Yankee
- Debut: 1985
- Retired: 1997

David Everett Ferrier (November 30, 1962 – December 6, 2014) was an American professional wrestler, better known by his ring name, "Gigolo" Jimmy Del Ray. Del Ray was best known for his appearances in the World Wrestling Federation (WWF) as one half of the Heavenly Bodies with his tag team partner, Tom Prichard.

== Professional wrestling career ==
=== Early career (1985–1992) ===
Ferrier was trained by the Mighty Yankee and debuted in 1985 as "Jimmy Richland", which most thought was his real name. In the late 1980s, Del Ray joined Championship Wrestling from Florida as "Jomo Kenya". He later changed his ring name to "Jimmy Backlund" and formed a tag team with Brett Sawyer known as "The Playboys". The Playboys were awarded the vacant FCW Tag Team Championship on July 1, 1989. They held the titles until August 22, when they were defeated by the Nasty Boys. From 1989 to 1991 he worked in Japan for Frontier Martial-Arts Wrestling. On November 22, 1991, he worked for WWF as Jimmy Richland losing to Skinner on a house show. In 1992, he worked for W*ING.

=== Smoky Mountain Wrestling (1993–1995) ===
In January 1993 Del Ray joined Smoky Mountain Wrestling (SMW), where he replaced Stan Lane as one half of the Heavenly Bodies with Tom Prichard. He was given the name Jimmy Del Ray because Lane was billed during his career as being from Delray Beach, Florida. The Heavenly Bodies were managed by James E. Cornette and won the SMW Tag Team Championship on three occasions. Cornette put the "Gigolo" moniker on his name as a play off his physique. While Del Ray was an agile and able wrestler at the time, he had a slightly pudgy midsection that shook, or "jiggled" when he did a taunting dance. Del Ray would work with SMW until the company shut down in December 1995.

=== World Wrestling Federation (1993–1995) ===
Along with Cornette, the Heavenly Bodies debuted in the World Wrestling Federation in 1993. They made their first televised appearance on the August 9, 1993 episode of Monday Night Raw, defeating Bobby Who and Mike Bucci. They made two more appearances on Raw that year; they were defeated by World Tag Team Champions The Steiner Brothers in a title match on August 30, and were victorious over Mark Thomas and Scott Taylor on August 4. At SummerSlam 1993 on August 30, the Heavenly Bodies faced the Steiner Brothers with the World Tag Team Championship on the line, but were defeated.

At the 1993 Survivor Series on November 24 in the Boston Garden, the Heavenly Bodies faced the Rock 'n' Roll Express for the SMW Tag Team Championship. Though the Rock 'N Roll Express appeared to have the match won, the Heavenly Bodies defeated them after Del Ray struck Robert Gibson with Cornette's tennis racket while the referee was distracted, enabling Prichard to pin Gibson and win the titles.

At WrestleMania X on March 20, 1994, in Madison Square Garden, the Heavenly Bodies defeated The Bushwhackers in a dark match. They returned to WWF television on the April 25 episode of Raw, defeating John Paul and Jason Headings.

At the 1994 Survivor Series on November 23, the Heavenly Bodies took part in a ten-man survivor match, teaming with Bam Bam Bigelow, Tatanka, and King Kong Bundy as Ted DiBiase's "Million Dollar Team". The Million Dollar Team defeated their opponents, "Guts and Glory" (Lex Luger, Mabel, Adam Bomb, and the Smoking Gunns), although both Prichard and Del Ray were eliminated from the match. Prichard and Del Ray both participated in the 30 man Royal Rumble match on January 22, 1995. He was eliminated by British Bulldog. They made sporadic appearances on Raw over the next year, with their final appearance being a loss to The Smoking Gunns on the March 20, 1995 episode of Raw. Jimmy Del Ray lost a singles match to Bret Hart on Superstars on April 25, 1995. Del Ray's last WWF match was a loss to Intercontinental champion Shawn Michaels on Raw July 24, 1995.

=== United States Wrestling Association (1995) ===
After WWF, Del Ray and Prichard went to United States Wrestling Association where they defeated PG-13 (J. C. Ice and Wolfie D) to capture the USWA Tag Team Championship. They would feud with PG-13.

=== Extreme Championship Wrestling (1995–1996) ===
The Heavenly Bodies made several appearances in Extreme Championship Wrestling in December 1995 as members of Raven's Nest. At December To Dismember: Ultimate Jeopardy on December 9, the Heavenly Bodies faced Raven's enemies, the Public Enemy, in a tag team bout. The match had stipulations applying to the losers - if the Public Enemy lost, they would face one another later that night, while if the Heavenly Bodies lost, the Eliminators (members of Raven's Nest) would be forced to leave ECW, while their manager, Jason, would have his head shaved. Moreover, if the Heavenly Bodies were defeated, then Raven's valet, Beulah McGillicutty, would be forced to spend a week with Tommy Dreamer, while Raven's Nest member Stevie Richards would be locked in a steel cage for five minutes with the winners of the Ultimate Jeopardy match later that night. The Heavenly Bodies lost their match, leading to the enforcement of the aforementioned stipulations. Later that evening, Raven, Richards, the Eliminators, and the Heavenly Bodies faced Dreamer, the Pitbulls, and the Public Enemy in an ultimate jeopardy match. The match was won by Dreamer, who pinned Richards. Richards was subsequently locked in the cage with Dreamer's team, but Raven and his Nest attacked Dreamer's team before they could hurt him. Raven's Nest then attacked Dreamer's team until The Sandman drove them away.

After December to Dismember the Heavenly Bodies disbanded when Tom Prichard went back to WWF. Del Ray lost to Bubba Ray Dudley at House Party, while he was managed by Mr. Hughes.

=== World Championship Wrestling (1996–1997) ===
In October 1996, Del Ray joined World Championship Wrestling (WCW) as Jimmy Graffiti. He was part of the cruiserweight division and competed against Dean Malenko, Chris Jericho, Rey Mysterio, and Billy Kidman. He took part in the three-ring battle royal at the 1996 World War 3 event on November 24. He also wrestled as Jim Richland. Del Ray remained in WCW until a knee injury forced him to retire in 1997.

=== Retirement (1997–2014) ===
After retiring, he worked as an instructor in Steve Keirn's Floridian professional wrestling school for several years, training wrestlers such as Buck Quartermain and Steve Madison, and managed a tag team known as The New Heavenly Bodies. Del Ray later retired from training wrestlers and started a hardwood flooring company named Ferrier's Fine Flooring Inc. in Tampa, Florida in March 2006. In September 2013, he registered another Tampa company called Ferrier's Flooring Inc.

== Death ==
Ferrier, who lived in Valrico, Florida, died at the Tampa General Hospital on December 6, 2014. He was 52 years old. Ferrier had suffered a heart attack at the wheel of his truck on US 301 near the Florida State Fairgrounds. Two days later, WWE.com noted his death and offered condolences to his friends, family and colleagues.

== Championships and accomplishments ==
- Championship Wrestling from Florida
  - FCW Tag Team Championship (1 time) – with Brett Sawyer
- Wrestling International New Generations
  - W*ING World Junior Heavyweight Championship (1 time)
- Florida Championship Wrestling / Pro Wrestling Federation
  - PWF Junior Heavyweight Championship (3 times)
- Future Championship Wrestling
  - FCW Light Heavyweight Championship (1 time)
- Independent Wrestling Association Mid-South
  - IWA Mid-South Light Heavyweight Championship (1 time)
- Pennsylvania Championship Wrestling
  - PCW Tag Team Championship (1 time) – with Tom Prichard
- Pro Wrestling Illustrated
  - PWI ranked him 73 of the 100 best tag teams of the "PWI Years" with Tom Prichard in 2003
- Smoky Mountain Wrestling
  - SMW Beat the Champ Television Championship (1 time)
  - SMW Tag Team Championship (3 times) – with Tom Prichard
- Frontier Martial Arts Wrestling
  - AWA World Light Heavyweight Championship (2 times)
- United States Wrestling Association
  - USWA World Tag Team Championship (1 time) – with Tom Prichard
