= Bobby Fulton =

American professional wrestler (born 1960)

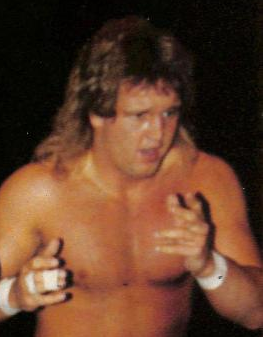
- Fulton, c. 1987

Personal information
- Born: James Franklin Hines; October 4, 1960 (age 65) Chillicothe, Ohio, U.S.

Professional wrestling career
- Ring name(s): Bobby Fulton; Jimmy Hines; Sheik of Araby
- Billed height: 5 ft 10 in (178 cm)
- Billed weight: 220 lb (100 kg)
- Billed from: Los Angeles, California
- Debut: June 17, 1977
- Retired: July 16, 2020

James Hines (born October 4, 1960) is an American retired professional wrestler, better known by his ring name Bobby Fulton. He was one-half of the tag team the Fantastics with Tommy Rogers.

== Professional wrestling career ==
=== Early career (1977–1984) ===
James Hines started wrestling as a 16-year-old, under the name Bobby Fulton. His first match was on June 17, 1977, in Clarksburg, West Virginia, in which he defeated Mad Dog Michaels by disqualification. In the main event of that same card, he lost a battle royal.

He spent his early career in Ohio, training and wrestling with the likes of Lord Zoltan, Fred Curry, Bull Curry and Dr. Jerry Graham. He worked for the WWWF on the Allentown and Hamburg television tapings where he faced Steve Travis and Fred Curry. He worked for Nick Gulas's Nashville territory, where he paired up with Eric Embry as the "brother" tag team of Bobby and Don Fulton.

He then moved on to Stu Hart's Calgary territory working with the likes of Bret Hart, The Dynamite Kid, The Cuban Assassin, Bobby Bass, Ross Hart, Bruce Hart, Giant Haystacks and Davey Boy Smith. Then it was on to the short-lived Knoxville territory forming a tag team with Terry Taylor called "The Fantastic Ones". After the territory closed, Hines and Taylor split up.

=== Fantastics (1984–2000) ===
He then moved on to the Jerry Jarrett's Continental Wrestling Association territory, where he worked preliminary matches. He then went to Southwest Championship Wrestling in San Antonio, Texas for Joe Blanchard, battling Adrian Street and Eric Embry in a series of scaffold matches. His new tag team partner Tommy Rogers started for Bill Watts' Mid-South Wrestling. There the Fantastics (Fulton and Rogers) formed and feuded with the Midnight Express.

In 1984, the team continued their feud with The Midnight Express in World Class Championship Wrestling that later extended into Jim Crockett Promotions.

In 1986, they had a feud with The Sheepherders (who would become the "Bushwhackers"), Butch Miller and Luke Williams in the Universal Wrestling Federation.

In 1987, back in WCCW, they feuded with the Rock 'n' Roll RPMs (Mike Davis and Tommy Lane). They won the feud by winning a scaffold match at the "Parade of Champions" on May 3, 1987. The Fantastics also made an appearance at the World Wrestling Council in Puerto Rico.

They next went to the NWA's Jim Crockett Promotions to continue their feud with The Midnight Express and to win the NWA United States Tag Team Titles on two occasions. They also defeated The Sheepherders to win the vacant NWA Mid-America Tag Team Championship. In 1989, they left and have been wrestling, sometimes together, sometimes not, in the independent circuit around the United States, and in All Japan Pro Wrestling.

In 1990, he started his own territory in Ohio called James Hines presents Big Time Wrestling (which was a precursor to Smoky Mountain Wrestling). The federation was based primarily in Circleville, Ohio. Hines brought in talent like Hacksaw Jim Duggan, Ronnie Garvin, Abdullah the Butcher, Cactus Jack, Wahoo McDaniel, Jake Roberts, Beau James and many more to participate in regular cards held in Circleville at the Pickaway County Fairgrounds Coliseum. Hines was the Big Time Wrestling champion several times, and also often teamed with his brother, Jackie Fulton, as the Fantastics, on these cards. These cards inspired wrestlers like Shark Boy and many others to become pro wrestlers. Fulton and Ivan Koloff ran a wrestling school in North Carolina in the early 1990s. The Fantastics (Bobby and Jackie Fulton) then made regular appearances in All Japan and in Smoky Mountain Wrestling.

The Fantastics made a brief appearance in the WWF in June 1997 when Fulton wrestled Rogers in what was billed as a Light Heavyweight Match. According to Fulton, they were brought in at the request of Jim Cornette to convince Vince McMahon to start a light heavyweight division, which eventually started.

=== Later career (2000–2020) ===
After 2000, Fulton started wrestling under a mask at various shows as the Sheik of Araby as a tribute to one of his idols the Original Sheik. Often he would taunt the crowd by threatening to raise gas prices. He worked with a lot of young new talent under this persona and helped them as they were breaking in.

In October 2015, Fulton announced he will undergo a retirement tour called the "Fantastic Finale", which ended in 2017.

On June 10, 2017, Fulton teamed up with "Big Time" Josh Lewis to win the NWA Mid-America Tag Team Championships from The East and West Express in NWA Supreme. The East and West Express regained the championship on June 23, 2017.

In March 2016, Hines started promoting events again under the banner World Classic Professional Big Time Wrestling, in which he had an ongoing rivalry with ECW original Shane Douglas. Some of the stars who have appeared in WCPBTW include Sting, Tito Santana, Ricky Morton, Ronnie Garvin, Cowboy Bob Orton, Tony Atlas, Kevin Sullivan, J. J. Dillon, Jimmy Valiant, The Sandman, Sabu, The Barbarian, Buff Bagwell, Bobby Eaton, The Honky Tonk Man, Bushwhacker Luke, Bill Dundee, Tracy Smothers, and Tommy Rich.

Fulton wrestled his final match on December 14, 2019 at the independent show "Bobby Eaton: A Night of Appreciation," in an 8-man tag team match where he teamed with Brad Thomas, Ryan Dookie, and Shane Williams to defeat the team of Beau James, Bill Dundee, George South, and Stan Lee.

On July 16, 2020, he announced his retirement but still wrestles from time to time for World Classic Professional Big Time Wrestling.

== Personal life ==
Hines became a born-again Christian and also has been preaching the Christian gospel since October 2003. Hines has been married 4 times. He has two sons, his youngest son, Jarron, followed in his father’s footsteps, beginning a wrestling career in 2023, he’s wrestled for the National Wrestling Alliance and World Classic Professional Big Time Wrestling, as well as some independent organizations. Jarron was trained by Lodi, Sam Houston, Mark Wolf and his father. Bobby was diagnosed with throat cancer in December 2019, and began chemotherapy the next month. On June 6, 2020, he announced via Twitter that he was cancer-free.

== Championships and accomplishments ==
- Big Time Wrestling
  - BTW Triple Crown Heavyweight Championship (2 times)
  - BTW Legends American Grand Prix Championship (2 times)
  - BTW Ohio Tag Team Championship (7 times) - with Jackie Fulton, Sean Casey and Rip Rogers
- Central States Wrestling
  - NWA Central States Television Championship (1 time)
- Continental Wrestling Association
  - AWA Southern Tag Team Championship (1 time) – with Tommy Rogers
- Heroes And Legends Wrestling
  - HLW Tag Team Championship (1 time) - with Tracy Smothers
- Jim Crockett Promotions
  - NWA United States Tag Team Championship (2 times) – with Tommy Rogers
- National Wrestling Alliance
  - NWA Mid-America Tag Team Championship (2 times) with Tommy Rogers (1) and Josh Lewis (1)
- Smoky Mountain Wrestling
  - SMW Tag Team Championship (1 time) – with Jackie Fulton
- Southwest Championship Wrestling
  - SCW Southwest Junior Heavyweight Championship (1 time)
- Universal Wrestling Federation
  - UWF World Tag Team Championship (2 times) – with Tommy Rogers
- World Class Championship Wrestling / World Class Wrestling Association
  - NWA American Tag Team Championship (2 times) – with Tommy Rogers
  - WCWA World Tag Team Championship (2 times) – with Tommy Rogers
- Pro Wrestling Illustrated
  - PWI ranked him # 286 of the 500 best singles wrestlers during the "PWI Years" in 2003.
  - PWI ranked him # 63 of the 100 best tag teams during the "PWI Years" with Tommy Rogers in 2003.
- WAR Wrestling
  - WAR Hall of Fame (2017)
- Wrestling Observer Newsletter
  - Feud of the Year (1988) with Tommy Rogers vs. Bobby Eaton and Stan Lane
