= Mark Young (wrestler) =

American professional wrestler (1967–2016)

Personal information
- Born: Luke Joseph Mark Scarpa Jr. April 23, 1967 Atlanta, Georgia, U.S.
- Died: February 25, 2016 (aged 48)
- Family: Chief Jay Strongbow (father)

Professional wrestling career
- Ring name(s): Mark Young; Private Mark Pyle; Vince Young; Todd Overbow; Mark Scarpa
- Billed height: 1.86 m (6 ft 1 in)
- Billed weight: 105 kg (231 lb; 16.5 st)
- Billed from: Atlanta, Georgia; Minneapolis, Minnesota
- Trained by: Stu Hart
- Debut: 1986
- Retired: 1993

Luke Joseph "Joe" Mark Scarpa Jr. (April 23, 1967 – February 25, 2016) was an American professional wrestler, known by his ring name Mark Young, who competed in the World Wrestling Federation in the 1980s and early 1990s, World Championship Wrestling, and many independent promotions. He was the adopted son of Chief Jay Strongbow.

== Early life ==
Scarpa was a second generation wrestler; his adopted father was Chief Jay Strongbow who wrestled in the World Wide Wrestling Federation in the 1970s and 1980s.

== Career ==
=== Early years (1986–1989) ===
He was trained by Stu Hart and made his professional wrestling debut in 1986 for Stampede Wrestling in Calgary, wrestling as Mark Scarpa. He left the promotion in January 1987.

Scarpa signed with the World Wrestling Federation as a wrestler in star spangled banner trunks to represent his country. In his debut he lost to Steve Lombardi on November 11, 1986, in Spokane, Washington. He wrestled intermittently for the next few months on house shows, facing opponents such as Barry O and Jimmy Jack Funk. His last match was against Funk in Calgary, Alberta Canada on February 14, 1987. Scarpa made a brief return to the World Wrestling Federation in March 1988, when he teamed with David Stoudemire to face The Islanders on the March 20th episode of Wrestling Challenge. Young would also appear on Prime Time Wrestling in a tag match against Demolition, and later faced Greg Valentine on the April 17th edition of Prime Time. In April 1988, Scarpa joined Continental Championship Wrestling. By this time, they were transitioning away from the National Wrestling Alliance and became the Continental Wrestling Federation. While there, he was forced into D.I. Bob Carter's Honor Guard after losing a match to Tony Anthony. He also changed his name to Mark Pyle. He would assist Carter and Detroit Demolition to win the NWA Southeast Continental Tag Team Championship from The Nightmares, who would also implode as Nightmare Ken Wayne turned on Nightmare Danny Davis, on May 29. In February 1989, Scarpa, as Vince Young, would join World Championship Wrestling as part of a wave of fresh talent brought in under the new ownership of the company. Now given a breakdancing gimmick, Young defeated Trent Knight in his debut on the February 18, 1989, issue of WCW's Saturday Night show. While well received in his first match, his second encounter was met by a fan during a February 25 match against Joe Cacane who yelled, "This ain't Chip 'n Dales!". Although he was not defeated in his tenure, Young abruptly left WCW following a March 23 match against Kendall Windham in Harrisonburg, VA after receiving a full-time position with the World Wrestling Federation.

=== World Wrestling Federation (1989 - 1990) ===
Now a contracted performer with the WWF, Mark Young made his return on June 27, 1989, when he defeated The Brooklyn Brawler in a match that aired on International Wrestling Challenge. This marked his first victory with his father's company. Young was positioned as an opening match talent that was roughly parallel to Paul Roma, Steve Lombardi, Brady Boone, and Tim Horner. Scarpa was given a strong initial push, scoring victories against Lombardi, Barry Horowitz, Bill Woods, and Bill Brundt that summer.

That August he began his first house show series, where he was paired off against Boris Zhukov. Young entered into a losing streak and was winless against the Russian, but rebounded to put together a lengthy series of house show victories over Barry Horowitz. Young also appeared on American television, teaming with Tim Horner and Jim Evans in tag-team matches against The Rougeau Brothers and The Brain Busters. In November he was paired against Earthquake in the latter's initial run of house show matches, and gained his first victory on American television when he pinned Barry Horowitz on the December 4th edition of Prime Time Wrestling.

Scarpa was less successful in 1990, and spent the first two months of the year on a losing streak before finally defeating Rico Fredrico in a house show match in West Palm Beach, FL on March 2. He would face "The Duke of Dorchester" Pete Doherty later that month and would defeat him in each encounter. On television however Young was now firmly established as an enhancement talent, losing to heels like Bad News Brown, Earthquake, Mr. Perfect, Al Perez and Rick Martel. After a brief departure for an All Japan tour that summer, following a loss to Ron Garvin on September 8, 1990, Scarpa left the company once more.

=== Last years (1990-1993) ===
In May and June 1990, Scarpa joined All Japan Pro Wrestling on their Super Power Series tour. Throughout the tour, he would team up with the likes of Abdullah The Butcher, Dusty Rhodes Jr., Johnny Smith, Terry Gordy, and Ranger Ross. Scarpa returned to the WWF in January 1992 under the monicker 'Todd Overbow'. His first match was in a dark match on January 27, 1992, at a Wrestling Challenge. Teaming with Khris Germany, they faced the Harris Twins in a tryout for the latter two wrestlers. Overbow appeared on American television for the first time in over a year when he faced Intercontinental Champion Roddy Piper on the February 15th edition of WWF Superstars. Later that month he faced Papa Shango on the February 23rd edition of Wrestling Challenge. He did not sign to a full-time contract, and these would be his only appearances that year. Still billed as Todd Overbow, Scarpa journeyed the following month to the Global Wrestling Federation. In his first match he was defeated by Steve Dane on March 20, 1992, on GWF TV. Overbow was winless during his brief time in the promotion.

Wrestling once more as Vince Young, Scarpa made a return to World Championship Wrestling when he teamed with Al Jackson in an unsuccessful effort against The Barbarian and Dan Spivey in a match that aired on the August 22nd, 1992 edition of WCW Worldwide. Scarpa retired in 1993. His last match on record occurred on May 8 for the Mid-Eastern Wrestling Federation, teaming with Trent Young (no relation) in a loss to Joe Thunder and Johnny Blaze.

== Later years and death ==
On April 3, 2012, his father died from complications from a fall.

On February 25, 2016, Scarpa died at the age of 48. Bob Blackburn (DI Bob Carter) shared on social media, Young died from suicide.

== See also ==
- List of premature professional wrestling deaths
