= Dennis Condrey =

American professional wrestler (1952–2026)

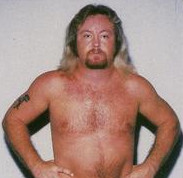
- Condrey in 1979

Personal information
- Born: Dennis Noel Condrey; February 1, 1950 Florence, Alabama, U.S.
- Died: March 20, 2026 (aged 76) Huntsville, Alabama, U.S.

Professional wrestling career
- Ring name(s): Dennis Condrey; Danny Condrey; Dante; Mr. Pro
- Billed height: 6 ft 0 in (183 cm)
- Billed weight: 255 lb (116 kg)
- Billed from: "The Dark Side" (in The Midnight Express); Muscle Shoals, Alabama
- Trained by: Joe Turner
- Debut: 1973
- Retired: 2011

Dennis Noel Condrey (February 1, 1950 – March 20, 2026) was an American professional wrestler. He was best known for his appearances with the Continental Wrestling Association, Jim Crockett Promotions and World Championship Wrestling in the 1970s and 1980s.

== Professional wrestling career ==
=== Early career (1973–1983) ===
Dennis Condrey was trained as a wrestler by Joe Turner, debuting in 1973. He spent the early years of his career wrestling primarily for Nick Gulas's Tennessee-based NWA Mid-America promotion.

In mid-1975, in the context of the United States Bicentennial, Condrey teamed up with Phil Hickerson to form a tag team known as the "Bicentennial Kings", managed by "Kangaroo" Al Costello. In 1975, they teamed with Al Greene to win the NWA World Six-Man Tag Team Championship. Between 1975 and March 1977, they held the NWA Southern Tag Team Championship three times, the NWA Southeastern Tag Team Championship once, and the NWA Mid-America Tag Team Championship twice. They feuded with teams such as Jackie Fargo and Jerry Jarrett, Bill Dundee and Tojo Yamamoto, and Chief Thundercloud and Danny Little Bear.

In March 1977, upon the schism between Nick Gulas and Jerry Jarrett, Condrey and Hickerson left NWA Mid-America to join Jarrett's breakaway Continental Wrestling Association. From March 1977 to January 1979, they held the NWA Mid-America Southern Tag Team Championship (later renamed the AWA Southern Tag Team Championship) four more times. They feuded with teams such as the Gibson Brothers (Ricky Gibson and Robert Gibson) and Tommy Gilbert and Tommy Rich.

In March 1978, Condrey and Hickerson moved from the Continental Wrestling Association to the Knoxville, Tennessee-based Southeastern Championship Wrestling promotion. They won the NWA Southeastern Tag Team Championship four times, feuding with Jimmy Golden and his series of tag team partners. In December 1978, they left Southeastern Championship Wrestling after losing a loser leaves town match to Ken Lucas and Kevin Sullivan.

In December 1978, Condrey and Hickerson returned to the Continental Wrestling Association, defeating Bill Dundee and Jerry Lawler to win the AWA Southern Tag Team Championship for an eighth time. The following month, they lost the titles to Dundee and Koko Ware. This marked their final appearance as a tag team. Condrey subsequently formed a new tag team, "the Big Cs", with Don Carson, with whom he won the AWA Southern Tag Team Championship for a ninth time. Condrey left the Continental Wrestling Association once more in March 1979.

Condrey returned to NWA Mid-America in March 1979. In June 1979, he defeated Gorgeous George Jr. in Chattanooga, Tennessee to win the NWA Mid-America Heavyweight Championship. He held the title until October 1979, when he lost to Dutch Mantel.

Throughout 1980, Condrey primarily divided his time between the Continental Wrestling Association and Georgia Championship Wrestling. In September 1980, he defeated Steve Keirn in the Bell Auditorium in Augusta, Georgia to win the NWA Georgia Heavyweight Championship. He lost the title to Tony Atlas the following month.

In 1980, Condrey formed a tag team with Randy Rose that became known as The Midnight Express. In 1981, Norvell Austin joined to form a stable. From 1981 to December 1983, they wrestled for Southeastern Championship Wrestling and the Continental Wrestling Association. The stable was dissolved in December 1983, when Condrey left for Mid-South Wrestling.

=== Mid-South Wrestling (1983–1984) ===
In November 1983, Condrey debuted in Mid-South Wrestling, where he immediately formed a new version of the Midnight Express, with Bobby Eaton with Jim Cornette as their manager.

At first, the Midnight Express was booked in an angle with the Mid-South Tag Team Champions Magnum T. A. and Mr. Wrestling II. The highlight of the angle saw Eaton and Condrey tarring and feathering Magnum T. A. in the middle of the ring. The Midnight Express first won the tag team title when Mr. Wrestling II turned on Magnum T. A., attacking him during the title match and allowing Eaton and Condrey to win the title without much opposition.

With Mr. Wrestling II and Magnum T. A. splitting up, the Midnight Express needed a new team to defend their newly won title against. They began a long series of matches against the Rock 'n' Roll Express (Ricky Morton and Robert Gibson) which ran well into the 1990s and spanned several wrestling promotions. The two teams feuded throughout 1984 in Mid-South Wrestling before the Midnight Express left the promotion. The Midnight Express versus Rock 'n' Roll Express series of matches were so well received by the fans that independent promoters continued to book them over a span of three decades and concluded with them wrestling the final match of the feud; Eaton against Ricky Morton. Morton won the match.

Eaton, Condrey, and Cornette left Mid-South Wrestling in December 1984.

=== World Class Championship Wrestling (1984–1985) ===
In December 1984, Condrey and Eaton (accompanied by Cornette) began wrestling regularly for the Texas-based World Class Championship Wrestling (WCCW) promotion. Upon arrival, they immediately began a feud with the Fantastics (Bobby Fulton and Tommy Rogers). At Christmas Star Wars in the Dallas Reunion Arena in December 1984, they unsuccessfully challenged the Fantastics for the NWA American Tag Team Championship. In January 1985, they defeated the Fantastics in the Dallas Sportatorium to win the NWA American Tag Team Championship. At Wrestling Star Wars later that month, they successfully defended the titles against the Fantastics. In March 1985, the titles were vacated after a controversial ending to a title match. At the 2nd Von Erich Memorial Parade of Champions in the Texas Stadium in May 1985, the Fantastics defeated the Midnight Express to win the vacant titles. The Midnight Express continued their feud with the Fantastics, but were unable to regain the titles. They left WCCW in June 1985, joining Jim Crockett Promotions that same month.

=== Jim Crockett Promotions (1985–1987) ===
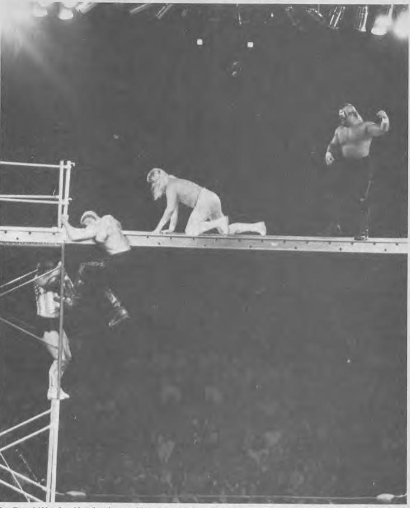
Condrey (bottom left) during the Midnight Express's scaffold match against the Road Warriors at Starrcade '86: The Skywalkers

In June 1985, Condrey, Eaton and Cornette signed with Jim Crockett Promotions (JCP) and were given national exposure on JCP's televised programs on SuperStation TBS.

In November 1985 at Starrcade '85: The Gathering, the Midnight Express lost to Jimmy Valiant and "Miss Atlanta Lively" in a street fight.

In November 1985, the Midnight Express reignited their feud with the Rock 'n' Roll Express and won the NWA World Tag Team Championship (Mid-Atlantic version) from them in February 1986 during Superstars on the Superstation. During the course of their heated angle, Eaton and Condrey lost the title to the Rock 'n' Roll Express in August 1986.

Eaton and Condrey also had long running feuds with The New Breed (Chris Champion and Sean Royal) as well as The Road Warriors (Road Warrior Animal and Road Warrior Hawk). The feud with the Road Warriors included a scaffold match at Starrcade '86: The Skywalkers in November 1986, which the Midnight Express lost.

Condrey left Jim Crockett Promotions in early 1987. He left overnight, giving no notice to Cornette, Eaton, or the NWA.

=== American Wrestling Association (1987) ===
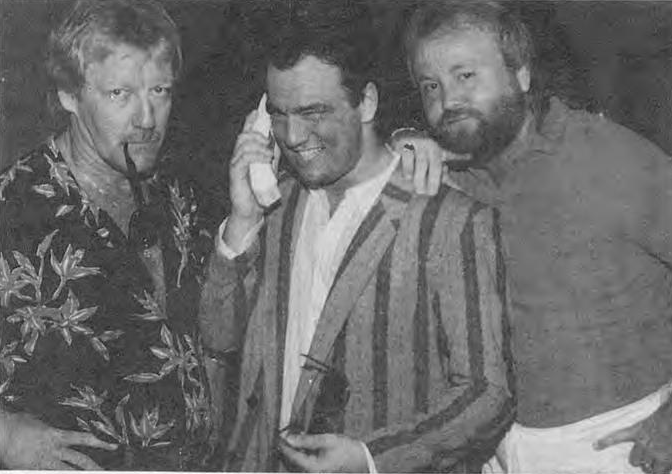
Randy Rose (left) and Dennis Condrey (right) with their manager Paul E. Dangerously (center), circa 1987

Condrey would reunite with former partner Randy Rose in the AWA under manager Paul E. Dangerously. "Loverboy" Dennis and "Ravishing" Randy called themselves "The Midnight Express", and claimed the right to the name, which had since been used by Condrey and Eaton (and later by "Beautiful" Bobby Eaton and "Sweet" Stan Lane) in the NWA.

They would defeat Jerry Lawler and Bill Dundee for the AWA World Tag Team titles on October 30, 1987, in Whitewater, Wisconsin. They would have a two-month title reign, losing the titles to the returning Midnight Rockers (Shawn Michaels and Marty Jannetty) on December 27, 1987, in Las Vegas, Nevada.

=== Return to World Championship Wrestling (1988–1989) ===
After wrestling on the independent circuit, Condrey returned to Jim Crockett Promotions - since renamed World Championship Wrestling - in November 1988, alongside Randy Rose and Paul E. Dangerously, now calling themselves "The Original Midnight Express". During the November 5 episode of World Championship Wrestling, Jim Cornette received an anonymous phone call. The caller ridiculed Cornette over Eaton and Lane's loss of the NWA World Tag Team Championship to the Road Warriors the prior week. Cornette recognized the caller and goaded him to come say it to his face. At that point, Dangerously and the Original Midnight Express hit the ring and proceeded to pummel Cornette and Stan Lane, who was wrestling in a singles match. By the time Bobby Eaton showed up, it was three on one. Cornette showed up the next week carrying his blood stained suit jacket, triggering a feud between the two teams.

The two teams wrestled at Starrcade '88: True Gritt, where Lane pinned Rose; following the match, both teams and their managers brawled. The feud continued until February 1989 at Chi-Town Rumble, where Condrey, Rose, and Dangerously were scheduled to face Eaton, Lane, and Cornette in a loser leaves town six-man tag team match. However, at this time Dusty Rhodes was replaced as head booker by George Scott. Jim Crockett Jr. already had a problem with Condrey due to his previous overnight disappearance and Scott had previous animosity with Rose, so Scott's appearance as top booker made for the catalyst to bury both teams and the feud. The feud was cooled off and the "loser leaves town" match was going to be used to kick one of them out of the territory once and for all and continue to bury the other. At the last minute, Condrey once again decided to leave the NWA, rather than take his PPV payoff and give Crockett and Scott the satisfaction. Jack Victory was brought in as his replacement and the match went forward, with Lane pinning Rose.

=== Continental Wrestling Federation and International Championship Wrestling (1989–1990) ===
Condrey returned to Alabama (now known as Continental) in the Spring of 1989. On July 22, 1989, Condrey defeated Tom Prichard to win the CWF Heavyweight Championship, before losing the title back to Prichard on December 6. He would also form a short-lived tag team called the "Lethal Weapons" with Doug Gilbert. Together, they went to the New England area to wrestle for International Championship Wrestling. On December 30, 1989, they defeated Phil Apollo and Vic Steamboat, who was subbing for Apollo's partner Eric Sbraccia, who no-showed, to win the ICW Tag Team Championship. They held onto the belts until March 1990, when they left the promotion. Condrey retired shortly thereafter.

=== Later career (2004–2011) ===
Condrey came back to team with Eaton in 2004, wrestling (along with Stan Lane) as the Midnight Express in the independents and feuding with the Rock 'n' Roll Express and The Fantastics.

He signed to World Wrestling Entertainment in March 2010 as a developmental trainer. He was assigned to Florida Championship Wrestling and worked with rookies on the NXT roster. Condrey retired in 2011, after wrestling his last match on October 15, against Bill Mulkey at the AWE Night of Legends.

== Death ==
Condrey died at his home in Huntsville, Alabama, on March 20, 2026, at the age of 76. According to Jim Cornette, Condrey died after suffering a fall and breaking his neck, severely injuring his spinal cord and paralyzing him from the chest down.

== Championships and accomplishments ==
- American Wrestling Association
  - AWA World Tag Team Championship (1 time) – with Randy Rose
- Continental Wrestling Federation
  - CWF Heavyweight Championship (1 time)
- Georgia Championship Wrestling
  - NWA Georgia Heavyweight Championship (1 time)
- International Championship Wrestling
  - ICW Tag Team Championship (1 time) – with Doug Gilbert
- International Wrestling Cartel
  - IWC Tag Team Championship (1 time) – with Bobby Eaton
- Jim Crockett Promotions
  - NWA World Tag Team Championship (Mid-Atlantic version) (1 time) – with Bobby Eaton
- Memphis Wrestling Hall of Fame
  - Class of 2017 - with Bobby Eaton and Stan Lane and Jim Cornette
- Mid-South Wrestling
  - Mid-South Tag Team Championship (2 times) – with Bobby Eaton
- National Wrestling Alliance
  - NWA Hall of Fame (class of 2008)
- NWA Bluegrass
  - NWA Bluegrass Tag Team Championship (1 time) – with Bobby Eaton
- NWA Mid-America / Continental Wrestling Association
  - NWA Southern Tag Team Championship (9 times) – with Phil Hickerson (5), Don Carson (1), David Schultz (1), and Randy Rose (2)
  - NWA Mid-America Heavyweight Championship (2 times)
  - NWA Mid-America Tag Team Championship (1 time) – with Phil Hickerson
  - NWA Six-Man Tag Team Championship (2 times) – with Al Greene & Phil Hickerson (1), and Tojo Yamamoto & Chris Colt (1)
  - NWA United States Tag Team Championship (Mid-America version) (5 times) – with Phil Hickerson
  - NWA World Brass Knuckles Championship (1 time)
- NWA Wrestle Birmingham
  - NWA Wrestle Birmingham Heavyweight Championship (1 time)
  - NWA Wrestle Birmingham Television Championship (1 time)
- Professional Wrestling Hall of Fame
  - Class of 2019 – Inducted as part of The Midnight Express with "Beautiful" Bobby Eaton and "Ravishing" Randy Rose
- Pro Wrestling Illustrated
  - PWI ranked him # 219 of the 500 best singles wrestlers during the "PWI Years" in 2003.
  - PWI ranked him # 21 of the 100 best tag teams during the "PWI Years" with Bobby Eaton in 2003.
- Southeastern Championship Wrestling
  - NWA Alabama Heavyweight Championship (2 times)
  - NWA Southeastern Heavyweight Championship (Northern Division) (1 time)
  - NWA Southeastern Tag Team Championship (15 times) – with Randy Rose (10), David Shultz (1), Don Carson (1), and Phil Hickerson (3)
- Windy City Pro Wrestling
  - WCPW Tag Team Championship (1 time) – with Randy Rose
- World Class Championship Wrestling
  - NWA American Tag Team Championship (1 time) – with Bobby Eaton
- World Wrestling Council
  - WWC North American Tag Team Championship (1 time) – with Dutch Mantel
- Wrestling Observer Newsletter
  - Tag Team of the Year (1986) with Bobby Eaton
  - Wrestling Observer Newsletter Hall of Fame (Class of 2009) with Bobby Eaton as the Midnight Express

== See also ==
- The Midnight Express
