= Ricky Morton =

American wrestler (born 1956)

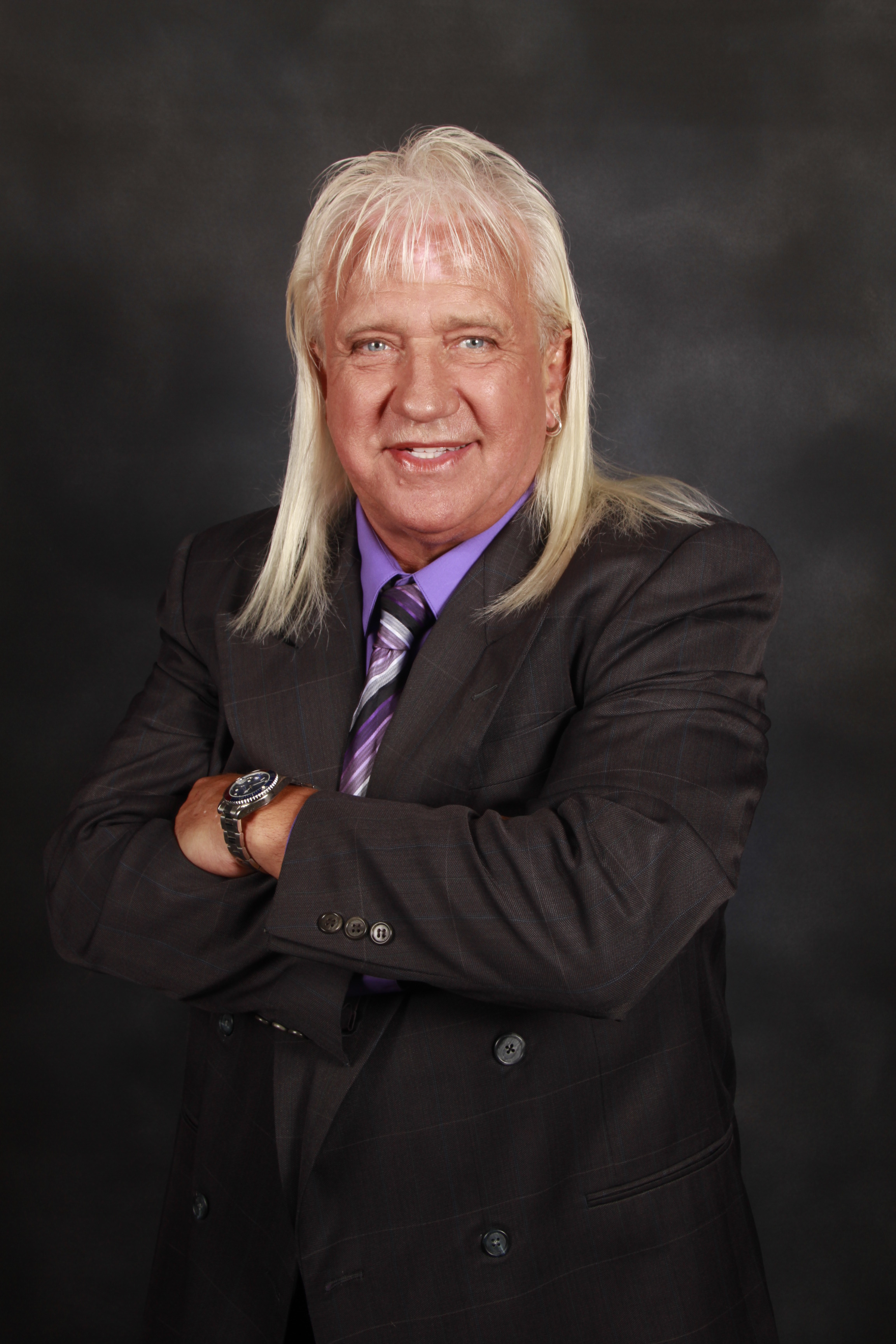
- Morton in 2015

Personal information
- Born: Richard Wendell Morton; September 21, 1956 (age 70) Nashville, Tennessee, U.S.
- Children: 7, including Kerry
- Family: Todd Morton (cousin)

Professional wrestling career
- Ring name(s): Richard Morton; Rick Morton; Ricky Morton
- Billed height: 5 ft 11 in (180 cm)
- Billed weight: 227 lb (103 kg)
- Billed from: "The Volunteer State of Tennessee"
- Trained by: Ken Lucas
- Debut: 1977

Richard Wendell Morton (born September 21, 1956) is an American professional wrestler who currently performs on the independent circuit. For most of his career, Morton has teamed with Robert Gibson as part of the Rock 'n' Roll Express, widely regarded as "the consummate babyface tag team". Morton has known for his time with numerous promotions in the United States including the Continental Wrestling Association, Mid-South Wrestling, Jim Crockett Promotions/World Championship Wrestling, Smoky Mountain Wrestling (SMW), the World Wrestling Federation (WWF) and Extreme Championship Wrestling (ECW). He also known for his time in the Japanese promotions All Japan Pro Wrestling (AJPW), New Japan Pro-Wrestling (NJPW) and Wrestle Association R (WAR).

Morton has held dozens of championships throughout his career, including the NWA World Junior Heavyweight Championship, NWA World Tag Team Championship, USWA Unified World Heavyweight Championship, USWA World Tag Team Championship, and WCW World Six-Man Tag Team Championship. He has been inducted into the NWA Hall of Fame, Wrestling Observer Newsletter Hall of Fame, and WWE Hall of Fame. Known for his ability to elicit sympathy from audiences by convincingly selling pain, Morton's technique gave rise to the expression "playing Ricky Morton".

== Professional wrestling career ==
=== Continental Wrestling Association (1977–1985) ===
Morton was trained by veteran wrestler Ken Lucas. He made his professional debut in 1977, facing Ken Wayne. He wrestled primarily for the Continental Wrestling Association in Memphis, Tennessee, often teaming with Lucas or Eddie Gilbert. Morton quickly became a popular performer due to his athleticism, charismatic appearance, and distinctive spiky blond mullet. His appeal to female fans earned him the label of "teen idol".

In early 1983, promoters Jerry Jarrett and Jerry Lawler paired Morton with Robert Gibson to form The Rock 'n' Roll Express, intended to replicate the success of The Fabulous Ones. The team won the Mid-South Tag Team Championship three times and began a feude with the team that would become their arch-rivals, The Midnight Express (Bobby Eaton and Dennis Condrey). Due to his small stature and appealing look, Morton was often designated the "face in peril", taking the majority of punishment in matches to elicit sympathy from fans. He also frequently endured humiliations or scripted injuries to advance storylines, a technique now sometimes as "Playing Ricky Morton". At this time, Morton and Gibson also competed in Joe Blanchard's Southwest Wrestling territory, feuding with The Grapplers.

In 1984, Morton participated in an angle with Randy Savage, in which Savage piledrove him through a table at ringside.

=== NWA Tri-State / Mid-South Wrestling (1981, 1984–1986, 1987) ===
In 1981, Morton began wrestling for NWA Tri-State, where he formed a successful tag team with Eddie Gilbert. The duo captured the NWA Tri-State Tag Team Championship on two occasions; Morton's second reign concluded in August 1981 upon his departure from the promotion.

By 1984, Morton had partnered with Gibson, and the pair began wrestling regularly for Mid-South Wrestling (the successor to NWA Tri-State). Known as the Rock 'n' Roll Express, they held the Mid-South Tag Team Championship three times that year, engaging in a high-profile rivalry with The Midnight Express. Their third and final reign ended in March 1985 following a loss to Steve Williams and Ted DiBiase. They remained with the promotion until June 1985.

Morton and Gibson returned to the promotion, by then renamed the Universal Wrestling Federation (UWF), in 1986. During the "Superdome Extravaganza" supercard held at the Louisiana Superdome in June 1986, Morton transitioned to singles competition for a marquee match, unsuccessfully challenging Ric Flair for the NWA World Heavyweight Championship.

=== Jim Crockett Promotions (1985–1988) ===
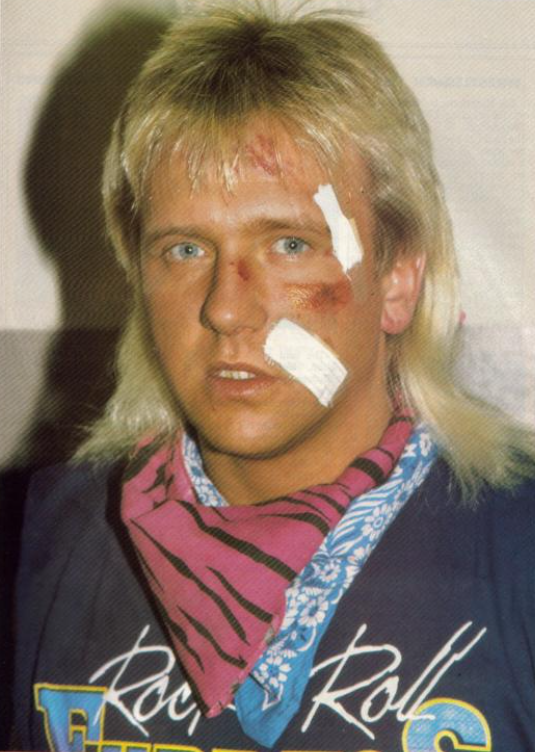
Morton, c. 1986

In 1985, both teams moved on to the National Wrestling Alliance's Jim Crockett Promotions and received the national television exposure of TBS. Ricky and Robert had a major feud with the "Russians", Ivan Koloff and Nikita Koloff, and won the NWA World Tag Team Title on July 9. They traded the title back and forth with the Russians before losing it to their rivals, the Midnight Express, on February 1, 1986, during Superstars on the Superstation. Their manager, Jim Cornette, had used his tennis racket on Robert to help his team win.

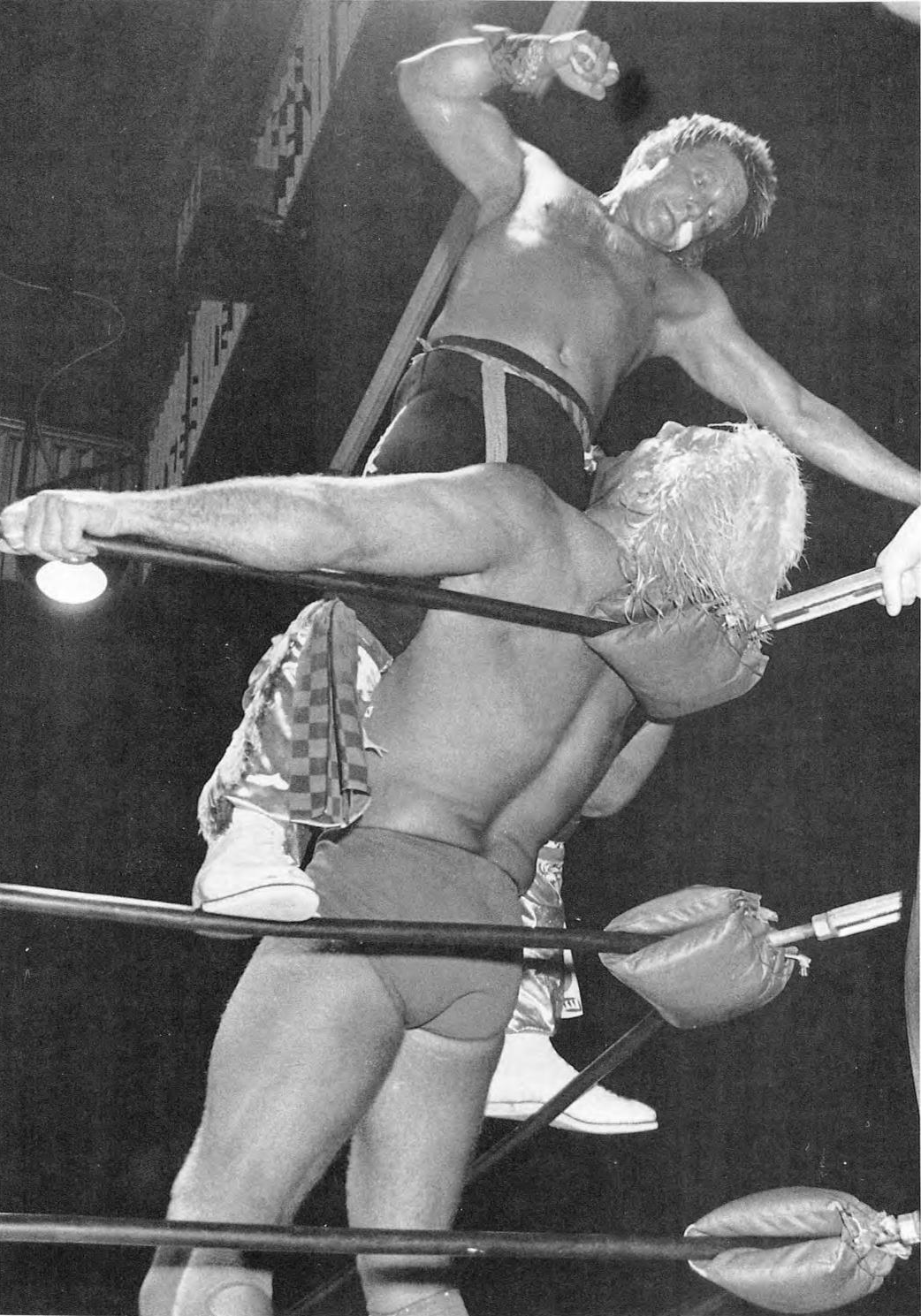
Morton (top) punches Ric Flair (bottom), circa 1986

Fearing that his self-proclaimed sex appeal with women was being threatened by Morton, NWA Champion Ric Flair began a feud with Morton in 1986. In the spring of that year, Morton was having an interview at ringside when Flair came onto the set and insulted Morton's fans (who consisted mostly of tween girls) by calling them "teenyboppers in their training bras." He gave Morton a training bra as a "gift from one of Flair's girlfriends" and told Morton that he couldn't handle real, grown-up women. In response, Morton stomped on Flair's sunglasses. This led to a fight and then a series of matches, the most notable being their Steel Cage match at the 1986 Great American Bash.

To help build Morton as a serious title contender, it was said that he once went to a one-hour draw with then-AWA Champion Nick Bockwinkel. Morton never won the title but he proved that he was of the same caliber as Flair was in the ring. Horsemen member Arn Anderson would also make fun of Morton, calling him "Punky Morton," which was a play on the popular 1980s sitcom Punky Brewster. The term used to belittle Morton backfired when fans began to use it as a term of endearment.

Morton and Gibson later won the title back from the Midnight Express and feuded with Ole Anderson and Arn Anderson for the rest of the year. They culminated this feud with a win over the Andersons in a cage match at Starrcade '86: The Skywalkers on November 28. This victory started the Horsemen's dissatisfaction with Ole, who was kicked out of the stable just months later. Morton and Gibson then lost the title to Rick Rude and Manny Fernandez on December 6, 1986, whom they feuded with from December 1986 to June 1987. When Rude left for the World Wrestling Federation, the title was given back to the Rock & Roll Express, with the explanation that they won the title accompanied by footage of a prior non-title match won by the Rock & Roll Express where they pinned the champions.

Morton and Gibson then feuded briefly with the New Breed, Sean Royal and Chris Champion, but this feud ended when the New Breed were injured in an auto accident. Their next feud was with Arn Anderson and Tully Blanchard, who won the title from them on September 29, 1987, after Jim Cornette's new Midnight Express of Bobby Eaton and Stan Lane attacked them and injured Morton's arm and shoulder. Morton came out in the middle of the match and blindly tagged Gibson and courageously tried to wrestle but the Horsemen soon took advantage and Gibson gave up the match to save Morton more pain. They feuded for a few months with the Horsemen keeping the titles by getting themselves disqualified, and injuring Gibson's ribs.

=== All Japan Pro Wrestling (1988) ===
In May 1988, Morton and Gibson toured Japan with All Japan Pro Wrestling, competing in the Super Power Series and facing teams including Samson Fuyuki and Toshiaki Kawada, Shinichi Nakano and Tiger Mask, and Isamu Teranishi and Masanobu Fuchi. They returned for a second tour in October 1988, this time competing in the October Giant Series. In the final match of their tour they unsuccessfully challenged Fuyuki and Kawada for the All Asia Tag Team Championship.

=== United States Wrestling Association (1989) ===
In 1989, Morton and Gibson went to United States Wrestling Association where they feuded with Wildside (Chris Champion and Mark Starr) and The Blackbirds, Iceman Parsons and Action Jackson. Later that year, he teamed with his cousin, Todd Morton and won the CWA Tag team titles.

=== World Championship Wrestling (1990–1993) ===
They returned to World Championship Wrestling in 1990. Gibson injured his knee and Morton teamed with Big Josh and Junkyard Dog to win the WCW World Six-Man Tag Team Championship.

On June 12, 1991, at Clash of the Champions XV, Morton was in the ring to accept an invitation by Alexandra York to join her York Foundation. Gibson appeared and said he was healthy and ready to go and Morton turned on Gibson and beat him down before leaving with York, Mr. Hughes and Terrence Taylor. He changed his name to Richard Morton and they soon added Tommy Rich, who became Thomas Rich. They feuded with Gibson, Dustin Rhodes and Bobby Eaton and won the WCW World Six-Man Tag Team Championship. At The Great American Bash in July 1991, Morton defeated Gibson. In October 1991 at Halloween Havoc, Morton lost to Flyin' Brian in a bout for the newly created WCW Light Heavyweight Championship.

They disbanded in early 1992 and Morton was used as a preliminary heel jobber where he teamed with various heels like Diamond Dallas Page. Morton made his last WCW TV appearance in a match against Barry Windham on July 18, 1992.

Morton and Gibson returned to World Championship Wrestling in January 1993 feuding with The Heavenly Bodies. They appeared at SuperBrawl III and defeated the Heavenly Bodies.

=== Smoky Mountain Wrestling (1992–1995) ===
In 1992, Morton joined Smoky Mountain Wrestling and reformed the Rock & Roll Express with Gibson on August 8, 1992, during a match in Johnson City, Tennessee. They went back and forth to the two promotions. They feuded with two versions of The Heavenly Bodies for the next year and a half, Stan Lane and Tom Prichard, and Prichard and Jimmy Del Ray. They feuded with The Gangstas (New Jack and Mustafa Saed) in 1994 and went to the NWA to win the Tag Team Championship again in 1995. During 1995 he also teamed briefly with David Jericho. Later that year, he reunited with Gibson and they feuded with PG-13. Both Morton and Gibson left USWA in 1996.

=== World Wrestling Federation (1993, 1994) ===
In 1993, Morton and Gibson debuted in the World Wrestling Federation on the September 27, 1993, episode of Monday Night Raw, defeating Barry Hardy and Duane Gill. Recognized on WWF television as the SMW Tag Team Champions, they went on to defend the championship in bouts on WWF All American Wrestling and WWF Superstars. At Survivor Series on November 24, 1993, they lost the championship to The Heavenly Bodies (Tom Prichard and Jimmy Del Ray), leaving the WWF thereafter.

Morton and Gibson briefly returned to the WWF in July 1994, joining the WWF Summer Fest tour of Germany and losing a series of matches to The Smoking Gunns.

=== Wrestle Association R (1993, 1994) ===
In July 1993, Morton and Gibson toured Japan with Wrestle Association R, facing Último Dragón and Yuji Yasuraoka in a series of bouts. They returned for a second tour in November 1994 as part of the WAR-ISM 1994 event, facing members of Fuyuki-gun on several occasions.

=== Return to WCW (1996) ===
Morton and Gibson returned to World Championship Wrestling on the June 3, 1996, episode of WCW Monday Nitro. They briefly feuded with The Four Horsemen. They remained with the promotion until October 1996.

=== Frontier Martial-Arts Wrestling (1996, 1997) ===
In May 1996, Morton and Gibson wrestled four bouts for the Japanese promotion Frontier Martial-Arts Wrestling (FMW). At the FMW 7th Anniversary Show in Kawasaki Stadium, Morton, Gibson and Ricky Fuji defeated Boogie Man, Crypt Keeper, and Freddy Krueger in a six-man tag team bout.

Morton returned for a second tour with FMW in April 1997, participating in the "Fighting Creation" tournament as part of a three-man team with Fuji and Hayabusa. At the FMW 8th Anniversary Show in Yokohama Arena, he and Fuji defeated Dragon Winger and Hido. Morton returned once more in August 1997, teaming with Fuji in the "Super Dynamism" tournament. During the tournament, Morton, Fuji, and Jinsei Shinzaki lost to Mr. Gannosuke, The Gladiator, and Super Leather in a "no ropes barbed wire street fight".

=== Extreme Championship Wrestling (1997) ===
Morton debuted in the Philadelphia, Pennsylvania-based promotion Extreme Championship Wrestling at ECW House Party 1997 on January 11, 1997. He teamed with Tommy Rich in a loss to The Gangstas; following the bout, Morton and Rich faced one another in an impromptu match that was won by Rich. He returned to ECW the following month at Crossing the Line Again, losing to Big Stevie Cool.

=== Return to WWF (1998) ===
In January 1998, both Ricky Morton and Robert Gibson returned to the World Wrestling Federation as part of the "NWA" angle as the NWA Tag Team Champions. They lost the titles to The Headbangers on February 17 episode of Raw Is War. They competed at WrestleMania XIV in the tag team battle royal won by The Legion of Doom. In the spring they feuded with the NWA World Tag Team Champions New Midnight Express Bodacious Bart and Bombastic Bob. This took them to their match at Unforgiven: In Your House which Gunn and Holly won.

=== Independent circuit (1998–2003) ===
After leaving WWF in May 1998, they went to work for Ohio Valley Wrestling and Power Pro Wrestling until 1999. Morton then appeared on Juggalo Championship Wrestling's JCW Vol. 1 in a battle royal.

On September 7, 2002, he defeated his former rival Bobby Eaton at Ultimate Championship wrestling.

=== NWA Total Nonstop Action (2003) ===
In 2003, they briefly were part of Vince Russo's S.E.X. group in Total Nonstop Action Wrestling (TNA). They feuded with America's Most Wanted. Morton lost to Kid Kash on July 30.

=== Late career (2003–present) ===
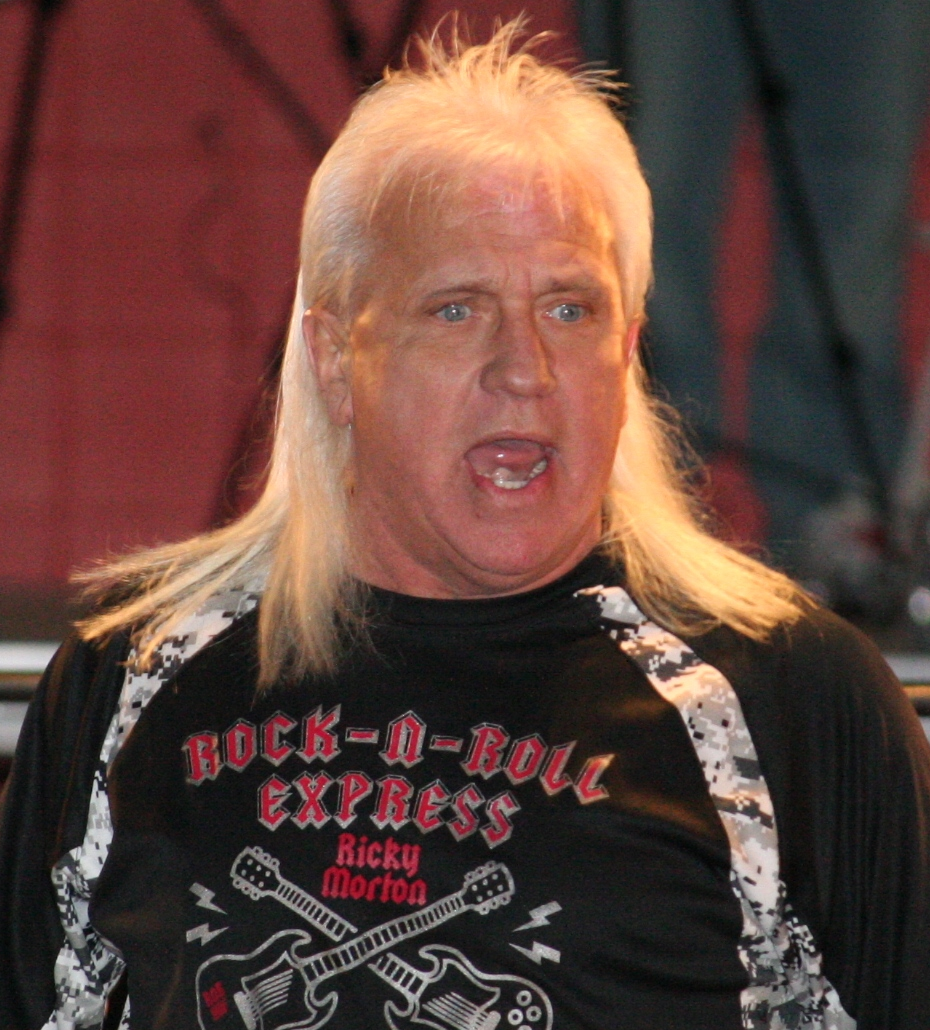
Morton in 2014.

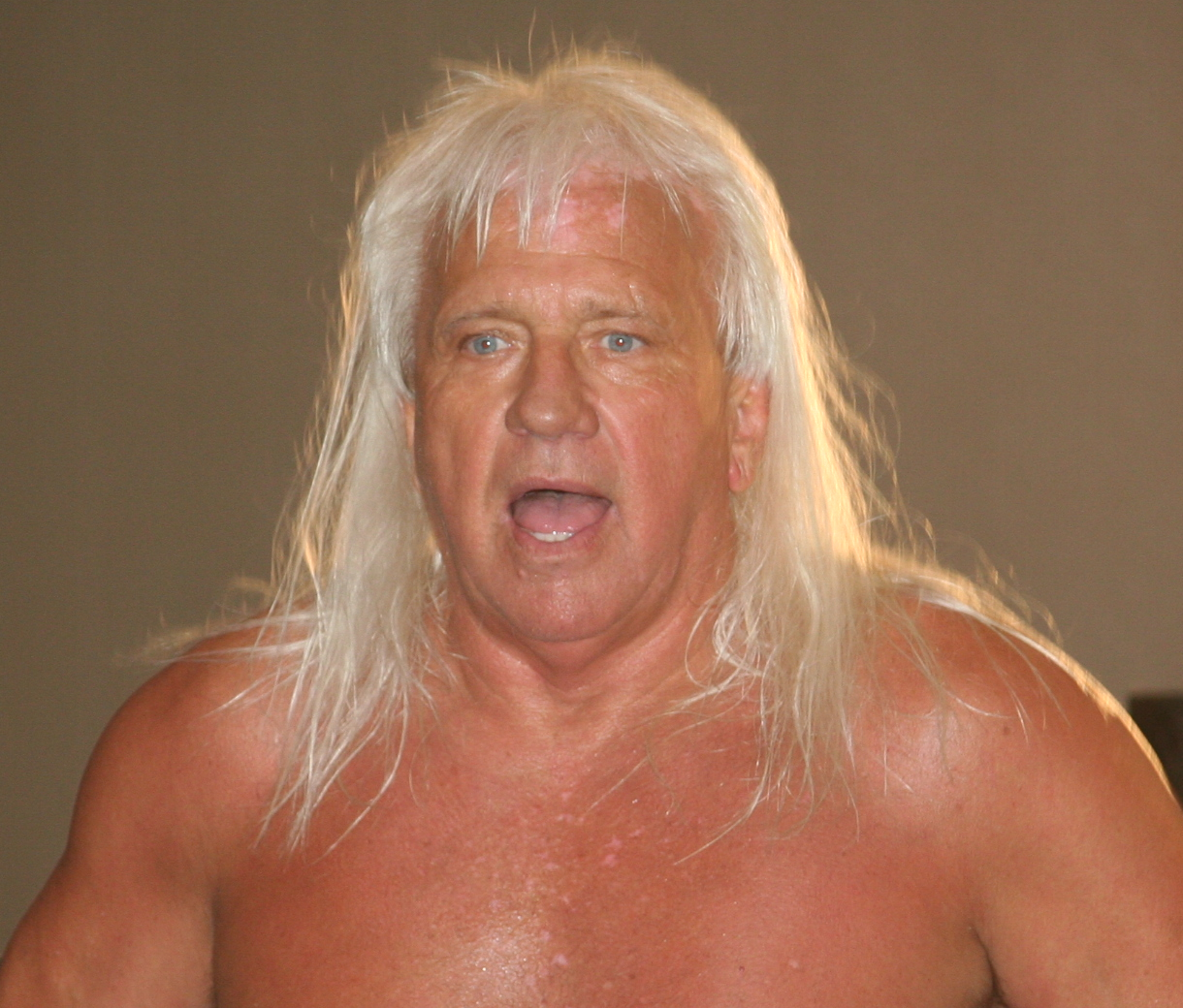
Morton in 2015.

Since leaving TNA, Morton has wrestled all over the independent circuit in the Southeast and on the East Coast and often wins regional titles. Occasionally, he teams with Gibson as the Rock 'N Roll Express. From 2003 to 2004, he, along with Robert Gibson, joined the All World Wrestling league and Big Time Wrestling. On March 31, 2007, in Logan, West Virginia, Morton defeated Bobby Eaton in an NWA Legends Match during ASW's Rumble In The Jungle show. On April 27, 2007, in Memphis, Tennessee, at the PMG Clash of Legends event put on by Memphis Wrestling, Morton and Kid Kash captured the MW Southern Tag Team Championship, defeating Too Cool II. On June 30, 2007, Ricky and Todd Morton, billed as the Rock & Roll Express, beat Big and Tasty (Sweet William Valentine and Playboy Mike Trusty) to win the AWA Supreme Tag Team titles. On October 24, 2007, The Rock & Roll Express lost the AWA Supreme Tag Team Titles to Chaos Theory (Khris Kaliber and Karma). On January 4, 2014, Morton defeated Chase Owens to win the NWA World Junior Heavyweight Championship. He re-lost the title to Owens on March 7.

In 2014, Morton opened a wrestling school, The School of Morton, in Chuckey, Tennessee. The School of Morton also operates a promotion called SOM Live, with a weekly web series SOM 5:05 Live.

In 2016, The Rock N' Roll Express made a special appearance as part of TNA's weekly televised program Impact Wrestling's Total Nonstop Deletion episode, where they took part in the Tag Team Apocalypto match along with other tag teams.

In 2017, The Rock N' Roll Express were inducted into the WWE Hall of Fame.

The team made their New Japan Pro-Wrestling debut during the Fighting Spirit Unleashed 2019 event, 3 events promoted by NJPW in the United States.

In 2019, Morton and Gibson wrestled three bouts for New Japan Pro-Wrestling and also appeared in All Elite Wrestling.

The Rock N Roll Express participated in the 2019 edition of the Jim Crockett Cup, but were defeated by The Briscoe Brothers in the first round. During the NWA television tapings on October 1, 2019, they won the NWA World Tag Team Championship. In January 2020, Morton entered a rivalry with Nick Aldis, leading to a Heavyweight Championship match on NWA Powerrr which Morton lost.

Morton continues to be an active wrestler on the independent circuit, averaging 28 matches per year since 2020, including matches for Game Changer Wrestling and Juggalo Championship Wrestling.

== Other media ==
Morton made his WWE video game debut as DLC for WWE 2K18 along with Robert Gibson.

== Personal life ==
Morton's cousin Todd Morton also wrestled, occasionally teaming with Morton.

Morton was arrested in October 2005 for failing to pay child support. Morton contended that the outstanding payments were due to the child support amount having been set when he was earning a significant income working for major promotions as a part of The Rock N' Roll Express, and failed to reflect the much lower amount he was able to earn on the independent circuit. At least two benefit shows were put together in February 2006 to raise money towards his legal fees. A United Wrestling Association show in Alcoa, Tennessee on February 2, 2006, raised $2,475 for this cause. On February 15, 2006, Morton was released under the condition that he continue working and making efforts to catch up on the delinquent payments owed to his ex-wife. He returned to the ring the next night for the United Wrestling Association. In September 2007, while camping with his children at a Tennessee park, Morton was rearrested on the same charges. It was estimated he owed a remaining balance of $63,000. A website was established, and raised enough funds to secure his bail.

Morton currently operates the School of Morton in Chuckey, Tennessee, where he serves as a trainer. He also still works the independent circuit and cameos in several films and videos.

== Championships and accomplishments ==
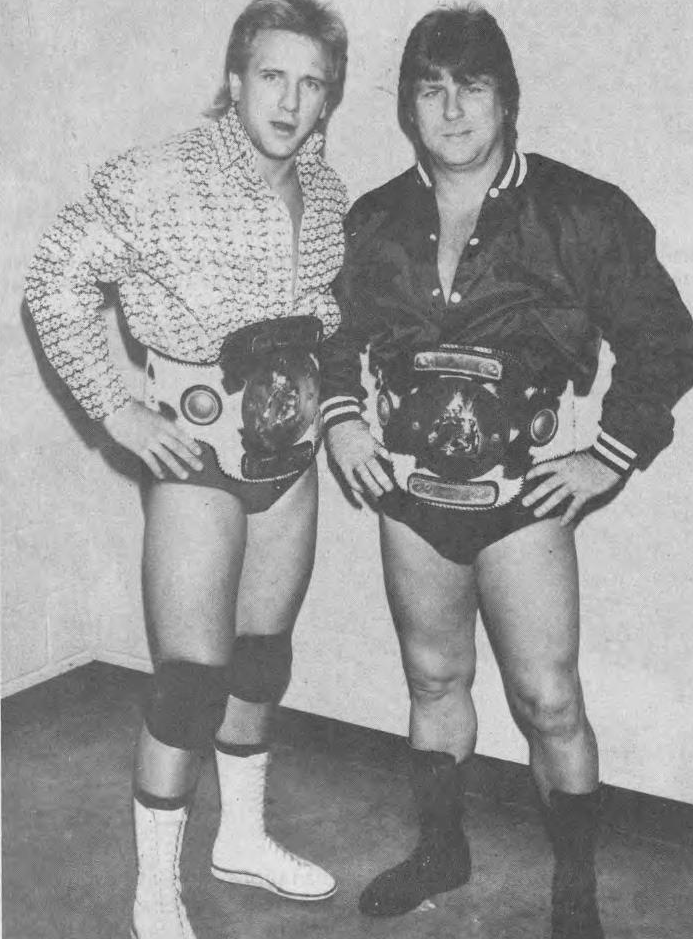
Morton (left) and Ken Lucas (right) as NWA Mid-America Tag Team Champions, c. 1983

- Appalachian Mountain Wrestling
  - AMW Tag Team Championship (2 times) - with Kerry Morton
- American Pro Wrestling
  - APW Heavyweight Championship (1 time)
- AWA Supreme
  - AWA Supreme Tag Team Championship (1 time) – with Todd Morton
- Appalachia Pro Wrestling
  - APW Heavyweight Championship (1 time)
- Carolina Wrestling Association
  - CWA Heavyweight Championship (1 time)
- Cauliflower Alley Club
  - Tag Team Award (2022) – with Robert Gibson
- Boca Raton Championship Wrestling
  - BRCW Heavyweight Championship (1 time)
- Championship Wrestling
  - CW Triple Crown Tag Team Championship (1 time) – with Wayne Adkins
- Continental Wrestling Association / Championship Wrestling Association
  - AWA Southern Tag Team Championship (8 times) – with Sonny King (1), with Ken Lucas (4), Eddie Gilbert (1), and Robert Gibson (2)
  - CWA Heavyweight Championship (1 time)
  - CWA Tag Team Championship (2 times) – with Robert Gibson (1), and Todd Morton (1)
  - CWA World Tag Team Championship (1 time) – with Robert Gibson
- Exodus Wrestling Alliance
  - EWA Heavyweight Championship (2 times)
- Extreme Wrestling Federation
  - EWF Heavyweight Championship (1 time)
  - EWF Tag Team Championship (1 time) – with Chris Hamrick
- Great American Wrestling Federation
  - GAWF Tag Team Championship (1 time) – with David Jericho
- Joe Cazana Promotions
  - JCP Tag Team Championship (1 time) – with Kerry Morton
- Jim Crockett Promotions / World Championship Wrestling
  - NWA World Tag Team Championship (Mid-Atlantic version) (4 times) – with Robert Gibson
  - WCW World Six-Man Tag Team Championship (2 times) – with Thomas Rich and Junkyard Dog (1), and Terrence Taylor and Thomas Rich (1)
- Juggalo Championship Wrestling
  - JCW Battle Royal Championship (1 time)
- Korean Pro-Wrestling Association
  - NWA World Tag Team Championship (1 time) – with Robert Gibson
- Memphis Wrestling
  - Memphis Wrestling Southern Tag Team Championship (1 time) – with Kid Kash
- Mid-South Wrestling
  - Mid-South Tag Team Championship (3 times) – with Robert Gibson
- Mid-South Wrestling Association
  - MSWA Tennessee Heavyweight Championship (1 time)
  - MSWA Southern Tag Team Championship (1 time) – with Robert Gibson
- National Wrestling Alliance
  - NWA World Junior Heavyweight Championship (1 time)
  - NWA World Tag Team Championship (4 times) – with Robert Gibson^{1}
  - NWA World Tag Team Championship Tournament (1995)
  - The Anderson Brothers Classic 5 Tournament (2011)
  - NWA Hall of Fame (Class of 2006)
- NWA Mid-America
  - NWA Mid-America Tag Team Championship (1 time) – with Ken Lucas
- NWA Mid Atlantic Championship Wrestling
  - MACW Tag Team Championship (4 times) – with Robert Gibson (3) and Brad Armstrong (1)
- NWA Rocky Top
  - NWA Rocky Top Tag Team Championship (1 time) – with Brad Armstrong
- NWA Smoky Mountain Wrestling
  - Smoky Mountain Cup (2013)
- NWA Southwest
  - NWA World Tag Team Championship (1 time) – with Robert Gibson
- NWA Tri-State
  - NWA Tri-State Tag Team Championship (2 times) – with Eddie Gilbert
- NWA Wildside
  - NWA Wildside Tag Team Championship (1 time) – with Robert Gibson
- North American Championship Wrestling
  - NACW Tag Team Championship (2 times) – with Buff Bagwell
- Omni Pro Wrestling
  - OPW Rock 'n' Roll Cup Tag Team Tournament (2006) – with Aaron Armor
- Peach State Wrestling
  - PSW Cordele City Heavyweight Championship (1 time)
- Pro Wrestling Illustrated
  - Tag Team of the Year (1986) – with Robert Gibson
  - Ranked No. 56 of the top 500 singles wrestlers in the PWI 500 in 1991
  - Ranked No. 95 of the top 500 singles wrestlers of the "PWI Years" in 2003
  - Ranked No. 4 of the Top 100 Tag Teams of the "PWI Years" with Robert Gibson in 2003
- Professional Wrestling Federation
  - PWF Heavyweight Championship (1 time)
- Professional Wrestling Hall of Fame and Museum
  - Class of 2021 – Inducted as a member of The Rock 'N' Roll Express
- Smoky Mountain Wrestling
  - SMW Tag Team Championship (10 times) – with Robert Gibson
- Southern States Wrestling
  - SSW Texas Heavyweight Championship (1 time)
  - SSW Tag Team Championship (3 times) – with Bobby Fulton (1), Beau James (1), and Ricky Harrison (1)
- Southwest Championship Wrestling
  - SCW Southwest Tag Team Championship (3 times) – with Ken Lucas (2) and Eddie Gilbert (1)
- Supreme Championship Wrestling
  - SCW Hall of Fame (Class of 2009)
- Traditional Championship Wrestling
  - TCW World Tag Team Championship (2 time) – with Dustin Heritage (1) and Robert Gibson (1)
- Ultimate Championship Wrestling
  - UCW Heavyweight Championship (2 times)
  - UCW Tag Team Championship (1 time) – with Robert Gibson
- United States Wrestling Association
  - USWA Unified World Heavyweight Championship (1 time)
  - USWA World Tag Team Championship (2 times) – with Robert Gibson
- United Wrestling Association
  - UWA Texas Heavyweight Championship (1 time)
- UPW Pro Wrestling
  - UPW Tag Team Championship (1 time)– with Robert Gibson
- Viral Pro Wrestling
  - VPW Tag Team Championship (2 times) – with Robert Gibson
- World Class Professional Big Time Wrestling
  - WCPBTW Ohio State Tag Team Championship (1 time) – with Tommy Rich
- Wrestling Observer Newsletter
  - Wrestling Observer Newsletter Hall of Fame (Class of 2014) – with Robert Gibson
- WWE
  - WWE Hall of Fame (Class of 2017 — with Robert Gibson)
