= Superstars on the Superstation =

US television special

- Promotion: Jim Crockett Promotions
- Date: February 2, 1986 (aired February 7, 1986)
- City: Atlanta, Georgia
- Venue: Omni
- Attendance: 10,000

Superstars on the Superstation was a televised professional wrestling event, presented by Jim Crockett Promotions, filmed in advance at the Omni in Atlanta, Georgia, airing on TBS on February 7, 1986. The event drew 10,000 fans to the Omni, while the broadcast had a Nielsen ratings of 3.2.

The event also featured several celebrities. Singer Willie Nelson, NASCAR legend Benny Parsons and Major League Baseball pitcher Gaylord Perry were all interviewed during the broadcast, with Nelson cutting a promo with Dusty Rhodes.

In August 2019 it was announced that Superstars on the Superstation would be uploaded to the WWE Network as a Hidden Gem.

== Background ==
The premise behind the show was that fans could vote for four, "dream matches" of their choice. Three of the bouts were dark matches, but the final four matches were televised, three of which saw National Wrestling Alliance (NWA) titles defended.

== Event ==
The first match of the broadcast saw the NWA World Tag Team Championship changed hands as Bobby Eaton of The Midnight Express pinned Ricky Morton of The Rock 'n' Roll Express to win the title. The ending to the match was controversial, however, as Eaton's partner, Dennis Condrey, hit Morton with a tennis racket to enable Eaton to score the pinfall.

The second match ended in a disqualification when Baron von Raschke and Krusher Khruschev interfered on behalf of Ivan Koloff and Nikita Koloff to attack The Road Warriors (Hawk and Animal).

Dusty Rhodes next successfully defended his NWA National Heavyweight Championship against Tully Blanchard when the match ended in a 20-minute time limit draw. After the match, Rhodes argued with Blanchard's manager, J. J. Dillon, which allowed Blanchard to attack Rhodes from behind. Despite not winning the title belt, Blanchard took it with him as he left the ring.

Next, Jim Crockett, Jr. announced that the first Crockett Cup would take place later that year; this led to an interview with Bob Johnson, executive vice president of the Louisiana Superdome, where the tournament would be held.

In the final match, scheduled for television time remaining, saw Ric Flair defeat Ron Garvin to retain the NWA World Heavyweight Championship when the referee did not notice that Garvin's foot was on the bottom rope, which should have invalidated the pinfall.

== Results ==
No.	Results	Stipulations	Times
1^{D}	Ron Bass vs. The Barbarian ended in a draw	Singles match	15:00
2^{D}	Baron von Raschke defeated The Italian Stallion	Singles match	7:01
3^{D}	Jimmy Valiant defeated Arn Anderson by disqualification	Singles match	12:46
4	The Midnight Express (Bobby Eaton and Dennis Condrey) (with Jim Cornette) defeated The Rock 'n' Roll Express (Ricky Morton and Robert Gibson) (c)	Tag team match for the NWA World Tag Team Championship	16:27
5	The Road Warriors (Hawk and Animal) (with Paul Ellering) defeated Ivan Koloff and Nikita Koloff by disqualification	Tag team match	06:55
6	Dusty Rhodes (c) (with Baby Doll) vs. Tully Blanchard (with J. J. Dillon) ended in a time limit draw	Singles match for the NWA National Heavyweight Championship	20:00
7	Ric Flair (c) defeated Ron Garvin	Singles match for the NWA World Heavyweight Championship	14:33
(c) / – the champion(s) heading into the match; D / – this was a dark match
