= USWA Junior Heavyweight Championship =

Professional wrestling championship

Details
- Promotion: United States Wrestling Association
- Date established: March 2, 1990
- Date retired: 1991, 1994
Statistics
- First champion(s): Ken Wayne
- Most reigns: Danny Davis (7 reigns)
- Longest reign: Ken Wayne (269 days)
- Shortest reign: Masaru Toi, Bill Dundee, Danny Davis (7 days)

The USWA Junior Heavyweight Championship was a short-lived title in the United States Wrestling Association that lasted from 1990 to 1991. They used the old NWA Southeastern United States Junior Heavyweight Championship belt to represent the title.

== Title history ==
Key
No.	Overall reign number
Reign	Reign number for the specific champion
Days	Number of days held

No.	Champion	Championship change			Reign statistics		Notes	Ref.
No.	Champion	Date	Event	Location	Reign	Days	Notes	Ref.
1	Ken Wayne	March 2, 1990	N/A	Unknown	1	269	Billed as a champion without an explanation of how he became champion	
2	Danny Davis	November 26, 1990	USWA show	Memphis, Tennessee	1	22		
3	Joey Maggs	December 8, 1990	USWA show	N/A	1	25	Possibly on December 12, 1990.	
4	Danny Davis	January 2, 1991	USWA show	Memphis, Tennessee	2	65		
5	El Grande Pistolero	March 8, 1991	USWA show	Dallas, Texas	1	46		
6	Danny Davis	April 23, 1991	USWA show	Louisville, Kentucky	3	104		
7	Bill Dundee	August 5, 1991	USWA show	Memphis, Tennessee	1	7		
8	Danny Davis	August 12, 1991	USWA show	Memphis, Tennessee	4	7		
9	Bill Dundee	August 19, 1991	USWA show	Memphis, Tennessee	2	14		
10	Danny Davis	September 2, 1991	USWA show	Memphis, Tennessee	5	10		
11	Masaru Toi	September 12, 1991	USWA show	Yokkaichi, Mie, Japan	1	7		
12	Danny Davis	September 19, 1991	USWA show	Tokyo, Japan	6	(Note: The exact date the championship was vacated is unknown, placing the reign at between 73 and 103 days.)		
—	Vacated	November 2, 1991	—	—	—	—	Vacated for undocumented reasons	
13	Danny Davis	March 3, 1993	USWA show	N/A	7	(Note: The length of the championship reign is too uncertain to calculate.)		
—	Deactivated	February 4, 1994	—	—	—	—	Championship abandoned by the USWA.	
