= National Wrestling Alliance (stable) =

Professional wrestling stable

Stable
- Members: See below
- Debut: December 30, 1997
- Disbanded: August 14, 1998
- Years active: 1997–1998

The National Wrestling Alliance (NWA) was a professional wrestling stable that competed in the World Wrestling Federation (WWF) in 1997 and 1998. Based on the actual National Wrestling Alliance (NWA) organization, an international wrestling governing body, it was led by Jim Cornette. Most members of the stable were alumni of Jim Crockett Promotions, once a prominent member of the NWA before selling most assets to Turner Broadcasting and being relaunched as World Championship Wrestling (WCW).

== History ==
After months of promos in which he denigrated both the WWF and WCW, on December 30, 1997 (aired January 5, 1998), Jim Cornette brought NWA promoters and officials Howard Brody and Dennis Coralluzzo to WWF Raw is War and made a match between Jeff Jarrett and Barry Windham for the vacant NWA North American Championship, formerly administered by Championship Wrestling America in New Jersey. Jarrett defeated Windham to win the title after Cornette interfered. On January 12, 1998, The Rock 'n' Roll Express debuted and joined Cornette and Jarrett. The Rock 'n' Roll Express were awarded the NWA World Tag Team Championship and successfully defended the titles from The Disciples of Apocalypse by losing by disqualification on the January 12 Raw. At the 1998 Royal Rumble, Jarrett entered the Royal Rumble match at #18, but was eliminated a minute later by Owen Hart. The following night on the January 19 episode of Raw, Jarrett successfully defended the North American Championship against Blackjack Bradshaw. After the match, Blackjack Windham turned on Bradshaw and joined the NWA.

By February 1998, Jarrett and Windham began to feud with Bradshaw, while The Rock 'n' Roll Express began to feud with The Headbangers. At No Way Out, Bradshaw defeated Jarrett by disqualification. Two days later, on February 17, The Rock 'n' Roll Express lost the NWA World Tag Team Championship to The Headbangers. In March, the NWA lineup changed as Jarrett left the group on March 2 and reverted to his "Double J" persona and vacated the North American Championship. Cornette then awarded the vacated title to Windham, but the NWA organization stripped Windham of the belt just one day later. On March 17, 1998, after The Rock 'n' Roll Express failed to win the NWA Tag Team Championship from The Headbangers, they were kicked out of the stable after Cornette's new team, The Midnight Express (Bombastic Bob and Bodacious Bart) attacked them. At WrestleMania XIV, the Midnight Express appeared in the 15 team battle royals and were the last team to be eliminated. Barry Windham also appeared during the match and eliminated Bradshaw's partner, Chainz, thus costing Bradshaw the match. The following night on the March 30 episode of Raw, The Midnight Express defeated the Headbangers to win the NWA World Tag Team Championship. After the match, NWA World Heavyweight Champion Dan Severn debuted and joined the NWA by attacking the Headbangers.

After winning the NWA titles, The Midnight Express feuded with The Rock 'n' Roll Express over the titles throughout April with the Midnight Express coming out on top in every encounter, most notably at Unforgiven: In Your House. By May, the group began to shrink as Barry Windham left the WWF for WCW and Severn departed the group to be a singles competitor in the WWF. The NWA's last notable appearance occurred at the King of the Ring where they challenged The New Age Outlaws for the WWF Tag Team Championship, but lost. On August 14, 1998, the Midnight Express lost the NWA World Tag Team Championship to The Border Patrol at an NWA event. After the title loss, Cornette broke the NWA stable up on orders from WWF owner Vince McMahon, who told Cornette that he was banning anymore NWA matches from taking place on his shows.

== Members ==
| L | Leader(s) |
| * | Founding member(s) |

| Members | Joined | Left |
|---|---|---|
| Jim Cornette (L) | December 30, 1997 * | August 14, 1998 |
| Jeff Jarrett | December 30, 1997 * | March 2, 1998 |
| Ricky Morton | January 12, 1998 | March 17, 1998 |
| Robert Gibson | January 12, 1998 | March 17, 1998 |
| Barry Windham | January 19, 1998 | May 16, 1998 |
| Bombastic Bob | March 17, 1998 | August 14, 1998 |
| Bodacious Bart | March 17, 1998 | August 14, 1998 |
| Dan Severn | March 30, 1998 | April 14, 1998 |

=== Incarnations ===
- First incarnation (heel): National Wrestling Alliance
  - Type: stable
  - Active: December 30, 1997 – March 17, 1998
  - Members: Jim Cornette (leader), Jeff Jarrett, Ricky Morton, Robert Gibson, Barry Windham
- Second incarnation (heel): National Wrestling Alliance
  - Type: stable
  - Active: March 17, 1998 – August 14, 1998
  - Members: Jim Cornette (leader), Barry Windham, Bombastic Bob, Bodacious Bart, Dan Severn

== Championships and accomplishments ==
- World Wrestling Federation
  - NWA North American Championship (2 times) – Jeff Jarrett (1) and Barry Windham (1)
  - NWA World Heavyweight Championship (1 time) – Dan Severn
  - NWA World Tag Team Championship (2 times) – The Rock 'n' Roll Express (1) and The Midnight Express (1)
