= The Midnight Express (professional wrestling) =

Professional wrestling tag team

Stable
- Name(s): The Midnight Express; Midnight Express Incorporated; The Original Midnight Express
- Members: Dennis Condrey; Randy Rose; Norvell Austin; Ron Starr; Bobby Eaton; Stan Lane; Wendi Richter; Bob Holly; Bart Gunn; Rikki Nelson; Jeff Collett
- Manager(s): Jimmy Hart; Jim Cornette; Paul E. Dangerously
- Hometown: Dark Side
- Debut: 1980
- Disbanded: 2011

The Midnight Express was the name used by several professional wrestling tag teams of changing members, usually under the management of Jim Cornette. The group started in 1980 with Dennis Condrey and Randy Rose in Southeast Championship Wrestling. In 1981 they were joined by Norvell Austin. This group disbanded in 1983, but later the same year a new version of the Midnight Express was formed in Mid-South Wrestling by teaming up Condrey and Bobby Eaton, with Cornette as their manager. After leaving Mid-South, the Midnight Express competed briefly in WCCW (Dallas) before moving on to Jim Crockett Promotions (JCP). Condrey left in 1987, and was replaced by Stan Lane. Eaton and Lane (still managed by Cornette) competed in JCP and WCW, where they briefly feuded with "The Original Midnight Express" of Condrey and Rose (managed by Paul E. Dangerously). This version of the Midnight Express disbanded in October 1990 when Cornette and Lane left WCW. In 1998, the World Wrestling Federation (WWF) teamed up Bob Holly and Bart Gunn as "The Midnight Express", who were also managed by Jim Cornette. From 2004 until 2011 various combinations of Condrey, Eaton, and Lane competed as The Midnight Express on the independent circuit.

== History ==
=== Dennis Condrey, Randy Rose and Norvell Austin (1980–1983) ===
In 1980 a new team was formed in Southeast Championship Wrestling consisting of Dennis Condrey and Randy Rose. Norvell Austin adopted the masked persona of "The Shadow" and teamed with Brad Armstrong to defeat Condrey and Rose for the title on May 4, 1981. After losing the title back to Condrey and Rose on July 27, 1981, Austin turned on Armstrong and joined up with Condrey and Rose to form a stable (group) known as The Midnight Express. In the book The Pro Wrestling Hall of Fame: The Tag Teams Condrey explains that the name did not stem from the movie Midnight Express (although later versions of the Midnight Express would use the film's theme by Giorgio Moroder, or a cover version, as their theme music), but from the fact that they all dressed in black, drove black cars, and were out partying past midnight.

Together the three men won the AWA Southern Tag Team title in the CWA and invoked the "Freebird Rule" to allow any two of the three men to defend the titles on a given night. The Midnight Express lost the AWA Southern tag team title to Bobby Eaton and Sweet Brown Sugar before returning to SECW in the spring of 1982. Upon their return to Southeastern Championship Wrestling the Midnight Express quickly regained the Southeastern Tag Team title from Robert Fuller and Jimmy Golden on September 27, 1982. The Express then became involved in a feud with the Mongolian Stomper and his storyline son "Mongolian Stomper Jr.", with whom they traded the Southeastern title. The Midnight Express's next challengers were "Dizzy Ed" Hogan and local wrestler Ken Lucas. The two teams repeatedly traded the title until the Midnight Express, using their 3-on-2 advantage, finally reclaimed the championship by the end of July 1983. The Midnight Express's final feud in the SECW was with the local heroes Jimmy Golden and Robert Fuller, who managed to drive the group out of SECW. After dropping the Southeastern Tag Team Championship to Brad and Scott Armstrong, Austin, Condrey and Rose went their separate ways.

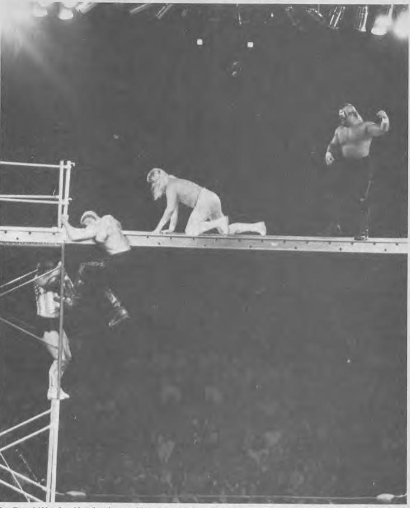
Scaffold match between the Midnight Express and the Road Warriors at Starrcade '86: The Skywalkers

=== Dennis Condrey and Bobby Eaton (1983–1987) ===
When Bobby Eaton was sent to Mid-South Wrestling under promoter Bill Watts as part of a talent trade it was decided that he should be part of the new version of the Midnight Express. Eaton joined with former rival Dennis Condrey under the management of Jim Cornette in this incarnation of the team. The Express had until this point been a group of wrestlers, but now worked exclusively as a two-man team. To complement "Loverboy" Dennis Condrey, Eaton was nicknamed "Beautiful Bobby", a nickname he continued using. The Express was first booked in a storyline with the Mid-South Tag Team champions Magnum T. A. and Mr. Wrestling II. The highlight of the angle saw Eaton and Condrey tarring and feathering Magnum T. A. in the middle of the ring. Condrey and Eaton won their first tag team championship when Mr. Wrestling II turned on Magnum T. A. and attacked him during a match, allowing The Midnight Express to walk away with the titles without much opposition. Collectively Dennis Condrey and Bobby Eaton held 53 tag team titles, setting the record in all of professional wrestling. During the Midnight's Express time in Mid-South, Wendi Richter was made an honorary member by Jim Cornette.

With Mr. Wrestling II and Magnum T. A. splitting up, the Midnight Express needed a new team to defend their newly won title against. This team was the Rock 'n' Roll Express (Ricky Morton and Robert Gibson), with whom they started a long-running series of matches that would last well into the 1990s and span several wrestling promotions. The two Expresses had a series of matches which differed from the way tag team wrestling was presented at the time and drew attention both locally and nationally. The two teams feuded throughout 1984 in Mid-South Wrestling before the Midnight Express left the promotion to work elsewhere.

The Midnight Express had a short stay in World Class Championship Wrestling in Texas where they feuded mainly with The Fantastics (Bobby Fulton and Tommy Rogers). When opportunities in WCCW looked to go nowhere the Midnight Express signed with Jim Crockett Promotions (JCP) in 1985, giving them national exposure through JCP's television shows that were broadcast on SuperStation TBS. Shortly after joining JCP, the Midnight Express reignited their feud with the Rock 'n' Roll Express from whom they won the NWA World Tag team titles in February 1986 on Superstars on the Superstation. Eaton and Condrey lost the titles back to the Rock 'n' Roll Express six months later. Besides feuding with the Rock 'n' Roll Express, Eaton and Condrey also had long-running feuds with The New Breed (Chris Champion and Sean Royal) as well as The Road Warriors (Animal and Hawk). The feud with the Road Warriors included a high-profile Scaffold Match at Starrcade '86: The Skywalkers, which the Midnight Express lost and where Jim Cornette famously hurt his knee when he fell off the scaffold.

=== Reformation with Bobby Eaton and Stan Lane (1987–1988) ===
In March 1987, Dennis Condrey suddenly left JCP without giving any reason, leaving Eaton without a partner. Bubba Rogers worked a few dates to fulfill obligations, but Dusty Rhodes made the decision to pick Stan Lane who was a singles star in Florida at the time. Tom Prichard was thought about, but never officially suggested.

Eaton and Lane reached the semi-finals of the Crockett Cup Tag Team Tournament on April 11, 1987, in Baltimore. On May 16, 1987, the combination of Eaton and Lane won the NWA United States Tag team titles for the first time, a title they would win three times during their time together. A year later the team was cheered on despite being heels as they won the NWA World Tag Team Titles from the Horsemen Arn Anderson and Tully Blanchard on September 10, 1988 (Anderson and Blanchard left NWA to go to World Wrestling Federation). The Midnight Express's title run only lasted a little over a month and a half before the Road Warriors (who had recently turned heel on Sting) took the gold from them in a brutal match.

=== Feud of the Midnight Expresses (1988–1989) ===
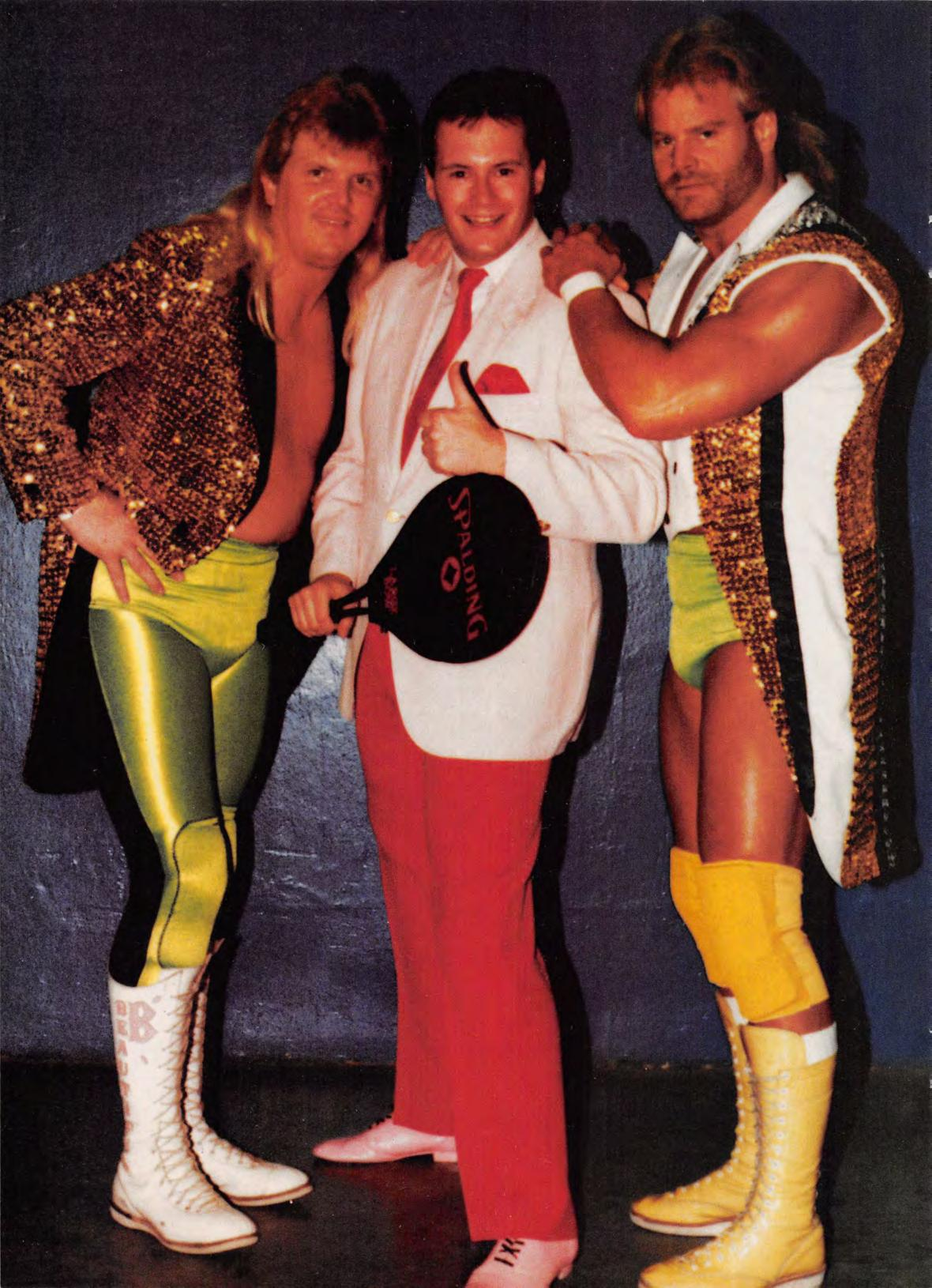
Eaton, Cornette and Lane in 1988

Meanwhile, Condrey eventually signed a contract to wrestle for the AWA, which at the time was recording television in Las Vegas; Condrey was living in Denver, Colorado at the time. He reconnected with former Midnight Express member Randy Rose and the two began teaming as the Midnight Express under the management of Paul E. Dangerously. The unit won the AWA World Tag Team Championship in October 1987 after defeating Jerry Lawler and Bill Dundee, then “lost” the titles to The Midnight Rockers in December. In reality, Condrey and AWA owner Verne Gagne were in a dispute over money owed to Condrey and he, Rose, and Dangerously all left the promotion in early 1988 while still being promoted as champions; the AWA decided to retroactively declare the Midnights/Rockers match in December to be a title change in favor of the latter.

About a year later, on an episode of World Championship Wrestling, Cornette received an on-air phone call from someone who was claiming to be anonymous; Cornette recognized the man’s voice and challenged him to come out and speak his peace to his face. The man turned out to be Paul E. Dangerously, and he, Condrey, and Rose came out and attacked Cornette and Lane during a singles match featuring the latter. This began one of the most anticipated feuds in the tag team division, with Eaton and Lane facing off against Condrey and Rose.

Despite the success the feud had generated early on, the battle between the Midnight Express and the Original Midnight Express eventually petered out. Cornette contended in a shoot interview that backstage politics and animosity between the Original Midnights, promotion head Jim Crockett and head booker George Scott led to the feud being cooled off.

=== The Midnight Express in WCW (1989–1990) ===
Due to various differences over the direction of the Midnight Express, Cornette, Lane, and Eaton also left JCP briefly, a few months after Ted Turner purchased the company and it was renamed World Championship Wrestling (WCW). When the issues were resolved, Cornette and the Midnight Express returned to the promotion. In the tournament to determine new World tag team champions, the Midnight Express advanced to the finals before losing to the Freebirds with some assistance from the Samoan Swat Team. They engaged in a feud with the Freebirds and Samoans until the 1989 Great American Bash, where they teamed up with the Road Warriors and Dr. Death Steve Williams to defeat the Freebirds and Samoans in a War Games match.

The Midnight Express soon turned heel as a result of a feud with the Dynamic Dudes (Johnny Ace and Shane Douglas). Jim Cornette duped the Dudes into thinking he wanted to be their manager but then turned on them during their match against the Midnight Express at Clash of the Champions IX in New York. The Dynamic Dudes gained a measure of revenge when the Midnight Express laid out an open challenge for any team for $10,000. After dispatching of a couple of no-name teams, the Express was challenged by the masked Dynamic Duo, billed from Gotham City, who pinned the Express and unmasked as Ace and Douglas. The feud soon lost steam and was forgotten soon after.

After returning to their cheating ways, the Midnight Express started a feud with the up-and-coming team of Flyin' Brian and "Z-Man" Tom Zenk over the United States Tag team titles. The Express won the titles from the young team in early 1990, but lost them to The Steiner Brothers (Rick and Scott) three months later. They were then defeated at Halloween Havoc 1990 by Tommy Rich and Ricky Morton.

On October 29, 1990, the Express showed up to the World Wide Wrestling TV tapings in Anderson, South Carolina, only to discover they were not on the card for any of the shows. Since they were not told ahead of time, Eaton was unable to take the day off to spend time with his wife and children. Cornette, already frustrated over what he perceived as the burial of Lane and Eaton by WCW President Jim Herd, discovered the next day that the Express was booked for four matches at the October 30 World Championship Wrestling TV tapings in Atlanta, Georgia, and they were to lose all of them. After confronting Ole Anderson, the booker at the time, over the scheduling, Cornette was told to "go home" if he disagreed. Calling Anderson's bluff, Cornette walked out of the room and told Lane he was leaving for good. Lane decided that he was going to quit as well, and after they said goodbye to Eaton (who decided to stay due to his family obligations), both men left and began heading north toward Charlotte, North Carolina; it was not until Anderson came looking for Cornette and Lane later that he realized they had quit after questioning Eaton of their whereabouts. So, for the first time in almost a decade, there was no Midnight Express.

=== Bart Gunn and Bob Holly (1998) ===
The Midnight Express name was resurrected by the World Wrestling Federation (WWF) in March 1998, when they put a combination of Bob Holly (as "Bombastic Bob") and Bart Gunn (as "Bodacious Bart") together as "The Midnight Express" with Cornette as their manager—all as part of the "NWA invasion" angle. On March 30, 1998, they won the NWA World Tag Team Championship from The Headbangers, but did not achieve much more success in the WWF. Despite the name "Midnight Express" and having Cornette in their corner, in shoot interviews Cornette has indicated that he never considered the team as continuing the lineage of the Midnight Express. They feuded with the Rock 'n' Roll Express. In July 1998, they disbanded.

=== Midnight Express reunited (2004–2011) ===
In 2003, Eaton worked for NWA Mid-Atlantic forming a new version of the Midnight Express with Rikki Nelson. This version was short-lived as Eaton soon started working independent wrestling cards with Dennis Condrey, sometimes with Lane and Cornette as well. Often they would be booked in matches against old rivals the Rock 'n' Roll Express, including the NWA 60th Anniversary Show in Atlanta, Georgia on June 7, 2008, and their final match at JCW's "Legends & Icons" show in August 2011.

== Members ==
=== Wrestlers ===
- Dennis Condrey (1980–1989, 2004–2011)
- Randy Rose (1980–1983, 1987–1989, 2004–2006)
- Norvell Austin (1981–1983, 2004)
- Ron Starr (1983)
- Honky Tonk Man (1983)
- Bobby Eaton (1983–1990, 2002–2011)
- Stan Lane (1987–1990, 2005–2010)
- Bart Gunn (1998)
- Bob Holly (1998)
- Rikki Nelson (2002–2005)
- Jeff Collett (Early 90's, VWA)

=== Managers ===
- Jim Cornette (1983–1990, 1998, 2004–2010)
- Paul E. Dangerously (1987–1989)

== Championships and accomplishments ==
- National Wrestling Alliance
  - NWA Hall of Fame (class of 2007)

=== Austin and Condrey ===
- Continental Wrestling Association
  - CWA World Tag Team Championship (1 time)

=== Austin and Rose ===
- NWA Southeastern Championship Wrestling
  - NWA Southeastern Tag Team Championship(Southern Division) (1 time)

=== Condrey and Eaton ===
- All-Star Wrestling (Virginia)
  - ASW Tag Team Championship (7 time)
- International Wrestling Cartel
  - IWC Tag Team Championship (10 time)
- Jim Crockett Promotions
  - NWA World Tag Team Championship (1 time)
- Mid-South Wrestling
  - Mid-South Tag Team Championship (2 times)
- NWA Bluegrass
  - NWA Bluegrass Tag Team Championship (10 times)
- NWA Rocky Top
  - NWA Rocky Top Tag Team Championship (19 times)
- NWA East Tennessee
  - NWA East Tennessee Tag Team Championship (1 time)
- Pro Wrestling Illustrated
  - PWI ranked them #21 of the 100 best tag teams during the "PWI Years" in 2003
- Universal Championship Wrestling
  - UCW Tag Team Championship (2 times)
- Professional Wrestling Hall of Fame
  - Class of 2019 - Inducted with "Ravishing" Randy Rose
- World Class Championship Wrestling
  - NWA American Tag Team Championship (1 time)
- Wrestling Observer Newsletter awards
  - Tag Team of the Year (1986)

=== Condrey and Rose ===
- American Wrestling Association
  - AWA World Tag Team Championship (1 time)
- Continental Wrestling Association
  - AWA Southern Tag Team Championship (4 times) – with Norvell Austin
- Professional Wrestling Hall of Fame
  - Class of 2019 - Inducted with "Beautiful" Bobby Eaton
- Southeastern Championship Wrestling
  - NWA Southeastern Tag Team Championship (13 times)
  - NWA Southeastern Tag Team Championship Tournament (1983)
- Windy City Pro Wrestling
  - WCPW Tag Team Championship (1 time)

=== Rose and Starr ===
- Southeastern Championship Wrestling
  - NWA Southeastern Tag Team Championship (1 time)
- All-South Wrestling Alliance
  - ASWA Georgia Tag Team Championship (1 time)

=== Eaton and Lane ===
- Jim Crockett Promotions / World Championship Wrestling
  - NWA United States Tag Team Championship (3 times)
  - NWA World Tag Team Championship (1 time)
- Pro Wrestling Illustrated
  - PWI Tag Team of the Year (1987)
  - Ranked them No. 32 of the 100 best tag teams during the PWI Years in 2003
- Wrestling Observer Newsletter awards
  - Feud of the Year (1988) vs. The Fantastics (Bobby Fulton and Tommy Rogers)
  - Tag Team of the Year (1987, 1988)

=== Eaton and Nelson ===
- NWA Mid-Atlantic
  - NWA Mid-Atlantic Tag Team Championship (1 time)

=== Collett and Lane ===
- Virginia Wrestling Association
  - VWA Tag Team Championship

=== Holly and Gunn ===
- World Wrestling Federation
  - NWA World Tag Team Championship (1 time)
