= New Breed (1980s tag team) =

Professional wrestling tag team

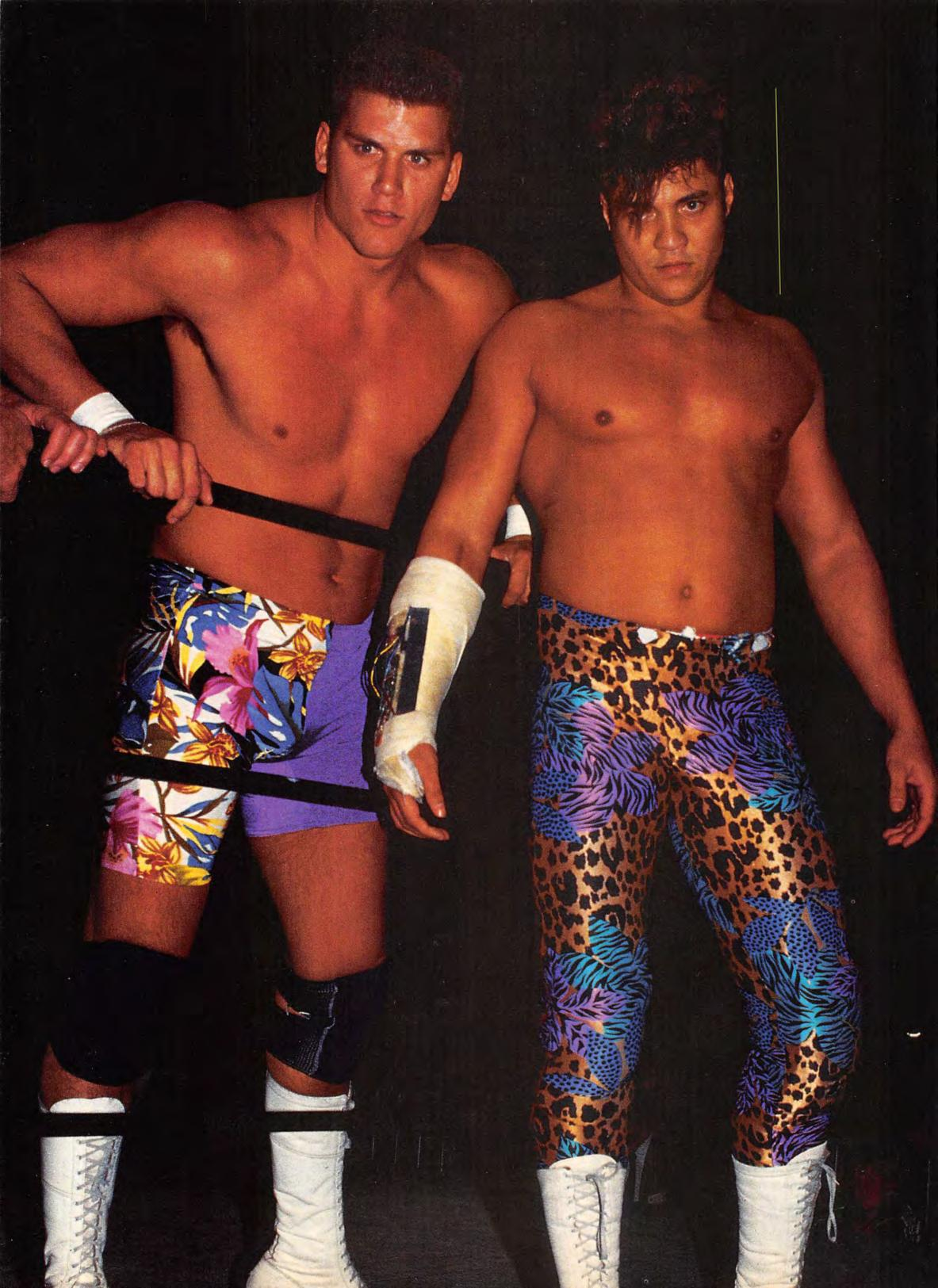
- The New Breed, Sean Royal (left) and Chris Champion (right), circa 1988

Tag team
- Members: Chris Champion; Sean Royal
- Name: New Breed
- Billed from: "The future"
- Debut: September 1986
- Disbanded: December 1987

The New Breed was a professional wrestling tag team, formed in 1986, consisting of Chris Champion and Sean Royal. The team had a gimmick of being time travelers from the then-future of 2002. As a team, Royal and Champion won the NWA Florida Tag Team Championship while working for Championship Wrestling from Florida.

== History ==
In 1986, Chris Champion and Sean Royal were put together as a tag team in Florida Championship Wrestling. Their gimmick had them claiming to be from the future, specifically the year 2002. As a result, they often referred to Dusty Rhodes as "Mr. President". They also believed that Lazer Tron was a real robot, since robots were supposedly common where they were from. They constantly referred to the flux capacitor, the fictional time conduit from Back to the Future. They also made many references to robot toys, referring to Lazer Tron as one of the Go-Bots, and using Transformers references like Cybertron and showing their loyalty to the Decepticons. For a while they were managed by a robot called XTC-1

In 1987, they moved to the NWA's Jim Crockett Promotions and immediately challenged the Rock 'n' Roll Express (Ricky Morton and Robert Gibson). The feud was heating up when both men were injured in a car accident. Royal returned right away, but was not pushed except to be attacked by the Midnight Express (Stan Lane and Bobby Eaton). Champion was out for quite a while, but did return to cut some promos with his cast marked up to look like it was "computerized". The team disbanded shortly after the accident, with Royal quitting wrestling to become a construction worker.

== Championships and accomplishments ==
- Championship Wrestling from Florida
  - NWA Florida Tag Team Championship (1 time)
