= Sean Royal =

American professional wrestler (born 1961)

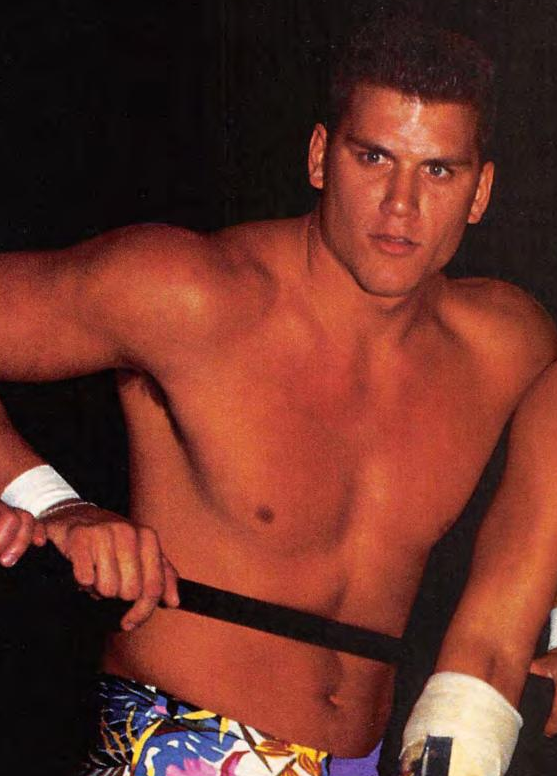
- Royal, c. 1988

Personal information
- Born: Sean Vellenga; February 1, 1961 (age 65) Tampa, Florida, U.S.

Professional wrestling career
- Billed from: "The future"
- Trained by: Hiro Matsuda
- Debut: 1984
- Retired: 2002

Sean Vellenga (born February 1, 1961) is an American former professional wrestler, better known by his ring name, Sean Royal.

== Professional wrestling career ==
=== Early career (1984–1986) ===
Sean Royal made his professional wrestling debut in 1984 after training under Hiro Matsuda. He initially worked for Mid Atlantic Championship Wrestling based in Charlotte, North Carolina.

=== Championship Wrestling from Florida (1986–1987) ===
In 1986, Royal began working for Championship Wrestling from Florida. Initially he worked as a singles wrestler, but it was not long into his tenure in Florida that the promoter and match makers decided to team Royal up with another young wrestler, Chris Champion; and together the two became a regular tag team called The New Breed. The New Breed tag team was given an elaborate backstory and science fiction flavor as they were marketed as wrestlers sent back in time from 2002 to 1986. The duo was presented as having futuristic technology, wore bright neon-colored ring gear and unusual haircuts that were supposed to be the fashion of the future, and at one point had a robot as their manager. The team made various references to future events such as referring to wrestler Dusty Rhodes as "President Rhodes", indicating that Rhodes would win the 2000 presidential election. The team would come to the ring to the sound of the Beastie Boys' song "Fight For Your Right to Party". The team made a special appearance in Memphis, working for the Continental Wrestling Association (CWA) where they lost to the MOD Squad on a show in the Mid-South Coliseum on September 1, 1986.

On December 25, 1986, the New Breed defeated Vic Steamboat and Kendall Windham in the finals of a tournament for the vacant NWA Florida Tag Team Championship, which had been inactive since 1981. After the title win the New Breed was put into a storyline feud with the face team (those that portray the good guys) the Southern Boys (Steve Armstrong and Tracy Smothers). The feud between the two teams led to the Southern Boys defeating the New Breed for the NWA Florida Tag Team Championship on February 11, 1987. Shortly after their title loss the New Breed left Florida.

=== Jim Crockett Promotions/World Championship Wrestling (1987, 1989) ===
The New Breed made their debut for Jim Crockett Promotions (JCP), which was in the process of expanding from the mid-Atlantic region to a national promotion. The team kept their futuristic gimmick and their heel characters (those that portray the bad guys) as they were immediately put up against the popular team the Rock 'n' Roll Express of Ricky Morton and Robert Gibson, stating that they had been sent back from the future to save the fans from the Rock 'n' Roll Express, who would supposedly go crazy over what happened to Rock and Roll in the year 2000. They also claimed that in the future Jimmy Valiant had corrupted future Dusty Rhodes, leading to a dictatorship mockingly calling him "Father Time". They also claimed that masked wrestler LazorTron was in reality a robot from the future, sent to stop them. In the spring of 1987 the New Breed was one of 10 teams competing in a tournament for the vacant NWA United States Tag Team Championship. The team wrestled the father/son duo of Bob Armstrong and Brad Armstrong to a draw, eliminating both teams from the tournament.

The storyline with the Rock 'n' Roll Express was still in its infant stages when the New Breed was involved in a car accident and Chris Champion's injuries forced him to not wrestle for an extended period. Royal teamed up with Gladiator #1 and Gladiator #2, losing to the trio of Kendall Windham, Jimmy Valiant and LazerTron on the undercard on one of JCP's 1987 The Great American Bash series. JCP used the sympathy that Royal and Champion garnered from the car accident to turn the team into faces, as Jim Cornette, the manager of the Midnight Express tried to recruit Royal to his group, but Royal refused. During his recuperation, Champion appeared on television with circuit boards and wires glued to his cast, making it look like it was a futuristic "healing device". Once Champion returned to action the New Breed feuded with the Midnight Express (Bobby Eaton and Stan Lane). The two teams clashed several times, often over the NWA United States Tag Team Championship where most of the matches ended inconclusively.

In an attempt to bolster the fan favorite image and congruent with their futuristic characters, JCP officials decided to give the New Breed a manager, a small remote-controlled robot called XTC-1. On November 26, 1987 the New Breed was scheduled to face the Sheepherders (Luke Williams and Butch Miller) in a steel cage match for the UWF World Tag Team Championship as part of the Universal Wrestling Federation's Superdome pre-Starrcade '87 show, but Champion failed to appear for the event. Royal defeated Killer Khalifa in a singles match at the event instead. Royal since stated in a shoot interview that he was livid with Champion over this, and he retired from full-time wrestling soon after, opting to become a construction worker instead.

Royal returned to WCW (formely Jim Crockett Promotions) for one match in December 1989, teaming with Mike Thor in a loss to the New Zealand Militia on an episode of World Championship Wrestling.

=== New Japan Pro-Wrestling (1993) ===
Royal made a return to pro wrestling in 1993, traveling to Japan to work for New Japan Pro-Wrestling in the fall. Royal teamed up with Brad Armstrong to compete in NJPW's Super Grade Tag League III, a monthlong round-robin tournament NJPW holds each year. The duo ended the tournament with 0 points, losing to teams such as Jushin Thunder Liger and Wild Pegasus, The Barbarian and Masa Saito, Takayuki Iizuka and Akira Nogami, Shiro Koshinaka and Michiyoshi Ohara, the Hell Raisers (Hawk Warrior and Power Warrior), Tatsumi Fujinami and Osamu Kido, Masahiro Chono and Shinya Hashimoto as well as semi-finalists the Jurassic Powers (Scott Norton and Hercules Hernandez) and tournament winners Hiroshi Hase and Keiji Mutoh. He wrestled his last NJPW match on November 4, 1993 as part of a special NJPW show in Sumo Hall. Royal teamed up with the Barbarian, losing to the Jurassic Powers. He would retire from wrestling.

=== NWA Wildside (2000–2002) ===
In 2000, Royal returned to pro wrestling, teaming up with Rusty Riddle to form a team known as Total Destruction in NWA Wildside. As a member of Total Destruction Royal once again plays a heel character, leading to a storyline where the team was banned from NWA Wildside for 30 days. During that time period the team won the NWA Wildside Tag Team Championship from Blackout (Homicide and Rainman) after a surprise challenge, but since the team was supposed to be banned from working in NWA Wildside they were forced to return the championship to Blackout a week later. The duo also had a long running storyline with The Kohl Twins. At the 2001 Freedom Fight, Total Destruction challenged the Kohl Twins for the Wildside Tag Team titles, with Riddle also putting his hair on the line. Royal and Riddle lost and Riddle was shaved bald as a result. On August 8, 2001 Total Destruction defeated the NWA World Tag Team Champions The New Heavenly Bodies (Chris Nelson and Vito DeNucci) by disqualification and thus did not win the championship.

== Championships and accomplishments ==
- Championship Wrestling from Florida
  - NWA Florida Tag Team Championship (1 time) – with Chris Champion
- NWA Wildside
  - NWA Wildside Tag Team Championship (1 time) – with Rusty Riddle
