= Nightmares (professional wrestling) =

Professional wrestling tag team

Tag team
- Name(s): Nightmares; American Eagles; Galaxians
- Members: Danny Davis/Nightmare #1; Ken Wayne/Nightmare #2
- Billed heights: Davis: 5 ft 9 in (1.75 m); Wayne: 5 ft 10 in (1.78 m)
- Combined billed weight: 420 lb (190 kg)
- Debut: 1981
- Years active: 1981–1994

The Nightmares were a wrestling tag team consisting of Danny Davis and Ken Wayne.

== History ==
Danny Davis and Ken Wayne began teaming up as the masked Nightmares in 1981 in Continental Wrestling Association (CWA) in Memphis, Tennessee. In 1982, they went up to Canada to wrestle for Stampede Wrestling. It wasn't until August 1984 when they won their first championship together, the AWA Southern Tag Team Championship, defeating The Rock 'n' Roll Express. They would hold onto the titles for nearly a month, before losing them to Dutch Mantel and Tommy Rich. In 1985, they moved over to the Gulf Coast area to wrestle for Continental Championship Wrestling. In November 1985, they lost their masks to Tommy and Johnny Rich. Together in Continental, they won three NWA Southeastern Tag Team Championships and two NWA Southeast Continental Tag Team Championships. After losing the titles in May 1988, the Nightmares broke up and embarked in a heated rivalry over the NWA Southeastern United States Junior Heavyweight Championship, which lasted until Wayne left the promotion at the end of 1988.

In 1990, Davis and Wayne reunited as the masked Galaxians as enhancement talent for World Championship Wrestling (WCW). In 1991, they took part in a tournament for the Global Wrestling Federation (GWF) to determine their inaugural Tag Team champions; they lost to Billy Jack and Joel Deaton in the first round. By 1992, they returned to Memphis for the United States Wrestling Association (USWA) under masks as The American Eagles known as Liberty and Justice. By 1994, they left the USWA and disbanded shortly thereafter.

== Championships and accomplishments ==
- Continental Championship Wrestling / Continental Wrestling Federation

- NWA Southeastern Continental Tag Team Championship (2 times)
- NWA Southeastern Tag Team Championship (3 times)

- Continental Wrestling Association

- AWA Southern Tag Team Championship (1 time)

- Deep South Wrestling

- DSW Tag Team Championship (3 times, inaugural)
