= Nightmare Danny Davis =

American professional wrestler and referee (born 1952)

Personal information
- Born: Daniel Briley; June 30, 1952 (age 74) Jackson, Tennessee, U.S.
- Children: 2

Professional wrestling career
- Ring name(s): Danny Davis; Galaxian 1 Nightmare Danny Davis; Nightmare 1 Sergeant Danny Davis
- Billed height: 5 ft 9 in (175 cm)
- Billed weight: 213 lb (97 kg)
- Trained by: Buddy Fuller
- Debut: 1977
- Retired: 1997

Daniel Briley (born June 30, 1952), better known by the ring name "Nightmare" Danny Davis, is an American retired professional wrestler and referee. He is the founder and former owner of Ohio Valley Wrestling.

== Career ==
Briley started wrestling in 1977 in the Tennessee territory, where he made a name for himself as "Nightmare" Danny Davis. He would also wrestle as one half of the masked Masters of Terror in the United States Wrestling Association. Davis had a frequent tag team with Ken Wayne in the 1980s. At one time, they wrestled under masks as The Nightmares. The duo also worked under masks as The Galaxians for WCW in the 1990s.

He also wrestled in Smoky Mountain Wrestling in 1992. He retired in 1997 and opened Ohio Valley Wrestling. In 2009, Davis opened Vyper Fight League, an MMA promotion, alongside John "Bradshaw" Layfield. The promotion ceased operations in 2010.

On December 13, 2012, he appeared on a segment of Impact Wrestling where he was training Joseph Park to improve Park's skills. On March 7, 2013, he was named as a judge for TNA Gut Check. He returned to in-ring action in the December 2014 Saturday Night Special, teaming with Trailer Park Trash and losing to War Machine (Shiloh Jonze and Eric Locker).

On April 6, 2018, Davis sold OVW to Al Snow.

== Personal life ==
Briley has one son, Duane Briley, and one daughter April. He is the uncle of wrestler Doug Basham.

== Championships and accomplishments ==
- Continental Championship Wrestling / Continental Wrestling Federation

- NWA Southeastern Continental Tag Team Championship (1 time) - with Ken Wayne
- NWA Southeastern Heavyweight Championship (Northern Division) (1 time)
- NWA Southeastern Tag Team Championship (3 times) - with Ken Wayne
- NWA Southeastern United States Junior Heavyweight Championship (5 times)

- Continental Wrestling Association

- AWA Southern Tag Team Championship (1 time) - with Ken Wayne

- Deep South Wrestling

- DSW Tag Team Championship (3 times) - with Ken Wayne

- Global Wrestling Federation

- GWF Light Heavyweight Championship (3 times)

- Memphis Wrestling Hall of Fame
  - Class of 2024
- Stampede Wrestling

- NWA International Tag Team Championship (Calgary version) (1 time) - with Hubert Gallant
- Stampede British Commonwealth Mid-Heavyweight Championship (1 time)

- United States Wrestling Association

- USWA Junior Heavyweight Championship (7 times)
- USWA Middleweight Championship (1 time)
