= NWA Southeastern United States Junior Heavyweight Championship =

Professional wrestling championship

- The championship belt

Details
- Promotion: Southeastern Championship Wrestling; Continental Championship Wrestling; Continental Wrestling Federation
- Date established: October 1975
- Date retired: September 22, 1989
Statistics
- First champion: Mike Graham
- Final champion: Downtown Bruno
- Most reigns: Bill Ash/Tim Horner (5 reigns)

The NWA Southeastern Junior Heavyweight Championship was a secondary title for wrestlers considered "Junior Heavyweights", that is weighing under 230 lbs. It was promoted in the Alabama, Florida, Tennessee and Mississippi region from 1975 until 1989, first by Southeastern Championship Wrestling from 1975 to 1985 then by its successor Continental Championship Wrestling from 1985 to 1988 and finally by the Continental Wrestling Federation between 1988 and 1989.

== Title history ==
Key
No.	Overall reign number
Reign	Reign number for the specific champion
Days	Number of days held

No.	Champion	Championship change			Reign statistics		Notes	Ref.
No.	Champion	Date	Event	Location	Reign	Days	Notes	Ref.
1	Mike Graham	October 1975	House show	N/A	1	(Note: Due to at least one date being uncertain it is not possible to correctly calculate the reign length)	Recognized in Florida, defends title in Knoxville	
2	Kevin Sullivan	May 18, 1979	House show	Knoxville, Tennessee	1	35		
3	Tony Charles	June 22, 1979	House show	Knoxville, Tennessee	1	4		
4	Kevin Sullivan	June 26, 1979	House show	Knoxville, Tennessee	2	17		
5	Tony Charles	July 13, 1979	House show	Knoxville, Tennessee	2			
6	Dick Steinborn	1980	House show	N/A	1			
7	Jerry Stubbs	1980	House show	N/A	1			
8	Norvell Austin	1980	House show	N/A	1			
9	Jerry Stubbs	1981	House show	N/A	2		Title may have been vacant in 81	
10	Brad Armstrong	January 20, 1981	House show	Mobile, Alabama	1		Wins tournament	
11	Jerry Stubbs	February 1981	House show	N/A	3			
12	Brad Armstrong	February 1981	House show	N/A	2			
13	Jerry Stubbs	April 1981	House show	N/A	4			
Championship history is unrecorded from April 1981 to June 2, 1981.
14	Bill Dundee	June 2, 1981	House show	Memphis, Tennessee	1		Defeated Stan Lane. Title change may be recognized only in Memphis	
Championship history is unrecorded from June 2, 1981 to 1981.
15	Tommy Wright	1981	House show	Dothan, Alabama	1		Won tournament	
16	Norvell Austin	August 1981	House show	N/A	2			
17	Ken Lucas	1981	House show	N/A	1			
18	Luke Williams	1981	House show	N/A	1			
19	Tony Charles	1981	House show	N/A	3			
Championship history is unrecorded from 1981 to 1982.
20	Scott McGhee	1982	House show	N/A	1			
21	Ted Oates	1982	House show	N/A	1			
22	Scott McGhee	May 1982 (NLT)	House show	N/A	2			
23	Brad Armstrong	June 27, 1982	House show	Birmingham, Alabama	3		Vacant in August 1982 when Armstrong moves up to heavyweight	
24	Scott McGhee	September 1982 (NLT)	House show	N/A	3		Won tournament	
25	Bill Ash	November 1982	House show	N/A	1			
26	Robert Gibson	December 1982 (NLT)	House show	N/A	1			
27	Wayne Ferris	December 1982 (NLT)	House show	N/A	1		Vacant December 1982 when Ferris cannot make weight limit	
28	Norman Frederick Charles III	January 1, 1983	House show	N/A	1	18	Won tournament	
29	Robert Gibson	January 19, 1983	House show	N/A	2			
30	Bill Ash	March 1983 (NLT)	House show	N/A	2			
31	Johnny Rich	March 1983 (NLT)	House show	N/A	1			
32	Bill Ash	1983	House show	N/A	3			
33	Tommy Rogers	May 2, 1983	House show	Birmingham, Alabama	1			
34	Chick Donovan	July 1983 (NLT)	House show	N/A	1			
35	Rick Gibson	September 1983 (NLT)	House show	N/A	1			
36	Chick Donovan	October 1983 (NLT)	House show	N/A	2			
37	Tim Horner	October 1983 (NLT)	House show	N/A	1			
38	Ken Lucas	1983	House show	N/A	2			
39	Rip Rogers	November 1983	House show	N/A	1			
40	Ken Lucas	December 1983	House show	N/A	3			
41	David Morgan	February 2, 1984	House show	N/A	1	25		
42	Larry Hamilton	February 27, 1984	House show	Birmingham, Alabama	1	7		
43	Rip Rogers	March 5, 1984	House show	Birmingham, Alabama	2	21		
44	Johnny Rich	March 26, 1984	House show	Birmingham, Alabama	2	42		
45	Tommy Gilbert	May 7, 1984	House show	Birmingham, Alabama	1	56		
46	Scott Armstrong	July 2, 1984	House show	Birmingham, Alabama	1			
47	Tommy Gilbert	September 1984 (NLT)	House show	N/A	2			
48	Scott Armstrong	September 1984 (NLT)	House show	N/A	2			
49	Bill Ash	November 12, 1984	House show	Montgomery, Alabama	3			
50	Scott Armstrong	N/A	House show	N/A	3			
51	Bill Ash	March 1985 (NLT)	House show	N/A	4			
52	Scott Armstrong	July 5, 1985	House show	Montgomery, Alabama	4	10		
53	Bill Ash	July 15, 1985	House show	Birmingham, Alabama	5	77		
54	Roy Lee Welch	September 30, 1985	House show	N/A	1	61		
55	Ken Timbs	November 30, 1985	House show	Birmingham, Alabama	1	30		
56	Tim Horner	December 30, 1985	House show	Birmingham, Alabama	2	63		
57	Tom Prichard	March 3, 1986	House show	Birmingham, Alabama	1	18		
58	Tim Horner	March 21, 1986	House show	Knoxville, Tennessee	3	10		
59	Tom Prichard	March 31, 1986	House show	Birmingham, Alabama	2	28		
60	Tim Horner	April 28, 1986	House show	Birmingham, Alabama	4	12		
61	Tom Prichard	May 10, 1986	House show	Dothan, Alabama	3	18		
62	Tim Horner	May 28, 1986	House show	Birmingham, Alabama	5	96	Teams with Brad Armstrong to defeat Prichard & Jerry Stubbs (Southeastern Champ) in which losing champ would lose his belt	
63	The Ninja	September 1, 1986	CWF NWA Battle of the Belts III	Daytona Beach, Florida	1^{†}	0	Stripped of the title and the reign was unrecognized due to outside interference	
64	Tim Horner	September 1, 1986	House show	Daytona Beach, Florida	5(6)^{†}	29	Returns to Continental with the title	
65	Roy Lee Welch	September 30, 1986	House show	Birmingham, Alabama	2	41		
66	Tom Prichard	November 10, 1986	House show	Birmingham, Alabama	4	60		
67	Larry Hamilton	January 9, 1987	House show	Birmingham, Alabama	2	24		
68	Tom Prichard	February 2, 1987	House show	Knoxville, Tennessee	5	112		
69	Scott Armstrong	May 25, 1987	House show	Birmingham, Alabama	5	105		
70	Larry Hamilton	September 7, 1987	House show	Birmingham, Alabama	3	184		
71	Ken Wayne	March 9, 1988	House show	Hattiesburg, Missippii	1	152		
72	Nightmare Danny Davis	August 8, 1988	House show	Birmingham, Alabama	1	0		
73	Ken Wayne	August 8, 1988	House show	Birmingham, Alabama	2	36		
74	Nightmare Danny Davis	September 13, 1988	House show	Montgomery, Alabama	2	18		
75	Ken Wayne	October 1, 1988	House show	Dothan, Alabama	3	32		
76	Nightmare Danny Davis	November 2, 1988	House show	Harriman, Tennessee	3	179		
77	Alan Martin	April 30, 1989	House show	Montgomery, Alabama	1			
78	Nightmare Danny Davis	May 1989	House show	N/A	4			
79	Kevin Dillinger	May 5, 1989	House show	Knoxville, Tennessee	1	35		
80	Nightmare Danny Davis	June 9, 1989	House show	Knoxville, Tennessee	5	105	Vacant in 89 when Davis leaves the area	
81	Downtown Bruno	September 22, 1989	House show	Knoxville, Tennessee	1		Defeats Butch Cassidy in elimination match. CWF had withdrawn from NWA in 87. Title deactivated when promotion closes in 1989	
