= Ken Wayne (wrestler) =

American professional wrestler

Personal information
- Born: Kenneth Dewayne Peale; January 15, 1959 (age 67) Memphis, Tennessee, U.S.

Professional wrestling career
- Ring name: Ken Wayne
- Billed height: 5 ft 10 in (178 cm)
- Billed weight: 207 lb (94 kg)
- Trained by: Mario Galento
- Debut: 1976
- Retired: 2005

Kenneth Dewayne Peale (born January 15, 1959), better known by the ring name "Nightmare" Ken Wayne, is an American retired professional wrestler and convicted child sex offender. He is the founder and owner of New Experience Wrestling, as well as a board member of Ohio Valley Wrestling.

== Career ==
=== National Wrestling Alliance (1976–1988) ===
Ken Wayne made his debut for the National Wrestling Alliance in 1976 in their various Tennessee member promotions. In 1980, he wrestled a tour for Mid-South Wrestling. In 1981, he wrestled in Los Angeles for NWA Hollywood Wrestling. In 1981, while in Memphis, is where he began teaming up with Danny Davis as The Nightmares. In 1982, he went up to Canada, wrestling a tour for Stampede Wrestling. In 1983, he began wrestling on and off in Georgia Championship Wrestling and Central States Wrestling. In 1985, he joined Continental Championship Wrestling.

=== Later career (1988–2005) ===
After Continental broke away from the NWA and changed into the Continental Wrestling Federation, Wayne stayed with the company until the end of 1988. In January 1989, he returned to Memphis. During this time, he would also wrestle as enhancement talent for both World Championship Wrestling and the World Wrestling Federation. He would continue to wrestle throughout the independents within the Southeast until retiring from active competition in 2005.

== Personal life ==
Wayne is the son of wrestler/promoter Buddy Wayne, who died from pulmonary fibrosis on December 31, 2015, at the age of 81.

His son Eric is also a professional wrestler.

== Child pornography ==
In February 2016, Wayne pleaded guilty and was sentenced to 20 years for child exploitation after investigators found him in possession of child pornography in September 2014. He will serve five years in prison and 15 years under post-release supervision. In addition, he will have to pay $1,000 to the Mississippi Children's Trust Fund, another $1,000 to the Mississippi Crime Victims Compensation Fund, and must register as a sex offender.

== Championships and accomplishments ==
- Continental Championship Wrestling / Continental Wrestling Federation

- NWA Southeastern Continental Tag Team Championship (1 time) - with Danny Davis
- NWA Southeastern Tag Team Championship (3 times) - with Danny Davis
- NWA Southeastern United States Junior Heavyweight Championship (3 times)

- Continental Wrestling Association

- AWA Southern Tag Team Championship (1 time) - with Danny Davis

- Deep South Wrestling

- DSW Tag Team Championship (3 times, inaugural) - with Danny Davis

- United States Wrestling Association

- USWA Junior Heavyweight Championship (1 time, inaugural)

- World Wrestling Council

- WWC World Junior Heavyweight Championship (1 time, longest reign)
