= Chris Champion =

American professional wrestler

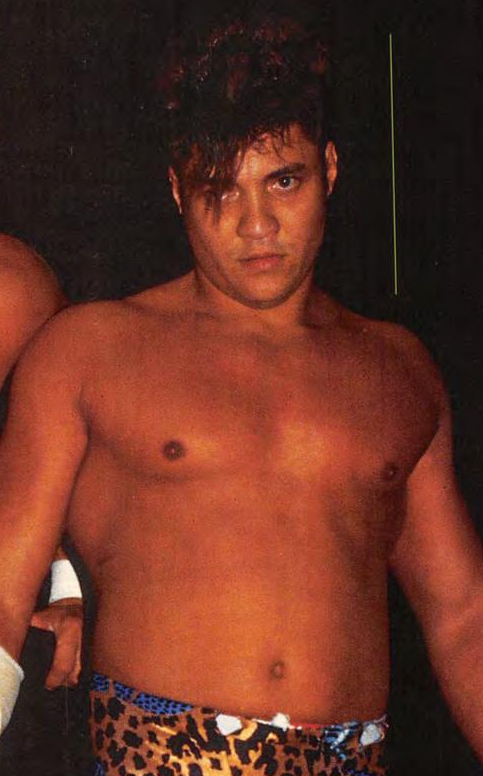
- Champion c. 1988

Personal information
- Born: Christopher Dennis Ashford-Smith; February 17, 1961 Worcester, England
- Died: August 22, 2018 (aged 57) Nashville, Tennessee, U.S.
- Relative: Mark Starr (brother)

Professional wrestling career
- Ring name(s): Chris Champion; Dennis Smith; The Karate Kid; Kowabunga; Sinn; Turtle Kamen; Yoshi Kwan
- Billed height: 6 ft 1 in (185 cm)
- Billed weight: 222 lb (101 kg)
- Billed from: "The Future"; Hunan; Hong Kong
- Trained by: Boris Malenko; Dean Malenko; Joe Malenko
- Debut: 1984
- Retired: 2017

Christopher Dennis Ashford-Smith (17 February 1961 – 22 August 2018), better known by his ring name Chris Champion, was an English professional wrestler. He primarily worked for various National Wrestling Alliance member territories, including Championship Wrestling from Florida and Jim Crockett Promotions. He is also known as Yoshi Kwan, initially from World Championship Wrestling (WCW).

== Early life ==
Christopher Dennis Ashford-Smith was born in Worcester on 17 February 1961. His younger brother Mark was also a professional wrestler under the name Mark Starr, and the two often teamed together.

== Professional wrestling career ==
=== Early career (1984–1986) ===
Ashford-Smith started wrestling in 1984 using the ring name Dennis Smith.

=== Championship Wrestling From Florida (1986–1987) ===
In 1986, he began working for Championship Wrestling from Florida and changed his ring name to "Chris Champion", the name he would be most known under. Champion teamed up with Sean Royal to form a tag team called The New Breed. The "gimmick" of the New Breed was that they claimed to be sent back from the year 2002 to 1986 to compete. As part of their gimmick they claimed that Dusty Rhodes would be elected President of the United States in the 2000 election, and addressed him as "Mr. President". They also referred to having robots and sported very unusual haircuts and bright "futuristic" ring gear in neon colors. Their entrance music was the Beastie Boys' song "Fight For Your Right to Party".

On August 3, 1986, Champion defeated Tyree Pride to win the NWA Bahamas Championship from him, a title he would hold until September 28, 1986 where he lost it to The Falcon. The New Breed won the NWA Florida Tag Team Championship when they defeated Kendall Windham and Vic Steamboat in the finals of a tournament for the vacant titles. The New Breed held the Florida Tag titles from December 25, 1986 until February 21, 1987 where they lost the belts to the Southern Boys (Steve Armstrong and Tracy Smothers). Shortly after the title loss the New Breed left Florida to work for Jim Crockett Promotions (JCP).

=== Jim Crockett Promotions (1987–1988) ===
In JCP the New Breed worked a feud with The Rock 'n' Roll Express, but the storyline was abruptly ended when the New Breed were involved in a car accident that meant Champion could not wrestle for several months. When he returned, he wore a cast on his arm, decorated with computer parts, claiming it was a "future cast". The car crash and return turned the New Breed face, and they began a feud with The Midnight Express (Stan Lane and Bobby Eaton). The feud did not last long as Sean Royal retired a short time later, ending the New Breed team. After the New Breed broke up, Champion participated in the 1988 Jim Crockett Sr. Memorial Cup Tag Team Tournament, teaming with his brother Mark Starr. The team defeated the Twin Devils in the opening round, but were defeated by the Powers of Pain in the second round. Following the Crockett Cup, Champion briefly competed in the NWA as "The Karate Kid", but Ric Flair, Barry Windham and others complained of Champion's stiff kicks and he was soon pushed out of the Crockett territory.

=== Continental Wrestling Association/United States Wrestling Association (1988–1991) ===
Following his departure from JCP Champion showed up in Continental Wrestling Association (CWA) teaming with his brother, Mark Starr to form a team called "Wild Side", a team that feuded with the Rock 'N Roll Express, just as the New Breed had done years before. On July 3, 1989, Wild Side faced then CWA Tag Team Champions Action Jackson and Billy Travis for the titles, in a match that became so out of control that it ended in a "no contest" and the titles being vacated. The following week Wild Side defeated Jackson and Travis in the rematch and won the CWA Tag Team Championship. Their title reign lasted until the Rock 'n' Roll Express defeated them for the belts on September 11, 1989. In late 1989 CWA became United States Wrestling Association (USWA), with the new name came a new attitude from Chris Champion, who broke up Wild Side and began working as a face. Champion worked feuds with USWA's top talent such as Jerry Lawler and The Dirty White Boy. For a while Champion worked as "Kowabunga", dressed in a Teenage Mutant Ninja Turtles bodysuit and mask. Champion left the USWA in 1991.

=== Frontier Martial Arts Wrestling and Independent circuit (1991–1993) ===
Champion, using the Kowabunga gimmick, but using the name "Turtle Kamen," wrestled a tour of Japan for Frontier Martial Arts Wrestling in August 1991. While in FMW, he teamed up with the likes of his brother Mark Starr, Jimmy Backlund, Ricky Fuji, and Amigo Ultra and battled the likes of Eiji Ezaki, Masashi Honda, and kickboxer Katsuji Ueda. After FMW, Champion returned to the States to compete in the independent circuit, namely the International Championship Wrestling Alliance in Florida and the Mountain Wrestling Association in Kentucky. He would briefly appear in Smoky Mountain Wrestling.

=== World Championship Wrestling (1993) ===
In June 1993, Champion returned to World Championship Wrestling (WCW), where he was given the ring persona "Yoshi Kwan", and was managed by Harley Race. Originally, the name was supposed to be "Yo Chi Kwan"- a Chinese name, but announcer Tony Schiavone announced the first name as "Yoshi" (which is Japanese), and it stuck. The Yoshi Kwan character was billed as being from Asia (either Hunan or Hong Kong) and wore makeup to make him appear to be Asian. He grew a Fu Manchu moustache and drew a dragon tattoo on his right arm. Kwan scored victories over Brad Armstrong, Marcus Alexander Bagwell, 2 Cold Scorpio and others while managed by Race. Kwan feuded with Cactus Jack, with the two facing off in a singles match at WCW's 1993 Fall Brawl which Cactus Jack won. Kwan was set to face Ricky Steamboat at Halloween Havoc, but a knee injury prevented him from wrestling and he was soon out of WCW.

=== Late career (1993–2008, 2017) ===
Champion worked as "Yoshi Kwan" on the American independent circuit, as well as returning to FMW for a tour in March 1996. He returned to the USWA in April 1996, but would leave the company three months later. He would resurrect the Turtle Kamen character for BattlARTS in 1999.

Champion later adopted a character called "Sinn" that he used both in the United States and, later, in the United Kingdom.

In 1998, Champion worked with Chris Alexander against Frost and Mindbender for the New Age Wrestling Alliance Tag Team Championship. The title was held up due to a double countout.

In July 2002, Champion had a major stroke and was in the critical care unit for a while after that. He was able to make a full recovery from the stroke and returned to wrestling. In 2006, he teamed with Blackie West in the Southern Wrestling Federation, as "The SS". They won the SWF Tag Team Championship from Mighty Hojo and Scotty McKeever in 2006. He also worked as a booker there.

Champion returned to the ring for a one night appearance as Yoshi Kwan in October 2017 for Southern Wrestling Federation in Tullahoma, Tennessee, losing to Petey St. Croix.

== Death ==
On 22 August 2018, at the age of 57, Champion died in Nashville, Tennessee. According to his friend Wolfie D, his death was caused by another stroke. A YouTube user claiming to be Champion's daughter verified this, saying he suffered multiple strokes during his final days and was on life support for a few days before dying.

== Championships and accomplishments ==
- Transatlantic Wrestling Challenge
  - TWC Heavyweight Championship (1 time)
- Championship Wrestling from Florida
  - NWA Florida Bahamian Championship (1 time)
  - NWA Florida Tag Team Championship (1 time) - with Sean Royal
- Championship Wrestling Association
  - CWA Tag Team Championship (1 time) - with Mark Starr
- Coliseum Championship Wrestling
  - CCW Heavyweight Championship (1 time)
- New Age Wrestling Alliance
  - NAWA World Tag Team Championship (1 time) - with Chris Justice.
- Southern Wrestling Federation
  - SWF Tag Team Championship (1 time) - with Blackie West
- Other titles
  - SWA North American Championship (1 time)
