= Robert Gibson (wrestler) =

American professional wrestler (born 1958)

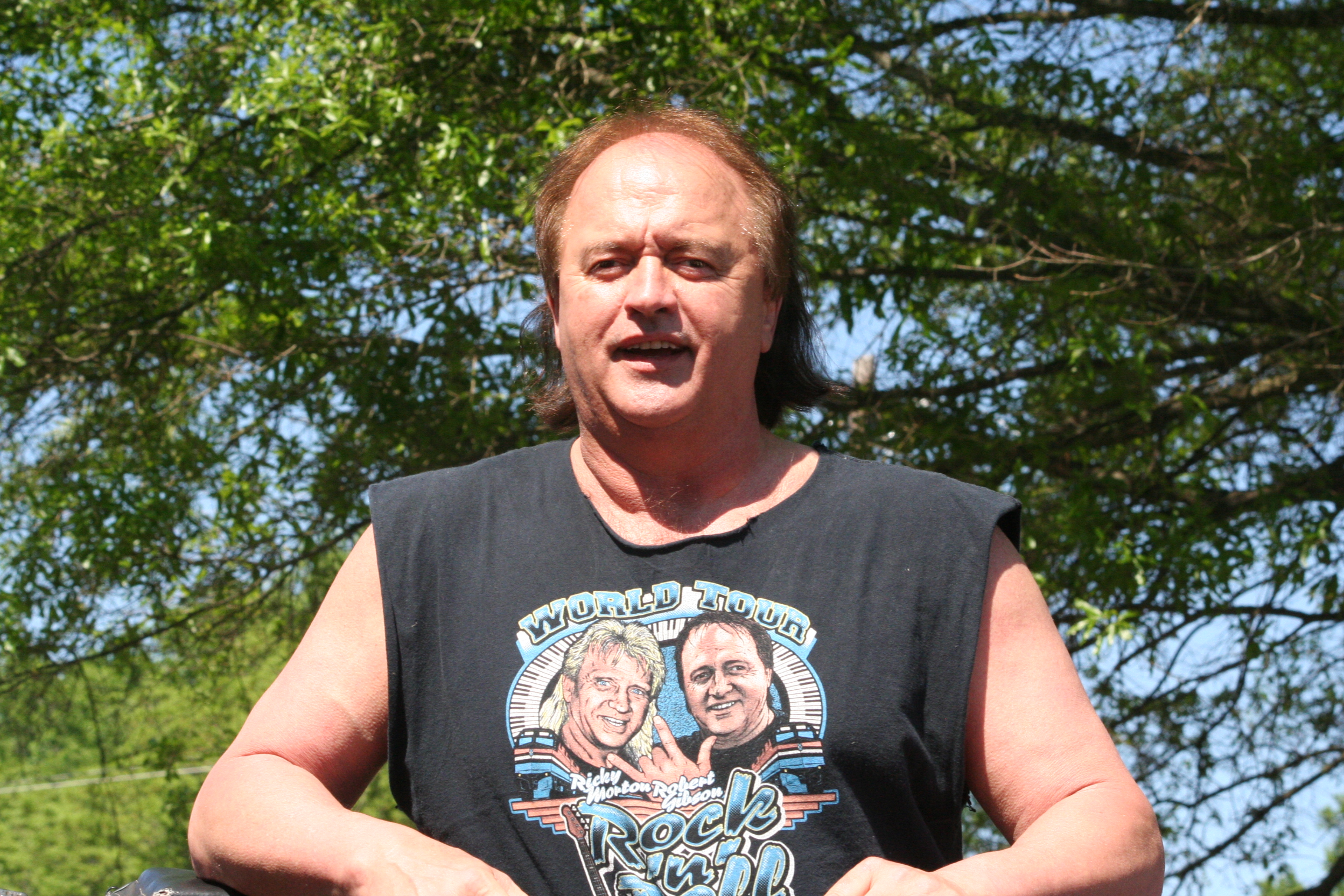
- Gibson in 2013

Personal information
- Born: Reuben Cain; July 19, 1958 (age 68) Pensacola, Florida, U.S.

Professional wrestling career
- Ring name(s): Robert Fuller Jr. Robert Gibson
- Billed height: 5 ft 11 in (180 cm)
- Billed weight: 224 lb (102 kg)
- Trained by: Rick Gibson
- Debut: 1977

Robert Gibson (born Reuben Cain, July 19, 1958) is an American professional wrestler. He is best known as one half of the tag team known as The Rock 'n' Roll Express, with Ricky Morton. He has competed in singles competition also, and has won various singles championships throughout his career. Gibson was inducted into the WWE Hall of Fame as a member of The Rock 'n' Roll Express, on March 31, 2017.

== Professional wrestling career ==
=== Early career (1977–1983) ===
Gibson started wrestling as Robert Gibson in 1977. His first match was against Eddie Sullivan. He was trained by his brother Ricky Gibson and teamed with him in the southern territories.

=== The Rock 'N Roll Express (1983–2003) ===
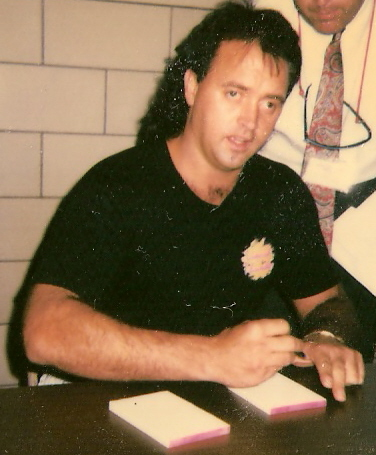
Gibson at an autograph signing in 1991

In 1983, he formed the Rock 'N Roll Express with Ricky Morton. They feuded with The Midnight Express (Bobby Eaton and Dennis Condrey) in the CWA, several other territories, and, eventually, the feud carried over into the National Wrestling Alliance (NWA)'s Jim Crockett Promotions in 1985. They won the NWA Tag Title four times while there and feuded with the Four Horsemen, Ivan and Nikita Koloff, and the team of Rick Rude and Manny Fernandez. Even though he and Morton were of similar build and wrestled a similar style, Gibson was always booked as the stronger and more powerful of the two.

Gibson was injured in 1990 and when he returned to World Championship Wrestling (WCW) in 1991, Morton turned on him to join The York Foundation. They feuded and Gibson teamed with Tom Zenk, but had no success and soon left WCW. Wrestled briefly as a singles in Puerto Rico for the World Wrestling Council. He rejoined Morton in Smoky Mountain Wrestling (SMW) and they feuded with the Heavenly Bodies led by Jim Cornette. Shortly before SMW's demise, Gibson turned heel and joined "Cornette's Army". The team then had a run in the USWA, followed by stints in the WWF in 1993 and WCW in 1996. In 1998, they were part of the "NWA" angle in the World Wrestling Federation (WWF) for a brief period. The Rock n' Roll express were awarded the NWA tag team championships before losing them to The Headbangers a month later. In 1998, he went on his own to wrestle for Extreme Championship Wrestling. On February 12, 2000, he returned to WCW as he lost to WCW World Television Champion Jim Duggan on WCW Saturday Night. Their last run in a big federation was with Total Nonstop Action Wrestling when they were part of Vince Russo's Sports Entertainment Xtreme faction.

=== Later career (2002–present) ===
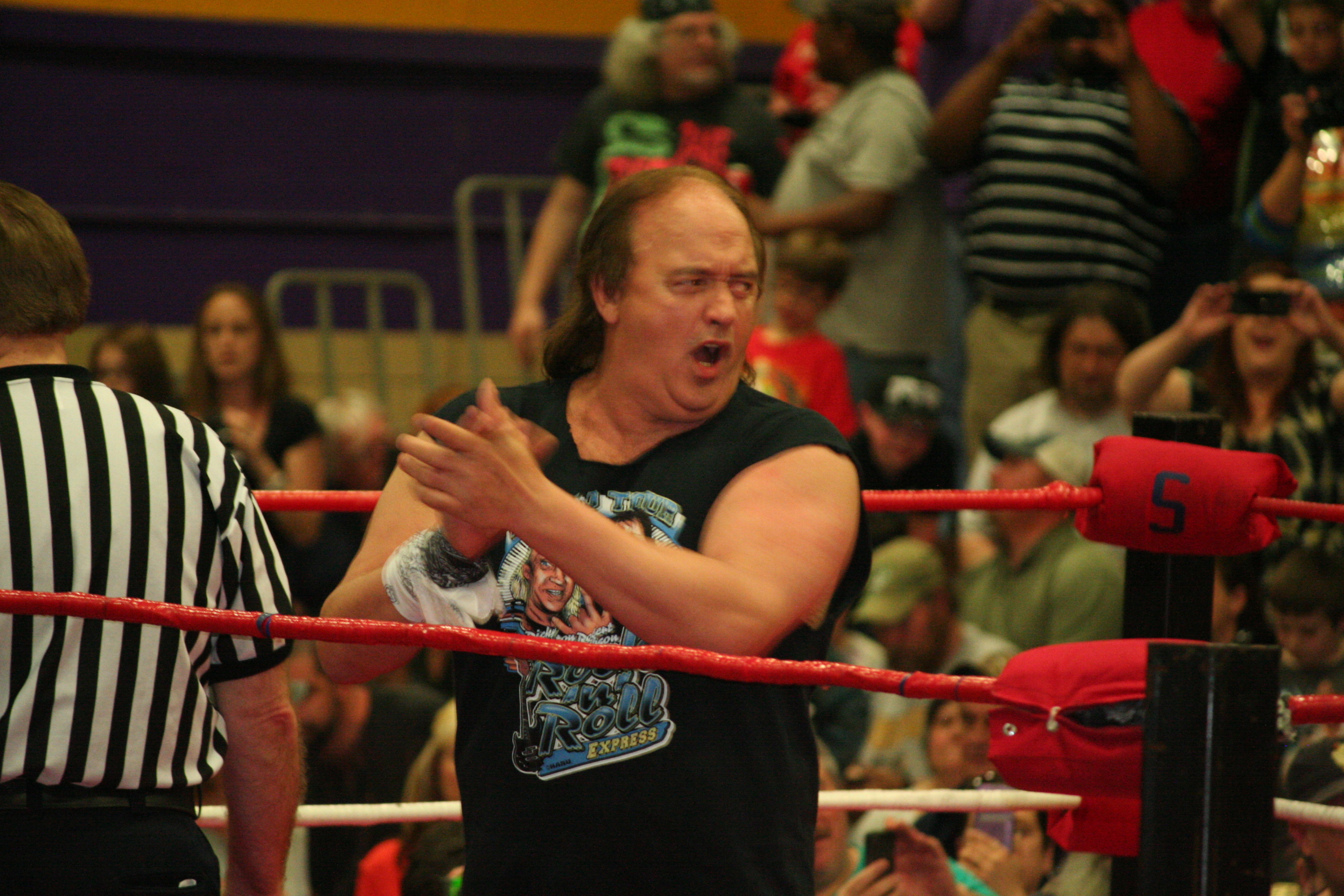
Gibson in 2013

He also appeared at one Wrestle Birmingham show in 2002 as "Robert Fuller Jr.", pretending to be the son of veteran wrestler Robert Fuller, a gimmick also used by other wrestlers. In late 2003/2004, Robert along with Ricky Morton, joined the newly formed "Original" Big Time Wrestling, under the banner of the All World Wrestling League. From 2007 to 2009, he worked for Ultimate Wrestling, a promotion in his home town of Pensacola, Florida, where he was one half of the first ever Ultimate Wrestling Tag-team Champions with Bobby Doll. In September 2010, he returned to Ultimate Wrestling. In 2014, The Rock-n-Roll Express was still wrestling on the independent circuit. In 2016, The Rock N' Roll Express made a special appearance as part of TNA's weekly televised program Impact Wrestling's Total Nonstop Deletion episode, where they took part in the Tag Team Apocalypto match along with other tag teams. In February 2017, WWE played a video package of the Rock n' Roll Express and the announcement of their hall of fame induction set for pre-WrestleMania. The Rock N Roll Express participated in the 2019 edition of the Jim Crockett Cup, but were defeated by The Briscoe Brothers in the first round. During the NWA television tapings on October 1, 2019, they won the NWA World Tag Team Championship. The team made their New Japan Pro Wrestling debut during the Fighting Spirit Unleashed 2019 event, 3 events promoted by NJPW in the United States.

As of 2025, Gibson and Morton are in their late sixties and have been teaming together for over 40 years, and still work in the independents.

== Personal life ==
Gibson has acknowledged during a fundraising event at the Western Pennsylvania School for the Deaf that he is a hearing child of deaf parents. He knows sign language and often speaks with his hands in the ring before his matches.

His brother Ricky Gibson died on September 15, 2006. Robert's mother and father are also deceased. The WWE acknowledged Ricky's death on WWE.com. Robert is engaged to Tami McMaster. He is part owner of Zeke's Deep Sea Fishing tours in Orange Beach, Alabama.

In 2016, Gibson opened a wrestling school in Douglasville, Georgia, which also doubles as an independent wrestling promotion called All Pro Championship Wrestling.

== Championships and accomplishments ==
- Appalachian Mountain Wrestling
  - AMW Tag Team Championship (1 time)– with Ricky Morton
- All-Pro Championship Wrestling
  - APCW Tag Team Championship (3 times) – with Jason Gibson and Mike Youngblood (2)
- All-Pro Wrestling
  - APW Heavyweight Championship (1 time)
  - APW Tag Team Championship (1 time)
- All-Star Wrestling
  - ASW Tag Team Championship (1 time) – with Ricky Morton
- Cauliflower Alley Club
  - Tag Team Award (2022) – with Ricky Morton
- Jim Crockett Promotions
  - NWA World Tag Team Championship (Mid-Atlantic version) (4 times) – with Ricky Morton
- Korean Pro-Wrestling Association
  - NWA World Tag Team Championship (1 time) – with Ricky Morton
- NWA Mid Atlantic Championship Wrestling
  - MACW Tag Team Championship (4 times) - with Ricky Morton (3) and Brad Armstrong (1)
- Memphis Wrestling Hall of Fame
  - Class of 2024 – Ricky Morton
- Mid-South Wrestling Association (Tennessee)
  - MSWA Southern Tag Team Championship (1 time) - with Ricky Morton
- Mid-South Wrestling Association
  - Mid-South Tag Team Championship (3 times) – with Ricky Morton
- National Wrestling Alliance
  - NWA World Tag Team Championship (3 times) – with Ricky Morton^{1}
  - NWA Hall of Fame (Class of 2006)
- NWA Hollywood Wrestling
  - NWA Americas Tag Team Championship (1 time) – with Ricky Gibson
- NWA Mid-America / Continental Wrestling Association / Championship Wrestling Association
  - AWA Southern Tag Team Championship (5 times) – with Ricky Gibson (3), Bill Dundee (1), and Ricky Morton (1)
  - CWA Tag Team Championship (1 time) – with Ricky Morton
  - CWA World Tag Team Championship (1 time) – with Ricky Morton
  - NWA Mid-America Heavyweight Championship (1 time)
  - NWA Mid-America Tag Team Championship (1 time) – with Don Fargo
- NWA Southwest
  - NWA World Tag Team Championship (1 time) – with Ricky Morton
- NWA Wildside
  - NWA Wildside Tag Team Championship (1 time) – with Ricky Morton
- New Age Championship Wrestling
  - NACW Tag Team Championship (1 time)– with Ricky Morton
- Pro Wrestling eXpress
  - PWX Tag Team Championship (1 time) – with Vince Kaplack
- Pro Wrestling Illustrated
  - PWI ranked him #99 of the top 500 singles wrestlers of the "PWI Years" in 2003
  - PWI ranked him #4 of the Top 100 Tag Teams of the "PWI Years" with Ricky Morton in 2003.
- Professional Wrestling Hall of Fame and Museum
  - Class of 2021 - Inducted as a member of The Rock 'N' Roll Express
- Smoky Mountain Wrestling
  - SMW Beat the Champ Television Championship (1 time)
  - SMW Tag Team Championship (4 times) – with Ricky Morton
- Southeastern Championship Wrestling
  - NWA Southeastern Tag Team Championship (1 time) – with Ricky Gibson
  - NWA Southeast United States Junior Heavyweight Championship (2 times)
- Traditional Championship Wrestling
  - TCW Tag Team Championship (1 time) – with Ricky Morton
- Ultimate Championship Wrestling/Ultimate Wrestling
  - Ultimate Wrestling Tag Team Championship (1 time) - with Bobby Doll
- United States Wrestling Association
  - USWA World Tag Team Championship (2 times) - with Ricky Morton
- UPW Pro Wrestling
  - UPW Tag Team Championship (1 time)– with Ricky Morton
- Viral Pro Wrestling
  - VPW Tag Team Championship (1 time) - with Ricky Morton
- Renegade Wrestling Alliance
  - RWA Tag Team Championship (1 time)– with Ricky Morton
- World Organization of Wrestling
  - WOW Tag Team Championship (1 time) – with Ricky Morton
- Wrestling Observer Newsletter
  - Wrestling Observer Newsletter Hall of Fame (Class of 2014) – with Ricky Morton
- WWE
  - WWE Hall of Fame (Class of 2017 — with Ricky Morton)

^{1}One of their reigns began in Memphis, Tennessee, though the records are unclear as to which promotion they were wrestling for. Another reign began with them being awarded the title, though it is not revealed where they were awarded nor which promotion they were wrestling for at the time.
