= Burrhead Jones =

American professional wrestler

Personal information
- Born: Melvin Nelson; 1936 or 1937 Berkeley County, South Carolina
- Died: October 15, 2017 (aged 80) New York City, New York

Professional wrestling career
- Ring name(s): Burrhead Jones; Cockleburrhead Jones; Jimmy Jones
- Debut: circa 1960s
- Retired: 1987

Melvin Nelson (1936/1937 – October 15, 2017) was an American professional wrestler. He competed in the United States under the ring names Jimmy Jones and Burrhead Jones. As an African American wrestler, he was not permitted to wrestle against caucasians in some territories, thus he also worked as a referee.

== Early life ==
Nelson was born and raised in Moncks Corner, South Carolina. His father left before he was born, and his mother moved away to find work when Nelson was two years old. He grew up with his grandparents and five siblings. He worked in the family's cotton fields for several years before moving to New York City at age 17. He found employment at a vegetable packing plant and later worked as an elevator operator at a store.

== Professional wrestling career ==
Nelson began training with professional wrestlers at a gym near the store where he worked. After gaining muscle and learning how to wrestle, he was given the ring name Jimmy Jones by Vincent J. McMahon upon being hired to compete in the World Wide Wrestling Federation. He competed in occasional matches for the WWWF from 1968 to 1971. His WWWF stint included a match against Ivan Koloff, who went on to win the WWWF Championship two months later.

Nelson also competed in several other promotions, as many wrestling organizations in the United States were racially segregated and there were not enough African Americans in any single promotion to provide sufficient competition. As a result, Nelson also worked as a referee when no African American opponent was available.

In the early 1970s, Nelson wrestled in the Continental Wrestling Association based in Tennessee. He teamed with Bearcat Brown and Charlie Cook and had a series of matches against Jerry Lawler, Jim White, and Sam Bass. In the middle of the decade, he competed in the Tennessee-based Gulf Coast Championship Wrestling. Nelson also wrestled for Championship Wrestling from Florida.

Nelson's ring name was changed as a joke by promoter and wrestler Billy Hines. He told the media that Nelson would be competing as Cockleburrhead Jones, although the promotion later shortened the name to Burrhead Jones. The name which some people believe to be a racial slur, was a reference to Nelson's afro hairstyle. As Burrhead Jones, Nelson also competed for Montgomery, Alabama's Tri-State Wrestling, where he originally competed as a heel (villain). After losing a tar-and-feather match, which saw Jones end up covered in molasses and feathers, Jimmy Golden came to the ring and asked to team with him. Golden was a face (fan favorite), and the storyline saw Golden convert Jones. Together, the pair later held the Tri-State Wrestling Tag Team Championship. Jones also competed in, and lost, a tar-and-feather match in Hattiesburg, Mississippi. After the match in Mississippi, the National Association for the Advancement of Colored People (NAACP) protested and several wrestling shows were cancelled as a result.

== Retirement and death ==
Nelson also worked in advertising for A&M Furniture Mart, a local Montgomery, Alabama furniture store. Nelson continued to reside in Moncks Corner, South Carolina, where he found work as a forklift operator after retiring from wrestling. In 2006, he moved to New York City to be closer to his children. He died at a hospital in New York City at the age of 80 on October 15, 2017.

== Championships and accomplishments ==
- NWA Mid-America
  - NWA Southern Junior Heavyweight Championship (1 time)
- Tri-State Wrestling
  - Tri-State Heavyweight Champion (1 time) 1974
  - Tri-State Wrestling Tag Team Championship (1 time)
