= Jim White (wrestler) =

American professional wrestler (1942–2010)

Personal information
- Born: James White; July 11, 1942 Rogersville, Tennessee, U.S.
- Died: January 7, 2010 (aged 67)

Professional wrestling career
- Ring name(s): Jim White; Tony York; The Medic; Woodrow; The Green Shadow; Tiny York; Red Shadow; The Scorpion
- Trained by: Johnny Thunder
- Debut: 1959
- Retired: 1985

James White (July 11, 1942 – January 7, 2010) was an American professional wrestler during the 1960s and 1970s in the southern United States. He was frequently the tag team partner of Jerry Lawler.

== Professional wrestling career ==
White entered the professional wrestling business after meeting and training with Johnny Thunder. Thunder later introduced him to Chicago promoter Fred Kohler's booker. White's first match was in 1959 against Johnny Kace. Because he was only 17 at the time, his father had to sign a parental consent form to allow him to wrestle. Afterward, White also began wrestling for Nick Gulas in Nashville on the weekends, while he continued to attend high school during the week.

After graduating high school, White became a full-time wrestler, teaming with Ron Wright under manager Ron Bass. He wrestled across the southern United States, even competed as The Medic under a mask. In 1970, he began wrestling in Alabama, teaming with Roy Klein as The Green Shadows. After the team lost their masks, they became known as Woodrow and Roy Bass, with Sam Bass as their manager. As a singles wrestler in 1972, he also used the ring name The Green Shadow, with Dr. Ken Ramey as his manager.

White also frequently teamed with Jerry Lawler. In the Gulf Coast Championship Wrestling promotion, the team won the NWA Tennessee Tag Team Championship no later than November 1972, but lost it to Tommy Gilbert and Bearcat Brown on December 8 of that year. In 1973, the team won the NWA Southern Tag Team Championship. They held the title a total of seven times that year. Lawler and White also had a series of matches against Melvin Nelson and various partners. The team, however, split by 1974.

After the split with Lawler, White moved to the Gulf Coast, where he held the NWA United States Tag Team Championship (Tri-State version) with Steve Lawler in September 1974. He wrestled only occasionally in the 1980s, wrestling his last match in 1985 due to hip pain.

White later worked for Diehard Championship Wrestling from 1999 to 2004 managing such stars as the Mongolian Stomper, DCW Heavyweight Champion Lee Luger, Billy Joe Travis, Jamie (Too Cool) Stone, The Hansen Brothers (Brody & Billy Jack), and The Tennessee Connection (Chuck Lee & J.D.Biggs). At the age of 65, he defeated The Matador for the DCW Heavyweight Championship via fireball. He also was commissioner for Southern Championship Wrestling, a southeastern Kentucky promotion, in his last couple of years before his death.

== Personal life ==
White played American football in High School. But he could not tell his football coach that he was a wrestler because he would have had to quit the team.

After retiring from professional wrestling, White became an avid camper and fisher. In 1987, he was employed as the transportation for alcohol and drug patients to rehabilitation centers. He also worked as the general manager of Alono, Inc., which was an organization that treated people for drug and alcohol abuse.

White had a wife, Barbara, and two sons, Jeff and Tommy. Years after his divorce, he moved to Kentucky in 1997 and lived with his significant other Beatrice and welcomed her two children, Shelia and Wayne, as his own. White died at the age of 67 on January 7, 2010, of cancer.

== Championships and accomplishments ==
- Cauliflower Alley Club
  - Honoree (1997)
- Diehard Championship Wrestling
  - DCW Heavyweight Championship (1 time)
- NWA Mid-America
  - NWA Southern Tag Team Championship (Mid-America version) (7 times) - with Jerry Lawler
- NWA Tri-State
  - NWA United States Tag Team Championship (Tri-State version) (1 time) - with Steve Lawler
- Southeastern Championship Wrestling
  - NWA Tennessee Tag Team Championship (1 time) - with Jerry Lawler
- Southern States Wrestling
  - East Tennessee Wrestling Hall of Fame (Class of 1999)
