= Whitey Caldwell =

American wrestler (1935-1972)

Personal information
- Born: July 2, 1935 Morristown, Tennessee, United States
- Died: October 7, 1972 (aged 37) Kingsport, Tennessee, United States

Professional wrestling career
- Billed height: 6"1
- Billed weight: 225 lb (102 kg)
- Debut: 1956 c.

Whitey Caldwell (July 2, 1935 – October 7, 1972) was an American professional wrestler who mainly worked in the Gulf Coast and Tennessee territories.

== Professional wrestling career ==
Whitey Caldwell made his professional wrestling debut in the 1950s. During most of his career he feuded with Ron Wright. Caldwell and Wright would have chain matches in the late 1960s and early 1970s in Tennessee. In 1961, Wright seriously injured Caldwell (putting him out of action for a year), who was by then a very popular wrestling babyface and television champion.

On November 21, 1962, Caldwell defeated Wright in a Hair vs Hair match. From 1969 to 1971, Caldwell would win the NWA Tennessee Tag Team Championship six times with Ron Wright, Les Thatcher (three times), Johnny Walker, Frankie Cain, and Bearcat Brown. On September 29, 1972, Caldwell won his last title defeating his arch rival Ron Wright for the NWA Southeastern Heavyweight Championship (Northern Division) in Knoxville, Tennessee.

== Death ==
On October 7, 1972, Caldwell had wrestled a TV-taping that afternoon in Knoxville and that evening wrestled in Morristown, Tennessee. That night, Caldwell was killed in a car accident when a man was driving at high speed and was trying to pass cars when he hit Caldwell in a curve. Caldwell died in the hospital. Caldwell was champion when he died.

In 1994, Caldwell was inducted into the Smoky Mountain Wrestling Hall of Fame inducted by Ron Wright.

== Championships and accomplishments ==
- NWA Mid-America
  - NWA Tennessee Tag Team Championship (6 times) – with Ron Wright (1), Les Thatcher (3), Johnny Walker (1), Frankie Cain (1) & Bearcat Brown (1)
  - NWA Southeastern Heavyweight Championship (2 times)
