= Dutch Mantel =

American professional wrestler, manager, and podcaster (born 1949)

Dutch Mantell
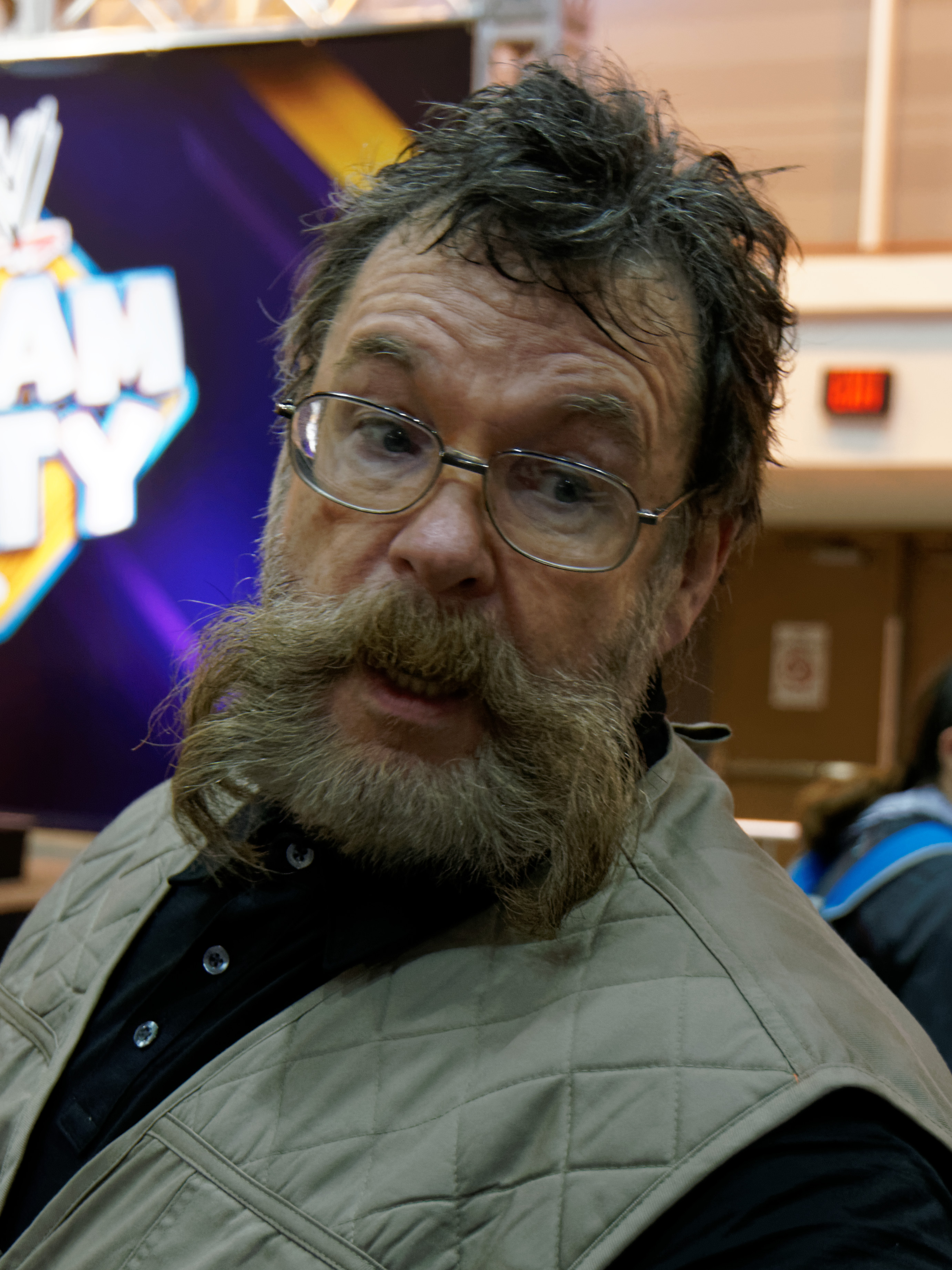
- Mantell in 2014

Personal information
- Born: Wayne Maurice Keown; November 29, 1949 (age 76) Walhalla, South Carolina, U.S.
- Children: 1
- Website: dirtydutchmantell.com

Professional wrestling career
- Ring name(s): Chris Gallagher; Dutch Mantel; Dutch Mantell; Texas Dirt; Uncle Zebekiah; Wayne Cowen; Zeb Colter; Zebekiah
- Billed height: 6 ft 0 in (1.83 m)
- Billed weight: 225 lb (102 kg)
- Billed from: "Wandering along the roads of U.S. Route 190" "Oil Trough, Texas"; Nashville, Tennessee
- Debut: 1972
- Retired: 2013
- Military service
- Allegiance: United States
- Branch: United States Army
- Unit: 25th Infantry Division
- Conflicts: Vietnam War
- Awards: Vietnam Service Medal

YouTube information
- Channel: Story Time with Dutch Mantell
- Years active: 2015–present
- Genre: Professional wrestling
- Subscribers: 145 thousand
- Views: 59 million

Wayne Maurice Keown (born November 29, 1949) is an American professional wrestling manager, booker and retired professional wrestler, better known by the ring name Dutch Mantel (also spelled Dutch Mantell). Since May 2022, Mantell has co-hosted Story Time with Dutch Mantell, hosted by James Romero on the WSI Network.

Keown debuted in 1972, as Wayne Cowan. He achieved fame in the regional and independent circuits, as well as World Championship Wrestling (WCW), as "Dirty" Dutch Mantell. Keown also worked with the World Wrestling Federation (WWF, now WWE) as Uncle Zebekiah in the mid-1990s, and again in the 2010s as Zeb Colter. In the late 1990s, 2000s, and late-2010s, he worked as a booker for the World Wrestling Council (WWC), International Wrestling Association, and Total Nonstop Action Wrestling (TNA) as well as Championship Wrestling from Florida.

== Early life ==
Keown graduated from Walhalla High School in Walhalla, South Carolina. He attended Clemson University for one year before being drafted into military service, undergoing basic training at Ft. Jackson, South Carolina. Keown was then assigned to the U.S. Army's 25th Infantry Division, and was later awarded the Vietnam Service Medal for his service during the Vietnam War.

== Professional wrestling career ==
=== Various territories (1972–1990) ===
Keown debuted in 1972 as "Wayne Cowan". He then became "Dutch Mantel", and added the "Dirty" nickname in 1980. The Dutch Mantel name was taken by an earlier wrestler named Alfred Albert Joe de Re la Gardiur. He wrestled for various Southern promotions, and achieved considerable success in the National Wrestling Alliance.

Mantel was instrumental in the careers of several huge wrestling stars of the nineties, including the Blade Runners, who later went on to achieve fame as Sting and The Ultimate Warrior. The Undertaker and Kane both were early recipients of Mantel's astute wrestling knowledge, which served them well in their careers. Mantel also is credited with giving Steve Austin his stage surname, since Austin's real name at the time was Steve Williams (which was currently in use in wrestling by "Dr. Death" Steve Williams). Mantell originally considered giving Austin the stage names of either "Stevie Rage" or "William Stevenson III". At the time, he was a booker for Jerry Jarrett's Memphis territory.

Mantel formed several tag teams throughout his career, including The Kansas Jayhawks (with Bobby Jaggers), and The Desperados, which lasted only two months. Mantel achieved his greatest notoriety in 1979 when he and then-partner, Cowboy Frankie Laine, as Los Vaqueros Locos, sold out the 16,000-seat Hiram Bithorn Stadium in San Juan, Puerto Rico for an unprecedented nine weeks in a row, a record that still stands. They had a unique gimmick, where they put US$1,000 all in silver dollar coins at stake to the team that could defeat them.

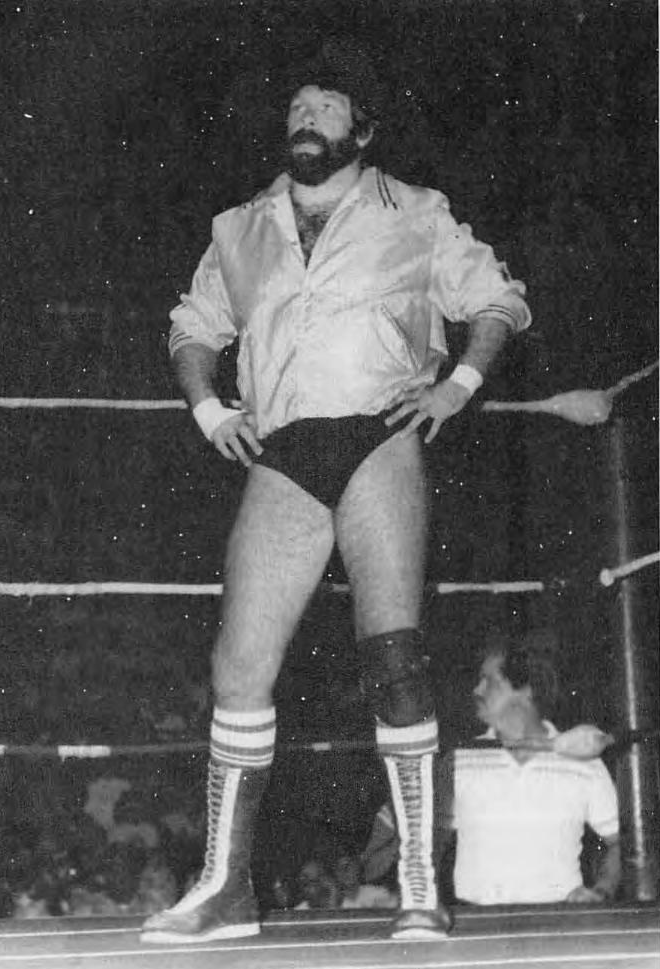
Mantel, circa 1985

Mantel's other notable achievement was in 1982 when he and Jerry "the King" Lawler faced off in a good guy vs. good guy series. Fans were torn between these two stalwarts of the Memphis ring wars. Mantel achieved what no other opponent could do while Lawler was a babyface and that was to get a clear cut win over the King. In 1986, after Lawler lost a "Loser Leaves Town" gimmick match against Bill Dundee, Lawler and Mantell finally mended their ways long enough to face Dundee and Buddy Landel in a Texas Tornado Death Match in Memphis' Mid South Coliseum in front of a sold out red hot Memphis crowd. The match went a record 26 falls, taking one hour and 15 minutes to accomplish. The match saw Dutch Mantell reach his feet before Landell.

=== World Championship Wrestling (1990–1991) ===
In 1990, he worked for World Championship Wrestling (WCW) as a commentator on WCW WorldWide alongside Tony Schiavone and in 1991, WCW created a stable known as "the Desperados" consisting of Dutch Mantell, Black Bart and Deadeye Dick. The Desperados were packaged with the gimmick of being three bumbling cowboys looking to meet up with Stan Hansen to go to WCW and become a team. Over the course of a few months, they were promoted through a series of vignettes by which they would be beaten up in saloons, searching ghost towns, and riding horses. Hansen reportedly wanted no part of the storyline and left for Japan, never to return to wrestle in North America. Without Hansen, the group were pushed into service as jobbers and were dissolved as a stable before the end of the year.

=== Smoky Mountain Wrestling (1991–1994) ===
When Jim Cornette's independent wrestling promotion Smoky Mountain Wrestling opened in 1991, Mantel, joined by Bob Caudle, served as the original color commentator for the television broadcasts, and would give something of a heel perspective. He also hosted a weekly talk segment called "Down and Dirty with Dutch," where he would interview the stars of SMW. He remained with Smoky Mountain until around 1994.

=== World Wrestling Federation (1995–1996) ===
From 1995 to 1996, Mantel appeared in the World Wrestling Federation as "Uncle Zebekiah." He was the manager of The Blu Brothers until they were released in October 1995 and in January 1996, he returned as just "Zebekiah" and managed Justin "Hawk" Bradshaw until Mantel was released in December 1996.

=== United States Wrestling Association (1989–1997) ===
In 1989, Mantel worked in the Memphis-based promotion United States Wrestling Association where he was a well known star for the company. He was the last USWA Unified World Heavyweight Champion defeating Jerry Lawler on August 8, 1997, in a Title vs All Body Hair match. Mantel kept his body hair. The title was vacated in November 1997 when the promotion closed its doors.

=== World Wrestling Council and International Wrestling Association (1996–2003) ===
After departing the WWF, Mantel later joined the Puerto Rican World Wrestling Council as a wrestler and booker. Then he went to WWC rival promotion International Wrestling Association as a creative consultant, which included writing/producing and booking four hours of original TV programming per week. Mantel remained there until September 22, 2003. Mantel set a record while in Puerto Rico (IWA), in the number of hours that a single writer produced a TV wrestling show as he was responsible for four hours a week, 52 weeks a year, for a total of 208 hours a year for five years straight. His ratings also set records as his shows regularly ranged in the 12 to 15 range, with his highest being an 18.1, with a 55 share of the TV viewing audience while working for WWC in 2000.

=== Total Nonstop Action Wrestling (2003–2009) ===
In 2003, Mantel began work behind the scenes as a writer/producer/agent for TNA Total Nonstop Action Wrestling and as a full-time member of the booking/creative team. Mantel was instrumental in several successful creations for the company, most notably the TNA Knockouts division that helped to reinvigorate interest in women's wrestling in the United States.

Mantel is credited with bringing Awesome Kong to TNA at Bound for Glory 2007, along with her handler/manager, Raisha Saeed.

On July 31, 2009, Mantel was released from TNA due to creative differences. Soon after, he returned to the IWA, once again working as a writer.

=== Independent circuit (2009–2012) ===
In November 2009, Reno Riggins, announced that Dutch would be joining Showtime All-Star Wrestling promotion out of Nashville as a writer and on air talent. In December 2009, Mantel released his first book, "The World According to Dutch." Mantel wrote the book in around 5 weeks, while sitting on a beach on Isla Verde, Puerto Rico, with assistance from editors Ric Gross and Mark James. In December 2010, Mantel released his second book "Tales From a Dirt Road".

On March 3, 2011, Mantel wrestled in the place of Jamie Dundee at XCW Midwest in Corydon IN. He took on local heel Lone Star, further cementing his semi-active status as a part-time wrestler. On March 22, 2011, Mantel was added to the April 4, 2011 WrestleMania morning WrestleReunion event in Atlanta, Georgia. The event honored Bruno Sammartino with several modern and legendary wrestlers including Carlito, Kamala, Scott Steiner, Tommy Dreamer, Christy Hemme, Bob Orton, Nikolai Volkoff and The Iron Sheik.

=== Return to WWE (2013–2016) ===
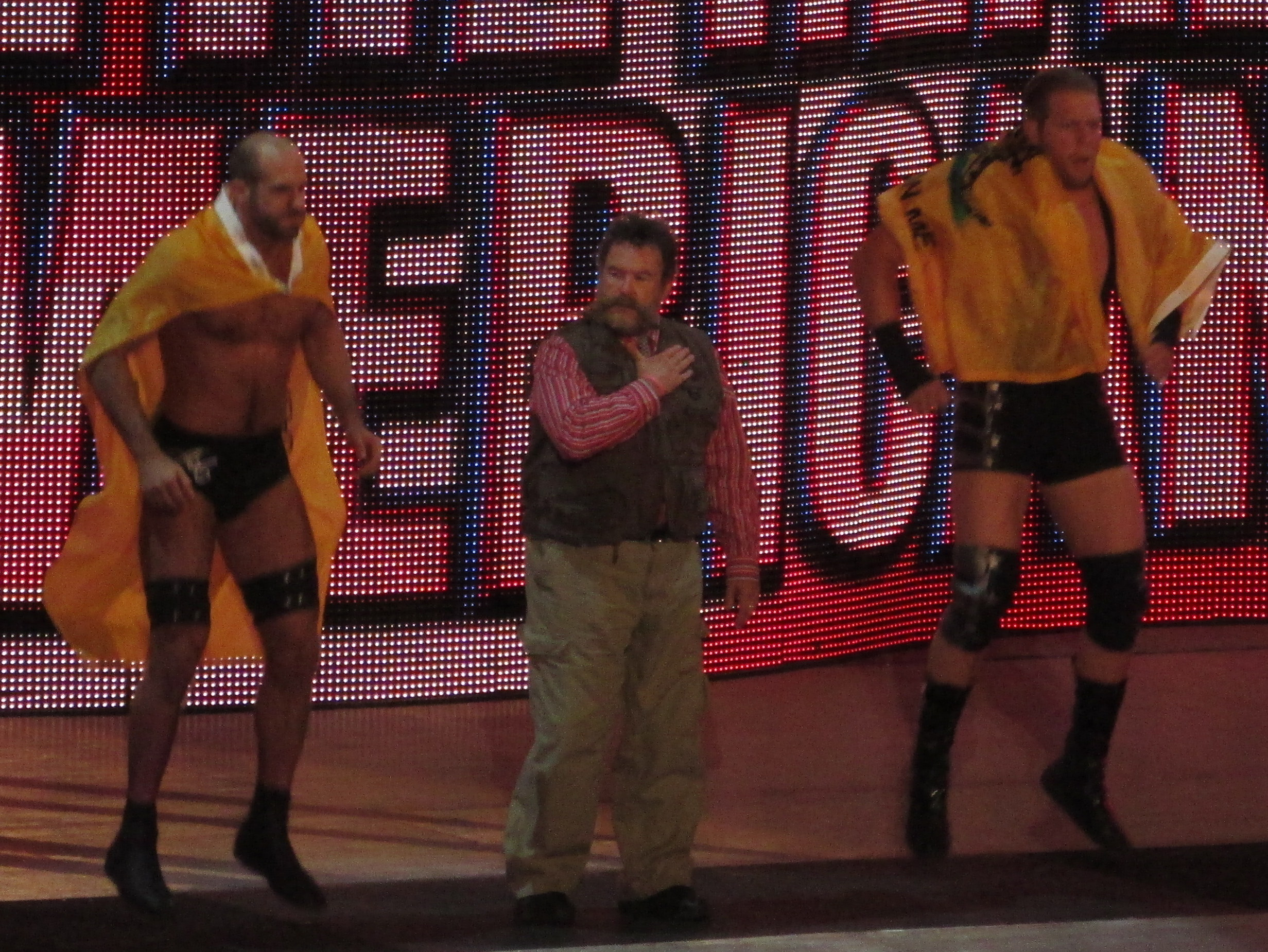
Mantel (center) with The Real Americans, Antonio Cesaro (left) and Jack Swagger

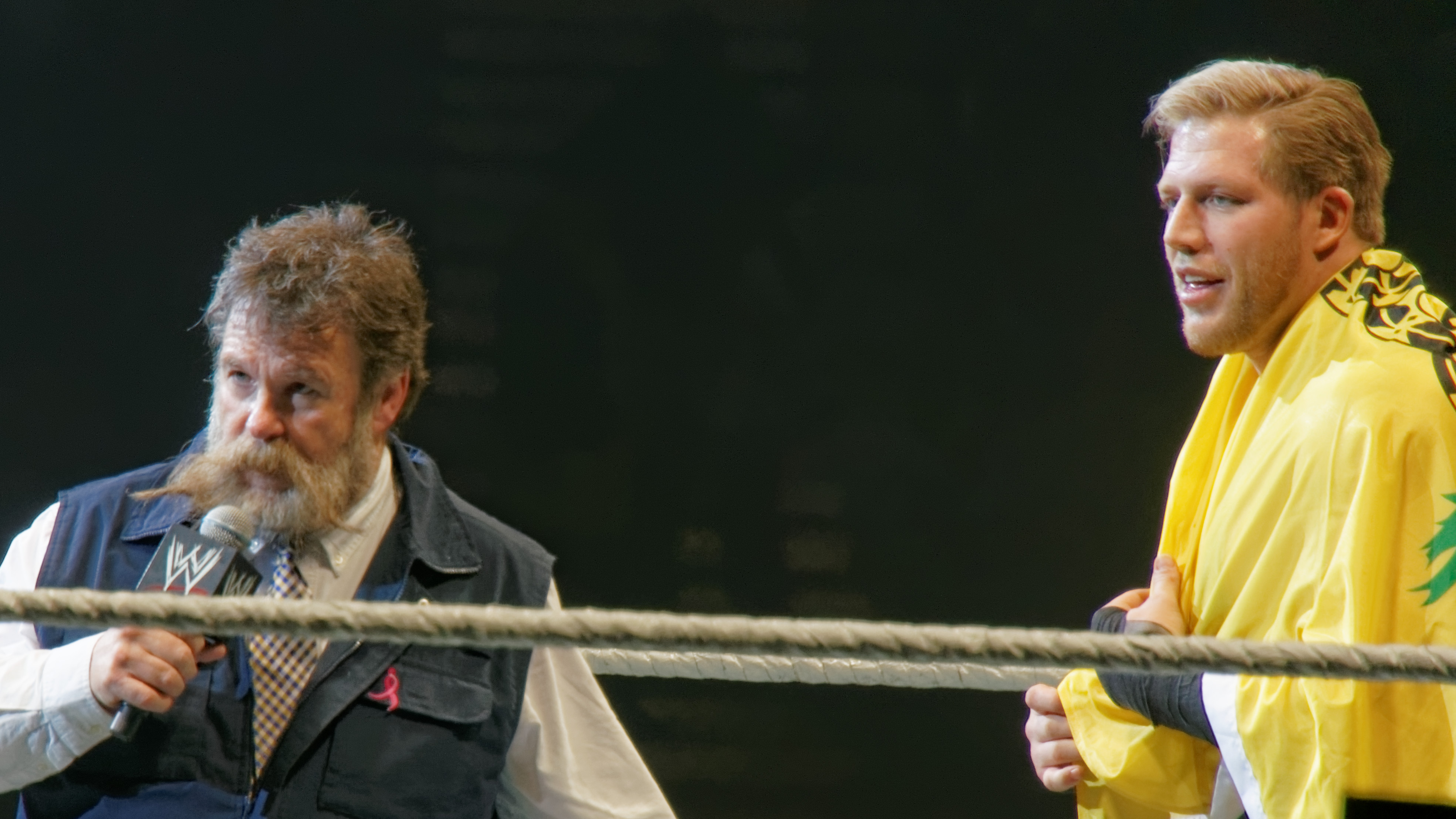
Mantel returned to WWE in 2013 as Jack Swagger's manager, Zeb Colter

On February 11, 2013, Mantel, under the ringname of Zeb Colter, returned to WWE as the manager of Jack Swagger. Colter's character was that of a heel caricature of the Tea Party movement who strongly advocated anti-illegal immigrant beliefs. On February 19, Fox News and various right-wing commentators including Glenn Beck claimed that Swagger and Colter's characters were a mockery of the Tea Party movement meant to "demonize" the Tea Party. WWE responded to the criticism by stating that they were incorporating "current events into [their] storylines" to "create compelling and relevant content for [their] audience" and that "this storyline in no way represents WWE’s political point of view". WWE followed by having Swagger and Colter break character during a video to invite Beck to appear on Raw while justifying that the storyline was designed to elicit a crowd response for the protagonist, Alberto Del Rio, and the antagonists, Swagger and Colter. Beck rejected the invitation. On the April 8 episode of Raw, Colter teamed with Swagger in a Handicap match against Del Rio, though Colter never officially entered the ring, they were defeated by Del Rio by submission on Swagger. On the April 29 episode of Raw, Colter was involved in a triple-threat match with Rodriguez and Big E Langston (representing Dolph Ziggler), with the winner being able to determine the stipulation for the World Heavyweight Championship match at Extreme Rules. Colter lost the match after being pinned by Rodriguez.

On the June 17 episode of Raw, after Jack Swagger suffered a hand injury, Colter aligned himself with Antonio Cesaro. Colter later paired Swagger and Cesaro as "The Real Americans". The Real Americans experienced little success, losing to Los Matadores at Hell in a Cell PPV and a Fatal 4-Way tag team match at TLC. Cesaro dumped Colter as his manager on the Raw following WrestleMania XXX, instead revealing that he was a new client of Paul Heyman. Colter also started a feud with Paul Heyman, after accusing Heyman of "stealing" Cesaro from him. With The Real Americans dissolved, Swagger and Colter turned face by confronting Lana and Rusev. At SummerSlam, Colter was attacked by Rusev, leaving him off television for two weeks. On the December 1 episode of Raw, Colter's leg was broken by Rusev, writing Colter off of television for nearly 11 months.

In a storyline described by Rolling Stone as "the wildly unpopular MexAmerica storyline", Colter returned at Hell in a Cell 2015, utilizing a mobility scooter, where he announced that the returning Alberto Del Rio would answer John Cena's Open Challenge for Cena's United States Championship, where Del Rio was victorious. The next night on Raw, Del Rio and Colter began advertising a union between the United States and Mexico as "MexAmerica", leading to several confrontations with Colter's former protege, Jack Swagger. After Colter caused Del Rio to stumble during one of these confrontations on the December 7 episode of Raw, Del Rio ended his association with Colter. This marked his last appearance in WWE, as he was released from his WWE contract on May 6, 2016.

=== Return to the independent circuit (2016−present) ===
Following his release from WWE, it was confirmed that Mantel signed to appear at a show co-promoted by Global Force Wrestling and WrestlePro on June 11, 2016.

=== Return to Impact Wrestling (2017) ===
In January 2017, it was announced that Mantel would be working as a creative consultant for Impact Wrestling. In February 2017, his role was changed from creative consultant to head of the creative team. Mantel left Impact Wrestling in December 2017 after Don Callis and Scott D'Amore took over as Executive Vice Presidents.

== In media ==
Keown regularly appeared as Zeb Colter in the WWE web series The JBL and Cole Show, until its cancellation in June 2015.

Keown has appeared in two WWE video games as a manager (as Zeb Colter). He made his in-game debut at WWE 2K15 and appears in WWE 2K16.

In 2019, Keown narrated 5 episodes in season 1 of Dark Side of the Ring.

=== Podcasting ===
As of May 2022, Mantell stars in a weekly podcast and YouTube show called Story Time with Dutch Mantell on the Wrestling Shoot Interviews Network, with producer and creator James Romero as its host. The show sees Mantell and Romero discuss current events and happenings within professional wrestling, as well as Mantell's several decades as a wrestler and manager with various promotions.

The duo also produce a second show called Ask Dutch Anything, in which Mantell answer questions that are submitted by fans of their primary show.

== Personal life ==
Keown is a fan of the Clemson Tigers football team.

In August 2012, Keown stated that his 16-year-old granddaughter Amelia had died in a car crash. On June 3, 2014, Tennessee Governor Bill Haslam signed into law Amelia's Law, which requires parolees whose crimes were related to drugs or alcohol to wear a transdermal monitoring device that would test the wearer's blood every 30 minutes. The bill, the first of its kind in the United States, had been pushed by Keown's family and went into effect July 1, 2014.

In November 2024, a GoFundMe appeal was launched to help Mantel and his family pay for medical bills after he and his wife had a series of stays in hospital due to serious health issues including sepsis.

== Championships and accomplishments ==
- All-South Wrestling Alliance
  - ASWA Georgia Junior Heavyweight Championship (2 times)
- Central States Wrestling
  - NWA World Tag Team Championship (Central States version) (2 times) – with Ron Bass
- Dyersburg Championship Wrestling
  - DCW Heavyweight Championship (1 time)
- Georgia Championship Wrestling
  - NWA Georgia Junior Heavyweight Championship (1 time)
- Hoosier Pro Wrestling
  - HPW Heavyweight Championship (1 time)
- Mid-South Wrestling Association
  - Mid-South Television Championship (1 time)
- Mid-South Wrestling Association (Tennessee)
  - MSWA Tennessee Heavyweight Championship (1 time)
- NWA Mid-America / Continental Wrestling Association
  - AWA Southern Heavyweight Championship (5 times)
  - AWA Southern Tag Team Championship (3 times) – with Bill Dundee (1), Koko Ware (1) and Tommy Rich (1)
  - CWA Heavyweight Championship (3 times)
  - CWA International Heavyweight Championship (2 times)
  - CWA World Tag Team Championship (2 times) – with Austin Idol
  - NWA Mid-America Heavyweight Championship (12 times)
  - NWA Mid-America Tag Team Championship (2 times) – with Gypsy Joe (1) and Ken Lucas (1)
  - NWA Mid-America Television Championship (1 time)
  - NWA Southern Tag Team Championship (Mid-America version) (1 time) – with David Schultz
  - NWA Tennessee Tag Team Championship (2 times) – with John Foley
  - NWA United States Tag Team Championship (Mid-America version) (1 time) – with John Foley
- NWA Southeastern Championship Wrestling / NWA Continental Championship Wrestling
  - NWA Continental Heavyweight Championship (1 time)
  - NWA Southeastern Heavyweight Championship (Northern Division) (1 time)
  - NWA Southeastern Television Championship (1 time)
- Pro Wrestling Illustrated
  - Ranked No. 103 of the top 500 singles wrestlers in the PWI 500 in 1992
- Rolling Stone
  - Least Compelling Comeback of the Year (2015)
- United States Wrestling Association
  - USWA Unified World Heavyweight Championship (1 time)
- World Wrestling Council
  - WWC North American Tag Team Championship (4 times) – with Frankie Laine (3) and Dennis Condrey (1)
  - WWC Universal Heavyweight Championship (1 time)
  - WWC World Tag Team Championship (1 time) – with Bouncer Bruno
  - WWC World Television Championship (1 time)
  - WWC Caribbean Tag Team Championship (1 time) - with Wendell Cooley

== Bibliography ==
- The World According to Dutch (2009) – with Ric Gross and Mark James.
- Tales from a Dirt Road (2010) – with Ric Gross and Mark James.
