= Ron Wright (wrestler) =

American professional wrestler (1938–2015)

Personal information
- Born: October 26, 1938 Rogersville, Tennessee, U.S.
- Died: April 21, 2015 (aged 76) Kingsport, Tennessee, U.S.
- Spouse: Teresa Wright

Professional wrestling career
- Ring name(s): Ron Wright; Crusher (official ring name); Bonecrusher (nickname); Kingsport's Bad Boy (nickname); Backstreet Brawler (nickname)
- Debut: January 21, 1956
- Retired: August 12, 1995

Ron Wright (October 26, 1938 – April 21, 2015) was an American professional wrestler, promoter and manager. He wrestled and managed primarily for territory promotions in the Southeastern United States from the 1950s until the 1990s, particularly in the Tennessee and Kentucky areas, including for National Wrestling Alliance, Southeast Championship Wrestling, Continental Wrestling Association, Continental Championship Wrestling, Mid-Atlantic Championship Wrestling and Smoky Mountain Wrestling.

== Professional wrestling career ==
Ron Wright started wrestling in 1956 with his real life friend and future wrestling opponent Whitey Caldwell as well as his brother Don Wright, following an amateur start at the Kingsport Boys Club. Ron Wright and Caldwell, already a local athletic hero, soon caught the eye of Kingsport NWA promoter Mickey Baarnes as well as outlaw Buddy Russels for whom they made their debut on January 21, 1956. Both debuted as teenagers with a younger Ron Wright mostly working as a referee for Baarnes while the older Caldwell quickly made a name as a wrestler. Ron Wright gained a reputation for being a wrestling heel when in 1961 he seriously and legitimately injured Caldwell (putting him out of action for a year) who was by then a very popular wrestling babyface and television champion.

One of Ron Wright's early opponents was Japanese legendary wrestler Antonio Inoki during Inoki's early career and stay in Kingsport in 1966. In the late 1970s Ron Wright and local wrestlers competed hard in the Tennessee area with the Poffo family, a member of which was another international wrestling legend, Randy Savage, with actual fights, death threats and talent poaching occurring regularly during their legitimate feud.

During his career Ron Wright was the most hated heel in his territory (area where wrestling promoters and wrestlers operated) for almost three decades, engaging in extremely physical, violent and bloody matches, mostly as part of a tag team and often with his brother Don Wright. His most well-known and frequent opponent was Caldwell who he would try to provoke to genuine anger in order to make their bouts better. He was known not only for being a nefarious cheat and bully but also for his speaking ability, both as a wrestler and as a manager, with a style based on local preachers. Despite mostly wrestling as a heel, he did however appear as a face in a tribute match for Whitey Caldwell after his friend's death at the hands of a drunk driver in 1972.

By the end of the 1970s Ron Wright had mostly transitioned to an on-screen management role while becoming an off-screen secret owner of his local territory (the Kingsport, Bristol and Johnson City region in Tennessee, i.e. Tri-City area, part of the future Southeastern Championship Wrestling territory).

He suffered a serious injury at the beginning of the 80s and disappeared from wrestling as a wrestler, manager and promoter until 1987 when he came back as a manager in Continental Championship Wrestling, then USA Championship Wrestling, and later in Smoky Mountain Wrestling.

His ability to draw heat was so great that he was legitimately shot at three times by fans as well as being slashed with razor, resulting in a wound that requires 160 stitches. He also had his personal small plane burnt by persons unknown, possibly wrestling fans (Wright himself believed that the plane was burnt to cover up the theft of expensive parts). Wright noted, with regret, that he had caused four or five elderly spectators to have heart attacks over his antics.

== Personal life ==
Ron Wright was married to Teresa Wright. He would race go-carts that he built as an avid mechanic, with his children. Ron Wright worked as a pressman alongside his wrestling career and during hiatuses. Despite making a substantial living as a wrestler, Ron kept his job to have benefits for his children in case of injury, as his wrestling trainer had suffered an early career ending injury. He was well known for his charity work in Kingsport. Ron Wright was a noted thrill seeker who piloted his own plane and was known for driving wildly, leading to an incident when a traffic stop cop jokingly demanded Ron's pilot license over the speed he was driving, and Ron in turn presented his real license.

== Professional wrestling persona ==
- Crusher (official ring name)
- Bonecrusher (nickname)
- Kingsport's Bad Boy (nickname)
- Backstreet Brawler (nickname)
- King of Kingsport and Number One Hillbilly (Smokey Mountain Wrestling nickname)

=== Notable opponents ===
- Boris Malenko
- Verne Gagne
- Ron Fuller (wrestler)
- Killer Kowalski
- Blackjack Mulligan
- Kevin Sullivan
- Dory Funk Jr.
- Whitey Caldwell
- Danny Hodge
- Ron Garvin
- Antonio Inoki
- Rocky Smith
- Louie Tillet
- Lester Welch
- The Assassins
- Jim Cornette

=== Wrestlers managed ===
- Mongolian Stomper
- Phil Hickerson
- Moondog Spot
- Dennis Condrey
- Jim Dalton
- Dirty White Boy

=== Gimmicks ===
As an active wrestler, Ron Wright would use weapons including a custom-made knucklebuster with a blade to legitimately cut his opponents in the ring and cause them to bleed profusely. He called this his "chisel". Faced with a violent assault from Wright, a young scared rookie Kevin Sullivan in what he believed was actual self-defense tried to knock out Wright in the ring with a chain to which the veteran Wright replied with laughter and congratulations. He is also known for using a loaded boot, which wrestlers like Tony Anthony, The Grappler, Tom Prichard and Raven would use in later years.

As a manager, Ron Wright would pretend to have a heart condition and implore fans not to distress him with loud sounds which would lead them to making as much noise as possible, in the hope of causing him a heart attack.

In his later career as a manager, Ron Wright would constantly claim to have been a "scientific", "Christian" wrestler which would mean a face in 1980s wrestling terminology and claim never to have hurt an opponent despite being widely known to generations of audiences as one of the most violent, nefarious and cheating heels during his days as an active wrestler, especially in light of Whitey Caldwell's first and real injury.

As a manager in Continental Championship Wrestling, Wright would illegally interfere in matches handing heels weapons, distracting the referee or physically hindering or assaulting face opponents. Next as a manager in Smoky Mountain Wrestling (run by Jim Cornette), a still relatively young (in his mid fifties) Ron Wright would develop his character further and appear in a wheelchair claiming that he needed to find a wrestler (eventually mainly Dirty White Boy but with help from other heels) to manage, in order to make enough money for hip and heart operations, while still continuing his illegal ringside activities to the ire of commissioner Bob Armstrong, and heel manager Jim Cornette.

== Championships and accomplishments ==
- National Wrestling Alliance
  - NWA Hall of Fame (class of 2015)
- NWA Mid-America
  - NWA Tennessee Tag Team Championship (21 times) – with Don Wright (14), Frank Morrell (2), Whitey Caldwell (1), Jack Donovan (2), Tommy Gilbert (1), & Nelson Royal (1)
  - NWA Southeastern Heavyweight Championship (5 times)
  - NWA Southern Junior Heavyweight Championship
  - NWA World Tag Team Championship (1 time) – with Don Wright
  - NWA Southern Heavyweight Championship (1 time)
  - NWA United States Tag Team Championship (1 time) – with Frank Morrell
  - NWA Southern Tag Team Championship
  - NWA Southern Junior Heavyweight Championship
- Southern Championship Wrestling
  - NWA Tennessee Brass Knuckles Championship (2 times)
