= CWA World Tag Team Championship =

Professional wrestling tag team championship

Details
- Promotion: Continental Wrestling Association
- Date established: July 28, 1980
- Date retired: November 28, 1983
Statistics
- First champions: Jerry Jarrett and Tojo Yamamoto
- Final champions: Austin Idol and Dutch Mantel
- Most reigns: (as team) The Assassins (4 times)
- Longest reign: Austin Idol and Dutch Mantel (122 days)
- Shortest reign: Ken Raper and Robert Reed (2 days)

The CWA World Tag Team Championship was a major professional wrestling tag team title defended in the Continental Wrestling Association. It lasted from 1980 through 1983.

== Title history ==
Key
No.	Overall reign number
Reign	Reign number for the specific champion
Days	Number of days held

No.	Champion	Championship change			Reign statistics		Notes	Ref.
No.	Champion	Date	Event	Location	Reign	Days	Notes	Ref.
1	Jerry Jarrett and Tojo Yamamoto	July 14, 1980	House show	Memphis, Tennessee	1	21	Defeated Austin Idol and Dutch Mantel in a tournament final to become the first champions.	
2	Austin Idol and Dutch Mantel	August 4, 1980	House show	Memphis, Tennessee	1	220		
3	Bill Dundee and Tommy Rich	March 12, 1981	House show	Lexington, Kentucky	1	(Note: The exact length of the championship reign is too uncertain to calculate.)		
4	The Rock 'n' Roll Express (Robert Gibson and Ricky Morton)	1981	House show	(Note: The location of the championship match was not captured as part of the documentation.)	1			
—	Deactivated	1981	—	—	—	—		
5	The Assassins (Don Bass and Roger Smith)	July 18, 1983	House show	Memphis, Tennessee	1	21	Billed as champions upon arrival in the CWA.	
6	Austin Idol (2) and Jerry Lawler	August 8, 1983	House show	Memphis, Tennessee	1	7		
7	The Assassins (Don Bass and Roger Smith)	August 15, 1983	House show	Memphis, Tennessee	2	43		
8	The Fabulous Ones (Steve Keirn and Stan Lane)	September 27, 1983	House show		1	27		
9	The Assassins (Don Bass and Roger Smith)	October 24, 1983	House show	Memphis, Tennessee	3	5		
10	Ken Raper and Robert Reed	October 29, 1983	House show	Memphis, Tennessee	1	2		
11	The Assassins (Don Bass and Roger Smith)	October 31, 1983	House show	Memphis, Tennessee	4	7		
12	The Fabulous Ones (Steve Keirn and Stan Lane)	November 7, 1983	House show	Memphis, Tennessee	2	7		
13	The Midnight Express (Norvell Austin and Dennis Condrey)	November 14, 1983	House show	Memphis, Tennessee	1	7		
14	Austin Idol (3) and Dutch Mantel	November 21, 1983	House show	Memphis, Tennessee	2	7		
—	Deactivated	November 28, 1983	—	—	—	—	Idol and Mantel split up, championship not referred to after this date.	

== See also ==
- Continental Wrestling Association
- CWA Tag Team Championship
