= Don Bass =

Don Bass may refer to:

- Don Bass (American football) (1956–1989), American football player
- Don Bass (wrestler) (1946–2016), American professional wrestler
