= NWA Arkansas Heavyweight Championship =

Details
- Promotion: NWA Tri-State
- Date established: March 14, 1939
- Date retired: 1979
Statistics
- First champion(s): Alfred Williams
- Final champion(s): Charlie Cook

The NWA Arkansas Heavyweight Championship was a professional wrestling championship sanctioned by the National Wrestling Alliance and defended in its Arkansas territory.

== Title history ==
Key
Symbol	Meaning
No.	The overall championship reign
Reign	The reign number for the specific wrestler listed.
Event	The event in which the championship changed hands
N/A	The specific information is not known
—	Used for vacated reigns in order to not count it as an official reign
	Indicates that there was a period where the lineage is undocumented due to the lack of written documentation

No.	Champion	Reign	Date	Days held	Location	Event	Notes	Ref(s).
1	Alfred Williams	1	March 14, 1939	(Note: The length of the championship reign is too uncertain to calculate.)	N/A	live event	Claimed both heavyweight and junior heavyweight titles.	
2	Dizzy Davis	1	December 30, 1954		Little Rock, Arkansas	live event	Defeated Antone Leone	
3	Rock Montez	1	November 1960		N/A	live event	Defeated Joe Deston.	
4	Jack Brisco	1	1960s		N/A	live event	Records are unclear on how he won the championship	
5	Chuck Karbo	1	June 26, 1970	−96	N/A	live event		
6	Jerry Miller	1	March 22, 1970		N/A	live event		
7	Ernie Ladd	1	October 28, 1978	5	Little Rock, Arkansas	live event	Won a tournament to win the title.	
8	Ray Candy	1	November 2, 1978	70	Little Rock, Arkansas	live event		
9	Ron Bass	1	January 11, 1979	72	Little Rock, Arkansas	live event		
10	Charlie Cook	1	March 24, 1979		Little Rock, Arkansas	live event		
—	Vacated, later abandoned	—	1979	—	N/A	N/A	Championship vacated after Cook was injured. Abandoned when Bill Watts bought NWA Tri-State and renamed it Mid-South Wrestling	

== See also ==
- National Wrestling Alliance
