= Sam Bass (wrestler) =

American professional wrestler (1935–1976)

Personal information
- Born: Fred Wright Bass; April 19, 1935 Tennessee, U.S.
- Died: July 27, 1976 (aged 41) Dickson, Tennessee, U.S.

Professional wrestling career
- Ring name(s): Sam Bass; Fred Bass
- Debut: 1960

Fred Wright "Sam" Bass (April 19, 1935 – July 27, 1976), best known by his ring name, Sam Bass, was an American professional wrestler and manager who often managed Jerry Lawler.

== Professional wrestling career ==
Bass began his wrestling career around 1960.

In 1972, Bass began managing Jerry Lawler and Jim White for NWA Mid-America. Both Lawler and Wright won many tag titles until they separated in 1974. Bass was the one who dubbed Jerry "the King" Lawler as "The King of Wrestling". Bass continued to managed Lawler until 1975 when Lawler became a babyface.

Bass later on managed wrestlers like Ron Bass, the Wright Brothers, and others.

== Death ==
On July 27, 1976, Bass, along with wrestlers Frank Hester and Pepe Lopez were traveling by car between shows in Nashville and Memphis, Tennessee on Interstate 40 in Dickson County, Tennessee. According to Jerry Lawler, Bass (who was driving) was speeding at over 100 miles per hour when Bass’s car struck a tractor trailer and crashed into a bridge. Bass, Hester and Lopez all died in the crash.

== Championships and accomplishments ==
- Kingsport Wrestling Hall of Fame
  - Class of 1999
- NWA Mid-America
  - NWA Tennessee Tag Team Championship (21 times) – with Don Wright
