= NWA United States Tag Team Championship (Mid-America version) =

Professional wrestling tag team championship

Details
- Promotion: NWA Mid-America
- Date established: March 6, 1962
- Date retired: 1976
Statistics
- First champions: Yoshinosato and Taru Sakuro
- Most reigns: The Bicentennial Kings (Dennis Condrey and Phil Hickerson; 5 reigns)

The Mid-America version of the NWA United States Tag Team Championship was a professional wrestling tag team championship and promoted by the National Wrestling Alliance (NWA)'s NWA Mid-America territory from 1962 until 1976. The title was intended solely for tag teams in tag team matches, not individuals, and was the secondary tag team championship in NWA Mid-America, with the Mid-America version of the NWA World Tag Team Championship being the primary championship. The promotion also had a third tag team championship at its peak, a testament to the popularity of tag team wrestling in the territory, as they promoted the NWA Mid-America Tag Team Championship as well. The championship was established around March 6, 1962, when Yoshinosato and Taro Sakuro were named champions upon arrival by NWA Mid-America instead of holding a tournament to establish the championship. With a number of NWA territories active at the time this version of the United States Tag Team Championship was one of at least six championships that shared the same name under the NWA's supervision. The team of Dennis Condrey and Phil Hickerson, also known as "The Bicentennial Kings", held the championship the most times, five in total including the last reign when the titles were abandoned in 1976. Because the championship was a professional wrestling championship, it was not won or lost competitively but instead by the decision of the bookers of a wrestling promotion. The championship was awarded after the chosen wrestler "won" a match to maintain the illusion that professional wrestling is a competitive sport.

== Title history ==
Key
No.	Overall reign number
Reign	Reign number for the specific team—reign numbers for the individuals are in parentheses, if different
Days	Number of days held

No.	Champion	Championship change			Reign statistics		Notes	Ref.
No.	Champion	Date	Event	Location	Reign	Days	Notes	Ref.
1	Yoshinosato and Taro Sakuro	March 6, 1962		N/A	1	84	Billed as champions upon arrival.	
2	Lester Welch and Danny Hodge	May 29, 1962	Live event	Nashville, Tennessee	1	32		
3	Bad Boy Hines and Billy Boy Hines	June 30, 1962	Live event	Chattanooga, Tennessee	1	(Note: The date the championship was lost has not been documented which means the championship reign lasted anywhere between 1 day and 2,010 days.)	Still champions on July 12, 1962.	
Championship history is unrecorded from July 12, 1962 to 1967.
4	Les Thatcher and Roger Kirby	1967	Live event	(Note: The location of the match was not captured as part of the championship documentation.)	1	(Note: The date the championship was won and lost has not been documented which means the championship reign lasted anywhere between 1 day and 1,095 days.)		
Championship history is unrecorded from 1967 to 1969.
5	Les Thatcher and Bearcat Brown	1969	Live event	Nashville, Tennessee	1	(Note: The date the championship was won and lost has not been documented which means the championship reign lasted anywhere between 1 day and 364 days.)	Won a tournament to become champions	
Championship history is unrecorded from 1969 to 1969.
6	The Mighty Yankees (Mighty Yankee 1 and Mighty Yankee 2)	1969	Live event		1	(Note: The date the championship was won and lost has not been documented which means the championship reign lasted anywhere between 1 day and 364 days.)		
7	Les Thatcher and Dennis Hall	1969	Live event	Chattanooga, Tennessee	1	(Note: The date the championship was won and lost has not been documented which means the championship reign lasted anywhere between 1 day and 364 days.)		
8	The Mighty Yankees (Mighty Yankee 1 and Mighty Yankee 2)	1969	Live event		2	(Note: The date the championship was won and lost has not been documented which means the championship reign lasted anywhere between 1 day and 484 days.)		
Championship history is unrecorded from 1969 to April 1970.
9	The Interns (Intern #1 and Intern #2)	April 1970	Live event		1	(Note: The date the championship was won has not been documented which means the championship reign lasted anywhere between 2 days and 31 days.)		
10	The Continental Warriors (Bobby Hart and Lorenzo Parente)	May 2, 1970	Live event	Chattanooga, Tennessee	1	16		
	The Interns (Intern #1 and Intern #2)	May 18, 1970	Live event		2	(Note: The date the championship was lost has not been documented which means the championship reign lasted anywhere between 75 days and 105 days.)		
Championship history is unrecorded from May 18, 1970 to August 1970.
12	Ron Wright and Frank Morrell	August 1970	Live event		1	(Note: The date the championship was won and lost has not been documented which means the championship reign lasted anywhere between 1 day and 25 days.)		
13	Al Greene and Frank Martinez	August 26, 1970	Live event	Nashville, Tennessee	1	14	Greene defeated Morrell on behalf of the team	
14	Johnny Walker and Oni Maiva	September 9, 1970	Live event	Nashville, Tennessee	1	14		
15	The Continental Warriors (Bobby Hart and Lorenzo Parente)	September 23, 1970	Live event	Nashville, Tennessee	2	(Note: The date the championship was lost has not been documented which means the championship reign lasted anywhere between 1 day and 68 days.)	Still champions on October 2, 1970	
Championship history is unrecorded from September 23, 1970 to November 1970.
16	Dennis Hall and Mighty Atlas	November 1970	Live event		1	(Note: The date the championship was won and lost has not been documented which means the championship reign lasted anywhere between 1 day and 16 days.)		
17	Big Bad John and Pepe Lopez	November 17, 1970	Live event		1	71		
18	Len Rossi and Bearcat Brown	January 27, 1971	Live event	Nashville, Tennessee	1	(Note: The date the championship was won and lost has not been documented which means the championship reign lasted anywhere between 1 day and 1,492 days.)		
Championship history is unrecorded from January 27, 1971 to February 28, 1975.
19	Dutch Mantell and John Foley	February 28, 1975	Live event		1	(Note: The date the championship was lost has not been documented which means the championship reign lasted anywhere between 15 days and 28 days.)	Still Champions on March 14, 1975	
20	Les Thatcher and Nelson Royal	March 28, 1975 (NLT)	Live event		1	(Note: The date the championship was won and lost has not been documented which means the championship reign lasted anywhere between 7 days and 65 days.)	Still champions on April 4, 1975	
Championship history is unrecorded from March 28, 1975 to May 5, 1975.
21	Ron Bass and Don Bass	May 5, 1975	Live event		1	(Note: The date the championship was won and lost has not been documented which means the championship reign lasted anywhere between 1 day and 26 days.)		
Championship history is unrecorded from May 5, 1975 to May 1975.
22	Rocket Monroe and Randy Tyler	May 1975	Live event		1	(Note: The date the championship was won and lost has not been documented which means the championship reign lasted anywhere between 1 day and 16 days.)		
23	Jackie Fargo and George Gulas	May 17, 1975	Live event	Chattanooga, Tennessee	1	9		
24	Karl Von Steiger and Otto Von Heller	May 26, 1975	Live event	Nashville, Tennessee	1	82		
25	Tojo Yamamoto and Tommy Rich	August 16, 1975	Live event	Chattanooga, Tennessee	1	(Note: The date the championship was won and lost has not been documented which means the championship reign lasted anywhere between 1 day and 23 days.)		
26	The Bicentennial Kings (Phil Hickerson and Dennis Condrey)	September 1975	Live event		1	(Note: The date the championship was won and lost has not been documented which means the championship reign lasted anywhere between 1 day and 8 days.)		
27	Robert Fuller and Ron Fuller	September 9, 1975	Live event	Memphis, Tennessee	1	27		
28	The Bicentennial Kings (Phil Hickerson and Dennis Condrey)	October 6, 1975	Live event		2	21		
29	Jackie Fargo and Don Carson	October 27, 1975	Live event	Birmingham, Alabama	1	18		
30	The Bicentennial Kings (Phil Hickerson and Dennis Condrey)	November 14, 1975	Live event		3	5		
31	Jackie Fargo and Jerry Lawler	November 19, 1975	Live event	Nashville, Tennessee	1	(Note: The date the championship was won and lost has not been documented which means the championship reign lasted anywhere between 12 days and 42 days.)		
32	The Bicentennial Kings (Phil Hickerson and Dennis Condrey)	December 1975	Live event		4	(Note: The date the championship was won and lost has not been documented which means the championship reign lasted anywhere between 1 day and 40 days.)		
Championship history is unrecorded from December 1975 to January 10, 1976.
33	The Wild Samoans (Afa and Sika)	January 10, 1976	Live event		1	98	Still Champions on February 5, 1976	
34	The Bicentennial Kings (Phil Hickerson and Dennis Condrey)	April 17, 1976	Live event		5	(Note: The date the championship was abandoned has not been documented which means the championship reign lasted anywhere between 12 days and 258 days.)	Still Champions on April 29, 1976	
—	Deactivated	1976	—	—	—	—		

== See also ==
- List of National Wrestling Alliance championships
