= Bob Caudle =

American professional wrestling announcer (1930-2025)

- Born: August 2, 1930; Charlotte, North Carolina, U.S.
- Died: November 16, 2025 (aged 95)
- Occupation: Broadcaster

Bob Caudle (August 2, 1930 – November 16, 2025) was an American professional wrestling announcer most notable for his time with the National Wrestling Alliance (NWA). He started working with Jim Crockett Promotions in the late 1950s for promoter Jim Crockett, Sr. Throughout the 1970s and 1980s, Caudle was the official voice of Mid-Atlantic Championship Wrestling and is known for his trademark greeting, "Hello wrestling fans...", and his trademark sign-off line, "That'll do it for this week. We'll see you next week, and until then, so long for now." He is known for constantly addressing the viewers as "fans" many times on each episode.

In addition to his role as a wrestling announcer, Caudle also served as a major political aide to North Carolina Republican U.S. Senator Jesse Helms from 1980 to 1996.

== Broadcast career ==
=== NWA Mid-Atlantic Championship Wrestling ===
His television broadcasting career began in Wilmington, North Carolina. He then moved to another broadcasting position in Savannah, Georgia. While in Savannah in the late 1950s, Caudle hosted a televised studio wrestling show.

Caudle was the weatherman at WRAL-TV in Raleigh, North Carolina, where NWA Atlantic Coast Wrestling was taped every week. Caudle continued as both the weatherman for WRAL and the voice of NWA Atlantic Coast Wrestling for many years. Caudle continued to host the flagship program which was renamed NWA Mid-Atlantic Championship Wrestling in 1973 (after the death of Jim Crockett, Sr.). Caudle had many "sidekicks" over the years including David Crockett and Johnny Weaver. In 1986, his show changed its name to NWA Pro Wrestling. In 1988, Jim Ross joined the show.

Caudle hosted the syndicated All-Star Wrestling, Wide World Wrestling, Mid-Atlantic Championship Wrestling, and World Wide Wrestling for Jim Crockett Promotions (JCP) and WCW World Wide Wrestling after JCP was purchased by Ted Turner in late 1988. Caudle was also the lead announcer for the closed circuit events known as Starrcade in the 1980s and most of the early NWA/WCW pay per views. He worked several live Clash of the Champions telecasts, as well. Slowly, the promotion grew away from the NWA and became World Championship Wrestling (WCW).

=== Smoky Mountain Wrestling ===
By 1991, Caudle left WCW and joined South Atlantic Pro Wrestling (SAPW) as lead announcer. Within a few months, the promotion closed and Caudle went to work for Jim Cornette's Smoky Mountain Wrestling (SMW). Caudle remained with SMW until October 1994. At one point, Jim Ross left the World Wrestling Federation (WWF) briefly and joined Caudle on the SMW telecasts.

=== NWA reunion shows ===
Caudle continued to make personal appearances at NWA indy events and reunion shows. He suffered two heart attacks on June 14, 2007 but completely recovered and returned to appearing regularly at NWA/Mid-Atlantic Championship Wrestling reunions and other NWA Wrestling events. He introduced Ric Flair at the annual NWA Fanfest in 2009 in Charlotte, North Carolina.

=== Ric Flair's Last Match ===
For Ric Flair's Last Match, a 2022 show run by a revived JCP, Caudle opened the pay-per-view portion and ended the show with his catchphrase "So long for now!"; both segments were pre-recorded.

== Style ==
Caudle was a traditional type of wrestling announcer, meaning that he did not advocate for faces or heels (although he often showed his disgust for cheating). Caudle was not a personality in and of himself, but he let the wrestlers be the stars of the show. As such, he was not involved in angles where heels would attack him. Over the years Caudle was teamed with Bill Ward, David Crockett, Johnny Weaver, Gordon Solie, Les Thatcher, Tony Schiavone, Dutch Mantel, Jim Cornette, and Jim Ross among others.

== Personal life and death ==
Caudle was born in Charlotte, North Carolina on August 2, 1930.

Outside of the wrestling world, Caudle was also active in politics. Caudle, an avowed Republican, contributed to the campaigns of Senator Jesse Helms. He became a legislative assistant for Senator Jesse Helms after he left WRAL in 1980, working in Helms's office in Raleigh. He remained in that position until 1996. Caudle and Helms worked together at WRAL before Helms ran for the United States Senate in 1972.

Caudle was married to his wife Jackie for 76 years until her death on April 24, 2025. They have 3 children, 7 grandchildren, and 12 great-grandchildren.

Caudle died on November 16, 2025, at the age of 95.
