= Bearcat Brown =

American professional wrestler (1935–1996)

Personal information
- Born: Matt Jewel; August 31, 1935 Georgia, U.S.
- Died: April 7, 1996 (aged 60)

Professional wrestling career
- Ring name(s): Bearcat Brown; Fatback Brown; Mystery Man #2
- Billed weight: 245 lb (111 kg)
- Debut: 1961
- Retired: 1981

Matt Jewel (August 31, 1935 – April 7, 1996) was an American professional wrestler who became popular in the 1960s. Despite racial tension in the United States, he became wildly popular as a babyface in Alabama. During his career he teamed with Len Rossi mainly winning various tag team titles.

== Professional wrestling career ==
Brown made his professional wrestling debut in 1961. Early in his career he worked in Kansas City and Georgia. In 1966, Brown made his debut in for NWA Mid-America in Alabama working for Nick Gulas.

In 1969, he became one of the most popular wrestlers to ever appear in Birmingham when he formed a tag-team with Len Rossi and broke the color barrier on Boutwell Auditorium wrestling cards. They won the World Tag Title and packed Boutwell for the next three years with both black and white fans.

In 1972, Rossi was injured in a car accident and retired. Brown would teamed up with Rossi's son Joey.

In 1977, Brown left Alabama and went to Tennessee to work for Continental Wrestling Association. He would retire around 1981.

== Death ==
Brown died on April 7, 1996, at 60.

== Championships and accomplishments ==
- National Wrestling Alliance
  - NWA World Tag Team Championship (Mid-America version) (16 times) – with Len Rossi (7), Les Thatcher (1), Robert Fuller (wrestler) (1), Mr. Wrestling II (1)
  - NWA Mid-America Tag Team Championship (1 time) – with Len Rossi (1)
  - NWA Southern Tag Team Championship (19 times) – with Len Rossi (5), Tommy Gilbert (3)
  - NWA Tennessee Tag Team Championship (6 times) – with Whitey Caldwell (1)
- Southeastern Championship Wrestling – Continental Wrestling Federation
  - NWA Brass Knuckles Championship (Southeastern version) (1 time)
