= CWA Tag Team Championship =

Professional wrestling tag team championship

Details
- Promotion: Continental Wrestling Association
- Date established: February 1, 1988
- Date retired: 1990
Statistics
- First champion(s): Max Pain and Gary Young
- Most reigns: (as team) Max Pain and Gary Young, The Bruise Brothers, Scott Steiner and Billy Travis, & Robert Fuller and Jimmy Golden (2 times) (as individual) Gary Young (4 times)
- Longest reign: Robert Fuller and Jimmy Golden (80 days)
- Shortest reign: Jed Grundy and Scott Steiner (7 days)

The CWA Tag Team Championship was a major professional wrestling tag team title defended in the Continental Wrestling Association. It lasted from 1988 through 1990, when it was abandoned and replaced with the United States Wrestling Association Tag Team Championship.

== Title history ==
Key
No.	Overall reign number
Reign	Reign number for the specific team—reign numbers for the individuals are in parentheses, if different
Days	Number of days held

No.	Champion	Championship change			Reign statistics		Notes	Ref.
No.	Champion	Date	Event	Location	Reign	Days	Notes	Ref.
1	Max Pain and Gary Young	February 1, 1988	House show	Memphis, Tennessee	1	28	Defeated Manny Fernandez and Jeff Jarrett in a tournament final to become the first champions	
2	The Bruise Brothers (Don and Ron)	February 29, 1988	House show	Memphis, Tennessee	1	7		
3	Max Pain and Gary Young	March 7, 1988	House show	Memphis, Tennessee	2	21		
4	The Bruise Brothers (Don and Ron)	March 28, 1988	House show	Memphis, Tennessee	2	42		
5	The Cuban Choir Boys	May 9, 1988	House show	Memphis, Tennessee	1	21		
6	Scott Steiner and Billy Travis	May 30, 1988	House show	Memphis, Tennessee	1	7		
7	Don Bass and Gary Young (2)	June 6, 1988	House show	Memphis, Tennessee	1	21		
8	Scott Steiner and Billy Travis	June 27, 1988	House show	Memphis, Tennessee	2	49		
9	The Rock 'n' Roll RPMs (Mike Davis and Tommy Lane)	August 15, 1988	House show	Memphis, Tennessee	1	66		
—	Vacated	October 20, 1988	House show	Lewisburg, Tennessee	—	—	Championship held up after a match against Bill Dundee and Todd Morton	
10	Cactus Jack and Gary Young (4)	October 24, 1988	House show	Memphis, Tennessee	1	14	Defeated Bill Dundee and Todd Morton in a tournament final to win the vacant championship.	
11	Robert Fuller and Jimmy Golden	November 7, 1988	House show	Memphis, Tennessee	1	103		
12	Jed Grundy and Scott Steiner (3)	February 18, 1989	House show	Memphis, Tennessee	1	7		
13	Robert Fuller and Jimmy Golden	February 25, 1989	House show	Memphis, Tennessee	2			
—	Vacated	March 1989	—	—	—	—	Championship vacated when Golden left the promotion.	
14	John Paul and Tracy Smothers	March 13, 1989	House show	Memphis, Tennessee	1	52	Defeated Robert Fuller and Action Jackson in a tournament final to win the vacant championship	
15	Robert Fuller (3) and Brian Lee	May 4, 1989	House show	Morristown, Tennessee	1	32		
16	Action Jackson and Billy Travis (3)	June 5, 1989	House show	Memphis, Tennessee	1	28		
—	Vacated	July 3, 1989	House show	Memphis, Tennessee	—	—	Championship held up after Jackson and Travis and Wildside fight to a no contest	
17	Wildside (Chris Champion and Mark Starr)	July 10, 1989	House show	Memphis, Tennessee	1	63	Defeated Jackson and Travis in a rematch to win the held up title	
18	The Rock 'n' Roll Express (Robert Gibson and Ricky Morton)	September 11, 1989	House show	Memphis, Tennessee	1			
—	Vacated	November 1989	—	—	—	—	Title vacated when Gibson left the promotion.	
18	The Grappler (Kevin Dillinger) and Brian Lee	December 4, 1989	House show	Memphis, Tennessee	1		Defeated the teams of The New York Brawler and Mike Davis, Ricky and Todd Morton and King Cobra and Frankie Lancaster in a four-team elimination match to win the vacant championship	
—		1990	—	—			Title abandoned and replaced with the USWA Tag Team Championship	

== See also ==
- Continental Wrestling Association
- United States Wrestling Association
- USWA Tag Team Championship
