= Charlie Cook (wrestler) =

American professional wrestler

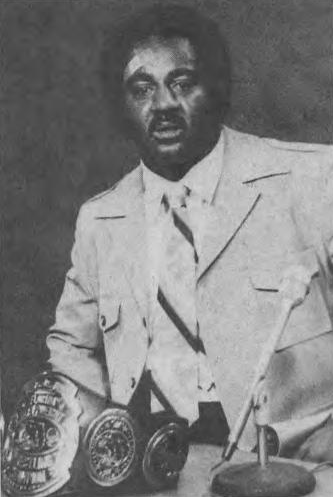
- Cook as NWA Florida Heavyweight Champion, c. 1983

Personal information
- Born: March 2, 1941 Calhoun, Georgia, United States
- Died: January 5, 2020 (aged 78)

Professional wrestling career
- Ring name: Charlie Cook
- Billed height: 6 ft 3 in (191 cm)
- Billed weight: 264 lb (120 kg)

Charles W. "Charlie" Cook was an American professional wrestler who competed in Southeastern regional promotions such as Mid-South Wrestling, Georgia Championship Wrestling, and Championship Wrestling from Florida during the 1970s and 1980s.

== Professional wrestling career ==
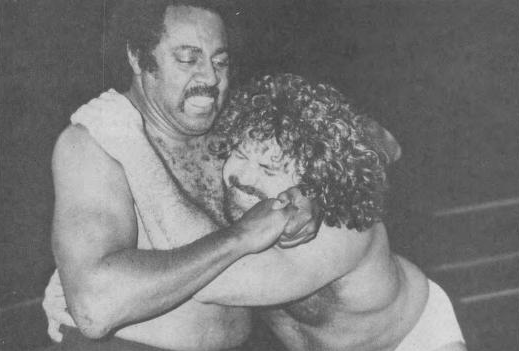
Cook (left) vs Jimmy Garvin (right), c. 1983

On August 11, 1981, Cook was placed in a match as a substitute for Jack Brisco. He defeated Dory Funk, Jr. to win the NWA Florida Heavyweight Championship. He dropped the title to Funk the following month. After regaining the belt, he later lost the title to The Spoiler. The following year, he held the WWC Caribbean Heavyweight Championship but dropped it to Abdullah the Butcher.

Cook was voted second runner up for Pro Wrestling Illustrated''s Most Improved Wrestler of the Year award in 1981.

== Personal life ==
Charlie Cook died on January 8, 2020.

== Championships and accomplishments ==
- Championship Wrestling from Florida
  - NWA Florida Heavyweight Championship (2 times)
- NWA Mid-America
  - NWA World Six-Man Tag Team Championship (1 time) – with Dennis Hall and George Gulas
- NWA Tri-State
  - NWA Arkansas Heavyweight Championship (1 time)
- Southeastern Championship Wrestling
  - NWA Alabama Heavyweight Championship (1 time)
- World Wrestling Council
  - WWC Caribbean Heavyweight Championship (1 time)
