= NWA Tennessee Tag Team Championship =

Professional wrestling tag team championship

Details
- Promotion: NWA Mid-America and Southeast Championship Wrestling
- Date established: October 24, 1967
- Date retired: May 1977
Statistics
- First champions: Lester Welch and Buddy Fuller
- Most reigns: Ron and Don Wright (10 reigns)

The NWA Tennessee Tag Team Championship was a secondary tag team title promoted as the name indicates mainly in the Tennessee region from 1967 until 1977, first by Gulf Coast Championship Wrestling and occasionally NWA Mid-America from 1967 to 1974 then by its successor Southeast Championship Wrestling from 1974 to 1977 when it was abandoned. Because the championship was a professional wrestling championship, it was not won or lost competitively but instead by the decision of the bookers of a wrestling promotion. The championship was awarded after the chosen wrestler "won" a match to maintain the illusion that professional wrestling is a competitive sport.

== Title history ==
Key
No.	Overall reign number
Reign	Reign number for the specific champion
Days	Number of days held

No.	Champion	Championship change			Reign statistics		Notes	Ref.
No.	Champion	Date	Event	Location	Reign	Days	Notes	Ref.
1	Lester Welch and Buddy Fuller	October 24, 1967	Mid-Am Show	Nashville, Tennessee	1	14	Won a tournament to become the first Tennessee Tag Team Champions.	
2	Mario Galento and Alex Perez	November 7, 1967	Mid-Am Show	Nashville, Tennessee	1	148		
3	Frank Dalton and Jack Dalton	April 3, 1968	Mid-Am Show	Nashville, Tennessee	1	(Note: The date the championship was won and lost has not been documented which means the championship reign lasted anywhere between 1 day and 273 days.)		
4	Les Thatcher and Dennis Hall	1969	Mid-Am Show	(Note: The location of the match was not captured as part of the championship documentation.)	1	(Note: The date the championship was won and lost has not been documented which means the championship reign lasted anywhere between 1 day and 180 days.)		
5	Ron and Don Wright	June 1969 (NLT)	Mid-Am Show		1	(Note: The date the championship was won has not been documented which means the championship reign lasted anywhere between 1 day and 19 days.)		
6	Les Thatcher (2) and Whitey Caldwell	June 20, 1969	Mid-Am Show	Knoxville, Tennessee	1	49		
6.5	vacated	August 8, 1969	N/A	N/A	N/A	N/A	Titles held up following a match against Ron and Don Wright	
7	Ron and Don Wright	August 15, 1969	Mid-Am Show	Knoxville, Tennessee	2	70	Wins Rematch	
8	Don Greene and Johnny Walker	October 24, 1969	Mid-Am Show	Knoxville, Tennessee	1	8		
—	Vacated	November 8, 1969	—	—	—	—	Vacant when Walker is under contract to tour Japan	
9	Les Thatcher (3) and Whitey Caldwell	November 29, 1969	Mid-Am Show	Knoxville, Tennessee	2	20	Defeats The Spoilers in a tournament final	
10	Frank Morrell and Tony Russo	December 19, 1969	Mid-Am Show	Knoxville, Tennessee	1	28		
11	Whitey Caldwell (3) and Johnny Walker (2)	January 16, 1970	Mid-Am Show	Knoxville, Tennessee	1	6		
12	The Spoilers (Spoiler #1 and #Spoiler 2)	January 22, 1970	Mid-Am Show	Chattanooga, Tennessee	1	15	Defeat Ron and Don Wright for the titles	
13	Ron and Don Wright	February 6, 1970	Mid-Am Show		3	63	Ron and Don Wright became co-champions with The Avengers after their match on March 13, 1970 with two referees ending in a split decision	
14	The Avengers (Avenger #1 and Avenger #2)	April 10, 1970	Mid-Am Show		1	(Note: The date the championship was won has not been documented which means the championship reign lasted anywhere between 1 day and 37 days.)	Defeat Ron and Don Wright to become the undisputed champions	
15	Ron Wright (4) and Frank Morrell (2)	May 17, 1970 NLT	Mid-Am Show		1	(Note: The date the championship was won has not been documented which means the championship reign lasted anywhere between 1 day and 19 days.)		
16	Whitey Caldwell (4) and Frankie Cain	June 5, 1970	Mid-Am Show	Knoxville, Tennessee	1	28		
17	Ron Wright (5) and Frank Morrell (3)	July 3, 1970	Mid-Am Show	Knoxville, Tennessee	2	(Note: The date the championship was won and lost has not been documented which means the championship reign lasted anywhere between 1 day and 133 days.)		
18	Les Thatcher (4) and Whitey Caldwell (5)	November 13, 1970	Mid-Am Show	Knoxville, Tennessee	3	(Note: The date the championship was won and lost has not been documented which means the championship reign lasted anywhere between 1 day and 40 days.)		
19	The Heavenly Bodies (Don (2) and Al Greene)	December 23, 1970	Mid-Am Show	Knoxville, Tennessee	1	(Note: The date the championship was won and lost has not been documented which means the championship reign lasted anywhere between 1 day and 16 days.)	Billed as having "defeated the Scott brothers Wednesday at Jackson" (Knoxville News-Sentinel, 70/12/27); the actual Jackson card has the Greenes facing Tojo Yamamoto and Jerry Jarrett for Southern Title.	
20	Ron Wright (6) and Don Wright	January 8, 1971	Mid-Am Show	Knoxville, Tennessee	4	(Note: The date the championship was won and lost has not been documented which means the championship reign lasted anywhere between 1 day and 114 days.)		
21	The Untouchables (Karl Von Stroheim and Frank Martinez)	May 2, 1971 NLT	Mid-Am Show	Knoxville, Tennessee	1	(Note: The date the championship was won and lost has not been documented which means the championship reign lasted anywhere between 1 day and 33 days.)		
21	Len Rossi and Bearcat Brown	June 4, 1971	Mid-Am Show	Knoxville, Tennessee	1	56		
22	Ron Wright (7) and Don Wright	July 30, 1971	Mid-Am Show	Knoxville, Tennessee	5	35	Ron defeated Rossi on July 16 for one half of the titles and Don defeated Brown on July 30 for the other half of the titles	
23	The Alaskans	September 3, 1971	Mid-Am Show	Knoxville, Tennessee	1	14		
24	Ron Wright (8) and Whitey Caldwell (6)	September 17, 1971	Mid-Am Show	Knoxville, Tennessee	1	35		
25	Whitey Caldwell (7) and Bearcat Brown (2)	October 8, 1971	Mid-Am Show	Knoxville, Tennessee	1	7	Defeat Ron and Don Wright after Wright and Caldwell split up	
—	Vacated	October 15, 1971	—	—	—	—	Vacant following a match against The Von Brauners	
26	The Von Brauners (Kurt and Karl Von Brauner)	October 22, 1971	Mid-Am Show	Knoxville, Tennessee	1	21	Wins rematch	
27	The Avengers (Avenger #1 and Avenger #2)	November 12, 1971	Mid-Am Show	Knoxville, Tennessee	2	70		
28	The Heavenly Bodies (Don (3) and Al Greene)	January 21, 1972	Mid-Am Show	Knoxville, Tennessee	2	35		
29	Ron Wright (9) and Jack Donovan	February 25, 1972	Mid-Am Show	Knoxville, Tennessee	1	63		
30	Robert Fuller and Roy Lee Welch	April 28, 1972	Mid-Am Show	Knoxville, Tennessee	1	(Note: The date the championship was lost has not been documented which means the championship reign lasted anywhere between 1 day and 8 days.)		
31	The Heavenly Bodies (Don (4) and Al Greene)	May 1972	Mid-Am Show	Knoxville, Tennessee	3	(Note: The date the championship was lost has not been documented which means the championship reign lasted anywhere between 1 day and 9 days.)		
32	The Australians (Larry O'Day and Ron Miller)	May 19, 1972	Mid-Am Show	Knoxville, Tennessee	1	14		
32	Ron Wright (10) and Jack Donovan	June 2, 1972	Mid-Am Show	Knoxville, Tennessee	2	14		
—	Vacated	June 16, 1972	—	—	—	—	Vacant after Donovan turned on Wright in a tag match between Ron and Don Wright and Jack Donovan vs. Whitey Caldwell, Larry O'Day, and Ron Miller	
33	Ron Wright (11) and Don Wright	June 30, 1972	Mid-Am Show	Knoxville, Tennessee	6	1	Defeated Jack Donovan and Whitey Caldwell	
34	Sputnik Monroe and Tommy Gilbert	July 1, 1972	Mid-Am Show	Chattanooga, Tennessee	1	14		
35	Ron Wright (12) and Don Wright	July 15, 1972	Mid-Am Show	Chattanooga, Tennessee	7	7		
36	Sputnik Monroe and Tommy Gilbert	July 22, 1972	Mid-Am Show	Chattanooga, Tennessee	2	7		
37	Ron Wright (13) and Don Wright	July 29, 1972	Mid-Am Show	Chattanooga, Tennessee	8	(Note: The date the championship was lost has not been documented which means the championship reign lasted anywhere between 1 day and 67 days.)		
Championship history is unrecorded from July 29, 1972 to October 4, 1972.
38	Don Wright (9) and Sam Bass	October 4, 1972 NLT	Mid-Am Show		1	(Note: The date the championship was lost has not been documented which means the championship reign lasted anywhere between 1 day and 37 days.)		
39	Jerry Lawler and Jim White	November 10, 1972 NLT	Mid-Am Show		1	(Note: The date the championship was won has not been documented which means the championship reign lasted anywhere between 313 days and 131 days.)		
40	Tommy Gilbert (3) and Bearcat Brown (3)	December 8, 1972	Mid-Am Show	Knoxville, Tennessee	1	28		
41	Ron Wright (14) and Don Wright (10)	January 5, 1973	Mid-Am Show	Knoxville, Tennessee	9	7		
42	Tommy Gilbert (4) and Ed Wolfe	January 12, 1973	Mid-Am Show	Knoxville, Tennessee	1	(Note: The date the championship was won and lost has not been documented which means the championship reign lasted anywhere between 1 day and 71 days.)		
43	Ron Wright (15) and Don Wright (11)	March 24, 1973 NLT	Mid-Am Show	Knoxville, Tennessee	10	(Note: The date the championship was won and lost has not been documented which means the championship reign lasted anywhere between 1 day and 68 days.)		
44	The Continental Warriors (Bobby Hart and Lorenzo Parente)	May 1973 NLT	Mid-Am Show		1	(Note: The date the championship was won and lost has not been documented which means the championship reign lasted anywhere between 1 day and 91 days.)		
45	Ron Wright (16) and Don Wright (12)	July 1973 NLT	Mid-Am Show		11	(Note: The date the championship was won and lost has not been documented which means the championship reign lasted anywhere between 1 day and 123 days.)		
46	The Mighty Yankees (Frank Morrell (4) and Eddie Sullivan)	November 2, 1973 NLT	Mid-Am Show		1	(Note: The date the championship was won and lost has not been documented which means the championship reign lasted anywhere between 1 day and 3 days.)		
47	Mike Paidousis and Rocky Smith	November 5, 1973	Mid-Am Show	Knoxville, Tennessee	1	(Note: The date the championship was won and lost has not been documented which means the championship reign lasted anywhere between 1 day and 118 days.)		
48	Frank Monte and Nick deCarlo	March 3, 1974 NLT	Mid-Am Show		1	(Note: The date the championship was won and lost has not been documented which means the championship reign lasted anywhere between 1 day and 5 days.)		
49	The Mighty Yankees (Frank Morrell (5) and Eddie Sullivan)	March 8, 1974	Mid-Am Show	Knoxville, Tennessee	2	14		
50	Don Greene (5) and Dennis Hall (4)	March 22, 1974	Mid-Am Show	Knoxville, Tennessee	1	(Note: The date the championship was lost has not been documented which means the championship reign lasted anywhere between 1 day and 21 days.)	Defeated the Bounty Hunters (David Novak and Jerry Novak) to win the championship	
51	The Mighty Yankees (Frank Morrell (6) and Eddie Sullivan)	April 12, 1974	Mid-Am Show		3	(Note: The date the championship was lost has not been documented which means the championship reign lasted anywhere between 1 day and 14 days.)	Mighty Yankees and Don Greene and Steve Kovacs became co-champions on April 19 after a double pin	
52	Don Greene (6) and Steve Kovacs	April 26, 1974	Mid-Am Show	Knoxville, Tennessee	1	7		
53	The Bounty Hunters (David Novak and Jacob Novak)	May 3, 1974	Mid-Am Show	Knoxville, Tennessee	1	49		
54	Steve Kovacs (2) and Jimmy Kent	June 21, 1974	Mid-Am Show	Knoxville, Tennessee	1	35		
55	Ron Wright (17) and Don Wright (13)	July 26, 1974	Mid-Am Show	Knoxville, Tennessee	12	(Note: The date the championship was lost has not been documented which means the championship reign lasted anywhere between 1 day and 16 days.)		
56	The Bounty Hunters (David Novak and Jacob Novak)	August 11, 1974 NLT	Mid-Am Show		2	40		
57	Ron Wright (18) and Don Wright (14)	September 20, 1974	Mid-Am Show		13	35		
58	Ron and Terry Garvin	October 25, 1974	Mid-Am Show	Knoxville, Tennessee	1	21		
59	Ron Wright (19) and Tommy Gilbert (4)	November 15, 1974	Mid-Am Show	Knoxville, Tennessee	1	21		
60	Dutch Mantell and John Foley	December 6, 1974	Mid-Am Show	Knoxville, Tennessee	1	35		
61	Les Thatcher (5) and Nelson Royal	January 10, 1975	Mid-Am Show	Knoxville, Tennessee	1	35		
62	Dutch Mantell and John Foley	February 14, 1975	Mid-Am Show	Knoxville, Tennessee	2	37		
63	Les Thatcher (6) and Nelson Royal	March 23, 1975	Mid-Am Show	Knoxville, Tennessee	2	(Note: The date the championship was lost has not been documented which means the championship reign lasted anywhere between 9 days and 38 days.)		
64	Ron and Don Bass	April 1975	Mid-Am Show		1	(Note: The date the championship was won and lost has not been documented which means the championship reign lasted anywhere between 1 day and 29 days.)		
65	Ron Wright (20) and Nelson Royal	April 1975	Mid-Am Show		1	(Note: The date the championship was won and lost has not been documented which means the championship reign lasted anywhere between 1 day and 35 days.)		
66	Ron and Don Bass	May 1975	Mid-Am Show		2	(Note: The date the championship was won and lost has not been documented which means the championship reign lasted anywhere between 1 day and 5 days.)		
67	Jerry Jarrett and George Gulas	May 7, 1975	Mid-Am Show	Nashville, Tennessee	1	(Note: The date the championship was lost has not been documented which means the championship reign lasted anywhere between 1 day and 54 days.)	Defeated Ron and Don Wright to win the champiohnship	
68	Jimmy Golden (2) and Ricky Gibson	May 31, 1975 NLT	Mid-Am Show	Knoxville, Tennessee	1	(Note: The date the championship was won and lost has not been documented which means the championship reign lasted anywhere between 1 day and 27 days.)		
69	Ron Fuller and The Assassin	June 27, 1975	Mid-Am Show	Knoxville, Tennessee	1	49		
70	The Assassin (2) and Rock Hunter	August 15, 1975	Mid-Am Show	Knoxville, Tennessee	1	21	Assassin defeated Fuller for control of the titles and selected Rock Hunter as his new partner	
71	Ron (21) and Don Wright (15)	September 1975 NLT	Mid-Am Show		14	(Note: The date the championship was won and lost has not been documented which means the championship reign lasted anywhere between 62 days and 183 days.)		
72	The Assassin (3) and Rock Hunter	October 3, 1975	Mid-Am Show	Knoxville, Tennessee	2	(Note: The date the championship was lost has not been documented which means the championship reign lasted anywhere between 1 day and 85 days.)		
40	Norvell Austin and Butch Malone	December 27, 1975 NLT	Mid-Am Show		1	(Note: The date the championship was lost has not been documented which means the championship reign lasted anywhere between 1 day and 606 days.)		
Championship history is unrecorded from December 27, 1975 to April 1977.
41	Danny Little Bear and Chief Thundercloud	April 1977 NLT	Mid-Am Show		1	(Note: The date the championship was won has not been documented which means the championship reign lasted anywhere between 2 days and 517 days.)		
42	Luke Graham and Ripper Collins	May 2, 1977	Mid-Am Show	Memphis, Tennessee	1	(Note: The date the championship was lost has not been documented which means the championship reign lasted anywhere between 1 day and 29 days.)		
43	Don Greene (2) and Joey Rossi	May 1977 NLT	Mid-Am Show		1	(Note: The date the championship was abandoned has not been documented which means the championship reign lasted anywhere between 1 day and 242 days.)		
—	Deactivated	1977	—	—	—	—	The Championship was abandoned.	

== See also ==
- Gulf Coast Championship Wrestling / Southeast Championship Wrestling
- NWA Mid-America
- National Wrestling Alliance
