= NWA Southeastern Heavyweight Championship (Northern Division) =

Professional wrestling championship

NWA Southeastern Heavyweight Championship (Northern)

Details
- Promotion: Southeastern Championship Wrestling
- Date established: February, 1972
- Date retired: 1988
Statistics
- First champion(s): Ron Wright
- Most reigns: Mongolian Stomper (11 reigns)
- Oldest champion: "Bullet" Bob Armstrong (46 years, 61 days)
- Youngest champion: Terry "Bam Bam" Gordy (21 years)
- Heaviest champion: Bad News Harris (400 lb (180 kg; 29 st))
- Lightest champion: Danny Davis (213 lb (97 kg; 15.2 st))

The NWA Southeastern Heavyweight Championship (Northern Division) was a major title in the NWA's Alabama territory known as Southeastern Championship Wrestling. It existed from 1972 until 1988 when the promotion became the Continental Wrestling Federation. This title had two divisions of it, the "Northern Division" and the "Southern Division", with the Northern Division being the predominant one. The Southern Division was the continuation of the NWA Gulf Coast Heavyweight Championship. Please see that title history for the Southern Division title history.

== Title history ==
Key
No.	Overall reign number
Reign	Reign number for the specific champion
Days	Number of days held

No.	Champion	Championship change			Reign statistics		Notes	Ref.
No.	Champion	Date	Event	Location	Reign	Days	Notes	Ref.
1	Don Greene	August 30, 1970 NLT	SCW Show	N/A	1	N/A	Records are unclear as to whom he defeated	
2	Ron Wright	September 11, 1970	SCW Show	Knoxville, TN	1	70		
3	Whitey Caldwell	November 20, 1970	SCW Show	Knoxville, TN	1	N/A		
4	Ron Wright	April 1971	SCW Show	N/A	2	N/A		
5	Jack Donovan	July 14, 1972	SCW Show	Knoxville, TN	1	14		
6	Ron Wright	July 28, 1972	SCW Show	Knoxville, TN	3	63		
7	Whitey Caldwell	September 29, 1972	SCW Show	Knoxville, TN	2	9		
—	Vacated	October 8, 1972	—	—	—	—	Title vacant when Caldwell is killed in a car accident on October 8, 1972	
8	Jerry Brisco	May 17, 1974	SCW Show	Atlanta, GA	1	N/A	Defeated Bobby Duncum	
9	Ron Fuller	1974	SCW Show	N/A	1	N/A		
10	Ron Wright	1974	SCW Show	N/A	4	N/A		
11	Ron Fuller	February 28, 1975	SCW Show	Knoxville, TN	2	N/A		
12	Pepper Gomez	September 1975	SCW Show	N/A	1	N/A		
13	Ron Wright	January 25, 1976	SCW Show	Knoxville, TN	5	19		
14	Don Carson	February 13, 1976	SCW Show	Knoxville, TN	1	70		
15	Ron Fuller	April 23, 1976	SCW Show	Knoxville, TN	3	N/A		
16	Robert Fuller	June 1976	SCW Show	N/A	1	N/A		
17	Toru Tanaka	July 1976	SCW Show	N/A	1	N/A		
18	The Gladiator	August 13, 1976	SCW Show	Knoxville, TN	1	N/A		
19	Mongolian Stomper	1976	SCW Show	N/A	1	N/A		
20	Robert Fuller	January 1977	SCW Show	N/A	2	N/A		
21	Mongolian Stomper	March 1977	SCW Show	N/A	2	N/A		
22	Robert Fuller	April 28, 1977	SCW Show	Knoxville, TN	3	73		
23	Ron Garvin	July 10, 1977	SCW Show	Knoxville, TN	1	N/A		
24	Mongolian Stomper	September 1977	SCW Show	N/A	3	N/A		
25	Ron Fuller	September 2, 1977	SCW Show	Knoxville, TN	4	N/A		
26	Mongolian Stomper	October 1977	SCW Show	N/A	4	N/A		
27	Robert Fuller	April 1978	SCW Show	N/A	4	N/A		
28	Mongolian Stomper	May 1978	SCW Show	N/A	5	N/A		
29	Ron Garvin	June 1978	SCW Show	N/A	2	N/A		
—	Vacated	June 1978	—	—	—	—	Championship vacated for undocumented reasons	
30	Mongolian Stomper	June 23, 1978	SCW Show	Knoxville, TN	6	49	Won tournament	
31	Robert Fuller	August 11, 1978	SCW Show	Knoxville, TN	5	7		
32	Mongolian Stomper	August 18, 1978	SCW Show	Knoxville, TN	7	N/A		
33	Robert Fuller	1978	SCW Show	N/A	6	N/A		
34	Boris Malenko	November 1978	SCW Show	N/A	1	N/A		
35	Ron Garvin	December 8, 1978	SCW Show	Knoxville, TN	3	N/A		
36	Mongolian Stomper	December 1978	SCW Show	N/A	8	N/A		
37	Ron Garvin	January 1979	SCW Show	N/A	4	N/A		
38	Alexis Smirnoff	May 18, 1979	SCW Show	Knoxville, TN	1	14		
39	Ron Garvin	June 1, 1979	SCW Show	Knoxville, TN	5	N/A		
40	Dick Slater	July 1979	SCW Show	N/A	1	N/A		
41	Mongolian Stomper	August 3, 1979	SCW Show	Knoxville, TN	9	21		
42	Dick Slater	August 24, 1979	SCW Show	Knoxville, TN	2	N/A		
43	Toru Tanaka	November 1979	SCW Show	N/A	2	N/A		
44	Dick Slater	November 1979	SCW Show	N/A	3	N/A		
45	Bob Roop	December 1979	SCW Show	N/A	1	N/A		
46	Sterling Golden	December 1, 1979	SCW Show	Knoxville, TN	1	24		
47	Bob Armstrong	December 25, 1979	SCW Show	Knoxville, TN	1	N/A		
48	Killer Karl Kox	March 1980	SCW Show	N/A	1	N/A		
49	Jos LeDuc	March 1980	SCW Show	N/A	1	N/A		
50	Killer Karl Kox	March 1980	SCW Show	N/A	2	N/A		
51	Ole Anderson	March 30, 1980	SCW Show	N/A	1	N/A		
52	Killer Karl Kox	May 1980	SCW Show	N/A	3	N/A		
53	Bad News Harris	May 1980	SCW Show	N/A	1	N/A		
54	Terry Taylor	1980	SCW Show	Knoxville, TN	1	N/A		
55	Dennis Condrey	1980	SCW Show	Knoxville, TN	1	N/A		
56	Mongolian Stomper	October 1980	SCW Show	N/A	10	N/A		
57	Ron Fuller	1981	SCW Show	N/A	5	N/A		
—	Vacated	1981	—	—	—	—	Championship vacated for undocumented reasons	
58	Ken Lucas	March 16, 1981	SCW Show	Birmingham, Al	1	14	Defeated Ron Bass	
59	Ron Bass	March 30, 1981	SCW Show	Birmingham, Al	1	28		
60	Ken Lucas	April 27, 1981	SCW Show	Birmingham, Al	2	28		
61	Mr. Saito	May 25, 1981	SCW Show	Birmingham, Al	1	14		
62	Ron Fuller	June 8, 1981	SCW Show	Birmingham, Al	6	7		
63	Mr. Saito	June 15, 1981	SCW Show	Birmingham, Al	2	N/A		
—	Vacated	July 1981	—	—	—	—	Mr. Saito leaves territory.	
64	Mr. Olympia	1981	SCW Show	N/A	1	N/A	Unknown how Olympia gained the title.	
65	Mongolian Stomper	November 3, 1981	SCW Show	Mobile, AL	11	N/A		
66	Jos LeDuc	1981	SCW Show	N/A	2	N/A		
67	Jacques Rougeau Jr.	1982	SCW Show	N/A	1	N/A		
68	Jos LeDuc	1982	SCW Show	N/A	3	N/A		
69	Terry Gordy	1982	SCW Show	N/A	1	N/A		
70	Jos LeDuc	1982	SCW Show	N/A	4	N/A		
71	Bob Armstrong	August 30, 1982	SCW Show	Birmingham, Al	2	56		
72	David Schultz	October 25, 1982	SCW Show	Birmingham, Al	1	N/A		
73	Bob Armstrong	1982	SCW Show	N/A	3	N/A		
74	Austin Idol	December 1982	SCW Show	N/A	1	N/A		
75	Bob Armstrong	1983	SCW Show	N/A	4	N/A		
76	Jimmy Golden	March 1983	SCW Show	N/A	2	N/A		
77	Bob Armstrong	March 1983	SCW Show	N/A	5	N/A		
78	Ken Lucas	March 1983	SCW Show	N/A	3	N/A		
79	Bob Armstrong	April 11, 1983	SCW Show	N/A	6	N/A		
80	Jimmy Golden	1983	SCW Show	N/A	3	N/A		
81	The Flame	July 1983	SCW Show	N/A	1	N/A		
82	Jimmy Golden	July 1983	SCW Show	N/A	4	N/A		
83	Bob Armstrong	1983	SCW Show	N/A	7	N/A		
84	Jos LeDuc	November 1983	SCW Show	N/A	5	N/A		
—	Vacated	1983	—	—	—	—	Title vacated after match between LeDuc and Robert Fuller	
85	Bob Armstrong	December 3, 1983	SCW Show	Dothan, AL	8	N/A	Won tournament	
86	Jerry Stubbs	December 1983	SCW Show	N/A	2	N/A		
—	Vacated	January 1984	—	—	—	—	Title stripped for attacking referees	
87	Wayne Farris	February 7, 1984	SCW Show	Mobile, AL	1	N/A	Won Tournament	
—	Vacated	March 1984	—	—	—	—	Farris left area	
88	Jimmy Golden	March 12, 1984	SCW Show	Birmingham, Al	5	105	Defeated Mr. Orient in tournament final	
89	Vic Rain	June 25, 1984	SCW Show	Birmingham, Al	1	N/A		
90	Austin Idol	August 1984	SCW Show	N/A	2	N/A		
91	Jimmy Golden	November 22, 1984	SCW Show	Birmingham, Al	6	N/A		
92	Mr. Olympia	1984	SCW Show	N/A	3	N/A		
93	Jimmy Golden	1984	SCW Show	N/A	7	N/A		
94	Pork Chop Cash	January 1985	SCW Show	N/A	1	N/A		
95	Boomer Lynch	March 1985	SCW Show	N/A	1	N/A		
96	Jimmy Golden	March 30, 1985	SCW Show	Dothan, AL	8	119		
97	Austin Idol	July 27, 1985	SCW Show	Birmingham, Al	3	10		
98	Adrian Street	August 6, 1985	SCW Show	Birmingham, Al	1	153		
99	Norvell Austin	January 6, 1986	SCW Show	Birmingham, AL	1	42		
100	Adrian Street	February 17, 1986	SCW Show	Birmingham, Al	2	42		
101	Wendell Cooley	March 31, 1986	SCW Show	Birmingham, Al	1	84		
102	Adrian Street	June 23, 1986	SCW Show	Birmingham, Al	3	N/A		
103	Wendell Cooley	July 1986	SCW Show	N/A	2	N/A		
104	Adrian Street	January 5, 1987	SCW Show	Birmingham, Al	4	98		
105	Dutch Mantel	April 13, 1987	SCW Show	Birmingham, Al	1	224		
106	Danny Davis	November 23, 1987	SCW Show	Montgomery, AL	1	32		
107	Lord Humongous	December 25, 1987	SCW Show	Knoxville, TN	1	N/A		
—	Deactivated	1988	—	—	—	—	CCW became the CWF on April 30, 1988 and the title was retired.	

== See also ==
- List of National Wrestling Alliance championships
- Southeast Championship Wrestling
- Gulf Coast Championship Wrestling
