= Robert Fuller (wrestler) =

American professional wrestler (born 1949)

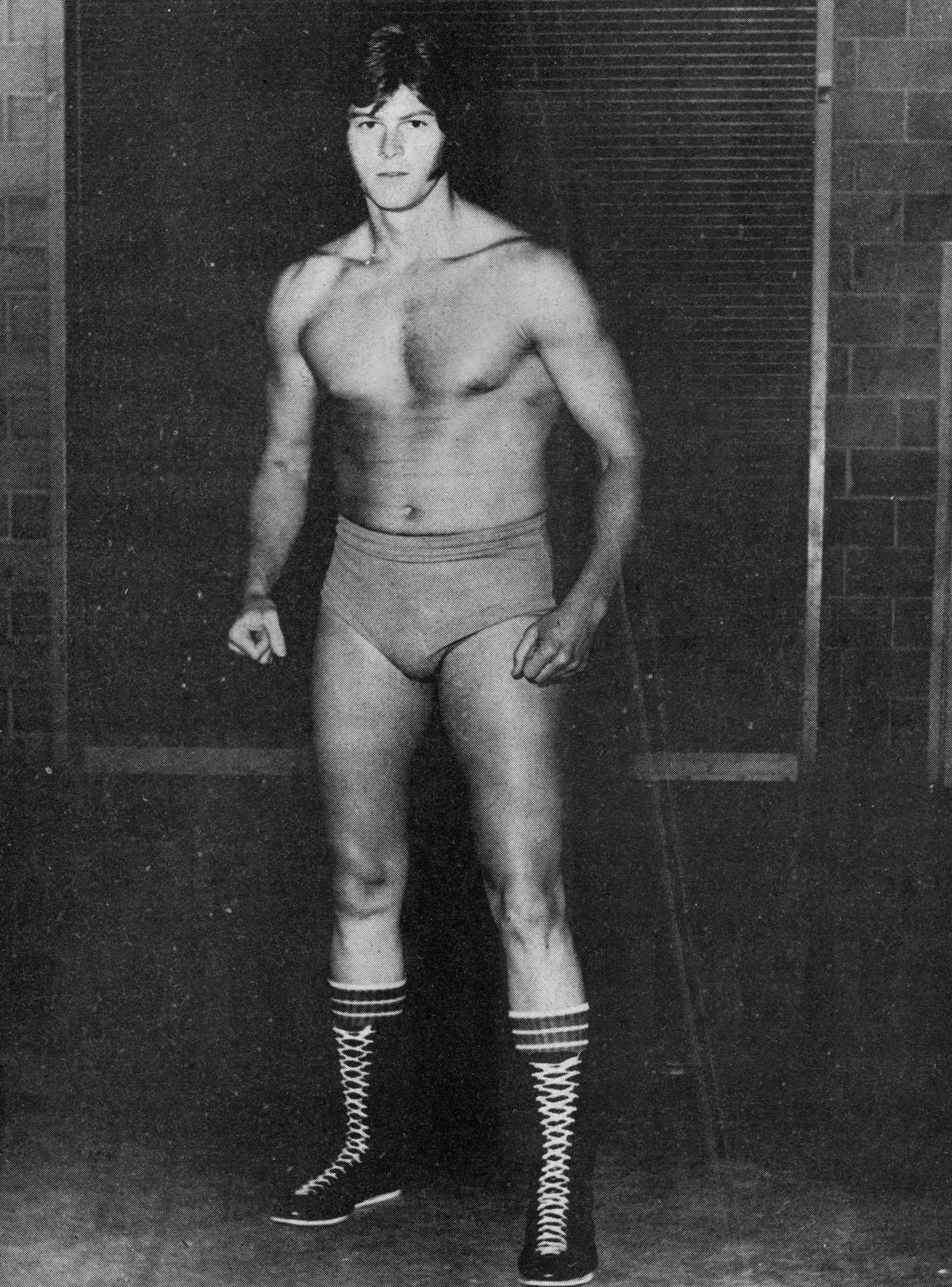

Personal information
- Born: Robert Welch; May 14, 1949 (age 77) Memphis, Tennessee, U.S.
- Children: 3

Professional wrestling career
- Ring name(s): Robert Fuller; Tennessee Stud II; Tennessee Lee; Col. Robert Parker
- Billed height: 6 ft 5 in (1.96 m)
- Billed weight: 240 lb (110 kg; 17 st)
- Billed from: Memphis, Tennessee
- Trained by: Buddy Fuller
- Debut: 1970
- Retired: 2018

Robert Welch (born May 14, 1949) is an American manager and retired professional wrestler, better known by his ring names Robert Fuller and Col. Robert Parker. Robert and his brother Ron co-owned Continental Championship Wrestling for a time.

== Professional wrestling career ==
Fuller started wrestling in 1970 in the Alabama and Tennessee regions with fellow wrestlers like Night Hawk. He often teamed with his cousin Jimmy Golden and they won many tag team titles. In the 1980s, he took his brother Ron's idea and made a stable called The Stud Stable. Among the members in the independent versions of this stable were Golden, Sid Vicious, Cactus Jack, Dutch Mantel, Brickhouse Brown, Gary Young, and Brian Lee. He spent some time in the American Wrestling Association with Golden in 1988, and they feuded with The Rock 'n' Roll Express (Ricky Morton and Robert Gibson). He also wrestled in the Texas area where he teamed with Jeff Jarrett to win the USWA World Tag Team Championship.

In 1993, Fuller went to World Championship Wrestling as manager Col. Robert Parker, a takeoff of Col. Tom Parker of Elvis Presley fame. He managed Sid Vicious and teamed with manager Harley Race and his protege, Vader to form "The Masters of the Powerbomb". They feuded with Sting and Davey Boy Smith. In 1994, he managed "Stunning Steve" Austin before reforming his "Stud Stable" with Golden as "Bunkhouse Buck", Meng, Dick Slater, Terry Funk, Arn Anderson and Blacktop Bully. They feuded heavily with Dusty and Dustin Rhodes. In 1995, Col. Parker courted Sherri Martel to the dismay of both the Stud Stable and Sherri's charges, Harlem Heat. Parker and Sherri went to get married and Sherri was attacked by Madusa, who was supposed to be Parker's wife. Parker and Sherri split and feuded and then made up again, with Parker leaving the Stud Stable to help Sherri manage Harlem Heat. While with Harlem Heat, Parker's official title was "promoter", while Sherri retained the "manager" designation. One trademark of Parker's managing would be his fanning himself during matches. In October 1996, Harlem Heat fired Parker after he cost them the WCW World Tag Team Championships. He quickly started to manage The Amazing French Canadians (Jacques Rougeau and Carl Ouellet), trading in his gray suit for a French Foreign Legion uniform. Harlem Heat and The Amazing French Canadians began feuding.

Fuller was released from WCW in 1997 and in March 1998, he resurfaced in the WWF as Tennessee Lee, a character similar to his Col. Parker character, and began managing former partner Jeff Jarrett. His time in the WWF was short-lived; he would be released in August 1998 and went back to wrestling with Golden on the independent circuit in Alabama. On June 2, 2006 in Irondale, Alabama, Fuller managed Shannon Spruill against El Mexico for the NWA Wrestle Birmingham Junior Heavyweight Championship. With the help of Fuller (who referred to Spruill as his "Million Dollar Baby"), Spruill defeated El Mexico to win her third wrestling title. On September 14, 2006, Fuller was seen, once again as Col. Parker, being interviewed by Robert Roode on TNA Impact!. On February 8, 2018, Fuller made a return to professional wrestling as Col. Robert Parker, a manager for Major League Wrestling. He reactivated The Stud Stable with the Dirty Blondes as his first signees.

== Personal life ==
Robert Fuller comes from a wrestling family: his father Buddy Fuller and his grandfather Roy Welch were wrestlers, as were his brother Ron Fuller and his cousin Jimmy Golden ("Bunkhouse Buck").

He has been married four times: Joyce Logan, who he has his oldest daughter Kimberly by; Sylvia Wilson (Miss Sylvia), who he has Katie and Charlotte by; Susan Lostraglio, who he had no children with; and his current wife Laverne Stewart. He has 7 grandchildren. Fuller currently resides in Seminole, Florida.

His ex-wife and valet Miss Sylvia (born December 15, 1956) died surrounded by 2 of her daughters and current husband, after a years long fight with breast cancer, on November 11, 2022, at the age of 65. She is buried at Parkhill Cemetery in Columbus, Georgia.

== Championships and accomplishments ==
- Championship Wrestling Alliance

- CWA Heavyweight Championship (1 time)
- CWA Television Championship (1 time)

- George Tragos/Lou Thesz Professional Wrestling Hall of Fame
  - Lou Thesz Award 2026 – with the Welch/Fuller Family
- Georgia Championship Wrestling

- NWA Georgia Tag Team Championship (4 times) – with Bob Armstrong
- NWA Macon Tag Team Championship (2 times) – with Jimmy Golden (1) and Don Muraco (1)

- National Wrestling Alliance^{*}

- NWA Southeastern Heavyweight Championship (Northern Division) (4 times)

- NWA Florida

- PWF Tag Team Championship (1 time) – with Kendall Windham
- NWA Wrestle Birmingham Alabama Tag Team Championship (1 time) – with Jimmy Golden
- NWA National Tag Team titles (1 time) – with Jimmy Golden

- NWA Mid-America / Continental Wrestling Association

- AWA Southern Heavyweight Championship (2 times)
- AWA Southern Tag Team Championship (2 times) – with Toru Tanaka (1) and Bill Dundee) (1)
- CWA Tag Team Championship (3 times) – with Jimmy Golden (2) and Brian Lee (1)
- NWA Southern Heavyweight Championship (Memphis version) (1 time)
- NWA World Tag Team Championship (Mid-America Version) (1 time) – with Kevin Sullivan
- NWA United States Tag Team Championship (Mid-America version) (1 time) – with Ron Fuller

- North American Wrestling Association / South Atlantic Pro Wrestling

- NAWA/SAPW Heavyweight Championship (2 times)

- Pro Wrestling Illustrated

- PWI ranked him #102 of the top 500 singles wrestlers in the PWI 500 in 1991
- PWI ranked him #332 of the top 500 singles wrestlers of the "PWI Years" in 2003
- PWI ranked him #80 of the top 100 tag teams of the "PWI Years" with Jimmy Golden in 2003

- Southeastern Championship Wrestling

- NWA Southeastern Continental Heavyweight Championship (2 times)
- NWA Southeastern Continental Tag Team Championship (2 times) - with Jimmy Golden
- NWA Southeastern Heavyweight Championship (Northern Division) (2 times)
- NWA Southeastern Tag Team Championship (15 times) – with Ron Fuller (2), Eddie Boulder (1), Jos LeDuc (3), Bob Armstrong (2), and Jimmy Golden (7)
- NWA Southeastern Television Championship (2 times)

- United States Wrestling Association

- USWA World Tag Team Championship (6 times) – with Brian Lee (2), Jeff Jarrett (3), and Mike Mitchell (1)

- USA Wrestling
  - USA Heavyweight Championship (1 time)
- World Class Wrestling Association

- WCWA World Tag Team Championship (2 times) – with Jimmy Golden (1) and Brian Lee (1)

^{*}Records aren't clear as to which NWA affiliated promotion Fuller wrestled for when 4 of his 6 total reigns with it began. While the title was usually defended only in the Southeastern Championship Wrestling promotion, it was occasionally used in others such as Georgia Championship Wrestling.
