= Don Bass (wrestler) =

American professional wrestler (1946–2016)

Personal information
- Born: Donald Hollis Welch; March 14, 1946 West Memphis, Arkansas, U.S.
- Died: September 16, 2016 (aged 70) Memphis, Tennessee, U.S.

Professional wrestling career
- Ring name(s): Assassin #2; Don Bass; Fire; Intern #2; Rock and Roll Phantom #1; Scorpion
- Billed height: 6 ft 0 in (183 cm)
- Billed weight: 295 lb (134 kg)
- Billed from: Greasy Corner, Arkansas
- Debut: 1972

Donald Hollis Welch (March 14, 1946 – September 16, 2016) was an American professional wrestler, best known by the ring name Don Bass.

== Professional wrestling career ==
=== Early career (1973–1981) ===
Don Welch was trained by Al "Spider" Galento and started wrestling in 1968.

Bass found early success as a tag team wrestler, teaming up with his brother, Ron Bass as a member of the heel stable The Bass Family. The duo was managed by their "mother", Maw Bass. Maw Bass carried a loaded purse, with which she would strike their opponents to steal a victory.

=== Continental Wrestling Alliance (1981–1988) ===
In the early 1980s, Don Bass joined Continental Wrestling Association as one half of The Interns with Roger Smith. The masked duo would become a staple in Memphis tag team wrestling, capturing the AWA Southern Tag Team Championship on five occasions.

Later, the team would be repackaged as Fire and Flame, once again winning the Southern Tag Titles. During this time, Bass defeated Jerry Lawler in a tag team match, winning the AWA Southern Heavyweight Championship, his first and only major singles championship.

In 1987, after a brief absence he returned to CWA and in an angle, he tried unsuccessfully to become a country singer by lipsynching to songs that was originally sung by Bobby Bare.

=== United States Wrestling Association (1989–1996) ===
Don Bass would work under several masks and gimmicks including The Assassins, Scorpion, Rock and Roll Phantom and Fire. He would continue with USWA until his "retirement" in 1996

=== Late career (1996–2010) ===
Don Bass began a training school in Jericho, Arkansas. He trained with many of the Power Pro Wrestling superstars and headed the Power Pro School of Wrestling. He trained Derrick king, Alan Steele, "Big" Nasty Bill, Hoss Williams, Blade, Jett Logan, Alexi Krisis, Dustin 5 Starr and Simon Reed of the Posse And Tombstone plus many more. He continued working around the Memphis area until the time of his death.

== Death ==
Welch died of cancer in Memphis, on September 16, 2016, at the age of 70.

== Championships and accomplishments ==
- Gulf Coast Championship Wrestling - Southeastern Championship Wrestling
  - NWA Gulf Coast Tag Team Championship (1 times) – with Ron Bass (1 time)
  - NWA Tennessee Tag Team Championship (2 times) - with Ron Bass
  - NWA United States Tag Team Championship (Gulf Coast version) (1 time) – with Bobby Bass
- NWA Mid-South
  - NWA Mid-South Unified Heavyweight Championship (2 times)
- NWA Mid-America / Continental Wrestling Association
  - AWA Southern Heavyweight Championship (2 times)
  - AWA Southern Tag Team Championship (5 time) - with Don Greene (1 time) and Roger Smith (4 times)
  - CWA Tag Team Championship (1 time) - with Gary Young (1 time)
  - CWA World Tag Team Championship (5 times) - with Assassin #1
  - NWA United States Tag Team Championship (Mid-America version) (1 time) – with Ron Bass
