= Les Thatcher =

American professional wrestler

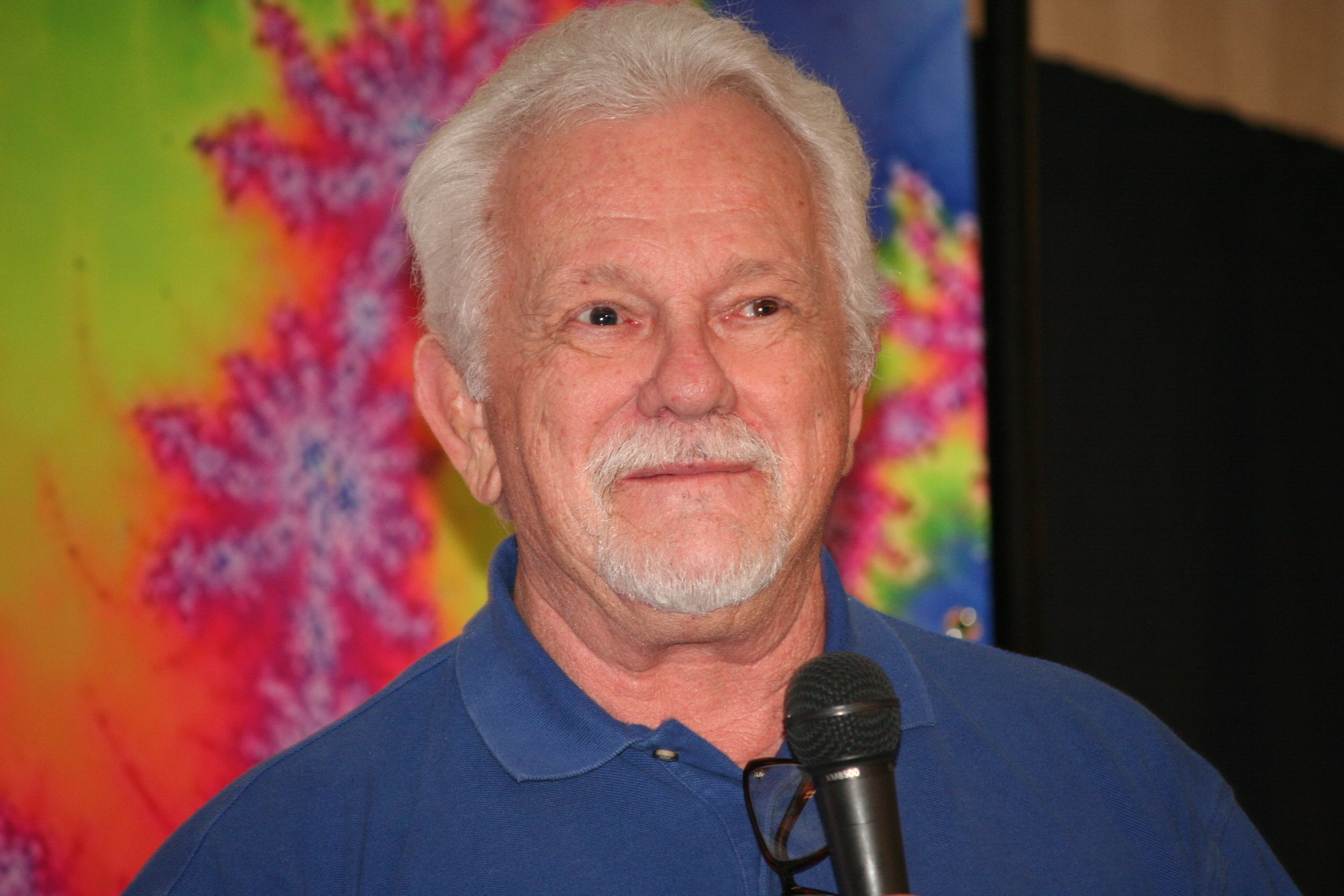
- Thatcher in 2014

Personal information
- Born: Leslie Malady; October 28, 1940 (age 85) Cincinnati, Ohio, U.S.

Professional wrestling career
- Ring name: Les Thatcher
- Billed height: 5 ft 10 in (1.78 m)
- Billed weight: 220 lb (100 kg)
- Billed from: Cincinnati, Ohio
- Trained by: Tony Santos
- Debut: July 4, 1960
- Retired: 1979

Leslie Malady (born October 28, 1940), better known by the name Les Thatcher, is an American former professional wrestler. He helps run Elite Pro Wrestling Training, a professional wrestling school in his hometown of Cincinnati, Ohio, along with Ricky Steamboat and, until his death in 2019, Harley Race. He is also on the board of directors of the Cauliflower Alley Club. He won several regional tag team championships with various partners, including Nelson Royal and Roger Kirby. He turned his hand to singles competition as a junior heavyweight.

== Early life ==
Thatcher was born in Cincinnati, Ohio. He first watched wrestling when he was eight years old while at a friend's house, stating, "The action on that little ten-inch black & white screen just reached out and grabbed me". In his youth, he played basketball, baseball, and football. He started wrestling at his local YMCA as a twelve-year-old. He attended Central High School in Cincinnati.

== Professional wrestling career ==
Thatcher heard about Tony Santos, a promoter and owner of a wrestling school in Boston, Massachusetts. Shortly thereafter, he began training in February 1960. On July 4, 1960, Thatcher made his professional wrestling debut against “Cowboy” Ronnie Hill in Blue Hill, Maine.

In 1966, Thatcher started to work as part of a "cousins" faction. He was a member of the team with Roger Kirby and Dennis Hall. They used this gimmick in various southern territories until 1969.

In the 1970s, Rudy Kay brought Thatcher to the Maritimes territory. This was the only time in his career that he worked as a heel (villainous character). It was in the Maritimes that Thatcher also began announcing matches. Afterward, he worked with Jim Crockett's Mid-Atlantic Championship Wrestling, announcing with Gordon Solie.

In the 1970s, Thatcher also announced for Southeastern Championship Wrestling. Throughout his broadcasting career, he also worked with Bob Caudle, Lance Russell and Jim Ross. During his announcing/hosting tenure, he worked for such companies as Georgia Championship Wrestling.

In 1994, Thatcher worked as an announcer for Smoky Mountain Wrestling in East Tennessee. He also ran the Heartland Wrestling Association beginning in 1996. He also created & produced the Brian Pillman Memorial Show. He also operates professional wrestling training seminars and weekend camps under the Elite Pro Wrestling Training banner.

== Other pursuits ==
From 1955 to 1966, he competed in NHRA drag racing, winning 100 trophies and two regional championships. In his late 40s and early 50s, he competed as a bodybuilder with NPC Masters Bodybuilding. He helped produce the first wrestling T-shirt in 1972 and helped publish the first color edition of WWWF Magazine in 1978.

In 1999, Thatcher appeared in an episode of the MTV Series True Life called "I'm A Pro Wrestler". The following year he also appeared in an episode of To Tell The Truth. He was elected onto the board of the Cauliflower Alley Club. Thatcher co-hosted a weekly wrestling radio program with Doc Young called Wrestling Weekly from 2005 to 2008. New editions of Wrestling Weekly are now being released as weekly podcasts found on the Wrestling Observer website. He also does routine website audio shows for PWInsider.

== Championships and accomplishments ==
- Cauliflower Alley Club
  - Art Abrams Lifetime Achievement Award (2005)
- George Tragos/Lou Thesz Professional Wrestling Hall of Fame
  - Jack Brisco Spotlight Award 2023
- NWA Mid-America
  - NWA World Tag Team Championship (Mid-America version) (1 time) – with Dennis Hall
  - NWA United States Tag Team Championship (Mid-America version) (4 times) – with Roger Kirby (1), Bearcat Brown (1), Dennis Hall (1), Nelson Royal (1)
  - NWA Southern Tag Team Championship (Mid-America version) (1 time) – with Bearcat Brown
  - NWA Tennessee Tag Team Championship (6 times) – with Dennis Hall, Whitey Caldwell (3) and Nelson Royal (2)
- Smoky Mountain Wrestling
  - Hall of Fame (class 1994)
- Other
  - Mid-Atlantic Hall of Heroes (2013)
  - NWA Rookie of the Year (1967)
