= Nelson Royal =

American professional wrestler, trainer and promoter

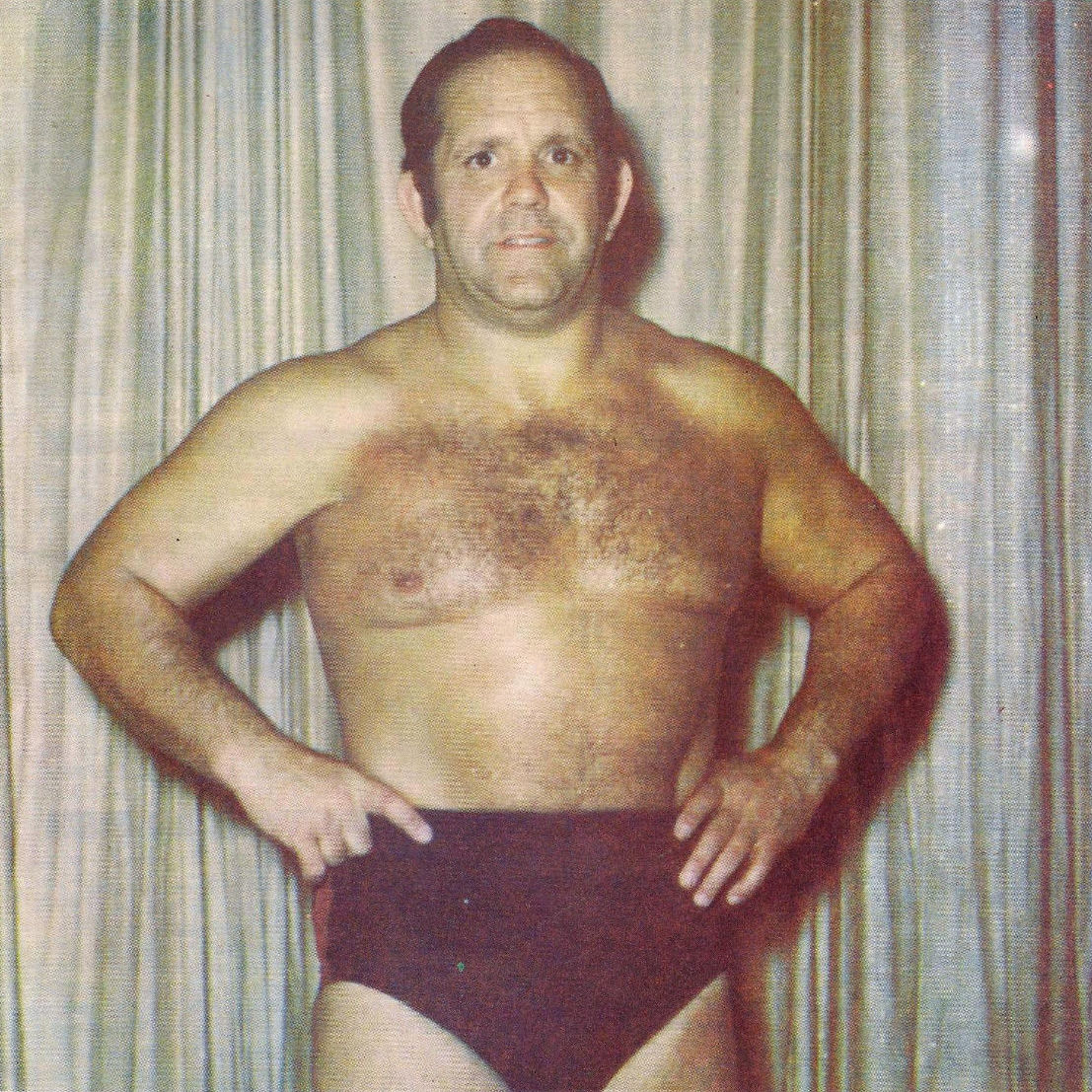
- Royal in 1976

Personal information
- Born: Nelson Combs; July 21, 1935 Wheelwright, Kentucky, U.S.
- Died: February 3, 2002 (aged 66) Mooresville, North Carolina, U.S.
- Cause of death: Myocardial infarction
- Spouse: Karen Royal
- Children: 3

Professional wrestling career
- Ring name(s): Medic #1; Nelson Royal
- Billed height: 5 ft 8 in (1.73 m)
- Billed weight: 216 lb (98 kg)
- Billed from: "London, England" (as Sir Nelson Royal)
- Trained by: Don Eagle
- Debut: 1955
- Retired: 1989

Nelson Combs (July 21, 1935 – February 3, 2002) was an American professional wrestler, trainer and promoter, better known by his ring name, Nelson Royal. He held the NWA World Junior Heavyweight Championship on six occasions along with numerous regional championships.

== Early life ==
Combs was born on July 21, 1935, in Wheelwright, Kentucky. As a youth, he participated in amateur wrestling. While competing in an amateur wrestling contest in Columbus, Ohio, he met professional wrestler Don Eagle, who agreed to train him.

== Professional wrestling career ==
=== Early career (1955–1965) ===
Combs was trained as a professional wrestler by Eagle, debuting in 1955 in the Midwest Wrestling Alliance promotion under the ring name Nelson Royal. In the late 1950s, Royal wrestled for the Portland, Oregon–based promotion Pacific Northwest Wrestling, where, in 1958, he briefly held the NWA Pacific Northwest Tag Team Championship with Black Hawk, and for the Texas-based promotion Big Time Wrestling.

In 1962, Royal adopted the character of "Sir Nelson Royal", a "pompous, overbearing Englishman in tails and a top hat". He formed a tag team with The Viking (Bob Morse).

In the early 1960s, Royal wrestled for the Kansas City, Missouri–based promotion Heart of America Sports Attractions as "Medic #1", one-half of the tag team The Medics with Medic #2 (Pedro Gordy). In January 1961, The Medics won a tournament to become the inaugural NWA Central States Tag Team Champions, losing the championship to Bulldog Austin and Tarzan Kowalski later that year. In June 1963, The Medics briefly held the NWA World Tag Team Championship (Central States version).

On May 7, 1964, Royal teamed with Wahoo McDaniel in a loss to "Gorgeous Gus", a black bear.

=== Mid-Atlantic mainstay (1965–1983) ===
In 1965, Royal abandoned his aristocratic character and adopted the character of a good-natured cowboy. In 1966, he formed a tag team with Tex McKenzie.

In 1968, Royal formed a tag team with Paul Jones in the North Carolina–based promotion Mid-Atlantic Championship Wrestling. In 1969, Royal briefly wrestled for the Los Angeles, California–based promotion NWA Hollywood Wrestling, where he and Jones held the NWA Americas Tag Team Championship. In September 1970, the duo defeated The Minnesota Wrecking Crew to win the NWA Atlantic Coast Tag Team Championship. They lost the championship to The Blond Bombers in December 1970. Royal held the championship once more in 1973, this time with Sandy Scott.

In the mid-1970s, Royal wrestled for the Knoxville, Tennessee–based promotion Southeastern Championship Wrestling. He held the NWA Tennessee Tag Team Championship on three occasions in 1975: twice with Les Thatcher and once with Ron Wright.

On December 6, 1976, Royal defeated Ron Starr to win the NWA World Junior Heavyweight Championship. He lost the championship to Chavo Guerrero, Sr. in February 1978, regaining it the following month and losing it to Guerrero once more in April 1978. In July 1979, Royal won the championship for a third time, defeating Al Madril by forfeit. Royal held the championship until December of that year before vacating it upon retiring from professional wrestling. His father was in ill health, and Nelson operated his farm as well as his own western wear business.

=== Late career (1983–1989) ===
Royal broke his retirement in 1983, wrestling a handful of matches over the following years before returning to a fuller schedule in 1986. At Starrcade '86: The Skywalkers on November 27, 1986, Royal appeared in a vignette promoting the upcoming Bunkhouse Stampede, in which he sat by a campfire explaining the rules of the match.

Royal was involved in the creation of the Big Gold Belt, serving as the contact between Jim Crockett Jr., who commissioned it, and Charles Crumrine, whose shop made the belt. His name appears on the back of the main plate along with the maker's hallmark.

In early 1987, Royal made a second tour with All Japan Pro Wrestling. In October of that year, Royal won the NWA World Junior Heavyweight Championship for a fourth time. He lost the championship to Scott Armstrong twice, on both occasions quickly regaining it, before finally vacating it upon his retirement from professional wrestling in 1989.

In 1989, Royal founded Atlantic Coast Wrestling, a short-lived independent promotion.

Royal ran a professional wrestling school in Mooresville, North Carolina, with Gene Anderson. Wrestlers trained by Royal included Rockin' Robin, Johnny Ace, and Ken Shamrock.

== Personal life ==
Royal was married to Karen L. Royal. He had three children: two sons and a daughter. His daughter, Shannon Lloyd McCrary, performed as a valet in USA Championship Wrestling and Atlantic Coast Wrestling under the ring name "Sha Sha".

Royal settled in Mooresville, North Carolina, where he owned a ranch. Royal opened Nelson Royal's Western Store, a store specializing in western wear, cowboy boots and horse tack, in Mooresville in 1967. He was active in Crime Stoppers and Drug Abuse Resistance Education.

== Death ==
Royal developed Alzheimer's disease in his later years. He died from a myocardial infarction on February 3, 2002, at the age of 66.

== Championships and accomplishments ==
- Cauliflower Alley Club
  - Other honoree (1996)
- Heart of America Sports Attractions
  - NWA Central States Tag Team Championship (1 time) – with Medic #2
  - NWA World Tag Team Championship (Central States version) (1 time) – with Medic #2
- Mid-Atlantic Championship Wrestling
  - NWA Atlantic Coast Tag Team Championship (2 times) – with Paul Jones (1 time) and Sandy Scott (1 time)
- National Wrestling Alliance
  - NWA World Junior Heavyweight Championship (6 times)
- NWA Hollywood Wrestling
  - NWA Americas Tag Team Championship (1 time) – with Paul Jones
- NWA Wrestling Legends Hall of Heroes
  - Class of 2009
- Pacific Northwest Wrestling
  - NWA Pacific Northwest Tag Team Championship (1 time) – with Black Hawk
- Southeastern Championship Wrestling
  - NWA Tennessee Tag Team Championship (3 times) – with Les Thatcher (2 times) and Ron Wright (1 time)
