= Ron Bass (wrestler) =

American professional wrestler (1948–2017)

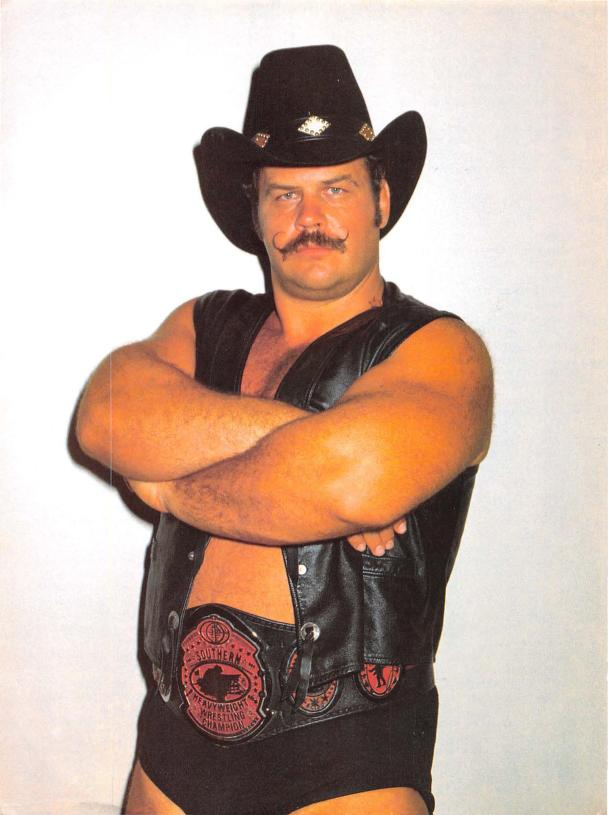
- Bass as the NWA Southern Heavyweight Champion, c. 1983

Personal information
- Born: Ronald Heard; December 21, 1948 Harrisburg, Arkansas, U.S.
- Died: March 7, 2017 (aged 68) Tampa, Florida, U.S.
- Education: Arkansas State University

Professional wrestling career
- Ring name: Ron Bass
- Billed height: 6 ft 4 in (193 cm)
- Billed weight: 289 lb (131 kg)
- Billed from: Pampa, Texas; Houston, Texas (WWF)
- Debut: 1971
- Retired: 2013

Ronald Heard (December 21, 1948 – March 7, 2017) was an American professional wrestler, best known under the ring name "Outlaw" Ron Bass. His gimmick was a Texan cowboy who entered rings to the sound of a bullwhip.

== Professional wrestling career ==
=== National Wrestling Alliance (1971–1987) ===
Heard started wrestling as Ron Bass in 1971 in the Gulf Coast territory. Throughout the 1970s, he performed primarily in National Wrestling Alliance territories. He was known as "Cowboy" Ron Bass, Sam Oliver Bass, and "Outlaw" Ron Bass, depending on which territory he was working at the time.

In the early 1980s, he wrestled in Championship Wrestling from Florida and Jim Crockett Promotions, frequently teaming with Black Bart as The Long Riders in both promotions. He also teamed and feuded with Barry Windham in Florida. As a face he would feud with Angelo Mosca and Kendo Nagasaki. Bass would later turn heel after turning on Dusty Rhodes during a match where Bass was a special referee in a match against Harley Race, costing Rhodes the NWA title. Bass' feud with Barry Windham (over a saddle given to Bass by Dusty Rhodes) led to Windham losing a "loser-leaves-town" match to Bass and coming back to wrestle as the masked "Dirty Yellow Dog. "

=== World Wrestling Federation (1987–1989) ===
Bass (right) facing Brutus Beefcake, c. 1988

In January 1987, Bass (using the "Outlaw" name) went to the World Wrestling Federation (WWF), where he voiced challenges to the likes of WWF Champion Hulk Hogan and Brutus Beefcake. A feud between Bass and Blackjack Mulligan appeared to be in the works over which one was the toughest wrestler to come out of Texas, but Mulligan abruptly left the WWF before any matches could take place between the two. Bass would then settle into a role in the midcard position, wrestling against Hillbilly Jim, Lanny Poffo and Sam Houston. Later on he was part of the five-man team captained by The Honky Tonk Man at the inaugural Survivor Series pay-per-view on Thanksgiving Day, 1987. He also participated in the very first Royal Rumble and the 20-man battle royal at WrestleMania IV. He was eliminated at the latter event by the Junkyard Dog; a feud between the two began in the months after WrestleMania after Bass choked and dragged the Dog with his bullwhip, "Miss Betsy," in a sneak attack on Wrestling Challenge. He also joined Gorilla Monsoon at the broadcast table one week on Wrestling Challenge to cover for Bobby "The Brain" Heenan, who was recovering from his storyline injury from Ken Patera.

At the 1988 King of the Ring tournament, Bass qualified for the final after beating a young Shawn Michaels but was paid by Ted DiBiase to fake an injury. Bass began a feud with Beefcake in August 1988, gouging Beefcake's head open with his spurs ("Bret" and "Bart") on an episode of Superstars of Wrestling; the attack caused Beefcake to miss his scheduled Intercontinental championship match against the Honky Tonk Man at the first SummerSlam event on August 29. Bass and Honky co-captained a five-man contingent against a team captained by Beefcake and the Ultimate Warrior at the second Survivor Series in November. Bass and teammate Greg Valentine were eliminated by Warrior in succession in the final minute of the match. On the January 7, 1989 Saturday Night's Main Event XIX, Bass lost to Beefcake via sleeperhold in a hair vs. hair match. He competed in the 1989 Royal Rumble (sans hair). After Bass' feud with Beefcake, he was used mainly as a preliminary wrestler and left the WWF in March.

=== Retirement ===
Bass wrestled in the independents before retiring in 1991 due to the injuries sustained over his career.

In 2005, he returned to wrestling making an appearance at WrestleReunion on January 29 and teamed with Larry Zbyszko to defeat Barry Windham and Mike Rotunda. He continued to work in the independents until retiring for good in 2013.

Bass starred in the film Silent Times directed by Geoff Blanchette and Christopher Annino, which was released in 2018. Bass plays a 1920s professional football coach named Coach Joseph Arcarese.

== Personal life and death ==
After retiring, Heard returned to Tampa, Florida, where he golfed, became religious, and earned a bachelor's degree from Arkansas State University. Subsequently, he worked in sales in Florida's construction market. He also became an Amway salesman in the Tampa area. He had one son, named Joe, who debuted as a professional wrestler in September 2019, competing under the ring name Ron Bass Jr.

In July 2016, Heard was named part of a class action lawsuit filed against WWE which alleged that wrestlers incurred traumatic brain injuries during their tenure and that the company concealed the risks of injury. The suit was litigated by attorney Konstantine Kyros, who has been involved in a number of other lawsuits against WWE, primarily after the chronic traumatic encephalopathy investigation into Chris Benoit and other wrestlers. Following his death in March 2017, Kyros' law firm received a postmortem report in December 2018 from the Heard family stating he had suffered from chronic traumatic encephalopathy, which has become common among professional wrestlers. Over a year after his death, US District Judge Vanessa Lynne Bryant dismissed the lawsuit in September 2018.

In March 2017, Heard was hospitalized due to a burst appendix. He died on March 7, 2017, at the age of 68 due to complications following surgery.

== Championships and accomplishments ==
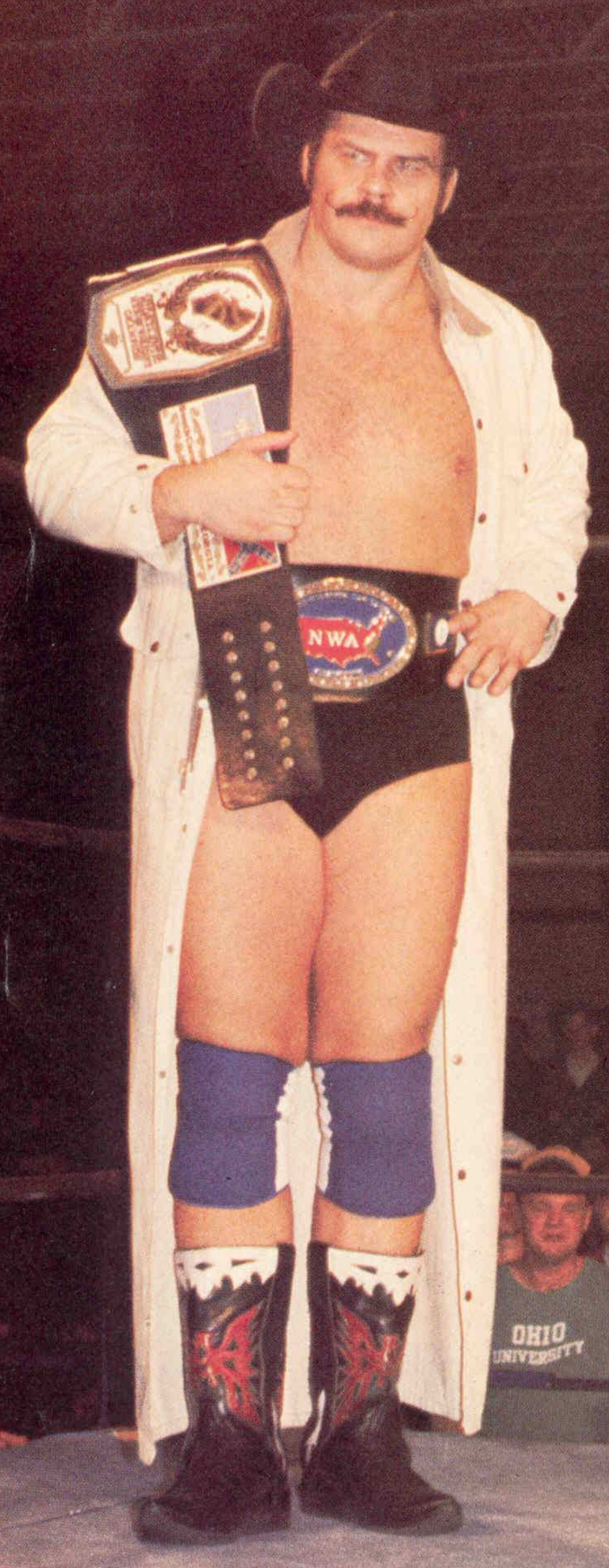
Bass as the NWA Mid-Atlantic Heavyweight Champion and NWA Mid-Atlantic Tag Team Champion, c. 1985

- All Japan Pro Wrestling
  - NWA International Tag Team Championship (1 time) - with Stan Hansen
- Central States Wrestling
  - NWA Central States World Tag Team Championship (2 times) - with Dutch Mantel
- Championship Wrestling from Florida
  - NWA Florida Bahamian Championship (1 time)
  - NWA Florida Global Tag Team Championship (1 time) - with Barry Windham
  - NWA Florida Heavyweight Championship (2 times)
  - NWA Southern Heavyweight Championship (Florida version) (2 times)
  - NWA United States Tag Team Championship (Florida version) (4 times) - with Black Bart (3), and One Man Gang (1)
- Georgia Championship Wrestling
  - NWA National Heavyweight Championship (1 time)
- Gulf Coast Championship Wrestling - Southeastern Championship Wrestling
  - NWA Gulf Coast Heavyweight Championship (1 time)
  - NWA Gulf Coast Tag Team Championship (2 times) – with Don Bass (1) and Dutch Bass (1)
  - NWA Southeastern Heavyweight Championship (Northern Division) (1 time)
  - NWA Southeastern Tag Team Championship (1 time) - with Randy Rose
  - NWA Tennessee Tag Team Championship (2 times) - with Don Bass
- Mid-Atlantic Championship Wrestling / Jim Crockett Promotions
  - NWA Brass Knuckles Championship (Mid-Atlantic version) (1 time)
  - NWA Mid-Atlantic Heavyweight Championship (1 time)
  - NWA Mid-Atlantic Tag Team Championship (1 time) - with Black Bart
  - NWA Television Championship (1 time)
- NWA Hollywood Wrestling
  - NWA Americas Tag Team Championship (3 times) - with Dr. Hiro Ota (1), Moondog Lonnie Mayne (1), and Roddy Piper (1)
- NWA Mid-America / Continental Wrestling Association
  - AWA Southern Heavyweight Championship (2 times)
  - AWA Southern Tag Team Championship (1 time) - with Stan Lane
  - NWA Mid-America Heavyweight Championship (1 time)
  - NWA United States Tag Team Championship (Mid-America version) (1 time) – with Don Bass
- NWA Tri-State
  - NWA Arkansas Heavyweight Championship (1 time)
- Pacific Northwest Wrestling
  - NWA Pacific Northwest Heavyweight Championship (1 time)
  - NWA Pacific Northwest Tag Team Championship (2 times) - with John Anson (1) and Moondog Mayne (1)
- Pro Wrestling Illustrated
  - PWI ranked him # 294 of the 500 best singles wrestlers during the "PWI Years" in 2003.
- Ring Around The Northwest Newsletter
  - Wrestler of the Year (1977)
- Other Titles
  - Fort Myers Heavyweight Championship ( 2 times )
