= Diving at the 1968 Summer Olympics – Men's 10 metre platform =

Men's 10 metre platform at the Games of the XIX Olympiad
- Venue: Alberca Olímpica Francisco Marquéz
- Date: 24–25 October (Preliminary); 26 October (Finals)
- Competitors: 35 from 17 nations

Medalists
1st place, gold medalist(s)		Klaus Dibiasi	Italy
2nd place, silver medalist(s)		Álvaro Gaxiola	Mexico
3rd place, bronze medalist(s)		Win Young	United States

The men's 10 metre platform, also reported as high diving or platform diving, was one of four diving events on the Diving at the 1968 Summer Olympics programme. It was the 14th appearance of the event, which has been held at every Olympic Games since the 1904 Summer Olympics.

== Competition format ==
The competition was split into two phases:

1. Preliminary round (24–25 October)
  Divers performed six compulsory dives with limited degrees of difficulty and one voluntary dives without limits. The twelve divers with the highest scores advanced to the final.
2. Final (26 October)
  Divers performed three voluntary dives without limit of degrees of difficulty. The final ranking was determined by the combined score with the preliminary round.

== Schedule ==
All times are Central Time Zone (UTC-6)

Date	Time	Round
Thursday-Friday, 24–25 October 1968	17:00	Preliminary
Saturday, 26 October 1968	17:00	Final

== Results ==
Rank	Diver	Nation	Preliminary		Final					
Rank	Diver	Nation	Points	Rank	Dive 1	Dive 2	Dive 3	Points	Rank	Total
1st place, gold medalist(s)	Klaus Dibiasi	Italy	108.04	1	19.92	20.02	16.20	56.14	1	164.18
2nd place, silver medalist(s)	Álvaro Gaxiola	Mexico	103.33	2	16.08	16.10	18.98	51.16	4	154.49
3rd place, bronze medalist(s)	Win Young	United States	99.98	4	15.39	17.68	20.88	53.95	2	153.93
4	Keith Russell	United States	101.38	3	18.72	11.07	21.17	50.96	5	152.34
5	José Robinson	Mexico	91.16	11	18.00	17.82	16.64	52.46	3	143.62
6	Lothar Matthes	East Germany	92.19	7	14.72	16.90	17.94	49.56	6	141.75
7	Luis Niño	Mexico	93.66	6	14.16	15.66	17.68	47.50	7	141.16
8	Franco Cagnotto	Italy	94.73	5	15.08	13.68	15.40	44.16	10	138.89
9	Mikhail Safonov	Soviet Union	91.43	10	14.30	15.64	17.40	47.34	8	138.77
10	Vladimir Vasin	Soviet Union	91.91	9	17.52	15.86	13.11	46.49	9	138.40
11	Tord Andersson	Sweden	92.06	8	12.65	14.74	11.76	39.15	12	131.21
12	Bernd Wucherpfennig	West Germany	89.66	12	15.41	15.84	8.58	39.83	11	129.49
13	Włodzimierz Mejsak	Poland	89.41	13	did not advance					
14	Karl-Heinz Schwemmer	West Germany	89.00	14	did not advance					
15	Donald Wagstaff	Australia	88.99	15	did not advance					
16	Viktor Pogozhev	Soviet Union	86.89	16	did not advance					
17	Richard Gilbert	United States	86.70	17	did not advance					
18	Klaus Konzorr	West Germany	86.69	18	did not advance					
19	Waguih Aboul Seoud	Egypt	85.89	19	did not advance					
20	Rolf Sperling	East Germany	85.51	20	did not advance					
21	Jakub Puchow	Poland	85.14	21	did not advance					
22	Jerzy Kowalewski	Poland	85.08	22	did not advance					
23	Junji Yuasa	Japan	84.10	23	did not advance					
24	Toshio Otsubo	Japan	83.18	24	did not advance					
25	Bob Eaton	Canada	82.09	25	did not advance					
26	Yosuke Arimitsu	Japan	81.72	26	did not advance					
27	Robin Baskerville	Great Britain	81.23	27	did not advance					
28	David Priestley	Great Britain	80.30	28	did not advance					
29	José Ponce	Cuba	80.02	29	did not advance					
30	Alberto Moreno	Cuba	78.28	30	did not advance					
31	Song Jae-Ung	South Korea	77.30	31	did not advance					
32	Diego Heñao	Colombia	74.09	32	did not advance					
33	Kenneth Sully	Canada	65.41	33	did not advance					
34	Jerry Anderson	Puerto Rico	65.14	34	did not advance					
35	Héctor Bas	Puerto Rico	47.97	35	did not advance					
-	Edwin Barrundia	Guatemala	DNS	-	did not advance					

== Sources ==
- Organising Committee of the Games of the XIX Olympiad (October 1969). The Official Report of the Games of the XIX Olympiad Mexico 1968, Volume 3: The Games (pdf) (in French and English). Mexico: The Organising Committee for The Games of the XVIII Olympiad. pp. pp. 737–8.
