= Starrcade '85: The Gathering =

1985 Jim Crockett Promotions closed-circuit television event

- DVD cover featuring Ric Flair and Dusty Rhodes.
- Promotion(s): National Wrestling Alliance; Jim Crockett Promotions
- Date: November 28, 1985
- City: Greensboro, North Carolina; Atlanta, Georgia
- Venue: Greensboro Coliseum Complex; Omni Coliseum
- Attendance: 30,000 (combined)
- Tagline: The Gathering

Starrcade chronology
← Previous; 1984	Next → 1986

Starrcade '85: The Gathering was the third annual Starrcade professional wrestling closed-circuit television event produced by Jim Crockett Promotions under the National Wrestling Alliance (NWA) banner. It took place on November 28, 1985, from the Greensboro Coliseum Complex in Greensboro, North Carolina and Omni Coliseum in Atlanta, Georgia, with the event going back and forth from both arenas.

The main event was between Ric Flair and Dusty Rhodes for the NWA World Heavyweight Championship in a rematch from the prior year's Starrcade. Their feud escalated when Flair broke Rhodes' ankle in September 1985. After the event, Flair formed the Four Horsemen stable, and continued to feud with Rhodes. Other matches included Magnum T. A. and Tully Blanchard in an "I Quit" steel cage match for the NWA United States Heavyweight Championship, and the Rock 'n' Roll Express and the team of Ivan Koloff and Nikita Koloff in a steel cage match for the NWA World Tag Team Championship.

In 2014, the WWE Network included the previous Starrcades (1983–1986), which had been transmitted via closed-circuit television, alongside the rest of the Starrcades in the pay-per-view section.

== Background ==
Ric Flair, the NWA World Heavyweight Champion in 1985.

The main feud heading into Starrcade was between Ric Flair and Dusty Rhodes over the NWA World Heavyweight Championship. Flair was in his third reign as the champion, and his reign at the time had lasted over a year. On September 29 at the Omni in Atlanta, after Flair defeated Nikita Koloff in a steel cage match, Nikita and Ivan Koloff attacked Flair until Rhodes came and fought them off. Ole and Arn Anderson then came, and, along with Flair, beat down Rhodes. Flair broke Rhodes' left ankle with a diving knee drop, and applied the figure four leglock.

Previous Starrcade events were held at the Greensboro Coliseum, with this the first to expand to two locations, both served by closed-circuit television. This was the first event broadcast live from two locations. In 1985, the competing World Wrestling Federation created WrestleMania, and WrestleMania 2 took place in three locations as a response to Starrcade '85.

== Event ==
Other on-screen personnel
Role:	Name:
Commentator	Bob Caudle
Commentator	Tony Schiavone
Interviewer	Johnny Weaver
Referee	Sonny Fargo
Referee	Earl Hebner
Referee	Stu Shwartz
Referee	Steve Gregory
Referee	Tommy Young
Referee	Gene Ligon
Ring announcer	Tom Miller (Greensboro)
Ring announcer	Rodger Kent (Atlanta)

The first match of the event was between Krusher Khruschev and Sam Houston for the vacant NWA Mid-Atlantic Heavyweight Championship. The match started back and forth until Houston gained the advantage with the side headlock. Khruschev fought back with a flapjack. Khruschev climbed the turnbuckles, but Houston stopped him with a dropkick. After performing a bulldog, Houston attempted to pin Khruschev, but Khruschev placed his foot on the ropes. Houston believed he had won, and Khruschev pinned him after performing a clothesline to win the match and the title. Houston had a foot on the ropes, undetected by the referee.

The second match was a Mexican Death match between Abdullah the Butcher and Manny Fernandez. Abdullah had the early advantage, attacking Fernandez's head with weapons. Fernandez fought back and attacked Abdullah with his boot and belt. Fernandez performed a Flying Burrito and a flying clothesline, but missed a splash. Abdullah attempted a turnbuckle thrust in the corner, but Fernandez avoided it, and Abdullah's shoulder hit the ringpost. Fernandez then retrieved the sombrero to win the match.

The third match was a Texas Bullrope match between Black Bart and Ron Bass. If Bass won, he would receive a match with J. J. Dillon. The match started back and forth until Bart missed a clothesline, and sent himself outside the ring. Bass had the advantage with the use of the cowbell. Bart fought back briefly until both were knocked down after a shoulder block by Bass. Bass then avoided a fist drop and attacked Bart with the cowbell. After avoiding a corner clothesline, Bass hit Bart in the head with the cowbell from the second turnbuckle and pinned him to win the match.

The fourth match was a Texas Bullrope match between Bass and Dillon. Immediately after the previous match, Dillon entered the ring and attacked Bass. Bass fought back with the cowbell, but accidentally hit the referee. Bart performed a piledriver on Bass, after which Dillon pinned Bass.

The fifth match was between The Barbarian (accompanied by Paul Jones) and Superstar Billy Graham. Before the match, Graham and The Barbarian had an arm wrestling match. Graham was about to win when Jones attacked him with a cane, and Graham won the match by disqualification, and $10,000. The wrestling match started immediately with The Barbarian having the advantage, and attacking Graham's head. Graham avoided a diving headbutt and applied a bear hug. As The Barbarian was about to pass out from the hold, Jones attacked Graham with the cane. Graham won by disqualification. The Barbarian attacked Graham after the match until being stopped by the referee.

The sixth match was between Buddy Landel and Terry Taylor for the NWA National Heavyweight Championship. The match went back and forth, and J. J. Dillon came to ringside during the match. As Taylor applied a headlock, Landel pushed him into the referee, knocking the official down. Dillon climbed up to the ring apron and attempted to attack Taylor with a shoe. Taylor sent Landel into Dillon, and placed Landel on the top turnbuckle. Taylor attempted a superplex, but Dillon tripped him. Landel fell on top of Taylor, pinning him to win the match and the title.

The seventh match was between Ole and Arn Anderson and the team of Wahoo McDaniel and Billy Jack Haynes for the NWA National Tag Team Championship. The match began with Haynes and McDaniel having the advantage. The Andersons fought back, targeting McDaniel's left arm. Haynes tagged in to resume the advantage. As McDaniel attacked Arn in the corner, Ole tripped him, and Arn pinned McDaniel as Ole held onto his foot. The Andersons won the match and retained the title.

The eighth match was an "I Quit" match in a steel cage between Magnum T. A. and Tully Blanchard (accompanied by Baby Doll) for the NWA United States Heavyweight Championship. The match started back and forth. Blanchard applied the camel clutch, and Magnum T. A. performed a gorilla press drop onto the top rope. Blanchard attacked Magnum T. A. with the microphone and the cage, and countered mounted punches with an inverted atomic drop. Blanchard knocked down the referee, and Baby Doll threw a wooden chair into the ring. Blanchard attempted to use a sharp piece from the chair as a weapon, but T. A. blocked it and used the weapon on Blanchard's forehead, forcing him to give up. Magnum T. A. won the match and the title. The match is widely considered one of the best in history and popularized the I Quit match.

The ninth match was an Atlanta Street Fight between The Midnight Express (Bobby Eaton and Dennis Condrey) (accompanied by Jim Cornette) and the team of Jimmy Valiant and Miss Atlanta Lively. The match started with Valiant and Lively having the advantage until Eaton sent Valiant outside, and double-teamed Lively with Condrey. Valiant returned to the ring, but The Midnight Express performed a double clothesline on him. Eaton attempted to jump from the top turnbuckle onto Valiant, but Lively caught him with a European uppercut. Lively pinned Eaton to win the match.

The tenth match was a steel cage match between The Rock 'n' Roll Express (Ricky Morton and Robert Gibson) and the team of Ivan and Nikita Koloff for the NWA World Tag Team Championship. The match started back and forth. The Rock 'n' Roll Express had the advantage over Ivan after a dropkick from Gibson. The Koloffs fought back and dominated Gibson. As Ivan attacked Gibson, Morton tagged in, undetected by Ivan. After Ivan performed a back body drop to Gibson, Morton pinned Ivan with a roll-up to win the match and the title. After the match, the Koloffs, along with Krusher Khruschev, beat Gibson down with a chain.

Dusty Rhodes, after winning the NWA World Heavyweight Championship

The main event was between Dusty Rhodes and Ric Flair for the NWA World Heavyweight Championship. Rhodes took the early advantage with a series of bionic elbows. Rhodes targeted Flair's right foot and sent it into the ringpost. After throwing Flair from the top turnbuckle, Rhodes attempted to apply the figure four leglock. Flair kicked him off, and Rhodes hurt his injured left ankle. Flair failed to apply the figure four leglock, and Rhodes sent Flair outside. Rhodes sent Flair's head into the ringpost and guard rail, and performed a diving crossbody and mounted punches. Rhodes then missed a kick with his left foot, and Flair gained the advantage. Flair targeted the left leg, and applied the figure four leglock. Flair broke the hold when Rhodes rolled onto his stomach. After exchanging attacks, Rhodes performed a clothesline, and pulled Flair into the referee, knocking him outside the ring. Rhodes applied the figure four leglock, as the Andersons came out to interfere. Rhodes kicked Arn out, but Ole performed a high knee to Rhodes from behind. A new referee came in to officiate, and as Flair picked up Rhodes, Rhodes pinned him with an inside cradle to win the match and the title.

== Aftermath ==
After Starrcade, Dusty Rhodes' victory was reversed by Tommy Young. The outcome of the match was changed to Rhodes winning by disqualification due to interference from Arn Anderson, and Ric Flair remained NWA World Heavyweight Champion. Soon after, in January 1986, Flair formed the Four Horsemen stable with Arn Anderson, Ole Anderson and Tully Blanchard, with J. J. Dillon as their manager. Flair, along with the Four Horsemen, continued his feud with Rhodes. Rhodes won the title for the third and last time from Flair during the Great American Bash tour in 1986, but Flair regained it shortly after. The feud between Flair and Rhodes was one of the biggest in Flair's career.

When Baby Doll was dropped by Tully Blanchard as his valet, she became Dusty Rhodes' valet for most of 1986. Ole Anderson was (kayfabe) injured in a match with Rhodes and the Road Warriors resulting in the National Tag Team titles being vacated and repackaged as the United States Tag Team titles. Anderson did not return to action until June 1986. After Buddy Landel was released, the National Heavyweight title went to Dusty Rhodes; it was unified in 1986 with the United States Heavyweight title. Terry Taylor moved to the UWF and became one of the territory's top stars. Krusher Khrushchev lost the Mid-Atlantic Heavyweight title to Sam Houston in January 1986. A legitimate knee injury kept him out for six months, while Houston lost the title to Black Bart before moving to Central States after JCP purchased the territory late in 1986. WWF expansion also hit JCP, as Ron Bass. Billy Jack Haynes, and Superstar Billy Graham went there in 1986.

The Rock & Roll Express and Midnight Express resumed their feud that began in Mid-South Wrestling, with the teams exchanging the NWA World Tag Team Championship during 1986. Jimmy Valiant continued his feud with Paul Jones into 1986, as Jones formed an "army" with The Barbarian, Baron Von Raschke, Teijho Khan, and Pistol Pez Whatley (who turned heel as "Shaska" Whatley).

== Results ==
#	Results from the Greensboro Coliseum	Stipulations	Times
1	Krusher Khruschev defeated Sam Houston	Singles match for the vacant NWA Mid-Atlantic Heavyweight Championship	9:30
3	Ron Bass defeated Black Bart (with J. J. Dillon)	Texas Bullrope match	8:34
4	J. J. Dillon (with Black Bart) defeated Ron Bass	Texas Bullrope match	3:29
7	Buddy Landel (with J. J. Dillon) defeated Terry Taylor (c)	Singles match for the NWA National Heavyweight Championship	10:30
9	Magnum T. A. defeated Tully Blanchard (c) (with Baby Doll)	"I Quit" steel cage match for the NWA United States Heavyweight Championship	14:43
11	Rock 'n' Roll Express (Ricky Morton and Robert Gibson) (with Don Kernodle) defeated Ivan Koloff and Nikita Koloff (c) (with Krusher Khruschev)	Steel cage match for the NWA World Tag Team Championship	12:22
No.	Results from The Omni	Stipulations	Times
2	Manny Fernandez defeated Abdullah the Butcher (with Paul Jones)	Mexican Death match	9:07
5	Superstar Billy Graham defeated The Barbarian (with Paul Jones)	Arm wrestling match	N/A
6	Superstar Billy Graham defeated The Barbarian (with Paul Jones) by disqualification	Singles match	3:02
8	The Minnesota Wrecking Crew (Ole Anderson and Arn Anderson) (c) defeated Billy Jack Haynes and Wahoo McDaniel	Tag team match for the NWA National Tag Team Championship	9:28
10	Jimmy Valiant and Miss Atlanta Lively (with Big Mama) defeated The Midnight Express (Bobby Eaton and Dennis Condrey) (with Jim Cornette)	Atlanta Street fight	6:36
12	Dusty Rhodes defeated Ric Flair (c) by disqualification (Note: Stu Shwartz, replacement referee counted the pin after Senior Referee, Tommy Young was knocked down. Tommy Young later reversed this decision, and awarded Rhodes a victory by disqualification due to interference from Arn Anderson. Therefore, Flair remained World Champion.)	Singles match for the NWA World Heavyweight Championship	22:06
(c) – refers to the champion heading into the match
