= Robert Eaton =

Robert or Bob Eaton may refer to:

- Robert James Eaton (a.k.a. Bob Eaton, born 1940), auto executive
- Robert Eaton (politician) (1871–1964), former Alberta politician
- Robert G. Eaton (a.k.a. Bob Eaton, 1937–2009), politician in Ontario, Canada
- Robert Young Eaton (1875–1956), Canadian retailer
- Bobby Eaton (Robert Lee Eaton, 1958–2021), American wrestler
- Bob Eaton (diver) (born 1952), Canadian Olympic diver
- Bob Eaton (theatre director), English theatre director, writer and manager who has been featured at the Royal Court Theatre, Liverpool
