= Starrcade '86: The Skywalkers =

1986 Jim Crockett Promotions closed-circuit television event

- VHS cover featuring various wrestlers
- Promotion(s): National Wrestling Alliance; Jim Crockett Promotions
- Date: November 27, 1986
- City: Greensboro, North Carolina, United States; Atlanta, Georgia, United States
- Venue: Greensboro Coliseum Complex; Omni Coliseum
- Attendance: 30,000 (combined)
- Tagline: The Skywalkers

Starrcade chronology
| ← Previous; 1985 | Next → 1987 |

Starrcade '86: The Skywalkers, also referred to as Starrcade '86: Night of The Skywalkers, was the fourth annual Starrcade professional wrestling closed-circuit television event produced by Jim Crockett Promotions (JCP) under the National Wrestling Alliance (NWA) banner. It took place on November 27, 1986, from the Greensboro Coliseum Complex in Greensboro, North Carolina and the Omni Coliseum in Atlanta, Georgia.

The main event saw NWA World Heavyweight Champion Ric Flair defend against the NWA United States Champion Nikita Koloff in a title versus title match. Six matches took place in each location, with the Greensboro main event a steel cage match between defending NWA World Tag Team Champions the Rock 'n' Roll Express (Ricky Morton and their challengers, Ole Anderson and Arn Anderson). The "Skywalkers" tag line came from one of the featured matches in which the Road Warriors wrestled The Midnight Express in a scaffold match atop a 20-foot-tall scaffold erected above the ring.

Edited for time, the show was available for purchase through JCP on VHS tape. With the launch of the WWE Network in 2014, all closed-circuit television Starrcades (1983 through 1986) alongside the subsequent Starrcade shows appear in the pay-per-view section. The WWE Network versions of the shows were not edited, aside from some entrance music that was replaced due to copyright issues. At four hours, this edition of Starrcade is the longest in the event's history.

== Production ==
=== Background ===
From the 1960s to the 1980s, it was traditional for JCP to hold major events on Thanksgiving and Christmas, often at the Greensboro Coliseum in Greensboro, North Carolina in the center of JCP's territory. In 1983, JCP created Starrcade to continue the Thanksgiving tradition, bringing in wrestlers from other NWA affiliates and broadcasting the show throughout its territory via closed-circuit television. Starrcade was the flagship event each year for JCP featuring their most important feuds and marquee matches. The 1986 event was the fourth show to use the Starrcade name, and the last to take place in two different locations.

=== Storylines ===
The show featured wrestlers involved in pre-existing, scripted feuds, plots, and storylines. Wrestlers were portrayed as either heels (villainous characters) or faces (heroic characters) as they followed a series of tension-building events, leading to a wrestling match.

Magnum T. A. was originally set to face Ric Flair at Starrcade '86, but a car accident ended his career weeks before the event. Nikita Koloff, engaged in a feud with Ron Garvin at the time, replaced T. A. in the main event.

== Event ==
Other on-screen personnel
| Role: | Name: |
|---|---|
| Commentator (Greensboro) | Bob Caudle |
| Commentator (Greensboro) | Johnny Weaver |
| Commentator (Atlanta) | Tony Schiavone |
| Commentator (Atlanta) | Rick Stewart |
| Interviewer | Johnny Weaver (Greensboro) |
| Interviewer | Rick Stewart (Atlanta) |
| Referee | Sonny Fargo |
| Referee | Scrappy McGowan |
| Referee | Earl Hebner |
| Referee | Tommy Young |
| Ring Announcer | Tom Miller (Greensboro) |
| Ring Announcer | Tony Schiavone (Atlanta) |

Starrcade '86 was broadcast live on closed-circuit TV to both arenas and throughout JCP's territory to other arenas. Alternating between venues, the show began with Tim Horner and Nelson Royal defeating Rocky and Don Kernodle in Greensboro, then switching to Atlanta, alternating until Ric Flair and Nikita Koloff faced off in the main event at The Omni. Switching between venues allowed the Atlanta crowd to watch The Road Warriors and the Midnight Express while the steel cage was set up in Greensboro for the match between the Rock 'n' Roll Express and the Andersons.

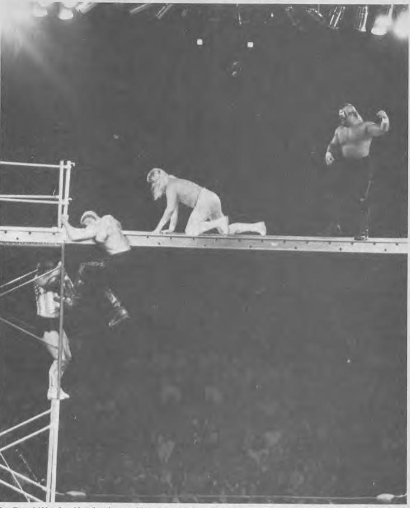
The scaffold match between the Road Warriors and the Midnight Express.

The Road Warriors won the "Night of the Skywalkers" scaffold match by knocking both members of the Midnight Express, Bobby Eaton and Dennis Condrey, off the scaffold to the ring below. After the match, the Road Warriors' manager Paul Ellering chased Jim Cornette up the scaffold. Cornette suffered a major knee injury when he fell from the scaffold to the ring. Big Bubba Rogers was meant to catch Cornette, but did not. Cornette landed badly and was carried from the ring. Road Warrior Hawk wrestled the match with a broken leg, an injury suffered in Japan the month before.

== Aftermath ==
Jimmy Valiant's years-long feud with Paul Jones finally at an end, Jones managed Rick Rude and Manny Fernandez to the NWA World Tag Team Championship (Mid-Atlantic version), then lost them back to the Rock 'n' Roll Express (in a phantom title switch) after Rude jumped to the WWF in 1987. Ole Anderson was kicked out of the Four Horsemen in February 1987, replaced by Lex Luger, with his performance in this match as well as being absent for his son's amateur wrestling matches the pretext for kicking him out. Tully Blanchard and Arn Anderson later won the NWA World Tag Team Championships twice as members of the Four Horsemen and the WWF World Tag Team Championship as the Brain Busters. Also forming a regular tandem were the newly babyface Nikita Koloff and his former enemy Dusty Rhodes - dubbed "the Superpowers", they won the 1987 Crockett Cup by defeating Blanchard and Luger in the final.

Big Bubba Rogers was moved to the Universal Wrestling Federation after JCP bought the territory in April 1987, winning the UWF Heavyweight Championship. After briefly returning to JCP, he went to the WWF as The Big Boss Man. Jimmy Garvin turned face in 1987 after his stepfather (kayfabe brother) Ron Garvin had his face burned at the hands of Cornette and the Midnight Express, and then challenged Ric Flair for the NWA World Heavyweight Championship on that summer's Great American Bash tour. Sam Houston married Baby Doll and went to the WWF. Also headed to the WWF shortly after this event was Krusher Khruschev who replaced Randy Colley in the role of Smash of Demolition in late January 1987 - the resulting "classic" Demolition line-up of Smash and Ax went on to win three WWF World Tag Team Championships, the first of these being the longest reign ever with the belts. Khruschev's spot in the Russian Team was taken by Vladimir Petrov.

== Results ==
| No. | Results | Stipulations | Times |
|---|---|---|---|
| 1 | Nelson Royal and Tim Horner defeated Don Kernodle and Rocky Kernodle | Tag team match | 7:30 |
| 2 | Brad Armstrong vs. Jimmy Garvin (with Precious) ended in a draw | Singles match | 15:00 |
| 3 | Baron von Raschke and Héctor Guerrero defeated The Barbarian and Shaska Whatley | Tag team match | 7:25 |
| 4 | Ivan Koloff and Krusher Khruschev (c) defeated the Kansas Jayhawks (Bobby Jaggers and Dutch Mantel) | Tag team match for the NWA United States Tag Team Championship (Mid-Atlantic version) | 9:10 |
| 5 | Wahoo McDaniel defeated Rick Rude (with Paul Jones) | Indian Strap match | 9:05 |
| 6 | Sam Houston (c) defeated Bill Dundee by disqualification | Singles match for the NWA Central States Heavyweight Championship | 10:24 |
| 7 | Jimmy Valiant (with Big Mama) defeated Paul Jones (with Manny Fernandez) | Hair vs. Hair match | 4:00 |
| 8 | Big Bubba Rogers (with Jim Cornette) defeated Ron Garvin | Street Fight | 11:50 |
| 9 | Tully Blanchard (with J. J. Dillon) defeated Dusty Rhodes (c) | First blood match for the NWA World Television Championship (Mid-Atlantic version) | 7:30 |
| 10 | The Road Warriors (Road Warrior Animal and Road Warrior Hawk) (with Paul Ellering) defeated the Midnight Express (Bobby Eaton and Dennis Condrey) (with Jim Cornette and Big Bubba Rogers) | Scaffold match | 7:00 |
| 11 | The Rock 'n' Roll Express (Ricky Morton and Robert Gibson) (c) defeated the Andersons (Ole Anderson and Arn Anderson) | Cage match for the NWA World Tag Team Championship (Mid-Atlantic version) | 20:20 |
| 12 | Ric Flair (c) vs. Nikita Koloff ended in a double disqualification | Singles match for the NWA World Heavyweight Championship | 20:00 |
(c) / – the champion(s) heading into the match
