= Edwin Young =

American diver (1947–2006)

Edwin (Win) Young
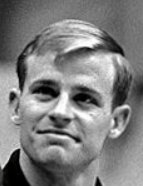
- Win Young, age 20, at the 1968 Olympics

Personal information
- Full name: Edwin Frank Young
- Born: September 29, 1947 Phoenix, Arizona, United States
- Died: June 22, 2006 (aged 58) Tucson, Arizona, United States
- Height: 1.75 m (5 ft 9 in)
- Weight: 63 kg (139 lb)

Sport
- Sport: Diving
- College team: Indiana University
- Club: Bloomington Swim Club; Indiana Hoosiers, Bloomington
- Coached by: Dick Smith (Smith Swim Gym); Hobie Billingsley (Indiana U)
Medal record
Representing the United States
Olympic Games
Bronze medal – third place	1968 Mexico City	10 m platform
Pan American Games
Gold medal – first place	1967 Winnipeg	10 m platform

Edwin Frank "Win" Young (September 29, 1947 – June 22, 2006) was an American diver who swam for Indiana University and represented the United States at the 1968 Summer Olympics in Mexico City, where he won a bronze medal in 10 m platform diving. He would later coach diving at West Point and the University of Arizona.

Born in Phoenix on September 29, 1947, to Mary W. and Edwin B. Young, he grew up in the Phoenix area, and graduated Central High School in 1965. While on a walk at the age of eight, he was struck by a car and suffered a broken leg that required pins to mend. Doctors believed the injury could be debilitating, but Young took up swim training at the YMCA to recover, and soon began to enter and win meets. Coached by Hall of Fame Diving Coach Dick Smith, Young swam for the Dick Smith Swim Gym at 14 placing fourth on the 3-meter board at the Southern Arizona Open AAU Swimming Championships on June 24, 1961. Smith, who served as head diving coach at Arizona State for a decade and was a seven-time U.S. Olympic Diving Coach, had owned and operated the Dick Smith Swim Gym in Phoenix, AZ since 1954. Diverse in his diving skills, Young also practiced on the 10-meter platform in High School.

As a 16-year old Central High School Junior, he was America's top-ranked High School diver, and had a third place ranking across all age groups. After several years of training and competition, he placed third in the National AAU Diving Championships in Chicago in 1963, also placing third in Arizona Gymnastics State competition on the trampoline.

== Indiana University ==
Young was a six-time All-American diver for Indiana University where he dove for Hall of Fame Dive Coach Hobie Billingsley. He was an All-American diver for Indiana six times, and placed consistently at the top in NCAA national meets, but was not a champion. In NCAA national competition in 1967, he placed second on the three-metre and third on the one-metre board. In 1968, he placed second on the three meter board. In his last year of NCAA competition in 1969, he was second on both the one and three meter boards. He won the gold medal in 10 m platform at the 1967 Pan American Games. In his last two years at Indiana, Win helped lead the Swimming and Diving team to NCAA national team titles in 1968 and 1969. He led Indiana swimming to win Big Ten titles in 1967, 1968, and 1969.

== 1968 Olympic Bronze Medal ==
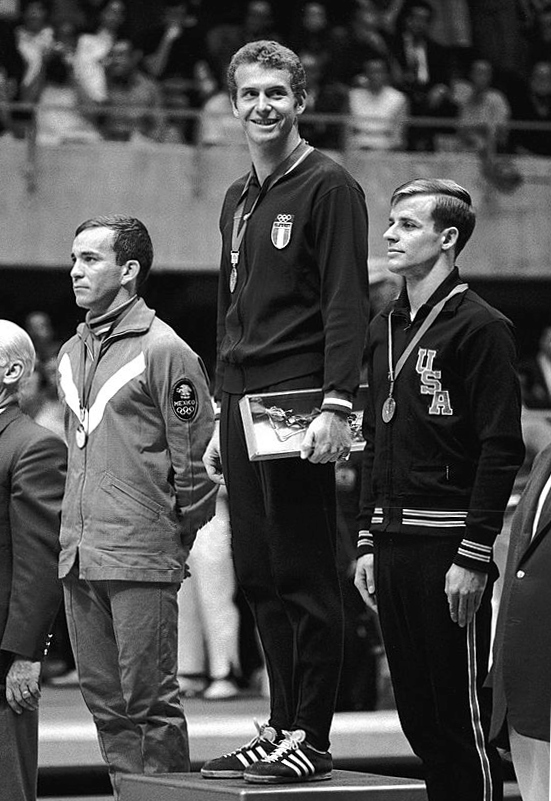
1968 Olympics, Young far right

He represented the United States at the 1968 Summer Olympics in Mexico City, where he won a bronze medal in the 10 m platform diving event. America had always won this event at the Olympics except for the 1912 Olympiad. In October, 1968 the favorite for the event was Italian Klaus Dibiasi, shown in the center on the podium photo at left. Dibiasi, the 1964 silver medalist and 1966 European Champion, took the early lead, held it through the contest, and increased it during the final rounds. Dibiasi would win the Olympic event in both 1972 and 1976, and many would consider him the greatest Olympic platform diver, until American Greg Louganis made his Olympic appearance.

== Dive coaching ==
After graduating Indiana and retiring from competitive diving, he coached for the U.S. Army at West Point, and then for 11 seasons at the University of Arizona from 1973-1984. Young resigned as the Arizona dive coach at the age of 36 for "personal reasons", and was replaced by 1976 Olympic 3-meter springboard bronze medalist Cynthia Potter, who had formerly coached diving at Southern Methodist University. Young coached age group diving at the Tucson Diving Club, around 100 miles Southeast of Phoenix. He led Arizona's Wildcat dive team to their first dive scoring in the NCAA championships. Michele Mitchell, one of his more exceptional divers, swam for Arizona from 1979-1983, and was a two-time Olympic silver medalist. In 1983, Young was named as the Head Diving Coach for the United States Diving Team at the July, 1983 World University Games in Edmonton, Alberta, Canada.

Young died of bladder cancer in 2006 in Tucson, Arizona, at the age of 58, cutting short his coaching career. He was survived by his daughter, Heather Marie Burgoyne. A service was held at Heather Mortuary on Saturday, July 1, 2006 on Columbus Avenue in Tucson. Young made the unique request that he be cremated in an Arizona Diving shirt, and his ashes be placed in a bronze urn, that would ever reside at the Hillenbrand Aquatic Center at the University of Arizona. The urn remains at the 10-meter level of the diving tower by the west pillar. Most of his former divers consider the placement of his ashes a fitting tribute to the man who wanted to watch divers for eternity.
