= Rock 'n' Roll Express =

Professional wrestling tag team

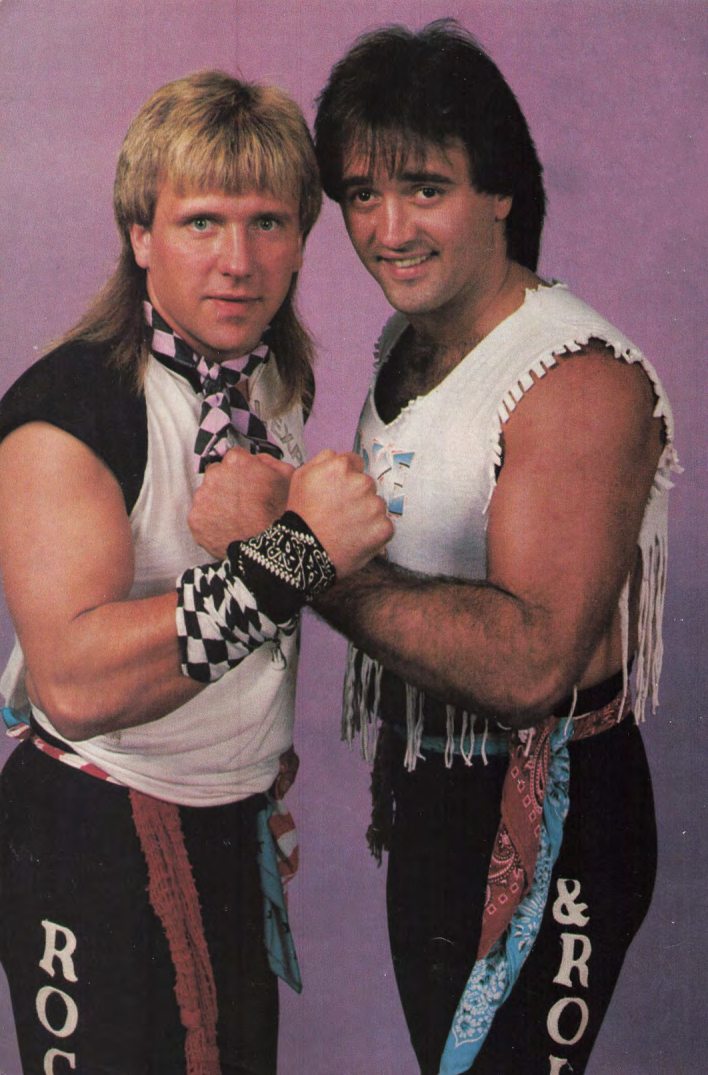
- The Rock 'n' Roll Express, c. 1985; Morton (left) and Gibson (right).

Tag team
- Members: Robert Gibson; Ricky Morton
- Billed from: Memphis, Tennessee; Music City, USA
- Debut: 1980

The Rock 'n' Roll Express is a professional wrestling tag team consisting of professional wrestlers Robert Gibson and Ricky Morton. The duo began teaming together in Memphis in the early 1980s, followed by Mid-South Wrestling (later to be known as the Universal Wrestling Federation), followed by Jim Crockett Promotions (JCP). They held the NWA World Tag Team Championship nine times, with the first four times in JCP. They also feuded with The Four Horsemen. In the late 1980s, they were contenders for the American Wrestling Association's AWA World Tag Team Championship. By 1991, the team was losing momentum, and Morton turned heel on his partner to join The York Foundation in World Championship Wrestling (WCW). In 1992, the team reformed in both the United States Wrestling Association and Smoky Mountain Wrestling, where they held the SMW Tag Team Championship ten times. The duo also worked in the World Wrestling Federation. On March 31, 2017, the Rock 'n' Roll Express was inducted into the WWE Hall of Fame by Jim Cornette.

== History ==
=== Formation and early years (1980-1984) ===
Ricky Morton and Robert Gibson both teamed with each other in 1980 with Robert's brother Ricky in Memphis without the Rock N' Roll Express name.

The Rock 'n' Roll Express name was formed with Ricky Morton and Robert Gibson in March 1983 in Memphis by head booker Jerry Lawler. They were originally paired together as an alternative to the popular team of The Fabulous Ones (Steve Keirn and Stan Lane) when they could not wrestle in certain towns. The gimmick of The Rock 'n' Roll Express was a couple of high flying wrestlers who loved glam metal music, as it was a popular genre of music at the time. In 1983 and 1984, the team participated in a series of matches against The Galaxians, the Bruise Brothers (Porkchop Cash and Troy Graham), and the team of Lanny Poffo and Randy Savage.

They soon made their way to Mid-South Wrestling where they started a feud with the Midnight Express (Bobby Eaton, Dennis Condrey, and manager Jim Cornette). The feud began when Cornette threw a celebration for the Midnight Express after they won the Mid-South Tag Team Championship. During the celebration, The Rock 'n' Roll Express shoved Cornette's face into the celebratory cake. The rivalry between the two teams carried on into the Mid-Atlantic area.

=== Jim Crockett Promotions (1985–1988) ===
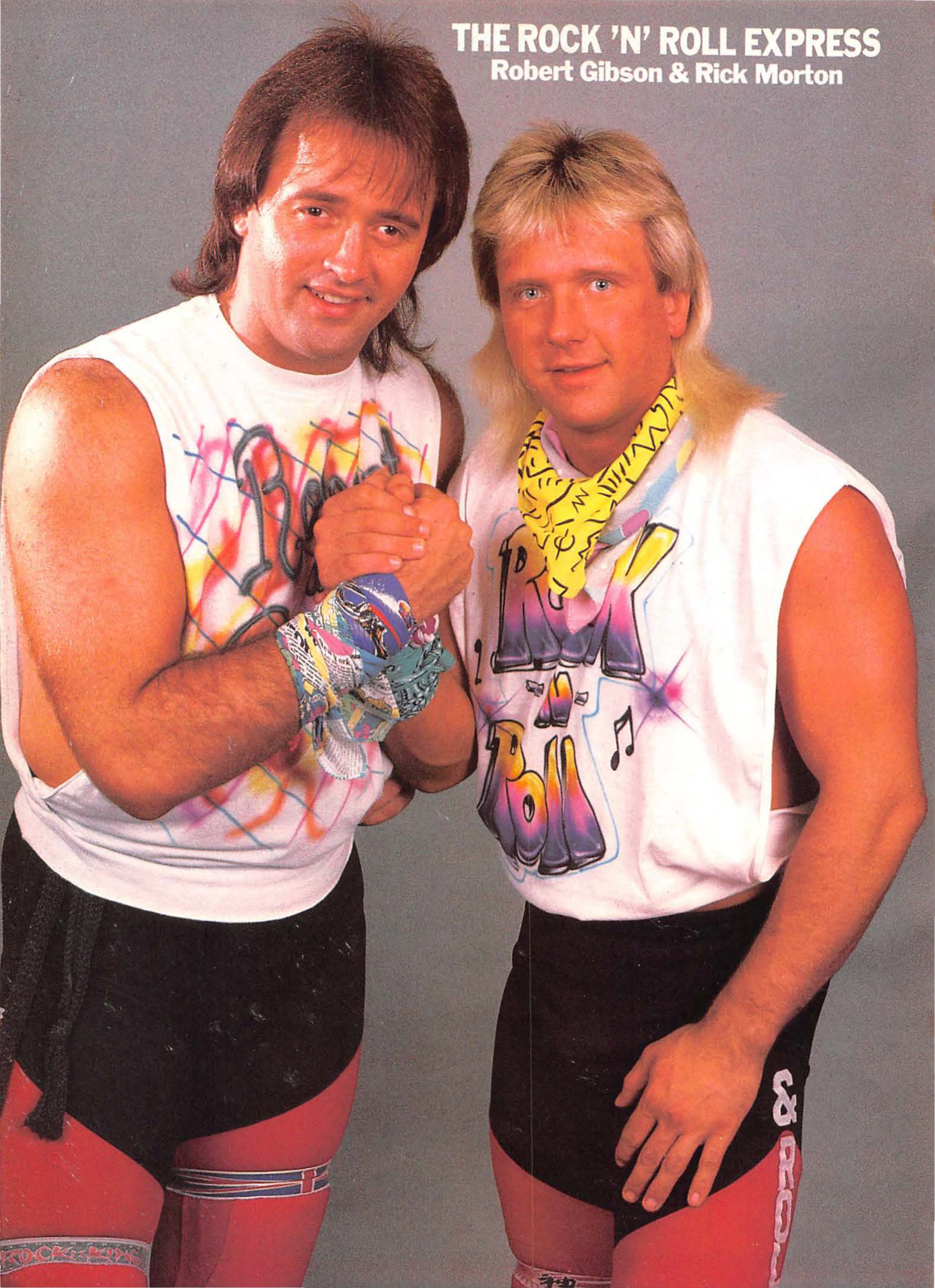
The Rock 'n' Roll Express, circa 1987

The Rock N' Roll Express went to the National Wrestling Alliance (NWA)'s Jim Crockett Promotions (JCP) in 1985 and won four NWA World Tag Team Championships over the next couple of years. On July 9, 1985, the team debuted in JCP against the team of Ivan Koloff and Krusher Khrushchev, whom they defeated to begin their first reign as champions. The reign lasted until October 13 of that same year. At Starrcade in 1985, they recaptured the title, only to lose them on a prime time WTBS special to the Midnight Express, Superstars on the Superstation, on February 7, 1986. This title change is significant because televised matches between major contenders were rarely shown in those days. They won the title back in Philadelphia on August 16, 1986, and held them until a Saturday night prime time match on WTBS' World Championship Wrestling against Rick Rude and the Raging Bull Manny Fernandez. The Rock 'n' Roll Express won the belts back when Rude, still a champion, simply left the NWA to go work for Vince McMahon in the World Wrestling Federation (WWF). Needing to save face, promoter Jim Crockett had Ivan Koloff substitute for an 'injured' Rude, and the Express won the belts for what proved to be the final time.

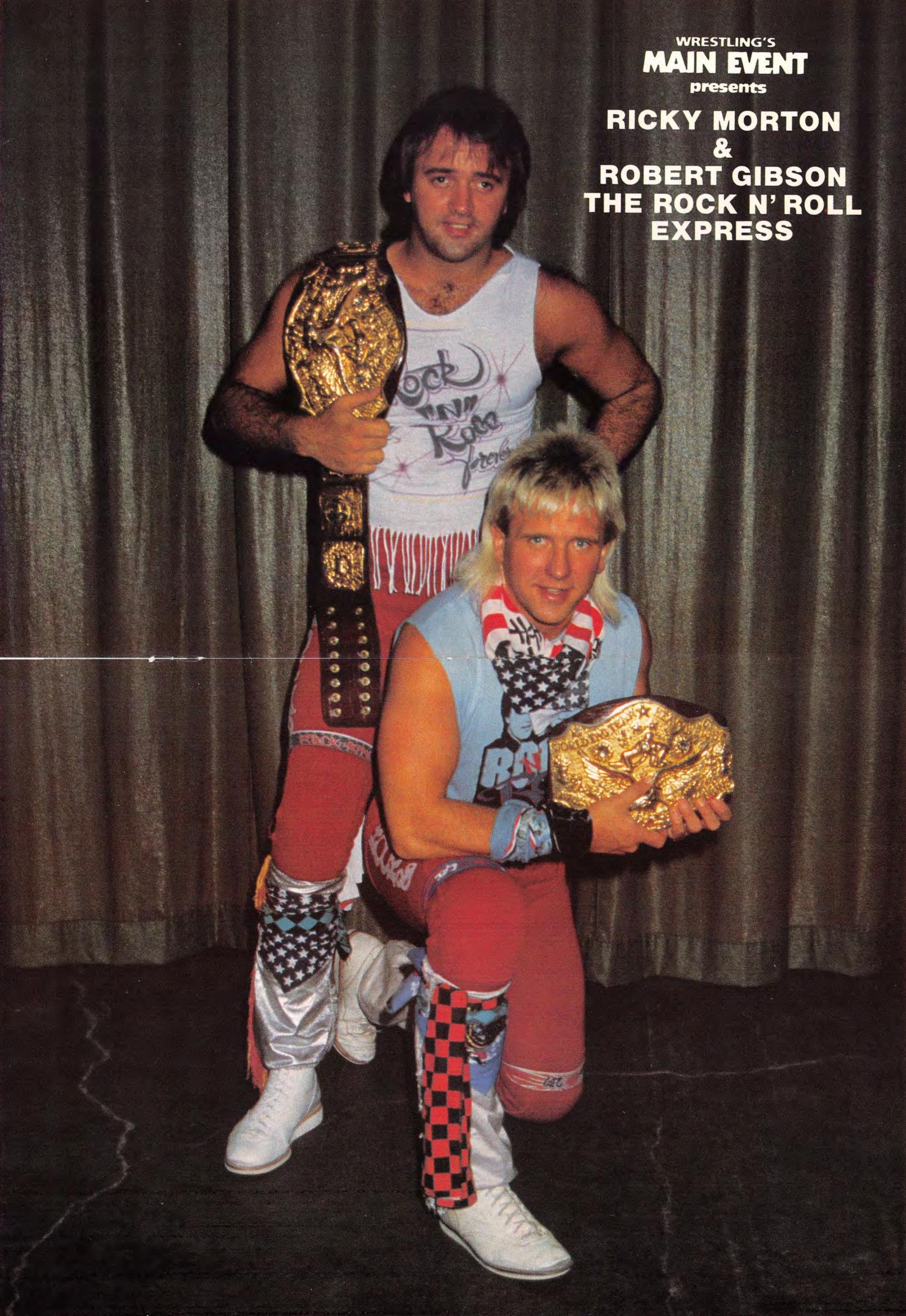
The Rock 'n' Roll Express as NWA World Tag Team Champions, circa 1987

During their time in JCP, the Rock 'n' Roll Express achieved enormous popularity. At times the company would run two shows in one night, with the Rock 'n' Roll Express often headlining the "B" team cards. They would often outdraw the concurrent "A" team shows with bigger-named talent. On one occasion, this led them to receive a jealous reprimand from booker Dusty Rhodes after they sold out Charlotte, while the A team card with Rhodes did less than half the gate in Baltimore. Morton and Gibson were so popular during this time period that they were actually asked to leave Carowinds Amusement Park because they were creating a mob and it was shutting down the park. It was a common occurrence for the fans to swarm them as they did their ring entrance which drew a huge crowd reaction when their music (Electric Light Orchestra's Rock 'n' Roll Is King and later Ricky Morton's Boogie Woogie Dance Hall) began. Fans would also hang out at their houses, and at the height of their popularity, the Charlotte police would station an officer at their homes to keep fans away. Robert Gibson says they went nine months without a day off during this period, and when they repeatedly requested time off, Jim Crockett told them that it would cost them too much money in lost ticket sales. They eventually would fake injuries to get days off.

In November 1986 at Starrcade '86: The Skywalkers, the Rock 'n' Roll Express defeated Ole Anderson and Arn Anderson in a steel cage match to retain the NWA World Tag Team Championship. After a series of matches running from late August through early October, they lost their title for a fourth and final time (They would win four more in later years, but only the first four were also recognized by World Championship Wrestling later) in the fall of 1987 to Arn Anderson and Tully Blanchard thanks to a pre-match attack by their longtime rivals, The Midnight Express. Morton suffered an injured arm in the attack which led to Gibson beginning the match alone. Eventually Morton would join the match in a sling, but the match ended when Gibson told the referee to stop the match due to Morton's injury. They feuded heavily with The Four Horsemen members Ric Flair, Arn Anderson and Tully Blanchard, who constantly mocked them and attacked them outside of the ring.

During late 1987, the Rock 'n' Roll Express feud with the Midnight Express heated up again which led to an historic scaffold match on November 26, 1987, at Starrcade 87 in Chicago. Morton and Gibson defeated Bobby Eaton and Stan Lane eight minutes into the match. As 1988 began, they entered into a brief feud with The Sheepherders. On January 23, 1988, in Cincinnati, Ivan Koloff & the Warlord defeated The Rock 'n' Roll Express in twelve seconds, with Morton and Gibson leaving the company after the match. After a several month absence, Ricky and Robert did an interview with Bob Caudle at Clash of the Champions II where they discussed returning to the NWA. On June 26 at the start of The Great American Bash Tour, Ricky and Robert defeated the Sheepherders in their return match. They won several more matches against the Sheepherders, as well as a few others until a pay dispute led to Robert Gibson departing JCP again in late July. Ricky Morton stayed on and wrestled singles matches, as well as tag team and six man matches with a variety of partners such as Nikita Koloff, Brad Armstrong, and Steve Williams. Morton had his last match on September 23, 1988, before leaving JCP again.

=== AWA and return to the NWA/WCW (1988–1992) ===
In 1988, The Rock 'n' Roll Express went to Memphis and AWA. They had a brief feud with The Midnight Rockers in the Continental Wrestling Association (CWA), over the AWA World Tag Team Championship. Their first match on February 15, 1988, ended in controversy, causing the AWA World Tag Team title to be held up. A week later, on February 22, a rematch for the held-up titles was held and The Midnight Rockers won them back. In all, the Rock 'n' Roll Express spent April to May, and October to December 1988 in the AWA having short runs with Verne Gagne. Robert Gibson stated that they went to the AWA out of respect to Wahoo McDaniel who was wrestling there at the time. On February 2, 1989, in Kansas City they had a match with The British Bulldogs, and they also did a brief tour in Japan for All Japan Pro Wrestling during 1988.

On January 3, 1990, Morton and Gibson made their return to the NWA. During the early part of the return they had TV matches with the Midnight Express, the Horsemen, and The Fabulous Freebirds. On July 7, 1990, they challenged Doom for the NWA World Tag Team Championship at The Great American Bash in the semi-main event, but lost. On September 22, 1990, in a match against Doom at a house show in Jacksonville, Florida, Robert Gibson suffered a torn ACL when Butch Reed came off the top rope on his extended knee while Ron Simmons was holding it. Morton would state years later on a podcast with Ric Flair that the injury actually occurred the day before the match when Robert's wife hit him with a car. Ricky says that he told Robert to just get to the ring and go down right after the start of the match so that he could be paid while injured. Gibson was forced to miss a considerable amount of time throughout the rest of 1990 and the first half of 1991 while recovering from surgery which was performed by Dr. James Andrews. On June 12, 1991, at Clash of the Champions XV in Knoxville, Tennessee, Morton turned on a returning Gibson to join the York Foundation, which led to a match between Morton and Gibson at The Great American Bash on July 14, 1991. Richard Morton (managed by Alexandra York) pinned Robert Gibson at 17:23 after Morton came off the top and hit Gibson in the back with a computer as York distracted referee Bill Alfonso on the apron. The former partners had more matches over the next several weeks, mostly won by Morton. Morton and Gibson continued their singles careers until Robert was released by WCW in November 1991. Morton stayed on in WCW as a heel until the summer of 1992.

=== SMW, USWA, WCW, and WWF (1992–1996) ===
In late July 1992, Ricky Morton briefly feuded with Eddie Gilbert in the United States Wrestling Association (USWA), and before his brief USWA run ended, Gibson joined him for a few tag team matches. They reunited on August 8, 1992, in Smoky Mountain Wrestling (SMW) and feuded with The Heavenly Bodies, winning the tag team title ten times. The feud with the Heavenly Bodies, which had been ongoing for approximately a year, included a barbed wire cage match and a Texas death match. The rivalry carried over to both World Championship Wrestling and the World Wrestling Federation (WWF) in 1993, splitting pay per view matches for the two promotions. The Rock 'n' Roll Express defeated the Heavenly Bodies (Stan Lane and Dr. Tom Prichard) at WCW's SuperBrawl III event and the Bodies (this time Prichard and Jimmy Del Ray) defeating the Express for the SMW Tag Team Championship at the Survivor Series. Defending the SMW tag title at the event was part of an agreement between the WWF's Vince McMahon and SMW's Jim Cornette.

Back in SMW in May 1994, The Rock 'n' Roll Express lost their title to the team of Chris Candido and Brian Lee, who were managed by Tammy Fytch. The duo, however, won the title back in August. After that feud ended, they feuded with The Gangstas over the titles. During that feud, they had Jim Cornette as their manager. Soon after the Gangstas feuded, Cornette betrayed Morton and Gibson, as they feuded with The Dynamic Duo, whom they lost the titles to in April 1995.

In April 1995, they defeated Dick Murdoch and Randy Rhodes to win the vacant NWA World Tag Team Championship. In June 1995, they were stripped of the titles, as their USWA match with PG-13 ended in controversy. A week later, they defeated PG-13 to win back the NWA World Tag Team titles and win the USWA World Tag Team Championship, making them double champions, but it didn't last, as they lost the USWA titles back to PG-13 a week later. In July 1995, they scheduled to feud with The Thugs over the SMW Tag Team Championship, and set to turn heel, but in August 1995, Morton was suspended after an altercation between his girlfriend Andrea Callaway and Tracy Smothers' girlfriend Angela Lambert, leaving Gibson on his own. As a result of Morton's suspension, they vacated the NWA World Tag Team titles. When Morton returned to SMW, Gibson had turned heel and joined Jim Cornette's Militia, but the proposed feud between the two didn't materialize as the promotion folded shortly after his return.

After SMW's closure, they reunited in the USWA and resumed their feud with PG-13.

=== Return to WCW (1996–1997) ===
On June 3, 1996, Morton and Gibson made their return to World Championship Wrestling on Monday Nitro, facing and losing to Ric Flair and Arn Anderson, and preliminarily reigniting an old WCW rivalry. They made their second appearance on Monday Nitro, August 5, 1996, losing to WCW World Tag-Team Champions Harlem Heat. Their third appearance came three weeks later, where they faced Ric Flair and Arn Anderson again on Nitro in Lakeland, Florida. They lost to Flair and Anderson, but three days later in Orlando, Florida at a WCW Worldwide taping, the Rock 'n' Roll Express gained their first victory in their comeback, defeating High Voltage. Their next appearance came on WCW Saturday Night on September 30, where they fell to The Faces of Fear (Meng and The Barbarian). Morton and Gibson appeared sparingly going forward on Saturday Night and WCW Pro. They left in 1997 to participate in independent federations.

=== World Wrestling Federation (1998) ===
A year later, they were in the WWF for a brief stint as part of the NWA angle (managed by former rival James E. Cornette). They then used The Rockers' old theme music. Their first appearance came on Monday Night RAW when they faced Skull and 8-Ball on January 12, 1998, in State College, Pennsylvania, and lost via disqualification. During their time in the company, they appeared at WrestleMania XIV in March 1998 in a tag team battle royal, which was won by the Legion of Doom 2000. They also had feuds with L.O.D. 2000 and The New Midnight Express having an NWA Tag Team Title match at the WWF Pay Per View Unforgiven against them.

=== Independent Circuit (1998–present) ===
After WWF in May 1998 they worked for the independent circuit. They went to work for Ohio Valley Wrestling and Power Pro Wrestling until 1999.

As of 2023, they still team together.

=== Total Nonstop Action Wrestling (2003, 2016) ===
In early 2003, Morton and Gibson appeared in TNA as part of Vince Russo's Sports Entertainment Xtreme (SEX) faction. The duo feuded with America's Most Wanted, Chris Harris and James Storm. In late 2003 and early 2004, they worked for the All World Wrestling League, owned by Eddie and Thomas Farhat, the sons of the "Original Sheik" Ed Farhat. The duo returned to TNA for the special Total Nonstop Deletion, participating in the Tag Team Apocalypto open invitational for The Broken Hardys' TNA World Tag Team Championship.

=== AWWL (2005) ===
Starting in 2005, they would team up again, often wrestling against the Midnight Express in the Mid-Atlantic area. On June 7, 2008, they defeated The Midnight Express (Dennis Condrey and Bobby Eaton) at the NWA 60th Anniversary Show in Atlanta.

=== PWA (2009) ===
In 2009, the Rock 'n' Roll Express joined Booker T's Pro Wrestling Alliance in Houston, Texas and became PWA Tag Team Champions.

=== WWE Hall of Fame (2017) ===
On February 6, 2017, the WWE announced it would be honoring the Rock 'n' Roll Express by inducting the team into the WWE Hall of Fame at the 2017 WWE Hall of Fame Induction Ceremony on March 31, 2017. On March 20, WWE officially announced that the team will be inducted by Jim Cornette. They recently captured the Viral Pro Wrestling Tag Team Championships at VPW's Holiday Havoc on December 9, 2017.

=== National Wrestling Alliance (2019–present) ===
On April 5, 2019, the NWA announced that the Rock 'n' Roll Express would compete in the Crockett Cup (2019) on April 27, 2019, in Concord, North Carolina. They were defeated by The Briscoe Brothers (Jay Briscoe and Mark Briscoe) in the first round. On October 1, 2019, during the second day of NWA Power television tapings, The Rock 'n' Roll Express defeated The Wildcards (Thomas Latimer & Royce Isaacs) to win the NWA World Tag Team Championship for the fifth time.

=== New Japan Pro-Wrestling (2019–2020) ===
On September 28, 2019, the Rock 'n' Roll Express made their New Japan Pro-Wrestling (NJPW) debut at Fighting Spirit Unleashed (2019) in New York City. They teamed with Hiroshi Tanahashi and defeated Los Ingobernables de Japón (Bushi, Shingo Takagi, and Tetsuya Naito), it was also referee Tiger Hattori's final match in the United States. On September 29, at Fighting Spirit Unleashed in Philadelphia, they teamed with Tanahashi and Chaos (Hirooki Goto, Tomohiro Ishii, and Yoshi-Hashi) in a twelve-man tag team elimination match versus Bullet Club (Jay White, Kenta, Tama Tonga, Tanga Loa, Chase Owens, and Gedo).

=== All Elite Wrestling (2019–present) ===
The Rock 'n' Roll Express made their All Elite Wrestling (AEW) appearance on the October 30, 2019 episode of Dynamite to crown the inaugural AEW World Tag Team Champions, but were ambushed by Proud n Powerful (Santana and Ortiz). At AEW Full Gear, the two participated in the aftermath of the opening tag team match between The Young Bucks and Proud n Powerful, where Morton executed a Canadian Destroyer on Santana followed up by a suicide dive onto Sammy Guevara and Ortiz.

On the August 12 episode of Dynamite, the Rock 'n' Roll Express were involved in a segment with FTR and Arn Anderson and Tully Blanchard to celebrate Tag Team Appreciation Night. However, after a scuffle between Tully Blanchard and Ricky Morton, FTR would attack The Rock 'n' Roll Express.

On the January 4, 2025 episode of AEW Collision, the Rock 'n' Roll Express made an appearance where they were ultimately kidnapped by Jon Moxley and the Death Riders. On the January 22, 2025 episode of Dynamite, the Rock 'n' Roll Express would again be kidnapped and attacked by Moxley and the Death Riders.

On the April 23, 2025 episode of Dynamite, the Rock 'n' Roll Express would be involved in a new angle which saw them getting attacked by FTR.

== The New Rock 'n' Roll Express ==
Over the years, when Morton and Gibson were not teaming with each other, they each had different tag team partners, calling themselves "The New Rock 'n' Roll Express." Ricky Morton teamed with Ricky Fuji while in Japan for FMW, and with Brad Armstrong, Kid Kash, or his cousin Todd in the independent circuit in the U.S., while Robert Gibson teamed with Marty Jannetty in IWA Japan as "The Rock 'n' Rockers", which played off both the Rock 'n' Roll Express and Jannetty's famous tag team with Shawn Michaels, The Rockers. He also teamed with Bob Holly in 1992. Ricky Morton also teamed on occasion with Jack Ward ("JT Walker"), a professional wrestler billed from Paintsville, Kentucky.

== Championships and accomplishments ==
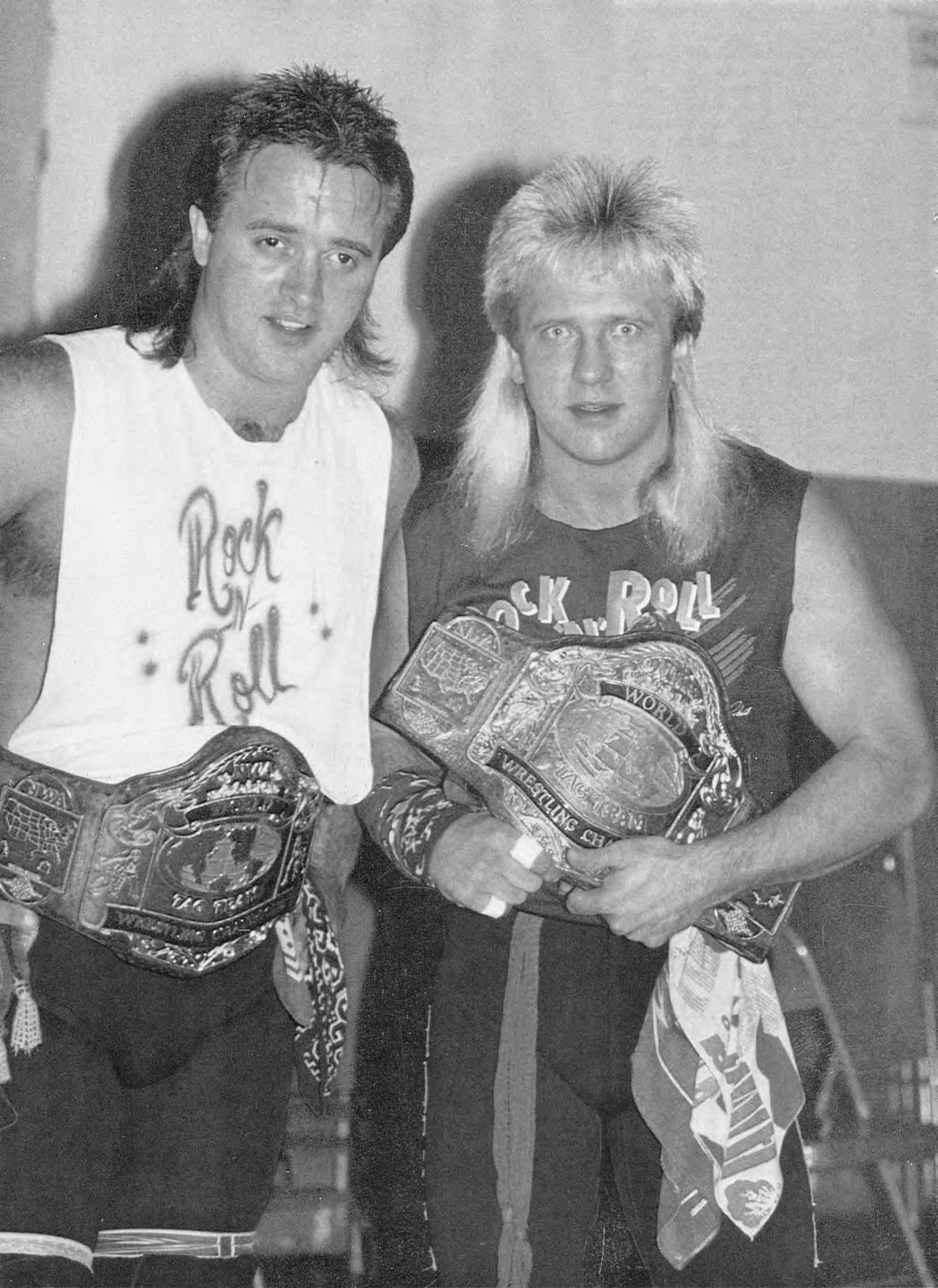
The Rock 'n' Roll Express held the NWA World Tag Team Championship (Mid-Atlantic version) four times

- Appalachian Mountain Wrestling
  - AMW Tag Team Championship (1 time)
- Cauliflower Alley Club
  - Tag Team Award (2022)
- Continental Wrestling Association / Championship Wrestling Association
  - AWA Southern Tag Team Championship (2 times)
  - CWA Tag Team Championship (1 time)
  - CWA World Tag Team Championship (1 time)
- Jim Crockett Promotions
  - NWA World Tag Team Championship (Mid-Atlantic version) (4 times)
- Korean Pro-Wrestling Association
  - NWA World Tag Team Championship (1 time)
- Mid-South Wrestling Association
  - Mid-South Tag Team Championship (3 times)
- National Wrestling Alliance
  - NWA World Tag Team Championship (2 times)
  - NWA Hall of Fame (Class of 2006)
- NWA Mid Atlantic Championship Wrestling
  - MACW Tag Team Championship (3 times)
- NWA Southwest
  - NWA World Tag Team Championship (1 time)
- NWA Wildside
  - NWA Wildside Tag Team Championship (1 time)
- Memphis Wrestling Hall of Fame
  - Class of 2024
- Mid-South Wrestling Association
  - MSWA Southern Tag Team Championship (1 time)
- Pro Wrestling Alliance
  - PWA Tag Team Championship (1 time)
- Pro Wrestling Elite
  - PWE Tag Team Championship
- Pro Wrestling Illustrated
  - PWI Tag Team of the Year award in 1986
  - PWI ranked them # 4 of the best 100 tag teams during the "PWI Years" in 2003.
- Professional Wrestling Hall of Fame and Museum
  - Class of 2021
- Rocket City Championship Wrestling
  - Southern Tag Team Championship (1 time)
- Smoky Mountain Wrestling
  - SMW Tag Team Championship (10 times)
- Traditional Championship Wrestling
  - TCW Tag Team Championship (1 time)
- Ultimate Championship Wrestling
  - UCW Tag Team Championship (1 time)
- United States Wrestling Association
  - NWA World Tag Team Championship (1 time)
  - USWA World Tag Team Championship (2 times)
- UPW Pro Wrestling
  - UPW Tag Team Championship (1 time, current)
- Viral Pro Wrestling
  - VPW Tag Team Championship (1 time)
- World Organization of Wrestling
  - WOW Tag Team Championship (1 time)
- Wrestling Observer Newsletter
  - Wrestling Observer Newsletter Hall of Fame (Class of 2014)
- WWE
  - WWE Hall of Fame (Class of 2017)

^{1}During this win, the title was awarded to them and the records are unclear as to where this occurred and which promotion they wrestled for at the time.

== Luchas de Apuestas record ==
Winner (wager)	Loser (wager)	Location	Event	Date	Notes
The Rock 'n' Roll Express (hairs)	The Bruise Brothers (titles)	Morristown, Tennessee	SMW House Show	September 11, 1993	
Chris Candido and Brian Lee (Tammy Sytch's hair)	The Rock 'n' Roll Express (Ricky Morton's hair)	Johnson City, Tennessee	SMW Fire On The Mountain 1994	August 6, 1994	
