= Sonny Fargo =

American professional wrestler and referee (1928-2008)

Personal information
- Born: Jack Lewis Faggart; July 20, 1928 Rowan County, North Carolina, U.S.
- Died: August 20, 2008 (aged 80) China Grove, North Carolina, U.S.
- Spouse: Delores Tutherow Faggart
- Children: 2
- Family: Jackie Fargo (brother)

Professional wrestling career
- Ring name(s): The Assassins' Valet; The Masked Rebel; Roughhouse Fargo; Sonny Fargo
- Billed height: 6 ft 0 in (183 cm)
- Billed weight: 238 lb (108 kg)
- Trained by: Joe Marshall; Kenny Marshall
- Debut: 1950
- Retired: 1984

Jack Lewis Faggart (July 20, 1928 – August 20, 2008) was an American professional wrestler and professional wrestling referee, better known by the ring name Sonny "Roughhouse" Fargo. He is best known for his appearances with NWA Mid-America in the 1960s and 1970s.

== Early life ==
Faggart was born on July 20, 1928, in Rowan County, North Carolina, to Lewis and Delma Swink Faggart. He had two siblings: a brother, Henry (who himself became a wrestler under the ring name Jackie Fargo), and a sister, Kathleen.

== Professional wrestling career ==
Faggart was trained by Joe Marshall and Kenny Marshall, debuting in 1950. He wrestled primarily in the Carolinas, Tennessee, and the Gulf Coast. By the late-1950s, he was regularly teaming with his brother Jackie Fargo and with their kayfabe brother Don Fargo as "The Fabulous Fargos" in the Tennessee-based NWA Mid-America promotion. In 1960, Sonny and Jackie made several appearances in Madison Square Garden in New York City, New York. In 1962, Fargo briefly held the East Coast Heavyweight Championship in the Massachusetts-based Santos Wrestling Enterprises promotion.

In 1963, Fargo was brought into Championship Wrestling from Florida as "the Assassins' Valet", the silent masked henchman of the villainous tag team The Assassins. When The Assassins were being overwhelmed during matches, Fargo would revive them with an oxygen mask at ringside. On one occasion, Fargo legitimately stunned Eddie Graham by accidentally hitting him too hard with the oxygen tank.

In early 1964, Fargo began wrestling under a mask as "the Masked Rebel". In March 1964, he and Jackie Fargo briefly held the NWA Southern Tag Team Championship (Mid-America version). He unmasked the following month.

From 1964 to 1966, Fargo began regularly appearing with the Charlotte, North Carolina–based Jim Crockett Promotions, where his regular opponents included Joe Tomasso. He made occasional further in-ring appearances with Jim Crockett Promotions throughout the late-1960s and early-1970s, but by the mid-1960s had largely transitioned to being a referee for the promotion.

After being absent from NWA Mid-America for several years, from 1968 Fargo began sporadically reappearing under a new persona, taking time off from his refereeing job to wrestle for short stints in Tennessee. Nicknamed "Roughhouse" Fargo, he was portrayed as the mentally unstable brother of Jackie Fargo, with the storyline being that Jackie Fargo would check him out of a psychiatric hospital and bring him to the territory when he needed help dealing with heels. The brothers' rivals included The Bounty Hunters, The Garvin Brothers (Ronnie Garvin and Terry Garvin), The Interns, The Von Brauners, and The Bicenntenial Kings (Dennis Condrey and Phil Hickerson). To make his character seem legitimate, Fargo engaged in antics such as eating fans' popcorn, giving nonsensical promos, and attacking his opponents with unlikely weapons such as ice cream cones and ketchup bottles. From 1972 to 1974, Fargo held the NWA Southern Tag Team Championship (Mid-America version) four more times. As Roughhouse Fargo, he was a major draw in the Memphis area.

Following the closure of NWA Mid-America in the late-1970s, Fargo made a handful of appearances with the Continental Wrestling Association. He retired from professional wrestling in 1984. He continued to work as a referee for Jim Crockett Promotions into the 1980s, officiating at major events such as Starrcade 1983, Starrcade 1984, Starrcade 1985, and Starrcade '86: The Skywalkers.

Fargo was posthumously inducted into the NWA Wrestling Legends Hall of Heroes in 2009 alongside Jackie and Don Fargo.

== Professional wrestling style and persona ==
As "Roughhouse" Fargo, Fargo portrayed a wild, unhinged wrestler who had been committed to Broughton Hospital, a psychiatric hospital in Morganton, North Carolina. His finishing moves were the atomic drop and the forearm smash.

== Personal life and death ==
Faggart was married to Delores Tutherow Faggart, who predeceased him in 1999. He had two children: a son, Obie, and a daughter, Debbie. He was the brother of fellow professional wrestler and tag partner Henry "Jackie Fargo" Faggart.

Late in life, Faggart suffered from diabetes, leading to him becoming a double amputee. He died on August 20, 2008.

== Championships and accomplishments ==
- Big Time Wrestling
  - BTW East Coast Heavyweight Championship (1 time)
  - BTW World Tag Team Championship (1 time) - with Jackie Fargo
- NWA Mid-America
  - NWA Southern Tag Team Championship (Mid-America version) (5 times) - with Jackie Fargo (3 times), Rufus R. Jones (1 time), and Tojo Yamamoto (1 time)
- NWA Wrestling Legends Hall of Heroes
  - Inductee (class of 2009)
