= Włodzimierz Mejsak =

Polish diver

Personal information
- Nationality: Polish
- Born: 7 March 1945 (age 80); Warsaw, Poland

Sport
- Sport: Diving

Włodzimierz Mejsak (born 7 March 1945) is a Polish diver. He competed in the men's 10 metre platform event at the 1968 Summer Olympics.
