= Robin Baskerville =

British diver

Personal information
- Nationality: British
- Born: 6 April 1950 (age 75) St Albans, England

Sport
- Sport: Diving

Robin Baskerville (born 6 April 1950) is a British diver. He competed in the men's 10 metre platform event at the 1968 Summer Olympics.
