= Bob Eaton (diver) =

Canadian diver (born 1952)

Personal information
- Born: 21 April 1952 (age 73); Toronto, Ontario, Canada

Sport
- Sport: Diving

Bob Eaton (born 21 April 1952) is a Canadian diver. He competed in the men's 10 metre platform event at the 1968 Summer Olympics.
