= Karl-Heinz Schwemmer =

German diver

Personal information
- Nationality: German
- Born: 14 June 1943 (age 81); Athens, Greece

Sport
- Sport: Diving

Karl-Heinz Schwemmer (born 14 June 1943) is a German diver. He competed at the 1968 Summer Olympics and the 1972 Summer Olympics.
