= Jakub Puchow =

Polish diver

Personal information
- Nationality: Polish
- Born: 13 November 1947 (age 78) Warsaw, Poland

Sport
- Sport: Diving
Medal record
Men's diving
Representing Poland
Summer Universiade
Bronze medal – third place	1970 Turin	10 m platform

Jakub Puchow (born 13 November 1947) is a Polish diver. He competed at the 1968 Summer Olympics and the 1972 Summer Olympics.
