= Waguih Aboul Seoud =

Egyptian diver

Personal information
- Nationality: Egyptian
- Born: 8 February 1946; Cairo, Egypt
- Died: 12 January 2013 (aged 66)

Sport
- Sport: Diving

Waguih Rauf Aboul Seoud (8 February 1946 – 12 January 2013) was an Egyptian diver. He competed in the 1968 Summer Olympics.
