= Bernd Wucherpfennig =

German diver

Personal information
- Nationality: German
- Born: 22 December 1940 (age 84); Berlin, Germany

Sport
- Sport: Diving

Bernd Wucherpfennig (born 22 December 1940) is a German diver. He competed at the 1968 Summer Olympics and the 1972 Summer Olympics.
