= Starrcade '83: A Flare for the Gold =

1983 Jim Crockett Promotions closed-circuit television event

- Official poster used to advertise the event locally, featuring Ric Flair, Harley Race, Ricky Steamboat, and Roddy Piper
- Promotion(s): National Wrestling Alliance; Jim Crockett Promotions
- Date: November 24, 1983
- City: Greensboro, North Carolina
- Venue: Greensboro Coliseum Complex
- Attendance: 15,447
- Tagline: A Flare for the Gold!

Starrcade chronology
← Previous; First	Next → 1984

Starrcade '83: A Flare for the Gold was the first annual Starrcade professional wrestling event, produced under the National Wrestling Alliance (NWA) banner by Jim Crockett Promotions (JCP). The event took place on November 24, 1983, at the Greensboro Coliseum Complex in Greensboro, North Carolina, and was broadcast on closed-circuit television around the Southern United States. (Note: In 2014, the WWE Network included the previous Starrcades (1983–1986), which had been transmitted via closed-circuit television, alongside the rest of the Starrcades in the pay-per-view section.)

Eight matches were contested at the event. In the main event, Ric Flair defeated Harley Race in a Steel Cage match to win the NWA World Heavyweight Championship. In other prominent matches, Jay Youngblood and Ricky Steamboat defeated The Brisco Brothers (Jack Brisco and Jerry Brisco) to win the NWA World Tag Team Championship and Roddy Piper defeated Greg Valentine in a Dog Collar match.

== Background ==
Harley Race, in his seventh reign as the NWA World Heavyweight Champion

Starrcade was headlined by the feud between Ric Flair and Harley Race over the NWA World Heavyweight Championship. In 1981, Flair won the title from Dusty Rhodes on September 17 in Kansas City, Kansas, where Rhodes and Flair were not major names. Flair felt that the match was poorly received due to the location, a choice he blamed on Rhodes, who was unhappy about losing the title. Initially, Flair was not well accepted as champion by promoters and fans in some territories. On June 10, 1983, Race defeated Flair, beginning his seventh title reign. The NWA chose Race in order to make Flair the long-term champ at Starrcade '83; Race reluctantly agreed.

Their feud portrayed Flair as the protagonist and Race as the antagonist afraid to lose the title, employing unethical tactics to remain champion. In storyline, Race offered a $25,000 bounty to have Flair put out of professional wrestling. On August 31, Bob Orton Jr. and Dick Slater attacked Flair by performing an aided piledriver. Flair was portrayed as suffering a serious neck injury, and they collected the bounty. Flair announced his retirement, but returned on September 21 by attacking Orton and Slater with a baseball bat. Their feud culminated at Starrcade. It later transpired the WWF's Vince McMahon offered to pay Race $250,000 to walk out on the NWA and join the WWF, in an attempted sabotage; Race rejected the offer.

The match between the team of Jack and Jerry Brisco and the team of Ricky Steamboat and Jay Youngblood stemmed from their months-long feud. In storyline, they were originally friends until the Briscos turned on Steamboat and Youngblood. The Briscos won the NWA World Tag Team Championship from Steamboat and Youngblood on June 18. The match between the team of Bob Orton Jr. and Dick Slater and the team of Mark Youngblood and Wahoo McDaniel was made for Youngblood and McDaniel to avenge Orton and Slater's attack on their friend Flair. The match between Greg Valentine and Roddy Piper was made to conclude their feud, which stemmed from a match on April 30 in which Valentine used the ring bell to attack Piper's left ear. Piper lost the NWA United States Heavyweight Championship, and 75 percent of the hearing in the ear.

Charlie Brown faced The Great Kabuki in a Title vs. Mask match at Starrcade. In August, Jimmy Valiant was forced to leave JCP after losing a Loser Leaves Town match to Kabuki. Valiant returned under the name Charlie Brown and wore a mask to hide his identity. Kabuki claimed that Brown was Valiant, and got the opportunity to expose Valiant in a Title vs. Mask match. In the match, Kabuki defended his NWA Television Championship, and Brown defended his mask. If Brown was revealed to be Valiant, he would be suspended by the NWA for a year. The match between Carlos Colon and Abdullah the Butcher continued their years-long feud in the World Wrestling Council. Other matches were not a result of a storyline.

== Event ==
Other on-screen personnel
Role:	Name:
Commentator	Bob Caudle
Commentator	Gordon Solie
Interviewer	Barbara Clary
Interviewer	Tony Schiavone
Referee	Sonny Fargo
Referee	Stu Schwartz
Referee	Tommy Young
Referee	Angelo Mosca (Steamboat/Youngblood vs. Briscos)
Referee	Gene Kiniski (Flair vs. Race)
Ring announcer	Tom Miller

The first match was a tag team match between the Assassins (#1 and #2) and the team of Rufus R. Jones and Bugsy McGraw. The match started with McGraw and Jones in control over the Assassins until #1 performed an eye rake on Jones. After repeated attacks by #2, Jones fought back with a headbutt. McGraw tagged in and attacked both of the Assassins. As McGraw slammed #2, #1 rolled up McGraw from behind and pinned him to win the match.

The second match was a tag team match between the team of Johnny Weaver and Scott McGhee, and the team of Kevin Sullivan and Mark Lewin (accompanied by Gary Hart). The match started back and forth until Sullivan and Lewin gained the advantage over McGhee by targeting his left arm. McGhee and Weaver fought back when Weaver performed a bulldog on Sullivan, sending his face into the canvas. Weaver attempted another bulldog, but Sullivan pushed him into the corner. Lewin performed a knee drop from the top turnbuckle on Weaver's left arm as Hart and Sullivan held onto him. Lewin then pinned Weaver to win the match. After the match, Lewin and Sullivan beat down McGhee and lacerated his forehead with a foreign object provided by Hart. Angelo Mosca attempted to help McGhee, but was also attacked.

The third match was between Carlos Colon and Abdullah the Butcher. The match started with Abdullah dominating Colon with the use of a weapon. Colon fought back with punches and used Abdullah's weapon on him. Abdullah knocked down the referee, and Colon applied a figure four leglock on Abdullah. While the referee was still knocked out, Hugo Savinovich entered the ring and hit Colon with a foreign object, allowing Abdullah to pin Colon and win the match.

The fourth match was a tag team match between the team of Wahoo McDaniel and Mark Youngblood, and the team of Dick Slater and Bob Orton Jr. Youngblood had the early advantage over Slater until Slater sent him down with a Russian legsweep. Slater and Orton then took control of the match until Slater accidentally hit Orton. Youngblood performed dropkicks to Slater and Orton, but the pair then double-teamed him. They placed Youngblood on the top turnbuckle, and Orton performed a superplex, sending Youngblood back-first onto the canvas. Orton then pinned Youngblood to win the match. After the match, Slater and Orton beat down McDaniel and attacked his left arm with a knee drop from the top turnbuckle.

The fifth match was a Title vs. Mask match between Charlie Brown and The Great Kabuki (accompanied by Gary Hart). Kabuki's NWA Television Championship was defended in the first fifteen minutes, and Brown's mask was defended for the entire match. The match started with Brown having the advantage with the use of the ringpost and a steel chair. Brown applied a chokehold, but Kabuki fought back and applied a clawhold, squeezing Brown's skull. This continued until Kabuki missed a kick in the corner, and Brown pinned him after an elbow drop to his chest to win the match and the title.

The sixth match was a Dog Collar match between Roddy Piper and Greg Valentine. The match started back and forth, with Valentine targeting Piper's injured left ear. Piper gained the advantage with the use of the chain. Valentine fought back and choked Piper with the chain. Valentine targeted Piper's left ear, causing him to have trouble standing. The match went back and forth until Valentine performed an elbow strike from the turnbuckles and an elbow drop. Valentine climbed the turnbuckles again, but Piper pulled him down. After delivering punches with the chain, Piper pinned Valentine with the chain wrapped around his legs. After the match, Valentine attacked Piper and again choked him with the chain.

The seventh match was a tag team match between the team of Jay Youngblood and Ricky Steamboat, and the team of Jack and Jerry Brisco for the NWA World Tag Team Championship. Angelo Mosca was the special guest referee. The match started back and forth until Jack performed a double underhook suplex to Steamboat, slamming him onto his back. The Briscos had the advantage until Jerry complained to and shoved Mosca after almost pinning Youngblood. Mosca shoved Jerry down, and Youngblood and Steamboat gained the advantage. They performed an aided splash, where Steamboat dropped Youngblood onto the fallen Jerry, and Youngblood pinned him to win the match and the title. After the match, the Briscos attacked Youngblood, Steamboat and Mosca until they fought back.

Ric Flair, after winning the NWA World Heavyweight Championship for the second time

The main event was a steel cage match between Ric Flair and Harley Race for the NWA World Heavyweight Championship, with former NWA World Champion Gene Kiniski as the special referee (another former NWA World Champion, Pat O'Connor, was originally set to be the special referee, but it was discovered that O'Connor (along with Race, Bob Geigel, and Verne Gagne) owned the Central States territory so the change was made (kayfabe) to avoid a conflict of interest). The match began with Flair having the advantage with a headlock. Race fought back by targeting Flair's head and neck. Race, using a piledriver maneuver, dropped Flair head first into the canvas and then sent his head into the cage. Flair fought back after sending Race into the corner of the ring. Flair performed a piledriver and sent Race's head into the cage. After slamming Race down with a belly to back suplex, Flair applied a figure four leglock. Race broke the hold by rolling into the ropes and fought back with a headbutt from the top turnbuckle. As Race applied a headlock, Flair sent Race's head into Kiniski's head. Flair then performed a body press from the top turnbuckle and pinned Race to win the match and the title.

== Aftermath ==
Harley Race had been wrestling for over twenty years and was physically and emotionally exhausted. He took time off from professional wrestling, and his loss at Starrcade is seen as the torch-passing to Ric Flair. Flair's win at Starrcade was significant as it made Flair as a reputable champion. During an international tour in early 1984, without the approval of the NWA board of directors, Flair lost the NWA World Heavyweight Championship to Race on March 21 in Wellington, New Zealand, and won it back two days later in Kallang, Singapore. This was done to increase attendance of the events, and the title changes were not recognized by the NWA until years later. Race did not win the title again. On May 6, Kerry Von Erich won the title from Flair as a tribute to Kerry's brother David, who died in February. Flair won the title back eighteen days later. At the end of Starrcade, Dusty Rhodes made a challenge to Flair for the title, and this led to their title match at the following year's Starrcade.

The feud between Carlos Colon and Abdullah the Butcher continued for over a decade while other feuds ended with their match at Starrcade. Rick Steamboat retired from wrestling after winning the NWA World Tag Team title to focus on his new gym, but then unretired in mid-1984 to feud with Wahoo McDaniel (who turned heel during 1984 claiming he was unappreciated and taken advantage of because he was Native American) and Tully Blanchard over the United States heavyweight title. Steamboat's partner, Jay Youngblood teamed with his brother Mark in JCP and in Florida before Jay's death in 1985.

Several others (Roddy Piper, Greg Valentine, and Bob Orton, Jr.) went to the World Wrestling Federation as part of its 1984 national expansion (all as heels, forgetting their previous feud), and the Briscos went there as well after selling their shares of Georgia Championship Wrestling to Vince McMahon, resulting in Black Saturday.

Angelo Mosca remained in JCP, while his son, Angelo Mosca, Jr., was given a push, with three reigns as Mid-Atlantic Champion before father and son left JCP after control of Maple Leaf Wrestling went to the WWF and became a commentator on the WWF's weekly Maple Leaf Wrestling program.

Jimmy Valiant returned to JCP after his 90-day "Loser Leaves Town" period lapsed and the NWA Television Title was vacated, Mark Youngblood won a tournament final for the vacant title before losing it to JCP newcomer Tully Blanchard, while Valiant ended his feud with Gary Hart and began his years-long feud with Paul Jones, losing his trademark beard to the Assassins, but Valiant would get revenge by unmasking Assassin #2 (revealed to be Hercules Hernandez) and Hernandez left JCP for Mid-South Wrestling. Hart stayed around for a short time, replacing the Great Kabuki (who went to Japan) with Ivan Koloff and "Big Cat" Ernie Ladd, then went back to World Class Championship Wrestling, while Kevin Sullivan and Mark Lewin returned to Championship Wrestling from Florida to reform his "Prince of Darkness" group which included his then-wife Nancy, as "Fallen Angel" as well as Luna Vachon and Mike Davis.

== Production and reception ==
The World Wrestling Federation (WWF) was a competing professional wrestling promotion that was expanding nationally with the use of cable television and attempted to take over the market. Promotions under the governance of the NWA only operated within their territory, and the WWF was affecting their business and acquiring their top wrestlers. JCP, owned by Jim Crockett Jr., was one of the top promotions of the NWA and attempted to compete with the WWF by creating Starrcade. Starrcade was a large event, heavily promoted on televised events and broadcast on closed-circuit television via satellite in arenas around the promotion's regular tour stops.

Traditionally, major wrestling events were held by the promotion on Thanksgiving, Christmas and Easter, and Starrcade continued and spread the tradition by being held on Thanksgiving. Starrcade was headlined by the title match between Harley Race and Ric Flair and featured other major feuds across the territory. Since Race won the NWA World Heavyweight Championship in June, Crockett began planning Starrcade for Flair to regain the title in style. Dusty Rhodes was the booker of the promotion, one who creates storylines, schedules matches, and decides their outcomes. Starrcade was the inspiration of Rhodes. Wrestling historian Dave Meltzer has claimed that Dory Funk Jr. was the actual booker of the first Starrcade and the events leading up to it and that he came up with the idea for the show with Crockett. According to Meltzer, Rhodes came up with the name Starrcade and booked the show in subsequent years.

Starrcade drew a sold-out attendance of 15,447 and a $500,000 gate at the Greensboro Coliseum. The attendance at closed-circuit television broadcast locations was affected by a winter storm and drew around 30,000 people. Its use at the event popularized closed-circuit television broadcasting for professional wrestling events. Starrcade continued to be the flagship event of the promotion, held annually until the final Starrcade event in 2000.

== Results ==
No.	Results	Stipulations	Times
1	The Assassins (Assassin #1 and Assassin #2) (with Paul Jones) defeated Bugsy McGraw and Rufus R. Jones by pinfall	Tag team match	8:11
2	Kevin Sullivan and Mark Lewin (with Gary Hart) defeated Johnny Weaver and Scott McGhee by pinfall	Tag team match	6:43
3	Abdullah the Butcher defeated Carlos Colón by pinfall	Singles match	4:30
4	Bob Orton Jr. and Dick Slater defeated Mark Youngblood and Wahoo McDaniel by pinfall	Tag team match	14:48
5	Charlie Brown defeated The Great Kabuki (c) (with Gary Hart)	Title vs. mask match for the NWA Television Championship	10:35
6	Roddy Piper defeated Greg Valentine by pinfall	Dog collar match	16:08
7	Ricky Steamboat and Jay Youngblood defeated the Brisco Brothers (Gerald Brisco and Jack Brisco) (c) by pinfall	Tag team match for the NWA World Tag Team Championship with Angelo Mosca as special guest referee	13:24
8	Ric Flair defeated Harley Race (c) by pinfall	Steel cage match for the NWA World Heavyweight Championship with Gene Kiniski as special guest referee	23:49
(c) / – the champion(s) heading into the match
