= Bobby Eaton =

American professional wrestler (1958–2021)

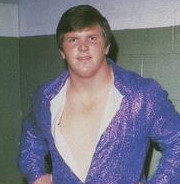
- Eaton in 1979

Personal information
- Born: Bobby Lee Eaton; August 14, 1958 Huntsville, Alabama, U.S.
- Died: August 4, 2021 (aged 62) Nashville, Tennessee, U.S.
- Spouse: Donna Dundee (m. 1981; died 2021)
- Children: 4

Professional wrestling career
- Ring name(s): "Beautiful" Bobby Eaton; Earl Robert Eaton
- Billed height: 6 ft 0 in (183 cm)
- Billed weight: 233 lb (106 kg)
- Billed from: Huntsville, Alabama "The Dark Side"; Stoke-on-Trent, England (as Earl Robert Eaton)
- Trained by: Tojo Yamamoto
- Debut: May 1976
- Retired: 2016

Bobby Lee Eaton (August 14, 1958 – August 4, 2021) was an American professional wrestler best known as "Beautiful" Bobby Eaton. He was most famous for his work in tag teams, especially as one-half of The Midnight Express. Under the management of Jim Cornette, he originally teamed with Dennis Condrey and, later on, with Stan Lane. He also worked with a number of other tag team partners, including Arn Anderson, Koko B. Ware, Steve Keirn, and Lord Steven Regal.

Over the course of his career, which lasted from 1976 to 2015, Eaton wrestled for extended periods of time for various wrestling promotions: NWA Mid-America, Continental Wrestling Association, Mid-South Wrestling, World Class Championship Wrestling, Jim Crockett Promotions, World Championship Wrestling, and Smoky Mountain Wrestling. He also made brief guest appearances for Extreme Championship Wrestling, Total Nonstop Action Wrestling, and a considerable number of independent wrestling promotions over the years. He held a large number of championships, including the NWA/WCW World Tag Team Championship on three occasions. Eaton was inducted into the Wrestling Observer Newsletter Hall of Fame in 2009 and the Professional Wrestling Hall of Fame in 2019.

== Early life ==
Eaton grew up in Huntsville, Alabama, where he attended Chapman Middle School and Lee High School. As a youth, he was a fan of professional wrestling, especially the NWA Mid-America promotion. This promotion was operated by Nick Gulas, who staged wrestling shows in the Alabama and Tennessee region. Eaton's first involvement in the sport came at the age of 13 when he helped set up wrestling rings in his hometown. He later trained under Tojo Yamamoto to become a professional wrestler.

== Professional wrestling career ==
=== NWA Mid-America (1976–1980) ===
In May 1976, at the age of 17, Eaton made his debut in NWA Mid-America. He entered his first match, a loss to Bearcat Wright, as a last-minute substitute for Wright's absent opponent. He quickly became a regular in Mid-America and continued to train with the more experienced wrestlers. Before long, fans, as well as promoter Nick Gulas, noticed Eaton's athleticism and showmanship. Gulas decided to "promote" Eaton up the ranks of NWA Mid-America, giving him matches later in the show, closer to the main event. The angle that helped elevate Eaton's name up the card in the promotion took place after the introduction of the tag team The Hollywood Blonds (Jerry Brown and Buddy Roberts). Eaton fought the Blonds with a variety of partners, including his old trainer Yamamoto and "Pistol" Pez Whatley. When the Blonds decided to move to a different wrestling promotion, the storyline maintained that Eaton was responsible for driving them out of NWA Mid-America.

In 1978, Eaton teamed with Leapin' Lanny Poffo, and together they won the NWA Mid-America Tag Team Championship from Gypsy Joe and Leroy Rochester. It was Eaton's first title win, and he and Poffo held it for a little over a month. Eaton went on to form a team, known as The Jet Set, with George Gulas, Nick Gulas's son. Together, Eaton and Gulas held the tag team title three times. During their time as a team, the two were involved in a storyline feud with Terry Gordy and Michael Hayes before Gordy and Hayes became famous under the name The Fabulous Freebirds.

In the spring of 1979, Eaton started a feud with Chris Colt, designed to establish Eaton as more than just a good tag team competitor. The feud between the two was so heated that it saw Colt suspended for piledriving Eaton on the concrete floor, making it appear Eaton had been seriously injured. Eaton suffered no injuries, however. At that time, the piledriver was banned in most federations and treated as a move that could potentially paralyze a wrestler. This was done to give the move more "shock value". Eaton conclusively defeated Colt, earning a place as one of the top faces (good guys) in NWA Mid-America. During 1979 and 1980, Eaton worked a series of singles matches against Dennis Condrey, a man he would later team up with to gain worldwide fame.

At the end of 1979, Eaton turned heel (bad guy) for the first time in his career by joining Tojo Yamamoto's group of wrestlers, whom the fans hated. Although Eaton is now thought of mainly as a heel, his fans were surprised at the time. Eaton's heel run did not last long before he rescued his former Jet Set partner, George Gulas, from a two-on-one attack by The Blond Bombers (Larry Latham and Wayne Ferris) to return to the fan-favorite side once more. After reuniting the team, Eaton and Gulas had one final run with tag team champions and worked an intense feud with Latham and Ferris.

=== Continental Wrestling Association (1980–1983) ===
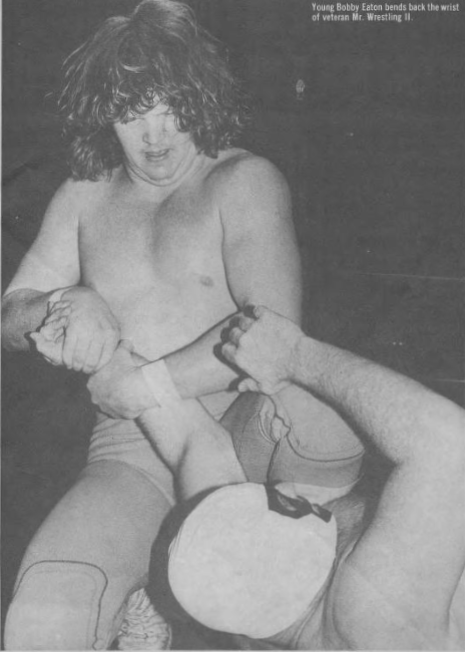
Eaton in a match against Mr. Wrestling II in 1981

When Nick Gulas' wrestling promotion closed due to dwindling ticket sales, Eaton briefly wrestled for Georgia Championship Wrestling, even capturing the NWA National Television Championship. Before long Eaton returned closer to home, working for promoter Jerry Jarrett's Continental Wrestling Association (CWA), which was centered in Memphis, Tennessee. During his early days in the promotion, Eaton faced Stan Lane several times in tag team competition. Eaton's most successful partnership in the CWA, in terms of title wins, was with Sweet Brown Sugar, named the "New Wave". The two wrestlers blended their athleticism and high flying abilities to form a very successful team. The New Wave held the AWA Southern Tag Team Championship three times (twice with manager Jimmy Hart in their corner).

After achieving success as a tag team, it was decided that Eaton and Sugar should split up and feud with each other. This storyline resulted in Eaton "forcing" Sugar out of the promotion via a Loser Leaves Town match. Sugar's disappearance was soon followed by the appearance of a masked man called Stagger Lee, who was virtually identically to Sugar. Eaton, along with the rest of Jimmy Hart's stable the "First Family", tried in vain to unmask Stagger Lee.

Eaton turned face when Lee saved him from an attack by The Moondogs, and the team reunited, although Sugar continued to use the Stagger Lee gimmick. The team regained the tag team title before losing it to the Fabulous Ones (Stan Lane and Steve Keirn). Afterward, Eaton teamed up with Moondog Rex and Moondog Spot) to face Jerry Lawler and the Fabulous Ones. During the match, one of the Moondogs accidentally hit Eaton with their trademark bone, costing their side the match. After the match ended, the Moondogs, as well as Jimmy Hart, turned on Eaton, beating him down until he was saved by Stagger Lee.

=== Mid-South Wrestling (1983–1984) ===
Soon after Eaton joined Mid-South Wrestling under promoter Bill Watts, he became part of the Midnight Express. Eaton teamed with former rival Dennis Condrey under the management of Jim Cornette to form a new version of the tag team. The Express had previously been a group of wrestlers consisting of Condrey, Randy Rose and Norvell Austin, but with Eaton's arrival, the Midnight Express worked exclusively as a two-man team. To complement the nickname "Lover Boy" Dennis, Eaton was nicknamed "Beautiful" Bobby (a reference to the phrase "Alabama the Beautiful"). At first, The Express was booked in an angle with the Mid-South Tag Team Champions Magnum T. A. and Mr. Wrestling II. The highlight of the angle saw Eaton and Condrey tarring and feathering Magnum T. A. in the middle of the ring. The Express first won the tag team title when Mr. Wrestling II turned on Magnum T. A., attacking him during the title match and allowing Eaton and Condrey to win the title without much opposition.

With Mr. Wrestling II and Magnum T. A. splitting up, the Midnight Express needed a new team to defend their newly won title against. They began a long series of matches against The Rock 'n' Roll Express (Ricky Morton and Robert Gibson) which ran well into the 1990s and spanned several wrestling promotions. The two teams feuded throughout 1984 in Mid-South Wrestling before the Midnight Express left the promotion. The Midnight Express versus Rock 'n' Roll Express series of matches were so well received by the fans that independent promoters continued to book them over a span of three decades and concluded with them wrestling the final match of the feud; Eaton against Ricky Morton. Morton won the match.

Eaton, Condrey, and Cornette left Mid-South Wrestling in December 1984.

=== World Class Championship Wrestling (1984–1985) ===
In December 1984, Eaton and Condrey (accompanied by Cornette) began wrestling regularly for the Texas-based World Class Championship Wrestling (WCCW) promotion. Upon arrival, they immediately began a feud with the Fantastics (Bobby Fulton and Tommy Rogers). At Christmas Star Wars in the Dallas Reunion Arena in December 1984, they unsuccessfully challenged the Fantastics for the NWA American Tag Team Championship. In January 1985, they defeated the Fantastics in the Dallas Sportatorium to win the NWA American Tag Team Championship. At Wrestling Star Wars later that month, they successfully defended the titles against the Fantastics. In March 1985, the titles were vacated after a controversial ending to a title match. At the 2nd Von Erich Memorial Parade of Champions in the Texas Stadium in May 1985, the Fantastics defeated the Midnight Express to win the vacant titles. The Midnight Express continued their feud with the Fantastics, but were unable to regain the titles. They left WCCW in June 1985, joining Jim Crockett Promotions that same month.

=== Jim Crockett Promotions / World Championship Wrestling (1985–1992) ===
==== The Midnight Express (1985–1990) ====
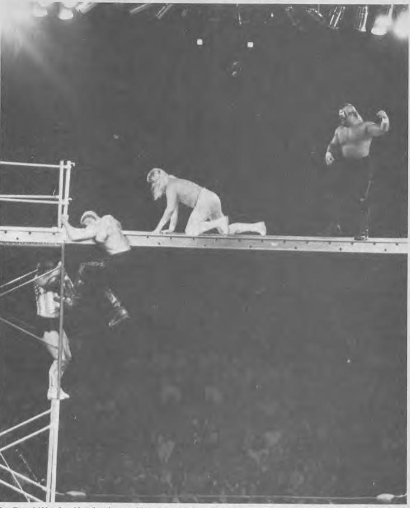
Eaton (crawling) during the Midnight Express's scaffold match against the Road Warriors at Starrcade '86: The Skywalkers

In June 1985, Eaton, Condrey and Cornette signed with Jim Crockett Promotions (JCP) and were given national exposure on JCP's televised programs on SuperStation TBS. Shortly after joining JCP, the Midnight Express reignited their feud with the Rock 'n' Roll Express and won the NWA World Tag Team Championship (Mid-Atlantic version) from them in February 1986 during Superstars on the Superstation. During the course of their heated angle, Eaton and Condrey re-lost the title to the Rock 'n' Roll Express six months later. Eaton and Condrey also had long running feuds with The New Breed and the Road Warriors . The feud with the Road Warriors included a scaffold match at Starrcade '86: The Skywalkers, which the Midnight Express lost.

In early 1987, Condrey left JCP for undisclosed reasons, and "Sweet" Stan Lane took his place as part of the Midnight Express. In May 1987, after teaming for only a few months, Eaton and Lane became champions when they won the NWA United States Tag team title for the first time, a title they would win three times during their time together.

A year later, the team was cheered on despite being heels, as the Midnight Express won the NWA World Tag Team Title from Arn Anderson and Tully Blanchard on September 10, 1988. This feud was cut short when Anderson & Blanchard signed with the WWF over money issues. The Midnight Express' run with the title lasted a little over a month and a half before the Road Warriors took the gold from them in a brutal match up, which saw the heel Road Warriors brutalize the now-popular Midnight Express. Now the fan favorites, the Midnight Express had to contend with a team thought to be disbanded forever: the Original Midnight Express, which consisted of Condrey and Randy Rose, who joined JCP after a brief run in the AWA. The duo was led by long-time Jim Cornette nemesis Paul E. Dangerously, in a storyline that saw them trying to prove the originals were better than the new version. The surprise appearance of the Original Midnight Express gave Dangerously's team the initial momentum in the feud, but soon after, Condrey left the promotion once more. This forced the bookers to bring in Jack Victory as a replacement as Condrey's disappearance cut the promising feud short.

The Midnight Express then turned their attention to Paul E.'s new team, the Samoan SWAT Team as well as a new version of The Fabulous Freebirds. Eaton and Lane were defeated by the Freebirds in the finals of a tournament for the vacated World Tag Team Titles. Following this loss, the Midnight Express teamed with their former enemies The Road Warriors and "Dr. Death" Steve Williams to defeat the SST and the Freebirds in a WarGames match at The Great American Bash.

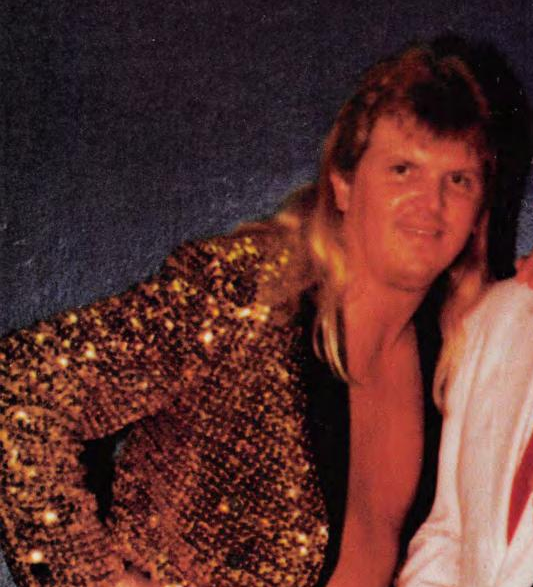
Eaton in 1988

Following this feud, Lane and Eaton began having issues with a young new team in the NWA known as "the Dynamic Dudes" (Shane Douglas and Johnny Ace). The Dudes admitted that the Midnight Express was one of their favorite teams and asked if Cornette would be their manager as well. Cornette agreed to manage the young team, to the displeasure of the Midnight Express. After arguing with the Express, Jim Cornette stopped accompanying Eaton and Lane to the ring, choosing to only actively manage the Dudes. At Clash of Champions IX, the two teams met with Jim Cornette appearing in a neutral corner, forced to choose between the teams. The Express started out very aggressively, especially for a team that was supposed to be fan favorites, and when the night was over, the Midnight Express had once again established themselves as heels with Jim Cornette in their corner; Cornette had never stopped siding with the Express.

After returning to their cheating ways, the Midnight Express started a storyline with the up-and-coming team of Flyin' Brian and "Z-Man" Tom Zenk over the United States Tag Team Championship. The Express won the title from the young team in early 1990, but lost the belts to the Steiner Brothers three months later. After a loss at Halloween Havoc 1990 in October, the Midnight Express split up, as Jim Cornette and Stan Lane left the federation, while Eaton chose to remain in WCW. For the first time in almost a decade, there was no Midnight Express.

==== World Television Champion (1990–1991) ====
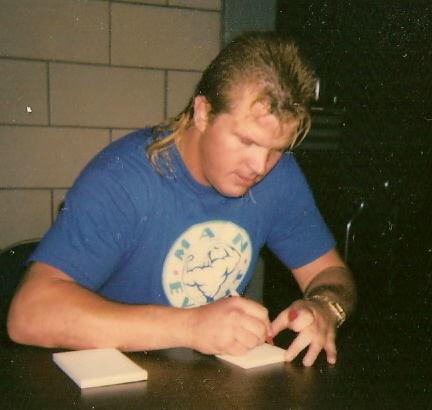
Eaton in 1991

For the first time since 1979, Eaton was a singles competitor, and he faced an uphill struggle to establish himself. He wrestled his former opponents in tag team competition such as Brad Armstrong (whom he defeated at WrestleWar '91), Ricky Morton and "Z-Man" Tom Zenk (whom he defeated at Starrcade '90: Collision Course, but lost to at Clash of the Champions XIV), but it was not until he turned face during the early parts of 1991 that he started to move up the rankings. Per a Wrestling Observer Newsletter report, Eaton signed a two-year contract worth $170,000 (equivalent to $402,000 in 2025) a year in January 1991.

At SuperBrawl I on May 19, 1991, Eaton defeated Arn Anderson to win the WCW World Television Championship. Eaton's highest profile match as a singles wrestler came when he faced off against the World Heavyweight Champion "Nature Boy" Ric Flair at Clash of the Champions XV in a two-out-of-three falls match. Eaton pinned Flair in the first fall, but ultimately lost to Flair two falls to one. His World Television Championship reign was short-lived losing the title to newcomer "Stunning" Steve Austin, who leveraged his manager and Eaton's tights to get the pinfall victory. The match aired on tape delay on June 29, 1991, though was taped on June 3, nine days before the Clash, so Eaton was only mentioned as champion during the Top 10 rankings segment at that event.

==== Dangerous Alliance (1991–1992) ====
Late in 1991, Paul E. Dangerously formed the faction the Dangerous Alliance. Eaton joined the group when he assisted Rick Rude, with the storyline being that Dangerously had brought Rude to WCW, in defeating Sting for the United States Championship. In joining the group, Eaton became allies with Rude, Larry Zbyszko, and his two former rivals for the World Television Championship in Arn Anderson and Steve Austin. Shortly after the group was formed, Anderson and Eaton became its tag team specialists as both men had been successful tag team wrestlers in their careers; Anderson himself had been a two-time world champion teaming with Tully Blanchard in the Four Horsemen and had also won the belts with Zbyszko earlier in the year. Eaton and Anderson quickly won the WCW World Tag Team Championship by defeating Ricky Steamboat and Dustin Rhodes, the team to whom Anderson and Zbyszko lost the belts, for the championship and held on to the belts for five months before they lost them to the Steiner Brothers. At one point during 1992, the Dangerous Alliance held every title except the WCW World Title, which was held by their main opponent and arch enemy Sting. The war between the Dangerous Alliance and Sting and friends escalated until it was decided to settle it in a double-ring War Games match at WrestleWar 1992. Sting's team won when Sting forced Eaton to give up after Larry Zbyszko accidentally struck Eaton in the arm with a metal rod. This match would be given a 5-star rating from Dave Meltzer of the Wrestling Observer Newsletter.

In the aftermath of the War Games match, Zbyszko was kicked out of the Alliance for causing the Alliance loss. Soon after the Alliance disintegrated, Paul E. Dangerously left WCW. Eaton and Anderson continued to team after the Alliance fell apart, now managed by Michael Hayes. Eaton and Anderson worked in the tag team division until new WCW booker Bill Watts fired Eaton along with a number of other WCW regulars in a cost-cutting measure.

=== Smoky Mountain Wrestling (1993) ===
When Eaton found himself without a job, he reached out to former manager Jim Cornette. Cornette had started his own wrestling promotion, Smoky Mountain Wrestling (SMW), and welcomed Eaton with open arms. Eaton joined up with the Heavenly Bodies (Stan Lane and Tom Prichard), and the three were booked as the company's top heels for a while. Eaton also won the SMW version of the TV title, known as the SMW Beat the Champ Television Championship.

=== New Japan Pro-Wrestling (1993, 1994, 1995) ===
Eaton first toured through Japan with New Japan Pro-Wrestling in May 1993 during their Explosion Tour, teaming with Tony Halme and in various tag team matches, facing teams such as Hiroshi Hase and Keiji Mutoh, Manabu Nakanishi and Masa Saito, Shinya Hashimoto and Michiyoshi Ohara, Riki Choshu and Takayuki Iizuka and even Hawk Warrior and Power Warrior, known as the Hellraisers, with the latter putting their IWGP Tag Team Championships on the line on June 14, in which Eaton and Halme lost. In January 1994, Eaton went back to Japan during their Fighting Spirit tour, wrestling only in tag team matches (with the exception of a singles match against Black Cat and another against Power Warrior) teaming with Rambo and Mike Enos. In November 1995 during their NJPW/WCW World in Japan tour, Eaton, now under the "Earl Robert Eaton" character, toured with New Japan for the last time, wrestling only two tag team matches in two days, teaming with Johnny B. Badd (the announcers mistakenly and constantly referred him as Bobby instead of Robert) in a losing effort against the Ookami Gundan (Masahiro Chono and Hiroyoshi Tenzan) and another losing effort alongside Lord Steven Regal against Kensuke Sasaki and Osamu Nishimura.

=== Return to WCW (1993–2000) ===
==== Tag teams and singles appearances (1993–1995) ====
When Bill Watts was ousted from his position in WCW in favor of Eric Bischoff in 1993, Eaton was rehired. Once back on the roster, Eaton teamed up with a young Chris Benoit in Benoit's first stint with WCW. Together they were mainly used to help establish rising teams or give established teams opposition. After Benoit left to return to Japan, in Eaton's next venture in tag teaming, under the name "Bad Attitude", he teamed up with Steve Keirn, formerly of the Fabulous Ones. Bad Attitude's single noteworthy moment together came when they were present as Arn Anderson turned on tag team partner Dustin Rhodes. Otherwise, the team did not get much exposure. During this time, Eaton also made a couple of appearances in ECW due to a talent trade arrangement between WCW and ECW. At the When Worlds Collide show on May 14, 1994, he teamed with Sabu to beat Arn Anderson and Terry Funk.

==== Blue Bloods (1995–1996) ====
After Bad Attitude quietly ended, Eaton was placed with British snob Lord Steven Regal. A series of vignettes followed, in which Regal educated Eaton on how to be a man of class and sophistication. Eaton became "Earl Robert Eaton" and along with Regal and "Squire" David Taylor, formed the Blue Bloods. The team initially feuded with the Nasty Boys (Brian Knobs and Jerry Sags), their complete opposites in terms of "sophistication" and presentation. They also feuded with Harlem Heat (Booker T and Stevie Ray) over the World Tag Team Championship, but never took the belts. In all of 1996 the team members made only one pay-per-view (PPV) appearance, as individuals in the "Lethal Lottery" during May's Slamboree. Later that year, Regal won the World Television Championship. Not long after, Eaton was moved out of the group, turning on his partners, and wrestled Regal for the television championship on two occasions.

==== Final years and departure (1996–2000) ====
The Blue Bloods storyline represented the last serious push that Eaton was given by the WCW booking team. After the run with Regal and Taylor ended, Eaton was simply known as Bobby Eaton and wrestled mainly on WCW Saturday Night and WCW WorldWide and at house shows, occasionally winning against wrestlers lower on the card and losing to wrestlers above him. Eaton helped train wrestlers at the WCW Power Plant. In early-1999, Eaton carried out motion capture work for the video game WCW Mayhem. Eaton was released from WCW in March 2000, ending a 15-year run with the company, just before the regime under Eric Bischoff and Vince Russo kicked in.

=== Late career (2000–2016) ===
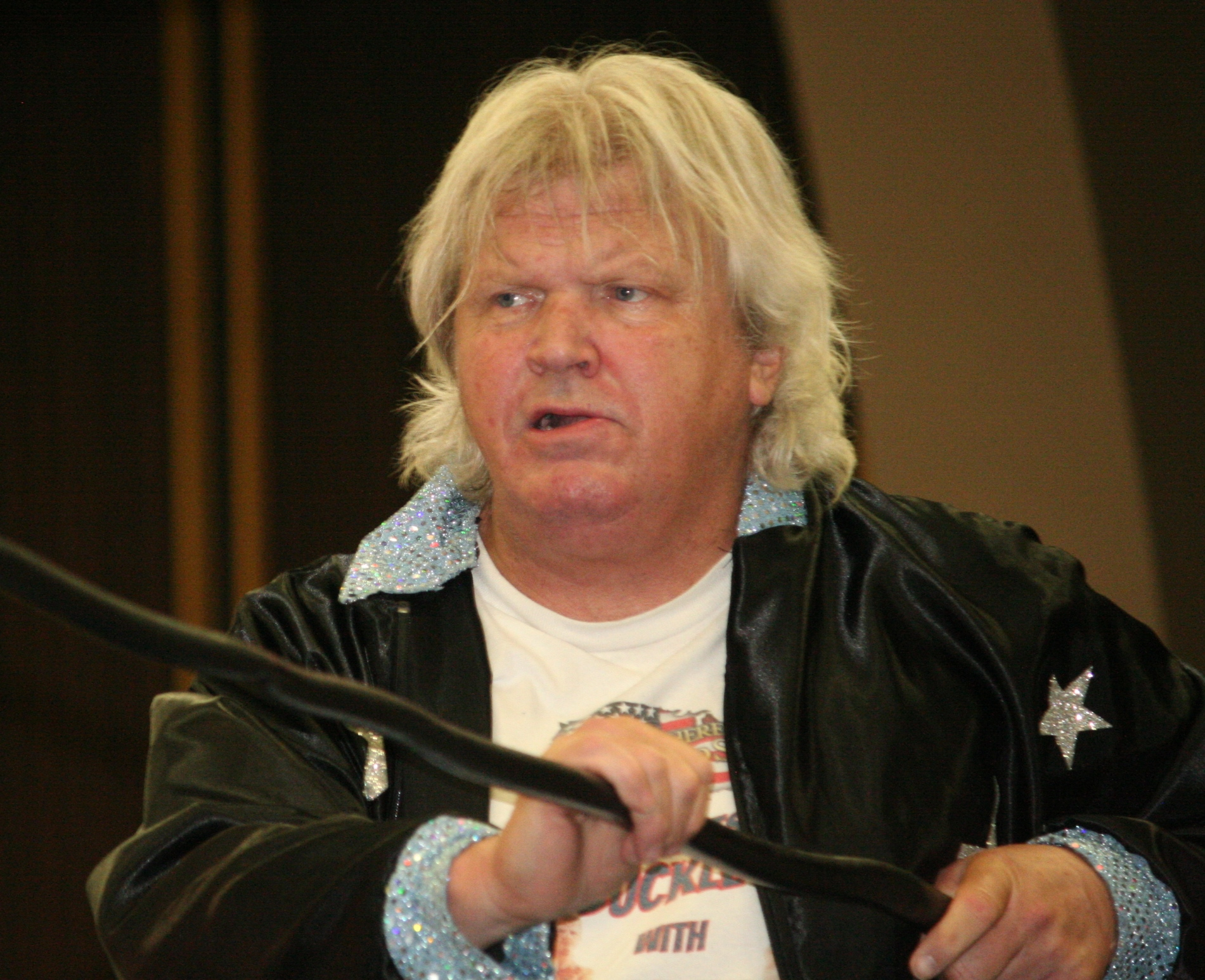
Eaton in 2014

After his release from WCW, Eaton began working in the independent circuit. In July 2000, he made a brief return to ECW. By November 2000, he mainly wrestled for NWA Mid-Atlantic where he feuded with Ricky Morton. In January 2001, Eaton signed with the World Wrestling Federation as a trainer for their developmental territories. In February 2001, he went to the WWF's Memphis developmental system, Power Pro Wrestling, where he aligned himself with Brandon Baxter and Victoria against Bill Dundee, Jerry Lawler and The Kat. However, the intense feud was cut short, as a month later, WWF cut ties with Power Pro, due to Lawler quitting the promotion over the Kat's firing in late February. Power Pro would eventually fold and Eaton moved on to Louisville for Ohio Valley Wrestling. He would also go to Cincinnati for Heartland Wrestling Association, most notably appearing on the 2001 Brian Pillman Memorial Show. Accompanied by Cornette, he wrestled Terry Taylor in a Legends match with Ricky Steamboat as the special guest referee. Eventually, Eaton would be released in 2002.

After his WWF release, Eaton returned to the independents, returning to NWA Mid-Atlantic and also wrestled for IWA Mid-South. Eaton made a one-night only appearance for Total Nonstop Action Wrestling (TNA) on August 13, 2003, as a part of a Kid Kash storyline where Kash faced off against a series of 1980s wrestling stars such as Larry Zbyszko and Ricky Morton. Eaton lost to Kid Kash in his only TNA appearance.

In 2003, Eaton formed a new version of the Midnight Express with Rikki Nelson, whom he previously teamed with in 2000. This Midnight Express version was very short-lived, and Eaton instead began touring with Dennis Condrey (and sometimes Stan Lane) as the Midnight Express in 2004. This version of the Midnight Express performed together on select independent wrestling cards in the United States until 2011 when Condrey worked his last match. On October 23, 2015, Eaton wrestled one of the final matches of his nearly 40-year career, losing to Ricky Morton, also ending the 30-plus year feud between The Rock 'n' Roll Express and The Midnight Express. Eaton wrestled his last match on March 19, 2016 of his nearly 40-year career, competed in a 15 man battle royal won by PoPo Da Klown at RWC Seek 2 Destroy Cancer in Fayetteville, North Carolina.

== Professional wrestling style and persona ==
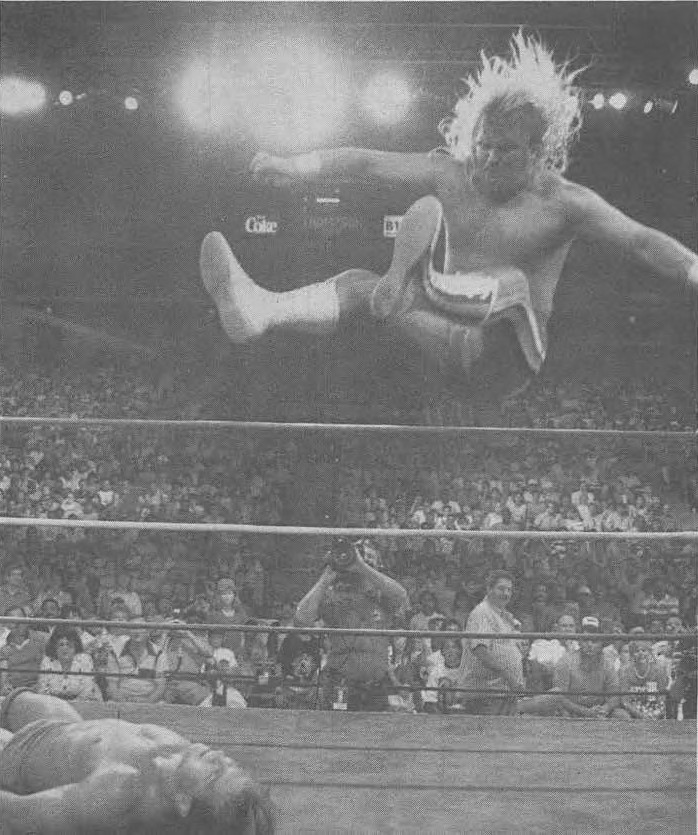
Eaton delivering the "Alabama Jam" diving legdrop on Tommy Rogers, c. 1988

At the outset of his career, Eaton wrestled as a babyface. After joining The Midnight Express, he adopted the villainous persona of "Beautiful" Bobby Eaton. In the mid-1990s, upon teaming with Lord Steven Regal, Eaton became Earl Robert Eaton, a haughty supposed aristocrat.

Eaton wrestled in a technical style. His principal finishing move was the "Alabama Jam", a diving legdrop. During his stint as Earl Robert Eaton, he renamed it the "Tower of London". His signature moves included a spinning neckbreaker and an armbar DDT known as the "Divorce Court" for its purported ability to cause a separated shoulder.

Eaton was highly regarded for his psychology and timing. Former tag team partner William Regal noted Eaton's "incredible precision to everything he did", timing, control, and ability to improvise. Writing in 2006, ring announcer Gary Michael Cappetta described Eaton as "one of the most flawless workers still active in the business". Fellow wrestler Stone Cold Steve Austin described wrestling Eaton as "a night off" due to Eaton's in-ring offense that looked convincing but did not hurt his opponents. For much of his career, Eaton was a tag team wrestler. As one-half of The Midnight Express, he utilized "quick tags" and "innovative double-team maneuvers". Missy Hyatt described The Midnight Express as being able to "go forty-five minutes in the ring and never repeat a move".

=== Reputation ===
Eaton was often regarded as one of the nicest people in the wrestling business, even though he wrestled as a heel for a majority of his career. In his 1999 book Have a Nice Day, Mick Foley praised Eaton as being one of the most underrated superstars in the business, and its nicest, commenting: "It was damn near impossible to pay for anything with Bobby around, though I will confess to not trying that hard." Jim Cornette and Sean Waltman noted that Eaton would regularly travel with an extra suitcase filled with toiletries, socks, and other oft-forgotten items that he would give to anyone who needed them, which Steve Austin recalled in his 2003 autobiography The Stone Cold Truth.

== Personal life ==
=== Family ===
In 1981, Eaton married Donna Cruickshanks (1963–2021), the daughter of Scottish-Australian professional wrestler Bill Dundee. When they first started dating, they had to keep the relationship secret from her father as he had forbidden her from dating the wrestlers he was booking; however, when he found out she was dating Eaton, he relented because Eaton was such a nice man. The couple had four children: Jason (born 1982), Dustin (born 1984), Taryn (born 1986), and Dylan (born 1988), the latter of whom is also a professional wrestler. Donna died from breast cancer at the age of 57 on June 26, 2021.

=== Health issues ===
In September 2006, it was reported that Eaton was hospitalized after suffering a heart attack. Eaton later released a statement saying that he did not have a heart attack, but was instead diagnosed with high blood pressure with "a hint of" diabetes. After that, he suffered with several health issues, especially cardiac problems which saw him hospitalized on several occasions. In June 2013, Eaton underwent successful surgery to have a pacemaker inserted. On July 24, 2021, it was reported that Eaton suffered a fall at his home in Nashville, breaking several fingers and injuring his hip.

=== Death ===
On August 4, 2021, just over a month after his wife's death, and 10 days prior to his own 63rd birthday, Eaton died in his sleep at his home in Nashville, Tennessee. He was found dead by his daughter Taryn, who had recently moved in with him to monitor his health.

A memorial service for Eaton was held on August 24 in Antioch, Tennessee. Numerous family as well as wrestlers from numerous promotions gathered. Charles Robinson, Stan Lane, Tom Prichard, Jim Cornette, and Arn Anderson as well as Eaton’s father in law Bill Dundee were among the notable people in attendance.

== Championships and accomplishments ==
- Continental Wrestling Association
  - AWA Southern Tag Team Championship (4 times) – with Sweet Brown Sugar (2) and Duke Myers (2)
  - CWA World Heavyweight Championship (1 time)
  - NWA Mid-America Heavyweight Championship (5 times)
- Georgia Championship Wrestling
  - NWA Georgia Television Championship (1 time)
- International Wrestling Council
  - IWC Tag Team Championship (1 time) – with Dennis Condrey
- Jim Crockett Promotions / World Championship Wrestling
  - NWA United States Tag Team Championship (3 times) – with Stan Lane
  - NWA/WCW World Tag Team Championship (3 times) – with Dennis Condrey (1), Stan Lane (1) and Arn Anderson (1)
  - WCW World Television Championship (1 time)
- Memphis Wrestling Hall of Fame
  - Class of 2017
- Mid-Atlantic Championship Wrestling (Note: This Mid-Atlantic promotion, while having revived some of the championships used by the previous Mid-Atlantic promotion, is not the same promotion once owned by Jim Crockett Jr.that went on to be renamed World Championship Wrestling after being sold to Ted Turner in November 1988.)
  - NWA Mid-Atlantic Tag Team Championship (1 time) – with Rikki Nelson
- National Wrestling Alliance
  - NWA Hall of Fame (class of 2008)
- Mid-South Wrestling
  - Mid-South Tag Team Championship (2 times) – with Dennis Condrey
- NWA Bluegrass
  - NWA Bluegrass Tag Team Championship (1 time) – with Dennis Condrey
- NWA Mid-America
  - NWA Mid-America Heavyweight Championship (5 times)
  - NWA Mid-America Tag Team Championship (6 times) – with Lanny Poffo (1), George Gulas (3), Mexican Angel (1) and Great Togo (1)
  - NWA Mid-America Television Championship (1 time)
  - NWA World Six-Man Tag Team Championship (4 times) – with George Gulas and Jerry Barber (1), George Gulas and Arvil Hutto (1), George Gulas and The Mexican Angel (1), and Secret Weapon and Tojo Yamamoto (1)
- NWA Rocky Top
  - NWA Rocky Top Tag Team Championship (1 time) – with Dennis Condrey
- Pro Wrestling Illustrated
  - Tag Team of the Year (1987) – with Stan Lane
  - Ranked No. 27 of the top 500 singles wrestlers in the PWI 500 in 1992
  - Ranked No. 91 of the top 500 singles wrestlers of the "PWI Years" in 2003
- Professional Wrestling Hall of Fame
  - Class of 2019 - Inducted as part of The Midnight Express with Dennis Condrey and Randy Rose
- Smoky Mountain Wrestling
  - SMW Beat the Champ Television Championship (1 time)
- World Class Championship Wrestling
  - NWA American Tag Team Championship (1 time) – with Dennis Condrey
- Wrestling Observer Newsletter
  - Wrestling Observer Newsletter Hall of Fame (Class of 2009) with Dennis Condrey and Stan Lane as the Midnight Express
  - Most Underrated (1985, 1986, 1990, 1993)
  - Tag Team of the Year (1986) with Dennis Condrey
  - Tag Team of the Year (1987, 1988) with Stan Lane
  - Worst Worked Match of the Year (1991) with P. N. News vs. Terrance Taylor and Steve Austin in a Scaffold match at The Great American Bash

== See also ==
- The Blue Bloods
- Dangerous Alliance
- The Midnight Express
