= Tom Miller (broadcaster) =

Thomas Edward Miller (April 1, 1940 – March 17, 1993) was an American radio personality and emcee in Greensboro, North Carolina.

Miller was born on April 1, 1940. His father was a Baptist preacher. He got his start in the Greensboro market at WGBG, where he was a disc jockey and program director. In 1973, he moved to WBT in Charlotte, North Carolina, where he hosted the Truckin' Tom Show. In 1975, he won Billboard's Country Disc Jockey of the Year Award. He returned to Greensboro, where he once again worked for WGBG and was master of ceremonies for country music and professional wrestling events at the Greensboro Coliseum. In 1977, he became WGBG's station operations manager. He left the airwaves the following year to accept a sales position at the station. During the 1980s, he was a deejay and station manager for WAKG in Danville, Virginia. In 1988, he returned to Charlotte as the overnight host at WLVK. Miller died on March 17, 1993, at his home in Monroe, North Carolina.
