= 1995 in UFC =

Mixed martial arts events

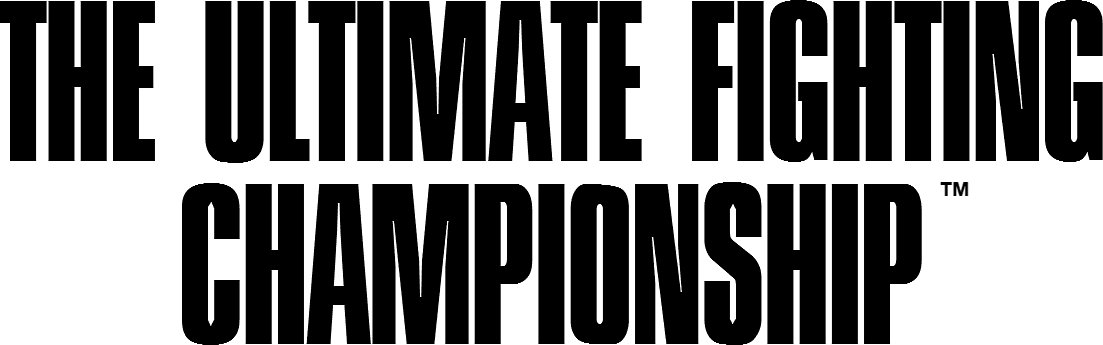

Information
- First date: April 7, 1995
- Last date: December 16, 1995

Events
- Total events: 4
- UFC: 3

Fights
- Total fights: 42
- Title fights: 2

Chronology
1994 in UFC	1995 in UFC	1996 in UFC

The year 1995 was the 3rd year in the history of the Ultimate Fighting Championship (UFC), a mixed martial arts promotion based in the United States. In 1995 the UFC held 4 events beginning with, UFC 5.

== Title fights ==
Title fights in 1995
Weight class				Method	Round	Time	Event	Notes
	Ken Shamrock	vs.	Royce Gracie	Draw		36:06	UFC 5	(Note: Superfight Championship bout: Gracie and Shamrock fought to a draw after 36:00 because there were no judges. This was a new record length for a UFC fight.)
	Ken Shamrock	def.	Dan Severn	Submission (guillotine choke)		2:14	UFC 6	(Note: Shamrock defeated Severn via submission (guillotine choke) at 2:14 to become the first UFC Superfight Champion.)
	Ken Shamrock (c)	vs.	Oleg Taktarov	Draw		33:00	UFC 7	(Note: Shamrock and Taktarov fought to a draw after 33:00 because there were no judges. Shamrock retains the UFC Superfight Championship.)

== Debut UFC fighters ==
The following fighters fought their first UFC fight in 1995:

ISO	Fighter
(United States)	Andy Anderson
(United States)	Asbel Cancio
(Canada)	Dave Beneteau
(United States)	David Hood
(United States)	Ernie Verdicia
(Italy)	Francesco Maturi
(United States)	Gerry Harris
(United States)	Geza Kalman
(United States)	He-Man Ali Gipson

ISO	Fighter
(United States)	Jack McLaughlin
(United States)	Joel Sutton
(United States)	John Dowdy
(United States)	John Matua
(United States)	Jon Hess
(United States)	Larry Cureton
(Brazil)	Marco Ruas
(United States)	Mark Hall

ISO	Fighter
(Russia)	Oleg Taktarov
(Philippines)	Onassis Parungao
(United States)	Paul Varelans
(United States)	Rudyard Moncayo
(United States)	Ryan Parker
(United States)	Scott Bessac
(United States)	Tank Abbott
(United States)	Todd Medina

== Events list ==
#	Event	Date	Venue	Location	Attendance
008	UFC The Ultimate Ultimate	Dec 16, 1995	Mammoth Gardens	Denver, Colorado, U.S.	2,800
007	UFC 7: The Brawl in Buffalo	Sep 8, 1995	Buffalo Memorial Auditorium	Buffalo, New York, U.S.	9,000
006	UFC 6: Clash of the Titans	Jul 14, 1995	Casper Events Center	Casper, Wyoming, U.S.	2,700
005	UFC 5: The Return of the Beast	Apr 7, 1995	Independence Arena	Charlotte, North Carolina, U.S.	6,000

== See also ==
- UFC
- List of UFC champions
- List of UFC events
