= Vitor Belfort =

Brazilian-American mixed martial arts fighter

Vítor Belfort
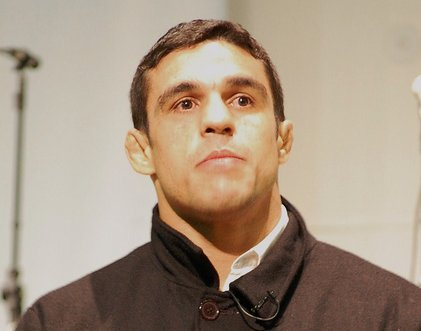
- Belfort in 2008
- Born: Vítor Vieira Belfort; 1 April 1977 (age 49); Rio de Janeiro, Brazil
- Nickname: The Phenom
- Nationality: Brazilian; American
- Height: 6 ft 0 in (1.83 m)
- Weight: 185 lb (84 kg; 13 st 3 lb)
- Division: Heavyweight (1996–1997, 1999–2001); Light heavyweight (1998–2007, 2012, 2013); Middleweight (2008–2018)
- Reach: 74 in (188 cm)
- Stance: Southpaw
- Fighting out of: Rio de Janeiro, Brazil
- Team: Kill Cliff FC; Brazilian Top Team; RVCA Training Centre; Xtreme Couture (2008)
- Rank: Black belt in Brazilian Jiu-Jitsu under Carlson Gracie; Black belt in Judo; Purple belt in Shotokan Karate
- Years active: 1996–2018 (MMA); 2006, 2021–present (Boxing)

Professional boxing record
- Total: 2
- Wins: 2
- By knockout: 1

Mixed martial arts record
- Total: 41
- Wins: 26
- By knockout: 18
- By submission: 3
- By decision: 5
- Losses: 14
- By knockout: 7
- By submission: 2
- By decision: 5
- No contests: 1

Other information
- Spouse: Joana Prado
- Notable students: Cezar Ferreira
- Boxing record from BoxRec
- Mixed martial arts record from Sherdog

Vítor Vieira Belfort (Portuguese pronunciation: [ˈvitoʁ viˈejɾɐ bɛwˈfɔʁ]; born 1 April 1977) is a Brazilian-American professional boxer and retired mixed martial artist who competed for the Ultimate Fighting Championship (UFC), where he fought in the Heavyweight, Light Heavyweight, and Middleweight divisions. He is the UFC 12 Heavyweight Tournament Champion, as well as a former UFC Light Heavyweight Champion and Cage Rage World Light Heavyweight Champion. Known for his explosive knockout power, Belfort is tied for ninth for the most finishes in UFC history with 14. Belfort also competed for MMA promotions Pride FC, Strikeforce, and Affliction.

== Background ==
Born and raised in Rio de Janeiro, Brazil, Belfort began training in boxing at the age of 12 under Claudio Coelho. Belfort later studied Brazilian jiu-jitsu with Carlson Gracie, who gave him his black belt. Gracie scouted Belfort at the Brazilian National Jiu-Jitsu Championships, where he won the Absolute and Heavyweight titles for blue belts under age 18. Belfort, 17 at the time, was invited to compete at Gracie's gym, where he trained with the likes of Murilo Bustamante, Ricardo Loborio, Ricardo De La Riva, Mario Sperry, and Wallid Ismail.

== Mixed martial arts career ==
At the age of 19, Belfort came to the United States to compete. In his first sanctioned mixed martial arts match, an event called Superbrawl in Hawaii, his opponent was Jon Hess, whom the young Brazilian defeated in 12 seconds by knockout, despite Hess having a seven-inch height advantage and a more than 100-pound weight advantage over Belfort.

=== Ultimate Fighting Championship ===
Soon after, he moved on to compete in the UFC, where he was given the nickname The Phenom. He beat two fighters in his debut event in the UFC, winning the UFC 12 Heavyweight Tournament. At age 19, Belfort became the youngest fighter to score a victory inside the octagon. Belfort's next match saw him score a technical knockout (TKO) against the UFC 6 runner-up Tank Abbott in a non-tournament fight, knocking Abbott down and finishing him with a ground and pound attack.

==== Heavyweight bouts ====
In 1997 Belfort fought against American Greco-Roman wrestler Randy Couture, the first of three fights they would have. Belfort was upset by TKO 8:16 into the match, his boxing skills negated by Couture's clinch fighting.

After this defeat, he would fight twice more in the UFC. The first of these fights was against a training partner of his, Joe Charles, whom he defeated quickly via armbar without throwing a single punch.

==== Light heavyweight debut ====
A year later, Belfort faced rising Brazilian star and future PRIDE Middleweight Champion Wanderlei Silva. Catching Silva early with a left cross, Belfort chased him across the cage with a flurry of punches, knocking Silva out by TKO in just 44 seconds.

=== PRIDE Fighting Championships / Heavyweight sophomore ===
Vítor then moved on to fight in Japan's PRIDE Fighting Championships. His first opponent was Kazushi Sakuraba in 1999. Vítor controlled the first minutes of the fight before Sakuraba scored a takedown. He spent the remainder of the fight on his back being stomped and kicked by Sakuraba. Following the fight he stopped training with Carlson Gracie and started to train with Brazilian Top Team.

==== Light heavyweight sophomore ====
He fought in PRIDE against Alistair Overeem, Gilbert Yvel, Daijiro Matsui, Bobby Southworth, and Heath Herring. For these matches Belfort used his stand-up striking skills less and instead controlled the fights and won by ground-and-pound tactics, with the exception of his fight with Southworth, which he won via rear-naked choke in the first round. However, in the opening round of the 2005 Middleweight Grand Prix he faced Alistair Overeem, losing via first-round guillotine choke.

=== Return to the UFC ===
Returning to the UFC, Belfort was scheduled to fight Tito Ortiz in the main event of UFC's first Las Vegas show at UFC 33. However, he sustained an injury prior to the event, and the bout was cancelled. Belfort eventually returned and fought Chuck Liddell (losing via decision), then Marvin Eastman (winning via TKO and opening a severe cut on Eastman's eyebrow with a knee strike).

==== Winning and losing the title/Belfort vs. Couture II & III ====
His next fight was on 31 January 2004, a rematch with Randy Couture for the UFC Light heavyweight Championship. Despite agonizing over his sister Priscila Belfort, who disappeared on 9 January, Vitor won the fight in 49 seconds after a seam from his glove cut Couture's eye, leaving Couture with a corneal abrasion that prompted a referee stoppage. A third match between the two took place on 21 August 2004. Couture won via doctor stoppage after the third round, recapturing the title.

==== Belfort vs. Ortiz ====
His next fight in the UFC was against Tito Ortiz on 5 February 2005. The fight was Ortiz's last fight on his contract. Belfort had early success in the first round, landing his best punches when the fight was on the feet, although he was taken down late in the round and took some of Ortiz's best elbows. Belfort again had a strong start in the second but was taken down a second time and took damage from elbows late in the round. Both fighters were exhausted by round 3; Belfort was too tired to land a single punch and was taken down and dominated, with Ortiz again landing damaging elbows. After a hard-fought battle, Belfort lost a close split decision: some people, including then UFC Light heavyweight champion, Chuck Liddell believed he deserved to win the first as well as the second round, due to his octagon control and breaking Ortiz's nose with punches, early in round one.

=== Strikeforce ===
Vitor then fought in Strikeforce for a rematch with Alistair Overeem, in which Belfort was defeated via unanimous decision.

=== Return to Pride and steroid controversy ===
At Pride 32: The Real Deal on 21 October 2006, Belfort lost a unanimous decision to Pride Welterweight Champion Dan Henderson. After the fight, Belfort tested positive for an illegal substance, 4-hydroxytestosterone. In his defense, Belfort argued that he had purchased an over the counter supplement which contained 4-Hydroxytestosterone. Belfort also explained that he may have received 4-Hydroxytestosterone as the result of rehabilitative injections given to him by Brazilian endocrinologist Dr. Rodrigo M. Greco after his surgery to repair a torn meniscus in his knee in the summer of 2006. The Nevada State Athletic Commission eventually received a statement from Dr. Greco stating that he did give Belfort post-surgical injections containing testosterone. While conceding that Belfort may have not known about the testosterone, the NSAC explained that even if Belfort was given injections by a medical practitioner who did not inform him that they contained anabolic steroids, it would still be a violation of the banned substances policy. On 21 December 2006, he was suspended for nine months from the date of the hearing and fined $10,000.

=== Cage Rage ===
Vítor Belfort defeated Ivan Serati by TKO at Cage Rage 21 in England on 21 April 2007. He defeated James Zikic on 22 September 2007, at Cage Rage 23 to claim the Cage Rage light heavyweight title in a unanimous decision. He entered the fight with a broken hand and during the fight threw minimal punches and utilized takedowns and ground and pound techniques.

=== Affliction ===
Vítor spent a brief time training for his Affliction fight against Terry Martin with Chute Boxe in Brazil. However, he completed his preparation for the fight at Xtreme Couture in Las Vegas. Randy Couture and Shawn Tompkins helped train him for the fight, in which he achieved a second-round KO by landing a flying knee and following up with an uppercut straight-left combination.

After the fight, Couture said Belfort was thinking about moving to Las Vegas and training at Xtreme Couture full-time.

Belfort's next fight was slated to be against Matt Lindland at the second Affliction event, however, he was forced to pull out due to a hand injury sustained during the Terry Martin fight. The second Affliction event was postponed anyway and rescheduled for January 2009, enabling Vítor to fight on that card.

With rumours of a possible bout with reigning Dream Middleweight Grand Prix winner Gegard Mousasi circulating, it was announced that Vítor would finally fight Lindland at Affliction: Day of Reckoning. Lindland was originally slated to fight Renato Sobral at a catchweight, but promoters of Affliction preferred the Belfort vs. Lindland fight at Middleweight. The fight ended in a KO at thirty-seven seconds, as Belfort delivered a strong left to Lindland's jaw and followed up with four unanswered power shots as he hit the ground.

=== Third UFC run ===
During a press conference, Dana White announced that the UFC had re-signed Belfort to a contract. His first match was against Rich Franklin at a catchweight of 195 lbs, headlining UFC 103, which he won by knockout three minutes and two seconds into the first round. This fight earned him a $65,000 Knockout of the Night award.

==== Middleweight bouts, & Title shot ====
Belfort was expected to face Anderson Silva for the UFC Middleweight Championship on 2 January 2010, at UFC 108. However, Silva's manager, Ed Soares, announced that Silva would not be fully recovered from his injury by that time, so the fight was postponed. Belfort was again slated to fight Silva on 6 February 2010, at UFC 109 and 10 April 2010, at UFC 112, respectively, but both fights were canceled because of a surgery for Silva and an injury suffered by Belfort. Belfort was scheduled to fight Yushin Okami at UFC 122. However, Dana White tweeted Belfort would instead challenge Silva at UFC 126 for the belt. Belfort lost by knockout after getting hit with a front kick to the face and taking two punches after falling to the mat.

Belfort made his return at UFC 133 against Yoshihiro Akiyama. Belfort initially thought the UFC would try to put him on the card at UFC 134 in Brazil, but the fight with Akiyama came together to help bolster the card in Philadelphia. Belfort contracted Hepatitis A in April, shortly after accepting the fight, but his representative, Pedro Lima, said that it would not jeopardize the bout with Akiyama. Belfort was successful in his return, winning the fight by knockout one minute and fifty-two seconds into the first round. This fight earned him another Knockout of the Night award.

Belfort was briefly linked to a matchup with Cung Le, expected to take place on 19 November 2011, at UFC 139. However, Belfort was removed from the bout due to injury and replaced by Wanderlei Silva.

==== Missed weight bout ====
Belfort faced Anthony Johnson on 14 January 2012, at UFC 142. During the UFC 142 weigh ins, Johnson came in 11 pounds over the 186 lb weight allowance and was fined 20 percent of his earnings. Belfort requested that Johnson not weigh more than 205 lbs the day of the fight. The UFC had Johnson weigh in a second time. Johnson officially weighed in at 204 lbs on fight day, and the fight with Belfort proceeded as scheduled, with Belfort winning via rear naked choke in the first round, his first submission win in over a decade.

==== The Ultimate Fighter: Brazil ====
Belfort was selected to coach The Ultimate Fighter: Brazil against Wanderlei Silva. The rematch between Belfort and Silva was expected to take place on 23 June 2012, at UFC 147. However, on 27 May 2012, Belfort was forced to pull out of the bout, citing a broken hand in training, and replaced by Rich Franklin.

In a 2007 interview, Belfort expressed disinterest in actually fighting Wanderlei Silva. He told Fighters Only magazine, "I guess Wanderlei will be able to fight in October but I only want that my next bout that accredits me to dispute the belt. I don’t know, maybe Michael Bisping. I was only defeated once recently, by Anderson Silva, and all my wins were very convincing." He further stated, "I don’t know how long I will stay in this division. I wanted to do more two or three fights. If my body will no longer permit this big weight cutting, I will go up (to 205 lbs). I am not afraid of Jon Jones or somebody else... It's not for me to choose my opponents."

==== Third Light heavyweight title shot ====
Belfort was expected to face Alan Belcher on 13 October 2012, at UFC 153. However, he replaced Lyoto Machida in a bout against Jon Jones at UFC 152 for the UFC Light Heavyweight Championship after Machida rejected the offer due to lack of time to train before the fight. Despite almost submitting Jones via armbar in the first round, he was dominated during the remainder of the bout and submitted via keylock at 0:54 of the fourth round.

==== Return to Middleweight ====
Belfort returned to face Michael Bisping on 19 January 2013, at UFC on FX: Belfort vs. Bisping, winning via TKO due to a head kick and punches at 1:27 of the second round. Belfort injured Bispings right eye with his head kick. This fight earned him another Knockout of the Night award.

Belfort faced the final Strikeforce Middleweight Champion and promotional newcomer Luke Rockhold on 18 May 2013, at UFC on FX: Belfort vs. Rockhold. He won the fight by a spinning wheel kick knockout in the first round. This fight earned him another Knockout of the Night award.

==== Return to Light heavyweight ====
Belfort faced Dan Henderson at light heavyweight in a rematch on 9 November 2013, at UFC Fight Night 32. Belfort defeated Henderson via first-round knockout to become the first person to defeat Henderson via strikes. The win also earned Belfort his fifth Knockout of the Night bonus award.

==== Middleweight return ====
Belfort was expected to face UFC middleweight champion Chris Weidman at UFC 173. However, Belfort chose to withdraw from the fight following the Nevada State Athletic Commission's ban on exemptions for testosterone replacement therapy and was replaced by Lyoto Machida. Subsequently, Belfort revealed that he had failed a random drug test in February, due to elevated levels of testosterone.

Belfort was expected to face Chael Sonnen on 5 July 2014, at UFC 175 as a replacement for Wanderlei Silva. However, Sonnen failed a random drug test and was removed from the bout. The following day it was announced by MMA writer Kevin Iole that Belfort had also been removed from the card due to the inability of the UFC to find him a new opponent.

Belfort was expected to face Weidman on 6 December 2014, at UFC 181. However, on 22 September, it was announced that Weidman had suffered a broken hand and the bout was again rescheduled to take place on 28 February 2015, at UFC 184. In turn, on 30 January 2015, the UFC announced that Weidman had pulled out of the bout again, citing an injury he sustained in training. The bout with Weidman eventually took place on 23 May 2015, at UFC 187. Belfort found initial success with a flurry of punches early in the opening of the first round, but Weidman survived them, secured a takedown, achieved the mount position and defeated Belfort via TKO due to punches.

Belfort faced Dan Henderson in a rubber match at UFC Fight Night 77 on 7 November 2015. He again defeated Henderson via a combination of head kick and punches. The win also earned Belfort his first and only Performance of the Night bonus award.

Belfort next faced Ronaldo Souza on 14 May 2016, at UFC 198 He lost the fight via TKO in the first round.

A long discussed fight with Gegard Mousasi took place on 8 October 2016, at UFC 204. Belfort lost the fight via TKO in the second round.

Belfort faced Kelvin Gastelum on 11 March 2017, at UFC Fight Night 106. He lost the fight via a combination of punches in the first round resulting in a K.O. However, Gastelum subsequently tested positive for marijuana and the result was overturned to a No Contest.

Belfort faced Nate Marquardt on 3 June 2017, at UFC 212. He won the fight by controversial unanimous decision, his first decision win in nearly a decade.

Belfort was expected to face Uriah Hall on 14 January 2018, at UFC Fight Night: Stephens vs. Choi. However, on 13 January 2018, it was announced that Hall did not make it to the weigh-in because he fainted and suffered seizures from weight-cutting practices and the bout was cancelled.

Belfort faced Lyoto Machida on 12 May 2018, at UFC 224. He lost the fight after being knocked out by a front kick to the face. Following the fight, Belfort announced his retirement from MMA competition.

On Monday 17 December 2018, Vitor Belfort announced his intentions to return from retirement on the Helwani Show.

==== Hall of Fame ====
During UFC 315's broadcast in May 2025, Belfort was announced as the next "pioneer wing" UFC Hall of Fame inductee during International Fight Week festivities in Las Vegas this June.

=== ONE Championship ===
On 1 March 2019, it was reported that Belfort signed by ONE Championship. On 28 April 2020, Belfort announced that he will be making his promotional debut against Alain Ngalani. Belfort has since parted ways with ONE Championship without fighting for the promotion.

== Grappling ==
=== ADCC Championships ===
In 2001 Belfort participated in the ADCC championships, in their Absolute division. Prior to that competition he had already faced Hiroki Fukuda, winning by submission, and Mark Robinson, losing by points. In the championship Belfort faced Genki Sudo, winning by points, Ricco Rodriguez, winning by points, Ricardo Arona in the semi-final, losing by points and finally in the 3rd place fight defeating Ricardo Almeida by advantage after Almeida was unable to continue due to an injury to his knee, winning the bronze medal.

== Boxing career ==
=== Neves vs. Belfort ===
On 11 April 2006, Belfort made his professional boxing debut against Josemario Neves. Belfort won by TKO within the first minute after knocking his opponent down three times. This was his first venture into the sport of professional boxing.

Belfort had expressed a desire to return to professional boxing, stating in 2008 that he was interested in talking with Golden Boy Promotions regarding a deal. In 2010, in response to former IBA Heavyweight Champion James Toney's challenge to fight an MMA fighter in the boxing ring, Belfort expressed interest in representing the sport of MMA against Toney in a 6-round professional match. James Toney, however, went on to be defeated in the UFC Octagon by Randy Couture at UFC 118.

=== Holyfield vs. Belfort ===
In early June 2021, Triller announced that Belfort would face YouTuber Michael "The Real Tarzann" Holston in a professional boxing bout on 19 June 2021. However, the bout was cancelled for unknown reasons.

On 17 June 2021, it was reported that Belfort had agreed to an exhibition boxing match with former six-division boxing world champion Oscar De La Hoya in September 2021, which will be promoted by Triller. In July, news surfaced that the bout was changed to a professional boxing bout and was set to take place on 11 September 2021.

On 3 September, De La Hoya announced that he would not be fighting Belfort due to contracting COVID-19. In a message to his fans, he stated that he was fully vaccinated and receiving hospital treatment. In turn, it was announced that former heavyweight champion Evander Holyfield will be stepping in to face Belfort and that the event was being moved from California to Florida. Belfort won the exhibition match via technical knockout.

=== Rahman Jr. vs. Belfort ===
On 27 August 2022, DAZN announced that Belfort would be boxing professional heavyweight Hasim Rahman Jr. in the main event of MF & DAZN: X Series 002 on 15 October 2022, in Sheffield, England. The bout was postponed to MF & DAZN: X Series 003 on 19 November 2022, and was expected to take place at the Moody Center in Austin, Texas. Belfort withdrew from the fight after testing positive for COVID-19

=== Belfort vs. Jacare ===
Belfort was booked to compete against fellow MMA veteran Ronaldo 'Jacare' Souza in a professional boxing match at Gamebred Boxing 4 on 1 April 2023. Belfort defeated Jacare via unanimous decision.

== Personal life ==
Belfort was born on 1 April 1977, in Rio de Janeiro to a French-Brazilian father and a Greek-Brazilian mother. He is married to Joana Prado, with whom he has three children. They started dating in 2000 and broke up, but reunited during a reality show in 2002. The same year, Belfort appeared with Joana when she was photographed for the Brazilian edition of Playboy.

On 9 January 2004, Belfort's sister, Priscila, disappeared and the relatives received no information about her. In August 2007, a woman identified as Elaine Paiva confessed that she participated in her kidnapping and killing, and that she was kidnapped to pay off a four thousand dollar debt Paiva had with drug dealers. Paiva was arrested along with three others alleged to be involved in the kidnapping. The group allegedly buried her body in the woods in Rio de Janeiro where police conducted searches, but her remains have never been found. Her family however does not accept this version of events, and believes that Priscila is still alive somewhere. Belfort still maintains a missing page on the Brazilian version of his website.

Belfort speaks Portuguese, English, and Spanish. He is a devout Christian. Belfort believes the most important key to his success and longevity in the sport is that he is happy with what he does. "I just thank God every day. I’m happy. I’m healthy. Bottom line is it's just the way you treat life and life will treat you back. Make sure you’re happy with whatever is going on in your life. I think the key of life is just be happy with what's in front of you and the decision of my life is under God and God knows what's best for me." Belfort also appeared in a testimonial video on I Am Second, in which he shares his story of his faith in Jesus Christ.

Belfort's autobiography Vitor Belfort: Lições de garra, fé e sucesso was published by Thomas Nelson Brazil in 2012.

Belfort appears in the video for the song "I'm Down" by The Almost.

On 26 April 2018, Belfort became a naturalized American citizen.

Belfort's son, Davi Belfort, is an American football quarterback who was a four-star recruit out of high school. In 2023, he committed to playing college football at Virginia Tech, he is currently playing at University of Central Florida (UCF)

== Championships and accomplishments ==
=== Mixed martial arts ===
- Ultimate Fighting Championship
  - UFC Hall of Fame (Pioneer wing, Class of 2025)
  - UFC Light Heavyweight Championship (One time)
  - UFC 12 Heavyweight Tournament Championship
  - Knockout of the Night (Five times) vs. Rich Franklin, Yoshihiro Akiyama, Michael Bisping, Luke Rockhold and Dan Henderson 1
  - Performance of the Night (One time) vs. Dan Henderson 2
  - UFC Encyclopedia Awards
    - Fight of the Night (Three times) vs. Randy Couture 1, Chuck Liddell and Tito Ortiz
    - Knockout of the Night (Four times) vs. Scott Ferrozzo, Tank Abbott, Wanderlei Silva and Marvin Eastman
      - Most Encyclopedia Knockout of the Night Awards (4)
      - Most combined Encyclopedia/Official Knockout of the Night Awards in UFC history (9)
  - Tied (Max Holloway) for third most knockouts in UFC history (12)
  - Tied (Jim Miller) for most first-round finishes in UFC history (13)
    - Tied (Terrance McKinney) for second most sub-minute finishes in UFC history (4) (behind Anthony Johnson)
  - Most first-round knockouts in UFC history (11)
    - One of five fighters (Jared Cannonier, Conor McGregor, Robert Whittaker & Max Holloway) to have knockout victories in three different weight classes
  - Tied (Anderson Silva & Vicente Luque) for seventh most finishes in UFC history (14)
  - Youngest UFC tournament winner (19 years, 313 days)
  - Second youngest fighter to win five UFC bouts (21 years) (behind Raul Rosas Jr.)
  - UFC.com Awards
    - 2005: Ranked #3 Fight of the Year vs. Tito Ortiz
    - 2013: Ranked #3 Fighter of the Year, Half-Year Awards: Best Fighter of the 1HY, Ranked #2 Knockout of the Year vs. Dan Henderson 2 & Ranked #6 Knockout of the Year vs. Luke Rockhold
- Cage Rage Championships
  - Cage Rage World Light heavyweight Championship (1 time)
- World MMA Awards
  - 2013 Knockout of the Year vs. Luke Rockhold at UFC on FX: Belfort vs. Rockhold
- Sherdog
  - 2013 All-Violence First Team
- MMA Junkie
  - 2013 #2 Ranked Fighter of the Year
- Bleacher Report
  - 2013 #3 Ranked Fighter of the Year

=== Submission grappling ===
- ADCC Submission Wrestling World Championship
  - ADCC 2001 Absolute division – Bronze medal

== Mixed martial arts record ==
Professional record breakdown
41 matches	26 wins	14 losses
By knockout	18	7
By submission	3	2
By decision	5	5
No contests	1	

Res.	Record	Opponent	Method	Event	Date	Round	Time	Location	Notes
Loss	26–14 (1)	Lyoto Machida	KO (front kick)	UFC 224	12 May 2018	2	1:00	Rio de Janeiro, Brazil	Belfort announced his retirement after the fight.
Win	26–13 (1)	Nate Marquardt	Decision (unanimous)	UFC 212	3 June 2017	3	5:00	Rio de Janeiro, Brazil	
NC	25–13 (1)	Kelvin Gastelum	NC (overturned)	UFC Fight Night: Belfort vs. Gastelum	11 March 2017	1	3:52	Fortaleza, Brazil	Originally a TKO (punches) win for Gastelum; overturned after he tested positive for a marijuana metabolite.
Loss	25–13	Gegard Mousasi	TKO (punches)	UFC 204	8 October 2016	2	2:43	Manchester, England	
Loss	25–12	Ronaldo Souza	TKO (punches)	UFC 198	14 May 2016	1	4:38	Curitiba, Brazil	
Win	25–11	Dan Henderson	KO (punches)	UFC Fight Night: Belfort vs. Henderson 3	7 November 2015	1	2:07	São Paulo, Brazil	Performance of the Night.
Loss	24–11	Chris Weidman	TKO (punches)	UFC 187	23 May 2015	1	2:53	Las Vegas, Nevada, United States	For the UFC Middleweight Championship.
Win	24–10	Dan Henderson	KO (head kick)	UFC Fight Night: Belfort vs. Henderson 2	9 November 2013	1	1:17	Goiânia, Brazil	Light Heavyweight bout. Knockout of the Night.
Win	23–10	Luke Rockhold	KO (spinning heel kick and punches)	UFC on FX: Belfort vs. Rockhold	18 May 2013	1	2:32	Jaraguá do Sul, Brazil	Knockout of the Night.
Win	22–10	Michael Bisping	TKO (head kick and punches)	UFC on FX: Belfort vs. Bisping	19 January 2013	2	1:27	São Paulo, Brazil	Return to Middleweight. Knockout of the Night.
Loss	21–10	Jon Jones	Submission (keylock)	UFC 152	22 September 2012	4	0:54	Toronto, Ontario, Canada	For the UFC Light Heavyweight Championship.
Win	21–9	Anthony Johnson	Submission (rear-naked choke)	UFC 142	14 January 2012	1	4:49	Rio de Janeiro, Brazil	Catchweight (197 lb) bout; Johnson missed weight.
Win	20–9	Yoshihiro Akiyama	KO (punches)	UFC 133	6 August 2011	1	1:52	Philadelphia, Pennsylvania, United States	Knockout of the Night.
Loss	19–9	Anderson Silva	KO (front kick and punches)	UFC 126	5 February 2011	1	3:25	Las Vegas, Nevada, United States	For the UFC Middleweight Championship.
Win	19–8	Rich Franklin	TKO (punches)	UFC 103	19 September 2009	1	3:02	Dallas, Texas, United States	Catchweight (195 lbs) bout. Knockout of the Night.
Win	18–8	Matt Lindland	KO (punches)	Affliction: Day of Reckoning	24 January 2009	1	0:37	Anaheim, California, United States	
Win	17–8	Terry Martin	KO (punches)	Affliction: Banned	19 July 2008	2	3:12	Anaheim, California, United States	Middleweight debut.
Win	16–8	James Zikic	Decision (unanimous)	Cage Rage 23	22 September 2007	3	5:00	London, England	Won the Cage Rage Light Heavyweight Championship.
Win	15–8	Ivan Serati	TKO (punches)	Cage Rage 21	21 April 2007	1	3:47	London, England	
Loss	14–8	Dan Henderson	Decision (unanimous)	PRIDE 32: The Real Deal	21 October 2006	3	5:00	Las Vegas, Nevada, United States	Belfort tested positive for elevated testosterone.
Win	14–7	Kazuo Takahashi	KO (punch)	PRIDE: Critical Countdown Absolute	1 July 2006	1	0:36	Saitama, Japan	
Loss	13–7	Alistair Overeem	Decision (unanimous)	Strikeforce: Revenge	9 June 2006	3	5:00	San Jose, California, United States	Catchweight (210 lbs) bout.
Win	13–6	Antony Rea	KO (punches)	Cage Rage 14	3 December 2005	2	1:14	London, England	
Loss	12–6	Alistair Overeem	Submission (guillotine choke)	PRIDE: Total Elimination 2005	23 April 2005	1	9:36	Osaka, Japan	
Loss	12–5	Tito Ortiz	Decision (split)	UFC 51	5 February 2005	3	5:00	Las Vegas, Nevada, United States	
Loss	12–4	Randy Couture	TKO (doctor stoppage)	UFC 49	21 August 2004	3	5:00	Las Vegas, Nevada, United States	Lost the UFC Light Heavyweight Championship.
Win	12–3	Randy Couture	TKO (doctor stoppage)	UFC 46	31 January 2004	1	0:49	Las Vegas, Nevada, United States	Won the UFC Light Heavyweight Championship.
Win	11–3	Marvin Eastman	TKO (knees and punches)	UFC 43	6 June 2003	1	1:07	Las Vegas, Nevada, United States	
Loss	10–3	Chuck Liddell	Decision (unanimous)	UFC 37.5	22 June 2002	3	5:00	Las Vegas, Nevada, United States	Return to Light Heavyweight.
Win	10–2	Heath Herring	Decision (unanimous)	PRIDE 14: Clash of the Titans	27 May 2001	3	5:00	Yokohama, Japan	
Win	9–2	Bobby Southworth	Submission (rear-naked choke)	PRIDE 13: Collision Course	25 March 2001	1	4:09	Saitama, Japan	
Win	8–2	Daijiro Matsui	Decision (unanimous)	PRIDE 10: Return of the Warriors	27 August 2000	2	10:00	Saitama, Japan	
Win	7–2	Gilbert Yvel	Decision (unanimous)	PRIDE 9: New Blood	4 June 2000	2	10:00	Nagoya, Japan	
Loss	6–2	Kazushi Sakuraba	Decision (unanimous)	PRIDE 5	29 April 1999	2	10:00	Nagoya, Japan	Return to Heavyweight.
Win	6–1	Wanderlei Silva	TKO (punches)	UFC Brazil	16 October 1998	1	0:44	São Paulo, Brazil	Light Heavyweight debut.
Win	5–1	Joe Charles	Submission (armbar)	UFC Japan	21 December 1997	1	4:03	Yokohama, Japan	
Loss	4–1	Randy Couture	TKO (punches)	UFC 15	17 October 1997	1	8:16	Bay St. Louis, Mississippi, United States	UFC Heavyweight title eliminator.
Win	4–0	Tank Abbott	TKO (punches)	UFC 13	30 May 1997	1	0:52	Augusta, Georgia, United States	
Win	3–0	Scott Ferrozzo	TKO (punches)	UFC 12	7 February 1997	1	0:43	Dothan, Alabama, United States	Won the UFC 12 Heavyweight Tournament.
Win	2–0	Tra Telligman	TKO (cut)	UFC 12	7 February 1997	1	1:17	Dothan, Alabama, United States	UFC 12 Heavyweight Tournament Semifinal.
Win	1–0	Jon Hess	KO (punches)	SuperBrawl 2	11 October 1996	1	0:12	Honolulu, Hawaii, United States	

== Pay-per-view bouts ==
No.	Event	Fight	Date	Venue	City	PPV Buys
1.	UFC 46	Couture vs. Belfort 2	31 January 2004	Mandalay Bay Events Center	Las Vegas, Nevada, United States	80,000
2.	UFC 49	Belfort vs. Couture 3	21 August 2004	MGM Grand Garden Arena	Las Vegas, Nevada, United States	80,000
3.	UFC 51	Ortiz vs. Belfort	5 February 2005	Mandalay Bay Events Center	Las Vegas, Nevada, United States	105,000
4.	UFC 103	Franklin vs. Belfort	19 September 2009	American Airlines Center	Dallas, Texas, United States	375,000
5.	UFC 126	Silva vs. Belfort	5 February 2011	Mandalay Bay Events Center	Las Vegas, Nevada, United States	725,000
6.	UFC 152	Jones vs. Belfort	22 September 2012	Air Canada Centre	Toronto, Ontario, Canada	450,000
					Total:	1,790,000

== Boxing record ==
=== Professional ===
2 fights	2 wins	0 losses
By knockout	1	0
By decision	1	0

No.	Result	Record	Opponent	Type	Round, time	Date	Age	Location	Notes
2	Win	2–0	Ronaldo Souza	UD	6	1 Apr 2023	46 years, 0 days	Fiserv Forum, Milwaukee, Wisconsin, U.S.	
1	Win	1–0	Josemario Neves	KO	1 (4), 1:01	11 Apr 2006	29 years, 10 days	Antonio Balbino Gymnasyum, Salvador, Bahia, Brazil	

=== Exhibition ===
1 fight	1 win	0 losses
By knockout	1	0

No.	Result	Record	Opponent	Type	Round, time	Date	Age	Location	Notes
1	Win	1–0	Evander Holyfield	TKO	1 (8), 1:49	11 Sep 2021	44 years, 193 days	Seminole Hard Rock Hotel & Casino, Hollywood, Florida, U.S.	

== Submission grappling record ==
Result	Opponent	Method	Event	Date	Round	Time	Notes
Win	(Brazil) Ricardo Almeida	Technical Submission (Injury)	ADCC 2001 Absolute Division	2001			3rd Place Spot-Wins Bronze Medal.
Loss	(Brazil) Ricardo Arona	Points	ADCC 2001 Absolute	2001			Semi-Finals.
Win	(United States) Ricco Rodriguez	Points	ADCC 2001 Absolute	2001			Quarter-Finals.
Win	(Japan) Genki Sudo	Points	ADCC 2001 Absolute	2001			Opening Round.
Loss	(United States) Mark Robinson	Points	ADCC 2001 +99 kg	2001			Quarter-Finals.
Win	(Japan) Hiroki Fukuda	Submission (Rear-Naked Choke)	ADCC 2001 +99 kg	2001			Opening Round.

== See also ==
- List of male boxers
- List of male mixed martial artists
- List of mixed martial artists with professional boxing records
- List of multi-sport athletes

Awards and achievements
Preceded by Randy Couture	4th UFC Light heavyweight Champion; 31 January 2004 – 21 August 2004	Succeeded by Randy Couture
Preceded by Don Frye	UFC Heavyweight Tournament (UFC 12); 7 February 1997	Succeeded by Randy Couture
