= Bruce Beck =

American Sportscaster

- Born: Bruce David Beck; September 18, 1956 (age 69); Livingston, New Jersey, U.S.
- Education: Livingston High School , Ithaca College
- Occupation: Television journalist
- Agent(s): Sandy Montag, The Montag Group
- Notable credit(s): WNBC Sports-Anchor; News 4 NY (1997–present)
- Spouse: Janet
- Children: Jonathan and Michael
- Relatives: Mayor Doris Beck (Mother), Felix Beck (Father)
- Website: Website

Bruce David Beck (born September 18, 1956) is an American sportscaster who serves as the lead sports anchor at the NBC television network's New York flagship station, WNBC. He is also the host of Sports Final, WNBC's Sunday night sports show. Beck is the host and sideline reporter for New York Giants pre-season football. In November 2021, Broadcasting & Cable honored Bruce as the top local sports anchor in America.

Beck has covered a multitude of events for News 4 New York, including 5 Super Bowls, 3 NBA Finals, 6 Stanley Cup Finals, 7 World Series, The U.S. Open Tennis Championship, The U.S. Open Golf Championship, and The NCAA Final Four. In addition, Beck has covered 12 Olympics, with the most recent being the 2026 Winter Olympics in Milan, Italy.

Beck has hosted and contributed to a number of WNBC-TV specials including the live broadcast of the New York City Marathon, The Belmont Stakes, The U.S. Open Golf Championship and "Deja Blue", which preceded Super Bowl XLVI.

In addition, Beck has hosted the Sun America Sportsdesk and the Allstate Sports Update for NBC Sports and has served as a sideline reporter for the network's coverage of the NBA and WNBA on NBC. Beck has been a studio anchor for NBA-TV and is the host of the weekly Rutgers University basketball and football shows which air on MSG Network. He was one of the first play by play voices for the Ultimate Fighting Championship (UFC) from 1994 to 1997.

== Early life and education ==
Beck grew up in Livingston, New Jersey, where his mother Doris Beck twice served as mayor. She was the first female mayor of any Essex County municipality. He was a student athlete at Livingston High School, graduated in 1974 and was inducted into the school's hall of fame in 1993.

A graduate of Ithaca College in Ithaca, New York, Beck received a Bachelor of Science degree in 1978.

== Career ==
From 1982 to 1994, Beck was a staff broadcaster with the MSG Network. Among his many duties, he hosted the station's coverage of the Knicks, Rangers, and Yankees. He was the play-by-play announcer for college football and basketball, professional and Golden Gloves boxing and professional tennis. He hosted the Millrose Games, The Virginia Slims Championship, The National Horse Show, and the Lou Carnesecca Show.

From 1994 to 1997, Beck hosted "Sportstalk" and "Sports Images" on CN8, the Comcast Network. He also was the play-by-play voice of Atlantic 10 Conference Basketball and Hofstra University Football, while calling college basketball games for CBS Sports. He was the host of CBS' coverage of the Hambletonian and The American Championship Harness Series on ESPN. He was a play-by-play voice and host of Showtime Championship Boxing.

Beck was the play by play announcer for the Ultimate Fighting Championship from 1994 to 1997, calling UFC 4 through UFC 15 with partner and olympic gold medalist Jeff Blatnick.

Beck was hired by WNBC-TV in 1997 as the weekend sports anchor and weekday reporter. He became the lead sports anchor in 2009.

From 2000 to 2008, Beck was a studio anchor for NBA TV.

Beck began calling professional boxing in 1986 with MSG Network. He currently calls fights for ESPN+ and Top Rank Boxing.

Beck has also called the blow by blow for USA Network, Showtime Championship Boxing, and numerous international broadcasts. Most notably, Beck manned the headset for Evander Holyfield vs. Mike Tyson II on June 28, 1997.

From 2011 to 2013, Beck handled blow by blow duties for Epix (TV network). In 2015, he called the action for HBO2's boxing presentation from Macau. In 2016, Beck handled some blow by blow duties for Spike TV's Premier Boxing Champions and for Spike's Bellator Kickboxing.

Starting in 2017, Beck launched the Bruce Beck Sports Broadcasting Camp at Iona College in New Rochelle, New York. Beck, along with the top sportscasters and personalities in New York, teaches the fundamentals of the industry to the next generation of sports broadcasters. The camp concludes at Yankee Stadium or Citi Field, with kids calling the play-by-play of a live Yankees or Mets game. Every summer from 2002 to 2016, Beck, along with CBS Sports announcer Ian Eagle ran a similar camp at the Yogi Berra Museum and Learning Center in Montclair, New Jersey.

== Awards ==
Beck has been named New York State Sportscaster of the Year 9 times, including six years in a row from 2007 until 2012, by the National Sports Media Association.

Bruce was inducted into the MetroWest Jewish Sports Hall of Fame in 2008.

Beck was chosen by St. John's University to deliver the 2009 Commencement speech to its Staten Island Campus on May 16. He received an Honorary Doctor of Letters Degree.

In 2017, Ithaca College honored Beck with the Jessica Savitch Award of Distinction for Excellence in Journalism.

In November 2021, Broadcasting & Cable honored Beck as the top local sports anchor in America.

=== Emmys ===
Beck received the 2006 New York Emmy as Outstanding Sports Anchor. In 2011, Beck won a New York Sports Emmy for his interview with former Rutgers football player Eric Legrand. Overall, he has received eight New York Sports Emmys, one Mid-Atlantic Sports Emmy and three national Cable Ace Awards.

== Personal life ==
Bruce and his wife, Janet, currently reside in Westchester County, New York. He has two sons.

Each Thanksgiving, Beck and his family serve those in need at the St. John's Bread and Life Program, the largest soup kitchen in Brooklyn. In 2015, the Becks received the Johnny's Angel Award for their work in the St. John's community.
