= Doris Beck =

Doris Beck may refer to:

- Doris Beck (American politician) (1929–2020)
- Doris Beck (Liechtenstein politician) (born 1961)
