= Fist of Fear, Touch of Death =

- Directed by: Matthew Mallinson
- Written by: Ron Harvey; Matthew Mallinson
- Produced by: Terry Levene
- Starring: Bruce Lee; Fred Williamson; Adolph Caesar; Ron van Clief; Bill Louie; Aaron Banks
- Cinematography: John Hazard
- Edited by: Jeffrey D. Brown; Matthew Mallinson
- Distributed by: Aquarius Releasing
- Release date: 1980
- Running time: 90 minutes
- Country: United States
- Language: English
- Budget: $122,500
- Box office: $2 million

Fist of Fear, Touch of Death, also known as The Dragon and the Cobra, is a 1980 American martial arts film set at the "1979 World Karate Championships" at Madison Square Garden that will supposedly determine the "successor" to Bruce Lee. The film is hosted by Adolph Caesar. Bruce Lee was deceased before the film went into production, and any footage featuring Lee was taken from earlier films or television appearances. It is considered to be an exploitation film or Bruceploitation, exploiting Bruce Lee's popularity, and the mystique surrounding his death.

== Plot ==
TV reporter Adolph Caesar is outside Madison Square Garden before the start of a martial arts tournament that will apparently determine the "successor" to the legacy of Bruce Lee. He interviews martial arts promoter Aaron Banks, who says that Lee was actually killed by a kung fu move called "The Touch of Death." Banks describes the move as being effective in "three to four weeks." The segment contains a sequence of flashbacks to Bruce Lee ostensibly supporting Banks' assertion.

From inside Madison Square Garden, Caesar discusses the competitors. He talks about the legacy of Bruce Lee, and shows what he describes as "interview footage" he did with Lee shortly before his death. Then, Caeser flashes back to earlier in the day, where action star Fred Williamson seen having to traverse through a number of obstacles to get to the tournament while being repeatedly mistaken for Harry Belafonte. Next, Ron van Clief is also profiled and interviewed. Van Clief is then seen saving a woman from four hoodlums in a New York park.

The middle section of the film is devoted to "The Bruce Lee Story," a chronicle of Bruce Lee's early years in China, where he is depicted as being "karate crazy," much to the dismay of his parents. The footage from this section of the story is from the 1957 Bruce Lee film Thunderstorm, which has also been redubbed. This act of the presentation purports that Lee was learning karate to live up to the legacy of his great-grandfather, who was "one of China's greatest Samurai masters." (China did not actually have samurai, as samurai are Japanese warriors.) The life of Lee's grandfather is also portrayed in this act at alternating points, in scenes lifted from Invincible Super Chan. Later, Lee leaves home and lands a career as an actor. This segues into a scene of Bill Louie, dressed as Kato from The Green Hornet, saving two female joggers from being raped by a gang near the World War II memorial in Battery Park in broad daylight. This segment ends after Louie apparently murders the last conscious gang member with a throwing star.

After Caesar announces the conclusion of "The Bruce Lee Story," the film transitions back to Madison Square Garden, where a number of performers are showcased. Caesar interviews Fred Williamson, who denounces the idea of a contest to determine Bruce Lee's successor.

The grande finale is devoted to a two-round kickboxing match, in which Louis Neglia reigns victorious. Adolph Caesar concludes the film with a final thought.

== Criticism ==
Fist of Fear, Touch of Death has been criticized for its nonfactual representation of Bruce Lee's life and its inaccurate portrayal of the culture and history of China. For example, karate and samurai are often referred to as Chinese, when in reality, they are Japanese. Some fans have expressed disappointment that Lee had no actual involvement in the film (which was released seven years after his death) despite the fact that his face is featured on its posters and DVD boxes.

From the Movies in the Attic website:

"It insults the intelligence of the viewer who has even mildly enjoyed a Bruce Lee movie. We hear Bruce Lee's grandpa was a samurai. (The fact that samurais were from Japan and Bruce Lee is Chinese notwithstanding) Just adds to the overall stupidity. Oh and then we get footage of Bruce Lee explaining to his mother that he beats people up because of his tradition of his samurai grandfather."

The Bruceploitation website called the film the worst Bruceploitation movie of all time.
