= Kvest =

- Directed by: Ivan Arkhipov
- Written by: Ivan Arkhipov; Gennadiy Kazachkov
- Produced by: Ivan Arkhipov
- Starring: Roman Kurtsyn; Oleg Taktarov; Margarita Abroskina; Maksim Lagashkin; Sergey Rost; Sergey Astakhov; Konstantin Solovyov; Galina Bokashevskaya
- Cinematography: Dmitry Pavlov; Anton Vasilyev
- Distributed by: Cinemaus Studio
- Release date: August 24, 2023
- Running time: 108 minutes
- Country: Russia
- Language: Russian

Kvest (Russian: Квест, lit. 'Quest') is a 2023 Russian teen adventure film directed by Ivan Arkhipov about the re-education of difficult teenagers. It stars Roman Kurtsyn and Oleg Taktarov. It is scheduled to be theatrically released on August 24, 2023.

== Plot ==
Teenagers from different walks of life end up in an unusual sports camp for the purpose of re-education. There they learn to find a common language in society and find themselves in various life situations where they need to make difficult decisions and act together and together. The guys learn to survive, and go through a lot of quests on the way to the house. These adventures will lead the heroes to the understanding that the main thing in life is not personal ambitions and a consumer attitude towards others, but friendship and mutual assistance.

== Cast ==
- Vlad Kalistratov as Andrey Loginov
- Demyan Dorozhenko as Igor Vasilchenko
- Dayana Gudz as Anya
- Roman Kurtsyn as Gogen
- Oleg Taktarov
- Margarita Abroskina as the Comet
- Maksim Lagashkin
- Sergey Rost as Andrey's father
- Sergey Astakhov as Igor's father
- Konstantin Solovyov as the camp director
- Galina Bokashevskaya as Igor's grandmother

== Production ==
Filming began at the end of August 2022 in the Leningrad Oblast and continued in Karelia.
