= Oleg Taktarov =

Russian actor and mixed martial arts fighter

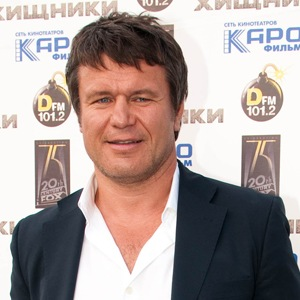
- Taktarov in 2010
- Born: Oleg Nikolaevich Taktarov; 26 August 1967 (age 59); Arzamas-16, Gorky Oblast, Russian SFSR, Soviet Union
- Native name: Оле́г Такта́ров
- Other names: The Russian Bear
- Nationality: Russian
- Height: 6 ft 0 in (183 cm)
- Weight: 210 lb (95 kg; 15 st 0 lb)
- Division: Heavyweight
- Stance: Orthodox
- Fighting out of: Gorky, Russia
- Rank: Master of Sport in Sambo; 3rd dan black belt in Judo; 4th dan black belt in Jujutsu
- Years active: 1989–1998, 2001, 2007–2008 (MMA) 1997–present (Acting) 2007, 2023 (Boxing)

Mixed martial arts record
- Total: 24
- Wins: 17
- By knockout: 2
- By submission: 14
- By decision: 1
- Losses: 5
- By knockout: 3
- By decision: 2
- Draws: 2

Other information
- Mixed martial arts record from Sherdog
- Last updated on: March 10, 2011

Oleg Nikolaevich Taktarov (Russian: Оле́г Никола́евич Такта́ров; born 26 August 1967) is a Russian actor and retired mixed martial artist. He was a practitioner of Sambo and Judo and competed in the Ultimate Fighting Championship and Pride Fighting Championships.

During his career Taktarov won the UFC 6 tournament, challenged Ken Shamrock for the UFC Superfight Championship and was runner up to Dan Severn for the Ultimate Ultimate 1995. He holds notable wins over Marco Ruas, Tank Abbott, Mark Kerr, and Anthony Macias.

Following his brief retirement from MMA in 1997, Taktarov began his acting career and has since made many appearances in both film and television in the US and Russia. He has appeared in films such as Bad Boys II (2003), National Treasure (2004) and Predators (2010).

== Early life ==
Taktarov is of mixed Mari and Russian background. He started his experience in martial arts at 12, when he took up both judo and sambo. He started competing in those disciplines during his obligatory military service, at one point also becoming a hand-to-hand instructor for the KGB, until he retired at 22 in order to become a businessman. However, according to Taktarov, in 1989 he would find himself attracted to a jacketed mixed martial arts event called Jujutsu Full Contact, whose four first editions he won in dominant fashion. He also trained in jujutsu around this time, becoming a four time European champion. In October 1993, Taktarov and a training partner participated in the White Dragon MMA tournament in Latvia, where he won his first three fights by finish. However he was forced to flee from the country due to political tensions. He would land in United States, as he planned to pursue a film acting career, though this would be delayed by his lack of fluency in English language.

== Mixed martial arts career ==
Originally travelling to North America, the goal of Taktarov was originally to become an actor but he decided to become a professional fighter in order to gain a visa extension. In order to get in touch with Hollywood actors, and having watched the Ultimate Fighting Championship event UFC 2, Taktarov contacted the Gracie Jiu-Jitsu Academy in 1994, offering himself to train Royce Gracie in sambo leglocks. Although he was accepted as a training partner after proving his skill against several instructors, he was ultimately rejected due to his inability to pay the fee. Taktarov next contacted the UFC management in order to participate himself for the prize money, being advised that he was already familiar with that kind of competition and had a chance of winning. He was finally accepted into the UFC 5 tournament in April, and would later find out that the Gracie family had previously pressed to keep him out of the UFC. A week before the event, Taktarov dislocated his knee, but he decided not to pull out of the tournament.

=== Ultimate Fighting Championship ===
Taktarov was billed in the event as "The Russian Bear," a stereotypical nickname invented by his manager, and hailed as a Sambo representative, as this was the most exotic martial art in Taktarov's background. However, he stood out for his friendly demeanor, showing an infectious smile to the camera while introducing himself instead of the intimidating faces and postures other fighters were striking. His first fight was against Kempo Karate expert Ernie Verdicia, whom Oleg quickly submitted by pulling guard, sweeping him between his strikes, and locking an arm triangle choke for the tapout. He advanced round to meet Greco-Roman wrestler Dan Severn, but Taktarov's injured knee limited his performance, already disadvantaged by 55 lbs. Severn took the Russian down, passed his guard and blocked him against the cage wall, where Taktarov was repeatedly hit with knee strikes and headbutts while he tried to look for submissions. As the strikes opened a deep cut on Oleg's face, the referee stopped the fight in Severn's favor.

After the event, Taktarov went to train with Ken Shamrock in his Lion's Den fighting team. He described this time as: "For a month Ken and I fought together. The guys who later became good fighters, like Frank Shamrock or Guy Mezger, were not any competition for me at the time. The only guy I trained with was Ken, and we had battles behind closed doors. Nobody was allowed to watch them."

Taktarov returned at UFC 6, whose first round saw him facing Wrestler and Judoka Dave Beneteau. Although Beneteau took Oleg down and stunned him momentarily with punches, Taktarov answered by scoring his own takedown and tapping him out with a guillotine choke in the scramble. His next bout was originally against Patrick Smith, but an injury forced the latter to be replaced by Anthony Macias, who shared promoter and training ground with Taktarov. The Russian submitted him in with another guillotine choke in nine seconds, becoming the fastest submission in UFC history in the process. The fighters were unusually booed by the crowd, who suspected the fight to be a work executed to ease Taktarov's way to the finals. In any case, Taktarov went to the main event of the night, being pitted against the much larger fighter Tank Abbott in what commentators called a "skill vs. strength" match. Both Taktarov and Abbott were already tired and dehydrated by the high altitude of Casper, Wyoming, where the event was taking place.

The bout was hard-fought, with Abbott dominating the grappling exchanges and scoring punches while Taktarov remained patient and counterattacked with a variety of strikes and submission attempts. After 17 minutes of back and forth action, with both fighters looking devoid of energy, Taktarov locked a rear naked choke for the tournament victory. He had to be taken to the hospital right after with an oxygen mask on. He was later quoted as, "when I went to the hospital after the fight, they said I barely had enough water in my system, only about one gallon."

Being the reigning tournament champion, Taktarov was set up to fight reigning UFC Champion Ken Shamrock in UFC 7 for the UFC Superfight Championship. Due to his friendship with Shamrock, Taktarov accepted the fight reluctantly and tried to find a way to win without hurting him, although he was unsure whether Shamrock would do the same. As with the previous fight, Taktarov displayed an important amount of toughness while defending from the bottom, spending most of the match laying defensively on his guard while receiving punishment. The fight had a 30-minute time limit and went into three minutes of overtime, but the result was the same, with Shamrock scoring strikes both standing and through his guard. As there was no judges, the fight finished as a draw.

Taktarov then entered the UFC's Ultimate Ultimate 1995 tournament. He rematched Dave Beneteau, who according to Taktarov came to the match having greased himself to difficult the Russian's grip. Unable to throw him, Taktarov resorted to a flying kneebar, and promptly transitioned it into an ankle lock to submit Beneteau. He then went to face Luta Livre exponent and highly regarded UFC 7 champion Marco Ruas. The match was lengthy and slow, with Taktarov trying repeatedly to take Ruas to the ground while the Brazilian caused damage with strikes and made Oleg bleed. After the time went out, however, Taktarov won the decision for his superior aggression during the match. Controversy arose when Ruas's manager Frederico Lapenda complained about the decision. Despite Taktarov being tired after the bout, he advanced round and lastly met Dan Severn in the finals in a rematch of their fight at UFC 5. The Russian clamped another leglock combination in the first few minutes, which he claimed Severn was going to tap out to before Taktarov was forced to release it out of fatigue. The Wrestler then scored headbutts and knee strikes from dominant positions until the end of the bout, including an overtime controlled by way of Boxing, which granted him the decision.

Taktarov ended his UFC career after Ultimate Ultimate, according to him because the management was focused on Shamrock over any other fighter. However, on 21 November 2003, at UFC 45, the UFC conducted a poll amongst the fans to determine the most popular fighters in the history of the UFC. The fans voted Oleg as one of the top 10 most popular fighters in the history of the UFC.

=== Post-UFC ===
After his UFC tenure, Taktarov competed for Japanese promotion Pancrase, where he lost a decision by points to Ryushi Yanagisawa. He then moved to Brazil, where he defeated Joe Charles by submission in World Vale Tudo Championship. There were next talks about a rematch with Marco Ruas, which Taktarov accepted. He even entertained the idea to crash the match with a ringside brawl, which would attract attention by the news media and allow them both to host an anticipated rubber match back in UFC. Ruas's management seemed to get into the idea of setting up a third fight, with his manager Lapenda even making Taktarov promise to fight entirely standing, but Ruas himself fought to win. With one minute left in the clock, Taktarov finally took Ruas down, but he allowed the bout to end in a draw. However, interest was little and the rubber match never happened.

Taktarov returned from Brazil with a broken hand, only to find out his manager had put him on a fight against Renzo Gracie for Martial Arts Reality Superfighting in ten days notice. Come the match, Taktarov took Gracie down, but the anticipated grappling battle never took off. Taktarov's injured hand impeded him from grabbing an opportune leglock on Gracie, who capitalized on the lapse to fire an upkick that knocked down Taktarov. He tried to continue fighting, but the kick had opened a deep cut and the fight was stopped.

In 1997, Taktarov traveled back to Brazil to fight decorated ADCC grappler Sean Alvarez in the Pentagon Combat event. Despite Alvarez's size advantage, Taktarov knocked him out with newly polished striking skills. However, he got sent to another match in short notice, this time to Japan in the first ever Pride 1 show on 11 October 1997, facing Canadian heavyweight and UFC veteran Gary Goodridge. Taktarov suffered a frightening knockout loss, receiving strikes even after having been rendered unconscious, and had to be carried out of the arena in a stretcher. In one of his recent interviews he attributed Goodridge's victory to the peak of the anabolic steroid cycle that Goodridge allegedly went through prior to the fight. Taktarov further asserted that Goodridge's following performances (i.e. a string of losses) clearly indicated the downtrend of the steroid cycle.

On June 10, 2007, Taktarov faced Dolph Lundgren in a celebrity boxing match. He won the decision after five rounds.

On August 18, 2023, Taktarov faced Jeff Monson in a three round exhibition boxing match.

=== Return to mixed martial arts ===
Prior to making a successful comeback to the sport in 2007, Taktarov's last bout was in 2001. Taktarov announced in an online radio interview in November 2007 his plans to return to MMA with BodogFight. He won his debut match against John Marsh at 33 seconds into the 2nd round of the match by submission (kneebar). His last fight was against UFC 14 and UFC 15 heavyweight champion Mark Kerr, again winning by kneebar.

Taktarov retired from mixed martial arts with a record of 17 wins, 5 losses, and 2 draws.

== Submission grappling career ==
In 1998, Taktarov competed at the ADCC Submission Wrestling World Championship. He had previously trained with Brazilian jiu-jitsu practitioners Wallid Ismail, Ricardo Libório and Carlos Barreto. Taktarov fought a "superfight" with multiple champion Mário Sperry, who ultimately defeated Taktarov by points after passing his guard.

== Acting career ==
Taktarov in 2013

After temporarily retiring from mixed martial arts, Taktarov focused on his acting career and making his acting debut in the 1997, film Total Force where he played Boris. Later that same year he played a Russian Prison Guard in Air Force One sharing the screen with Harrison Ford. During the 2000s Taktarov continued to play villainous roles first portraying a Russian Mobster in 15 Minutes (2001) Josef Kuninskovich in Bad Boys II (2003) and Viktor Shippen in National Treasure (2004). He has since made other notable appearances in Righteous Kill, Dead Trigger, 44 Minutes: The North Hollywood Shoot-Out and the 2002 version of Rollerball. He also appeared in the first episode of season 3 of Alias entitled The Two and in the NCIS season 5 finale Judgment Day. He has also appeared in a few Russian productions, and was cast in a few releases from 2007, such as We Own the Night. Taktarov also released several instructional Sambo videos and has made an instructional video with Vladimir Vasiliev entitled Russian Mega Fighting. Taktarov more recently starred in Den of Thieves (as Alexi), Robert Rodriguez's franchise sequel, Predators, directed by Nimród Antal.

He is a leading actor in the Russian television series Ex-Wife.

In 2022, he played The Man from Moscow in the film The Man from Toronto. He had a starting role alongside Roman Kurtsyn in the 2023, teen adventure film Kvest.

== Selected filmography ==
Year	Title	Role	Notes
1997	Total Force	Boris	
1997	Absolute Force	Boris Checkniov	
1997	JAG	Russian Officer	Episode: "Cowboys & Cossacks"
1997	Air Force One	Russian Prison Guard #2	
1998	Counter Measures	Dmitri, The Engineer	
2001	15 Minutes	Oleg Razgul	
2001	My Friend's Love Affair	Boris	
2001	The Quickie	Boris	
2002	Rollerball	Oleg "Denny" Denekin	
2003	Red Serpent	Sergei Popov	
2003	Bad Boys II	Josef Kuninskovich	
2003	44 Minutes: The North Hollywood Shoot-Out	Emil Mătăsăreanu	TV film
2003	Alias	Gordei Volkov	Episode: "The Two"
2004	National Treasure	Viktor Shippen	
2005	Call me Genie	Ufa	
2005	Law of Corruption	Skala	
2005	To Hunt an Elk	Kamaz	12 episodes
2006	Shift	Fetisov	
2006	Miami Vice	Russian FBI Agent	
2007	We Own the Night	Pavel Lubyarsky	
2007	The Death and Life of Bobby Z	Oleg	
2007	Rockaway	Ivan	
2007	A Second Before...	Oleg, The Trainer	
2008	Montana	Nikolai	
2008	NCIS	Viggo Dratnyev	Episode: "Judgment Day: Part I & II"
2008	Righteous Kill	Yevgeny Mugalat	
2010	Predators	Nikolai	
2011	Generation P	Vovchik	
2011	Battlefield 3	Dmitri "Dima" Mayakovsky	Video game
2013	Officer Down	Oleg Emelyanenko	
2013	Reach Me	Man In Park	
2013	Viy	Gritsko	
2017	Battle Drone	Grigori Romanov	
2017	Dead Trigger	Lieutenant Martinov	
2018	Den of Thieves	Alexi	
2022	The Man from Toronto	"The Man from Moscow"	
2023	The Machine	Train Igor	
2023	Kvest		

== Championships and accomplishments ==
- Ultimate Fighting Championship
  - UFC 5 tournament semi-finalist
    - First Russian UFC champion
  - UFC 6 tournament winner
  - UFC Viewer's Choice Awardee (one of ten)
  - Ultimate Ultimate 1995 runner-up
  - UFC Encyclopedia Awards
    - Fight of the Night (Two times) vs. Ernie Verdicia and Tank Abbott
    - Submission of the Night (Two times) vs. Ernie Verdicia and Dave Beneteau
- Iron Gladiators
  - 1994 Iron Gladiators Competition winner (twice)

== Mixed martial arts record ==
Professional record breakdown
24 matches	17 wins	5 losses
By knockout	2	3
By submission	14	0
By decision	1	2
Draws	2	

Res.	Record	Opponent	Method	Event	Date	Round	Time	Location	Notes
Win	17–5–2	Mark Kerr	Submission (kneebar)	YAMMA Pit Fighting	April 11, 2008	1	1:55	Atlantic City, New Jersey, United States	
Win	16–5–2	John Marsh	Submission (kneebar)	BodogFIGHT: USA vs. Russia	November 30, 2007	2	0:33	Moscow, Russia	
Win	15–5–2	Aaron Salinas	Submission (armbar)	Total Kombat	May 13, 2001	1	1:24	McAllen, Texas, United States	
Win	14–5–2	Moti Horenstein	Submission (kneebar)	National Freesparring	February 21, 1998	1	3:24	Almaty, Kazakhstan	
Win	13–5–2	Mick Tierney	Submission (kneebar)	National Freesparring	February 21, 1998	1	3:58	Almaty, Kazakhstan	
Loss	12–5–2	Gary Goodridge	KO (punch)	Pride 1	October 11, 1997	1	4:57	Tokyo, Japan	
Win	12–4–2	Sean Alvarez	KO (punches)	Pentagon Combat	September 27, 1997	1	0:52	Brazil	
Win	11–4–2	Chuck Kim	Submission (guillotine choke)	World Fighting Federation	February 24, 1997	1	0:22	Birmingham, Alabama, United States	
Loss	10–4–2	Renzo Gracie	KO (upkick and punch)	Martial Arts Reality Superfighting	November 22, 1996	1	1:02	Birmingham, Alabama, United States	
Draw	10–3–2	Marco Ruas	Draw	World Vale Tudo Championship 2	November 10, 1996	1	31:12	Brazil	
Win	10–3–1	Joe Charles	Submission (kneebar)	World Vale Tudo Championship 1	August 14, 1996	1	4:42	Tokyo, Japan	
Loss	9–3–1	Ryushi Yanagisawa	Decision (lost points)	Pancrase - Truth 5	May 16, 1996	1	15:00	Tokyo, Japan	
Loss	9–2–1	Dan Severn	Decision (unanimous)	Ultimate Ultimate 1995	December 16, 1995	1	30:00	Denver, Colorado, United States	
Win	9–1–1	Marco Ruas	Decision (unanimous)	Ultimate Ultimate 1995	December 16, 1995	1	18:00	Denver, Colorado, United States	
Win	8–1–1	Dave Beneteau	Submission (achilles hold)	Ultimate Ultimate 1995	December 16, 1995	1	1:15	Denver, Colorado, United States	
Draw	7–1–1	Ken Shamrock	Draw	UFC 7	September 8, 1995	1	33:00	Buffalo, New York, United States	For the UFC Superfight Championship.
Win	7–1	Tank Abbott	Submission (rear-naked choke)	UFC 6	July 14, 1995	1	17:47	Casper, Wyoming, United States	Won the UFC 6 Tournament.
Win	6–1	Anthony Macias	Submission (guillotine choke)	UFC 6	July 14, 1995	1	0:09	Casper, Wyoming, United States	UFC 6 Tournament Semifinals. Fastest submission in UFC history.
Win	5–1	Dave Beneteau	Submission (guillotine choke)	UFC 6	July 14, 1995	1	0:57	Casper, Wyoming, United States	UFC 6 Tournament Quarterfinals.
Loss	4–1	Dan Severn	TKO (cut)	UFC 5	April 7, 1995	1	4:21	Charlotte, North Carolina, United States	UFC 5 Tournament Semifinals.
Win	4–0	Ernie Verdicia	Submission (choke)	UFC 5	April 7, 1995	1	2:23	Charlotte, North Carolina, United States	UFC 5 Tournament Quarterfinals.
Win	3–0	Maxim Kuzin	Submission (choke)	White Dragon: Day Three	October 23, 1993	1	1:11	Riga, Latvia	
Win	2–0	Artur Almaev	TKO (corner stoppage)	White Dragon: Day Two	October 22, 1993	1	4:25	Riga, Latvia	
Win	1–0	Vaskas Hilma	Submission (choke)	White Dragon: Day Two	October 22, 1993	1	0:24	Riga, Latvia	

== Exhibition boxing record ==
1 fight	1 win	0 losses
By decision	1	0

No.	Result	Record	Opponent	Type	Round, time	Date	Age	Location	Notes
1	Win	1–0	Dolph Lundgren	UD	5	Jun 10, 2007	39 years and 288 day	Luzhniki Small Sports Arena, Moscow, Russia	

== Submission grappling record ==
Result	Opponent	Method	Event	Date	Round	Time	Notes
Loss	(Brazil) Mário Sperry	Decision (unanimous)	ADCC 1998	1998	1	N/A	
Loss	(Brazil) Bueau Hershberger	Decision (unanimous)	ADCC 1998	1998	1	10:00	
Win	(United Arab Emirates) Hani Madi	Decision (unanimous)	ADCC 1998	1998	1	10:00	

== See also ==
- List of male mixed martial artists

Preceded by Dan Severn	UFC 6 Tournament winner July 14, 1995	Succeeded by Marco Ruas
