= Joe Son =

American convicted felon (born 1970)

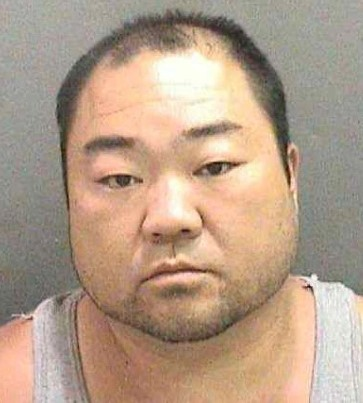
- Mugshot of Son in 2008
- Born: Son Hyungmin; November 20, 1970 (age 55); Gwangju, South Jeolla Province, South Korea
- Citizenship: United States
- Occupations: Actor; mixed martial artist; kickboxer; professional wrestler
- Years active: 1993–2008
- Criminal information
- Status: Incarcerated at Richard J. Donovan Correctional Facility, San Diego County
- Convictions: Felony vandalism, torture, voluntary manslaughter, sexual assault
- Penalty: Life imprisonment
- Martial arts career
- Other names: Iron Ball
- Height: 5 ft 4 in (1.63 m)
- Weight: 238 lb (108 kg; 17.0 st)
- Division: Heavyweight
- Fighting out of: Las Vegas, Nevada, U.S.
- Team: Lord's Gym
- Years active: 1994–2002

Kickboxing record
- Total: 1
- Wins: 0
- Losses: 1

Mixed martial arts record
- Total: 4
- Wins: 0
- Losses: 4
- By knockout: 2
- By submission: 2

Other information
- Mixed martial arts record from Sherdog

Korean name
- Hangul: 손형민
- RR: Son Hyeongmin
- MR: Son Hyŏngmin

Joseph Hyungmin Son (Korean: 손형민; born November 20, 1970) is a convicted felony rapist, former American actor, and former UFC fighter. He competed for the Ultimate Fighting Championship and K-1 Kickboxing during his combat sports career. As an actor, he was best known for his appearance in the spy comedy film Austin Powers: International Man of Mystery (1997). In martial arts, he is best known for his appearance at UFC 4, where he lost a match by submission after repeatedly being punched in the groin by Keith Hackney, a move which was legal at the time.

In 2008, he was arrested in connection to a 1990 sexual assault after DNA evidence linked him to the crime. In 2011, he was found guilty and sentenced to seven years to life in prison in California. While incarcerated, he was convicted of beating his cell mate to death and was sentenced to an additional 27 years for voluntary manslaughter.

== Early life ==
Son was born in Gwangju, South Korea. He moved to the US at an early age. He attended Cypress High School in Cypress, California with Scott Aukerman.

== Mixed martial arts career ==
Son was a mixed martial arts fighter and retired with a record of 0–4. Though he had appeared before in Ultimate Fighting Championship's UFC 3 in 1994 as Kimo Leopoldo's cornerman, Son had his proper debut at the UFC 4 event. He was pitted against Keith Hackney (a wrestling-trained Kenpo Karate fighter), whom Son outweighed by 30 pounds, but was seven inches shorter. Son carried a large cross to the ring but struggled under its weight. Although Son placed Hackney in a chokehold, his opponent escaped and punched Son repeatedly in the groin, which was legal under the rules of the event. Hackney then choked Son to earn the victory when Son tapped out.

After his fight in UFC, Son competed in a match for the K-1 Kickboxing federation, facing established star Nobuaki Kakuda. The much heavier Son initially led the pace with body shots and knees, scoring a mild knockdown by right hook, but he was eventually knocked out by Kakuda via high kick and punches.

In 2002, Son debuted for Japanese promotion PRIDE Fighting Championships, fighting Takada Dojo exponent Yusuke Imamura at the PRIDE The Best Vol.2. He infamously wore a leopard thong with the PRIDE logo and sported eye makeup, as well as a bowler hat at his entrance, and hugged Imamura during the staredown. The bout was short, and Son quit after he was taken down and almost slid out of the ring, claiming an elbow injury.

On April 12, 2002, Son also took part in Xtreme Pankration 2, wherein he faced Joe Moreira. After a brief exchange of strikes, Moreira landed a hit which drew blood, and Son then refused to continue fighting, and the fight was called. The result was officially listed as "submission (terror)". Son would return to PRIDE in July, facing Jukei Nakajima, and he once again gave up after being injured by being thrown on his head by the Japanese fighter.

Son was also a professional wrestler in Japan for a short time, wrestling Shinya Hashimoto at All Japan Pro Wrestling's second Wrestle-1 event and working as singer and dancer for HUSTLE's third event.

== Fighting style ==
Son entered UFC officially billed to the audience as a Taekwondo 3rd Dan Black Belt, Judo practitioner, and the founder of a style called "Josondo". However, his teammate Kimo Leopoldo later disputed these promotional credentials in an interview, characterizing Son instead as a "street fighter" who relied entirely on natural power and athleticism rather than formal traditional martial arts training. During his actual bout, Son wore standard wrestling shoes and visually utilized standard American folk wrestling maneuvers, such as an opening clinch takedown and a front headlock hold on the ground.

== Acting career ==
Apart from his criminal convictions, Son is known for his role in the 1997 movie Austin Powers: International Man of Mystery as Random Task, a parody of the James Bond character Oddjob. This was also his final film role. Previously, Son had appeared in several low-budget action films, including Joshua Tree (1993) and Bloodfist V: Human Target (1994). He played the main villain in the Lorenzo Lamas action film Bad Blood in 1994. He plays a supporting role in Shootfighter: Fight to the Death (1993) and a leading role as the main villain in its sequel Shootfighter II (1996).

== Torture and manslaughter convictions ==
Joe Son was first arrested for kicking in the door of a roommate's car. He pleaded guilty to felony vandalism on May 16, 2008, whereupon he was sentenced to probation and 60 days in jail. As a condition of his plea agreement, Son was required to provide a DNA sample. On August 18, 2008, he was taken into custody and given an additional 90 days in jail for failing to report to the Department of Probation and keep them informed of his current residence. In early October 2008, his DNA sample was matched to a sexual assault cold case that occurred on Christmas Eve, 1990. Already in custody for a probation violation, Son was arrested at the Theo Lacy facility on October 7, 2008.

On December 24, 1990, the anonymous victim was walking back to her apartment alone with her dog. Son distracted her by asking for directions and pretending he was lost. Son, and accomplice Santiago Gaitan, a friend from high school, then forcibly dragged her to their car, and threatened to kill her. Son and Gaitan repeatedly raped, sodomized, tortured, and pistol whipped the woman. Eventually, after pushing her out of the car naked and carrying out a mock execution, Son released her. Investigators collected DNA from the woman and created composite sketches, but there was not a large enough DNA databank in 1990 to make a connection, and the sketches went unrecognized.

After Son's 2008 arrest, the search began for his accomplice. Gaitan was identified when a photograph of Joe Son was paired with the sketches, and detectives matched his DNA to the crime scene.

Son was initially charged in Orange County, California, with five counts of sexual assault, two felony counts of forcible sodomy, two felony counts of sodomy in concert by force, seven felony counts of forcible oral copulation, and one felony count of sexual penetration by foreign object by force. He faced a maximum sentence of 275 years to life. However, before jury selection could begin for his trial in August 2011, the charges against Son were dropped having expired due to the statute of limitations on sexual assault and kidnapping. Son was instead charged with conspiracy to commit murder and torture, crimes with no statute of limitations.

Gaitan, 40, confessed and pled guilty to one felony count each of kidnapping, "sodomy by force in concert", "rape in concert", "forcible oral copulation", and "forcible rape with a sentencing enhancement for committing rape while armed with a firearm". He was sentenced January 28, 2011, to 17 years and four months in state prison, with parole possible in 2018.

In an interrogation video filmed by the Huntington Beach Police Department, Son touted his acting career, but denied the crime or any contact with the victim, which he maintained to his trial. During the trial, the Orange County District Attorney's Office maintained that Son and his co-defendant pistol-whipped, tortured and repeatedly sexually assaulted their female victim before releasing her with her pants tied around her eyes. During the trial, the woman said that Son told her: "It's Christmas. This is your lucky day."

Son was found guilty of one felony count of torture, and given a life sentence. Less than a month later, Son was accused of killing his cellmate Michael Graham, who was beaten to death. The beating happened on October 10, 2011, at 5:25 pm, on "B" Yard Reception, building 5 at Wasco State Prison. The man died 25 minutes later from multiple blunt force trauma. The victim was someone who had lived as a transient, and was serving two years for failure to register as a sex offender. After the killing, Son was moved to solitary confinement. On September 13, 2013, Son was charged with Graham's murder. At his trial in 2017, he was found guilty of voluntary manslaughter, and received an additional 27-year sentence.

== Mixed martial arts record ==
Professional record breakdown
4 matches	0 wins	4 losses
By knockout	0	2
By submission	0	2

Res.	Record	Opponent	Method	Event	Date	Round	Time	Location	Notes
Loss	0–4	Jukei Nakajima	TKO (shoulder injury)	Pride The Best Vol.2	July 20, 2002	1	0:54	Tokyo, Japan	
Loss	0–3	Joe Moreira	Submission (terror)	Xtreme Pankration 2	April 12, 2002	1	N/A	Los Angeles, California, United States	
Loss	0–2	Yusuke Imamura	TKO (elbow injury)	Pride The Best Vol.1	February 22, 2002	1	0:33	Tokyo, Japan	
Loss	0–1	Keith Hackney	Submission (groin strikes)	UFC 4	December 16, 1994	1	2:44	Tulsa, Oklahoma, United States	

== Kickboxing record ==
Result	Record	Opponent	Method	Event	Date	Round	Time	Location	Notes
Loss	0–1	(Japan) Nobuaki Kakuda	KO (Punch)	K-3 Grand Prix '95	July 16, 1995	1	1:40	Nagoya, Japan	

== See also ==
- List of male mixed martial artists
