= UFC 5 =

UFC mixed martial arts event in 1995

UFC 5: Gracie vs. Shamrock 2
- The poster for UFC 5: Gracie vs. Shamrock 2
- Promotion: Ultimate Fighting Championship
- Date: April 7, 1995
- Venue: Independence Arena
- City: Charlotte, North Carolina
- Attendance: 6,000
- Buyrate: 260,000

Event chronology
UFC 4: Revenge of the Warriors	UFC 5: Gracie vs. Shamrock 2	UFC 6: Clash of the Titans

UFC 5: The Return of the Beast was a mixed martial arts event held by the Ultimate Fighting Championship on April 7, 1995, at the Independence Arena in Charlotte, North Carolina, United States. The event was seen live on pay per view in the United States, and later released on home video.

== History ==
UFC 5 used an eight-man tournament format, with the winner receiving $50,000. The event also featured the first ever UFC Superfight, as well as two alternate fights, which were not shown on the live pay-per-view broadcast. The tournament had no weight classes or weight limits, and the fights had to end by submission, throwing in the towel, knockout, or referee stoppage, and thus, no judges were used. Fight judges and weight classes would finally become part of the UFC framework in UFC 8 and UFC 12 respectively.

The Superfight match was the main attraction, and the winner of this fight would become the reigning UFC Champion. It consisted of rivals Royce Gracie and Ken Shamrock facing off in the most anticipated match in UFC history to that date, which led to the highest pay-per-view buyrate the UFC had achieved. Up to this point, Ken Shamrock's only defeat in the UFC was to Royce Gracie in UFC 1. Unfortunately for fans, the resulting bout has been ranked as one of the worst fights in MMA history, often described as "boring" and "35 minutes of Ken Shamrock laying on top of Royce Gracie."

UFC 5 was the first UFC event to feature any kind of time limits since UFC 1. A 20-minute time limit was imposed for the quarterfinal and semi-final round matches in the tournament. The finals of the tournament and the Superfight had a 30-minute time limit. The Superfight overran to 31 minutes before incorporating an on-the-spot decision to extend the fight by a further five minutes. As there was still no winner, the match was declared a draw.

In the tournament side of the event, Dan Severn won in the finals by defeating Dave Beneteau via a keylock submission. The referee for the night was 'Big' John McCarthy.

This UFC event was the last with the involvement of UFC co-creator Rorion Gracie, ostensibly because of the introduction of time-limits, which ran counter to his family's ethos of Brazilian jiu-jitsu in which fights should go to a finish. Gracie and his partner Art Davie later sold WOW Promotions, co-promoters of the event, to WOW's partner, Semaphore Entertainment Group. Royce Gracie also ended his involvement following Rorion's departure until he returned for UFC 60.

This event saw the implementation of a fight time limit in order to present the entire show in the allotted satellite time. The show ran 2 hours and 40 minutes, which was 40 minutes "over" the scheduled time, but UFC purchased 3 hours of satellite pay-per-view time in preparation. This was unlike UFC 4, where many PPV providers cut the show off after the first 2 hours.

With this event, many of the fighters received nicknames, including:

- Dan Severn – The Beast
- Oleg Taktarov – The Russian Bear
- Todd Medina – El Tiburon
- Joe Charles – The Ghetto Man
- Jon Hess – The Giant With an Attitude

== Results ==
Superfight Championship
Weight class				Method	Round	Time	Notes
N/A	Ken Shamrock	vs.	Royce Gracie	Draw		36:06	(Note: Superfight Championship bout: After 30 minutes of grappling, the referee stood both fighters up and had them fight a 5 minute overtime round. Neither fighter was able to achieve decisive victory and the match was declared a draw.)
Final
N/A	Dan Severn	def.	Dave Beneteau	Submission (americana)		3:01
Semifinals
N/A	Dave Beneteau	def.	Todd Medina	TKO (submission to strikes)		2:12	(Note: Beneteau replaced Jon Hess, who had broken his hand during his first match.)
N/A	Dan Severn	def.	Oleg Taktarov	TKO (cut)		4:21
Quarterfinals
N/A	Jon Hess	def.	Andy Anderson	TKO (punches)		1:23
N/A	Todd Medina	def.	Larry Cureton	Submission (forearm choke)		2:55
N/A	Oleg Taktarov	def.	Ernie Verdicia	Submission (arm-triangle choke)		2:23
N/A	Dan Severn	def.	Joe Charles	Submission (rear-naked choke)		1:38
Alternate bouts
N/A	Dave Beneteau	def.	Asbel Cancio	TKO (punches)		0:21
N/A	Guy Mezger	def.	John Dowdy	TKO (punches)		2:02

== UFC 5 bracket ==
Quarterfinals
(United States) Jon Hess (Kung Fu)	TKO
(United States) Andy Anderson (Taekwondo)	1:23
(United States) Todd Medina (Jeet Kune Do)	SUB
(United States) Larry Cureton (Kickboxing)	2:55
(Russia) Oleg Taktarov (Sambo)	SUB
(United States) Ernie Verdicia (Kenpo)	2:23
(United States) Dan Severn (Wrestling)	SUB
(United States) Joe Charles (Judo)	1:38

Semifinals
(Canada) Dave Beneteau ^{1}	TKO
(United States) Todd Medina	2:12
(Russia) Oleg Taktarov	4:21
(United States) Dan Severn	TKO

Finals
(Canada) Dave Beneteau	3:01
(United States) Dan Severn	SUB

^{1}Jon Hess was fined $2,000 for fouls committed in his fight. He withdrew with a hand injury, and was replaced by Dave Beneteau.

== Encyclopedia awards ==
The following fighters were honored in the October 2011 book titled UFC Encyclopedia.

- Fight of the Night: Oleg Taktarov vs. Ernie Verdicia
- Knockout of the Night: Jon Hess def. Andy Anderson
- Submission of the Night: Oleg Taktarov def. Ernie Verdicia

== See also ==
- Ultimate Fighting Championship
- List of UFC champions
- List of UFC events
- 1995 in UFC
