= Ultimate Ultimate 1995 =

UFC mixed martial arts event in 1995

- The poster for Ultimate Ultimate 1995
- Promotion: Ultimate Fighting Championship
- Date: December 16, 1995
- Venue: Mammoth Gardens
- City: Denver, Colorado
- Attendance: 2,800
- Buyrate: 251,000

Event chronology
UFC 7: The Brawl in Buffalo	Ultimate Ultimate 1995	UFC 8: David vs. Goliath

UFC: The Ultimate Ultimate (also known as Ultimate Ultimate 1995 or UFC 7.5) was an event held by the Ultimate Fighting Championship on December 16, 1995, at the Mammoth Gardens in Denver, Colorado. The event was seen live on pay-per view in the United States, and later released on home video.

== History ==
Ultimate Ultimate 1995 was a 2-year anniversary event, featuring an eight-man tournament composed primarily of champions and finalists from the UFC's first seven events, with the winner receiving $150,000. The event also featured two alternate fights, which were not shown on the live pay-per-view broadcast.

The tournament had no weight classes, or weight limits. Each match had no rounds, but a 15-minute time limit was imposed for the quarterfinal and an 18-minute time limit for semi-final round matches in the tournament.

The finals of the tournament had a 27-minute time limit and, if necessary, a three-minute overtime.

Ultimate Ultimate 1995 was also the first UFC event to feature judges, who would score the bouts in the event of a draw.

The referee for the night was 'Big' John McCarthy.

Dan Severn won the tournament by defeating Oleg Taktarov.

Six of the nine fights ended by submission. The other three ended by Unanimous Decision (The Semi-finals and The Finals).

== Results ==
Final
Weight class				Method	Round	Time	Notes
N/A	Dan Severn	def.	Oleg Taktarov	Decision (unanimous)		30:00
Semifinals
N/A	Dan Severn	def.	Tank Abbott	Decision (unanimous)		18:00
N/A	Oleg Taktarov	def.	Marco Ruas	Decision (unanimous)		18:00
Quarterfinals
N/A	Tank Abbott	def.	Steve Jennum	Submission (neck crank)		1:14
N/A	Dan Severn	def.	Paul Varelans	Submission (arm-triangle choke)		1:01
N/A	Marco Ruas	def.	Keith Hackney	Submission (rear-naked choke)		2:39
N/A	Oleg Taktarov	def.	Dave Beneteau	Submission (achilles hold)		1:15
Alternate bouts
N/A	Joe Charles	def.	Scott Bessac	Submission (armlock)		4:38
N/A	Mark Hall	def.	Trent Jenkins	Submission (armlock)		5:29

== Ultimate Ultimate 1995 bracket ==
Quarterfinals
(United States) Tank Abbott	SUB
(United States) Steve Jennum	1:14
(United States) Dan Severn	SUB
(United States) Paul Varelans	1:01
(Brazil) Marco Ruas	SUB
(United States) Keith Hackney	2:39
(Russia) Oleg Taktarov	SUB
(Canada) Dave Beneteau	1:15

Semifinals
(United States) Tank Abbott	18:00
(United States) Dan Severn	DEC
(Brazil) Marco Ruas	18:00
(Russia) Oleg Taktarov	DEC

Finals
(United States) Dan Severn	DEC
(Russia) Oleg Taktarov	30:00

== Encyclopedia awards ==
The following fighters were honored in the October 2011 book titled UFC Encyclopedia.

- Fight of the Night: Dan Severn vs. Paul Varelans
- Submission of the Night: Oleg Taktarov def. Dave Beneteau

== See also ==
- Ultimate Fighting Championship
- List of UFC champions
- List of UFC events
- 1995 in UFC
