= Anthony Macias =

American mixed martial arts fighter

- Born: February 9, 1969 (age 57); Oklahoma City, Oklahoma, United States
- Other names: Mad Dog
- Height: 5 ft 10 in (1.78 m)
- Weight: 170 lb (77 kg; 12 st)
- Division: Heavyweight; Light Heavyweight; Middleweight; Welterweight; Lightweight
- Style: Muay Thai
- Fighting out of: Oklahoma City, Oklahoma, United States
- Rank: Black belt in Karate; Black belt in Taekwondo

Mixed martial arts record
- Total: 44
- Wins: 26
- By knockout: 4
- By submission: 17
- By decision: 2
- Unknown: 3
- Losses: 18
- By knockout: 8
- By submission: 9
- By decision: 1

Other information
- Mixed martial arts record from Sherdog

Anthony Macias (born February 9, 1969) is a retired American mixed martial artist. His nickname, "Mad Dog", comes from the way he fights, reflected by the fact that only three of his 44 fights ended via decision.

== Mixed martial arts career ==
=== Early career ===
Macias began his career during the infancy of the sport in 1994, facing the future UFC champion Dan Severn at UFC 4. Macias was defeated via first-round submission. Macias appeared again in the UFC 6 tournament, defeating He-Man Gipson via first-round TKO. Later he faced Oleg Taktarov, losing via submission in the first round.

After compiling a record of 15-5, he was slated to return to major promotions.

=== PRIDE Fighting Championships ===
Macias made his PRIDE debut at PRIDE 7, against legendary Japanese fighter Kazushi Sakuraba. Macias lost via second-round submission.

Macias returned to the promotion three years later at PRIDE The Best Volume 1, facing Eiji Mitsuoka. Macias was defeated via unanimous decision.

== Mixed martial arts record ==
Professional record breakdown
44 matches	26 wins	18 losses
By knockout	4	8
By submission	17	9
By decision	2	1
Unknown	3	0

Res.	Record	Opponent	Method	Event	Date	Round	Time	Location	Notes
Loss	26–18	Zac Kelley	TKO (punches)	Oklahoma Fighting Championship 1	April 18, 2014	1	0:24	Oklahoma City, Oklahoma, United States	
Loss	26–17	Kemmyelle Haley	Submission (armbar)	SCS 21: No Surrender	January 25, 2014	1	1:17	Hinton, Oklahoma, United States	For the SCS Welterweight Championship.
Loss	26–16	Roy Spoon	TKO (punches)	Back Alley Promotions	September 3, 2011	2	3:26	Arlington, Texas, United States	
Loss	26–15	Mike Budnik	Submission (choke)	C3 Fights: Knockout-Rockout Weekend 4	July 17, 2010	2	1:30	Clinton, Oklahoma, United States	
Win	26–14	Edwynn Jones	Submission (guillotine choke)	Xtreme Knockout 7	June 5, 2010	1	2:07	Arlington, Texas, United States	
Loss	25–14	Marcus Hicks	Submission (armbar)	Supreme Warrior Championship 10: Art of War	April 3, 2010	1	1:45	Frisco, Texas, United States	
Loss	25–13	Ryan Larson	Submission (rear-naked choke)	KOK 8: The Uprising	February 27, 2010	1	3:28	Austin, Texas, United States	
Loss	25–12	Daniel Roberts	TKO (submission to punches)	5150 Combat League/XFL: New Year's Revolution	January 16, 2010	1	4:00	Tulsa, Oklahoma, United States	
Win	25–11	Shonie Carter	Decision (unanimous)	Freestyle Cage Fighting 37	November 7, 2009	3	5:00	Tulsa, Oklahoma, United States	
Win	24–11	Chris Zelinsky	Submission	World Extreme Fighting: Enid	September 24, 2005	1	0:47	Enid, Oklahoma, United States	
Loss	23–11	Josh Neer	TKO (punches)	FFC 11: Explosion	September 10, 2004	1	0:41	Biloxi, Mississippi, United States	Welterweight debut.
Win	23–10	Kevin Gittemeir	Submission (toe hold)	ISCF: Friday Night Fight	January 23, 2004	1	N/A	Atlanta, Georgia, United States	Lightweight debut.
Loss	22–10	Joe Doerksen	TKO (punches)	Freestyle Fighting Championships 5	April 25, 2003	1	3:10	Biloxi, Mississippi, United States	
Win	22–9	Luis Morales	Submission (kneebar)	World Fighting Championships 2	August 16, 2002	1	N/A	El Paso, Texas, United States	
Win	21–9	Frank Alcala	Submission (heel hook)	World Fighting Championships 1	June 26, 2002	1	N/A	San Antonio, Texas, United States	
Win	20–9	Chad Cook	Submission (armbar)	Reality Combat Fighting 15	April 13, 2002	1	0:39	N/A	
Loss	19–9	Eiji Mitsuoka	Decision (unanimous)	PRIDE The Best Vol.1	February 22, 2002	2	5:00	Tokyo, Japan	
Win	19–8	Anthony Barbier	Submission (guillotine choke)	Freestyle Fighting Championships 1	January 12, 2002	1	N/A	Biloxi, Mississippi, United States	
Win	18–8	Hector Garza	Submission (heel hook)	Renegades Extreme Fighting	November 17, 2001	1	1:20	Texas, United States	
Loss	17–8	Jesse Jones	Submission (rear-naked choke)	Extreme Challenge 44	September 15, 2001	1	2:23	Lake Charles, Louisiana, United States	Return to Middleweight.
Loss	17–7	Steve Heath	TKO (injury)	International Fighting Championships Warriors Challenge 6	March 25, 2000	1	4:10	Friant, California, United States	
Win	17–6	Tony Ross	TKO (cut)	TFC 1: Fightzone	February 26, 2000	N/A	N/A	Fort Wayne, Indiana, United States	Return to Light Heavyweight.
Win	16–6	Cedric Marks	Submission (rear-naked choke)	World Class Shootfighting	November 20, 1999	1	N/A	McKinney, Texas, United States	Middleweight bout.
Loss	15–6	Kazushi Sakuraba	Submission (armbar)	PRIDE 7	September 12, 1999	2	2:30	Yokohama, Japan	
Win	15–5	Cedric Marks	Submission (guillotine choke)	Power Ring Warriors	July 23, 1998	1	4:42	N/A	Middleweight bout.
Loss	14–5	Vladimir Matyushenko	TKO (doctor stoppage)	International Fighting Championships 7: Cage Combat	May 30, 1998	1	0:16	Kahnawake, Canada	
Loss	14–4	Vladimir Matyushenko	TKO (submission to punches)	International Fighting Championships 5: Battle in the Bayou	September 5, 1997	1	2:59	Baton Rouge, Louisiana, United States	
Win	14–3	Wes Gassaway	TKO (submission to punches)	International Fighting Championships 5: Battle in the Bayou	September 5, 1997	1	3:49	Baton Rouge, Louisiana, United States	
Win	13–3	Yvonne Labbe	Submission (rear-naked choke)	International Fighting Championships 5: Battle in the Bayou	September 5, 1997	1	0:38	Baton Rouge, Louisiana, United States	Return to Heavyweight.
Win	12–3	Paul Kimbro	N/A	World Fighting Council	May 15, 1997	N/A	N/A	N/A	
Win	11–3	Courtney Ortega	N/A	World Fighting Council	May 15, 1997	N/A	N/A	N/A	
Loss	10–3	Allan Goes	TKO (submission to punches)	Extreme Fighting 3	October 18, 1996	1	3:52	Tulsa, Oklahoma, United States	Light Heavyweight debut.
Win	10–2	Brian Gassaway	Submission (kneebar)	International Fighting Championships 2: Mayhem in Mississippi	August 23, 1996	1	1:28	Biloxi, Mississippi, United States	Won IFC 2 Tournament
Win	9–2	Houston Dorr	Submission (armbar)	International Fighting Championships 2: Mayhem in Mississippi	August 23, 1996	1	0:17	Biloxi, Mississippi, United States	
Win	8–2	Gene Lydick	TKO (doctor)	International Fighting Championships 2: Mayhem in Mississippi	August 23, 1996	1	1:13	Biloxi, Mississippi, United States	
Win	7–2	James Minson	Submission (guillotine choke)	Oklahoma Free Fight Federation 2	March 23, 1996	1	N/A	Enid, Oklahoma, United States	Won OFFF 2 Tournament
Win	6–2	Ron Goins	KO	Oklahoma Free Fight Federation 2	March 23, 1996	2	N/A	Enid, Oklahoma, United States	
Win	5–2	William Diaz	Submission (heel hook)	Oklahoma Free Fight Federation 2	March 23, 1996	1	N/A	Enid, Oklahoma, United States	
Win	4–2	Jason Nicholsen	N/A	Oklahoma Free Fight Federation 1	February 9, 1996	1	0:57	Tulsa, Oklahoma, United States	Won OFFF 1 Tournament
Win	3–2	John Dixson	Decision	Oklahoma Free Fight Federation 1	February 9, 1996	3	3:00	Tulsa, Oklahoma, United States	
Win	2–2	Jim Mullen	Submission (guillotine choke)	Oklahoma Free Fight Federation 1	February 9, 1996	1	1:54	Tulsa, Oklahoma, United States	
Loss	1–2	Oleg Taktarov	Submission (guillotine choke)	UFC 6	July 14, 1995	1	0:09	Casper, Wyoming, United States	
Win	1–1	He-Man Ali Gipson	TKO (submission to punches)	UFC 6	July 14, 1995	1	3:06	Casper, Wyoming, United States	
Loss	0–1	Dan Severn	Submission (rear naked choke)	UFC 4	December 16, 1994	1	1:45	Tulsa, Oklahoma, United States	
