= Keith Hackney =

American martial artist

- Born: April 15, 1958 (age 68); Roselle, Illinois, U.S.
- Other names: "The Giant Killer"
- Height: 5 ft 11 in (1.80 m)
- Weight: 200 lb (91 kg; 14 st)
- Style: Kenpo Karate, Boxing, Taekwondo, Wrestling, Tang Soo Do, Jujutsu, Submission Fighting
- Fighting out of: Illinois, U.S.
- Team: Hackney Combat Academy MMA
- Rank: 4th dan black belt in Kenpo Karate; 2nd dan black belt in Tang Soo Do; 2nd dan black belt in Taekwondo
- Years active: 1994–1995 (MMA)

Mixed martial arts record
- Total: 4
- Wins: 2
- By knockout: 1
- By submission: 1
- Losses: 2
- By submission: 2

Other information
- Mixed martial arts record from Sherdog

Keith Hackney (born April 15, 1958) is an American retired mixed martial arts fighter. He competed in three Ultimate Fighting Championship tournaments.

== Biography ==
Hackney started training martial arts at the age 11 by learning Wrestling and Boxing. Two years later, he began learning the art of Taekwondo and eventually received a second degree black belt. He also holds a second degree black belt in Tang Soo Do. In 1990, he furthered his martial arts training by beginning to train White Tiger Kenpo Karate, eventually earning a fourth degree black belt.

In 1994, Hackney would start training in Jujutsu and Submission Fighting, and was contacted by Art Davie for the Ultimate Fighting Championship. He was slated to compete at the UFC 3 tournament, where he entered as a replacement for one of the original fighters. In his first match, Hackney faced 616-lb sumo champion Emmanuel Yarbrough, but he overcame the size difference by attacking fast and aggressively, knocking Yarbrough down with a palm strike. Yarbrough got up and pushed Hackney through the cage door, but once the fight was restarted, Keith followed with a flurry of punches to the top and back of the head, making the referee stop the fight. Hackney left the cage with an injured wrist, however, and was forced to abandon the tournament.

Hackney returned at UFC 4, where he faced Joe Son in a fight made infamous by the UFC rule from the time which allowed groin strikes. Keith was taken down and endangered with a guillotine choke, but he resorted to repeatedly punching Son's groin in order to make him release the hold, prompting Son to tap out. The kenpo practitioner advanced in the tournament, going on to face UFC 1 and 2 winner Royce Gracie at the next round.

Pitted against Royce, Hackney managed to resist some initial takedowns, even getting a clean sprawl in an instance, and landed multiple shots through the attempts. After exchanging knees, Gracie pulled guard and attempted a triangle choke, only for Hackney to stand and land a right hand which marked Royce's face. At the end, however, Royce got the armbar and made him tap out.

His last MMA fight would be at the event Ultimate Ultimate 1995, where he fought Marco Ruas in a losing effort.

Hackney has appeared in two movies: as an actor in Superfights and doing stunts in Cut and Thrust.

== Career accomplishments ==
=== Mixed martial arts ===
- Ultimate Fighting Championship
  - UFC Encyclopedia Awards
    - Knockout of the Night (One time) vs. Emmanuel Yarbrough

== Mixed martial arts record ==
Professional record breakdown
4 matches	2 wins	2 losses
By knockout	1	0
By submission	1	2

Res.	Record	Opponent	Method	Event	Date	Round	Time	Location	Notes
Loss	2–2	Marco Ruas	Submission (rear-naked choke)	Ultimate Ultimate 1995	December 16, 1995	1	2:39	Denver, Colorado, United States	Ultimate Ultimate 1995 Quarterfinal.
Loss	2–1	Royce Gracie	Submission (armbar)	UFC 4	December 16, 1994	1	5:32	Tulsa, Oklahoma, United States	UFC 4 Tournament Semifinal.
Win	2–0	Joe Son	Submission (groin strikes)	UFC 4	December 16, 1994	1	2:44	Tulsa, Oklahoma, United States	UFC 4 Tournament Quarterfinal.
Win	1–0	Emmanuel Yarbrough	TKO (punches)	UFC 3	September 9, 1994	1	1:59	Charlotte, North Carolina, United States	UFC 3 Tournament Quarterfinal. Withdrew from tournament due to hand injury.
