= UFC 4 =

UFC mixed martial arts event in 1994

UFC 4: Revenge of the Warriors
- The poster for UFC 4: Revenge of the Warriors
- Promotion: Ultimate Fighting Championship
- Date: December 16, 1994
- Venue: Expo Square Pavilion
- City: Tulsa, Oklahoma
- Attendance: 5,857
- Buyrate: 120,000

Event chronology
UFC 3: The American Dream	UFC 4: Revenge of the Warriors	UFC 5: The Return of the Beast

UFC 4: Revenge of the Warriors was a mixed martial arts (MMA) event held by the Ultimate Fighting Championship (UFC) on December 16, 1994, at the Expo Center Pavilion in Tulsa, Oklahoma, United States. The event was seen live on pay-per-view, and later released on home video.

== Background ==
As usual, virtually all martial artists of any significance were contacted by the promoters of the event. The other way they recruited was what later became known as the "Royce's challenge letters." Even Mike Tyson was "challenged" by Royce Gracie while in jail.

== History ==
UFC 4 used an eight-man tournament format, with the winner receiving $64,000. The event also featured three alternate fights. All seven tournament fights were shown on the live pay-per-view broadcast, as well as the Jason Fairn vs. Guy Mezger alternate fight.

The tournament had no weight classes or weight limits. Each match had no time limit or rounds, therefore no judges were used for the night. The referee for the night was "Big" John McCarthy. Royce Gracie won the event by defeating Dan Severn with a triangle choke. The card also featured the notorious fight between Keith Hackney and Joe Son; Hackney won via submission after landing a series of unanswered strikes to the groin of Joe Son.

Play-by-play announcer Bruce Beck and color commentator Jeff Blatnick were paired together for the first time on the pay-per-view and became the regular commentary team on UFC broadcasts up to and including UFC 15. They were joined by regular contributor Jim Brown.

== Results ==
Final
Weight class				Method	Round	Time	Notes
N/A	Royce Gracie	def.	Dan Severn	Submission (triangle choke)		15:49
Semifinals
N/A	Royce Gracie	def.	Keith Hackney	Submission (armbar)		5:32
N/A	Dan Severn	def.	Marcus Bossett	Submission (arm-triangle choke)		0:52	(Note: Steve Jennum was forced to withdraw due to injury. He was replaced by Marcus Bossett.)
Quarterfinals
N/A	Royce Gracie	def.	Ron van Clief	Submission (rear-naked choke)		3:49
N/A	Keith Hackney	def.	Joe Son	Submission (blood choke)		2:44
N/A	Steve Jennum	def.	Melton Bowen	Submission (armbar)		4:47
N/A	Dan Severn	def.	Anthony Macias	Submission (rear-naked choke)		1:45
Alternate bouts
N/A	Joe Charles	def.	Kevin Rosier	Submission (armbar)		0:14
N/A	Marcus Bossett	def.	Eldo Dias Xavier	KO (strikes)		4:55
N/A	Guy Mezger	def.	Jason Fairn	TKO (corner stoppage)		2:13

== UFC 4 bracket ==
Quarterfinals
(Brazil) Royce Gracie (Brazilian Jiu-Jitsu)	SUB
(United States) Ron van Clief (Karate)	3:59
(United States) Keith Hackney (Kenpo)	SUB
(United States) Joe Son (Taekwondo)	2:44
(United States) Steve Jennum (Ninjutsu)	SUB
(United States) Melton Bowen (Boxing)	4:47
(United States) Dan Severn (Wrestling)	SUB
(United States) Anthony Macias (Muay Thai)	1:45

Semifinals
(Brazil) Royce Gracie	SUB
(United States) Keith Hackney	5:32
(United States) Marcus Bossett ^{1}	0:52
(United States) Dan Severn	SUB

Finals
(Brazil) Royce Gracie	SUB
(United States) Dan Severn	15:49

^{1}Steve Jennum was forced to withdraw due to injury. He was replaced by Marcus Bossett.

== Encyclopedia awards ==
The following fighters were honored in the October 2011 book titled UFC Encyclopedia.

- Fight of the Night: Royce Gracie vs. Dan Severn
- Knockout of the Night: Marcus Bossett def. Eldo Dias Xavier
- Submission of the Night: Royce Gracie def. Dan Severn

== See also ==
- List of UFC champions
- List of UFC events
- 1994 in UFC
