= Emmanuel Yarbrough =

American sportsman (1964–2015)

- Born: September 5, 1964; Rahway, New Jersey, U.S.
- Died: December 21, 2015 (aged 51); Richmond, Virginia, U.S.
- Other names: Manny
- Nationality: American
- Height: 6 ft 8 in (2.03 m)
- Weight: 600 lb (272 kg; 42 st 12 lb)
- Division: Super Heavyweight
- Style: Sumo, Judo, Wrestling
- Rank: Brown Belt in judo
- Wrestling: NCAA Division I Wrestling

Mixed martial arts record
- Total: 3
- Wins: 1
- By submission: 1
- Losses: 2
- By knockout: 1
- By submission: 1

Other information
- Mixed martial arts record from Sherdog

Emmanuel Yarbrough (September 5, 1964 – December 21, 2015) was an American martial artist, professional wrestler, football player and actor. He was particularly known for his career in amateur sumo, and held the Guinness World Record for the heaviest living athlete.

== Background ==
Yarbrough started his sports career at Morgan State University, where he became an offensive tackle for the college football team before joining the college wrestling team. He was given the ironic nickname "Tiny" due to his large size. He achieved NCAA All-American Division II wrestler status in 1983 and 1985, the university later ascending to Division I in 1986, while in football he was a Division I athlete in 1982 and 1983. After college, Yarbrough trained in judo under Yoshisada Yonezuka, who coached him to a silver medal victory at the US Nationals tournament at brown belt level. This experience would lead him to take a further interest in martial arts, exploring amateur sumo and mixed martial arts.

== Amateur sumo career ==
Yarbrough started competing in amateur sumo in 1992. He won silver medals in the Sumo World Championships in 1992 and 1994, as well as a bronze medal in 1993. Two years later, after his appearance in Ultimate Fighting Championship, Yarbrough increased his previous weight by 282 lbs. Eventually, Yarbrough reached 704 lbs, which gave him the Guinness World Record for the heaviest living athlete. He quickly became the World Amateur Sumo Champion, leading him to be one of the most famous sumo wrestlers outside Japan.

In 2007, he intended to drop from 750 to 550 lbs in order to improve his health, still hoping to participate in the next Sumo World Championships and the US Olympic judo tryouts.

== Mixed martial arts career ==
In 1994, Yarbrough applied to mixed martial arts promotion Ultimate Fighting Championship and took part in the event UFC 3 representing sumo. He was pitted against the much smaller Keith Hackney, a kempo representative, who opened the match by immediately knocking Yarborough down with a palm strike. Emmanuel recovered, pulled Hackney towards his chest and unloaded strikes on his neck, and then literally pushed him out the cage through the door in spectacular fashion. However, when the match was restarted, Hackney knocked Yarbrough again and followed with hand strikes for the TKO. Keith since took the nickname "The Giant Killer" for this victory.

Emmanuel's second MMA fight would be in Japan for the promotion Shooto. He faced Tatsuo Nakano, a former shoot-style professional wrestler whom Yarbrough outsized greatly. This time, the sumo wrestler got advantage of fighting in a ring and cornered Nakano against the turnbuckle, taking dominant position over him. When the contenders were relocated on the center of the ring, Yarbrough just shifted his abdomen over Nakano's head. Unable to get out from under his opponent and being smothered by the weight, the Japanese fighter tapped out, giving Yarbrough his first and only victory.

Only months later, Emmanuel fought his third and last bout, for the Japanese promotion Pride Fighting Championships, facing his smallest opponent in the form of Japanese grappler Daiju Takase. Takase avoided engaging Yarbrough and earned a yellow card for inactivity in the second round. Eventually, Takase attempted a takedown, which Yarbrough was able to deny and gain dominant position; however, Takase managed to escape and landed numerous punches to Yarbrough's head and body, forcing him to submit.

== Professional wrestling career ==
From 1996 to 1997, Yarbrough competed in professional wrestling for Catch Wrestling Association in Germany, where he had gimmick matches based around his sumo career. He took part in a sumo tournament against the entire staff of the promotion, being declared winner after beating everybody except August Smisl and Terminator Mastino. He later won another tournament, beating the likes of Osamu Nishimura and Jason Neidhart, Jim Neidhart's storyline cousin.

== Acting ==
He appeared in a 1997 Bollywood film Mr. and Mrs. Khiladi which features Bollywood action hero Akshay Kumar and has appeared on several talk shows, as well as in a commercial for Motorola. He has also appeared on the HBO drama Oz as an inmate named Clarence Seroy. In 2000, he played himself in the German wrestling film Sumo Bruno.

== Health issues and death ==
Yarbrough battled all his life with food addiction. According to his manager, "he always said, 'I am a prisoner in my own body.'" By the age of 14 he already weighed 320 pounds, which he attributed to a poor diet of fried foods.

In 2007, Yarbrough was hospitalized for a week due to heart failure. He saw an obesity specialist and changed his diet, losing 130 pounds.

On December 21, 2015, Yarbrough died at age 51 of a heart attack.

== Mixed martial arts record ==
Professional record breakdown
3 matches	1 win	2 losses
By knockout	0	2
By submission	1	0
By decision	0	0

Res.	Record	Opponent	Method	Event	Date	Round	Time	Location	Notes
Loss	1–2	Daiju Takase	TKO (submission to punches)	Pride 3	June 24, 1998	2	3:22	Tokyo, Japan	
Win	1–1	Tatsuo Nakano	Submission (smother)	Shooto - Shoot the Shooto XX	April 26, 1998	1	1:17	Yokohama, Japan	
Loss	0–1	Keith Hackney	TKO (punches)	UFC 3	September 9, 1994	1	1:59	Charlotte, North Carolina, United States	

== Championships and accomplishments ==
=== Sumo ===
- 1995 World Amateur Sumo Champion
- 1992 1st Sumo World Championships Open Division 2nd Place
- 1993 2nd Sumo World Championships Open Division 3rd Place
- 1994 3rd Sumo World Championships Open Division 2nd Place
- 1996 5th Sumo World Championships Open Division 2nd Place

=== Collegiate wrestling ===
- NCAA All American, 1983, 1985 and 1986, Morgan State University

=== Judo ===
- Second place, U.S. Nationals 1989

=== College football ===
- NCAA Division I-AA All-American offensive tackle, Morgan State University, 1982, 1983
