= Joe Charles =

American MMA fighter

- Born: July 18, 1958 (age 68); Los Angeles, California, United States
- Other names: The Ghetto Man
- Height: 6 ft 1 in (1.85 m)
- Weight: 260 lb (120 kg; 19 st)
- Division: Heavyweight
- Fighting out of: Culver City, California, United States
- Rank: 3rd Dan Black Belt in Judo; Black Belt in Shotokan Karate; Black Belt in Kempo Karate; Brown Belt in Brazilian Jiu-Jitsu
- Years active: 1994 - 2000

Mixed martial arts record
- Total: 19
- Wins: 6
- By knockout: 2
- By submission: 3
- By decision: 1
- Losses: 13
- By knockout: 3
- By submission: 9
- By decision: 1

Other information
- Mixed martial arts record from Sherdog

Joe Charles (born July 18, 1958) is an American mixed martial artist. He competed in the Heavyweight division. He is best known for his time in the UFC from 1994 to 2000.

== Background ==
Born and raised in Los Angeles, Charles trained in Taekwondo, Kung Fu, Karate, Boxing, Wrestling, Judo, Sambo, and Brazilian Jiu-Jitsu. While preparing to try out for the 1984 Summer Olympics, Charles broke his femur in a work accident involving a forklift in 1982. He was told he would never be able to fight again and it took four years of rehabilitation before he was healthy enough to return to fighting in 1986.

== Personal life ==
After his fighting career, he developed a fitness program called GI Joe Boot Camp.

== Mixed martial arts record ==
Professional record breakdown
20 matches	7 wins	13 losses
By knockout	2	3
By submission	4	9
By decision	1	1

Res.	Record	Opponent	Method	Event	Date	Round	Time	Location	Notes
Loss	7-13	Kengo Watanabe	Decision (unanimous)	Pancrase: 2000 Anniversary Show	September 24, 2000	1	10:00	Yokohama, Kanagawa, Japan	
Loss	7-12	Marcelo Tigre	Submission (smother choke)	RITC 2: Marching of the Warriors	October 15, 1999	1	9:40	Honolulu, Hawaii, United States	
Win	7-11	Mark Smith	Decision	Ready to Rumble: Let's Get Ready to Rumble	October 13, 1999	0	N/A	Woodland Hills, California, United States	
Loss	6-11	Stefanos Miltsakakis	Submission (keylock)	WVC 9: World Vale Tudo Championship 9	September 27, 1999	1	8:38	Aruba	
Loss	6-10	Mikhail Avetisyan	TKO (submission to punches)	IAFC: Pankration World Championship 1999	May 1, 1999	1	11:21	Moscow, Russia	
Loss	6-9	Vitor Belfort	Submission (armbar)	UFC 15.5: Ultimate Japan 1	December 21, 1997	1	4:03	Yokohama, Japan	
Loss	6-8	Nick Nutter	TKO (submission to punches)	IAFC: 1st Absolute Fighting World Cup Pankration	November 12, 1997	1	4:34	Tel Aviv, Israel	
Win	6-7	Yuri Mildzikhov	Submission (heel hook)	IAFC: 1st Absolute Fighting World Cup Pankration	November 12, 1997	1	11:02	Tel Aviv, Israel	
Win	5-7	Andrey Surikov	TKO (submission to punches)	IAFC: Absolute Fighting Championship 2 [Day 2]	May 2, 1997	1	2:14	Moscow, Russia	
Loss	4-7	Karimula Barkalaev	Submission (forearm choke)	IAFC: Absolute Fighting Championship 2 [Day 1]	April 30, 1997	1	9:19	Moscow, Russia	
Loss	4-6	Dan Bobish	Submission (arm-triangle choke)	WFF: World Fighting Federation	February 24, 1997	1	4:42	Birmingham, Alabama, United States	
Loss	4-5	Pete Williams	Submission (kneebar)	SB 2: SuperBrawl 2	October 11, 1996	1	1:39	Honolulu, Hawaii, United States	
Win	4-4	Wes Gassaway	TKO (submission to strikes)	SB 2: SuperBrawl 2	October 11, 1996	1	3:26	Honolulu, Hawaii, United States	
Loss	3-4	Oleg Taktarov	Submission (kneebar)	WVC 1: World Vale Tudo Championship 1	August 14, 1996	1	4:42	Japan	
Loss	3-3	Murilo Bustamante	Submission (arm-triangle choke)	UVF: Universal Vale Tudo Fighting 2	June 24, 1996	1	3:08	Brazil	
Win	3-2	Scott Bessac	Submission (armlock)	UFC: Ultimate Ultimate 1995	December 16, 1995	1	4:38	Denver, Colorado, United States	
Loss	2-2	Carl Franks	TKO (submission to punches)	UFCF: United Full Contact Federation 2	November 9, 1995	1	26:42		
Win	2-1	Mark Williams	Submission (keylock)	UFCF: United Full Contact Federation 2	November 9, 1995	N/A	N/A	Hawaii, United States	
Loss	1-1	Dan Severn	Submission (rear-naked choke)	UFC 5: The Return of the Beast	April 7, 1995	1	1:38	Charlotte, North Carolina, United States	
Win	1-0	Kevin Rosier	Submission (armbar)	UFC 4: Revenge of the Warriors	December 16, 1994	1	0:14	Tulsa, Oklahoma, United States	

== See also ==
- List of male mixed martial artists
