= Total Force 2 =

- Film poster
- Directed by: Steven Kaman
- Written by: Steven Kaman
- Produced by: Rustam Branaman; Steven Kaman
- Starring: Timothy Bottoms; Oleg Taktarov; Tom Bresnahan; Warren A. Stevens; Calista Carradine
- Cinematography: Dwight F. Lay
- Edited by: Tucker Stilley
- Music by: Barry Coffing
- Distributed by: Cinequanon Pictures International Inc.
- Release date: May 26, 1997; (Turkey)
- Running time: 91 min.
- Country: United States
- Language: English

Total Force 2 (also known as Absolute Force) is a 1997 action film co-produced, written and directed by Steven Kaman and starring Timothy Bottoms and Oleg Taktarov. The film is a sequel for Total Force (1996), that was also written and directed by Kaman and starred by Bottoms.

== Premise ==
A corrupt politician intends to use a powerful weapon to execute an evil plan.

== Cast ==
- Timothy Bottoms as Lt. John Drake
- Oleg Taktarov as Agent Borris Checkniov
- Tom Bresnahan as Spike
- Warren A. Stevens as Stax
- Calista Carradine as August
