= UFC 6 =

UFC mixed martial arts event in 1995

UFC 6: Shamrock vs. Severn
- The poster for UFC 6: Shamrock vs. Severn
- Promotion: Ultimate Fighting Championship
- Date: July 14, 1995
- Venue: Casper Events Center
- City: Casper, Wyoming
- Attendance: 2,700
- Buyrate: 240,000

Event chronology
UFC 5: The Return of the Beast	UFC 6: Shamrock vs. Severn	UFC 7: The Brawl in Buffalo

UFC 6: Clash of the Titans was the sixth mixed martial arts event held by the Ultimate Fighting Championship on July 14, 1995, at the Casper Events Center in Casper, Wyoming. The event was seen live on pay per view in the United States, and later released on home video.

== History ==
UFC 6 featured the crowning of the first UFC Champion to win the title in a non-tournament format. The champion would be the winner of UFC 6. Also there was second special attraction match, called 'The Superfight' (later promoted heavyweight champion), which continued from UFC 5 as there was no official winner in the previous Superfight. UFC 6 also featured an eight-man tournament, and two alternate fights which were not shown on the live pay-per-view broadcast. The tournament had no weight classes, or weight limits. Each match had no rounds; therefore no judges were used for the night. A 20-minute time limit was imposed for the quarterfinal and semi-final round matches in the tournament. The finals of the tournament and the Superfight had a 30-minute time limit and, if necessary, a five-minute overtime.

This event continued the Superfight format from UFC 5 to determine the reigning UFC champion for tournament winners to face. Ken Shamrock remained in the spot and his opponent was UFC 5 champion Dan Severn in a championship match dubbed as "The Clash of the Titans".

The referee for the night was 'Big' John McCarthy, and Michael Buffer served as the guest ring announcer for the night. Ron Van Clief served as the UFC's first and only commissioner at the event. Taimak officiated the preliminary bouts at UFC 6 as well as UFC 7.

== Results ==
Superfight Championship
Weight class				Method	Round	Time	Notes
N/A	Ken Shamrock	def.	Dan Severn	Submission (guillotine choke)		2:14	(Note: Shamrock defeated Severn via submission (guillotine choke) at 2:14 to become the first UFC Superfight Champion.)
Finals
N/A	Oleg Taktarov	def.	Tank Abbott	Submission (rear-naked choke)		17:47
Semifinals
N/A	Tank Abbott	def.	Paul Varelans	TKO (punches)		1:53
N/A	Oleg Taktarov	def.	Anthony Macias	Submission (guillotine choke)		0:09	(Note: Macias replaced Patrick Smith, who could not continue due to stomach cramps.)
Quarterfinals
N/A	Tank Abbott	def.	John Matua	KO (punch)		0:20
N/A	Paul Varelans	def.	Cal Worsham	KO (elbow)		1:02
N/A	Patrick Smith	def.	Rudyard Moncayo	Submission (rear-naked choke)		1:08
N/A	Oleg Taktarov	def.	Dave Beneteau	Submission (guillotine)		0:57
Alternate bouts
N/A	Joel Sutton	def.	Jack McLaughlin	TKO (submission to punches)		2:01
N/A	Anthony Macias	def.	He-Man Ali Gipson	TKO (submission to punches)		3:06

== UFC 6 Bracket ==
Quarterfinals
(United States) Tank Abbott (Wrestling)	KO
(United States) John Matua (Kapu Kuialua)	0:20
(United States) Paul Varelans (Wrestling)	KO
(United States) Cal Worsham (Taekwondo)	1:02
(United States) Patrick Smith (Taekwondo)	SUB
(Ecuador) Rudyard Moncayo (American Kenpo)	1:08
(Russia) Oleg Taktarov (Sambo)	SUB
(Canada) Dave Beneteau (Wrestling)	0:57

Semifinals
(United States) Tank Abbott	TKO
(United States) Paul Varelans	1:53
(United States) Anthony Macias ^{1}	0:09
(Russia) Oleg Taktarov	SUB

Finals
(United States) Tank Abbott	17:45
(Russia) Oleg Taktarov	SUB

^{1}Patrick Smith was forced to withdraw due to injury. He was replaced by Anthony Macias.

== Encyclopedia awards ==
The following fighters were honored in the October 2011 book titled UFC Encyclopedia.

- Fight of the Night: Oleg Taktarov vs. Tank Abbott
- Knockout of the Night: Tank Abbott def. John Matua
- Submission of the Night: Ken Shamrock def. Dan Severn

== See also ==
- Ultimate Fighting Championship
- List of UFC champions
- List of UFC events
- 1995 in UFC
