= Dave Beneteau =

Canadian MMA fighter

- Born: June 22, 1967 (age 59); Windsor, Ontario, Canada
- Other names: Dangerous
- Height: 6 ft 2 in (1.88 m)
- Weight: 260 lb (120 kg; 19 st)
- Division: Heavyweight; Super Heavyweight; Openweight
- Style: Freestyle Wrestling, Judo, Boxing, Brazilian Jiu-Jitsu, Kickboxing
- Rank: Black Belt in Judo

Mixed martial arts record
- Total: 12
- Wins: 6
- By knockout: 2
- By submission: 3
- By decision: 1
- Losses: 5
- By knockout: 1
- By submission: 4
- Draws: 1

Other information
- Mixed martial arts record from Sherdog

David Beneteau (born June 22, 1967) is a Canadian former mixed martial artist who is best known for his appearances in Ultimate Fighting Championship at UFC 5, 6, 15 and, Ultimate Ultimate 1995.

Toward the end of his mixed martial arts career, Beneteau also performed professional wrestling matches for New Japan Pro-Wrestling and other promotions in Japan and Canada.

'Dangerous' Dave Beneteau retired from mixed martial arts to attend law school in 2002. He was admitted to the bar in 2003 and practiced primarily as a criminal defense lawyer under the tutelage of renowned Toronto defence lawyer, John Rosen, until 2007. In 2015, Beneteau earned a Master of Laws from Osgoode Hall Law School and is now a General Counsel for Movati Athletics in the Greater Toronto Area.

== Mixed martial arts career ==
=== Ultimate Fighting Championship ===
Beneteau debuted in the Ultimate Fighting Championship at its UFC 5 event in April 1995. He was billed as a Wrestler with experience and success in Judo. He finished his first opponent, Kung Fu practitioner Asbel Cancio, in only 21 seconds, needing just a takedown and a flurry of quick ground and pound to do so. Beneteau then faced Jeet Kune Do expert Todd Medina and defeated him in very much the same way, and then reached the finals, where he was pitted against wrestling champion and future hall-of-famer Dan Severn. The fight was hard-fought but short, with Severn tripping Beneteau down from the clinch and locking a keylock for the win.

Dave returned in UFC 6, where he faced former Russian Sambo champion Oleg Taktarov in the first round. Beneteau initiated the match with heavy punches and an early takedown, but Taktarov caught Beneteau in a guillotine choke for the win. Beneteau's dynamic style and skill earned him passage to one of the UFC's first tournament of champions, the Ultimate Ultimate 1995, which granted him a highly anticipated rematch against Taktarov. Beneteau lost again by way of an inverted rolling ankle lock.

=== Brazil and Japan ===
After his first UFC tenure, Beneteau made an appearance in Brazilian promotion Universal Vale Tudo Fighting, entering its UVF 4 tournament. Other decorated wrestlers with connections to UFC participated, among them Kevin Randleman and Dan Bobish. In the first round, Beneteau faced famed Brazilian boxer, Egidio "Sombra da Noite" Amaro da Costa, and made short work of him, taking down and submitting Amaro by keylock. The Canadian then advanced to fight the 50 pounds heavier Bobish, who controlled the bout with a guillotine choke with several strikes until getting the win by a cut.

Beneteau then travelled to Japan, where he defeated UFC II Tournament runner-up Patrick Smith in under a minute.

=== Return to UFC ===
Beneteau made his final UFC appearance in 1997, where he faced the Carlson Gracie apprentice and world heavyweight Brazilian Jiu-Jitsu champion Carlos Barreto. The latter was a heavy favorite entering the bout, having won the UVF 4 tournament and coming with a 7-0 record. Accordingly, Beneteau was in heavy danger at the beginning of the fight, as Barreto took his back and landed strikes to the back of his head while pursuing a rear naked choke, but the Canadian managed to escape and returned the favor via ground and pound against the fence. Due to this, Barreto changed his strategy and hit Beneteau with punches and kicks, but Beneteau executed a takedown and kept hitting with heavy hands through the Brazilian's guard. After several strikes scored, Beneteau was declared the winner by the judges' decision.

== Professional wrestling career ==
While training with Dan Severn in Coldwater, Michigan, and during a meeting in Severn's office, New Japan Pro-Wrestling called looking to book Severn for a tournament in Osaka. Since Severn was already booked that weekend, he suggested Beneteau could do the booking for him. Beneteau agreed and Severn trained him in the basics of pro wrestling so that he could perform for New Japan.

Beneteau then began to work with Don Frye and Brian Johnson in New Japan under the Club 245 stable which was named after the State of California criminal code for assault and bodily harm. Dave participated in a lot of tag team matches with Frye and even had singles matches with Yuji Nagata, Yoji Anjo and Naoya Ogawa.

Beneteau also did some work with Scott D'Amore's Border City Wrestling and Antonio Inoki's Universal Fighting Arts Organization (UFO).

== Championships and accomplishments ==
- Canadian Juvenile Freestyle Wrestling Champion, 1984
- Canadian Juvenile Freestyle Wrestling Champion, 1985
- Canadian Junior Freestyle Wrestling Champion, 1986
- United States Junior Freestyle Wrestling, Bronze Medalist, 1986
- Canadian Junior Freestyle Wrestling Champion, 1987
- United States Junior Freestyle Wrestling Champion, 1987

== Mixed martial arts record ==
Professional record breakdown
12 matches	6 wins	5 losses
By knockout	3	1
By submission	2	4
By decision	1	0
Draws	1	

Res.	Record	Opponent	Method	Event	Date	Round	Time	Location	Notes
Loss	6–5–1	Tim Catalfo	Submission (choke)	KOTC 9 - Showtime	June 23, 2001	1	0:25	San Jacinto, California, U.S.	
Win	6–4–1	Joe Campanella	Submission (keylock)	UCC 2: The Moment of Truth	August 12, 2000	1	1:06	Montreal, Quebec, Canada	Super Heavyweight bout.
Draw	5–4–1	Elvis Sinosic	Draw	UCC 1: The New Beginning	June 2, 2000	2	10:00	Montreal, Quebec, Canada	For TKO/UCC Heavyweight Championship.
Win	5–4	Carlos Barreto	Decision (unanimous)	UFC 15	October 17, 1997	1	15:00	Bay St. Louis, Mississippi, U.S.	
Win	4–4	Patrick Smith	TKO (submission to punches)	U - Japan	November 17, 1996	1	1:09	Sapporo, Japan	
Loss	3–4	Dan Bobish	TKO (cut)	Universal Vale Tudo Fighting 4	October 22, 1996	1	4:44	Brazil	UVTF 4 Tournament Semifinals.
Win	3–3	Egidio Amaro da Costa	Submission (keylock)	Universal Vale Tudo Fighting 4	October 22, 1996	1	2:36	Brazil	UVTF 4 Tournament First Round.
Loss	2–3	Oleg Taktarov	Submission (Achilles hold)	Ultimate Ultimate 1995	December 16, 1995	1	1:15	Denver, Colorado, U.S.	Ultimate Ultimate 1995 Opening Round.
Loss	2–2	Oleg Taktarov	Submission (guillotine choke)	UFC 6	July 14, 1995	1	0:57	Casper, Wyoming, U.S.	UFC 6 Tournament Opening Round.
Loss	2–1	Dan Severn	Submission (keylock)	UFC 5	April 7, 1995	1	3:01	Charlotte, North Carolina, U.S.	UFC 5 Tournament Finals.
Win	2–0	Todd Medina	TKO (punches)	UFC 5	April 7, 1995	1	2:12	Charlotte, North Carolina, U.S.	UFC 5 Tournament Semifinals.
Win	1–0	Asbel Cancio	TKO (punches)	UFC 5	April 7, 1995	1	0:21	Charlotte, North Carolina, U.S.	UFC 5 Tournament Reserve Bout.
