= Doris Beck (American politician) =

American politician (1929–2020)

Doris Lew Beck (March 15, 1929 – July 12, 2020) was an American Democratic Party politician who was the first woman to serve as Mayor of Livingston, New Jersey, and the first woman to serve as a Mayor in Essex County, New Jersey. She was born in Chehanovietzer (Ciechanowiec), Poland, the daughter of Benjamin and Miriam Lew. She worked as an English teacher and was the President of the League of Women Voters. She was elected to the Livingston Township Council in 1974, defeating two Republican incumbents, and became Mayor in 1975. She was re-elected in 1978.

== Personal life ==
She is the mother of WNBC-TV sports anchor Bruce Beck. She was married to Felix Beck before his death on March 26, 2019. Doris died on July 12, 2020, aged 91. She is buried in Mount Lebanon Cemetery in Iselin, New Jersey.
