= Moses Powell =

American martial artist

- Born: Norfolk, Virginia; Jan 13, 1941
- Died: January 22, 2005; Ft. Lauderdale Florida
- Other names: Master Musa Muhammad
- Nationality: American
- Style: Vee-Jitsu Te, Modern Ju Jitsu, Sanuces Ryu Jujutsu
- Teachers: Florendo M. Visitacion and Ron Duncan
- Rank: 10th degree black belt
- Years active: 1954– early 2000s

Other information
- Notable students: Ron van Clief
- Last updated on: October 2013

Moses Powell (1941–2005), also known as Master Musa Muhammad, was an American martial artist and founder of Sanuces Ryu Jujutsu, a syncretic martial art combining jujutsu, karate, and boxing.

== Early life and education ==
Powell was born in Norfolk, Virginia. Powell studied under Professor Florendo M. Visitacion (Professor Vee) in his Vee Jitsu syncretic martial art combining jujutsu with Filipino Arnis, Kung Fu, Aikido, and Judo. Powell trained in Shōrin-ryū Karate, and Tomiki Aikido, and weapons including katana and arnis sticks.

== Career ==
Powell held the rank of 10th degree black belt, and was famous for his one finger forward roll. Moses Powell was the first martial artist invited to perform a demonstration in front of the United Nations. One of the first African Americans to instruct the DEA, FBI, and the Secret Service in martial arts. He was also a featured demonstrator New York's World Fair in 1965. Notable for being a black martial artist (of minority ethnicity in the United States), he served as an instructor to movie star Wesley Snipes. He appeared in the documentary, the Warrior Within along with Kevin Leon Evans and Chuck Norris.

=== Media ===
Moses Powell appeared on the cover of Official Karate Magazine in September 1973, Spring 1982, and February 1976. He was covered in Legends of American Martial Arts (DVD)

Moses was also noted in the book Unlocking The Healing Powers in Your Hands: The 18 Mudra System of Qigong as a master of Jujitsu.

== Death ==
Powell died on January 22, 2005.
