= Ron van Clief =

American martial artist

- Born: January 25, 1943 (age 83); Brooklyn, New York City, United States
- Other names: Black Dragon
- Nationality: American
- Height: 5 ft 9 in (1.75 m)
- Weight: 190 lb (86 kg; 13 st 8 lb)
- Fighting out of: New York City, U.S.
- Teachers: Moses Powell, George Coffield
- Rank: Black Belt in Kung Fu; Black Belt in Karate; Black Belt in Judo; Black Belt in Kali; Black Belt in Jujutsu; Black Belt in Taekwondo

Mixed martial arts record
- Total: 1
- Wins: 0
- Losses: 1
- By submission: 1

Other information
- Mixed martial arts record from Sherdog

Ron Van Clief (born January 25, 1943) is an American martial artist and an actor in Hollywood and Hong Kong action films. He is best known for starring in 1970s blaxploitation and kung fu films. He is the father of poet Shihan van Clief. He also founded the Chinese Goju System in 1973.

== Early life ==
Ronald Van Clief was born and raised in Brooklyn, New York City on January 25, 1943. He joined the United States Marine Corps, serving at Marine Corps Base Camp Lejeune, NC from March 30, 1961, to March 21, 1962. He was stationed in Okinawa with the Third Marine Division from June 6, 1962, to June 1, 1963. He returned to Camp Lejeune and served there from August 3, 1963, until April 16, 1964, at which time he was sent on Temporary Additional Duty to the Marine Barracks at U.S. Navy Base Guantanamo, Cuba until September 12 that year. He returned to Camp Lejeune once more, where he remained until his release from Active Duty on April 16, 1965. His military decorations include: Marine Corps Good Conduct Medal, National Defense Service Medal, and Rifle "Sharpshooter" Badge.

== Martial arts ==
Ron van Clief began his martial arts career competing in both full-contact and non-contact karate tournaments in New York then internationally, going on to win several national tournaments and world championships.

Van Clief was a student of Gōjū-ryū masters Peter Urban and Frank Ruiz, as well as Wing Chun Grandmaster Leung Ting, Modern Arnis (Remy Presas) and Brazilian Jiu-Jitsu (Joe Moreira).

He also was trained in Sanuces Ryu Jiu Jitsu with Moses Powell, Shotokan Karate with George Cofield and Tom LaPuppet, and Ninjutsu with Ronald Duncan.

On December 16, 1994, Ron Van Clief returned to the ring to fight in the 4th Ultimate Fighting Championship, as the oldest competitor to date to fight in the UFC at the age of 51. Van Clief's sole fight in the tournament was against Brazilian jiu-jitsu expert Royce Gracie. Gracie won the match by submission with a rear naked choke near the four-minute mark. Ron went on to serve as the commissioner of the UFC. Ron Van Clief retired from competition in 2002 after winning the All American Karate Championship at 60 years old.

Van Clief competed in over 900 tournaments in over 40 years on the tournament circuit. Retired as a 5 time world karate/kungfu champion and 15 time all American champion.

Has been competing in BJJ tournaments since 2015 and still competes as of 2021.

Van Clief is also the author and creator of a number of instructional books and video recordings. His notable students include Taimak (Star of the Cult Classic “The Last Dragon”, Shidoshi Glen Perry, Shidoshi GJ Torres (Founder of the Torres Hei-Long System) and many more.

== Awards and honors ==
- Black Belt Magazine, 2002 Instructor of the Year
- International Sports Hall of Fame, Class of 2022.

== Film career ==
Ron Van Clief's first acting job came when he was selected to star in the 1974 Hong Kong film The Black Dragon (aka Super Dragon) opposite Jason Pai Piao. Some of his film roles during the 1970s were Blaxploitation films which capitalized on the then-novelty of an African-American martial artist, following in the tradition of Jim Kelly's role in Enter the Dragon. He starred alongside Leo Fong in a Filipino action film called Bamboo Trap in 1975. Van Clief's film roles earned him the nickname "The Black Dragon", and the name inspired the titles of his films The Black Dragon's Revenge (aka The Black Dragon Revenges the Death of Bruce Lee) (1975) and Way of the Black Dragon (1979). He appeared in the 1977 Italian crime film The Squeeze opposite Lee Van Cleef and Karen Black, and also traveled to South Korea and Taiwan to co-star in Kung Fu Finger Book with Dragon Lee.

In the mid-1980s, Van Clief would later become the fight choreographer for the film The Last Dragon.

Ron Van Clief performed various voice-over roles for the international television series titled Kung Faux.

He was a member of the Screen Actors Guild for over 3 decades.

== Mixed martial arts record ==
Professional record breakdown
1 match	0 wins	1 loss
By knockout	0	0
By submission	0	1
By decision	0	0

Res.	Record	Opponent	Method	Event	Date	Round	Time	Location	Notes
Loss	0–1	Royce Gracie	Submission (rear naked choke)	UFC 4	December 16, 1994	1	3:49	Tulsa, Oklahoma, United States	

== Bibliography ==
- Manual of The Martial Arts (1981)
- Ron Van Clief White Belt Guide Book (1984)
- Ron Van Clief Green and Purple Belt Guide Book (1984)
- The Black Heroes of The Martial Arts (1995)
- The Hanged Man: The Story of Ron Van Clief (2012)
