= Livingston High School =

Livingston High School may refer to the following institutions in the United States:

- Livingston High School (Alabama), Livingston, Alabama
- Livingston High School (California), Livingston, California
- Livingston High School (New Jersey), Livingston, New Jersey
- Livingston High School (Texas), Livingston, Texas
- Livingston Central High School in Smithland, Kentucky
