= UFC 15 =

UFC mixed martial arts event in 1997

UFC 15: Collision Course
- The poster for UFC 15: Collision Course
- Promotion: Ultimate Fighting Championship
- Date: October 17, 1997
- Venue: Casino Magic Bay St. Louis
- City: Bay St. Louis, Mississippi

Event chronology
UFC 14: Showdown	UFC 15: Collision Course	UFC Japan: Ultimate Japan

UFC 15: Collision Course was a mixed martial arts event held by the Ultimate Fighting Championship on October 17, 1997, in Bay St. Louis, Mississippi. The event was seen live on pay-per-view in the United States, and later released on home video.

== History ==
UFC 15 was headlined by a UFC Heavyweight Championship bout between Maurice Smith and Tank Abbott. Abbott was brought in as a last-minute replacement for Dan Severn, who couldn't fight because of an injured hand.

UFC 15 featured a Superfight between Randy Couture and Vitor Belfort, a Heavyweight Tournament, and two alternate bouts. The Superfight was billed as a Heavyweight Title Elimination bout, meaning the winner would advance to compete for the UFC Heavyweight Championship at the next event, UFC Japan.

The show also marked the last event to feature Bruce Beck, who had been the main play-by-play announcer starting with UFC 4. He was replaced by Mike Goldberg in UFC Japan.

Collision Course marked a major change in the UFC's rules, with limitations set on permissible striking areas. Headbutts, groin strikes, strikes to the back of the neck and head, knees to a downed opponent, head stomps, kicks to a downed opponent, small joint manipulation, and hair pulling all became officially illegal.

During the pre-fight introductions for Kerr v Stott, the video feed focused on a group of spectators in the crowd. One of them was a shirtless fan covered in body paint saying "Just Bleed". He later became a popular symbol of the MMA community and the early years of the sport in general.

== Results ==
Heavyweight Championship
Weight class				Method	Round	Time	Notes
Heavyweight	Maurice Smith (c)	def.	Tank Abbott	TKO (leg kicks)		8:08	(Note: For the UFC Heavyweight Championship.)
Heavyweight Superfight
Heavyweight	Randy Couture	def.	Vitor Belfort	TKO (punches)		8:16
Finals
Heavyweight	Mark Kerr	def.	Dwayne Cason	Submission (rear-naked choke)		0:53	(Note: Cason replaced Dave Beneteau who could not continue due to fatigue.)
Semifinals
Heavyweight	Mark Kerr	def.	Greg Stott	KO (knee)		0:17
Heavyweight	Dave Beneteau	def.	Carlos Barreto	Decision (unanimous)		15:00	(Note: Due to fatigue, Beneteau was unable to continue in the tournament.)
Alternate bouts
Heavyweight	Alex Hunter	def.	Harry Moskowitz	Decision (split)		12:00
Heavyweight	Dwayne Cason	def.	Houston Dorr	TKO (punches)		3:43

== UFC 15 Heavyweight Tournament Bracket ==
Semifinals
(United States) Mark Kerr	KO
(United States) Greg Stott	0:17
(Canada) Dave Beneteau	DEC
(Brazil) Carlos Barreto	15:00

Finals
(United States) Mark Kerr	SUB
(United States) Dwayne Cason^{1}	0:53

^{1} Dwayne Cason replaced Dave Beneteau who withdrew due to fatigue.

== Encyclopedia awards ==
The following fighters were honored in the October 2011 book titled UFC Encyclopedia.

- Fight of the Night: Randy Couture vs. Vitor Belfort
- Knockout of the Night: Mark Kerr def. Greg Stott
- Submission of the Night: Mark Kerr def. Dwayne Cason

== See also ==
- Ultimate Fighting Championship
- List of UFC champions
- List of UFC events
- 1997 in UFC
