= Jon Hess (fighter) =

American mixed martial arts (MMA) fighter

- Born: 1969 (age 56–57); Encinitas, California, U.S.
- Other names: The Giant With Attitude
- Height: 6 ft 7 in (2.01 m)
- Weight: 245 lb (111 kg; 17.5 st)
- Reach: 82.0 in (208 cm)
- Fighting out of: Murrieta, California
- Rank: Black belt in Kung Fu; Black Belt in Karate; Black Belt in Jujutsu

Mixed martial arts record
- Total: 2
- Wins: 1
- By knockout: 1
- Losses: 1
- By knockout: 1

Other information
- Mixed martial arts record from Sherdog

Jon Hess (born 1969) is an American martial artist, early mixed martial arts competitor and the co-founder of the Scientifically Aggressive Fighting Technology of America, or S.A.F.T.A., a martial art with roots in San Soo Kung Fu.

Hess, along with S.A.F.T.A. co-founder Lew Hicks, were students of Jerry Peterson, the founder of S.C.A.R.S. They took their San Soo Kung Fu black belt test together in 1993, and Hicks was chosen by Hess to corner him for the UFC.

Hess's mixed martial arts debut came in the Ultimate Fighting Championship 5 tournament, where he defeated Andy Anderson by TKO. The fight is regarded as one of the dirtiest in UFC history, and Hess was ultimately fined $2,000 for two violations of the rules against eye gouging. Hess has defended his actions, citing that "The UFC billed itself as no rules," and therefore there were no rules to break. However, despite the marketing slogan, early UFC events did have a limited list of forbidden techniques, though infractions could only result in a fine. After victory over Anderson, Hess withdrew from the tournament with a hand injury.

After his appearance in the UFC, Hess struggled to find another fight, despite publicly challenging dominant early UFC competitor Royce Gracie. Hess believes that this is because he was blacklisted by UFC promoter Art Davie. After an attempt to gain public support for a return to the UFC via opinions published in Inside Kung Fu magazine, Hess fought Vitor Belfort at SB 2-SuperBrawl 2, where he lost by KO in 12 seconds. Hess has not fought professionally since this loss, but has stated he took the Belfort fight on short notice, that if he was allowed to come back he would be "world champ", and that Belfort was "on steroids" when he beat him.

On April 25, 2010 Hess cornered Team Quest fighter Steven Tobias at Gladiator Challenge, where Tobias won his first pro fight. Since 2007, Hess has made several efforts to get into fighting shape and has suffered a number of injuries, including breaking three toes and an ankle.

== Career accomplishments ==
=== Mixed martial arts ===
- Ultimate Fighting Championship
  - UFC Encyclopedia Awards
    - Knockout of the Night (One time) vs. Andy Anderson

== Mixed martial arts record ==
Professional record breakdown
2 matches	1 win	1 loss
By knockout	1	1
By submission	0	0
By decision	0	0

Res.	Record	Opponent	Method	Event	Date	Round	Time	Location	Notes
Loss	1–1	Vitor Belfort	KO (punches)	SuperBrawl 2	October 11, 1996	1	0:12	Honolulu, Hawaii, United States	
Win	1–0	Andy Anderson	TKO (punches)	UFC 5	April 7, 1995	1	1:23	Charlotte, North Carolina, United States	
