= Frank Ruiz =

Peruvian footballer (born 1966)

Frank Ruíz
Personal information
- Full name: Frank Ricardo Ruíz Uceda
- Date of birth: 30 November 1966 (age 59)
- Place of birth: Ica, Peru
- Height: 1.78 m (5 ft 10 in)
- Position: Defender

Senior career*
Years	Team	Apps	(Gls)
- Unión Huaral
1993–1998	Alianza Lima		
1998–1999	Veria	13	(0)
2001	Deportivo Municipal		
- * Club domestic league appearances and goals

Frank Ricardo Ruíz Uceda (born 30 November 1966, in Ica) is a former Peruvian footballer.

== Club career ==
Ruíz played for most of his career with Alianza Lima in the Primera Division Peruana. He also had a spell with Veria in the Super League Greece.
