= Extremists (professional wrestling) =

Professional wrestling tag team

Tag team
- Members: Devon Storm; Ace Darling
- Billed heights: Storm: 6 ft 1 in (1.85 m); Darling: 6 ft 0 in (1.83 m)
- Combined billed weight: 470 lb (210 kg)
- Billed from: New Jersey
- Debut: 1992
- Disbanded: March 4, 2006
- Years active: 1992-1999, 2005-2006

The Extremists was a professional wrestling tag team consisting of Devon Storm and Ace Darling. The tag team wrestled in the World Wrestling Federation (WWF) and several independent promotions, many of which were National Wrestling Alliance (NWA) territories.

== History ==
=== Independent circuit (1992–1999) ===
Devon Storm and Ace Darling started their professional wrestling careers in the early 1990s and formed a tag team called the Extremist to wrestle in the indies. Their earliest stint recorded was in East Coast Pro Wrestling (ECPW), where the two defeated Kodiak Bear and Damian Stone for the ECPW Tag Team Championship during the early 1990s. They lost the titles to The New Blackjacks. They left ECPW afterwards and joined Century Wrestling Alliance (CWA), winning the CWA Tag Team Championship on July 24, 1996, by defeating The Public Enemy (Johnny Grunge and Rocco Rock).

While holding the CWA Tag Team Titles, the Extremists also wrestled in Richmond Championship Wrestling (RCW), where they won the RCW Tag Team Championship on August 10, 1997, by defeating Thunderstorm (Matt Storm and Jimmy Jack Thunder). They lost the CWA Tag Team Titles to The Brotherhood (Knuckles Nelson and Eric Sbraccia) on October 18, 1997. While still holding the RCW Tag Team Titles, the Extremists wrestled in NWA's New Jersey territory, where they defeated The Misfits (Harley Lewis and Derek Domino) for the New Jersey–based NWA United States Tag Team Championship. On March 3, 1998, Extremists were stripped of their commitments with National Wrestling Alliance (NWA) and Century Wrestling Alliance, and as a result, were stripped by the RCW Tag Team Titles.

However, they still kept the United States Tag Team Titles and were defeated for the championships on March 22 by the Misfits. On October 24, Extremists defeated The Misfits (Harley Lewis and Lupus) for the NWA 2000 Tag Team Championship. While holding the 2000 Tag Team Titles, they joined East Coast Wrestling Association (ECWA) and won the ECWA Tag Team Championship by defeating Lance Diamond and Cheetah Master on November 28. They lost the ECWA Tag Team Titles to Christian York and Mark Schraeder. They still kept the 2000 Tag Team Championship until the championship retired in January 1999.

=== World Wrestling Federation (1997–1999) ===
While wrestling on the independent circuit, the Extremists also wrestled as enhancement talents in the World Wrestling Federation (WWF) from 1997 to 1999. During their tenure in WWF, Storm and Darling even had a match against each other on July 28, 1997, edition of Raw is War, which Storm won. Later that year, Storm also participated in a tournament to determine the first-ever WWF Light Heavyweight Champion and was defeated by eventual winner, Taka Michinoku in the quarterfinals on November 10 edition of Raw is War. Extremists continued to wrestle as enhancement talents from 1997 to 1999 when Storm left WWF to join World Championship Wrestling (WCW).

=== East Coast Wrestling Association (2005–2006) ===
Storm became a successful wrestler in WCW under the ring name Crowbar, ending his tag team with Darling. On the other hand, Darling continued to wrestle in independent promotions. After WCW was purchased by WWF in 2001, Storm wrestled in the short-lived promotion World Wrestling All-Stars (WWA) and the upstart promotion Total Nonstop Action Wrestling (TNA) before returning to the independent circuit. On December 3, 2005, Storm and Darling reunited their tag team after Darling wrestled Fred Sampson for the ECWA Heavyweight Championship. The duo teamed up twice after their reunion. The first was on January 28, 2006, against The Valedictorians (Billy Bax and Rob Eckos) in a losing effort. The second teaming was on March 4, when they were defeated against Valedictorians in a rematch. After this match, the team disbanded as both members went their separate ways.

== Championships and accomplishments ==
- Century Wrestling Alliance
  - CWA Tag Team Championship (1 time)
- East Coast Pro Wrestling
  - ECPW Tag Team Championship (1 time)
- East Coast Wrestling Association
  - ECWA Tag Team Championship (1 time)
- Eternity Wrestling Association
  - EWA Tag Team Championship (1 time)
- NWA 2000
  - NWA 2000 Tag Team Championship (1 time)
- NWA New Jersey
  - NWA United States Tag Team Championship (New Jersey version) (1 time)
- Richmond Championship Wrestling
  - RCW Tag Team Championship (1 time)
