= NWA United States Tag Team Championship =

Professional wrestling tag team championship series

The NWA United States Tag Team Championship is a name used for several secondary tag team championship used by various National Wrestling Alliance (NWA) members since 1958. There are eleven different versions of the NWA United States Tag Team Championships have been promoted in various regions across the United States, starting with the Midwest Wrestling Association version in 1950, to the NWA Lightning One version that is active today.

The NWA's bylaws allowed any NWA member, also known as NWA territories, to create and control their own version of the NWA United States Tag Team Championship. The most well known version of the NWA United States Tag Team Championship was the Jim Crockett Promotions version that later became known as the WCW United States Tag Team Championship. As it is a professional wrestling championship, it is not won or lost competitively but instead by the decision of the bookers of a wrestling promotion. The title is awarded after the chosen team wins a match to maintain the illusion that professional wrestling is a competitive sport.

== Championship history ==
The National Wrestling Alliance (NWA) was founded in 1948 after six professional wrestling promoters decided to join together and form a governing body to oversee the various members, later referred to as the NWA territories. The NWA Board of Directors agreed to all recognize one over all NWA World Heavyweight Championship and one NWA World Junior Heavyweight Championship across all promotions. Beyond those two championships the Board allowed each promotion to create and promote whatever championship they wanted to. In 1949 the first of many NWA World Tag Team Championships was created in the Los Angeles territory. In the 1950s tag team wrestling became more popular across the US, which led to the introduction of various "second tier" championships promoted locally as the "American Tag Team Championship" or the "National Tag Team Championship". In 1950 the Midwest Wrestling Association, the NWA member promoting in and around Ohio, introduced Jack Kennedy and Lucky Simunovich as the American Tag Team Championship, only to later bill the same championship as both the National Tag Team Championship and the United States Tag Team Championship between 1950 and 1963 where the promotion closed.

In 1958, Capitol Wrestling Corporation (CWC) out of New York introduced their own NWA United States Tag Team Championship when Mark Lewin and Don Curtis defeated Hans Schmidt and Dick the Bruiser in the finals of a tournament to determine the first champions. In 1963, the CWC version was renamed the WWWF United States Tag Team Championship when CWC seceded from the NWA and was rebranded as the World Wide Wrestling Federation (WWWF, now known as WWE). A third U.S. tag team championship was introduced in Florida in 1961 as Championship Wrestling from Florida (CWF) introduced the Florida version of the U.S. tag team championship. The Fabulous Kangaroos (Al Costello and Roy Heffernan) were the first Florida based U.S. tag team champions as they were awarded the championship prior to their debut in the territory. The Florida version of the championship was the longest promoted U.S. championship as it was actively promoted from 1961 until 1986 where the CWF promotion closed.

In 1962 two additional versions of the championship were introduced, the NWA Mid-America version and the NWA Tri-State version. The Mid-America version was created by promoter Nick Gulas and defended in the Tennessee/Alabama promotion NWA Mid-America, starting with the Japanese duo of Yoshinosato and Taru Sakuro being billed as champions when they arrived in NWA Mid-America. There were at least 34 different reigns in the history of the championship, ending with The Bicentennial Kings (Phil Hickerson and Dennis Condrey) as champions in 1976 where the championship was abandoned. The Tri-Star version was created by promoters Leroy McGuirk, Jack Curtis and Aurelian Smith and promoted in the NWA Tri-State territory that covered Oklahoma, Arkansas and Louisiana. Jan Madrid and Louie Tillet are credited with being the first champions, but records are unclear on how they became champions. In 1980 the championship was renamed the "NWA Tri-State Tag Team Championship" and then abandoned in 1981 when McGuirk sold his promotion to Bill Watts, becoming Mid-South Wrestling.

The Dirty Daltons (Jack Dalton and Jim Dalton) were the first Gulf Coast U.S. Tag Team Champions when Gulf Coast Championship Wrestling (GCCW) introduced it as a secondary championship in the promotion after the NWA Gulf Coast Tag Team Championship. On April 15, 1974 then-reigning champions Bob Kelly and Rocket Monroe lost the Gulf Coast version to the then-reigning NWA Tri-State United States Tag Team Champions Bob Sweetan and Siegfried Stanke to unify the two championships. the following year the Dallas, Texas–based Big Time Wrestling introduced the Texas version of the championship as Al Costello and Karl Von Brauner (known as "The Internationals") won a tournament to become the first Texas based U.S. Tag Team Champions. In 1967 the championship was renamed the NWA American Tag Team Championship instead and would later become the World Class Championship Wrestling World Tag Team Championship.

In 1986 the Charlotte, North Carolina–based Jim Crockett Promotions began expanding their territory as it absorbed several NWA territories that had been struggling financially. As part of the expansion JCP introduced their version of the U.S. Tag Team Championship, holding a 10-team tag team tournament. Krusher Kruschev and Ivan Koloff defeated The Kansas Jayhawks (Dutch Mantell and Bobby Jaggers) to become the inaugural champions. Later JCP would be sold to Ted Turner and become known as World Championship Wrestling, which led to the championship being given the WCW prefix.

By the late 1980s the NWA was no longer the powerful organization it had been between 1948 and the mid-1980s, becoming a conglomerate of smaller promotions. In 1996 NWA Jersey introduced their NWA United States Tag Team Championship when Yar and Wolf (also known as The Lost Boys) won a three-way match for the new championship. The last recorded defense of the New Jersey version happened in 2000. In 2014 NWA Southern All-Star Wrestling introduced the most recent NWA U.S. Tag Team Championship that was defended in and around the Tennessee area. It would later also be promoted by NWA Smoky Mountain Wrestling. The first champions were The Lords of KAOS (Damien Wayne and Lance Erickson) who won the championship by defeating Jason Kinkaid and Charles Alexander in the finals of a tournament.

On July 19, 2022, Billy Corgan announced that the NWA is reviving the United States Tag Team Championship after nearly five years of inactivity. The Fixers won a twelve-team battle royal to become the new champions on August 28, 2022. The first set of NWA United States Tag Team Championship belts were similar to the old belts from Championship Wrestling from Florida but in October 2022 Corgan introduced a new design which is similar to the Detroit version of the NWA United States Heavyweight Championship.

== List of NWA United States Tag Team Championships ==
Created	Ended	Promotion	Fate	Ref
1950	1963	Midwest Wrestling Association	Retired when the promotion folded	
1958	1967	Capitol Wrestling Corporation	Became the WWWF United States Tag Team Championship in 1963, vacancy left unfilled 1967	
1961	1986	Championship Wrestling from Florida	Retired when the promotion folded	
1962	1976	NWA Mid-America	Retired when the promotion folded	
1962	1980	NWA Tri-State	Renamed NWA Tri-State Tag Team Championship	
1965	1974	Gulf Coast Championship Wrestling	Merged with the Tri-State version	
1966	1967	Big Time Wrestling	Renamed NWA American Tag Team Championship	
1986	1992	Jim Crockett Promotions	Became the WCW United States Tag Team Championship in 1991, decommissioned by WCW vice president Bill Watts July 1992	
1996	2000	NWA Jersey	Abandoned	
2014	2017	NWA Smoky Mountain Wrestling	renamed the Innovate Wrestling United States Tag Team Championship	
2022		National Wrestling Alliance	Revived under the Lightning One version with The Fixers (Jay Bradley and Wrecking Ball Legursky) becoming the new champions	

== See also ==
- List of National Wrestling Alliance championships
