= Lost Boys (professional wrestling) =

Professional wrestling tag team

The Lost Boys

Tag team
- Members: Yar; Wolf; Angel (manager – TCW); Doc Diamond (manager – DWF)
- Name: The Lost Boyz
- Billed heights: Yar: 5 ft 11 in (1.80 m); Wolf: 6 ft 0 in (1.83 m)
- Combined billed weight: 440 lb (200 kg); Yar: 230 lb (100 kg); Wolf: 210 lb (95 kg)
- Billed from: "The streets of South Jersey"; Philadelphia, Pennsylvania
- Debut: 1995
- Disbanded: 1998

The Lost Boys were a professional wrestling tag team composed of Yar (Raymond Gajtkowski, March 5, 1971 – September 1, 2021) and Wolf (Daniel Wolfe, June 30, 1972 – February 2, 2011). They competed in numerous independent promotions throughout the East Coast and Northeastern United States during the 1990s. One of the rising stars of the National Wrestling Alliance, they became the first NWA United States Tag Team Champions since 1991 when the title was revived by NWA New Jersey. They also challenged The Misfits (Derrick Domino, Harley Lewis, and Lupus) for the NWA World Six-Man Tag Team Championship, another abandoned NWA title, when it was briefly revived by NWA 2000 in 1998.

From 1995 to 1998, Yar and Wolf appeared in Chris Lash's Allied Powers Wrestling Federation, Extreme Championship Wrestling, Grande Wrestling Alliance, International Pro Wrestling, Jersey All-Pro Wrestling, Liberty All-Star Wrestling, New Jack City Wrestling, and Tri-County Wrestling.

In 2004, The Lost Boys reunited in Doc Diamond's Devastation Wrestling Federation where they won the DWF Tag Team Championship. They remained with the promotion when it became part of Wrestle Reality, a "pro wrestling conglomerate" also including American Wrestlers Fund Raisers, Doc Diamond's DWF Devastation Wrestling Federation and Doc Diamond's Devastation University, Doc Diamonds DWF/Loco.Pro Wrestling Unplugged, where they held both the DWF and Loco Wrestling Tag Team Championships.

== History ==
=== Early years ===
Both natives of Philadelphia, Pennsylvania, Yar and Wolf both began wrestling for local promotions in 1995. Yar was trained by Larry Sharpe and Doc Diamond at the famed "Monster Factory" while Wolf attended the Tri-State Wrestling Alliance's wrestling school. The two reportedly met while working out at a local gym and became workout partners. They ultimately decided to start teaming together as The Lost Boys in the summer of 1995. The team made their official debut defeating The Brothers of East L.A., which were affiliated with Doc Diamond, in Philadelphia-based Liberty All-Star Wrestling. A few months later they were brought into Tri-County Wrestling by Angel, Which was affiliated with Doc Diamond, a former valet for Extreme Championship Wrestling, and won a championship tournament for the promotion's tag team titles in September 1995. The Lost Boys defended the tag titles for at least seven months.

=== National Wrestling Alliance (1995–1997) ===
Near the end of 1995, The Lost Boys, Managed by Doc Diamond, joined the National Wrestling Alliance. One of their first matches, Yar and Wolf fought East L.A. to a double-countout in Woodbury, New Jersey, on October 28. They also wrestled on one of the last "NWA Sabu" shows which was held in Yardville, New Jersey, on December 30, 1995. On February 3, 1996, they represented List of National Wrestling Alliance territories Doc Diamonds NWA New Jersey at the first Eddie Gilbert Memorial Brawl in Cherry Hill, New Jersey, where they defeated Bad Attitude (Seek and Destroy) managed by Doc Diamond and The Greek Connection (Gus the Greek and Jimmy Londos) in a Triangle match to win the NWA United States Tag Team Championship. With this victory, The Lost Boys were not only NWA New Jersey's first-ever tag team champions but the first team to hold the NWA U.S. Tag Team Championship since the original title was abandoned by World Championship Wrestling five years earlier. After a near three-month reign, The Lost Boys lost the belts to Bad Attitude, managed by Doc Diamond, in Yardville, New Jersey on April 27, 1996. In spite of their loss, The Lost Boys continued to rack up victories. On May 10, they defeated Ghetto Blaster and Psychotron at Lodi High School. They also won matches against The Greek Connection, The Misfits (Derrick Domino and Harley Lewis), and Ralph Soto & Rasta the Voodoo Man. On November 22, Lost Boy Yar wrestled Larry Winters for a UWWA show at Westaby Hall in Fairless Hills, Pennsylvania. The Lost Boys managed to regain the tag title from Twiggy Ramirez and Madonna Wayne Gacy, substituting for Ramirez' regular partner Adrian Hall, in Mount Holly at the end of the year but dropped them back to Hall and Ramirez in Paulsboro, New Jersey, on March 8, 1997. The team also made appearances in Doug Flex's International Pro Wrestling, however, their feuds with Bad Attitude and Doc Diamond and The Hellriders kept them busy in the NWA. In addition, The Lost Boys occasionally returned to Tri-County Wrestling to wrestle teams such as PG-13 (J. C. Ice and Wolfie D) and Twiggy Ramirez & Onyx Dahmer.

"The Lost Boys aren't a typical streetfighting tag team. They combine brawling with uncanny quickness and very good aerial skills. Their finisher is the Generation X Jam, a move that has Yar hoisting their victim onto his shoulders, and Wolf executing a moonsault that sends the opponent crashing to the mat."

— Dave Rosenbaum, The Wrestler (1996)

The Lost Boys enjoyed a high-profile during their career in the NWA and were considered one of the organization's rising stars. The team was featured in the professional wrestling magazine The Wrestler where columnist Dave Rosenbaum discussed the team's background and early career. Their in-ring style, an unusual blend of high-flying maneuvers and "hardcore" street brawling, was also praised by the publication. With Yar as the powerhouse of the team and Wolf performing aerial moves, NWA promoter Dennis Coralluzzo and Doc Diamond claimed that the team possessed "a real mean streak". Both Yar and Wolf were ranked in Pro Wrestling Illustrated's "PWI 500" two years in a row; their rankings were #327 and #334 in 1996 and #368 and #376 in 1997 respectively.

=== Independent circuit (1997–1998) ===
Although the majority of their career was spent in the NWA, The Lost Boys also made appearances in Chris Lash's Allied Powers Wrestling Federation, Doc Diamonds DWF Devastation Wrestling Federation, Doc Diamonds WWSA World Wrestling Stars Alliance, Doc Diamonds NWA Over The Top, Grande Wrestling Alliance, New Jack City Wrestling, and elsewhere on the East Coast and Mid-Atlantic independent circuit. The team defeated The Misfits (Harley Lewis and Psychotron) for the NJCW Tag Team Championship in June 1996. They also had a brief stint in Extreme Championship Wrestling in early-1997 but departed after losses to The F.B.I. (Little Guido and Tracy Smothers) and Axl Rotten & Corporal Punishment. After losing the NWA U.S. Tag Team Championship to Downward Spinal that spring, Wolf and Yar began wrestling on a semi-regular basis for Jersey All-Pro Wrestling. The Lost Boys broke up for a short time after a falling out in mid-1997. While Yar searched for a replacement, Wolf attempted a singles career wrestling in various East Coast promotions. Wolf briefly teamed with former adversary Twiggy Ramirez, however, their partnership ended after losing a tag team match. The two men later wrestled each other at IWA Mid-South's "Extreme Heaven" show in Louisville, Kentucky, on July 19, 1997. Four days later in NJCW, Wolf and Don Montoya won a three-way tag team match against J.R. Ryder & Lupus and Overweight Lover & Twiggy Ramirez in West Long Branch, New Jersey. On July 25, Lost Boy Wolf and J.R. Styles lost to The East LA Angels in a JAPW elimination match. The Lost Boys eventually reformed in JAPW. On September 12, 1997, The Lost Boys wrestled ECW's Jason Knight and Pitbull#2 in Bayonne, New Jersey. On February 6, 1998, Wolf and Kane D wrestled to a double countout at JAPW's "Valentine's Day Massacre". Two weeks later, The Lost Boys teamed with Slayer to challenge The Misfits (Derrick Domino, Harley Lewis, and Lupus) for the NWA World Six-Man Tag Team Championship at Overbrook High School in Pine Hill, New Jersey. The team lost the match when Lupus pinned Wolf. The title had been revived by NWA 2000 after the original title had been abandoned by Jim Crockett Promotions a decade earlier. Had Wolf and Yar won the match, it would have been the second revived NWA title won by the team.

The following month, Yar and J.R. Ryder defeated The Haas Brothers (Charlie and Russ Haas) at JAPW's "Night Of The Barbwire 2" in Newark, New Jersey. On May 8, Yar lost to Rik Ratchet (with Donnie B. and The Master) for an NWA New Jersey show in Blackwood, New Jersey; his opponent used brass knuckles to score a pinfall. On May 20, 1998, in one of their last JAPW appearances, Wolf and Yar wrestled The Skyscrapers (Mega and Slugger) to a double-countout in Bayonne, New Jersey. Three days later, The Lost Boys and Karetaker lost a 6-man tag team match to Bad Attitude w/ Doc Diamond, Lord Zieg, and Bobby Blake for Doc Diamonds World Wrestling Stars Alliance show in Bordentown, New Jersey. The team quietly disbanded later that year and went into retirement. On December 17, 1999, Wolf made a final JAPW appearance in a singles match against Lord Zieg at "Season's Beatings" in Bayonne, New Jersey.

=== Reunion (2008–2009) ===
Ten years after their breakup, The Lost Boys reunited in Doc Diamond's Devastation Wrestling Federation. In 2004 Icon Doc Diamond bought Devastation University and Devastation Wrestling Federation from the legend King Kong Bundy. On July 19, 2008, Wolf defeated Das Ubermachin #1 via disqualification at the DWF's "Stars Stripes & Wrestle IV". His former tag team partner Yar unexpectedly came out at the end of the bout and together they challenged Das Ubermachin in a match for the DWF Tag Team Championship, which they won later that night. The Lost Boys made their first title defense against KJ Hellfire and Rockin' Rebel at Pro Wrestling Unplugged's "Family Reunion" a week later. The Lost Boys Wolf and Yar w/ Doc Diamond won the match when their opponents were disqualified for using fireballs. That summer, Doc Diamonds Devastation Wrestling Federation and DWF/Loco merged with American Wrestlers Fund Raisers, Loco Wrestling and Pro Wrestling Unplugged to form a "pro wrestling conglomerate" known as WrestleReality. The group signed a national syndication deal via internet television website TVByDemand.com, which was to begin airing shows in 85 cities later that year. On August 9, The Lost Boys w/ Doc Diamond wrestled on Loco Wrestling's first-ever show, "Loco Invasion" @ Doc Diamonds Devastation University DWF Arena, against AWFR Tag Team Champions X'ed (Warlock and Slayer) in an impromptu title bout. Outside interference from The Latin Connection (Downtown Raphael, El Monstro and D-Crazed) near the end of the match initially saw The Lost Boys awarded the AWFR titles. The decision was quickly reversed, however, on the orders of DC Lurie and the team was forced to return the belts. The Lost Boys, accompanied by Doc Diamond, faced The Latin Connection (D'crazed and Monstro) weeks later at WrestleReality's Clementon Amusement Park show where they fought to a double-disqualification. A rematch was held at The Flyers Skate Zone in Voorhees, New Jersey, on September 27, 2008 Doc Diamond and The Lost Boys got their revenge post to post, an overwhelming victory. On January 24, 2009, The Lost Boys w/ Doc Diamond defeated The Latin Connection and The Latin Revolution at "Corky's Loco Birthday Gets Devastated" @ Doc Diamond's Devastation University DWF Arena to win both the DWF and Loco Wrestling Tag Team Championship. On February 21, Lost Boy Yar and D-Crazed joined forces with Doc Diamond at "Resurrection II" to successfully defend the Loco Wrestling Tag Team Titles against Alberto Libre, Jr. and Damien Pain; D-Crazed had stepped in as a last minute replacement for Wolf. On March 7, The Lost Boys w/ Doc Diamond defeated The Latin Revolution and Dark Karnival at "You Owe Us" in a three-way tag team match. On September 26, 2009, The Lost Boys w/ Doc Diamond attempted to win back the DWF/Loco Wrestling tag titles from Bad Karma at "Locked and Loaded" [@ Doc Diamonds Devastation University DWF Arena, Pennsauken, New Jersey]], but both teams ended up being counted out.

Lost Boy Wolf, born Daniel W. Wolfe, died on February 2, 2011, at the age of 38, while Lost Boy Yar, born Raymond Gajtkowski, died on September 1, 2021, at the age of 50.

== Championships and accomplishments ==
- Devastation Wrestling Federation
  - DWF Tag Team Championship (1 time)
- Loco Wrestling
  - Loco Wrestling Tag Team Championship (1 time)
- National Wrestling Alliance
  - NWA United States Tag Team Championship (2 times, first)
  - Doc Diamonds NWA Tag Team championship
- WWSA Doc Diamonds World Wrestling Stars Alliance Tag team champions
- New Jack City Wrestling
  - NJCW Tag Team Championship (1 time)
- Tri-County Wrestling
  - TCW Tag Team Championship (1 time)
- Pro Wrestling Illustrated
  - PWI ranked Yar # 327 of the 500 best singles wrestlers of the PWI 500 in 1996
  - PWI ranked Wolf # 334 of the 500 best singles wrestlers of the PWI 500 in 1996
  - PWI ranked Yar # 368 of the 500 best singles wrestlers of the PWI 500 in 1997
  - PWI ranked Wolf # 376 of the 500 best singles wrestlers of the PWI 500 in 1997
