= The Fight Within =

The Fight Within may refer to:

- The Fight Within (film), a 2016 American Christian sports film
- The Fight Within (album), a 2017 album by iskwē
