= Extremist (disambiguation) =

An extremist is a proponent of extremism.

Extremist may also refer to:

- Political fringe movements
- The Extremists (professional wrestling), a professional wrestling tag team
- Extremists (comics), a team of supervillains in DC Comics Justice League titles
- The Extremist (comics), a four-issue comic book mini-series
- Extremist (album), Demon Hunter album
- The Extremist, Joe Satriani album and title track
- Extremist (film), a 2025 Russian short drama
