= Skip Hall =

Skip Hall may refer to:

- Skip Hall (American football) (born 1944), American football coach
- Skip Hall (martial artist) (born 1948), American martial artist
- Skip Hall (musician) (1909–1980), American musician
