= Dan Severn =

American wrestler and mixed martial arts fighter (born 1958)

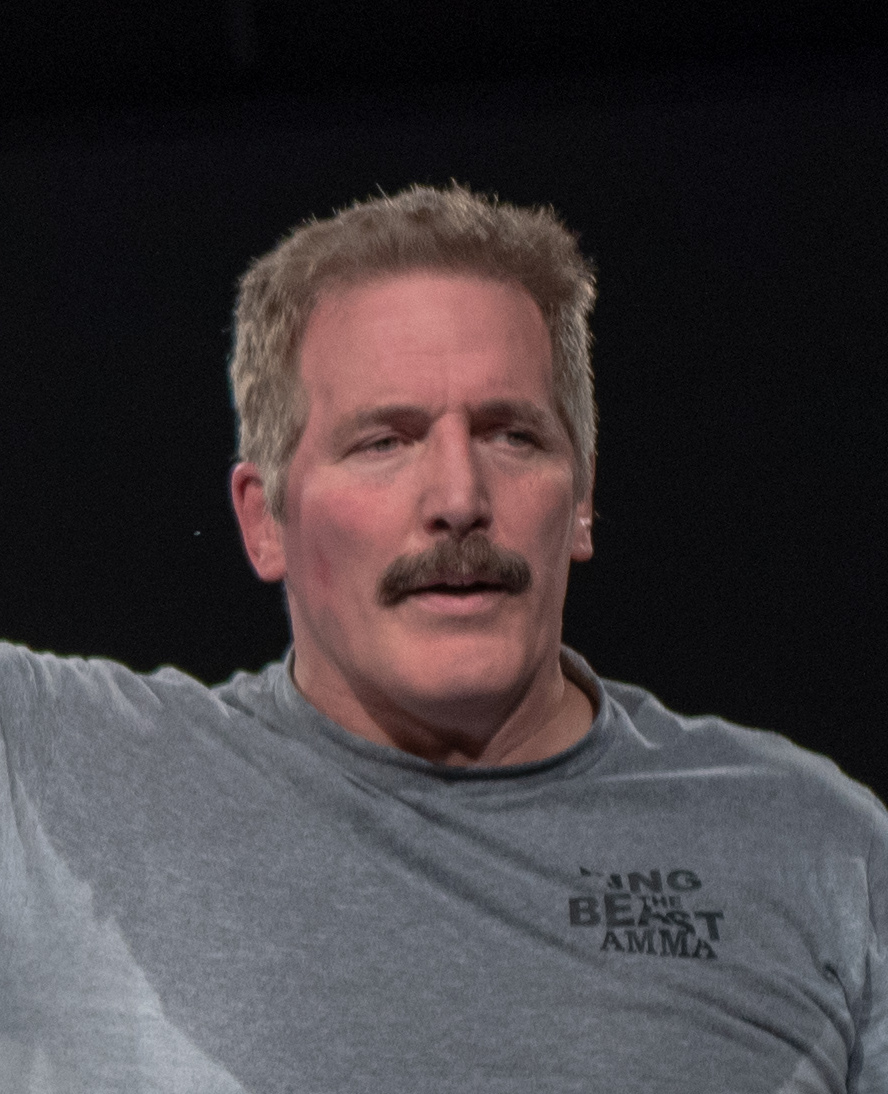
- Severn in 2019
- Born: Daniel DeWayne Severn; June 8, 1958 (age 68); Coldwater, Michigan, U.S.
- Other names: The Beast
- Height: 6 ft 2 in (188 cm)
- Weight: 253 lb (115 kg; 18 st 1 lb)
- Division: Heavyweight; Openweight
- Style: Wrestling
- Stance: Southpaw
- Fighting out of: Montrose, Michigan
- Rank: 5th Dan Black Belt in Judo; 2nd Dan Black Belt in Jujutsu
- Wrestling: Two-time NCAA Division I All-American, Olympic alternate 1984, 1988
- Years active: 1991–present (Professional wrestling); 1994–2013 (MMA)

Mixed martial arts record
- Total: 127
- Wins: 101
- By knockout: 23
- By submission: 54
- By decision: 24
- Losses: 19
- By knockout: 4
- By submission: 8
- By decision: 7
- Draws: 7

Other information
- University: Arizona State University
- Spouse: Rhiannon Severn
- Website: dansevern.com
- Mixed martial arts record from Sherdog
Medal record
Representing the United States
Men's freestyle wrestling
World Cup
Gold medal – first place	1986 Toledo	100 kg
World Super Championships
Silver medal – second place	1985 Tokyo	100 kg
Pan American Championships
Gold medal – first place	1986 Colorado Springs	100 kg
Junior World Championships
Gold medal – first place	1977 Las Vegas	90 kg
Collegiate Wrestling
Representing the Arizona State Sun Devils
NCAA Division I Championships
Silver medal – second place	1980 Corvallis	190 lb
- Professional wrestling career
- Ring names: Dan Severn; The Beast
- Billed height: 6 ft 2 in (1.88 m)
- Billed weight: 250 lb (113 kg)
- Billed from: Flint, Michigan
- Trained by: Al Snow
- Debut: 1992

Daniel DeWayne Severn (born June 8, 1958), nicknamed "the Beast", is an American retired professional wrestler, mixed martial artist and amateur wrestler. A UFC Hall of Fame member, Severn is considered one of the leading pioneers of mixed martial arts and the first true world-class wrestler to compete in the Ultimate Fighting Championship (UFC). He is best known for his success in the early years of the UFC where he became the first UFC Triple Crown champion in history by winning the UFC 5 tournament, Ultimate Ultimate 1995, and UFC Superfight Championship. Severn has also competed in the International Vale Tudo Championship (IVC), Pride Fighting Championships, Fighting Network Rings, World Extreme Cagefighting (WEC), King of the Cage, Maximum Fighting Championship (MFC) and Cage Rage, and holds a professional MMA record of 101–19–7.

In professional wrestling, Severn is a two-time world champion by winning the NWA World's Heavyweight Championship twice, with his first reign lasting for over four years, and an NWA Hall of Fame member. During his almost year-long tenure with the World Wrestling Federation (WWF, now WWE), he was managed by Jim Cornette. He is the first man to compete in UFC and WWF at the same time and held the NWA and UFC championships at the same time. Severn is a world record holder for holding 13 championships. He is also the only person to be honored by the George Tragos/Lou Thesz Professional Wrestling Hall of Fame three times.

In amateur wrestling, Severn was a two time All-American at Arizona State University and a U.S. Olympic Team alternate.

== Early life ==
Severn was born and raised in central Michigan, living in both Montrose and Coldwater, and grew up farming. He learned a lot on the farm and "got his hands dirty". He and his brothers had a boyhood love for professional wrestling, and began wrestling when their parents tried to channel their interests into a more competitive outlet.

Severn was a basketball player during junior high school. He was influenced in sports from a young age. During his teen years, he took part in combat sports as he competed in amateur wrestling. He says that the coach approached him to fill in for a weight class in amateur wrestling after a sickness had gone around his school and led to a shortage of competitors. Severn signed to compete for the high school amateur wrestling team and received training.

== Amateur wrestling career ==
Severn has a long history in Greco-Roman and freestyle wrestling. His amateur wrestling career started in high school and according to many was an "absolute machine" at 191.5 pounds. He won both sports' national championships in 1976 and was named the "Outstanding High School wrestler in the nation". Before his 18th birthday, he placed in the Olympic trials. Severn was inducted into Arizona State University's wrestling hall of fame at the end of his collegiate career.

Severn was a two time All-American at Arizona State University, the original Sunkist Kid of the Sunkist Kids, and a wrestling coach at both his alma mater Arizona State and Michigan State. In addition to his home country, he has wrestled in Canada, Mexico, Brazil, Japan, England, and several other countries. Severn won a gold medal at the 1985 National Sports Festival, and a berth on the U.S. World team.

Severn failed to win in Olympic trials in 1984 and 1988, and was a finalist in the trials. During the 1984 Olympic trials, he lost the final qualifying match in controversial fashion to eventual gold medal winner Lou Banach, a match that Severn credits with launching his career. "I would have retired in 1984 from competition had everything gone the way it should have gone...I should have been on the Olympic freestyle wrestling team and I should have won the gold medal. Instead, I went to Los Angeles as the alternate, and saw the guy I thought I beat win the gold medal. It was really tough for me to swallow that. That's what kept me going on." In his long career, he has held many national and international titles. He was often introduced to the UFC Octagon as holding more than 100 in total. Severn also held the US national record for victories by pin from 1976 to 1992.

After completing his degree program and graduation Severn entered numerous competitions from 1982 to 1994 that took him to Japan, Hungary, Cuba, France, and Turkey. On each trip, Severn captured another title. He also secured 13 National AAU wrestling championships during those years. The Beast also tried his hand at coaching wrestling at ASU and Michigan State University as he continued to compete and excel after his collegiate career.

Severn has been profiled in the press around the world in such publications as USA Today, People, Karate and Kung Fu Illustrated, Black Belt Magazine, MAD, Full Contact Fighter, and many of the pro wrestling publications. Severn also runs a wrestling product company and holds annual wrestling clinics for kids of all ages. He has appeared on 48 Hours, 20/20, The Gordon Elliott Show, Nash Bridges, and many commercials.

Severn has developed a 10,000-square-foot (930 m^{2}) training facility on his property called "Michigan Sports Camps" in Coldwater, Michigan. This facility is able to house and train individuals for mixed martial arts, boxing, kickboxing, amateur wrestling and professional wrestling.

== Mixed martial arts career ==
=== Background ===
Severn started cross-training in Judo in college, in an effort to improve his wrestling skills. Severn would later use his wrestling and Judo skills to compete in the Russian martial art of Sambo, becoming AAU Sambo champion, while he also gained experience in Jujutsu prior to the UFC.

=== Ultimate Fighting Championship (1994–2000) ===
In 1994, Severn started competing in the Ultimate Fighting Championships (UFC). In his first fight at UFC 4, he surprised many UFC fans by executing two impressive back suplexes on Anthony Macias. In the finals, Severn was defeated by Royce Gracie who secured a triangle choke for the victory. The submission loss came after Severn avoided Gracie's submission efforts for 15 minutes, the longest UFC fight up until that time. He was the first world-class wrestler to enter the UFC, foreshadowing the period of dominance by wrestlers such as Don Frye in UFC 8 and 9 and Mark Coleman in UFC 10 and 11.

Severn soon returned to mixed martial arts competition, defeating several opponents to capture the tournament championship at UFC 5: Return of the Beast. Severn's second fight was with Russian Oleg Taktarov at UFC 5. He won by TKO after the referee stopped the fight due to a cut.

After winning UFC 5, Severn was matched up with Ken Shamrock at UFC 6 to determine the first UFC Superfight Champion, but was defeated by Shamrock early in the fight via submission.

Severn then entered the UFC's Ultimate Ultimate 1995, which at the time was the toughest and most competitive tournament in UFC history, consisting of past UFC tournament champions and runners-up. Severn defeated Paul Varelans, David "Tank" Abbott, and UFC 6 Tournament Champion Oleg Taktarov all in the same night to capture the tournament title.

With this win, Severn earned a rematch and title shot against then current UFC Champion Ken Shamrock for the UFC Superfight Championship. Severn won a split decision in what most fans regard as one of the worst fights in MMA history, mainly due to legal issues surrounding the event. With the win, Severn captured his third title for the promotion.

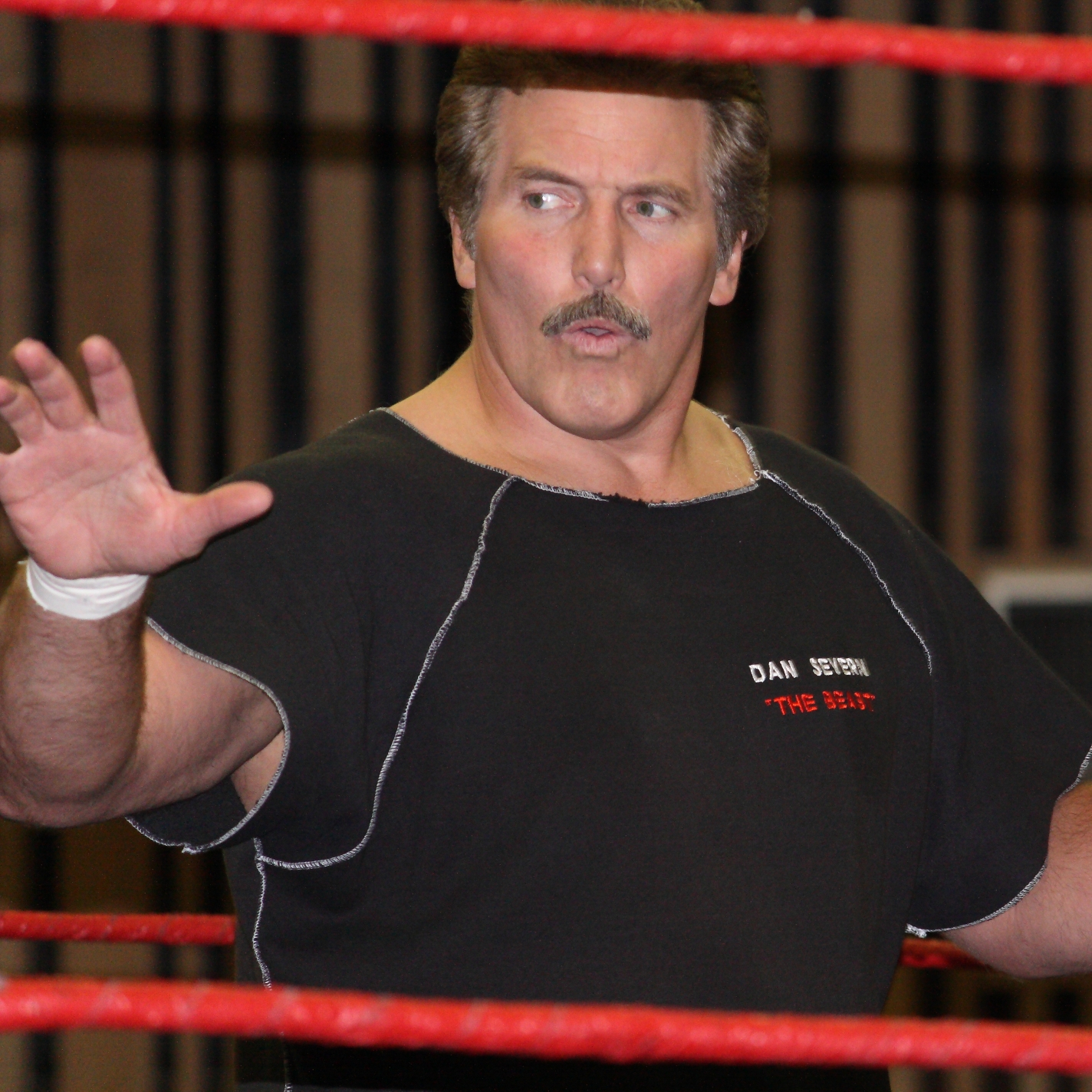
Severn in the ring in 2010

When Severn made his entrance in his fights, he would carry the National Wrestling Alliance (NWA) World's Heavyweight Championship belt out of his respect and passion for professional wrestling. Conversely, he made his entrance in the World Wrestling Federation (WWF) with his UFC Championship belt.

In 1996, Severn managed his friend and fellow wrestler and judoka Don Frye, as well as wrestling champion Dan Bobish, in their own mixed martial arts ventures. Frye would win the UFC 8 and Ultimate Ultimate 96 tournaments. The team was also expanded with female judoka Becky Levi.

In 1999, Severn founded 'The Danger Zone', a new mixed martial arts promotion intended to provide a platform for amateur fighters, in which Severn also fought. Severn has also trained and became a mentor to notable mixed martial artists including former UFC Light Heavyweight Champion Rashad Evans, The Ultimate Fighter competitor Luke Zachrich, Sean Sherk, and former UFC Light Heavyweight Champion Quinton "Rampage" Jackson.

In 2000, Severn returned to the UFC for UFC 27, quickly losing to Pedro Rizzo after a kick to the knee.

Severn was inducted into the UFC Hall of Fame at UFC 52.

=== Later career (2000–2013) ===
Severn continued his MMA career on January 29, 2011, by racking up his 97th, and 8th straight, win over Scott Fraser. In doing so he won the Elite 1 Heavyweight championship. The end came at 4:59 of Round 2 as Fraser tapped to Severn's arm triangle which he has used to secure his last three victories. The event took place at the Casino New Brunswick in Moncton, New Brunswick, Canada.

Severn defeated Cal Worsham again, this time via unanimous decision in the main event of Legends Collide 2 on February 20, 2011. Held under the long running Gladiator Challenge promotion in San Jacinto, California, Severn picked up his 9th straight win to improve his record to 98–16–7.

Severn earned his 100th career victory on April 16, 2011, with a submission victory over Aaron Garcia at KOTC: Texas.

Severn is one of only two fighters with over 100 wins in mixed martial arts. He has beaten the other fighter, Travis Fulton, and drew against him in the rematch.

=== Retirement and attempted return to competition (2013–2016) ===
On January 1, 2013, Severn announced his retirement from MMA competition.

Severn was scheduled to face fellow mixed martial arts veteran Ken Shamrock on March 20, 2016, in a MMA match for the upstart URFight promotion. However, Shamrock claimed to have been injured during his bout with Royce Gracie at Bellator 149, and was later suspended after his pre-fight blood sample tested positive for banned substances. Tank Abbott was brought in as a late replacement but failed a pre-fight physical and the bout was scrapped altogether. Severn later appeared at the event and articulated his plans to continue his fighting career and his hopes to fight at a future URFight event. Severn later released a statement condemning Shamrock's actions and casting doubt upon his injury claims.

=== Accusations of fixed and misrepresented fights ===
Severn's fight with Mitsuhiro Matsunaga at U-Japan's only event on November 17, 1996, has been called a professional wrestling work by fans and fighters. The promotion hired several professional wrestlers for this event such as Severn and Matsunaga, as well as Bam Bam Bigelow. Big Van Vader was also scheduled to fight UFC fighter Kimo Leopoldo, but dropped out of the fight. Most of the MMA fighters on the card fought other MMA fighters, but Severn fought a professional wrestler. During the fight, Severn did not fight with any traditional MMA or amateur wrestling techniques of the time, instead choosing to perform moves like professional wrestling style body slams while Matsunaga offered very little resistance. Severn finished the fight with a reverse armbar, which is practically unheard of in MMA. In amateur wrestling it is used as a hold to pin an opponent. Reverse armbars are also a popular move in professional wrestling.

On October 11, 1997, Severn fought Kimo Leopoldo at Pride FC's inaugural event in Tokyo, Japan. Pride FC, especially in its early years, were accused of having fixing fights. During the fight, both fighters threw almost nothing but light strikes for 29 of the 30 minutes. Severn tied Leopoldo in strikes despite Severn having almost no striking skills, and Leopoldo having a kickboxing background. Leopoldo was also well known to be very weak in the wrestling aspect of MMA. Severn did not begin to make any serious grappling attempts until the last minute of the fight. The Japanese fans were so angered by the fight that Severn was never invited back to Pride. This was especially angering to them because Japanese fans enjoyed the wrestling and submissions aspect of MMA more than Western fans.

On June 25, 1999, Severn fought Brad Kohler at an event in Cleveland, Ohio that was put on by Ultimate Wrestling MMA. Monte Cox, the promoter of the fight, did an interview with the Lytes Out podcast where he claims the fight was originally supposed to be a real fight. However, Severn came to Cox and explained that he was not going to be able to do a real fight, and needed to do a fixed fight. Both Severn and Kohler assured Cox that they could make it look real. It was obvious to MMA fighter Jeremy Horn who was the referee that it was a fixed fight though. The fight had almost no strikes and consisted mostly of professional wrestling style slams. After about seven minutes of fighting, Kohler ran towards Severn as he was leaning against the ropes and when he hit Severn they both went over the ropes and into the crowd. Severn returned to the ring and won by count out. There is not a single other instance of an MMA fight ending in a count out because this is something done only in professional wrestling.

Longtime regional MMA legend Travis Fulton claimed in some 2004 forum posts while interacting with fans on MixedMartialArts.com that several of Severn's fights were fixed, including their fights together, saying:

Severn has a financial interest in keeping the works secret. Severn is a good guy though. His works are as follows: vs Kohler vs Japanese guy in U Japan vs Butterbean vs me in DZ(Severn's MMA organization) and then 2 more that I am not at liberty to speak about. But I know for a fact that they were works. I can't tell though because I'd lose friends in the process. Other than that everything else Severn has done is legit. Wins over Oleg, Shamrock, Tank, Braga, Griffin, Conan, Neto, Buentello, Vale, Sims, and Eilers are very impressive. Not many people have defeated so many big names.

On June 30, 2001, Severn faced off against Travis Fulton in World Extreme Cage Fighting's(WEC) inaugural event in Lemoore, CA for their third fight together. Fulton disclosed after the fight that Severns manager Becky Levi approached Fulton on behalf of Severn, and Levi told Fulton that they don't want this fight unless they get paid more money. She also asked Fulton to go easy and guarantee Severn the victory or they would not fight. Fulton accepted. It was very noticeable to referee Mason White that Fulton was holding back from punching Severn. Fulton was well known to be a well rounded fighter with a powerful right hook. According to Fulton, he agreed to not throw any punches because one of his hands was hurt. This led to the IFC suspending Severn, Fulton and Levi from fighting in their organization. The WEC also never allowed them to ever fight in the promotion again.

Severn's fight with Shannon Ritch on July 2, 2005, in Honolulu, Hawaii is widely considered to be a fixed fight. Ritch was also suspended by the California State Athletic Commission in September 2006 for an alleged fixed fight. Longtime UFC veteran Chael Sonnen said that they were doing gymnastics and professional wrestling moves during the fight, and also said that the "interviews after the fact were worse than the job you did in the ring faking it". MMA fighter Brian Geraghty, who was present at the fight, said in an interview that the promotor for the fight was furiously cursing at the obvious fake fight, and the fighters who were present ringside were laughing at the absurdity.

== Professional wrestling career ==
=== Early career (1992–1995) ===
As accomplished as Severn is in amateur wrestling, he is also an accomplished professional wrestler, having competed in shoot style wrestling for UWF International in Japan, as well as the National Wrestling Alliance (NWA), and the World Wrestling Federation (WWF) in the US. Severn claims Lou Thesz as an influence to professional wrestling. Thesz would later become a fan of Severn after watching him compete in UWFi and UFC, praising Severn's wrestling skills.

Severn originally started competing in professional wrestling in 1992 for UWF-I (Universal Wrestling Federation International) under the Union Of Professional Wrestling Force. This is the international version and not to be confused with UWF-J which is the Japanese version. In his debut match on November 25, 1992, he defeated Yuko Miyato. (also known as Shigeo Miyato) He then defeated the likes of Yoji Anjo, and Kiyoshi Tamura, which lead to 1993. On February 14, 1993, Dan Severn was defeated by Nobuhiko Takada. This was Severn's first official loss in professional wrestling.

On January 28, 1994, Severn began to wrestle for All American Pro Wrestling (AAPW) and faced Shinobi in a winning effort. One day later he beat his former trainer, Al Snow on an AAPW show. Severn began to branch out to other promotions such as Border City Wrestling (BCW) and Continental Championship Wrestling (CCW). On August 13, 1993, in UWF-I, Severn and Gary Albright defeated Kiyoshi Tamura and Nobuhiko Takada. This was Severn's first tag team match, thus beginning his tag team career. 1993 was the first year that Severn made the Pro Wrestling Illustrated 500, at No. 389.

During his time with the Union Of Professional Wrestling Force International, Severn participated in the Best Of The World 1994 tournament, Dan finished before the semi-finals.

On February 18, 1995, Severn was the number one contender against Bruiser Bedlam for Midwest Territorial Wrestling Heavyweight Championship at a Midwest Territorial Wrestling (MTW) event. However, the match ended in a no contest thus saw Bedlam retain the title.

=== National Wrestling Alliance (1995–2010) ===
==== NWA World Heavyweight Champion (1995–1999) ====
Severn entered the National Wrestling Alliance (NWA) in 1995, making his debut for the governing body at an event on January 6, by defeating Johnny Johnson in a "wrestler versus boxer" match. On February 24, Severn defeated Chris Candido to capture his first NWA World's Heavyweight Championship at a Smoky Mountain Wrestling (SMW) event. Severn made his first title defense on March 17 against Benson Lee at a Steel City Wrestling event, where he retained the title. He went on to win the UFC 5 tournament Championship in April, making him the first and only man to hold an MMA and a professional wrestling championship simultaneously.

Severn defended the title on various NWA promotions, with most of his title defenses taking place in NWA New Jersey. His challengers during his first year of title reign included Osamu Nishimura, Tommy Cairo, Max Anthony, Yoshihiro Tajiri, Andre Baker, Tony Monroe, Geza Kalman Jr., and Jim Neidhart. He also returned to SMW, retaining the title against Bobby Blaze twice, at Charlotte Memories and Superbowl of Wrestling. He toured Japan, competing for International Wrestling Association (IWA) at Kawasaki Dream where he defeated Tarzan Goto to retain the title in front of a massive 28,000 fans at the Kawasaki Stadium. Severn was ranked No. 4 for the "most inspirational wrestler" award and No. 35 on the PWI 500 by Pro Wrestling Illustrated in 1995.

Severn continued to retain the title in 1996, against the likes of Jim Neidhart, Ghetto Blaster, Repo Man, and Geza Kalman Jr. He also defeated his trainer Al Snow at the First Annual Eddie Gilbert Memorial Brawl. He retained the title throughout 1997 against Harley Lewis, Jimmy Cicero, Johnny Paradise, Devon Storm and Typhoon. Severn also defended the title against the legendary Dory Funk Jr. at the Second Annual Eddie Gilbert Memorial Brawl. The match ended in a double count-out, resulting in Severn retaining the title. In the autumn of 1997, Severn returned to IWA Japan, where he retained the World Heavyweight Championship twice, against The Great Kabuki and Leatherface.

Severn held onto the title throughout 1998, retaining against Franz Schuhmann at the Third Annual Eddie Gilbert Memorial Brawl. The other challengers for the title whom he defeated that year included Rod Price, Paul Atlas, Rik Ratchet, Lance Diamond, Doug Gilbert, Sgt. Craig Pittman, Doink the Clown and Mike Roselli. Severn's final two title defenses were at major supercards, the first against Steven Regal at 50th Anniversary Show and Hack Meyers at NWA Florida event WrestleGrowl '98. Severn defeated both challengers to retain the title.

After holding the title for four years, Severn lost the World Heavyweight Championship to Naoya Ogawa at a Universal Fighting-Arts Organization event Battle in the Hama Ring on March 14, 1999. Severn's reign was the longest reign in over two decades and the third-longest reign in the history of the NWA World Heavyweight Championship. Severn would challenge Ogawa for the title in a rematch at NWA Southwest on May 28. The match ended in a double count-out. It was restarted but ended in a five-minute time-limit draw.

==== Return to the NWA (2001–2002, 2006) ====
Severn returned to NWA by appearing at a NWA Florida event February Fury on February 20, 2001. The following year, Severn defeated Shinya Hashimoto to win his second NWA World Heavyweight Championship at a Pro Wrestling Zero-One event Vast Energy on March 3, 2002. He defended the title only once against Big Kahuna at a Canadian Wrestling Federation (CWF) event on April 14. The match ended in a no contest. This title reign was controversial and short-lived, as the title was stripped from Severn when he was unable to appear on the inaugural Total Nonstop Action Wrestling pay-per-view to defend his title; the belt was won that evening by Ken Shamrock. On July 5, Severn challenged Hotstuff Hernandez for the NWA National Heavyweight Championship. The match ended in a double disqualification.

Severn returned to NWA at its United Kingdom-based territory NWA UK Hammerlock, where he defeated Johnny Moss on February 16, 2006. Severn lost the title back to Moss two days later on February 18.

==== NWA Hall of Fame (2010) ====
In 2010, Severn was inducted into the NWA Hall of Fame.

=== World Wrestling Federation (1997–1999) ===
Severn made his first appearance, with the NWA World's Heavyweight Championship belt, in the World Wrestling Federation (WWF, now WWE) on the June 23, 1997 episode of Monday Night Raw, which aired from Cobo Hall in Detroit, joining the color commentary team for Ken Shamrock's match against Rockabilly, although he had not yet signed a contract with the WWF at that point. Shamrock won in a squash match with a belly-to-belly suplex followed by an ankle lock before confronting Severn at ringside. After a tense staredown, Severn and Shamrock eventually shook hands, showing mutual respect for one another.

As NWA champion, Severn debuted in the World Wrestling Federation in March 1998 during a story line where the NWA invaded the WWF. Severn also wrestled on NWA territories simultaneous to his tenure with the WWF. Severn was first seen attacking The Headbangers when they were feuding with Bob Holly and Bart Gunn, who were a part of the NWA invasion. In his debut match on March 31, he defeated Flash Funk in quick fashion. He was briefly managed by Jim Cornette who commentated during his matches and helped "get him over". During his entrance, Severn and Cornette carried Severn's titles consisting of mixed martial arts championship belts and the NWA world's heavyweight title. Cornette stated that "He has so many titles he keeps some at home because he can't take them in the airport", which is why Severn brought only his most prestigious championships. His character was portrayed as a heel (villain). Like Flash Funk, he defeated multiple opponents afterwards, the likes of Savio Vega and Mosh, in quick fashion and by showing some of his MMA style and ability. This led to a winning streak. The NWA invasion was brief and saw the debut of The Midnight Express and a repackaged Jeff Jarrett. Barry Windham was also a member. Severn would tag team with these members from the stable. Severn would then leave the stable soon after to continue further singles competition on his own.

He feuded with old MMA rival Ken Shamrock, where the WWF played up their history in UFC. During his one-year tenure, he competed in the Brawl for All tournament, (a legitimate shoot boxing competition) beating The Godfather in the first round. However, he withdrew prior to the quarterfinals, allowing The Godfather to advance by default. He would also take part in the 1998 King of the Ring tournament, defeating D'Lo Brown and Owen Hart before losing to The Rock in the semi-finals.

Dan made his WWF Shotgun Saturday Night debut in the opening match against G.I. Will in a squash match. On the June 8, 1998, episode of Monday Night Raw, Severn would (kayfabe) injure Brown's rib cage via the bow and arrow submission hold, causing him to wear a chest protector for the next few months. On July 28, 1998, Severn competed against D'Lo Brown for the WWF European Championship. He would win the match by disqualification, meaning Brown retained the championship.

Later that year he was involved in a storyline with Owen Hart, where Hart caused an (kayfabe) injury to the neck of Severn, via a piledriver. He was part of the 1999 Royal Rumble, being the 8th entrant and lasting almost 6 minutes before being eliminated by Mabel. He left the WWF due to creative differences. His last match was on the following Raw, where Steve Blackman defeated Severn via disqualification. In house shows leading up to this, Blackman would defeat Severn every time.

According to Severn, shortly before the 1999 Royal Rumble, the WWF asked to him to tattoo "666" on his forehead ("the mark of the beast") and become a disciple of the Undertaker, presumably as part of his Ministry of Darkness stable forming during that time. Severn refused to do this, telling the company that he was uncomfortable with the nature of the storyline. When the company responded by telling Severn that they would bury his character if he declined to do as they asked, Severn countered by threatening to use his legitimate wrestling and fighting skills to shoot on his coworkers and make them "look silly" in the process. This caused the WWF to back off on the idea, but Severn still asked for and received a release not too long after.

Severn in a recorded interview stated that the talent of the locker room was scared of him. He said he noticed this when they referred to him as "Mr. Severn" and thought it was a "rib" (joke) as well as wrestlers avoiding him. He asked one of the talent and they responded saying, "You scare us. We're afraid that you're going to wig out in one of our matches."

=== Independent promotions (1999–present) ===
Severn appeared in 2000 in the short-lived WXO promotion. On May 27, 2000, he defeated Greg Valentine in Ashwaubenon, Wisconsin.

In 2006 Severn wrestled on AWE, the television series which had 1 season and 7 episodes on the fight network. After this, the AWE folded due to financial issues.

In 2015, on Great North Wrestling (GNW) Dan faced Hannibal for the Great North Wrestling Canadian Championship in a losing effort in Hawkesbury, Ontario.

In May 2016, Dan signed with AIW for a promotional deal. He was put into a championship tournament named the "JT Lightning Invitational Tournament 2016" Severn advanced by defeating Colin Delaney. Severn was knocked out of the tournament in the semi-finals in a fatal four-way match when Raymond Rowe was the victor against Dan, Tim Donst and Tracey Williams.

On February 4, 2017, Severn was inducted into the War Wrestling Hall of Fame in Lima, OH.

On May 12, 2017, Dan Severn competed at Gladiator Championship Wrestling against Brent Myers in a winning effort via his Beast Choker finishing submission move. Then on June 3, Dan returned to Price of Glory Wrestling where he defeated "so fine" Frank Isaac Anderson, who Severn trained to become a professional wrestler.

On March 17, 2019, Josh Barnett announced via Twitter that Severn would be participating in Game Changer Wrestling's (GCW) Bloodsport, an event that features worked matches presented in a shoot style. Severn competed against former UFC Heavyweight Champion Frank Mir in Mir's professional wrestling debut at the event on April 4. Severn lost the match.

On April 5, 2019, Severn appeared for Major League Wrestling at their second Battle Riot event. He competed in the titular match, entering at number two and was eventually eliminated by Minoru Tanaka.

Recently, Severn wrestled on July 12, 2025, for two matches for Pro Wrestling King in Elkhart, Indiana. He lost to One Man Kru in a steel cage match. Later that night he defeated Mitchell Taylor in steel cage match.

=== Midwest Wrestling Alliance / Price of Glory Wrestling (2004–2018) ===
Severn founded Midwest Wrestling Alliance (MWA) with Mark Pennington, based out of Coldwater, Michigan in June 2004. Utilizing the many students at his pro wrestling school Michigan sports camps, they created the popular promotion running on a monthly basis. In 2005, the promotion was renamed Price of Glory (PoG). Severn competed many times in PoG against the likes of Jimmy Jacobs, N8 Mattson, CJ Otis, Jack Thriller and more. He was a referee for Price of Glory 17: Merry Massacre in 2005.

On June 21, 2009, Severn and Johnny Dynamo had a career vs career match for the POGW Heavyweight Championship at Faded Glory IV, where the loser would be forced to retire. After a technical match-up, Severn came out as the victor and won the Price of Glory Heavyweight championship. The show ended with the two wrestlers showing respect to each other and the roster came out to pay tribute to Dynamo's career. Severn vacated the title at Intrusion on September 13. After running for fourteen years, the promotion closed in 2018.

== Acting career ==
Severn has starred in various movies and television series, starting in 1993 with Rudy, in which he played a football player. The movie is a sports/drama film directed by David Anspaugh.

Severn then appeared in two episodes of Nash Bridges in 1998 and 1999.

In 2005, he played a police captain in Swamp Zombies, an action/horror film directed by Len Kabasinski.

In 2010, Severn acted as an applicant for the movie Minor League: A Football Story directed by Clenet Verdi-Rose. The movie is a sport/comedy/drama about a struggling minor league football team that is not doing well and as their newly signed coach, Severn gives the team a second chance to change things around.

Also in 2010, Severn acted as "The Beast" in the action movie called Kill Factor directed and written by Leo Fong. The plot is about a detective on the track of a serial killer in L.A.

In late 2010, Severn played himself in Tetherball: The Movie directed by Chris Nickin. It is a sports/comedy movie and the plot of the movie is that three friends decide to start a tetherball league and wind up becoming amateur athletes and have "more booze, babes, and balls than they can handle."

In 2012, Severn acted in the amateur wrestling movie Win by Fall directed by Chris Nickin, as the character called Coach Winters. The movie is about a wrestler named Scott Reynolds, who is the state's best 152-pound wrestler. The team's 171-pound wrestler breaks his leg and coach Winters (played by Severn) moves Scott up to the 171-pound division. If Scott wants to go to college and earn a scholarship, he must win in his new weight class.

In 2014, Severn acted in College Fright Night which is a comedy/horror movie directed by Brad Leo Lyon. Severn plays as a police officer.

In 2016, Severn acted as a referee in Beyond the Game which is an action movie directed by Erken Ialgashev and written by J. Stephen Maunder and David Mitchell. The plot summary is contestants in a reality show have to fight to survive.

Also in 2016, Severn starred as the character Rich Chandler in The Fight Within, which is a sport/action/romance movie directed by Michael William Gordon. The movie is based on Logan Chandler, an MMA fighter.

In 2025, Severn played Peter in the zombie horror film Return of the Corn Zombies.

== In other media ==
Severn is featured on the front covers of many martial arts magazines such as the Tae Kwon Do Times and Karate Kung-fu. In 2022, he begun hosting the Dan and Don's Toxic Masculinity Podcast with his longtime friend Don Frye.

== Personal life ==
Severn was born in Coldwater, Michigan, and went to high school at Hill McCloy HS located in Montrose, Michigan. He has four brothers, all of whom were All-American wrestlers in high school and college. Severn has five children. His son, David Severn, is a professional and amateur wrestler. He has won two state championships in his home state of Michigan.

Severn has an autobiography published named The Realest Guy in the Room: The Life and Times of Dan Severn. It was co-authored by Ian Douglass and was originally published on July 7, 2016. It includes a foreword from Jim Cornette, who managed Severn during his WWF run.

Severn owns his own mixed martial arts camp in Coldwater, Michigan.

== Championships and accomplishments ==
=== Amateur wrestling ===
- Arizona State University wrestling Hall of Famer
- 1980 Summer Olympic team alternate
- 13 National AAU wrestling championships from 1982 to 1994
- 1984 Summer Olympic team alternate
- 1985 Canada Cup Gold Medalist
- 1988 Summer Olympic team alternate

=== Mixed martial arts ===
- Martial Arts History Museum Hall of Fame
  - Class of 2011
- In Judo
  - 5th degree black belt
- In Jiu-jitsu
  - 2nd degree black belt
- World Extreme Cagefighting
  - Headlined and Won the main event of WEC 1
- Ultimate Fighting Championship
  - UFC 5 Tournament Championship
  - Ultimate Ultimate 1995 Tournament Championship
  - UFC Superfight Championship (One time, last)
  - UFC 4 Tournament Runner-up
  - UFC Hall of Fame (Pioneer Wing, Class of 2005)
  - UFC Viewer's Choice Award
  - UFC Encyclopedia Awards
    - Fight of the Night (Three times) vs. Royce Gracie, Paul Varelans and Mark Coleman
  - First fighter to ever be awarded a UFC title belt
  - Triple Crown Champion (The first in UFC history)
- The Danger Zone
  - Undefeated in Danger Zone single bout competition
- Elite-1 MMA
  - Elite-1 MMA Heavyweight Championship (one time)
- Continental Freefighting Alliance
  - CFA Super Heavyweight Championship (one time)
- Gladiator Challenge
  - Gladiator Challenge Superfight Heavyweight Championship (one time)
- Sherdog
  - Mixed Martial Arts Hall of Fame

=== Professional wrestling ===
- Atlantic Terror Championship Wrestling
  - ATCW Heavyweight Championship (1 time)
- Canada National Wrestling Alliance
  - MPW Tag Team Championship (1 time) - with Massive Damage
- Cauliflower Alley Club
  - Lou Thesz Award (2010)
- Dynamic Wrestling Alliance
  - DWA Heavyweight Championship (1 time)
- George Tragos/Lou Thesz Professional Wrestling Hall of Fame
  - Frank Gotch Award (2002)
  - George Tragos Award (2012)
  - Class of 2018
- Great American Mat Endeavors
  - GAME Heavyweight Championship (1 time)
  - GAME Strong Style Heavyweight Championship (1 time)
- Global Wrestling Alliance
  - GWA Heavyweight Championship (3 times)
- Legends Pro Wrestling
  - LPW Hall of Fame (Class of 2012)
- Monster Pro Wrestling
  - MPW Tag Team Championships (1 time) - with Massive Damage
- National Championship Wrestling
  - NCW Heavyweight Championship (1 time)
- National Wrestling Alliance
  - NWA World Heavyweight Championship (2 times)
  - NWA United Kingdom Heavyweight Championship (1 time)
  - NWA Hall of Fame (2010)
- Northern States Wrestling Alliance
  - NSWA Heavyweight Championship (1 time)
- Price of Glory Wrestling
  - POGW Heavyweight Championship (1 time)
- Pro Wrestling All-Stars Of Detroit
  - Denny Kass Memorial Battle Royal (2016)
- Pro Wrestling Illustrated
  - Ranked No. 35 of the top 500 singles wrestlers in the "PWI 500" in 1995
  - Ranked No. 252 of the top 500 singles wrestlers of the "PWI Years" in 2003
- WAR Wrestling
  - WAR Hall of Fame (2017)

== Mixed martial arts record ==
Professional record breakdown
127 matches	101 wins	19 losses
By knockout	23	4
By submission	54	8
By decision	24	7
Draws	7	

Res.	Record	Opponent	Method	Event	Date	Round	Time	Location	Notes
Win	101–19–7	Alex Rozman	Decision (unanimous)	Blue Blood MMA	April 28, 2012	3	5:00	Davenport, Iowa, United States	
Loss	100–19–7	Lee Beane	KO (punches)	Paul Vandale Promotions: The Beast Comes East	May 20, 2011	1	3:28	Worcester, Massachusetts, United States	
Loss	100–18–7	Ryan Fortin	KO (punches)	King Of The Cage: Mile Zero	April 29, 2011	3	4:04	Dawson Creek, British Columbia, Canada	
Win	100–17–7	Aaron Garcia	Submission (neck crank)	KOTC: Texas	April 16, 2011	1	2:18	Lubbock, Texas, United States	
Win	99–17–7	Cal Worsham	Decision (unanimous)	Gladiator Challenge: Legends Collide 2	February 20, 2011	3	5:00	San Jacinto, California, United States	
Win	98–17–7	Scott Fraser	Submission (arm-triangle choke)	Elite-1 MMA: Tapping Out	January 29, 2011	1	4:59	Moncton, New Brunswick, Canada	Won the Elite-1 MMA Heavyweight Title.
Win	97–17–7	William Hatch	Submission (arm-triangle choke)	King of the Cage: Black Ops	December 4, 2010	1	4:23	Cold Lake, Alberta, Canada	
Win	96–17–7	Tom Benesocky	Submission (arm-triangle choke)	King of the Cage 48	November 21, 2010	1	1:33	Edmonton, Alberta, Canada	
Win	95–17–7	Chad Olmstead	TKO (punches)	King of the Cage: Lock Down	July 30, 2010	2	1:27	Edmonton, Alberta, Canada	
Win	94–17–7	Sam Flood	Submission (guillotine choke)	King of the Cage: Fearless	April 24, 2010	1	4:24	Penticton, British Columbia, Canada	
Win	93–17–7	Buddie Dixion	TKO (punches)	King of the Cage: Thunderstruck ll	March 18, 2010	2	2:22	Calgary, Alberta, Canada	
Win	92–17–7	Eddie Trotter	TKO (doctor stoppage)	GFC: Gladiator Fighting Championship	October 24, 2009	1	5:00	Jenkins, Kentucky, United States	
Win	91–17–7	Woody Young	Submission (arm-triangle choke)	KOTC: Disputed	July 25, 2009	2	2:31	Sault Ste. Marie, Michigan, United States	
Win	90–17–7	Steve Eakins	Decision (unanimous)	Gladiator Challenge: The Beast	May 16, 2009	3	5:00	Elko, Nevada, United States	
Loss	89–17–7	William Richey	Decision (split)	Iroquois: MMA Championships 7	January 24, 2009	3	5:00	Hagersville, Ontario, Canada	
Loss	89–16–7	Pavel Botka	Decision	Heaven or Hell: Hell Cage	May 3, 2008	N/A	N/A	Prague, Czech Republic	
Win	89–15–7	Damon Clark	Submission (kimura)	WFC: Armageddon	April 12, 2008	1	2:30	Denver, Colorado, United States	
Win	88–15–7	Colin Robinson	Decision (unanimous)	Cage Wars: Max Extreme fighting	March 9, 2008	3	N/A	Belfast, Northern Ireland	
Win	87–15–7	Ian Asham	Submission (kimura)	Iroquois: MMA Championships II	February 9, 2008	N/A	N/A	Ohsweken, Ontario, Canada	
Win	86–15–7	Don Richards	Decision (unanimous)	KOTC: Bad Boys	November 21, 2007	3	5:00	Mount Pleasant, Michigan, United States	
Win	85–15–7	Jimmy Westfall	Decision (unanimous)	Universal Fight Promotions	October 13, 2007	3	5:00	New Mexico, United States	
Win	84–15–7	Mark Smith	TKO (corner stoppage)	Titans of the Pentagon	September 22, 2007	1	N/A	San José, Costa Rica	
Win	83–15–7	Victor Vincelette	Submission (choke)	WFC: Rumble in the Red Rocks	June 9, 2007	1	1:35	Camp Verde, Arizona, United States	
Win	82–15–7	Terrell Pree	Submission (armbar)	WVF: Minot	April 21, 2007	1	4:18	Minot, North Dakota, United States	
Win	81–15–7	Jason Keith	Submission (rear-naked choke)	GC 60: Invasion	March 23, 2007	1	2:36	Farmington, New Mexico, United States	
Win	80–15–7	Kasey Geyer	Submission (rear-naked choke)	CCCF: Riverwind Rumble	February 24, 2007	2	1:25	Norman, Oklahoma, United States	
Win	79–15–7	Clifford Coon	Submission (rear-naked choke)	CCCF: Red River Riot	February 17, 2007	1	1:53	Thackerville, Oklahoma, United States	
Loss	78–15–7	Dave Legeno	Decision (unanimous)	Cage Rage 20	February 10, 2007	3	5:00	London, England	
Win	78–14–7	Wade Hamilton	Submission (keylock)	KOTC: Mass Destruction	January 26, 2007	1	3:08	Mount Pleasant, Michigan, United States	
Win	77–14–7	Chris Clark	Submission (heel hook)	IFC: Rumble on the River 2	November 10, 2006	1	3:08	Kearney, Nebraska, United States	
Win	76–14–7	Brian Heden	Decision (split)	NFA: Night of the Beast	September 23, 2006	4	5:00	Fargo, North Dakota, United States	
Win	75–14–7	Skip Hall	Submission (choke)	Independent event	August 26, 2006	1	N/A	Alabama, United States	
Win	74–14–7	Lanny Griffin	Submission (scarf hold)	Indiana Martial Arts	August 12, 2006	1	0:46	Fort Wayne, Indiana, United States	
Win	73–14–7	Robert Berry	Submission (rear-naked choke)	MMA Total Combat 16	June 3, 2006	1	4:21	Spennymoor, England	
Win	72–14–7	Victor Vincelette	TKO (submission to punches)	WFC: Rumble in the Rockies	January 21, 2006	1	1:22	Loveland, Colorado, United States	
Loss	71–14–7	Joop Kasteel	KO (punch)	Rings Holland: Men of Honor	December 11, 2005	1	1:28	Utrecht, Netherlands	
Win	71–13–7	Tyson Smith	TKO (submission to punches)	Action Wrestling Entertainment	October 5, 2005	1	4:12	Winnipeg, Manitoba, Canada	
Loss	70–13–7	Victor Valimaki	Decision (unanimous)	MFC 8: Resurrection	September 9, 2005	3	5:00	Edmonton, Alberta, Canada	
Win	70–12–7	Rick Collup	TKO (submission to knees)	GC 39: Titans Collide	July 17, 2005	2	3:11	Porterville, California, United States	
Win	69–12–7	Shannon Ritch	Submission (triangle choke)	Extreme Wars: X-1	July 2, 2005	2	1:05	Honolulu, United States	
Win	68–12–7	Shannon Ritch	Submission (keylock)	Northern Fighting Championships	June 3, 2005	2	N/A	Alaska, United States	
Loss	67–12–7	Bob Stines	Submission	Warrior: MMA 4	March 12, 2005	1	0:52	Corbin, Kentucky, United States	
Win	67–11–7	Cal Worsham	TKO (doctor stoppage)	GC 34: Legends Collide	January 27, 2005	3	3:29	Colusa, California, United States	
Win	66–11–7	Lee Mein	TKO	Continental Fighting Championships	November 20, 2004	2	1:41	Saskatoon, Saskatchewan, Canada	
Loss	65–11–7	James Thompson	Decision (unanimous)	UC 11: Wrath of the Beast	September 12, 2004	5	5:00	Bristol, England	
Win	65–10–7	Chad Rafdel	TKO (corner stoppage)	AFA: Beast	July 31, 2004	1	3:00	Iowa, United States	
Win	64–10–7	Hidetada Irie	Decision (unanimous)	Gladiator FC: Day 1	June 26, 2004	3	5:00	Seoul, South Korea	
Win	63–10–7	Ruben Villareal	Decision (split)	GC 27: FightFest 2	June 3, 2004	2	5:00	Colusa, California, United States	
Win	62–10–7	Greg Lockhart	Submission	Dangerzone: Professional Level Cage Fighting	April 10, 2004	2	1:45	Osceola, Iowa, United States	
Win	61–10–7	Johnathan Ivey	Decision (unanimous)	Hardcore Fighting Championships 3	March 27, 2004	N/A	N/A	Worcester, Massachusetts, United States	
Loss	60–10–7	Tony Bonello	Submission (rear-naked choke)	XFC 4: Australia vs The World	March 19, 2004	1	1:36	Brisbane, Australia	
Loss	60–9–7	Ulysses Castro	Submission (verbal)	Enter the Beast	March 6, 2004	3	2:45	Nanaimo, British Columbia, Canada	
Draw	60–8–7	Jerry Vrbanovic	Draw	KOTC 33: After Shock	February 20, 2004	2	5:00	San Jacinto, California, United States	
Loss	60–8–6	Seth Petruzelli	Decision (unanimous)	KOTC 32: Bringing Heat	January 24, 2004	3	5:00	Miami, Florida, United States	
Win	60–7–6	Ray Seraille	Submission (armbar)	Pacific X-Treme Combat	January 17, 2004	3	2:03	Mangilao, Guam, United States	
Win	59–7–6	Mathias Hughes	Submission	Seasons Beatings	December 18, 2003	1	2:40	Winnipeg, Canada	
Draw	58–7–6	Homer Moore	Draw	RITC 54: 'The Beast' vs 'The Rock'	October 25, 2003	3	3:00	Phoenix, Arizona, United States	
Win	58–7–5	Gary Dudley	TKO (punches)	Gladiator Challenge 18	August 21, 2003	1	2:08	Colusa, California, United States	
Win	57–7–5	Dan Christison	Decision (split)	KOTC 24: Mayhem	June 14, 2003	3	5:00	Albuquerque, New Mexico, United States	
Win	56–7–5	Shane Moore	Submission	Hardcore Fighting Championships	May 24, 2003	2	0:46	Revere, Massachusetts, United States	
Win	55–7–5	Cory Timmerman	Decision (unanimous)	KOTC 23: Sin City	May 16, 2003	3	5:00	Las Vegas, Nevada, United States	
Loss	54–7–5	Ulysses Castro	Decision	MFC 6: Road To Gold	February 22, 2003	3	5:00	Lethbridge, Alberta, Canada	
Draw	54–6–5	Pat Stano	Draw	War at the Shore	January 17, 2003	3	5:00	Atlantic City, New Jersey, United States	
Win	54–6–4	Mike Ward	Submission (bulldog choke)	UC 4: Eyes of the Beast	December 1, 2002	3	1:42	Chippenham, England	
Win	53–6–4	Justin Eilers	Decision (unanimous)	VFC 3: Total Chaos	November 23, 2002	3	5:00	Council Bluffs, Iowa, United States	
Win	52–6–4	Mark Smith	Submission (keylock)	KOTC 18: Sudden Impact	November 1, 2002	1	2:56	Reno, Nevada, United States	
Win	51–6–4	Dan Christison	Decision	Aztec Challenge 1	September 6, 2002	3	5:00	Ciudad Juárez, Mexico	
Win	50–6–4	John Jensen	TKO (corner stoppage)	KOTC 14: 5150	June 19, 2002	1	5:00	Bernalillo, New Mexico, United States	
Win	49–6–4	Steve Sayegh	TKO (submission to punches)	Dangerzone: Caged Heat	April 13, 2002	1	5:45	New Town, North Dakota, United States	
Win	48–6–4	Forrest Griffin	Decision (unanimous)	RSF 5: New Blood Conflict	October 27, 2001	3	4:00	Augusta, Georgia, United States	
Draw	47–6–4	Travis Fulton	Draw	Iowa Challenge 3	September 22, 2001	3	5:00	Waterloo, Iowa, United States	
Win	47–6–3	Lenn Walker	TKO (submission to punches)	UW: St. Paul	July 15, 2001	1	1:49	Saint Paul, Minnesota, United States	
Win	46–6–3	Travis Fulton	Decision (unanimous)	WEC 1	June 30, 2001	3	5:00	Lemoore, California, United States	
Win	45–6–3	Wes Sims	Decision (unanimous)	RSF 2: Attack at the Track	June 23, 2001	3	4:00	Chester, West Virginia, United States	
Win	44–6–3	Harry Moskowitz	Submission (keylock)	Reality Combat Fighting 11	May 10, 2001	1	2:12	Houma, Louisiana, United States	
Loss	43–6–3	Jonathan Wiezorek	Submission (choke)	RSF 1: Redemption in the Valley	April 21, 2001	2	1:03	Wheeling, West Virginia, United States	
Win	43–5–3	Aaron Keeney	Submission (keylock)	Dangerzone: Insane In Ft. Wayne	November 25, 2000	1	2:03	Fort Wayne, Indiana, United States	
Win	42–5–3	Travis Fulton	Submission (rear-naked choke)	Dangerzone: Night of the Beast	October 28, 2000	1	2:01	Lynchburg, Virginia, United States	
Loss	41–5–3	Pedro Rizzo	TKO (submission to leg kicks)	UFC 27	September 22, 2000	1	1:33	New Orleans, Louisiana, United States	
Win	41–4–3	Andrei Kopylov	Decision (unanimous)	Rings: Millennium Combine 3	August 23, 2000	2	5:00	Osaka, Japan	
Win	40–4–3	John Dixson	Submission (keylock)	Continental Freefighting Alliance 2	July 19, 2000	1	5:18	Corinth, Mississippi, United States	
Win	39–4–3	Ron Rumpf	Submission (keylock)	Dangerzone: Battle At The Bear	July 8, 2000	1	0:54	New Town, North Dakota, United States	
Win	38–4–3	Bob Stines	Submission (neck crank)	Dangerzone: Ft. Wayne 2	May 20, 2000	1	0:44	Fort Wayne, Indiana, United States	
Win	37–4–3	Marcus Silveira	Submission (arm-triangle choke)	WEF 9: World Class	May 13, 2000	1	4:46	Evansville, Indiana, United States	
Win	36–4–3	Bart Vale	TKO (doctor stoppage)	CFA 1: Collision at the Crossroads	March 25, 2000	2	0:36	Corinth, Mississippi, United States	
Loss	35–4–3	Josh Barnett	Submission (armbar)	SuperBrawl 16	February 8, 2000	4	1:21	Honolulu, United States	
Win	35–3–3	Mark Jaquith	Decision	Dangerzone: Ft. Wayne	November 22, 1999	1	15:00	Fort Wayne, Indiana, United States	
Win	34–3–3	Phil Ortiz	Submission (keylock)	Extreme Challenge 28	October 9, 1999	1	1:55	Ogden, Utah, United States	
Win	33–3–3	David Ferguson	TKO (submission to punches)	Dangerzone: Ft. Smith	September 18, 1999	1	8:36	Fort Smith, Arkansas, United States	
Win	32–3–3	Nick Starks	Decision	Ultimate Reality Fighting	July 18, 1999	N/A	0:00	Orlando, Florida, United States	
Win	31–3–3	Brad Kohler	TKO (slam)	Ultimate Wrestling	June 25, 1999	1	7:57	Cleveland, Ohio, United States	
Win	30–3–3	Slade Martin	Submission (keylock)	Dangerzone: Mahnomen	June 19, 1999	1	3:30	Mahnomen, Minnesota, United States	
Win	29–3–3	Ross Quam	Submission (jaw lock)	Brawl in the Black Hills 1	May 15, 1999	1	N/A	Rapid City, South Dakota, United States	
Win	28–3–3	Kevin Rosier	Submission (bulldog choke)	Cage Combat 1	December 8, 1998	1	1:00	Conesville, Iowa, United States	
Win	27–3–3	Joe Frailey	Submission (armbar)	SuperBrawl 9	September 19, 1998	1	4:02	El Paso, Texas, United States	
Draw	26–3–3	Pat Miletich	Draw	Extreme Challenge 20	August 22, 1998	1	20:00	Davenport, Iowa, United States	
Win	26–3–2	Chris Franco	TKO (doctor stoppage)	SuperBrawl 8	August 4, 1998	1	4:55	Honolulu, Hawaii, United States	
Win	25–3–2	Sam Adkins	Submission (fatigue)	International Fighting Championships 8: Showdown at Shooting Star	June 20, 1998	1	12:53	Mahnomen, Minnesota, United States	
Win	24–3–2	Steve Miller	Submission (rear-naked choke)	World Shoot Wrestling	June 12, 1998	1	5:45	Pasadena, Texas, United States	
Win	23–3–2	John Calvo	TKO (punches)	SuperBrawl 7	April 25, 1998	1	3:38	Guam, United States	
Win	22–3–2	Travis Fulton	Submission (keylock)	Gladiators 2	April 18, 1998	1	10:39	Iowa, United States	
Win	21–3–2	Kevin Rosier	TKO (knees)	Extreme Challenge 15	February 27, 1998	1	0:53	Muncie, Indiana, United States	
Draw	20–3–2	Kimo Leopoldo	Draw (time limit)	Pride 1	October 11, 1997	1	30:00	Tokyo, Japan	
Win	20–3–1	John Renfroe	Submission (keylock)	International Fighting Championships 6: Battle at Four Bears	September 20, 1997	1	2:28	New Town, North Dakota, United States	
Win	19–3–1	John Dixson	TKO (submission to punches)	International Fighting Championships 5: Battle in the Bayou	September 5, 1997	1	2:33	Baton Rouge, Louisiana, United States	
Win	18–3–1	Lance Gibson	Submission (keylock)	SuperBrawl 5	August 23, 1997	1	26:22	Guam, United States	
Win	17–3–1	Paul Buentello	Submission (headlock)	Unified Shoot Wrestling Federation 6	August 16, 1997	1	2:55	Amarillo, Texas, United States	
Win	16–3–1	Ebenezer Fontes Braga	TKO (doctor stoppage)	International Vale Tudo Championship 1: Real Fight Tournament	July 6, 1997	1	8:17	Brazil	
Draw	15–3–1	Jeremy Horn	Draw	Extreme Challenge 7	June 25, 1997	1	20:00	Council Bluffs, Iowa, United States	
Win	15–3	John Renfroe	TKO (punches)	Extreme Challenge 6	May 10, 1997	1	2:29	Battle Creek, Michigan, United States	
Loss	14–3	Mark Coleman	Submission (scarf hold)	UFC 12	February 7, 1997	1	2:57	Dothan, Alabama, United States	For the inaugural UFC Heavyweight Championship. Heavyweight title was unified with the UFC Superfight Championship.
Win	14–2	Steven Goss	Submission (rear-naked choke)	Extreme Challenge 1	November 23, 1996	1	1:53	Des Moines, Iowa, United States	
Win	13–2	Mitsuhiro Matsunaga	Submission (reverse armbar)	U-Japan	November 17, 1996	1	1:32	Tokyo, Japan	
Win	12–2	Mario Neto	Decision	Universal Vale Tudo Fighting 4	October 22, 1996	1	40:00	Brazil	
Win	11–2	Dennis Reed	Submission (neck crank)	Brawl at the Ballpark 1	September 1, 1996	1	4:10	Davenport, Iowa, United States	
Win	10–2	Doug Murphy	Submission (keylock)	Vale Tudo Japan 1996	July 7, 1996	1	3:23	Urayasu, Chiba, Japan	
Win	9–2	Ken Shamrock	Decision (split)	UFC 9	May 17, 1996	1	30:00	Detroit, Michigan, United States	Won the UFC Superfight Championship.
Win	8–2	Oleg Taktarov	Decision (unanimous)	Ultimate Ultimate 1995	December 16, 1995	1	30:00	Denver, Colorado, United States	Won the Ultimate Ultimate 95 Tournament.
Win	7–2	Tank Abbott	Decision (unanimous)	Ultimate Ultimate 1995	December 16, 1995	1	18:00	Denver, Colorado, United States	
Win	6–2	Paul Varelans	Submission (arm-triangle choke)	Ultimate Ultimate 1995	December 16, 1995	1	1:40	Denver, Colorado, United States	
Loss	5–2	Ken Shamrock	Submission (guillotine choke)	UFC 6	July 14, 1995	1	2:14	Casper, Wyoming, United States	For the UFC Superfight Championship.
Win	5–1	Dave Beneteau	Submission (keylock)	UFC 5	April 7, 1995	1	3:01	Charlotte, North Carolina, United States	Won the UFC 5 Tournament.
Win	4–1	Oleg Taktarov	TKO (cut)	UFC 5	April 7, 1995	1	4:21	Charlotte, North Carolina, United States	
Win	3–1	Joe Charles	Submission (rear-naked choke)	UFC 5	April 7, 1995	1	1:38	Charlotte, North Carolina, United States	
Loss	2–1	Royce Gracie	Submission (triangle choke)	UFC 4	December 16, 1994	1	15:49	Tulsa, Oklahoma, United States	
Win	2–0	Marcus Bossett	Submission (arm-triangle choke)	UFC 4	December 16, 1994	1	0:52	Tulsa, Oklahoma, United States	
Win	1–0	Anthony Macias	Submission (choke)	UFC 4	December 16, 1994	1	1:45	Tulsa, Oklahoma, United States	

== See also ==
- The NWA (wrestling stable)
- Ultimate Fighting Championship
- List of professional wrestlers by MMA record

Achievements
Preceded by Ken Shamrock	2nd UFC Superfight Champion; May 17, 1996 – February 7, 1997	Final Superfight
