= Mike Rapada =

American professional wrestler

Personal information
- Born: Michael Rapada; August 28, 1964 (age 61) Merced, California, U.S.

Professional wrestling career
- Ring name(s): Mike Rapada; The Colorado Kid
- Billed height: 6 ft 4 in (193 cm)
- Billed weight: 240 lb (109 kg)
- Billed from: Colorado Springs, Colorado
- Trained by: Jeff Jarrett; Tojo Yamamoto; Ken Wayne
- Debut: 1994

Michael Rapada (born August 28, 1964), best known as "The Colorado Kid" Mike Rapada, is an American professional wrestler.

== Professional wrestling career ==
Mike Rapada started out in Colorado Springs, Colorado. It took three months, but eventually he convinced Jeff Jarrett to hire him. After Jarrett left for the WWF, Rapada sought out training from the likes of Ken Wayne, Buddy Wayne and others.

He also made several appearances on WCW Monday Nitro as a security guard during his career.

In 1994, he was named Rookie of the Year in the United States Wrestling Association promotion out of Memphis. He also had a reign as NAASW North American Heavyweight champion in Jonesboro, Arkansas, beating Cactus Jack, and as USWA Unified World Heavyweight champion, beating Jerry Lawler.

Until winning the NWA World Heavyweight Championship in September 2000, he had been the NWA North American Heavyweight champion, the top belt recognized by the NWA Worldwide promotion based out of Nashville. Colorado Kid teamed with Scuffling Hillbilly and the duo won and held the North American Tag Team title for about 18 months from early 1996 to late 1997.

He was the first American wrestler ever to win a match in China. His son, Mike Rapada Jr., is currently a wrestler on the independent circuit.

In 2001, Mike Rapada moved to San Diego, CA, where he began training local talent and in 2004, Rapada started Southwestern Alliance of Wrestling ("SAW"). SAW had the privilege of wrestling at local elementary schools throughout the San Diego area helping to raise money for military and underprivileged children. SAW also performed at many of the street fairs every year in the local communities and yearly at the Christmas Party that The Nice Guys of San Diego sponsored for the children of San Diego and military families. The event attracted 20,000 people and was held at Qualcomm Stadium. Mike Rapada's vision was to create family friendly professional wrestling shows.

In early 2010, Rapada returned to Nashville where he works and continues to wrestle locally for independent wrestling companies.

== Championships and accomplishments ==
- National Wrestling Alliance
  - NWA World Heavyweight Championship (2 times)
- Ozark Mountain Wrestling/North American All-Star Wrestling/Music City Wrestling/NWA Nashville/NWA Main Event
  - NWA North American Heavyweight Championship (5 times)
  - OMW/NAASW/MCW North American Heavyweight Championship (5 times, final champion)
- Pro Wrestling Zero1
  - NWA Intercontinental Tag Team Championship (1 time) – with Steve Corino
- United States Wrestling Association
  - USWA Unified World Heavyweight Championship (1 time)
  - Rookie of the Year (1994)
