= NWA United States Tag Team Championship (disambiguation) =

NWA United States Tag Team Championship may refer to one of many different versions of the championship used over the years.

- MWA American Tag Team Championship - called the NWA United States Tag Team Championship (Ohio version) from 1950 to 1963
- WWWF United States Tag Team Championship - called the NWA United States Tag Team Championship (Northeast version) from 1958 to 1963
- NWA United States Tag Team Championship (Florida version) - 1961 to 1986
- NWA United States Tag Team Championship (Mid-America version) - 1962 to 1976
- NWA Tri-State Tag Team Championship - called the NWA United States Tag Team Championship (Tri-State version) from 1961 to 1980
- NWA United States Tag Team Championship (Gulf Coast version) - 1965 to 1974
- WCWA World Tag Team Championship - called the NWA United States Tag Team Championship (Texas version) from 1966 to 1967
- WCW United States Tag Team Championship - called the NWA United States Tag Team Championship (Mid-Atlantic version) from 1986 to 1990
- NWA United States Tag Team Championship (New Jersey version) - 1996 to 2000
- NWA United States Tag Team Championship (Lightning One version) - 2022 to present
