= Eddie Gilbert Memorial Brawl =

Professional wrestling event

The Eddie Gilbert Memorial Brawl was an annual professional wrestling event held between 1996 and 1999 as a tribute to wrestler Eddie Gilbert and featured talent from the National Wrestling Alliance, World Wrestling Federation and Extreme Championship Wrestling, as well as local and established independent wrestlers. Each year, the event would feature the Gilbert family receiving a plaque from promoter Dennis Coralluzzo. In 1998, the show came under some criticism when Coralluzzo was alleged to have used the in-ring plaque presentation to publicly attack Paul Heyman, as did the Gilbert family, provoking a verbal altercation between himself and ECW fans in attendance.

The show was also attended by older veterans who had worked with Gilbert during his career and appeared both during the show and at a special "tribute dinner" and wrestling convention held during the weekend. Mick Foley made an appearance at the first convention and later expressed his regret in not wrestling the first show. Brian Hildebrand was honored at the banquet two years later.

Although the original shows were promoted by Coralluzzo and NWA New Jersey, other promotions have held similar events including IWA Mid-South in 1998 and Southeastern Championship Wrestling in 2002. It has been suggested by some in the industry, such as former wrestlers Bob Blackburn and Buddy Landel, that the shows have been used to financially exploit Gilbert's death. Landel, a regular performer for the NWA shows, initially declined Ian Rotten's offer to appear for IWA Mid South's memorial show for this reason.

== Show results ==
=== First Annual Eddie Gilbert Memorial Brawl ===
February 3, 1996 in Cherry Hill, New Jersey (The Armory)

No.	Results	Stipulations	Times
1	Knuckles Nelson defeated The Inferno Kid	Singles match	—
2	Glen Osbourne and Rockin' Rebel defeated Blue Thunder and Harley Lewis via disqualification	Tag team match	—
3	Tommy Gilbert vs. Dory Funk, Jr. ended in a time-limit draw	Singles match	20:00
4	The Lost Boys (Yar and Wolf) defeated The Greek Connection (Gus the Greek and Jimmy Londos) and Bad Attitude (Seek and Destroy) to become the first NWA United States Tag Team Champions	Triangle match	—
5	Johnny Gunn defeated Tommy Rich by pinfall	Singles match	—
6	Debbie Combs, Kevin Lawler and HW Starr defeated Angel, Twiggy Ramiriez and Rik Ratchet by pinfall	Mixed six-man match	—
7	Tommy Cairo (c) defeated Derrick Domino by pinfall	Singles match for the NWA North American Heavyweight Championship	—
8	Ace Darling defeated Kid Flash by pinfall	Singles match	—
9	Doug Gilbert defeated Jerry Lawler by pinfall	Singles match	—
10	Dan Severn (c) defeated Al Snow by pinfall	Singles match for the NWA World Heavyweight Championship	—
(c) / – the champion(s) heading into the match

=== Second Annual Eddie Gilbert Memorial Brawl ===
April 12, 1997 in Cherry Hill, New Jersey (West High School)

No.	Results	Stipulations
1	The Beach Bullies (Ray Odyssey and Inferno Kid) defeated Downward Spiral (Adrian Hall and Twiggy Ramirez) (c)	Tag team match for the NWA United States Tag Team Championship
2	Mr. Puerto Rico defeated Steve Corino	Singles match
3	The Black Scorpion defeated Donnie B. Deviously	Singles match
4	Tommy Gilbert defeated Ian Rotten	Singles match
5	King Kong Bundy defeated Don Montoya	Singles match
6	Lance Diamond defeated Reckless Youth (c) and Cheetah Master	Triangle match for the NWA North American Heavyweight Championship
7	Marty Jannetty defeated Harley Lewis	Singles match
8	Dan Severn (c) vs. Dory Funk, Jr. ended in a double count-out	Singles match for the NWA World Heavyweight Championship
9	I-Con won a battle royal	Battle royal
10	Doug Gilbert defeated Buddy Landell	Singles match
11	Flash Funk defeated Ace Darling	Singles match
12	Goldust defeated Derrick Domino	Singles match
(c) / – the champion(s) heading into the match

=== Third Annual Eddie Gilbert Memorial Brawl ===
February 28, 1998 in Philadelphia, Pennsylvania (Radisson Hotel)

No.	Results	Stipulations
1	Overweight Lover defeated Johnny Rotten by pinfall	Singles match
2	Ray Odyssey defeated Patch by pinfall	Singles match
3	Brittany Brown (with The Fabulous Moolah) defeated Brandi Alexander (with Fred the Elephant Boy) by pinfall	Singles match
4	The Great Caruso defeated Metal Maniac by pinfall	Singles match
5	Rik Ratchett defeated Steve Corino	Singles match
6	Marlena won an arm wrestling match by forfeit when Sunny did not appear	Singles match
7	Lance Diamond defeated Twiggy Ramirez	Singles match
8	Dan Severn (c - NWA) defeated Franz Schumann (c - CWA)	Singles match for the NWA World Heavyweight Championship vs CWA World Middleweight Championship
9	Ace Darling and Devon Storm (with Jim Cornette) defeated The Misfits (Derrik Domino and Harley Lewis)	Tag team match for the vacant NWA United States Tag Team Championship
10	Sid Vicious defeated King Kong Bundy	Singles match
11	Doug and Tommy Gilbert defeated Buddy Landell and Dory Funk, Jr. by pinfall	Tag team match

=== Fourth Annual Eddie Gilbert Memorial Brawl ===
October 2, 1999 in Vineland, New Jersey (Vineland High School)

No.	Results	Stipulations	Times
1	Slayer defeated Lizard	Singles match	—
2	Biggie Biggs won a battle royal	Battle royal	—
3	Rik Ratchet defeated Kevin Knight	Singles match	—
4	Twiggy Ramirez defeated Harley Lewis via disqualification	Singles match	—
5	George Steele defeated Jack Hammer.	Singles match	—
6	The Inferno Kid defeated Judas Young	Singles match	—
7	Trooper Mattola defeated The Shyster	Singles match	6:00
8	King Kong Bundy defeated Biggie Biggs	Singles match	—
9	Tommy Gilbert and Kronus defeated The Public Enemy (Rocco Rock and Johnny Grunge)	Tag team match	—

== See also ==
- List of professional wrestling conventions
