= The Fight Within (film) =

- Directed by: Michael William Gordon
- Written by: Jim Davis
- Story by: Jim Davis
- Starring: Dan Severn
- Cinematography: Dj Dittenhoefer
- Edited by: Wynton Payne
- Music by: Will Musser
- Production company: New Life Cinema
- Distributed by: GVN Releasing
- Release date: August 12, 2016
- Running time: 94 minutes
- Country: United States
- Language: English

The Fight Within is a 2016 American Christian sports film featuring Dan Severn.

== Cast ==
- John Major Davis as Logan Chandler
- Lelia Symington as Emma Jones
- Matt Leddo as Hayden Dressler
- Mike H. Taylor as Mason Chandler
- Wesley Williams as Michael
- Dan Severn as Rich Chandler

== Reception ==
The film has a 40% rating on Rotten Tomatoes. Noel Murray of the Los Angeles Times gave the film a negative review and wrote that it "is too generic as a sports flick, and too pro forma as a tract. There’s more vitality and humanity in the closing-credits blooper reel than in anything in the actual picture." Joe Leydon of Variety also gave the film a negative review and described it as "clunky and didactic, and the movie as a whole has appreciably less mainstream appeal than several other recent, and much better, faith-based dramas."

However, Lawrence Toppman of The Charlotte Observer gave the film a positive review and wrote, "So when a filmmaker seems to wrestle seriously with (religious belief), I listen. In the case of The Fight Within, I’m glad I did." Edwin L. Carpenter of The Dove Foundation also gave the film a positive review and wrote that "(t)he acting, writing and direction all come together in this movie."
