= NWA North American Heavyweight Championship =

Professional wrestling championship

- The current NWA North American Heavyweight Championship belt.

Details
- Promotion: NWA; WWF (1998)
- Date established: October 30, 1994
- Date retired: September 30, 2017
Statistics
- First champion: Greg Valentine
- Final champion: Mustang Mike
- Most reigns: Mike Rapada (5 reigns)
- Longest reign: JT Wolfen (741 days)
- Shortest reign: Barry Windham (1 day)

The NWA North American Heavyweight Championship, also known simply as the NWA North American Championship, was a professional wrestling championship created by the National Wrestling Alliance in 1994 after World Championship Wrestling withdrew from the NWA. There were various regional versions of the North American title before the creation of this all-NWA recognised North American championship. From 1998 to 2000, the title was the major championship in Music City Wrestling.

== Title history ==
From 1994 to 2017, there were forty six total championship reigns. Greg Valentine was the inaugural champion. The record for most reigns is held by Mike Rapada, who won the title five times. The record for longest reign is held by JT Wolfen, who held the belt for 742 days.

No.	Wrestler	Reign	Date	Days held	Location	Event	Notes	Ref.
1	Greg Valentine	1	October 30, 1994	69	N/A		Valentine was awarded the title. He held the title for at least the number of days shown, as it is unknown when during the month he was awarded the title.	
2	Kevin Von Erich	1	January 7, 1995	8	Dallas, TX	NWA Dallas		
3	John Hawk	1	January 15, 1995	62	Dallas, TX	NWA Dallas		
4	Greg Valentine	2	March 18, 1995	44	Dallas, TX	NWA Dallas		
—	Vacated	—	May 1, 1995	—	N/A		The title was vacated when Jim Crockett, Jr.'s NWA Dallas closed. Valentine held the title for at least the number of days shown, as it is unknown when during the month NWA Dallas closed.	
5	Tommy Cairo	1	June 24, 1995	441	Williamstown, NJ	NWA New Jersey	Defeated Devon Storm in a tournament final after the title moved to NWA Championship Wrestling America/New Jersey.	
6	Reckless Youth	1	September 7, 1996	217	Yardville, NJ	NWA New Jersey	Defeated Derrick Domino after Cairo no-showed.	
7	Lance Diamond	1	April 12, 1997	14	Cherry Hill, NJ	NWA 2nd Annual Eddie Gilbert Memorial Brawl		
8	Ace Darling	1	April 26, 1997	49	Wilmington, DE			
9	Reckless Youth	2	June 14, 1997	198	Vineland, NJ	NWA New Jersey		
—	Vacated	—	December 29, 1997	—	N/A		The title was vacated so it could be used in an NWA angle in the World Wrestling Federation.	
10	Jeff Jarrett	1	January 5, 1998	55	New Haven, CT	WWF Raw is War	Defeated Barry Windham to win the vacant championship.	
11	Barry Windham	1	March 1, 1998	1	N/A		Windham was awarded the title by Jim Cornette after Jarrett left Cornette's NWA group.	
—	Vacated	—	March 2, 1998	—	N/A		The NWA stripped Windham of the title.	
12	The Colorado Kid	1	August 1, 1998	147	Nashville, TN		Defeated Recon. Colorado Kid had already won the Music City Wrestling title from Recon on July 25 in Lebanon, Tennessee. This match was decided to be for the NWA title by the NWA Board of Directors and MCW. The NWA title then replaced the MCW title, as both were being defended in MCW.	
13	Chris Michaels	1	December 26, 1998	14	Nashville, TN			
14	The Colorado Kid	2	January 9, 1999	246	Nashville, TN			
15	Big Bully Douglas	1	September 12, 1999	48	Nashville, TN			
16	Mike Rapada	3	October 30, 1999	7	Lebanon, TN			
17	Terry Taylor	1	November 6, 1999	49	Nashville, TN			
18	The Colorado Kid	4	December 25, 1999	138	Nashville, TN			
19	Air Paris	1	May 11, 2000	9	Fairview, TN			
20	Chris Harris	1	May 20, 2000	117	Nashville, TN			
21	Mike Rapada	5	September 14, 2000	6	Lebanon, TN			
—	Vacated	—	September 20, 2000	—	N/A		The title was vacated after Rapada won the NWA World Heavyweight Championship.	
22	Steve Corino	1	April 13, 2001	8	North Richland Hills, TX	NWA Southwest Lonestar Slamfest	Defeated Redd Dogg.	
23	Robbie Royce	1	April 21, 2001	85	Winnipeg, Manitoba, Canada	CWF		
—	Vacated	—	July 15, 2001	—	N/A		The title was vacated after Royce left the Canadian Wrestling Federation.	
24	Dark Rain	1	July 29, 2001	28	St. Boniface, Manitoba, Canada	CWF	Defeated Gene Swan in tournament final.	
25	Spyder	1	August 26, 2001	48	St. Boniface, Manitoba, Canada	CWF		
26	Quinn Magnum	1	October 13, 2001	350	St. Petersburg, FL	NWA 53rd Anniversary Show - Battle Of The Belts 2001: An NWA Odyssey		
27	Paul Atlas	1	September 28, 2002	28	McKeesport, PA	NWA East		
28	Jorge Estrada	1	October 26, 2002	189	Corpus Christi, TX	NWA 54th Anniversary Show: Battle Of The Belts 2002		
29	Hotstuff Hernandez	1	May 3, 2003	147	Cornelia, GA	NWA Wildside		
30	JT Wolfen	1	September 27, 2003	742	Hawaii, HI			
31	Tommy Marr	1	October 8, 2005	196	Nashville, TN	NWA 57th Anniversary Show & Convention		
32	Dru Onyx	1	April 22, 2006	489	Altamonte Springs, FL	SCW Spring Breakout		
33	Damien Wayne	1	August 24, 2007	106	Las Vegas, NV	NWA Pro Wrestling Summit		
34	Mike DiBiase	1	December 8, 2007	511	Elkin, NC			
35	Apolo	1	May 2, 2009	273	Tyler, TX	NWA Showcase		
36	The Sheik (II)	1	January 30, 2010	451	Fort Pierce, FL	PWF Pandemonium At The Pal		
—	Vacated	—	April 26, 2011	—	N/A		The title was vacated after The Sheik won the NWA World Heavyweight Championship.	
37	Shaun Tempers	1	June 25, 2011	475	Cornelia, GA	NWA Anarchy	Tempers defeated Ace Rockwell to win the vacant title.	
38	Carson	1	October 12, 2012	91	Cypress, TX	NWA Houston Redemption		
39	Byron Wilcott	1	January 11, 2013	99	Cypress, TX	NWA Houston Next Level 2013		
40	Kahagas	1	April 20, 2013	391	Houston, TX	NWA Houston Parade Of Champions: A Tribute To Paul Boesch		
41	Byron Wilcott	2	May 16, 2014	154	Sherman, TX	NWA Texoma		
42	Tim Storm	1	October 17, 2014	177	Sherman, TX			
43	Jax Dane	1	April 12, 2015	46	Las Vegas, NV	Vendetta Pro Casino Royale	Dane becomes holder of two titles, as he is also the reigning National Heavyweight Champion. NWA allows Dane to defend both titles together.	
—	Vacant	—	May 28, 2015	—	N/A		Jax Dane forced to forfeit both of his titles after sustaining an injury. A tournament to fill the vacant title is announced.	
44	Tim Storm	2	July 17, 2015	365	Sherman, TX		Defeated Andy Anderson in a tournament final to win the vacant title.	
45	Tyson Dean	1	July 16, 2016	266	Pavo, GA	NWA SW Southern Summer Showcase		
46	Mustang Mike	1	April 8, 2017	175	Amelia, LA			
—	Retired	—	September 30, 2017	—	—		Retired when NWA terminates the contracts with its licensees	

== Combined reigns ==
Rank	Wrestler	No. of reigns	Combined days
1	JT Wolfen	1	742
2	Tim Storm	2	542
3	The Colorado Kid/Mike Rapada	5	538
4	Mike DiBiase	1	511
5	Dru Onyx	1	489
6	Shaun Tempers	1	475
7	The Sheik	1	451
8	Tommy Cairo	1	441
9	Reckless Youth	2	415
10	Kahagas	1	391
11	Quinn Magnum	1	350
12	Mustang Mike	1	308
13	Apolo	1	273
14	Tyson Dean	1	266
15	Byron Wilcott	2	253
16	Tommy Marr	1	196
17	Jorge Estrada	1	189
18	Hotstuff Hernandez	1	147
19	Chris Harris	1	117
20	Greg Valentine	2	112
21	Damien Wayne	1	106
22	Carson	1	91
23	Robbie Royce	1	85
24	John Hawk	1	63
25	Jeff Jarrett	1	55
26	Ace Darling	1	49
26	Terry Taylor	1	49
27	Big Bully Douglas	1	48
27	Spyder	1	48
29	Jax Dane	1	46
30	Dark Rain	1	28
30	Paul Atlas	1	28
34	Chris Michaels	1	14
34	Lance Diamond	1	14
35	Air Paris	1	9
36	Steve Corino	1	8
37	Kevin Von Erich	1	7
38	Barry Windham	1	1

== See also ==
- List of National Wrestling Alliance championships
