= NWA United States Tag Team Championship (New Jersey version) =

Professional wrestling tag team championship

NWA World Tag Team Championship (New Jersey version)
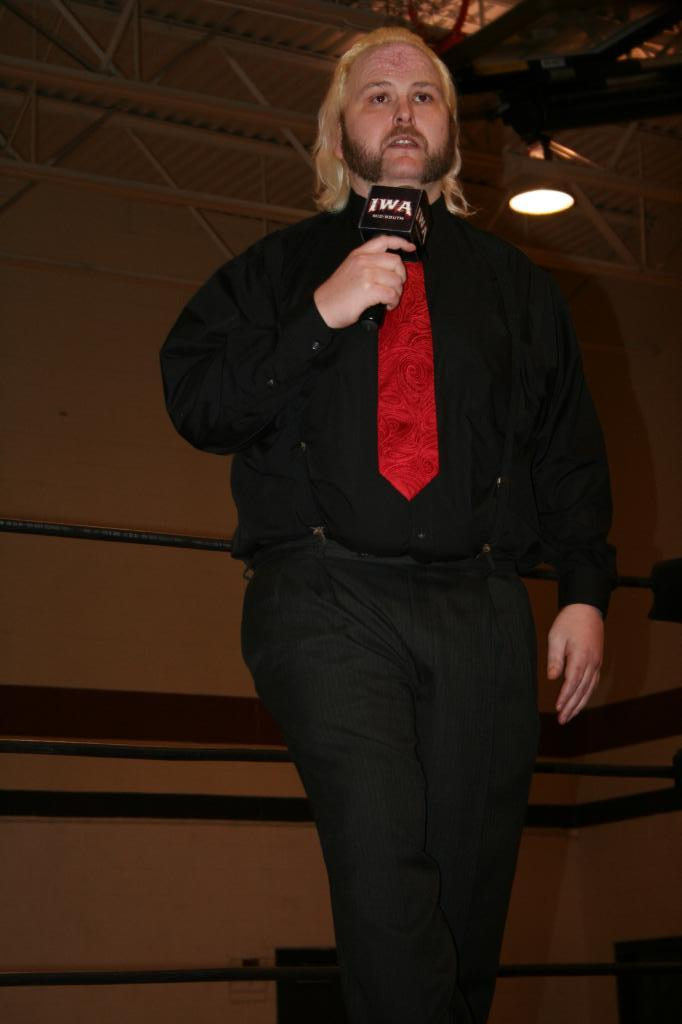
- Ian Rotten, one half of the eighth NWA United States Tag Team Champions with his partner Blaze

Details
- Promotion: NWA Jersey
- Date established: February 3, 1996
- Date retired: April 7, 2000
Statistics
- First champions: The Lost Boys (Yar and Wolf)
- Most reigns: The Misfits (Derek Domino and Harley Lewis) (4 reigns)
- Longest reign: Bad Additude (Seek and Destroy)
- Shortest reign: The Misfits (Derek Domino and Harley Lewis)

The New Jersey version of the NWA United States Tag Team Championship was a professional wrestling tag team championship contested for in the New Jersey–based National Wrestling Alliance (NWA) promotion. The title was only contestable by tag teams in tag team matches. The title was established on February 3, 1996, by NWA Jersey, in which The Lost Boys (Yar and Wolf) won a Triangle tag team match against The Greek Connection (Gus the Greek and Jimmy Londos) and Bad Attitude (Seek and Destroy). This title is one of at least five championships that share the same name under the NWA's supervision. On April 7, 2000, the final champions The Pitbulls (#1 and #2) lost the titles to Chris Candido and Tommy Cairo; however, the NWA reversed the decision and instead of returning the titles to The Pitbulls, the promotion retired the championship for unknown reasons.

Overall, there have been 17 reigns that have occurred in the United States. From the information known, The Misfits (Derek Domino and Harley Lewis)' fourth reign was the longest in the title's history, at 204 days; their and Downward Spiral (Adrian Hall and Twiggy Ramirez)'s first reigns, respectively, were the shortest, at 21 days. In addition to reigns held by wrestlers, there was one vacant reign, in which the title had to be stripped from the champions.

== Title history ==
Key
No.	Overall reign number
Reign	Reign number for the specific champion
Days	Number of days held

No.	Champion	Championship change			Reign statistics		Notes	Ref.
No.	Champion	Date	Event	Location	Reign	Days	Notes	Ref.
1	The Lost Boys (Yar and Wolf)	February 3, 1996	Eddie Gilbert Memorial show	Cherry Hill, New Jersey	1	84	The NWA's version of the United States Tag Team Title was revived by their subsidiary NWA Jersey. The Lost Boys (Yar and Wolf) won the titles in a Triangle tag team match against The Greek Connection (Gus the Greek and Jimmy Londos) and Bad Attitude (Seek and Destroy).	
2	Bad Attitude (Seek and Destroy)	April 27, 1996	Live event	Yardville, New Jersey	1	214		
3	Downward Spinal; Adrian Hall and Twiggy Ramirez	November 16, 1996	Live event	Blackwood, New Jersey	1	21		
4	The Lost Boys (Yar and Wolf)	December 7, 1996	Live event	Mount Holly, New Jersey	2	91		
5	Downward Spinal; Adrian Hall and Twiggy Ramirez	March 8, 1997	Live event	Paulsboro, New Jersey	2	35		
6	Beach Bullies (Inferno Kid and Ray Odyssey	April 12, 1997	Live event	Yardville, New Jersey	1	63		
7	The Misfits (Derek Domino and Harley Lewis)	June 14, 1997	Live event	Vineland, New Jersey	1	98		
8	Blaze and Ian Rotten	September 20, 1997	Live event	Bardstown, Kentucky	1	104		
—	Vacated	January 22, 1998	—	—	—	—	Rotten surrendered the titles to NWA management for unknown reasons.	
9	The Misfits (Derek Domino and Harley Lewis)	February 7, 1998	Live event	Somerdale, New Jersey	2	21	Defeated Twiggy Ramirez and Devon Storm to win the vacant titles	
10	Ace Darling and Devon Storm	February 28, 1998	Live event	Philadelphia, Pennsylvania	1	22		
11	The Misfits (Derek Domino and Harley Lewis)	March 22, 1998	Live event	Garfield, New Jersey	3	131		
12	Steve Corino and Lance Diamond	July 31, 1998	Live event	Mount Holly, New Jersey	1	22		
13	The Pitbulls #1 and #2	August 22, 1998	Live event	Mount Holly, New Jersey	1	83		
14	The Misfits (Derek Domino and Harley Lewis)	November 13, 1998	Live event	Hazlet, New Jersey	4	204		
15	Doug Gilbert and Buddy Landell	June 5, 1999	Live event	Holmdel, New Jersey	1	178		
16	The Public Enemy (Johnny Grunge and Rocco Rock	October 30, 1999	Live event	North Brunswick, New Jersey	1	42	Defeated Gilbert and Tommy Rich, who was a substitute for an injured Landell	
17	The Pitbulls #1 and #2	December 11, 1999	Live event	West Deptford Township, New Jersey	2	118		
—	Deactivated	April 7, 2000	Live event	Toms River, New Jersey	—	—	Chris Candido and Tommy Cairo won the titles on April 7, 2000; however, the NWA reversed the decision and instead of returning the titles to The Pitbulls, the promotion retired the championship for unknown reasons.	

== See also ==
- List of National Wrestling Alliance championships
