= Phoenix Championship Wrestling =

American independent professional wrestling promotion

- Acronym: PCW
- Founded: 2001
- Style: Hardcore, shoot style
- Headquarters: Toms River, New Jersey
- Founder(s): Don Bucci; Mike Bucci
- Owner: Don "Donnie B" Bucci (2001-2003)
- Website: PhoenixWrestling.com; Phoenix Championship Wrestling on Myspace

Phoenix Championship Wrestling was an American independent professional wrestling promotion based in Toms River, New Jersey. It was founded by twin brothers Don and Mike Bucci in 2001 and promoted by Don Bucci until its close two years later. The promotion enjoyed a high degree of success during its existence and was home to many independent wrestlers in the Jersey Shore and Mid-Atlantic region later signed to both Total Non-Stop Action and World Wrestling Entertainment.

Stars from both promotions made appearances for PCW such as TNA's Alexis Laree, Frankie Kazarian, Amazing Red and The S.A.T. (Jose and Joel Maximo). The Wall and the Harris Brothers were also signed to TNA while competing for the promotion. From the World Wrestling Federation included former and then current superstars such as Jimmy Snuka, Gillberg, Gangrel, Eddie Guerrero and Three Minute Warning (Rosey and Jamal). A number of WWE developmental wrestlers from Ohio Valley Wrestling spent time in the promotion including Kara Drew, Charlie Haas, Mike Kruel, Tank Toland and The Basham Brothers (Doug and Danny Basham).

Mike Bucci, a mainstay of Extreme Championship Wrestling, was also able to bring in many of its stars prior to and following the promotion's close in 2003. Among these included Prodigy, Chris Chetti, Little Guido, Jerry Lynn, Crowbar, Steve Corino, Julio Dinero, Chris Hamrick, Tommy Dreamer, Raven, Joey Matthews & Christian York and the "heel" stable Triple Threat ("Franchise" Shane Douglas, Chris Candido and Bam Bam Bigelow). Both Bucci and Prodigy would win titles in the promotion, Prodigy being the first PCW Television Champion.

Despite the fierce competitive environment among independent Mid-Atlantic promotions, the smaller PCW had working relationships with several of its rivals allowing appearances by Nicky Benz and Ric Blade from Combat Zone Wrestling, and Michael Shane, "Fallen Angel" Christopher Daniels and Samoa Joe from Ring of Honor. PCW also featured many established independent wrestlers, not only in the Jersey Shore and Mid-Atlantic region, but from throughout the United States and Canada. The mix of wrestlers would occasionally result in unofficial interpromotional matches that would not normally be seen in mainstream companies. The promotion also had a weekly Public-access television cable TV series, Fire Bird TV, and many of its supercards and televised events were later released on VHS/DVD by Smart Mark Video and RF Video.

== History ==
=== Early history ===
In 2001, Phoenix Championship Wrestling was established in Toms River, New Jersey by wrestling manager Don Bucci and his twin brother Mike Bucci, then wrestling for Extreme Championship Wrestling as Super Nova. Don Bucci, a 10-year veteran who had managed a number of wrestlers in the National Wrestling Alliance during the 1990s, was the primary promoter for PCW and ran the day-to-day operations up until its close. He had originally decided to form PCW, according to a later interview, after "watching all the other bad indies out there, especially in this area. I was tired of seeing the people get ripped off." He was especially supportive of allowing more creative control by wrestlers, providing fair pay and a safe working environment. Bucci claimed to have gotten the idea for the "Phoenix" name while driving behind a Firebird and noticed the car's emblem.

Having had previous experience as a booker and promoter in the New York-New Jersey area for the National Wrestling Alliance and the World Wide Wrestling Alliance, as well running occasional shows under Big Buc Productions in the Toms River area since 1999, Don Bucci was able to bring in independent stars he had previously worked with including Harley Lewis, The Wall, Donnie Bon Jovi, Slayer, Father Ozzy, Matt Vandal, Mike Preston and Prodigy. Though his brother Mike, Frankie Kazarian, Christopher Daniels and Samoa Joe also agreed to appearances for the promotion. Kazarain, who would have a successful stint in the promotion, later said in a November 2002 interview that PCW was one of his favorite places to work and "definitely one of the best Indy feds in the country."

The promotion's heavyweight title was introduced at its first card in Stanhope, New Jersey on March 3, 2001, and won by Harley Lewis in a singles match against Dr. Hurtz. This would be one of Hurtz's final wrestling matches before retiring several months later but would remain with PCW as a manager and later became the promotion's commissioner. Also at that event, The Backseat Boyz (Trent Acid and Johnny Kashmere) were crowned the first tag team champions after defeating Combat Zone Wrestling's Ric Blade and Nicky Benz. They would eventually lose the titles to Evolution (Nova and Frankie Kazarian) in a 3-Way Dance with Joey Matthews & Christian York in Monroeville, Pennsylvania four months later. On August 9, the promotion held the "Battle of the Bay" supercard in Lavalette, New Jersey with The Wall in the main event. The following month, The Wall also joined Crowbar and Tommy Dreamer for an event at Toms River High School East on September 28, 2001.

=== Fire Bird TV ===
The promotion soon began a weekly Public-access television series on Comcast Cable-affiliate Channel 21, Fire Bird TV, which aired in Toms River as well as the Seaside Heights, Seaside Park, Beachwood, and Bayville areas. Around this time, both Extreme Championship Wrestling and World Championship Wrestling had folded and a large number of its former stars were forced to work on the independent circuit. Bucci believed that with the abundance of talent and high quality television production of Fire Bird TV would help gain an edge over his other competitors. This formula, Bucci later claimed, was "borrowed" by other independent promotions. Eddy Guerrero, Jerry Lynn, Gangrel and Bam Bam Bigelow were among the first big stars to work for the company.

One of PCW's first major supercards, Winter Wonder Slam '02, was held at the Recreation Station in Toms River on January 11, 2002. the main event featured an interpromotional match between K-Kwik and Chris Hamrick. At the time of the match, Hamrick was working for Total Non-Stop Action while K-Kwik was in World Wrestling Entertainment. Also on the card, ECW's Prodigy beat "Ramblin'" Rich Myers to become the promotion's first television champion. Myers was then a mainstay of the Mid-Eastern Wrestling Federation. The next month in Toms River, Mike Bucci and Eddy Guerrero wrestled a match lasting 30 minutes. Guerrero addressed the audience after the match praising both Bucci and Phoenix Championship Wrestling. The event, according to Don Bucci, is his favorite moment and one of the most memorable in the promotion's history.

=== Farewell to Nova ===
In May 2002, Mike Bucci announced he had signed a contract with World Wrestling Entertainment. Later that month, the promotion held a special event in Toms River, Farewell to Nova, which would see Bucci wrestle his last match in PCW before making his WWE debut as "Simon Dean". Bucci teamed with Frankie Kazarian and Chris Chetti in a 6-man tag team match to defeat Cham Pain, Joey Matthews & Christian York. At the end of the night, he gave a farewell speech and then he and Kazarian vacated the tag team titles. Kazarian would win the PCW Television Championship from Prodigy the following night. At that same event, Harley Lewis lost the PCW Heavyweight Championship to The Wall in a Tables, Ladders and Doors match. Lewis had held the title for over a year and set a 14-month record as its longest reigning champion. In addition, a match between The Prophet and "Jumbo" Joe Gunns resulted in over 500 people in the audience pelting the loser, The Prophet, with fresh produce as part of a pre-match stipulation. Bucci's departure from the company would be the first of many of the promotion's regular stars to sign contracts with TNA and WWE.

=== Russ Haas Memorial Tag Team Tournament ===
On August 31, 2002, Phoenix Championship Wrestling held a special tribute show for Russ Haas, brother and tag team partner of fellow WWE developmental wrestler Charlie Hass, to raise money for his family. The event, the Haas Memorial Tag Team Tournament, was held at Recreation Station in Toms River and featured a number of wrestlers from World Wrestling Entertainment. The tournament had a unique format with the first round matches being three-way matches with double elimination rules, as opposed to traditional single team matches, and included PCW Tag Team Champions The United Nations (Tiger Khan & Prophet), Steve Corino & Amazing Red, The S.A.T. (Jose and Joel Maximo), Chris Divine & Quiet Storm, Malice & Seven, Da Hit Squad, Joey Matthews & Christian York, Bo Dupp & Matt Vandal (substituting for Pete Gas), Lance Cade & Nick Dinsmore, and The Ballard Brothers. The tournament was eventually won by Charlie Haas & Nova defeating Doug Basham and Damaja in the finals. Jerry Lynn, Low Ki and The Island Boys (Jamal and Rosey) were also on the card. Both the tournament and non-tournament matches were billed as "first time ever" meetings by the promotion, most notably, Frankie Kazarian defending the PCW Television Championship against Low Ki. The show's undercard pitted Kid Knight, a disc jockey and on-air personality for 98.5 FM, against Little Ricky in a lumberjack match. This was the second memorial show held in memory of Russ Hass, Jersey All Pro Wrestling had held a similar event several months before.

=== Later years ===
On November 2, 2002, Diamond Dallas Page headlined a PCW fundraiser at a local middle school in his hometown of Point Pleasant, New Jersey, and participated in an autograph signing afterwards. This was one of Page's first matches following his departure from WWE earlier that year.

Another major supercard, March Madness, was held in Lacey, New Jersey on March 22, 2003. After nearly a year as champion, Malace was stripped of the heavyweight title with only two months of breaking former champion Harley Lewis's record. Meanwhile, Kappa Tegga Kappa (Andy Jaxx and Curt Daniels) defeated The United Nations (The Prophet and Tiger Khan) for tag team titles. The titles had been vacant since the "Farewell to Nova" card the previous year. Two months later at Mayhem Massacre in Manchester, Matt Vandal won a tournament to win the vacant heavyweight title defeating Frankie Kazarian in the finals.

On June 14, 2003, its last event was held at Toms River High School East in Toms River. The Moxie Family (Romeo Roselli, Damian Adams and Rob Eckos) won the tag team titles from Kappa Tegga Kappa and Donnie Bon Jovi in a Three Way Elimination match against Frankie Kazarian and Mike Kruel to win the heavyweight title. The company, which had been in decline since Mike Bucci signed with WWE, eventually closed at the end of the summer.

== Championships ==
=== PCW Heavyweight Championship ===
The PCW Heavyweight Championship was the primary singles championship title in Phoenix Championship Wrestling. It was first won by Harley Lewis who defeated Dr. Hurtz at PCW's first event in Stanhope, New Jersey on March 3, 2001. The title was defended throughout New Jersey for the next two years, although vacant for a 5-month period in early-2003, until its close.

Wrestler:	Times:	Date:	Location:	Notes:
Harley Lewis	1	March 3, 2001	Stanhope, New Jersey	Defeated Dr. Hurtz to become recognized as the first champion.
The Wall	1	May 17, 2002	Toms River, New Jersey	Won the title in a "Tables, Ladders and Doors" match at PCW's "Farewell to Nova" card.
The Wall was stripped of the title in Lacey, New Jersey on March 22, 2003, and remained vacant for the next several months.'
Matt Vandal	1	May 3, 2003	Manchester, New Jersey	Defeated Frankie Kazarian in a tournament final to win the vacant title.

=== PCW Television Championship ===
The PCW Television Championship was the secondary singles title in Phoenix Championship Wrestling. It was first won by Prodigy after defeating "Ramblin'" Rich Myers in Toms River, New Jersey on January 11, 2002. The title, introduced at the height of the promotion's popularity, was frequently defended on PCW's weekly Public-access television cable TV series, Fire Bird TV as well as throughout New Jersey until the promotion's close in 2003.

Wrestler:	Times:	Date:	Location:	Notes:
Prodigy	1	January 11, 2002	Toms River, New Jersey	Defeated "Ramblin'" Rich Myers to be recognized as the first champion.
Frankie Kazarian	1	May 18, 2002	Jersey City, New Jersey	
Donnie Bon Jovi	1	June 14, 2003	Toms River, New Jersey	Won title in a 3-Way Dance with Frankie Kazarian and Mike Kruel at Toms River High School East; this was the last event held by the promotion.

=== PCW Tag Team Championship ===
The PCW Tag Team Championship was the primary tag team title for Phoenix Championship Wrestling. It was the second championship introduced by the promotion and first won by The Backseat Boyz (Trent Acid and Johnny Kashmere) from Combat Zone Wrestling's Ric Blade & Nicky Benz in Stanhope, New Jersey on March 3, 2001. It was frequently defended in both Pennsylvania and New Jersey, with exception to the 10-month period when it was vacated, from 2001 until the promotion's close two years later.

Wrestler:	Times:	Date:	Location:	Notes:
The Backseat Boyz (Trent Acid and Johnny Kashmere)	1	March 3, 2001	Stanhope, New Jersey	Defeated Ric Blade & Nicky Benz to become the first champions.
Evolution (Nova and Frankie Kazarian)	1	July 20, 2001	Monroeville, Pennsylvania	Won the titles in a 3-Way Dance with The Backseat Boyz and Joey Matthews & Christian York.
The PCW Tag Team Championship is vacated after Nova leaves the promotion for World Wrestling Entertainment. Nova and Frankie Kazarian surrender the titles at PCW's "Farewell to Nova" show in Toms River, New Jersey on May 17, 2002. Their last title defense was a six-man tag team match with Chris Chetti against Cham Pain, Joey Matthews & Christian York.
Kappa Tegga Kappa (Andy Jaxx and Curt Daniels)	1	March 22, 2003	Lacey, New Jersey	Defeated The United Nations (The Prophet and Tiger Khan) to win the vacant title.
The Moxie Family (Romeo Roselli, Damian Adams and Rob Eckos)	1	June 14, 2003	Toms River, New Jersey	Taking place at Toms River High School East, this was the last event held by the promotion.
