= Damien Wayne =

American professional wrestler (born 1971)

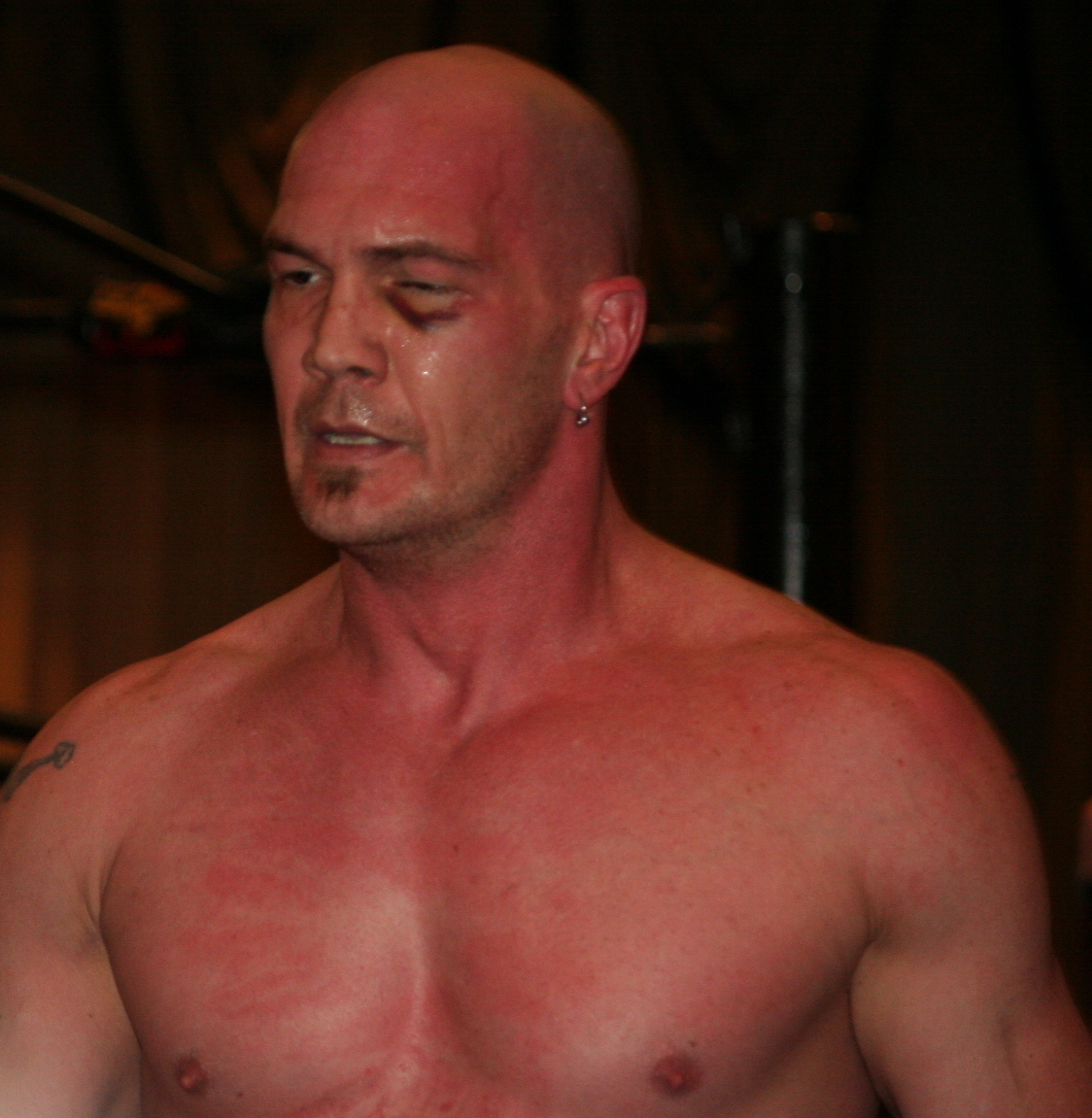
- Portrait of Wayne with NWA DAWG Championship, 2010

Personal information
- Born: Damien Wayne Kostyal; December 18, 1971 (age 54) Hampton, Virginia, U.S.

Professional wrestling career
- Ring name(s): Damien Wayne; Wayne Kostyal
- Billed height: 6 ft 1 in (1.85 m)
- Billed weight: 220 lb (100 kg)
- Billed from: Hampton, Virginia
- Trained by: Phil Brown; Preston Quinn; Tully Blanchard
- Debut: August 10, 2002

Damien Wayne Kostyal (born December 18, 1971), better known by his ring name Damien Wayne, is an American professional wrestler. He is a 3-time holder of the NWA National Heavyweight Championship and former holder of the NWA North American Heavyweight Championship. He is a former AIWF World Heavyweight Champion.

== Professional wrestling career ==
Wayne made his debut August 10, 2002, teaming with T.E. Brown against then VCW Tag Team Champions Greg Steel and Idol X.

Wayne has competed in WWE, Ring of Honor, and Full Impact Pro, where he was a member of The Heartbreak Express.

=== DAWG ===
Wayne made his Dangerous Adrenaline Wrestling Gladiators (DAWG) debut February 19, 2011, retaining the NWA Continental Championship against Vordell Walker. On May 14, 2011, at Squared Circle Wrestling Alliance in Eden, North Carolina, Damien Wayne defeated Chance Prophet for the DAWG Championship. He has gone on to defend the championship 50 times to date in Eight separate states, to challengers such as Julio Dinero, Johnny Calzone, D. J. Hyde, Vordell Walker, Kahagas, Cueball Carmichael, Gunner, CW Anderson & Marty Jannetty.

On November 2, 2012, Wayne was involved in an eight-way elimination match for the vacant NWA World Heavyweight Championship. The final two competitors consisted of Wayne and longtime rival Chance Prophet. NWA National Heavyweight Champion Kahagas then inserted himself into the match. From this distraction, Wayne was able to eliminate Prophet, but would go on to be defeated by Kahagas.

Damien's 1001-day DAWG Championship reign was ended on February 8, 2014 by Dirty Money on a NECW event in Beverly, Mass.

== Championships and accomplishments ==
- United States Wrestling Organization
  - USWO Tag Team Championship (1 time, current) – with Colby Carter
- Allied Independent Wrestling Federations
  - AIWF World Heavyweight Championship (2 time)
- America's Most Liked Wrestling
  - AML Tag Team Championship (1 time) - with CW Anderson
- Dangerous Adrenaline Wrestling Gladiators
  - DAWG Heavyweight Championship (1 time)
- G.O.U.G.E. Wrestling
  - G.O.U.G.E. North Carolina Championship (1 time)
- NWA CIW
  - NWA Midwest Tag Team Championship (1 time) — with Lance Erikson
- Revolution Wrestling Authority
  - RWA World Heavyweight Championship (1 time)
  - RWA Extreme Championship (1 time)
- NWA EDGE
  - NWA National Heavyweight Championship (3 times)
- NWA Fusion/NWA Virginia
  - NWA Virginia Heavyweight Championship/NWA Continental Heavyweight Championship (4 times)
  - NWA Virginia Tag Team Championship (1 time) — with Mike Booth
  - King of the Mid-Atlantic Tournament (2010)
- RAGE Wrestling Warrior
  - RAGE World Tag Team Championship (1 time) –with CW Anderson
- NWA Pro
  - NWA North American Heavyweight Championship (1 time)
- NWA Smoky Mountain
  - NWA Mid Atlantic Tag Team Championship (1 time) —with Lance Erikson
- NWA Southern All-Star Wrestling
  - NWA Southern Tag Team Championship (1 time) —with Lance Erikson
  - NWA United States Tag Team Championship (1 time) — with Lance Erikson
- United Elite Wrestling
  - UEW Heavyweight Championship (1 time)
  - Got Your Six Tournament (2019)
- Old School Federation
  - OSF Championship (1 time)
- Wildkat Pro Wrestling
  - Wildkat Tag Team Championship (1 time) – with Brady Pierce
- Pro Wrestling Illustrated
  - PWI ranked him #301 of the 500 best singles wrestlers of the year in the PWI 500 in 2013
- New South Championship Wrestling
  - New South Heavyweight Championship (1 time)
- Squared Circle Wrestling Alliance
  - SCWA Heavyweight Championship (1 time)
- United Pro Wrestling
  - UPW Championship (1 time)
- Vanguard Championship Wrestling
  - VCW Heavyweight Championship (2 time)
  - VCW United States Liberty Championship (1 time)
  - VCW Tag Team Championship (2 times) — with Mike Booth
