= Skip Hall (martial artist) =

American mixed martial arts fighter

- Born: J. Skip Hall; September 9, 1944 (age 82); Birmingham, Alabama, U.S.
- Other names: No Mercy, Disturbed
- Nationality: American
- Height: 5 ft 9 in (1.75 m)
- Weight: 205 lb (93 kg; 14.6 st)
- Division: Light Heavyweight
- Team: Skip Hall's Martial Arts Center

Mixed martial arts record
- Total: 8
- Wins: 2
- By submission: 2
- Losses: 5
- By knockout: 2
- By submission: 3
- No contests: 1

Other information
- Mixed martial arts record from Sherdog

J. "Skip" Hall (born September 9, 1944) is a former mixed martial artist and IBM sales manager. At 57, "Skip" claimed to be the oldest pro-debuting fighter, and in 2008 at the age of 63 he gained a measure of notoriety as an unusually old combat sports athlete. He was a participant in the Jasper City Slugfest in August 2006 against former UFC Superfight Champion Dan Severn, and retired in 2009 from active MMA fighting after declaring himself "Oldest Active MMA Fighter in history."

== Biography ==
Hall served in the U.S. Army, stationed in Korea as a Clerk Typist. He later became something of a novelty attraction as a mixed martial arts fighter over the age of 60 with limited in-ring success. In 2008, Skip's simultaneous status as an active fighter and senior citizen - as well as since-debunked claims about his special forces background - led to a series of uncritical profiles by various media outlets.

== Military service claims ==
Hall claimed he served in the U.S. Army Special Forces during the Vietnam war, as a "5th SF SOG A Team Leader."- a leadership position in a legendary special operations unit that conducted clandestine missions throughout the conflict.

Attention to Hall's Special Forces claims arose due to a profile written in 2008 by NBC Sports writer Mike Chiappetta. That article led to a FOIA (Freedom of Information Act) request for his official records by Special Forces veterans who were not convinced of Hall's claims. The FOIA report clearly stated Hall did not serve in the U.S. Army Special Forces, nor did he ever deploy to Vietnam as he had claimed for years. His service was as a 71B (Clerk Typist), stationed in Korea.

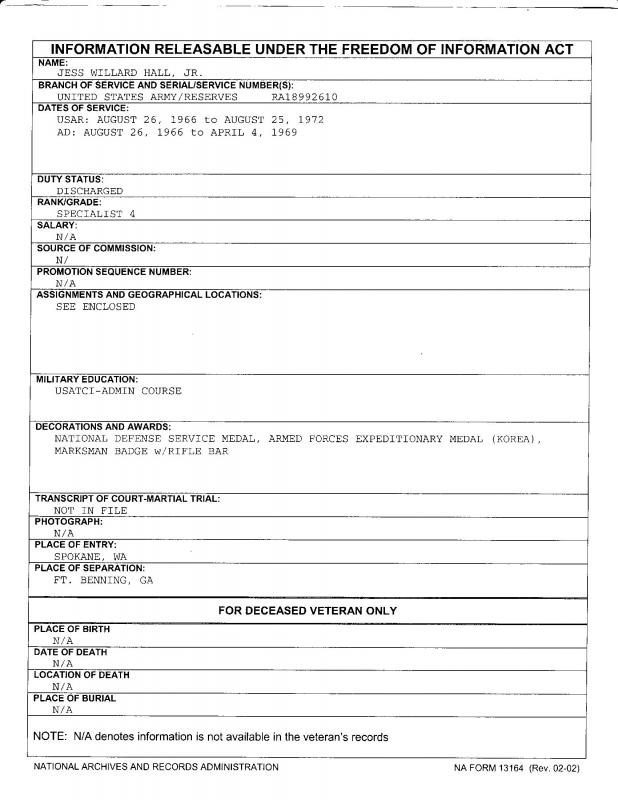
Skip Hall Records 1

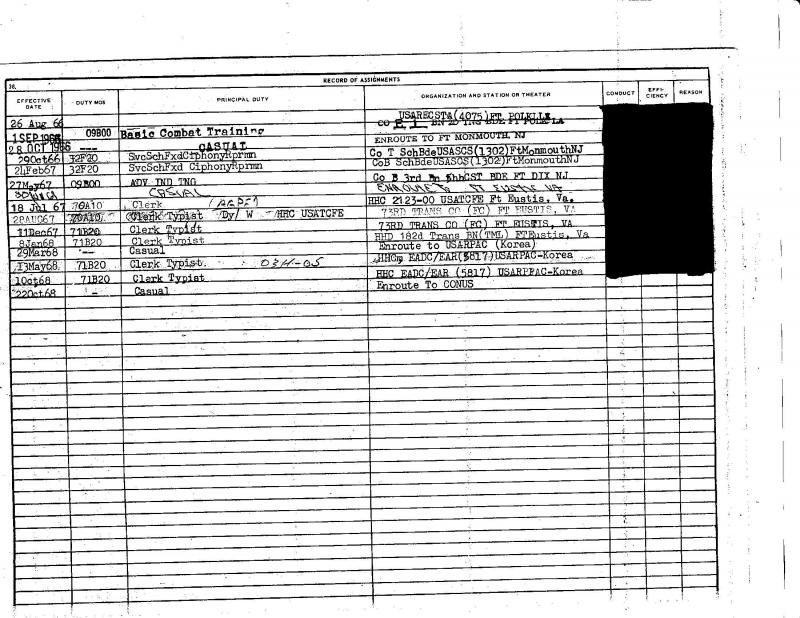
Skip Hall Records 2

=== Mixed martial arts record ===
Professional record breakdown
8 matches	2 wins	5 losses
By knockout	0	2
By submission	2	3
No contests	1	

Res.	Record	Opponent	Method	Event	Date	Round	Time	Location	Notes
NC	2–5 (1)	Kelly Rundle	No Contest		March 24, 2008	1	N/A	Alabama, United States	Originally a TKO loss, the result was changed to a "no contest" after Hall claimed to have been poked in the eye.
Loss	2–5	Dan Severn	Submission (choke)	Jasper City Slugfest	August 26, 2006	1	N/A	Alabama, United States	
Win	2–4	Chuck Costello	Submission (rear naked choke)	Worldwide Fighting Championship - Rumble in the Rockies	January 21, 2006	1	2:14	Loveland, Colorado, United States	
Loss	1–4	Anthony Barbier	TKO (punches)	Reality Combat Fighting - Duel in the Delta	September 25, 2004	1	1:25	Runica, Mississippi, United States	
Loss	1–3	Graeme Hussey	Submission (guillotine choke)	Pride and Glory 2 - Battle of the Ages	April 10, 2004	1	N/A	Eldon Square, England	
Win	1–2	James Wakefield	Submission (guillotine choke)	International Cage Brawl	August 13, 2003	1	N/A	Birmingham, Alabama, United States	
Loss	0–2	Bob Ostovich	Submission (choke)	Underground Fight Club 8	February 22, 2003	1	2:10	Alabama, United States	
Loss	0–1	Michael Buchkovich	TKO (corner stoppage)	Reality Superfighting 4 - Circle of Truth	September 22, 2001	1	1:46	Savannah, Georgia, United States	
