= NWA Fusion Tag Team Championship =

The NWA Fusion Tag Team Championship are the tag team titles of the Virginia territory of the National Wrestling Alliance.

The titles were formed in the WWC promotion in 1994 when Thunderstorm (Jimmy Jack Thunder & Matt Storm) defeated Carjacker and Cat Burglar in a tournament final. The title has stayed with the promotion throughout its various name changes and NWA membership being known as the WWC, APWA, RCW (Richmond Championship Wrestling), and NWA New York (State) Tag Team Championship before the promotion finally relocated to the Commonwealth of Virginia and became known as NWA Virginia. NWA Virginia was renamed NWA Fusion in mid-2008.

== Title history ==
Wrestlers	Times	Date	Place	Notes
WWC Tag Team Championship
Thunderstorm (Jimmy Jack Thunder & Matt Storm)	1	June 1994	Barnegat, NJ	Defeated Carjacker and Cat Burglar in a tournament final to be crowned first champions
Lover's Express (Overweight Lover & Eric Idol)	1	May 1995	Bayville, NJ	Bouncer was subbing for injured Jimmy Jack Thunder in the match
Renamed APWA Tag Team Championship
Thunderstorm	2	August 1996	Manhawkin, NJ	
Honor Roll (Slayer & Tommy Logan)	1	December 1996	Manhawkin, NJ	
Thunderstorm	3	May 1997	Bayville, NJ	
Extremists (Ace Darling & Devon Storm)	1	August 10, 1997	Staten Island, NY	
Renamed RCW Tag Team Championship
Vacated on March 7, 1998 when the Extremists were stripped due to their NWA-CWA commitments.
Renamed NWA New York Tag Team Championship
Mr. Motion and Jeff Grant	1	March 17, 1998	Staten Island, NY	Defeat Sir Christopher Michaels & American Superstar in a tournament final.
Guillotine LeGrande & Kamikaze Kid	1	June 12, 1999	Staten Island, NY	
Soul Brothers (Elvin & Jack Soul)	1	November 27, 1999	Staten Island, NY	The Intruder subbed for the injured Kamikaze Kid in the match.
Vacated on January 29, 2000 when the Soul Brothers no-showed a title defense.
Big Unit (Rick Silver & Dave Desire)	1	January 29, 2000	Staten Island, NY	Won vacant titles in a 13-man battle royal. The final two remaining wrestlers were crowned the champions
Soul Brothers	2	January 29, 2000	Queens, NY	
Vacated in 2000 when the promotion moved to Virginia.
Renamed NWA Virginia Tag Team Championship on October 13, 2001.
The Untouchables (Sean Lei and Kory James)	1	September 21, 2002	Richmond, VA	Defeated Greg Steel and Idol X to determine the first champions.
Vacated on July 18, 2003 when the titles were stripped from The Untouchables due to Sean Lei's back injury.
Old School Empire (Damien Wayne & Mike Booth)	1	July 18, 2003	Richmond, VA (Blackwell Community Ctr)	Defeated The Owens Bros. (Jay and Trey) and The Premiere Players (Dash Bennett and "The Ace" Ryan Spade) for the vacant titles.
Scotty Blaze & Frank Parker	1	November 13, 2004	Richmond, VA (Powhatan Hill Recreation Ctr)	Preston Quinn & Malicious Murphy stood in for the other Old School Empire members.
Preston Quinn & Mike Booth (2)	1	April 23, 2005	Richmond, VA	Pharaoh filled in for the missing Frank Parker.
Phil Brown & Dirty Money	1	March 25, 2006	Saluda, VA	
Vacated on 11/18/06 - Dirty Money going to OVW, Phil Brown also leaves NWA Virginia
Totally Awesome (Kamikaze Kid & El Sucio)	1	February 3, 2007	Saluda, VA	Defeated Fusion GX, Mike Vaughn & Chris Dramin and HorrorShow & 6D6 to win the vacant titles in a four corners elimination match. This Kamikaze Kid is not the same wrestler as the one who held this title in 1999.
Renamed NWA Fusion Tag Team Championship on October 1, 2008. Titles vacated at that time.
Da Nu Bloods (Da Curse & Da Gift)	2	February 21, 2009	Saluda, VA	Defeated Assault & Battery in the tournament finals
Assault and Battery ("Diamond" Victor Griff and Carlos Hotness)	1	October 17, 2009	Mattaponi, VA	
Preston Quinn and Grail	2	February 27, 2010	Saluda, VA	
The Geordie Bulldogs (Sean Denny and Marky D)	1	October 16, 2010	King and Queen, VA	4-way elimination match for the titles where The Bulldogs outlasted Da Nu Bloods, A-1, and Preston Quinn/Larry Horsley (Horsley changed his ring name from "Grail" during the title reign).
A-1 ("Number One" Jefferson Early and "The A-Lister" Zak Hilton)	1	January 15, 2011	King and Queen, VA	A-1 was able to pick up the victory after Marky D knocked Sean Denny out, effectively turning heel.
Stephon Smith & Larry McHale	1	July 16, 2011	King And Queen, VA	If A-1 won, Larry Horsley and Preston Quinn had to retire.
A-1 ("Number One" Jefferson Early and "The A-Lister" Zak Hilton)	2	December 10, 2011	King and Queen, VA	
The titles were vacated on May 19, 2012, due to A-1 not showing up at the shows 3 months.
Brandon Day & "Everything Is Better With" Aden Chambers	1	August 18, 2012	King and Queen, VA	Brandon Day and Aden Chambers beat A-1 in the finals of the Tag Team Championship tournament for the vacant championship.
Brandon Day & Ryan Zane	1	September 2013	Awarded	Day chooses Zane as his tag team partner following Aden Chambers' retirement on August 17, 2013.
