= Harley Lewis =

American professional wrestler

Personal information
- Born: May 5, 1974 (age 52)

Professional wrestling career
- Ring name: Harley Lewis
- Billed height: 6 ft 3 in (1.91 m)
- Billed weight: 275 lb (125 kg)
- Billed from: Philadelphia, Pennsylvania, United States
- Trained by: Tom Brandi
- Debut: 1994

Harley Lewis (born May 5, 1974) is an American professional wrestler and shoot fighter who competes for independent promotions in the United States, Canada, Puerto Rico and Japan. He has had successful stints in the United States Wrestling Association, International World Class Championship Wrestling, the National Wrestling Alliance, Phoenix Championship Wrestling, Mid-Eastern Wrestling Federation, and the World Wide Wrestling Alliance. During the 1990s, he was a member of The Mistfits with Derek Domino and Lupus and held several tag team titles with them in various NWA-affiliated promotions and elsewhere on the independent circuit.

Lewis has also competed internationally wrestling in Big Japan Pro Wrestling and the World Wrestling Council holding the WWC Puerto Rico Heavyweight Championship in late 1999. He is also the longest reigning holder of the PCW Heavyweight Championship holding the title for 14-months before losing to The Wall in 2003.

Among his appearances include the NWA's 50th Anniversary Show in 1998 as well as a regular competitor at the Eddie Gilbert Memorial Brawl between 1996 and 1999.

== Championships and accomplishments ==
- American Wrestling Council
  - AWC Tag Team Championship (1 time, inaugural) - with Derek Domino
- IWA Hardcore
  - IWA Hardcore Tag Team Championship (1 time) - with Lupus
- Mid-Eastern Wrestling Federation
  - MEWF Tag Team Championship (1 time) - with Derek Domino
- National Wrestling Alliance
  - NWA United States Tag Team Championship (4 times) - with Derek Domino
  - NWA World Six-Man Tag Team Championship (1 time, inaugural) - with Derek Domino and Lupus
- NWA 2000
  - NWA 2000 Tag Team Championship (1 time) - with Lupus
- New Jack City Wrestling
  - NJC Heavyweight Championship (1 time)
  - NJC Tag Team Championship (3 times) - with Psychotron
- Phoenix Championship Wrestling
  - PCW Heavyweight Championship (1 time)
- World Wrestling Alliance
  - WWA Intercontinental Championship (2 times)
- World Wrestling Council
  - WWC Puerto Rico Heavyweight Championship (1 time)
- Pro Wrestling Illustrated
  - PWI ranked him # 348 of the 500 best singles wrestlers of the PWI 500 in 2000
