= NWA Anniversary Show =

Professional wrestling event

- Promotions: National Wrestling Alliance
- First event: NWA 50th Anniversary Show

The NWA Anniversary Show is a professional wrestling event held by the National Wrestling Alliance (NWA). The first event was held in 1998 to celebrate the 50th anniversary of the 1948 founding of the NWA. The event then continued to be held annually until 2005. It has since been held periodically, with shows held in 2008, 2018, 2021, and the most recent in 2024.

== Events and Results ==
=== NWA 50th Anniversary Show ===
NWA 50th Anniversary Show
- Promotion: National Wrestling Alliance
- Date: October 24, 1998
- City: Cherry Hill, New Jersey
- Venue: Hilton Hotel
- Attendance: 500

NWA Anniversary Show chronology
← Previous; First	Next → 51st

The NWA 50th Anniversary Show took place on October 24, 1998 at the Hilton Hotel in Cherry Hill, New Jersey.

No.	Results	Stipulations
1	The International Males (Christopher Daniels and Kevin Quinn) defeated The Hollywood Hardbodies (Danny Dominion and Ace Steel)	Tag team match for the vacant NWA Midwest Tag Team Championship
2	Primo Carnera III and TNT defeated Lord Zeig and Patch	Tag team match
3	EZ Ryder defeated Paul Atlas	Singles match for the newly created NWA Canadian Heavyweight Champion
4	Tre (c) (with Tony Rumble) vs. The Inferno Kid vs. Ray Odyssey ended in a double countout	Three-way match for the NWA New England Cruiserweight Championship
5	Steve Williams won a battle royal defeating Kurt Angle, Babu, Steve Corino, Christopher Daniels, Teddy Hart, Barry Houston, Glenn Kulka, Andrew Martin, Tom Prichard, Giant Silva, Tiger Ali Singh, Shawn Stasiak and Devon Storm.	14-man WWF Dojo Battle Royal
6	Abdullah the Butcher defeated T. Rantula	Singles match
7	The Headbangers (Mosh and Thrasher) defeated The Tennessee Volunteers (Steven Dunn and Reno Riggins) (c) by disqualification.	Tag team match for the NWA North American Tag Team Championship
8	The Extreme (Ace Darling and Devon Storm) defeated The Misfits (Harley Lewis and Lupus) (c)	Tag team match for the NWA 2000 Tag Team Championship
9	The Brotherhood (Knuckles Nelson and Eric Sbraccia) defeated The Border Patrol (Agent Carson & Agent Gunn) (c), Team Extreme (Kit Carson and Khris Germany) and Tully Blanchard and Tom Prichard	Four Corners match for the NWA World Tag Team Championship
10	Dan Severn (c) defeated Steven Regal	Singles match for the NWA World Heavyweight Championship
11	Steve Corino, Lance Diamond, Doug Gilbert and Rik Ratchett defeated Dead Man Walking, The Pitbulls (#1 and #2) and Stevie Richards (c)	Steel Cage match for the NWA National Heavyweight Championship
(c) / – the champion(s) heading into the match

=== NWA 51st Anniversary Show ===
NWA 51st Anniversary Show: Battle of the Belts 1999
- Promotion: National Wrestling Alliance
- Date: September 25, 1999
- City: Charlotte, North Carolina
- Venue: Grady Cole Center
- Attendance: 700

NWA Anniversary Show chronology
← Previous; 50th	Next → 52nd

The NWA 51st Anniversary Show, subtitled "Battle of the Belts 1999", after a regular event from former NWA territory Championship Wrestling from Florida, took place on September 25, 1999 at the Grady Cole Center in Charlotte, North Carolina.

No.	Results	Stipulations
1	Triple xXx (Drake Dawson and Curtis Thompson) defeated The Sex Pistols (Shane Austin and David Young).	NWA World Tag Team Championship #1 contender's tournament
2	Team Extreme (Kit Carson and Khris Germany) defeated Gene Austin and Tommy Starr.	NWA World Tag Team Championship #1 contender's tournament
3	The Canadian Cartel (Crusher Carlsen and Michelle Starr) vs. The Rage (Quinn Magnum and Samu) ended in a no-contest	NWA World Tag Team Championship #1 contender's tournament
4	EZ Ryder defeated Sebastian P. Sterling	Singles match for the Queen's Cup
5	Team Extreme (Kit Carson and Khris Germany) defeated Triple xXx (Drake Dawson and Curtis Thompson).	NWA World Tag Team Championship #1 contender's tournament
6	Gary Steele defeated Brian Anthony and Naoya Ogawa (c)	Three-Way Dance for the NWA World Heavyweight Championship
7	Abdullah the Butcher vs. Don Brodie ended in a no-contest	Singles match
8	Twiggy Ramirez defeated Danny Dominion, Chris Hero, Vince Kaplack, Tony Kozina, Mercury, Chris Michaels, Johnny Moss, Air Paris, Buck Quartermain and Gary Royal	11-man battle royal for a NWA World Junior Heavyweight Championship match
9	Logan Caine (c) defeated Twiggy Ramirez	Singles match for the NWA World Junior Heavyweight Championship
10	Ron Garvin defeated Stan Lane	Singles match
11	Team Extreme (Kit Carson and Khris Germany) defeated The Brotherhood (Dukes Dalton and Knuckles Nelson) (c)	Tag team match for the NWA World Tag Team Championship
(c) / – the champion(s) heading into the match

=== NWA 52nd Anniversary Show ===
NWA 52nd Anniversary Show: Battle of the Belts 2000 / Showcase of the Stars
- Promotion: National Wrestling Alliance
- Date: October 14-15, 2000
- City: Nashville, Tennessee
- Venue: Tennessee State Fairgrounds Arena
- Attendance: 500 (night one); 200 (night two)

NWA Anniversary Show chronology
← Previous; 51st	Next → 53rd

The NWA 52nd Anniversary Show, took place over two events, subtitled "Battle of the Belts 2000" and "Showcase of the Stars", on October 14 and 15 2000 at the Tennessee State Fairgrounds Arena in Nashville, Tennessee. In the ninth match on night two Brandon K substituted for J.B. Destiny, who was unable to appear due to travel problems.

Night one

No.	Results	Stipulations
1	Lazz defeated A.J. Styles	Singles match
2	Chris Champion defeated Slash	Singles match
3	Damaja and Nick Dinsmore defeated Rob Conway and Flash Flanagan	Tag team match
4	James Storm defeated Big Bully Douglas	Singles match
5	Strawberry Fields defeated Leilani Kai	Singles match for the vacant NWA World Women's Championship
6	Vince Kaplack defeated Tony Kozina (c)	Singles match for the NWA World Junior Heavyweight Championship
7	Bad Attitude (Rick Michaels and David Young) (c) defeated The Hotshots (Cassidy O'Reilly and Air Paris)	Tag team match for the NWA World Tag Team Championship
8	Mike Rapada (c) defeated Chris Harris	Singles match for the NWA World Heavyweight Championship
(c) / – the champion(s) heading into the match

Night two

No.	Results	Stipulations
1	Blade Boudreaux defeated Bulldog Raines (c)	Singles match for the NWA Mid-South Heavyweight Championship
2	Johnny Moss defeated Jon Ryan	Singles match
3	Magic (c) defeated Biggie Biggs, Eric Kreed and Zieg	Fatal Four-Way match for the NWA New York Heavyweight Championship
4	N8 Mattson defeated Ricco Rodriguez (c)	Singles match for the NWA Great Lakes Junior Heavyweight Championship
5	Mr. Attitude and Bobby Inbred defeated Johnny Hard and Viper	Tag team match
6	Mr. Mayhem defeated Necro Butcher	Hardcore match
7	The Maniacal Crew (Brother Love and Joey Venture) defeated The New Texas Outlaws (Ricky Murdock and Austin Rhodes) (c)	Tag team match for the NWA Southern Tag Team Championship
8	Dave Mysterio and X-Factor defeated Touch of Reality (Jim the Messenger and Bob Steele).	Tag team match
9	Jimmy Angel and Paul Atlas defeated Brandon K and Big Poppa Gator (c)	Tag team match for the NWA East Tag Team Championship
10	Jason Rumble defeated Beau Douglas (c)	Singles match for the NWA New England Heavyweight Championship
(c) / – the champion(s) heading into the match

=== NWA 53rd Anniversary Show ===
NWA 53rd Anniversary Show: Battle of the Belts 2001
- Promotion: National Wrestling Alliance
- Date: October 13, 2001
- City: St. Petersburg, Florida
- Venue: WrestlePlex
- Attendance: 400

NWA Anniversary Show chronology
← Previous; 52nd	Next → 54th

The NWA 53rd Anniversary Show, subtitled "Battle of the Belts 2001", took place on October 13, 2001 at the WrestlePlex in St. Petersburg, Florida.

No.	Results	Stipulations
1	Jacey North defeated Biggie Biggs (c)	Singles match for the NWA Virginia Heavyweight Championship
2	Gene Austin and Brimstone defeated The Chunk-n-Dales (Chunk and Dale).	Tag team match
3	Rocky Reynolds defeated Star (c)	Singles match for the NWA Tri-State Heavyweight Championship
4	Sudden Impact (Chris Gatlin and Steve Lane) defeated Disturbing Behavior (Jeff Daniels and Tim Renesto) (with Dominique) (c)	Tag team match for the NWA Mid-America Tag Team Championship
5	Pepe Prado defeated The Cuban Assassin (with Fantasy).	Singles match
6	Ricky Murdock (c) defeated Blade Boudreaux	Singles match for the NWA Mid-South Heavyweight Championship
7	Gary Steele and Paul Vault defeated Danny Garnell and Johnny Moss.	Tag team match
8	Naohiro Hoshikawa defeated Dagon Briggs	Singles match
9	EZ Ryder defeated Juggernaut	Singles match for the vacant NWA Canadian Heavyweight Championship
10	Hotstuff Hernandez defeated Kevin Northcutt (c)	Singles match for the NWA National Heavyweight Championship
11	Quinn Magnum defeated Spyder (c)	Singles match for the NWA North American Heavyweight Championship
12	Cyborg defeated Buck Q (c)	Singles match for the NWA Florida Heavyweight Championship
13	A.J. Styles (with Jeff G. Bailey) defeated Christopher Daniels	Singles match
14	The New Heavenly Bodies (Vito DeNucci and Chris Nelson) (c) defeated Total Destruction (Rusty Riddle and Sean Royal)	Tag team match for the NWA World Tag Team Championship
15	Jason Rumble defeated Brandon K, Lex Lovett (c), Jimmy Rave and BJ Turner	Five-Way match for the NWA World Junior Heavyweight Championship
16	Steve Corino (c) vs. Shinya Hashimoto ended in a no-contest	Singles match for the NWA World Heavyweight Championship
17	Team IPW (Scoot Andrews, Jet Jaguar, The Shane Twins (Mike and Todd) and Mike Sullivan) (with promoter Ron Niemi) vs. Team NWA Florida (Lex Lovett, The New Heavenly Bodies (Vito DeNucci and Chris Nelson), Buck Q and Rod Steel) (with promoter Howard Brody) ended in a no-contest	10-man tag team match
(c) / – the champion(s) heading into the match

=== NWA 54th Anniversary Show ===
NWA 54th Anniversary Show: Battle of the Belts 2002
- Promotion: National Wrestling Alliance
- Date: October 26, 2002
- City: Corpus Christi, Texas
- Venue: Memorial Coliseum
- Attendance: 250

NWA Anniversary Show chronology
← Previous; 53rd	Next → 55th

The NWA 54th Anniversary Show, subtitled "Battle of the Belts 2002", took place on October 26, 2002 at the Memorial Coliseum in Corpus Christi, Texas.

No.	Results	Stipulations
1	Jacey North defeated Brother Love.	Singles match
2	Ryan Pisiak defeated Dagon Briggs	Hair vs. Hair match
3	The East Coast Connection (Sick Dog and Joe Wolfen) defeated Ricky Murdock and Magnum	Tag team match
4	Spyder (c) defeated Paul Tracey	Singles match for the NWA Canadian Heavyweight Championship
5	Biggie Biggs (c) defeated Preston Quinn	Singles match for the NWA Jersey Heavyweight Championship
6	Jason Rumble (c) defeated Rocky Reynolds	Singles match for the NWA New England Junior Heavyweight Championship
7	Steve DeMarco defeated J.P. Black (c)	Texas Death match for the NWA Texas Heavyweight Championship
8	Johnny Moss (c) defeated Danny Garnell	Singles match for the NWA United Kingdom Heavyweight Championship
9	Char Starr defeated Madison (c)	Singles match for the NWA World Women's Championship
10	Jorge Estrada defeated Paul Atlas (c)	Singles match for the NWA North American Heavyweight Championship
11	Konnan defeated Danny Dominion	Singles match
12	America's Most Wanted (Chris Harris and James Storm) (c) defeated Rocky Reynolds and A.J. Styles	Tag team match for the NWA World Tag Team Championship
13	Ron Killings (c) defeated Hotstuff Hernandez	Singles match for the NWA World Heavyweight Championship
(c) / – the champion(s) heading into the match

=== NWA 55th Anniversary Show ===
NWA 55th Anniversary Show
- Promotion: National Wrestling Alliance
- Date: October 10-11, 2003
- City: Parkersburg, West Virginia
- Venue: Park Pavilion
- Attendance: 300 (night one); 325 (night two)

NWA Anniversary Show chronology
← Previous; 54th	Next → 56th

The NWA 55th Anniversary Show, took place over two events on October 10 and 11 2003 at the Park Pavilion in Parkersburg, West Virginia.

Night one

No.	Results	Stipulations
1	Kevin Rhodes defeated C.B. Kool (c)	Singles match for the NWA Florida Junior Heavyweight Championship
2	Bruce Banner defeated Romeo Godwinn	Singles match
3	Bobby Jay and Vinnie Viagra defeated Zach Mercury and Rob Stardom	Tag team match
4	The Hawaiian Power Company (Kapu and Tiki) (c) defeated Chris Cavanaugh and Cholo	Tag team match for the NWA Hawaii Tag Team Championship
5	Spyder defeated Fergal Devitt	Singles match for the vacant NWA British Commonwealth Heavyweight Champion
6	Paul Tracey defeated Muscles Mansfield	Singles match
7	Ricky Murdock (c - national) defeated Shane Somers (c - Missouri)	NWA National Heavyweight Championship vs. NWA Missouri Heavyweight Championship match
8	Chance Prophet (c) defeated Trik Nasty	Singles match for the NWA Bluegrass Heavyweight Championship
9	Sinn (with Traci Brooks) defeated Mason Hunter	Singles match
(c) / – the champion(s) heading into the match

Night two

No.	Results	Stipulations
1	Kid Inferno and Twisted Youth defeated DJ Skittlez and Clark	Tag team match
2	Roderick Strong (c) defeated Jerrelle Clark and Danny Doring	Triple Threat match for the NWA Florida X Division Championship
3	JT Wolfen (c) defeated Chance Prophet	Singles match for the NWA North American Heavyweight Championship
4	Leilani Kai (c) defeated AJ Sparx	Singles match for the NWA World Women's Championship
5	America's Most Wanted (Chris Harris and James Storm) defeated The Naturals (Andy Douglas and Chase Stevens)	Tag team match
6	Chris Draven (c) vs. Double Dragon vs. Rocky Reynolds vs. Vinnie Viagra ended in a no-contest	Fatal Four-Way Ladder match for the NWA World Junior Heavyweight Championship
7	Trik Nasty won	Battle Royal
(c) / – the champion(s) heading into the match

=== NWA 56th Anniversary Show ===
NWA 56th Anniversary Show
- Promotion: National Wrestling Alliance
- Date: October 15, 2004; October 17, 2004
- City: Winnipeg, Manitoba, Canada
- Venue: Ramada Malbourough Hotel
- Attendance: 100 (night two)

NWA Anniversary Show chronology
← Previous; 55th	Next → 57th

The NWA 56th Anniversary Show took place over two events on October 15 and 17 2004 at the Ramada Malbourough Hotel in Winnipeg, Manitoba, Canada.

Night one

No.	Results	Stipulations
1	Tejas (c) defeated Dustin Masters	Singles match for the NWA Texas Heavyweight Championship
2	Shane Matthews defeated Keith Loughman	Singles match
3	The Trailer Park Boyz (Dave Drako and Matt Korn) defeated Gino Martino and Larry Huntley by disqualification	Tag team match
4	Johnny Moss defeated Byron Black	Singles match
5	Team Ireland (Fergal Devitt and Paul Tracey) defeated Paddy Morrow and Carl O'Rourke	Tag team match
6	Conscience (c) defeated L.A. Warren	Singles match for the NWA Scottish Heavyweight Championship
7	Dru Onyx defeated Will Phoenix	Singles match for the vacant NWA British Commonwealth Heavyweight Championship
8	Steve Jaworski won	15-man battle royal for the vacant CWF Heavyweight Championship
9	Vid Vain defeated Kerry Brown (c)	Singles match for the NWA Canadian Heavyweight Championship
10	Spyder defeated Ricky Murdock (c)	Singles match for the NWA National Heavyweight Championship
(c) / – the champion(s) heading into the match

Night two

No.	Results	Stipulations
1	Chasyn Rance defeated Mark Stephens	Singles match for the vacant NWA Spinebuster Junior Heavyweight Championship
2	Steve Jaworski (c) defeated Tank Roberts	Singles match for the CWF Heavyweight Championship
3	Will Phoenix defeated Shane Matthews	Singles match
4	Conscience, Paddy Morrow and Carl O'Rourke defeated Byron Black, Fergal Devitt and Paul Tracey	Six-man tag team match
5	Gino Martino (c) defeated Dave Drako	Singles match for the NWA New England Brass Knuckles Championship
6	Shane Dyson and Roadblock Jones defeated Keith Laughman and L.A. Warren	Tag team match
7	Jason Rumble defeated Jerrelle Clark (c) and Vance Desmond	Three-Way Dance for the NWA World Junior Heavyweight Championship
8	Petey Williams (c) defeated Kenny Omega	Singles match for the TNA X Division Championship
(c) / – the champion(s) heading into the match

=== NWA 57th Anniversary Show ===
NWA 57th Anniversary Show
- Promotion: National Wrestling Alliance
- Date: October 8, 2005
- City: Nashville, Tennessee
- Venue: Tennessee State Fairgrounds Arena
- Attendance: 500-700

NWA Anniversary Show chronology
← Previous; 56th	Next → 60th

The NWA 57th Anniversary Show took place on October 8, 2005 at the Tennessee State Fairgrounds Arena in Nashville, Tennessee.

No.	Results	Stipulations
1	Three Guys That Totally Rule (Patrick Bentley and Seth Delay) defeated Adam Roberts and Gabriel (with Jeff G. Bailey)	Six-man tag team match
2	Vance Desmond defeated Zac Vincent (c)	Singles match for the NWA Tri-State X Division Championship
3	The Syndicate Crew (L.A. Player and Superfly P) (with YT) defeated The Amazing Pookie and Cousin Cooter	Tag team match
4	Scotty Blaze defeated Brandon Day (c)	Singles match for the NWA Virginia Heavyweight Championship
5	Komei defeated Alex Koslov	Singles match
6	Abyss (with Tim Welch) vs. Chris Michaels ended in a no-contest	Singles match
7	The Twin Terrors (Koko and Razz Mansour) (c) defeated LuFisto and Tank	Tag team match for the NWA Canadian Tag Team Championship
8	Paddy Morrow (c) defeated Paul Tracey	Singles match for the NWA Ireland Heavyweight Championship and the NWA United Kingdom Heavyweight Championship
9	Jason Rumble (with Quentin Michaels) defeated Mark Moment	Singles match
10	The Psycho (c) defeated Rick Morgan	Singles match for the NWA Battle Zone Cruiserweight Championship
11	Fergal Devitt defeated Dru Onyx (c)	Singles match for the NWA British Commonwealth Heavyweight Championship
12	The Blackbirds (Ice and Jazz) defeated The Bounty Hunters (Big Nasty Bill and Ricky Murdock)	Tag team match
13	Vinnie Viagra (c) defeated Chance Prophet	Singles match for the NWA Bluegrass Heavyweight Championship
14	Jeff Daniels and Mike Woods (with Dominique) defeated The Old School Players (Apollo and Dynamite Derrick)	Tag team match for the vacant NWA Mid-America Tag Team Championship
15	Scottie Gash (c) defeated Nikita Allanov and Chris Taylor	Triple Threat match for the NWA East Heavyweight Championship
16	Tommy Marr defeated JT Wolfen (c) (with Dave Heart)	Singles match for the NWA North American Heavyweight Championship
17	Ricky Murdock defeated Conscience and The Juggulator	Triple Threat match for the vacant NWA National Heavyweight Championship
18	Chris Escobar and Shane Falco defeated Daron Smythe and Tim Warcloud (c)	Tag team match for the NWA North American Tag Team Championship
19	Christie Ricci defeated Lexie Fyfe (c) and Tasha Simone	Triple Threat match for the NWA World Women's Championship
20	The Naturals (Andy Douglas and Chase Stevens) defeated Cassidy Riley and Eric Young	Nashville Street Fight for the vacant NWA World Tag Team Championship
(c) / – the champion(s) heading into the match

=== NWA 60th Anniversary Show ===
NWA 60th Anniversary Show
- Promotion: National Wrestling Alliance
- Date: June 7, 2008
- City: Atlanta, Georgia
- Venue: Philips Arena
- Attendance: 2,500

NWA Anniversary Show chronology
← Previous; 57th	Next → 70th

The NWA 60th Anniversary Show took place on June 7, 2008 at Philips Arena, now known as State Farm Arena, in Atlanta. Although it was the best-attended of all the Anniversary Show events, arena officials believed the crowd to be the smallest that the 18,000-seat venue had ever seen.

No.	Results	Stipulations
1	Mike DiBiase (c) defeated Aaron Stevens	Singles match for the NWA North American Heavyweight Championship
2	Iceberg (c) (with Dan Wilson) defeated Mikael Judas and Shatter (with Jeff G. Bailey)	Triple Threat match for the NWA Anarchy Heavyweight Championship
3	Abdullah the Butcher (with John Cheatum) vs. Tommy Rich ended in a no-contest	Singles match
4	Blue Demon Jr. and Sean Waltman defeated Rob Conway and Carl Ouellet	Tag team match
5	Mike Quackenbush (c) defeated Ricky Vega	Singles match for the NWA World Junior Heavyweight Championship
6	Los Luchas (Phoenix Star and Zokre) (c) defeated The Naturals (Andy Douglas and Chase Stevens) and The Real American Heroes (Karl Anderson and Joey Ryan with C. Edward Vander Pyle)	Triple Threat elimination match for the NWA World Tag Team Championship
7	Sid Vicious defeated The Playas Club (Justin Corino and Dave Greco)	Handicap match
8	The Rock 'n' Roll Express (Robert Gibson and Ricky Morton) defeated The Midnight Express (Dennis Condrey and Bobby Eaton) (with Jim Cornette)	Tag team match
(c) / – the champion(s) heading into the match

== Sources ==
- Tim Hornbaker (2007). National Wrestling Alliance: The Untold Story of the Monopoly that Strangled Pro Wrestling. ECW Press. ISBN 978-1-55022-741-3.
- Shaun Assael and Mike Mooneyham (2002). Sex, Lies, and Headlocks: The Real Story of Vince McMahon and World Wrestling Entertainment. Crown. ISBN 1-4000-5143-6.
