= NWA British Commonwealth Heavyweight Championship =

Professional wrestling championship

Details
- Promotion: NWA UK Hammerlock; Torture Chamber Pro Wrestling
- Date established: October 11, 2003
- Current champion: Wilson Colas
- Date won: May 5, 2024
Statistics
- First champion: Spyder
- Most reigns: Dru Onyx (5 times)
- Longest reign: Dru Onyx (825 days)
- Shortest reign: Paul Tracey (<1 day)
- Youngest champion: Justin White

The NWA British Commonwealth Heavyweight Championship is a professional wrestling championship that formerly served as the major title in the NWA UK Hammerlock promotion. The title is currently owned by Torture Chamber Pro Wrestling Dojo along with the NWA Canadian Tag Team Championship.

== History ==
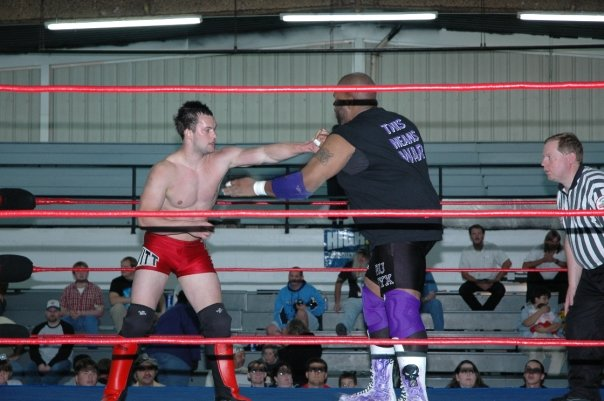
Prince Devitt challenging for the championship against Dru Onyx.

Originally conceived as the brainchild of NWA UK Hammerlock promoter Andre Baker and Canadian Wrestling Federation promoter (and former NWA president) Ernie Todd, the title was created to have a non Board-controlled title that can be defended and promoted across continents, and also build positive working relationships between promoters, exchange talent and enhance the NWA product worldwide.

The NWA-affiliated promotions the title is defended in are NWA UK Hammerlock, NWA Ireland, NWA Quebec, Elite Canadian Championship Wrestling and NWA Pro. NWA Pro was included in 2006 due to having affiliate promotions in Australia. In the last thirteen years, the title has been defended or promoted in England, Wales, Ireland, Canada, the United States, Spain, the Netherlands, France and Barbados.

There are two criteria for the selection of champions: they have to be credible wrestlers with presence and have to be in a position to be able to travel and defend the title in both NWA and non-NWA promotions.

The title belt shows the flags of various nations, some currently members of the Commonwealth of Nations and some that are former members. The belt features the flags of the countries of the United Kingdom (displayed prominently on the center plate), Australia, Barbados, Canada, India, Jamaica, New Zealand, Singapore, and South Africa.

== Reigns ==
No.	Order in reign history
Reign	The reign number for the specific set of wrestlers listed
Event	The event in which the title was won
—	Used for vacated reigns so as not to count it as an official reign
N/A	The information is not available or is unknown
+	Indicates the current reign is changing daily

No.	Wrestler	Reign	Date	Days held	Location	Event	Notes
1	Spyder	1	October 10, 2003	357	Parkersburg, WV	NWA 55th Anniversary Show – Day 1	Defeats Fergal Devitt on the first night of the NWA 55th Anniversary Show to become the first champion. The NWA Board does not allow Spyder to defend the championship due to a controversial finish being under review and also due to outcry from NWA UK Hammerlock.
—	Vacated	—	October 1, 2004	—	N/A	N/A	Stripped by the NWA Board due to the above controversy.
2	Dru Onyx	1	October 15, 2004	12	Winnipeg, Manitoba, Canada	NWA 56th Anniversary Show – Day 1	Defeated Will Phoenix for the vacated title.
3	Fergal Devitt	1	October 27, 2004	3	Cardiff, Wales	Live Event	Fergal Devitt was the first junior heavyweight to win the title.
4	Dru Onyx	2	October 30, 2004	343	Ashford, Kent, England	Live Event	Defeated Fergal Devitt and Paul Tracey in a handicap match, with Onyx' NWA United Kingdom Heavyweight Championship also on the line.
5	Fergal Devitt	2	October 8, 2005	155	Nashville, TN	NWA 57th Anniversary Show	
6	Karl Anderson	1	March 12, 2006	91	Santa Monica, CA	Live Event	
7	Alex Koslov	1	June 11, 2006	28	Santa Monica, CA	Live Event	This was a 3-Way Match, also involving Mikey Nicholls.
8	Justin White	1	July 9, 2006	49	Santa Monica, CA	Live Event	Dru Onyx trained Justin White, thus giving the championship the distinction of having the first trainer and student to win the title.
9	Paul Tracey	1	August 27, 2006	426	Bray, Wicklow, Ireland	Live Event	
10	Dru Onyx	3	October 27, 2007	819	St. Albans, VT	Live Event	
11	Adam Pearce	1	January 23, 2010	50	Quebec City, Quebec, Canada	NSPW Steen vs. War Cloud	Pearce defeated Onyx using a steel chain.
12	Dru Onyx	4	March 14, 2010	1,024 – 1,330	N/A	N/A	Awarded back to Onyx after Pearce wins the World Heavyweight Title on March 14, 2010; the January 23, 2010 match is also reviewed due to the use of an illegal object by Pearce and Onyx.
—	Vacated	—	2013	—	N/A	N/A	
13	Pat Guénette	1	November 3, 2013	692	Laval, Quebec, Canada	Torture Chamber: A Day To Remember	Defeats Jake Matthews for the vacated title.
14	Paul Tracey	2	September 26, 2015	0	Montreal, Quebec, Canada	Torture Chamber: Straight Outta Chamber	Tracey won the match after hitting a facebuster on a Chair. After winning the championship, Tracey issued an open challenge.
15	Stew Korvus	1	September 26, 2015	287	Montreal, Quebec, Canada	Torture Chamber: Straight Outta Chamber	
16	Pat Guénette	2	July 9, 2016	308	Montreal, Quebec, Canada	Torture Chamber: Harley Davidson Rimouski	Pat Guénette defeated Stew Korvus in front of 1500 people at the Centre Premier Arena.
17	Antonio Corsi	1	May 13, 2017	190	Montreal, Quebec, Canada	Torture Chamber: Montreal Mayhem	
—	Vacated	—	November 19, 2017	<1	N/A	N/A	
18	Alex North	1	November 19, 2017	202	Montreal, Quebec, Canada	Torture Chamber: Showcase Sunday II	Defeated Dom Boulanger in a No Disqualification match.
19	Dom Boulanger	1	June 9, 2018	190	Ste-Hyacinthe, Quebec, Canada	Torture Chamber: Gala De Lutte Contre Le Cancer	
20	Genesis	1	September 26, 2015	174	Montreal, Quebec, Canada	Torture Chamber: Showcase Sunday XII	
21	Mike Marston	1	June 8, 2019	140	Montreal, Quebec, Canada	Torture Chamber: Gala De Lutte Contre Le Cancer	
—	Vacated	—	October 26, 2019	<1	N/A	N/A	
22	Dru Onyx	5	October 26, 2019	1,653	Montreal, Quebec, Canada	Torture Chamber: Straight Outta Chamber IV	Defeated Genesis in an Indian Strap match.
23	Wilson Colas	1	May 5, 2024	686+	Laval, Quebec, Canada	Torture Chamber Pandemonium 2	Defeated Dru Onyx (c) and Mustapha Jordan.

== Combined reigns ==
As of March 22, 2026.

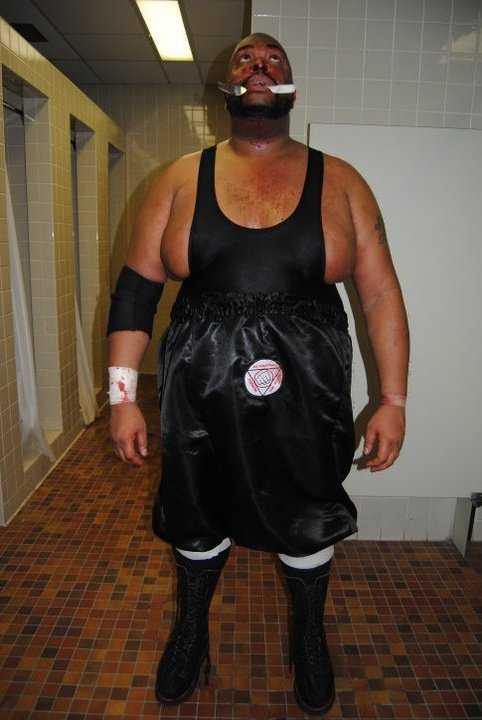
Record five-time champion Dru Onyx

†	Indicates the current champion

Rank	Wrestler	No. of reigns	Combined days
1	Dru Onyx	5	3851 - 4157
2	Pat Guénette	2	1000
3	Wilson Colas †	1	686+
4	Paul Tracey	2	425
5	Spyder	1	357
6	Stew Korvus	1	287
7	Alex North	1	202
8	Antonio Corsi	1	190
8	Dom Boulanger	1	190
10	Genesis	1	174
11	Fergal Devitt	2	158
12	Mike Marston	1	140
13	Karl Anderson	1	91
14	Adam Pearce	1	50
15	Justin White	1	49
16	Alex Koslov	1	28

== See also ==
- List of National Wrestling Alliance championships
- Professional wrestling in the United Kingdom
- Professional wrestling promotions in the United Kingdom
