= List of National Wrestling Alliance championships =

National Wrestling Alliance (NWA) is an American professional wrestling promotion operating via its parent company Lightning One, Inc. The following is a list of its active, defunct, and unsanctioned championships. The professional wrestling championships are not won through legitimate athletic competition; they are instead won via scripted endings to a match or on occasion awarded to a wrestler because of a storyline.

== Active championships ==
=== World championships ===
- NWA World's Heavyweight Championship
- NWA World Junior Heavyweight Championship
- NWA World Television Championship
- NWA World Tag Team Championship
- NWA World Women's Championship
- NWA World Women's Television Championship
- NWA World Women's Tag Team Championship

=== National championships ===
- NWA National Championship
- NWA United States Tag Team Championship

=== Regional championships ===
- NWA Mid-America Heavyweight Championship
- NWA Chicago Men's Heavyweight Championship
- NWA Chicago Men's Tag Team Championship
- NWA Exodus Pro Midwest Championship
- NWA Exodus Pro Women's Championship
- NWA Exodus Pro Tag Team Championship
- NWA JCP Southeastern Heavyweight Championship
- NWA JCP Southeastern Tag Team Championship
- NWA JCP Tennessee Stud Championship
- NWA JCP Women's Championship
- NWA Kross Fire Championship
- NWA Texas Championship
- NWA WLW Heavyweight Championship
- NWA WLW Junior Heavyweight Championship
- NWA WLW Tag Team Championship
- NWA WLW Ladies Championship

=== Unsanctioned championships ===
- NWA World Historic Light Heavyweight Championship (Consejo Mundial de Lucha Libre)
- NWA World Historic Middleweight Championship (Consejo Mundial de Lucha Libre)
- NWA World Historic Welterweight Championship (Consejo Mundial de Lucha Libre)
- NWA World Junior Heavyweight Championship (Pro Wrestling Zero1)
- NWA International Heavyweight Championship (All-Japan Pro Wrestling)
- NWA International Junior Heavyweight Championship (Pro Wrestling Zero1)
- NWA British Commonwealth Heavyweight Championship (Torture Chamber Pro Wrestling)
- NWA United National Championship (All-Japan Pro Wrestling)
- NWA Intercontinental Tag Team Championship (Pro Wrestling Zero1)
- NWA Canadian Tag Team Championship (Torture Chamber Pro Wrestling)

== Inactive/defunct championships ==
=== World championships ===
- NWA World Super Heavyweight Championship (Zero1 Version)
- NWA World Light Heavyweight Championship
- NWA World Light Heavyweight Championship (New Jersey version)
- NWA World Light Heavyweight Championship (Australian version)
- NWA World Middleweight Championship
- NWA World Welterweight Championship
- NWA-Wallabee Worlds Martial-Arts Championship
- NWA Universal Heavyweight Championship
- NWA World Tag Team Championship (Amarillo version)
- NWA World Tag Team Championship (Central States version)
- NWA World Tag Team Championship (Chicago version)
- NWA World Tag Team Championship (Georgia version)
- NWA World Tag Team Championship (Florida version)
- NWA World Tag Team Championship (Detroit version)
- NWA World Tag Team Championship (Los Angeles version)
- NWA World Tag Team Championship (Mid-America version)
- NWA World Tag Team Championship (Mid-Atlantic version)
- NWA World Tag Team Championship (Minneapolis version)
- NWA World Tag Team Championship (San Francisco version)
- NWA World Tag Team Championship (Texas version)
- NWA World Tag Team Championship (Vancouver version)
- NWA Universal Tag Team Championship
- NWA Independent World Heavyweight Championship (promoted by Sabu)
- NWA World Brass Knuckles Championship (Tennessee version)
- NWA World Six-Man Tag Team Championship (Mid-Atlantic version)
- NWA World Six-Man Tag Team Championship (Texas version)
- NWA World Six-Man Tag Team Championship (Tennessee version)
- NWA World Television Championship (Mid-Atlantic version)
- NWA World Television Championship (Wildside version)
- NWA (World) Television Championship (All-Star version)
- NWA Universal Television Championship
- NWA Universal X Division Championship

=== National championships ===
- NWA National Women's Television Championship
- NWA American Heavyweight Championship
- NWA American Tag Team Championship
- NWA Americas Heavyweight Championship
- NWA Americas Tag Team Championship
- NWA Austra-Asian Heavyweight Championship
- NWA Austra-Asian Tag Team Championship
- NWA Australian Heavyweight Championship
- NWA British Empire Heavyweight Championship (Toronto version)
- NWA British Empire Heavyweight Championship (Vancouver version)
- NWA Canadian Heavyweight Championship (Calgary version)
- NWA Canadian Heavyweight Championship (Halifax version)
- NWA Canadian Heavyweight Championship (Toronto version)
- NWA Canadian Heavyweight Championship (Vancouver version)
- NWA Canadian Open Tag Team Championship
- NWA Canadian Tag Team Championship (Calgary version)
- NWA Canadian Tag Team Championship (Vancouver version)
- NWA Canadian Television Championship
- NWA Intercontinental Heavyweight Championship (CMLL version)
- NWA International Light Heavyweight Championship (Toryumon Version)
- NWA International Tag Team Championship (Toronto version)
- NWA International Tag Team Championship (Vancouver version)
- NWA International Tag Team Championship (All-Japan Version)
- NWA International Tag Team Championship (Calgary Version)
- NWA International Tag Team Championship (Maritimes Version)
- NWA International Tag Team Championship (Georgia Version)
- NWA International Lightweight Tag Team Championship
- NWA Ireland Heavyweight Championship
- NWA Ireland Tag Team Championship
- NWA Mexico Welterweight Championship
- NWA Mexico Lightweight Championship
- NWA Mexico Tag Team Championship
- NWA National Tag Team Championship
- NWA National Television Championship
- NWA New Zealand Heavyweight Championship
- NWA North American Heavyweight Championship (Hawaii version)
- NWA North American Heavyweight Championship (Tri-State version)
- NWA North American Heavyweight Championship (Amarillo version)
- NWA North American Heavyweight Championship (Calgary Version)
- NWA North American Heavyweight Championship (Maritimes Version)
- NWA North American Heavyweight Championship (WWC Version)
- NWA North American Tag Team Championship (Central States version)
- NWA North American Tag Team Championship (Florida version)
- NWA North American Tag Team Championship (Los Angeles/Japan version)
- NWA North American Tag Team Championship (Puerto Rico/WWC version)
- NWA Pan-Pacific Premium Heavyweight Championship (Zero1 Version)
- NWA Pro Australia Tag Team Championship
- NWA United States Heavyweight Championship (Mid-Atlantic version) (currently defended in WWE as the WWE United States Championship)
- NWA United States Heavyweight Championship (Central States version)
- NWA United States Heavyweight Championship (Chicago Version)
- NWA United States Heavyweight Championship (Detroit version)
- NWA United States Heavyweight Championship (Zero1 Version)
- NWA United States Heavyweight Championship (Hawaii version)
- NWA United States Heavyweight Championship (Indiana version)
- NWA United States Heavyweight Championship (Rocky Mountains Version)
- NWA United States Heavyweight Championship (St. Joseph Version)
- NWA United States Heavyweight Championship (Toronto version)
- NWA United States Junior Heavyweight Championship (Southeast Version)
- NWA United States Junior Heavyweight Championship (Tri-State Version)
- NWA United States Junior Heavyweight Championship (Mid-American Version)
- NWA United States Junior Heavyweight Championship (Georgia Version)
- NWA United States Tag Team Championship (Florida version)
- NWA United States Tag Team Championship (Mid-American Version)
- NWA United States Tag Team Championship (Mid-Atlantic version)
- NWA United States Tag Team Championship (Northeast version)
- NWA United States Tag Team Championship (Tri-State version)
- NWA United States Tag Team Championship (Gulf Coast version)
- NWA United States Women's Championship
- NWA Canadian Heavyweight Championship
- NWA International Lightweight Tag Team Championship
- NWA North American Heavyweight Championship
- NWA North American Tag Team Championship
- NWA Scottish Heavyweight Championship
- NWA United Kingdom Heavyweight Championship
- NWA United Kingdom Junior Heavyweight Championship

=== Regional championships ===
- NWA Alabama Heavyweight Championship
- NWA Alberta Tag Team Championship
- NWA Anarchy Heavyweight Championship
- NWA Anarchy Tag Team Championship
- NWA Anarchy Television Championship
- NWA Anarchy Young Lions Championship
- NWA Arizona Heavyweight Championship
- NWA Arizona Tag Team Championship
- NWA Arizona Women's Championship
- NWA Arkansas Heavyweight Championship
- NWA Atlantic Coast Tag Team Championship
- NWA "Beat the Champ" Television Championship
- NWA Blue Ridge Heavyweight Championship
- NWA Blue Ridge Tag Team Championship
- NWA Blue Ridge Television Championship
- NWA Blue Ridge Women's Championship
- NWA Brass Knuckles Championship (Amarillo version)
- NWA Brass Knuckles Championship (Florida version)
- NWA Brass Knuckles Championship (Mid-Atlantic version)
- NWA Brass Knuckles Championship (New England version)
- NWA Brass Knuckles Championship (Southeastern version)
- NWA Carolinas Women's Championship
- NWA Brass Knuckles Championship (Texas version)
- NWA Brass Knuckles Championship (Tri-State version)
- NWA California Heavyweight Championship
- NWA Central States Tag Team Championship
- NWA Central States Television Championship
- NWA Charlotte Cruiserweight Championship
- NWA Charlotte Heavyweight Championship
- NWA Charlotte Legends Heavyweight Championship
- NWA City of Laurel Tag Team Championship
- NWA City of Mobile Heavyweight Championship
- NWA City of Pensacola Heavyweight Championship
- NWA Colorado Heavyweight Championship
- NWA Dakota Outlaw Championship
- NWA Dakota Tag Team Championship
- NWA East Junior Heavyweight Championship
- NWA East SEX Women's Championship
- NWA East X Division Championship
- NWA/ECCW Heavyweight Championship
- NWA/ECCW Tag Team Championship
- NWA European Heavyweight Championship
- NWA Eastern States Heavyweight Championship
- NWA Empire Heavyweight Championship
- NWA Empire Lord of the Dance Championship
- NWA Empire Tag Team Championship
- NWA Florida Bahamian Championship
- NWA Florida Heavyweight Championship
- NWA Florida Junior Heavyweight Championship
- NWA Florida Tag Team Championship
- NWA Florida Television Championship
- NWA Florida Global Tag Team Championship
- NWA Florida Women's Championship
- NWA Florida X Division Championship
- NWA Force-1 Iron League Championship
- NWA Force-1 Junior Heavyweight Championship
- NWA FTA Championship
- NWA FTA Dual Action Championship
- NWA FTA United National Championship
- NWA Georgia Heavyweight Championship
- NWA Georgia Junior Heavyweight Championship
- NWA Georgia Tag Team Championship
- NWA Georgia Television Championship
- NWA Gulf Coast Tag Team Championship
- NWA Hawaii Heavyweight Championship
- NWA Hawaii Tag Team Championship
- NWA Heartland State Heavyweight Championship
- NWA Heritage Championship
- NWA Heritage Tag Team Championship
- NWA Hollywood Television Championship
- NWA Houston Outlaw Championship
- NWA Idaho Heavyweight Championship
- NWA Illinois Heavyweight Championship
- NWA Indiana Heavyweight Championship
- NWA Iowa Heavyweight Championship
- NWA World Junior Heavyweight Title (Iowa Version)
- NWA Louisiana Heavyweight Championship
- NWA Macon Tag Team Championship
- NWA Maryland Heavyweight Championship
- NWA Massachusetts Heavyweight Championship
- NWA Massachusetts Tag Team Championship
- NWA Mid-Atlantic Heavyweight Championship
- NWA Mid-America Tag Team Championship
- NWA Mid-Atlantic Television Championship
- NWA Midwest Heavyweight Championship
- NWA Midwest Tag Team Championship
- NWA Midwest Women's Championship
- NWA Midwest X Division Championship (currently defended in Pro Wrestling Zero1 as the Zero1 USA World Junior Heavyweight Championship)
- NWA Mississippi Heavyweight Championship
- NWA Missouri Heavyweight Championship
- NWA Mountain Empire Championship
- NWA Mountain State Light Heavyweight Championship
- NWA Nashville Television Championship
- NWA New England Colonial Heavyweight Championship
- NWA New England Heavyweight Championship
- NWA New England Junior Heavyweight Championship
- NWA New England Tag Team Championship
- NWA New England Television Championship
- NWA New England Women's Championship
- NWA New England X Division Championship
- NWA New Jersey State Heavyweight Championship
- NWA Northeast Heavyweight Championship
- NWA North Dakota Championship
- NWA Ohio Heavyweight Championship
- NWA Oklahoma Heavyweight Championship
- NWA Oklahoma Women's Championship
- NWA Oklahoma Heavyweight Championship (Southwest version)
- NWA Oklahoma Light Heavyweight Championship
- NWA Oklahoma Women's Championship (Southwest version)
- NWA Oklahoma X Division Championship
- NWA Oklahoma Texoma Championship
- NWA Oklahoma Tag Team Championship
- NWA Oklahoma Universal Heavyweight Championship
- NWA Oregon Heavyweight Championship
- NWA Oriental Heavyweight Championship
- NWA Oriental Tag Team Championship
- NWA Pacific International Championship
- NWA Pacific Coast Heavyweight Championship (San Francisco version)
- NWA Pacific Coast Tag Team Championship (San Francisco version)
- NWA Pacific Coast Heavyweight Championship (Vancouver version)
- NWA Pacific Coast Tag Team Championship (Vancouver version)
- NWA Pacific Northwest Heavyweight Championship
- NWA Pacific Northwest Tag Team Championship
- NWA Pacific Northwest Television Championship
- NWA-TNA X Division Championship
- NWA Women's Pacific/NEO Single Championship
- NWA Panama City Heavyweight Championship
- NWA Pennsylvania Heavyweight Championship
- PWX Brass Knuckles Championship
- PWX Heavyweight Championship
- PWX Tag Team Championship
- PWX Three Rivers Championship
- NWA Rocky Mountain Heavyweight Championship
- NWA San Joaquin Valley Tag Team Championship
- NWA Southeastern Heavyweight Championship (Northern Division)
- NWA Southeastern Continental Heavyweight Championship
- NWA Southeastern Tag Team Championship
- NWA Southeastern Continental Tag Team Championship
- NWA Southeastern Tag Team Championship (Mid-American Version)
- NWA Southeastern Television Championship
- NWA Southeastern United States Junior Heavyweight Championship
- NWA Southern Heavyweight Championship
- NWA Southern Heavyweight Championship (Georgia version)
- NWA Southern Heavyweight Championship (Knoxville version)
- NWA Southern Heavyweight Championship (Mid-America version)
- NWA Southern Heavyweight Championship (Tennessee version)
- NWA Southern Junior Heavyweight Championship
- NWA Southern Tag Team Championship (Florida version)
- NWA Southern Tag Team Championship (Georgia version)
- NWA Southern Tag Team Championship (Gulf Coast version)
- NWA Southern Tag Team Championship (Knoxville version)
- NWA Southern Tag Team Championship (Mid-America version)
- NWA Southern Tag Team Championship (Mid-Atlantic version)
- NWA Southern Women's Championship
- NWA Southwest Heavyweight Championship
- NWA Southwest Junior Heavyweight Championship
- NWA Tennessee Tag Team Championship
- NWA Texas Junior Heavyweight Championship
- NWA Tri-State Heavyweight Championship (Alabama Version)
- NWA Tri-State Tag Team Championship (Alabama Version)
- Ultimate NWA Heavyweight Championship
- Ultimate NWA Tag Team Championship
- NWA Upstate Six-Man Tag Team Championship
- NWA Vancouver Island Heavyweight Championship
- NWA Virginia Heavyweight Championship
- NWA Virginia Tag Team Championship
- NWA Virginia Women's Championship
- NWA Western States Heavyweight Championship
- NWA Western States Heritage Championship
- NWA Western States Tag Team Championship
- NWA Wildside Hardcore Championship
- NWA Wildside Light Heavyweight Championship
- NWA Wildside United States Heavyweight Championship
- NWA Wisconsin Heavyweight Championship
- NWA Wisconsin Tag Team Championship
- NWA Wisconsin X Division Championship
- NWA Wrestle Birmingham Heavyweight Championship
- NWA Wrestle Birmingham Junior Heavyweight Championship
- NWA Wrestle Birmingham Television Championship
- NWA Affliction Heavyweight Championship
- NWA Central States Heavyweight Championship
- NWA Continental Heavyweight Championship
- NWA Florida Global Tag Team Championship
- NWA Houston Junior Heavyweight Championship
- NWA Houston Women's Championship
- NWA Kansas State Heavyweight Championship
- NWA Intercontinental Tag Team Championship
- NWA Lone Star Heavyweight Championship
- NWA Lone Star Junior Heavyweight Championship
- NWA Lone Star Tag Team Championship
- NWA Lone Star Women's Championship
- NWA Mid-Atlantic Heavyweight Championship
- NWA Mid-Atlantic Heritage Championship
- NWA Mid-Atlantic Tag Team Championship
- NWA Mid-Atlantic Women's Championship
- NWA Mid-South Unified Heavyweight Championship
- NWA Mountain State Heavyweight Championship
- NWA Mountain State Tag Team Championship
- NWA New York No Limits Championship
- NWA New York Tag Team Championship
- NWA On Fire Heavyweight Championship
- NWA On Fire Tag Team Championship
- NWA On Fire Television Championship
- NWA Upstate Heavyweight Championship
- NWA New York Tag Team Championship
- NWA Pacific Northwest Hardcore Championship
- NWA Pacific Northwest SuperGirls Championship
- NWA PURE Championship
- NWA Southeastern Heavyweight Championship (Smoky Mountain)
- NWA Supreme Heavyweight Championship
- NWA Tennessee Tag Team Championship (Smoky Mountain)
- NWA Southern Heavyweight Championship (Florida version)
- NWA Southeast Heavyweight Championship
- NWA Tennessee Heavyweight Championship
- NWA Texas Tag Team Championship
- NWA Texoma Heavyweight Championship
- NWA Texoma TagTeam Championship
- NWA Top of Texas Hardcore Championship
- NWA Top of Texas Heavyweight Championship
- NWA Top of Texas Junior Heavyweight Championship
- NWA Top of Texas Panhandle Heavyweight Championship
- NWA Top of Texas Tag Team Championship
- NWA Top of Texas Women's Championship
- NWA Top Rope Junior Heavyweight Championship
- NWA Top Rope Southern Tag Team Championship
- NWA United Kingdom Central Counties Championship
- NWA Upstate Heavyweight Championship
- NWA Virginia Alpha Heavyweight Championship
- NWA Southeastern Heavyweight Championship
- NWA Smoky Mountain Tag Team Championship
- NWA Smoky Mountain Television Championship
- NWA Mountain Empire Heavyweight Championship

== See also ==
- List of current champions in the National Wrestling Alliance
- List of National Wrestling Alliance territories
