= Dru Onyx =

Canadian professional wrestler

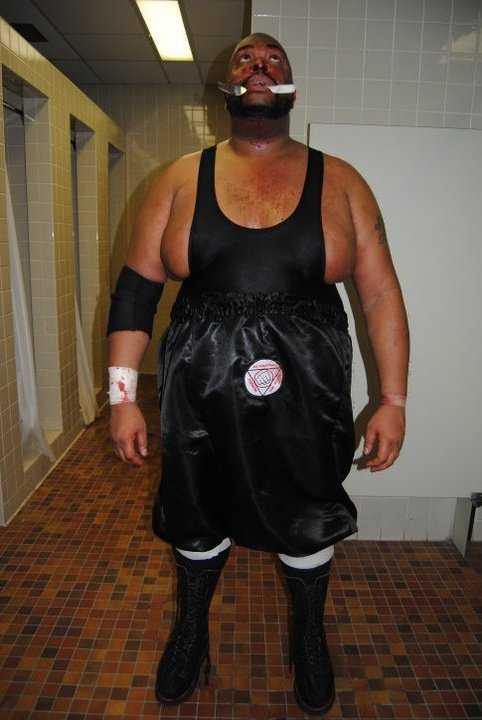

Personal information
- Born: Rodney Kellman; September 24, 1974 (age 52) Saint Michael, Barbados

Professional wrestling career
- Ring name(s): Dru Onyx; Soa Amin
- Billed height: 6 ft 2 in (1.88 m)
- Billed weight: 320 lb (150 kg)
- Billed from: Saint Michael, Barbados; Montreal, Quebec, Canada
- Trained by: Marc Pilon; Inoki Dojo; Tokimitsu Ishizawa
- Debut: June 12, 1999

Rodney Kellman (born September 24, 1974), better known by his ring names Dru Onyx and Soa Amin, is a Canadian professional wrestler, stuntman and trainer of professional wrestlers. He wrestled the majority of his career in Canada for the National Wrestling Alliance, and Northern Championship Wrestling.

== Early life ==
Kellman was born in Saint Michael, Barbados, but when he was still young, his family moved to Montreal, Quebec, Canada. Six years later, they relocated to Chomedey Laval where, as a teen, he played both baseball and football. Kellman played football for the John Abbott Islanders and the University of Ottawa Gee Gees. He also played Semi Pro for the Montreal Condors, Plattsburg North Stars, and Lake City Stars. He then worked as a security for the Saudi Arabian Embassy Consulate Section in Ottawa, Ontario, Canada.

== Professional wrestling career ==
Kellman started his professional wrestling career in February 1999 as a graduate of the Northern Championship Wrestling’s school. He was trained under the guidance of Marc Pilon. He debuted six months later against Pilon for the NCW Quebec Heavyweight Championship. In the fall, wrestling was put on hold to go play university football for the Ottawa Gee Gees. In 2002, he came back to the Montreal wrestling scene for Paul Leduc’s Federation Lutte Québécoise.

=== IWS ===
He then joined Internet Wrestling Syndicate (IWS) where he feuded with the Green Phantom over the IWS version of the World Heavyweight Championship for almost half a year. Upon winning the title on March 15, 2003 in his hometown of Laval, Quebec, he defended the title five months before losing the title to Arsenal in a ladder match.

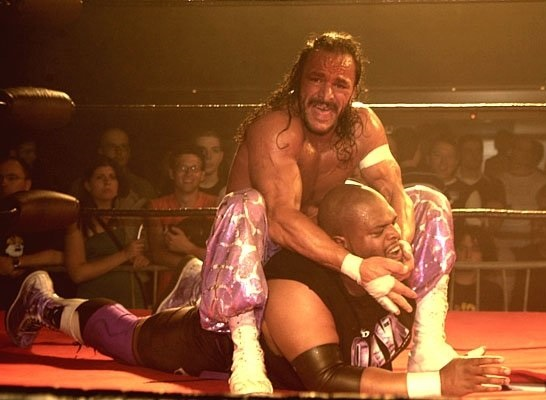
Sabu with the camel clutch on Dru Onyx at an IWS event.

Onyx returned to the IWS on June 3, 2005 to team up with his nemesis Green Phantom to battle Pierre Carl Ouellet and Sabu in what was Sabu’s last indie appearance before going to World Wrestling Entertainment.

=== National Wrestling Alliance and Championship Wrestling Association ===
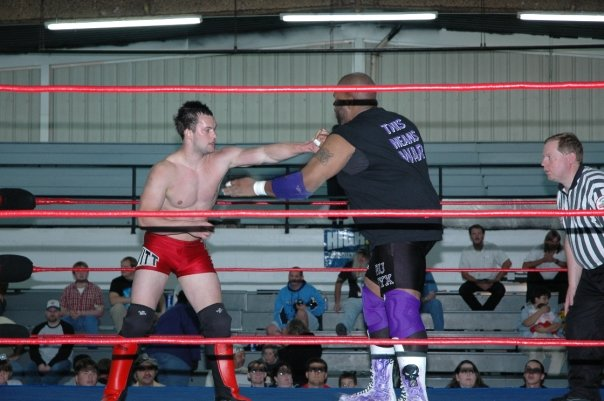
Squaring off with Prince Devitt.

Onyx first worked with the National Wrestling Alliance (NWA) was going on a one-week tour in 2004 for Andre Baker's NWA UK Hammerlock where he wrestled in tag team matches siding with Dany Williams in a series of matches against Fergal Devitt and Paul Tracey. In the United Kingdom, Onyx used his "Son of Abdullah" alter-ego, which is influenced by Abdullah the Butcher.

Shortly after a tour with NWA UK Hammerlock, Onyx joined Championship Wrestling Association (CWA) on January 28, 2004 and was their federation’s first champion holding the title for three months before losing the title to Sunny Warcloud on May 29, 2004 in an Indian Strap match. Onyx regained the Quebec title a month later in a three-way dance with Sunny Warcloud and Manuel Vegas. Later on when CWA joined partnership with NWA Quebec, the CWA title was then recognized as the NWA Quebec Heavyweight Championship. On October 15, 2004 Onyx won the NWA British Commonwealth Heavyweight Championship defeating Australia's Will Phoenix in Winnipeg. He then toured for NWA Ireland again using his "Son of Abdullah" alter-ego.

On his second tour with NWA UK Hammerlock, after making three mandatory defenses in England, he lost the NWA British Commonwealth title to Fergal Devitt (Pegasus 2) on October 27 in Cardiff Wales in a hardcore match. Two days later, Onyx beat Paul Tracey for the NWA United Kingdom Heavyweight Championship in Maidstone Kent. On October 29 in Ashford Kent, England he also won back the NWA British Commonwealth title from Devitt in a handicap match with Devitt and Tracey working together. Due to the fact the UK Heavyweight Championship had to be defended within the next 30 days, Onyx was forced to relinquish the title and concentrate on defending the British Commonwealth title for the last two days of his two-week tour.

On January 26, 2005 Jake Mathews defeated Onyx for the NWA Quebec Heavyweight title. On October 8, 2005 in Nashville, Tennessee at the NWA 57th anniversary show Fergal Devitt once again defeated Onyx for the British Commonwealth title. After the match both participants were invited to the New Japan Inoki Dojo.

Coming back from the Inoki Dojo Onyx captured more NWA gold on April 22, 2006 in Southern Championship Wrestling. In Almonte Springs, Florida, Onyx defeated Thomas Marr and Chasyn Rance in a three-way to win the NWA North American Heavyweight Championship.

Subsequently, he defended the North American title in both Canada and the United States, including on July 7, 2006 at a Total Nonstop Action Wrestling house show. He also defended the title overseas in both Ireland and in the UK. After an over one-year reign as North American Heavyweight Champion, he lost the title to Damien Waynes on August 24, 2007 in Las Vegas, Nevada. On October 26, 2007 in St. Albans, Vermont, Onyx defeated Paul Tracey to once again become the NWA British Commonwealth Champion.

=== NJPW ===
In October 2005, Dru Onyx lived and trained at New Japan Pro-Wrestling's dojo in Los Angeles, California, where he trained in pro wrestling alongside Fergal Devitt, Rocky Romero, Alex Koslov and Daniel Puder.

=== Top Of The World Wrestling ===
March 5, 2010, Onyx made his T.O.W. debut at the T.O.W. 5 in the main event, a 3-Way casket match in March 2010 for Montreal promotion TOW against Darkko and Sylvain Grenier; the match was won by Grenier. July 19, 2010 Dru Onyx fought Sylvain Grenier at T.O.W. 6 in a losing effort. September 24, 2010 T.O.W. 7 in the main event Sylvain Grenier & Hurricane Helms defeated Dru Onyx & Shelton Benjamin. Jun 3, 2011 T.O.W. 8.25 Dru Onyx & Carl Leduc defeated Sex Factor & the Flatliners for the T.O.W. Tag Team Championship. May 5, 2012 T.O.W. 9 Dru Onyx & Eric Mastrocola defeated Thomas Dubois & Mathieu St.Jacques.

=== North Shore Pro Wrestling ===
In 2010, Onyx wrestled mostly for NSPW, starting the year by losing the NWA British Commonwealth Heavyweight title to Adam Pearce on January 23 a title he had defended against Kevin Steen. In late February during the Weekend of Excellence, Onyx wrestled as Soa Amin against Darkko in a match that ended with a double countout, and on the night after Amin won a match against Pauly Platinum. For his next three NSPW appearances, he reverted to his Dru Onyx persona, winning a match against Michael Style on March 20. The month after he teamed up with Kevin Skully to take on James Stone and Michael Style on April 24 (a loss).

On May 8 Onyx participated in a 4-way match for the NSPW Heavyweight title against champion Kevin Skully, Michael Style and Mathieu St-Jacques. The match was won by St-Jacques. In July the Soa Amin character returned, teaming up with Giovanni to face the team of veteran Sunny War Cloud and Pee-Wee in a losing effort. On August 6, Onyx got another shot at the NSPW Heavyweight title again St-Jacques, once again coming up short in his bid for the championship. He bounced back with a win over Michael Style on September 8 and finished off 2010 with a loss in a chain match against Ismael.

As Soa Amin he got his revenge on Ismael, defeating him on February 5, 2011 in a falls count anywhere match. Onyx wrestled one more time for NSPW in 2011, losing to Damien Steele at NSPW Fifty on October 22. In July 2012, Onyx made a return to the company as Soa Amin, losing to Matt Falco. In late 2012 he participated in the Standing 8 Tournament, winning in the first round against Franky The Mobster before getting eliminated in the second round by Giovanni.

=== Montreal Wrestling Federation ===
Throughout 2011 and 2012, Onyx worked in the Montreal Wrestling Federation (MWF) as Soa Amin. After a loss against Franky The Mobster in September 2011, Amin defeated Jason Starr, Shayne Hawke, HC Ryder and then HC Ryder & Chris Cruze in a tag-team match where he teamed up with Hawke. In early 2012, he won against Bryan Kevins on January 14 before participating in a match with Jake Matthews that would end in a no contest on January 28. Soa Amin and Green Phantom teamed up on February 4 defeating the team of Stew Ramjattan and Jake Matthews. Later on in the same month Amin and Pat Guénette wrestled to a no contest. On March 17 at MWF No Remorse, Amin lost to Jake Matthews in a Last Man Standing match. On March 31, Amin and Darkko teamed up in a match for the MWF Tag Team titles against champions Stew Ramjattan and Pauly Platinum, losing the match by disqualification.

=== Northern Championship Wrestling ===
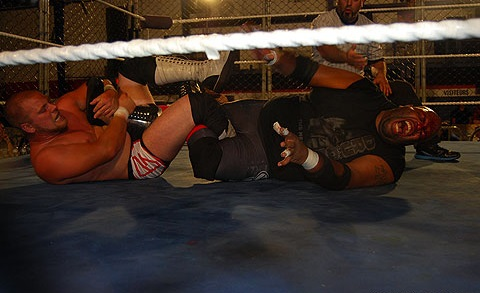
Pat Guénette applying the figure four leglock to a bloody Dru Onyx during the September 2013 NCW cage match for the Québec title.

In Northern Championship Wrestling (NCW), Onyx held the NCW Québec title for 11 months from June 2012 to May 2013 where he lost it to Pat Guénette. During his reign as champion, Onyx successfully defended the title against Jay Phenomenon, Handsome JF, Guénette, Gorgeous Mike, Pitbull Brando, William Brady, James Stone and Alextreme. He feuded with Pat Guénette, and they competed in a no disqualification match on June 22 at Fight Nationale for the Québec championship.

=== Other promotions ===
Victory Ring

On November 13, 2015, in Wickham, Qc, Dru Onyx became the second Victory Ring champion after defeating Alex North who held and defended the title for over a year.

In April 2010 he wrestled to a no contest against Gran Apolo for an NWA on Fire event held in Maine. Onyx along with Derek Platinum lost to the GCW-NS champions the Hillbullies (Jeff Black and Cousin Eddie) on February 4, 2012 in Oshawa.

In 2011, Onyx received in invitation to train at WWE's developmental camp in Florida and wrestle at several of their house shows. He used his "Son of Abdullah" gimmick at the camp.

On January 30, 2015, Dru Onyx wrestled his first match for Ring of Honor in Dearborn, Michigan on the Winter Warriors Tour against The Romantic Touch

Soa Amin

Soa Amin is Onyx's other known gimmick, which he has wrestled as often throughout his career, switching back and forth between this alter ego and Dru Onyx since October 2003. He was originally billed as the son of Hardcore Legend Abdullah The Butcher (unrelated in real life, but has been endorsed by him), who used originated the gimmick. Like his father, Soa Amin is a violent, bloodthirsty, and mysterious as he rarely talks. His appearance is highlighted by his many different costumes, and horned tip wrestling boots. Amin's tends to be much more aggressive and weapon-friendly with variety of submissions then the Dru Onyx character. Amin's finisher is a cannonball into the turnbuckle. The Soa Amin's is the gimmick most fans in England & Ireland know Onyx for, as he wrestled as Soa Amin throughout the 2000s for the NWA promotions NWA Hammerlock & NWA Ireland.

Onyx in 2004 opened his opened his own professional wrestling school in Quebec called Torture Chamber Pro Wrestling Dojo.

== Other media ==
In 2017 he appeared on Tele-Quebec’s show Cochon Dingue as himself. In 2016 he appeared in an episode of ALT for VRAK TV as himself.

2014-2015 Onyx worked on a French-Canadian sitcom produced by Radio Canada’s called La Theorie Du K.O. starring Remi-Pierre Paquin & Michel Cote, a comedy based on Paquin’s character losing his wife and is forced to become a professional wrestler to support his family. In the two seasons & twenty-five episodes. Onyx trained the actors in the art of professional wrestling, produced all the wrestling choreography, acquired pro wrestlers for the show, and was the onset coach throughout the series. Onyx also worked as a stunt double, doing the stunts and wrestling choreography for Kwasi Songui.

He released a CD titled Sinebriated in September 2004. It was released under his rap alter-ego R-Kade. Onyx began rapping when he was 16 and has collaborated with Bran Van 3000. In addition, he is the CEO of Clutch Records and is involved with a local talent agency.

=== Film ===
Year	Title	Role	Notes
1998	Line Up	Rapper	Supporting Role
2001	Basmet Watan	Body Guard	Supporting Role
2003	Mambo Italiano	Bouncer	Uncredited Extra
2014	Brick Mansions	Gangbanger	Uncredited Extra

== Championships and accomplishments ==
- All Canadian Wrestling
  - ACW Heavyweight Championship (1 time)
- Championship Wrestling Association
  - CWA Heavyweight Championship (2 times)
  - Gold Rush Battle Royal (2004)
- Combat Revolution Wrestling
  - CRW Quebec Championship (1 time)
  - CRW Tag Team Championship (1 time) - with Bryan Kevins
- Federation Canadienne De Lutte
  - FCL Tag Team Championship (1 time) - with Dom Boulanger
- International Wrestling Syndicate
  - IWS World Heavyweight Championship (1 time)
  - IWS World Tag Team Championship (1 time) – with The Green Phantom
- Jonquiere Championship Wrestling
  - JCW Heavyweight Championship (1 time)
- Montreal Wrestling Federation
  - MWF National Championship (1 time)
  - MWF Regional Championship (1 time)
- NWA Quebec Pro Wrestling
  - NWA Quebec Heavyweight Championship (2 times)
- NWA UK Hammerlock
  - NWA British Commonwealth Heavyweight Championship (6 times)
  - NWA United Kingdom Heavyweight Championship (1 time)
- National Wrestling Alliance
  - NWA Canadian Tag Team Championship (3 times) - with Jeremy Prophet (1 time) and Mike Marston (2 time)
  - NWA North American Heavyweight Championship (1 time)
- Northern Championship Wrestling
  - NCW Quebec Championship (2 times)
  - NCW Inter- Cities Championship (1 times)
- Top of the World Wrestling
  - TOW Tag Team Championship (3 times) - with Carl XL Leduc (1) and Eric Mastrocola (2)
- Victory Ring
  - Victory Ring Championship (1 time)
  - Victory Ring Tag Team Championship (1 time current) - with Wilson Colas
- Pro Wrestling Illustrated
  - PWI ranked him # 349 of the 500 best singles wrestlers in the PWI 500 in 2012
