= List of NWA World Heavyweight Champions =

List of professional wrestling champions

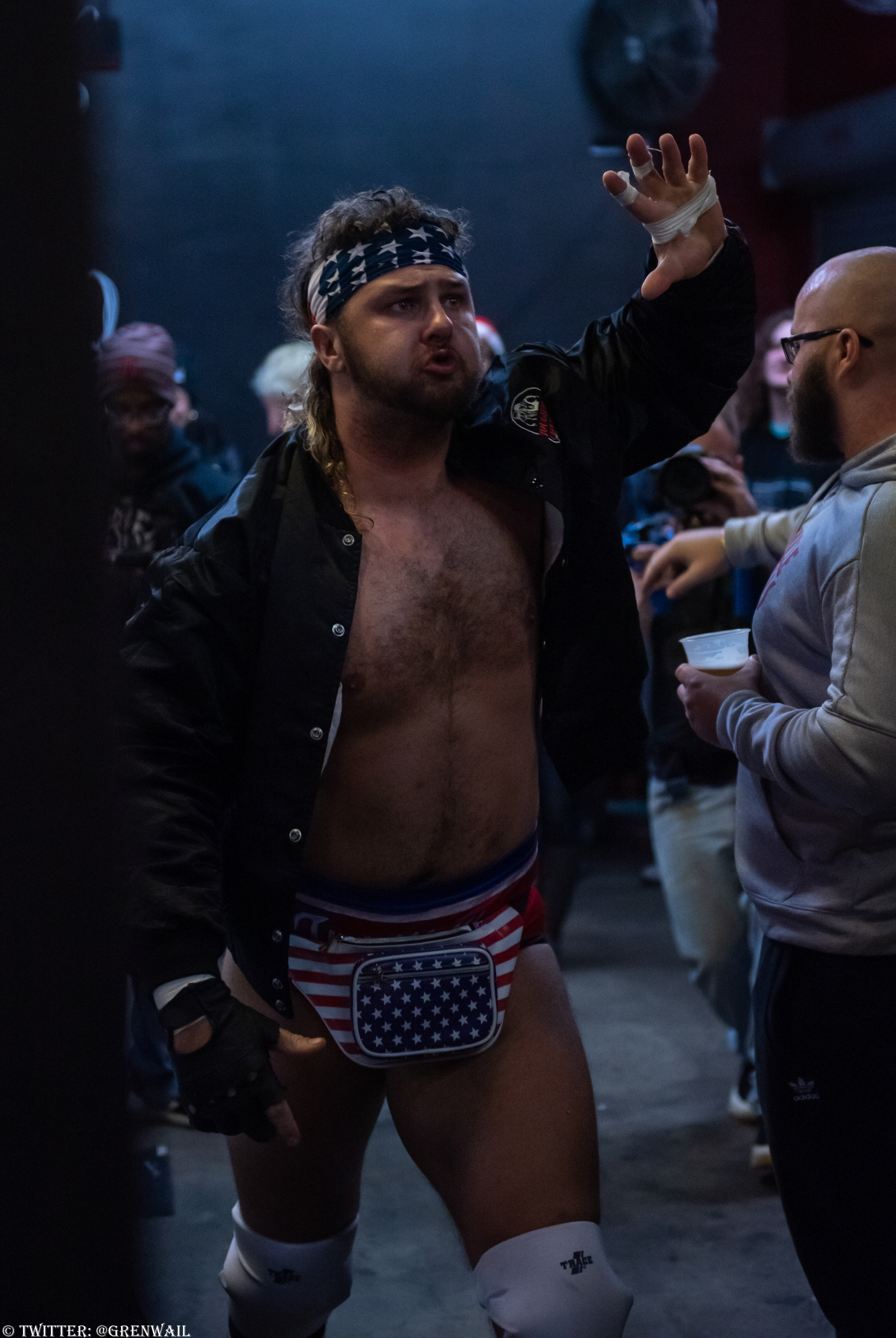
Current champion, Silas Mason.

The NWA World's Heavyweight Championship is a men's professional wrestling world heavyweight championship owned and promoted by the National Wrestling Alliance (NWA), an American professional wrestling promotion. It is the promotion's premier title.

NWA currently recognizes 103 individual World's Heavyweight Championship reigns. The inaugural champion was Orville Brown. The longest reigning champion is Lou Thesz, who held the title from November 27, 1949, to March 15, 1956, for a total of 2,300 days (6 years, 3 months, and 16 days); Thesz also holds the record for longest combined reigns at 3,749 days. Shane Douglas has the record for the shortest reign as champion, for less than 1 day. Ric Flair holds the record for most reigns with 8. The youngest champion is Chris Candido who won the title at the age of 22, while the oldest champion is Tim Storm, who won it at the age of 51.

Silas Mason is the current champion in his first reign. He won the title by defeating Thom Latimer at NWA 77th Anniversary Show on August 16, 2025, in Huntington, New York.

== Title history ==
=== Names ===
Name	Years
NWA World Heavyweight Championship	July 14, 1948 – October 21, 2016
NWA World's Heavyweight Championship	October 21, 2016 – present

=== Reigns ===
Key
No.	Overall reign number
Reign	Reign number for the specific champion
Days	Number of days held
Days recog.	Number of days held recognized by the promotion
N/A	Unknown information
†	Championship change is unrecognized by the promotion
<1	Reign lasted less than a day

No.	Champion	Championship change			Reign statistics			Notes	Ref.
No.	Champion	Date	Event	Location	Reign	Days	Days recog.	Notes	Ref.
National Wrestling Alliance (NWA)
1	Orville Brown	July 14, 1948	N/A	Waterloo, IA	1	501	501	On July 14, 1948, the National Wrestling Alliance (NWA) was founded in Waterloo, Iowa and Brown was recognized as the first official NWA World Heavyweight Champion. At the time of the founding of the NWA, Brown already held the Midwest Wrestling Association's World Heavyweight Championship and the Iowa version of the NWA World Heavyweight Championship; during Brown's reign, the two championships were unified into the NWA World Heavyweight Championship.	(Note: Duncan & Will (2000) p. 15 "Orville Brown 1948/07 Recognized as the first champion when the National Wrestling Alliance is founded in 48/07 in Waterloo, IA by Pinkie George with five other promoters.")
2	Lou Thesz	November 27, 1949	N/A	N/A	1	1,941	2,300	Awarded when Orville Brown suffered career-ending injuries in an automobile accident on November 1, 1949. Thesz had earlier won the National Wrestling Association's World Heavyweight Championship on July 20, 1948 from Wild Bill Longson. Thesz became the undisputed champion of all of wrestling by winning the Los Angeles Olympic Auditorium's World Heavyweight Championship, the remaining major world championship at the time other than the NWA World Heavyweight Championship, defeating Baron Michele Leone on May 21, 1952.	(Note: Duncan & Will (2000) p. 15 "Unifies following titles to become the Undisputed World Heavyweight champion: National Wrestling Association World Heavyweight title, having defeated Bill Longson on 48/07/20 in Indianapolis, IN; National Wrestling Alliance World Heavyweight title, awarded on 49/11/27 when champion Orville Brown is injured in an automobile accident on 49/11/01 before a unification match scheduled on 49/11/25 in St. Louis, MO; Los Angeles Olympic Auditorium version of the world title, defeating Baron Michele Leone on 52/05/21 in Los Angeles, CA.")
†	Leo Nomellini	March 22, 1955	House show	San Francisco, CA	1	115	—	Nomellini defeated Lou Thesz by countout in the second fall and disqualification in the third fall. The California Athletic Commission recognized the title change by disqualification, but both wrestlers continued to claim the title.	
†	Lou Thesz	July 15, 1955	House show	St. Louis, MO		244	—	Thesz defeated Leo Nomellini in a rematch.	
3	Whipper Billy Watson	March 15, 1956	House show	Toronto, ON	1	239	239	Watson won the match and the championship by count out.	(Note: Duncan & Will (2000) p. 15 "Whipper Billy Watson 56/03/15 Toronto, ON")
4	Lou Thesz	November 9, 1956	House show	St. Louis, MO	2	217	370	Thesz won the match and the championship by count out.	(Note: Duncan & Will (2000) p. 15 "Lou Thesz [2] 56/11/09 St. Louis, MO")
†	Édouard Carpentier	June 14, 1957	House show	Chicago, IL	1	40	—	Carpentier was awarded the title when Lou Thesz could not continue the match due to a back injury. In some territories, Thesz continued to be recognized as NWA World Heavyweight Champion, while in others Carpentier was billed as the champion.	(Note: Duncan & Will (2000) p. 15 "Edouard Carpentier # 57/06/14 Chicago, IL")
†	Lou Thesz	July 24, 1957	House show	Montreal, Quebec		113	—	Thesz won a rematch against Édouard Carpentier by disqualification. The NWA initially continued to recognize Carpentier as the champion, but voided any recognition of Carpentier as champion when he withdrew the claim for the title when Eddie Quinn, Carpentier's promoter in Montreal, quit the NWA in August 1958. Some territories such as Boston's Atlantic Athletic Commission (AAC), Los Angeles' North American Wrestling Alliance (NAWA, later WWA), and the Nebraska promotions continued to recognize Carpentier as NWA World Heavyweight Champion. The AAC recognized Killer Kowalski as world champion when he defeated Carpentier in Boston. Nebraska later recognized Verne Gagne as world champion when he defeated Carpentier in Omaha. Los Angeles recognized Freddie Blassie as world champion when he defeated Carpentier in 1961.	(Note: Duncan & Will (2000) p. 15 "Lou Thesz # 57 Carpentier withdraws his claim to the title when Montreal promoter Eddie Quinn leaves NWA; NWA voids all recognition of Carpentier as champion")
5	Dick Hutton	November 14, 1957	House show	Toronto, ON	1	421	421		(Note: 'Dick Hutton 57/11/14 Toronto, ON")
6	Pat O'Connor	January 9, 1959	House show	St. Louis, MO	1	440	903		(Note: Duncan & Will (2000) p. 15 "Pat O'Connor 59/01/09 St. Louis, MO")
†	Gene LeBell	March 24, 1960	House show	Amarillo, TX	1	<1	—	After LeBell defeated Pat O'Connor, he struck a Texas wrestling commissioner with the championship belt and the decision was reversed.	
†	Pat O'Connor	March 24, 1960	House show	Amarillo, TX	2	463	—	The title was returned to O'Connor due to the nature of the championship match.	
7	Buddy Rogers	June 30, 1961	House show	Chicago, IL	1	145	573		
†	Bobo Brazil	August 18, 1962	House show	Newark, NJ	1	73	—	Brazil refused the title because of a groin injury that Buddy Rogers had claimed to have. However, on September 6, 1962, Brazil was declared champion because a doctor had determined that Rogers had not suffered an injury. This title change is not currently recognized by the NWA.	
†	Buddy Rogers	October 30, 1962	House show	Toledo, OH	2	86	—		
†	Killer Kowalski	November 21, 1962	House show	Montreal, Quebec	1	61	—	Kowalski defeated Buddy Rogers on November 21 in Montreal after Rogers broke his ankle in the first fall. He was only recognized as champion in some states such as Texas until January 21, 1963 when he lost a rematch to Rogers in New York City. Kowalski disputed that Rogers had won the title during the rematch, arguing that the match had not been for the title. The NWA does not recognize any of Rogers' losses, with only one title reign counted for Rogers.	
†	Buddy Rogers	January 21, 1963	House show	New York City, NY	3	3	—		
8	Lou Thesz	January 24, 1963	House show	Toronto, ON	3	1,079	1,079		(Note: Duncan & Will (2000) p. 15 "Lou Thesz [3] 63/01/24 Toronto, ON Promoters in northeast refuse to recognize Rogers' one-fall loss to Thesz and start World Wide Wrestling Federation with Rogers as the first WWWF World Heavyweight champion")
†	Buddy Rogers	January 24, 1963	N/A	N/A	4	77	—	Promoters in the Northeastern United States refused to recognize Buddy Rogers' one-fall loss to Thesz, thus breaking away from the NWA to form the World Wide Wrestling Federation (WWWF). Rogers continued to defend the championship in the WWWF until he was declared the first WWWF World Heavyweight Champion on April 11.	
9	Gene Kiniski	January 7, 1966	House show	St. Louis, MO	1	1,131	1,131		(Note: Duncan & Will (2000) p. 15 "Gene Kiniski 66/01/07 St. Louis, MO")
10	Dory Funk Jr.	February 11, 1969	House show	Tampa, FL	1	1,563	1,563		
11	Harley Race	May 24, 1973	House show	Kansas City, KS	1	57	57		
12	Jack Brisco	July 20, 1973	House show	Houston, TX	1	500	500		
13	Giant Baba	December 2, 1974	House show	Kagoshima, Japan	1	7	7	This was a two-out-of-three-falls match.	
14	Jack Brisco	December 9, 1974	House show	Toyohashi, Japan	2	366	366		
15	Terry Funk	December 10, 1975	House show	Miami Beach, FL	1	424	424		
16	Harley Race	February 6, 1977	House show	Toronto, ON	2	926	926		
17	Dusty Rhodes	August 21, 1979	House show	Tampa, FL	1	5	5		
18	Harley Race	August 26, 1979	House show	Orlando, FL	3	66	66		
19	Giant Baba	October 31, 1979	House show	Nagoya, Japan	2	7	7		
20	Harley Race	November 7, 1979	House show	Amagasaki, Japan	4	302	302		
21	Giant Baba	September 4, 1980	House show	Saga, Japan	3	5	5		
22	Harley Race	September 9, 1980	House show	Ōtsu, Japan	5	230	230		
23	Tommy Rich	April 27, 1981	House show	Augusta, GA	1	4	4		
24	Harley Race	May 1, 1981	House show	Gainesville, GA	6	51	51		
25	Dusty Rhodes	June 21, 1981	House show	Atlanta, GA	2	88	88		
26	Ric Flair	September 17, 1981	House show	Kansas City, KS	1	145	631	Lou Thesz was the special referee.	
†	Jack Veneno	September 7, 1982	House show	Santo Domingo, Dominican Republic	1	<1	—	Veneno defeated Ric Flair in Santo Domingo. As Veneno refused to defend the title outside his native country, the title was returned to Flair on the same day.	(Note: Duncan & Will (2000) p. 17 "Flair allows himself to be pinned by Jack Veneno to avoid the riot from the audience, but the title is returned to Flair")
†	Ric Flair	September 7, 1982	House show	Santo Domingo, Dominican Republic		121	—		
†	Carlos Colón	January 6, 1983	House show	San Juan, Puerto Rico	1	4	—	Colon's WWC World Heavyweight Championship was also on the line. This title change is not recognized by the NWA.	(Note: Duncan & Will (2000) p. 17 "Carlos Colon # 1983/01/06 San Juan, PR")
†	Ric Flair	January 10, 1983	House show	Miami, FL		29	—	This was a fictional match; this title change is not recognized by the NWA.	
27	Harley Race	June 10, 1983	House show	St. Louis, MO	7	167	167		
28	Ric Flair	November 24, 1983	Starrcade	Greensboro, NC	2	117	164	This was a steel cage match. Gene Kiniski was the special referee.	
†	Harley Race	March 20, 1984	House show	Wellington, New Zealand	8	3	—	This title change was not authorized by the NWA. This title change was recognized by World Championship Wrestling (WCW) from 1993 until 2001, and has been occasionally recognized by the NWA since 2015.	
†	Ric Flair	March 23, 1984	House show	Kallang, Singapore		44	—	This title change was not authorized by the NWA.	
29	Kerry Von Erich	May 6, 1984	1st Von Erich Memorial Parade of Champions	Irving, TX	1	18	18	This match had no time limit and the title could change hands on a disqualification; Kerry pinned Flair to win the title.	
Jim Crockett Promotions (JCP)
30	Ric Flair	May 24, 1984	House show	Yokosuka, Japan	3	793	793	By early 1985, Jim Crockett Promotions (JCP) controlled many NWA territories and attempted going national, thus limiting championship matches primarily to performers under contract with JCP.	
31	Dusty Rhodes	July 26, 1986	The Great American Bash	Greensboro, NC	3	14	14		
32	Ric Flair	August 9, 1986	House show	St. Louis, MO	4	412	412		
33	Ron Garvin	September 25, 1987	World Wide Wrestling	Detroit, MI	1	62	62	Aired September 26, 1987 on tape delay.	
World Championship Wrestling (WCW)
34	Ric Flair	November 26, 1987	Starrcade	Chicago, IL	5	452	452	On November 21, 1988 the NWA's flagship promotion Jim Crockett Promotions was purchased by Ted Turner and renamed World Championship Wrestling (WCW). This further limited championship matches to performers primarily within the company.	
35	Ricky Steamboat	February 20, 1989	Chi-Town Rumble	Chicago, IL	1	76	76		
36	Ric Flair	May 7, 1989	WrestleWar	Nashville, TN	6	426	426		
37	Sting	July 7, 1990	The Great American Bash	Baltimore, MD	1	188	188		
38	Ric Flair	January 11, 1991	House show	East Rutherford, NJ	7	69	69	After this title win, Flair was also recognized as the first WCW World Heavyweight Champion.	
39	Tatsumi Fujinami	March 21, 1991	Starrcade in Tokyo Dome	Tokyo, Japan	1	59	59	Briefly defended along with the IWGP Heavyweight Championship. This title change was originally ignored in the United States.	
40	Ric Flair	May 19, 1991	SuperBrawl I	St. Petersburg, FL	7	112	112	As the initial Fujinami title switch was ignored in the United States, the NWA regards this as a continuation of Flair's seventh reign rather than the start of his eighth reign.	
—	Vacated	September 8, 1991	—	—	—	—	—	Ric Flair was stripped of the title upon signing with the World Wrestling Federation (WWF).	
41	Masahiro Chono	August 12, 1992	G1 Climax 1992 Day 5	Tokyo, Japan	1	145	145	Chono defeated Rick Rude in the final of the G1 Climax tournament.	
42	The Great Muta	January 4, 1993	Fantastic Story in Tokyo Dome	Tokyo, Japan	1	48	48	Muta's IWGP Heavyweight Championship was also on the line.	
43	Barry Windham	February 21, 1993	SuperBrawl III	Asheville, NC	1	147	147		
44	Ric Flair	July 18, 1993	Beach Blast	Biloxi, MS	8	59	59		
—	Vacated	September 15, 1993	—	—	—	—	—	WCW withdrew from the NWA on September 1, 1993. The NWA declared their championship vacant.	
National Wrestling Alliance/Pro Wrestling Organization LLC
45	Shane Douglas	August 27, 1994	NWA World Title Tournament	Philadelphia, PA	1	<1	<1	Douglas defeated 2 Cold Scorpio in tournament final.	
—	Vacated	August 27, 1994	NWA World Title Tournament	Philadelphia, PA	—	—	—	Shane Douglas, immediately upon winning it, refused the NWA championship and declared the ECW Championship, of which he was already in possession, to be a world championship. ECW then withdrew from the NWA.	
46	Chris Candido	November 19, 1994	NWA World Heavyweight Title Tournament	Cherry Hill, NJ	1	97	97	Candido defeated Tracy Smothers in tournament final.	(Note: Duncan & Will (2000) p. 19 "Chris Candido 1994/11/19 Cherry Hill, NJ Defeats Tracy Smothers in tournament final.")
47	Dan Severn	February 24, 1995	House show	Erlanger, KY	1	1,479	1,479		
48	Naoya Ogawa	March 14, 1999	Battle in the Hama Ring	Yokohama, Japan	1	195	195		
49	Gary Steele	September 25, 1999	NWA 51st Anniversary Show	Charlotte, NC	1	7	7	Gary Steele pinned Ogawa in a three-way match, also involving Brian Anthony.	
50	Naoya Ogawa	October 2, 1999	House show	Thomaston, CT	2	274	274		
—	Vacated	July 2, 2000	—	—	—	—	—	Ogawa vacated the championship to focus on training for his scheduled (but later cancelled) mixed martial arts fight against Rickson Gracie.	
51	Mike Rapada	September 19, 2000	Tango in Tampa	Tampa, FL	1	56	56	Rapada defeated Jerry Flynn in tournament final.	
52	Sabu	November 14, 2000	Night of Decisions	Tampa, FL	1	38	38		
53	Mike Rapada	December 22, 2000	Christmas Chaos	Nashville, TN	2	123	123		
54	Steve Corino	April 24, 2001	House show	Tampa, FL	1	172	172		
—	Vacated	October 13, 2001	NWA 53rd Anniversary Show	St. Petersburg, FL	—	—	—	The championship was held up after a Corino vs. Shinya Hashimoto title match ended in a no contest due to Corino being unable to compete after sustaining a head injury.	
55	Shinya Hashimoto	December 15, 2001	Clash of the Champions	McKeesport, PA	1	84	84	This was three matches held round robin style; Gary Steele vs. Steve Corino, Gary Steele vs. Shinya Hashimoto, and Steve Corino vs. Shinya Hashimoto. Hashimoto won the round robin matches.	
56	Dan Severn	March 9, 2002	Vast Energy	Tokyo, Japan	2	80	80		
—	Vacated	May 28, 2002	—	—	—	—	—	Dan Severn was stripped of the title after refusing to defend the championship on the inaugural NWA: Total Nonstop Action pay-per-view.	
Total Nonstop Action Wrestling (TNA)
57	Ken Shamrock	June 19, 2002	Weekly pay-per-view event #1	Huntsville, AL	1	49	49	In June 2002, Total Nonstop Action Wrestling (TNA) worked out a licensing deal with the NWA to control and feature the NWA Championship. Shamrock defeated Malice to win the title.	
58	Ron Killings	August 7, 2002	Weekly pay-per-view event #8	Nashville, TN	1	105	105		
59	Jeff Jarrett	November 20, 2002	Weekly pay-per-view event #22	Nashville, TN	1	203	203	Jarrett unified the title with the WWA World Heavyweight Championship during this reign.	
60	A.J. Styles	June 11, 2003	Weekly pay-per-view event #49	Nashville, TN	1	133	133	This was a three-way match, also involving Raven.	
61	Jeff Jarrett	October 22, 2003	Weekly pay-per-view event #67	Nashville, TN	2	182	182		
62	A.J. Styles	April 21, 2004	Weekly pay-per-view event #91	Nashville, TN	2	28	28	This was a steel cage match.	
63	Ron Killings	May 19, 2004	Weekly pay-per-view event #95	Nashville, TN	2	14	14	This was a four-way match, also involving Chris Harris and Raven.	
64	Jeff Jarrett	June 2, 2004	Weekly pay-per-view event #97	Nashville, TN	3	305	305	This was a King of the Mountain match, also involving A.J. Styles, Chris Harris, and Raven. Ron Killings defeated Jarrett on the June 23 weekly pay-per-view event for the title, but due to issues surrounding the title change, the title was held up, before Vince Russo gave Jarrett the title back.	
65	Ray González	April 3, 2005	Juicio Final 2005	San Juan, Puerto Rico	1	<1	<1	González pinned Jarrett on April 3 in San Juan, but the decision was reversed after the match due to an unauthorized referee counting the pinfall while the originally sanctioned referee was knocked out. Title change was ignored by TNA but was retroactively recognized by the NWA in 2015.	
66	Jeff Jarrett	April 3, 2005	Juicio Final 2005	San Juan, Puerto Rico	3	42	42	The title was returned to Jarrett due to the nature of the championship match. The NWA regards this as a continuation of Jarrett's third reign rather than the start of his fourth reign.	
67	A.J. Styles	May 15, 2005	Hard Justice	Orlando, FL	3	35	35	Tito Ortiz was the special referee.	
68	Raven	June 19, 2005	Slammiversary	Orlando, FL	1	88	88	This was a King of the Mountain match, also involving Abyss, Monty Brown, and Sean Waltman.	
69	Jeff Jarrett	September 15, 2005	International Incident	Windsor, ON	4	38	38	This was a "Raven's Rules" match.	
70	Rhino	October 23, 2005	Bound for Glory	Orlando, FL	1	2	2	Rhino won the right to face Jeff Jarrett in a Gauntlet for the Gold match after designated challenger Kevin Nash fell ill and withdrew. Tito Ortiz was the special referee.	
71	Jeff Jarrett	October 25, 2005	Impact!	Orlando, FL	5	110	110	Aired November 3, 2005 on tape delay.	
72	Christian Cage	February 12, 2006	Against All Odds	Orlando, FL	1	126	126		
73	Jeff Jarrett	June 18, 2006	Slammiversary	Orlando, FL	6	126	126	This was a King of the Mountain match, also involving Abyss, Ron Killings, and Sting.	
74	Sting	October 22, 2006	Bound for Glory	Plymouth, MI	2	28	28	Kurt Angle was the special outside enforcer. This was a Title vs. Career match where Sting put his career on the line.	
75	Abyss	November 19, 2006	Genesis	Orlando, FL	1	56	56	Abyss defeated Sting by disqualification after Sting pushed the referee.	
76	Christian Cage	January 14, 2007	Final Resolution	Orlando, FL	2	119	119	This was a three-way elimination match, also involving Sting.	
—	Vacated	May 13, 2007	—	—	—	—	—	Christian Cage was stripped of the championship when the NWA ended its business agreement with TNA.	
National Wrestling Alliance/Pro Wrestling Organization LLC
77	Adam Pearce	September 1, 2007	House show	Bayamón, Puerto Rico	1	336	336	Pearce defeated Brent Albright in the finals of the Reclaiming the Glory tournament. Pearce competed as a substitute for Bryan Danielson, who defeated Pearce in the semifinals but withdrew from the tournament due to a detached retina. Danielson was the special referee.	
78	Brent Albright	August 2, 2008	Death Before Dishonor VI	New York City, NY	1	49	49		
79	Adam Pearce	September 20, 2008	Glory By Honor VII	Philadelphia, PA	2	35	35		
80	Blue Demon Jr.	October 25, 2008	House show	Mexico City, Mexico	1	505	505		
81	Adam Pearce	March 14, 2010	House show	Charlotte, NC	3	357	357	This was a three-way elimination match, also featuring Phill Shatter.	
82	Colt Cabana	March 6, 2011	NWA Championship Wrestling from Hollywood	West Hollywood, CA	1	48	48	Aired April 2, 2011 on tape delay.	
83	The Sheik	April 23, 2011	Subtle Hustle	Jacksonville, FL	1	79	79		
—	Vacated	July 11, 2011	—	—	—	—	—	The Sheik was stripped of the championship for refusing to defend against Adam Pearce on July 31, 2011.	
84	Adam Pearce	July 31, 2011	NWA at the Ohio State Fair	Columbus, OH	4	252	252	Pearce defeated Chance Prophet, Jimmy Rave, and Shaun Tempers in a four-way match to win the vacant championship.	
85	Colt Cabana	April 8, 2012	NWA Championship Wrestling from Hollywood	Glendale, CA	2	104	104	Aired April 29, 2012 on tape delay.	
National Wrestling Alliance/International Wrestling Corp.
86	Adam Pearce	July 21, 2012	Metro Pro Wrestling	Kansas City, KS	5	98	98	Aired September 23, 2012 via tape delay. This was a two-out-of-three falls match and was match four of a seven-match series between Pearce and Colt Cabana. During this reign, ownership of the NWA World Championship and the NWA itself was transferred from Pro Wrestling Organization LLC to the International Wrestling Corp.	
—	Vacated	October 27, 2012	NWA Warzone Wrestling 14	Berwick, Victoria, Australia	—	—	—	Adam Pearce left the NWA and resigned as champion after the organization refused to allow him to defend the title in the concluding match of his seven-match series against Colt Cabana. While the match took place with Cabana winning, both wrestlers refused the title in the aftermath.	
87	Kahagas	November 2, 2012	Wrath of Champions	Clayton, NJ	1	134	134	Kahagas won an elimination match for the vacant title by last eliminating Damien Wayne. Match also featured Chance Prophet, Jason Kincaid, Lance Erikson, Anthony Nese, Papadon, Biggie Biggs, and Lance Anoa'i. Kahagas was the reigning NWA National Heavyweight Champion at the time of his victory.	
88	Rob Conway	March 16, 2013	A Monster's Ball	San Antonio, TX	1	294	294	Conway replaced an injured Jax Dane and defeated Kahagas for the championship.	
89	Satoshi Kojima	January 4, 2014	Wrestle Kingdom 8 in Tokyo Dome	Tokyo, Japan	1	149	149		
90	Rob Conway	June 2, 2014	Cauliflower Alley Club Reunion Show	Las Vegas, NV	2	257	257		
91	Hiroyoshi Tenzan	February 14, 2015	The New Beginning in Sendai	Sendai, Japan	1	196	196		
92	Jax Dane	August 29, 2015	World War Gold	San Antonio, TX	1	419	419		
National Wrestling Alliance/Lightning One Inc.
93	Tim Storm	October 21, 2016	House show	Sherman, TX	1	414	414	On October 1, 2017, Billy Corgan's company Lightning One, Inc. purchased the NWA, including the NWA World Heavyweight Championship. During this reign, the NWA's licensing model was abolished and championship matches were limited primarily to performers under contract with Lightning One, Inc. Additionally, the title was renamed to the NWA World’s Heavyweight Championship	
94	Nick Aldis	December 9, 2017	Cage of Death 19	Sewell, NJ	1	266	266		
95	Cody	September 1, 2018	All In	Hoffman Estates, IL	1	50	50		
96	Nick Aldis	October 21, 2018	NWA 70th Anniversary Show	Nashville, TN	2	1,043	1,043	This was a two-out-of-three falls match.	
97	Trevor Murdoch	August 29, 2021	NWA 73rd Anniversary Show	St. Louis, MO	1	167	167	This was a Title vs. Career match where Murdoch put his career on the line.	
98	Matt Cardona	February 12, 2022	PowerrrTrip	Oak Grove, KY	1	119	119	Aired via tape delay on the March 8, 2022 episode of NWA Powerrr.	
—	Vacated	June 11, 2022	Alwayz Ready	Knoxville, TN	—	—	—	Cardona vacated the title due to an injury.	
99	Trevor Murdoch	June 11, 2022	Alwayz Ready	Knoxville, TN	2	154	154	Defeated Nick Aldis, Thom Latimer, and Sam Shaw in a four-way match for the vacant title.	
100	Tyrus	November 12, 2022	Hard Times 3	Chalmette, LA	1	288	288	This was a three-way match, also involving Matt Cardona.	
101	EC3	August 27, 2023	NWA 75th Anniversary Show	St. Louis, MO	1	370	370	This was a Bullrope match with Tyrus's wrestling career on the line as well.	
102	Thom Latimer	August 31, 2024	NWA 76th Anniversary Show	Philadelphia, Pennsylvania	1	350	350	Aired on tape delay on October 1, 2024 as an episode of NWA Powerrr.	
103	Silas Mason	August 16, 2025	NWA 77th Anniversary Show	Huntington, New York	1	447+	447+	Aired on tape delay on November 18, 2025 as a special episode of Powerrr.	

== Combined reigns ==
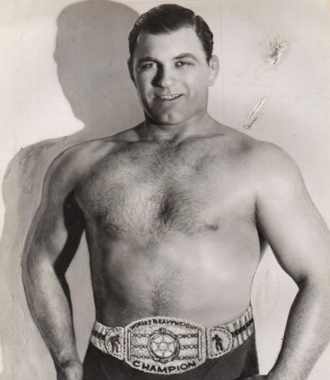
Inaugural champion Orville Brown

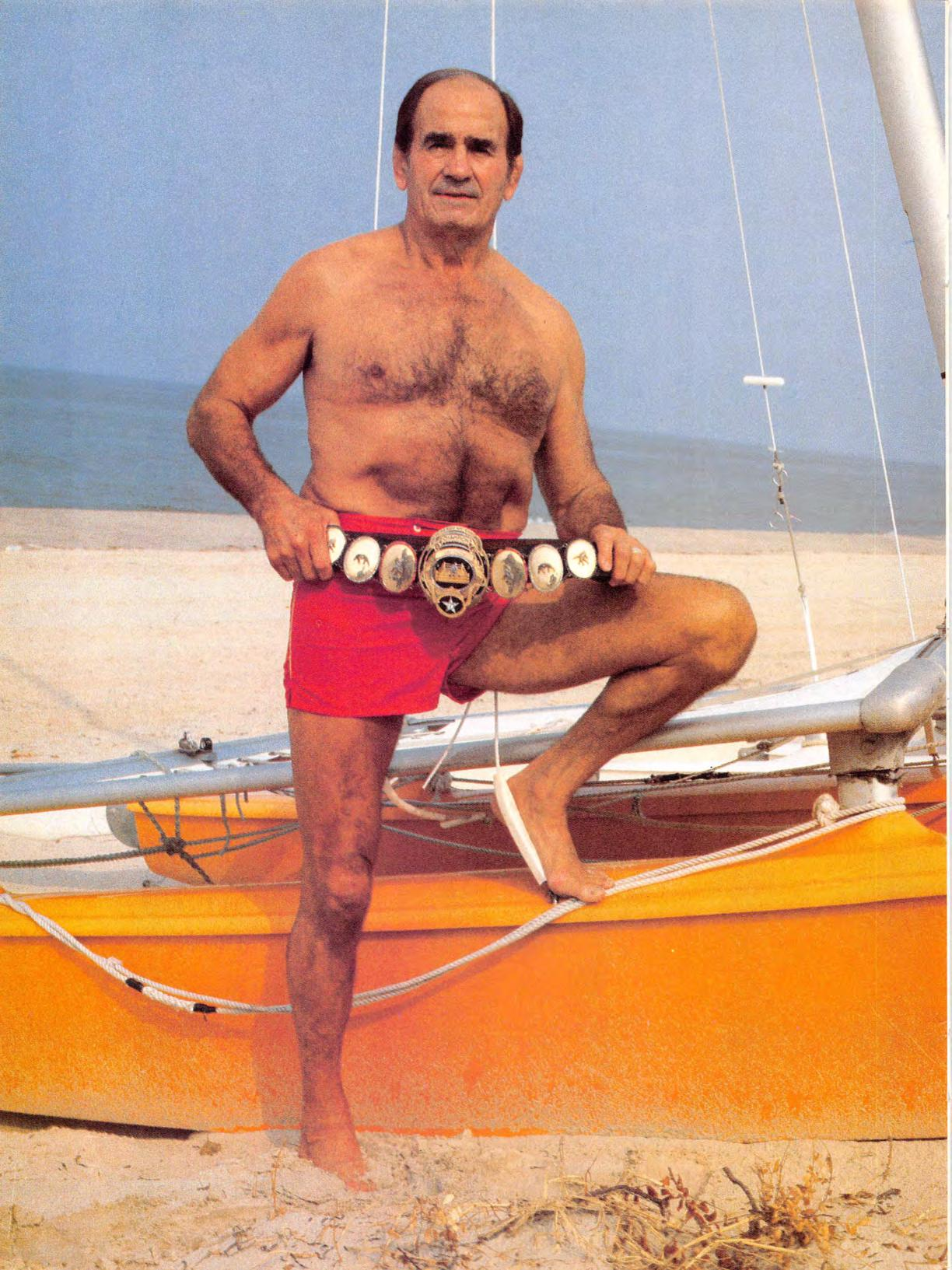
Three-time and longest combined reigning champion Lou Thesz

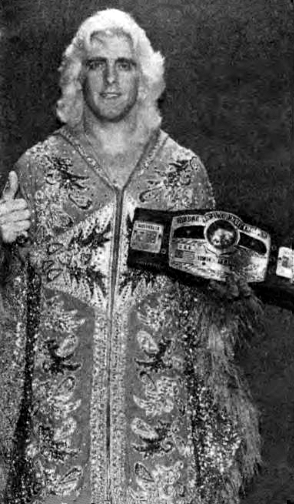
Record eight-time champion Ric Flair

†	Indicates the current champion
<1	The reign is shorter than one day.

Rank	Wrestler	No. of reigns	Combined days
1	Lou Thesz	3	3,749
2	Ric Flair	8	3,119
3	Harley Race	7	1,799
4	Dory Funk Jr.	1	1,563
5	Dan Severn	2	1,559
6	Nick Aldis	2	1,309
7	Gene Kiniski	1	1,131
8	Adam Pearce	5	1,078
9	Jeff Jarrett	6	1,006
10	Pat O'Connor	1	903
11	Jack Brisco	2	866
12	Buddy Rogers	1	573
13	Rob Conway	2	551
14	Blue Demon Jr.	1	505
15	Orville Brown	1	501
16	Naoya Ogawa	2	469
17	Silas Mason †	1	447+
18	Terry Funk	1	424
19	Dick Hutton	1	421
20	Jax Dane	1	419
21	Tim Storm	1	414
22	EC3	1	370
23	Thom Latimer	1	350
24	Trevor Murdoch	2	321
25	Tyrus	1	288
26	Christian Cage	2	245
27	Whipper Billy Watson	1	239
28	Sting	2	216
29	A.J. Styles	3	196
29	Hiroyoshi Tenzan	1	196
31	Mike Rapada	2	179
32	Steve Corino	1	172
33	Colt Cabana	2	152
34	Satoshi Kojima	1	149
35	Barry Windham	1	147
36	Masahiro Chono	1	145
37	Kahagas	1	134
38	Ron Killings	2	119
38	Matt Cardona	1	119
40	Dusty Rhodes	3	107
41	Chris Candido	1	97
42	Raven	1	88
43	Shinya Hashimoto	1	84
44	The Sheik	1	79
45	Ricky Steamboat	1	76
46	Ron Garvin	1	62
47	Tatsumi Fujinami	1	59
48	Abyss	1	56
49	Cody Rhodes	1	50
50	Brent Albright	1	49
50	Ken Shamrock	1	49
52	The Great Muta	1	48
53	Sabu	1	38
54	Giant Baba	3	19
55	Kerry Von Erich	1	18
56	Gary Steele	1	7
57	Tommy Rich	1	4
58	Rhino	1	2
59	Ray González	1	1
60	Shane Douglas	1	<1

== Footnotes ==
- Duncan, Royal; Will, Gary (2000). "United States: 19th century & widely defended titles – NWA, WWF, AWA, IWA, ECW, NWA: NWA World Heavyweight Title". Wrestling Title Histories: Professional Wrestling Champions Around the World from the 19th Century to the Present. Waterloo, ON: Archeus Communications. ISBN 0-9698161-5-4.
