= NWA Continental Heavyweight Championship =

Professional wrestling championship

The title was formed in the WWC promotion in 1994 when Jackhammer won a tournament. The title has stayed with the promotion throughout its various name changes and NWA membership being known as the WWC (World Wrestling Coalition), APWA (Action Packed Wrestling Alliance), RCW (Richmond Championship Wrestling), and NWA New York Heavyweight Championship before the promotion finally relocated to the Commonwealth of Virginia and became known as NWA Virginia. The National Wrestling Alliance recognizes this championship as the Championship of the Continent of North America. Its region is from Canada to Mexico through Puerto Rico.

On January 19, 2008, the NWA Virginia Title was unified with the NWA Southern Pro Wrestling Title to form the NWA Continental Title.

In April 2013, Fusion Wrestling left the NWA and their title was renamed the Fusion Continental Heavyweight Championship.

In January 2014, NWA R.A.G.E. renamed the title the NWA Continental Wrestling Championship.

== Title history ==
Wrestlers	Times	Days	Date	Place	Notes
WWC Championship
Jackhammer	1	60	April 1994	Barnegat, NJ	Won tournament to crown first WWC Heavyweight Champion
Mr. Motion	1	153	June 1994	Barnegat, NJ	
Tommy Logan	1	@92	November 1994	Barnegat, NJ	
The Overweight Lover (Biggie Biggs)	1	@28	February 1995	Barnegat, NJ	
Jimmy Jack Thunder	1	1	March 1995	Barnegat, NJ	
Declared vacant the same night by Commissioner T. Eacher stating it was a non-title match loss by Biggs
The Overweight Lover (Biggie Biggs)	2	@122	March 1995	Barnegat, NJ	defeated Jimmy Jack Thunder in tournament final
Maverick	1	@31	July 1995	Barnegat, NJ	
Rockin' Rico	1	@366	August 1995	Ocean City, MD	Rockin' Rico was the WWC Heavyweight Champion of record but left WWC along with many other wrestlers. He was named the champion of the APWA.
Renamed RCW Heavyweight Championship
Magic	1	@549	August 1996	Ocean City, MD	Magic is the current APWA Champion and was declared the RCW Champion as well
Renamed NWA New York Heavyweight Championship
Matthew T. Storm	1	90	February 8, 1998	Staten Island, NY	
Magic	1	91	May 9, 1998	Staten Island, NY	Won in a tag match Magic teamed with Wayne Woo vs. Storm & Lord Zieg. Magic pinned Storm.
King Kong Bundy	1	1	August 8, 1998	Staten Island, NY	
Magic	*2	126/217	August 8, 1998	Staten Island, NY	Bundy returns the belt after being informed of outside interference
Biggie Biggs	1	141	December 12, 1998	Staten Island, NY	defeats Magic & Blast in a 3 Way Dance
Blast	1	119	May 22, 1999	Brooklyn, NY	
Chris Michaels	1	@13	September 18, 1999	Staten Island, NY	Michaels won with help of Biggie Biggs
Vacated in October, 1999
Magic	1	@370	November 27, 1999	Staten Island, NY	defeated Monsta Mack in tournament final
Vacated in December 2000 when the promotion moved to Virginia.
Renamed in January 2001 NWA Virginia Heavyweight Championship
"Mr. Delicious" Jacey North	1	343	October 13, 2001	St. Petersburg, FL	Defeated Biggie Biggs at the NWA 53rd Anniversary Show to become the first NWA Virginia Heavyweight Champion
Preston Quinn	1	539	September 21, 2002	Richmond, VA	Quinn would defeat Brandon Day on July 26, 2003 to unify the belt with the vacant GWA Title
The Barbarian	1	328	March 13, 2004	Prince George, VA	
Vacated on February 4, 2005 Barbarian is unable to acquire a wrestling license in VA - Commission will not let him wrestle.
"Mr. Mid-Atlantic" Damien Wayne	1	155	February 4, 2005	Richmond, VA	Won vacant title in a Battle Royal. Defeated Preston Quinn as they are the last 2 men remaining
"The Heatmiser" Scotty Blaze	1	105	July 9, 2005	Sugar Grove, VA	
"Mr. Mid-Atlantic" Damien Wayne	2	259/414	October 22, 2005	Roanoke, VA	
"Wrestling's MVP" Sean Denny	1	266	July 8, 2006	Chesterfield, VA	
Vacated on March 31, 2007 Sean Denny had suffered a shoulder injury on a NWA Southern Pro Wrestling show					
Pharaoh	1	217	March 31, 2007	Mattaponi, VA	defeats Masked Superstar II by submission for the vacant title
"Mr. Mid-Atlantic" Damien Wayne	3	77/491	November 3, 2007	Mattaponi, VA	defeats Pharaoh in a title vs title match with the NWA North American Heavyweight Championship also on the line
Renamed the NWA Continental Heavyweight Championship on January 19, 2008					
"Mr. Mid-Atlantic" Damien Wayne	1	126	January 19, 2008	Ahoskie, NC	defeats NWA SPW Champion "Geordie Bulldog" Sean Denny in a title unification match to determine the first champion
Mike Booth	1	602	May 24, 2008	Ahoskie, NC	
Jimmy Cicero	1	@227	December 17, 2009	Shanghai, VA	
Vacant		August, 2010			Title stripped from Cicero because of injuries sustained in a car accident preventing him from defending the title within 30 days.
"Mr. Mid-Atlantic" Damien Wayne	2	182/308	October 16, 2010	Shanghai, VA	Defeated Mark Bravura in the finals of the King of the Mid-Atlantic Tournament in which the title was awarded to the winner.
Brandon Day	1	126	April 16, 2011	Shanghai, VA	This was a triple threat match that also included Victor Griff
Mark Bravura	1	609	August 20, 2011	Shanghai, VA	
Preston Quinn	1	273	April 20, 2013	Shanghai, VA	
FUSION left the NWA in October 2013 and renamed their title the FUSION Continental Heavyweight Championship					
Vacated in January 2014 when due to scheduling conflicts, recognized Champion Preston Quinn could not defend at R.A.G.E.					
Renamed the NWA Continental Wrestling Championship on January 18, 2014 when NWA R.A.G.E began a Tournament at R.A.G.E. I					
"The Brute" Mark James	1	119	May 17, 2014	Williamston, NC	Defeated William Huckaby in Tournament Finals at R.A.G.E. V
"The Morning Star" William Huckaby	1	463	September 13, 2014	Williamston, NC	Defeated Mark James and Preston Quinn in a 3-way at R.A.G.E. VII
"Badd Blood" BJ Darden	1	623*	December 20, 2015	Portland, OR	Defeated William Huckaby at NWA BCW's "Clash of the Titans"
The Vampyre Meka'i	1	1	September 2, 2017	Nashville, NC	Defeated "Badd Blood" BJ Darden at NWA MACW's "EXODUS".

== See also ==
- List of National Wrestling Alliance championships
