= NWA Canadian Tag Team Championship =

Professional wrestling tag team championship

Details
- Promotion: NWA: Extreme Canadian Championship Wrestling; Torture Chamber Pro Wrestling
- Date established: October 16, 1998
- Current champions: Wild Country (Derrick Butler & Jonny Taco)
- Date won: May 10, 2025
Statistics
- First champions: Brains, Brawn and Class (BBC) (Mike Roselli and Randy Tyler)
- Most reigns: Toxic Insanity (Biohazard and Juggernaut) (2 times)

The NWA Canadian Tag Team Championship is a tag team professional wrestling championship previously based in NWA: Extreme Canadian Championship Wrestling, although the title has been contested for in the Canadian Wrestling Federation, NWA Green Mountain and NWA Quebec. The title is currently owned by Torture Chamber Pro Wrestling Dojo along with the NWA British Commonwealth Heavyweight Championship.

There had previously been a version of the NWA Canadian Tag Team Championship used in NWA All-Star Wrestling from 1962 to 1985. The current version began in 1998.

== Title history ==
Wrestlers:	Times:	Date:	Location:	Notes:
Brains, Brawn and Class (BBC) (Mike Roselli and Randy Tyler)	1	October 16, 1998	New Westminster, British Columbia	Defeated The Glamour Order of Discipline (Johnny Canuck and Michelle Starr) and Karachi Vice in a three-way match.
The title was vacated when Roselli refused to defend against Toxic Insanity (Biohazard and Juggernaut).
Toxic Insanity (Biohazard and Juggernaut)	1	May 28, 1999	New Westminster, British Columbia	Defeated Moondog Manson and The Prophet.
Dan Danton and Spyder	1	July 22, 1999	Chilliwack, British Columbia	
Toxic Insanity (Biohazard and Juggernaut)	2	July 24, 1999	Nanaimo, British Columbia	
Toxic Insanity was stripped of the title in August 1999.
Crusher Carlsen and Michelle Starr	1	August 20, 1999	Regina, Saskatchewan	Defeated "Good Time" Charley Hayes (substituting for Biohazard) and Juggernaut.
The titles was stripped on January 1, 2000, due to lack of defenses, or vacated by Carlsen on April 8, 2000, due to an inner ear operation.
Deadly Impact (Killer Cox and Brian Jewel)	1	April 18, 2003	Winnipeg, Manitoba	Defeated The Kamakazze Boyz (The Casanova Kid and Mickey Miracle), Rick Matthews and Zack Mercury, The Redneck Rebels and Zero Tolerance (T.J. Bratt and Rob Stardom) in a five-team battle royal to win the NWA Canadian and Canadian Wrestling Federation Tag Team Championships.
Deadly Impact was stripped of the title on July 10, 2003.
The Twin Terrors (Koko and Razz Mansour)	1	March 26, 2005	Montreal, Quebec	Defeated Aftershock in a tournament final.
The Trauma Unit (Antonio Corsi and Stew Korvus)	1	May 19, 2007	St. Albans, Vermont	
Aftershock (Damian and Drake Styles)	1	November 30, 2007	Nepean, Ontario	
Pure Talent (Steve Blackwell and Ivan Sullivan)	1	March 20, 2010	St-Marc-Des-Carrières, Quebec	Defeated Aftershock in a match which saw titles vs. titles at a North Shore Pro Wrestling Federation event.
Jeremy Prophet and Dru Onyx	1	June 13, 2010	Hudson, Quebec	Defeated Bryan Lewis and Scott Ordell. Steve Blackwell and Ivan Sullivan had to vacate the titles due to an injury to Sullivan.
Team DAMKA (Shayne Hawke and Stew Korvus)	1	August 13, 2012	Montreal, Quebec	Defeated Pat Skillz and Paul Rosenberg.
Kickin' N' Stompin (Stephen Razen and Ivan Sullivan)	1	August 2, 2014	St-Prosper-de-Beauce, Quebec	Defeated Project DAMKA, Joey Ryan and Chris Cruze.
Bone Collectors (Dru Onyx and Mike Marston)	1	April 23, 2016	Montreal, Quebec	
The Night Train Express (Mustapha Jordan and Stephan Paulson)	1	December 17, 2017	Montreal, Quebec	

== See also ==
- List of National Wrestling Alliance championships
- Elite Canadian Championship Wrestling
- NWA Canadian Open Tag Team Championship
- NWA Canadian Tag Team Championship (Calgary version)
- NWA Canadian Tag Team Championship (Vancouver version)
