= Gary Steele =

British retired professional wrestler (born 1973)

Personal information
- Born: Gary Harvey; 1 May 1973 (age 53) Gravesend, Kent, England

Professional wrestling career
- Ring name: Gary Steele
- Billed height: 6 ft 3 in (1.91 m)
- Billed weight: 248 lb (112 kg)
- Trained by: Andre Baker
- Debut: May 1996
- Retired: March 2002

Gary Harvey (born 1 May 1973) is a British retired professional wrestler better known as Gary Steele, who has competed in European, North American and Japanese promotions and has been a popular longtime mainstay of NWA UK Hammerlock since the mid-1990s. A former Southern UK Champion, Steele was involved in a series of strap matches with rival Guy Thunder during the late 1990s and has occasionally teamed with Jake "the Snake" Roberts. A trained submission wrestler and martial artist, Steele also appeared at the Pro Wrestling ZERO-ONE PPV supercards "Fighting Athlete" in March 2001 and True Century Creation II in March 2002.

While competing in the United States with the National Wrestling Alliance, Steele defeated Naoya Ogawa in a three-way match with Brian Anthony in Charlotte, North Carolina on 25 September 1999 to become the first-ever English World Heavyweight Champion in professional wrestling history and one of the youngest wrestlers to win the NWA World Heavyweight Championship although he would lose the title to Ogawa one week later in Thomaston, Connecticut on 2 October.

He was managed by "Business Advisor to the Stars" Mike White (now working as a Sports Journalist for BBC Radio Humberside) at one stage.

Returning to Great Britain, he became the first NWA United Kingdom Heavyweight Champion after defeating Johnny Moss in a tournament final at Telford Shropshire, England on 2 November 2001.

Almost two years after Ogawa had vacated the title, Steele lost to then NWA World Champion Shinya Hashimoto in a round robin triangle match with Steve Corino at McKeesport, Pennsylvania on 15 December 2001.

He appeared as a contestant on the UK version of Deal Or No Deal on 28 June 2011.

== Championships and accomplishments ==
- Mid-Atlantic Championship Wrestling^{1}
  - NWA World Heavyweight Championship (1 time)
- NWA UK Hammerlock
  - NWA United Kingdom Heavyweight Championship (1 time)
- Pro Wrestling Illustrated
  - PWI ranked him # 202 of the 500 best singles wrestlers of the PWI 500 in 2001.

^{1}The Mid-Atlantic promotion he was wrestling in when he won the championship has been in operation since the late 1990s. While it operates out of the same region and has revised some of the regional Mid-Atlantic championships, it isn't the same promotion once owned by Jim Crockett, Jr. and sold to Ted Turner in November 1988. That promotion went on to be renamed World Championship Wrestling.
