= Andre Baker (wrestler) =

British professional wrestler (1964 – 2010)

Personal information
- Born: 24 December 1964 Ashford, Kent, England
- Died: 15 May 2010 (aged 45)
- Cause of death: Suicide

Professional wrestling career
- Ring name: Andre Baker
- Billed height: 5 ft 10 in (1.78 m)
- Billed weight: 240 lb (110 kg)
- Trained by: Dale Martin; Roy Wood
- Debut: July 1980
- Retired: c. 2001

Andre Baker (24 December 1964 – 15 May 2010) was a British professional wrestler, trainer, and promoter in the United Kingdom who competed in the United Kingdom mainly for NWA UK Hammerlock.

== Professional wrestling career ==
Baker was trained by Dale Martin and Roy Wood, who made his professional wrestling debut in 1980 at 15 years old. During the 1980s Baker worked for Dale Martin Promotions and All Star Wrestling.

In 1993, Baker founded Hammerlock Wrestling, which was later renamed NWA UK Hammerlock. After running some small private shows for friends and family at the Hammerlock gym from November 1993 onwards, the first Hammerlock event in front of a paying audience was held at the Leas Cliff Hall in Folkestone, Kent, in March 1994.

Baker only wrestled once in North America for Dennis Coralluzzo's NWA New Jersey on 29 July 1995, when he lost to NWA World Heavyweight Champion Dan Severn.

Baker's last known match was teaming with Jim Neidhart defeating Baker's student Jonny Moss and Chris Champion on 31 March 2001, for Hammerlock.

During Baker's career, he had a wrestling school and trained many wrestlers Finn Balor, Wade Barrett, Zack Sabre Jr., Jimmy Havoc, Katie Lea Burchill and many other wrestlers.

== Death ==
Baker died on 15 May 2010, after committing suicide. He was 45 years old.

NWA UK Hammerlock continued without Baker. The promotion held the 1st Annual Andre Baker Memorial Show on 21 May 2011, a year after Baker's death with his students. On 2 June 2012, the 2nd Annual Andre Baker Memorial Show was held. The last event for NWA UK Hammerlock happened on 10 November 2012.

== Wrestlers trained ==
- Adam Windsor
- Alex Shane
- Andy Hogg
- Cliff Compton
- Doug Williams (wrestler)
- Finn Balor
- Gary Steele
- Jimmy Havoc
- Jody Fleisch
- Johnny Moss
- Katarina Waters
- Neil Faith
- UK Pitbulls (Bulk & Big Dave)
- Wade Barrett
- Zack Sabre Jr.
