= Alex Koslov =

Moldovan-Russian professional wrestler

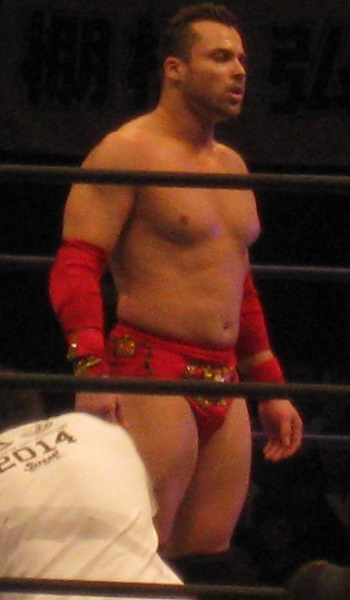
- Koslov in 2013

Personal information
- Born: Alex Sherman; January 21, 1984 (age 42) Chișinău, Moldavian SSR, Soviet Union

Professional wrestling career
- Ring name(s): Aleksandr Vladimirovich; Alex Koslov; Alex Pincheck; Alex Sherman; Cárlos Sanchez; Peter Orlov
- Billed height: 5 ft 9 in (1.75 m)
- Billed weight: 190 lb (86 kg)
- Billed from: Moscow, Russia
- Trained by: Jesse Hernandez; Skayde; Ricky Reyes; Kendo Kashin; Shinsuke Nakamura; Minoru Tanaka; Rocky Romero; Toru Yano; Bryan Danielson; Negro Navarro; Inoki Dojo
- Debut: May 23, 2003

Alex Sherman (born January 21, 1984) is a Moldovan-born Russian retired professional wrestler and color commentator, primarily working for New Japan Pro-Wrestling under the ring name Alex Koslov.

Koslov has mainly worked in Mexico from 2005 until 2008 for Consejo Mundial de Lucha Libre (CMLL), but in October 2008 he made a surprise jump to rival promotion AAA, where he worked until October 2010. In AAA he is a two–time AAA Cruiserweight Champion and a one–time AAA World Mixed Tag Team Champion with partner Christina Von Eerie. From August 2010 to February 2012 he was signed to WWE, working in its developmental territory Florida Championship Wrestling under the ring name Peter Orlov. After his release from WWE, Sherman resumed working on the American independent circuit for promotions such as Empire Wrestling Federation (EWF) and Pro Wrestling Guerrilla (PWG), while also making his debut for New Japan Pro-Wrestling. Sherman formed a tag team with Rocky Romero known as Forever Hooligans and would go on to win IWGP Junior Heavyweight Tag Team Championship twice and the ROH World Tag Team Championship once.

== Professional wrestling career ==
=== Early career (2003-2006) ===
Koslov was trained by Jesse Hernandez and made his professional wrestling debut in Covina, California on May 23, 2003, against Kid Karnage working as "Alex Pincheck". From 2003 until 2006 Koslov worked exclusively on the west coast of the United States, making appearances for promotions such as Pro Wrestling Guerrilla (PWG), Empire Wrestling Federation (EWF) and local National Wrestling Alliance (NWA) affiliated groups. From 2005 and forward Koslov began working in Mexico and later on started making appearances all over the United States. On June 11, 2006, Koslov won the NWA British Commonwealth Heavyweight Championship in Santa Monica, California from Karl Anderson, less than a month later he lost the title to Justin White.

In 2008 Koslov participated in the annual ECWA Super 8 tournament working with other young "high flyers". In the first round he defeated Shannon Moore in what was considered an upset, then he defeated Chase del Monte in the second round before losing to Aden Chambers in the finals. Koslov's performance earned him positive reviews. Koslov did not win the tournament but he stole the show, working as a villain he riled up the crowd enough for one audience member to threaten him with a chair.

=== Consejo Mundial de Lucha Libre (2006–2009) ===
In August 2006, Koslov began working for the Mexican lucha libre promotion Consejo Mundial de Lucha Libre (CMLL) as a villain, or a "Rudo" in Mexico. He was the first Russian to ever wrestle in Arena Coliseo in its 70-year history. Shortly after starting with CMLL, Koslov participated in their annual Leyenda de Plata tournament, losing to Místico in the quarter-final. He also participated in the 2006 Leyenda de Azul tournament defeating Hirooki Goto in the first round but losing to Dr. Wagner Jr. in the second round. In November, 2006 Koslov won an 8-man torneo cibernetico to earn a shot at the World Middleweight Championship, but lost against champion Averno. Over the next year, Koslov worked mid-card to semi-main event matches, usually in six-man tag team matches that is the most common match format in lucha libre. In May 2007, Koslov unsuccessfully challenged NWA World Light Heavyweight Champion Atlantis for the title.

Having turned into a crowd favorite, or "technico", in mid-2007, Koslov joined forces with Marco Corleone, Rey Bucanero and Shocker to form a group called High Society, a group of self-professed metrosexuals. The group saw limited success and by the start of 2008 rarely teamed together, when Rey Bucanero returned to Los Guerreros de Atlantida the stable dropped altogether. Throughout 2008 Koslov kept working mid-card matches, rarely working any kind of storyline, with the odd unsuccessful title match here and there.

=== Total Nonstop Action Wrestling (2008) ===
In 2008 Total Nonstop Action Wrestling (TNA) he was able to participate in the 2008 World X Cup Tournament that took place in June and July 2008. Koslov was part of Team International along with Canadian Tyson Dux, Brit Doug Williams, and Iranian American Daivari. Koslov made a couple of "pre-tournament" appearances defeating Curry Man one week and losing to Team USA captain Kaz. In tournament action Koslov lost to fellow CMLL worker Rey Bucanero representing Team Mexico. In the finals of the tournament, held at the Victory Road Pay-Per-View, Koslov took part in a four team triple elimination battle royal. He eliminated another fellow CMLL worker Último Guerrero and Chris Sabin from the match, before tapping out to Masato Yoshino in the second to last elimination of the match. Team International ended up with just three points finishing last in the tournament.

=== AAA (2008–2010) ===
After having worked on a handshake deal with CMLL for two years Koslov was approached by rival promotion AAA and offered a deal. According to Koslov he decided to take the deal with AAA because he was unhappy with CMLL's direction.

I was with CMLL for two years. They treated me great and made a star out of me, but I was dying mentally. I lost my passion. I became bored. It was always the same old stuff.

— Alex Koslov, Pro Wrestling Illustrated

Only a few people knew that Koslov had signed with AAA before he made his surprise debut on October 10, 2008, at a AAA Television taping in Querétaro, Mexico. To avoid spoiling the surprise Koslov had covered his face as he travelled to the arena, then stayed out of sight during the show. Koslov's defection to AAA made front-page news on newspapers and wrestling magazines, liking it to the Monday Night Wars between World Championship Wrestling and the World Wrestling Federation. Koslov helped found the stable "D-Generation Mex" together with Sean Waltman and Rocky Romero.

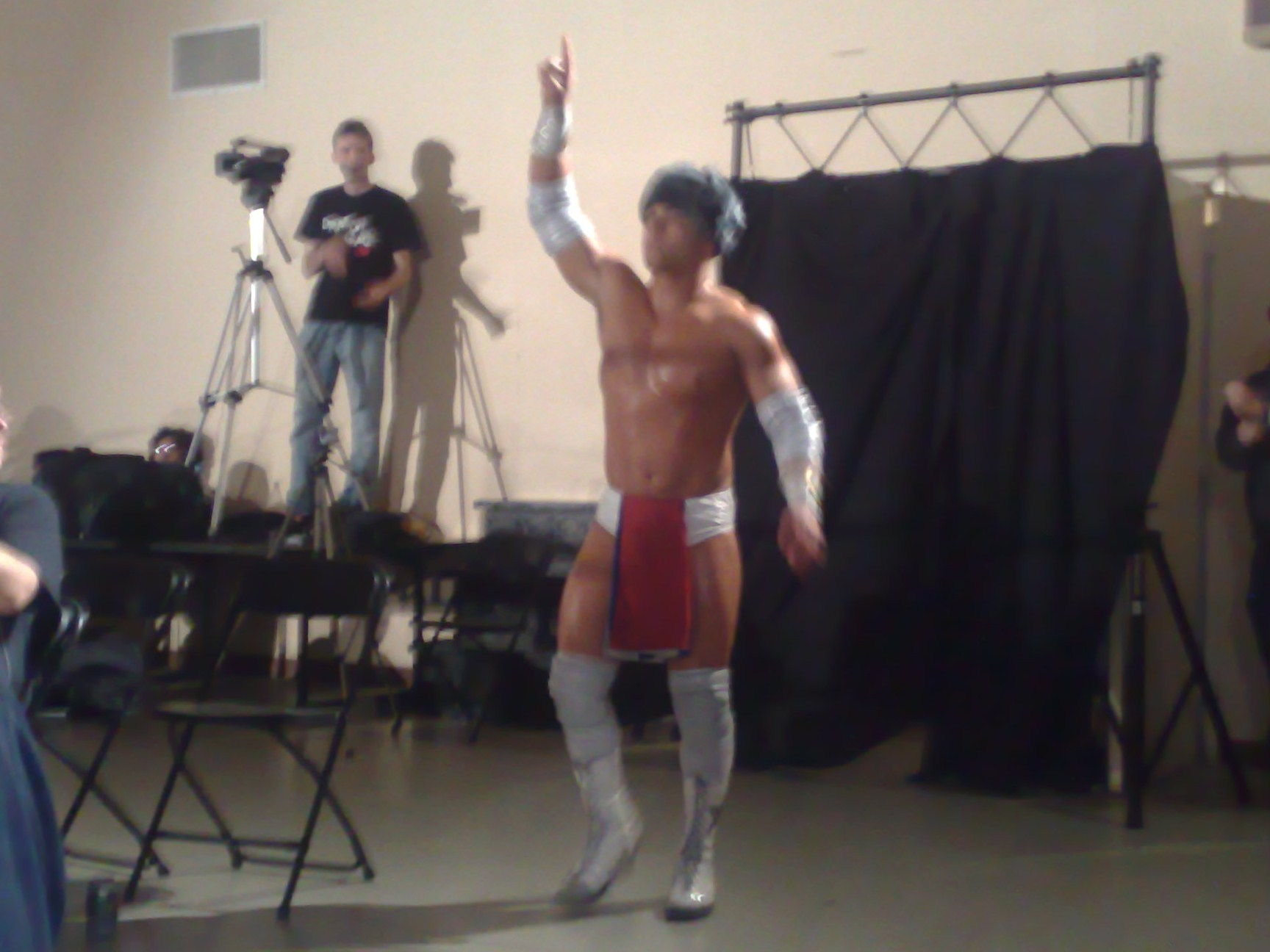
Koslov in January 2008

On March 20, 2009, Koslov was one of thirteen wrestlers in a "Dome of Death" cage match to qualify for a tournament to establish the AAA Cruiserweight Championship where he qualified for the tournament itself. In the first round Koslov defeated his D-Generation-Mex partner Rocky Romero on April 17, 2009. After the match the two partners hugged without showing any animosity between them. In the semi-final Koslov defeated Nicho el Millonario to qualify for the final. On May 21 Koslov defeated Extreme Tiger and Alan Stone to become the first ever AAA Cruiserweight Champion. Alex Koslov's run with the Cruiserweight title only lasted 23 days as he lost to Extreme Tiger at Triplemania XVII on June 13, 2009. Following the title loss Koslov turned Rudo attacking his D-Generation-Mex partners after a match. On August 21, 2009, Koslov regained the Cruiserweight championship by winning a five-way elimination match at the 2009 Verano de Escándalo defeating Extreme Tiger, Jack Evans, Teddy Hart and Rocky Romero. On August 30 Koslov lost a six-man steel cage match and as a result was forced out of AAA. Koslov confirmed on his Twitter page that he was done with the company. AAA later vacated his Cruiserweight Championship.

On September 26, 2009, at Heroes Inmortales III Konnan kidnapped AAA owner Dorian Roldán and on the October 17 tapings of AAA's television show offered to return him if his father Joaquín reinstated Alex Koslov. Later in the evening, during a match between Marco Corleone and Chessman, a masked man entered the ring and attacked Corleone. The masked man was caught and unmasked to reveal Koslov, whom Konnan then saved by threatening Dorian with violence if Koslov wasn't freed. After Koslov was reinstated he joined Konnan's La Legión Extranjera and at Rey de Reyes unsuccessfully challenged Extreme Tiger for the AAA Cruiserweight Championship. On June 2, 2010, Koslov teamed up with fellow La Legión member Christina Von Eerie to defeat Aero Star and Faby Apache to win the AAA World Mixed Tag Team Championship. On October 1 at Héroes Inmortales IV Koslov and Von Eerie lost the titles to Faby Apache and Pimpinela Escarlata. Afterwards Koslov announced that Héroes Inmortales IV had been his last night with AAA, before leaving for WWE.

=== Ring of Honor (2009, 2010, 2013) ===
In April 2009, Koslov made a couple of appearances for Ring of Honor (ROH) when they promoted a couple of shows in Houston, Texas. Koslov first worked a singles match, losing to Bryan Danielson on the April 3 show Supercard of Honor IV. The following day at the tapings of the Take No Prisoners pay-per-view, Koslov was defeated by Roderick Strong in another singles match. Koslov returned to ROH in December 2009, losing to The Briscoe Brothers and Rocky Romero in a six-man tag team match, where he teamed with Davey Richards and Eddie Edwards, on the 18 and to Romero in a singles match on the 19 at Final Battle 2009, ROH's first live pay-per-view. Due to the controversy surrounding the Final Battle 2009 match, Koslov and Romero were booked in a rematch on March 26, 2010, in Phoenix, Arizona, which Koslov won.

On March 2, 2013, Koslov and Romero, now working together as a tag team, returned to ROH at the 11th Anniversary Show, where they were defeated by The American Wolves (Davey Richards and Eddie Edwards). The following day, they unsuccessfully challenged reDRagon (Bobby Fish and Kyle O'Reilly) for the ROH World Tag Team Championship. Koslov and Romero returned to ROH on July 27 and defeated reDRagon in a rematch to become the new ROH World Tag Team Champions. They lost the title to The American Wolves in their first defense on August 3. On September 20 at Death Before Dishonor XI, Koslov and Romero successfully defended the IWGP Junior Heavyweight Tag Team Championship against The American Wolves. At the following day's tapings of Ring of Honor Wrestling, Koslov and Romero unsuccessfully challenged reDRagon for the ROH World Tag Team Championship in a three-way match, which also included C&C Wrestle Factory (Caprice Coleman and Cedric Alexander).

=== World Wrestling Entertainment / WWE (2010–2012) ===
On the August 27, 2010, edition of World Wrestling Entertainment's SmackDown television program, Koslov, using the ring name Cárlos Sanchez, wrestled in a match, where he was defeated by Alberto Del Rio. It was later reported that Koslov had signed a developmental contract with the WWE and would report to their developmental territory, Florida Championship Wrestling in October 2010, when his AAA contract would expire.

Sherman, using his real name, made his FCW debut on November 20, 2010, at a house show in Punta Gorda, Florida in a losing effort against Bo Rotundo. Sherman made his televised debut on the November 28 edition of FCW TV, wrestling under the ring name Peter Orlov in a match, where he and AJ were defeated by Lucky Cannon and Naomi. On February 3, 2012, it was reported that Sherman had been released from his FCW contract.

=== Return to the independent circuit (2012–2015) ===
Sherman made his first post-WWE appearance on March 4, 2012, when he, once again performing as Alex Koslov, defeated SoCal Crazy at an Empire Wrestling Federation event in Covina, California. On March 17, Koslov returned to Pro Wrestling Guerrilla, losing to Kyle O'Reilly.

From January 24 to 25, 2015, Koslov participated in the Alternative Wrestling Show's Race for the Ring Tag Team Tournament with Romero. They were defeated in the finals by the ASW Tag team Champions PPRay (Peter Avalon and Ray Rosas). It was his final wrestling match. Following the match, Sherman stated that it was "absolutely necessary" for him to step away from professional wrestling and that he did not know if he would wrestle again.

=== New Japan Pro Wrestling (2012–2015) ===
On April 16, Koslov was announced as a participant in New Japan Pro-Wrestling's (NJPW) 2012 Best of the Super Juniors tournament. In the round-robin stage of the tournament, which ran from May 27 to June 9, Koslov won five out of his eight matches, but a loss to Low Ki in his final round-robin match caused him to narrowly miss advancing to the semifinals of the tournament. Koslov returned to New Japan on July 7, now representing the promotion's top villainous stable, Chaos, as a member of which he also reunited with former AAA partner Rocky Romero, with the two dubbing their tag team "Forever Hooligans". On July 22, Koslov and Romero defeated Jyushin Thunder Liger and Tiger Mask to win the IWGP Junior Heavyweight Tag Team Championship. Koslov and Romero made their first successful title defense on August 26 at a Sacramento Wrestling Federation (SWF) event in Gridley, California, defeating the team of A.J. Kirsch and Alex Shelley. Forever Hooligans made their second successful title defense on October 8 at King of Pro-Wrestling, defeating the Time Splitters (Alex Shelley and Kushida). On October 21, Forever Hooligans entered the 2012 Super Jr. Tag Tournament, defeating Jyushin Thunder Liger and Tiger Mask in their first round match. On November 2, Koslov and Romero were eliminated from the tournament in the semifinals by Apollo 55 (Prince Devitt and Ryusuke Taguchi). On November 11 at Power Struggle, Forever Hooligans lost the IWGP Junior Heavyweight Tag Team Championship to the winners of the Super Jr. Tag Tournament, the Time Splitters, ending their reign at 112 days. Koslov returned to New Japan in early 2013, and on February 10 at The New Beginning, he and Romero unsuccessfully challenged the Time Splitters for the IWGP Junior Heavyweight Tag Team Championship. On May 3 at Wrestling Dontaku 2013, Koslov and Romero regained the IWGP Junior Heavyweight Tag Team Championship from the Time Splitters. From late May to early June, Koslov took part in the 2013 Best of the Super Juniors, where he won four of his eight matches with a loss to Brian Kendrick in his final round-robin match on June 6 costing him a spot in the semifinals. Koslov and Romero made their first successful defense of the IWGP Junior Heavyweight Tag Team Championship on June 22 at Dominion 6.22 in a rematch with the Time Splitters. Koslov and Romero then got involved in Chaos' rivalry with the Suzuki-gun stable, which led to their second successful title defense on July 20 against Taichi and Taka Michinoku. Koslov and Romero lost the title to Taichi and Michinoku in a rematch on October 14 at King of Pro-Wrestling. For the first half of 2014, Forever Hooligans received several new shots at the title, now held by The Young Bucks (Matt and Nick Jackson), but were defeated each time, including in a three-way match, also involving the Time Splitters, on May 10 at Global Wars, a special event co-produced by NJPW and ROH in Toronto. Later in the month, Koslov was scheduled to take part in the 2014 Best of the Super Juniors, but after dislocating his left shoulder in his first match, he was forced to pull out of the tournament.

On January 4, 2015, at Wrestle Kingdom 9 in Tokyo Dome, Forever Hooligans challenged for the IWGP Junior Heavyweight Tag Team Championship, but were defeated by the defending champions, reDRagon, in a four-way match, also involving Time Splitters and The Young Bucks. After he and Romero lost to reDRagon in a non-title match the following day, Koslov took a victory lap around the ring and thanked Romero for sharing his career with for the past decade. On January 9, Koslov announced he was taking an "indefinite sabbatical" from professional wrestling until 2022.

=== Return to NJPW (2020–present) ===
After a 5-year hiatus, Koslov made his return to New Japan Pro Wrestling on August 7, 2020, as a color commentator on New Japan Cup USA alongside Kevin Kelly. Koslov would then become a regular commentator for New Japan Pro Wrestling alongside Kelley on the NJPW weekly series NJPW Strong. On October 28, 2022, on New Japan Pro Wrestling Rumble on 44th Street Koslov came out of retirement for one night only to wrestle one more time with fellow tag team partner Rocky Romero in a brief reunion of the Forever Hooligans in a losing effort against The DKC and Kevin Knight.

== Championships and accomplishments ==
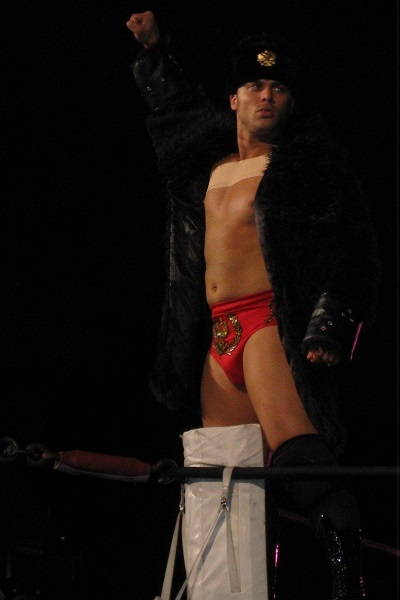
Koslov in September 2014.

- AAA
  - AAA Cruiserweight Championship (2 times)
  - AAA World Mixed Tag Team Championship (1 time) – with Christina Von Eerie
- New Japan Pro-Wrestling
  - IWGP Junior Heavyweight Tag Team Championship (2 times) – with Rocky Romero
- NWA UK Hammerlock
  - NWA British Commonwealth Heavyweight Championship (1 time)
- Pro Wrestling Illustrated
  - PWI ranked him #114 of the top 500 singles wrestlers in the PWI 500 in 2014
- Ring of Honor
  - ROH World Tag Team Championship (1 time) – with Rocky Romero
- Toryumon Mexico
  - Suzuki Cup (2008) – with Marco Corleone and Ultimo Dragon
