= NWA United Kingdom Heavyweight Championship =

Professional wrestling championship

Details
- Promotion: NWA UK Hammerlock
- Date established: November 2, 2001
- Current champion: Phil Boyd
- Date won: November 10, 2012
Statistics
- First champion: Gary Steele
- Most reigns: Johnny Moss (6 times)
- Longest reign: Phil Boyd (4,561+ days)
- Shortest reign: Son Of Abdullah / Jake Roberts (1 day)

The NWA United Kingdom Heavyweight Championship is a professional wrestling championship in the NWA UK Hammerlock promotion. The championship has existed since 2001.

== Title history ==
#	Order in reign history
Reign	The reign number for the specific set of wrestlers listed
Event	The event in which the title was won
—	Used for vacated reigns so as not to count it as an official reign
N/A	The information is not available or is unknown
+	Indicates the current reign is changing daily

#	Wrestler	Reign	Date	Days held	Location	Event	Notes
1	Gary Steele	1	November 2, 2001	100	Telford, Shropshire		Defeated Johnny Moss in a tournament final to become the inaugural champion.
2	Johnny Moss	1	February 10, 2002	115	Herne Bay, Kent		
3	Tony McMillan	1	June 5, 2002	2	Hertford, Hertfordshire		
4	Johnny Moss	2	June 7, 2002	134	Maidstone, Kent		
5	Jake Roberts	1	October 19, 2002	1	Maidstone, Kent	NWA UK-Hammerlock; Live Event	
6	Johnny Moss	3	October 20, 2002	0 – 72	Ashford, Kent	NWA UK-Hammerlock; Live Event	
—	Vacated	—	2002	—	N/A	N/A	
7	Hugh Mungus	1	October 19, 2004	6	Margate, Kent	NWA UK-Hammerlock; Live Event	Defeated Exodus for the vacant title.
8	Paul Tracey	1	October 25, 2004	4	Hertford, Hertfordshire	NWA UK-Hammerlock; Live Event	
9	Son of Abdullah	1	October 29, 2004	1	Maidstone, Kent NWA UK-Hammerlock; Live Event		
—	Vacated	—	October 30, 2004	—	N/A	N/A	Title stripped when Paul Tracey and Fergal Devitt complained to NWA UK Hammerlock that Son of Abdullah would be out of the country for 30 days and unable to defend the title.
10	Johnny Moss	4	October 31, 2004	334	Rugby, Warwickshire	NWA UK-Hammerlock; Live Event	Defeated Fergal Devitt to win the vacant title.
11	Paul Tracey	2	September 30, 2005	18	Kilcoole, Wicklow, Ireland		
12	Johnny Moss	5	October 18, 2005	121	Bray, Wicklow, Ireland		
13	Dan Severn	1	February 16, 2006	2	Grays, Essex	NWA UK-Hammerlock; Live Event	
14	Johnny Moss	6	February 18, 2006	392	Maidstone, Kent	NWA UK-Hammerlock; Live Event	
15	Conscience	1	March 17, 2007	427	Bellshill, North Lanarkshire, Scotland	SWA Clan Wars III	
—	Vacated	—	May 17, 2008	—	Bellshill, North Lanarkshire, Scotland	SWA Battlezone IV: Interesting Times	During the Event, Draveryn reemerged as commissioner of the Scottish Wrestling Alliance and outed Charles Boddington as fraud. Following this, all championships were vacated and immediately contested later that evening.
16	Conscience	2	May 17, 2008	119	Bellshill, North Lanarkshire, Scotland	SWA Battlezone IV: Interesting Times	Defeated Lionheart in a Ladder match for the vacant title.
—	Vacated	—	September 13, 2008	—	N/A	N/A	
17	Gary Lagden	1	February 20, 2011	147	Corringham, Essex		Defeated Tony McMillan for the vacant title.
18	Kurupt	1	July 17, 2011	321	Corringham, Essex	NWA UK-Hammerlock; Live Event	Defeated Gary Lagden and Will Harper in a three-way match.
19	Lee Walker	1	October 28, 2011	2	Tonbridge, Kent	NWA World Title Tour – Day 1	
20	Kurupt	2	October 30, 2011	216	Pitsea, Essex	NWA World Title Tour – Day 2	
21	Danny Garnell	1	June 2, 2012	161	Tonbridge, Kent	NWA UK-Hammerlock; 2nd Annual Andre Baker Memorial Show	
22	Phil Boyd	1	November 10, 2012	4,561+	Tonbridge, Kent	NWA UK-Hammerlock; Live Event	

== See also ==
- Professional wrestling in the United Kingdom
- Professional wrestling promotions in the United Kingdom
