= Jimena Sánchez =

Mexican sports journalist and model

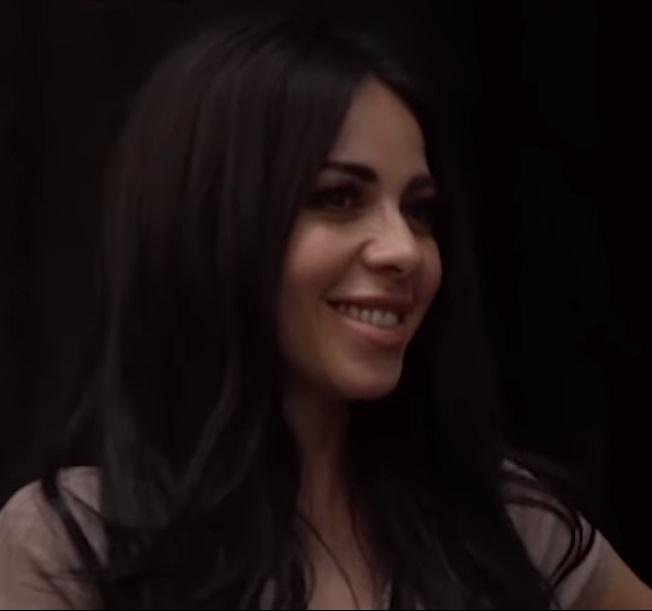
- Sánchez in 2018
- Born: Jimena Sánchez Mejía Reyes; September 28, 1984 (age 42); Mexico City, Mexico
- Occupations: Sports journalist; television host; model; actress
- Years active: 2008 - present
- Television: Lo Mejor de Fox Sports; MLB en FOX; WWE Saturday Night
- Spouse: Tis Zombie (m. 2021)
- Modeling information
- Hair color: Black
- Eye color: Brown

Jimena V. Sánchez (born Jimena Sánchez Mejía Reyes; 28 September 1984) is a Mexican sports journalist, television host and model. She is signed to Fox Sports Mexico and Fox Deportes, where she is best known for anchoring the programs Lo Mejor de Fox Sports and WWE Saturday Night. She is the current host of AEW All Elite Show on Fox Sports Mexico.

== Early life ==
Jimena Sánchez Mejía Reyes was born on 28 September 1984 in Mexico City. She was raised in Veracruz on the Gulf of Mexico. After a decade of living in Veracruz, she moved back to Mexico City to study acting at a university. She ultimately left the university without finishing her degree.

== Career ==
In 2008, Sánchez started a modeling blog with her best friend called Mad Mamacitas. The blog featured seductive photos of Sánchez and her friends, and went viral online. After the blog was launched, she started working for the Mexican sports magazine RÉCORD, and the sports website Medio Tiempo as a writer. She posted weekly columns and video blogs that soon got the attention of Fox Sports.

Sánchez was signed to Fox Sports Latin America in 2011. She began hosting the sports entertainment program Fox Para Todos. She currently hosts the sports entertainment program Lo Mejor de Fox Sports, and the wrestling news program WWE Saturday Night alongside Vero Rodríguez. Through WWE Saturday Night, she has covered several editions of Wrestlemania, Summerslam, Monday Night Raw, SmackDown, and live events across Mexico.

In addition to covering World Wrestling Entertainment, Sánchez also covers the National Football League and the Major League Baseball for Fox Sports Mexico. In 2019, she started hosting Thursday Night Football segments for the football news program Fox Impacto NFL. She also hosts the baseball news program MLB en FOX. She has covered several editions of the Super Bowl and the World Series.

== Other ventures ==
Sánchez has been featured in numerous magazines, including SoHo, Open, ElHartista, and on multiple covers of EstiloDF. In September 2019, she was featured on the cover of that month's issue of Maxim Mexico.

Sánchez played Mayte Cedeño in the HBO Latin America drama Capadocia in 2008. She appeared in three episodes of the series. She also played Karla in the drama film Pelea de Gallos.

Sánchez identifies as a feminist. In 2017, she helped launch Versus, a non-profit, non-government organization, co-founded by her colleague Marion Reimers, devoted to combating gender, racial, and class discrimination in sports journalism. Sánchez was featured in the organization's video launch alongside Reimers and Vero Rodríguez, as they show how they're met with a string of harmful and sexist messages on their social media account because of their role as women in sports.

== Personal life ==
Sánchez is a fan of the Las Vegas Raiders, and a supporter of Liga MX football club Guadalajara. She is also a fan of the Los Angeles Lakers and the New York Yankees. She is a practicing Christian, and has several tattoos dedicated to her religion.

On 1 October 2021, after some speculation, Sánchez revealed that she married singer-songwriter Tis Zombie. The couple began their relationship in February of the same year.

== Coverage ==
Sánchez has covered the following events and leagues for Fox Sports Mexico:

- NFL draft (2020)
- MLB All-Star Game (2019)
- World Series (2019, 2020, 2021)
- Super Bowl (50, LI, LII, LIII, LIV)
- WWE Wrestlemania (32, 33, 34, 35, 36, 37)
- WWE Summerslam (2016, 2017, 2018, 2019, 2020)
- AEW All In: Texas (2025)

== Filmography ==
=== Film ===
Year	Title	Role
2008	Pelea de Gallos	Karla

=== Television ===
Year	Title	Role	Notes
2008	Capadocia	Matye Cedeño	3 episodes
