= Vero Rodríguez =

Mexican sports journalist (born 1987)

- Born: Verónica Rodríguez Cuesta; 26 March 1987 (age 39); Mexico City, Mexico
- Other name: La Güera Cacahuetera
- Education: Universidad Iberoamericana
- Occupations: Sports journalist; television presenter
- Years active: 2007–present
- Employers: MVS Televisión (2010–2015); Fox Sports Mexico (2014–2021); Telemundo Deportes (2022–present)
- Spouse: Finn Bálor (m. 2019)

Verónica Rodríguez Cuesta (Note: In this Spanish name, the first or paternal surname is Rodríguez and the second or maternal family name is Cuesta.) (born 26 March 1987) is a Mexican sports journalist and television presenter. Nicknamed "La Güera" (the Blonde), she gained prominence for her work on Fox Sports Mexico from 2014 to 2021. Rodríguez is currently signed to Telemundo Deportes, where she earned two Sports Emmy Awards nominations as an anchor.

== Early life and education ==
Verónica Rodríguez Cuesta was born on 26 March 1987 in Mexico City. As a child, she became deeply fascinated with sports and the emotions it evokes. She studied communications at Universidad Iberoamericana and graduated with honors in 2006.

== Career ==
=== Early career ===
Rodríguez began her career as a student reporter for her university's sports program after she was invited to join by a classmate, who was a producer. After receiving her bachelor's degree, she worked for MVS Televisión, where she co-hosted the program Locas por el Fútbol. She also contributed to the sports website MedioTiempo.

=== Fox Sports Mexico (2014–2021) ===
Rodríguez was signed to Fox Sports Mexico in 2014. It took three years for the network to sign her after she completed several auditions and meetings with the producers. She started her tenure by hosting the sports entertainment program Fox Para Todos and La Previa del fin de Semana, which were previews of upcoming Pachuca and León matches. She also became a sideline reporter for Liga MX and Liga MX Feminil matches. In 2016, Rodríguez covered the Summer Olympics and the UEFA Champions League Final. The following year, she hosted the sports entertainment program Lo Mejor de Fox Sports, and the wrestling news program WWE Saturday Night alongside Jimena Sánchez. Through the latter series, she covered several editions of Wrestlemania, SummerSlam, Monday Night Raw, and live events across Mexico.

In 2018, Rodríguez began anchoring Agenda Fox Sports, a morning sports news program that airs in Latin America on Fox Sports and in the United States on Fox Deportes. She then covered the 2019 UEFA Champions League Final. In addition to hosting programs and covering events for Fox Sports, Rodríguez was a Spanish broadcaster and ambassador for the English football club Wolverhampton Wanderers F.C. She also served as a reporter for Formula 1 and Formula E races.

Rodríguez announced that she would be taking a hiatus from Fox Sports in January 2020, as she was relocating from Mexico to the United States. Because of the COVID-19 pandemic, she was able to continue hosting her usual programs for a while at home. However, personal issues caused her to extend her hiatus. During her absence, she contributed to other sports websites, podcasts, and shows. Rodríguez returned to Fox Sports in May 2021, and was ultimately laid off in December.

=== Telemundo Deportes (2022–present) ===
Throughout 2022, Rodríguez worked on several sports properties for Telemundo Deportes. She was an interim host of its weekend late-night sports entertainment program Zona Mixta, where she covered events such as the 2022 FIFA World Cup and the 2023 FIFA Women's World Cup. Rodríguez was signed to Telemundo as a full-time host for Zona Mixta on 15 February 2024. In addition to her role, she also hosted the pre- and post-game shows for C.D. Guadalajara. On 3 March 2025, Rodríguez was named a co-host for El Pelotazo, Telemundo's daily late-night sports program "set to redefine Hispanic sports entertainment."

=== Other ventures ===
Rodríguez helped launch Versus, a non-profit, non-government organization, co-founded by Marion Reimers, devoted to combating gender, racial, and class discrimination in sports journalism. She has modeled for numerous publications, such as EstiloDF, NYLON Español, and Quien. In June 2019, she was featured in that month's issue of Maxim Mexico.

== Personal life ==
Rodríguez identifies as a feminist. She is an avid supporter of Club Universidad Nacional, and has credited the club for sparking her love for sports. She is also a supporter of Arsenal F.C. and Juventus FC. Her hobbies include surfing and photography.

On 19 August 2019, Rodríguez married Irish professional wrestler Fergal Devitt, better known as Finn Bálor, in a private ceremony in Tulum. They had confirmed their relationship in June that year, during an interview at the UEFA Champions League final, and Devitt proposed to Rodríguez the following day. They reside in Orlando, Florida.

== Coverage and accolades ==
Rodríguez has covered the following events and leagues for Fox Sports Mexico:

- Liga MX
- Liga MX Femenil
- Olympic Games (2016)
- Formula One (Mexican Grand Prix)
- WWE WrestleMania (32, 33, 34, 35)
- UEFA Champions League (2016, 2019)
- WWE SummerSlam (2016, 2017, 2018, 2019)

Awards and nominations
Award	Year	Work	Category	Result	Ref.
Sports Emmy Awards	2025	Juegos Olímpicos Paris 2024 (as host)	Outstanding Studio Show in Spanish	Nominated	
Sports Emmy Awards	2025	Zona Mixta (as host)	Outstanding Studio Show in Spanish	Nominated	
