= Marion Reimers =

Mexican sports journalist and analyst

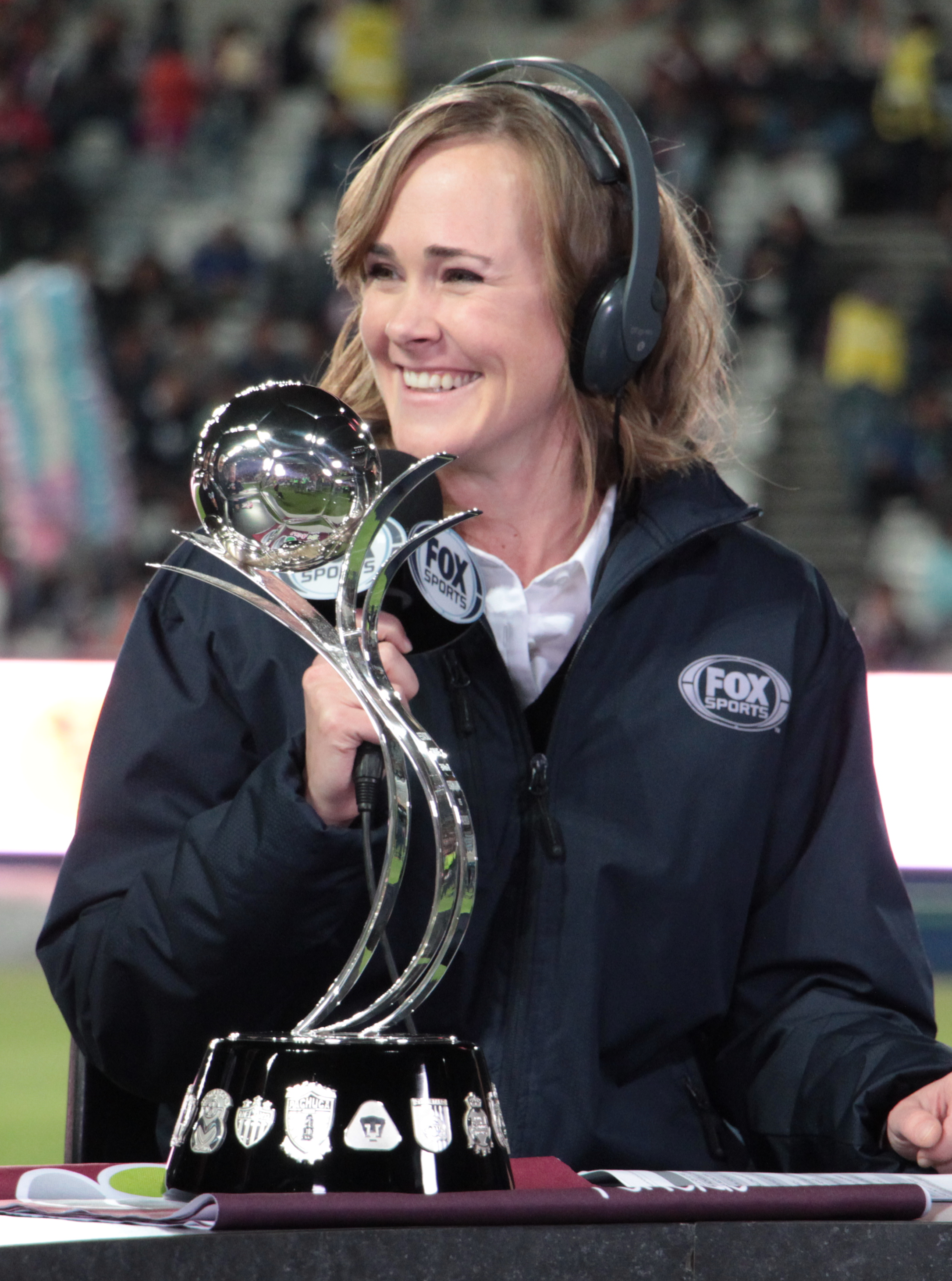
- Reimers in 2017
- Born: Marion Renate Reimers Tusche; 2 August 1985 (age 41); Mexico City, Mexico
- Other name: La Reimers
- Education: Tecnológico de Monterrey; Universidad Torcuato Di Tella
- Occupations: Sports journalist; analyst; television host
- Years active: 2006–present
- Television: Central Fox (2008–July 2021); Fox Sports Radio Mexico (2017–July 2021); TNT Sports Mexico (August 2021–present)

Academic work
- Institutions: Tecnológico de Monterrey de la Ciudad de Mexico

Marion Renate Reimers Tusche (Note: In this Spanish name, the first or paternal surname is Reimers and the second or maternal family name is Tusche.) (born 2 August 1985) is a Mexican sports journalist, analyst, and television host. She is currently signed to TNT Sports Mexico. She is best known for her tenure with Fox Sports Mexico and Fox Deportes, where she anchored the nightly sports news program Central Fox from 2008 to 2021. She is also the co-founder and president of the non-profit, non-government organization Versus.

== Early life and education ==
Marion Renate Reimers Tusche was born on 2 August 1985 in Mexico City. She is of German descent. She has played sports such as swimming, tennis, football and athletics since she was four years old, and was a karate national champion. She studied art history and photography in Florence, Italy, but later decided to study communications at the Monterrey Institute of Technology and Higher Education (ITESM) (Spanish: Tecnológico de Monterrey), where she graduated in 2010.

In 2014, Reimers earned a master's degree in journalism from the Universidad Torcuato di Tella in Argentina, in association with the newspaper La Nación.

== Career ==
Reimers began her career as an editor for the North Cone of Fox Sports Latin America in 2006. In 2007 she began her broadcasting career, first as a reporter and then as weekend anchor of Diario Fox Sports. In 2008 she became the main presenter of Central Fox sports news show which airs in Latin America on Fox Sports and in the United States on Fox Deportes. She has covered numerous events, including the Olympic Games in 2012 and 2016, FIFA World Cup in 2010, 2014, and 2018, UEFA Champions League in 2015, 2016 and 2019, and Copa Libertadores.

Reimers began calling Liga MX Femenil matches on Fox Sports Dos (Fox Sports 2) in Mexico as a match analyst (co-commentator) when the league was launched in July 2017. She became the lead play-by-play commentator (narradora principal) in July 2019.

Reimers was also the play-by-play commentator for 4 German Bundesliga men's matches on Fox Sports Mexico and Fox Sports Central America in May–June 2020 when the Bundesliga resumed play after a 2-month hiatus due to the COVID-19 pandemic.

As the play-by-play commentator, Reimers begins each fútbol match broadcast at the first half kickoff with her signature catch phase "Con el privilegio de estar siempre cerca del balón." (meaning "With the privilege of always being close to the ball.")

On 1 June 2019, Reimers became the first Hispanic woman to broadcast the UEFA Champions League Final, where she was a match analyst (co-commentator) on Fox Sports Mexico and Fox Sports Central America along with narrador (play-by-play commentator) Ricardo Murguía and match analyst Eduardo Biscayart.

On 4 August 2021, Reimers announced that she had left Fox Sports Mexico and Fox Deportes after fifteen years to join WarnerMedia's TNT Sports Mexico, where she will continue to broadcast men's UEFA Champions League matches and finals.

== Other ventures ==
=== Academia ===
Reimers is an adjunct professor of journalism at the Mexico City campus of the Monterrey Institute of Technology and Higher Education (ITESM) (Spanish: Tecnológico de Monterrey de la Ciudad de Mexico).

=== Business ===
In May 2021, Reimers and her former partner Leonora Milán joined the minority investor group of National Women's Soccer League team Washington Spirit.

=== Philanthropy ===
Reimers identifies as a feminist. In 2017, she co-founded Versus, a non-profit, non-government organization devoted to bringing public awareness and combating gender, racial, and class discrimination in sports journalism. She also serves as the organization's president. The organization launched with a viral video on YouTube featuring Reimers, Vero Rodríguez and Jimena Sánchez. The video shows how they are met with harmful, violent and misogynistic comments because of their role as women in sports.

Reimers was named "goodwill ambassador" by the United Nations Organization for Women on 21 October 2021.

=== Writing ===
Reimers has contributed to publications such as La Nación and The New York Times. Her first book, ¡Juega como niña! (Play like a Girl!), was published on 16 April 2021.

== Personal life ==
Reimers identifies as being part of the LGBTQ+ community. In 2012, she moved to Buenos Aires, Argentina, as part of an employment exchange with the South Cone of Fox Sports Latin America while she studied for her master's degree. She is fluent in Spanish, English, German, and Italian. Her hobbies include reading, photography, and music.

== Coverage ==
Reimers has covered the following events and leagues for Fox Sports Mexico:

- Liga MX
- Bundesliga
- Liga MX Feminil
- Copa Libertadores
- Copa América (2011)
- Pan American Games (2011)
- Olympic Games (2012, 2016)
- FIFA World Cup (2010, 2014, 2018)
- UEFA Champions League (2015, 2019, 2021)

== Publications ==
- ¡Juega como niña! (Editorial Planeta Mexicana, 16 April 2021, ISBN 978-607-07-6808-8)

== Awards ==
In 2008, Reimers was awarded the Medal of Merit in Communications and Journalism in Mexico. In 2012, she was awarded the "Female Revelation in Sports Journalism" award by the Higher Institute of Sports Journalism in Buenos Aires.

In 2015, Reimers became the first Mexican woman to be nominated for a Sports Emmy Award in the United States. She was nominated for Outstanding On-Air Sports Personality in Spanish.
