= Finn Bálor =

Irish professional wrestler (born 1981)

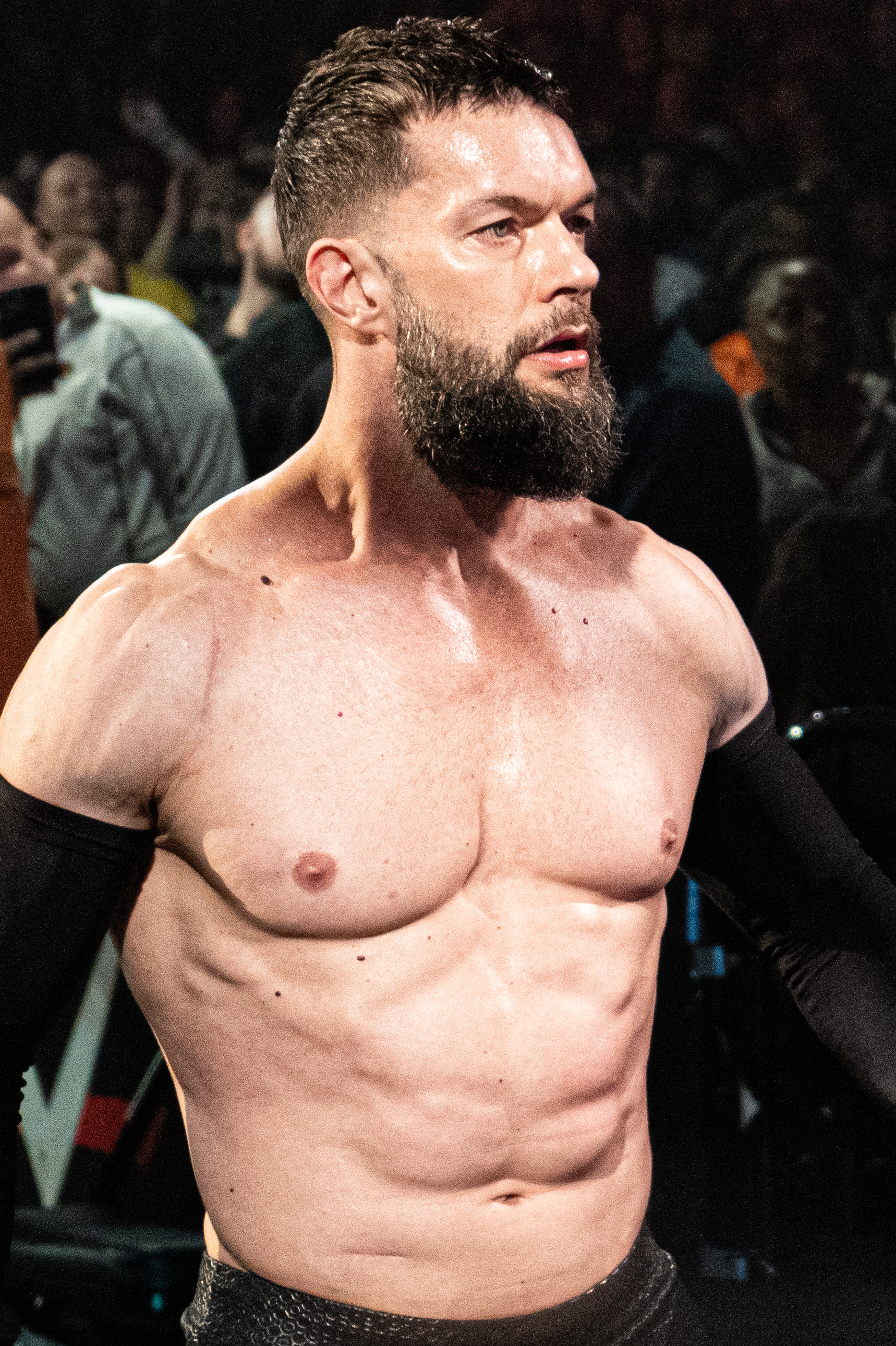
- Bálor in 2024

Personal information
- Born: Fergal Devitt; 25 July 1981 (age 45) Bray, County Wicklow, Ireland
- Spouse: Vero Rodríguez (m. 2019)

Professional wrestling career
- Ring names: C.T.U Ranger Red (II); Fergal Devitt; ”The Demon”; Finn Bálor; Pegasus Kid (II); Prince Devitt
- Billed height: 5 ft 11 in (180 cm)
- Billed weight: 190 lb (86 kg)
- Billed from: Bray, County Wicklow, Ireland
- Trained by: New Japan Inoki Dojo; NWA UK Hammerlock
- Debut: 23 November 2001

Fergal Devitt (born 25 July 1981) is an Irish professional wrestler. As of May 2014, he is signed to WWE, where he performs on the SmackDown brand under the ring name Finn Bálor (/ˈbælər/).

Devitt began his career in 2001, before becoming widely known for his tenure with New Japan Pro-Wrestling (NJPW), under the ring name Prince Devitt. Within the promotion, he is a three-time IWGP Junior Heavyweight Champion and six-time IWGP Junior Heavyweight Tag Team Champion, having held the title twice with Minoru and four times with Ryusuke Taguchi. He is also a two-time winner of the Best of the Super Juniors tournament, having won in 2010 and 2013, as well as being a founding member and the original leader of the Bullet Club stable. Through NJPW's working relationship with Mexican promotion Consejo Mundial de Lucha Libre (CMLL), Devitt also wrestled there, becoming a one-time NWA World Historic Middleweight Champion. He also wrestled for a number of independent promotions, becoming a one-time ICW Zero-G Champion, one-time RPW British Cruiserweight Champion and a two-time NWA British Commonwealth Heavyweight Champion.

After signing with WWE's developmental system, NXT, and adopting his current ring name, Bálor won the NXT Championship, with his 292-day reign being the longest in the championship's history until March 2020. Also during his time in NXT, Bálor became the first co-winner of the inaugural Dusty Rhodes Tag Team Classic with Samoa Joe. Shortly after arriving on the main roster, Bálor became the first wrestler in WWE history to win a world title in their pay-per-view debut, by becoming the inaugural WWE Universal Champion at SummerSlam 2016. Bálor is also a two-time Intercontinental Champion and a one-time United States Champion. Bálor became a Grand Slam Champion on September 2, 2023, at Payback, winning the Undisputed WWE Tag Team Championship, and is an overall six-time Tag Team Champion in WWE.

== Early life ==
Fergal Devitt was born on 25 July 1981 in Bray, County Wicklow, the son of Leonie and Fintan Devitt. He has one older sibling and three younger siblings. He attended St. Cronan's School in Bray. Before deciding to become a professional wrestler, he played association football and Gaelic football. While growing up, he enjoyed watching World of Sport and WWF (now WWE) shows and was a fan of The British Bulldogs, Shawn Michaels, Mr. Perfect, Rick Rude, Savio Vega, and Koko B. Ware.

In a 2026 interview with Chris Van Vliet, he mentioned that he, at the age of 16, worked at a cleaning contracting company where his uncle worked in the maintenance department. There he repaired floor buffers. In the same interview, he mentioned that he had worked at Tesco and at a railway in Ireland where his family worked, as a seller of tickets.

== Professional wrestling career ==
=== National Wrestling Alliance (2001–2007) ===
After training at NWA UK Hammerlock, Devitt made his professional wrestling debut on 23 November 2001. He quickly won the NWA British Commonwealth Heavyweight Championship. After graduating, his wrestling career started quickly, and he began touring Ireland, the United Kingdom, and the United States. In mid-2002, Devitt, along with Paul Tracey, opened NWA Ireland, his own wrestling promotion based in Ireland. The promotion soon became the sister group of NWA UK Hammerlock as both promoted under the NWA banner. As part of NWA Ireland, Devitt trained future WWE competitor Becky Lynch, future European Heavyweight Champion and ICW Zero-G Champion Andy Roberts and future NXT Cruiserweight Champion Jordan Devlin.

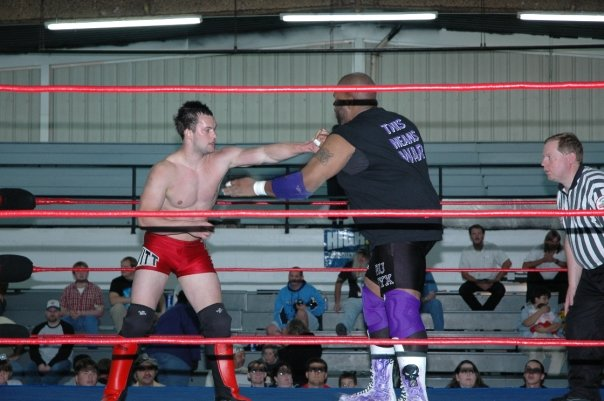
Devitt squaring off with Dru Onyx in 2004

On 8 October 2005, in Nashville, Tennessee, at the NWA 57th Anniversary Show, Devitt defeated Dru Onyx for his second British Commonwealth title. After the match both participants were invited to the New Japan Inoki Dojo in Santa Monica, California, to train. During late 2005, Devitt also began competing for the U.S.–based Millennium Wrestling Federation (MWF). He made his debut in a triple threat match at Soul Survivor III on 5 November, challenging for the MWF Television Championship against the champion Eddie Edwards and R. J. Brewer. He made his television debut on the November edition of MWF Ultra, in a match against Osiris. After impressing many promoters and trainers, he was invited to train in New Japan's main dojo in Tokyo, where, in early 2006, he began training in the Japanese style of professional wrestling. He lost the British Commonwealth Championship to Karl Anderson in March 2006.

In June 2007, Devitt participated in a tournament for the National Wrestling Alliance (NWA) called "Reclaiming the Glory", which was to crown a new NWA World Heavyweight Champion. The championship had been controlled by Total Nonstop Action Wrestling (TNA) for several years, but in 2007 NWA had terminated its agreement with TNA. In the first round, Devitt defeated Australian wrestler Mikey Nicholls, but lost in the second round to Bryan Danielson.

=== New Japan Pro-Wrestling (2006–2014) ===
==== Control Terrorism Unit; RISE (2006–2008) ====
The day after losing the British Commonwealth Championship, Devitt signed a contract with New Japan Pro-Wrestling (NJPW) in March 2006. In April 2006, he made his NJPW debut against El Samurai, using the ring name Prince Devitt. Devitt later stated in an interview with PowerSlam Mag that New Japan renamed him Prince Devitt because nobody Japanese could pronounce his actual name. He was originally going to be called King David until people started questioning why the 24-year-old would be a king already. Eventually, Simon Inoki came up with the name Prince Devitt, which Devitt himself also preferred. In May 2006, New Japan started holding brand–exclusive events, and Devitt was assigned to the Wrestle Land brand, debuting under a mask as the second Pegasus Kid, which led to comparisons between Devitt and the original Pegasus Kid, Chris Benoit.

During his tour of New Japan in late August and early September, he started competing again as his Prince Devitt identity, utilizing an Irish superstar gimmick. He eventually turned heel and started teaming with the Control Terrorism Unit (CTU) in an apprentice–type role. While teaming with CTU, he began a losing streak, aggravating his teammates to such a degree that they did not want anything to do with him anymore. This led to him being given one final chance on 6 October, where he rose to the occasion and impressed his CTU teammates enough to continue his association with them. To solidify his status with the stable, Devitt teamed with CTU leader, Jushin Thunder Liger to take on Wataru Inoue and Ryusuke Taguchi. In a huge twist, Devitt was the one to make the final cover on Inoue following a stiff brainbuster. From then on he was officially recognized as a member of the CTU.

His momentum was halted in January 2007, when he suffered a serious knee injury, sidelining him from in-ring action in New Japan until early May of that year. Following the injury, he returned to action, showing great improvement and was touted by fellow CTU teammate, Minoru, as the future winner of the 2007 Best of the Super Juniors tournament. However, when the tournament was held in June 2007, Devitt scored no points and was eliminated early from the competition. Following the folding of CTU in August 2007, Devitt and Minoru joined the new RISE stable, forming a tag team named "Prince Prince", a reference to both Devitt's ring name and Minoru's nickname, "Black Prince". In November 2007, TNA made a tour of Japan, during which Devitt and Minoru were defeated by TNA wrestlers Senshi and Christopher Daniels.

On 27 January 2008, Devitt and Minoru won the IWGP Junior Heavyweight Tag Team Championship, this served as Devitt's first major tag title reign. They lost the championship to Akira and Jyushin Thunder Liger in February, before regaining the title on 21 July. After a near three-month reign they lost the championship to No Limit (Tetsuya Naito and Yujiro) in October.

==== Apollo 55 (2009–2013) ====
Devitt teamed with Ryusuke Taguchi as Apollo 55 (アポロ・ゴー・ゴー, Aporo Gō Gō) and on 5 July 2009 at Circuit 2009 New Japan Soul they defeated The Motor City Machine Guns (Alex Shelley and Chris Sabin) to win the IWGP Junior Heavyweight Tag Team Championship. On 30 May, Devitt entered the 2009 Best of the Super Juniors tournament. After winning his block in the round-robin stage of the tournament, Devitt advanced to the semifinals, where he defeated Kota Ibushi. In the end, Devitt was defeated in the finals of the tournament by Koji Kanemoto. In December, Devitt entered the 2009 Super J-Cup. After defeating Atsushi Aoki, Danshoku Dino and Yamato, Devitt was once again defeated in the finals of the tournament, this time by Naomichi Marufuji. On 4 January 2010, at Wrestle Kingdom IV in Tokyo Dome, Devitt and Taguchi successfully defended the IWGP Junior Heavyweight Tag Team Championship against Averno and Último Guerrero. On 21 April, Devitt and Taguchi were stripped of the title, after not defending them for 30 days. On 8 May, the two entered the Super J Tag Tournament in an attempt to regain the championship, but were defeated in the finals by the team of El Samurai and Koji Kanemoto.

On 30 May, Devitt entered the 2010 Best of the Super Juniors tournament and two weeks later finished second in his block with five victories, advancing to the semifinals of the tournament. On 13 June, Devitt first defeated Taiji Ishimori in the semifinals and then Kota Ibushi in the finals to win the tournament and earn a shot at Naomichi Marufuji's IWGP Junior Heavyweight Championship. On 19 June at Dominion 6.19, Devitt defeated Marufuji to win the IWGP Junior Heavyweight Championship for the first time. Eleven days later, Devitt, Taguchi and Hirooki Goto won the J Sports Crown Openweight 6 Man Tag Tournament, defeating Hiroshi Tanahashi, TAJIRI and Kushida in the finals. Devitt made his first successful Junior Heavyweight Championship title defense on 11 July, defeating Pro Wrestling Noah's Atsushi Aoki. Just over a week later, on 19 July, Devitt and Taguchi defeated Koji Kanemoto and El Samurai to win the IWGP Junior Heavyweight Tag Team Championship for the second time as a team. In August Devitt entered New Japan's biggest tournament of the year, the G1 Climax, as a substitute for the injured Naomichi Marufuji. Devitt managed to win four out of his seven matches in the round-robin stage of the tournament, including a major victory over former four-time IWGP Heavyweight Champion Hiroshi Tanahashi, but finished fifth in his block and missed advancing to the finals by a single point. On 3 September, Devitt made his second successful defense of the IWGP Junior Heavyweight Championship, defeating DDT Pro-Wrestling representative Kenny Omega, that he won on 11 November 2012. Omega and Kota Ibushi, the team known collectively as the Golden☆Lovers, came back on 11 October at Destruction '10 and defeated Devitt and Taguchi to win the IWGP Junior Heavyweight Tag Team Championship.

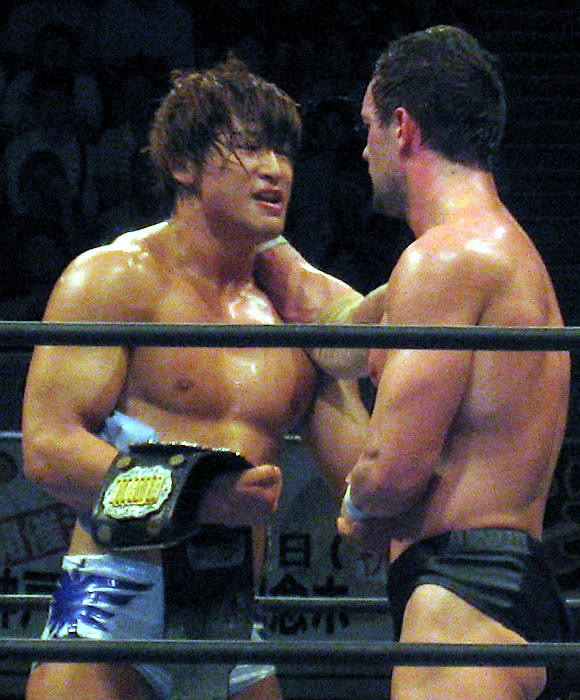
Devitt after losing the IWGP Junior Heavyweight Championship to Kota Ibushi at Dominion 6.18

On 11 December, Devitt made his third successful IWGP Junior Heavyweight Championship defense, defeating another New Japan outsider, Davey Richards. On 4 January 2011, at Wrestle Kingdom V in Tokyo Dome, Devitt successfully defended the IWGP Junior Heavyweight Championship against Kota Ibushi, avenging the loss from the IWGP Junior Heavyweight Tag Team Championship match. On 23 January at Fantastica Mania 2011, a New Japan and Consejo Mundial de Lucha Libre (CMLL) co–promoted event in Tokyo, Devitt and Taguchi defeated Kenny Omega and Kota Ibushi to regain the IWGP Junior Heavyweight Tag Team Championship, making Devitt a double IWGP champion for the second time. Devitt continued his streak of defending the IWGP Junior Heavyweight Championship against New Japan outsiders, when he successfully defended the title against Taka Michinoku on 20 February and Kushida on 19 March. In May, Devitt took part in the Invasion Tour 2011, New Japan's first tour of the United States, during which he successfully defended the IWGP Junior Heavyweight Championship against Low Ki on 14 May in New York City and the IWGP Junior Heavyweight Tag Team Championship against the Strong Style Thugz (Homicide and Low Ki) on 15 May in Philadelphia, Pennsylvania. On 26 May, Devitt entered the 2011 Best of the Super Juniors tournament. After losing his opening match against Davey Richards, Devitt went on a seven match winning streak to finish first in his block in the round-robin stage of the tournament. On 10 June, Devitt was eliminated from the tournament in the semifinals by his own tag team partner, Ryusuke Taguchi. On 18 June at Dominion 6.18, Devitt lost the IWGP Junior Heavyweight Championship to Best of the Super Juniors winner, Kota Ibushi, ending his reign at 364 days.

On 23 June, Devitt, Taguchi and Hirooki Goto won their second J Sports Crown Openweight 6 Man Tag Tournament in a row by defeating the team of Giant Bernard, Jushin Thunder Liger and Karl Anderson in the finals of the three-day-long tournament. On 24 July, Devitt received his rematch for the IWGP Junior Heavyweight Championship at Ryōgoku Peter Pan 2011, but was unable to regain the title from Ibushi. This led to a match on 14 August, where Apollo 55 successfully defended the IWGP Junior Heavyweight Tag Team Championship against the Golden☆Lovers. On 11 September, Apollo 55 defeated Taichi and Taka Michinoku to make their seventh successful IWGP Junior Heavyweight Tag Team Championship defense, breaking the record for most defenses during a single reign. When Kota Ibushi was forced to vacate the IWGP Junior Heavyweight Championship after dislocating his left shoulder, Devitt, as the previous champion, was ushered into a decision match to determine a new champion. On 19 September, Devitt defeated Kushida to win the IWGP Junior Heavyweight Championship for the second time. On 10 October at Destruction '11, Devitt and Taguchi lost the IWGP Junior Heavyweight Tag Team Championship to the No Remorse Corps (Davey Richards and Rocky Romero). Devitt made the first successful title defense of his second IWGP Junior Heavyweight Championship reign on 12 November at Power Struggle, defeating Taka Michinoku, and followed that up by defeating the man who had pinned him for the IWGP Junior Heavyweight Tag Team Championship, Davey Richards, in his second defense on 4 December. On 23 December, Devitt defeated the other half of No Remorse Corps, Rocky Romero, to make his third IWGP Junior Heavyweight Championship defense. On 4 January 2012 at Wrestle Kingdom VI in Tokyo Dome, Devitt and Taguchi defeated Richards and Romero to once again regain the IWGP Junior Heavyweight Tag Team Championship, starting Devitt's record-breaking sixth reign as one half of the champions. On 12 February at The New Beginning, Apollo 55 lost the IWGP Junior Heavyweight Tag Team Championship back to the No Remorse Corps in their first defense. This led to a match on 10 March, where Devitt defeated Davey Richards to make his fourth successful defense of the IWGP Junior Heavyweight Championship.

On 14 March 2012, Devitt traveled to Mexico for his first tour of the country with the Consejo Mundial de Lucha Libre promotion, as part of a working relationship between New Japan and CMLL. After being sidelined from in-ring action due to a calf injury for his first week in Mexico, Devitt made his CMLL debut on 23 March, teaming with Marco Corleone and Rush in a six-man tag team main event, where they faced Mephisto, Último Guerrero and Volador Jr. After pinning Volador Jr. for the win, Devitt challenged him to a match for the NWA World Historic Middleweight Championship. On 30 March, Devitt defeated Volador Jr. to become the new NWA World Historic Middleweight Champion. On 3 May at Wrestling Dontaku 2012, Devitt lost the IWGP Junior Heavyweight Championship to Low Ki in his fifth defense, ending his second reign at 227 days. On 27 May, Devitt entered the 2012 Best of the Super Juniors tournament, which he started off with losses against Kushida and Taichi. Devitt bounced back, winning five out of his six remaining matches, including a win over Jushin Thunder Liger in the final round-robin match of the tournament on 9 June, to finish second in his block and advance to the semifinals of the tournament. The following day, Devitt was eliminated from the tournament in the semifinals by Low Ki. On 8 July, Devitt defeated Taichi to make his first successful defense of the NWA World Historic Middleweight Championship. His second successful title defense took place on 29 July, when he defeated previous champion Volador Jr. in a rematch in the main event of a New Japan event in Korakuen Hall. On 12 September, Devitt returned to Mexico for another tour with CMLL. Devitt wrestled his first match back in CMLL two days later at the 79th Anniversary Show, where he, Atlantis and Místico II were defeated in a six-man tag team match by Dragón Rojo Jr., Negro Casas and Último Guerrero, when Rojo pinned Devitt for the win. On 21 September, Devitt was again pinned by Rojo in a six-man tag team match, where he teamed with Blue Panther and La Sombra to face Rojo, Mr. Águila and Taichi. Afterwards, Devitt accepted Rojo's challenge for the NWA World Historic Middleweight Championship. On the 28 September CMLL Super Viernes show, Devitt lost the title to Rojo, ending his reign at 182 days.

Devitt returned to New Japan on 8 October at King of Pro-Wrestling, challenging IWGP Junior Heavyweight Champion Low Ki to a title match, after he had regained the title from Kota Ibushi. On 21 October, Apollo 55 entered the 2012 Super Jr. Tag Tournament, defeating Chaos World Wrestling Warriors (Brian Kendrick and Low Ki) in their first round match. On 2 November, Devitt and Taguchi defeated the reigning IWGP Junior Heavyweight Tag Team Champions, the Forever Hooligans (Alex Koslov and Rocky Romero), to advance to the finals of the tournament, where, later that same day, they were defeated by the Time Splitters (Alex Shelley and Kushida). On 11 November at Power Struggle, Devitt defeated Low Ki to win the IWGP Junior Heavyweight Championship for the third time. On 4 January 2013 at Wrestle Kingdom 7 in Tokyo Dome, Devitt defeated Low Ki and Kota Ibushi in a rare three-way match for his first successful defense of the title. Following his win, Devitt accepted a challenge for the title made by his tag team partner, Ryusuke Taguchi. On 3 February, Devitt picked up a big win, when he pinned reigning IWGP Heavyweight Champion Hiroshi Tanahashi in a tag team match, where he and Karl Anderson faced Tanahashi and Taguchi. Seven days later, Devitt defeated Taguchi at The New Beginning for his second successful defense of the IWGP Junior Heavyweight Championship. On 3 March, Devitt main evented New Japan's 41st anniversary event, losing to Hiroshi Tanahashi in a non-title match. Following the loss, Devitt began portraying a more cocky and villainous persona, regularly disrespecting both partners and opponents, with the exception of Ryusuke Taguchi, whom he tried to get to go along with his new attitude. On 5 April, Devitt defeated Alex Shelley for his third successful defense of the IWGP Junior Heavyweight Championship. Two days later at Invasion Attack, Apollo 55 unsuccessfully challenged Time Splitters for the IWGP Junior Heavyweight Tag Team Championship, after which Devitt turned on Taguchi, ending the longtime partnership between the two, and debuted Bad Luck Fale as his new "bouncer", while also dubbing himself the "Real Rocknrolla".

==== Bullet Club (2013–2014) ====
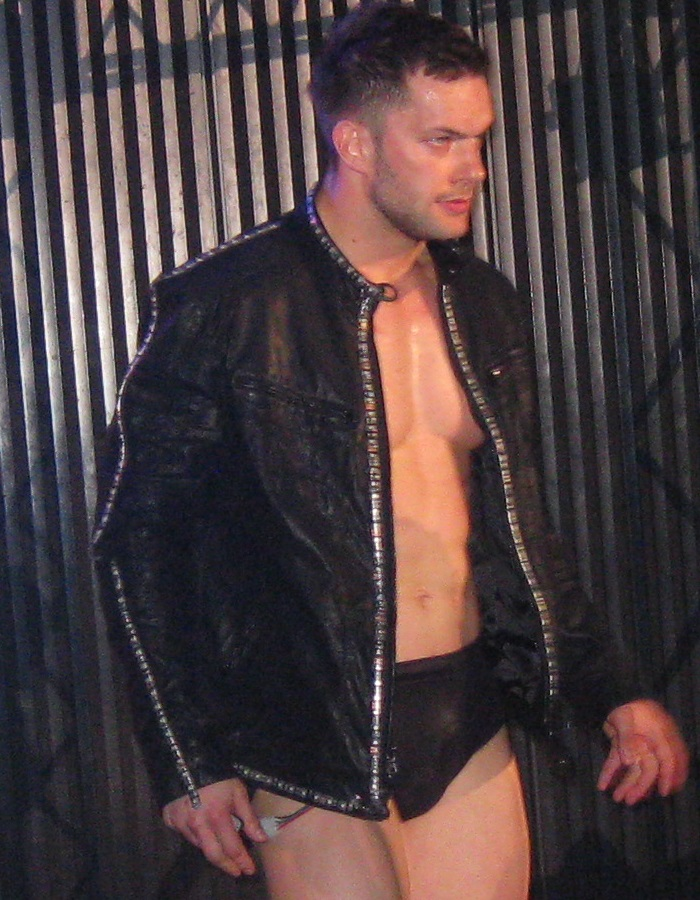
Devitt in June 2013

The first match between the former members of Apollo 55 took place on 3 May at Wrestling Dontaku 2013, where Devitt and Fale defeated Taguchi and Captain New Japan in a tag team match. Later in the event, Devitt and Fale were joined by Karl Anderson and Tama Tonga for an attack on Hiroshi Tanahashi. The new group was subsequently named "Bullet Club". On 24 May, Devitt entered the 2013 Best of the Super Juniors, where he ended up winning his block with a clean record of eight wins, though often using outside help from his Bullet Club stablemates to win his matches. On 9 June, Devitt first defeated Kenny Omega in the semifinals and then Alex Shelley in the finals to win his second Best of the Super Juniors. Following his win, Devitt challenged Hiroshi Tanahashi, while also naming his next goal; becoming the first wrestler to hold the IWGP Junior Heavyweight and IWGP Heavyweight Championships simultaneously.

On 22 June at Dominion 6.22, Devitt defeated Tanahashi with help from Bullet Club to earn his first shot at the IWGP Heavyweight Championship. Later in the event, reigning IWGP Heavyweight Champion Kazuchika Okada accepted Devitt's challenge for his title on the condition that he first defend the IWGP Junior Heavyweight Championship against his Chaos stablemate Gedo. On 5 July, Devitt defeated Gedo in his fourth successful title defense, advancing to the IWGP Heavyweight Championship match against Okada. The title match between the two took place on 20 July and saw Okada defeat Devitt, despite interference from the rest of Bullet Club, to retain his title. On 1 August, Devitt defeated Okada, with help from Fale, in the main event of the first day of the 2013 G1 Climax. Despite three other big wins over former IWGP Heavyweight Champions Hiroshi Tanahashi, Satoshi Kojima, and Togi Makabe, Devitt failed to advance from his block, finishing with a record of five wins and four losses. The rivalry between Devitt and Tanahashi culminated in a Lumberjack Deathmatch on 29 September at Destruction, where Tanahashi was victorious.

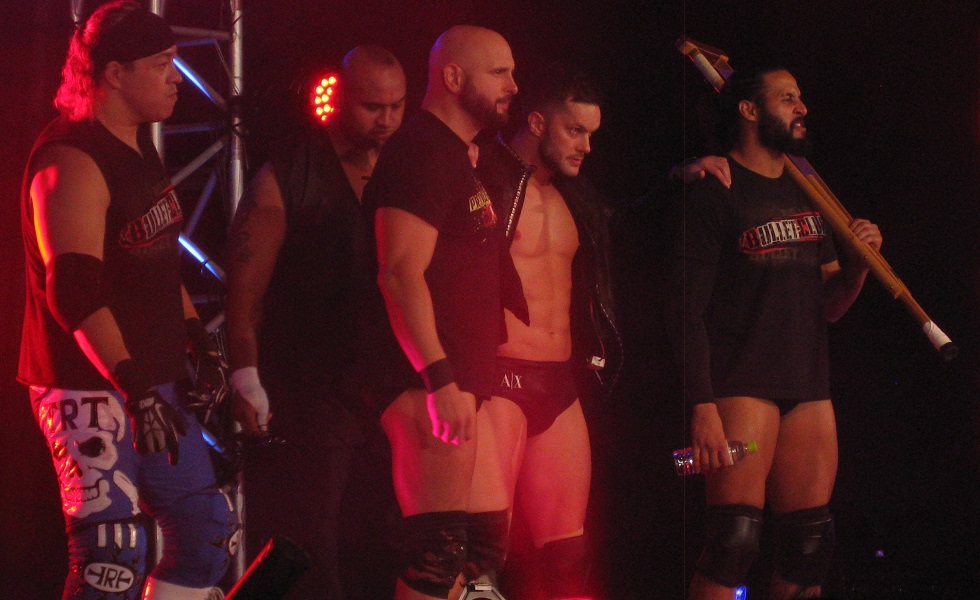
Devitt with Bullet Club in September 2013

With the Tanahashi rivalry behind him, Devitt moved onto a new rivalry with Togi Makabe, who played a big part in him losing the Lumberjack Deathmatch. Meanwhile, Devitt also found himself a new challenger for the IWGP Junior Heavyweight Championship, recent NJPW signee Kota Ibushi, who pinned him a tag team match on 9 November at Power Struggle, where he and Bad Luck Fale were defeated by Ibushi and Makabe. From 23 November to 7 December, Devitt and Fale took part in the 2013 World Tag League, where they finished with a record of three wins and three losses, with a loss against the previously winless Captain New Japan and Hiroshi Tanahashi on the final day costing them a spot in the semifinals.

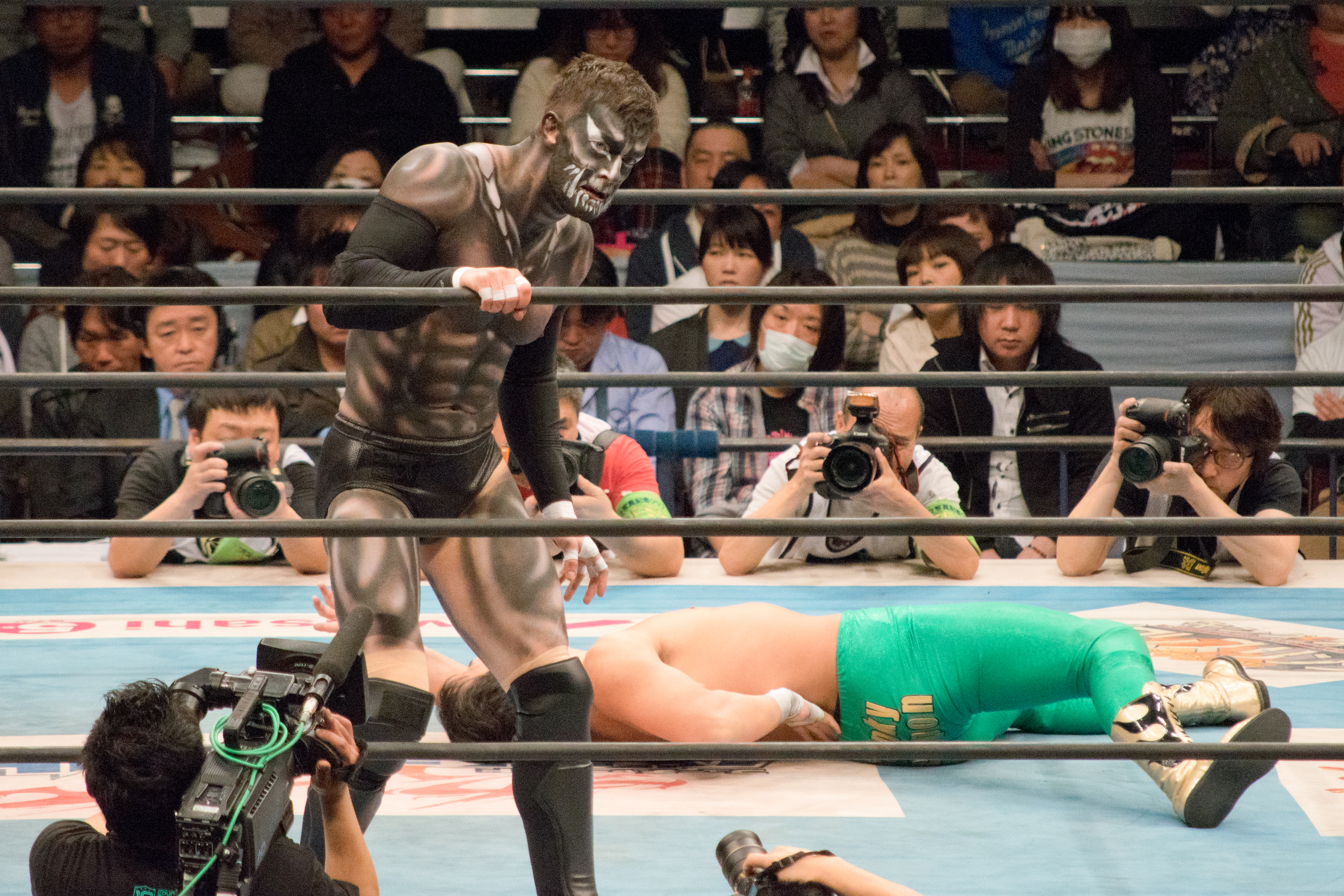
Devitt in his final NJPW match, wrestling Ryusuke Taguchi at Invasion Attack 2014

On 4 January 2014 at Wrestle Kingdom 8 in Tokyo Dome, Devitt's fourteen-month reign as the IWGP Junior Heavyweight Champion came to an end when he lost the title to Kota Ibushi in his fifth defense. Devitt wrestled the entire match in a full face and body paint, which he continued using for his bigger matches for the rest of his NJPW run. The following day, Devitt was attacked by the returning Ryusuke Taguchi, who had been sidelined with an injury for the past seven months, re-igniting the rivalry between the two former partners. On 6 April at Invasion Attack 2014, one year after the break-up of Apollo 55, Devitt faced Taguchi in a singles grudge match. During the match, Devitt repeatedly told The Young Bucks (Matt and Nick Jackson), the two newest members of Bullet Club, not to interfere in the match, which eventually led to them turning on him. In the end, Taguchi defeated Devitt, after which the two men shook hands, ending their rivalry with each other. The following day, New Japan announced Devitt's resignation from the promotion.

=== WWE ===
==== NXT Champion (2014–2016) ====
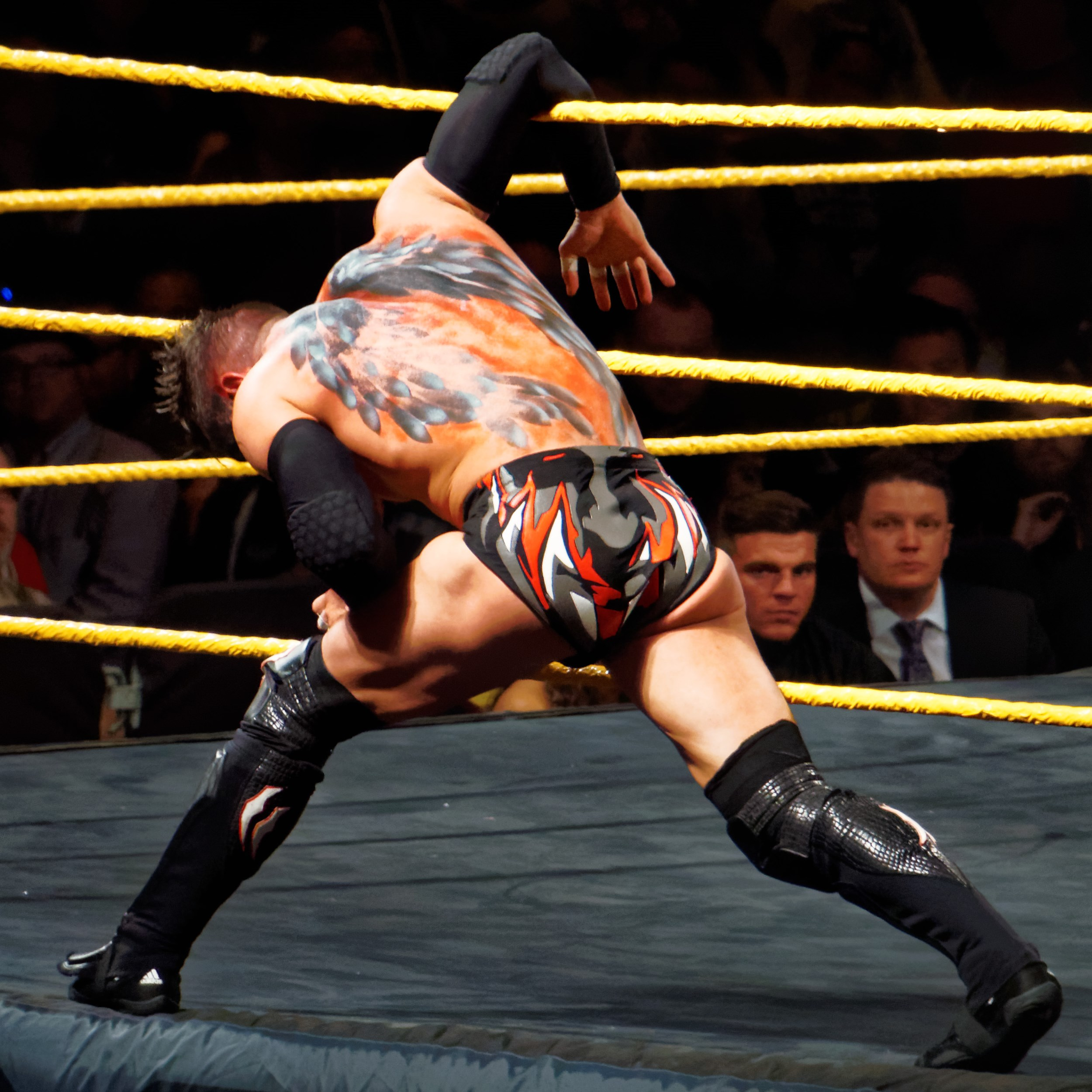
Bálor with body paint in March 2015

On 15 May 2014, Devitt was reported to have signed with WWE and would join NXT, then the promotion's developmental territory, once he obtained a visa. On 28 July, WWE officially confirmed Devitt's signing, announcing he would report to NXT that same day. On 24 September, his new ring name was revealed to be Finn Bálor, derived from Irish mythological figures Fionn mac Cumhaill and Balor (the latter is also Gaelic for "Demon King"). Bálor made his NXT debut on 6 November, aiding Hideo Itami against The Ascension (Konnor and Viktor). In his debut match on 23 October, he and Itami defeated Justin Gabriel and Tyson Kidd in a tag team match. After feuding with The Ascension, Bálor and Itami defeated them at NXT TakeOver: R Evolution on 11 December, where he also debuted his signature body paint. Bálor then entered an NXT Championship number one contender's tournament, defeating Curtis Axel in the first round, Itami in the semi-finals and Adrian Neville in the finals on 11 February at NXT TakeOver: Rival. Bálor received his title match against Kevin Owens on 25 March, but was unsuccessful.

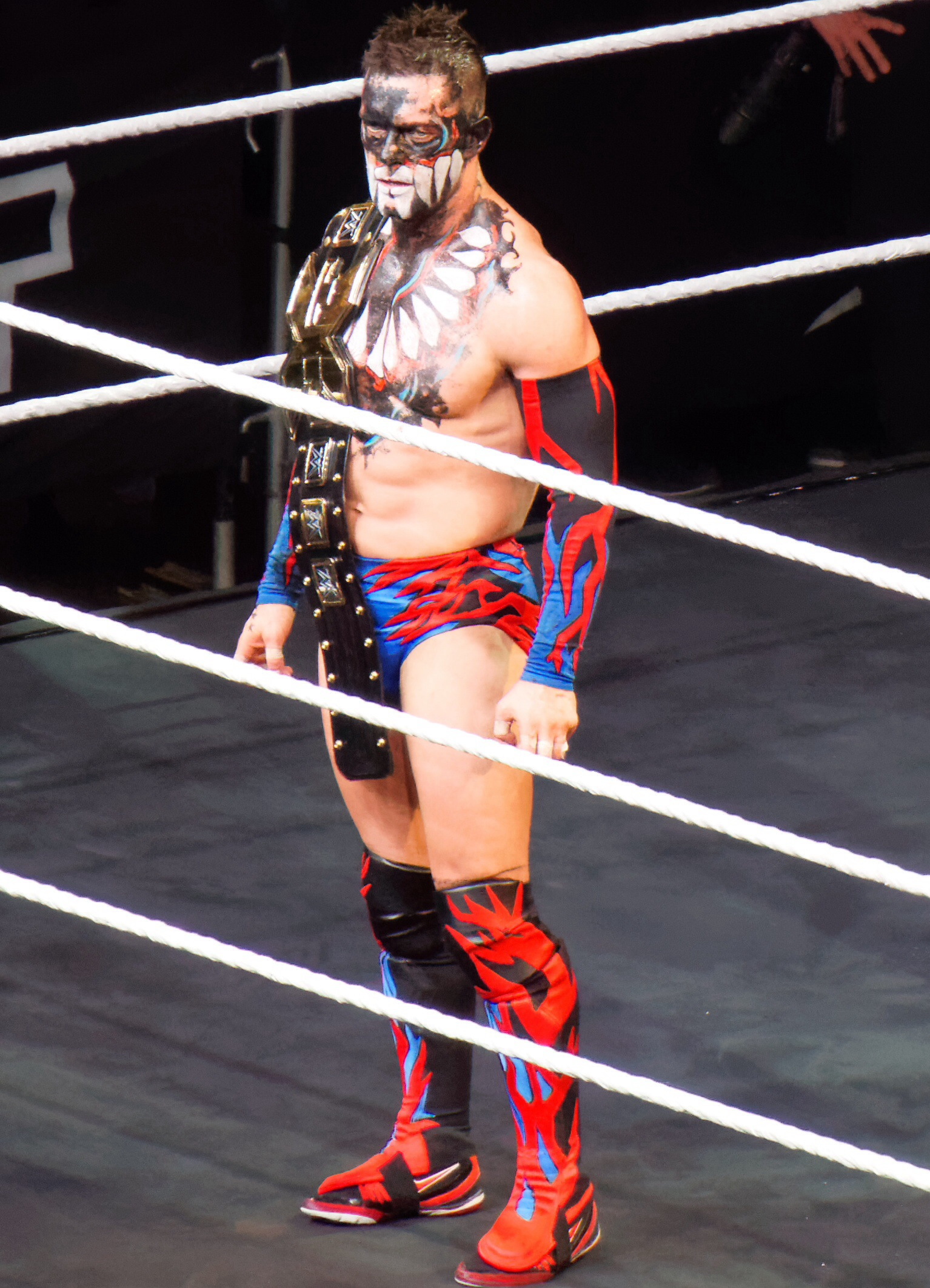
Bálor after he retained the NXT Championship at NXT TakeOver: Dallas in April 2016

After defeating Tyler Breeze on 20 May at NXT TakeOver: Unstoppable, Bálor received another title shot against Owens on 4 July at The Beast in the East in Tokyo, Japan, defeating Owens to win the NXT Championship. Bálor defeated Owens in a ladder match to retain the title at NXT TakeOver: Brooklyn on 22 August. Bálor later entered the Dusty Rhodes Tag Team Classic tournament in August, pairing with Samoa Joe and defeating The Lucha Dragons (Sin Cara and Kalisto) in the first round, Enzo Amore and Colin Cassady in the quarter-finals, Dash Wilder and Scott Dawson in the semi-finals and Baron Corbin and Rhyno in the finals on 7 October at NXT TakeOver: Respect to win the tournament. On 4 November episode of NXT, Bálor defended the NXT Championship against Apollo Crews, but the match ended in a no contest after Baron Corbin interfered, attacking both men. Joe came out and chased Corbin away before turning on Bálor and attacking him, which ignited a feud between the two. At NXT TakeOver: London on 16 December, Bálor defeated Joe to retain the title. On 1 April at NXT TakeOver: Dallas, Bálor retained the NXT Championship in a rematch with Joe. On 17 April, Bálor became the longest reigning NXT Champion in history (the record has since broken by Adam Cole in 2020) by surpassing Neville's previous record of 287 days. On 21 April, Bálor lost the NXT Championship to Joe at a live event in Lowell, Massachusetts, ending his reign at 292 days. At NXT TakeOver: The End on 8 June, Bálor lost to Joe in the first ever NXT steel cage match in a rematch for the NXT Championship, marking his first TakeOver loss, and subsequently his first loss under his "Demon" persona. Bálor wrestled his final NXT match on 30 July, teaming with Shinsuke Nakamura to defeat Bobby Roode and Samoa Joe.

==== Universal Champion and injury (2016–2017) ====
On 19 July 2016, Bálor was drafted to the Raw brand as the fifth overall pick in the 2016 WWE draft, later declaring that he should have been the first pick. He made his first appearance for the brand on 25 July episode of Raw (on his 35th birthday), where he won the right to compete for the newly established WWE Universal Championship at SummerSlam by first defeating Rusev, Cesaro, and Kevin Owens in a fatal four–way match and then defeating Roman Reigns, who had won a similar fatal four–way match. At SummerSlam on 21 August, Bálor defeated Seth Rollins to become the inaugural Universal Champion and win his first world title. Since then, WWE reported that he sustained a shoulder injury during the match and an MRI revealed a labrum tear that would require surgery, which was successful. Because of this, it was expected that Bálor would be out four to six months, thus Raw General Manager Mick Foley later announced on Twitter that Bálor would be relinquishing his newly won WWE Universal Championship due to his injury after just 22 hours of holding it. While recovering from his injury, Bálor would appear on the WWE Network–exclusive United Kingdom Championship Tournament event.

On 22 February 2017, Bálor returned to NXT to assist Shinsuke Nakamura, who was outnumbered by Andrade "Cien" Almas and Bobby Roode. On 10 March, Bálor made his in–ring return at a live event in a six–man tag team match, teaming with Chris Jericho and Sami Zayn to defeat Kevin Owens, Samoa Joe and Triple H. Bálor made his television return after WrestleMania 33 on 3 April episode of Raw, where he teamed with his former rival Seth Rollins as the two defeated Owens and Joe in a tag team match. Over the following weeks, Bálor would score victories over Jinder Mahal and Curt Hawkins while also receiving an ominous warning from Bray Wyatt and confronting Luke Gallows and Karl Anderson. On 4 June at Extreme Rules, Bálor competed in a fatal five–way extreme rules match to determine the number one contender for Brock Lesnar's Universal Championship, in which Bálor lost after he passed out from Samoa Joe's Coquina Clutch.

==== Bálor Club (2017–2018) ====
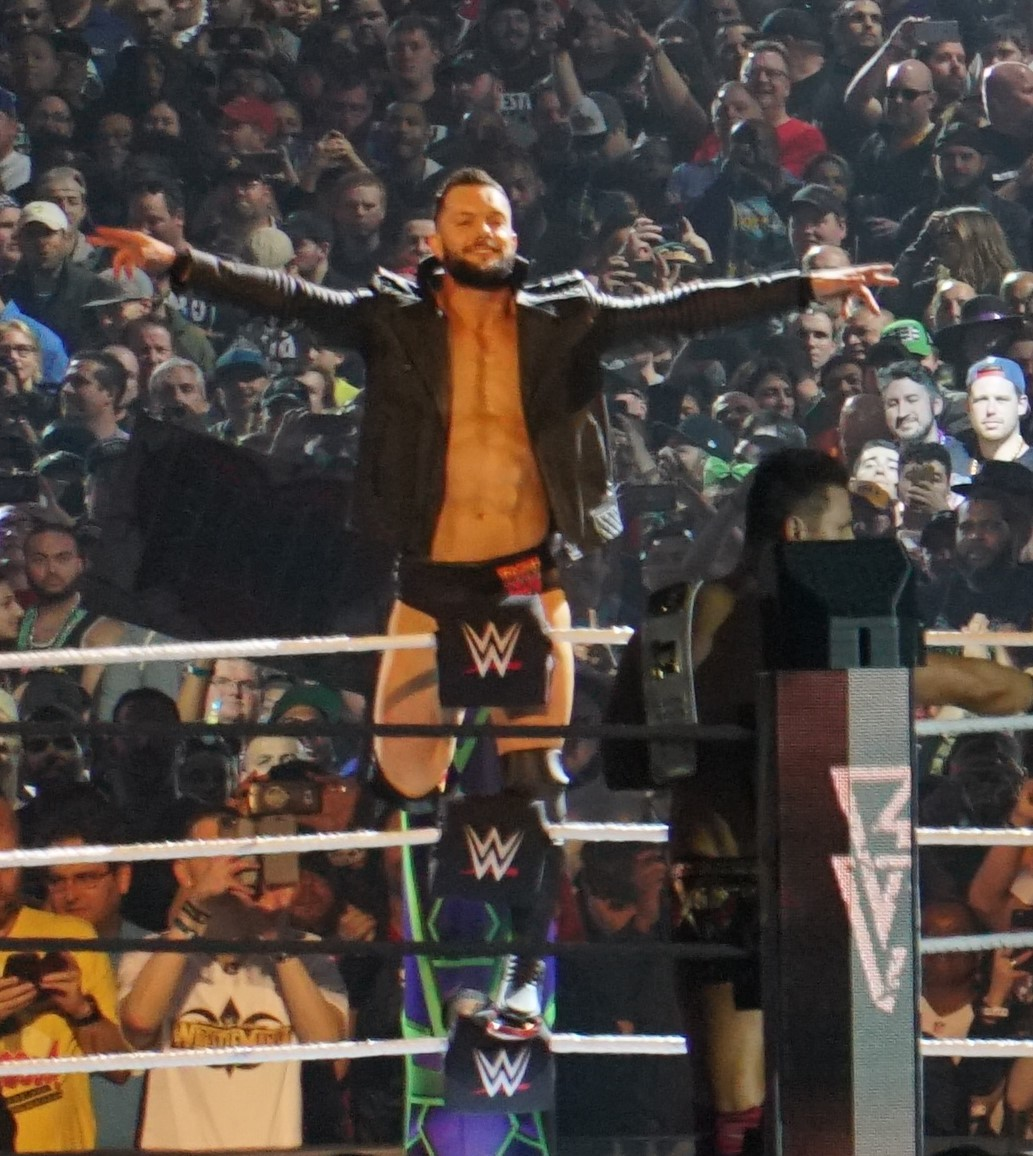
Bálor making his entrance at WrestleMania 34 in April 2018

In the weeks leading up to SummerSlam, Bálor began a feud with Elias after he inadvertently interrupted one of his performances. This led to a No Disqualification match between the two, which Bálor lost after interference from Bray Wyatt. This led to a match between the two, where Wyatt defeated Bálor. At SummerSlam on 20 August, Bálor returned his "Demon King" character and defeated Wyatt in a rematch. The feud between the two continued throughout the following months and led to another match on 24 September at No Mercy, where Bálor once again defeated Wyatt. The two were also set to face in a rematch between Bálor's "Demon King" and Wyatt's "Sister Abigail" at TLC on 20 October. However, Wyatt was ruled out for the event due to an illness, and was instead replaced by AJ Styles. Bálor defeated Styles, and following the match, the two showed mutual respect, gesturing the "Too Sweet" hand symbol to each other. At the Survivor Series event on 19 November, Bálor took part in the traditional inter-brand five–on–five elimination match as part of Team Raw where he was the fifth man eliminated by Randy Orton, although his team was ultimately victorious.

On 1 January 2018 episode of Raw, Bálor teamed with Luke Gallows and Karl Anderson to defeat Elias and The Miztourage (Curtis Axel and Bo Dallas) in a six–man tag team match. The following week, the trio officially reunited and formed "Bálor Club", an homage to their former stable. That same night, they defeated Intercontinental Champion Roman Reigns and Raw Tag Team Champions Seth Rollins and Jason Jordan in a six–man tag team match. On 28 January, at the Royal Rumble, Bálor entered his first Royal Rumble match at number 2, lasting over 57 minutes and eliminating four participants before being eliminated by John Cena. Bálor competed for the first time in an Elimination Chamber match at the namesake pay–per–view on 25 February, where he was first entered but was the second participant eliminated by Braun Strowman. Over the next two months, Bálor started a short feud with The Miz and Seth Rollins over the Intercontinental Championship, which led to a triple threat match at WrestleMania 34 on 8 April (which was also Bálor's Wrestlemania debut) where Rollins won the title. At the Greatest Royal Rumble event on 27 April, Bálor once again unsuccessfully challenged for the Intercontinental Championship in a fatal four–way ladder match against Rollins, Miz and Samoa Joe. Bálor competed in a Money in the Bank ladder match on 17 June, however, the match was ultimately won by Braun Strowman.

After the Money in the Bank pay–per–view, Bálor engaged in a feud with Baron Corbin, whom he defeated on two different occasions—on 15 July at Extreme Rules and on 19 August at SummerSlam under his "Demon King" persona. The next night on Raw, Bálor was finally awarded with his Universal Championship rematch against newly crowned champion Roman Reigns, but was unsuccessful in regaining the title. Throughout the next few months, Bálor would compete in various matches against competitors such as Jinder Mahal, and Bobby Lashley. Bálor then started a feud with Drew McIntyre who saved him from an attack by Lashley only to attack Bálor himself. During that time, Bálor was announced as part of Team Raw for the traditional interbrand five–on–five elimination match at Survivor Series on 18 November, where he was the first man from the team to be eliminated by Rey Mysterio.

==== Intercontinental Champion (2018–2019) ====
On 16 December at TLC: Tables, Ladders & Chairs, Bálor gained revenge over McIntyre, defeating him in a singles match after interference by McIntyre's former ally Dolph Ziggler. After the match, Ziggler attacked Bálor backstage after the latter implied that he did not need his help to beat McIntyre. This sparked a match between the two that took place the following night on Raw, which ended in a no contest as McIntyre would attack both of them. On 17 December tapings of 24 December edition of Raw, Bálor defeated Ziggler and McIntyre in a triple threat match, ending the feud. On 12 January 2019 at NXT UK TakeOver: Blackpool, Bálor made a surprise appearance as Travis Banks's replacement in his match against Jordan Devlin, as Banks was attacked by Devlin earlier that day, and subsequently defeated Devlin. On 14 January episode of Raw, after Braun Strowman was removed from his Universal Championship match against Brock Lesnar at the Royal Rumble after damaging Vince McMahon's limo, Bálor was booked in a fatal-four way match against Drew McIntyre, John Cena and Baron Corbin to determine who would take Strowman's place against Lesnar at the pay-per-view, in which Bálor emerged victorious after pinning Cena. On 27 January at the Royal Rumble pay-per-view, Bálor was defeated by Lesnar via submission. After the match, Lesnar attacked Bálor with three F-5s.

On the Raw episode of 28 January, Bálor was interrupted by Intercontinental Champion Bobby Lashley and Lio Rush while addressing his loss and was subsequently attacked by Lashley, sparking a feud between the two. On 17 February at the Elimination Chamber pay-per-view, Bálor defeated Lashley and Rush in a two-on-one handicap match to capture the Intercontinental Championship after Bálor pinned Rush. Bálor faced Lashley on 11 March edition of Raw in a rematch, where he lost the title to Lashley following interference from Rush. On 25 March edition of Raw, Bálor defeated Lashley and Jinder Mahal in a handicap match to gain a rematch for the Intercontinental title at WrestleMania 35. Bálor, using his "Demon" persona, went on to defeat Lashley on 7 April at WrestleMania and regained the Intercontinental Championship. The following night on Raw, Bálor defeated the returning Sami Zayn in an impromptu title defense. On 15 April episode of Raw, he lost a non-title match to the debuting Andrade after interference from Zelina Vega. In the 2019 WWE Superstar Shake-up, Bálor moved to the SmackDown brand, making his debut on 16 April episode of SmackDown, defeating Ali in a non-title match. At Super ShowDown on 7 June, Balor successfully defended his title against Andrade under his "Demon" persona. At the Extreme Rules kick-off show on 14 July, Bálor lost the championship to Shinsuke Nakamura. The following night on Raw, Bálor was assaulted by "The Fiend" Bray Wyatt, culminating in a match at SummerSlam on 11 August, where Bálor was defeated by Wyatt.

==== Return to NXT (2019–2021) ====
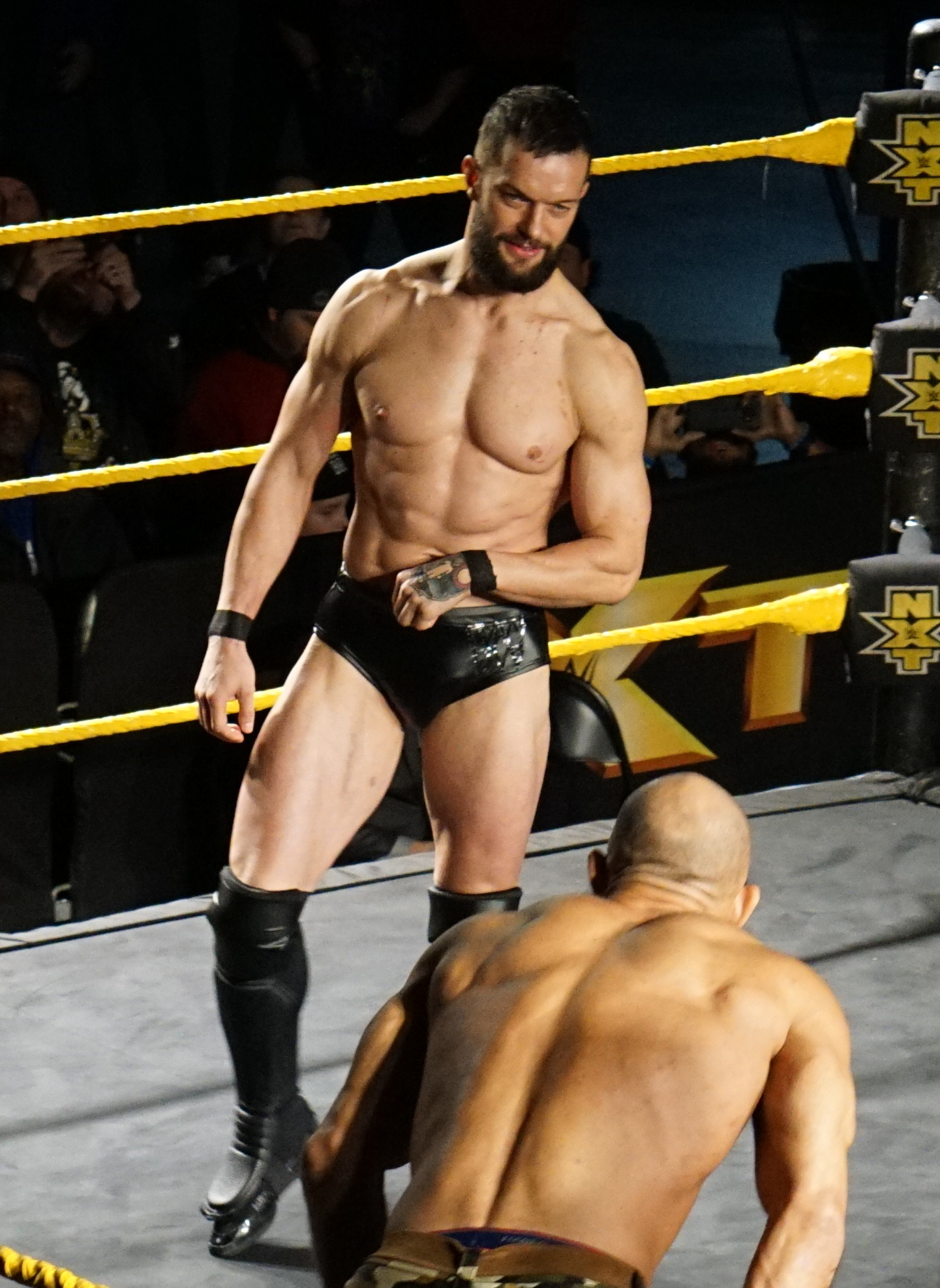
Bálor made his return to NXT in October 2019.

After a near two-month absence from television, Bálor made his return to WWE programming on 2 October episode of NXT, confronting NXT Champion Adam Cole following the latter's title defense against Matt Riddle and officially announced his return to NXT (as it had grown from a developmental territory in Bálor's first stint into a third global brand within WWE). On 23 October episode of NXT, Bálor turned heel when he aided The Undisputed Era by injuring Johnny Gargano and attacking Tommaso Ciampa. Bálor began a feud with Matt Riddle the next month leading to a match between the two being scheduled for NXT TakeOver: WarGames on 23 November, where Bálor emerged victorious. Following this, Bálor challenged Adam Cole for the NXT Championship on 18 December episode of NXT, which he lost after a distraction from the returning Johnny Gargano. Afterwards, Gargano challenged Bálor to a match at NXT TakeOver: Portland on 16 February 2020, which Bálor won.

On 22 April episode of NXT, Bálor was scheduled to have a match against Velveteen Dream, but Bálor was knocked out by an unknown attacker before he could leave his dressing room. Two weeks later, Bálor concluded that there was a "snake hiding in the long grass back there" and that whoever attacked him wanted a push. Bálor assured the audience that it would not be a push, but rather a squash. Later that night, he got into an altercation with Cameron Grimes, leading to a match between the two on 13 May episode of NXT, where Damian Priest cost Bálor the match by using a nightstick behind the referee's back. Priest then revealed that he was the one who knocked out Bálor three weeks prior, thus turning Bálor face once again. At TakeOver: In Your House on 7 June, Bálor defeated Priest. At NXT TakeOver XXX on 22 August, Bálor defeated Timothy Thatcher.

On 8 September at NXT: Super Tuesday II, Bálor defeated Adam Cole to win the vacant NXT Championship for the second time. At NXT TakeOver 31 on 4 October, Bálor made a successful title defense against Kyle O'Reilly. It was revealed he had suffered a broken jaw during the match and was forced to undergo surgery. Bálor made his return on 9 December episode of NXT where he was confronted by O'Reilly, Pete Dunne, Damian Priest and Scarlett (on behalf of Karrion Kross). Balor would then successfully defend the championship in a rematch against O'Reilly on 6 January 2021 at NXT: New Year's Evil. He would also defend the championship against Pete Dunne and Adam Cole at NXT TakeOver: Vengeance Day on 14 February and on 10 March episode of NXT respectively with both times successfully defending it. At NXT TakeOver: Stand & Deliver on 8 April, Bálor lost the championship to Karrion Kross, ending his second reign at 212 days. Balor would face Kross in a rematch for the title on 25 May episode of NXT, but was defeated; his rematch with Kross would mark Bálor's final match in NXT.

==== Return to main roster and United States Champion (2021–2022) ====
After a two-month hiatus from television, Bálor made his return on 16 July episode of SmackDown. He would face WWE Universal Champion Roman Reigns on two occasions, once at SmackDown and the second one at Extreme Rules on 26 September under his "Demon" persona, but he was defeated. As part of the 2021 Draft, Bálor was drafted to the Raw brand, where he participated in the King of the Ring tournament, being defeated in the finals by Xavier Woods on 21 October at Crown Jewel.

On 28 February 2022 episode of Raw, Bálor defeated Damian Priest to win the WWE United States Championship for the first time in his career. On 18 April episode of Raw, Bálor lost the United States Championship to Theory, ending his reign at 49 days.

==== The Judgment Day (2022–2026) ====
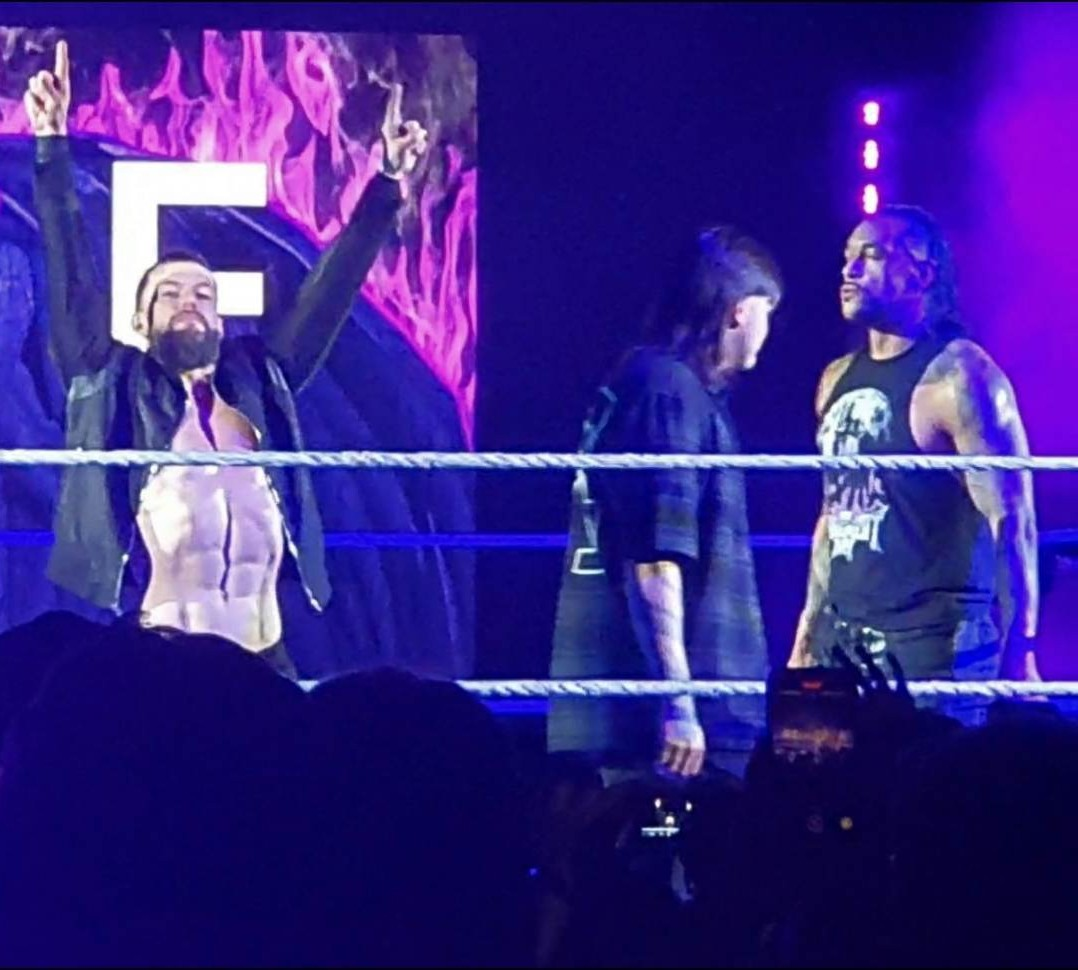
Bálor joined The Judgment Day in June 2022.

At Hell in a Cell on 5 June, Bálor, AJ Styles and Liv Morgan lost to The Judgment Day (Edge, Damian Priest and Rhea Ripley) in a six-person mixed tag team match. On 6 June episode of Raw, Edge introduced Bálor as the newest member of The Judgment Day, turning Bálor heel for the first time on the main roster, however, Bálor, Priest and Ripley suddenly attacked Edge, kicking him out of the group and cementing Bálor's heel turn. Bálor and Priest lost to The Mysterios (composed of Rey and Dominik Mysterio) on 30 July at SummerSlam and Rey and Edge at Clash at the Castle on 3 September, where Dominik turned heel on both of them to join The Judgment Day. At Extreme Rules on 8 October, Bálor defeated Edge in an "I Quit" match following interference from The Judgment Day. On 5 November at Crown Jewel, Bálor, Priest, and Dominik defeated The O.C. (Styles, Luke Gallows, and Karl Anderson) in a six-man tag team match after interference from Ripley. On 26 November at Survivor Series: WarGames, Bálor lost to Styles. On the following episode of Raw, The Judgment Day defeated The O.C. in an eight-person mixed tag team match to end their feud.

At the Royal Rumble on 28 January 2023, Bálor entered the Royal Rumble match at number 20 but was eliminated by the returning Edge. Afterwards, Bálor and Priest eliminated Edge with help from Dominik, despite already being eliminated. At Elimination Chamber on 18 February, Bálor and Ripley lost to Edge and Beth Phoenix in a mixed tag team match. At Night 2 of WrestleMania 39 on 2 April, Bálor, in his "Demon" persona, lost to Edge in a Hell in a Cell match. During the match, Bálor suffered an injury after getting hit by a ladder thrown by Edge and had to be medically treated in the ring. Bálor would then be selected amongst a group of Raw superstars to participate in a tournament to crown a new World Heavyweight Champion at Night of Champions. On 8 May episode of Raw, Bálor defeated Cody Rhodes and The Miz in a triple threat match in the first round of the tournament, but lost to eventual champion Seth "Freakin" Rollins in the semifinals later that night. Bálor failed to win the title from Rollins at Money in the Bank on 1 July and SummerSlam on 5 August.

On 2 September at Payback, Bálor and Priest defeated Kevin Owens and Sami Zayn to win the Undisputed WWE Tag Team Championship after interference from Dominik, Ripley, and JD McDonagh. With this win, Bálor became the 24th WWE Grand Slam Champion. On 25 September episode of Raw, Bálor and Priest retained their titles in a rematch against Owens and Zayn. They lost the titles to Cody Rhodes and Jey Uso at Fastlane on 7 October after McDonagh accidentally hit Priest with his Money in the Bank briefcase, ending their first reign at 35 days, but regained them in a rematch on 16 October episode of Raw. On 13 November episode of Raw, Bálor and Priest again defeated Rhodes and Uso to retain their titles after interference from Drew McIntyre. On 24 November episode of SmackDown, Bálor and Priest successfully defended their titles against The Street Profits (Angelo Dawkins and Montez Ford). The next night at Survivor Series WarGames, Bálor participated in his first WarGames match alongside The Judgment Day (which now included McDonagh) and McIntyre, losing to Rhodes, Rollins, Uso, Zayn and the returning Randy Orton. On 18 December episode of Raw, Bálor and Priest successfully defended their titles against the Creed Brothers. At Royal Rumble on 27 January, Bálor entered the Royal Rumble match at number 14, eliminating Carmelo Hayes alongside Dominik before being eliminated by Bron Breakker. On the following episode of Raw, Bálor and Priest defeated DIY (Johnny Gargano and Tommaso Ciampa) to retain their titles. At Elimination Chamber: Perth on 24 February, Bálor and Priest successfully defended the titles against New Catch Republic (Pete Dunne and Tyler Bate). At Night 1 of WrestleMania XL on 6 April, Bálor and Priest lost the SmackDown Tag Team Championship to A-Town Down Under (Austin Theory and Grayson Waller) and the Raw Tag Team Championship to The Awesome Truth (The Miz and R-Truth) respectively in a six-pack tag team ladder match, ending their second reign with the undisputed titles at 173 days.

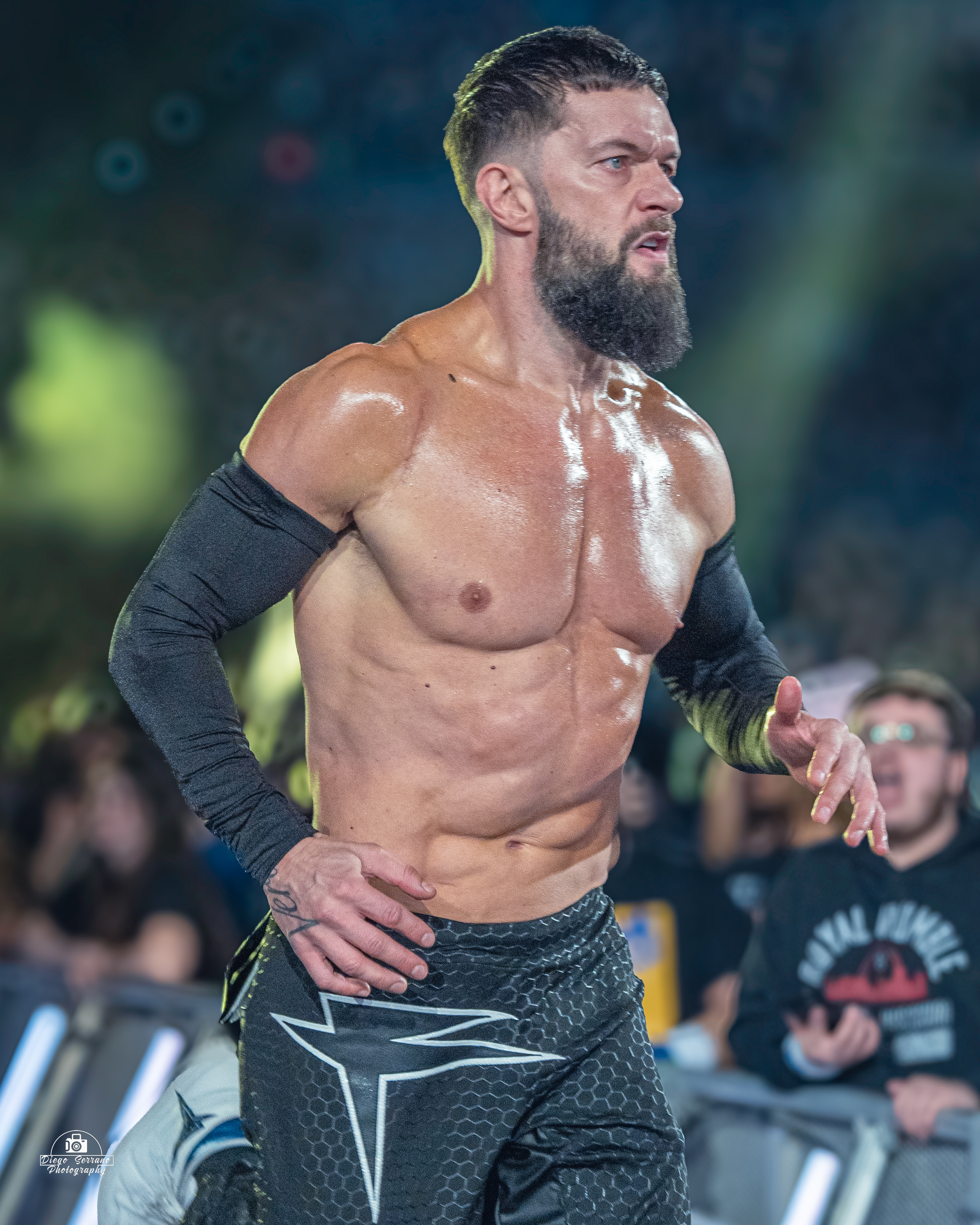
Bálor making his entrance at the 2025 Royal Rumble.

After Priest won the World Heavyweight Championship at Night 2 of WrestleMania XL, Bálor began teaming with McDonagh. On 13 May episode of Raw, they won a fatal four-way match with help from Carlito, who began inserting himself into the group, to become the number one contenders for the newly renamed World Tag Team Championship the following week, but they failed to win the titles from Awesome Truth after Braun Strowman prevented Carlito from interfering. On 24 June episode of Raw, with help from Liv Morgan, Bálor and McDonagh defeated Awesome Truth to win the titles. At SummerSlam on 3 August, Bálor turned on Priest, costing him his World Heavyweight Championship against Gunther. Bálor lost to Priest at Bad Blood on 5 October and failed to win the World Heavyweight Championship from Gunther in a triple threat match also involving Priest at Saturday Night's Main Event on 14 December. On 16 December episode of Raw, Bálor and McDonagh lost the World Tag Team Championship to The War Raiders (Erik and Ivar) after interference from Priest, ending their reign at 175 days. On 13 January 2025 episode of Raw, Bálor lost to Priest in a Street Fight match despite assistance from Carlito and McDonagh, ending their feud.

At Royal Rumble on 1 February, Bálor entered at number 18, eliminating Penta before being eliminated by John Cena. Over the next few months, and Dominik began to pursue the Intercontinental Championship as tensions between them increased. On Night 2 of WrestleMania 41 on 20 April, Bálor failed to win the title from Bron Breakker in a fatal four-way match also involving Penta and Dominik, with Bálor being pinned by Dominik to become champion. On the 30 June episode of Raw, Bálor and McDonagh defeated The New Day (Kofi Kingston and Xavier Woods) to win the World Tag Team Championship, starting their second reign as a duo and Bálor's fourth reign holding the title. On the 20 October episode of Raw, they lost the titles to AJ Styles and Dragon Lee, ending their second reign at 112 days.

==== Return to singles competition (2026–present) ====
On the 12 January 2026 episode of Raw, Bálor confronted CM Punk and challenged him to a match for Punk's World Heavyweight Championship the next week in his home country of Ireland, where he lost. At Elimination Chamber on 28 February, Bálor failed to win the title from Punk in a rematch. On the following episode of Raw, Bálor refused to help Dominik retain his Intercontinental Championship by cheating, teasing a face turn.

On the 9 March episode of Raw, Bálor argued with Dominik, only to be beat down by the other members of The Judgment Day (McDonagh, Morgan and Raquel Rodriguez), kicking him out of the group, turning face for the first time since June 2022. On 19 April at WrestleMania 42, Bálor, in his "Demon" persona for the first time in three years, defeated Dominik in a Street Fight. On the 18 May episode of Raw, Bálor defeated McDonagh in a Street Fight despite interference from Dominik to end his feud with the stable. Afterwards, Bálor was transferred to the SmackDown brand. At Night 2 of SummerSlam on August 2, Bálor lost to a returning Kevin Owens in a Fatal 4-Way match to determine the #1 contender for the Undisputed WWE Championship also involving Gunther and Sami Zayn.

== Professional wrestling style and persona ==
After working under his real name, Devitt changed his ring name to Prince Devitt when he went to New Japan Pro-Wrestling because nobody Japanese could pronounce his actual name. He was originally going to be called King David until people started questioning why the 24-year-old would be a king already. Eventually, Simon Inoki came up with the name Prince Devitt, which Devitt himself also preferred. During his time in Japan, Devitt started to use body paint during some matches.

When he signed with WWE, Devitt worked under two characters: Finn Bálor (named after the legendary Irish hero Fionn mac Cumhaill and Balor of the Evil Eye, an antagonistic character from Gaelic mythology) and The Demon (sometimes the Demon King), a darker and more aggressive otherworldly alter-ego. After Devitt returned to NXT in 2019, he said he would use the character of The Demon less as its overuse had ruined the element of surprise.

Devitt uses a double foot stomp named "Coup de Grace" as a finisher. He also uses a lifting single underhook DDT (named "Bloody Sunday" in NJPW and "1916" in WWE) as a finisher.

== Other media ==
Devitt has appeared as a playable character in the video games WWE 2K16, WWE 2K17, WWE 2K18, WWE 2K19, WWE 2K20, WWE 2K Battlegrounds, WWE 2K22, WWE 2K23, WWE 2K24, WWE 2K25, and WWE 2K26.

== Personal life ==
On 19 August 2019, Devitt married Mexican sports journalist Vero Rodríguez in a private ceremony in Tulum. They had confirmed their relationship in June that year, during an interview at the UEFA Champions League final, and Devitt proposed to Rodríguez the following day. They reside in Orlando, Florida.

Devitt holds a first-degree black belt in IBF submission wrestling. He is good friends with fellow professional wrestlers AJ Styles, Karl Anderson, Luke Gallows, Tama Tonga, Jordan Devlin and Dru Onyx. He is an avid comic book reader and collector of Lego, and has worn face and body paint inspired by comic book characters when wrestling. He is a supporter of English football team Tottenham Hotspur. Devitt has mentioned being a great fan of YouTube channel "Ancient Architects" and being very interested in Ancient Egypt and how they built their structures. He is also a fan of the movie Interstellar because he "like[s] thinking of the possibility of the future."

== Championships and accomplishments ==
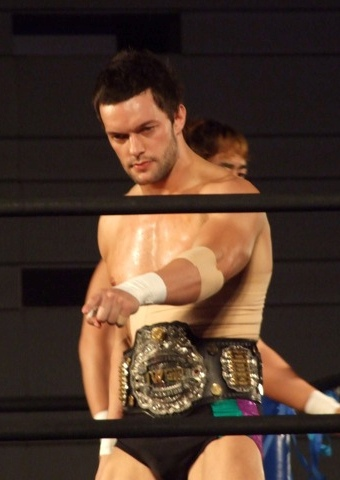
Prince Devitt is a three-time IWGP Junior Heavyweight Champion.

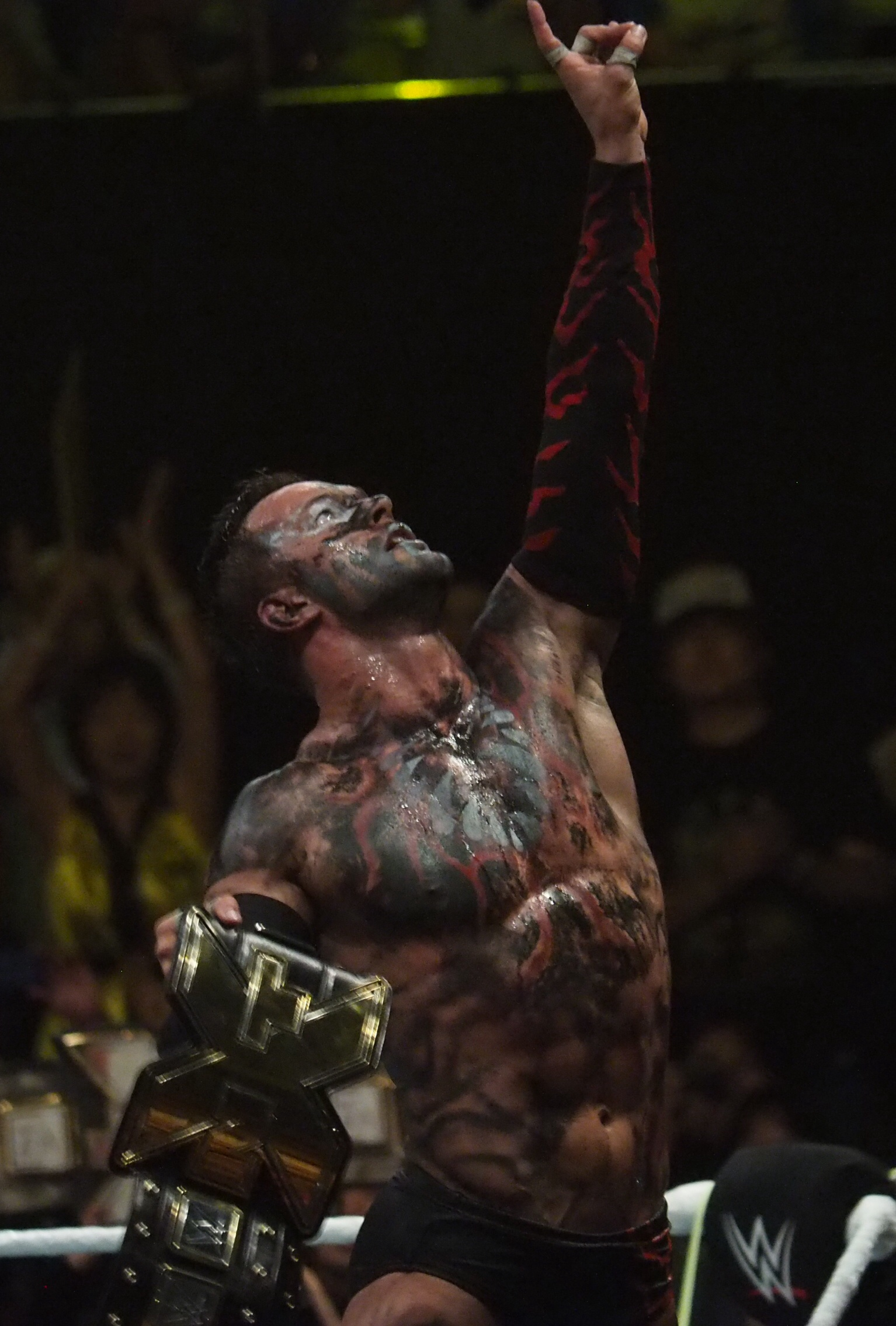
In WWE, Finn Bálor is a two-time NXT Champion, and also holds the record for longest combined reign at 504 days....

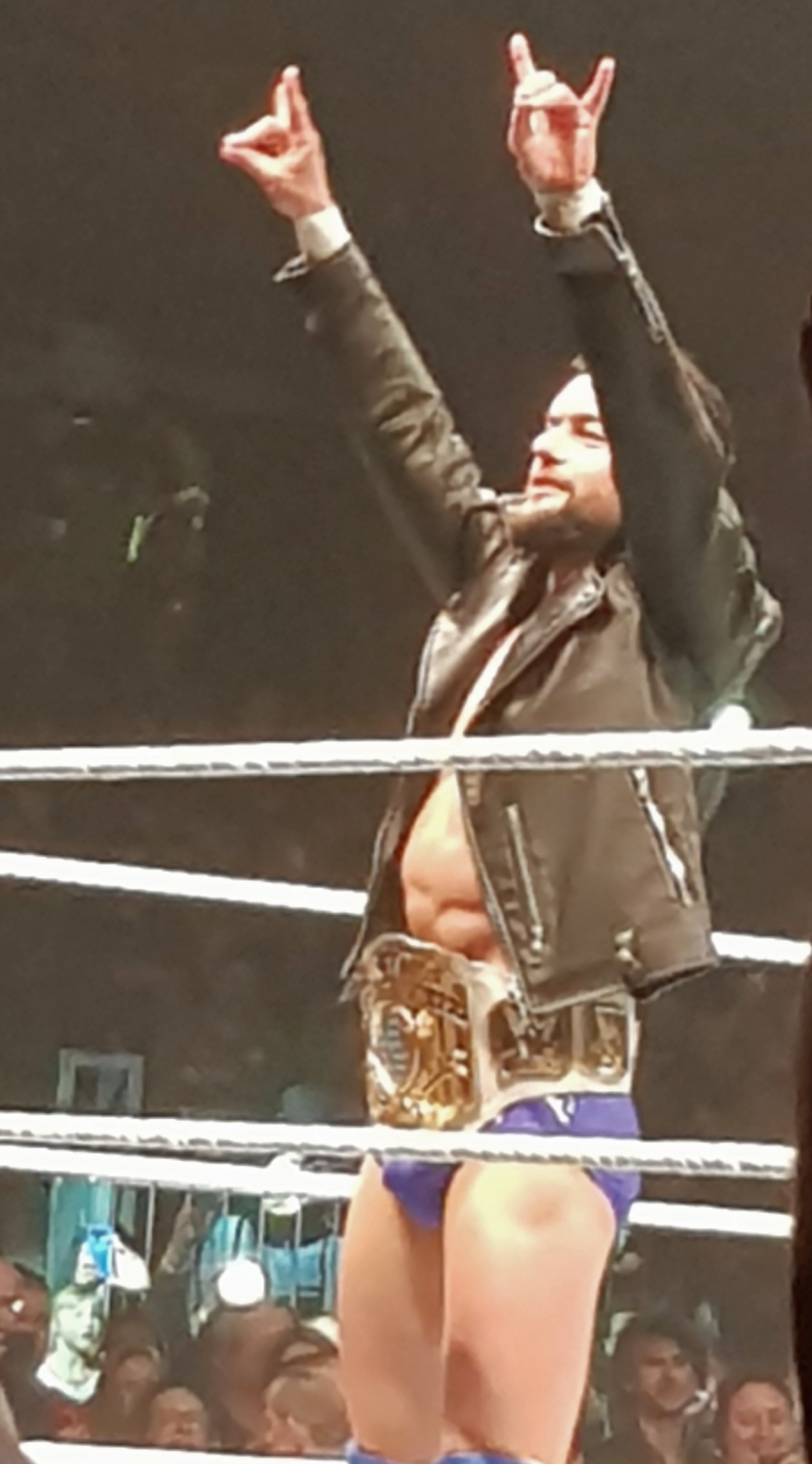
...a two-time WWE Intercontinental Champion...

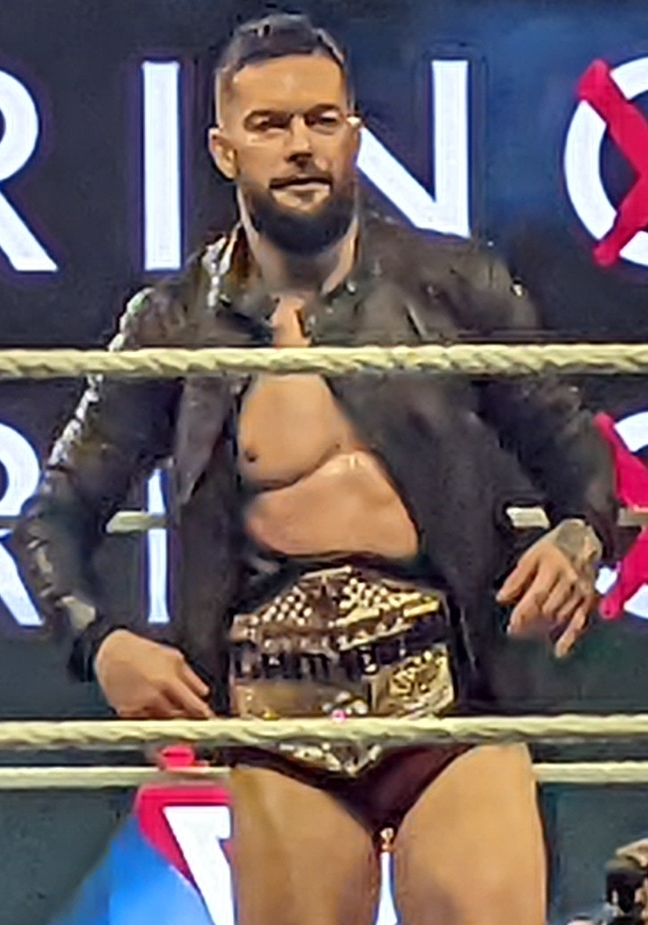
...a former WWE United States Champion...

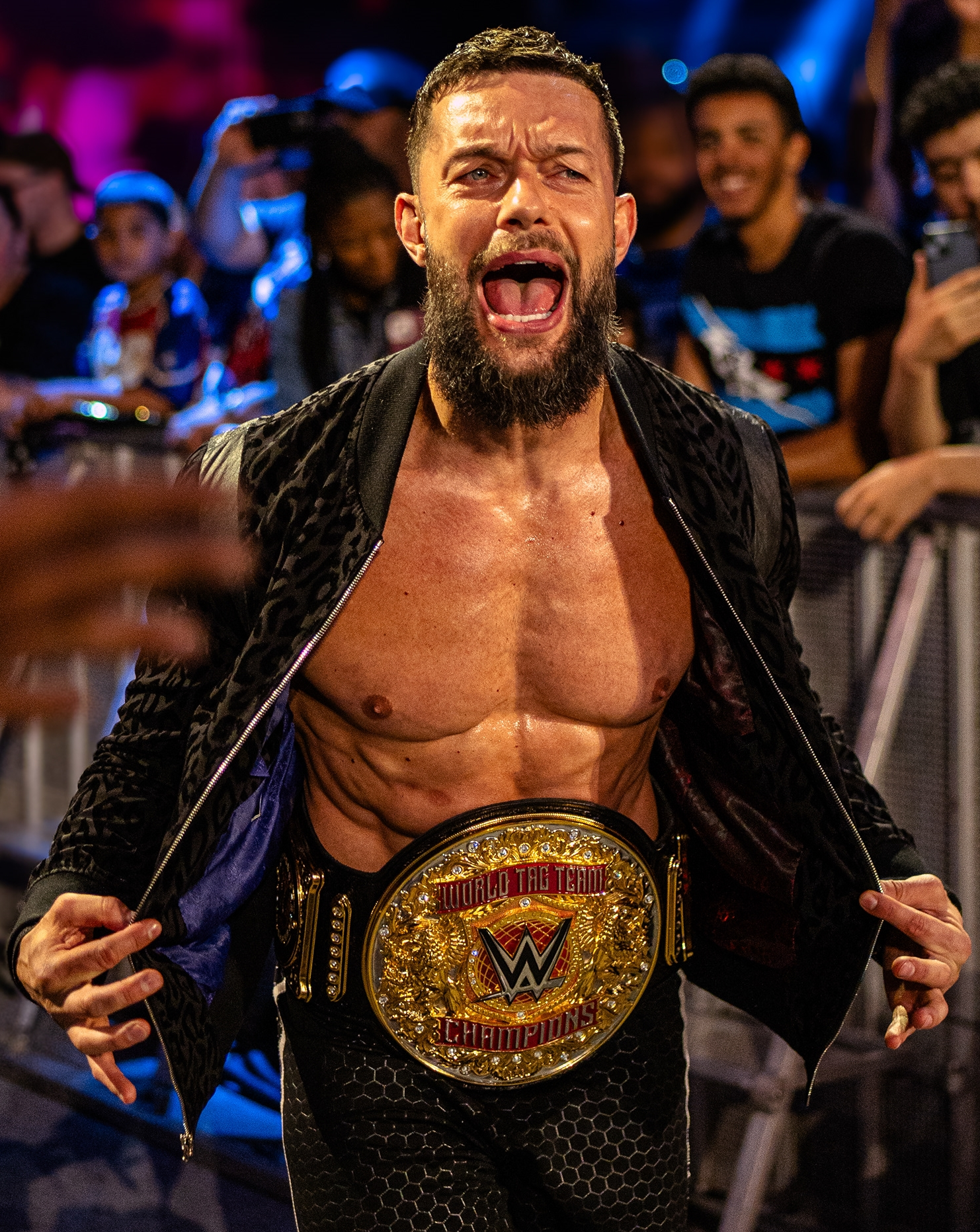
...and an overall six-time Tag Team Champion.

- American Wrestling Roadshow
  - Wrestling.Ie Championship (1 time)
- Consejo Mundial de Lucha Libre
  - NWA World Historic Middleweight Championship (1 time)
- Insane Championship Wrestling
  - ICW Zero-G Championship (1 time)
- Kaientai Dojo
  - Best Tag Team Match (2010) with Ryusuke Taguchi vs. Makoto Oishi and Shiori Asahi on 17 April
- New Japan Pro-Wrestling
  - IWGP Junior Heavyweight Championship (3 times)
  - IWGP Junior Heavyweight Tag Team Championship (6 times) – with Minoru (2) and Ryusuke Taguchi (4)
  - Best of the Super Juniors (2010, 2013)
  - J Sports Crown Openweight 6 Man Tag Tournament (2010, 2011) – with Ryusuke Taguchi and Hirooki Goto
- New York Post
  - Faction of the Year (2023) as part of The Judgment Day
- NWA UK Hammerlock
  - NWA British Commonwealth Heavyweight Championship (2 times)
- Pro Wrestling Illustrated
  - Faction of the Year (2023) as part of The Judgment Day
  - Ranked No. 3 of the top 500 singles wrestlers in the PWI 500 in 2016
- Revolution Pro Wrestling
  - British Cruiserweight Championship (1 time)
- Rolling Stone
  - NXT Star of the Year (2015)
- Tokyo Sports
  - Best Bout Award (2010) with Ryusuke Taguchi vs. Kenny Omega and Kota Ibushi on 11 October
- Wrestling Observer Newsletter
  - Most Underrated (2018)
- WWE
  - WWE Universal Championship (1 time, inaugural)
  - WWE Intercontinental Championship (2 times)
  - WWE United States Championship (1 time)
  - World/WWE Raw Tag Team Championship (Note: Bálor's first two reigns occurred when the title was known as the Raw Tag Team Championship.) (4 times) – with Damian Priest (2), and JD McDonagh (2)
  - WWE SmackDown Tag Team Championship (2 times) – with Damian Priest
  - NXT Championship (2 times)
  - 17th Grand Slam Champion (under current format; 24th overall)
  - Dusty Rhodes Tag Team Classic (2015) – with Samoa Joe
  - NXT Championship #1 Contender's Tournament (2015)
  - Slammy Award (1 time)
    - Faction of the Year (2024) – as a member of The Judgment Day
  - NXT Year-End Award (3 times)
    - Male Competitor of the Year (2015)
    - Overall Competitor of the Year (2015)
    - Match of the Year (2020) vs. Kyle O'Reilly at NXT TakeOver: 31
