= Memphis Wrestling Hall of Fame =

Professional wrestling hall of fame

The Memphis Wrestling Hall of Fame was a professional wrestling hall of fame maintained by the United States Wrestling Association. The induction ceremony for the Class of 1994, the inaugural inductees into the Hall of Fame, took place at the USWA's "Monday Night Memories", a tribute show, held at the Mid-South Coliseum on March 7, 1994. Tommy Gilbert, a longtime Memphis wrestler, referee and promoter, led the class, which included wrestlers Sputnik Monroe, Al and Don Greene, commentator Lance Russell, and promoter Jerry Jarrett.

The success of the first "Memphis Memories" show, attended by over 8,300 fans, resulted in Randy Hales being made head booker of the USWA. Ironically, Eddie Gilbert, with much of the event revolving around his feud with Jerry Lawler, was upset at having been passed over for the position and left the promotion within a few weeks.

On June 10, 1995, the Class of 1995 was inducted into the Hall of Fame. Like the previous ceremony, it was held during a wrestling event, Memphis Memories II, at the Mid-South Coliseum. Wrestler Jackie Fargo's induction led the Class of 1995, which consisted of wrestlers "Hot Stuff" Eddie Gilbert, Phil Hickerson, Joe LeDuc, and Billy Wicks. In addition to the inductees, the event featured a special "legends introduction" of Memphis wrestling stars including Corsica Joe, Tommy Gilbert, Gypsy Joe, Jerry Jarrett, Sara Lee, Eddie Marlin, Frank Morell, Buddy Wayne, and Jim White. The 1995 edition was attended by 3,850 fans. Only one inductee, Eddie Gilbert, was inducted posthumously. Overall, there were ten inductees; one commentator, and promoter, and eight wrestlers.

The hall of fame ceased being maintained following the close of the USWA in 1997, however, there have been attempts to revive the idea in recent years. Since 2002, the website KayfabeMemories.com has fan-based voting, similar to the Wrestling Observer Newsletter Hall of Fame, for each of the various "territory-era" promotions, including the Memphis wrestling territory, covered by the website. From 2008 to 2010, the website RasslinRiotOnline.com also presented its own version of the Memphis Wrestling Hall of Fame.

In 2017, the Hall of Fame was reactivated. Since then, they hosted two more ceremonies: one in 2018 and one in 2021. A new website was launched in 2021. Memphiswrestlinghalloffame.com

== Inductees ==
Year	Ring name (Real name)^{[a]}	Inducted for	Notes^{[b]}
1994	Tommy Gilbert	Wrestling, Refereeing, and Promoting	Won the NWA Mid-America Heavyweight Championship (1 time), NWA Southern Junior Heavyweight Championship (6 times), NWA Southern Tag Team Championship (Mid-America version) (11 times), NWA Tennessee Tag Team Championship (4 times), and NWA Six-Man Tag Team Championship (2 times)
1994	Al and Don Greene	Wrestling	Won the NWA Southern Tag Team Championship (Mid-America version) (10 times) and NWA World Tag Team Championship (Mid-America version) (1 time)
1994	Christine Jarrett	Promoting	
1994	Jerry Jarrett	Wrestling and Promoting	Owner of the Continental Wrestling Association and the United States Wrestling Association; won the CWA World Tag Team Championship (1 time), NWA Mid-America Tag Team Championship (1 time), NWA Southern Tag Team Championship (Mid-America version) (10 times), NWA World Tag Team Championship (Mid-America version) (1 time), NWA Tennessee Tag Team Championship (1 time)
1994	Lance Russell	Ring announcing and commentating	Longtime ring announcer and commentator for NWA Mid-America and the Continental Wrestling Association; first commentator for the CWA's Championship Wrestling television program
1994	Sputnik Monroe (Rosco Monroe Merrick)	Wrestling	Won the NWA Southern Junior Heavyweight Championship (1 time), NWA Southern Tag Team Championship (Mid-America version) (1 time), NWA Tennessee Heavyweight Championship (2 times), and NWA Tennessee Tag Team Championship (2 times)
1994	Tojo Yamamoto	Wrestling and Manager	ICW United States Tag Team Championship (1 time), AWA Southern Tag Team Championship (1 time), NWA Mid-America Tag Team Championship (12 times), Long time manager in the Memphis territory
1995	Jackie Fargo (Henry Faggart)	Wrestling	Won the AWA Southern Tag Team Championship (1 time), NWA Mid-America Heavyweight Championship (3 times), NWA Mid-America Tag Team Championship (5 times), NWA Six-Man Tag Team Championship (2 times), NWA Southern Junior Heavyweight Championship (5 times), NWA Southern Tag Team Championship (Mid-America version) (22 times), and NWA World Tag Team Championship (Mid-America version) (15 times)
1995	Eddie Gilbert (Thomas Edward Gilbert, Jr.)	Wrestling	Posthumous inductee; won the AWA Southern Heavyweight Championship (1 time), AWA Southern Tag Team Championship (4 times), CWA International Heavyweight Championship (2 times), USWA Heavyweight Championship (1 time), USWA Southern Heavyweight Championship (1 time), USWA Tag Team Championship (1 time), and USWA Unified World Heavyweight Championship (4 times)
1995	Phil Hickerson	Wrestling	Won the AWA Southern Tag Team Championship (9 times), CWA Heavyweight Championship (1 time), CWA International Heavyweight Championship (3 times), NWA Mid-America Tag Team Championship (1 time), NWA Six-Man Tag Team Championship (1 time)
1995	Joe LeDuc (Michel Pigeon)	Wrestling	Won the AWA Southern Heavyweight Championship (2 times), AWA Southern Tag Team Championship (1 time), and NWA Southern Tag Team Championship (Mid-America version) (1 time)
1995	Billy Wicks	Wrestling	Won the NWA Tennessee Heavyweight Championship (2 times) and NWA World Tag Team Championship (Mid-America version); a popular star in Tennessee during the 1950s, his 1959 match against Sputnik Monroe at Russellwood Park was attended by 13,000 fans and held the attendance record for the city of Memphis for nearly 50 years before the Monday Night War period.
2017	Dave Brown	Commentator	Hosted Memphis Wrestling and Championship Wrestling for 25 years
2017	Lance Russell	Commentator	Announcer and commentator in the Memphis region from 1959 to 1997
2017	Jerry Calhoun	Referee	Referee in the Jerry Jarrett Memphis promotion from 1977 to 1987
2017	Bill Dundee	Wrestling	AWA Southern Heavyweight Championship (9 times), AWA Southern Tag Team Championship (14 times), AWA World Tag Team Championship (2 times), CWA International Heavyweight Championship (4 times), CWA International Tag Team Championship (1 time), CWA Southwestern Heavyweight Championship (1 time), CWA World Heavyweight Championship (1 time), CWA World Tag Team Championship (1 time), NWA Mid-America Heavyweight Championship (1 time), NWA Mid-America Tag Team Championship (1 time), NWA Southern Heavyweight Championship (Memphis version) (1 time), NWA Southern Tag Team Championship (Mid-America version) (3 times), NWA United States Junior Heavyweight Championship (2 times)
2017	Tommy, Eddie and Doug Gilbert	Wrestling	Professional wrestling family that often wrestled as a tag team. Tommy and Eddie Gilbert held the NWA Southern Tag Team Championship together twice.
2017	Jimmy Hart	Manager	Long time manager in the Memphis territory
2017	Jerry Lawler	Wrestling and promoting	Won the AWA Southern Heavyweight Championship (58 times), CWA World Heavyweight Championship (1 time), CWA Heavyweight Championship (1 time), NWA Mid-America Heavyweight Championship (3 times), NWA Southern Heavyweight Championship (Memphis version) (7 times)
2017	Koko B. Ware	Wrestling	AWA Southern Tag Team Championship (7 times), NWA Mid-America Heavyweight Championship (6 times), NWA Mid-America Television Championship (1 time), USWA Unified World Heavyweight Championship (2 times), USWA World Tag Team Championship (1 time)
2017	The Midnight Express (Dennis Condrey, Bobby Eaton and Stan Lane with Jim Cornette)	Tag Team	Various versions of the team head the team held the AWA Southern Tag Team Championship, CWA World Tag Team Championship and the NWA World Tag Team Championship
2018	Mick Foley	Wrestling	Won the CWA Tag Team Championship (1 time)
2021	Bert Prentice	Wrestling, promoting and managing	Manager and wrestler for several promotions; also promoted NWA Music City Wrestling and NWA Worldwide.
2021	Randy Hales	Promoting	Founder of Power Pro Wrestling
2021	Kurt Angle	Wrestling	Won the PPW Heavyweight Championship (1 time)
2021	Scott Steiner	Wrestling	Won the CWA Tag Team Championship (3 times).
2021	Tommy Rich	Wrestling	Won the AWA Southern Heavyweight Championship (2 times), AWA Southern Tag Team Championship (4 times), CWA International Heavyweight Championship (1 time), CWA World Tag Team Championship (2 times), NWA Mid-America Heavyweight Championship (2 times), NWA Six-Man Tag Team Championship (2 times), NWA Southern Heavyweight Championship (Memphis version) (2 times), NWA United States Tag Team Championship (Mid-America version) (1 time)
2021	Tony Falk	Wrestling	Won the NWA Mid-America Heavyweight Championship (1 time), USWA Television Championship (1 time)
2021	Reggie B. Fine	Wrestling	Won the USWA Tag Team Championship (1 time)
2021	Downtown Bruno	Managing	Long time manager in the Memphis territory
2022	Don Bass	Wrestling	
2022	The Snowman	Wrestling	
2022	Big Red	Wrestling	
2022	Kerry Von Erich	Wrestling	
2022	Gypsy Joe	Wrestling	
2022	Nick Gulas	Promoting	
2022	Guy Coffey	Promoting	
2022	Eddie Marlin	Wrestling and Promoting	
2022	The Moondogs (Spot, Rex and Cujo and Spike)	Wrestling	
2022	Dr. Frank	Wrestling	
2022	Lord Humongous	Wrestling	
2022	Ox Baker	Wrestling	
2022	Mongolian Stomper	Wrestling	
2022	Killer Karl Krupp	Wrestling	
2022	Ricky Gibson	Wrestling	
2022	Leon Spinks	*Celebrity Wing	
2022	Curt Hennig	Wrestling	
2022	Nick Bockwinkel	Wrestling	
2022	Yokozuna	Wrestling	
2022	Mabel	Wrestling	
2022	King Kong Bundy	Wrestling	
2022	Plowboy Frazier	Wrestling	
2022	San Diego Chicken	*Celebrity Wing	
2022	Junkyard Dog	Wrestling	
2022	The Road Warriors (Hawk and Animal)	Wrestling	
2022	Bam Bam Bigelow	Wrestling	
2022	Bob Armstrong	Wrestling	
2022	Buddy Wayne	Wrestling	
2022	Paul Morton	Referee	
2022	Luna Vachon	Wrestling	
2022	Sherri Martel	Wrestling	
2022	Candi Devine	Wrestling	
2022	Scott Bowden	Wrestling	
2022	Randy Savage	Wrestling	
2022	Rick Rude	Wrestling	
2022	Jim Neidhart	Wrestling	
2022	Andy Kaufman	Entertainer and performance artist	
2022	Billy Joe Travis	Wrestling	
2022	Buddy Landel	Wrestling	
2022	Scott Hall	Wrestling	
2022	Dream Machine	Wrestling	
2022	Adam West	*Celebrity Wing	
2022	Corey Maclin	Announcer	
2022	Brickhouse Brown	Wrestling	
2022	Kamala	Wrestling	
2022	Rocky Johnson	Wrestling	
2022	Tracy Smothers	Wrestling	
2022	Brian Christopher	Wrestling	
2024	Jimmy Valiant	Wrestling	
2024	The Rock 'n' Roll Express (Ricky Morton and Robert Gibson) (Richard Morton and Ruben Cain)	Wrestling	
2024	PG-13 (J. C. Ice and Wolfie D) (James Dundee and Kelly Warren Wolfe)	Wrestling	
2024	The Spellbinder	Wrestling	
2024	Sir Mo	Wrestling	
2024	Michael Saint John	Ring announcing	
2024	Terry Golden	Promoting	
2024	Dirty White Boy	Wrestling	
2024	Tom Prichard	Wrestling	
2024	Nightmare Danny Davis	Wrestling	

== Footnotes ==
- ^{a} – Entries without a birth name indicates that the inductee did not perform under a ring name.
- ^{b} – This section mainly lists the major accomplishments of each inductee in the Memphis wrestling territory.

== See also ==
- List of professional wrestling halls of fame
