= First Family (professional wrestling) =

Professional wrestling stable

Stable
- Members: Jimmy Hart (manager); CWA - See Below; WCW - See Below

The First Family was the name of three professional wrestling stables led by Jimmy Hart, first in the late-1970s and early-1980s in the Memphis, Tennessee-based Continental Wrestling Association, then in the late-1980s in the World Wrestling Federation, and finally in the late-1990s in World Championship Wrestling.

== Incarnations ==
=== Continental Wrestling Association ===
The original First Family was founded in the late 1970s by Hart to take the CWA title from his former protégé, Jerry Lawler. The group extensively feuded with Lawler into the 1980s, a time particularly remembered for comedian Andy Kaufman's rivalry with Lawler.

Members

- Norvell Austin
- Ox Baker
- King Kong Bundy
- Dennis Condrey
- Sabu the Wildman
- Chick Donovan
- Bobby Eaton
- Wayne Ferris
- Buddy Landel
- Austin Idol
- Masao Ito
- Kamala
- Andy Kaufman
- Larry Latham
- Kendo Nagasaki
- Jim Neidhart
- Lanny Poffo
- The Iron Sheik
- Kevin Sullivan
- Russian Invader
- Len Denton
- The Bruise Brothers (Porkchop Cash and Dream Machine)
- Tony Anthony
- Koko Ware
- Rick Rude
- Randy Savage
- Eddie Gilbert
- Tommy Rich
- Lucifer
- The Prince Of Darkness
- Nightmare
- Speed

=== World Wrestling Federation ===
In 1985, When Hart got hired by WWF, he began becoming a manager of wrestlers including Greg Valentine and King Kong Bundy. He briefly co-managed The Dream Team (Beefcake and Valentine) until he was phased out and gave full control to Johnny Valiant. In September 1985, Hart traded Bundy to manager Bobby Heenan in exchange for Adrian Adonis and The Missing Link.

Members

- Greg Valentine
- King Kong Bundy
- Brutus Beefcake
- Adrian Adonis
- The Missing Link
- Terry Funk
- Hoss Funk
- Bret Hart
- Jim Neidhart
- Danny Davis
- The Honky Tonk Man
- The Glamour Girls (Leilani Kai and Judy Martin)
- Jacques Rougeau/The Mountie
- Raymond Rougeau
- Dino Bravo
- Earthquake
- Brian Knobbs
- Jerry Sags
- Typhoon
- Ted DiBiase
- Irwin R. Schyster
- Hulk Hogan

=== World Championship Wrestling ===
Many years later, after the demise of the Dungeon of Doom in World Championship Wrestling (WCW) in 1997, Hart resurrected the First Family concept the following year, bringing together several mid-card performers. This short-lived group featured entirely different wrestlers than the Memphis version of the 1970s and included former Dungeon members.

They frequently appeared on WCW programs including WCW Monday Nitro and primarily feuded with Fit Finlay. Hugh Morrus and Brian Knobbs often tagged together, defeating members of Revolution at 1999's Fall Brawl and making a losing effort in a three-way WCW World Tag Team Championship contest at Halloween Havoc.

With an instrumental version of "The Zoo" as their entrance theme, the stable featured a variety of colorful wrestling personalities with unique ring styles: Jerry Flynn demonstrated martial arts strikes and submissions while Brian Knobbs utilized a rougher brawling style. Considering publicity photos were taken of the group, WCW's First Family was likely intended for a substantial run; however, according to Hart, the group quickly disbanded due to injuries sustained by numerous members as well as new bookers hired by WCW. In the aftermath of The First Family, Knobbs and Hart pursued WCW's hardcore scene that was on the rise in late-1999.

Members

- Meng
- Barbarian
- Jerry Flynn
- Brian Knobbs
- Hugh Morrus

== Championships and accomplishments ==
Continental Wrestling Association

- AWA International Heavyweight Championship (7 times) – Tommy Rich (1), Eddie Gilbert (2), Austin Idol (4)
- NWA Mid-America Heavyweight Championship (14 times) – Tommy Rich (1), Bobby Eaton (10), Randy Savage (3)
- AWA Southern Heavyweight Championship (12 times) – Tommy Rich (5), Jimmy Hart (1), Chick Donovan (1), King Kong Bundy (1), Austin Idol (3), Rick Rude (1)
- AWA Southern Tag Team Championship (1 time) – King Kong Bundy and Rick Rude
- AWA Southern Tag Team Championship (2 times) Porkchop Cash and Dream Machine
- CWA World Tag Team Championship (1 time) Dennis Condrey and Norvell Austin
