= NWA Tennessee Heavyweight Championship =

Professional wrestling championship

Details
- Promotion: NWA Mid-America (1949–1950); NWA Top Rope (2005–2013)
- Date established: June 29, 1959; November 2, 2005
- Date retired: October, 1960; August, 2013

The NWA Tennessee Heavyweight Championship was the primary championship in the National Wrestling Alliance territory promotion NWA Top Rope, based in Lebanon, Tennessee. The Championship was created in 2005 and was active until 2013 when NWA Top Rope closed. That version of the championship was preceded by the original NWA Tennessee Heavyweight Championship that existed from the late 1950s into the 1960s, promoted by NWA Mid-America. Because the championship is a professional wrestling championship, it is not won or lost competitively but instead by the decision of the bookers of a wrestling promotion. The championship is awarded after the chosen wrestler "wins" a match to maintain the illusion that professional wrestling is a competitive sport.

== Title history ==
=== NWA Mid-America ===
Key
No.	Overall reign number
Reign	Reign number for the specific champion
Days	Number of days held

No.	Champion	Championship change			Reign statistics		Notes	Ref.
No.	Champion	Date	Event	Location	Reign	Days	Notes	Ref.
1	Billy Wicks	June 29, 1959	Mid-America show	Memphis, Tennessee	1	35	Defeated Sputnik Monroe in a tournament final to become the first champion.	
2	Sputnik Monroe	August 3, 1959	Mid-America show	Memphis, Tennessee	1	7		
3	Billy Wicks	August 10, 1959	Mid-America show	Memphis, Tennessee	2	231		
4	Sputnik Monroe	March 28, 1960	Mid-America show	Memphis, Tennessee	2	(Note: The date the championship dropped lost has not been documented which means the championship reign lasted anywhere between 1 day and 305 days.)		
—	Deactivated	1960	—	—	—	—	Championship abandoned.	

=== Continental Championship Wrestling / USA Championship Wrestling ===
Key
No.	Overall reign number
Reign	Reign number for the specific champion
Days	Number of days held

No.	Champion	Championship change			Reign statistics		Notes	Ref.
No.	Champion	Date	Event	Location	Reign	Days	Notes	Ref.
1	Doug Furnas	July 17, 1987	CCW show	Knoxville, Tennessee	1	246	Defeated Tony Anthony in a tournament final to become champion. Title moved from CCW to USA Championship Wrestling in March 1988.	
2	Buddy Landell	March 19, 1988	USAC show	Knoxville, Tennessee	1	70		
3	Wendell Cooley	May 28, 1988	USAC show	Knoxville, Tennessee	1	8		
4	Buddy Landell	June 5, 1988	USAC show	Knoxville, Tennessee	2	47		
5	Wendell Cooley	July 22, 1988	USAC show	Knoxville, Tennessee	2	(Note: The date the championship dropped lost has not been documented which means the championship reign lasted anywhere between 1 day and 40 days.)		
—	Deactivated	August 1988	—	—	—	—	Championship abandoned when USA Championship Wrestling closes.	

=== NWA Top Rope ===
Key
No.	Overall reign number
Reign	Reign number for the specific champion
Days	Number of days held

No.	Champion	Championship change			Reign statistics		Notes	Ref.
No.	Champion	Date	Event	Location	Reign	Days	Notes	Ref.
1	Rick Santel	November 12, 2005	NWA Top Rope show	Lebanon, Tennessee	1	(Note: The date the championship was lost has not been documented which means the championship reign lasted anywhere between 81 days and 108 days.)	Defeated Jason James and Jason Brisbane in a three-way match to become the first champion in NWA Top Rope.	
—	Vacated	February 2006	—	—	—	—	Championship vacated due to injuries to Santel	
2	Kory Williams	February 2006	NWA Top Rope show	(Note: The location of the match was not captured as part of the championship documentation.)	1	(Note: The date the championship was won has not been documented which means the championship reign lasted anywhere between 214 days and 241 days.)	Williams was awarded the reigning NWA Top Rope Southern Heavyweight Champion.	
3	Casey Kage	September 30, 2006	NWA Top Rope show	Lebanon, Tennessee	1	119	This was a Texas Bullrope match.	
4	Brian Rivers	October 28, 2006	Nightmare Ted Allen's 2-day event	Tuscaloosa, Alabama	1	1	Defeated Casey Kage in a special challenge match	
5	Casey Kage	October 29, 2006	Nightmare Ted Allen's 2-day event	Tuscaloosa, Alabama	2	119	Defeated Brian Rivers to start 2nd reign	
—	Vacated	January 27, 2007	—	—	—	—	Championship vacated when Casey Kage and manager Jay West left NWA Top Rope over pay disputes.	
6	Vic the Bruiser	February 24, 2007	NWA Top Rope show	Lebanon, Tennessee	1	84	Won a battle royal to win the vacant title	
7	Kory Wiliams	May 19, 2007	NWA Top Rope show	Lebanon, Tennessee	2	42		
8	Vic the Bruiser	June 30, 2007	NWA Top Rope show	Lebanon, Tennessee	2	(Note: The date the championship was lost has not been documented which means the championship reign lasted anywhere between 1 day and 0 days.)		
9	Gary Valiant	June 2007	NWA Top Rope show	Lebanon, Tennessee	1	(Note: The date the championship was lost has not been documented which means the championship reign lasted anywhere between 457 days and 398 days.)		
10	Vic the Bruiser	August 2008	NWA Top Rope show		3	(Note: The date the championship was won and lost has not been documented which means the championship reign lasted anywhere between 1 day and 304 days.)	Still billed as champion on November 20, 2008	
Championship history is unrecorded from August 2008 to June 2, 2009 (NLT).
11	Vordell Walker	June 2, 2009 (NLT)	NWA Top Rope show		1	(Note: The date the championship was won and lost has not been documented which means the championship reign lasted anywhere between 1 day and 462 days.)		
Championship history is unrecorded from June 2, 2009 (NLT) to November 7, 2009.
—	Vacated	November 7, 2009	—	—	—	—	Championship vacated for undocumented reasons.	
Championship history is unrecorded from November 7, 2009 to March 1, 2010 (NLT).
12	Gary Valiant	March 1, 2010 (NLT)	NWA Top Rope show		2	(Note: The date the championship was won has not been documented which means the championship reign lasted anywhere between 38 days and 147 days.)		
13	Orion Bishop	April 8, 2010	NWA Top Rope show	Nashville, Tennessee	1	(Note: The date the championship was lost has not been documented which means the championship reign lasted anywhere between 1 day and 81 days.)		
Championship history is unrecorded from April 8, 2010 to June 28, 2010 (NLT).
14	Jeff Daniels	June 28, 2010 (NLT)	NWA Top Rope show		1	(Note: The date the championship was won has not been documented which means the championship reign lasted anywhere between 138 days and 218 days.)		
15	Arrick Andrews	November 13, 2010	NWA Top Rope show	Mt. Juliet, Tennessee	1	140		
—	Vacated	April 2, 2011	—	—	—	—	Championship vacated for undocumented reasons.	
16	Arrick Andrews	May 28, 2011	NWA Top Rope show	Lebanon, Tennessee	2	98	Won a tournament.	
17	Kevin Jones	September 3, 2011	NWA Top Rope show	Lebanon, Tennessee	1	21		
18	Arrick Andrews	September 24, 2011	NWA Top Rope show	Lebanon, Tennessee	3	92		
19	Derek Neal	December 25, 2011	NWA Top Rope show	Lebanon, Tennessee	1	27		
20	Hammerjack	January 21, 2012	NWA Top Rope show	Lebanon, Tennessee	1	(Note: The date the championship was lost has not been documented which means the championship reign lasted anywhere between 1 day and 153 days.)	Still billed as champion on February 26, 2012	
Championship history is unrecorded from January 21, 2012 to June 22, 2012 (NLT).
21	Arrick Andrews	June 22, 2012 (NLT)		NWA Top Rope show	4	(Note: The date the championship was won has not been documented which means the championship reign lasted anywhere between 29 days and 145 days.)		
22	Chris Michaels	July 21, 2012	NWA Top Rope show	Lebanon, Tennessee	1	(Note: The date the championship was lost has not been documented which means the championship reign lasted anywhere between 1 day and 10 days.)		
—	Vacated	July 2012	—	—	—	—	Championship vacated for undocumented reasons.	
24	Arrick Andrews	July 28, 2012	NWA Top Rope show	Lebanon, Tennessee	5	(Note: The date the championship was abandoned has not been documented which means the championship reign lasted anywhere between 369 days and 399 days.)	Defeated Tyler Gage in 4-man tournament final;	
—	Deactivated	August 2013	—	—	—	—	Championship abandoned when NWA Top Rope closed.	

== See also ==
- List of National Wrestling Alliance championships
