= Jimmy Valiant =

American professional wrestler (born 1942)

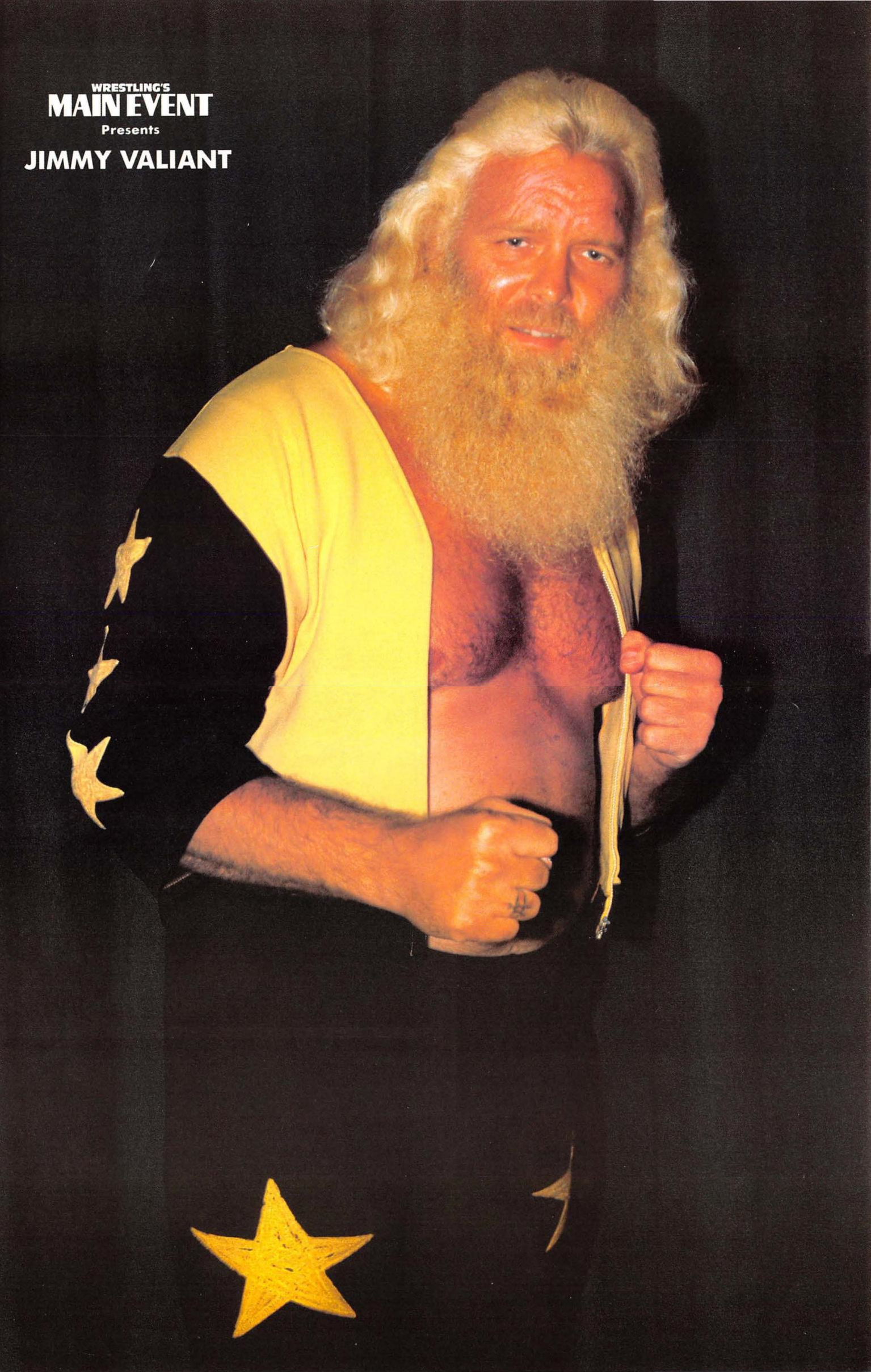
- Valiant, circa 1983

Personal information
- Born: James Harold Fanning; August 6, 1942 (age 83) Tullahoma, Tennessee, U.S.

Professional wrestling career
- Ring name(s): Charlie Brown; Jimmy Valiant; Big Jim Vallen; King James Valiant "Gentleman" Jim Valiant; Boogie Woogie Man; Handsome Jimmy
- Billed height: 6 ft 3 in (191 cm)
- Billed weight: 251 lb (114 kg)
- Billed from: New York City (as Jimmy Valiant) "Outta Town" (as Charlie Brown)
- Trained by: Verne Gagne
- Debut: May 5, 1964
- Retired: April 25, 2026

James Harold Fanning (born August 6, 1942) is an American professional wrestler, better known by his ring name "Handsome" Jimmy Valiant.

== Early life ==
Fanning was born in Tullahoma, Tennessee as the youngest of five children of James and Effie Fanning.

== Professional wrestling career ==
Fanning started wrestling in 1964 as "Big Jim Vallen". He went to the World Wide Wrestling Federation in the 1970s as "Handsome Jimmy Valiant" and formed a team with Johnny Valiant that would dominate the tag team scene for a while as WWWF Tag Team champions. In the later 1960s in the World Wrestling Association, they were managed by Bobby Heenan.

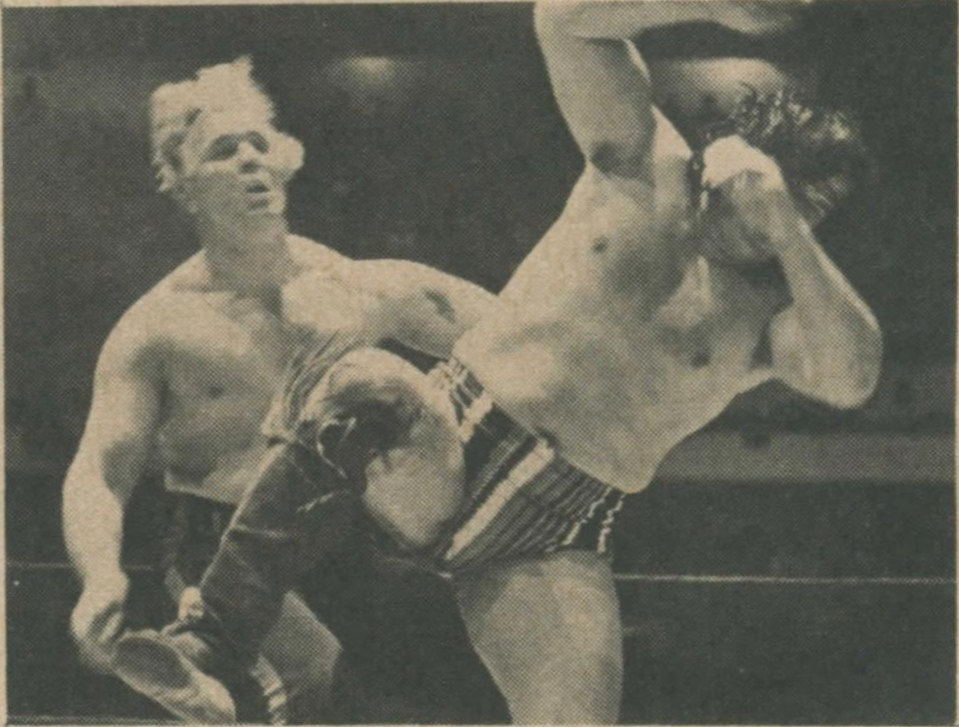
Valiant (left) in a 1972 match against Chief Jay Strongbow

Valiant had entered the WWWF in 1971 as a babyface, originally known as "Gentleman Jim Valiant," but quickly switched to a heel. He had title matches against champion Pedro Morales in secondary arenas, such as Philadelphia, and feuded with short-term tag partner Chief Jay Strongbow. Jimmy and his kayfabe brother Johnny Valiant held the tag belts from 1974 to 1975 and main evented Madison Square Garden against Chief Jay Strongbow and Bruno Sammartino (Strongbow and Sammartino won 2 out of 3 falls, but one fall via disqualification; hence the belts didn't change hands).

During the late 1970s to early 1980s, Valiant was a central player in the Memphis, Tennessee wrestling scene. He feuded regularly with Jerry Lawler and teamed with Bill Dundee to dominate the tag team matches of that time. He even recorded a song, "The Ballad of Handsome Jimmy", which was used in wrestling arenas as his entry music and became a mainstay on some Memphis radio stations for a few years. Despite the Memphis promotion desperately wanting to keep him in Memphis full-time, even offering to buy him a house in Memphis according to Jerry Lawler's biography, Valiant decided to move on after holding the AWA Southern Heavyweight Championship for roughly a year. Valiant also spent a brief amount of time in Jim Crockett Promotions in the late 1970s as the heel "King James Valiant" managed by Lord Alfred Hayes.

In 1979, Jimmy returned to the WWWF with Johnny occasionally wrestling and went into the manager role. He managed Johnny and Jerry Valiant as they won the tag belts.

In the early 1980s, Valiant returned as a babyface to National Wrestling Alliance's Jim Crockett Promotions as "Boogie Woogie Man" Jimmy Valiant and called his fans "the Street People". His theme music around this time was "Boy From New York City", by The Manhattan Transfer. While in Jim Crockett Promotions, he would sometimes appear in a black bandit-style mask and call himself "Charlie Brown from Outta Town". This usually occurred when Valiant was (in kayfabe) banned from wrestling. Charlie Brown was billed as someone other than Valiant, despite "Brown" having Valiant's legendarily prodigious beard.

January 1984, Valiant was attacked by Paul Jones and The Assassins. They tied him to the wrestling ring ropes so that Jones could cut his beard off. This led to a grudge match with hyped supershow called 'Boogie Man Jam '84' in Greensboro, North Carolina. For this match, Dusty Rhodes was in Valiant's corner and tied by a rope to Paul Jones. Valiant defeated Assassin II, who was unmasked and revealed as Hercules Hernandez. Due to the beard cutting attack, he feuded heavily with Paul Jones and his army of wrestlers, from 1984 through to late 1986. This army of wrestlers included The Barbarian, Baron von Raschke, Teijo Khan, and The Assassins. During this three-year feud, Valiant received help from Héctor Guerrero and "Raging Bull" Manny Fernandez. Although Jimmy Valiant would lose a Loser Leaves Town Tuxedo Street Fight to Paul Jones at Starrcade 1984 in Greensboro, North Carolina the feud with many from the Paul Jones stable continued, which would come to include Abdullah The Butcher. In 1985, Valiant and Ragin' Bull Manny Fernandez formed a team called B and B Connection ("Boogie Woogie" and "Bull").

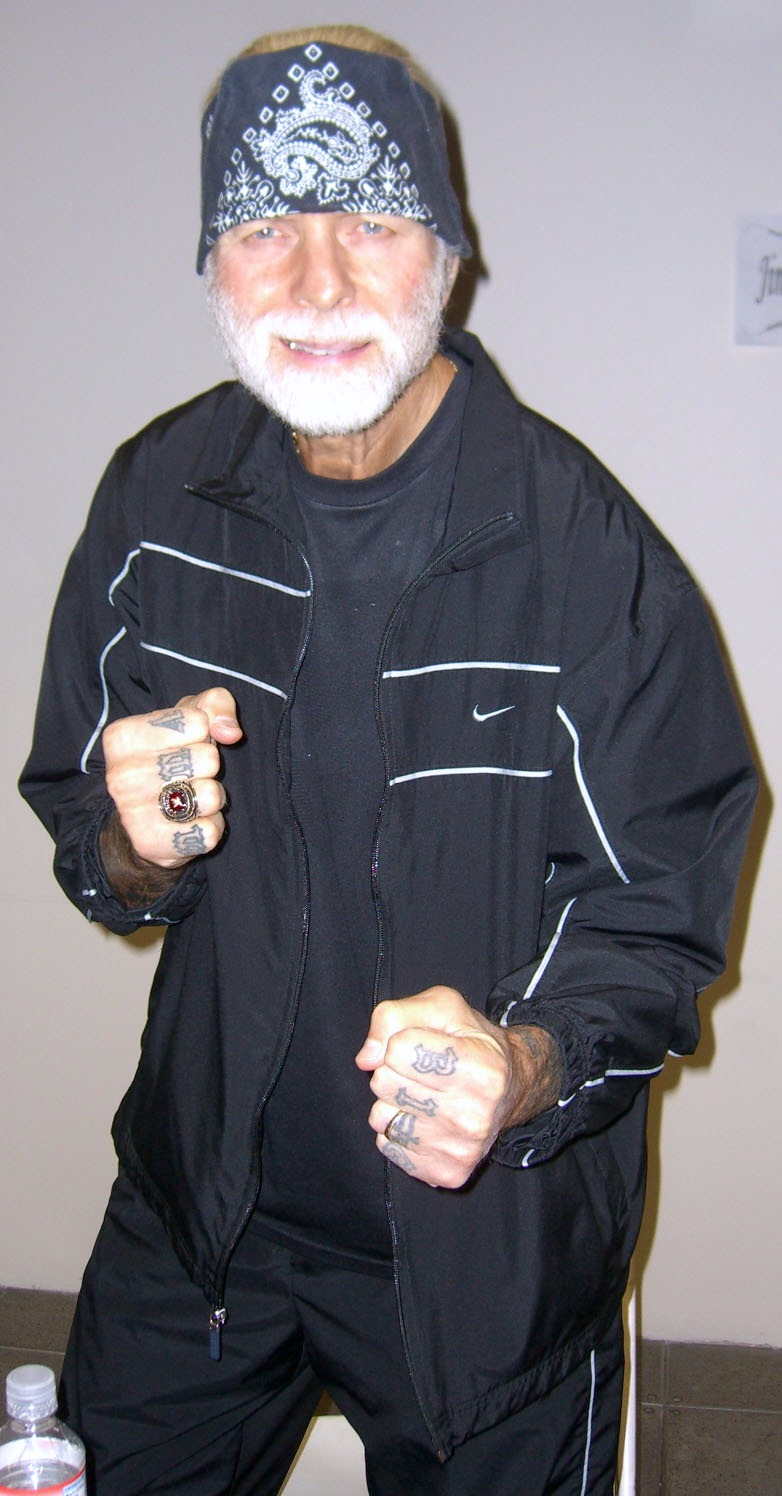
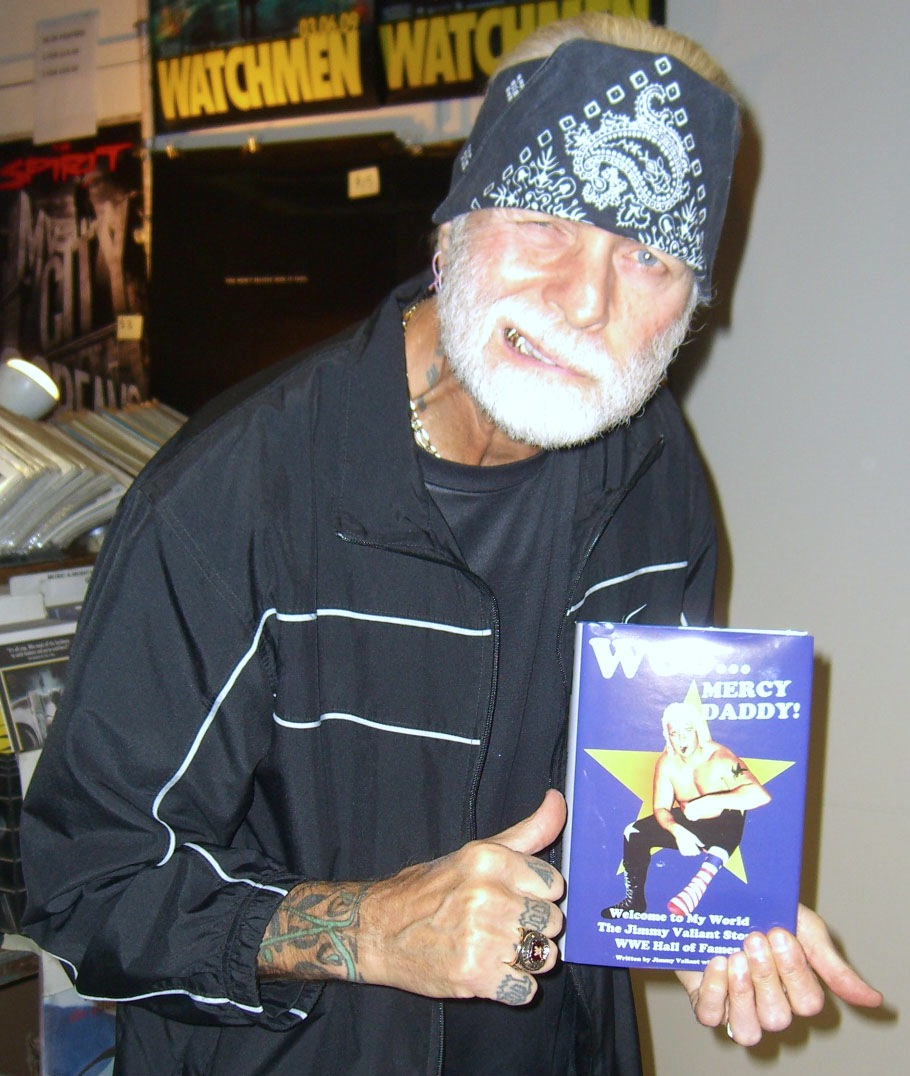
Valiant in 2008

During The Great American Bash 1986 summer shows, Paul Jones adopted a military style look in his long feud with Valiant and labeled his stable of wrestlers The Army. Valiant would beat Shaska Whatley in a hair vs hair match, but with outside interference lost a hair vs hair match to Paul Jones only weeks later. In the fall of 1986, the Raging Bull Manny Fernandez, Valiant's best friend accepted Jones' money and turned on Valiant, starting a feud between the two. Paul Jones at this point shortened his army to his newly acquired tag team of Ragin Bull and Rick Rude. The war between Valiant and Paul Jones climaxed at Starrcade '86: The Skywalkers with Valiant putting up the hair of his valet Big Mama against the hair of Paul Jones in a No DQ Match which Valiant won (while the Ragin Bull was placed in a cage above the ring).

In the late 1980s, he teamed with Hector Guerrero (then masked as Laser Tron) and Bugsy McGraw and feuded with The New Breed. When Jim Crockett Promotions became World Championship Wrestling, Valiant left and returned to Memphis to wrestle in the United States Wrestling Association. In 1990 he twice won the USWA Unified World Heavyweight Championship from Jerry Lawler, losing it back to him both times.

On February 8, 2020, he wrestled for WrestlePro in Rahway, New Jersey, where he teamed with Buster Jackson to defeat the team of Colt Cabana and CPA.

On May 14, 2022, Valiant came out of retirement at 79 years old winning a 6-man tag team match at Patriotic Wrestling Federation in York, South Carolina. On August 13, 2023, he then wrestled for Revolution Wrestling Authority in High Point, North Carolina, teaming with Rob McBride in a 3-on-2 Handicap Match to defeat the team of Jonny Fairplay, Julian Strauss, and Steven Frye.

Valiant debuted for Beside The Ring Wrestling in Mountain City on August 31, 2024. After unveiling the inaugural Beside The Ring Championship, Valiant excited the crowd before being interrupted by Evan Golden. On November 1, 2025, Golden interrupted Valiant on the microphone at All Star Entertainment, after which Valiant struck him with a strap.

He currently wrestles under the ACW Banner (American Championship Wrestling) around the Roanoke Virginia Area.

Valiant is a trainer at Boogie's Wrestling Camp located in Shawsville, Virginia. He continues to appear at independent shows signing autographs while his students appear in a few matches on the card. He keeps in touch with fans through his official Weekly website.

Most recently, Valiant lent his name to a foreword for a fiction novel called "Only The Beginning" by his friend Jason Strecker. The book is not wrestling-related, but tells a story set in the 1980s about a girl's life during high school. It also has a foreword by wrestler Nikolai Volkoff.

On April 25, 2026, Valiant wrestled a final retirement match in Lancaster, South Carolina, dubbed Boogie's Last Dance. Valiant, Magnet Man and Moonshine Express defeated VSP and Deon Johnson in an eight-man tag team match.

== Personal life ==
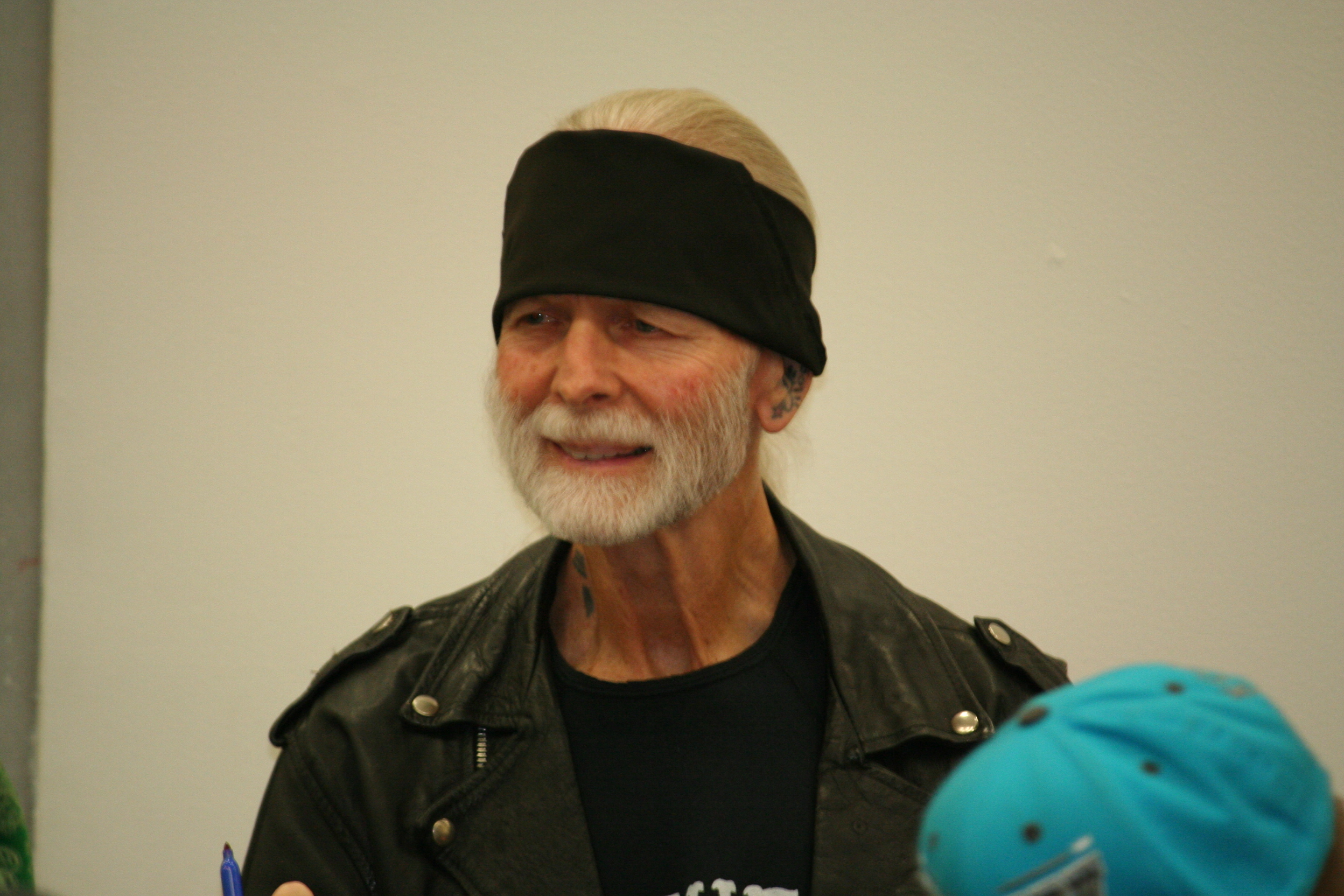
Valiant at WrestleCade 2012

Fanning married Clara, with whom he fathered three children: Robin, Rhonda, and Dana. Rhonda died in 2016. With Monika, he has his first son Todd. With Felicia, he has his youngest son Handsome. He is now married to Angel. He has six grandchildren: Lonna, Jenae, Beau, Chassie, Clarissa and Delilah.

== Bibliography ==
- "Woo...Mercy Daddy!" Welcome to My World: The Jimmy Valiant Story (2005)

== Championships and accomplishments ==
- All American Wrestling
  - AAW Heavyweight Championship (5 times)
- All Pro Wrestling
  - APW Heavyweight Championship (1 time)
- Allied Independent Wrestling Federations
  - AIWF Hall Of Fame (Class Of 2016)
  - AIWF Mid-Atlantic Tag Team Championship (1 time) – with Rob Mcbride
- American Championship Wrestling
  - ACW Universal Tag Team Championship (1 time) – with Bob Ross
- Big Time Wrestling (San Francisco)
  - NWA World Tag Team Championship (San Francisco version) (1 time) – with Johnny Valiant
- Capital City Wrestling Alliance
  - CCWA Tag Team Championship (1 time) with Keith Ashley
- Cauliflower Alley Club
  - Other honoree (1997)
- Championship Pro Wrestling
  - CPW Heavyweight Championship (1 time)
- Championship Wrestling from Florida
  - NWA Florida Tag Team Championship (1 time) – with Johnny Valiant
  - NWA United States Tag Team Championship (Florida version) (1 time) – with Johnny Valiant
- Georgia Championship Wrestling
  - NWA Georgia Tag Team Championship (1 time) – with Johnny Valiant
- Maple Leaf Wrestling
  - NWA Television Championship (Toronto version) (2 times)
- Memphis Wrestling Hall of Fame
  - Class of 2024
- Mid-Atlantic Championship Wrestling
  - NWA Television Championship (2 times)
- National Wrestling Alliance
  - NWA Legends Hall of Heroes (2016)
- North American Wrestling Alliance
  - NAWA Heavyweight Championship (1 time)
  - NAWA Tag Team Championship |1 time) – with Hangman Bruce Pobanz
- New England Pro Wrestling Hall of Fame
  - Class of 2018
- Northern Wrestling Federation
  - NWF Heavyweight Championship (1 time)
- NWA Mid-America / Continental Wrestling Association
  - AWA Southern Heavyweight Championship (5 times)
  - AWA Southern Tag Team Championship (1 time) – with Rocky Johnson
  - CWA Tag Team Championship (3 times) – with Bill Dundee (2) and Don Carson (1)
  - NWA Mid-America Heavyweight Championship (1 time)
  - NWA Southern Heavyweight Championship (Memphis version) (1 time)
- Pro Wrestling Illustrated
  - PWI Tag Team of the Year award in 1974 – with Johnny Valiant
  - PWI ranked him # 274 of the 500 best singles wrestlers during the "PWI Years" in 2003.
  - St. Louis Wrestling Hall of Fame 2027.
- Southern Championship Wrestling
  - SCW Hall of Fame (Class of 1997)
- United States Wrestling Association
  - USWA Southern Heavyweight Championship (1 time)
  - USWA Unified World Heavyweight Championship (2 times)
- World Wide Wrestling Federation / World Wrestling Federation
  - WWWF World Tag Team Championship (1 time) – with Johnny Valiant
  - Cadillac Tournament winner (1)
  - WWF Hall of Fame (Class of 1996) – with Johnny Valiant
- World Wrestling Association
  - WWA World Heavyweight Championship (1 time)
  - WWA World Tag Team Championship (4 times) – with Johnny Valiant
- Wrestling Observer Newsletter
  - Worst Tag Team (1987) with Bugsy McGraw
