= Wendell Cooley =

American professional wrestler (born 1961)

Personal information
- Born: Wendell Cooley; April 25, 1961 (age 65) Milton, Florida

Professional wrestling career
- Ring name(s): Wendell Cooley; Rick Casey; Heartbreaker Apollo
- Billed height: 6 ft 1 in (185 cm)
- Billed weight: 220 lb (100 kg)
- Billed from: San Antonio, Texas
- Trained by: Robert Fuller
- Debut: 1981
- Retired: 2019

Wendell Cooley (born April 25, 1961) is an American retired professional wrestler, best known as Wildcat Wendell Cooley and sometimes Rick Casey. He appeared in the Southern territories for Continental Wrestling Association, Continental Championship Wrestling, Southwest Championship Wrestling, Mid-South Wrestling, and World Championship Wrestling. He also is known for teaming with Frankie Lancaster as the Heartbreakers.

== Professional wrestling career ==
Cooley made his professional wrestling debut in 1981. On August 31, 1985, while wrestling for Bill Watt's Mid-South Wrestling, Cooley teamed with Al Perez and defeated the team of "Dr. Death" Steve Williams and Bruiser Bob Sweetan for the Mid-South Tag Team Championship. Sweetan was substituting for Ted DiBiase while DiBiase was touring Japan. On February 2, 1986, Cooley won his first singles title in Memphis, Tennessee defeating Dutch Mantel for the AWA International Heavyweight Championship. Cooley won a tournament defeating Jerry Stubbs for the vacated NWA Alabama Heavyweight Championship. He would win the title two more times feuding with Tony Anthony.

Cooley was also a member of the Stud Stable in Alabama from 1986 to 1988.

On December 28, 1987, Cooley won a Mink Coat Tournament defeating Dutch Mantel in the finals in Birmingham, Alabama for Continental Championship Wrestling.

After both Continental Wrestling Association and Continental Championship Wrestling in 1989, Cooley worked for World Championship Wrestling (WCW) based in Atlanta in 1990 as a jobber to the stars.

In 1991, he formed a tag team with Frankie Lancaster as the Heartbreakers in Puerto Rico with Cooley as Apollo and Lancaster as Adonis. They won the WWC World Tag Team Championship defeating El Bronco and Invader #1. The Heartbreakers won the title two more times feuding with Rex King and Ricky Santana.

In 1992, they made an appearance in the World Wrestling Federation losing to The Bushwhackers. The following year, Lancaster joined Austin Idol's short-lived USA Wrestling promotion based in Dothan, Alabama. He and Steve Armstrong, teaming as "The Young Bucks", defeated Simply Devine (Rex King & Steve Doll) on April 3, 1993, in a tournament final to become the inaugural USA Tag Team Champions. They held the belts until the promotion closed a few months later.

After Frankie Lancaster left WCW in 2000, The Heartbreakers reunited in the independent circuit and continued teaming up occasionally.

Cooley worked for NWA Wrestle Birmingham. He won the Texas Heavyweight Title defeating Tom Prichard on November 22, 2014, at GCW Southern Legends Fanfest in Pell City, Alabama.

He retired from wrestling in 2019.

== Personal life ==
Cooley appeared in the children's fiction book My Father, the Angel of Death published in 2006.

A documentary called Wildcat Wendell Cooley was released in 2016 directed by Brian Logan. It features Jerry Lawler, Tom Prichard, Tony Anthony and Koko B. Ware.

== Championships and accomplishments ==
- Mid-South Wrestling
  - Mid-South Tag Team Championship (1 time) - with Al Perez
- NWA Mid-America / Continental Wrestling Association
  - CWA International Heavyweight Championship (1 time)
  - CWA Heavyweight Championship (2 times)
- Southwest Championship Wrestling
  - SCW Southwest Tag Team Championship (1 time) – with Jerry Oske
- Southeastern Championship Wrestling
  - NWA Southeastern Heavyweight Championship (Northern Division) (2 times)
  - NWA Alabama Heavyweight Championship (3 times)
- USA Wrestling
  - USA Tag Team Championship (1 time) - with Steve Armstrong
- World Wrestling Council
  - WWC World Tag Team Championship (3 times) - with Frankie Lancaster
- Pro Wrestling Illustrated
  - PWI ranked Wendell Cooley # 140 of the 500 best singles wrestlers of the PWI 500 in 1991
  - PWI Most Improved Wrestler of the Year Third Runner Up 1986
