= Billy Travis =

American professional wrestler (1961–2002)

- Billy "Joe" Travis in 1997

Personal information
- Born: Gary Keith Mize; April 28, 1961 Richmond, Kentucky, U.S.
- Died: November 23, 2002 (aged 41) Corbin, Kentucky, U.S.

Professional wrestling career
- Ring name(s): Billy Travis; Billy Joe Travis; B.T. Express
- Billed height: 6 ft 1 in (185 cm)
- Billed weight: 229 lb (104 kg)
- Trained by: Dale Mann
- Debut: 1980

Gary Keith Mize (April 28, 1961 – November 23, 2002), better known by his ring name Billy Travis or Billy Joe Travis, was an American professional wrestler. He is most known for his time in Continental Wrestling Association (CWA) and the United States Wrestling Association (USWA), holding several tag team championships.

== Professional wrestling career ==
Mize began his career in 1980 and wrestled for Dale Mann's MWA Championship Wrestling as a face under the ring name Billy Travis. He formed a tag team with Mike Mann known collectively as the Southern Sensations, winning the MWA Tag Team Championship. In 1984, Travis made several appearances in the World Wrestling Federation (WWF) as a jobber.

He then began working in the Memphis, Tennessee area for the Continental Wrestling Association (CWA) as "Billy Joe Travis", adopting a conceited, egotistical heel ("bad guy") ring character. Travis teamed up with Ron Sexton to form a team known as "Hot Property", the young duo was paired up with veteran Buddy Wayne to act as their manager. Travis also briefly teamed with Norvell Austin during the summer of 1985 as he worked a storyline feud with The Fabulous Ones (Stan Lane and Steve Keirn). In 1986 he started working as a singles wrestler for Texas USA All-Star Wrestling, working storylines opposite Al Madril, Lord Jonathan Boyd and Big Bubba.

In 1987 Travis returned to Memphis, this time with Frank Morell as his mentor. During his stint in the CWA he teamed with another young wrestler, Jeff Jarrett forming a very popular team that won the AWA Southern Tag Team Championship three times. He would also win the International Championship from Austin Idol and worked an extended storyline against Phil Hickerson. Travis and a rookie Scott Steiner won the CWA Tag Team Championship twice. Travis would suffer from drug abuse around this time, which ruined his professional reputation, but he continued to work in several smaller promotions. He gained notoriety in June 1997 while working for the USWA, where he was arrested when his ex-wife was reportedly seeking overdue child support payments and had tipped off Memphis police that Travis would be on location for Saturday tapings at the WMC TV studios in Memphis. Police took this tip seriously and were actually on the scene when Travis arrived. This arrest was enough for Jerry Lawler, the booker, to turn this arrest into a storyline.

Travis retired from wrestling in 1999, but eventually returned in 2001. His last recorded match took place at a show for New Generation Wrestling on July 26, 2002, where he lost to Lawler.

== Personal life and death ==
Mize and his wife Kathryn had a daughter, Keaton, and two step-daughters, Sydney and Spencer.

On November 23, 2002, Mize suffered a heart attack shortly after arriving at his mother's home. He was taken to the Baptist Regional Medical Center, where he was pronounced dead at the age of 41.

== Championships and accomplishments ==
- Americas Wrestling Federation (Puerto Rico)
  - AWF World Junior Heavyweight Championship (3 times)
- Continental Wrestling Association
  - AWA Southern Tag Team Championship (4 times) – with Jeff Jarrett (3) and Mark Starr (1)
  - CWA Tag Team Championship (3 times) – with Scott Steiner (2) and Action Jackson (1)
- Memphis Wrestling Hall of Fame
  - Class of 2022
- Mountain Wrestling Association
  - MWA Tag Team Championship (3 times) – with Michael Ray
- Power Pro Wrestling
  - PPW Tag Team Championship (1 time) – with Bulldog Raines
- Pro Wrestling Illustrated
  - PWI ranked Billy Travis # 139 of the 500 best singles wrestlers of the PWI 500 in 1993
- United States Wrestling Association
  - USWA Southern Heavyweight Championship (1 time)
  - USWA World Tag Team Championship (2 times) – with Flash Flanagan (2)
- World Wrestling Council
  - WWC Junior Heavyweight Championship (1 time)
  - WWC Caribbean Tag Team Championship (1 time) - with El Gran Mendoza
- Texas All-Star Wrestling
  - Texas All-Star USA Heavyweight Championship (1 time)

== See also ==
- List of premature professional wrestling deaths
