= George Barnes (wrestler) =

Australian wrestler

Personal information
- Born: George Cloughessy Balmain, New South Wales, Australia

Professional wrestling career
- Ring name: George Barnes
- Billed height: 6 ft 0 in (183 cm)
- Billed weight: 242 lb (17 st 4 lb; 110 kg)
- Billed from: Balmain in Sydney, Australia
- Debut: 1969
- Retired: 1987

George Cloughessy is an Australian actor and professional wrestler he wrestled for All Japan Pro Wrestling and World Championship Wrestling and various other promotions in Australia, Hong Kong, Japan, South Africa, Mexico and North America.

== Professional wrestling career ==
He toured the United States with success several times in the 1970s and 1980s and teamed with fellow Aussies Bill Dundee and Johnny Gray, and when he returned to Australia he changed his gimmick to anti-Aussie and pro-American and claimed that he had become a Yank and hated everything Australian.

== Personal life ==
He was a lifelong fan of the Balmain Tigers, which became one of his wrestling gimmicks.

== Championships and accomplishments ==
- American Wrestling Association/Continental Wrestling Association
  - CWA/AWA International Heavyweight Championship (1 time)
  - AWA Southern Tag Team Championship (2 times) – with Bill Dundee
- World Championship Wrestling (Australia)
  - NWA Austra-Asian Tag Team Championship (1 time) – with Bobby Shane
  - World Brass Knuckles Championship (1 time)
  - Australian Heavyweight Championship (1 time)
  - Australian Light Heavyweight Championship (1 time)
