= Chick Donovan =

American professional wrestler

Personal information
- Born: Charles Donovan Kelley; March 7, 1947 (age 79) Lagrange, Georgia, U.S.

Professional wrestling career
- Ring name: Chick Donovan
- Billed from: Hollywood, California
- Debut: 1977

Charles Donovan Kelley (born March 7, 1947), better known by his ring name Chick Donovan, is an American semi-retired professional wrestler who worked for Georgia Championship Wrestling and a short time with World Championship Wrestling and World Wrestling Federation.

== Professional wrestling career ==
Making his professional debut in 1977, he carried on notable feuds with wrestling legends Jerry "The King" Lawler and Tommy Rich. He wrestled at the peak of his career in the American Wrestling Association and the NWA.

In 1981, while working for the Continental Wrestling Association in Memphis, he was recruited into The First Family by manager (& then-AWA Southern Heavyweight Champion) Jimmy Hart. Donovan would later win the Southern Heavyweight title from Hart in a farcical match when Hart laid down in the ring and allowed Donovan to pin him. Donovan would be stripped of the belt because of the way in which he won it not long after.

From 1987 to 1988 he wrestled in the World Wrestling Federation (WWF, now WWE) as a jobber losing to Ricky Steamboat and The Ultimate Warrior.

From 1992 until 1995 he wrestled for World Championship Wrestling as a jobber. On June 20, 1995 he faced against WCW US Champion Sting in a losing effort on WCW Pro.

In 1995 he returned to WWF jobbing by making a couple appearances on TV. He retired later that year.

In 2005, Donovan came out of retirement.

His last official match was on February 3, 2006 in Birmingham, AL against Adrian Street.

On August 11, 2007, Donovan made a return to in-ring action with Georgia Wrestling Promotions, appearing at a show in Waleska, Georgia, pinning Chris Lightning. He is currently wrestling for the Prime Time Pro Wrestling (PTPW) and IWN (Independent Wrestling Network), both based in the Columbus area. Donovan, also makes frequent appearances at the Allstar Wrestling Network (AWN) in Fort Valley, Georgia.

Tommy Rich & Scotty Blaze & Hawkins beat Chick Donovan & Billy Love & Valentine in Villa Rica Georgia in Nov. 2007.

Chick Donovan wrestled for Alabama Wrestling federation on April 24, 2010 in Lucedale, Ms.

Chick Donovan has made several appearances for Swainsboro, Georgia-based company, Galaxie Pro Xtreme Wrestling, holding the GPXW World Heavyweight Championship. He battled Scotty Bullwinkle in November, losing via countout, and December, going to a double countout at shows in 2010.

Throughout 2010 Donovan has also frequently appeared at Fort Valley's AWN where he has feuded with Jake Slater, Paul Warfield, Joey Kidman, Chris Nelms and other up and comers. In addition to the AWN Donovan made his debut in Championship Wrestling Overload, as well as appearing in many other promotions.

On July 7, 2018, Donovan lost to the Masked Professional in a hair vs mask match at a CCW event in Dothan, Alabama. After the match the Masked Professional cut off all of Donovan's long blonde hair.

At 73, Donovan won the DHCW Heavyweight Championship for Down Home Championship Wrestling in LaGrange, Georgia, where he defeated Oxford Haney.

On June 23, 2023, Donovan lost to Johnny Swinger at Impact Wrestling's Summer Sizzler.

== Championships and accomplishments ==
- All-Star Wrestling Network
  - AWN World Heavyweight Championship (1 time)
  - AWN Tag Team Championship (1 time) – with Paul Warfield
- Continental Wrestling Association
  - AWA International Heavyweight Championship (1 time)
  - AWA Southern Heavyweight Championship (1 time)
  - AWA Southern Tag Team Championship (1 time) – with Jack Hart
- Down Home Championship Wrestling
  - DHCW Heavyweight Championship (1 time)
- Galaxie Pro Xtreme Wrestling
  - GPXW World Heavyweight Championship (1 time)
- Independent International Wrestling Association
  - IIWA Tag Team Championship (1 time) – with Tim Horner
- Main Event Wrestling
  - MEW Georgia Heavyweight Championship (1 time)
- Southeastern Championship Wrestling
  - NWA United States Junior Heavyweight Championship (2 times)
