= Bill Dundee =

Australian professional wrestler and author (1943–2026)

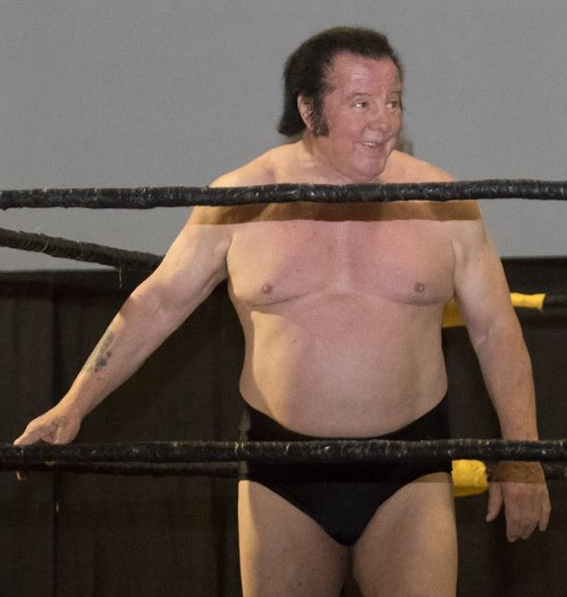
- Dundee in the 2018

Personal information
- Born: William Cruickshanks; 24 October 1943 Angus, Scotland
- Died: 6 September 2026 (aged 82) Jackson, Tennessee, U.S.
- Children: 2, including J. C. Ice

Professional wrestling career
- Ring name(s): Bill Dundee; William Dundee; Sir William Dundee; Squire William
- Billed height: 5 ft 7 in (170 cm)
- Billed weight: 214 lb (97 kg)
- Billed from: Australia
- Debut: 1962
- Retired: 14 December 2019

William Cruickshanks (24 October 1943 – 6 September 2026), also known by his ring name Bill Dundee, was a Scottish-born Australian professional wrestler. He was the father of Jamie Dundee and the father-in-law of wrestler Bobby Eaton.

== Early life and professional wrestling career ==
Dundee was born on 24 October 1943 in Angus, Scotland, and raised in Melbourne, Australia. At 16, he joined the circus as a trapeze artist. He started wrestling in Australia in 1962.

In 1974, Dundee began wrestling in the United States as "Superstar" Bill Dundee, teaming with George Barnes. He made a name for himself in the Memphis, Tennessee territory, where he regularly teamed and feuded with Jerry Lawler and Jimmy Valiant for years. Dundee and Lawler ventured to the American Wrestling Association in 1987 and captured the AWA World Tag Team Championship twice. As a singles wrestler, he held the Southern Heavyweight Championship belt several times from 1975 to 1985. Also, he had a successful team with "Nature Boy" Buddy Landel that wreaked havoc in Tennessee.

Dundee had a brief run in the National Wrestling Alliance's Jim Crockett Promotions, Central States Wrestling and Championship Wrestling from Florida in 1986, where he teamed with Jimmy Garvin and feuded with Sam Houston for the NWA Central States Heavyweight Championship. He also briefly managed The Barbarian and the MOD Squad while in those territories.

In 1993, Dundee signed with World Championship Wrestling as Sir William, the manager for Lord Steven Regal, he was fired in October 1994 due to a contract dispute.

He worked as a booker for Memphis, Louisiana and Georgia. He frequently appeared on Jackson, Tennessee, talk radio station WNWS 101.5 with Dan Reeves and on a talk show on Public-access television cable TV channels in West Tennessee. He promoted indy cards across Tennessee and in Southaven, Mississippi. He hosted a podcast on Anchor named If You Don't Want the Answer, Don't Ask the Question from 2018-2019.

On 20 July 2019, Dundee, at 75 years old, defeated Tony Deppen to win the unofficial WOMBAT Television Championship for Game Changer Wrestling in Tullahoma, Tennessee. He retired from wrestling in December 2019. Dundee continued to make a handful of personal appearances throughout the years. His final one came just one day before his death, on Memphis Wrestling, during a segment taped a few weeks prior honouring his life and 60-year career.

== Personal life and death ==
Dundee's son also became a wrestler under the name Jamie Dundee. His daughter Donna married wrestler "Beautiful" Bobby Eaton. Dundee could be seen in later years riding around Memphis in his custom-wrapped Mercury Grand Marquis.

In September 2023, Dundee's son Jamie revealed that his father was suffering from late-stage dementia. On 6 September 2026, Dundee died at the age of 82. His death came after a years-long battle with dementia, and a week-long hospital stay where he was treated for double pneumonia.

== Books ==
- If You Don't Want The Answer, Don't Ask The Question: Bill Dundee's Life Story

== Championships and accomplishments ==
- American Wrestling Federation
  - AWF Heavyweight Championship (1 time)
- Central States Wrestling
  - NWA Central States Heavyweight Championship (1 time)
- Memphis Wrestling Hall of Fame
  - Class of 2017
- Mid-South Wrestling Association
  - Mid-South Television Championship (1 time)
- NWA Mid-America / Continental Wrestling Association / Championship Wrestling Association
  - AWA Southern Heavyweight Championship (9 times)
  - AWA Southern Tag Team Championship (14 times) – with Norvell Austin (1), Robert Gibson (1), Jerry Lawler (4), Robert Fuller (1), Tommy Rich (2), Dream Machine (2), Steve Keirn (2) and Dutch Mantel (1)
  - AWA World Tag Team Championship (2 times) – with Jerry Lawler^{1}
  - CWA International Heavyweight Championship (4 times)
  - CWA International Tag Team Championship (1 time) – with Rocky Johnson
  - CWA Southwestern Heavyweight Championship (1 time)
  - CWA World Heavyweight Championship (1 time)
  - CWA World Tag Team Championship (1 time) – with Tommy Rich
  - NWA Mid-America Heavyweight Championship (1 time)
  - NWA Mid-America Tag Team Championship (1 time) – with Ricky Gibson
  - NWA Southern Heavyweight Championship (Memphis version) (1 time)
  - NWA Southern Tag Team Championship (Mid-America version) (3 times) – with Big Bad John (2) and Tommy Rich (1)
  - NWA United States Junior Heavyweight Championship (2 times)
- Ohio Valley Wrestling
  - OVW Heavyweight Championship (1 time)
- Power Pro Wrestling
  - PPW Tag Team Championship (1 time) – with Jerry Lawler
- Pro Wrestling Illustrated
  - Ranked No. 56 of the 100 top tag teams of the "PWI Years" with Jerry Lawler in 2003
- Pro Wrestling This Week
  - Wrestler of the Week (21–27 June 1987)
- Southeastern Championship Wrestling
  - NWA Southeastern Tag Team Championship (1 time) – with Tommy Rich
  - NWA United States Junior Heavyweight Championship (Southeastern version) (1 time)
- Supreme Wrestling
  - Supreme Mid-America Tag Team Championship (1 time) – with Rob Royale
- United States Wrestling Association
  - USWA Unified World Heavyweight Championship (1 time)
  - USWA Junior Heavyweight Championship (2 times)
  - USWA Southern Heavyweight Championship (3 times)
  - USWA Texas Heavyweight Championship (3 times)
  - USWA World Tag Team Championship (3 times) – with Jerry Lawler (2) and Jamie Dundee (1)
- WOMBAT Wrestling
  - WOMBAT Television Championship (1 time, final)
- World Class Wrestling Association
  - CWA Southwestern Heavyweight Championship (2 times)^{2}

^{1}Dundee's and Lawler's reigns with the AWA World Tag Team Championship began on cards hosted by the CWA through the interpromotional relationship between the AWA and CWA that also allowed the defense of the AWA Southern Heavyweight and Southern Tag Team Championships primarily within the CWA.
^{2}The CWA Southwestern Heavyweight Championship was promoted in both the CWA and WCWA while the promotions had a working relationship in 1989 and 1990.
