= CWA Southwestern Heavyweight Championship =

Details
- Promotion: United States Wrestling Association; World Class Wrestling Association
- Date established: September 1989
- Date retired: August 1990
Statistics
- First champion: The Dirty White Boy
- Most reigns: Bill Dundee and John Tatum (3)
- Longest reign: Bill Dundee (165 days)
- Shortest reign: John Tatum (7 days)
- Oldest champion: Bill Dundee (46 years, 241 days) (Note: Wrestlers' ages they won the championship: Dirty White Boy - 29 years, 173 days; Bill Dundee - first:46 years, 26 days, third: 46 years, 241 days; John Tatum - first: 30 years, 194 days, third: 30 years, 256 days)
- Youngest champion: Dirty White Boy (29 years, 173 days)
- Heaviest champion: John Tatum (233 lb (106 kg)) (Note: Wrestlers' weight when: Dirty White Boy - 211 lb (96 kg); Bill Dundee - 214 lb (97 kg); John Tatum - 233 lb (106 kg))
- Lightest champion: Dirty White Boy (211 lb (96 kg))

The CWA Southwestern Heavyweight Championship was a short-lived professional wrestling championship defended in the United States Wrestling Association (USWA, formerly the Championship Wrestling Association, hence the CWA name) and the World Class Wrestling Association (WCWA) during their joint promotion in 1989 and 1990. The title was abandoned when the two companies split.

The Dirty White Boy defeated Dustin Rhodes in the finals of a tournament to become the first CWA Southwestern Heavyweight Champion, records are unclear on who else competed in the tournament. Three wrestlers in total have shared seven total reigns, with Bill Dundee and John Tatum tied for most with three each. Dundee held the championship for a combined 205 days, longer than anyone else. His first reign, from November 19, 1989, to May 3, 1990, is the longest of any individual reign at 165 days.

The CWA Southwestern Heavyweight Championship is often mistakenly listed as being part of the USWA Southern Heavyweight Championship history. As it is a professional wrestling championship, it is won not by actual competition, but by a scripted ending to a match. (Note: Hornbaker (2016) p. 550: "Professional wrestling is a sport in which match finishes are predetermined. Thus, win–loss records are not indicative of a wrestler's genuine success based on their legitimate abilities – but on now much, or how little they were pushed by promoters")

== Title history ==
Key
No.	Overall reign number
Reign	Reign number for the specific champion
Days	Number of days held

No.	Champion	Championship change			Reign statistics		Notes	Ref.
No.	Champion	Date	Event	Location	Reign	Days	Notes	Ref.
1	The Dirty White Boy	October 2, 1989	House show	Memphis, Tennessee	1	48	Defeated Dustin Rhodes in a tournament final to become the first champion.	
2	Bill Dundee	November 19, 1989	House show	Memphis, Tennessee	1	165		
3	John Tatum	May 3, 1990	House show	Dallas, Texas	1	15		
4	Bill Dundee	May 18, 1990	House show	Dallas, Texas	2	28		
5	John Tatum	June 15, 1990	House show	Dallas, Texas	2	7		
6	Bill Dundee	June 22, 1990	House show	Dallas, Texas	3	12		
7	John Tatum	July 4, 1990	House show	Dallas, Texas	3	(Note: The exact date the championship was abandoned is uncertain, which means that this reign lasted between 28 and 58 days.)		
—	Deactivated	August 1990	—	—	—	—	Abandoned when World Class seceded from the USWA.	

== List of combined reigns ==
Key

Symbol	Meaning
¤	The exact length of at least one title reign is uncertain, so the shortest possible length is used.

Rank	Wrestler	# of reigns	Combined days
1	Bill Dundee	3	205
2	John Tatum	3	50¤
3	The Dirty White Boy	1	48

== See also ==
- Championship Wrestling Association
- United States Wrestling Association
- World Class Wrestling Association
