= Christine Jarrett =

American professional wrestling promoter (1923-1998)

Christine Jarrett (née Wright; 12 January 1923 – 19 November 1998), also known as "Teeny Jarrett", was an American professional wrestling promoter. She is known for her work with promoters Nick Gulas and Roy Welch in the Mid-Southern United States.

She began working in ticket sales, promoting local events in Tennessee and also worked at the Nashville Hippodrome for NWA Mid-America.

When her son Jerry Jarrett opened up his own promotion Continental Wrestling Association in 1977, she became his partner.

She was posthumously awarded by the Cauliflower Alley Club in 2022.

When the NWA Mid-America Heavyweight Championship was reactivated in 2024, the title belt was nicknamed "Christine," after her.

== Family ==
Jarrett was the mother of promoter Jerry Jarrett (1942–2023), and the grandmother of professional wrestler and promoter Jeff Jarrett.

== Awards and accomplishments ==
- Cauliflower Alley Club
  - Posthumous Award (2022)
- International Professional Wrestling Hall of Fame
  - Class of 2023 (Trailblazer Award)
- Memphis Wrestling Hall of Fame
  - Class of 1994
