= CWA Heavyweight Championship =

Professional wrestling championship

Details
- Promotion: Championship Wrestling Association
- Date established: December 7, 1987
- Date retired: October 1989
Statistics
- First champion: Jerry Lawler
- Final champion: Tony Anthony
- Most reigns: Dutch Mantel/Texas Dirt (3 reigns)
- Longest reign: Phil Hickerson (127 days)
- Shortest reign: Black Bart (7 days)

The CWA Heavyweight Championship was a major professional wrestling title defended in the Championship Wrestling Association. It was created through the unification of the NWA Mid-America Heavyweight, AWA Southern Heavyweight and CWA/AWA International Heavyweight championships.

The title was thus considered the most important title in the promotion until Jerry Lawler won the AWA World Heavyweight Championship on May 5, 1988. On December 13, 1988, Lawler defeated Kerry Von Erich to win the World Class Heavyweight Championship and effectively rename the latter title the USWA Unified World Heavyweight Championship and make it the new top championship in Memphis. The CWA title continued as the secondary title until late 1989 when it was replaced with the USWA Southern Heavyweight Championship.

== Title history ==
Key
No.	Overall reign number
Reign	Reign number for the specific champion
Days	Number of days held

No.	Champion	Championship change			Reign statistics		Notes	Ref.
No.	Champion	Date	Event	Location	Reign	Days	Notes	Ref.
1	Jerry Lawler	December 7, 1987	House show	Memphis, Tennessee	1	63	Lawler, the reigning AWA Southern Heavyweight Champion, defeated Jeff Jarrett to win the NWA Mid-America Heavyweight Championship and Manny Fernandez to win the CWA/AWA International Heavyweight Championship. The titles are all unified, creating the new title.	
2	Max Pain	February 8, 1988	House show	Memphis, Tennessee	1	105		
3	Brickhouse Brown	May 23, 1988	House show	Memphis, Tennessee	1	35	Won by forfeit.	
4	Max Pain	June 27, 1988	House show	Memphis, Tennessee	2	13		
5	Phil Hickerson	July 10, 1988	House show	Memphis, Tennessee	1	127		
—	Vacated	November 14, 1988	—	—	—	—	Vacated after a match with Brian Lee.	
6	Brian Lee	November 19, 1988	TV Studio show	Memphis, Tennessee	1	21	Defeated Mike Miller in a tournament final.	
7	Sid Vicious	December 10, 1988	House show	Memphis, Tennessee	1	30		
8	Wendell Cooley	January 9, 1989	House show	Memphis, Tennessee	1	(Note: The exact date were Cooley left CWA is uncertain which means that his championship reign lasted between 1 and 21 days.)		
9	Dutch Mantell	February 1989	N/A	N/A	1	(Note: The date that Mantel was awarded the championship is uncertain which means that the championship reign lasted between 39 and 60 days.)	Awarded the title after Cooley left the company.	
10	Jeff Jarrett	March 11, 1989	House show	Memphis, Tennessee	1	107		
11	Black Bart	June 26, 1989	House show	Memphis, Tennessee	1	70		
12	Texas Dirt	September 4, 1989	House show	Memphis, Tennessee	2	7		
13	Black Bart	September 11, 1989	House show	Memphis, Tennessee	2	7		
14	Texas Dirt	September 18, 1989	House show	Memphis, Tennessee	3	5		
—	Vacated	September 23, 1989	Championship Wrestling TV Show	—	—	—	Championship vacated by the promotion after Texas Dirt gave the championship to Dutch Mantell	
15	Tony Anthony	October 9, 1989	House show	Memphis, Tennessee	1	47	Defeated Dustin Rhodes in a one night tournament final.	
—	Deactivated	November 1989	—	—	—	—	On the December 16, 1989 episode of Championship Wrestling, Bill Dundee is named as both “CWA Champion” and “Southern Champion” interchangeably. Dundee in a promo mentioned he won the title in Texas. Retired in favor of the USWA Southern Heavyweight Championship.	

== See also ==
- Continental Wrestling Association
- United States Wrestling Association
