= Phil Hickerson =

American professional wrestler (1946–2026)

Personal information
- Born: October 4, 1946 Jackson, Tennessee, U.S.
- Died: May 20, 2026 (aged 79) Jackson, Tennessee, U.S.

Professional wrestling career
- Ring name(s): Mr. Nashville; Phil Hickerson; PY Chu-hi
- Billed height: 6 ft 1 in (185 cm)
- Billed weight: 308 lb (140 kg)
- Debut: 1974
- Retired: 1991

Phil Hickerson (October 4, 1946 – May 20, 2026) was an American professional wrestler. He is best known for his appearances with the Tennessee-based NWA Mid-America and Continental Wrestling Association promotions.

== Professional wrestling career ==
Hickerson debuted in 1974 in the Tennessee-based NWA Mid America promotion. In July 1974, he formed a tag team with Al Greene, with whom he won the NWA Southern Tag Team Championship (Mid-America version) three times that year, trading the titles with Jerry Lawler and Tojo Yamamoto. In December 1974, Hickerson formed a short-lived new tag team with Doug Patton.

In mid-1975, Hickerson formed a tag team with Dennis Condrey known as the "Bicentennial Kings" (in reference to the then-upcoming United States Bicentennial). In 1975, they teamed with Al Greene to win the NWA World Six-Man Tag Team Championship. Between 1976 and 1978, the Bicentennial Kings won the NWA Southern Tag Team Championship (Mid-America version) / AWA Southern Tag Team Championship nine times. They also won the NWA United States Tag Team Championship (Mid-America version) five times and the NWA Mid-America Tag Team Championship twice.

In 1977, Hickerson left NWA Mid America to join Jerry Jarrett's upstart Memphis, Tennessee-based Continental Wrestling Association.

He was inactive in the early 1980s due to injury; he returned to wrestling in 1984. In 1985, he won the AWA International Heavyweight Championship three times. In 1988, he won the CWA Heavyweight Championship.

In November and December 1988, Hickerson toured Japan with All-Japan Pro Wrestling, competing in the 1988 World's Strongest Tag Determination League alongside Jerry Blackwell.

In February 1989, Hickerson began wrestling for the United States Wrestling Association, where he portrayed a faux-Japanese character and was managed by Tojo Yamamoto. He adopted the ring name "PY Chu-hi" (a pun based on Yamamoto's former ring name, "PY Chung", and the alcoholic drink Chu-hi). In July 1989, he defeated Eric Embry for the WCWA Texas Heavyweight Championship; he lost the title back to Embry the following month.

In 1995, Hickerson was inducted into the Memphis Wrestling Hall of Fame.

== Retirement and death ==
In the latter part of his wrestling career, he managed Tremors Nightclub in Jackson, Tennessee, from 1981 to 1987. After retiring from wrestling, Hickerson worked as a radio DJ for WYN 106.9 in Jackson, Tennessee.

Hickerson died on May 20, 2026, at the age of 79.

== Championships and accomplishments ==
- Continental Wrestling Association / NWA Mid-America / United States Wrestling Association
  - AWA International Heavyweight Championship (3 times)
  - CWA Heavyweight Championship (1 time)
  - NWA Mid-America Tag Team Championship (2 times) – with Dennis Condrey
  - NWA Southern Tag Team Championship (Mid-America version) / AWA Southern Tag Team Championship (14 times) – with Al Greene (3 times), Dennis Condrey (9 times), and The Spoiler (2 times)
  - NWA United States Tag Team Championship (Mid-America version) (5 times) - with Dennis Condrey
  - NWA World Six-Man Tag Team Championship (2 times) - with Al Greene and Dennis Condrey
- Memphis Wrestling Hall of Fame
  - Class of 1995
- Southeastern Championship Wrestling
  - NWA Southeastern Tag Team Championship (3 times) – with Dennis Condrey
- World Class Wrestling Association
  - WCWA Texas Heavyweight Championship (1 time)
