= AWA International Heavyweight Championship =

Professional wrestling championship

CWA/AWA International Heavyweight Championship
- The championship belt

Details
- Promotion: Continental Wrestling Association, American Wrestling Association
- Date established: February 1983
- Date retired: December 7, 1987

Other name(s)
- CWA/AWA International Heavyweight Championship CWA International Heavyweight Championship AWA International US Heavyweight Championship Mid-Southern International Championship AWA International Championship
Statistics
- First champion(s): Austin Idol
- Final champion(s): Jerry Lawler
- Most reigns: Jerry Lawler, Bill Dundee (4 times)
- Longest reign: Austin Idol (203 days)
- Shortest reign: Jerry Lawler (1 hour)

The AWA International Heavyweight Championship, originally known as the CWA/AWA International Heavyweight Championship (also identified as the Mid-Southern International Championship and the AWA International Championship) was a major professional wrestling title defended in the Continental Wrestling Association. It was created in 1983 from the CWA's partnership with the American Wrestling Association. The title lasted until 1987, when it was unified with the NWA Mid-America Heavyweight and AWA Southern Heavyweight championships, creating the CWA Heavyweight Championship.

== Title history ==
Key
No.	Overall reign number
Reign	Reign number for the specific champion
Days	Number of days held

No.	Champion	Championship change			Reign statistics		Notes	Ref.
No.	Champion	Date	Event	Location	Reign	Days	Notes	Ref.
1	Austin Idol	February 1983		N/A	1	125	Idol was awarded the title as the first champion.	
2	Jerry Lawler	March 7, 1983	House show	Memphis, Tennessee	1	70		
3	Ken Patera	May 16, 1983	House show	Memphis, Tennessee	1	70		
4	Jerry Lawler	July 25, 1983	House show	Memphis, Tennessee	2	21		
5	Ken Patera	August 15, 1983	House show	Memphis, Tennessee	2	26		
6	Austin Idol	September 10, 1983	House show	Memphis, Tennessee	2	2		
7	Stan Hansen	September 12, 1983	House show	Memphis, Tennessee	1	21		
8	Austin Idol	October 3, 1983	House show	Memphis, Tennessee	3	203	This was a bullrope match.	
9	Randy Savage	April 23, 1984	House show	Memphis, Tennessee	1	21		
10	Austin Idol	May 14, 1984	House show	Memphis, Tennessee	4	33		
11	Masao Ito	June 16, 1984	House show	Memphis, Tennessee	1	23		
12	Tommy Rich	July 9, 1984	House show	Memphis, Tennessee	1	48		
13	Eddie Gilbert	August 26, 1984	House show	Memphis, Tennessee	1	22		
14	Dutch Mantel	September 17, 1984	House show	Memphis, Tennessee	1	7		
15	Eddie Gilbert	September 24, 1984	House show	Memphis, Tennessee	2	95		
16	Terry Taylor	December 28, 1984	House show	Memphis, Tennessee	1	191		
17	Phil Hickerson	July 7, 1985	House show	Memphis, Tennessee	1	8		
18	Terry Taylor	July 15, 1985	House show	Memphis, Tennessee	2	7		
19	Phil Hickerson	July 22, 1985	House show	Memphis, Tennessee	2	70		
20	Mongolian Stomper	September 30, 1985	House show	Memphis, Tennessee	1	21	Won the title by countout.	
21	Phil Hickerson	October 21, 1985	House show	Memphis, Tennessee	3	19		
22	Dutch Mantel	November 9, 1985	House show	Memphis, Tennessee	2	86		
23	Rick Casey	February 3, 1986	House show	Memphis, Tennessee	1	28		
24	Abdul Gaddafi	March 3, 1986	House show	Memphis, Tennessee	1	21		
25	Billy Travis	March 24, 1986	House show	Memphis, Tennessee	1	42		
26	Bill Dundee	May 5, 1986	House show	Memphis, Tennessee	1	70		
27	Jerry Lawler	July 14, 1986	House show	Memphis, Tennessee	3	56	This was a "loser leaves town" match.	
—	Vacated	September 8, 1986	House show	Memphis, Tennessee	—	—	Vacated for undocumented reasons	
28	Big Bubba	October 6, 1986	House show	Memphis, Tennessee	1	90		
29	Soul Train Jones	January 4, 1987	House show	Memphis, Tennessee	1	106		
30	Chick Donovan	April 20, 1987	House show	Memphis, Tennessee	1	54		
31	Bill Dundee	June 13, 1987	House show	Memphis, Tennessee	2	65		
32	George Barnes	August 17, 1987	House show	Memphis, Tennessee	1	14		
33	Bill Dundee	August 31, 1987	House show	Memphis, Tennessee	3	41		
—	Vacated	October 11, 1987	—	—	—	—	Dundee and Lawler wins AWA World Tag Team Titles	
34	Bill Dundee	October 27, 1987	House show	Nashville, Tennessee	4	6	Won a tournament to win the vacant title.	
35	Manny Fernandez	November 2, 1987	House show	Memphis, Tennessee	1	35		
36	Jerry Lawler	December 7, 1987	House show	Memphis, Tennessee	4	0		
—	Unified	December 7, 1987	House show	Memphis, Tennessee	—	—	Unified with the NWA Mid-America Heavyweight Championship and AWA Southern Heavyweight Championship to create the CWA Heavyweight Championship	

== See also ==
- AEW International Championship
- AWA Superstars of Wrestling International Heavyweight Championship
- CWA Heavyweight Championship
- NWA International Heavyweight Championship
- WCW International World Heavyweight Championship
- WWF International Heavyweight Championship
