= NWA Mid-America Heavyweight Championship =

Professional wrestling championship

- The original championship belt

Details
- Promotion: National Wrestling Alliance
- Date established: 1957
- Current champion: Jeremiah Plunkett
- Date won: June 1, 2024 (aired September 3, 2024)
Statistics
- First champion: "Nature Boy" Buddy Rogers
- Most reigns: Dutch Mantell (13 reigns)
- Longest reign: Jeremiah Plunkett (719+ days)
- Shortest reign: Dutch Mantel (53 minutes)
- Oldest champion: Tojo Yamamoto (At least 52 years)
- Youngest champion: Tommy Rich (20 years old)
- Heaviest champion: Big Bubba (385 lb (175 kg))

The NWA Mid-America Heavyweight Championship is a professional wrestling title that was originally defended in the United States of Tennessee and Alabama. The current champion is Jeremiah Plunkett.

== History ==
In 1957 "Nature Boy" Buddy Rogers became the inaugural champion. The title began in 1957 and lasted first until 1980 when it was first abandoned when Jerry Jarrett took over the Mid-American titles from Nick Gulas. Jarrett revived it in 1981, making it a part of the Memphis-based Continental Wrestling Association, and it then lasted until 1987 when it was unified with the newly created CWA (now renamed Championship Wrestling Association) Heavyweight Championship.

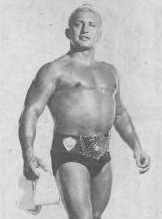
Inaugural champion Buddy Rogers.

The title was originally defended in the United States in Tennessee and Alabama.

On May 10, 2024, NWA President Billy Corgan announced that the NWA would reactivate the Mid-America Heavyweight Championship, with a new champion being crowned at their Back to the Territories event on June 1, 2024, in Knoxville, Tennessee; Jeremiah Plunkett defeated Dante Casanova, Hunter Drake, and Mario Parua in a four-way elimination match to win the revived title. The championship belt is also nicknamed "Christine," after Christine Jarrett.

== Reigns ==
=== Names ===
Name	Years
NWA Mid-America Heavyweight Championship	1957–present

Key
No.	Overall reign number
Reign	Reign number for the specific champion
Days	Number of days held

No.	Champion	Championship change			Reign statistics		Notes	Ref.
No.	Champion	Date	Event	Location	Reign	Days	Notes	Ref.
National Wrestling Alliance (NWA)
1	Buddy Rogers	May 1957 (NLT)		(Note: The location of the match was not found documented.)	1	(Note: The length of this championship reign is too uncertain to calculate.)	House show	
Championship history is unrecorded from May 1957 to April 1958.
2	Mighty Atlas	April 1958 (NLT)	House show		1	(Note: The date for the start or the end of the reign is uncertain, which means that this championship reign lasted between 1 and 357 days.)		
3	Tor Yamata	April 24, 1958	House show	Chattanooga, Tennessee	1			
Championship history is unrecorded from April 24, 1958 to July 1971.
4	Len Rossi	July 1971 (NLT)	House show		1			
Championship history is unrecorded from July 1971 to June 1972.
5	Tony Charles	June 1972 (NLT)	House show		1			
Championship history is unrecorded from June 1972 to October 1974.
6	Don Kent	October 1974 (NLT)	House show		1	(Note: The date for the start or the end of the reign is uncertain, which means that this championship reign lasted at least 65 days.)		
7	Jackie Fargo	January 4, 1975	House show	Chattanooga, Tennessee	1	(Note: The date for the start or the end of the reign is uncertain, which means that this championship reign lasted between 1 and 26 days.)		
8	Don Kent	January 1975	House show		2	(Note: The date for the start or the end of the reign is uncertain, which means that this championship reign lasted between 1 and 26 days.)		
9	Luke Graham	February 5, 1975	House show	Nashville, Tennessee	1	(Note: The date for the start or the end of the reign is uncertain, which means that this championship reign lasted between 0 and 84 days.)		
10	Don Kent	April 1975	House show	Louisville, Kentucky	3	(Note: The date for the start or the end of the reign is uncertain, which means that this championship reign lasted between 7 and 36 days.)		
11	Luke Graham	May 7, 1975	House show	Nashville, Tennessee	2	(Note: The date for the start or the end of the reign is uncertain, which means that this championship reign lasted between 1 and 146 days.)		
Championship history is unrecorded from May 7, 1975 to 1975.
12	Harley Race	1975	House show		1	(Note: The date for the start or the end of the reign is uncertain, which means that this championship reign lasted between 1 and 145 days.)		
13	Magnificent Zulu	September 1975 (NLT)	House show		1	(Note: The date for the start or the end of the reign is uncertain, which means that this championship reign lasted between 1 and 124 days.)		
14	Harley Race	September 9, 1975	House show	Memphis, Tennessee	2	(Note: The date for the start or the end of the reign is uncertain, which means that this championship reign lasted between 1 and 113 days.)		
Championship history is unrecorded from September 9, 1975 to December 1975.
15	Jackie Fargo	December 1975 (NLT)	House show		2	(Note: The date for the start or the end of the reign is uncertain, which means that this championship reign lasted between 61 and 202 days.)		
Championship history is unrecorded from December 1975 to March 1976.
16	Dick Steinborn	March 1976 (NLT)	House show		1	(Note: The date for the start or the end of the reign is uncertain, which means that this championship reign lasted between 62 and 212 days.)		
Championship history is unrecorded from March 1976 to June 1976.
17	Bill Dundee	June 1976 (NLT)	House show	Seymour, Indiana	1	(Note: The date for the start or the end of the reign is uncertain, which means that this championship reign lasted between 45 and 165 days.)		
18	Bob Armstrong	August 14, 1976	House show	Chattanooga, Tennessee	1	(Note: The date for the start or the end of the reign is uncertain, which means that this championship reign lasted between 18 and 41 days.)		
19	Big Bad John	September 1976	House show		1	(Note: The date for the start or the end of the reign is uncertain, which means that this championship reign lasted between 1 and 25 days.)		
20	Bob Armstrong	September 25, 1976	House show	Chattanooga, Tennessee	2	(Note: The date for the start or the end of the reign is uncertain, which means that this championship reign lasted between 6 and 36 days.)		
21	Bill Dundee	October 1976	House show		2	(Note: The date for the start or the end of the reign is uncertain, which means that this championship reign lasted between 1 and 31 days.)		
22	Tommy Rich	November 1976 (NLT)	House show		1	(Note: The date for the start or the end of the reign is uncertain, which means that this championship reign lasted between 32 and 122 days.)		
23	Russian Stomper	January 1977	House show	Madison, Indiana	1	(Note: The date for the start or the end of the reign is uncertain, which means that this championship reign lasted between 13 and 43 days.)		
24	Ken Lucas	February 13, 1977	House show	Chattanooga, Tennessee	1	61		
25	The Executioner	April 15, 1977	House show	Huntsville, Alabama	1	43		
26	Jackie Fargo	May 28, 1977	House show	Chattanooga, Tennessee	3	(Note: The date for the start or the end of the reign is uncertain, which means that this championship reign lasted between 1 and 196 days.)		
—	Vacated	1977	—	—	—	—	Jackie Fargo was injured	
27	Lanny Poffo	October 9, 1977	House show	Chattanooga, Tennessee	1	62	Defeated Dennis Hall in a tournament final to win the vacant title.	
28	Don Kent	December 10, 1977	House show	Chattanooga, Tennessee	4	24		
29	Randy Savage	January 3, 1978	House show	Birmingham, Alabama	1	82		
30	Dutch Mantel	March 26, 1978	House show	Chattanooga, Tennessee	1	56		
31	Don Garfield	May 21, 1978	House show	Chattanooga, Tennessee	1	7	Vacated after a match against Dutch Mantel	
32	Dutch Mantel	May 28, 1978	House show	Chattanooga, Tennessee	2	45		
33	Whipper Watson Jr.	July 12, 1978	House show	Nashville, Tennessee	1	10		
34	Dutch Mantel	July 22, 1978	House show	Chattanooga, Tennessee	3	21		
35	Blue Yankee	August 12, 1978	House show	Chattanooga, Tennessee	1	(Note: The date for the start or the end of the reign is uncertain, which means that this championship reign lasted between 20 and 38 days.)		
—	Vacated	September 1978	—	—	—	—	Vacated after a match against Dutch Mantel	
36	Mexican Angel	September 20, 1978	House show	Nashville, Tennessee	1	52	Won a 13-man tournament to win the vacant title.	
37	Dutch Mantel	November 11, 1978	House show	Nashville, Tennessee	4	0		
38	Randy Savage	November 11, 1978	House show	Nashville, Tennessee	2	(Note: The date for the start or the end of the reign is uncertain, which means that this championship reign lasted between 1 and 109 days.)		
39	Bobby Eaton	February 1979 (NLT)	House show		1	(Note: The date for the start or the end of the reign is uncertain, which means that this championship reign lasted between 60 and 87 days.)		
40	Chris Colt	April 29, 1979	House show	Nashville, Tennessee	1	24		
41	Ron Garfield	May 23, 1979	House show	Nashville, Tennessee	1	10		
42	Dennis Condrey	June 2, 1979	House show	Chattanooga, Tennessee	1	140	Defeated Gorgeous George Jr.	
43	Dutch Mantel	October 20, 1979	House show	Chattanooga, Tennessee	5	4		
44	Bobby Eaton	October 24, 1979	House show	Nashville, Tennessee	2	32		
45	Chris Colt	November 25, 1979	House show	Nashville, Tennessee	2	(Note: The date for the start or the end of the reign is uncertain, which means that this championship reign lasted between 6 and 36 days.)		
46	Bobby Eaton	December 1979	House show	Miami, Florida	3	(Note: The date for the start or the end of the reign is uncertain, which means that this championship reign lasted between 48 and 78 days.)		
47	Gorgeous George Jr.	February 17, 1980	House show	Chattanooga, Tennessee	1	(Note: The date for the start or the end of the reign is uncertain, which means that this championship reign lasted between 1 and 16 days.)		
48	Bobby Eaton	February 1980	House show	Madison, Indiana	4	(Note: The date for the start or the end of the reign is uncertain, which means that this championship reign lasted between 1 and 11 days.)		
49	Tojo Yamamoto	February 1980	House show	Versailles, Indiana	1	(Note: The date for the start or the end of the reign is uncertain, which means that this championship reign lasted between 33 and 46 days.)		
50	Steve Travis	April 1980 (NLT)	House show	Lexington, Kentucky	1	(Note: The date for the start or the end of the reign is uncertain, which means that this championship reign lasted between 1 and 46 days.)		
51	Roger Mason	April 5, 1980	House show	Chattanooga, Tennessee	1	35		
52	Rocky Johnson	May 10, 1980	House show	Chattanooga, Tennessee	1	(Note: The date for the start or the end of the reign is uncertain, which means that this championship reign lasted between 1 and 21 days.)		
53	The Great Togo	May 1980	House show	Louisville, Kentucky	1	(Note: The date for the start or the end of the reign is uncertain, which means that this championship reign lasted between 25 and 45 days.)		
54	Robert Gibson	June 25, 1980	House show	Nashville, Tennessee	1	28		
55	Bobby Eaton	July 23, 1980	House show	Nashville, Tennessee	5	(Note: The date for the start or the end of the reign is uncertain, which means that this championship reign lasted between 70 and 100 days.)		
—	Vacated	October 1980	—	—	—	—	NWA Mid-America ceases to operate, Jerry Jarrett gains control of the championship	
Revived the title in Continental Wrestling Association
56	Ron Bass	July 1981	House show	Seymour, Indiana	1	(Note: The date for the start or the end of the reign is uncertain, which means that this championship reign lasted between 1 and 6 days.)	Awarded the championship.	
57	Steve Keirn	July 6, 1981	House show	Memphis, Tennessee	1	49		
58	Bugsy McGraw	August 24, 1981	House show	Memphis, Tennessee	1	14		
59	Steve Keirn	September 7, 1981	House show	Memphis, Tennessee	2	14		
60	Dutch Mantel	September 21, 1981	House show	Memphis, Tennessee	6	35		
—	Vacated	October 26, 1981	—	—	—	—	Vacated and inactive after Mantel won the AWA Southern Heavyweight Championship	
61	The Dream Machine	April 19, 1982	House show	Memphis, Tennessee	1	28		
62	Dutch Mantel	May 17, 1982	House show	Memphis, Tennessee	7	7		
63	Bobby Eaton	May 24, 1982	House show	Memphis, Tennessee	6	7		
64	King Cobra	May 31, 1982	House show	Memphis, Tennessee	1	35		
65	Dutch Mantel	July 5, 1982	House show	Memphis, Tennessee	8	7		
66	Bobby Eaton	July 12, 1982	House show	Memphis, Tennessee	7	(Note: The date for the start or the end of the reign is uncertain, which means that this championship reign lasted between 1 and 18 days.)		
67	Bill Dundee	July 24, 1982	House show	Memphis, Tennessee	3	(Note: The date for the start or the end of the reign is uncertain, which means that this championship reign lasted between 37 and 55 days.)	Dundee won the title on Memphis TV	
68	Dutch Mantel	September 6, 1982	House show	Memphis, Tennessee	9	70		
69	Jesse Barr	November 15, 1982	House show	Memphis, Tennessee	1	7		
70	Dutch Mantel	November 22, 1982	House show	Memphis, Tennessee	10	7		
71	Apocalypse	November 29, 1982	House show	Memphis, Tennessee	1	6		
72	Jacques Rougeau	December 5, 1982	House show	Memphis, Tennessee	1	22		
73	Sabu the Wildman	December 27, 1982	House show	Memphis, Tennessee	1	6		
74	Jacques Rougeau	January 2, 1983	House show	Memphis, Tennessee	2	8		
75	Bobby Eaton	January 10, 1983	House show	Memphis, Tennessee	8	(Note: The date for the start or the end of the reign is uncertain, which means that this championship reign lasted between 1 and 21 days.)		
—	Vacated	January 1983	—	—	—	—	Vacated for undocumented reasons	
76	Bobby Eaton	February 14, 1983	House show	Memphis, Tennessee	9	7	Defeated Sweet Brown Sugar in a tournament final to win the vacant title.	
77	Sweet Brown Sugar	February 21, 1983	House show	Tupelo, Mississippi	1	7		
78	Bobby Eaton	February 28, 1983	House show	Memphis, Tennessee	10	7	This was a loser leaves town match. Sweet Brown Sugar would reappear as the masked Stagger Lee.	
79	Stagger Lee	March 7, 1983	House show	Memphis, Tennessee	2	119		
80	Frankie Laine	July 4, 1983	House show	Memphis, Tennessee	1	14		
81	Dutch Mantel	July 18, 1983	House show	Memphis, Tennessee	11	28		
82	Buddy Landel	August 15, 1983	House show	Memphis, Tennessee	1	7		
83	Stagger Lee / Koko Ware	August 22, 1983	House show	Memphis, Tennessee	3	19	Ware removed his mask before the match with Landel.	
84	Buddy Landel	September 10, 1983	House show	Memphis, Tennessee	2	82		
85	Terry Taylor	December 1, 1983	House show	Lexington, Kentucky	1	25		
86	Randy Savage	December 26, 1983	House show	Memphis, Tennessee	3	105		
87	Jerry Lawler	April 9, 1984	House show	Lexington, Kentucky	1	224	The title may have been vacated since Lawler also held the AWA Southern Heavyweight Championship when he won the Mid-America title.	
88	Korstia Korchenko	November 19, 1984	House show	Memphis, Tennessee	1	(Note: The date for the start or the end of the reign is uncertain, which means that this championship reign lasted between 1 and 28 days.)	Defeated Jacques Rougeau to win the championship	
89	Mike Sharpe	December 17, 1984 (NLT)	House show		1	(Note: The date for the start or the end of the reign is uncertain, which means that this championship reign lasted between 56 and 83 days.)		
90	Jimmy Valiant	February 11, 1985	House show	Memphis, Tennessee	1	(Note: The date for the start or the end of the reign is uncertain, which means that this championship reign lasted between 140 and 154 days.)		
91	Man Mountain Link	July 1985	House show		1	(Note: The date for the start or the end of the reign is uncertain, which means that this championship reign lasted between 1 and 15 days.)	Awarded the championship.	
92	Jerry Lawler	July 15, 1985	House show	Memphis, Tennessee	2	14		
—	Vacated	July 29, 1985	—	—	—	—	Vacated when Lawler won the AWA Southern Heavyweight Championship	
93	Koko Ware	August 12, 1985	House show	Memphis, Tennessee	4	(Note: The date for the start or the end of the reign is uncertain, which means that this championship reign lasted between 1 and 18 days.)	Defeated Bota the Witch Doctor in a tournament final to win the vacant title.	
94	Bota the Witch Doctor	August 1985	House show	Richmond, Indiana	1	(Note: The date for the start or the end of the reign is uncertain, which means that this championship reign lasted between 1 and 49 days.)		
95	Koko Ware	September 1985	House show	North Vernon, Indiana	5	(Note: The date for the start or the end of the reign is uncertain, which means that this championship reign lasted between 7 and 36 days.)		
96	Harley Race	October 7, 1985	House show	Memphis, Tennessee	3	(Note: The date for the start or the end of the reign is uncertain, which means that this championship reign lasted between 25 and 54 days.)		
97	Tom Branch	November 1985	House show	Kansas City, Missouri	1	(Note: The date for the start or the end of the reign is uncertain, which means that this championship reign lasted between 1 and 16 days.)		
98	Koko Ware	November 16, 1985	House show	Memphis, Tennessee	6	66		
99	Buddy Landel	January 21, 1986	House show	Louisville, Kentucky	3	12		
100	Dirty Rhodes (Roger Smith)	February 2, 1986	House show	Memphis, Tennessee	2	16		
101	Buddy Landel	February 18, 1986	House show	Memphis, Tennessee	4	48		
102	Dutch Mantel	April 7, 1986	House show	Memphis, Tennessee	12	42		
103	Rip Rogers	May 19, 1986	House show	Memphis, Tennessee	1	28		
104	Dutch Mantel	June 16, 1986	House show	Memphis, Tennessee	13	(Note: The date for the start or the end of the reign is uncertain, which means that this championship reign lasted between 15 and 45 days.)		
—	Vacated	July 1986	—	—	—	—	Mantel left the CWA	
105	Tracy Smothers	August 11, 1986	House show	Memphis, Tennessee	1	57		
106	Boy Tony (Tony Falk)	October 7, 1986	House show	Memphis, Tennessee	1	13		
107	Tracy Smothers	October 20, 1986	House show	Memphis, Tennessee	2	7		
108	Big Bubba	October 27, 1986	House show	Memphis, Tennessee	1	(Note: The date for the start or the end of the reign is uncertain, which means that this championship reign lasted between 5 and 34 days.)	Also held CWA/AWA International Heavyweight Championship.	
—	Vacated	November 1988	—	—	—	—	Championship vacated for undocumented reasons	
109	The Great Kabuki	November 1986	House show	Jackson, Tennessee	1	(Note: The date for the start or the end of the reign is uncertain, which means that this championship reign lasted between 1 and 60 days.)	Defeated Paul Diamond in a tournament final.	
—	Vacated	1986	—	—	—	—	The Great Kabuki left the CWA	
110	Moondog Spot	May 1987			1	(Note: The date for the start or the end of the reign is uncertain, which means that this championship reign lasted between 1 and 11 days.)	Billed as champion on arrival.	
111	Jeff Jarrett	May 11, 1987	House show	Memphis, Tennessee	1	14		
112	Moondog Spot	May 25, 1987	House show	Memphis, Tennessee	2	7	Won the title by disqualification.	
113	Jeff Jarrett	June 1, 1987	House show	Memphis, Tennessee	2	7		
114	Moondog Spot	June 8, 1987	House show	Memphis, Tennessee	3	14		
115	Jeff Jarrett	June 22, 1987	House show	Memphis, Tennessee	3	77		
116	Carl Fergie	September 7, 1987	House show	Memphis, Tennessee	1	7		
117	Jeff Jarrett	September 14, 1987	House show	Memphis, Tennessee	4	49		
118	Jimmy Jack Funk	November 2, 1987	House show	Memphis, Tennessee	2	7	Previous held the championship under the name Jesse Barr	
119	Jeff Jarrett	November 9, 1987	House show	Memphis, Tennessee	5	28		
120	Jerry Lawler	December 7, 1987	House show	Memphis, Tennessee	3	343		
—	Deactivated	November 14, 1988	—	—	—	—	Championship merged with the AWA International Heavyweight Championship and the AWA Southern Heavyweight Championship to form the CWA Heavyweight Championship.	
Revived the title in the National Wrestling Alliance/Lightning One Inc.
121	Jeremiah Plunkett	June 1, 2024	NWA Back to the Territories	Knoxville, Tennessee	1	719+	This was a four-way elimination match also involving Dante Casanova, Hunter Drake, and Mario Parua. Aired on tape delay as a special episode of Powerrr on September 3, 2024.	

== See also ==
- National Wrestling Alliance
- Continental Wrestling Association
