= AWA Southern Heavyweight Championship =

Professional wrestling championship

Details
- Promotion: NWA Mid-America (1974–1977); Continental Wrestling Association (1977–1987); United States Wrestling Association (1990–1997); Memphis Championship Wrestling (2000–2001); Memphis Wrestling (2004–2010)
- Date established: July 27, 1974
- Date retired: 2010

Other names
- NWA Southern Heavyweight Championship (Mid-America version); NWA Southern Heavyweight Championship (Memphis version); Mid-Southern Heavyweight Championship; AWA Southern Heavyweight Championship; USWA Southern Heavyweight Championship; USWA Heavyweight Championship; MCW Southern Heavyweight Championship; Memphis Wrestling Southern Heavyweight Championship
Statistics
- First champion: Jerry Lawler
- Final champion: Brian Christopher
- Most reigns: Jerry Lawler (58 reigns (Note: Lawler held the NWA/AWA version 52 times, the USWA version 2 times, the MCW version 2 times and the MW version 2 times.))
- Shortest reign: Jerry Lawler (1 hour)

The AWA Southern Heavyweight Championship was a major professional wrestling title in the Continental Wrestling Association during the 1970s and 1980s. The title is part of a long lineage that was started when the NWA Southern Junior Heavyweight Championship, in use since 1939, was renamed the NWA Southern Heavyweight Championship (Memphis version) in 1974. The title's name changed again in 1978, when it was renamed the AWA Southern Heavyweight Championship due to a partnership with the American Wrestling Association. It was also called the Mid-Southern Heavyweight Championship in Pro Wrestling Illustrated and its sister publications, in order for this title to not be confused with Championship Wrestling from Florida's version of the title.

The title was revived in the United States Wrestling Association from 1989 until 1997 when the USWA closed. It was known as the USWA Southern Heavyweight Championship and later simply the USWA Heavyweight Championship during that time; however, unlike the previous Southern title in Memphis, this one played a secondary role to the USWA Unified World Heavyweight Championship. It was revived in Memphis Championship Wrestling as the MCW Southern Heavyweight Championship in 2000 and 2001. It was later revived and renamed in 2004 for use in Memphis Wrestling as the Memphis Wrestling Southern Heavyweight Championship, where the last recorded champion was Brian Christopher, winning the championship on November 4, 2010, but with no recorded championship matches since then. Memphis Wrestling held their last regular event in 2009.

== Title history ==
Key
No.	Overall reign number
Reign	Reign number for the specific champion
Days	Number of days held

No.	Champion	Championship change			Reign statistics		Notes	Ref.
No.	Champion	Date	Event	Location	Reign	Days	Notes	Ref.
NWA Southern Heavyweight Championship
1	Jerry Lawler	July 27, 1974	Mid-Am Show	Chattanooga, Tennessee	1	88	Defeated Jackie Fargo for the NWA Southern Junior Heavyweight Championship. The title was then renamed the NWA Southern Heavyweight Championship (Mid-America version) in August 1974.	
2	Robert Fuller	October 23, 1974	Mid-Am Show	Nashville, Tennessee	1	7		
3	Jerry Lawler	October 30, 1974	Mid-Am Show	Nashville, Tennessee	2	61		
—	Vacated	December 1974	—	—	—	—	Championship vacated for undocumented reasons	
4	Ron Fuller	December 29, 1974	Mid-Am Show	Memphis, Tennessee	1	162	Won an eight-man tournament.	
5	The Mongolian Stomper	June 9, 1975	Mid-Am Show	Memphis, Tennessee	1	35		
6	Jerry Lawler	July 14, 1975	Mid-Am Show	Memphis, Tennessee	3	(Note: The exact date the championship change took place is uncertain, which means the reign lasted between 1 and 14 days.)		
7	The Mongolian Stomper	July 28, 1975 (NLT)	Mid-Am Show	(Note: The location of the match was not captured as part of the documentation.)	2	(Note: The exact date the championship change took place is uncertain, which means the reign lasted between 12 and 25 days.)		
—	Vacated	August 9, 1975	Mid-Am Show	Memphis, Tennessee	—	—	Championship vacated after a match against Bob Armstrong.	
8	Bob Armstrong	September 29, 1975 (NLT)	Mid-Am Show		1	(Note: The exact date the championship change took place is uncertain, which means the reign lasted between 1 and 72 days.)	Defeated The Mongolian Stomper in a rematch. The title change may have been repeated on October 7, 1975 in Louisville, Kentucky.	
9	Jerry Lawler	October 20, 1975 (NLT)	Mid-Am Show	Huntsville, Alabama	4	(Note: The exact date the championship change took place is uncertain, which means the reign lasted between 1 and 55 days.)		
10	Bob Armstrong	November 24, 1975 (NLT)	Mid-Am Show		2	(Note: The exact date the championship change took place is uncertain, which means the reign lasted between 1 and 71 days.)		
	Vacated	November 1975		N/A			Championship vacated for undocumented reasons	
11	Jerry Lawler	December 15, 1975	Mid-Am Show	Memphis, Tennessee	5	(Note: The exact date the championship change took place is uncertain, which means the reign lasted between 17 and 35 days.)	Defeated Ron Fuller in a tournament final.	
—	Vacated	January 1976	—	—	—	—	Championship vacated after a match against Ricky Gibson	
12	Jerry Lawler	January 19, 1976	Mid-Am Show	Memphis, Tennessee	6	34	Defeated Ricky Gibson in a rematch.	
13	Tommy Rich	February 22, 1976	Mid-Am Show	Memphis, Tennessee	1	(Note: The exact date the championship change took place is uncertain, which means the reign lasted between 1 and 43 days.)		
14	Jerry Lawler	April 5, 1976 (NLT)	Mid-Am Show		7	(Note: The exact date the championship change took place is uncertain, which means the reign lasted between 126 and 168 days.)		
15	Jack Brisco	August 9, 1976	Mid-Am Show	Memphis, Tennessee	1	10		
16	Jerry Lawler	August 19, 1976	Mid-Am Show	Memphis, Tennessee	8	26		
17	Tommy Rich	September 14, 1976	Mid-Am Show	Memphis, Tennessee	2	(Note: The exact date the championship change took place is uncertain, which means the reign lasted between 1 and 20 days.)		
18	Jerry Lawler	October 4, 1976 (NLT)	Mid-Am Show		9	(Note: The exact date the championship change took place is uncertain, which means the reign lasted between 1 and 19 days.)		
19	Jackie Fargo	October 4, 1976	Mid-Am Show	Memphis, Tennessee	1	(Note: The exact date the championship change took place is uncertain, which means the reign lasted between 1 and 27 days.)		
20	Jerry Lawler	October 1976	Mid-Am Show		10	(Note: The exact date the championship change took place is uncertain, which means the reign lasted between 1 and 27 days.)		
21	Rocky Johnson	November 1, 1976	Mid-Am Show	Memphis, Tennessee	1	161	The championship moved from NWA Mid-America to the Continental Wrestling Association on March 20, 1977	
NWA Southern Heavyweight Championship / Mid-Southern Heavyweight Championship
22	Jerry Lawler	April 11, 1977	CWA Show	Memphis, Tennessee	11	17		
23	Bob Armstrong	April 28, 1977	CWA Show	Knoxville, Tennessee	3	3		
24	Jerry Lawler	May 1, 1977	CWA Show	Memphis, Tennessee	12	28		
25	Paul Orndorff	May 29, 1977	CWA Show	Memphis, Tennessee	1	50		
26	Jerry Lawler	July 18, 1977	CWA Show	Memphis, Tennessee	13	7		
27	Bill Dundee	July 25, 1977	CWA Show	Memphis, Tennessee	1	7		
28	Jerry Lawler	August 1, 1977	CWA Show	Memphis, Tennessee	14	21		
29	Bill Dundee	August 22, 1977	CWA Show	Memphis, Tennessee	2	7		
30	Jerry Lawler	August 29, 1977	CWA Show	Memphis, Tennessee	15	15		
—	Vacated	September 13, 1977	—	—	—	—	Lawler retired after a match against Bill Dundee, but later returned to the ring	
31	Jimmy Valiant	September 25, 1977	CWA Show	Louisville, Kentucky	1	15	Defeated Mr. Wrestling in the finals of a six-man one-night tournament.	
32	Jerry Lawler	October 10, 1977	CWA Show	Memphis, Tennessee	16	49		
33	Jimmy Valiant	November 28, 1977	CWA Show	Memphis, Tennessee	2	7		
34	Jerry Lawler	December 5, 1977	CWA Show	Memphis, Tennessee	17	245	Championship became an AWA championship in July 1978 when the CWA began working with the American Wrestling Association.	
35	Jos LeDuc	August 7, 1978	CWA Show	Memphis, Tennessee	1	7		
36	Jerry Lawler	August 14, 1978	CWA Show	Memphis, Tennessee	18	14		
37	Jos LeDuc	August 28, 1978	CWA Show	Memphis, Tennessee	2	7		
38	Jerry Lawler	September 4, 1978	CWA Show	Memphis, Tennessee	19	(Note: The exact date the championship change took place is uncertain, which means the reign lasted between 1 and 63 days.)		
39	Don Fargo	November 6, 1978 (NLT)	CWA Show		1	(Note: The exact date the championship change took place is uncertain, which means the reign lasted between 14 and 77 days.)		
40	Tommy Gilbert	November 20, 1978	CWA Show	Memphis, Tennessee	1	7		
41	Don Fargo	November 27, 1978	CWA Show	Memphis, Tennessee	2	7		
42	Jerry Lawler	December 4, 1978	CWA Show	Memphis, Tennessee	20	21		
43	Austin Idol	December 25, 1978	CWA Show	Memphis, Tennessee	1	21		
44	Ron Fuller	January 15, 1979	CWA Show	Memphis, Tennessee	2	28		
45	Toru Tanaka	February 12, 1979	CWA Show	Memphis, Tennessee	1	47	Won the title by forfeit. Robert Fuller won the title on March 19, 1979, but the title was returned to Tanaka.	
46	Buzz Sawyer	March 31, 1979	CWA Show	Memphis, Tennessee	1	2		
—	Vacated	April 2, 1979	—	—	—	—	Championship vacated after a match against the Mongolian Stomper	
47	The Mongolian Stomper	April 23, 1979	CWA Show	Memphis, Tennessee	3	42	Defeated Buzz Sawyer in a rematch.	
48	Robert Fuller	June 4, 1979	CWA Show	Memphis, Tennessee	2	(Note: The exact date the championship change took place is uncertain, which means the reign lasted between 1 and 25 days.)		
49	Ron Bass	June 1979	CWA Show	Bluefield, West Virginia	1	(Note: The exact date the championship change took place is uncertain, which means the reign lasted between 1 and 25 days.)		
50	Randy Taylor	June 1979	CWA Show		1	(Note: The exact date the championship change took place is uncertain, which means the reign lasted between 2 and 26 days.)		
51	Ron Bass	July 2, 1979	CWA Show	Memphis, Tennessee	2	56		
52	Bill Dundee	August 27, 1979	CWA Show	Memphis, Tennessee	3	15		
—	Vacated	September 11, 1979	CWA Show	Memphis, Tennessee	—	—	Championship vacated after a match against Ron Bass.	
53	Bill Dundee	September 17, 1979	CWA Show	Memphis, Tennessee	4	7	Defeated Bass in a rematch.	
54	Jerry Lawler	September 24, 1979	CWA Show	Memphis, Tennessee	21	7		
55	Bill Dundee	October 1, 1979	CWA Show	Memphis, Tennessee	5	14		
56	Jerry Lawler	October 15, 1979	CWA Show	Memphis, Tennessee	22	80		
57	Jimmy Valiant	January 3, 1980	CWA Show	Jackson, Tennessee	3	95		
58	Paul Ellering	April 7, 1980	CWA Show	Memphis, Tennessee	1	91		
59	Bill Dundee	July 7, 1980	CWA Show	Memphis, Tennessee	6	28		
—	Vacated	August 4, 1980	—	—	—	—	Title was vacated when Dundee won the CWA World Heavyweight Championship	
60	Bill Irwin	August 11, 1980	CWA Show	Memphis, Tennessee	1	7	Defeated Jimmy Valiant the finals of an eight-man one-night tournament.	
—	Vacated	August 18, 1980	CWA Show	Memphis, Tennessee	—	—	Championship vacated after a match against Jimmy Valliant	
61	Jimmy Valiant	August 25, 1980	CWA Show	Memphis, Tennessee	4	7	Defeated Bill Irwin in a rematch.	
62	Tommy Rich	September 1, 1980	CWA Show	Memphis, Tennessee	3	8		
63	Jimmy Valiant	September 9, 1980	CWA Show	Memphis, Tennessee	5	(Note: The exact date the championship change took place is uncertain, which means the reign lasted between 1 and 27 days.)		
64	Tommy Rich	October 6, 1980 (NLT)	CWA Show		4	(Note: The exact date the championship change took place is uncertain, which means the reign lasted between 52 and 55 days.)		
—	Vacated	November 1980	—	—	—	—	Championship vacated for undocumented reasons	
65	Jimmy Valiant	January 17, 1981	CWA Show	Memphis, Tennessee	6	29	Defeated Hector Guerrero in a tournament final.	
66	Jerry Lawler	February 15, 1981	CWA Show	Memphis, Tennessee	23	127		
67	Jimmy Hart	June 22, 1981	CWA Show	Memphis, Tennessee	1	5		
68	Chick Donovan	June 27, 1981	CWA Show	Memphis, Tennessee	1	(Note: The exact date the championship change took place is uncertain, which means the reign lasted between 4 and 22 days.)	Hart laid down and let Donovan win the title.	
—	Vacated	July 1981	—	—	—	—	Donovan was stripped of the championship because of the way in which he won it.	
69	Steve Keirn	July 20, 1981	CWA Show	Memphis, Tennessee	1	27	Defeated Bugsy McGraw in a tournament final.	
70	The Dream Machine	August 16, 1981	CWA Show	Jackson, Tennessee	1	8		
71	Jerry Lawler	August 24, 1981	CWA Show	Memphis, Tennessee	24	14		
72	The Dream Machine	September 7, 1981	CWA Show	Memphis, Tennessee	2	7		
73	Jimmy Valiant	September 14, 1981	CWA Show	Memphis, Tennessee	7	(Note: The exact date the championship change took place is uncertain, which means the reign lasted between 17 and 41 days.)		
74	The Dream Machine	October 1981	CWA Show	Lexington, Kentucky	3	(Note: The exact date the championship change took place is uncertain, which means the reign lasted between 1 and 25 days.)		
75	Dutch Mantel	October 26, 1981	CWA Show	Memphis, Tennessee	1	84		
76	Jerry Lawler	January 18, 1982	CWA Show	Memphis, Tennessee	25	27		
77	Dutch Mantel	February 14, 1982	CWA Show	Memphis, Tennessee	2	15		
78	Jerry Lawler	March 1, 1982	CWA Show	Memphis, Tennessee	26	21		
79	Dutch Mantel	March 22, 1982	CWA Show	Memphis, Tennessee	3	7		
80	Jerry Lawler	March 29, 1982	CWA Show	Memphis, Tennessee	27	(Note: The exact date the championship change took place is uncertain, which means the reign lasted between 33 and 55 days.)		
81	Kendo Nagasaki	May 1982	CWA Show		1	(Note: The exact date the championship change took place is uncertain, which means the reign lasted between 1 and −1,073 days.)		
82	Jerry Lawler	May 24, 1982	CWA Show	Memphis, Tennessee	28	14		
83	Kamala	June 7, 1982	CWA Show	Memphis, Tennessee	1	63		
84	Jerry Lawler	August 9, 1982	CWA Show	Memphis, Tennessee	29	63		
85	Nick Bockwinkel	October 11, 1982	CWA Show	Memphis, Tennessee	1	28		
86	Jerry Lawler	November 8, 1982	CWA Show	Memphis, Tennessee	30	7		
87	Sabu the Wildman	November 15, 1982	CWA Show	Memphis, Tennessee	1	14	Partnered with Jimmy Hart to defeat Jerry Lawler in a handicap match. Hart got the pin, but Sabu the Wildman was recognized as champion.	
88	Terry Taylor	November 29, 1982	CWA Show	Memphis, Tennessee	1	62		
89	Jacques Rougeau	January 30, 1983	CWA Show	Memphis, Tennessee	1	15		
90	Terry Taylor	February 14, 1983	CWA Show	Memphis, Tennessee	2	35		
91	Bill Dundee	March 21, 1983	CWA Show	Memphis, Tennessee	7	49		
92	Dutch Mantel	May 9, 1983	CWA Show	Memphis, Tennessee	4	7		
93	Bill Dundee	May 16, 1983	CWA Show	Memphis, Tennessee	8	14		
94	Dutch Mantel	May 30, 1983	CWA Show	Memphis, Tennessee	5	0		
95	Jerry Lawler	May 30, 1983	CWA Show	Memphis, Tennessee	31	0		
96	Bill Dundee	May 30, 1983	CWA Show	Memphis, Tennessee	9	7		
97	Jerry Lawler	June 6, 1983	CWA Show	Memphis, Tennessee	32	14		
98	Man Mountain Link	June 20, 1983	CWA Show	Memphis, Tennessee	1	0		
99	Jerry Lawler	June 20, 1983	CWA Show	Memphis, Tennessee	33	(Note: The exact date the championship change took place is uncertain, which means the reign lasted between 11 and 13 days.)		
100	Man Mountain Link	July 1983	CWA Show		2	(Note: The exact date the championship change took place is uncertain, which means the reign lasted between 1 and 4 days.)		
101	Jerry Lawler	July 4, 1983	CWA Show	Memphis, Tennessee	34	(Note: The exact date the championship change took place is uncertain, which means the reign lasted between 59 and 67 days.)		
—	Vacated	September 1983	—	—	—	—	Lawler was stripped of the championship for failing to defend within 30 days.	
102	Jerry Lawler	September 10, 1983	CWA Show	Memphis, Tennessee	35	(Note: The exact date the championship change took place is uncertain, which means the reign lasted between 1 and 20 days.)	Defeated Bill Dundee in a tournament final.	
103	Jesse Ventura	September 1983	CWA Show		1	(Note: The exact date the championship change took place is uncertain, which means the reign lasted between 1 and 19 days.)		
104	Jerry Lawler	October 3, 1983	CWA Show	Memphis, Tennessee	36	7		
105	Jesse Ventura	October 10, 1983	CWA Show	Memphis, Tennessee	2	(Note: The exact date the championship change took place is uncertain, which means the reign lasted between 22 and 51 days.)		
106	Jerry Lawler	November 1983	CWA Show	Chicago, Illinois	37	(Note: The exact date the championship change took place is uncertain, which means the reign lasted between 152 and 181 days.)		
107	Lord Humongous	April 30, 1984	CWA Show	Memphis, Tennessee	1	21	Mike Stark was portraying Lord Humongous at this point in time	
108	Jerry Lawler	May 21, 1984	CWA Show	Memphis, Tennessee	38	21		
109	Rick Rude	June 11, 1984	CWA Show	Memphis, Tennessee	1	35		
110	Tommy Rich	July 16, 1984	CWA Show	Memphis, Tennessee	5	14		
111	King Kong Bundy	July 30, 1984	CWA Show	Memphis, Tennessee	1	105	Special guest referee Eddie Gilbert	
112	Jerry Lawler	November 12, 1984	CWA Show	Memphis, Tennessee	39	77		
—	Vacated	January 28, 1985	CWA Show	Memphis, Tennessee	—	—	Championship vacated after a match against Eddie Gilbert	
113	Eddie Gilbert	February 1985	CWA Show	Memphis, Tennessee	1	(Note: The exact date the championship change took place is uncertain, which means the reign lasted between 1 and 11 days.)	Defeated Jerry Lawler in a rematch.	
114	Jerry Lawler	February 12, 1985	CWA Show	Memphis, Tennessee	40	33		
115	Randy Savage	March 17, 1985	CWA Show	Memphis, Tennessee	1	51		
116	Jerry Oske	May 7, 1985	CWA Show	Louisville, Kentucky	1	6		
117	Randy Savage	May 13, 1985	CWA Show	Memphis, Tennessee	2	21		
118	Jerry Lawler	June 3, 1985	CWA Show	Memphis, Tennessee	41	21		
119	Bota the Witch Doctor	June 24, 1985	CWA Show	Memphis, Tennessee	1	35		
120	Jerry Lawler	July 29, 1985	CWA Show	Memphis, Tennessee	42	18		
121	Taras Bulba	August 16, 1985	CWA Show	Selmer, Tennessee	1	21		
122	Jerry Lawler	September 6, 1985	CWA Show	Martin, Tennessee	43	43		
123	Bill Dundee	October 19, 1985	CWA Show	Memphis, Tennessee	10	63		
124	Jerry Lawler	December 21, 1985	CWA Show	Memphis, Tennessee	44	9		
125	Bill Dundee	December 30, 1985	CWA Show	Memphis, Tennessee	11	99		
126	Jerry Lawler	April 8, 1986	CWA Show	Memphis, Tennessee	45	24		
127	Bill Dundee	May 2, 1986	CWA Show	Memphis, Tennessee	12	31		
128	Buddy Landel	June 2, 1986	CWA Show	Memphis, Tennessee	1	0		
—	Vacated	June 2, 1986	CWA Show	Memphis, Tennessee	—	—	Championship vacated immediately after the match	
129	Buddy Landel	June 16, 1986	CWA Show	Memphis, Tennessee	2	(Note: The exact date the championship change took place is uncertain, which means the reign lasted between 1 and 14 days.)	Defeated The Flame in a tournament final.	
—	Vacated	June 1986	—	—	—	—	Vacated when Buddy Landel left the CWA	
130	Bam Bam Bigelow	July 28, 1986	CWA Show	Memphis, Tennessee	1	42	Won a battle royal.	
131	Jerry Lawler	September 8, 1986	CWA Show	Memphis, Tennessee	46	125		
—	Vacated	January 11, 1987	—	—	—	—	Vacated when Lawler suffered an injury	
132	Austin Idol	February 2, 1987	CWA Show	Memphis, Tennessee	2	77	Defeated Soul Train Jones in a tournament final.	
133	Jerry Lawler	April 20, 1987	CWA Show	Memphis, Tennessee	47	7		
134	Austin Idol	April 27, 1987	CWA Show	Memphis, Tennessee	3	42		
135	Jerry Lawler	June 8, 1987	CWA Show	Memphis, Tennessee	48	28		
136	Brickhouse Brown	July 6, 1987	CWA Show	Memphis, Tennessee	1	7		
137	Jerry Lawler	July 13, 1987	CWA Show	Memphis, Tennessee	49	21		
—	Vacated	August 3, 1987	CWA Show	Memphis, Tennessee	—	—	Vacated after a match against Don Bass	
138	Don Bass	August 3, 1987	CWA Show	Memphis, Tennessee	1	(Note: The exact date the championship change took place is uncertain, which means the reign lasted between 1 and 20 days.)	Partnered with Brickhouse Brown, Bass pinned Lawler, who was partnered with Rocky Johnson, in a tag team match where the title was on the line.	
139	Jerry Lawler	August 1987	CWA Show		50	(Note: The exact date the championship change took place is uncertain, which means the reign lasted between 1 and 20 days.)		
140	Don Bass	August 24, 1987	CWA Show	Memphis, Tennessee	2	7		
141	Jerry Lawler	August 31, 1987	CWA Show	Memphis, Tennessee	51	(Note: The exact date the championship change took place is uncertain, which means the reign lasted between 1 and 30 days.)		
—	Vacated	September 1987	—	—	—	—	Lawler vacated the championship to concentrate on the AWA World Tag Team Championship.	
142	Bobby Jaggers	October 19, 1987	CWA Show	Memphis, Tennessee	1	33	Defeated Billy Travis in a tournament final.	
143	Jerry Lawler	November 21, 1987	CWA Show	Memphis, Tennessee	52	16		
—	Vacated	December 7, 1987	—	—	—	—	The title was unified with the AWA International Heavyweight Championship and the NWA Mid-America Heavyweight Championship to create the CWA Heavyweight Championship	

=== United States Wrestling Association ===
Key
No.	Overall reign number
Reign	Reign number for the specific champion
Days	Number of days held

No.	Champion	Championship change			Reign statistics		Notes	Ref.
No.	Champion	Date	Event	Location	Reign	Days	Notes	Ref.
USWA Southern Heavyweight Championship
1	Dick Slater	September 1, 1990	USWA Show		1	35	Slater won the title in a tournament.	
2	Jeff Jarrett	October 6, 1990	USWA Show	Nashville, Tennessee	1	23		
3	Eddie Gilbert	October 29, 1990	USWA Show	Memphis, Tennessee	1	(Note: The exact date the championship change took place is uncertain, which means the reign lasted between 33 and 63 days.)		
—	Vacated	December 1990	—	—	—	—	Vacated when Eddie Gilbert left the USWA	
4	Jeff Jarrett	January 14, 1991	USWA Show	Memphis, Tennessee	2	42	Defeated Brian Lee in a tournament final.	
—	Vacated	February 25, 1991	USWA Show	Memphis, Tennessee	—	—	Championship was vacated after a match against Steve Austin	
5	Jeff Jarrett	March 1991	USWA Show		3	(Note: The exact date the championship change took place is uncertain, which means the reign lasted between 1 and 15} days.)	Defeated Steve Austin in a rematch.	
6	Tom Prichard	March 15, 1991	USWA Show	Dallas, Texas	1	14		
—	Vacated	March 29, 1991	USWA Show	Dallas, Texas	—	—	Championship vacated after a match against Jeff Jarrett	
7	Jeff Jarrett	April 5, 1991	USWA Show	Dallas, Texas	4	3	Defeated Tom Prichard in a rematch.	
—	Vacated	April 8, 1991	—	—	—	—	The title was vacated due to finish of the Jarrett-Prichard rematch	
8	Jeff Jarrett	April 12, 1991	USWA Show	Dallas, Texas	5	21	Defeated Tom Prichard in a second rematch.	
9	Eric Embry	May 3, 1991	USWA Show	Dallas, Texas	1	10		
10	Bill Dundee	May 13, 1991	USWA Show	Memphis, Tennessee	1	7		
11	Eric Embry	May 20, 1991	USWA Show	Memphis, Tennessee	2	168		
12	Tom Prichard	November 4, 1991	USWA Show	Memphis, Tennessee	2	5		
13	Eric Embry	November 9, 1991	USWA Show	Memphis, Tennessee	3	23		
14	Tom Prichard	December 2, 1991	USWA Show	Memphis, Tennessee	3	7		
15	Eric Embry	December 9, 1991	USWA Show	Memphis, Tennessee	4	61		
16	Tom Prichard	February 8, 1992	USWA Show	Memphis, Tennessee	4	31		
17	Dr. Death	March 10, 1992	USWA Show	Louisville, Kentucky	1	6	Not Dr. Death Steve Williams but a masked Kenny Kendall.	
18	Jimmy Valiant	March 16, 1992	USWA Show	Memphis, Tennessee	1	7		
19	Brian Christopher	March 23, 1992	USWA Show	Memphis, Tennessee	1	28		
—	Vacated	April 20, 1992	—	—	—	—	Championship vacated after a match against Tom Pritchard	
20	Brian Christopher	April 27, 1992	USWA Show	Memphis, Tennessee	2	7	Defeated Tom Prichard in a rematch.	
—	Vacated	May 4, 1992	—	—	—	—	The championship remained vacant up due to the finish of the rematch	
21	Brian Christopher	May 4, 1992	USWA Show	Memphis, Tennessee	3	49	Defeated Tom Prichard in a second rematch.	
—	Vacated	June 22, 1992	—	—	—	—	Championship vacated after a match against Tom Pritchard	
22	Tom Prichard	June 29, 1992	USWA Show	Memphis, Tennessee	5	21	Defeated Brian Christopher in a rematch.	
23	Brian Christopher	July 20, 1992	USWA Show	Memphis, Tennessee	4	7		
24	Tom Prichard	July 27, 1992	USWA Show	Memphis, Tennessee	6	7		
25	Brian Christopher	August 3, 1992	USWA Show	Memphis, Tennessee	5	7		
26	Reno Riggins	August 10, 1992	USWA Show	Memphis, Tennessee	1	35		
—	Vacated	September 14, 1992	USWA Show	Memphis, Tennessee	—	—	Championship vacated after a match against Brian Christopher	
27	Brian Christopher	September 21, 1992	USWA Show	Memphis, Tennessee	6	91	Defeated Reno Riggins in a rematch.	
28	Jeff Jarrett	December 21, 1992	USWA Show	Memphis, Tennessee	6	21		
29	Brian Christopher	January 11, 1993	USWA Show	Memphis, Tennessee	7	49		
30	Jeff Jarrett	March 1, 1993	USWA Show	Memphis, Tennessee	7	61		
31	Brian Christopher	May 1, 1993	USWA Show	Memphis, Tennessee	8	58		
32	Jeff Jarrett	June 28, 1993	USWA Show	Memphis, Tennessee	8	20		
33	Vampire Warrior	July 18, 1993	USWA Show	Memphis, Tennessee	1	36		
34	Jeff Jarrett	August 23, 1993	USWA Show	Memphis, Tennessee	9	21	Renamed the USWA Heavyweight Championship in September 1993	
USWA Heavyweight Championship
35	Tommy Rich	September 13, 1993	USWA Show	Memphis, Tennessee	1	21		
—	Vacated	September 25, 1993	USWA Show	Memphis, Tennessee	—	—	The referee raised Rich's hand in victory after the match when Jeff Jarrett had actually won	
36	Jeff Jarrett	October 4, 1993	USWA Show	Memphis, Tennessee	10	49	Defeated Tommy Rich in a rematch.	
37	Buddy Landel	November 22, 1993	USWA Show	Memphis, Tennessee	1	13		
38	Brian Christopher	December 5, 1993	USWA Show	Memphis, Tennessee	9	64		
39	Doug Gilbert	February 7, 1994	USWA Show	Memphis, Tennessee	1	7		
40	Brian Christopher	February 14, 1994	USWA Show	Memphis, Tennessee	10	7		
41	Doug Gilbert	February 21, 1994	USWA Show	Memphis, Tennessee	2	7		
42	Brian Christopher	February 28, 1994	USWA Show	Memphis, Tennessee	11	14		
43	Eddie Gilbert	March 14, 1994	USWA Show	Memphis, Tennessee	2	5		
44	Brian Christopher	March 19, 1994	USWA Show	Memphis, Tennessee	12	44	Won the title by countout.	
45	Doug Gilbert	May 2, 1994	USWA Show	Memphis, Tennessee	3	7		
46	Brian Christopher	May 9, 1994	USWA Show	Memphis, Tennessee	13	28		
47	The Dream Machine	June 6, 1994	USWA Show	Memphis, Tennessee	1	35		
48	Brian Christopher	July 11, 1994	USWA Show	Memphis, Tennessee	14	21		
49	Doug Gilbert	August 1, 1994	USWA Show	Memphis, Tennessee	4	54		
—	Vacated	September 24, 1994	—	—	—	—	Gilbert was stripped of the title for not defending within 45 days	
50	Tommy Rich	October 3, 1994	USWA Show	Memphis, Tennessee	2	63	Defeated Buddy Landel in a tournament final.	
51	Brian Christopher	December 5, 1994	USWA Show	Memphis, Tennessee	15	14		
52	Tommy Rich	December 19, 1994	USWA Show	Memphis, Tennessee	3	12		
53	Brian Christopher	December 31, 1994	USWA Show	Memphis, Tennessee	16	93		
54	Brian Lee	April 3, 1995	USWA Show	Memphis, Tennessee	1	7		
—	Vacated	April 10, 1995	USWA Show	Memphis, Tennessee	—	—	Vacated after a match against Brian Christopher	
55	Brian Lee	April 17, 1995	USWA Show	Memphis, Tennessee	2	26	Defeated Brian Lee in a rematch.	
56	Doug Gilbert	May 13, 1995	USWA Show	Memphis, Tennessee	5	16		
57	Brian Christopher	May 29, 1995	USWA Show	Memphis, Tennessee	17	28		
58	Billy Jack Haynes	June 26, 1995	USWA Show	Memphis, Tennessee	1	39		
59	Brad Armstrong	August 4, 1995	USWA Show	Knoxville, Tennessee	1	3		
60	Billy Jack Haynes	August 7, 1995	USWA Show	Memphis, Tennessee	2	35		
61	Brian Christopher	September 11, 1995	USWA Show	Memphis, Tennessee	18	26		
62	Jesse James Armstrong	October 7, 1995	USWA Show	Memphis, Tennessee	1	16		
63	Brian Christopher	October 23, 1995	USWA Show	Memphis, Tennessee	19	21		
—	Vacated	November 13, 1995	USWA Show	Memphis, Tennessee	—	—	Championship vacated after a match against Tex Slazenger	
64	Tex Slazenger	November 22, 1995	USWA Show	Memphis, Tennessee	1	5	Defeated Brian Christopher in a rematch.	
65	Brian Christopher	November 27, 1995	USWA Show	Memphis, Tennessee	20	5		
66	Tex Slazenger	December 2, 1995	USWA Show	Memphis, Tennessee	2	39	The title was returned to Slazenger by acting USWA Commissioner Bob Armstrong due to a controversial finish in the November 27 match.	
67	Jerry Lawler	January 10, 1996	USWA Show	Memphis, Tennessee	1	3		
68	Tommy Rich	January 13, 1996	USWA Show	Memphis, Tennessee	4	32		
69	Brian Christopher	February 14, 1996	USWA Show	Memphis, Tennessee	21	31		
70	Mabel	March 16, 1996	USWA Show	Memphis, Tennessee	1	65		
71	Jerry Lawler	May 20, 1996	USWA Show	Memphis, Tennessee	2	12		
72	Brian Christopher	June 1, 1996	USWA Show	Memphis, Tennessee	22	149		
73	Ric Hogan	October 28, 1996	USWA Show	Memphis, Tennessee	1	21		
74	Brian Christopher	November 18, 1996	USWA Show	Memphis, Tennessee	23	26		
75	Wolfie D	December 14, 1996	USWA Show	Memphis, Tennessee	1	19		
76	Brian Christopher	January 2, 1997	USWA Show	Memphis, Tennessee	24	38		
77	Elijah	February 9, 1997	USWA Show	Memphis, Tennessee	1	48		
78	Brian Christopher	March 29, 1997	USWA Show	Memphis, Tennessee	25	77		
79	Billy Travis	June 14, 1997	USWA Show	Memphis, Tennessee	1	28		
80	Spellbinder	July 12, 1997	USWA Show	Memphis, Tennessee	2	1		
81	Doomsday	July 13, 1997	USWA Show	Memphis, Tennessee	1	55		
82	Steven Dunn	September 6, 1997	USWA Show	Memphis, Tennessee	1	(Note: The exact date the championship was abandoned is uncertain, which means the reign lasted between 56 and 85 days.)		
—		November 1997	—	—			The USWA closed	

=== Memphis Championship Wrestling ===
Key
No.	Overall reign number
Reign	Reign number for the specific champion
Days	Number of days held

No.	Champion	Championship change			Reign statistics		Notes	Ref.
No.	Champion	Date	Event	Location	Reign	Days	Notes	Ref.
MCW Southern Heavyweight Championship
1	Jerry Lawler	March 25, 2000	MCW Show	Tunica, Mississippi	1	(Note: The exact date the championship change took place is uncertain, which means the reign lasted between 1 and 18 days.)	Defeated Bull Pain in a tournament final.	
—	Vacated	2000	—	—	—	—	Championship vacated for undocumented reasons	
2	K-Krush	April 12, 2000	MCW Show	Robinsonville, Mississippi	1	42	Won a battle royal, last eliminating Jerry Lawler.	
3	Masked Man #1	May 24, 2000	MCW Show	Tunica, Mississippi	2	28		
4	Lord Steven Regal	June 21, 2000	MCW Show	Memphis, Tennessee	1	59		
5	Joey Abs	August 19, 2000	MCW Show	Memphis, Tennessee	1	0		
6	K-Krush	August 19, 2000	MCW Show	Memphis, Tennessee	2	76		
7	Steve Bradley	November 3, 2000	MCW Show	Manila, Arkansas	1	225		
8	Joey Abs	June 16, 2001	MCW Show	Jackson, Tennessee	2	21		
9	Steve Bradley	July 7, 2001	MCW Show	Manila, Arkansas	2	0		
10	Seven	July 7, 2001	MCW Show	Manila, Arkansas	1	133		
12	Kryptonite	November 17, 2001	MCW Show	Dyersburg, Tennessee	1	(Note: The exact date the championship was abandoned is uncertain, which means the reign lasted between 14 and 44 days.)		
—		December 2001		—			MCW Closed	

=== Memphis Wrestling ===
Key
No.	Overall reign number
Reign	Reign number for the specific champion
Days	Number of days held

No.	Champion	Championship change			Reign statistics		Notes	Ref.
No.	Champion	Date	Event	Location	Reign	Days	Notes	Ref.
Memphis Wrestling Southern Heavyweight Championship
1	Mabel	March 6, 2004	MW Show	Memphis, Tennessee	1	(Note: The exact date the championship change took place is uncertain, which means the reign lasted between 360 and 390 days.)	Defeated Bill Dundee in a tournament final to win the title	
2	Mordecai	March 2005	MW Show	Memphis, Tennessee	1	(Note: The exact date the championship change took place is uncertain, which means the reign lasted between 92 and 152 days.)		
3	Jerry Lawler	July 2005	MW Show	Memphis, Tennessee	1	(Note: The exact date the championship change took place is uncertain, which means the reign lasted between 578 and 638 days.)		
4	Shock	March 2007	MW Show	Memphis, Tennessee	1	(Note: The exact date the championship change took place is uncertain, which means the reign lasted between 367 and 426 days.)		
5	Jerry Lawler	April 2008	MW Show	Memphis, Tennessee	2	(Note: The exact date the championship change took place is uncertain, which means the reign lasted between 1 and 245 days.)	Defeated Shock in a tournament final to unify the Memphis Wrestling Southern Television Championship.	
		2008	N/A	N/A			Championship vacated for undocumented reasons	
6	Brian Christopher	November 4, 2010	Live show	Memphis, Tennessee	1	38	Defeated Derrick King in a tournament final to win the vacant title.	
—	Deactivated	December 12, 2010	—	—	—	—	No known championship defenses after Christopher becomes champion.	
