= CWA World Heavyweight Championship (Memphis) =

- CWA World Heavyweight Championship belt

Details
- Promotion: Continental Wrestling Association
- Date established: April 28, 1979
- Date retired: June 1981
Statistics
- First champion(s): Thunderbolt Patterson
- Final champion(s): Dory Funk, Jr.
- Most reigns: Billy Robinson (3 times)
- Longest reign: Billy Robinson (165 days)
- Shortest reign: Billy Robinson (2 days)

The CWA World Heavyweight Championship was a professional wrestling world heavyweight championship in the American promotion, the Continental Wrestling Association. It existed from 1979 to 1981.

== Title history ==
Key
| No. | Overall reign number |
| Reign | Reign number for the specific champion |
| Days | Number of days held |

| No. | Champion | Championship change | | | Reign statistics | | Notes | Ref. |
| No. | Champion | Date | Event | Location | Reign | Days | Notes | Ref. |
|---|---|---|---|---|---|---|---|---|
| 1 | Thunderbolt Patterson | April 28, 1979 | House show | Memphis, Tennessee | 1 | (Note: The exact date Patterson won the championship and left the CWA are uncertain, which means the length of the reign is too uncertain to calculate.) | This was the first date that Patterson was acknowledged as champion. He was said to have defeated Mark Lewin in January 1979 in Melbourne, Australia to become the first champion. | |
| — | Vacated | June 1979 | — | — | — | — | Thunderbolt Patterson left the CWA | |
| 2 | Pat McGinnis | October 2, 1979 | House show | Louisville, Kentucky | 1 | 8 | Defeated Hector Guerrero. | |
| 3 | "Superstar" Billy Graham | October 8, 1979 | House show | Memphis, Tennessee | 1 | 31 | | |
| 4 | Jerry Lawler | November 8, 1979 | House show | Lexington, Kentucky | 1 | 74 | | |
| — | Vacated | January 21, 1980 | — | — | — | — | Vacated after a match against Bill Dundee | |
| 5 | Billy Robinson | April 28, 1980 | House show | Memphis, Tennessee | 1 | 98 | Defeated The Masked Superstar. | |
| 6 | Bill Dundee | August 4, 1980 | House show | Memphis, Tennessee | 1 | 7 | | |
| 7 | Billy Robinson | August 11, 1980 | House show | Memphis, Tennessee | 2 | 56 | | |
| 8 | Austin Idol | October 6, 1980 | House show | Memphis, Tennessee | 1 | 14 | | |
| 9 | Bobby Eaton | October 20, 1980 | House show | Memphis, Tennessee | 1 | 7 | Won the title by forfeit. | |
| 10 | Billy Robinson | October 27, 1980 | House show | Memphis, Tennessee | 3 | (Note: The exact date that Robinson lost the championship is uncertain, which means that the championship reign lasted between 1 day and 185 days.) | | |
| 11 | Dory Funk Jr. | April 1981 (NLT) | House show | (Note: The location of the championship change has not been documented.) | 1 | (Note: The exact date that Dory Funk Jr. won the championship and the championship was abandoned are unknown, which means the reign is too uncertain to calculate.) | | |
| — | Deactivated | 1981 | — | — | — | — | | |

== See also ==
- Continental Wrestling Association
- CWA World Tag Team Championship
