= Mr. Pogo =

Japanese professional wrestler (1951–2017)

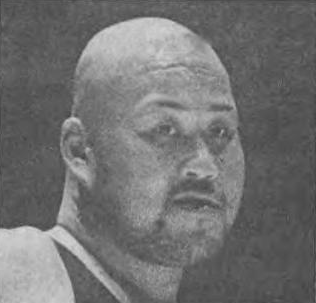
- Sekigawa, c. 1980

Personal information
- Born: February 5, 1951 Isesaki, Gunma, Japan
- Died: June 23, 2017 (aged 66) Saitama, Japan

Professional wrestling career
- Ring name(s): The Great Pogo; The Great Seki; Judo Lee; Mr. Pogo; Mr. Sekigawa; Mr. Togo; Ninja; The Ninja Warrior; Pogo Daio; Tetsuo Pogo
- Billed height: 1.83 m (6 ft 0 in)
- Billed weight: 129 kg (284 lb)
- Trained by: Joo Sekigawa
- Debut: March 20, 1972
- Retired: 2016

Tetsuo Sekigawa (関川 哲夫, Sekigawa Tetsuo; February 5, 1951 – June 23, 2017) was a Japanese professional wrestler best known for his work under the ring name Mr. Pogo (ミスター・ポーゴ, Misutā Pōgo). He helped popularize hardcore wrestling in the 1990s with "death matches" in promotions such as Frontier Martial-Arts Wrestling, W*ING and Big Japan Pro Wrestling.

== Career ==
=== New Japan Pro-Wrestling (1972–1973) ===
He was originally a decent amateur, having a pre-professional dispute with the future Jumbo Tsuruta over team representation in the Japanese collegiate championships. He joined Japan Pro Wrestling Alliance but did not debut there, instead joining the new New Japan Pro-Wrestling promotion's NJPW Dojo and debuting in 1972.

=== Canada (1973–1975) ===
Quickly frustrated with NJPW's rigid norms, he quit in 1973 and wandered the wrestling circuits of North America. He started in Canada, first in Calgary for Stampede Wrestling, where he wrestled for a year under the name Judo Lee. He then moved west to Vancouver for NWA All-Star Wrestling, wrestling there for a year under his real name.

=== United States (1973–1979) ===
Also in 1973, he moved down to the United States. His first American stop was in Georgia Championship Wrestling. In 1975, he made his debut in the NWA's Central States territory under the name The Great Seki, where he spent nearly three years in Kansas City, wrestling the likes of Bob Geigel, Jake Roberts, Akio Sato, Harley Race, and Bulldog Bob Brown.

=== International Wrestling Enterprise (1976–1977) ===
From September 1976 to January 1977 he returned to Japan, to International Wrestling Enterprise as Mr. Seki. He didn't compete above the mid-card level.

In 1978, he moved east to the Tennessee area under the name The Ninja Warrior, where he was managed by Tojo Yamamoto. Within months, he moved down to Texas to wrestle for Southwest Championship Wrestling, before heading to NWA Western States, where he won two Tag Team Championships with Mr. Sato. It was in Texas where he started going by the name Mr. Pogo, due to the constant misinterpretation of his ring name, Mr. Togo, by magazines and promoters.

=== Return to Canada (1979–1980) ===
In 1979, he returned to Stampede in Calgary, this time under the name Mr. Sekigawa, and he won the Stampede North American Heavyweight Championship on December 8, 1979, defeating Don Gagne for the title. Nearly two weeks later, he won the vacant Stampede Wrestling International Tag Team Championship with the Dynamite Kid, making him a double champion. A month later, he lost both titles: the North American Heavyweight Championship to Leo Burke, and the International Tag Team Championship to Keith and Bret Hart.

=== Return to United States (1980–1985) ===
In 1980, he returned to the United States and back under the name Mr. Pogo. His first stop on his second American excursion is for the NWA's Tri-State territory, where he spent a year wrestling the likes of Wahoo McDaniel, Butch Reed (He was over in Florida), and The Spoiler. In 1981, he moved east to the Mid-Atlantic territory, where he spent nearly three years there as Ninja, wrestling the likes of Johnny Weaver, Jimmy Valiant, Blackjack Mulligan, Ivan Koloff, Jay Youngblood, Barry Windham, Don Kernodle, Buddy Landell, Leroy Brown, Mike Davis, Lord Alfred Hayes, Iceman "King" Parsons, and Porkchop Cash. In 1984, he moved back to the Central States territory in Kansas City, where he spent a year over there, winning its Heavyweight Championship and the Tag Team Championship with Gypsy Joe. In his return to Kansas City, he wrestled the likes of Dick the Bruiser, Rufus R. Jones, D.J. Peterson, Mark Youngblood, and Marty Jannetty.

=== Return to New Japan (1985–1988) ===
In 1985, Mr. Pogo returned to Japan and to NJPW with a new tag team partner in Kendo Nagasaki. Together, they were known as The Ninja Express. They took part in a league to determine the inaugural IWGP Tag Team Champions; they placed seventh with seven points. In 1987, they took part in a Japan Cup Tag League, where they placed seventh with nine points. The Ninja Express left NJPW in June 1988.

=== World Wrestling Council (1987–1991) ===
During the tail end of the Ninja Express' NJPW run, Mr. Pogo began wrestling for World Wrestling Council in Puerto Rico in 1987, wrestling the likes of Ricky Santana and TNT. By the time the Ninja Express left NJPW in June 1988, he and Nagasaki were wrestling for WWC full-time. In July 1988, the Bruiser Brody murder scandal greatly damaged the wrestling scene in Puerto Rico, causing Pogo to work at a local plastic molding plant, while wrestling, due to the massive decrease in attendance and sales. At the same time, he held five WWC World Tag Team Championships, once with TNT and four times with Nagasaki. After Nagasaki left to return to NJPW, before heading to WCW, Pogo carried on the Ninja Express legacy, teaming with Kensuke Sasaki, winning two WWC Caribbean Tag Team Championships in 1989. He also held the WWC World Junior Heavyweight Championship once, despite being over the weight limit, before leaving WWC in 1991. He never returned to the Americas to wrestle afterwards.

=== Frontier Martial-Arts Wrestling (1990–1991) ===
In June 1990, he was back in Japan, this time for Frontier Martial-Arts Wrestling, which was an upstart promotion that specialized in death matches. He debuted in FMW on June 2, 1990, seconding Tarzan Goto in his match with Ricky Fuji. Immediately, Pogo feuded with Atsushi Onita, partaking in various deathmatches, which eventually became Pogo's specialty.

=== Wrestling International New Generations (1991–1993) ===
In the summer of 1991, Pogo left FMW, because he wanted more interesting matches to compete in, and moved to Wrestling International New Generations (W*ING), where he partook in innovated deathmatches with everyone, ranging from veterans like Kim Duk and Kevin Sullivan to up and coming stars like Mitsuhiro Matsunaga and Yukihiro Kanemura, among others. He won one World Tag Team Championship with Crash The Terminator. A bitter contract dispute forced him to leave W*ING in June 1993.

=== Return to FMW and retirement (1993–1996) ===
Pogo returned to FMW in July 1993 and resumed his feud with Atsushi Onita. During this period, he wrestled periodically for Michinoku Pro Wrestling, New Tokyo Pro Wrestling, and Big Japan Pro Wrestling. He won two FMW Brass Knuckles Heavyweight Championships and three FMW Brass Knuckles Tag Team Championships, one each with Hisakatsu Oya, The Gladiator, and Yukihiro Kanemura. An injury nearly ended Pogo's career at Summer Spectacular, on August 1, 1996 during a Double Hell Death Match against Terry Funk when the match was cut short, after Funk blew fire at Pogo, who dropped into the exploding barbed wire outside of the ring. When falling into it, the barbed wire pushed his chin and head back, breaking his neck. Funk, not knowing why Pogo was still down, began blowing fire at him, stuck in the barbed wire, causing the referee to end the match and award it to Funk via knockout. Pogo returned to the ring, but the injury made him even more immobile. His last match as an active FMW wrestler took place at Year End Spectacular on December 11, 1996, teaming with Masato Tanaka, Tetsuhiro Kuroda, and the returning Atsushi Onita to defeat Terry Funk, Hisakatsu Oya, and The Headhunters in what was considered Pogo's retirement match.

=== Comeback (1997–2016) ===
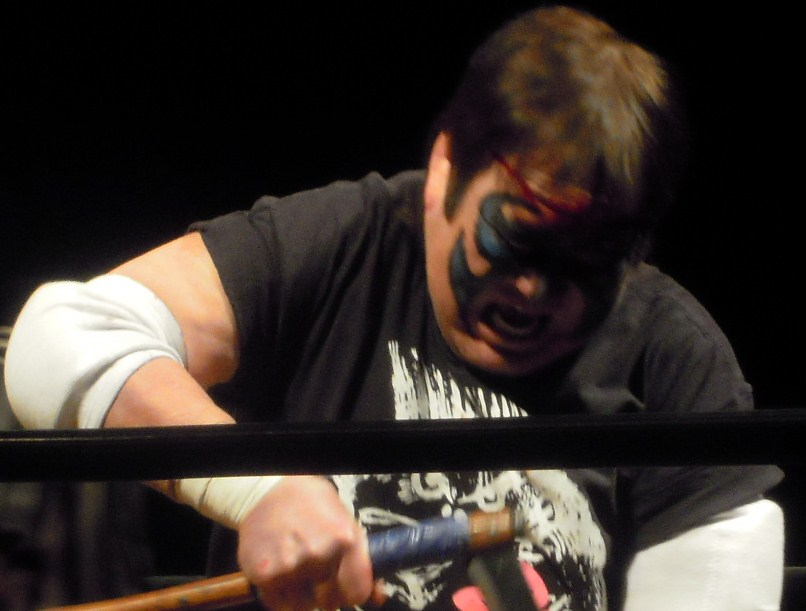
Sekigawa, c. 2011

His retirement did not last, as he returned to wrestling in July 1997 for Big Japan Pro Wrestling. In 1998, he became the inaugural BJW Deathmatch Heavyweight Champion. After losing the title, he left BJW and briefly returned to FMW to feud with Atsushi Onita one more time, before leaving in November 1998.

From 1999–2016, Pogo was freelancer, wrestling for promotions including IWA Japan, SPWF, Onita FMW, Shin-W*ING, Shin-FMW, Onita Pro, and his own promotion, WWS.

== Personal life ==
In 2003, he ran for a Senate seat in his hometown, but was defeated in the polls.

Sekigawa was rushed to a hospital in February 2007 with a bleeding gastric ulcer and spent three weeks there.

== Death ==
In 2014, Sekigawa underwent a spinal canal surgery. On May 25, 2017, Sekigawa underwent a second spinal canal surgery due to the lingering pain. Massive blood loss during the second surgery resulted in doctors deeming it too dangerous to continue and it was halted mid-way through. Sekigawa remained in a Gunma hospital, until surgery was attempted again on June 22, nearly a month after the previous surgery attempt. During the surgery, Sekigawa's blood pressure dropped to the point where he began experiencing an irregular heartbeat, resulting in a cerebral infarction. Sekigawa was transferred to a hospital in Saitama, where he died on June 23 at the age of 66.

== Championships and accomplishments ==
- Big Japan Pro Wrestling
  - BJW Deathmatch Heavyweight Championship (1 time)
- Central States Wrestling
  - NWA Central States Heavyweight Championship (1 time)
  - NWA Central States Tag Team Championship (1 time) – with Gypsy Joe
- Frontier Martial Arts Wrestling
  - FMW Brass Knuckles Heavyweight Championship (2 times)
  - FMW Brass Knuckles Tag Team Championship (3 times) – with Hisakatsu Ooya (1), The Gladiator (1), and Yukihiro Kanemura (1)
  - FMW Tag Team Tournament (1991) - with The Gladiator
- Japan Indie Awards
  - Lifetime Achievement Award (2017)
- NWA Tri-State
  - NWA Tri-State Heavyweight Championship (2 times)
- Stampede Wrestling
  - Stampede North American Heavyweight Championship (1 time)
  - Stampede International Tag Team Championship (1 times) – with Dynamite Kid
- Western States Sports
  - NWA Brass Knuckles Championship (Amarillo version) (1 time)
  - NWA Western States Tag Team Championship (2 times) – with Mr. Sato
- NWA Mid-America
  - NWA Mid-America Tag Team Championship (1 time) – with Tojo Yamamoto
  - NWA Six-Man Tag Team Championship (1 time) – with Tojo Yamamoto and David Schultz
- World Wrestling Council
  - WWC Caribbean Tag Team Championship (2 times) – with Kensuke Sasaki
  - WWC World Junior Heavyweight Championship (1 time)
  - WWC World Tag Team Championship (5 times) – TNT (1) and Kendo Nagasaki (4)
- Wrestling International New Generations
  - W*ING Tag Team Championship (1 time) – with Crash the Terminator
