= Gypsy Joe =

Puerto Rican professional wrestler (1933–2016)

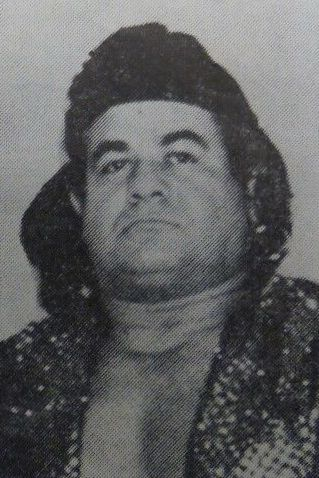
- Joe in 1975

Personal information
- Born: Gilberto Meléndez; December 2, 1933 Orocovis, Puerto Rico
- Died: June 15, 2016 (aged 82) Nashville, Tennessee, U.S.

Professional wrestling career
- Ring name(s): Aztec Joe; Blue Inferno; El Grande Pistolero; Gene Madrid; Gypsy Joe; Jan Madrid; Inferno I Baby Grandpa
- Billed height: 5 ft 9 in (1.75 m)
- Billed weight: 224 lb (102 kg)
- Billed from: Villalba, Puerto Rico
- Trained by: Pampero Firpo
- Debut: 1951
- Retired: 2011

Gilberto Meléndez (December 2, 1933 – June 15, 2016) was a Puerto Rican professional wrestler better known under the ring name Gypsy Joe. While attaining much of his United States success in the Tennessee area, Meléndez also gained a following in Japan. His career lasted six decades, and his highly physical brawling style and tough reputation made him an early pioneer of the hardcore wrestling scene.

== Professional wrestling career ==
=== Early career ===
Meléndez began his wrestling career in 1951 at age 18. During a lengthy tenure in his native Puerto Rico, he went under various monikers and learned the ropes with the likes of Pedro Morales and Carlos Colón Sr. Meléndez made his mainland United States debut at Sunnyside Garden Arena in Sunnyside, Queens, New York City in 1963. Primarily using the name Gypsy Joe by this point, he mainly worked for Nick Gulas and later Jerry Jarrett in the Southeastern region, particularly Mid-Southern Wrestling. During his Gulas run, he was often teamed with heels like Tojo Yamamoto, with whom he formed the No Pain Train, and The Cuban Assassin. He also joined forces with Frank Martinez to be collectively known as the Blue Infernos. The masked duo would attain tag team championships on numerous occasions. By the 1970s, Gypsy Joe was a local star of Chattanooga, Tennessee, regularly performing at Soldiers and Sailors Memorial Auditorium on Saturdays and appearing on local WDEF-TV. His career wasn't limited to the South, however, winning championships around the country as well as in Canada's Stampede Wrestling.

However, with the rise of national promotions like the World Wrestling Federation and World Championship Wrestling in the 1980s, the local industry that Joe had developed a career in began to dwindle. He would not be among those fortunate enough to find success in the major US promotions. Joe eventually made his way overseas into the Japanese wrestling scene, to work for All Japan Pro Wrestling where his highly physical brawling style akin to The Sheik and Abdullah the Butcher was met with success. Bloody encounters with the likes of Mr. Pogo and a penchant for taunting his opponents to attack him with weapons earned Joe a strong reputation in the death match scene and helped solidify his cult following in the region. Despite his aging body, Joe remained active in Japan throughout the 1980s and 1990s where he also refereed and mentored upcoming stars of the hardcore style.

=== Return to the United States and retirement ===
After many taxing years in the ring, an elderly Gypsy Joe returned to the United States in the 2000s where he performed on the independent circuit primarily in the Southeast. In 2001, he attended the International Wrestling Association's Juicio Final event held in his native Puerto Rico, where he received the recognition of the promotion.

In April 2003, a 69-year-old Joe faced New Jack in an infamous hardcore match before a small crowd. Due to Joe's no-selling throughout the match and headbutting New Jack hard on the nose, New Jack legitimately attacked Joe with a chain, a baseball bat wrapped in barbed wire, and several other weapons. With audience members angrily shouting racial slurs at Jack, the match ended in a chaotic no-contest and became a widely circulated viral video. New Jack was then arrested and charged with assault with a weapon.

During this period, although mainly working in his home state of Tennessee, the haggard Gypsy Joe maintained his reputation as a resilient veteran with indie appearances throughout the US. On July 30, 2005, he was enlisted as the special guest referee for CZW Tournament of Death IV held in New Castle, Delaware. The tournament featured various performers that credit Joe for pioneering the in-ring style they now emulate. In 2007, WWE Magazine named Gypsy Joe the world's oldest wrestler at the age of 73. On February 13, 2010, he appeared in the corner of Eddie Kingston and Necro Butcher as Butcher's mentor for their No Rules tag team match at the Ring of Honor 8th Anniversary Show in New York City.

Joe wrestled his last match at the Gypsy Joe retirement show on January 7, 2011. Held in Tullahoma, Tennessee by the Southern Wrestling Federation, the bout marked an end to a career which began 60 years prior.

== Legacy ==
Gypsy Joe was a professional wrestler whose career spanned seven decades, lasting from the 1950s until his retirement in the 2010s. While he did not acquire mainstream prominence in many United States promotions, he established a distinct career within independent and international circuits.

Gypsy Joe was inducted into the Tennessee Wrestling Hall of Fame on November 7, 2015, by Mick Foley at Money Mark Productions' event "A Night with Foley" at the Nashville Fairgrounds.

== Personal life ==
Meléndez was born in Orocovis, Puerto Rico He had a daughter and a nephew who served as his manager.

In August 2013, Meléndez had his right foot amputated after suffering from gout and rickets. He died in June 2016 while hospitalized in Nashville.

== Championships and accomplishments ==
- American International Wrestling
  - AIW West Virginia Heavyweight Championship (3 times)
- Central States Wrestling
  - NWA Central States Tag Team Championship (1 time) – with Mr. Pogo
  - NWA Central States Television Championship (1 time)
  - NWA Southern Tag Team Championship (Georgia version) (1 time) – with Skull Murphy
- International Championship Wrestling
  - ICW United States Tag Team Championship (1 time) – with Tojo Yamamoto
- Grand Prix Wrestling ( Quebec )
  - Grand Prix World Heavyweight Championship ( 1 time )
- Superstar Wrestling (Quebec)
  - International Tag Team Championship ( 1 time ) - with Yasu Fuji
- Memphis Wrestling Hall of Fame
  - Class of 2022
- Mid-Atlantic Championship Wrestling
  - NWA Southern Tag Team Championship (Mid-Atlantic version) (1 time) - with Louis Tillet
- NWA Mid-America
  - NWA Mid-America Tag Team Championship (7 times) – with Leroy Rochester (1), Dutch Mantel (1), Buzz Tyler (1), Tojo Yamamoto (3), and Tom Renesto, Jr. (1)
  - NWA Six-Man Tag Team Championship (1 time) – with Tojo Yamamoto & The Beast
  - NWA Southern Tag Team Championship (Mid-America version) (1 time) – with Frank Martinez
  - NWA World Brass Knuckles Championship (4 times)
  - NWA World Tag Team Championship (Mid-America version) (2 times) – with Frank Martinez
- NWA Western States Sports
  - NWA Western States Tag Team Championship (1 time) - with Killer Tim Brooks
- Pro Wrestling Illustrated
  - PWI ranked him #432 of the top 500 singles wrestlers in the PWI 500 in 1991
- Southern Wrestling Federation
  - SWF Hardcore Championship (1 time)
- Stampede Wrestling
  - Stampede Wrestling International Tag Team Championship (1 time) - with Jim Wright
- Tennessee Wrestling Alliance
  - TWA Hardcore Championship (2 times)
- United States Wrestling Association
  - USWA Junior Heavyweight Championship (1 time)
- World Wrestling Council
  - WWC North American Tag Team Championship (3 times) - with Infierno II

== Luchas de Apuestas record ==
Winner (wager)	Loser (wager)	Location	Event	Date	Notes
Gypsy Joe (ringlets)	George Grant (hair)	Estevan, Saskatchewan	Live event	July 16, 1960	

== See also ==
- Professional wrestling in Puerto Rico
