= David Schultz (professional wrestler) =

American professional wrestler (born 1955)

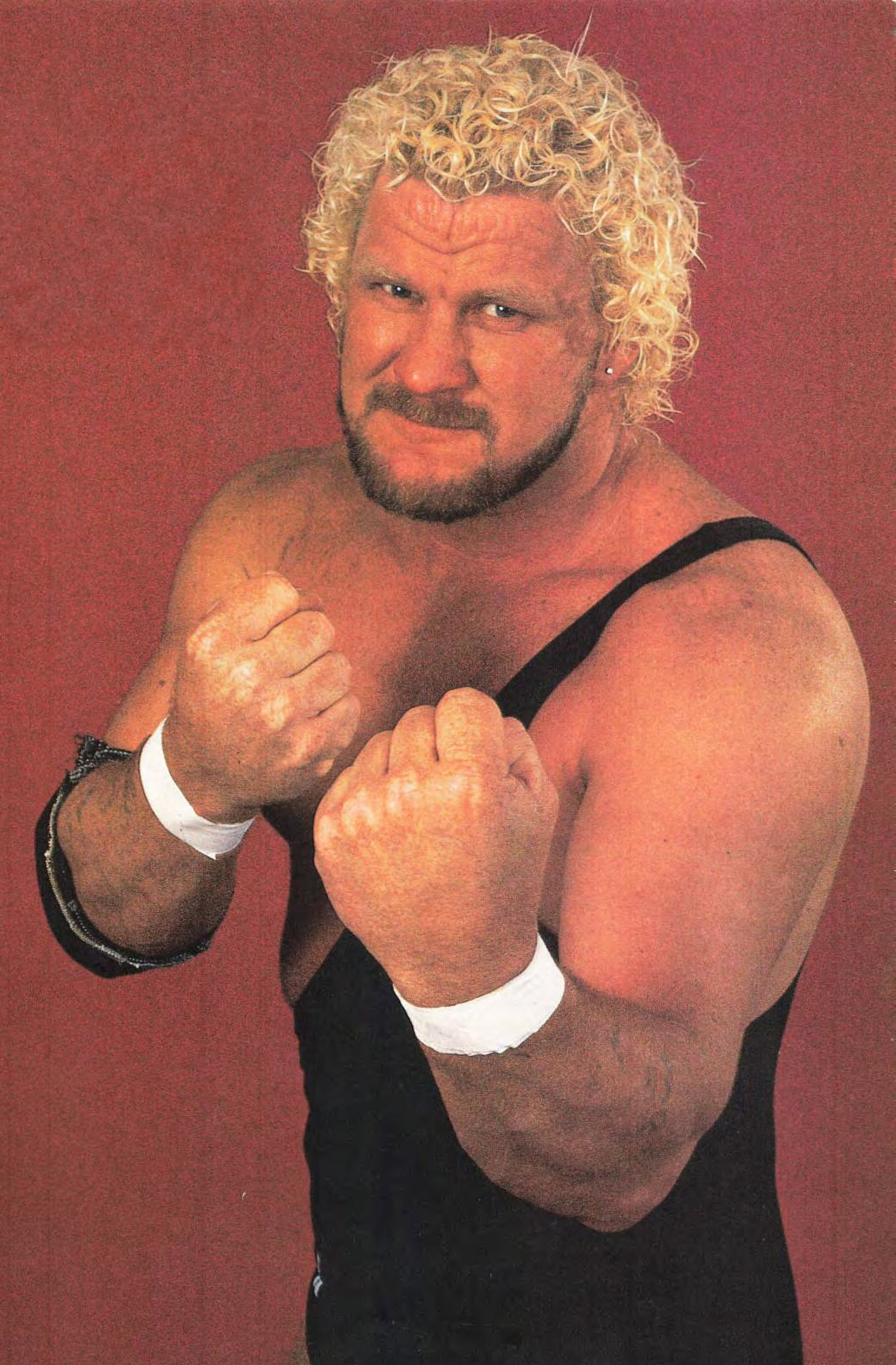
- Schultz, c. 1985

Personal information
- Born: June 1, 1955 (age 71) Madison County, Tennessee, U.S.

Professional wrestling career
- Ring name(s): David Schultz; David Von Schultz
- Billed height: 6 ft 6 in (198 cm)
- Billed weight: 267 lb (121 kg)
- Billed from: Nashville, Tennessee
- Trained by: Herb Welch
- Debut: 1974
- Retired: 1989

David Schultz (born June 1, 1955) is an American retired professional wrestler. Nicknamed "Dr. D", he competed in North American regional promotions Stampede Wrestling, the National Wrestling Alliance, and the American Wrestling Association in the late 1970s and early 1980s. During his short stint in the World Wrestling Federation in 1984, he gained notoriety by assaulting 20/20 reporter John Stossel during a report on the legitimacy of professional wrestling.

== Professional wrestling career ==
=== Early career (1974–1980) ===
Trained by Herb Welch, Schultz began wrestling in NWA Mid-America during the mid-1970s eventually teaming with Roger Kirby to defeat Bill Dundee and Big Bad John for the NWA Mid-America Tag Team Championship in May 1976. He would also team with Bill Ash to win the NWA Mid-America Tag Team Championship before losing the titles to George Gulas and Gorgeous George Jr. later that year.

While in the Maritimes, Schultz defeated Terry Sawyer for the Canadian Heavyweight Championship in Halifax, Nova Scotia on August 9, 1977. Feuding with Sawyer over the title, he would briefly lose the title back to Sawyer before regaining it on August 13 and remained champion until the title became inactive before the end of the year.

From September to October 1978, Schultz toured Japan with International Wrestling Enterprise as part of its "Dynamite Series". His matches on this tour included a cage match against Katsuzo Oiyama in Isehara, Kanagawa and a handful of matches against Animal Hamaguchi that ended in double count-outs or disqualifications. During the tour, he teamed on several occasions with Ox Baker.

Although losing to Bob Armstrong in a match for the NWA Southeastern Heavyweight Championship in 1978, Schultz later regained the title the following year feuding over the title with Ron Slinker in mid-1979. Teaming with Dennis Condrey, the two later won the NWA Southeast Tag Team Championship after defeating Dick Slater and Paul Orndorff in November 1979 and successfully defended the titles for several months before the title was held up during a match against Mike Stallings and The Matador on February 3, 1980, and lost the titles to them in a rematch a week later.

=== Canada (1980–1983) ===
In June 1980, Schultz returned to The Maritimes, where he wrestled as "David Von Schultz" in Atlantic Grand Prix Wrestling. Later that month he became the inaugural AGPW United States Heavyweight Champion. After defending the title against veterans such as Leo Burke, Stephen Petitpas, and the Great Malumba throughout the summer, he eventually lost the title while he and the Cuban Assassin feuded with AGPW North American Tag Team Champions Leo Burke and Stephen Petitpas during his last weeks in the region.

In October 1980, Schultz moved on to Stu Hart's Stampede Wrestling. Schultz became part of Foley's Army feuding with Leo Burke and Mr. Hito over the Stampede Wrestling North American Heavyweight Championship during 1981 and also faced AWA World champion Nick Bockwinkel in a non-title interpromotional match. He also briefly teamed with Honky Tonk Wayne as the Memphis Mafia before Wayne turned on him in a storyline in which he had been "bought" by manager J.R. Foley. Schultz wrestled for Stampede Wrestling until May 1983.

In June 1983, Schultz continued his feud with Honky Tonk Wayne in Vancouver All-Star Wrestling, ultimately defeating Wayne in a cage match in Vancouver, British Columbia. Schultz subsequently returned to the United States to join the American Wrestling Association.

=== American Wrestling Association (1983) ===
In July 1983, Schultz began wrestling for the American Wrestling Association (AWA). His early opponents included Brad Rheingans, Jim Brunzell, and Buck Zumhofe. In August 1983, Schultz and Mr. Saito began feuding with Hulk Hogan, facing him in a series of handicap matches. The feud lasted until November 1983 when Hogan and André the Giant defeated Schultz, Mr. Saito, and Jerry Blackwell in a handicap match in the Salt Palace. Schultz made his final appearances with the AWA in December 1983, defeating Baron von Raschke in Green Bay, Wisconsin.

=== World Wrestling Federation (1983–1985) ===
World Wrestling Federation (WWF) promoter Vince McMahon had become impressed with Schultz after watching an interview in the AWA in which Schultz had made derogatory remarks about Hulk Hogan. Schultz debuted in the WWF in December 1983, defeating Jimmy Jackson on an episode of Wrestling at the Chase. Within a short time, he had become one of the top "heels" in the promotion being aligned with Roddy Piper, Bob Orton and Paul Orndorff in their feud with "Superfly" Jimmy Snuka and later teamed with Piper and Orndorff to defeat S. D. Jones, Rocky Johnson and Bobo Brazil in a 6-man tag team match at the Capital Centre in Landover, Maryland. On June 17, he would also face WWF World Heavyweight Champion Hulk Hogan in Minneapolis, Minnesota.

==== Battery on John Stossel ====
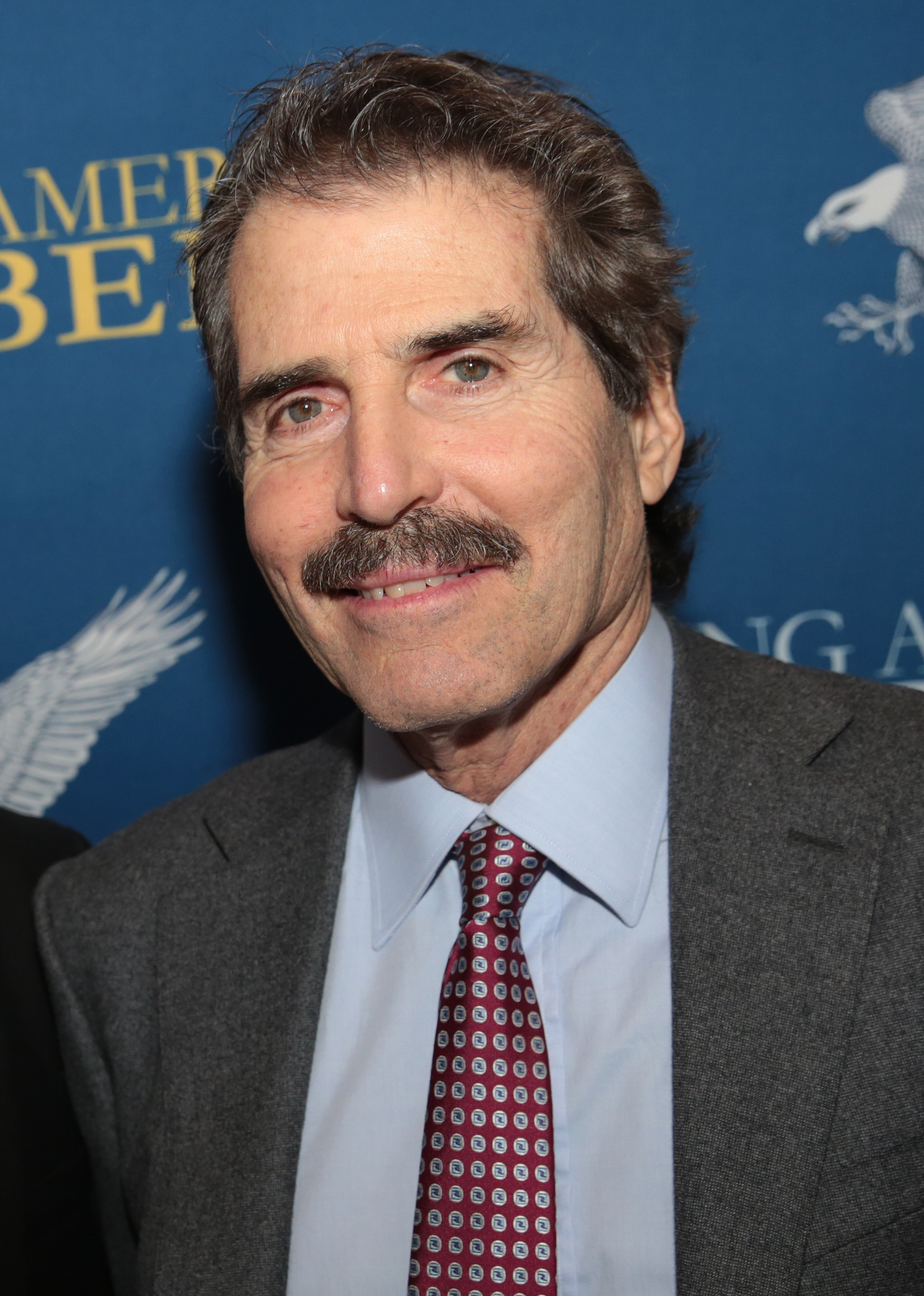
Schultz engaged in a 1984 incident with reporter John Stossel (pictured here in 2018) that severely damaged Schultz' career in the United States.

Schultz had a notorious encounter on December 28, 1984, with 20/20 reporter John Stossel while Stossel was backstage at MSG doing a story about professional wrestling's secrets. During an interview, Stossel told Schultz that he thought pro wrestling was fake (which was already widely assumed), and Schultz's response was to slap Stossel in the head twice, knocking him to the floor each time. The attack, which attracted a large amount of media coverage, was later aired on national television including ABC News which reported that the network had received more than 1,000 calls from viewers inquiring about Stossel's health.

(Stossel: I think this is fake.) Schultz: You think it's fake, hmm? (slaps Stossel) What's that; is that fake? Huh? What the hell is wrong with you? That's open hand slap, huh [sic]. You think it's fake; (slaps Stossel for a second time) you talking about 'this is fake'? Huh? What you mean?

Marvin Kohn, a deputy commissioner at the NYSAC, had been present at the arena during the incident and immediately suspended Schultz for his actions. Although called by Commissioner Jose Torres to attend a hearing before the commission, Kohn later reported that Schultz had written a letter to the commission admitting "that he had acted improperly and apologized both to the commission and to Mr. Stossel" and further stated "I admit the allegations ... I intend the commission to know that I did not intend to hurt John Stossel. I apologize to the commission and to John Stossel."

Stossel stated that he suffered from pain and buzzing in his ears eight weeks after the assault. Stossel later claimed he was unaware of Schultz's apology and would pursue his action in court although commented he would be "less likely to sue" if the after-effects of his injury disappeared. Stossel eventually filed a lawsuit against the WWF, and settled out of court for $425,000 (equivalent to $1,272,000 in 2025).

Although Schultz has consistently maintained that WWF officials told him to hit Stossel (specifically, he insists that Vince McMahon himself said, "Blast him (Stossel), tear his ass up, stay in character -- 'Doctor D'..."), Schultz ultimately was fired. Many industry insiders believe that it was not because of his actions against Stossel, but rather because of the alleged, but never proven, claim that he challenged Mr. T to a fight backstage at a WWF event at MSG.

=== Late career (1985–1989) ===
After leaving the WWF at the end of February 1985, Schultz immediately embarked on another tour of Japan with New Japan Pro-Wrestling as part of its "Big Fight" series. His opponents during the tour included Antonio Inoki, Kantaro Hoshino, and Kengo Kimura. After returning from Japan, he divided his time between the CWA and the Northeastern United States–based International World Class Championship Wrestling for the remainder of the year. In mid-1986, Schultz returned to Stampede Wrestling, where he feuded with Duke Myers, including facing him in coal miner's glove matches. In late-1985, Schultz moved to Lutte Internationale, where he defeated Samula Anoa'i to win the vacant Canadian International Heavyweight Championship. Schultz wrestled sporadically over the following years, making a handful of appearances with the North American Wrestling Association, Central States Wrestling, and the Tri-State Wrestling Alliance. He retired in 1989.

=== Retirement ===
Moving to Connecticut, Schultz opened a successful bail bonds business and began a second career as a professional bounty hunter.

In 1992, Schultz was accused by the WWF of conspiring with former WWF referee Rita Chatterton to extort $5 million from the company. Vince and Linda McMahon filed a lawsuit against journalist and TV personality Geraldo Rivera after Chatterton aired a rape allegation against Vince McMahon during Rivera's programs. The lawsuit was abandoned after McMahon was indicted for allegedly illegally distributing anabolic steroids.

Schultz briefly reappeared in the spotlight in the early 1990s when he testified at McMahon's trial. Although Hulk Hogan was considered to be the prosecution's major witness, Schultz was one of several former WWF wrestlers called to testify against McMahon at the trial although McMahon would eventually be acquitted of all charges against him.

During the early 2000s, Schultz was under consideration for induction into the Professional Wrestling Hall of Fame and Museum in November 2003, and the following month, attended the Fan Slam Convention in Totowa, New Jersey on December 6, 2003 where he talked about his history with Hulk Hogan. During the event, he participated in a Q&A panel which included Ted DiBiase, Virgil, Gary Michael Cappetta, Chief Jay Strongbow and The Missing Link.

In October 2006, Schultz was honored along with J. J. Dillon and Missy Hyatt at a dinner banquet hosted by the Professional Wrestling Hall of Fame and attended by former WWF wrestlers from the 1970s and 80s. During the event, he participated on a Q&A panel discussing the Professional Wrestling Hall of Fame and taking questions from audience members as well as conducted a "shoot interview" with RF Video. As part of their agreement, RF Video donated $500 in his name to the Professional Wrestling Hall of Fame Building Fund and later presenting a check to Professional Wrestling Hall of Fame President Tony Vellano.

Schultz released his book, Don't Call Me Fake, on January 23, 2018.

On April 28, 2020, Dark Side of the Ring aired a second season episode that focuses on Schultz's wrestling career, his on-air assault of John Stossel, and his subsequent transition into a career as a bounty hunter.

== Championships and accomplishments ==
- Atlantic Grand Prix Wrestling
  - AGPW United States Heavyweight Championship (1 time)
- Cauliflower Alley Club
  - Men's Wrestling Award (2019)
- Eastern Sports Association
  - NWA Canadian Heavyweight Championship (Halifax version) (2 times)
- Lutte Internationale
  - Canadian International Heavyweight Championship (1 time)
- NWA Mid-America
  - NWA Mid-America Tag Team Championship (1 time) – with Bill Ash
  - NWA Six-Man Tag Team Championship (1 time) – with Great Togo and Tojo Yamamoto
  - NWA Southern Tag Team Championship (1 time) – with Dennis Condrey
  - NWA World Brass Knuckles Championship (1 time)
- Southeastern Championship Wrestling
  - NWA Southeastern Heavyweight Championship (Northern Division) (1 time)
  - NWA Southeastern Heavyweight Championship (Southern Division) (1 time)
  - NWA Southeastern Tag Team Championship (1 time) – with Dennis Condrey
- Northeast Championship Wrestling
  - NCW Heavyweight Championship (1 time)
- Pro Wrestling Illustrated
  - Ranked No. 253 of the top 500 singles wrestlers of the PWI Years in 2003
- Stampede Wrestling
  - Stampede North American Heavyweight Championship (3 times)
  - Stampede Wrestling Hall of Fame (Class of 1995)
- Universal Wrestling Alliance
  - UWA Heavyweight Championship (1 time)
