= Eddie Marlin =

American professional wrestler (1930–2019)

Personal information
- Born: Edward Marlin; August 13, 1930 Nashville, Tennessee, U.S.
- Died: August 15, 2019 (aged 89) Hendersonville, Tennessee, U.S.
- Children: 2
- Family: Jeff Jarrett (grandson); Jerry Jarrett (son-in-law); Karen Jarrett (granddaughter-in-law)

Professional wrestling career
- Ring name(s): Eddie Marlin; Frankenstein; The Mummy
- Billed height: 6 ft 0 in (183 cm)
- Billed weight: 200 lb (91 kg)
- Trained by: Dick Dunn
- Debut: 1950s
- Retired: January 4, 1993

Edward Marlin (August 13, 1930 – August 15, 2019) was an American promoter and professional wrestler. He was the father-in-law of promoter and professional wrestler Jerry Jarrett and the grandfather of professional wrestler and promoter Jeff Jarrett.

== Professional wrestling career ==
In 1967, Marlin wrestled for Nick Gulas' NWA Mid-America promotion under a mask as "The Mummy". He formed a short-lived movie monster-themed tag team with Dr. Frank.

In the early-1970s, Marlin formed a tag team with Tommy Gilbert. The duo achieved their greatest success in NWA Mid-America, winning the NWA Southern Tag Team Championship, NWA World Six-Man Tag Team Championship, and NWA Mid-America Tag Team Championship.

In the mid-1970s, Gulas placed Marlin in a tag team with his son George in an attempt to help season him.

In 1977, Marlin's son-in-law Jerry Jarrett broke away from Gulas and formed his own rival promotion, the Memphis, Tennessee-based Continental Wrestling Association. Marlin began working with Jarrett, promoting and booking some CWA shows.

Marlin was the on-screen General Manager of Continental Wrestling Association throughout the 1980s. He was "hired" by CWA promoter Jerry Jarrett to run the company. He worked primarily as a good guy, often sticking up for the faces. He often butted heads with the "Head Booker" of CWA, Tom Renesto, who tended to favor the heels.

In early 1988, Marlin was involved in a feud with former tag team partner Tommy Gilbert that resulted in the former friends wrestling in a Cowboy Boot Match. It began when Gilbert's son, Doug, interrupted Marlin who was being interviewed by Lance Russell, and accused Marlin of showing favoritism towards Jerry Lawler. As Marlin argued against Doug Gilbert, Tommy Gilbert attacked him from behind. Then, the Gilberts proceeded to drag Marlin to the ring, where Tommy Gilbert busted Marlin open with a cowboy boot. In the following weeks, Marlin challenged his former partner to a Cowboy Boot Match, where the winner would be the first one to remove the opponent's cowboy boots. Eddie Marlin would go on to win that match, and defeat his former friend.

In 1989, Marlin portrayed "Frankenstein" in the CWA.

Marlin worked a few more years as General Manager after CWA was combined with WCCW to become USWA. He also continued to wrestle a few times in Dallas at the famous Sportatorium. His last match was held on January 4, 1993, teaming with Miss Texas in a loss to Bert Prentice & Leslie Belanger.

In 2001, Eddie Marlin took part in the “Clash of the Legends ” in Memphis that also had Jerry Lawler, Brian Christopher, Sputnik Monroe, Tracy Smothers, Tommy Rogers, Lord Humongous ( Emery Hale ), Jimmy Hart, The Moondogs, The Bushwhackers, and referee Jerry Calhoun.

== Death ==
On August 14, 2019 it was announced by his son-in-law Jerry Jarrett on Twitter that he would be moved to hospice care with multiple organ failure. Marlin died the next morning, just two days after turning 89 years old.

== Championships and accomplishments ==
- Memphis Wrestling Hall of Fame
  - Class of 2022
- NWA Mid-America
  - NWA Mid-America Tag Team Championship (3 times) - with Tommy Gilbert
  - NWA Southern Tag Team Championship (5 times) – with Tommy Gilbert (4) and Tojo Yamamoto (1)
  - NWA Tennessee Tag Team Championship (1 time) - with George Gulas
  - NWA World Six-Man Tag Team Championship (1 time) - with Tommy Gilbert and Ricky Gibson
  - NWA World Tag Team Championship (Mid-America version) (1 time) - with Jackie Fargo
  - NWA Southern Tag Team Championship Tournament (January 1975) - with Tojo Yamamoto

== Lucha de Apuestas record ==
Wager	Winner	Loser	Location	Date	Notes
Mask	Mummy	Blue Inferno #1	Chattanooga, Tennessee	November 9, 1967	
Hair	Eddie Marlin	Al Greene	Memphis, Tennessee	June 10, 1974	No disqualification
Hair	Eddie Marlin	Phil Hickerson	Memphis, Tennessee	July 1, 1974	Hickerson was the loser of the fall in a six-man tag team match of Marlin, Tommy Gilbert, and Ricky Gibson vs. Hickerson, Al Greene, and Sam Bass
Hair	Eric Embry	Eddie Marlin and Paul Neighbors	Memphis, Tennessee	July 15, 1991	Handicap match
