= NWA World Brass Knuckles Championship =

Professional wrestling championship

Details
- Promotion: NWA Mid-America, Southern Championship Wrestling (Tennessee)
- Date established: November 15, 1978
- Date retired: May 1982
Statistics
- First champion: Gypsy Joe
- Most reigns: Gypsy Joe (4 reigns)

The NWA World Brass Knuckles Championship was a short-lived title promoted by National Wrestling Alliance NWA Mid-America territory from 1978 until 1981. The championship was used in specialty matches in which the combatants would wear brass knuckles. There were other such championships used in a number of NWA territories throughout the United States of America, including versions in the Florida territory, Amarillo, New England, the Mid-Atlantic region and in NWA Tri-State. Because the championship was a professional wrestling championship, it was not won or lost competitively but instead by the decision of the bookers of a wrestling promotion. The championship was awarded after the chosen wrestler "won" a match to maintain the illusion that professional wrestling is a competitive sport.

== Title history ==
Key

Symbol	Meaning
#	The overall championship reign
Reign	The reign number for the specific set of wrestlers listed.
Event	The event promoted by the respective promotion in which the title changed hands
—	Used for vacated reigns in order to not count it as an official reign
	Indicates periods of unknown lineage

#	Wrestler	Reign	Date	Days held	Location	Event	Notes
1	Gypsy Joe	1	November 15, 1978	(Note: The date the championship was lost has not been documented which means the championship reign lasted anywhere between 1 day and 89 days.)	Nashville, Tennessee	Mid-America Live event	Defeated the Mexican Angel in a tournament final.
2	Don Fargo	1	February 12, 1979 (NLT)	(Note: The date the championship was won and lost has not been documented which means the championship reign lasted anywhere between 1 day and 133 days.)	(Note: The location of the match was not captured as part of the championship documentation.)	Mid-America Live event	Won Sometime after January 13, 1979.
3	Gypsy Joe	2	March 3, 1979 (NLT)	(Note: The date the championship was won and lost has not been documented which means the championship reign lasted anywhere between 1 day and 39 days.)		Mid-America Live event	
4	Don Fargo	2	March 25, 1979 (NLT)	(Note: The date the championship was won and lost has not been documented which means the championship reign lasted anywhere between 1 day and 179 days.)	Chattanooga, Tennessee	Mid-America Live event	Still billed as champions on May 26, 1979.
5	Gypsy Joe	3	August 1979 (NLT)	(Note: The date the championship was won has not been documented which means the championship reign lasted anywhere between 1 day and 142 days.)		Mid-America Live event	
6	Dennis Condrey	1	August 15, 1979	(Note: The date the championship was lost has not been documented which means the championship reign lasted anywhere between day and 3 days.)	Nashville, Tennessee	Mid-America Live event	
7	Gypsy Joe	4	August 1979	(Note: The date the championship was won has not been documented which means the championship reign lasted anywhere between 1 day and 3 days.)		Mid-America Live event	
8	David Schultz	1	August 18, 1979	(Note: The date the championship was lost has not been documented which means the championship reign lasted anywhere between 1 day and 407 days.)	Chattanooga, Tennessee	Mid-America Live event	
9	Don Fargo	3	September 29, 1980 (NLT)	(Note: The date the championship was abandoned has not been documented which means the championship reign lasted anywhere between 94 days and 458 days.)		Mid-America Live event	
—	Abandoned	N/A	1981	N/A	N/A	N/A	Championship Abandoned when the NWA Mid-America territory closed.
10	Steve Muslin	1	July 1981 (NLT)				
11	Rick Conners	1	July 17, 1981	35	Knoxville, Tennessee		
12	Ron Wright	1	August 21, 1981	14	Knoxville, Tennessee		
13	Rick Conners	2	September 1981 (NLT)		Knoxville, Tennessee		
14	Ron Wright	2	May 1982 (NLT)		Knoxville, Tennessee		
—	Title Retired	N/A	May 1982	N/A	N/A	N/A	

== See also ==
- National Wrestling Alliance
- NWA Brass Knuckles Championship (Florida version)
- NWA Brass Knuckles Championship (Amarillo version)
- NWA Brass Knuckles Championship (New England version)
- NWA Brass Knuckles Championship (Dallas version)
- NWA Brass Knuckles Championship (Mid-Atlantic version)
- NWA Brass Knuckles Championship (Tri-State version)
