= Tommy Gilbert =

American professional wrestler (1940–2015)

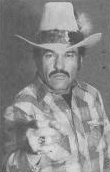

Personal information
- Born: Thomas Edward Gilbert; January 15, 1940 Lexington, Tennessee, U.S.
- Died: November 26, 2015 (aged 75) Lexington, Tennessee, U.S.
- Spouse: Peggy Gilbert
- Children: 3; including Eddie and Doug

Professional wrestling career
- Ring name(s): Tommy Gilbert; Freddy Krueger; Nightmare Freddy
- Trained by: Mario Galento
- Debut: 1969
- Retired: 1984 (as a wrestler); 1987 (as a referee)

Thomas Edward Gilbert Sr. (January 15, 1940 – November 26, 2015) was an American professional wrestler. He wrestled for Continental Wrestling Association and throughout the South as Tommy Gilbert. He was the father of wrestlers Doug Gilbert and Eddie Gilbert.

== Professional wrestling career ==
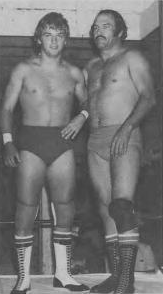
Tommy (right) and his son Eddie Gilbert, c. 1982

Tommy Gilbert made his debut in 1969, wrestling for promoter Nick Gulas. In March 1975, after wrestling primarily throughout Tennessee for nearly six years, he began going to other territories like Atlanta, Amarillo, the Canadian Maritimes, Florida, Kansas City, the Mid-South, Memphis, Puerto Rico, and the Mid-Atlantic areas.

== Retirement ==
After retiring from active competition in 1984, he became a referee for Mid-South/UWF, until its buyout by Jim Crockett Promotions in 1987.

Tommy Gilbert was inducted into the Memphis Wrestling Hall of Fame at a USWA show in the Mid-South Coliseum on March 7, 1994, alongside Al Greene, Don Greene, Jerry Jarrett, Lance Russell and Sputnik Monroe.

Tommy later wrestled in Memphis as Freddy Krueger in the late 1980s.

== Personal life ==
Gilbert was the father of two sons: Thomas Jr. and Doug Gilbert and a daughter Kim Gilbert Peters. The sons would become professional wrestlers as "Hot Stuff" Eddie Gilbert and "Dangerous" Doug Gilbert. Gilbert died on November 26, 2015, at the age of 75.

== Championships and accomplishments ==
- Cauliflower Alley Club
  - Family Award (2011) – with Eddie Gilbert and Doug Gilbert
- Championship Wrestling from Florida
  - NWA Florida Television Championship (1 time)
- Memphis Wrestling Hall of Fame
  - Class of 2017
- NWA Mid-America
  - NWA Southern Heavyweight Championship (1 time)
  - NWA Southern Junior Heavyweight Championship (4 times)
  - NWA Southern Tag Team Championship (7 times) – with Eddie Marlin (2), Bearcat Brown (2), Ricky Gibson (1), Eddie Gilbert (2)
  - NWA World Six-Man Tag Team Championship (2 times) - with Eddie Marlin and Ricky Gibson (1), Gorgeus George, Jr. and Paul Orndorff (1)
  - NWA Mid-America Tag Team Championship (2 times) - with Eddie Marlin (1) and Tojo Yamamoto (1)
- Eastern Sports Association
  - North American Heavyweight Championship (2 times)
- Gulf Coast Championship Wrestling/Southeastern Championship Wrestling
  - NWA Southeastern United States Junior Heavyweight Championship (2 times)
  - NWA Tennessee Tag Team Championship (4 times) - with Sputnik Monroe (2), Bearcat Brown (1) and Ron Wright (1)
- United States Wrestling Association
  - Memphis Wrestling Hall of Fame (Class of 1994)
- Western States Sports
  - NWA Western States Tag Team Championship (1 times) - with Scott Casey
- World Wrestling Council/Capitol Sports Promotions
  - WWC Caribbean Heavyweight Championship (1 time)
  - NWA North American Tag Team Championship (Puerto Rico/WWC version) (1 time) - with Eddie Gilbert (1)
