= NWA Tri-State Tag Team Championship (Alabama version) =

Professional wrestling tag team championship

Details
- Promotion: NWA Tri-State; NWA Mid-America
- Date established: October, 1971
- Date retired: 1977
Statistics
- First champions: Jerry Lawler and Steve Lawler
- Most reigns: Jerry and Steve Lawler, The Scufflin' Hillbillies, Tojo Yamamoto and George Gulas (2 reigns)

The Alabama version of the NWA Tri-State Tag Team Championship existed from 1971 until 1977. It was defended primarily in Alabama under the banner of NWA Tri-State Wrestling, and at times in Tennessee for NWA Mid-America. Because the championship was a professional wrestling championship, it is not won or lost competitively but instead by the decision of the bookers of a wrestling promotion. The championship was awarded after the chosen team "won" a match to maintain the illusion that professional wrestling is a competitive sport.

== Title history ==
Key
No.	Overall reign number
Reign	Reign number for the specific team—reign numbers for the individuals are in parentheses, if different
Days	Number of days held

No.	Champion	Championship change			Reign statistics		Notes	Ref.
No.	Champion	Date	Event	Location	Reign	Days	Notes	Ref.
1	Jerry Lawler and Steve Lawler	October 8, 1971 (NLT)	Tri-State show	(Note: The location of the match was not captured as part of the championship documentation.)	1	(Note: The date the championship was won and lost has not been documented which means the championship reign lasted anywhere between 1 day and 377 days.)		
2	The Scufflin' Hillbillies	January 13, 1972 (NLT)	Tri-State show		1	(Note: The date the championship was won has not been documented which means the championship reign lasted anywhere between −358 days and −262 days.)	Championship change took place at some point after November 19, 1971	
3	Jerry Lawler and Steve Lawler	January 20, 1972¤	Tri-State show	Anniston, Alabama¤	2	7		
4	The Scufflin' Hillbillies	January 27, 1972¤	Tri-State show	Anniston, Alabama¤	2	42		
5	Steve Lawler (3) and Burrhead Jones	March 9, 1972¤	Tri-State show	Anniston, Alabama¤	1	(Note: The date the championship was won and lost has not been documented which means the championship reign lasted anywhere between 1 day and 51 days.)		
Championship history is unrecorded from March 9, 1972¤ to April 29, 1972 (NLT).
6	Rip Tyler and Eddie Sullivan	April 29, 1972 (NLT)	Tri-State show		1	(Note: The date the championship was won and lost has not been documented which means the championship reign lasted anywhere between 1 day and 54 days.)	Still billed as champions on May 3, 1972	
Championship history is unrecorded from April 29, 1972 (NLT) to June 22, 1972 (NLT).
7	Jimmy Golden and Ramon Perez	June 22, 1972 (NLT)	Tri-State show		1	(Note: The date the championship was won has not been documented which means the championship reign lasted anywhere between 51 days and 105 days.)		
8	Buddy Wayne and Golden Hawk	August 12, 1972¤	Tri-State show	Anniston, Alabama¤	1	(Note: The date the championship was won and lost has not been documented which means the championship reign lasted anywhere between 1 day and 77 days.)		
Championship history is unrecorded from August 12, 1972¤ to October 28, 1972 (NLT).
9	The California Hippies	October 28, 1972 (NLT)	Tri-State show		1	(Note: The date the championship was won and lost has not been documented which means the championship reign lasted anywhere between 1 day and 154 days.)		
Championship history is unrecorded from October 28, 1972 (NLT) to March 1973 (NLT).
10	The Masked Blitzers (Masked Blitzer #1 and Masked Blitzer #2)	March 1973 (NLT)	Tri-State show		1	(Note: The date the championship was won and lost has not been documented which means the championship reign lasted anywhere between 1 day and 350 days.)		
Championship history is unrecorded from March 1973 (NLT) to February 14, 1974 (NLT).
11	Jack Donovan and Jim Williams	February 14, 1974 (NLT)	Tri-State show		1	(Note: The date the championship was won and lost has not been documented which means the championship reign lasted anywhere between 1 day and 42 days.)		
Championship history is unrecorded from February 14, 1974 (NLT) to March 28, 1974 (NLT).
12	Woodrow Bass and Steve Lawler (4)	March 28, 1974 (NLT)	Tri-State show		1	(Note: The date the championship was won and lost has not been documented which means the championship reign lasted anywhere between 1 day and 42 days.)	Still billed as champions on April 11, 1974	
Championship history is unrecorded from March 28, 1974 (NLT) to May 9, 1974 (NLT).
13	Jack Donovan (2) and Rick Renaldo	May 9, 1974 (NLT)	Tri-State show		1	(Note: The date the championship was won and lost has not been documented which means the championship reign lasted anywhere between 1 day and 56 days.)		
13.1	unrecorded	N/A	N/A	N/A				
14	Joe Turner and Dennis Condrey	July 4, 1974 (NLT)	Tri-State show		1	(Note: The date the championship was won and lost has not been documented which means the championship reign lasted anywhere between 1 day and 56 days.)	Still billed as champions on August 5, 1974	
Championship history is unrecorded from July 4, 1974 (NLT) to July 4, 1974.
15	Tojo Yamamoto and George Gulas	July 4, 1974	Tri-State show		1	(Note: The date the championship was won and lost has not been documented which means the championship reign lasted anywhere between 1 day and 1,031 days.)		
Championship history is unrecorded from July 4, 1974 to 1.
16	The Bounty Hunters (David Novak and Jerry Novak)	1		(Note: The date the championship was won and lost has not been documented which means the championship reign lasted anywhere between 1 day and 19 days.)	(David Novak and Jerry Novak)	April 1977 (NLT)	Tri-State show	
17	Tojo Yamamoto and George Gulas	April 20, 1977	Tri-State show	Nashville, Tennessee	2	(Note: The date the championship was won and lost has not been documented which means the championship reign lasted anywhere between 1 day and 255 days.)	The title change was May 2, 1977 in Memphis, Tennessee; Team still billed as champions on August 5, 1977	
—	Deactivated	1977	—	—	—	—		
