= Michael Porter (wrestling) =

American wrestling announcer (born 1951)

Personal information
- Born: January 14, 1951 Gridley, California, U.S.
- Died: October 23, 2010 (aged 59) Hollywood, California

Professional wrestling career
- Ring name: Michael Porter
- Billed height: 5 ft 10 in (1.78 m)
- Billed weight: 350 lb (160 kg)
- Debut: 1969 in San Francisco, California, U.S.

Michael Porter (born Kim Michael Porter; January 14, 1951 – October 23, 2010) was an American professional wrestling ring announcer and internet radio host.

Porter was born in Gridley, California, and began his career in 1969 in the San Francisco Bay Area and Sacramento region working under the guidance of legendary promoters Roy Shire, Louie Miller and Terry Garvin. Porter was best known for working as a house show ring announcer for the World Wrestling Federation (now World Wrestling Entertainment) from 1988 to 1993 (mostly on the west coast, including the historic Cow Palace in San Francisco, Oakland-Alameda County Coliseum Arena - now Oracle Arena - in Oakland and ARCO Arena - now Sleep Train Arena - in Sacramento). He worked security at WrestleMania VII at the Los Angeles Sports Arena in 1991.

He had announced for such independent feds such as the United Wrestling Alliance (Marysville, California) in 2002-2003, Pro Championship Wrestling (Oroville, California) in 2006 and Devil Mountain Wrestling (Martinez, California) in 2007-2008. Porter hosted a pro wrestling interview program Michael Porter's WrestleShoot, which started as a weekend radio show on Marysville, California, radio station KMYC-AM 1410 and aired there during 2004 and 2005. The show was later broadcast on the internet radio network, Blog Talk Radio. Porter interviewed varying levels of talent from independent stars to members of the WWE Hall of Fame. He also co-hosted the popular Cloverleaf Radio on the same channel.

Porter remained close friends with many WWE stars like Rowdy Roddy Piper, Koko B. Ware, Jimmy "Superfly" Snuka, Honky Tonk Man and Mean Gene Okerlund.

Porter died on October 23, 2010, at his home in Hollywood, California. He was suffering through various health problems from obesity to diabetes and was a two-time cancer survivor.

A few days following Porter's death, internet radio host Wacko Bob (Robert Guercia) & indy pro wrestler Rick Ryder would reunite with their old wrestling internet radio show The Dark Match on Blog Talk Radio and pay tribute to him with The Stro and Bill Apter as guests on the show.

== Michael Porter's WrestleShoot ==
On June 22, 2008, after co-hosting Cloverleaf Radio and The Dark Match for a number of months, and after a one-year stint on KMYC-AM radio in the 1990's, Porter relaunched his radio program Michael Porter's WrestleShoot on internet radio using the service Blog Talk Radio. He interviewed personalities from independent wrestlers to hall of famers and became a featured program on BTR until his death in 2010. On October 23, 2012, exactly two years after his death, Michael Porter's WrestleShoot returned to BTR with close friends Mike Summers (now of Siskiyou Broadcast Group of Mt. Shasta, California, and formerly of Action VR Network of Coconut Creek, Florida) and Paula Jo Schaber as hosts and producers. (Schaber has since died and "Wacko" Bob Guercia now serves as co-host and producer.) The program aired on Sundays on BTR and also spawned a spin-off program called RollerShoot, a program devoted to roller derby. On August 5, 2013, Michael Porter's WrestleShoot ended its five-year run with BTR with its final program by re-airing the pilot from 2008. The program returned to internet radio on its new home, The Wacko Radio Network (later Action VR Network), on December 4, 2016, airing on Mixlr. In 2017, repeats and marathons of the program began airing on Action VR 2 (now defunct). Summers, Guercia as The Star "Wacko Bob" (A Heel Persona), former wrestler "Pretty Boy" Doug Masters (from Portland Wrestling and World Wrestling Council) and former WWE Tough Enough participant Brian Danovich (until his passing) served as hosts until the last all-new episode aired on May 31, 2020. After two years of inactivity, both WrestleShoot and RollerShoot were finally cancelled by Action VR Network (now The Action Radio Zone).

== Career highlights ==
- World Wrestling Federation

- Ring Announcer/Security/Ring Crew (House shows and WrestleMania VII, 1988-1993)

- United Wrestling Alliance

- UWA Commissioner (2003)
- UWA Hardcore Champion (2003)

- Pro Championship Wrestling

- Ring Announcer (2005)

- Devil Mountain Wrestling

- Ring Announcer (2007)
