= George Grant (wrestler) =

American professional wrestler (1925–2010)

Personal information
- Born: Dan Sheffield; August 14, 1926 Honey Grove, Texas, U.S.
- Died: April 21, 2010 (aged 83) Columbia, South Carolina

Professional wrestling career
- Ring name(s): Gorgeous George; Gorgeous George Grant; Magnificent Grant; Gorgeous Dream Boy; Gorgeous Phillip; Danny McKay; Danny Sheffield
- Billed height: 5 ft 9 in (1.75 m)
- Billed weight: 220 lb (100 kg)
- Debut: 1945
- Retired: 1971

Dan Moody Sheffield (August 14, 1926 – April 21, 2010), better known by the ring name George Grant was an American professional wrestler and Evangelical preacher.

== Career ==
Sheffield began wrestling during the 1940s, and was best known for using the "Gorgeous George" gimmick, made popular by George Wagner. A creation of promoter Jack Pfefer, he has often been accused of being a copycat of Wagner's gimmick.

Following his retirement from professional wrestling, he became an evangelical preacher.

== Luchas de Apuestas record ==
Winner (wager)	Loser (wager)	Location	Event	Date	Notes
Gypsy Joe (ringlets)	George Grant (hair)	Estevan, Saskatchewan	Live event	July 16, 1960	
