= NWA Mid-America Tag Team Championship =

Professional wrestling tag team championship

- An early version of the championship belt

Details
- Promotion: NWA Mid-America (1972–1981); NWA Nashville (2001–2011)
- Date established: 1972
- Date retired: 2011
Statistics
- First champions: The Interns (Intern I and Intern II)
- Most reigns: As a team: The Interns (Intern I and Intern II) (6 reigns); As individual: Tojo Yamamoto (13 reigns)
- Longest reign: Jeff Daniels and Steve O (826 days)
- Shortest reign: Jeff Daniels and Lonestar (<1 day)

The NWA Mid-America Tag Team championship was a tag team title promoted by the American professional wrestling promotion NWA Mid-America that ran more or less exclusively in Alabama, Tennessee, and Kentucky, United States, from the 1940s until 1980. Originally the NWA Mid-America promoted their version of the NWA World Tag-Team titles but when they became defunct in 1977 the "Mid-America" title became the main title for the promotion. The titles were reactivated in 2001 under NWA Nashville's patronage and continued to exist until 2011 when they were again abandoned.

== Title history ==
Key
No.	Overall reign number
Reign	Reign number for the specific team—reign numbers for the individuals are in parentheses, if different
Days	Number of days held
<1	Reign lasted less than a day
+	Current reign is changing daily

No.	Champion	Championship change			Reign statistics		Notes	Ref.
No.	Champion	Date	Event	Location	Reign	Days	Notes	Ref.
1	The Interns (Intern I and Intern II)	1972	House show	N/A	1	N/A	The Interns were billed as the inaugural champions under unknown cicrumstances. The exact length of the reign is uncertain.[1]	
2	Len Rossi and Tony Charles	1972	House show	N/A	1	N/A	The exact length of the reign is uncertain.	
3	The Von Brauners (Kurt Von Brauner and Karl Von Brauner)	April 8, 1972	House show	Chattanooga, TN	1	21		
4	Len Rossi and Tony Charles	April 29, 1972	House show	Chattanooga, TN	2	N/A		
5	The Von Brauners (Kurt Von Brauner and Karl Von Brauner)	May 1972	House show	N/A	2	N/A		
6	The Heavenly Bodies (Don Greene and Al Greene)	May 1972	House show	N/A	1	N/A		
7	Len Rossi (3) and Bearcat Brown	July 1, 1972	House show	Chattanooga, TN	1	N/A	The exact length of the reign is uncertain due to the championship's history not being properly recorded in July 1972.	
8	Great Fuji and Steve Kyle	July 1972	House show	N/A	1	N/A	The exact length of the reign is uncertain due to the championship's history not being properly recorded in July 1972.	
9	The Interns (Intern I and Intern II)	July 1972	House show	N/A	2	N/A	The Interns were also known as Tom Andrews and Jim Starr.	
10	Tojo Yamamoto and Bill Dromo	August 8, 1972	House show	Birmingham, AL	1	6		
11	The Interns (Intern I and Intern II)	August 14, 1972	House show	Birmingham, AL	3	7		
12	Tojo Yamamoto and Bill Dromo	August 21, 1972	House show	Birmingham, AL	2	7		
13	The Interns (Intern I and Intern II)	August 28, 1972	House show	Birmingham, AL	4	N/A		
14	The Continental Warriors (Bobby Hart and Lorenzo Parente)	August–November, 1972	House show	N/A	1	N/A		
—	Vacated	November 1972 (NLT)	N/A	N/A	—	—	The titles were vacated under unknown circumstances.	
15	The Continental Warriors (Bobby Hart and Lorenzo Parente)	November 11, 1972	House show	Nashville, TN	2	0-20	Defeat Jim White and Jerry Lawler in tournament final to win the vacant titles.	
16	Ken Luchas and Frankie Laine	November 1972	House show	Birmingham, AL	1	N/A		
17	The Continental Warriors (Bobby Hart and Lorenzo Parente)	December 1972	House show	N/A	3	N/A		
18	Tojo Yamamoto and Bill Dromo	December 1972	House show	N/A	3	N/A		
19	The Continental Warriors (Bobby Hart and Lorenzo Parente)	January 1973	House show	N/A	4	N/A		
20	Tommy Gilbert and Eddie Marlin	March 14, 1973	House show	Nashville, TN	1	0-17		
21	The Continental Warriors (Bobby Hart and Lorenzo Parente)	March 1973	House show	N/A	5	0-29		
22	Tommy Gilbert and Eddie Marlin	March 29, 1973	House show	Chattanooga, TN	2	32		
23	Terry Garvin and Duke Myers	April 30, 1973	House show	Birmingham, AL	1	N/A		
24	Tommy Gilbert and Eddie Marlin	May 1973	House show	N/A	3	N/A		
25	Terry Garvin and Duke Myers	May 9, 1973	House show	Nashville, TN	2	28		
26	Bearcat Brown (2) and Joey Rossi	June 6, 1973	House show	Nashville, TN	1	N/A		
27	Terry Garvin and Duke Myers	June 1973	House show	N/A	3	N/A		
28	Tojo Yamamoto (3) and Jackie Fargo	July 2, 1973	House show	Birmingham, AL	1	N/A		
29	The Garvin Brothers (Ronnie Garvin and Terry Garvin (4))	July–August, 1973	House show	N/A	1	N/A		
30	Joey Rossi and Don Greene	August 4, 1973	House show	Chattanooga, TN	1	N/A		
31	Terry Garvin and Duke Myers	August 4–8, 1973	House show	N/A	4	0-4		
32	Tojo Yamamoto (4) and Johnny Marlin	August 8, 1973	House show	Nashville, TN	1	28		
33	The Garvin Brothers (Ronnie Garvin and Terry Garvin (5))	September 5, 1973	House show	Nashville, TN	2	N/A		
34	Tojo Yamamoto (5) and Jackie Fargo	September–December 5, 1973	House show	Nashville, TN	2	N/A		
35	The Interns (Intern I and Intern II)	December 5, 1973	House show	Chattanooga, TN	5	24		
36	Bearcat Brown (3) and Don Greene (2)	December 29, 1973	House show	Chattanooga, TN	1	14		
37	The Interns (Intern I and Intern II)	January 12, 1974	House show	Chattanooga, TN	6	N/A		
38	Lorenzo Parente (6) and Bill Dromo (3)	January–February, 1974	House show	N/A	1	N/A		
39	Frank Morrell and Charles Morrell	February 20, 1974	House show	Nashville, TN	1	N/A		
40	Frank Monte and Nick DeCarlo	March, 1974	House show	N/A	1	N/A		
41	Don Kent and Chris Gallagher	March, 1974	House show	N/A	1	N/A		
42	Steve Kovacs and Ricky Gibson	August 24, 1974	House show	Chattanooga, TN	1	7		
43	Don Kent and Chris Gallagher	August 31, 1974	House show	Chattanooga, TN	2	30		
44	Duke Myers and Blue Scorpion	September 30, 1974	House show	Birmingham, AL	1	N/A	Ricky Fields and Johnny Fields replaced Don Kent and Gallagher into the title defense.	
45	Jackie Fargo (3) and George Gulas	October 1974	House show	N/A	1	N/A		
46	Don Kent (3) and Count Drummer	November 6, 1974	House show	Nashville, TN	1	14		
47	Jackie Fargo (4) and George Gulas	November 20, 1974	House show	Nashville, TN	2	42		
48	The Masked Godfathers (Masked Godfather I and Masked Godfather II)	January 1, 1975	House show	Nashville, TN	1	7	The Masked Godfathers were also known as Rocket Monroe and Randy Tyler.	
49	Jackie Fargo (5) and George Gulas	January 8, 1975	House show	Nashville, TN	3	N/A		
50	The Bicenntenial Kings (Dennis Condrey and Phil Hickerson)	1975 or 1976	House show	N/A	1	N/A	The exact length of the title reign is uncertain due to the history of the championship not being properly recorded from May 26, 1975 to November 1976. Cagematch.de states that this reign existed until 1976, but other sources say it doesn't, so it is currently unknown if the title change was sanctioned or not due to contradiction of several sources.	
51	Karl Von Steiger and Otto Von Heller	May 26, 1975	House show	N/A	1	N/A	The exact length of the title reign is uncertain due to the history of the championship not being properly recorded from May 26, 1975 to November 1976.	
52	Bill Ash and David Schultz	November 1976	House show	N/A	1	N/A		
53	George Gulas (4) and Gorgeous George Jr.	November 1976	House show	N/A	1	N/A		
54	The Bicenntenial Kings (Dennis Condrey and Phil Hickerson)	November 1976	House show	N/A	2	N/A		
55	Ricky Gibson and Bill Dundee	December 26, 1976	House show	Chattanooga, TN	1	7	The Executioner replaced Hickerson in the title defense.	
56	The Samoans (Tio and Tapu)	January 2, 1977	NWA Mid-America	Nashville, TN	1	31		
—	Vacated	February 2, 1977	—	—	—	—	The titles were vacated under unknown circumstances.	
57	Ken Lucas and Tommy Rich	February 9, 1977	NWA Mid-America	Nashville, TN	1	7		
58	The Samoans (Tio and Tapu)	February 16, 1977	NWA Mid-America	Nashville, TN	2	98		
59	Ken Lucas (2) and Ray Candy	June 1977	House show	Nashville, TN	1	N/A		
60	Pez Whatley and Ray Candy (2)	June 1977	House show	Nashville, TN	1	N/A	It is currently unknown how Whatley became Ray Candy's partner.	
61	The Samoans (Tio and Tapu)	July 16, 1977	House show	Chattanooga, TN	3	21		
62	Pez Whatley (2) and Ray Candy (3)	August 6, 1977	House show	Chattanooga, TN	2	N/A		
—	Vacated	August 1977	—	—	—	—	The titles were vacated after Ray Candy left the promotion.	
63	George Gulas (5) and Tojo Yamamoto (7)	August 24, 1977	NWA Mid-America	Nashville, TN	1	N/A	George Gulas and Tojo Yamamoto defeated Angelo Poffo and Lanny Poffo and The Samoans (Tio and Tapu) in a 3-team tournament to win the vacant titles.	
—	Vacated	December 1977	—	—	—	—	The titles were vacated after George Gulas was sidelined with an injury.	
64	Gypsy Joe and Leroy Rochester	December 12, 1977	House show	Nashville, TN	1	20	Won a tournament for the vacant titles.	
65	Lanny Poffo and Bobby Eaton/Pez Whatley (3)	January 14, 1978	House show	Birmingham, AL	1	N/A	Sources contradict upon either Bobby Eaton or Pez Whatley's apartenence of this reign.	
66	Gypsy Joe (2) and Dutch Mantell	January–February 1978	House show	Nashville, TN	1	N/A		
67	Gypsy Joe (3) and Buzz Tyler	February 22, 1978	House show	N/A	1	7	Dutch Mantell gave up his half of the title, leaving Buzz Tyler to defnd alongside Gypsy Joe, however, it was not recognized as an uninterrupted reign.	
68	George Gulas (6) and Tojo Yamamoto (8)	March 1, 1978	House show	Nashville, TN	2	N/A		
—	Vacated	August 1978	—	—	—	—	The titles were vacated after George Gulas and Tojo Yamamoto split up as a tag team.	
69	Ken Lucas (2) and Dutch Mantell (2)	August 12, 1978	NWA Mid-America	Chattanooga, TN	1	N/A	Won a tournament for the vacant titles.	
70	Gypsy Joe (4) and Tojo Yamamoto (9)	September 1978	House show	Chattanooga, TN	1	N/A		
71	Ken Lucas (3) and Dutch Mantell (3)	October 8, 1978	NWA Mid-America	Chattanooga, TN	2	N/A	This was a Title vs. hair match	
72	Gypsy Joe (5) and Tojo Yamamoto (10)	October–December 1978	House show	N/A	2	N/A		
73	The Jet Set (George Gulas (7) and Bobby Eaton (2))	October–December 1978	House show	N/A	1	N/A		
74	The Fabulous Freebirds (Michael Hayes and Terry Gordy)	January 7, 1979	NWA Mid-America	Chattanooga, TN	1	178		
75	Gypsy Joe (6) and Tom Renesto Jr.	July 4, 1979	House show	Nashville, TN	1	21		
76	Tojo Yamamoto (11) and Great Togo	July 25, 1979	NWA Mid-America	Nashville, TN	1	N/A		
—	Vacated	August 1978	—	—	—	—	The titles were vacated under unknown circumstances.	
77	The Jet Set (George Gulas (8) and Bobby Eaton (3))	September 8, 1979	NWA Mid-America	Chattanooga, TN	2	N/A		
—	Vacated	September–December 1979	—	—	—	—	The titles were vacated after George Gulas and Bobby Eaton split up as a tag team.	
78	Jim Dalton and Butch Malone	December 1, 1979	NWA Mid-America	Chattanooga, TN	1	7	Defeated George Gulas and Ken Lucas in a tournament final to win the vacant titles.	
79	George Gulas (9) and Ken Lucas (3)	December 8, 1979	NWA Mid-America	Chattanooga, TN	1	7		
80	The Blond Bombers (Larry Latham and Wayne Farris)	December 15, 1979	NWA Mid-America	Chattanooga, TN	1	43		
81	The Jet Set (George Gulas (9) and Bobby Eaton (4))	January 27, 1980	House show	Chattanooga, TN	3	30		
82	The Blond Bombers (Larry Latham and Wayne Farris)	February 26, 1980	House show	Chattanooga, TN	2	8		
83	Rocky Brewer and Pat Rose	March 5, 1980	House show	Nashville, TN	1	14		
84	Tojo Yamamoto (12) and Gypsy Joe (7)	March 19, 1980	House show	Nashville, TN	1	N/A		
85	George Gulas (10) and Rocky Brewer (2)	March–May, 1980	House show	N/A	1	N/A		
86	Tojo Yamamoto (13) and Gypsy Joe (8)	May, 1980	House show	N/A	2	N/A		
87	George Gulas (11) and Rocky Brewer (3)	May 28, 1980	House show	Nashville, TN	2	N/A		
88	Bobby Eaton (5) and Great Togo (2)	June 1980	House show	N/A	1	N/A		
89	The Blond Bombers (Larry Latham and Wayne Farris)	July 1980	House show	N/A	3	N/A		
90	Don Fargo and Robert Gibson	September 3, 1980	House show	Nashville, TN	1	10		
91	The Manchurrians (Tio and Tapu)	September 13, 1980	House show	Chattanooga, TN	4	N/A	Previously known as The Samoans.	
92	Ken Luchas (4) and Ricky Morton	September 1980	House show	N/A	1	N/A		
—	Deactivated	October 1980	—	—	—	—	The titles were abandoned after Nick Gulas' promotion closes.	
93	Sweet N Sassy (Farron Foxx and Quinton Charisma)	February 17, 2001	House show	Nashville, TN	1	11	Foxx and Charisma fought in a four-way tag team match also involving Ashley Hudson and Kory Williams, Chris Daniels and Tim Renesto, and Shane Eden and Lance Dreamer to win the re-activated titles.	
94	Jeff Daniels and Tim Renesto	March 10, 2001	House show	Nashville, TN	1	56		
95	Ashley Hudson and Tim Renesto (2)	May 5, 2001	House show	Nashville, TN	1	27	The match between Jeff Daniels and Tim Renesto and New South ended with Hudson pinning Daniels and Renesto pinning Kory Williams at the same time. NWA Nashville promoter Mike Porter rules that Hudson and Renesto were the new champions.	
96	Jeff Daniels (2) and Tim Renesto (3)	June 1, 2001	N/A	Nashville, TN	2	29	Hudson's and Renesto's win decision was reversed, therefore Daniels was reinstated champion. The previous reign continued being recognized. Daniels and Renestobegan being listed as champions on the NWA Main Event official website as of June 1, 2001.	
97	Sudden Impact (Chris Gatlin and Steve Lane)	June 30, 2001	House show	Columbia, TN	1	35	This was a three-way tag team match also involving Victory Twins (Lee Victory and Lex Victory).	
—	Vacated	August 4, 2001	—	—	—	—	Titles were held up under unknown circumstances.	
98	Sudden Impact (Chris Gatlin and Steve Lane)	August 18, 2001	House show	Columbia, TN	2	28		
—	Vacated	September 15, 2001	—	—	—	—	Titles were held up under unknown circumstances.	
99	Sudden Impact (Chris Gatlin and Steve Lane)	September 22, 2001	House show	LaVergne, TN	3	36	Defeated Disturbing Behavior (Jeff Daniels and Tim Renesto) and The Bullies in a three-way tag team match to win the vacant titles.	
100	Disturbing Behaviour (Jeff Daniels (3) and Tim Renesto (4))	October 28, 2001	House show	Columbia, TN	3	216		
101	John Noble and Robbie Ruffin	June 1, 2002	House show	Columbia, TN	1	56		
102	Dante and Leatherface	July 27, 2002	House show	Columbia, TN	1	35		
103	Andy Douglas and Ricky Santell	August 31, 2002	House show	Columbia, TN	1	161		
104	The Heartbreakers (John Caesar and Larry Valentine)	February 8, 2003	House show	Columbia, TN	1	21		
105	Dante (2) and Tim Renesto (5)	March 1, 2003	House show	Columbia, TN	1	27		
106	The Heartbreakers (John Caesar and Larry Valentine)	March 28, 2003	NWA Main Event	Columbia, TN	2	100		
107	Justin Sane and Natas	July 6, 2003	House show	Murfreesboro, TN	1	20		
108	Jeff Daniels (4) and Lonestar	July 26, 2003	House show	Columbia, TN	1	<1		
109	Kory Williams and Mike Woods	July 26, 2003	House show	Columbia, TN	1	29		
110	Bryan Turner and Dan Morrow	August 24, 2003	House show	Murfreesboro, TN	1	70		
111	Devil's Disciples (Damien and Dante (2))	November 2, 2003	House show	Murfreesboro, TN	1	25		
112	Kory Williams (2) and Kid Thrilla	November 27, 2003	House show	Lewisburg, TN	1	N/A		
113	Devil's Disciples (Damien and Dante (3))	December 2003	House show	Tennessee	2	N/A		
114	Bryan Turner and Dan Morrow	December 25, 2003	House show	Columbia, TN	2	9		
—	Vacated	January 3, 2004	—	—	—	—	Turner and Morrow were stripped off the titles due to not being able to defend them for more than two weeks.	
115	Dante (3) and Mephisto II	January 3, 2004	House show	Columbia, TN	1	61	Defeated Sudden Impact (Steve Lane and Chris Gatlin) to win the vacant titles.	
116	Kory Williams (3) and Kid Thrilla	March 4, 2004	House show	Springfield, TN	2	100	Big Bully Douglas replaced Mephisto II in the title defense.	
117	Rex Sexton and Tommy Capone	June 12, 2004	House show	Columbia, TN	1	N/A		
—	Vacated	June 2005	—	—	—	—	The titles were vacated somewhere in June 2005 unde unknown cirsumstances.	
118	Jeff Daniels (5) and Mike Woods	October 8, 2005	NWA 57th Anniversary Show & Convention	Columbia, TN	1	301	Defeated The Old School Players (Apollo and Dynamite Derrick) to win the vacant titles.	
119	The Syndicate Crew (Karnage and LA Player)	August 5, 2006	NWA Main Event	Columbia, TN	1	76	This was a three-way tag team match also involving an unknown team.	
120	Jody Lopez and Rick Thunder	October 20, 2006	House show	Smyrna, TN	1	1		
121	The Syndicate Crew (LA Player (2) and Psycho Medic)	October 21, 2006	House show	Columbia, TN	1	33		
122	Brandon Stone and Johnny Gunnz	November 23, 2006	House show	Columbia, TN	1	2		
123	The Syndicate Crew (LA Player (3) and D'Angelo)	November 25, 2006	House show	Columbia, TN	1	140		
—	Vacated	April 14, 2007	NWA Main Event	—	—	—	LA Player and D'Angelo were stripped off the titles due to an illegal interference of the other members of The Syndicate Crew in a match against Johnny Demento and Slade.	
124	Jeff Daniels (6) and Steve O	March 7, 2009	NWA Main Event	Princeton, KY	1	826	Defeated Chris Hayes and Scott Hayes to win the vacant titles.	
—	Deactivated	June 11, 2011	—	—	—	—	The titles were vacated somewhere before June 11, 2011 and later abandoned.	

=== Combined reigns ===
†	Indicates the current champion
¤	The exact length of at least one title reign is uncertain, so the shortest length is considered.

Rank	Team	No. of reigns	Combined days
1	Jeff Daniels and Steve Olsonoski	1	826
2	Disturbing Behaviour (Jeff Daniels and Tim Renesto)	3	301
2	Jeff Daniels and Mike Woods	1	301
4	The Fabulous Freebirds (Michael Hayes and Terry Gordy)	1	178
5	Andy Douglas and Ricky Santell	1	161
6	The Samoans/The Manchurrians (Tio and Tapu)	4	150
7	The Syndicate Crew (LA Player and D'Angelo)	1	140
8	The Heartbreakers (John Caesar and Larry Valentine)	2	121
9	Kory Williams and Kid Thrilla	2	¤100
10	Sudden Impact (Chris Gatlin and Steve Lane)	3	99
11	Bryan Turner and Dan Morrow	2	79
12	The Syndicate Crew (Karnage and LA Player)	1	76
13	Dante and Mephisto II	1	61
14	John Noble and Robbie Ruffin	1	56
15	The Blond Bombers (Larry Latham and Wayne Farris)	3	¤51
16	Jackie Fargo and George Gulas	3	¤42
17	Dante and Leatherface	1	35
18	The Syndicate Crew (LA Player and Psycho Medic)	1	33
19	Tommy Gilbert and Eddie Marlin	3	¤32-49
20	The Interns (Intern I and Intern II)	6	31
21	Don Kent and Chris Gallagher	2	¤30
21	The Jet Set (George Gulas and Bobby Eaton)	3	¤30
23	Kory Williams and Mike Woods	1	29
24	Tojo Yamamoto and Johnny Marlin	1	28
25	Ashley Hudson and Tim Renesto	1	27
25	Dante and Tim Renesto	1	27
27	Devil's Disciples (Damien and Dante)	2	¤25
28	Gypsy Joe and Tom Renesto Jr.	1	21
28	The Von Brauners (Kurt Von Brauner and Karl Von Brauner)	2	¤21
30	Gypsy Joe and Leroy Rochester	1	20
30	Justin Sane and Natas	1	20
32	Bearcat Brown and Don Greene	1	14
32	Don Kent and Count Drummer	1	14
32	Rocky Brewer and Pat Rose	1	14
35	Tojo Yamamoto and Bill Dromo	3	¤13
36	Sweet N Sassy (Farron Foxx and Quinton Charisma)	1	11
37	Don Fargo and Robert Gibson	1	10
38	George Gulas and Ken Lucas	1	7
38	Gypsy Joe and Buzz Tyler	1	7
38	Jim Dalton and Butch Malone	1	7
38	Ken Lucas and Tommy Rich	1	7
38	Ricky Gibson and Bill Dundee	1	7
38	Steve Kovacs and Ricky Gibson	1	7
38	The Masked Godfathers (Masked Godfather I and Masked Godfather II)	1	7
45	Brandon Stone and Johnny Gunnz	1	2
46	Jody Lopez and Rick Thunder	1	1
47	The Continental Warriors (Bobby Hart and Lorenzo Parente)	5	¤0-49
48	Tommy Gilbert and Eddie Marlin	1	¤0-17
49	Jeff Daniels and Lonestar	1	<1
50	Terry Garvin and Duke Myers	4	¤N/A
50	George Gulas and Rocky Brewer	2	¤N/A
50	George Gulas and Tojo Yamamoto	2	¤N/A
50	Gypsy Joe and Tojo Yamamoto	2	¤N/A
50	Ken Lucas and Dutch Mantell	2	¤N/A
50	Len Rossi and Tony Charles	2	¤N/A
50	Pez Whatley and Ray Candy	2	¤N/A
50	The Bicenntenial Kings (Dennis Condrey and Phil Hickerson)	2	¤N/A
50	The Garvin Brothers (Ronnie Garvin and Terry Garvin)	2	¤N/A
50	Tojo Yamamoto and Gypsy Joe	2	¤N/A
50	Tojo Yamamoto and Jackie Fargo	2	¤N/A
50	Bearcat Brown and Joey Rossi	1	¤N/A
50	Bill Ash and David Schultz	1	¤N/A
50	Bobby Eaton and Great Togo	1	¤N/A
50	Duke Myers and Blue Scorpion	1	¤N/A
50	Frank Monte and Nick DeCarlo	1	¤N/A
50	Frank Morrell and Charles Morrell	1	¤N/A
50	George Gulas and Gorgeous George Jr.	1	¤N/A
50	Great Fuji and Steve Kyle	1	¤N/A
50	Gypsy Joe and Dutch Mantell	1	¤N/A
50	Joey Rossi and Don Greene	1	¤N/A
50	Karl Von Steiger and Otto Von Heller	1	¤N/A
50	Ken Luchas and Frankie Laine	1	¤N/A
50	Ken Lucas and Ray Candy	1	¤N/A
50	Ken Luchas and Ricky Morton	1	¤N/A
50	Lanny Poffo and Bobby Eaton/Pez Whatley	1	¤N/A
50	Len Rossi and Bearcat Brown	1	¤N/A
50	Lorenzo Parente and Bill Dromo	1	¤N/A
50	Rex Sexton and Tommy Capone	1	¤N/A
50	The Heavenly Bodies (Don Greene and Al Greene)	1	¤N/A
50	Tojo Yamamoto and Great Togo	1	¤N/A

== Notes ==
[1] – Unless otherwise noted than N/A the length of the reign in uncertain or unrecorded.
