= NWA Canadian Heavyweight Championship (Halifax version) =

Professional wrestling championship

The Halifax version of the NWA Canadian Heavyweight Championship was first defended in the Eastern Sports Association only in 1977, the year the promotion closed. The title was imported from George Cannon's 'Canadian Wrestling' based in Ontario.

In late 2012, Atlantic Canadian Championship Wrestling and the National Wrestling Alliance formed a partnership to create NWA Atlantic Canada. The NWA Canadian Heavyweight Championship (Halifax/Maritimes) will be used as the company's top championship. An eight-man tournament was held beginning in March 2013 to crown the first NWA Canadian Heavyweight Champion (Halifax/Maritimes) since 1977. On April 5, 2013, JB Havoc won the NWA Canadian Heavyweight title in a record setting 29 seconds, which is credited with being the quickest title match in the history of the National Wrestling Alliance.

== History ==
Key
No.	Overall reign number
Reign	Reign number for the specific team—reign numbers for the individuals are in parentheses, if different
Days	Number of days held

No.	Champion	Championship change			Reign statistics		Notes	Ref.
No.	Champion	Date	Event	Location	Reign	Days	Notes	Ref.
1	Luis Martinez	April 30, 1977 (NLT)	ESA show	N/A	1	N/A	Arrived as champion (Ontario?)	
2	Sailor White	May 18, 1977	ESA show	Halifax, NS	1	31		
3	Stonewall Jackson	June 18, 1977	ESA show	New Glasgow, NS	1	28		
4	Don Fargo	July 16, 1977	ESA show	New Glasgow, NS	1	11		
5	Terry Sawyer	July 27, 1977	ESA show	Halifax, NS	1	13		
6	David Schultz	August 9, 1977	ESA show	Halifax, NS	1	1		
7	Terry Sawyer	August 10, 1977	ESA show	Halifax, NS	2	3		
8	David Schultz	August 13, 1977	ESA show	New Glasgow, NS	2	N/A		
—	Deactivated	1977	—	N/A	—	—	Promotion closed	
9	JB Havoc	April 5, 2013	ESA show	Spryfield, NS	1	N/A	Defeats Jaxon Furey in tournament final when the title is revived by NWA Atlantic Canada	
