= Steve Travis (wrestler) =

American professional wrestler (1950–2018)

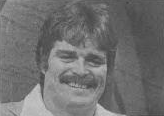

Personal information
- Born: Steve Al Musulin; December 13, 1950 Charlottesville, Virginia, United States
- Died: August 10, 2018 (aged 67) Richmond, Virginia, United States
- Education: Guilford College

Professional wrestling career
- Ring name(s): Steve Travis; Steve Muslin; Stonewall Jackson; Steve Valiant
- Billed height: 6 ft 2 in (188 cm)
- Billed weight: 229 lb (104 kg)
- Debut: 1976
- Retired: 1985

Steve Al Musulin (December 13, 1950 – August 10, 2018) was an American professional wrestler and artist. He worked for the World Wrestling Federation and Mid-Atlantic Championship Wrestling in the late 1970s and early 1980s under the ring name Steve Travis.

== Professional wrestling career ==
Musulin attended Guilford College in Greensboro, North Carolina where he played football. After graduating from college, he began wrestling in 1976. He wrestled as Stonewall Jackson in Tennessee, Ohio and the Canadian Maritimes before making his debut in the World Wrestling Federation in 1978. In 1979, he was known as "The Rookie of the Year" where he feuded with Johnny Rodz and the Valiant Brothers. He left the WWF in late 1979.

From 1980 to 1981 he worked in Japan, Toronto and Mid-Atlantic (AKA Jim Crockett Promotions).

Then he returned to the WWF in 1981, teaming with Rick McGraw as the Carolina Connection. Travis also teamed with Andre the Giant in a couple of matches. The notable one was when Travis and Andre defeated Mr. Fuji and Mr. Saito by disqualification at the Boston Garden. He left the WWF later that year.

After leaving the WWF, he returned to Mid-Atlantic. One day in 1984, Travis was driving in Georgia while high on several drugs. Travis wound up crashing his vehicle into another car, killing that driver instantly.

Travis was severely injured from the crash and was paralyzed as a result. After a year of rehabilitation, Travis was able to walk again and was immediately arrested and charged with vehicular manslaughter. He was sentenced to 10 months in a Georgia penitentiary. He was eventually released and became a sculptor.

== Death ==
On August 10, 2018, Musulin died at the age of 67.

== Championships and accomplishments ==
- Eastern Sports Association
  - NWA Canadian Heavyweight Championship (1 time)
- Georgia Championship Wrestling
  - NWA Georgia Television Championship (1 time)
- NWA Mid-America / Continental Wrestling Association
  - NWA Mid-America Heavyweight Championship (1 time)
