= Jackie Fargo =

American professional wrestler (1930–2013)

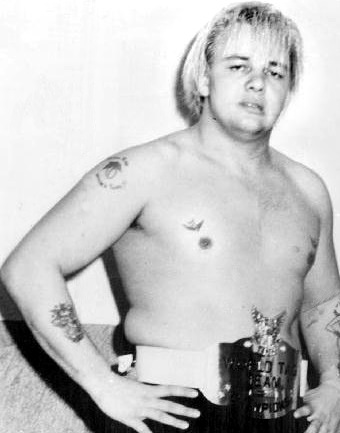
- Fargo in 1961

Personal information
- Born: Henry Faggart; June 26, 1930 Concord, North Carolina, U.S.
- Died: June 24, 2013 (aged 82) China Grove, North Carolina, U.S.
- Cause of death: Heart failure
- Children: 3
- Family: Sonny Fargo (brother)

Professional wrestling career
- Ring name(s): Honey Boy Fargo; Jackie Fargo; Wildman Fargo
- Billed height: 5 ft 10 in (1.78 m)
- Billed weight: 250 Ib (113 kg)
- Debut: 1950
- Retired: 2006

Henry Faggart (June 26, 1930 – June 24, 2013) was an American professional wrestler, better known by his ring name Jackie Fargo. He competed in Southeastern regional promotions and the National Wrestling Alliance during the 1950s, 1960s and 1970s.

A mainstay of NWA Mid-America (later the Continental Wrestling Association), he served as a mentor to Jerry "The King" Lawler and The Fabulous Ones, among other wrestlers in the Memphis area. He was known for his blonde hair and "Fargo Strut" mannerism, having held 45 tag team championships throughout his career, with the likes of Don Fargo, Sonny "Roughhouse" Fargo, amongst others.

== Professional wrestling career ==
Fargo's first experience with wrestling was as a teenager at the YMCA in Goldsboro, North Carolina; after he took part in the state championships, a local promoter suggested that Fargo could earn more money by switching to professional wrestling. Fargo was trained at the Quonset Auditorium in Bowling Green, Kentucky by Joe and Kenny Marshall, and first wrestled under the name "Wild Man Fargo".

Fargo started his professional wrestling career around 1950 for Johnny Long in Atlanta. In 1952, Fargo wrestled in Cuba before serving in the Korean War. Fargo was a very successful tag team wrestler, having held tag team championships 45 times throughout his career. He formed a famous tag team with Don Fargo (real name Don Kalt) as the Fabulous Fargos; together they won the NWA World Tag Team titles in 1958 and dominated the National Wrestling Alliance during the late 1950s. Jackie and Don Fargo's match against Antonino Rocca and Miguel Pérez was witnessed by a record-breaking 20,125 people at Madison Square Garden on March 30, 1957. Upon ceasing his tag team with Don Fargo, Jackie Fargo formed another tag team with his real-life brother, Sonny, also known in the ring as Roughhouse; this team also enjoyed success. Jim Cornette credits Fargo with popularising wild brawls and the use of tables and chairs in wrestling in the Tennessee area, which he sees as one of the origins of the later 'hardcore' wrestling style.

During the 1960s, Fargo won the NWA Georgia Tag Team title with Joe Fargo and Mario Milano as well as enjoying numerous title reigns capturing the NWA Southern Tag Team Championship with Don Fargo, Lester Welch, Tex Riley, Mario Milano, Sonny Fargo, Len Rossi, Dennis Hall, Jerry Jarrett, Mr. Wrestling and the legendary Lou Thesz. Fargo was the originator of the "Fargo Strut". This charismatic walk in the ring has been copied by other professional wrestlers including Jerry Lawler, Jeff Jarrett and the Fabulous Ones. Although fellow wrestler Buddy Rogers also had a distinctive strut, Fargo claimed that he had never seen Rogers. A longtime mentor to many younger wrestlers in the Memphis area, he later became involved in a feud with former protégé Jerry Lawler who defeated Fargo in a handicap match with Jim White for the NWA Southern Tag Team Championship on March 28, 1973.

Fargo later teamed with George Gulas and Tojo Yamamoto to capture the NWA Mid-America Tag Team Championship title several times during the early 1970s, becoming the first NWA World Six-Man Tag Team Champions along with Gulas and Dennis Hall in November 1973. In 1972, Fargo had a notorious feud with Al Greene, who once during the feud shaved off Fargo's blonde hair. Although retiring in 1984, he joined Jerry Jarrett's Continental Wrestling Association to help The Fabulous Ones (Stan Lane and Steve Keirn) in their feud against The Moondogs before their departure in 1984 and retired shortly thereafter. On June 19, 2002, Fargo appeared on the first NWA-TNA Weekly pay per view along with other NWA legends. Fargo's last matches saw him wrestle both in 2004 and later 2006, at the age of 76.

== Personal life ==
Fargo was hospitalized with pneumonia in both lungs in December 2011. Fargo died on June 24, 2013, after being hospitalized for a week for congestive heart failure. Fargo was survived by three daughters, one grandson, two granddaughters and two great-grandchildren.

== Championships and accomplishments ==
- Atlantic Athletic Commission / Big Time Wrestling
  - AAC/BTW World Heavyweight Championship (1 time)
  - BTW World Tag Team Championship (2 times) – with Don Fargo and Sonny Fargo
- Georgia Championship Wrestling
  - NWA World Tag Team Championship (Georgia version) (1 time) – with Don Fargo
- Gulf Coast Championship Wrestling
  - NWA Southern Tag Team Championship (Gulf Coast Version) (2 times) – with Joey Fargo (1) and Jack Donovan (1)
- National Wrestling Alliance
  - NWA Hall of Fame (Class of 2013)
  - NWA World Tag Team Championship (Northeast version) (1 time, inaugural) - with Don Fargo
- NWA Chicago
  - NWA World Tag Team Championship (Chicago version) (1 time) – with Don Fargo
- NWA Mid-America / Continental Wrestling Association
  - AWA Southern Tag Team Championship (1 time) – with Randy Fargo
  - NWA Mid-America Heavyweight Championship (3 times)
  - NWA Mid-America Tag Team Championship (5 times) – with Tojo Yamamoto (2) and George Gulas (3)
  - NWA Six-Man Tag Team Championship (2 times) – with George Gulas and Dennis Hall
  - NWA Southern Junior Heavyweight Championship (5 times)
  - NWA Southern Tag Team Championship (Mid-America version) (22 times) – with Don Fargo (2), Lester Welch (3), Tex Riley (1), Mario Milano (2), Sonny Fargo (3), Len Rossi (2), Lou Thesz (1), Dennis Hall (1), Jerry Jarrett (4), Don Greene (2), and Randy Fargo (1)
  - NWA United States Tag Team Championship (Mid-America version) (3 times) – with George Gulas (1), Don Carson (1), Jerry Lawler (1)
  - NWA World Tag Team Championship (Mid-America version) (15 times) – with Don Fargo (9), Joe Fargo (1), Mario Milano (1), Len Rossi (1) Herb Welch (1), Robert Fuller (1), and Jerry Jarrett (1)
- Professional Wrestling Hall of Fame
  - Class of 2014
- Wrestling Observer Newsletter
  - Wrestling Observer Newsletter Hall of Fame (Class of 1996)
