= Terry Garvin =

Canadian professional wrestler (1937–1998)

Personal information
- Born: Terrence P. Joyal; March 1, 1937 Montreal, Quebec, Canada
- Died: August 18, 1998 (aged 61) Needham, Massachusetts, U.S.

Professional wrestling career
- Ring name(s): Terry Garvin; Jean Tillet; Terry Dobec
- Billed height: 6 ft 0 in (183 cm)
- Billed weight: 260 lb (120 kg)
- Debut: 1958
- Retired: 1984

Terrence P. Joyal (March 1, 1937 – August 18, 1998), better known by his ring name Terry Garvin, was a Canadian professional wrestler. He is best known for his work with kayfabe brother Ron Garvin, with whom he won several tag team championships in the Southern United States. He is also known for his role in the ring boy scandal, a case of sexual harassment in 1992 that led to the end of his employment with the World Wrestling Federation.

== Professional wrestling career ==
Joyal trained to become a professional wrestler at a gym in the Loisirs St. Jean de Baptiste church in Montreal. He made his wrestling debut in 1958 in Ontario. That same year, he would immigrate to the United States. He held the NWA Southern Tag Team Championship of Gulf Coast Championship Wrestling two times in 1964 with partner Chin Lee.

Beginning in 1965, Garvin began an approximately five-year stint as the tag team partner of Ron Garvin that stated in Montreal. In November 1967, he wrestled for Championship Wrestling from Florida and won the Florida version of the NWA World Tag Team Championship with Ron Garvin, trading it with the team of Paul DeMarco and Lorenzo Parente.

Garvin then began teaming with Duke Myers, and the pair's manager was Jimmy Garvin, the stepson of Ron Garvin. In 1972 in NWA Tri-State, the team won the NWA United States Tag Team Championship. By 1973, he was working in NWA Mid-America, where he won the NWA Mid-America Tag Team Championship three times with Myers. Later in the year, he won the title two more times with Ron Garvin. The Garvins also held the Mid-America version of the NWA Southern Tag Team Championship that year. He returned to the Gulf Coast in 1974, teaming once again with Ron Garvin, to win Southeastern Championship Wrestling's NWA Tennessee Tag Team Championship.

By the early 1980s, Garvin retired from the ring and went on to book for Bob Geigel's NWA territory, Central States Wrestling, in Kansas City. In 1985, Terry was approached by Pat Patterson and eventually was offered a job working for the World Wrestling Federation (WWF) behind the scenes. His employment with WWF ceased on March 2, 1992, for allegations of molesting underage ringboys.

== Personal life ==
Garvin was openly homosexual. He was good friends with fellow gay wrestler Pat Patterson. He knew Patterson, as well as tag team partner Ron Garvin, when he was growing up in Montreal.

Garvin died from cancer on August 18, 1998, at the age of 61, and had been suffering from failing health.

=== Ring boy scandal ===
In the 1990s, Garvin was accused of sexually harassing an underage ring boy, who was fired from his job after refusing Garvin's advances. He later reached a settlement with the WWF; Garvin, as well as Pat Patterson and ring announcer Mel Phillips, resigned after this incident. WWF owner Vince McMahon was interviewed on Larry King Live regarding the incident; during the broadcast, retired wrestler Barry Orton called in and accused Garvin of sexually assaulting him in 1978 when he was 19. Orton also accused Garvin of harming his wrestling career after the sexual advances were declined.

In 2024, Garvin was accused by Nick Kiniski of having propositioned him for sex in the 1980s.

== Championships and accomplishments ==
- Championship Wrestling from Florida
  - NWA World Tag Team Championship (Florida version) (1 time) - with Ron Garvin
- Continental Wrestling Alliance
  - CWA Heavyweight Championship (1 time)
- Gulf Coast Championship Wrestling/Southeastern Championship Wrestling
  - NWA Mississippi Heavyweight Championship (1 time)
  - NWA Southern Tag Team Championship (Gulf Coast version) (2 times) - with Chin Lee
  - NWA Tennessee Tag Team Championship (1 time) - with Ron Garvin
- Mid-South Sports/Georgia Championship Wrestling
  - NWA Georgia Tag Team Championship (2 times) – with Ron Garvin
  - NWA Macon Tag Team Championship (1 time) – with Ron Garvin
- NWA Mid-America
  - NWA Mid-America Tag Team Championship (5 times) – with Ron Garvin (2), Duke Myers (3)
  - NWA Southern Tag Team Championship (Mid-America version) (1 time) – with Ron Garvin
- NWA Tri-State
  - NWA United States Tag Team Championship (Tri-State version) (1 time) - with Duke Myers
- Pro Wrestling Illustrated
  - PWI ranked a totally different Terry Garvin #247 of the top 500 singles wrestlers in the PWI 500 in 1991
- Universal Wrestling Association
  - UWA Heavyweight Championship (1 time)
