= Tojo Yamamoto =

American professional wrestler (1927–1992)

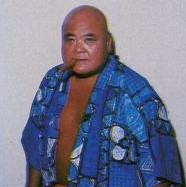
- Yamamoto in 1979

Personal information
- Born: Harold Watanabe; January 6, 1927 Kaanapali, Hawaii, U.S.
- Died: February 19, 1992 (aged 65) Hermitage, Tennessee, U.S.
- Cause of death: Suicide by gunshot

Professional wrestling career
- Ring name(s): P. Y. Chong; P. Y. Chung; Tojo Yamamoto; T. Y. Chung
- Billed height: 5 ft 8 in (173 cm)
- Billed weight: 253 lb (115 kg)
- Billed from: Japan
- Debut: 1953
- Retired: 1991

Harold Watanabe (January 6, 1927 – February 19, 1992), better known by his ring name Tojo Yamamoto, was an American professional wrestler.

== Early life ==
Watanabe was born in Hawaii in 1927 to a Japanese father and an American mother. He served in the United States Marine Corps and worked as a judo instructor.

== Professional wrestling career ==
=== In-ring career ===
Yamamoto had success as a heel as an individual wrestler and part of a tag team, particularly in the southern United States, invoking the natural hatred for World War II enemies (in his case, Prime Minister Tojo and IJN admiral Yamamoto; also successful were The Von Brauners, who wore Iron Crosses and goose-stepped around the ring). He worked in hundreds of different tag-team combinations, and even wrestled Hulk Hogan. According to Hogan, "he hit me in the throat with his cheap shot, I fell through the ropes...(on the floor) he grabbed a cigar out of a guy's mouth and dropped it in my boot". These exemplify the kind of over-the-top heel tactics Yamamoto would use, in addition to the general distrust of the Japanese that many Americans held even after the war.

He was affiliated with Nashville-area wrestling promoter Nick Gulas for most of his career. In Nashville, he was promoted as "the most hated wrestler of all time" and "the epitome of evil". Nick Gulas was notorious for supposedly underpaying his wrestlers, but Yamamoto and Jackie Fargo were notable exceptions. They were two of Gulas's best draws from the early 1960s to the early 1970s, but in addition to the money they generated, they were also reliable and loyal. Yamamoto showed his allegiance despite offers from other promoters, including an offer from his close friend and student Jerry Jarrett when he started promoting shows of his own.

Gulas recognized Yamamoto’s loyalty and rewarded him with consistent bookings and multiple championship opportunities. He held numerous titles during his career, including seven Six-Man Tag Team Championships and 52 Tag Team Championships, often with different partners. Although he achieved significant success in tag team competition, he held fewer singles titles. He won three singles championships, including two reigns as NWA Mid-America Heavyweight Champion, which was the top singles title in the territory. Yamamoto was known for his ability to generate crowd reaction and for his role in working with a range of opponents throughout his career.

Over time, Tojo Yamamoto became aware that his body was failing him, and his in-ring career would come to an end. He constantly wrestled a full schedule without taking days off, leading to injuries that never healed. The problem was compounded by complications from his weight which eventually caused diabetes. All of these factors had taken their toll on his body, but after enjoying so much success he would struggle to accept his physical limitations even up to the day he died. However, it was impossible for him to accept a life away from the sport he loved. Unlike many of his contemporaries, especially his fellow Asian wrestlers, Tojo stuck to wrestling and never appeared in any films or television shows.

=== As a manager ===
Yamamoto was able to stay in the wrestling business and later became a manager of other wrestlers. His rise to fame late in his career took place in the late-1980s, when Yamamoto, while in World Class Championship Wrestling, was managing Phil Hickerson, who was known as P.Y. Chu-Hi. They were involved in a lengthy storyline with Eric Embry, involving control of the World Class promotion. Later, Yamamoto and Hickerson worked a storyline with Chris and Toni Adams, which began with an attack on Toni by Hickerson and Yamamoto during a wrestling match at the Sportatorium.

Yamamoto and Hickerson left World Class in 1990, but Yamamoto returned to the Sportatorium in early 1991 (under the USWA banner) to manage Embry, who had turned heel. During this time he managed many other wrestlers, including Dennis Knight, who later went on to play the roles of Phineas Godwin and Mideon.

=== Contributions as a trainer ===
During and after his years as a manager, knowing that his in-ring career was long since over, Yamamoto continued to contribute to the wrestling business as a prolific trainer. The impact he had on the world of professional wrestling through his training is far-reaching and spans across generations and promotions. He trained dozens of wrestlers who in turn went on to train scores, perhaps hundreds, of additional performers. An example of one of his trainees who went on to teach future generations is Bobby Eaton. Eaton trained countless hopefuls at the WCW Power Plant, but he was also known for his informal coaching of countless younger talent in WCW, until he was released in 2000. He would often go out of his way to make himself available whether it be backstage, in the ring, or most commonly on the road, driving long distances from town to town. Like Yamamoto, he was never considered a "main-eventer", but both had a reputation and willingness to help their opponents look good in the ring and get better from just being in the ring with them.

He passed his decades of wrestling knowledge down to many students, including several future world champions such as Jeff Jarrett, Mike Rapada, and Sid Vicious. He even had a hand in training Jeff Jarrett's father, Jerry Jarrett. Tojo's other students include The Moondogs (Spike and Spot), Jackie Fargo, Bobby Eaton, and "Wildfire" Tommy Rich. Yamamoto would manage some of the wrestlers he trained, but more incredibly he later faced several of his students in the ring; winning (and losing) many of his Tag Team and Six-Man Tag Team Titles in matches with his former students.

== Death ==
Watanabe retired in 1991 due to health problems which included severe diabetes and kidney problems. He died in his home in Hermitage, Tennessee of a self-inflicted gunshot wound in his head in 1992.

== Championships and accomplishments ==
- Championship Wrestling from Florida
  - NWA United States Tag Team Championship (Florida version) (1 time) – with Taro Miyake
- International Championship Wrestling
  - ICW United States Tag Team Championship (1 time) – with Gypsy Joe
- Memphis Wrestling Hall of Fame
  - Class of 1994
- NWA Mid-America / Continental Wrestling Association
  - AWA Southern Tag Team Championship (1 time) – with Wayne Farris
  - CWA World Tag Team Championship (1 time) – with Jerry Jarrett
  - NWA Mid-America Heavyweight Championship (2 times)
  - NWA Mid-America Tag Team Championship (12 times) – with Bill Dromo (2), Tommy Gilbert (1), Jackie Fargo (2), Johnny Marlin (1), George Gulas (2), Gypsy Joe (3) and Great Togo (1)
  - NWA Six-Man Tag Team Championship (7 times) – with George Gulas and Dennis Hall (1), George Gulas and Tommy Rich (2), Gypsy Joe and The Beast (1), Dennis Condrey and Chris Colt (1), David Schultz and Great Togo (1), Bobby Eaton and The Secret Weapon (1)
  - NWA Southern Junior Heavyweight Championship (1 time)
  - NWA Southern Tag Team Championship (Mid-America version) (23 times) – with Ivan Malenkov (1), Alex Perez (6), Mitsu Hirai (2), Tor Kamata (1), Great Higami (1), Johnny Long (2), Johnny Walker (1), Jerry Jarrett (5), Jerry Lawler (2), Eddie Marlin (1) and Jimmy Golden (1)
  - NWA Tri-State Tag Team Championship (Alabama version) (2 times) – with George Gulas
  - NWA United States Tag Team Championship (Mid-America version) (1 time) – with Tommy Rich
  - NWA World Tag Team Championship (Mid-America version) (8 times) – with Alex Perez (1), Mitsu Hirai (1), Tamaya Soto (1), Professor Ito (1), Johnny Long (3), and Ben Justice (1)
- Southeastern Championship Wrestling
  - NWA Southeastern Tag Team Championship (1 time) – with Mr. Kamikaze
  - NWA Tennessee Tag Team Championship (1 time) - with Jerry Jarrett
