= George Gulas =

American professional wrestler

Personal information
- Born: George Gulas Nashville, Tennessee, U.S.
- Parent: Nick Gulas (father)

Professional wrestling career
- Ring name: George Gulas
- Billed height: 6 ft 4 in (193 cm)
- Billed weight: 220 lb (100 kg)
- Debut: 1974
- Retired: 1982

George Gulas (Greek: Γιώργος Γκούλας) is a Greek-American retired professional wrestler. He is best known for his appearances with his father Nick Gulas' professional wrestling promotion NWA Mid-America in the 1970s and early 1980s.

== Professional wrestling career ==
Gulas initially worked for NWA Mid-America, the Tennessee-based promotion owned by his father Nick, as a commentator and referee. While performing as a referee, Gulas was given top billing on promotional materials over the wrestlers. He became a professional wrestler in 1974 and was quickly positioned as a top star. He performed mainly on the eastern side of the NWA Mid-America territory in locations such as Nashville, Tennessee, Chattanooga, Tennessee, and Louisville, Kentucky. He won his first championship later that year, teaming with Rufus R. Jones to win the NWA Southeastern Tag Team Championship.

Gulas formed a tag team with Jackie Fargo, with whom he won the NWA Mid-America Tag Team Championship on three occasions in 1974 and 1975, as well as winning the NWA United States Tag Team Championship once in 1975. In November 1974, Gulas, Fargo, and Dennis Hall won a tournament to be crowned the inaugural NWA World Six-Man Tag Team Champions.

Gulas won the NWA World Six-Man Tag Team Championship five times in 1975 with a variety of partners, and again in 1976 with Charlie Cook and Dennis Hall. In 1976, Gulas won the NWA Mid-America Tag Team Championship a fourth time with Gorgeous George Jr.

In 1977 and 1978, Gulas teamed with Tojo Yamamoto, with the duo winning the NWA Mid-America Tag Team Championship twice.

In 1978, Gulas formed a tag team with Bobby Eaton known as the "Jet Set". The duo won the NWA Mid-America Tag Team Championship twice before separating in 1979.

In August 1979, Gulas unsuccessfully challenged NWA World Heavyweight Champion Harley Race; during the match, Race reportedly undersold Gulas' punches and chops, prompting Gulas to yell "Daddy said sell!" Gulas won the NWA Mid-America Tag Team Championship once more with Ken Lucas in late 1979, then reformed the Jet Set with Eaton to win the title for a third time in early 1980. Gulas won the title twice more with Rocky Brewer later that year, marking a total of 12 reigns as NWA Mid-America Tag Team Champion. Between 1978 and 1980, Gulas won the NWA World Six-Man Tag Team Championship a further six times.

Gulas ceased wrestling regularly in 1980. The following year, NWA Mid-America folded. In 1982, Gulas and his former tag team partner Tojo Yamamoto opened a takeaway restaurant in Nashville, Tennessee selling Greek and "Oriental" dishes.

In the late-2000s, Gulas appeared with the Tennessee-based promotion NWA Main Event as a referee and commissioner. In 2010 and 2011, Gulas promoted a handful of professional wrestling events in Tennessee under the banner "Gulas Old School Wrestling", including a Nick Gulas Memorial Show in January 2011.

Gulas made a one-off return to the ring on November 17, 2023 with the Southern Wrestling Federation in Tullahoma, Tennessee. In his first match in over 40 years, Gulas teamed with Cousin Condry, Goth Knight, Mama Hannah, and Rock Dawg to defeat Diamond, Kaos, Mikey Dunn, Sharp Dressed Man Lawrence, and Zakk Austin.

== Legacy ==
Despite being considered a well-educated and polite person, Gulas was regarded as a wrestler who was pushed far beyond that which his in-ring capabilities or appearance justified. Tim Dills described him as "a mess" and "less than graceful" in the ring and as "tall and thin and not very muscular" in appearance. Wrestler Jerry Lawler described Gulas as "a very bad wrestler" and as "a tall, skinny, gangly guy", while wrestler Harley Race described him as looking like "a human milk bottle" and as being "very, very limited" as a wrestler. He was known for his poorly executed chops and punches.

Gulas is held up as an example of nepotism in the professional wrestling industry. Nick Gulas' insistence on pushing Gulas despite poor audience figures was reportedly a contributing factor in Nick Gulas' business partner Jerry Jarrett electing to split from Gulas in 1977 and found his own company, the Continental Wrestling Association. Journalist Dave Meltzer referred to Gulas as "territory-killing".

== Championships and accomplishments ==
- NWA Mid-America
  - NWA Mid-America Tag Team Championship (12 times) - with Bobby Eaton (3 times), Jackie Fargo (3 times), Gorgeous George Jr. (1 time), Ken Lucas (1 time), Rocky Brewer (2 times), and Tojo Yamamoto (2 times)
  - NWA Southeastern Tag Team Championship (1 time) - with Rufus R. Jones
  - NWA United States Tag Team Championship (Mid-America version) (1 time) - with Jackie Fargo
  - NWA World Six-Man Tag Team Championship (13 times) - with Arvil Hutto and Bobby Eaton (1 time), Bobby Eaton and Jerry Barber (1 time), Bobby Eaton and Mexican Angel (1 time), Charlie Cook and Dennis Hall (1 time), Dennis Hall and Jackie Fargo (2 times); Dennis Hall and Tojo Yamamoto (1 time), Jackie Fargo and Tommy Gilbert (1 time), Joey Rossi and Ken Lucas (1 time), Ken Lucas and Prince Tonga (1 time), Mystery Man and Rocky Brewer (1 time), and Tojo Yamamoto and Tommy Rich (2 times)
