= NWA World Six-Man Tag Team Championship =

Professional wrestling trios tag team championship

Details
- Promotion: National Wrestling Alliance: NWA Chicago (1955–1974); NWA Mid-America (1974–1981); Jim Crockett Promotions/World Championship Wrestling (1984–1989); NWA New Jersey (1998)
- Date established: May 6, 1955
- Date retired: December 1998

Other names
- NWA World Three-Man Tag Team Championship (1955–1974); NWA Six-Man Tag Team Championship (1974–1980)
Statistics
- First champions: Roy McClarity, Pat O'Connor and Yukon Eric
- Most reigns: As a team: Jackie Fargo, George Gulas and Dennis Hall; Tojo Yamamoto, George Gulas and Tommy Rich; The Road Warriors and Dusty Rhodes (2 times); As an individual: George Gulas (12 times)

The NWA World Six-Man Tag Team Championship was a professional wrestling championship sanctioned by the National Wrestling Alliance (NWA) and originally promoted in Chicago as the NWA World Three-Man Tag Team Championship. The NWA Mid-America territory based out of Tennessee re-introduced the title as the NWA Six-Man Tag Team Championship, promoting it from 1974 until 1981. In 1984, another NWA territory Jim Crockett Promotions (JCP) brought the concept back, this time as the "NWA World Six-Man Tag Team Championship", which continued to be promoted by JCP's successor World Championship Wrestling until 1989. The championship was briefly revived in February 1998 by Dennis Coralluzzo's NWA New Jersey territory, also known as Championship Wrestling America. The championship was retired in December 1998. As the name indicates the championship was exclusively for three man teams that competed in six-man tag team matches. Because the championship was a professional wrestling championship, it was won or lost by the decision of the bookers of a wrestling promotion.

== Title history ==
Key
No.	Overall reign number
Reign	Reign number for the specific team—reign numbers for the individuals are in parentheses, if different
Days	Number of days held

No.	Champion	Championship change			Reign statistics		Notes	Ref.
No.	Champion	Date	Event	Location	Reign	Days	Notes	Ref.
NWA World Three-Man Tag Team Championship
1	Roy McClarity, Pat O'Connor and Yukon Eric	May 6, 1955	NWA Chicago Live event	Chicago, Illinois	1	(Note: The length of this title reign is too uncertain to calculate.)	Defeated Reggie Lisowski, Art Neilsen and Don Leo Jonathan to be recognized as the inaugural NWA World Three-Man Tag Team champions.	
Championship history is unrecorded from May 6, 1955 to November 14, 1974.
NWA Six-Man Tag Team Championship
2	Jackie Fargo, George Gulas and Dennis Hall	November 14, 1974	Mid-America Live event	Chattanooga, Tennessee	1	53	Defeated Jerry Lawler, Don Kent and Juan Sebastian in a tournament final to win the vacant championships. During this reign, the championship is renamed to the "NWA Six-Man Tag Team Championship".	
3	Big Bad John, Lorenzo Parente and John Gray	January 16, 1975	Mid-America Live event	Chattanooga, Tennessee	1	(Note: The date the championship was lost has not been documented which means the championship reign lasted anywhere between 16 days and 43 days)		
4	Tojo Yamamoto, George Gulas (2) and Dennis Hall (2)	February 1975	Mid-America Live event	(Note: The location of the match was not captured as part of the championship documentation.)	1	(Note: The date the championship was won has not been documented which means the championship reign lasted anywhere between 10 days and 37 days)		
Championship history is unrecorded from February 1975 to March 10, 1975.
5	Jackie Fargo (2), George Gulas (3) and Dennis Hall (3)	March 10, 1975	Mid-America Live event		2	(Note: The date the championship was lost has not been documented which means the championship reign lasted anywhere between 1 days and 235 days)		
6	Eddie Marlin, Tommy Gilbert, and Ricky Gibson	1975	Mid-America Live event		1	(Note: The date the championship was won and lost has not been documented which means the championship reign lasted anywhere between 1 day and 234 days)		
—	Vacated	1975	—	—	—	—	Championship vacated for undocumented reasons.	
7	Tojo Yamamoto (2), George Gulas (4) and Tommy Rich	October 1975	Mid-America Live event		1	(Note: The date the championship was won has not been documented which means the championship reign lasted anywhere between 1 day and 30 days)	Won a tournament to fill the vacancy.	
8	Al Greene and The Bicentennial Kings (Phil Hickerson and Dennis Condrey)	October 31, 1975	Mid-America Live event		1	12		
9	Tojo Yamamoto (3), George Gulas (5) and Tommy Rich (2)	November 12, 1975	Mid-America Live event		2	50		
	Mitsu Arakawa and The Bounty Hunters (Bounty Hunter I and Bounty Hunter II)	January 1, 1976	Mid-America Live event		1	118		
11	George Gulas (6), Dennis Hall (4) and Charlie Cook	April 28, 1976	Mid-America Live event		1	368		
12	Gorgeous George Jr., Tommy Gilbert (2) and Paul Orndorff	May 1, 1977	Mid-America Live event	Memphis, Tennessee	1	526	Billed as champions in Memphis; may not have been recognized in Nashville.	
Championship history is unrecorded from May 1, 1977 to October 9, 1978.
13	Jerry Barber and The Jet Set (George Gulas (7) and Bobby Eaton)	October 9, 1978	Mid-America Live event		1	(Note: The date the championship was lost has not been documented which means the championship reign lasted anywhere between 23 days and 52 days)		
—	Vacated	November 1978	—	—	—	—	Championship was vacated after Jerry Barber lost a "loser-leaves-the-area" match.	
14	Arvil Hutto and The Jet Set (George Gulas (8) and Bobby Eaton (2))	December 1, 1978	Mid-America Live event	Huntsville, Alabama	1	(Note: The date the championship was lost has not been documented which means the championship reign lasted anywhere between 31 days and 61 days)	Won a tournament to fill a vacancy.	
15	Tojo Yamamoto (4), Gypsy Joe and The Beast	January 1979	Mid-America Live event	Tullahoma, Tennessee	1	(Note: The date the championship was won and lost has not been documented which means the championship reign lasted anywhere between 1 day and 105 days)		
16	The Mexican Angel and The Jet Set (George Gulas (9) and Bobby Eaton (3))	1979	Mid-America Live event		1	(Note: The date the championship was lost has not been documented which means the championship reign lasted anywhere between 1 day and 105 days)		
17	Tojo Yamamoto (5), Dennis Condrey (2) and Chris Colt	April 17, 1979	Mid-America Live event		1	(Note: The date the championship was lost has not been documented which means the championship reign lasted anywhere between 116 days and 146 days)		
Championship history is unrecorded from April 17, 1979 to August 1979.
18	Tojo Yamamoto (6), The Great Togo and David Schultz	August 1979	Mid-America Live event		1	(Note: The date the championship was won and lost has not been documented which means the championship reign lasted anywhere between 1 day and 90 days)		
19	George Gulas (10), Ken Lucas and Prince Tonga	September 1979	Mid-America Live event		1	(Note: The date the championship was won and lost has not been documented which means the championship reign lasted anywhere between 1 day and 90 days)		
—	Vacated	October 1979	—	—	—	—	Championship vacated when Prince Tonga left the NWA Mid-America territory.	
20	George Gulas (11), Ken Lucas (2) and Joey Rossi	November 4, 1979	Mid-America Live event	Tullahoma, Tennessee	1	18		
21	Tojo Yamamoto (7), Bobby Eaton (4) and The Secret Weapon	November 22, 1979	Mid-America Live event	Bowling Green, Kentucky	1	196		
22	George Gulas (12), Rocky Brewer and Mystery Man	June 5, 1980	Mid-America Live event	Bowling Green, Kentucky	1	(Note: The date the championship was abandoned has not been documented which means the championship reign lasted anywhere between 210 days and 574 days)		
—	Deactivated	1981	—	—	—	—	Championship was retired when NWA Mid-America closed.	
NWA World Six-Man Tag Team Championship
23	Ivan Koloff and Nikita Koloff and Don Kernodle	July 18, 1984	JCP Live event	Winston-Salem, North Carolina	1	(Note: The date Kernodle was replaced has not been documented which means the championship reign lasted anywhere between 167 days and 197 days.)	Defeated Rufus R. Jones, Angelo Mosca Jr. and Tom Shaft to revive the title in Jim Crockett Promotions. During this reign, the championship is renamed to the "NWA World Six-Man Tag Team Championship".	
24	The Russians (Ivan Koloff (2), Nikita Koloff (2) and Krusher Khruschev)	January 1985	JCP Live event		1	(Note: The date Kernodle was replaced has not been documented which means the championship reign lasted anywhere between 106 days and 136 days)	Krusher Khruschev replaced Kernodle.	
25	The Russians (Ivan Koloff (4), Nikita Koloff (4) and Baron von Raschke)	January 1986	JCP Live event		1	(Note: The length of this title reign is too uncertain to calculate.)	Baron Von Raschke replaced Khruschev due to an injury.	
26	Dusty Rhodes and The Road Warriors (Animal (2) and Hawk (2))	May 17, 1986	JCP Live event	Baltimore, Maryland	1	646		
27	Ivan Koloff (6) and The Powers of Pain (Warlord and The Barbarian)	February 12, 1988	JCP Live event	Philadelphia, Pennsylvania	1	(Note: The date the championship was vacated has not been documented which means the championship reign lasted anywhere between 100 days and 147 days)		
—	Vacated	June 1988	—	—	—	—	Vacated when The Powers of Pain left for the World Wrestling Federation; team was still recognized as champions until at least June 4, 1988.	
29	Dusty Rhodes and The Road Warriors (Animal and Hawk)	July 9, 1988	JCP Live event	Chicago, Illinois	2	108	Defeated Ric Flair, Tully Blanchard and Arn Anderson to fill vacancy.	
—	Vacated	October 25, 1988	—	—	—	—	The championship was vacated after The Road Warriors turned on Dusty Rhodes, breaking up the team.	
31	Genichiro Tenryu and The Road Warriors (Animal (3) and Hawk (3))	December 7, 1988	Clash of the Champions IV	Chattanooga, Tennessee	1	(Note: The date the championship was abandoned has not been documented which means the championship reign lasted anywhere between 70 days and 83 days)	Animal defeated Dusty Rhodes in a singles match to win the championship and awarded Rhodes' share of the title to Tenryu.	
—	Vacated	February 1989	—	—	—	—	Tenryu and The Roads Warriors vacated the championship so Tenryu could focus on winning the Triple Crown Heavyweight Championship in All Japan Pro Wrestling. World Championship Wrestling (WCW) later promotes the WCW World Six-Man Tag Team Championship as a successor in 1991. In 1994, Tenryu creates the WAR World Six-Man Tag Team Championship as a successor.	
32	The Misfits (Harley Lewis, Derek Domino and Lupus)	February 21, 1998	Championship Wrestling America Live event	Overbrook, New Jersey	1	(Note: The date the championship was abandoned has not been documented which means the championship reign lasted anywhere between 253 days and 282 days)	Defeated Slayer and The Lost Boys (Wolf and Yar) to win the revived title.	
—	Deactivated	December 1998	—	—	—	—	Championship abandoned in December 1998 without a formal announcement.	

== See also ==
- WCWA World Six-Man Tag Team Championship, a splinter title, initially billed as the "Texas version of the NWA World Six-Man Tag Team Championship", promoted in the World Class Wrestling Association (WCWA),.
- WCW World Six-Man Tag Team Championship, a revival of the championship promoted in World Championship Wrestling (WCW).
- WAR World Six-Man Tag Team Championship, a revival of the championship promoted in Japan by Genichiro Tenryu's WAR promotion.
