= Jerry Jarrett =

American wrestler and promoter (1942–2023)

- Born: Jerry Winston Jarrett; September 4, 1942; Nashville, Tennessee, U.S.
- Died: February 14, 2023 (aged 80); Tennessee, U.S.
- Education: Peabody College
- Occupations: Promoter; professional wrestler
- Organizations: Continental Wrestling Association (1977–1989); United States Wrestling Association (1989–1997); NWA Total Nonstop Action (2002–2005)
- Spouse: Deborah Marlin (m. 1960)
- Children: 4, including Jeff
- Parent: Christine Jarrett
- Relatives: Eddie Marlin (father-in-law); Karen Jarrett (daughter-in-law)
- Professional wrestling career
- Ring name(s): Hawaiian Flash; Jerry Jarrett
- Billed height: 5 ft 11 in (180 cm)
- Billed weight: 227 lb (103 kg)
- Trained by: Sailor Moran; Tojo Yamamoto
- Debut: 1965
- Retired: 2002

Jerry Winston Jarrett (September 4, 1942 – February 14, 2023) was an American businessman, professional wrestling promoter, and professional wrestler. Along with his long-term business partner Jerry Lawler, he was a key figure in the history of professional wrestling in the Mid-Southern United States. Described as a "wrestling genius", he was inducted into the National Wrestling Alliance Hall of Fame in 2009.

Jarrett founded the Memphis, Tennessee–based Continental Wrestling Association in 1977. In 1989, he merged the CWA with the Dallas–based promotion World Class Championship Wrestling, creating the United States Wrestling Association which he sold to Lawler in 1997. In 2002, he co-founded NWA:TNA in Nashville with his son Jeff Jarrett, selling his controlling interest to Panda Energy International later in the same year.

== Early life ==
Jarrett was born to Christine "Teeny" Jarrett (1923–1998) in Nashville, Tennessee on September 4, 1942. His parents divorced when he was three. To support Jerry Jarrett and his sister, Christine began working as a ticket vendor at the Nashville Hippodrome for Nick Gulas and Roy Welch, the promoters of NWA Mid-America. Over time Christine Jarrett was given more responsibility by Gulas and Welch, and by the early-1970s, she was promoting shows on their behalf in Indiana and Kentucky. At the age of seven, Jerry Jarrett began selling programs for Gulas and Welch.

After receiving a hardship driving license at the age of 14, Jarrett began promoting professional wrestling events: renting buildings, advertising shows, constructing the ring, selling tickets, and stocking refreshments. He worked as a promoter until enrolling in Peabody College. After graduating in 1963, Jarrett worked four years for the Murray Ohio Manufacturing Company as a purchasing agent before deciding to pursue a career in professional wrestling. He began working for Welch and Gulas as an office assistant and became a referee by default after a referee was a no-show.

== Professional wrestling career ==
While working as a referee in the 1960s, Jarrett became a professional wrestler. His friend Tojo Yamamoto and veteran wrestler Sailor Moran trained him. He wrestled his first match in Hayti, Missouri in 1965. After debuting, Jarrett formed a tag team with Yamamoto. Jarrett performed primarily for NWA Mid-America for the first few years. Between 1970 and 1976, he won the NWA Mid-America Tag Team Championship once, the NWA World Tag Team Championship (Mid-America version) once, and the NWA Southern Tag Team Championship (Mid-America version) ten times. Jarrett also performed for Gulas' Southeastern Championship Wrestling promotion and won the NWA Tennessee Tag Team Championship in 1975.

In 1977, Jarrett founded the Continental Wrestling Association. In addition to booking the promotion, he also occasionally wrestled. He and Yamamoto became the inaugural CWA World Tag Team Champions in July 1980, losing the belts to Austin Idol and Dutch Mantel the following month. In 1985, Jarrett briefly wrestled under a mask as "Hawaiian Flash".

Jarrett formally retired in 1988, although he came out of retirement in 1993 and 1995 to wrestle on several occasions for his United States Wrestling Association.

== Promoting career ==
=== Continental Wrestling Association (1977–1989) ===
In the early-1970s, Jarrett and his mother began promoting professional wrestling shows on behalf of Gulas in the Memphis area. After a dispute with Gulas in 1977, Jerry Jarrett opted to break away beginning a promotion, the Continental Wrestling Association (CWA). With the support of his mother, Jerry Lawler, and Buddy Fuller, Jerry Jarrett built the CWA into a successful promotion, staging events each Monday that regularly sold-out the Mid-South Coliseum and airing television shows each Saturday morning on WMC-TV. In 1981, NWA Mid-America folded due to competition from the CWA, with Gulas selling his territory to Jarrett.

In 1979, The Freebirds asked Jarrett to play "Free Bird" on their entrances. They first tried it in the Mid-South Coliseum and twirling the house spotlights. As a result, Jarrett became one of the first promoters to use music and videos to promote his roster of wrestlers.

In 1984, Jarrett entered into a talent exchange with Bill Watts' Mid-South Wrestling promotion. Jarrett and Lawler advised Watts to bring more young performers into his territory to attract a younger generation of fans, especially females since they would often bring their boyfriends to the shows. In 1988, Jarrett began talks with Verne Gagne, owner of the Minneapolis, Minnesota–based American Wrestling Association, about a potential merger. After negotiations broke down in 1989, Jarrett instead entered into a merger with World Class Championship Wrestling (WCCW), a promotion based in Dallas, to create the United States Wrestling Association.

=== United States Wrestling Association (1989–1995) ===
The United States Wrestling Association began promoting shows in Tennessee and Texas in 1989, with Jarrett aspiring to make it a national promotion. In 1990, WCCW withdrew from the USWA after a revenue dispute and folded shortly afterwards.

In 1992, the USWA began a talent exchange program with the World Wrestling Federation. By the mid-1990s, attendances at the Mid-South Coliseum had fallen sharply, and Jarrett sold his stake in the promotion to Jerry Lawler and Larry Burton before it folded in 1997.

=== World Wrestling Federation (1993–1994) ===
In 1993, Vince McMahon was indicted on suspicion of supplying illegal anabolic steroids to professional wrestlers. Before the trial, McMahon appointed Jarrett to run the company in case he was found guilty and sent to prison. When McMahon was found not guilty, Jarrett left to focus on the USWA.

=== Various ventures (1995–2002) ===
After stepping back from working in promotion, Jarrett worked as a consultant for World Championship Wrestling (WCW) and the WWF.

In 2001, Jarrett suggested the acquisition of WCW, calculating that he could return the company to profitability by aggressively cutting costs. The WWF acquired the company after WCW programming on TBS and TNT was canceled.

=== NWA:TNA (2002–2005) ===
After the sale of World Championship Wrestling to the World Wrestling Federation and the bankruptcy of Extreme Championship Wrestling, the North American professional wrestling industry lacked a viable competitor to the WWF. Jerry and Jeff Jarrett attempted to fill the void. On May 9, 2002, they formed J Sports and Entertainment (JSE), the parent company of NWA:TNA, a new professional wrestling promotion that began airing weekly pay-per-views on In Demand on June 19.

In October 2002, JSE sold a 72% controlling interest in NWA:TNA to Panda Energy. Jarrett remained part of the NWA:TNA management team until departing in late-2005 over a dispute about the direction of the company. In October 2005, he introduced professional wrestler Oleg Prudius to WWE, where he became Vladimir Kozlov.

== Companies ==
After stepping away from professional wrestling, Jarrett owned a construction company and an international television distribution company.

== Personal life and death ==
Jarrett had four children: a daughter Jennifer, and sons Jerry Jr., Jeff, and Jason. Jerry Jarrett became estranged from Jeff in 2005 after they had disputes about their operations while running NWA:TNA; they reconciled in 2015. Jerry Jarrett was married to Eddie Marlin's daughter Deborah.

Jarrett died while undergoing treatment for esophageal cancer on February 14, 2023, at 80.

== Books ==
Jarrett contributed to 2004's The Story of the Development of NWATNA: A New Concept in Pay-Per-View Programming and released the autobiographical The Best of Times in 2011.

== Championships and accomplishments ==
- Continental Wrestling Association
  - CWA World Tag Team Championship (1 time) – with Tojo Yamamoto
- National Wrestling Alliance
  - NWA Hall of Fame (class of 2009)
- NWA Mid-America
  - NWA Southern Tag Team Championship (Mid-America version) (16 times) – with Tojo Yamamoto (7 times), Jackie Fargo (8 times), and Johnny Marlin (1 time)
  - NWA World Tag Team Championship (Mid-America version) (1 time) – with Jackie Fargo
- Southeastern Championship Wrestling
  - NWA Tennessee Tag Team Championship (1 time) – with George Gulas
- United States Wrestling Association
  - Memphis Wrestling Hall of Fame (class of 1994)
- Wrestling Observer Newsletter
  - Wrestling Observer Newsletter Hall of Fame (class of 2018)
