= Dutch Mantell =

Alfred Albert Joe de Re la Gardiur

Personal information
- Born: July 25, 1881 Diekirch, Luxembourg
- Died: January 31, 1941 (aged 59) Amarillo, Texas, U.S.

Professional wrestling career
- Ring name(s): Dutch Mantell; Flying Dutchman

Alfred Albert Joe de Re la Gardiur (July 25, 1881 – January 31, 1941) was a Luxembourgish-American professional wrestler.

== Life and career ==
Alfred Albert Joe de Re la Gardiur was born in Diekirch on July 25, 1881, to a French Protestant father and a Belgian Catholic mother. He ended up in Australia in 1896, where he began boxing and wrestling. Shakespearean actor Robert B. Mantell offered to serve as his second in a bout at Melbourne, and became his mentor. de Re la Gardiur later took the name Dutch Mantell in honor of him.

De Re la Gardiur arrived in New York City in 1900. After a stint in the United States Navy, he became a United States citizen. From 1906 to 1912, he toured the United States as a wrestler in the lightweight, welterweight, middleweight, and heavyweight categories. From 1913 to 1915, he was in Mack Sennett's Keystone Cops in Hollywood.

In 1923, he met shooter Cal Farley for two matches in Amarillo, Texas, relocating there in 1925. He later promoted Farley's tire business, and worked for Farley's "Flying Dutchman Circus", having inspired the name himself. Gardiur died from cancer at the Northwest Texas Hospital in Amarillo, Texas on January 31, 1941.
