= NWA Mid-America =

Former professional wrestling promotion

- Gulas Wrestling Enterprises logo, the company that owned NWA Mid-America
- Founded: 1940
- Defunct: 1981
- Style: Rasslin' / Southern Style
- Headquarters: Dyersburg, Tennessee; Memphis, Tennessee; Knoxville, Tennessee; Birmingham, Alabama
- Founder(s): Nick Gulas; Roy Welch
- Owner(s): Nick Gulas (1940–1981); Roy Welch (1940–1977); John Cazana (1953–1974); Joe Gunther (1940–1970s)
- Parent: Gulas Wrestling Enterprises Inc.
- Formerly: Gulas-Welch Enterprisees Inc.
- Successor: Continental Wrestling Association

NWA Mid-America was a professional wrestling promotion territory under the umbrella of the National Wrestling Alliance (NWA) that promoted shows in Tennessee, Kentucky and Alabama from 1940 until 1981. The company was founded in 1940 by Nick Gulas and Roy Welch and was one of the first promotions to join the NWA after it was founded in 1948. From 1953 until late 1974, John Cazana promoted the Knoxville area and Joe Gunther promoted the Birmingham area from around 1940 until some point in the 1970s. In 1977, promoter Jerry Jarrett and wrestler Jerry Lawler broke away from NWA Mid-America, breaking the Memphis area off to start on the own under the name the Continental Wrestling Association (CWA). Mid-America stopped promoting in 1981 and the CWA took over most of their territory as well as some of the championships promoted by NWA Mid-America.

== History ==
In the 1940s, wrestler and promoter Roy Welch started promoting shows on a regular basis in and around Memphis, Tennessee and would later be joined by Nick Gulas who had been promoting shows in Florida between 1945 and 1947 before joining with Welch to create the Gulas Welch Enterprises Inc. company in the mid 1940s as they began promoting shows primarily in Memphis and Nashville with occasional shows in Chattanooga, Jackson, Louisville, Kentucky, Lexington, Kentucky, and Bowling Green, Kentucky. They also worked with Joe Gunther, a promoter working out of Birmingham, Alabama to expand their promotion into Alabama as well as occasional shows in Mississippi, Ohio, West Virginia, Missouri, Georgia and North Carolina. In 1949, the group joined the National Wrestling Alliance, a national sanctioning body that divided the US into territories. The promotion became known as the NWA Mid-America. In 1953, they added Knoxville, Tennessee to their territory as promoter John Cazana joined the group. The group recognized a number of NWA "World" Championships that were shared across the territories as well as promoting their own NWA branded championships that were mainly defended in the Mid-America territory.

Over the years, tag team wrestling became very popular in the Mid-America territory leading to seven different tag team championships being recognized at the same time in the 1970s by NWA Mid-America: NWA World Tag Team Championship, NWA United States Tag Team Championship, NWA Southern Tag Team Championship, NWA Mid-America Tag Team Championship, NWA Tennessee Tag Team Championship, NWA Kentucky Tag Team Championship and the NWA Tri-State Tag Team Championship. This also meant that a host of well known tag teams either worked in NWA Mid-America on a regular basis or passed through the territory at one point, teams such as The Von Brauners, The Interns, The Infernos, The Bounty Hunters, Tojo Yamamoto and Jerry Jarrett, The Heavenly Bodies (Don and Al Green), Bobby Hart and Lorenzo Parente, The Fabulous Kangaroos, Jerry Lawler and Jim White, The Fabulous Fargos, and a host of other teams were regulars.

In the mid-1970s, the territory was split as Memphis promoter Jerry Jarrett broke away from the Mid-America territory due to disagreements over how Gulas was promoting his son George Gulas, pushing him as one of the top names in the promotion despite not being very talented in the ring. Many of the wrestlers in the promotion were also upset at Nick Gulas for overbooking his son George Gulas in the extremely profitable Memphis half of the territory. At this point, Roy Welch retired from promotion, leaving Nick Gulas as the man in charge of a dwindling territory. With Gulas' insistence on pushing his son and Jarrett's Continental Wrestling Association (CWA) becoming very popular led to a drop in ticket sales and by 1981, Gulas closed the promotion and sold the territory and its championships to the CWA.

== Last show ==
These are the results of the last known NWA Mid-America show held on September 13, 1980.

No.	Results	Stipulations
1	Bobby Eaton (c) vs. Jerry Barber ended in a no-contest	Singles match for the NWA Mid-America Heavyweight Championship
2	Roger Howell and Robert Gibson defeated The Manchurians (Tio and Tapu) by disqualification	Tag team match
3	Bobby Eaton defeated Mike Miller	Singles match
4	Ginger the wrestling bear defeated Terry Sawyer	Bear Wrestling match
5	Larry Latham vs. Ken Lucas ended in a no-contest	Singles match
(c) / – the champion(s) heading into the match

== Championships ==
Championship	Last Recognized Champion	From	Until	Notes
NWA World Heavyweight Championship	Harley Race	January 5, 1948	Still Active	Champion when Mid-America closed.
NWA World Junior Heavyweight Championship	Terry Taylor/Les Thornton	May 1945	Still Active	Champion when Mid-America closed.
NWA World Women's Championship	The Fabulous Moolah	1935	Still Active	Champion when Mid-America closed.
NWA World Tag Team Championship	Mike Graham and Kevin Sullivan	February 5, 1957	1977	
NWA World Six-Man Tag Team Championship	George Gulas, Rocky Brewer and Mystery Man	November 14, 1974	1981	Championship later used by Jim Crockett Promotions.
NWA World Brass Knuckles Championship	Don Fargo	November 15, 1978	1981	
NWA United States Junior Heavyweight Championship	Don Greene	February, 1959	July, 1974	CWA brought the championship back in 1981.
NWA United States Tag Team Championship	Dennis Condrey and Phil Hickerson	March, 1962	April, 1974	
NWA Southern Heavyweight Championship	Rocky Johnson	July 27, 1974	March 20, 1977	Moved to the CWA.
NWA Southern Junior Heavyweight Championship	Jerry Lawler	April 19, 1952	July 27, 1974	Became the Southern Heavyweight Championship.
NWA Southern Tag Team Championship	The Bicentennial Kings (Dennis Condrey and Phil Hickerson)	November, 1945	March 20, 1977	Moved to the CWA.
NWA Mid-America Heavyweight Championship	Johnny Justice	April, 1957	Still Active	Later revived by the CWA.
NWA Mid-America Junior Heavyweight Championship	Dick Steinborn	1980	1980	
NWA Mid-America Tag Team Championship	Rob Conway and Josh Lewis	January, 1972	Still Active	
NWA Mid-America Television Championship	Kevin Sullivan	November 8, 1980	1981	
NWA Tennessee Heavyweight Championship	Sputnik Monroe	June 29, 1959	March 28, 1960	
NWA Tennessee Tag Team Championship	Don Greene and Joey Rossi	July 10, 1956	May, 1977	
NWA Kentucky Heavyweight Championship	Buck Moore	1950s	1950s	
NWA Kentucky Tag Team Championship	The Masked Superstars	March, 1975	February, 1979	
NWA Tri-State Tag Team Championship (Alabama version)	Tojo Yamamoto and George Gulas	October, 1971	August, 1977	
NWA Tri-State Heavyweight Championship (Tri-State version)	Dennis Condrey	September 12, 1960	October, 1970	

== See also ==
- List of National Wrestling Alliance territories
- List of independent wrestling promotions in the United States
