= Professional wrestling authority figures =

This list brings together authority figures—people who hold on-screen power—in professional wrestling promotions or brands within North America. The North American wrestling industry portrays authority figures as responsible for making matches, providing rules and generally keeping law and order both in and outside the ring. The role can vary according to disposition as a face authority figure tends to give what the fans want and does what is fair while heel authority figures tend to run their shows out of their own self-interest.

== WWE authority figures ==
From its founding in 1963 to 1997, the WWE looked to a president as an authority figure. The president had booking power and controlled all wrestlers. However, in 1997 the commissioner replaced the president, with Sgt. Slaughter serving as the first WWE commissioner. During the Attitude Era (1997–2002), not only the commissioner, but also Vince McMahon (through his position as WWE chairman under his evil character Mr. McMahon) had booking power. McMahon usually used his power in order to haze his kayfabe nemesis, Stone Cold Steve Austin. When Shawn Michaels served as commissioner, he could overrule McMahon, but he exercised his booking power only sporadically and was working with an ironclad contract where he could not be fired. When Mick Foley acquired the position, he took full reign until he was fired from the position.

Upon splitting WWE into two separate brands in the WWE brand extension of 2002, on-screen co-owners Vince McMahon and Ric Flair proceeded to draft WWE wrestlers into two separate rosters. Flair took ownership of Raw while McMahon controlled SmackDown. After McMahon regained control of the entire company, he removed Flair from control of Raw, relinquished his own position and appointed separate general managers to control the different brands.

On July 18, 2011, Triple H came to Raw and told Vince McMahon that the board of directors (kayfabe) revoked his "day-to-day operation power" and named him to manage it instead. After that, Triple H became the WWE's chief operating officer, who had the booking power in WWE on both the Raw and SmackDown brands until the board of directors stripped him of his power and named John Laurinaitis the interim general manager of Raw.

=== Presidents and commissioners ===
- Willie Gilzenberg, WWF president (1963 – November 15, 1978, died while still in position)
- Hisashi Shinma, WWF president (1978–1984)
- Jack Tunney, WWF president (September 1984 – July 12, 1995)
- Gorilla Monsoon, WWF president (July 12, 1995 – August 4, 1997; interim president July 12, 1995 – March 31, 1996)
- Roddy Piper, WWF interim president (1996; substitution for an injured Gorilla Monsoon)
- Sgt. Slaughter, WWF commissioner (August 4, 1997 – November 23, 1998)
- Shawn Michaels, WWF commissioner (November 23, 1998 – May 15, 2000)
- Mick Foley, WWF commissioner (Note: While Mick Foley was commissioner in 2000, he was the ultimate on-screen authority, overriding everyone else) (June 26 – December 18, 2000; October 11 – November 19, 2001)
  - Debra, Lt. commissioner (October 30, 2000 – March 5, 2001)
- William Regal, WWF commissioner (March 8 – October 11, 2001)

=== Corporate officers ===
From 1996 onwards, the corporate roles of Vince McMahon and his wife Linda were gradually acknowledged in WWF programmes and were subsequently included in storylines. The following list gives the development of corporate offices as portrayed in storylines and should not be confused with their counterparts in the actual structure in WWE LLC (and its parent TKO Group Holdings) and its predecessors.

- Vince McMahon, Titan Sports/WWF/WWE, Inc. chairman of the board (1980-January 26, 2024 (Note: This is the date of his real-life resignation from TKO Group Holdings, as McMahon had not appeared on WWE television since his 2022 retirement.), first acknowledged in 1996)
- Linda McMahon, WWF, Inc. chief executive officer (1994 – June 7, 1999) (Note: In real life, Linda McMahon served on the board of directors for the WWF's parent company from 1980. Vince McMahon appointed her to the position of CEO in 1994 during the WWF steroid scandal.)
- Stone Cold Steve Austin, chief executive officer (June 7 – June 27, 1999) (Note: Storyline CEO only; appointed in storyline by Linda McMahon. Lost his position back to Vince McMahon in a ladder match at King of the Ring.)
- Vince McMahon, chief executive officer (June 27 – September 2, 1999)
- Linda McMahon, chief executive officer (September 2, 1999 – September 16, 2009) (Note: Linda McMahon gained control after her husband Vince McMahon was barred from appearing on WWF television after Fully Loaded.)
- Vince McMahon, chief executive officer (September 16, 2009 – July 22, 2022) (Note: Triple H relieved Vince McMahon from his operative duties and became COO. However, Vince McMahon remained chairman and occasionally appeared as such on WWE programmes.)
- Triple H, chief operating officer (July 18, 2011 – 2019)
  - Theodore Long, assistant to the COO (September 5 – October 10, 2011) (Note: Theodore Long announced that Triple H had given him the power to book Raw when necessary. This arrangement ended when John Laurinaitis became interim general manager of Raw.)
  - Kane, director of operations (November 4, 2013 – November 24, 2014; January 5, 2015 – October 25, 2015)
  - Stephanie McMahon, Raw commissioner (July 11, 2016 – December 17, 2018)
    - Mick Foley, general manager of Raw (July 18, 2016 – March 20, 2017)
    - Kurt Angle, general manager of Raw (April 3, 2017 – December 17, 2018)
      - Baron Corbin, constable of Raw (June 4 – December 16, 2018)
      - Alexa Bliss, supervisor of the Women's Division (November 26 – December 17, 2018)
    - Drake Maverick, general manager of 205 Live (January 30, 2018 – April 12, 2020)
    - William Regal, general manager of 205 Live (April 12, 2020 – January 5, 2022)
  - Shane McMahon, SmackDown commissioner (July 11, 2016 – October 4, 2019)
    - Daniel Bryan, general manager of SmackDown (July 18, 2016 – April 10, 2018)
    - Paige, general manager of SmackDown (April 10 – December 17, 2018)
- Triple H, chief content officer (September 6, 2022 – present)
  - Adam Pearce, WWE official (January 17, 2020 – October 13, 2023)
  - Sonya Deville, WWE official (January 1, 2021 – May 9, 2022)
  - Adam Pearce, general manager of Raw (October 13, 2023 – present)
  - Nick Aldis, general manager of SmackDown (October 13, 2023 – July 24, 2026)
  - Adam Pearce, general manager of SmackDown (July 24, 2026 – July 31, 2026)
  - Nick Aldis, general manager of SmackDown (August 1, 2026 - present)
  - Ava, general manager of NXT (January 23, 2024 – January 30, 2026)
  - Stevie Turner, prime minister of Evolve (March 26, 2025 – November 6, 2025)
  - Robert Stone, general manager of NXT (February 3, 2026 – present)
  - Timothy Thatcher, foreman of Evolve (March 11, 2026 – present)

== All Elite Wrestling authority figures ==
After the All In wrestling event in 2018, Ring of Honor wrestlers Cody Rhodes, Kenny Omega, and The Young Bucks partnered with Shahid Khan and Tony Khan, the owners of Fulham F.C. and Jacksonville Jaguars, to form All Elite Wrestling (AEW) on January 1, 2019. AEW's storyline hierarchy is generally reflective of its real-life hierarchy, but exaggerated for dramatic effect.

- Shahid Khan, co-owner (January 1, 2019 – present)
- Tony Khan, co-owner, president and general manager (January 1, 2019 – present)
- The Young Bucks, executive Vice Presidents (January 1, 2019 – July 12, 2025)
- Cody Rhodes, executive Vice President (January 1, 2019 – February 15, 2022)
- Kenny Omega, executive Vice President (January 1, 2019 – present)
  - Christopher Daniels, interim executive Vice President (May 29, 2024 – December 28, 2024)

== TNA Wrestling figures ==
=== Chairman (CEO) ===
- Jeff Jarrett (2002–2003)
  - Jerry Jarrett (2002–2003)
- Panda Energy (2003–2016)
- Dixie Carter (August 12, 2016 – January 5, 2017)
- Anthem Sports & Entertainment (January 5, 2017 – present)

=== Director of Authority ===
The Director of Authority operated as an on-screen, fictional authority figure for the company.

- Erik Watts (July 23, 2003 – January 28, 2004)
- Don Callis (January 28 – February 4, 2004)
- Jeff Jarrett (February 11 – February 18, 2004)
- Vince Russo (February 18 – November 7, 2004)
- Dusty Rhodes (November 7, 2004 – June 17, 2005)
- Santino Marella (January 13, 2023 – present)

=== Director of operations ===
- Daria Rae (January 15, 2026 – present)

=== NWA Championship Committee ===
TNA Wrestling also maintained a championship committee, which was established in 2004 to help the director of authority to book matches and to keep contenders in proper order. The committee members also served as guest judges for Impact! when broadcast by Fox Sports Net as all matches had a time limit and if the match went to time, a judge had to make the call as to who had won. By June 2005, the committee was dropped and only Larry Zbyszko made appearances for the company. Despite the name, the National Wrestling Alliance had no direct relationship with the committee. During its existence, TNA controlled the booking of the NWA World Heavyweight Championship and treated it as its foremost title.

The committee consisted of:

- Dusty Rhodes (founder, original member, November 2004 – June 2005)
- Harley Race (original member, November 2004 – June 2005)
- Terry Funk (original member, November 2004 – March 2005)
  - Funk never appeared on-screen in TNA
- Roddy Piper (replacement for Funk, March – June 2005)
- Larry Zbyszko (original member, November 2004 – June 2005)

=== Management director ===
- Jim Cornette (July 16, 2006 – May 21, 2009)
  - Matt Morgan – bodyguard/enforcer (August 9, 2007 – April 10, 2008)

=== President (COO) ===
- Jerry Jarrett (2002–2004)
- Jeff Jarrett (2004–2009)
- Dixie Carter (April 19, 2009 – October 14, 2010; November 25, 2010 – March 3, 2011; October 16, 2011 – August 12, 2016) (Note: Dixie Carter has been legitimately TNA president since 2003 after Panda Energy International became majority shareholder of TNA. However, Jerry Jarrett continued to appear until 2003 as president and Jeff Jarrett was recognised on screen from 2004 until 2009 when Carter began to have the on-screen role.)
  - Hulk Hogan – managing partner (January 4 – October 14, 2010)
  - Rockstar Spud – chief of staff (November 22, 2013 – March 9, 2014)
- Hulk Hogan – (October 14 – November 25, 2010), (March 3, 2011 – October 16, 2011) (Note: Hulk Hogan was (storyline) president from October 2010 to October 2011 after Carter unknowingly signed her power away to him in a contract. Carter was re-established as on-screen President following Sting defeating Hogan at Bound For Glory.)
  - Mick Foley – network consultant (May 3 – June 2, 2011)
- Billy Corgan (August 12 – December 2016)
- Scott D'Amore (March 13, 2023 – February 7, 2024)
- Anthony Cicione (February 7, 2024 – February 12, 2025)
- Carlos Silva (February 12, 2025 – present)

=== Vice president ===
- Jeff Jarrett (2002–2003)

=== On-screen executive ===
- Mick Foley – co-owner/executive shareholder (October 23, 2008 – March 22, 2010); network consultant/executive (May 12, 2011 – June 2, 2011)
- Billy Corgan (2016)
- Karen Jarrett – Impact executive (January 5 – October 23, 2017)
- Bruce Prichard (January 5 – August 17, 2017)
- Jim Cornette (August 17 – September 18, 2017)

==== General manager (GM) ====
- Sting (October 20, 2011 – March 22, 2012)
- Hulk Hogan (March 29, 2012 – October 3, 2013)
- Bully Ray (July 15 – August 5, 2015)
- Jeff Jarrett (August 12 – September 16, 2015)
- Ethan Carter III (July 8, 2015; May 31, 2016)

=== TNA investor ===
- MVP (January 30 – June 26, 2014) (Note: MVP was also the director of wrestling operations, but he lost his position on June 26, 2014. The investor storyline was dropped after that.)

=== (Executive) director of wrestling operations ===
- MVP (March 9 – June 26, 2014) (Note: As a result of the outcome of the Lethal Lockdown match at Lockdown, MVP partly took control of TNA as the (storyline) director of wrestling operations.)
- Kurt Angle (June 26, 2014 – January 7, 2015) (Note: As a result of a decision made by TNA's board of directors, on June 20, 2014 (aired on June 26, 2014, episode of Impact Wrestling), MVP was removed as the director of wrestling operations, with Kurt Angle announced as MVP's replacement as the executive director of wrestling operations.)

==== Knockouts Division authority figures ====
- Traci Brooks – Knockouts commissioner (August 28, 2008 – January 2009)
- Ms. Tessmacher – general manager (September 20 – October 14, 2010)
- Karen Jarrett – executive vice president (September 1 – December 15, 2011)
  - Traci Brooks – executive assistant (September 1 – December 15, 2011)
- Brooke Hogan – Knockouts vice president (May 31, 2012 – August 16, 2013)
- Maria Kanellis – leader of the Knockouts (April 19 – October 13, 2016) (Note: She was told by TNA chairwoman and chief strategy officer Dixie Carter on the September 8, 2016, episode of Impact Wrestling that the decision was made by the TNA Board of Directors that as long as she has possession of the TNA Knockouts Championship, she has no decision-making authority as her being both Knockouts champion and leader of the Knockouts creates a conflict of interest. On the October 13, 2016, episode of Impact Wrestling, she lost a title vs. Knockouts leadership match against Gail Kim, thus completely removing her as leader of the Knockouts.)
  - Allie – apprentice (May – October 13, 2016)
  - Sienna – bodyguard/enforcer (May – October 13, 2016)

===== Xplosion commissioner =====
- Desmond Wolfe (May 16 – June 16, 2011)

=== Executive producer ===
- Eric Bischoff (January 4, 2010 – October 16, 2011)
  - Ms. Tessmacher – executive assistant (April 28 – September 20, 2010)
- Jeff Jarrett (February 1 – October 23, 2017)

=== Representative of the TNA Board of Directors ===
- Earl Sullivan Armstrong (June 26, 2014) (Note: Made the announcement on the June 26, 2014, episode of Impact Wrestling that MVP was stripped of his title as director of wrestling operations, then later on announced Kurt Angle as MVP's replacement as executive director of wrestling operations.)

=== Representative of the Impact Board of Directors & Consultant/Advisor to Anthem ===
- Tommy Dreamer (June 17, 2021 – November 2021) (Note: Made the announcement on the June 17, 2021, episode of Impact Wrestling that Don Callis was fired from Impact and also ceased being Executive Vice President. Dreamer also reinstated Sami Callihan. On the June 24, 2021, episode, it was revealed that Dreamer had been asked by Anthem by stay on as the company's Consultant/Advisor within Impact.)

=== Executive Vice President ===
- Don Callis (December 5, 2017 – June 17, 2021)
- Scott D'Amore (December 5, 2017 – March 13, 2023)

== Ring of Honor authority figures ==
- Rob Feinstein – founder
- Cary Silkin – owner (February 23, 2002 – May 21, 2011)
- Gabe Sapolsky – head of talent relations (February 23, 2002 – October 26, 2008)
- Jim Cornette – commissioner (October 2, 2005 – November 4, 2006)
- Ric Flair – ROH ambassador (April 5 – May 30, 2009)
- Jim Cornette – executive producer (September 26, 2009 – October 13, 2012)
- Joe Koff – ROH chief operating officer (May 21, 2011 – May 5, 2022)
- Nigel McGuinness – match-coordinator (November 3, 2012 – December 2016)
- Tony Khan – owner (March 2, 2022 – present)
  - Tony Khan, Paul Wight, Jerry Lynn- Board of Directors (June 6, 2022 – present)

== International Wrestling Association authority figures ==
- Savio Vega, general manager (2001–2006)
- Orlando Toledo, general manager (2006–2010)
- Joe Bravo, general manager (2010–2012)

== World Championship Wrestling authority figures ==
Ted Turner purchased Jim Crockett Promotions and launched World Championship Wrestling (WCW) in 1988. The company went through a series of vice presidents and bookers, ranging from those with little wrestling experience to those entrenched in the old territorial methods of promotion until Eric Bischoff took control in 1994. His tenure saw the creation of Nitro, the start of the Monday Night War and the formation of the New World Order. Declining ratings saw Bischoff ousted in 1999 and former WWF writer Vince Russo was hired in an attempt to salvage the company. WCW was purchased by the WWF in March 2001, but the company was featured prominently on WWF television as part of the Invasion storyline for the remainder of the year.

=== Owner ===
- Ted Turner (October 11, 1988 – March 23, 2001)
  - Terry McGuirk – President (including Executive President) of Turner Sports (1987–1994)
  - Harvey Schiller – President of Turner Sports (1994–1999)
  - Mark Lazarus – President of Turner Sports (1999–2001)
- Shane McMahon (March 23 – November 18, 2001) (Note: Shane McMahon owned WCW as part of the Invasion storyline, with the rights actually owned by WWF.)
- WWE (November 18, 2001 – present)

=== Executive vice president ===
- Jim Herd (1989–1992)
- Kip Allen Frey (1992)
- Bob Dhue (1992–1995)
- Eric Bischoff (1996–1998)
- Nick Lambros (1998–1999)
- Bill Busch (1999–2001)

==== Vice President of Wrestling Operations ====
- Bill Watts (1992–1993)
- Ole Anderson (1993)

==== Senior Vice President ====
- Eric Bischoff (1994–1996)

=== President ===
- Jack Petrik (November 21, 1988 – April 1992)
- Bill Shaw (April 1992 – June/July 1995)
- Dr. Harvey Schiller (June/July 1995 – January 1997)
- Eric Bischoff (January 1997–September 1999)
- Ric Flair (December 28, 1998 – July 19, 1999) (Note: Flair became on-screen president after defeating Eric Bischoff in a match on Nitro.)
  - Charles Robinson – vice president (April 19 – July 19, 1999)
  - Roddy Piper – vice president (June 14 – July 19, 1999)
- Sting (July 19 – August 1999) (Note: Sting became on-screen president after defeating Ric Flair in a match on Nitro, then several weeks later gave up the position for WCW to name a new president.)

=== Commissioner ===
- Nick Bockwinkel (January 27, 1994 – June 18, 1995)
- J. J. Dillon (April 21, 1997 – October 25, 1999)
  - Roddy Piper – acting/interim commissioner (September 8, 1997 – 2000)
- Terry Funk (January 3 – January 16, 2000)
- Kevin Nash (January 16 – April 10, 2000)
  - Jeff Jarrett – acting/interim commissioner (January 31 – February 9, 2000)
- Ernest Miller (May 31 – October 29, 2000; January 14 – February 12, 2001; February 18 – February 26, 2001)
- Mike Sanders (October 29, 2000 – January 14, 2001)
- Lance Storm (February 12 – February 18, 2001)
- William Regal (October 15 – November 18, 2001) (Note: Regal served as the Alliance commissioner during the Invasion storyline.)

=== The Powers That Be ===
- Vince Russo (October 5, 1999 – January 1, 2000) (Note: Upon arriving in WCW, Russo and Ferrara were introduced as the Powers That Be, a mysterious on-screen presence that controlled the company.)
- Ed Ferrara

=== Leaders of The New Blood ===
- Eric Bischoff (April 10 – July 9, 2000) (Note: Bischoff returned to WCW as an unspecified authority figure on April 10, 2000, and alongside Vince Russo took control of the company as the leaders of The New Blood group.)
- Vince Russo (April 10 – October 2000)

=== Other positions ===
- Ric Flair – On-screen CEO (October 30, 2000 – March 26, 2001)

== Extreme Championship Wrestling authority figures ==
- Tod Gordon – owner (1992 – May 1995)
- Paul Heyman – owner (May 1995 – April 2001)
  - Cyrus – Network representative (1999–2001)
- Stephanie McMahon – owner (July 9 – November 18, 2001) (Note: Stephanie McMahon owned ECW as part of the Invasion storyline, with the rights actually owned by WWE chairman Vince McMahon.)
- WWE – owner (January 28, 2003 – present)

== Chikara authority figures ==
=== Founder ===
- Mike Quackenbush
- Reckless Youth

=== Owner ===
- Mike Quackenbush (2002–2020)
- The Titor Conglomerate (storyline) (2010–2013)
- Robbie Ellis (storyline) (2014–2020)

=== Commissioner ===
- Bob Saget (2006–2008)
- Dave Coulier (2008–2010)

=== Director of Fun ===
- Leonard F. Chikarason (2005–2009)
- Dieter VonSteigerwalt (2009–2010)
- Wink Vavasseur (2010–2013)
- Mike Quackenbush (2014–2017)
  - Bryce Remsburg – acting/interim director of Fun (2016)
- Bryce Remsburg (2017–2020)

=== Other positions ===
- Cavalier Jones – Member of the Chikara Board of Directors (2004)
- Wink Vavasseur – executive auditor of the board of directors (2010–2013)
- Jakob Hammermeier – King of Chikara (unofficial, 2016)

== AAA authority figurers ==
- Nick Khan – President, WWE
- Alberto Fasja – Executive chairman, Filip
- Dorian Roldán – CEO and Director of Operations, AAA
- Marisela Peña – President, AAA
- Rey Mysterio – General manager

== See also ==
- List of professional wrestlers
- List of professional wrestling promoters
