= Jeff Jarrett =

American professional wrestler and promoter (born 1967)

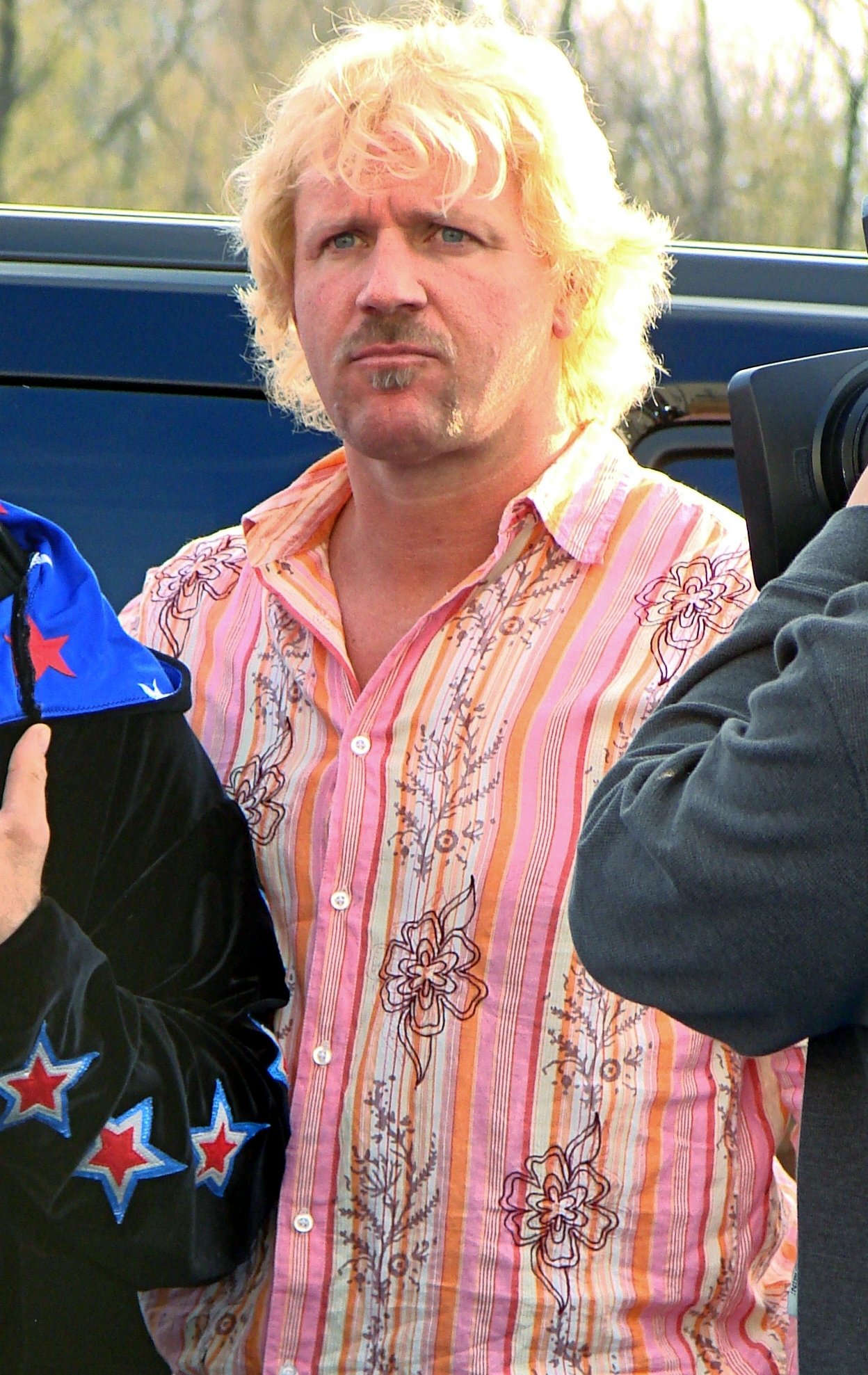
- Jarrett in 2007

Personal information
- Born: Jeffrey Leonard Jarrett; July 14, 1967 (age 59) Hendersonville, Tennessee, U.S.
- Spouses: Jill Gregory (m. 1992; died 2007); Karen Jarrett (m. 2010)
- Children: 3
- Family: Jerry Jarrett (father); Eddie Marlin (grandfather); Christine Jarrett (grandmother)

Professional wrestling career
- Ring name(s): The Blue Blazer; Jeff Jarrett
- Billed height: 6 ft 0 in (183 cm)
- Billed weight: 230 lb (104 kg)
- Billed from: Nashville, Tennessee
- Trained by: Tojo Yamamoto
- Debut: April 6, 1986

Jeffrey Leonard Jarrett (born July 14, 1967) is an American professional wrestler and professional wrestling promoter. He is signed to All Elite Wrestling (AEW). He is also the founder of the revived Acclaim Entertainment.

Beginning his career in his father Jerry Jarrett's Continental Wrestling Association (CWA) in 1986, Jarrett first came to prominence upon debuting with a country music star gimmick in the World Wrestling Federation (WWF, now WWE) in 1993. Over the next nine years, he alternated between the WWF and its main competitor, World Championship Wrestling (WCW). After WCW was purchased by the WWF in 2001, Jarrett joined the upstart World Wrestling All-Stars (WWA) promotion. In 2002, Jarrett and his father together founded NWA: Total Nonstop Action (NWA-TNA, now Total Nonstop Action Wrestling). After departing the promotion in 2014, Jarrett founded another new promotion, Global Force Wrestling (GFW). After a failed merger between TNA and GFW, he cut ties with TNA. Jarrett then wrestled in Mexico for Lucha Libre AAA Worldwide before returning to WWE in January 2019 as an on-screen talent and producer. He departed WWE once more in August 2022, making his debut with AEW that November.

Jarrett has headlined multiple pay-per-view events, including TNA's flagship annual event, Bound for Glory, on two occasions (in 2005 and 2006). A third-generation wrestler, Jarrett has had over 80 championship reigns throughout his career, among them the NWA World Heavyweight Championship (six times), WCW World Heavyweight Championship (four times), and AAA Mega Championship (twice). He was inducted into the TNA Hall of Fame in 2015 and the WWE Hall of Fame in 2018.

== Early life ==
Jeffrey Leonard Jarrett was born on July 14, 1967, in Hendersonville, Tennessee. He comes from a family with deep ties to the professional wrestling industry. His father, Jerry Jarrett, was a prominent wrestler and promoter, best known for his work in the Southern United States. Jarrett's maternal grandfather, Eddie Marlin, was also a professional wrestler, and his paternal grandmother, Christine Jarrett, worked for longtime Nashville promoters Nick Gulas and Roy Welch, making him a third-generation member of the wrestling business.

Jarrett attended Goodpasture Christian School in Madison, Tennessee, where he participated in athletics, including basketball. While still in high school, he began working in the wrestling business, initially serving as a referee for his father's promotion, the Continental Wrestling Association (CWA).

== Professional wrestling career ==
=== Early career (1986–1993) ===
Jarrett made his professional wrestling debut on April 6, 1986, at the age of 18. The match took place in the Continental Wrestling Association, where he had been working as a referee. In a storyline angle, Tony Falk, who was on an extended losing streak, challenged Jarrett to a match, which ended in a ten-minute time-limit draw. Jarrett received his in-ring training from his father, Jerry Jarrett, and longtime Tennessee-area wrestler and trainer Tojo Yamamoto.

During the late 1980s, Jarrett competed for multiple regional promotions, including the American Wrestling Association (AWA) and the Continental Wrestling Federation (CWF). In 1989, Jerry Jarrett purchased the Texas-based World Class Championship Wrestling (WCCW) and merged it with the CWA to form the United States Wrestling Association (USWA), based in Memphis, Tennessee. Jeff Jarrett became one of the promotion's top stars, capturing the USWA Southern Heavyweight Championship ten times and the USWA World Tag Team Championship fifteen times with a variety of partners.

Jarrett also began wrestling internationally during this period. In 1990, he toured Japan with the Super World of Sports (SWS) promotion, which featured working agreements with American talent. He also competed in Puerto Rico for the World Wrestling Council (WWC), as well as on the broader independent circuit.

=== World Wrestling Federation (1992, 1993–1996) ===
==== Early appearances (1992) ====
Jarrett made his first appearance with the World Wrestling Federation (WWF) on August 9, 1992, during a live event at the Memphis Pyramid. As part of a cross-promotional storyline with the United States Wrestling Association (USWA), Jarrett sat ringside alongside Jerry Lawler and issued an open challenge to any WWF wrestler. That evening, he faced Kamala in an impromptu match, winning by disqualification. Bret Hart accepted Jarrett's challenge for a future match in Memphis, but the bout was later canceled due to inclement weather.

Beginning in October 1992, Jarrett wrestled several untelevised matches for the WWF, primarily on house shows. Notable victories during this period included wins over Mondo Kleen and Barry Horowitz. On October 28, at a Wrestling Challenge taping in Louisville, Kentucky, Jarrett defeated Rick Martel. After the canceled match with Hart, Jarrett returned to competing full-time in the USWA.

==== Double J persona and early feuds (1993–1994) ====
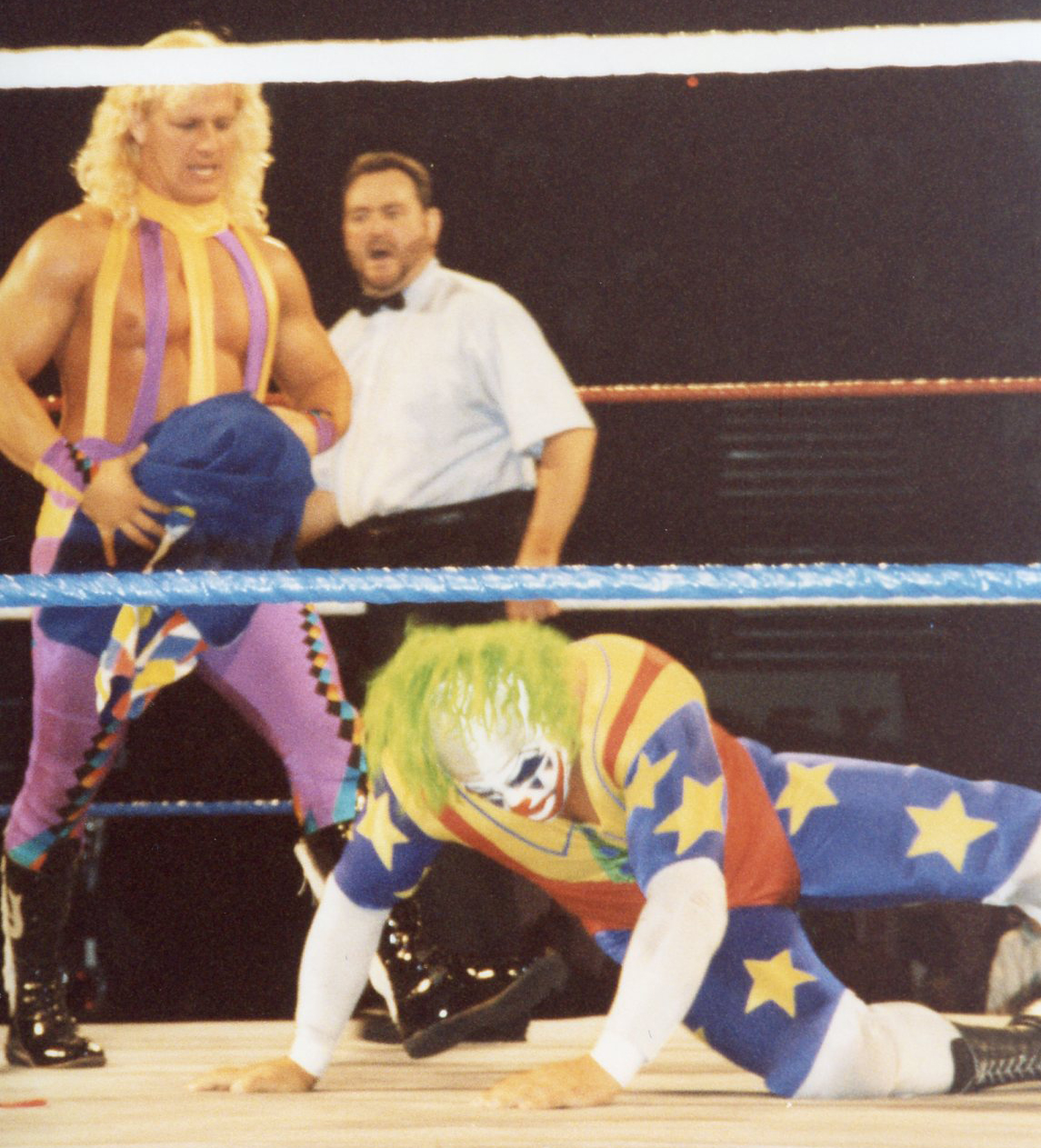
Jarrett (left) wrestling Doink the Clown in 1994

Nearly a year later, Jarrett returned to the World Wrestling Federation. He made his televised return on October 23, 1993, on WWF Superstars of Wrestling as a heel under the gimmick of "Double J" Jeff Jarrett, a country music singer who intended to elevate his singing career through his exposure as a wrestler. Jarrett's character would strut to the ring wearing flashing "Double J" hats and ring attire, while he punctuated his promos with the phrase "Ain't I great?". He ended his interviews by distinctly spelling out his name ("That's J-E-Double-F, J-A-Double-R, E-Double-T!"). He would often win matches by smashing opponents with an acoustic guitar, which was nicknamed "El Kabong" after the cartoon character Quick Draw McGraw. The "Double J" character was a country music version of The Honky Tonk Man.

Jarrett had his first televised match with the WWF on the December 20, 1993, episode of Raw, defeating P.J. Walker. Jarrett made his pay-per-view debut in January 1994 at the Royal Rumble, entering the Royal Rumble match as the 12th participant and was eliminated less than 90 seconds later by Randy Savage. Also at the Royal Rumble, Jarrett participated in attacking The Undertaker and forcing him into the casket, an incident that would be a focal point in Undertaker's rematch later that year. Jarrett was scheduled to wrestle in a five vs. five tag match at WrestleMania X, but the match did not take place due to time constraints. However, the match did take place on the April 4 episode of Raw, with Jarrett's team winning. During this time, Jarrett started having what would be a very long string of matches with Doink (Ray Apollo) during house shows in which he usually won the match. Despite getting past Lex Luger by countout in the first round, Jarrett lost in the second round of the 1994 King of the Ring tournament, being pinned by the 1-2-3 Kid. Only weeks before SummerSlam, the WWF promoted a match as part of a "rap versus country" rivalry that pitted Jarrett against Mabel who portrayed a rapper. There was little buildup for the match until Mabel tried to provoke Jarrett into a fight, but Jarrett simply exited. At SummerSlam, Jarrett won the match by pinfall.

Around this time, Jarrett began a feud with the 1-2-3 Kid's friend, WWF Intercontinental Champion Razor Ramon. Jarrett would face both men at Survivor Series 1994, Jarrett's team competed in another five vs. five tag team match, this time with elimination rules. Jarrett's team lost when all the members of the team including himself were counted out. Later during the event, Jarrett once again tried to illegally attack The Undertaker, but this time was stopped by Chuck Norris. In January 1995, Jarrett would once again feud with Bret Hart, ultimately losing to Hart on the January 23 episode of Raw.

==== WWF Intercontinental Champion (1995–1996) ====
At the 1995 Royal Rumble in Tampa, Florida, Jarrett defeated Razor Ramon to win the WWF Intercontinental Championship thanks to interference by his assistant, The Roadie. In an effort to become a dual champion, Jarrett challenged Diesel for the WWF World Heavyweight Championship in the main event of the February 20 episode of Raw, but lost the match. Razor Ramon received a rematch at WrestleMania XI which Jarrett lost by disqualification, but retained the Intercontinental Championship. Jarrett and The Roadie lost as a duo to Razor Ramon in a handicap match at In Your House 1. On April 26, 1995, the Intercontinental Championship was declared vacant after a controversial ending to a match between Jarrett and Bob Holly. They had a rematch later that evening where Jarrett reclaimed the title. On May 19, Razor Ramon regained the title from Jarrett in Montreal, Quebec, but Jarrett won it back two nights later in Trois-Rivières, Quebec, making him a three-time Intercontinental Champion.

At In Your House 2: The Lumberjacks on July 23, 1995, Jarrett performed the song "With My Baby Tonight". Later that evening, Jarrett lost the Intercontinental Championship to Shawn Michaels. Following the event, Jarrett left the WWF for five months and returned to the USWA. Jarrett returned to the WWF at In Your House 5 on December 17, 1995, feuding with Ahmed Johnson. Jarrett lost to Johnson by disqualification at the 1996 Royal Rumble and left the WWF shortly thereafter due to a contract dispute. Later that year, The Roadie revealed that he had in fact sung "With My Baby Tonight" and that Jarrett had been lip synching.

=== United States Wrestling Association (1996) ===
After leaving the WWF in February 1996, Jarrett returned to the United States Wrestling Association in Memphis. He won the USWA Unified World Heavyweight Championship for the third time defeating Jerry Lawler on April 20. He dropped the title back to Lawler in August and left the USWA before the promotion folded in November 1997.

=== World Championship Wrestling (1996–1997) ===
In October 1996, Jarrett was hired by World Championship Wrestling (WCW), signing a one-year contract. Upon debuting in WCW, Jarrett became a "free agent" in the rivalry between The Four Horsemen and the New World Order (nWo). After defeating Chris Benoit at Starrcade, and Steve McMichael at SuperBrawl VII, both by cheating when the referee was distracted, Jarrett was reluctantly inducted into the Four Horsemen. On June 9, 1997, Jarrett defeated Dean Malenko to win the WCW United States Heavyweight Championship.

In mid-1997, Jarrett was kicked out of the Four Horsemen and began feuding with Horsemen member Steve McMichael. Despite aligning himself with McMichael's then-wife, Debra McMichael, Jarrett lost the United States Heavyweight Championship to McMichael on August 21. In October, Jarrett's contract expired and he opted to return to the WWF, despite the dominance of WCW in the ongoing "Monday Night War".

=== Return to WWF (1997–1999) ===
==== National Wrestling Alliance invasion (1997–1998) ====
Jarrett returned to the WWF on the October 20, 1997, episode of Raw is War, delivering a worked shoot speech in which he criticized both WCW President Eric Bischoff and WWF Chairman Vince McMahon. After briefly feuding with The Undertaker, Jarrett defeated Barry Windham to win the vacant NWA North American Heavyweight Championship. In early 1998, Jarrett joined forces with Jim Cornette and his stable of "invading" National Wrestling Alliance wrestlers, and began defending the North American Heavyweight Championship on WWF television. In March, Jarrett left Cornette's stable, and Cornette stripped him of the title and awarded it to Windham.

==== Teaming with Owen Hart (1998–1999) ====
On the March 2, 1998, episode of Monday Night Raw, Jarrett reprised his country music singer gimmick, introducing Tennessee Lee as his new manager. At Unforgiven: In Your House on April 26, 1998, Jarrett once again sang alongside Sawyer Brown with their hit single, "Some Girls Do". On the June 1, 1998, edition of Raw, Tennessee Lee introduced Southern Justice as Jarrett's new bodyguards. Jarrett grew a goatee at that time. On the August 9, 1998, edition of Sunday Night Heat, Jarrett fired Tennessee Lee after he had inadvertently cost Jarrett multiple matches in the preceding weeks. Jarrett and Southern Justice then began feuding with D-Generation X (DX), with Jarrett losing to DX member X-Pac in a hair vs. hair match at SummerSlam. Jarrett's long hair was subsequently cut short by DX and Howard Finkel, who had himself been shaved bald by Jarrett and Southern Justice shortly before SummerSlam. Jarrett and Southern Justice were defeated by DX at Breakdown: In Your House in September, and the trio separated shortly thereafter.

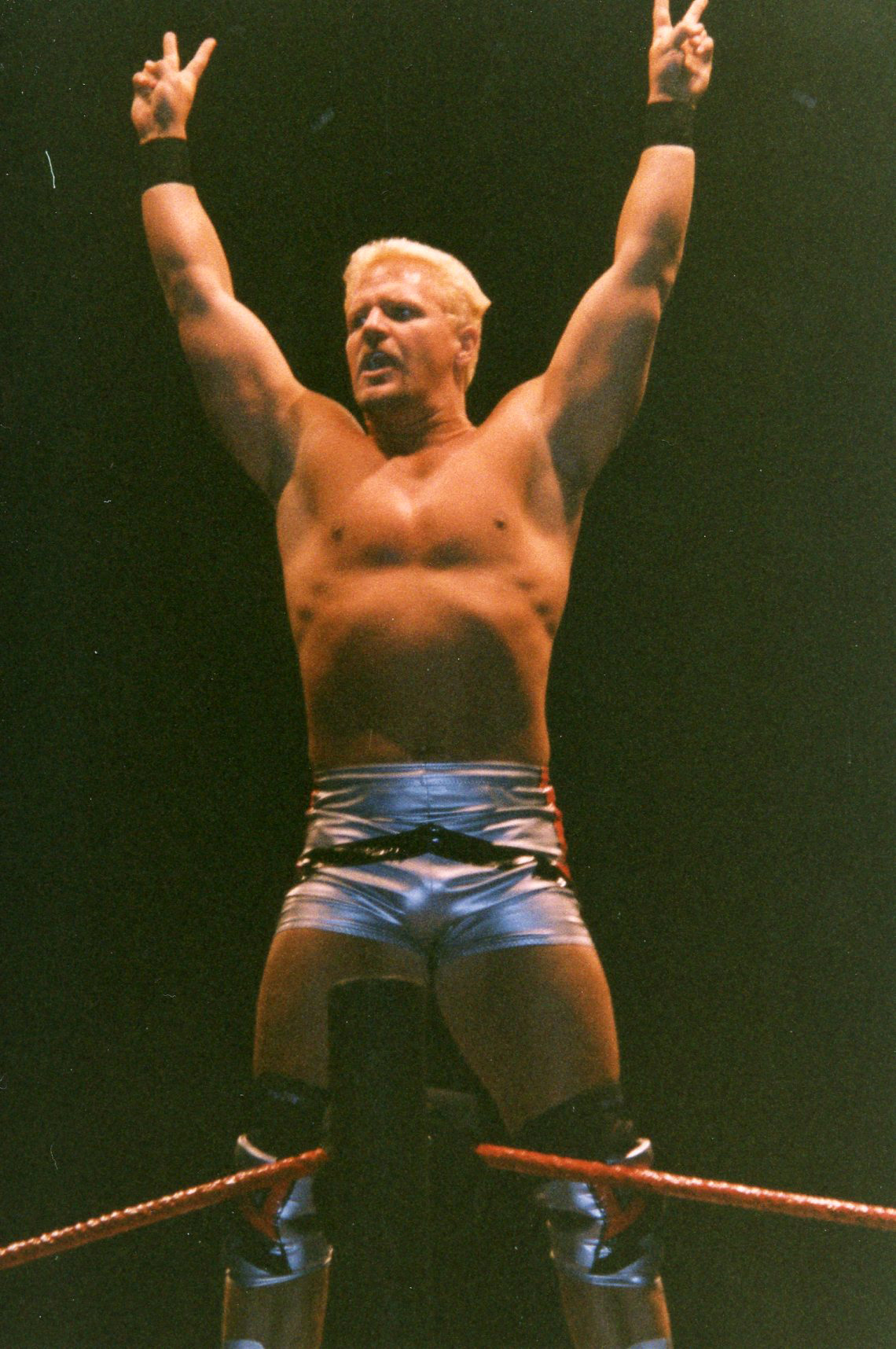
Jarrett posing in 1999

Jarrett briefly feuded with Al Snow before reuniting with Debra, who had left WCW for the WWF, and forming a tag team with Owen Hart. Hart and Jarrett were close friends and travel partners for years, so the team jelled almost immediately. Jarrett and Hart won the WWF Tag Team Championship from Ken Shamrock and Big Boss Man, successfully defending the titles at WrestleMania XV before losing to Kane and X-Pac on an episode of Raw. Eight days after Hart died in a stunt that went wrong at Over the Edge, Jarrett defeated The Godfather, who Owen was scheduled to face at the pay-per-view, for the Intercontinental Championship. As he was handed the title belt, he yelled Hart's name in tribute to his friend. In mid-1999, Jarrett exchanged the Intercontinental Championship with Edge and D'Lo Brown on two more occasions. His fifth reign broke Razor Ramon's record from 1995. He held the record until Chris Jericho's seventh reign in 2004.

In the months that followed, Jarrett became increasingly abusive towards Debra. At SummerSlam, Jarrett challenged D'Lo Brown for both the WWF European Championship and WWF Intercontinental Championships, with Debra accompanying Brown to the ring following an argument with Jarrett. Brown lost the match after both Mark Henry and Debra turned on him, making Jarrett the second ever "Euro-Continental Champion". On the following episode of Raw, Jarrett rewarded Debra and Henry by giving Debra an assistant, Miss Kitty, and Henry the European Championship. In late 1999, Jarrett began feuding with Chyna over the Intercontinental Championship. Over the course of the feud, Jarrett would develop a misogynistic character, attacking numerous women such as Jacqueline, Stephanie McMahon and Cindy Margolis, while insinuating women like Chyna "had no business being in a wrestling ring, and should be cooking, cleaning and making babies". He would attack Chyna with frying pans and even dump her in a laundry basket. Jarrett eventually abandoned Debra in favor of Miss Kitty after he and Debra were defeated by Stephanie McMahon and Test in a mixed tag team match. He later also turned on Miss Kitty after she lost a match that Jarrett had inserted her into in his place.

Jarrett left the WWF in October 1999, right after WWF head writer Vince Russo resigned from the WWF in order to join WCW. Jarrett's contract expired on October 16, 1999, one day before his scheduled match with Chyna at No Mercy. Jarrett wrestled at No Mercy nonetheless, losing the Intercontinental Championship to Chyna. Chyna later alleged that Jarrett and Russo had colluded in order to delay Jarrett's title defense until after Jarrett's contract had expired, and that Jarrett had subsequently made a deal with WWF Chairman Vince McMahon for $200,000 (equivalent to $387,000 in 2025) in order to wrestle at No Mercy without a contract. In 2006, Jarrett asserted that he had been paid only what he was owed by the WWF. In a 2008 interview for a TNA special, Jarrett stated that not only were his negotiations cordial and in good faith, but that he also got stock options in WWF's initial public offering, which occurred two days after he left.

=== Return to WCW (1999–2001) ===
==== nWo 2000 (1999–2000) ====
Jarrett returned to WCW on the October 18, 1999, episode of WCW Monday Nitro, attacking Buff Bagwell and proclaiming himself the "Chosen One" of WCW. Jarrett took part in a tournament for the vacant WCW World Heavyweight Championship, winning his first three matches with the assistance of Creative Control. At Mayhem on November 21, he was eliminated from the tournament after losing his semi-final match to Chris Benoit following interference from Dustin Rhodes. At Starrcade on December 19, Jarrett defeated Rhodes in a Bunkhouse Brawl, then unsuccessfully challenged Benoit for the United States Heavyweight Championship in a ladder match. On the following episode of Nitro, Jarrett defeated Benoit in a rematch, winning the belt. In the same evening, Jarrett reformed the nWo with WCW World Heavyweight Champion Bret Hart and the reigning WCW World Tag Team Champions, Kevin Nash and Scott Hall, with the foursome calling themselves "nWo 2000".

In early 2000, Jarrett feuded with WCW Commissioner Terry Funk, who forced him to wrestle three veterans – George Steele, Tito Santana, and Jimmy Snuka – in one night. Jarrett was stripped of the United States Heavyweight Championship after suffering a concussion during his bout with Snuka, but the title was returned to him by Nash after he became WCW Commissioner. In order to help him retain the title, Jarrett drafted the Harris Brothers (formerly Creative Control) into nWo 2000. In the following months, Jarrett repeatedly challenged Sid Vicious for the WCW World Heavyweight Championship, in the process clashing with Nash and winning the position of WCW Commissioner for himself. Following Bret Hart's retirement, the nWo disbanded.

==== WCW World Heavyweight Champion (2000–2001) ====
In April, WCW was rebooted by Eric Bischoff and Vince Russo, with all titles vacated as a result. Bischoff and Russo also created The New Blood, a stable of younger wrestlers who feuded with The Millionaire's Club, made up of the older members of the WCW roster. Jarrett joined The New Blood, and at Spring Stampede on April 16, he defeated Millionaires Club member Diamond Dallas Page to win the vacant WCW World Heavyweight Championship. Page regained the title on April 24, and on April 25, the title was contested in a tag team match pitting Jarrett and Bischoff against Page and actor David Arquette. Arquette won the WCW World Heavyweight Championship after pinning Bischoff. Jarrett hit Page with the championship belt while special referee Kimberly Page's back was turned; WCW official Mickie Jay counted Bischoff out while Jarrett had Page pinned, who kicked out. At Slamboree on May 7, Jarrett defeated Page and Arquette in a three-way triple cage match to win his second WCW World Heavyweight Championship after Arquette turned on Page.

In May, Jarrett won and lost the WCW World Heavyweight Championship on two further occasions, regaining the title from Ric Flair both times. Jarrett feuded with Nash and Hollywood Hogan throughout June 2000, and on July 9 at Bash at the Beach, he faced Hogan with the WCW World Heavyweight Championship on the line; the match ended swiftly after Jarrett immediately lay down, allowing Hogan to rest a boot on his chest and win the title, with Hogan commenting, "That's why this company is in the damn shape it's in—because of bullshit like this!". Vince Russo subsequently came to the ring and delivered a profanity-laced statement, in which he accused Hogan of politicking and claimed that Hogan had used his creative control to refuse to lose to Jarrett. Russo then stated that, while Hogan was free to keep the title belt he had just won (the "Hulk Hogan Memorial Belt"), Jarrett would wrestle Booker T for the official WCW World Heavyweight Championship later that night. Booker T won the match and Hogan did not appear in WCW again. It is disputed whether the situation was a shoot, a work, or some combination of the two.

In the following months, Jarrett briefly feuded with Booker T, Mike Awesome, Sting, Buff Bagwell, and Flair. In late 2000, he joined forces with the Harris Brothers once more, with the trio defeating The Filthy Animals at Starrcade on December 17. In the same evening, Jarrett aligned himself with WCW World Heavyweight Champion Scott Steiner by helping Steiner defeat Sid Vicious.

In 2001, Jarrett and Steiner became members of The Magnificent Seven, a large stable headed by Flair. Flair and Jarrett feuded with Dusty and Dustin Rhodes until March, when WCW was purchased by the WWF.

Uninterested in Jarrett, the WWF neglected to acquire his contract, leaving him without a job. On the March 26 episode of the WWF's Raw program (which coincided with the final episode of Nitro), WWF owner Vince McMahon was seen watching Jarrett within the WCW venue on a television set. Mocking Jarrett's trademark of distinctly spelling out his name, McMahon stated that Jarrett would be "Capital G, Double-O, Double-N, Double-E – GOONNEE!"

=== World Wrestling All-Stars (2001–2003) ===
With both WCW and the WWF now ruled out as employment options, Jarrett resurfaced in World Wrestling All-Stars (WWA) in late 2001, wrestling throughout Australia and Europe. Jarrett won the WWA World Heavyweight Championship, but was later stripped of the title. Jarrett returned to the WWA during his first NWA World Heavyweight Championship reign; he defeated Sting for the WWA World Heavyweight Championship at the last WWA event on May 25, 2003, unifying the two titles.

=== NWA Total Nonstop Action / Total Nonstop Action Wrestling (2002–2014) ===
==== NWA World Heavyweight Champion (2002–2006) ====
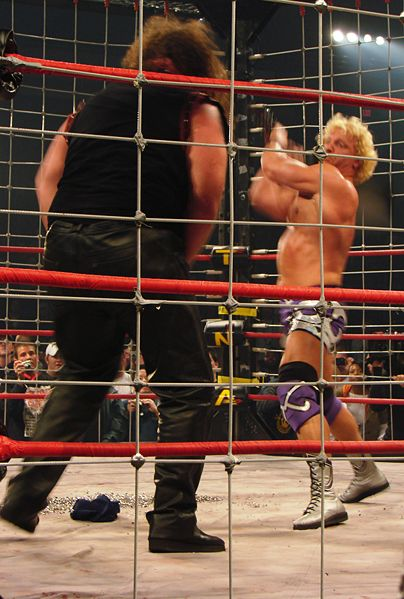
Jarrett hitting Abyss with a thumbtack-filled guitar during the Lethal Lockdown match at the April 15, 2007, Lockdown pay-per-view

In June 2002, Jeff Jarrett and his father, Jerry, established the professional wrestling promotion Total Nonstop Action Wrestling (TNA) under the legal entity J Sports and Entertainment. TNA initially aired weekly pay-per-view events, beginning on June 19, 2002.

At TNA's debut pay-per-view, Jarrett competed in a Gauntlet for the Gold match to determine the new NWA World Heavyweight Champion, but was eliminated by guest entrant Toby Keith. In the months that followed, Jarrett engaged in feuds with Scott Hall, Brian Lawler, and B.G. James. On November 20, 2002, he won the NWA World Heavyweight Championship by defeating Ron Killings, with interference from Vince Russo. Jarrett later refused to join Russo's Sports Entertainment Xtreme (S.E.X.) faction, leading to a storyline conflict involving members of the group, including the debuting Raven. The rivalry continued until Russo's departure from the stable in early 2003.

Jarrett lost the title on June 11, 2003, in a three-way match against Raven and A.J. Styles, who pinned Jarrett following interference from Russo. He regained the championship on October 22, 2003, turning heel in the process. His second reign ended on April 21, 2004, when Styles defeated him in a steel cage match after being named the replacement for an injured Chris Harris. Jarrett retaliated by interfering in a subsequent title match, helping Ron Killings defeat Styles. On June 2, 2004, Jarrett won his third NWA World Heavyweight Championship by defeating Killings, Styles, Raven, and Harris in TNA's inaugural King of the Mountain match.

In early 2005, Jarrett formed the heel stable Planet Jarrett, which included Monty Brown, Kip James, and later Rhino. The group served as a central faction in TNA storylines, with Jarrett referring to the promotion itself as “Planet Jarrett” to emphasize his influence. On April 3, 2005, Jarrett defended the championship in the International Wrestling Association (IWA) in Puerto Rico against Ray González. Although González won the match, the title change was not recognized by TNA or the NWA, and Jarrett continued to be acknowledged as champion. He dropped the title to A.J. Styles at Hard Justice on May 15, 2005.

Jarrett captured the title for a fourth time on September 15, 2005, defeating Raven at a Border City Wrestling (BCW) event. He lost the championship to Rhino at Bound for Glory on October 23, but regained it on the November 3 episode of Impact!, beginning his fifth reign. That title run ended at Against All Odds on February 12, 2006, when he was defeated by Christian Cage.

Following the loss, Jarrett began a feud with Sting, who portrayed Jarrett as a corrupting force within TNA. The storyline led to the debut of Scott Steiner, who aligned with Jarrett. At Slammiversary on June 18, Jarrett won his sixth NWA World Heavyweight Championship in a King of the Mountain match. He retained the title against Sting at Hard Justice, aided by a heel turn from Cage, who struck Sting with Jarrett's guitar. Subsequently, TNA management figure Jim Cornette ordered Jarrett to face Samoa Joe at No Surrender in a lumberjack match, which Joe won.

Jarrett's final NWA World Heavyweight Championship reign concluded at Bound for Glory on October 22, 2006, where Sting forced him to submit, ending their months-long rivalry.

==== Various feuds (2006–2010) ====
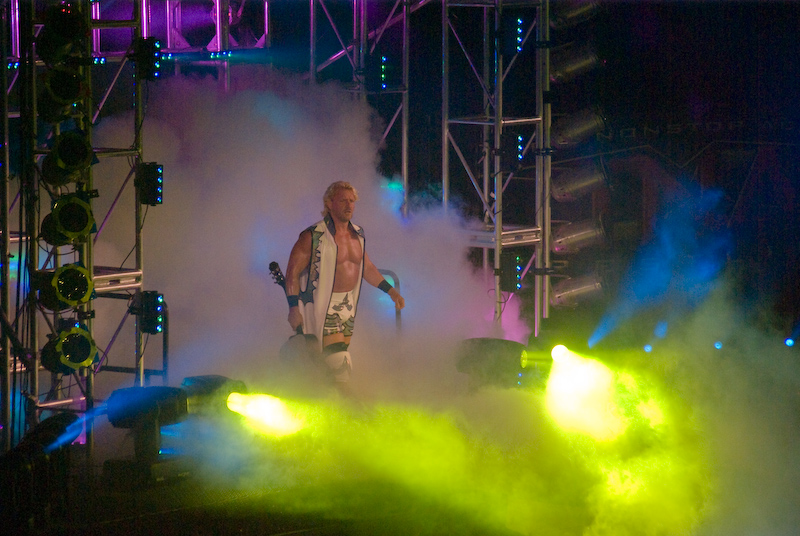
Jarrett making his return at Bound for Glory IV in 2008

On the following episode of Impact!, Jarrett announced in an interview that he was leaving TNA indefinitely. For the following six months, Jarrett did not appear on TNA television, instead focusing on his role as Vice President of TNA Entertainment. Jarrett, however, temporarily returned to TNA television on the April 12, 2007, episode of Impact!, and aligned himself with Samoa Joe, by helping him defeat A.J. Styles, turning face. On April 15 at Lockdown, Jarrett, making his in-ring return, and the rest of Team Angle defeated Team Cage in a Lethal Lockdown match. The following episode of Impact!, he delivered his first promo in months, stating it's not all about Jeff Jarrett and he returned to give back to the wrestlers and fans, officially completing his face turn. He then entered into a feud with Robert Roode, losing a match to him at Sacrifice on May 13. Jarrett was then scheduled to take on Styles with the winner to earn a spot in the King of the Mountain match at Slammiversary on June 17 but could not compete due to "personal issues". In 2008, Jarrett was featured in the promotion of TNA's "Maximum Impact!" tour of the United Kingdom.

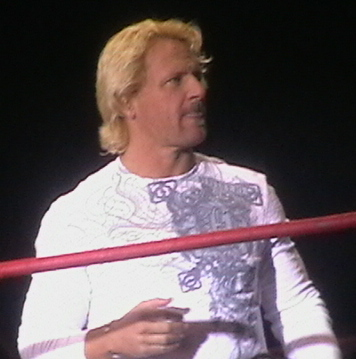
Jarrett at a house show in Dublin during TNA's "Maximum Impact!" tour of the United Kingdom and Ireland in January 2009

After Jarrett's return on the September 11 episode of Impact!, he feuded with Kurt Angle when, at No Surrender, he would help Samoa Joe defeat Kurt Angle and Christian Cage. At Bound for Glory IV, Jeff defeated Angle in a singles match with Mick Foley as the special enforcer. The feud got even more personal when it started involving Jarrett's three daughters. At Genesis, Jarrett lost to Angle. At Lockdown on April 19, Jarrett captained a team against Angle's team in Lethal Lockdown which his team won.

Jarrett would then enter a feud with Mick Foley. The two would meet in a four-way match at Sacrifice on May 24 and during a King of the Mountain match at Slammiversary. Shortly after Slammiversary, Jarrett once again disappeared from TNA programming. On the December 3 episode of Impact!, Jarrett made his first appearance in months via telephone. When he returned, Jarrett feuded with Hulk Hogan, who told Jeff he had to earn his spot in TNA. He was defeated by Mr. Anderson. This started an angle of Hogan's business partner Eric Bischoff, having Jarrett work humiliating jobs backstage at the Impact! Zone, such as flipping burgers and cleaning restrooms, while also booking him in unfavorable matches, such as surprise Falls Count Anywhere and handicap matches.

On the March 22 episode of Impact!, after Jarrett broke a guitar over Bischoff's head, Bischoff placed him and Mick Foley, another wrestler he had had problems with, against each other in a No Disqualification match, where the loser would get fired from TNA. Jarrett won the match, refereed by Beer Money, Inc., and with Foley fired from TNA, Hogan ordered Bischoff to lay off of Jarrett. At Lockdown on April 18, Team Hogan (Abyss, Jarrett, Rob Van Dam and Jeff Hardy) defeated Team Flair (Sting, Desmond Wolfe, Robert Roode and James Storm), when Bischoff turned face and helped Team Hogan pick up the victory, effectively ending his feud with Jarrett. Just before Lockdown, Jarrett said that he was going to find out the answers to Sting's behavior, which led into a brawl on Impact!, with Sting leaving a beaten Jarrett in the ring, which in turn led to their match at Sacrifice on May 16. At Sacrifice, Sting assaulted Jarrett prior to their match and then dragged him in to the ring, where he scored a pinfall in seconds over a bloodied Jarrett.

Jarrett was sidelined for a month before making his return at Slammiversary VIII on June 13, where he cost Sting his TNA World Heavyweight Championship match against Rob Van Dam. On the June 24 episode of Impact!, Sting assaulted Jarrett to the point that TNA president Dixie Carter suspended him for 30 days without pay the following week. During Sting's suspension, Jarrett found a new enemy in Kevin Nash, who claimed that Jarrett himself, and not Sting, was what was wrong with TNA. Sting returned from his suspension on the August 5 episode of Impact!, wearing a new red face paint, and, together with Nash, beat down Jarrett, Bischoff and Hogan. On the August 26 episode of Impact!, Jarrett attempted to recruit Samoa Joe to help him against Nash and Sting, but was turned down. Thus Jarrett was left alone for a match, where he was defeated by Nash, after an interference from Sting. The following week, Sting defeated Jarrett in a singles match, after an interference from Kevin Nash. After the match, Samoa Joe joined Jarrett and drove Sting and Nash away. At No Surrender on September 5, Jarrett and Joe defeated Sting and Nash in a tag team match, after Jarrett hit Sting with his own baseball bat.

==== Immortal and feud with Kurt Angle (2010–2011) ====
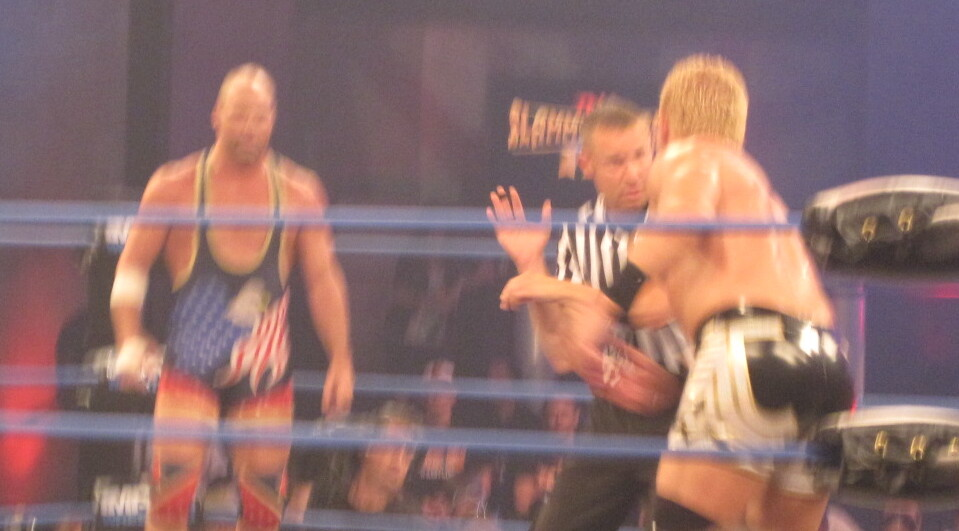
Jarrett (right) and Kurt Angle at Slammiversary IX

At Bound for Glory on October 10, Jarrett and Joe faced Sting, Nash and D'Angelo Dinero in a two-on-three handicap match; at the end of the match, Jarrett abandoned Joe and left Joe behind to be pinned by Nash, thus Jarrett turned heel and joining the stable Immortal. Jarrett then defeated Joe at Turning Point on November 7, and at Final Resolution on December 5. On the January 6, 2011, episode of Impact!, Angle interrupted Jarrett's $100,000 mixed martial arts (MMA) challenge and signed a contract to face him at Genesis on January 9 in an MMA exhibition match, since he had promised not to wrestle again. The match was thrown out in the third round after Jarrett blinded Angle; after the match, Jarrett bloodied Angle, before announcing that he was ending his mixed martial arts career and promised that his current (and Angle's former) wife, Karen Jarrett, would be joining the retirement party.

On the January 13 episode of Impact!, Karen made her return and stopped Angle just as he was about to attack Jarrett, telling him that she would not allow him to ruin their personal lives and promised to tell all about their divorce the following week. The following week, Karen slapped Angle, providing a distraction which allowed Jarrett to beat him down. On February 13 at Against All Odds, Jarrett defeated Angle in a singles match and as a result Angle was forced to walk Karen down the aisle, when she and Jarrett renewed their wedding vows on the March 3 edition of Impact!. On March 3, Angle proceeded to destroy the wedding set with an axe and forced wedding guest, New York Jet Bart Scott to tap out with the ankle lock.

On April 17 at Lockdown, Jarrett defeated Angle in an "Ultra Male Rules" two-out-of-three Falls steel cage match, with help from Karen. It was later reported that Jarrett had severely bruised his ribs in the match. On the May 12 episode of Impact Wrestling, Angle revealed a name from Jarrett's past, Chyna, as his backup in taking care of him and Karen. At Sacrifice on May 15, Angle and Chyna defeated the Jarretts in a mixed tag team match. With Karen out of the picture, Angle defeated Jarrett on June 12 at Slammiversary IX in what was billed as the "final battle" between the two. However, on the following episode of Impact Wrestling, Jarrett challenged Angle to a Parking Lot Brawl and agreed to sign a contract that would force him to move to Mexico without Angle's children; Angle ended up winning the fight after choking Jarrett with a shirt, forcing him to say "adiós", thus ending the long feud in the process. The following week on Impact Wrestling, Bischoff forced Jarrett to obey the match stipulations and exiled him to Mexico.

==== Backstage roles and departure (2011–2014) ====
Jarrett returned to TNA on the July 14 episode of Impact Wrestling, showing off the "Mexican Heavyweight Championship" belt, playing off the AAA Mega Championship he had won during his stay in Mexico. In October, Jarrett began feuding with the returning Jeff Hardy. On November 13 at Turning Point, Jarrett lost to Hardy three times in a row, first in six seconds, then in six minutes and finally in ten seconds. On December 11 at Final Resolution, Jarrett was defeated by Hardy in a steel cage match. As per stipulation of the match, Jarrett was, in storyline, fired from TNA on the following episode of Impact Wrestling. In reality, he was written off television to oversee Ring Ka King, a new promotion based in India that is a subsidiary of TNA.

=== Lucha Libre AAA Worldwide (2004–2006) ===
Jarrett made his debut for Mexican promotion Lucha Libre AAA Worldwide on March 21, 2004, defeating Latin Lover to win the 2004 Rey de Reyes tournament. Over the next two years, Jarrett would make several sporadic appearances for AAA as a member of the heel stable La Legión Extranjera, before the working relationship between AAA and TNA was ended.

=== International Wrestling Association (2004–2005) ===
In 2004, the International Wrestling Association (IWA) ran an angle that satirized its main competition, the World Wrestling Council (WWC), by having a heel stable led by Ray González adopt its former name of "Capitol Sports" during an invasion angle. On October 9, 2004, González announced that Capitol had formed an alliance with TNA for Golpe de Estado and that this move would bring in Jarrett, then the NWA World Heavyweight Champion, Robert Roode, Konnan and Shawn Hernandez to compete on its behalf. At Golpe de Estado, Jarrett defeated Shane Sewell to retain the NWA title and help the heels gain an advantage in the series. However, González lost with Capitol and IWA tied, ending the angle. Following a face turn, González's association with Jarrett soon concluded, leading to a feud between them. This angle concluded on April 3, 2005, when González defeated Jarrett in a titular contest to win the NWA World Heavyweight Championship. However, his reign was short, being stripped on the same event and at the time the title change was unrecognized by the NWA, with Jarrett returning to TNA with the belt. Starting in 2015, the NWA recognizes Gonzalez's championship reign.

=== Return to AAA (2011–2015) ===
In February 2010, TNA restarted their working relationship with AAA and in early May 2011, Jarrett made his return to AAA television, announcing his and TNA's alignment with Dorian Roldán and his heel stable La Sociedad and their participation in Triplemanía XIX. At Triplemanía XIX, Jarrett defeated El Zorro to become the new AAA Mega Champion. On July 31 at Verano de Escándalo, Jarrett successfully defended the title in a three-way elimination match against Dr. Wagner, Jr. and L.A. Park. Jarrett returned to AAA on March 18, 2012, at Rey de Reyes, where he lost the title to El Mesías, ending his reign at 274 days, which was at the time the longest reign in the title's history. On August 5 at Triplemanía XX, Jarrett teamed up with the debuting Kurt Angle as Team Dorian Roldán in a hair vs. hair match, where they faced Team Joaquín Roldán (L.A. Park and Electroshock), with the Roldáns' hair on the line. Electroshock won the match for his team by pinning Angle, forcing Dorian to have his head shaved bald. However, after the match, the La Sociedad members overpowered the winners and shaved Joaquín bald. Jarrett made a surprise return on December 2 at Guerra de Titanes, hitting L.A. Park with a guitar, after he had escaped a six-way steel cage Lucha de Apuestas.

Jarrett's next AAA appearance took place on June 16, 2013, at Triplemanía XXI, where he, Matt Morgan and Monster Pain defeated AAA World Trios Champions Los Psycho Circus (Monster Clown, Murder Clown and Psycho Clown) in a non-title match. On December 8 at Guerra de Titanes, Jarrett was pinned by El Mesías in an eight-man tag team main event, where he, Daga, La Parka Negra and Psicosis were defeated by El Mesías, Cibernético, El Hijo del Perro Aguayo and La Parka. Post-match, Jarrett took part in the reformation of La Sociedad.

On March 16, 2014, at Rey de Reyes, Jarrett represented La Sociedad in a six-man tag team match, where he, Máscara Año 2000 Jr. and El Texano Jr. faced Cibernético, Electroshock and Psycho Clown. At the end of the match, AAA president Joaquín Roldán hit Jarrett with his own guitar, after which he was pinned by Cibernético. Jarrett was defeated in similar fashion by Electroshock in another six-man tag team match on June 27, after which he was challenged to a Hair vs. Hair match.)

=== Global Force Wrestling (2014–2017) ===
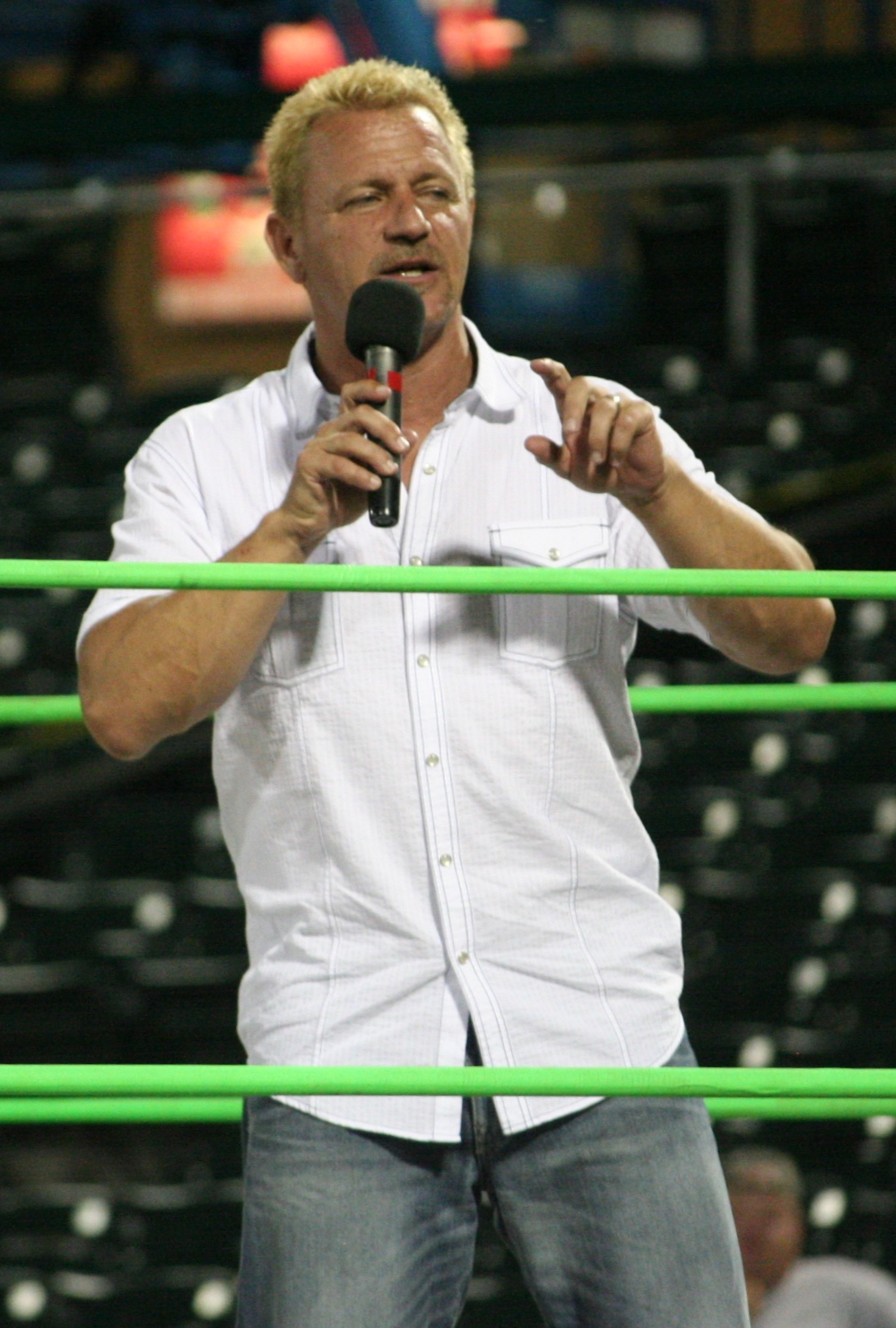
Jarrett at a Global Force Wrestling show in June 2015

When Jarrett left TNA, he created Global Force Wrestling. On June 21, 2014, it was announced GFW had inked a working agreement with New Japan Pro-Wrestling (NJPW) On August 10, Jarrett made an appearance for NJPW to officially sign the agreement. Later in the event, he joined the villainous Bullet Club stable. Jarrett managed the IWGP Champion AJ Styles at King of Pro-Wrestling, Power Struggle, and wrestled a six-man tag team match at Wrestle Kingdom 9 in Tokyo Dome, where he and his Bullet Club stablemates Bad Luck Fale and Yujiro Takahashi were defeated by Hiroyoshi Tenzan, Satoshi Kojima and Tomoaki Honma.

On May 24, 2015, Jarrett appeared at AAA's Lucha Libre World Cup event on behalf of GFW, providing English commentary for the semi-final matches of the event and scouting talent for the upcoming GFW events. The next month, in June, Jeff and Karen Jarrett returned to TNA, winning the TNA King of the Mountain Championship at Slammiversary XIII. Jarrett vacated the title when he was appointed Impact Wrestling's new authority figure. Jarrett feuded with Carter over the control of TNA. It was later reported that Jarrett had sold his minority stake to Panda Energy. On the September 16 edition of Impact Wrestling, Team TNA (Galloway, Lashley, Eddie Edwards, Bram and Davey Richards) defeated Team GFW (Sonjay Dutt, Jeff Jarrett, Eric Young, Chris Mordetzky and Brian Myers) in a Lethal Lockdown Match, resulting in Dixie gaining possession of Jarrett's TNA stake and, as a result, full control of TNA.

Jarrett made his in-ring debut for the promotion on October 28, 2015, defeating Nathan Cruz as part of the GFW UK Invasion tour. During GFW's return to the UK, Jarrett defeated the likes of Noam Dar, Doug Williams and Pepper Parks from March 2 to 5.

=== Second return to WWE (2018–2021) ===
On February 19, 2018, WWE, formerly the World Wrestling Federation announced that Jarrett would be inducted into the WWE Hall of Fame, Jarrett was inducted on April 6, by his long-time friend Road Dogg. In January 2019, Jarrett was hired by WWE as a backstage producer. He appeared as a surprise second entrant in the Royal Rumble match, where he was eliminated by Elias, defeating him in Jarrett's first singles match in 19 years the following night on Raw. In March 2019, it was reported that Jarrett was promoted to a full-time member of the creative team. On July 30, 2021, it was reported that Jarrett had quietly departed from WWE in January.

=== Second return to AAA (2018, 2022) ===
On June 3, 2018, Jarrett made a surprise second return to AAA at Verano de Escándalo where he unmasked himself as the new leader of the MAD heel stable and inserted himself into the events Rey Wagner vs. Rey Mysterio Jr. main event for the AAA Mega Championship, making it a three-way match. Jarrett would win the match and become the AAA Mega Champion for the second time after Konnan returned to AAA during the match as an imposter masked La Parka with referee attire on, revealing upon unmasking after the match that he was associated with MAD and aided Jarrett in winning the title by counting the pinfall. On July 13 in Querétaro, Jarrett teamed with El Hijo del Fantasma defeating Psycho Clown and Pagano. On August 25, at Triplemanía XXVI, Jarrett lost the Mega title to Fénix in a four-way match, which also involved Brian Cage and Rich Swann. at Héroes Inmortales XII, Jarrett lost to Rey Wagner in a Lucha de Apuestas hair vs. hair match. at Rey de Reyes, Jarrett, Killer Kross and La Máscara lost to Las Fresas Salvajes (Mamba and Máximo) and Psycho Clown in a Six-man tag team Steel cage match.

On March 31, 2022, Jarrett returned to Lucha Libre AAA Worldwide at their AAA Invades WrestleCon event, where he was revealed as the leader of La Empresa. At Triplemanía XXX on April 30, Jarrett and Rey Escorpión brawled with Latin Lover and Vampiro.

=== Independent circuit (2022) ===
For much of 2022, Jarrett had made multiple appearances throughout various promotions. He then made a surprise appearance for Game Changer Wrestling at the promotion's Die 4 This event on January 1, hitting Effy with his trademark guitar shot, debuting a new persona in the process. He was dubbed "The Last Outlaw." Jarrett dressed in all black attire and debuted a new theme song. On January 15, he appeared at GCW Say You Will, attacking Effy's tag team partner Allie Katch with another guitar shot. Jarrett's attacks set up a match with Effy at the promotion's The Wrld on GCW pay-per-view, which Jarrett won. It was Jarrett's first match since 2019.

Jarrett was named an ambassador on February 11, 2022, for the National Wrestling Alliance's Crockett Cup event, which took place on March 19 and 20, 2022. He was later announced as the special guest referee for the NWA Worlds Heavyweight Championship match between Matt Cardona and Nick Aldis. On July 31 at Ric Flair's Last Match, Jarrett teamed with Jay Lethal in a losing effort against Ric Flair and Andrade El Idolo in Flair's retirement match.

=== Third return to WWE (2022) ===
In May 2022, Jarrett rejoined WWE, as the promotion's Senior Vice President of Live Events. At SummerSlam in July 2022, Jarrett served as a special guest referee for the Undisputed WWE Tag Team Championship match between the Usos and the Street Profits. He departed WWE in August 2022 and was replaced by Road Dogg.

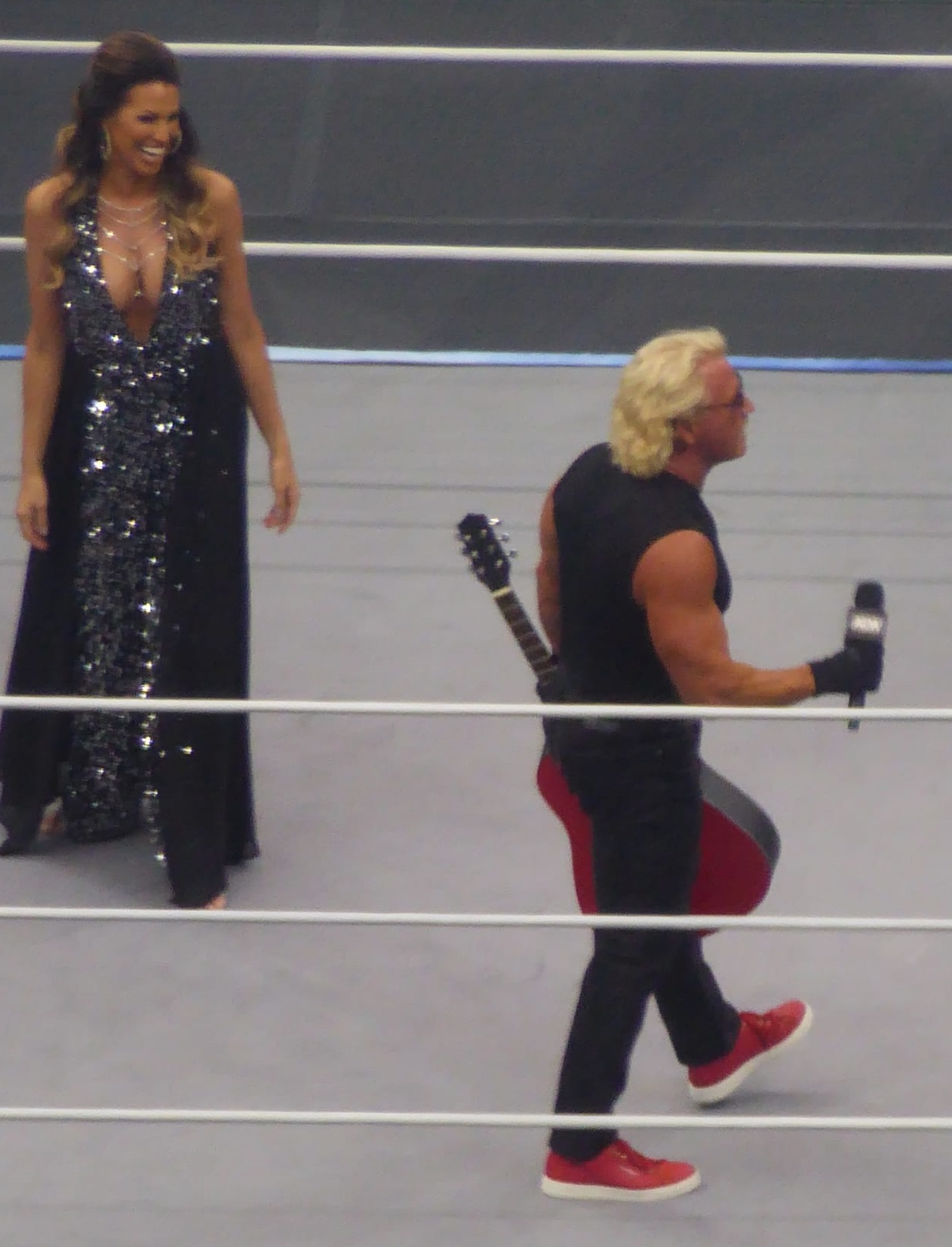
Jeff Jarrett (right) and Karen Jarrett (left) at All In in August 2023.

=== All Elite Wrestling (2022–present) ===
On November 2, 2022, Jarrett made his debut for All Elite Wrestling (AEW) on Dynamite, making his first televised wrestling appearance on TBS in over 21 years since the final episode of WCW Thunder on March 21, 2001. Jarrett aligned himself with "The Lethal Connection" (Jay Lethal, Satnam Singh, Cole Karter, and Sonjay Dutt) after attacking Darby Allin. Jarrett would go on to declare war on the entire AEW roster and fan base. It was subsequently announced by AEW president Tony Khan that Jarrett would serve as AEW's Director of Business Development. On November 19 at Full Gear, Jarrett and Lethal were defeated by Sting and Allin in a no disqualification match.

Throughout 2023, Jarrett and Lethal pursued the AEW World Tag Team Championship, but would fail to capture the titles from The Acclaimed (Anthony Bowens and Max Caster) and FTR (Cash Wheeler and Dax Harwood) in separate feuds. During their feud with FTR, Karen Jarrett would join Jarrett in AEW.

In June 2024, Jarrett announced his entry in the men's bracket of the Owen Hart Cup and turned face by dedicating his run in the tournament to Owen Hart, who Jarrett was real-life friends with before Hart's death. Jarrett was eliminated in the tournament in the first round by the wildcard participant "Hangman" Adam Page. After being eliminated, Jarrett began a feud with Page which culminated in a Lumberjack Strap match at Collision: Grand Slam, where Jarrett was defeated.

In early 2025, Jarrett began a feud with MJF. The feud was abruptly dropped following a negatively received promo segment in which Jarrett, who was portrayed as a babyface, referred to MJF's mother as a "call girl." In January 2026, it was reported that Jarrett was no longer serving in a backstage office role within AEW and had transitioned to a talent-only role. Jarrett has since mainly appeared as a pre-show host for AEW's pay-per-view events.

=== Consejo Mundial de Lucha Libre (2026) ===
On September 18, 2026, Jarrett made his Consejo Mundial de Lucha Libre (CMLL) debut at the 93rd Anniversary Show, losing to Blue Panther.

== Professional wrestling promoter ==
=== Total Nonstop Action Wrestling ===
In June 2002, Jeff Jarrett and his father, Jerry, established the professional wrestling promotion Total Nonstop Action Wrestling (TNA) under the legal entity J Sports and Entertainment. TNA initially aired weekly pay-per-view events, beginning on June 19, 2002. Later, the promotion secured a television deal with Fox Sports Net in 2004 for its weekly program Impact!, and transitioned to a monthly pay-per-view model that November. In October 2005, Impact! moved to Spike TV. While Panda Energy acquired a controlling interest in the company in 2002, Jarrett maintained a minority ownership stake and served as both an in-ring performer and executive. In 2013, Jarrett assumed the backstage role of Executive Vice President of Development/Original Programming. In 2009, it was reported that Jarrett had lost all of his backstage power in TNA and would work only as a wrestler. In 2013, Jarrett and Country star Toby Keith tried to buy TNA; however, when both met Bob Carter, he demanded that his daughter Dixie remain in the company as on-screen President. Jarrett and Keith decided to create their own company. On December 22, 2013, Jarrett resigned from TNA Entertainment. Jarrett remained an investor in TNA Wrestling after his resignation came in effect on January 6, 2014.

=== Ring Ka King ===
In 2011, TNA announced a project in India. The project was revealed to be an original televised wrestling program intended for the Indian market, titled Ring Ka King. The promotion was managed by Jeff Jarrett. Jeremy Borash, Dave Lagana and Sonjay Dutt helped Jarrett with management. A first season was taped in India and featured both Indian and non-Indian wrestlers performing on the show.

=== All Wheels Wrestling ===
In 2011, Jarrett also was part of a TV Pilot called All Wheels Wrestling, a pro wrestling show with motorsports theme which was pitched to Speed Chanel.

=== Global Force Wrestling ===
When Jarrett left TNA, he announced intentions to create a new promotion. Jarrett revealed the promotion's name, Global Force Wrestling (GFW), on April 7, 2014. Since the founding of GFW, Jarrett has represented the organization at TNA, NJPW, and other companies' events.

=== Impact Wrestling ===
On January 5, 2017, it was announced that Jarrett had rejoined TNA, now under the name of Impact Wrestling under the ownership of Anthem Sports & Entertainment. On June 28, it was reported that Impact Wrestling had acquired Global Force Wrestling. On September 5, it was announced that Jarrett would be taking an "indefinite leave of absence" from GFW. On October 23, Impact Wrestling confirmed the termination of its relationship with Jarrett and his company Global Force Entertainment Inc.

Shortly after the Anthem termination of its relationship with Jarrett and his company Global Force Entertainment Inc, Anthem would still continue to use GFW's tape library with them using the shows One Night Only: GFW Amped Anthology and the promotion reverted to the Impact Wrestling name as Jarrett owned the rights to GFW. During the time of the rebranding, the company had been named Impact Wrestling after its flagship program, and had assumed the name of Global Force Wrestling (GFW). The Global Wrestling Network (GWN) name had been influenced by its connection to GFW. In October Impact Wrestling launched the streaming service named Global Wrestling Network despite Jarrett owning the GFW rights. On August 14, 2018, Jarrett and his company Global Force Entertainment announced that it had filed a lawsuit against Impact Wrestling's parent company Anthem Sports & Entertainment in the District Court of Tennessee for copyright infringement over the GFW rights, as Jarrett owned all Global Force Wrestling properties since its creation in 2014. If the lawsuit by Jarrett is successful, Impact would need to immediately suspend the operations of their streaming subscription service under its current name and the company would have to censor the GFW name in their content. A mistrial was declared in July 2020 and the lawsuit was not successful as the belief from the neutral judge was that Jarrett infiltrated the jury. The two sides ultimately agreed to a settlement in January 2021.

=== All Elite Wrestling ===
In November 2022, Jarrett signed with All Elite Wrestling (AEW) as an in-ring talent and as a Director of Business Development. According to Jarrett and Khan, one of Jarrett's responsibilities as Director of Business Development was to help expand AEW's live event schedule and prepare the company to run house shows, and on February 1, 2023, AEW announced they would begin house shows titled AEW House Rules. AEW's first House Rules event took place on March 18 at the Hobart Arena in Troy, Ohio. In January 2026, it was reported that Jarrett was no longer serving in a backstage office role within AEW and had transitioned to a talent-only role.

== Other ventures ==
In a December 2021 news release from the Prospect League, Jarrett was among several members of an ownership group to purchase the Springfield Sliders, a collegiate summer league baseball team based in Springfield, Illinois, temporarily naming it Capital City Baseball until a name was determined.

In February 2022, the ownership group announced the name of the Springfield Lucky Horseshoes after receiving input. Since the announcement, Jarrett has been active in the Springfield area promoting the team, which marked its 14th season in 2022 and the first season since its rebrand.

On March 4, 2025, Jarrett is among the investors of the revived Acclaim Entertainment, a video game publisher that originally existed from 1987 to 2004.

Jarrett was named managing partner of the Nashville Kats arena football team in March 2026.

== Other media ==
Jeff Jarrett

YouTube information
- Channel: My World With Jeff Jarrett
- Years active: 2021–present
- Genre: Podcasting
- Subscribers: 41.1 thousand
- Views: 6.5 million
- Last updated: June 30, 2025

In 1993, Jarrett had a small cameo role in the Michael J. Fox movie Life With Mikey, appearing alongside Jerry Lawler as a wrestler named "Evil Eye".

In 2005, Jarrett made a guest appearance on the comedy show Blue Collar TV.

TNA announced that on April 14, 2009, the first-ever Jarrett DVD release would be a four-disc set, including his best TNA matches and moments, a lengthy and candid interview on his life, career, and TNA Wrestling, rare photos, and guest commentary, among others.

He is a playable character in WCW vs. the World, WWF Attitude, WWF WrestleMania 2000, WCW Backstage Assault, TNA Impact!, and TNA Wrestling Impact!.

In 2018, Jarrett appeared in the music video "Dr. Dare Rides Again" for the pop punk band Send Request.

In May 2021, Jarrett along with co-host Conrad Thompson began the podcast My World with Jeff Jarrett discussing a wide variety of subjects from Jarrett's professional wrestling career.

=== Filmography ===
==== Film ====
Year	Title	Role	Notes
1993	Life with Mikey	Evil Eye	
1999	The Unreal Story of Professional Wrestling	Himself	
2003	Head of State	Wrestler	Uncredited; Stunt wrestler
2009	Larry the Cable Guy's Hula-Palooza Christmas Luau		Wrestling co-ordinator
2012	Spring Breakers	Youth pastor	
2023	The Iron Claw	Jerry Jarrett	Uncredited

==== Television ====
Year	Title	Role	Notes
2005	Blue Collar TV	Himself	2 episodes
2009	Rove Live	Himself	Episode #10.26

==== Video games ====
Year	Title	Role	Notes
1997	WCW vs. the World	Himself	
1999	WWF Attitude	Himself	
2000	WWF WrestleMania 2000	Himself	
2000	WCW Backstage Assault	Himself	
2008	TNA Impact!	Himself	Voice and motion-capture
2011	TNA Wrestling Impact!	Himself	
2023	WrestleQuest		

== Personal life ==
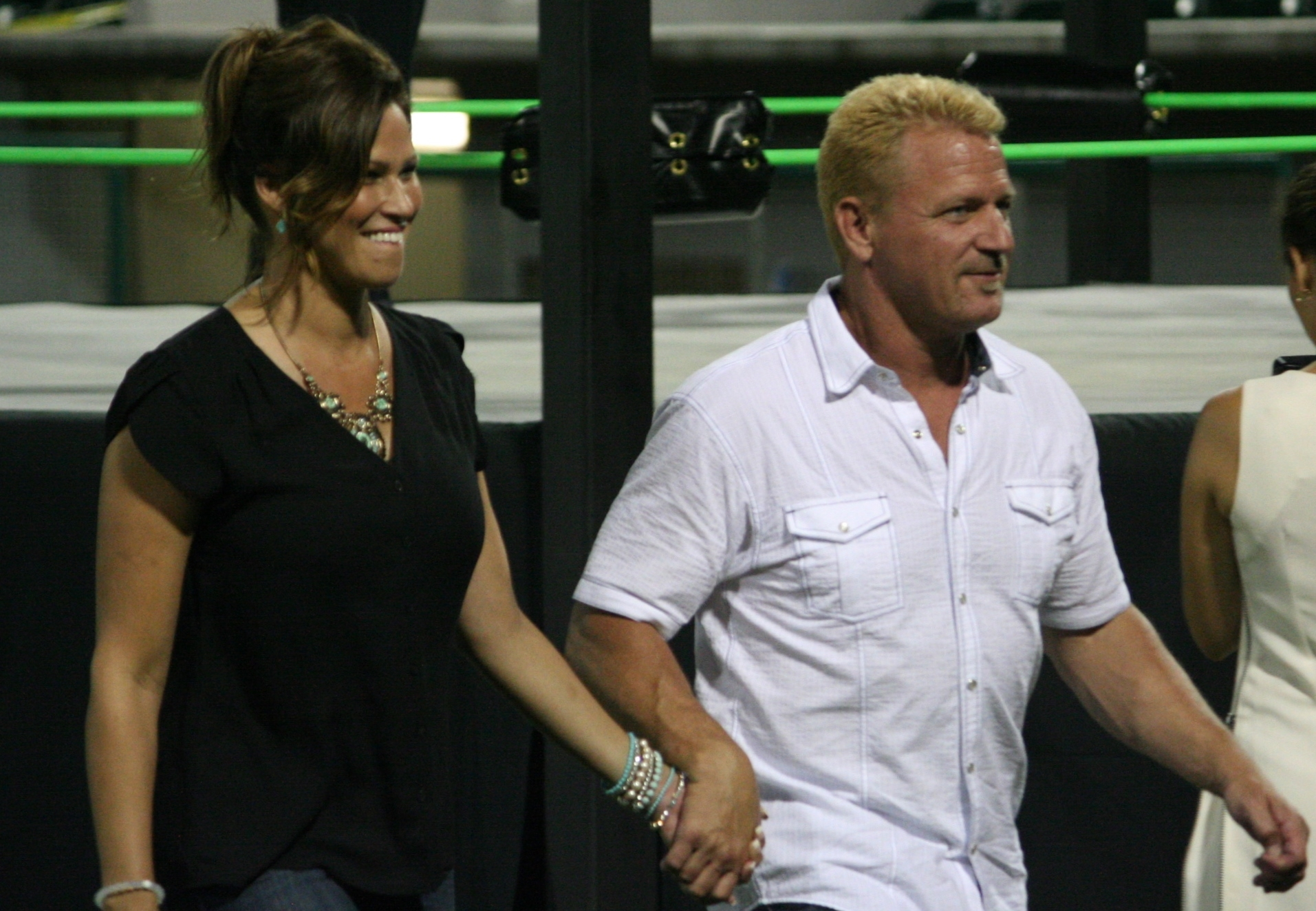
Jeff Jarrett (right) and Karen Jarrett in 2015

Jarrett married his "high school sweetheart" Jill Gregory on November 14, 1992, with whom he had three daughters. Jill died of breast cancer on May 23, 2007. In 2009, it was reported that Jarrett was romantically linked to Karen Angle. This resulted in TNA president Dixie Carter placing Jarrett on a leave of absence. In 2009, Jarrett returned to TNA, using the real-life situation briefly as a storyline. On April 6, 2010, Jarrett and Karen announced their engagement; they were married on August 21, 2010.

Jarrett and his father Jerry reconciled in 2015 after years of estrangement following a falling-out over the business in TNA.

In October 2017, Real Canadian Wrestling promoter Steven Ewaschuk had claimed that Jarrett had shown up to their event late and intoxicated, and then continued drinking until passing out in their locker room prior to his match. Jarrett went on to wrestle the first of his two scheduled matches, but boarded a plane home before the second event. Later that month, Jarrett entered an in-patient rehabilitation facility. The rehab was set up by Karen Jarrett and WWE.

While Jarrett was living in Nashville in the 2000s, he became family friends with Taylor Swift when they were neighbors through mutual friends, with Taylor babysitting for Jarrett's family when he was busy with meetings with TNA. "Taylor would come over and get the girls and take them back to her house and they'd bake cookies and all kind of stuff. One day, Taylor brought over Joe Jonas... Not only is she uber-creative as an artist, she thinks like a businesswoman. Those two skillsets combined, you rarely see. She deserves all the success she has."

== Championships and accomplishments ==
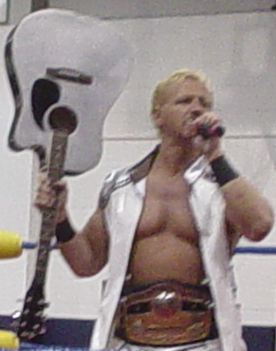
In TNA, Jarrett was a six-time NWA World Heavyweight Champion.

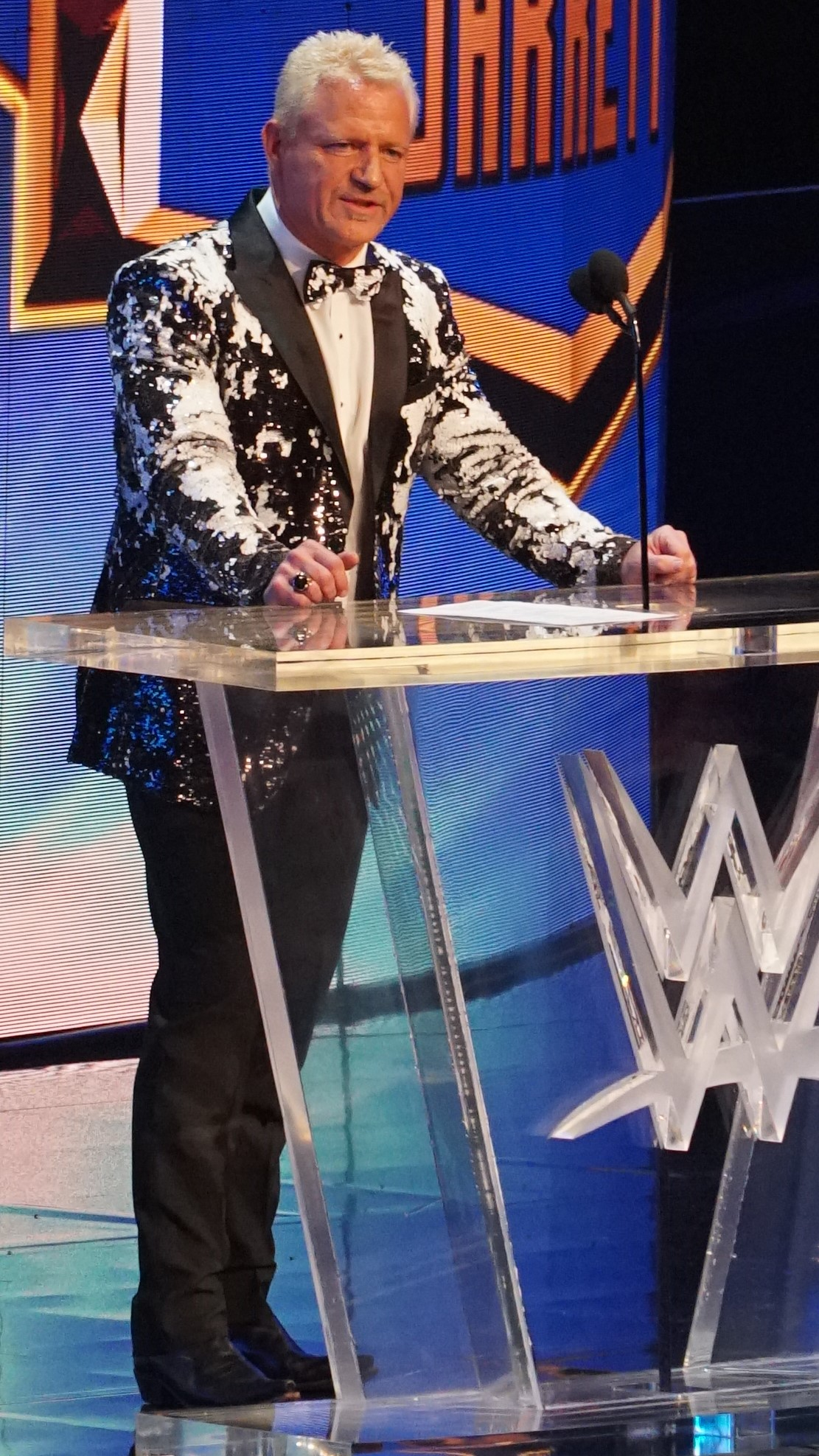
Jarrett was inducted into the WWE Hall of Fame in April 2018.

- All Elite Wrestling
  - Texas Chain Saw Massacre Deathmatch Championship (1 time)
- American Wrestling Association
  - Rookie of the Year (1986)
- Continental Wrestling Association
  - CWA Heavyweight Championship (1 time)
  - NWA Mid-America Heavyweight Championship (5 times)
  - AWA Southern Tag Team Championship (4 times) – with Billy Travis (3) and Pat Tanaka (1)
  - CWA/AWA International Tag Team Championship (2 times) – with Pat Tanaka (1) and Paul Diamond (1)
- European Wrestling Promotion
  - EWP/CWP World Heavyweight Championship (1 time)
- George Tragos/Lou Thesz Professional Wrestling Hall of Fame
  - Frank Gotch Award (2026)
- Lucha Libre AAA World Wide
  - AAA Mega Championship (2 times)
  - AAA Rey de Reyes (2004)^{1}
- NWA Cyberspace
  - NWA Cyberspace Heavyweight Championship (1 time)
- NWA: Total Nonstop Action / Total Nonstop Action Wrestling
  - NWA World Heavyweight Championship (6 times)
  - TNA King of the Mountain Championship (1 time)
  - Gauntlet for the Gold (2004 – Heavyweight)
  - King of the Mountain (2004, 2006, 2015)
  - TNA Hall of Fame (2015)
  - TNA Year End Award (1 time)
    - Memorable Moment of the Year (2003) Jeff Jarrett attacks Hulk Hogan in Japan
- Pennsylvania Championship Wrestling
  - PCW United States Championship (1 time)
- Pro Wrestling Illustrated
  - Feud of the Year (1992) with Jerry Lawler vs. The Moondogs
  - Most Inspirational Wrestler of the Year (2007)
  - Ranked No. 5 of the top 500 singles wrestlers in the PWI 500 in 2000
  - Ranked No. 141 of the top 500 singles wrestlers of the PWI Years in 2003
  - Ranked No. 78 of the Top 100 tag teams of the PWI Years with Jerry Lawler in 2003
- River City Wrestling
  - RCW Championship (1 time)
- United States Wrestling Association
  - USWA Heavyweight Championship (1 time)
  - USWA Southern Heavyweight Championship (9 times)
  - USWA Unified World Heavyweight Championship (3 times)
  - USWA World Tag Team Championship (14 times) – with Matt Borne (2), Jeff Gaylord (2), Cody Michaels (1), Jerry Lawler (4), Robert Fuller (3), and Brian Christopher (2)
- USA Championship Wrestling
  - USA North American Heavyweight Championship (1 time)
- Vendetta Pro Wrestling
  - NWA Western States Heavyweight Championship (1 time)
- World Championship Wrestling
  - WCW World Heavyweight Championship (4 times)
  - WCW United States Heavyweight Championship (3 times)
- World Class Wrestling Association
  - WCWA World Light Heavyweight Championship (2 times)
  - WCWA World Tag Team Championship (3 times) – with Kerry Von Erich (1), Mil Máscaras (1), and Matt Borne (1)
- World Wrestling Federation / WWE
  - NWA North American Championship (1 time)^{2}
  - WWF European Championship (1 time)
  - WWF Intercontinental Championship (6 times)
  - WWF Tag Team Championship (1 time) – with Owen Hart
  - WWE Hall of Fame (Class of 2018)
- World Series Wrestling
  - WSW Heavyweight Championship (1 time)
- World Wrestling All-Stars
  - WWA World Heavyweight Championship (2 times)^{3}
  - Seven Deadly Sins Tournament (2001)
- WrestleCade
  - WrestleCade Heavyweight Championship (1 time)
- Wrestling Observer Newsletter
  - Feud of the Year (1992) with Jerry Lawler vs. The Moondogs
  - Most Overrated Wrestler (2005)
- Other championships
  - Memphis Grizzlies Wrestling Championship (1 time)

^{1}After AAA retracted their working relationship with Total Nonstop Action Wrestling, Jarrett's win was stricken from AAA's records. However, when the relationship was resumed in 2010, AAA once again began recognizing Jarrett as a former Rey de Reyes.

^{2} Despite being a National Wrestling Alliance (NWA) championship, Jarrett won the title while working for the World Wrestling Federation as part of their angle with the NWA.

^{3} Upon winning the title for the second time, Jarrett instantly unified it with the NWA World Heavyweight Championship.

== Luchas de Apuestas record ==
Winner (wager)	Loser (wager)	Location	Event	Date	Notes
X-Pac (hair)	Jeff Jarrett (hair)	New York City, New York, US	SummerSlam	August 30, 1998	
Dr. Wagner Jr. (hair)	Jeff Jarrett (hair)	Puebla, Puebla, Mexico	Héroes Inmortales XII	October 28, 2018	
