= Karen Jarrett =

Professional wrestling manager

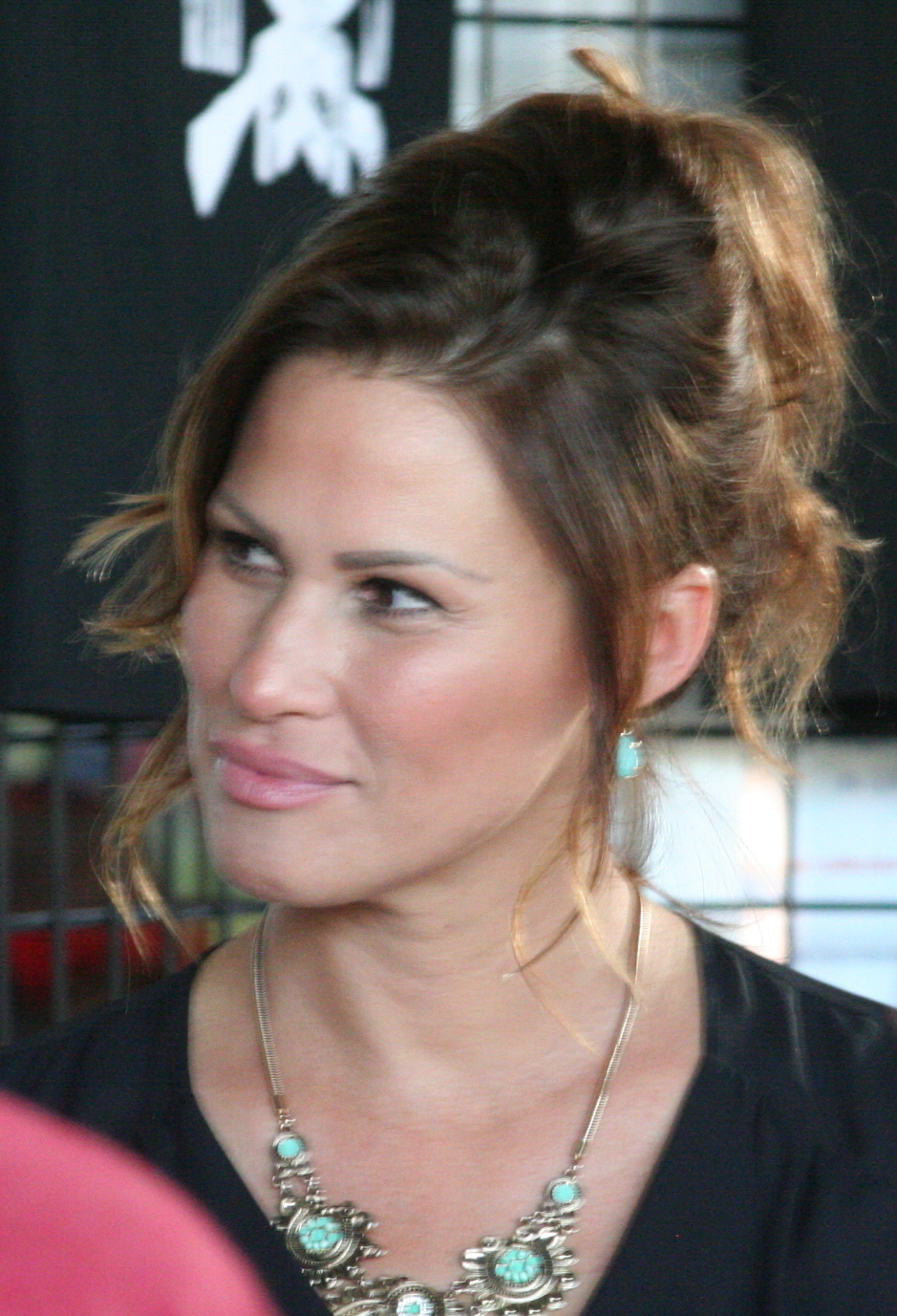
- Jarrett in 2014

Personal information
- Born: Karen Smedley; October 12, 1972 (age 53) Greensburg, Pennsylvania, U.S.
- Spouses: Kurt Angle (m. 1998; div. 2008) Jeff Jarrett (m. 2010)
- Children: 2
- Family: Jerry Jarrett (father-in-law)

Professional wrestling career
- Ring name(s): Karen Angle; Karen Jarrett
- Billed height: 5 ft 10 in (1.78 m)
- Debut: August 2007

Karen Jarrett (née Smedley and formerly Angle, born October 12, 1972) is an American professional wrestling valet and personality appearing for All Elite Wrestling (AEW). She is the former wife of professional wrestler and Olympic gold medalist Kurt Angle and the current wife of AEW wrestler Jeff Jarrett.

She previously served as ringside manager for both Angle and Jarrett, and later as an on screen authority figure in Total Nonstop Action Wrestling.

== Professional wrestling career ==
=== World Wrestling Federation/Entertainment (2001, 2004) ===
Karen was never involved in a storyline of World Wrestling Entertainment while her then-husband Kurt Angle was under contract. She herself was never under contract, but did briefly appear at Unforgiven 2001 as a part of the big celebration with the Angle family following Kurt Angle's victory over Stone Cold Steve Austin for the WWF Championship. She also made an appearance on the WrestleMania XX DVD set in a bonus segment regarding Kurt Angle.

=== Total Nonstop Action Wrestling (2007–2008) ===
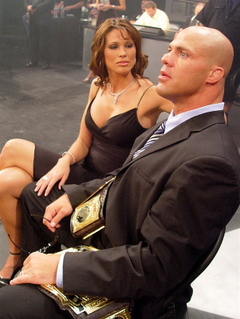
Jarrett and Kurt Angle watching a match at ringside during an episode of Impact!

Karen Angle was introduced in Total Nonstop Action Wrestling (TNA) in the summer of 2007 when Samoa Joe and Kurt Angle were feuding for an all-at-once Triple Crown Championship (Kurt held the TNA World Heavyweight Championship, and Joe held the TNA X Division and TNA World Tag Team Championship). Karen was supposedly wanting to divorce Kurt, claiming that he was emotionally abusive toward both her and their children. At the Hard Justice pay-per-view, however, Karen betrayed Joe during his match with her husband, resulting in Kurt winning the Triple Crown (thus turning her heel). In the following weeks, her character began to develop into a manipulative vamp, such as when she claimed that Sting slapped her at No Surrender when, in fact, he had not. This led to Kurt and Sting losing the Tag Team titles to Team Pacman after Kurt executed the Olympic slam on Sting. Another feud then erupted between Kurt Angle and Sting, in which Sting had Karen arrested for violating a restraining order and Kurt for stalking Sting's son.

At Genesis, Karen persuaded A.J. Styles and Tomko into helping Kurt retain the TNA World Heavyweight Championship during the tag team match for the title. In late 2007, Karen began to have issues with Booker T's wife Sharmell, claiming there was only room for one "queen" in TNA (a direct reference to Booker T's and Sharmell's last WWE gimmick, where they were self-proclaimed royalty after Booker won the 2006 King of the Ring tournament). This led to a catfight at the December 12 TNA Impact! tapings. Karen suffered a broken foot after jumping from the apron after an in-ring segment. She did not miss any time as a result of TNA's taping schedule. On the February 14, 2008 episode of Impact!, Karen was scheduled to renew her wedding vows to Kurt, but in the storyline, she was pronounced married to A.J. Styles after the priest, who had just been knocked down by Kevin Nash, awoke and married the two, mistaking Styles for Kurt. Kurt then started to emotionally attack Karen for not ending the "marriage".

Later in the year, she proposed to separate from Kurt Angle (kayfabe) which Kurt Angle supported to "concentrate on his upcoming match with Samoa Joe at Lockdown". Since then, hints of a relationship with A.J. were given, after Kurt continued to ignore Karen, even having her ejected from her ringside seat at Lockdown. On the May 22, 2008 episode of Impact!, Kurt Angle asked Karen to the ring to forgive him for not performing his "husbandly duties" and to ask her to come home. Karen then left a begging Kurt in the ring after he pleaded for a second chance. At the end of Impact!, Karen came to the ring to the aid of A.J. Styles who was being beaten four on one by Booker T, Team 3D, and Tomko. After being ejected, Karen ran to the back to enlist Kurt's aid, who came out with a chair. Kurt threatened the four with the chair, only to turn around and see his estranged wife hugging a bloody AJ. Kurt freaked and hit AJ with the chair, thus prompting the four back in the ring. Team 3D held Karen up while Kurt held AJ's head, yelling at Karen, telling her this was all her fault. Kurt is quoted as saying to Karen, "This is your fault! You deceived me!"

On the May 29, 2008 edition of Impact! after being assaulted backstage before his entrance, A.J. ran to the ring to help Karen only to be beat down by Team 3D and Kurt Angle for the second week in a row. Christian Cage came to the ring to aid Styles but was viciously assaulted for his trouble as well. It was then announced that at the Slammiversary pay-per-view it would be A.J. Styles one-on-one with Kurt Angle. Karen then interfered helping A.J. Styles win his match against Kurt Angle at Slammiversary 2008, turning her face again. Shortly thereafter, Angle was given her own interview segment, Karen's Angle on iMPACT. Her first interview was Kaz on July 24, 2008. On the October 9, 2008 episode of Impact!, it was announced that Karen had to step down as the host of Karen's Angle to focus on her family. Her profile and Knockout photos were taken off TNA's official website, but were put back up a few days later.

=== Return to TNA (2011, 2015) ===
On January 10, 2011, TNA announced that Karen would be making her return to the promotion on the January 13 edition of Impact!, appearing beside her new husband Jeff Jarrett, who had been feuding with Kurt Angle. In her return appearance Karen confronted Angle just as he was about to attack Jeff, told him that she would not allow him to ruin their personal lives and promised to tell all about their divorce the following week. The following week Karen slapped Kurt, providing a distraction which allowed Jeff to beat him down. On February 13 at Against All Odds Jeff defeated Kurt in a singles match and as a result Angle was forced to walk Karen down the aisle, when she and Jarrett renewed their wedding vows on the March 3 edition of Impact!. On March 3 Angle proceeded to destroy the wedding set with an axe and forced wedding guest, New York Jet Bart Scott to tap out with the ankle lock. On May 15 at Sacrifice, Angle and Chyna, whom Angle had recently brought to the promotion to negate Karen, defeated the Jarretts in a mixed tag team match, after Karen submitted to Chyna. Due to a storyline injury, Karen missed the culmination of Jeff's and Angle's feud at Slammiversary IX and the following Impact Wrestling, which led to the defeated Jarrett leaving the company for a tour of Mexico. On June 18, Karen appeared beside her husband at Mexican promotion Lucha Libre AAA World Wide's (AAA) biggest event of the year, Triplemanía XIX, and provided a distraction, which led to Jeff defeating El Zorro for the AAA Mega Championship. On the September 1 edition of Impact Wrestling!, Eric Bischoff named Karen the new commissioner of the Knockouts Division. On the October 20 edition of Impact Wrestling, Jarrett aligned herself with Gail Kim and Madison Rayne. On the December 15 edition of Impact Wrestling, TNA's authority figure, Sting, fired both Jarretts from TNA as a result of Jeff losing to Jeff Hardy at Final Resolution.

Four years later, Karen, alongside her husband Jeff returned to Impact Wrestling on the June 24, 2015 tapings. Jeff announced that he would be the first entrant in the King of the Mountain match at Slammiversary 2015. Karen turned heel on the August 26 episode of Impact Wrestling when she revealed that she orchestrated the attacks on TNA General Manager Bully Ray and Drew Galloway. A team of 5 wrestlers from GFW fought against a team of 5 from TNA in a Lethal Lockdown match to determine complete control of TNA. GFW was unsuccessful when Drew Galloway pinned Brian Myers, thus exiling GFW from TNA.

=== Family Wrestling Entertainment (2013) ===
On October 12, 2013, Jarrett appeared at Family Wrestling Entertainment's Grand Prix, where she was named Commissioner.

=== Global Force Wrestling (2015–2017) ===
She is the co-founder of Global Force Wrestling.

=== Second return to Impact Wrestling / Global Force Wrestling (2017) ===
On January 5, 2017, it was announced that Karen Jarrett had rejoined Impact Wrestling, now under the ownership of Anthem Sports & Entertainment, as executive consultant role running Impact Wrestling. Jarrett returned as a face on the March 23 episode of Impact Wrestling, and was welcomed back by Jeremy Borash, she soon was interrupted by Ethan Carter III and then Josh Mathews. When Mathews said he knew the Jarrets would be gone forever, Karen would slap him ending the show. On the March 30 episode of Impact Wrestling, Jarrett would call out so called leader of the knockouts Sienna and gave her 10 seconds to apologize for her treatment of Allie but was interrupted by a debuting KM, Sienna's cousin who publicly berated Jarrett for asking Sienna to apologize. Jarrett was rescued by Braxton Sutter, who knocked KM out of the ring. Jarrett made a match between KM and Sutter for later that night. Later on the same night, Jarrett handed Borash a piece of paper for him to announce a Knockouts battle royal to determine the new number 1 contender to Rosemary's Knockouts Championship. On the April 20 episode Impact Wrestling, Karen Jarrett announced that Impact Wrestling and Global Force Wrestling had merged.

=== All Elite Wrestling (2023–present) ===
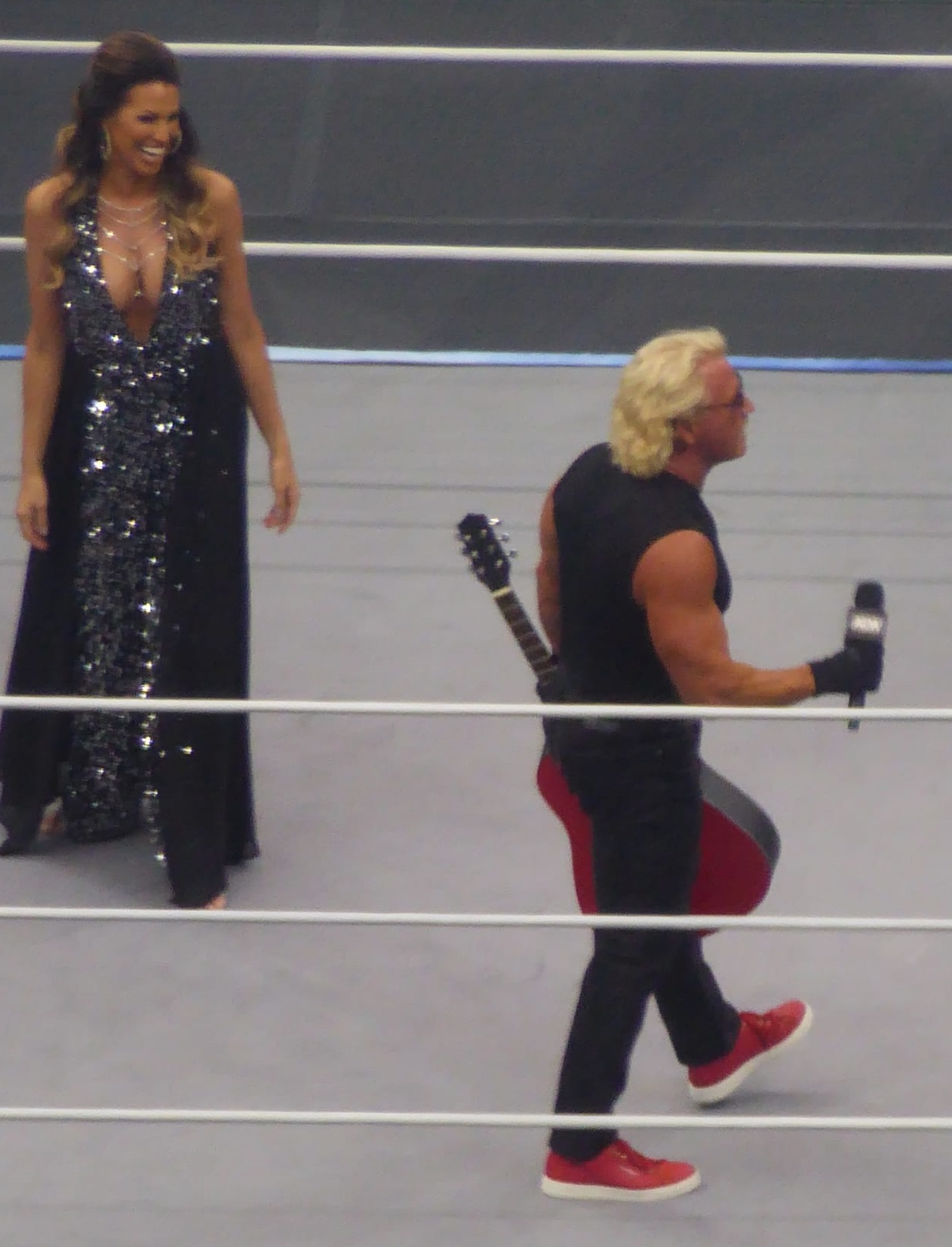
Karen Jarrett (left) and Jeff Jarrett (right) at All In in August 2023.

On May 17, 2023, Jarrett made her debut in All Elite Wrestling (AEW), helping her husband, Jay Lethal, and Satnam Singh attack FTR (Cash Wheeler and Dax Harwood) on Dynamite, and joining Jeff's stable.

== Personal life ==
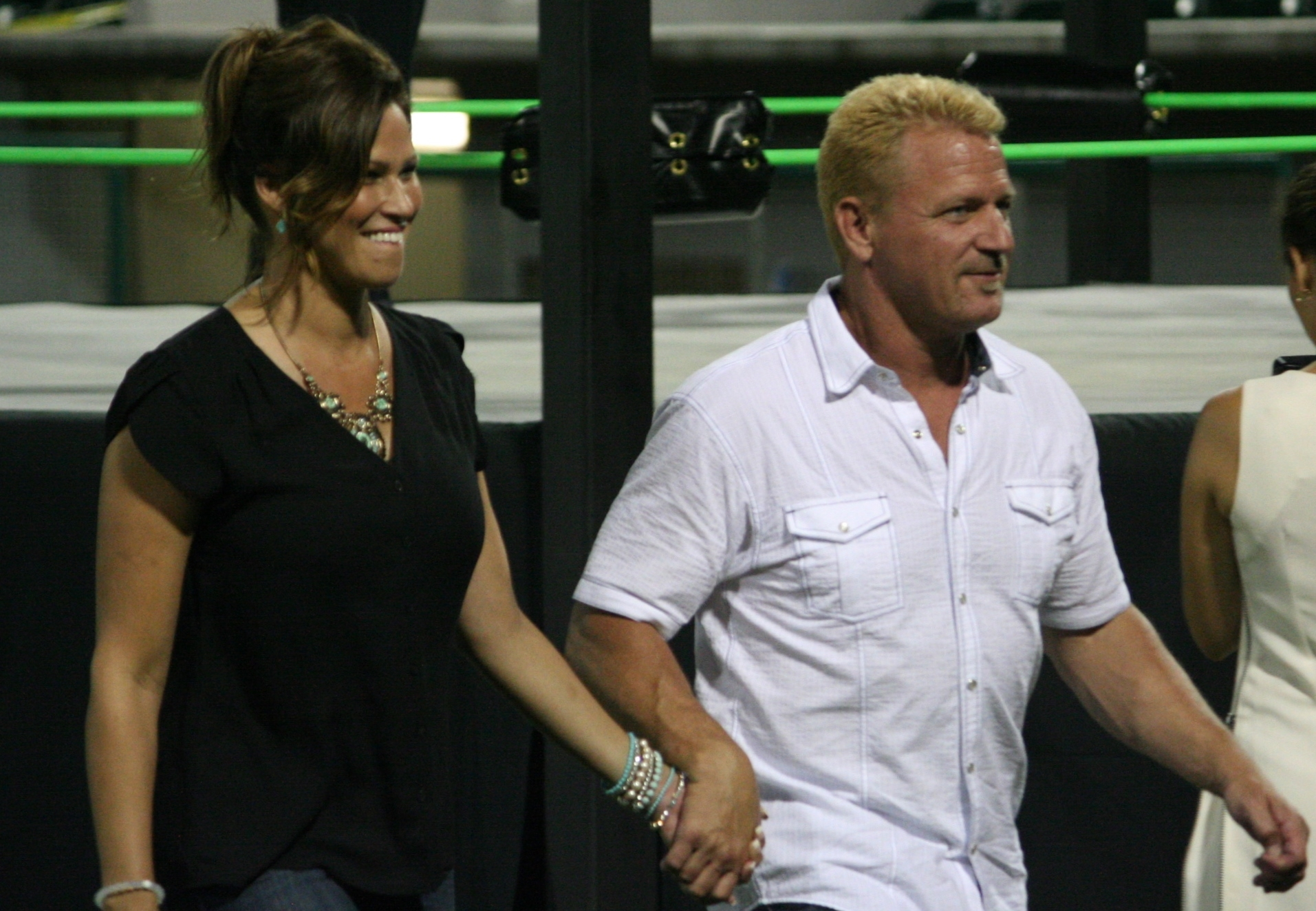
Karen and Jeff Jarrett in 2015

Karen has two children with her former husband Kurt Angle, whom she married in 1998. In 2008, Karen filed for divorce, which was finalized on October 26, 2008.

Karen was romantically linked to TNA co-founder Jeff Jarrett in 2009. The relationship was said to have started while Kurt and Karen were separated. This resulted in TNA president Dixie Carter placing Jarrett on a leave of absence. The situation was revealed in July 2009 when a caller claiming to be a former TNA employee called the Bubba the Love Sponge Show. On April 6, 2010, Karen announced that she and Jarrett were engaged. Karen and Jarrett were married on August 21, 2010.

During April 2016, the Wrestling Observer Newsletter published a report that Karen was involved in an argument with Lucha Underground announcer Melissa Santos during a WrestleCon in Dallas over the WrestleMania 32 weekend. Details include Santos was complaining about not having a chair to sit on, somehow leading to Karen spitting on her and a confrontation that nearly escalated into a fight. It was reported as early as July 27, 2017, Karen had a confrontation with WWE superstar Braun Strowman in a bar in Nashville. The report described Karen approached Braun with a request for an autograph for her son. Braun allegedly refused to sign an autograph and disrespected Karen with an unspecified but derogatory verbal response. Karen went on to identify her child was the son of then-WWE superstar Kurt Angle, prompting Strowman to apologize. After the story made sports news, Karen went on to state the incident was "blown way out of proportion."
