= Panda Energy International =

American privately held company

Panda Energy International, Inc.
- Type: Private
- Industry: Operations and Maintenance; Gas Utilities; Oil and Gas Equipment and Services; Oil and Gas Pipelines; Oil and Gas Refining and Marketing
- Predecessor: Panda Energy Corporation
- Founded: 1982; 44 years ago
- Founder: Robert W. Carter
- Fate: Closure
- Headquarters: Dallas, Texas, United States
- Area served: Worldwide
- Key people: Robert W. Carter; Founder of PANDA Energy, Chairman and CEO of Panda Power Funds (Panda Energy-affiliated company); Janice Carter; President and CEO (Panda Energy); Todd W. Carter; President (Panda Power Funds); William C. Nordlund; Managing Director (Panda Energy Funds); Creede Williams; Sr. Vice President and General Counsel; Don Thorpe; Vice President, Operations; Salwa W. Nicolas; Controller; Robert K. Simmons; Managing Director, Chief Financial Officer and Chief Compliance Officer
- Products: Power plants Pipelines Clean fuels
- Parent: Panda Energy Funds
- Divisions: Panda Global Services
- Website: www.pandaenergy.com

Panda Energy International, Inc. was an American privately held company headquartered in Dallas, Texas which constructed, maintained and operated environmentally friendly power plants. The organization was recognised by Newsweek magazine as one of the then-top ten eco-friendly energy companies in America. As of 2010, it had been affiliated with Panda Power Funds. Panda Energy informed its shareholders that it would shut down at the end of 2018.

== History ==
Panda Energy, headquartered in Dallas, Texas was founded in 1982 and has financed, constructed and operated large-scale energy facilities both domestically and internationally. The company built the two largest gas-fueled merchant electric generation facilities in the United States totaling 4,400 megawatts of generating capacity; was responsible for the first U.S. sponsored, internationally financed run-of-the-river hydroelectric project in the Himalayan nation of Nepal; and obtained the first U.S. capital markets financing for construction of a power plant in the People's Republic of China. Altogether, the company has raised over U.S. $4.9 billion to develop and build more than 9,000 megawatts of generating capacity.

Through a combination of financing, construction and operational activities, Panda Energy is involved in the creative developing, structuring, and financing of complex, capital-intensive energy projects that represent more than 9,000 megawatts of clean gas technology with a total cost of more than $5 billion in financing.

The Carter family had owned a controlling stake in the company ever since, making Panda Energy a family business. Robert W. Carter had been the chairman of the board and chief executive officer of Panda Energy International Inc. (Panda International), holding company offices as manager of Panda Rosemary, LLC. He served as the chairman and chief executive officer of Panda Global Energy Company. He held similar chief executive positions with Panda Energy Corporation ('PEC'), a subsidiary of Panda International and its subsidiaries since he founded PEC in 1982.

Carter also is president of Robert Carter Oil & Gas, Inc. (an oil and gas exploration company), which he founded in 1980. From 1978 to 1980, Carter was vice president of oil and gas lease sales for Reserve Energy Corporation (an oil and gas exploration company). From 1974 to 1978, he served as a marketing consultant to Forward Products, Inc. (a petrochemical company). Carter was executive vice president of Blasco Industries (a chemical and textile manufacturer) from 1970 to 1974. He served as a sales representative and sales manager for Olin Mathieson Chemical Corporation (a petrochemical, pulp and paper company) from 1965 to 1970. From 1960 to 1965, he was a sales representative for Inland, Mead Paper Company in Atlanta. He has been the chairman and director of Panda Ethanol Inc. since November 6, 2006.

=== Closure ===
In 2017, Panda's power plant in Temple, Texas declared Chapter 11 bankruptcy.

On September 6, 2018, Panda chairman Janice Carter sent what she referred to as "this final shareholder letter." The letter stated, "Independent power companies can no longer compete in today's power market against government subsidized renewables, such as wind. Panda Energy International, Inc. will officially shut down its operations by the end of the year. Over the past 36 years we have returned approximately 20X money to our initial investors. Panda's current assets have an appraised value of approximately $7.8 Million which it will endeavor to sell to the highest bidder. If a sale is successful, these funds will then be distributed as a dividend to its shareholders." She closed by thanking all shareholders for their support over the years. In 2022, Panda's power plant converted its Chapter 11 bankruptcy to a Chapter 7 bankruptcy liquidation.

=== TNA Entertainment, LLC. ===
In October 2002, Panda Energy purchased a controlling interest (72%) of the Nashville, Tennessee-based professional wrestling promotion Total Nonstop Action Wrestling from founder and CEO Jerry Jarrett. The seemingly unlikely acquisition came about after TNA publicist Dixie Carter, the daughter of Robert W. Carter, contacted her father and persuaded him to purchase the company (which was facing bankruptcy after a major financial backer, HealthSouth Corporation, withdrew their support).

On October 31, 2002, Panda Energy created the limited liability company TNA Entertainment in order to administer TNA. While Jeff Jarrett, the former president of TNA, was appointed vice president, the majority of other management positions were filled by former Panda executives. Chris Sobol, the Panda manager of business development, was appointed vice president of operations, and Frank Dickerson (and later Kevin Day) was appointed chief executive officer, while Dixie Carter was made president.

As of April 18, 2016, it has been reported that, upon Jarrett selling his stake in TNA, Panda Energy completely divested themselves of TNA, resulting in Panda Energy founder Robert Carter and president and chief executive officer Janice Carter's daughter, Dixie, acquiring both Jarrett & Panda Energy's ownership interests, resulting in her becoming owner, as well as continuing as president until the company was shut down.
