= Corsica Joe =

American professional wrestler (1920–2010)

Personal information
- Born: Francois Miquet; January 17, 1920 Bonbillett, France
- Died: March 14, 2010 (aged 90) Nashville, Tennessee, United States

Professional wrestling career
- Ring name(s): Corsica Joe; Francois Miquet; Billy Virag; The Blitzer; Mephisto #1; Mr. M
- Billed height: 6 ft 3 in (1.91 m)
- Billed weight: 260 lb (120 kg)
- Billed from: Corsica
- Debut: 1947
- Retired: 1973

Francois Miquet (January 17, 1920 – March 14, 2010) was a French-American professional wrestler who worked primarily in the United States of America under the ring name Corsica Joe. As Corsica Joe he teamed up with Jean Louis Roy, who was billed as "Corsica Jean" to form a very successful tag team known as "The Corsicans". The Corsicans held a number of tag team championships, especially in the southern National Wrestling Alliance (NWA) territories of NWA Mid-America, Gulf Coast Championship Wrestling, Championship Wrestling from Florida and Georgia Championship Wrestling. He was the brother of Felix Miquet who was also a wrestler, but worked primarily in the United Kingdom. He was married to female pro wrestler Sarah Lee, sometimes billed as "Sara Corsica".

== Professional wrestling career ==
=== Early career ===
Miquet moved to the United States at some point before 1947 and made his professional wrestling debut in 1947, using his real name as his ring name. In 1948 he defeated Bob Lortie to win the NWA Canadian Junior Heavyweight Championship, a championship he was said to have held for two years.

Miquet spent most of 1953 wrestling in Germany where he used the name Billy Virag, possibly to avoid confusion with his brother Felix Miquet that was known in the wrestling circuits throughout Europe. In 1954 he worked as the masked ring character "Mr. M" in Germany before returning to the United States in mid-1954, once again billed under his birth name.

=== The Corsicans ===
After competing in the northeastern United States and Canada for several years, Miquet began wrestling in the south east around 1957. In Mid-Atlantic Championship Wrestling he became known as "Corsica Joe", billing him as hailing from the French island of Corsica.

A few months later, wrestling promoters Nick Gulas and Roy Welch in the NWA Mid-America promotion teamed Miquet up with French-Canadian Jean Louis Roy, billing him as "Corsica Jean" to form a tag team known as "The Corsicans". The team became the first holders of the Mid-America version of the NWA World Tag Team Championship and over the next two years the Corsicans held the championship on no less than seven occasions as well as the NWA Southern Tag Team Championship on three separate occasions. The Corsicans faced off against virtually every tag team in the NWA Mid-America promotion at the time, including The Fabulous Fargos (Jackie Fargo and Don Fargo), Mike and Doc Gallagher, Yvon Robert and Billy Wicks, Don and Luke Fields and The Heavenly Bodies (Don and Al Greene).

In mid-1959, the Corsicans toured Texas, working for the Dallas, Texas based Southwest Sports, Inc. In Texas the duo won the NWA Texas Tag Team Championship on one occasion as well as the local version of the NWA World Tag Team Championship. Miquet, as Corsica Joe also held the NWA Texas Heavyweight Championship for a few weeks.

By 1960, the Corsicans were back in the southeast, holding different versions of the NWA Southern Tag Team Championship, including the Gulf Coast version twice, the Florida version once, the Georgia version twice, and the Mid-America version again. They also captured the Mid-America version of the World Tag Team Championship and Georgia Championship Wrestling's NWA International Tag Team Championship.

=== Late career ===
After years as a tag team the Corsicans finally split up in 1966, leaving Miquet to team with Chin Lee for one last run with the NWA Southern Tag Team Championship. In 1969, he briefly worked for Central States Wrestling as the masked Mephisto #2, and would work as the masked "The Blitzer" for NWA Mid-America in 1972.

Miquet retired from wrestling in 1973 at the age of 52 or 53. Although retired in 1973, Joe did make appearances for the NWA World Wide area, with Bert Prentice being the promoter. Joe did team up with his wife in a match, in Nashville, against Clarence Santini (as Spunkmeyer) and Shorty Taylor. this was Joe's last match.

== Personal life ==
Francois Miquet was the brother of Felix Miquet who was also a wrestler, but who worked primarily in the United Kingdom so the two never worked together. Miquet was married to a female pro wrestler named Sarah Lee, sometimes billed as "Sara Corsica" or "Mrs. Corsica Joe", and they were together as husband and wife for almost 45 years of marriage until she died at the age of 76 in 2008. Miquet died on March 14, 2010, in Nashville, Tennessee, at the age of 90. On 2008 Miquet, as Corsica Joe, was inducted into the NWA Hall of Fame.

== Championships and accomplishments ==
- Cauliflower Alley Club
  - Gulf Coast/CAC Honoree (2001)
- Championship Wrestling from Florida
  - NWA Southern Tag Team Championship (Florida version) (1 time) - with Corsica Jean
- Elite Canadian Championship Wrestling
  - Canadian Junior Heavyweight Championship (1 time)
- Gulf Coast Championship Wrestling
  - NWA Southern Tag Team Championship (Gulf Coast version) (2 times) - with Corsica Jean
- Georgia Championship Wrestling
  - NWA International Tag Team Championship (Georgia version) (1 time) - with Corsica Jean
  - NWA Southern Tag Team Championship (Georgia version) (2 times) - with Corsica Jean
- NWA Mid-America
  - NWA World Tag Team Championship (Mid-America version) (5 times) - with Corsica Jean
  - NWA Southern Tag Team Championship (Mid-America version) (3 times) - with Corsica Jean (2), Chin Lee (1)
  - NWA Tri-State Tag Team Championship (Alabama version) (1 time) – with Masked Blitzer #2
- Southwest Sports, Inc.
  - NWA Texas Heavyweight Championship (1 time)
  - NWA Texas Tag Team Championship (1 time) - with Corsica Jean
  - NWA World Tag Team Championship (Texas version) (1 time) - with Corsica Jean
- National Wrestling Alliance
  - NWA Hall of Fame (Class of 2008)
