= Len Rossi =

American professional wrestler (1929–2020)

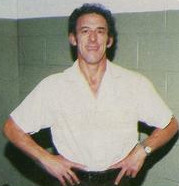
- Rossi in 1979

Personal information
- Born: Rinaldo Leonard Rositani; September 24, 1929 Utica, New York, United States
- Died: October 9, 2020 (aged 91) Nolensville, Tennessee
- Spouse: Jeanie Rossi (m. 1993)

Professional wrestling career
- Billed weight: 206 lb (93 kg)
- Billed from: Utica, New York
- Debut: 1958
- Retired: 1972

Rinaldo Leonard Rositani (September 24, 1929 – October 9, 2020), known professionally as Len Rossi, was an American professional wrestler who competed throughout the National Wrestling Alliance from 1958–1972. A 14-time NWA World Tag Team Champion and one of the most popular stars in the history of NWA Mid-America, Rossi was also a member of both the NWA Hall of Fame (class of 2016) and the Professional Wrestling Hall of Fame (class of 2004).

== Early life ==
Rossi was born to Italian migrant parents in 1929 in Utica, New York. He worked out at a local YMCA in his teenage years where a coach goaded him into wrestling. Rositano stated that "he mopped the floor with me, but I took it as a challenge" and from the age of 14, he wrestled for the YMCA. Due to their being no high school wrestling program in the area, he wrestled unsanctioned matches for a few dollars a shot. He then served two years in the U.S. military but his sights were set on a career in wrestling. "That was my intention from the very beginning" Rositano stated. Soon thereafter he set about a career as a pro under New York promoter Ed Don George.

== Professional wrestling career ==
Len Rositano became Len Rossi early in his career after a Boston promoter told him that his surname would not fit onto a promotional poster. His first major rival was Gypsy Joe in 1954 and '55 in the NWA's Utah-Idaho area. He went on to wrestle in Texas, Illinois, Wisconsin and New York before traveling to Tennessee for what was scheduled to be a short tenure in 1958. With his son approaching age to start school, Len and his wife decided to settle in Tennessee. Rossi would leave the state to wrestle in different territories, as well as a tour of Japan, but Tennessee would be his home thereafter.

In June 1958, Rossi won the NWA World Tag Team Championship with Tex Riley, defeating Don & Jackie Fargo in NWA Mid-America, the first of fourteen reigns for Rossi. They continued as a team throughout the late 1950s and early 1960s, becoming the most popular team Nick Gulas's Mid-America territory. Rossi has credited Riley (the veteran of the pairing) for advancing his understanding of wrestling audiences. Rossi and Riley went on to have numerous reigns as tag team champions together with both the NWA World and NWA Southern Tag Team Championship.

Rossi was the main babyface and most popular wrestler on Birmingham's Channel 42 "Live Studio Wrestling" from the 1960s until 1972. "He was different than what they were used to seeing down here" fellow wrestler Billy Wicks said of Rossi, "he was a Yankee coming down to Tennessee and that wasn't easy". Rossi was also NWA Southern Junior Heavyweight Champion throughout much of the 1960s, defending the title primarily in NWA Mid-America and various promotions across the Southern U.S.

In 1972, at the height of his popularity, Rossi was involved in an automobile accident en route to a wrestling bout in Tupelo. He suffered serious external injuries including broken arms, ribs, ankle and broken bones in his feet though he sustained no internal injuries. “I was able to get out of the car with my left arm, which was not broken and roll into a ditch as a tractor trailer headed straight for us” Rossi stated about the accident. Ultimately, the injuries ended his wrestling career.

== Later life ==
After retiring from professional wrestling, Rossi became interested in healthy eating as a means of healing, which was spurred on after his accident and an unrelated stay in hospital. "God stepped in, and I went back to school to study natural healing and the use of nutriceuticals," Rossi said. For the past 40 years, he operated Len Rossi's Health Foods, the oldest operating merchant in Brentwood, Tennessee. Since his retirement from wrestling, Rossi was inducted into the NWA Hall of Fame (class of 2016) and the Professional Wrestling Hall of Fame (class of 2004). He was also honored by his adopted hometown in Tennessee for his "athletic career, induction into the NWA Hall of Fame and continued commitment to the community." Rossi died on October 9, 2020, in Nolensville, Tennessee. He was 91 years old.

== Championships and accomplishments ==
- National Wrestling Alliance
  - NWA World Tag Team Championship (Mid-America version) (16 times) – with Tex Riley (2), Jackie Fargo (1), Tamaya Soto (2), Johnny Walker (2), Don Carson (2), and Bearcat Brown (7)
  - NWA Mid-America Heavyweight Championship (1 time)
  - NWA Mid-America Tag Team Championship (3 times) – with Tony Charles (2) and Bearcat Brown (1)
  - NWA Southern Junior Heavyweight Championship (7 times)
  - NWA Southern Tag Team Championship (19 times) – with Dick Beyer (1), Tex Riley (3), Mario Milano (5), Jackie Fargo (2), Bad Boy Hines (1), Tomayo Soto (1), Bearcat Brown (5), Johnny Walker (1), Kevin Sullivan (1)
  - NWA Hall of Fame, Class of 2016
- Professional Wrestling Hall of Fame and Museum
  - Class of 2004 inductee
