= Lance Russell =

American professional wrestling announcer (1926–2017)

- Lance Russell
- Born: March 18, 1926; Memphis, Tennessee, U.S.
- Died: October 3, 2017 (aged 91); Memphis, Tennessee, U.S.
- Occupations: Professional wrestling announcer and commentator
- Years active: 1959–1997
- Spouse: Audrey (m. 1947; died 2014)
- Children: 3

Lance Russell (March 18, 1926 – October 3, 2017) was an American sports broadcaster and ring announcer, primarily serving as a professional wrestling announcer and commentator in the Memphis region from 1959 to 1997. In NWA Mid-America and its descendant, the Continental Wrestling Association Russell's primary announcing partner was Dave Brown. He is included in the National Wrestling Alliance (NWA)'s Hall of Fame and Hall of Heroes. In addition, he is in the United States Wrestling Association (USWA)'s Memphis Wrestling Hall of Fame and Wrestling Observer Newsletter's Hall of Fame.

== Professional wrestling career ==
=== Memphis (1959–1988) ===
Russell's career began at a television station in Jackson, Tennessee. He was asked to work as an announcer for a match promoted by Nick Gulas and Roy Welch. He had previous experience calling other sports such as basketball, boxing, football, and baseball. In addition to calling matches, Russell worked as a programming director, analyzing demographics to better understand his audience. This led to a revolution in wrestling programming, where at the time, Memphis wrestling aired on Saturday afternoons, but was often preempted by shows such as Wide World of Sports. Russell decided to air wrestling at 11am, against Gulas’ wishes, and his move paid off with Saturday morning wrestling.

He worked as an announcer in Memphis beginning in 1959. He called matches primarily for NWA Mid-America and its descendant promotion, the Continental Wrestling Association. His long-term announcing partner was radio disc jockey Dave Brown; their partnership began in 1967. About meeting Brown, Russell stated “I needed a guy to work with me because the guy that I had was dropping out of it. I was looking for an assistant. I got to know Dave around the station and was really impressed. When he said he would do something, he did it. Dave was just a very conscientious guy who was an extremely dependable man of his word. That attracted me to him. He had a great personality and a great sense of humor.” The two formed a remarkable announce team as well as a life-long friendship. Russell also helped Brown become the local weatherman, a career he continued for decades.

The duo gave a young Jerry Lawler some of his first exposure by showing his wrestling cartoons on their Saturday morning broadcast, which led Lawler to become a wrestler himself. Russell would often be called "banana nose", something Lawler would call Russell during his time as a heel, and the two were close friends behind the scenes. Russell did his best to sell angles, show his disdain for heels’ reprehensible deeds, and wrest good promos from wrestlers with limited skills on the microphone. Russell also announced Monday night matches at the Mid-South Coliseum. In addition, he live-announced taped house show matches from Tupelo, Mississippi during the late 1970s. He called the "Tupelo Concession Stand Brawl" between The Blonde Bombers (Wayne Farris and Larry Latham) and Jerry Lawler and Bill Dundee. He also called the 1981 "Empty Arena match" between Lawler and Terry Funk. There were times when Russell was legitimately taken aback by what he saw during most interviews he conducted with others. An infamous interview Russell was involved in saw Jos LeDuc take an ax and legitimately cut into his own flesh as he said he was taking a blood oath to destroy his opponent, as well as to get Jerry Lawler in the Memphis Coliseum. Russell, who also served as an executive for the TV station’s owner was shocked and justifiably concerned about what had just taken place.

An episode from 1981 found Russell being physically attacked by the Dream Machine and footage of the angle was included in the 2011 documentary Memphis Heat. He was also involved in angles where Jimmy Hart dumped flour on his head and was physically attacked by The Road Warriors. He also called the match where Jerry Lawler won the AWA World Heavyweight Championship from Curt Hennig. Into how big wrestling was in Memphis, Russell stated “we used to sell out 11,000 every single week in the Memphis Mid-South Coliseum and I’d ride all the guys in the East who would talk about Madison Square Garden. Look at that man, they’d say, we had 24,000 people there. And then I’d say, yeah but that was in a city with eight million, and we’re sitting down in here in Memphis with 350,000 people and we had 44,000 people in one month spread over four shows.”

Although Russell spent the majority of his career calling matches in Memphis, his remarkable announce style led to national fame during the 1980s. The proliferation of VCRs in the 1980s expanded the practice of tape trading, allowing wrestling fans to watch from all over the country. Lance Russell’s popularity grew as a new fanbase embraced his distinctive style. He also benefited from the national exposure Memphis enjoyed during Jerry Lawler’s feud with entertainer Andy Kaufman thanks to I’m From Hollywood, a documentary chronicling Kaufman’s foray into Memphis.

=== Later career (1989–1997) ===
Russell made his debut in World Championship Wrestling (WCW) on the March 11, 1989 edition of NWA World Wide Wrestling alongside Jim Ross. It was his first national broadcast. In WCW, he also worked with announcers Bob Caudle and Gordon Solie. He left WCW in 1993, but still occasionally called matches for the company. During the 1990s, he was also the director of programming for RKO General, the owner of WHBQ-TV. He also worked as an announcer for Smoky Mountain Wrestling toward the end of their existence. He returned to Memphis Wrestling, paired once again with Brown and/or Corey Maclin, and went into retirement with an announcement on Memphis Wrestling in 1997.

=== Legacy and style ===
He has been called "one of the greatest wrestling announcers of all time" by SLAM Wrestling and "integral" to Memphis Wrestling. Scott Bowden, a professional wrestling manager, said of Russell, "In my heart, he's the announcer equivalent of [former world champ] Lou Thesz." Jim Ross included Russell in his top 10 list of favorite wrestling announcers and commentators, calling him a "class act" and "southern legend". Mike Mooneyham, a professional wrestling journalist, has called him "the voice of Memphis wrestling". Russell was well-respected in his community, both by his co-workers, his family, and the members of his church. His achievements earned him various industry awards including inductions into the Pro Wrestling Observer Newsletter Hall of Fame and NWA Hall of Fame. Additionally, he taught Sunday school for years, with at least one of his students going on to become a broadcaster. His style and delivery has been described as earnest and smooth. He was known for his euphemisms such as "Sam Hill" and "Don't start with the smart stuff."

== Other media ==
Russell's work in Memphis Wrestling is shown in the 1989 documentary, I'm from Hollywood. He is also interviewed in regards to the film's primary subject, Andy Kaufman. Russell appears in the 1999 Kaufman biographical film Man on the Moon as the Memphis ring announcer. Russell's original commentary of the Lawler/Kaufman match can be found on the WWE Home Video DVD release Greatest Wrestling Stars of the '80s, as part of the profile of Lawler.

== Personal life ==
Russell was married for 67 years to his wife Audrey until her death in 2014. They met in high school. They had three children: William, Valerie, and Shane.

On October 3, 2017, Russell died in Memphis while visiting his family of complications from a broken hip sustained after a fall, at the age of 91, just days after his daughter Valerie died from cancer on September 29.

== Awards and accomplishments ==
- Cauliflower Alley Club
  - Announcers Award (2016)
- George Tragos/Lou Thesz Professional Wrestling Hall of Fame
  - Gordon Solie Award 2027
- Memphis Wrestling Hall of Fame
  - Class of 1994
- National Wrestling Alliance
  - NWA Hall of Fame (2006)
  - NWA Wrestling Legends Hall of Heroes (2009)
- United States Wrestling Association
  - Memphis Wrestling Hall of Fame (Class of 1994)
- Wrestling Observer Newsletter
  - Best Television Announcer (1984–1987)
  - Wrestling Observer Newsletter Hall of Fame (Class of 1996)
