= NWA Hall of Fame =

Professional wrestling hall of fame

The NWA Hall of Fame logo (2008–2017)

The National Wrestling Alliance (NWA) Hall of Fame is an American professional wrestling hall of fame maintained by the NWA. It was established in 2005 to honor select wrestling personalities, mostly alumni of the NWA. Inductees receive commemorative medals that have their names inscribed on it with the logo of the NWA.

The Class of 2005, the inaugural inductees into the Hall of Fame did not have a formal induction ceremony; as a result, they received their medals at a later time. A private gathering was conducted for the Class of 2006, in which inductees received their medal. Beginning with the Class of 2008 on June 7, 2008, a ceremony has been conducted to formally induct the inductees. There were no inductees in 2007 due to the planning of an international expansion to the NWA. On June 7, 2008, the Class of 2008 was inducted into the Hall of Fame. Ric Flair, a member of the Class of 2008 and a World Wrestling Entertainment (WWE) employee at the time of the ceremony, was inducted on October 4, 2008, after his WWE contract had expired; his WWE contract prevented him from appearing in other organizations. Similarly to the World Championship Wrestling's Hall of Fame, the 2008 ceremony was held during a wrestling event.

Inductees for the Class of 2009 were announced during the summer of 2009 for an induction ceremony on September 26; however, that ceremony never took place and the announced wrestling personalities were never inducted formally, evident by the NWA's official website for the NWA Hall of Fame.

The inaugural Class of 2005 was inducted throughout 2005. Wrestler Lou Thesz's posthumous induction led the class, which included wrestler Harley Race, commentator Gordon Solie, and promoters Jim Cornette, Jim Barnett, and Sam Muchnick. Commentator Lance Russell's induction led the Class of 2006 on October 13, 2006, which also consisted of wrestlers Dory Funk Jr., Eddie Graham, Robert Gibson and Ricky Morton (The Rock 'n' Roll Express), Leilani Kai, and Saul Weingeroff. On June 7, 2008, wrestler Tommy Rich's induction led the Class of 2008, which consisted of wrestlers Joe and Jean Corsica (Corsica Brothers), Dennis Condrey and Bobby Eaton (The Midnight Express), Nikita Koloff, The Iron Sheik, and Ric Flair. Overall there are 87 inductees, 45 inductees were inducted posthumously.

== Inductees ==
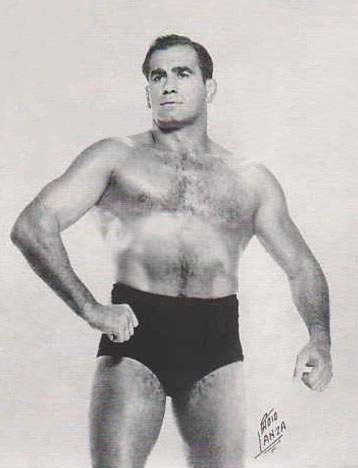
Lou Thesz, inducted in 2005

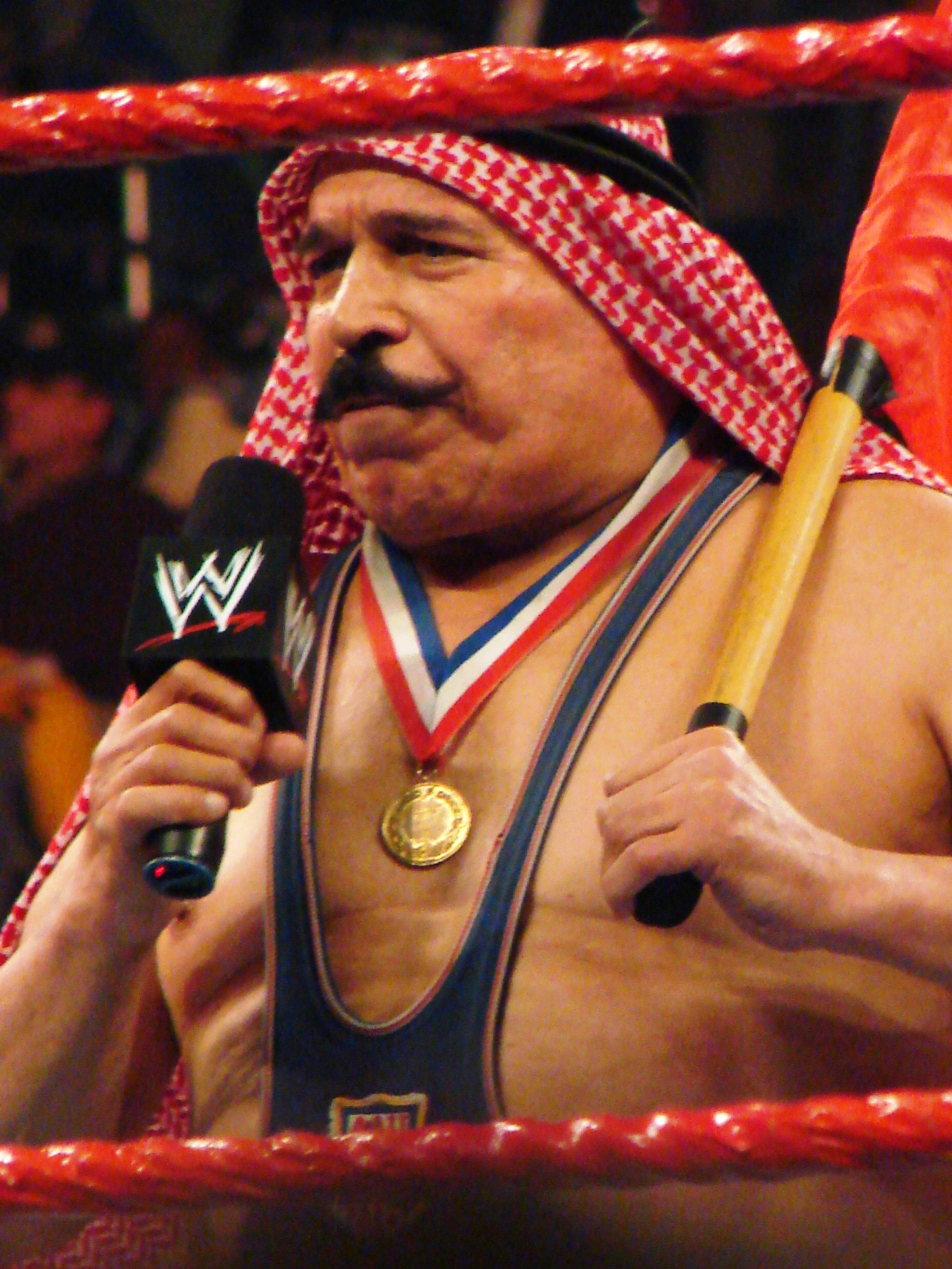
Iron Sheik, inducted in 2008

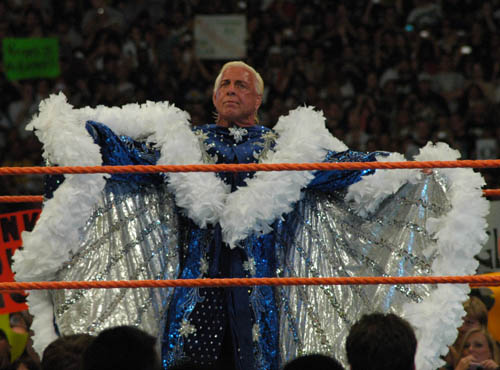
Ric Flair, inducted in 2008

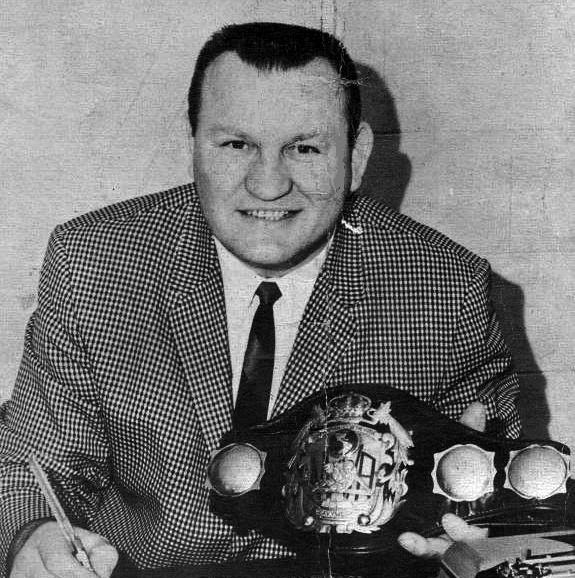
Gene Kiniski, inducted in 2009

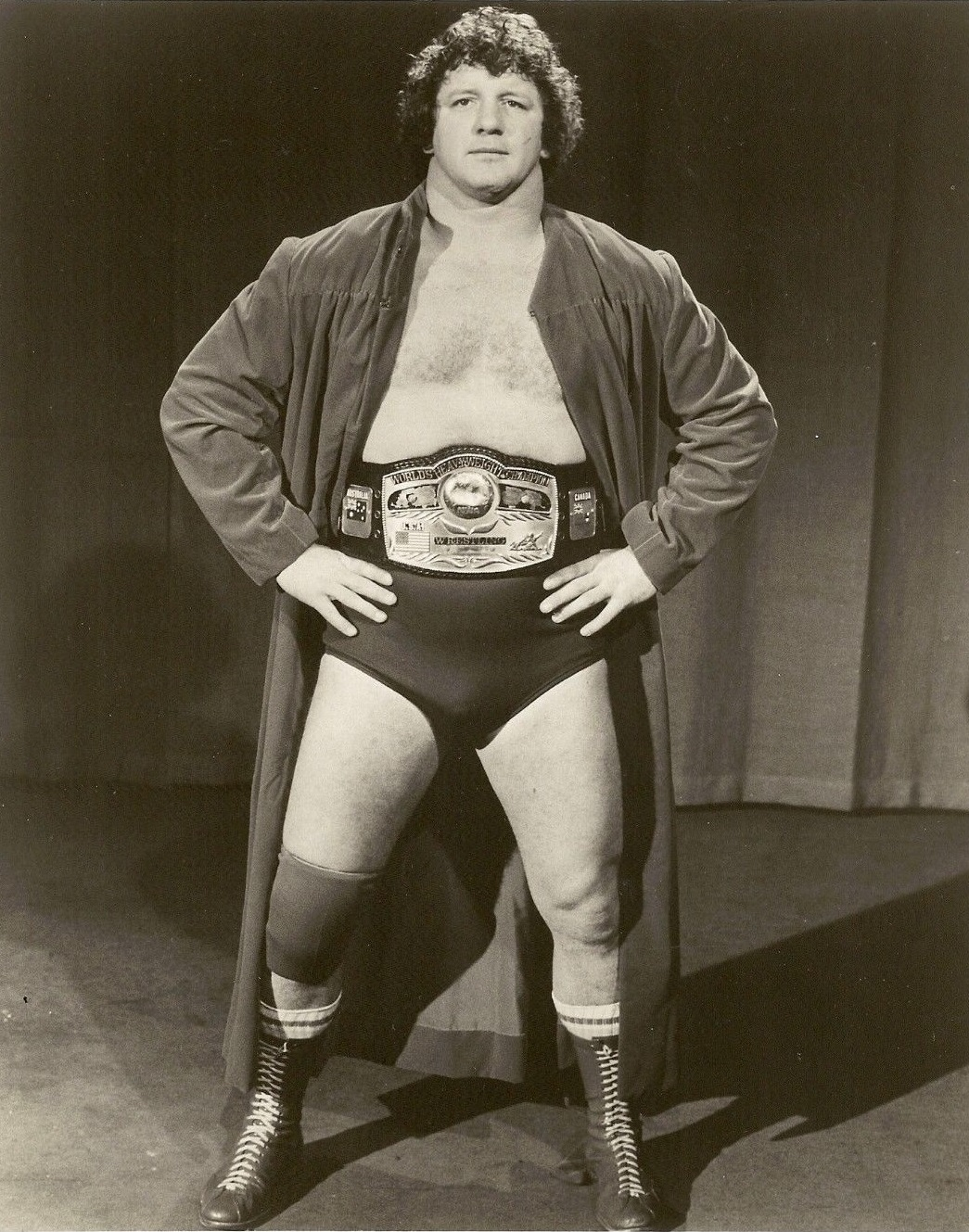
Terry Funk, inducted in 2009

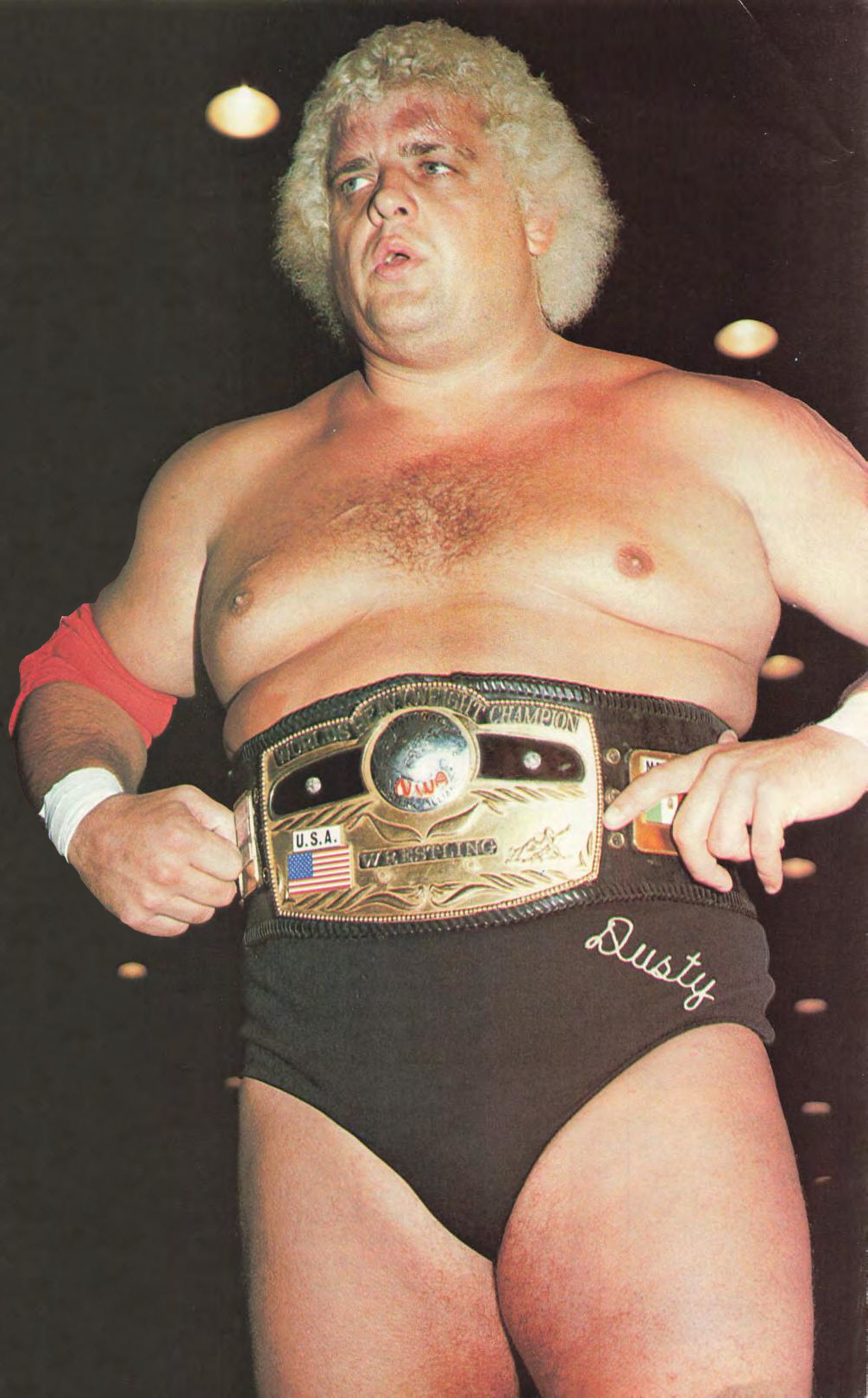
Dusty Rhodes, inducted in 2011

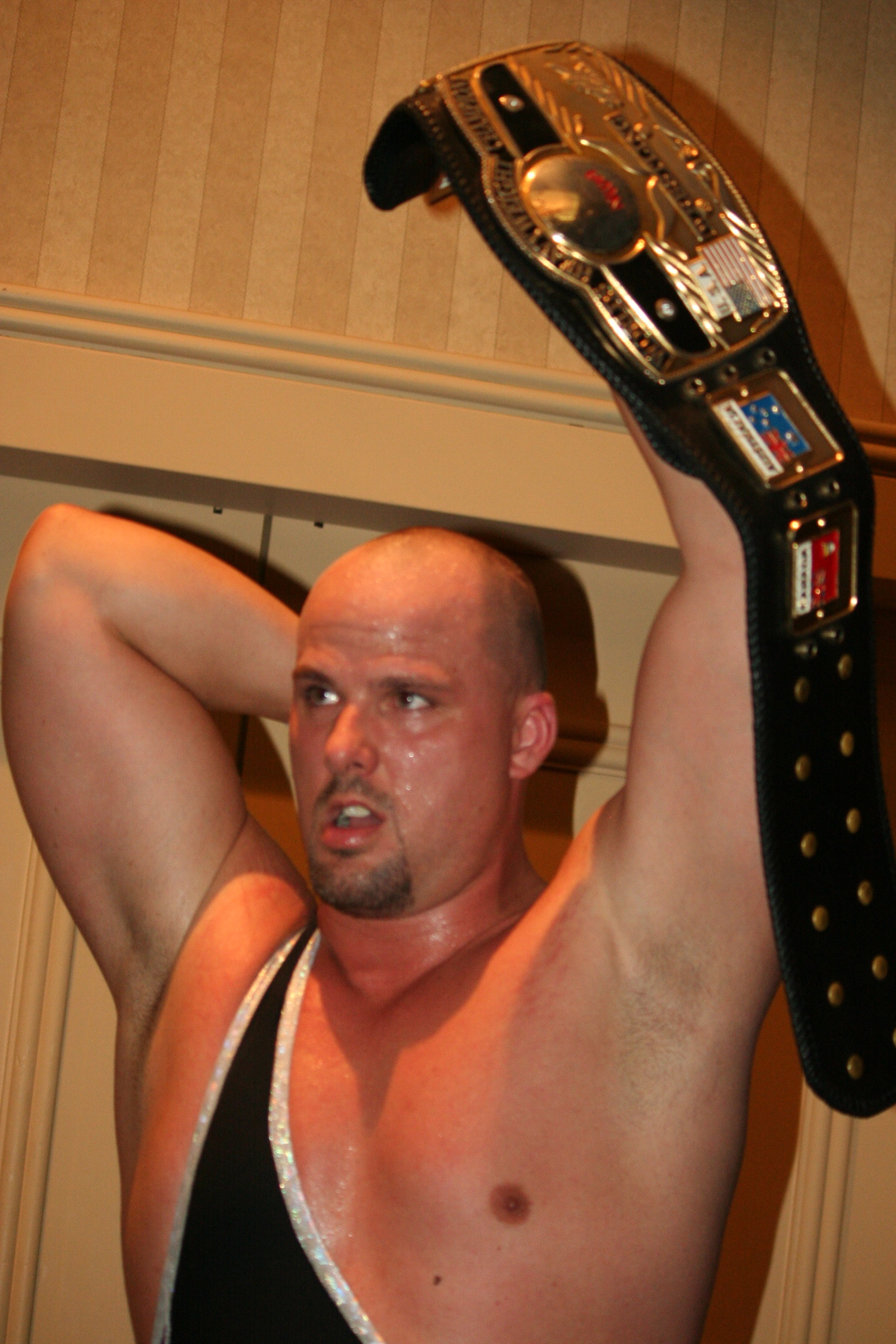
Adam Pearce, inducted in 2015

Year	Ring name (Birth name) (Note: Posthumous inductees are noted with a dagger (†).) (Note: Entries without a birth name indicates that the inductee did not perform under a ring name.)	Inducted for	Accolades (Note: Before the 1990s, the National Wrestling Alliance (NWA) distributed many of its titles among its numerous members. Other promotions listed in this column were, or are currently, members of the NWA.)
2005	Lou Thesz † (Aloysius Martin Thesz)	Wrestling	Three-time NWA World Heavyweight Championship, one-time NWA International Heavyweight Championship (All-Japan Version), one-time NWA Southern Junior Heavyweight Championship
2005	Harley Race	Wrestling	Eight-time NWA World Heavyweight Championship, NWA United States Heavyweight Championship (Mid-Atlantic/Georgia/WCW Version) (first champion) nine-time NWA Central States Heavyweight Championship and seven-time NWA Missouri Heavyweight Championship 3-times AWA World Tag Team Championship
2005	Sam Muchnick †	Promoting	Founded the NWA and served as president from 1950 to 1960 and 1963 to 1975
2005	Jim Barnett † (James Barnett)	Promoting	Owned Georgia Championship Wrestling during the mid-1970s. Also promoted in the Detroit Territory, Indianapolis Territory and Australia.
2005	Gordon Solie † (Francis Labiak)	Commentating	Commentator for Championship Wrestling from Florida and World Championship Wrestling promotions.
2005	Jim Cornette (James Cornette)	Managing	Managed various wrestlers during the 1980s and 1990s.
2006	Dory Funk Jr. (Dorrance Funk Jr.)	Wrestling	Held the NWA World Heavyweight Championship (1 time) for over four years, the second longest reign in the title's history,
2006	Saul Weingeroff † (Solomon Weingeroff)	Managing	Managed various wrestlers in the NWA during the 1960s and 1970s
2006	Lance Russell	Commentating	Commentated in the Continental Wrestling Association and Memphis Championship Wrestling companies
2006	Eddie Graham † (Edward Gossett)	Wrestling	Won over 20 NWA championships Promoter of Championship Wrestling from Florida.
2006	Leilani Kai (Patty Seymour)	Wrestling	Won the NWA World Women's Championship (1 time)
2008	The Iron Sheik (Khosrow Vaziri)	Wrestling	Won the NWA Mid-Atlantic Heavyweight Championship (1 time) and NWA World Television Championship (1 time),
2008	Ric Flair (Richard Fliehr) (Note: Name received upon his adoption as an infant. Due to the circumstances of his adoption through the scandal-ridden Tennessee Children's Home Society, Flair does not know his birth name.)	Wrestling	Won the NWA World Heavyweight Championship (10 times), NWA Mid-Atlantic Heavyweight Championship (4 times), NWA World Tag Team Championship (Mid-Atlantic Version) (3 times), NWA United States Heavyweight Championship (Mid-Atlantic/Georgia/WCW Version) (5 times), NWA Mid-Atlantic Tag Team Championship, NWA Mid-Atlantic Television Championship.
2008	Tommy Rich (Thomas Richardson)	Wrestling	Won the NWA World Heavyweight Championship (1 time), NWA Georgia Tag Team Championship (6 times),
2008	Nikita Koloff (Nelson Simpson)	Wrestling	Won the NWA National Heavyweight Championship (1 time) and NWA United States Heavyweight Championship (1 time), NWA World Six-Man Tag Team Championship (Mid-Atlantic), NWA World Tag Team Championship (Mid-Atlantic Version), NWA World Television Championship
2009	Gene Kiniski (Eugene Kiniski)	Wrestling	Held the NWA World Heavyweight Championship (1 time).
2009	Terry Funk (Terrence Funk)	Wrestling	Won the NWA World Heavyweight Championship, NWA United States Heavyweight Championship (Mid-Atlantic/Georgia/WCW Version).
2009	Paul Orndorff (Paul Orndorff Jr.)	Wrestling	Won the NWA World Tag Team Championship and NWA National Heavyweight Championship (3 times).
2009	Tully Blanchard	Wrestling	Won the NWA Mid-Atlantic World Tag Team Championship, NWA World Television Championship (2 times), NWA United States Heavyweight Championship (Mid-Atlantic/Georgia/WCW Version), NWA National Heavyweight Championship. Was a member of the original legendary NWA stable The Four Horsemen.
2009	Mil Máscaras (Aaron Rodríguez Arellano)	Wrestling	Won the NWA Americas Heavyweight Championship (5 times), NWA Americas Tag Team Championship, NWA Texas Tag Team Championship (2 times), NWA American Tag Team Championship.
2009	Jerry Jarrett (Jerry Jarrett Sr.)	Promoting	Operated Mid-Southern Wrestling, Continental Wrestling Association, United States Wrestling Association, World Class Championship Wrestling and Total Nonstop Action Wrestling. Won the NWA World Tag Team Championship (Mid-America version) NWA Southern Tag Team Championship (Mid-America version).
2009	Dennis Coralluzzo	Promoting	Posthumous Inductee: Longtime NWA New Jersey promoter and served as NWA President with Howard Brody and Steve Rickard from 1993 to 1995. The official induction ceremony was held at the Dennis Coralluzzo Invitational.
2010	Buddy Rogers † (Herman Rohde Jr.)	Wrestling	Won the NWA World Heavyweight Championship
2010	Jack Brisco † (Freddie Brisco)	Wrestling	Won the NWA World Heavyweight Championship (2 times) and the NWA Mid-Atlantic World Tag Team Championship (3 times with his brother Jerry).
2010	Dan Severn (Daniel Severn)	Wrestling	Two-time NWA World Heavyweight Championship
2010	Shinya Hashimoto †	Wrestling	Won the NWA World Heavyweight Championship, NWA Intercontinental Tag Team Championship
2010	Nick Gulas †	Promoting	Promoter of the NWA Mid-American territory in Tennessee
2010	The Sheik † (Edward Farhat)	Wrestling	Promoter of the Detroit Territory, won over 10 NWA championships
2010	Danny Hodge (Daniel Hodge)	Wrestling	Won the NWA World Junior Heavyweight Championship (8 times).
2010	Ed Chuman † (Edward Chuman)	Promoting	Promoter of NWA Midwest
2011	Pat O'Connor † (Patrick O'Connor)	Wrestling	Won the NWA World Heavyweight Championship (1 time)
2011	Dusty Rhodes (Virgil Runnels Jr.)	Wrestling	Won the NWA World Heavyweight Championship (3 times), NWA World Television Championship (3 times), NWA United States Heavyweight Championship (Mid-Atlantic/Georgia/WCW Version), NWA Florida Heavyweight Championship (12 times), NWA World Six-Man Tag Team Championship (2 times with Road Warroirs),
2011	Wahoo McDaniel (Edward McDaniel)	Wrestling	Posthumous Inductee, Won the NWA Mid-Atlantic World Tag Team Championship (4 times), NWA Florida World Tag Team Championship (2 times)
2011	Angelo Savoldi (Mario Fornini Sr.)	Wrestling	NWA World Junior Heavyweight Championship (5 times)
2011	Freddie Blassie † (Frederick Blassman)	Wrestling	NWA Americas Heavyweight Championship (Hollywood/Los Angeles version) (6 Times), NWA World Tag Team Championship (Georgia version), NWA World Tag Team Championship (Florida version).
2011	Rikidōzan † (Mitsuhiro Momota)	Wrestling	Won over 10 NWA championships
2011	Johnny Valentine † (John Wisniski)	Wrestling	Won over 30 NWA championships
2011	Bill Apter	Contributor	Editor of Pro Wrestling Illustrated
2011	Sue Green (Susan Green)	Wrestling	Won the NWA World Women's Championship
2012	Ricky Steamboat (Richard Blood, Sr.)	Wrestling	Won the NWA World Heavyweight Championship, NWA World Tag Team Championship (Mid-Atlantic Version), NWA World Television Championship (2 times), NWA United States Heavyweight Championship (Mid-Atlantic/Georgia/WCW Version) (3 times).
2012	Paul Boesch †	Promoting	Promoter of the NWA in Houston, TX
2012	Sputnik Monroe † (Rosco Merrick)	NWA Humanitarian Award	Won the NWA World Junior Heavyweight Championship, NWA World Tag Team Championship (Mid-America version).
2012	John Tolos †	Wrestling	Won over 30 NWA championships
2012	Mr. Wrestling (John Walker)	Wrestling	NWA World Tag Team Championship (Mid-America version), NWA World Tag Team Championship (Mid-Atlantic Version).
2012	Teddy Long (Theodore Long)	Refereeing	
2012	Little Beaver † (Lionel Giroux)	Wrestling	NWA World Midget's Championship (2 times)
2012	The Fabulous Moolah † (Mary Ellison)	Wrestling	Five-time NWA World Women's Championship and two-time NWA Women's World Tag Team Championship
2012	Joyce Grable (Betty Wade-Murphy)	Wrestling	Won the NWA Women's World Tag Team Championship (4 times), NWA United States Women's Championship
2012	Misty Blue Simmes (Diane Simmes)	Wrestling	Won the NWA United States Women's Championship
2013	Ray Stevens † (Carl Stevens)	Wrestling	Won various NWA World Tag Team Championships (6 times), AWA World Tag Team Championship (4 times), the NWA United States Heavyweight Championship (San Francisco version) and various regional NWA titles
2013	Salvador Lutteroth † (Salvador González)	Promoting	Was a member of the NWA from 1952 to 1986. Promotion was called EMLL until leaving the NWA and became CMLL.
2013	Dory Funk Sr. † (Dorrance Funk, Sr.)	Wrestling	Won the NWA World Junior Heavyweight Championship and various NWA regional titles.
2013	Bobo Brazil † (Houston Harris)	Wrestling	Won various NWA regional titles. Had a legendary feud with The Original Sheik over the Detroit version of the NWA United States Heavyweight Title.
2013	Jackie Fargo † (Henry Faggart)	Wrestling	Won the NWA Southern Tag Team Championship (22 times), various versions of the NWA World Tag Team titles and was one third of the first ever NWA World Six-Man Tag Team Championship.
2013	Ernie Ladd † (Ernest Ladd)	Wrestling	Won various NWA regional titles.
2014	Giant Baba † (Shohei Baba)	Wrestling, Promoting	Was the founder of All-Japan Pro Wrestling, which was a NWA member until 1989. Won the NWA World Heavyweight Championship (3 times), NWA World Tag Team Championship (Detroit version), NWA International Heavyweight Championship (All-Japan Version) (3 times), NWA International Tag Team Championship (All-Japan Version) (12 times), PWF Heavyweight Championship (4 times)
2014	Kevin Sullivan	Wrestling	Won the NWA United States Tag Team Championship (Mid-Atlantic/Georgia/WCW Version), NWA United States Tag Team Championship (Gulf Coast Version), NWA United States Junior Heavyweight Championship (Southeast Version), NWA World Tag Team Championship (Central States version), NWA World Tag Team Championship (Mid-America version)
2014	Pinkie George † (Paul George)	Promoting	Was a founder of the NWA. Was the Original President of the NWA.
2014	Ox Baker † (Douglas Baker)	Wrestling	NWA World Tag Team Championship (Los Angeles version), NWA Austra-Asian Tag Team Championship (2 times), NWA North American Heavyweight Championship (Calgary Version), NWA United States Heavyweight Championship (Detroit version), NWA American Heavyweight Championship (2 times), NWA Atlantic Coast Tag Team Championship, NWA Florida Tag Team Championship, NWA Georgia Tag Team Championship, NWA Texas Heavyweight Championship
2014	Cowboy Bob Kelly † (Robert Kelley)	Wrestling	Won the NWA United States Heavyweight Championship (Gulf Coast version) (2 times), NWA Gulf Coast Heavyweight Championship (10 times), NWA Gulf Coast Brass Knuckles Championship (2 times) NWA Gulf Coast Tag Team Championship (5 times), NWA Mississippi Heavyweight Championship (18 times), NWA Mississippi Tag Team Championship (4 times), NWA Louisiana Heavyweight Championship, NWA City of Mobile Heavyweight Championship (4 times), NWA City of Pensacola Heavyweight Championship
2014	J. J. Dillon (James Morrison)	Wrestling, manager	Manager of the Legendary 4 Horsemen, consisting of NWA Hall of Fame members Ric Flair; Ole Anderson; Tully Blanchard, and Arn Anderson. Titles won as a wrestler: NWA Florida Heavyweight Championship, NWA Florida Tag Team Championship, NWA Florida Television Championship, NWA Central States Heavyweight Championship, NWA North American Heavyweight Championship (Maritimes Version), IW International Heavyweight Championship (2 times)
2015	Adam Pearce	Wrestling	Five-time NWA World Heavyweight Championship, one-time NWA British Commonwealth Heavyweight Championship, two-time NWA Heritage Championship
2015	Leroy McGuirk †	Wrestling, Promoting	Was promoter of the Tri-State area in the NWA. As promoter, he controlled the NWA World Junior Heavyweight Championship. Won the NWA World Junior Heavyweight Championship, National Wrestling Association World Junior Heavyweight Title.
2015	Mike Sircy	Promoting	Promoter of the NWA Top Rope promotion in Tennessee.
2016	Nick Bockwinkel † (Nicholas Bockwinkel)	Wrestling	AWA World Heavyweight Championship (4 times), AWA World Tag Team Championship (3 times)
2016	Boris Malenko † (Lawrence Simon)	Wrestling	AWA World Tag Team Championship, NWA American Heavyweight Championship
2016	Len Rossi (Len Rositano)	Wrestling	NWA World Tag Team Championship (Mid-America version) (14 times)
2016	Gary Hart † (Gary Williams)	Promoting, Managing	NWA American Tag Team Championship (3 times)
2016	Jim Ross (James Ross)	Commentating	Colour commentator for Jim Crockett Promotions and Mid-South Wrestling.
2017	José Lothario (Guadalupe Robledo)	Wrestling	NWA American Tag Team Champion (5 times), NWA Brass Knuckles Champion Texas version (5 times), NWA Texas Heavyweight Champion (7 times).
2017	Everett Marshall	Wrestling	Two time NWA World Heavyweight Champion (National Wrestling Association version).

=== Group inductions ===
NWA Hall of Fame Group Inductions
Year	Tag Team	Team Members	Notes
2006	The Rock 'n' Roll Express	Ricky Morton (Richard Morton); Robert Gibson (Ruben Cain)	NWA World Tag Team Championship (Mid-Atlantic) (4 times); NWA World Tag Team Championship (5 times)
2008	The Midnight Express	Dennis Condrey; Bobby Eaton (Robert Eaton)	NWA World Tag Team Championship (Mid-Atlantic); NWA American Tag Team Championship
2008	The Corsicans	Corsica Joe (Francois Miquet); Corsica Jean † (Jean Louis Roy)	NWA World Tag Team Championship (Mid-America version) (5 times); NWA World Tag Team Championship (Texas version)
2010	The Minnesota Wrecking Crew	Gene Anderson † (Eugene Anderson); Lars Anderson (Larry Heiniemi); Ole Anderson (Alan Rogowski)	NWA World Tag Team Championship (Georgia version) (2 times); NWA World Tag Team Championship (Mid-Atlantic version) (7 times)
2011	The LeBells	Aileen LeBell Eaton †; Mike LeBell †; Gene LeBell	Promoters of NWA Hollywood Wrestling (1968–1983)
2012	The Road Warriors	Road Warrior Hawk † (Michael Hegstrand); Road Warrior Animal (Joseph Laurinaitis)	NWA National Tag Team Championship (4 times); AWA World Tag Team Championship; NWA International champions (All-Japan); NWA World Tag Team Championship (Mid-Atlantic Version); NWA World Six-Man Tag Team Championship (3 times); WWF World Tag Team Championship (2 times)
2013	The Fabulous Kangaroos	Al Costello † (Giacomo Costa); Roy Heffernan †	NWA World Tag Team Championship (Texas version); NWA World Tag Team Championship (Florida version); NWA United States Tag Team Championship (Northeast version) (3 times); NWA Canadian Tag Team Championship (Vancouver version) (4 times)
2015	The Wright Brothers	Ron Wright † (Luther Wright); Don Wright	NWA World Tag Team Championship (Mid-America version); NWA Tennessee Tag Team Championship (10 times)

== See also ==
- List of professional wrestling halls of fame
