= Dave Brown (meteorologist) =

American meteorologist and professional wrestling announcer (born 1946)

- Born: David H. Brown; September 1, 1946 (age 80); Trenton, Tennessee, U.S.
- Education: University of Memphis
- Occupation: TV meteorologist/professional wrestling announcer
- Years active: 1962–2015
- Spouse: Margaret Bramblett Brown
- Children: 3

David H. Brown (born September 1, 1946) is an American meteorologist. He is the former chief meteorologist from 1977 to 2015 for WMC-TV, the NBC affiliate in Memphis, Tennessee, USA. Brown is an American Meteorological Society Certified Broadcast Meteorologist and holds the Seal Of Approval of the National Weather Association.

== Career ==
Brown grew up in Trenton, Tennessee. He began his broadcasting career in 1962 as a disc jockey at WKBJ Radio in Milan, Tennessee as a sophomore in high school at age 15. He moved to WIRJ Radio in Humboldt, Tennessee one year later. When he came to Memphis to study political science at the University of Memphis, he moved to WHBQ-AM Radio56 in Memphis, where he was on the air from September 1964 to October 1968. In 1954, this station was the first in the world to play a song by Elvis Presley on the radio. In October 1968 he accepted an offer to become a staff announcer and host of Dialing For Dollars across the hall on WHBQ-TV. He began his career in meteorology as weathercaster on the initial broadcast of WHBQ-TVs 12 noon newscast in May 1972. He was named chief weathercaster from 1973 to 1977 before joining WMC-TV.

For a large portion of his broadcasting career (most of the period between 1967 and 2002), he also co-hosted the Memphis Wrestling television program (and its predecessor, Championship Wrestling), most notably for 25 of those years with Lance Russell, the rest with Corey Maclin. Russell and Brown have been described by wrestling insiders and fans as the greatest television announcing team in the history of wrestling.

Brown moved to WMC when Jerry Jarrett split from his business partners (who controlled the wrestling timeslot on Channel 13) to run his own Memphis territory. WMC agreed to air Jarrett's Championship Wrestling in the traditional Saturday timeslot, partly on the condition that "Lance and Dave" provided the commentary. Russell rejoined Brown several weeks after the initial broadcast on Channel 5, where wrestling remained for the next 26 years. Heel wrestlers and managers in the Memphis area like Jimmy Hart would nickname him "Dave Brown the Weather Clown", while others would nickname him "Howdy Doody".

Dave Brown and Lance Russell were inducted into the Memphis Wrestling Hall of Fame April 22, 2017. Many YouTube videos are online from the heyday of Dave, Lance and Memphis Wrestling.

In August 2014, Brown announced that WMC-TV had agreed to his request of a reduced schedule. Effective September 1, 2014 he was seen on the 6pm newscast only. In his announcement, he noted that he has worked since the age of 10, most of which he worked six days a week. Fifty-two of those years have been in broadcasting, more than 37 at WMC-TV. The reduced schedule was the first step to Brown's retirement, which was effective on August 31, 2015, when he took the title of Chief Meteorologist Emeritus.

Brown was formally inducted into the Tennessee Radio Hall of Fame on May 6, 2017.

Brown has been active in the campaign against drunk driving since the May 1997 death of his daughter, granddaughter and unborn grandson due to a drunk driver. Brown has spoken to students, civic clubs and church groups in four states about the problem of impaired driving.

Since 2020, Brown is part of All Elite Wrestling events in the Memphis area. On January 8, 2020, Brown participated in All Elite Wrestling: Dynamite events from Southaven, Mississippi, doing play-by-play for the events with Excalibur for AEW Dark, as the event was declared "A Tribute to Memphis Wrestling" with appearances by legends and off-spring of deceased wrestling legends of professional wrestling in the Memphis area. For the main Dynamite program, he called the opening match. Brown returned on the October 21, 2023 AEW Collision, where he called the Eddie Kingston vs Jeff Jarrett Memphis Street Fight at the FedEx Forum.

== Personal life ==
Brown married Margaret Bramblett Brown in December of 1967. Together they have three daughters.

== Awards ==
- Memphis Wrestling Hall of Fame
  - Class of 2017

== See also ==
- United States Wrestling Association
- Power Pro Wrestling
- Continental Wrestling Association
