= NWA World Tag Team Championship (Mid-America version) =

Professional wrestling tag team championship

- The Mid-America version of the championship

Details
- Promotion: NWA Mid-America^{[G1][G2]}
- Date established: February 5, 1957^{[G1][G2]}
- Date retired: 1977^{[G1][G2]}
Statistics
- First champions: The Corsicans (Corsica Joe and Corsica Jean)^{[G1][G2]}
- Most reigns: As a team: The Von Brauners (Kurt and Karl Von Brauner) (12 reigns)^{[G1][G2]} Individually Len Rossi (17 reigns)^{[G1][G2]}

The Mid-America version of the NWA World Tag Team Championship was a regional professional wrestling championship for tag teams that was used in the National Wrestling Alliance's (NWA) NWA Mid-America professional wrestling promotion from 1957 until 1977.^{[G1][G2]} The championship, promoted by Nick Gulas, was one of many NWA World Tag Team Championships in existence in the period between 1949 and 1992, each of which was a regional championship restricted to an NWA territory and not a true "world" championship. At one point in 1957 there were at least 13 different, concurrently promoted NWA World Tag Team Championships across the United States.^{[Championships]} The Mid-America version was in use for 20 years, the second longest of any of the NWA World Tag Team Championships of that era, only behind the Central States version. Being a professional wrestling championship, the NWA World Tag Team Championship was not won or lost in competitive matches, but determined by the decision of the bookers of NWA Mid-America.

The Mid-America version was primarily defended in the Tennessee/Alabama territory, occasionally also being defended in surrounding states. The first recognized champions of the Mid-America branch of the championship were the Corsicans (Corsica Joe and Corsica Jean), who were presented as champions on February 5, 1957. Records do not specify if the team won a tournament of if they were simply awarded the championship by promoter Nick Gulas.^{[G1][G2]} There were at least 148 championship reigns between 1957 and 1977, when the championship was abandoned, split between 77 different teams and a total of 99 individual wrestlers. Mike Graham and Kevin Sullivan were the last Mid-America-recognized NWA World Tag Team Champions, having won the championship in April 1977, a short time before NWA Mid-America abandoned the championship.^{[G1][G2]} At that point the NWA Mid-America Tag Team Championship became the main championship in the territory.

The reign of Len Rossi and Bearcat Brown from October 2, 1969, until some time in May 1970, lasted at least 211 days and possibly as long as 241 days, making it the longest individual reign on record. The Von Brauners (Kurt Von Brauner and Karl Von Brauner) hold the records for most championship reigns, a total of 17 reigns that combined to at least 510 days, probably more.^{[G1][G2]} (Note: Due to lack of information of many of the Von Brauners' reigns, it is impossible to determine the length of most of them; the 510 days represent the minimum number of days possible.) Karl Von Brauner also held the championship with Luke Graham, making his 18 individual championship reigns the most of any wrestler. Due to lack of detail on a multiple championship reigns, it is impossible to determine which team had the shortest reign; the shortest confirmed reign of seven days belonged to Yvon Robert and Billy Wicks, who held the championship from January 5 to January 12, 1959.^{[G1][G2]}

== Title history ==
Key
No.	Overall reign number
Reign	Reign number for the specific team—reign numbers for the individuals are in parentheses, if different
Days	Number of days held

No.	Champion	Championship change			Reign statistics		Notes	Ref.
No.	Champion	Date	Event	Location	Reign	Days	Notes	Ref.
1	The Corsicans (Corsica Joe and Corsica Jean)	February 5, 1957	GCCW show	(Note: The location of the match was not captured as part of the championship documentation.)	1	(Note: The date the championship was lost has not been documented which means the championship reign lasted anywhere between 85 days and 115 days.)		^{[G1][G2]}
2	The Fabulous Fargos (Jackie Fargo and Don Fargo)	May 1957	GCCW show		1	(Note: The date the championship was won and lost has not been documented which means the championship reign lasted anywhere between 1 day and 36 days.)		^{[G1][G2]}
3	The Corsicans (Corsica Joe and Corsica Jean)	June 6, 1957 (NLT)	GCCW show		2	(Note: The date the championship was won and lost has not been documented which means the championship reign lasted anywhere between 1 day and 60 days.)		^{[G1][G2]}
4	The Fabulous Fargos (Jackie Fargo and Don Fargo)	June 1957	GCCW show		2	(Note: The date the championship was won has not been documented which means the championship reign lasted anywhere between 23 days and 52 days.)	Sometime between June 7 and 11, 1957	^{[G1][G2]}
5	The Corsicans (Corsica Joe and Corsica Jean)	July 23, 1957	GCCW show	Nashville, Tennessee	3	13		^{[G1][G2]}
6	The Fabulous Fargos (Jackie Fargo and Don Fargo)	August 5, 1957	GCCW show		3	(Note: The date the championship was lost has not been documented which means the championship reign lasted anywhere between 1 day and 12 days.)		^{[G1][G2]}
7	The Corsicans (Corsica Joe and Corsica Jean)	August 17, 1957 (NLT)	GCCW show		4	(Note: The date the championship was won and lost as not been documented which means the championship reign lasted anywhere between 45 days and 75 days.)	Sometime between August 18 and 29, 1957	^{[G1][G2]}
—	Vacated	April 1965	—	—	—	—	Championship vacated due to Kurt Von Brauner being injured and unable to defend the championship.	^{[G1][G2]}
8	The Corsicans (Corsica Joe and Corsica Jean)	October 1957	GCCW show		5	(Note: The date the championship was won has not been documented which means the championship reign lasted anywhere between 1 days and 8 days.)		^{[G1][G2]}
9	Lee Fields and Mario Galento	October 9, 1957	GCCW show	Mobile, Alabama	1	7		^{[G1][G2]}
10	The Fabulous Fargos (Jackie Fargo and Don Fargo)	October 16, 1957	GCCW show	Mobile, Alabama	4	113		^{[G1][G2]}
11	Lee Fields (2) and Lester Welch	February 6, 1958	GCCW show	Hattiesburg, Mississippi	1	20		^{[G1][G2]}
12	The Fabulous Fargos (Jackie Fargo and Don Fargo)	February 26, 1958	GCCW show	Mobile, Alabama	4	83		^{[G1][G2]}
13	Tex Riley and Len Rossi	May 20, 1958	GCCW show		1	91		^{[G1][G2]}
14	Mike and Doc Gallagher	August 19, 1958	GCCW show		1	44		^{[G1][G2]}
15	The Corsicans (Corsica Joe and Corsica Jean)	October 2, 1958	GCCW show	Chattanooga, Tennessee	6	50		^{[G1][G2]}
16	The Fabulous Fargos (Jackie Fargo and Don Fargo)	November 21, 1958	GCCW show		5	(Note: The date the championship was lost has not been documented which means the championship reign lasted anywhere between 10 days and 40 days.)		^{[G1][G2]}
17	The Corsicans (Corsica Joe and Corsica Jean)	December 1958	GCCW show		7	(Note: The date the championship was won has not been documented which means the championship reign lasted anywhere between 5 days and 35 days.)		^{[G1][G2]}
18	Yvon Robert and Billy Wicks	January 5, 1959	GCCW show	Memphis, Tennessee	1	7		^{[G1][G2]}
19	The Corsicans (Corsica Joe and Corsica Jean)	January 12, 1959	GCCW show	Memphis, Tennessee	8	38		^{[G1][G2]}
20	Don and Luke Fields	February 19, 1959	GCCW show	Chattanooga, Tennessee	1	57		^{[G1][G2]}
—	Vacated	April 17, 1959	—	—	—	—	Championship held up after a match against Corsica Joe and Corsica Jean ended as a no contest.	^{[G1][G2]}
21	Don and Luke Fields	April 24, 1959	GCCW show	Florence, Alabama	2	172	Defeated the Corsicas in rematch.	^{[G1][G2]}
22	The Heavenly Bodies (Don and Al Greene)	October 13, 1959	GCCW show	Nashville, Tennessee	1	13		^{[G1][G2]}
23	Don and Luke Fields	October 26, 1959	GCCW show	Birmingham, Alabama	3	25		^{[G1][G2]}
24	The Fabulous Fargos (Jackie Fargo and Don Fargo)	November 20, 1959	GCCW show	Birmingham, Alabama	6	43		^{[G1][G2]}
25	The Heavenly Bodies (Don and Al Greene)	January 2, 1960	GCCW show		2	12		^{[G1][G2]}
26	The Fabulous Fargos (Jackie Fargo and Don Fargo)	January 14, 1960	GCCW show		7	5		^{[G1][G2]}
27	Tex Riley and Len Rossi	January 19, 1960	GCCW show	Nashville, Tennessee	2	70		^{[G1][G2]}
28	The Von Brauners (Kurt and Karl Von Brauner)	March 29, 1960	GCCW show	Nashville, Tennessee	1	34		^{[G1][G2]}
29	Mike Clancy and Oni Wiki Wiki	May 2, 1960	GCCW show	Birmingham, Alabama	1	49		^{[G1][G2]}
30	Tor Yamata and Mr. Moto	June 20, 1960	GCCW show	Birmingham, Alabama	1	106		^{[G1][G2]}
—	Vacated	October 4, 1960	—	—	—	—	Championship held up after a match against Herb Welch and Lester Welch.	^{[G1][G2]}
31	Bob(6) and Don Fields	June 27, 1960	GCCW show		4	7	Defeated Kurt Von Brauner and Karl Von Brauner for the championship. Bobby Fields was previously billed as "Luke Fields".	^{[G1][G2]}
32	The Von Brauners (Kurt and Karl Von Brauner)	July 4, 1960	GCCW show		2	96		^{[G1][G2]}
33	Lester (2) and Herb Welch	October 18, 1960	GCCW show	Nashville, Tennessee	1	21		^{[G1][G2]}
34	Tor Yamata and Mr. Moto	November 8, 1960	GCCW show	Nashville, Tennessee	2	11		^{[G1][G2]}
35	The Heavenly Bodies (Don and Al Greene)	November 19, 1960	GCCW show	Chattanooga, Tennessee	3	79		^{[G1][G2]}
36	Lester Welch (3) and Joe Scarpa	February 16, 1961	GCCW show	Knoxville, Tennessee	1	56		^{[G1][G2]}
—	Vacated	April 13, 1961	—	—	—	—	Championship held up after a match against Sputnik Monroe and Rocket Monroe.	^{[G1][G2]}
37	Lester Welch (4) and Joe Scarpa	April 20, 1961	GCCW show	Chattanooga, Tennessee	2	(Note: The date the championship was lost has not been documented which means the championship reign lasted anywhere between 5 days and 38 days.)	Won the rematch.	^{[G1][G2]}
38	The Fabulous Fargos (Jackie Fargo (7) and Joe Fargo)	May 28, 1961 (NLT)	GCCW show		1	(Note: The date the championship was won has not been documented which means the championship reign lasted anywhere between 1 day and 34 days.)	Sometime between April 25, 1961 and May 25, 1961	^{[G1][G2]}
39	Lester Welch (5) and Joe Scarpa	May 29, 1961	GCCW show	Birmingham, Alabama	2	(Note: The date the championship was won has not been documented which means the championship reign lasted anywhere between 1 day and 216 days.)		^{[G1][G2]}
—	Vacated	1961	—	—	—	—	Championship vacated and inactive for a period of time.	^{[G1][G2]}
40	The Von Brauners (Kurt and Karl Von Brauner)	May 1964	N/A	N/A	3	(Note: The date the championship was won has not been documented which means the championship reign lasted anywhere between 71 days and 101 days.)	Awarded the championship when it was brought back.	^{[G1][G2]}
41	Perez and Tojo Yamamoto	August 10, 1964	GCCW show	Memphis, Tennessee	1	14		^{[G1][G2]}
42	The Von Brauners (Kurt and Karl Von Brauner)	August 24, 1964	GCCW show	Memphis, Tennessee	4	22		^{[G1][G2]}
—	Vacated	September 15, 1964	—	—	—	—	Championship vacated after a match against Tojo Yamamoto and Alex Perez	^{[G1][G2]}
43	The Von Brauners (Kurt and Karl Von Brauner)	September 29, 1964	GCCW show	Nashville, Tennessee	5	16	Won the rematch	^{[G1][G2]}
44	Perez (2) and Joe Scarpa (3)	October 15, 1964	GCCW show	Chattanooga, Tennessee	1	14		^{[G1][G2]}
45	The Von Brauners (Kurt and Karl Von Brauner)	October 29, 1964	GCCW show	Chattanooga, Tennessee	6	(Note: The date the championship was lost has not been documented which means the championship reign lasted anywhere between 123 days and 153 days.)		^{[G1][G2]}
—	Vacated	March 1965	—	—	—	—	Championship vacated as the NWA orders tournament after a match against Wilbur Snyder and Jackie Fargo.	^{[G1][G2]}
46	Jackie Fargo (8) and Mario Milano	March 9, 1965	GCCW show	Nashville, Tennessee	1	35	Won a 3-team tournament.	^{[G1][G2]}
47	The Von Brauners (Kurt and Karl Von Brauner)	April 13, 1965	GCCW show	Nashville, Tennessee	7	(Note: The date the championship was lost has not been documented which means the championship reign lasted anywhere between 1 day and 15 days.)		^{[G1][G2]}
		April 1965	N/A	N/A	N/A		Championship vacated due to Kurt Von Brauner being injured and unable to defend the championship.	^{[G1][G2]}
48	Tojo Yamamoto (2) and Mitsu Hirai	April 29, 1965	GCCW show	Chattanooga, Tennessee	1	(Note: The date the championship was won has not been documented which means the championship reign lasted anywhere between 2 days and 5 days.)	Won a 3-team tournament.	^{[G1][G2]}
—	Vacated	May 1965	—	—	—	—	Championship vacated for undocumented reasons	^{[G1][G2]}
49	The Von Brauners (Kurt and Karl Von Brauner)	May 4, 1965	GCCW show		8	(Note: The date the championship was won and lost has not been documented which means the championship reign lasted anywhere between 120 days and 149 days.)	Records are unclear as to how they won the championship	^{[G1][G2]}
—	Vacated	September 1965	—	—	—	—	Championship vacated for undocumented reasons	^{[G1][G2]}
50	Eddie Graham and Sammy Steamboat	September 21, 1965 (NLT)	N/A	N/A	1	(Note: The date the championship was won has not been documented which means the championship reign lasted anywhere between 20 days and 40 days.)	Awarded (announced as having won fictitious tournament)	^{[G1][G2]}
51	Tojo Yamamoto (3) and Perez	October 11, 1965	GCCW show	Memphis, Tennessee	2	14		^{[G1][G2]}
52	Eddie Graham and Sammy Steamboat	October 25, 1965	GCCW show	Memphis, Tennessee	2	91		^{[G1][G2]}
53	Hiro Matsuda and Kanji Inoki	January 24, 1966	GCCW show	Memphis, Tennessee	1	(Note: The date the championship was vacated has not been documented which means the championship reign lasted anywhere between 8 days and 35 days.)		^{[G1][G2]}
—	Vacated	February 1966	—	—	—	—	Announced as Inoki having broken his leg; Inoki returns to Japan where Inoki and Matsuda form Tokyo Pro Wrestling and bill themselves as the NWA World Tag Team Champions.	^{[G1][G2]}
54	Herb Welch (2) and Al Costello	May 30, 1966	GCCW show	Nashville, Tennessee	1	65	Won a tournament by defeating Karl and Eric von Brauner in the finals.	^{[G1][G2]}
55	Karl Von Brauner (9) and Luke Graham	August 3, 1966	GCCW show	Nashville, Tennessee	1	21		^{[G1][G2]}
56	Moose and Giant Evans	August 24, 1966	GCCW show	Nashville, Tennessee	1	43		^{[G1][G2]}
57	Tojo Yamamoto (4) and Tamaya Soto	October 6, 1966	GCCW show	Chattanooga, Tennessee	1	14		^{[G1][G2]}
58	Tojo Yamamoto (4) and Professor Ito	October 20, 1966	N/A	N/A	1	102	Soto gave his half to Professor Ito.	^{[G1][G2]}
59	Jackie Fargo (8) and Herb Welch	January 30, 1967	GCCW show	Memphis, Tennessee	1	7		^{[G1][G2]}
60	Tojo Yamamoto (5) and Professor Ito	February 6, 1967	GCCW show	Memphis, Tennessee	2	30		^{[G1][G2]}
61	Jackie Fargo (9) and Len Rossi (3)	March 8, 1967	GCCW show	Nashville, Tennessee	1	8		^{[G1][G2]}
—	Vacated	March 16, 1967	—	—	—	—	Championship vacated after an inconclusive match against the Blue Infernos	^{[G1][G2]}
62	The Blue Infernos (Blue Inferno #1 and Blue Inferno #2)	March 23, 1967	GCCW show	Chattanooga, Tennessee	1	35	Won a tournament.	^{[G1][G2]}
63	Billy and Jimmy Hines	April 27, 1967	GCCW show	Chattanooga, Tennessee	1	14		^{[G1][G2]}
64	The Blue Infernos (Blue Inferno #1 and Blue Inferno #2)	May 11, 1967	GCCW show	Chattanooga, Tennessee	2	16		^{[G1][G2]}
65	Billy and Jimmy Hines	May 27, 1967	GCCW show	Chattanooga, Tennessee	2	35		^{[G1][G2]}
66	Tamaya Soto (2) and Great Yamaha	July 1, 1967	GCCW show	Chattanooga, Tennessee	1	(Note: The date the championship was lost has not been documented which means the championship reign lasted anywhere between 1 day and 26 days.)		^{[G1][G2]}
67	Billy and Jimmy Hines	July 27, 1967 (NLT)	GCCW show		3	(Note: The date the championship was won and lost has not been documented which means the championship reign lasted anywhere between 1 days and 30 days.)	Sometime after July 15, 1967	^{[G1][G2]}
—	Vacated	July 1967	—	—	—	—	Championship vacated sometime after July 27, 1967 when Billy Hines is hospitalized	^{[G1][G2]}
68	Don and Ron Carson	August 9, 1967	GCCW show	Nashville, Tennessee	1	36	Defeated Jackie Fargo and Len Rossi.	^{[G1][G2]}
69	Billy and Jimmy Hines	September 14, 1967	GCCW show	Chattanooga, Tennessee	4	(Note: The date the championship was lost has not been documented which means the championship reign lasted anywhere between 17 days and 47 days.)		^{[G1][G2]}
70	Motoshi Okuma and Great Kojika	October 1967	GCCW show		1	(Note: The date the championship was won and lost has not been documented which means the championship reign lasted anywhere between 31 days and 91 days.)		^{[G1][G2]}
71	Len Rossi (4) and Tamaya Soto (3)	December 1967	GCCW show		1	(Note: The date the championship was won has not been documented which means the championship reign lasted anywhere between 64 days and 94 days.)		^{[G1][G2]}
72	The Mighty Yankees (Mighty Yankee #1 and Mighty Yankee #2)	March 14, 1968	GCCW show	Chattanooga, Tennessee	1	(Note: The date the championship was lost has not been documented which means the championship reign lasted anywhere between 79 days and 108 days.)		^{[G1][G2]}
73	Len Rossi (5) and Tamaya Soto (4)	June 1968	GCCW show		2	(Note: The date the championship was won has not been documented which means the championship reign lasted anywhere between 9 days and 38 days.)		^{[G1][G2]}
74	The Mighty Yankees (Mighty Yankee #1 and Mighty Yankee #2)	July 9, 1968	GCCW show	Birmingham, Alabama	2	25		^{[G1][G2]}
—	Vacated	August 3, 1968	—	—	—	—	Championship held up after a match against Dennis Hall and Ken Lucas.	^{[G1][G2]}
75	Ken Luchas and Dennis Hall	August 3, 1968	GCCW show	Chattanooga, Tennessee	1	14		^{[G1][G2]}
76	The Mighty Yankees (Mighty Yankee #1 and Mighty Yankee #2)	August 17, 1968	GCCW show	Chattanooga, Tennessee	3	(Note: The date the championship was lost has not been documented which means the championship reign lasted anywhere between 15 days and 44 days.)		^{[G1][G2]}
77	Len Rossi (6) and Johnny Walker	September 1968	GCCW show		1	(Note: The date the championship was won has not been documented which means the championship reign lasted anywhere between 44 days and 73 days.)		^{[G1][G2]}
78	Tojo Yamamoto (5) and Johnny Long	November 13, 1968	GCCW show	Birmingham, Alabama	1	15		^{[G1][G2]}
79	Les Thatcher and Dennis Hall (2)	November 28, 1968	GCCW show	Chattanooga, Tennessee	1	16		^{[G1][G2]}
80	Tojo Yamamoto (6) and Johnny Long	December 14, 1968	GCCW show		2	(Note: The date the championship was lost has not been documented which means the championship reign lasted anywhere between 49 days and 75 days.)		^{[G1][G2]}
81	Len Rossi (7) and Don Carson (2)	February 1969	GCCW show		1	(Note: The date the championship was won and vacated has not been documented which means the championship reign lasted anywhere between 1 day and 26 days.)	Sometime between February 20 and 26, 1969	^{[G1][G2]}
—	Vacated	February 1969	—	—	—	—	Championship held up after match against Yamamoto and Long.	^{[G1][G2]}
82	Tojo Yamamoto (7) and Johnny Long	February 27, 1969	GCCW show	Chattanooga, Tennessee	3	14		^{[G1][G2]}
83	Len Rossi (8) and Don Carson (3)	March 13, 1969	GCCW show	Chattanooga, Tennessee	2	44		^{[G1][G2]}
84	The Great Mephisto and Dante	April 26, 1969	GCCW show	Chattanooga, Tennessee	1	(Note: The date the championship was lost has not been documented which means the championship reign lasted anywhere between 1 day and 56 days.)		^{[G1][G2]}
85	Len Rossi (9) and Johnny Walker (2)	1969	GCCW show		2	(Note: The date the championship was won and lost has not been documented which means the championship reign lasted anywhere between 1 day and 55 days.)		^{[G1][G2]}
86	The Great Mephisto and Dante	1969	GCCW show		2	(Note: The date the championship was lost has not been documented which means the championship reign lasted anywhere between 1 day and 54 days.)		^{[G1][G2]}
87	Johnny Walker (2) and Bearcat Brown	June 21, 1969	GCCW show	Chattanooga, Tennessee	1	7		^{[G1][G2]}
88	The Great Mephisto and Dante	June 28, 1969	GCCW show	Chattanooga, Tennessee	3	7		^{[G1][G2]}
89	Johnny Walker (3) and Bearcat Brown	July 5, 1969	GCCW show	Chattanooga, Tennessee	2	(Note: The date the championship was won has not been documented which means the championship reign lasted anywhere between 58 days and 77 days.)		^{[G1][G2]}
—		N/A	—	—				
90	The Spoilers (Spoiler #1 and Spoiler #2)	September 1969	GCCW show		1	(Note: The date the championship was won and lost has not been documented which means the championship reign lasted anywhere between 1 day and 19 days.)		^{[G1][G2]}
91	Len Rossi (10) and Bearcat Brown	September 20, 1969	GCCW show	Chattanooga, Tennessee	1	12		^{[G1][G2]}
92	The Spoilers (Spoiler #1 and Spoiler #2)	October 2, 1969	GCCW show	Chattanooga, Tennessee	2	0		^{[G1][G2]}
93	Len Rossi (11) and Bearcat Brown (3)	October 2, 1969	GCCW show	Chattanooga, Tennessee	1	(Note: The date the championship was lost has not been documented which means the championship reign lasted anywhere between 211 days and 241 days.)		^{[G1][G2]}
—		N/A	—	—				
94	Big Bad John and Pepe Lopez	May 1970	GCCW show		1	(Note: The date the championship was won has not been documented which means the championship reign lasted anywhere between 110 days and 140 days.)		^{[G1][G2]}
95	The Mystery Men (Mystery Man #1 (12) and Mystery Man #2 (Note: Mystery Man #2 was Dennis Hall who had previously held the championship twice before))	September 18, 1970	GCCW show	Nashville, Tennessee	1	(Note: The date the championship was lost has not been documented which means the championship reign lasted anywhere between 1 day and 12 days.)		^{[G1][G2]}
—		N/A	—	—				
96	Len Rossi (13) and Bearcat Brown	September 1970	GCCW show		1	(Note: The date the championship was won has not been documented which means the championship reign lasted anywhere between 1 day and 30 days.)		^{[G1][G2]}
97	The Continental Warriors (Bobby Hart and Lorenzo Parente)	October 1, 1970	GCCW show	Chattanooga, Tennessee	1	4		^{[G1][G2]}
98	Len Rossi (14) and Bearcat Brown	October 15, 1970	GCCW show	Chattanooga, Tennessee	2	(Note: The date the championship was lost has not been documented which means the championship reign lasted anywhere between 1 day and 39 days.)		^{[G1][G2]}
99	Big Bad John and Pepe Lopez	November 23, 1970 (NLT)	GCCW show		1	(Note: The date the championship was won has not been documented which means the championship reign lasted anywhere between 14 days and 52 days.)		^{[G1][G2]}
100	Oni Wiki Wiki (2) and Mighty Atlas	December 7, 1970	GCCW show		1	(Note: The date the championship was won has not been documented which means the championship reign lasted anywhere between 1 day and 3 days.)		^{[G1][G2]}
101	The Continental Warriors (Bobby Hart and Lorenzo Parente)	December 10, 1970 (NLT)	GCCW show		2	(Note: The date the championship was won has not been documented which means the championship reign lasted anywhere between 6 days and 8 days.)		^{[G1][G2]}
102	Oni Wiki Wiki (3) and Mighty Atlas	December 16, 1970	GCCW show	Nashville, Tennessee	2	(Note: The date the championship was lost has not been documented which means the championship reign lasted anywhere between 47 days and 74 days.)		^{[G1][G2]}
103	The Continental Warriors (Bobby Hart and Lorenzo Parente)	February 1971	GCCW show		3	(Note: The date the championship was won has not been documented which means the championship reign lasted anywhere between 6 days and 33 days.)		^{[G1][G2]}
104	Jimmy Golden and Dennis Hall (4)	March 6, 1971	GCCW show	Chattanooga, Tennessee	1	14		^{[G1][G2]}
105	The Continental Warriors (Bobby Hart and Lorenzo Parente)	March 20, 1971	GCCW show	Chattanooga, Tennessee	3	7		^{[G1][G2]}
106	The Masked Avengers (Masked Avenger #1 (5) and Masked Avenger #1)	March 27, 1971	GCCW show	Chattanooga, Tennessee	2	28	Dennis Hall was the Masked Avenger #1, Jimmy Golden was the Masked Avenger #2	^{[G1][G2]}
107	The Alaskans (Mike York and Frank Monte)	April 24, 1971	GCCW show		1	(Note: The date the championship was won has not been documented which means the championship reign lasted anywhere between 1 day and 18 days.)		^{[G1][G2]}
—		N/A	—	—				
108	The Von Brauners (Kurt and Karl Von Brauner(10))	May 12, 1971 (NLT)	GCCW show		9	(Note: The date the championship was won has not been documented which means the championship reign lasted anywhere between 7 days and 25 days.)		^{[G1][G2]}
109	Big Bad John (3) and Omar Atlaz	May 19, 1971	GCCW show		1	10		^{[G1][G2]}
110	The Von Brauners (Kurt and Karl Von Brauner (11))	May 29, 1971	GCCW show		10	14		^{[G1][G2]}
111	Jackie Fargo (10) and Jerry Jarrett	June 12, 1971	GCCW show	Chattanooga, Tennessee	1	7		^{[G1][G2]}
112	The Von Brauners (Kurt and Karl Von Brauner (9))	June 19, 1971	GCCW show	Chattanooga, Tennessee	8	44		^{[G1][G2]}
113	Len Rossi (15) and Bearcat Brown (5)	August 2, 1971	GCCW show	Birmingham, Alabama	3	(Note: The date the championship was lost has not been documented which means the championship reign lasted anywhere between 1 day and 14 days.)		^{[G1][G2]}
114	The Von Brauners (Kurt and Karl Von Brauner (12))	August 16, 1971 (NLT)	GCCW show		11	(Note: The date the championship was won has not been documented which means the championship reign lasted anywhere between 19 days and 33 days.)		^{[G1][G2]}
115	Jackie Fargo(11) and Robert Fuller	September 4, 1971	GCCW show	Chattanooga, Tennessee	1	(Note: The date the championship was won and lost has not been documented which means the championship reign lasted anywhere between 1 day and 87 days.)		^{[G1][G2]}
116	The Von Brauners (Kurt and Karl Von Brauner (13))	1971	GCCW show		12	(Note: The date the championship was won and lost has not been documented which means the championship reign lasted anywhere between 1 day and 86 days.)		^{[G1][G2]}
117	Stan Frazier and Dennis Hall (6)	1971	GCCW show		1	(Note: The date the championship was won and lost has not been documented which means the championship reign lasted anywhere between 1 day and 85 days.)		^{[G1][G2]}
118	The Von Brauners (Kurt and Karl Von Brauner (14))	1971	GCCW show		13	(Note: The date the championship was won and lost has not been documented which means the championship reign lasted anywhere between 1 day and 84 days.)		^{[G1][G2]}
119	The Interns (Intern #1 and Intern #2)	November 1971	GCCW show		1	(Note: The date the championship was won and lost has not been documented which means the championship reign lasted anywhere between 1 day and 60 days.)		^{[G1][G2]}
120	Len Rossi (16) and Bearcat Brown (6)	1971	GCCW show	Birmingham, Alabama	4	(Note: The date the championship was won and lost has not been documented which means the championship reign lasted anywhere between 1 day and 59 days.)		^{[G1][G2]}
121	The Heavenly Bodies (Don and Al Greene)	December 1971	GCCW show		4	(Note: The date the championship was won and lost has not been documented which means the championship reign lasted anywhere between 85 days and 115 days.)		^{[G1][G2]}
122	Len Rossi (17) and Bearcat Brown (7)	March 25, 1972	GCCW show	Chattanooga, Tennessee	5	(Note: The date the championship was lost has not been documented which means the championship reign lasted anywhere between 1 day and 60 days.)		^{[G1][G2]}
—		N/A	—	—				
123	The Von Brauners (Kurt and Karl Von Brauner (15))	1972	GCCW show		14	(Note: The date the championship was lost has not been documented which means the championship reign lasted anywhere between 1 day and 59 days.)		^{[G1][G2]}
124	Robert Fuller and Kevin Sullivan	May 24, 1972	GCCW show	Nashville, Tennessee	1	7		^{[G1][G2]}
125	The Von Brauners (Kurt and Karl Von Brauner (16))	May 31, 1972	GCCW show	Nashville, Tennessee	15	47		^{[G1][G2]}
126	Robert Fuller (2) and Sputnik Monroe	July 17, 1972	GCCW show	Memphis, Tennessee	1	3		^{[G1][G2]}
127	The Von Brauners (Kurt and Karl Von Brauner (17))	July 20, 1972	GCCW show	Florence, Alabama	16	11		^{[G1][G2]}
128	Robert Fuller (3) and Sputnik Monroe	July 31, 1972	GCCW show		2	(Note: The date the championship was lost has not been documented which means the championship reign lasted anywhere between 1 day and 27 days.)		^{[G1][G2]}
—		N/A	—	—				
129	The Heavenly Bodies (Don and Al Greene)	August 1972	GCCW show		5	(Note: The date the championship was lost has not been documented which means the championship reign lasted anywhere between 1 day and 27 days.)		^{[G1][G2]}
130	Jackie Fargo (12) and Eddie Marlin	August 28, 1972	GCCW show	Memphis, Tennessee	1	21		^{[G1][G2]}
131	The Heavenly Bodies (Don and Al Greene)	September 18, 1972	GCCW show	Memphis, Tennessee	6	21		^{[G1][G2]}
132	Johnny Walker (4) and Tojo Yamamoto (8)	October 9, 1972	GCCW show	Memphis, Tennessee	1	(Note: The date the championship was won has not been documented which means the championship reign lasted anywhere between 1 day and 67 days.)		^{[G1][G2]}
—		N/A	—	—				
133	The Bounty Hunters (David Novak and Jerry Novak)	1972	GCCW show		1	(Note: The date the championship was won has not been documented which means the championship reign lasted anywhere between 1 day and 67 days.)		^{[G1][G2]}
134	Bearcat Brown (8) and Johnny Walker (5)	December 16, 1972	GCCW show	Chattanooga, Tennessee	1	14		^{[G1][G2]}
135	The Bounty Hunters (David Novak and Jerry Novak)	December 30, 1972	GCCW show	Chattanooga, Tennessee	2	(Note: The date the championship was won has not been documented which means the championship reign lasted anywhere between 1 day and 87 days.)		^{[G1][G2]}
—		N/A	—	—				
136	The Fabulous Kangaroos (Al Costello (2) and Don Kent)	February 1973	GCCW show		1	(Note: The date the championship was won has not been documented which means the championship reign lasted anywhere between 29 days and 56 days.)		^{[G1][G2]}
137	Ben Justice and Tojo Yamamoto (9)	March 29, 1973	GCCW show	Chattanooga, Tennessee	1	(Note: The date the championship was lost has not been documented which means the championship reign lasted anywhere between 3 days and 13 days.)		^{[G1][G2]}
138	The Fabulous Kangaroos (Al Costello (2) and Don Kent)	April 1973	GCCW show		2	(Note: The date the championship was won and lost has not been documented which means the championship reign lasted anywhere between 1 day and 10 days.)		^{[G1][G2]}
139	Ron and Don Wright	April 11, 1973	GCCW show	Knoxville, Tennessee	1	(Note: The date the championship was won has not been documented which means the championship reign lasted anywhere between 1 day and 17 days.)		^{[G1][G2]}
140	The Fabulous Kangaroos (Al Costello (2) and Don Kent)	April 1973	GCCW show		3	(Note: The date the championship was won has not been documented which means the championship reign lasted anywhere between 145 days and 164 days.)		^{[G1][G2]}
141	Randy Curtis and Lorenzo Parente (4)	September 22, 1973	GCCW show	Chattanooga, Tennessee	1	14		^{[G1][G2]}
142	The Interns (Intern #1 and Intern #2)	October 6, 1973	GCCW show		2	33		^{[G1][G2]}
143	Don Greene (7) and Bearcat Brown (9)	November 8, 1973	GCCW show	Chattanooga, Tennessee	1	7		^{[G1][G2]}
144	The Interns (Intern #1 and Intern #2)	November 15, 1973	GCCW show	Chattanooga, Tennessee	3	13		^{[G1][G2]}
145	Randy Curtis and Lorenzo Parente (5)	November 28, 1973	GCCW show	Nashville, Tennessee	2	(Note: The date the championship was lost has not been documented which means the championship reign lasted anywhere between 34 days and 64 days.)		^{[G1][G2]}
146	The Interns (Intern #1 and Intern #2)	January 1974	GCCW show		4	(Note: The date the championship was won and lost has not been documented, which means the championship reign lasted more than 1 day.)		^{[G1][G2]}
—		N/A	—	—				
147	The Disciples (Disciple #1 and Disciple #2)	1974–1976	GCCW show		1	(Note: The date the championship was won and lost has not been documented, which means the championship reign lasted more than 1 day.)		^{[G1][G2]}
—		N/A	—	—				
148	The Untouchables (Karl Von Steiger and Otto Von Heller)	1974–1976	GCCW show		1	(Note: The date the championship was won and lost has not been documented, which means the championship reign lasted more than 1 day.)		^{[G1][G2]}
—		N/A	—	—				
149	The Masked Assassins (Assassin #1 and Assassin #2)	July 1976	GCCW show		1	(Note: The date the championship was won and lost has not been documented which means the championship reign lasted anywhere between 1 day and 61 days.)	Records unclear as to whom they defeated.	^{[G1][G2]}
150	The Masked Superstars (Masked Superstar #1 (Note: This was not Bill Eadie who would later use the same ring name) and Masked Superstar #2)	August 1976	GCCW show		1	(Note: The date the championship was won and lost has not been documented which means the championship reign lasted anywhere between 213 days and 272 days.)		^{[G1][G2]}
—		April 1977	—	—	August 1976			
151	Mike Graham and Kevin Sullivan (2)	April 1977	GCCW show		1	(Note: The date the championship was won and lost has not been documented which means the championship reign lasted anywhere between 1 day and 274 days.)	Records unclear as to whom they defeated.	^{[G1][G2]}
—	Deactivated	1977	N/A	N/A	—	—	Championship abandoned by NWA Mid-America	^{[G1][G2]}

== Team reigns by combined length ==
Key

Symbol	Meaning
¤	The exact length of at least one title reign is uncertain, so the shortest possible length is used.

Rank	Team	No. of reigns	Combined days
1	The Von Brauners (Kurt and Karl Von Brauner)	16	628¤
2	The Fabulous Fargos (Jackie Fargo and Don Fargo)	8	279¤
3	The Corsicans (Corsica Joe and Corsica Jean)	8	238¤
4	Don and Luke Fields	3	234
5	Len Rossi and Bearcat Brown	7	228¤
6	The Masked Superstars (Masked Superstar #1[Note 77] and Masked Superstar #2)	1	213¤
7	The Heavenly Bodies (Don and Al Greene)	6	211¤
8	The Fabulous Kangaroos (Al Costello and Don Kent)	3	174¤
9	Tex Riley and Len Rossi	2	161
10	Tor Yamata and Mr. Moto	3	147
11	Big Bad John and Pepe Lopez	2	124¤
12	The Mighty Yankees (Mighty Yankee #1 and Mighty Yankee #2)	3	119¤
13	Eddie Graham and Sammy Steamboat	2	111¤
14	Tojo Yamamoto and Professor Ito	1	102
15	Tojo Yamamoto and Johnny Long	3	94¤
16	Len Rossi and Tamaya Soto	2	72¤
17	Billy and Jimmy Hines	4	67¤
18	Johnny Walker and Bearcat Brown	2	65¤
19	Herb Welch and Al Costello	1	64
20	Lester Welch and Joe Scarpa	3	62¤
21	The Blue Infernos (Blue Inferno #1 and Blue Inferno #2)	2	51
22	Mike Clancy and Oni Wiki Wiki	1	49
23	The Interns (Intern #1 and Intern #2)	2	48¤
23	Oni Wiki Wiki and Mighty Atlas	4	48¤
25	Randy Curtis and Lorenzo Parente	2	45¤
25	Len Rossi and Don Carson	2	45¤
27	Len Rossi and Johnny Walker	2	44¤
27	Mike and Doc Gallagher	1	44
29	Moose and Giant Evans	1	43
30	Don and Ron Carson	1	36
31	Jackie Fargo and Mario Milano	1	35
32	The Continental Warriors (Bobby Hart and Lorenzo Parente)	4	33¤
33	Motoshi Okuma and Great Kojika	1	31¤
34	The Masked Avengers (Masked Avenger #1 and Masked Avenger #1)	1	28
34	Alex Perez and Tojo Yamamoto	2	28
36	Jackie Fargo and Eddie Marlin	1	21
36	Karl Von Brauner and Luke Graham	1	21
36	Lester and Herb Welch	1	21
39	Lee Fields and Lester Welch	1	20
40	Les Thatcher and Dennis Hall	1	16
44	Bearcat Brown and Johnny Walker	1	14
44	Jimmy Golden and Dennis Hall	1	14
44	Ken Lucas and Dennis Hall	1	14
44	Alex Perez and Joe Scarpa	1	14
44	Tojo Yamamoto and Tamaya Soto	1	14
49	Big Bad John and Omar Atlaz	1	10
50	The Great Mephisto and Dante	3	9¤
51	Jackie Fargo and Len Rossi	1	8¤
51	Hiro Matsuda and Kanji Inoki	1	8
53	Jackie Fargo and Jerry Jarrett	1	7
53	Jackie Fargo and Herb Welch	1	7
53	Bobby and Don Fields	1	7
53	Lee Fields and Mario Galento	1	7
53	Robert Fuller and Kevin Sullivan	1	7
53	Don Greene and Bearcat Brown	1	7
53	Yvon Robert and Billy Wicks	1	7
60	Robert Fuller and Sputnik Monroe	2	4¤
61	Ben Justice and Tojo Yamamoto	1	3¤
62	The Bounty Hunters (David Novak and Jerry Novak)	2	2¤
62	Tojo Yamamoto and Mitsu Hirai	1	2¤
64	The Alaskans (Mike York and Frank Monte)	1	1¤
64	The Disciples (Disciple #1 and Disciple #2)	1	1¤
64	The Fabulous Fargos (Jackie Fargo and Joe Fargo)	1	1¤
64	Jackie Fargo and Robert Fuller	1	1¤
64	Stan Frazier and Dennis Hall	1	1¤
64	Mike Graham and Kevin Sullivan	1	1¤
64	The Masked Assassins (Assassin #1 and Assassin #2)	1	1¤
64	The Mystery Men (Mystery Man #1 and Mystery Man #2)	1	1¤
64	Tamaya Soto and Great Yamaha	1	1¤
64	The Spoilers (Spoiler #1 and Spoiler #2)	1	1¤
64	The Untouchables (Karl Von Steiger and Otto Von Heller)	1	1¤
64	Johnny Walker and Tojo Yamamoto	2	1¤
64	Ron and Don Wright	1	1¤

== Individual reigns by combined length ==
Key

Symbol	Meaning
¤	The exact length of at least one title reign is uncertain, so the shortest possible length is used.

Rank	Wrestler	No. of reigns	Combined days
1	Karl Von Brauner	18	630¤
2	Kurt Von Brauner	17	628¤
3	Len Rossi	16	558¤
4	Jackie Fargo	15	359¤
5	Bearcat Brown	11	314¤
6	Don Fargo	8	279¤
7	Tojo Yamamoto	11	244¤
8	Don Fields	4	241
9	Al Costello	4	238¤
9	Corsica Jean	8	238¤
9	Corsica Joe	8	238¤
12	Luke Fields	3	234
13	Don Greene	7	218¤
14	Masked Superstar #1	1	213¤
14	Masked Superstar #2	1	213¤
16	Al Greene	6	211¤
17	Don Kent	3	174¤
18	Tex Riley	2	161
19	Mr. Moto	3	147
19	Tor Yamata	3	147
21	Big Bad John	3	134¤
22	Pepe Lopez	2	124¤
22	Johnny Walker	7	124¤
24	Mighty Yankee #1	3	119¤
24	Mighty Yankee #2	3	119¤
26	Eddie Graham	2	111¤
26	Sammy Steamboat	2	111¤
28	Lester Welch	5	103¤
29	Professor Ito	1	102
30	Oni Wiki Wiki	5	97¤
31	Johnny Long	3	94¤
32	Herb Welch	3	92
32	Tamaya Soto	4	87¤
34	Don Carson	3	81¤
35	Lorenzo Parente	6	78¤
36	Joe Scarpa	4	76¤
37	Dennis Hall/Masked Avenger #2	5	73¤
38	Billy Hines	4	67¤
38	Jimmy Hines	4	67¤
40	Blue Inferno #1	2	51
40	Blue Inferno #2	2	51
42	Mike Clancy	1	49
43	Intern #1	2	48¤
43	Intern #2	2	48¤
43	Mighty Atlas	4	48¤
46	Randy Curtis	2	45¤
47	Doc Gallagher	1	44
47	Mike Gallagher	1	44
49	Giant Evans	1	43
49	Moose Evans	1	43
51	Jimmy Golden/Masked Avenger #2	2	42
51	Alex Perez	3	42
53	Ron Carson	1	36
54	Mario Milano	1	35
55	Bobby Hart	4	33¤
56	Great Kojika	1	31¤
56	Motoshi Okuma	1	31¤
58	Lee Fields	2	27
59	Luke Graham	1	21
59	Eddie Marlin	1	21
61	Les Thatcher	1	16
62	Ken Lucas	1	14
63	Robert Fuller	4	12¤
64	Omar Atlaz	1	10
65	Dante	3	9¤
65	The Great Mephist	3	9¤
67	Kevin Sullivan	2	8¤
67	Kanji Inoki	1	8
67	Hiro Matsuda	1	8
70	Bobby Fields	1	7
70	Mario Galento	1	7
70	Jerry Jarrett	1	7
70	Yvon Robert	1	7
70	Billy Wicks	1	7
75	Sputnik Monroe	2	4¤
76	Ben Justice	1	3¤
77	Mitsu Hirai	1	2¤
77	David Novak	2	2¤
77	Jerry Novak	2	2¤
80	Disciple #1	1	1¤
80	Disciple #2	1	1¤
80	Joe Fargo	1	1¤
80	Stan Frazier	1	1¤
80	Mike Graham	1	1¤
80	Great Yamaha	1	1¤
80	Masked Assassin #1	1	1¤
80	Masked Assassin #2	1	1¤
80	Frank Monte	1	1¤
80	Mystery Man #1	1	1¤
80	Mystery Man #2	1	1¤
80	Spoiler #1	1	1¤
80	Spoiler #2	1	1¤
80	Otto Von Heller	1	1¤
80	Karl Von Steiger	1	1¤
80	Don Wright	1	1¤
80	Ron Wright	1	1¤
80	Mike York	1	1¤

== See also ==
- List of NWA Championships

== Concurrent championships ==
Sources for 13 simultaneous NWA World Tag Team Championships

- NWA World Tag Team Championship (Los Angeles version)
- NWA World Tag Team Championship (San Francisco version)
- NWA World Tag Team Championship (Central States version)
- NWA World Tag Team Championship (Chicago version)
- NWA World Tag Team Championship (Buffalo Athletic Club version)
- NWA World Tag Team Championship (Georgia version)
- NWA World Tag Team Championship (Iowa/Nebraska version)
- NWA World Tag Team Championship (Indianapolis version)
- NWA World Tag Team Championship (Salt Lake Wrestling Club version)
- NWA World Tag Team Championship (Amarillo version)
- NWA World Tag Team Championship (Minneapolis version)
- NWA World Tag Team Championship (Texas version)
- NWA World Tag Team Championship (Mid-America version)^{[G1][G2]}
