= Corey Maclin =

American journalist (1970–2013)

Maclin

Corey Maclin (May 6, 1970 – July 31, 2013) was an American television broadcaster, announcer, play-by-play commentator and politician, best known for his work in the Memphis, Tennessee area as a television sports reporter and professional wrestling announcer.

== Biography ==
He was best known for working as a sports reporter at WMC-TV in Memphis, Tennessee. While he was there, he also worked as the cohost with Dave Brown of the United States Wrestling Association. He later served as a ring announcer at USWA, when Lance Russell rejoined the organization. Starting his broadcasting career at the age of 16, he began working at 107.1 KFTH-FM (Now KXHT), where he did a weekend gospel show. While attending high school, he went from working in the radio business only on weekends to working six nights a week. At the age of 18, he left KFTH and began working at WLOK, where he served as the youngest program director ever at the station. At the age of 22, he began working with Dave Brown in color commentary at USWA Championship Wrestling (a position he would hold for 6 years, until USWA ceased operations in November 1997). Maclin left WMC-TV a year later to become advertising director for The Memphis Silver Star News. Later, he launched his own company, Corey Maclin & Associates, a full-service advertising agency for clients in and out of Memphis and Shelby County.

In 1999, he took over as president/CEO of the relaunched Memphis Wrestling promotion and was in charge of all day-to-day operations including television production, talent relations, marketing, budgeting and a host of other duties. On July 10, 2004, Maclin teamed with Kamala in a no contest against Jerry Lawler and Jimmy Hart at Memphis Wrestling Throwback Night. This would be Maclin's only televised match. Corey Maclin ran for County Clerk of Shelby County, Tennessee, in 2010, but lost. He worked at WPTY-TV (now WATN-TV), where he was an on-site reporter. On May 2, 2013, (two months before his death), he left WPTY to continue to work for Memphis Wrestling and pursue other opportunities. On July 31, 2013, Maclin was killed in a car crash in Mississippi. The Commercial Appeal reported that Maclin's car rolled over just south of Sardis on Interstate 55 at approximately 10:30 PM. He was 43-years old.
