= Dennis Coralluzzo Invitational =

- Promotion: NWA New Jersey
- Date: September 26, 2009
- City: Wayne, New Jersey
- Venue: Wayne PAL

The Dennis Coralluzzo Invitational was a professional wrestling memorial event produced by the NWA New Jersey (NWA-NJ) promotion, which took place on September 26, 2009, at the Wayne PAL (Police Athletic League) in Wayne, New Jersey; It was held in honor of Dennis Coralluzzo, a longtime New Jersey wrestling promoter and one-time president of the National Wrestling Alliance, who had died on July 30, 2001, after suffering a fatal stroke. As part of the event, his family were present to accept his posthumous introduction to the NWA Hall of Fame. The event was sponsored by Smash Fight Wear, a mixed martial arts equipment manufacturer, and open to the general public free of charge. Twelve professional wrestling matches were featured on the event's card, with two including championships.

The main event was a standard wrestling match of a tournament final for the NWA New Jersey Television Championship between Crowbar and Judas Young, in which Crowbar won the vacant championship. Other participants included Justin Corino, Monsta Mack, Danny Demanto, Dan Maff, B-Boy and Josh Daniels. Another featured match was The Powers of Pain (The Barbarian & The Warlord) versus The Varsity Club (Baby Hughie & Rob Eckos). The vacant NWA New Jersey Television Tag Team Championship was won by Fire Power (Danny Inferno and Jim Powers) after defeating The Spirit Squad (Kenny and Mikey), and Rik Ratchett beat Biggie Biggs. Other wrestlers such as Afa Anoa'i Jr., Lance Cade, and Mike Mondo were among those originally scheduled to appear for the memorial show but later had to cancel their appearance.

== Results ==
September 26, 2009, in Wayne, New Jersey (Wayne PAL)

No.	Results	Stipulations
1	Bandido, Jr. defeated CK Kross	Singles match
2	Jumbo defeated Billy Reil	Tag team match
3	Fire Power (Danny Inferno and Jim Powers) defeated The Spirit Squad (Kenny and Mikey)	Tag team match for the vacant NWA New Jersey Television Tag Team Championship
4	Rik Ratchett defeated Biggie Biggs	Singles match
5	The Powers of Pain (The Barbarian and The Warlord) defeated The Varsity Club (Baby Hughie and Rob Eckos)	Tag team match
6	Crowbar defeated Justin Corino (with Erik Andretti)	First Round Tournament match
7	Judas Young defeated Monsta Mack	First Round Tournament match
8	Danny Demanto and Danny Maff fought to a double-disqualification	First Round Tournament match
9	B-Boy and Josh Daniels fought to a double-countout	First Round Tournament match
10	Dan Maff defeated B-Boy, Danny Demanto and Josh Daniels	Fatal Four Way match; As per the pre-match stipulation, Maff became the number one contender for the NWA New Jersey Television Championship.
–	Crowbar received a bye.	Semi-Final Tournament match
–	Judas Young received a bye.	Semi-Final Tournament match
11	Crowbar defeated Judas Young	Final Tournament match
(c) - refers to the champion prior to the match

=== Tournament bracket ===
This was a one-night tournament held on September 26, 2009. The tournament brackets were:

Quarterfinals
Crowbar	Pin
Justin Corino
Judas Young	Pin
Monsta Mack
Danny Demanto	DDQ
Danny Maff
B-Boy	DCO
Josh Daniels

Semifinals
Crowbar	BYE
Judas Young
BYE

Finals
Crowbar	Pin
Judas Young
