= Dennis Coralluzzo =

American wrestling promoter (1953–2001)

Personal information
- Born: Dennis A. Coralluzzo; March 5, 1953 National Park, New Jersey, US
- Died: July 30, 2001 (aged 48) Woodbury, New Jersey, US
- Cause of death: brain hemorrhage

Professional wrestling career

Dennis A. Coralluzzo Sr. (March 5, 1953 – July 30, 2001) was an American professional wrestling promoter for the New Jersey division of the National Wrestling Alliance (NWA) and former president and board member of the NWA.

== Early life ==
Dennis Coralluzzo was raised in National Park, New Jersey.

== Professional wrestling career ==
=== National Wrestling Alliance ===
Coralluzzo started as a wrestling promoter in Philadelphia, Pennsylvania, and New Jersey, eventually becoming promoter of NWA New Jersey. In 1993, he was invited to attend a meeting in Texas with Tod Gordon, Jim Crockett Jr., Jim Cornette and an Australian promoter with the intent of resurrecting the National Wrestling Alliance following the departure from the NWA of World Championship Wrestling (WCW), which had emerged as the last major NWA member promotion following the consolidation of the industry in the wake of the World Wrestling Federation's national expansion in the 1980s. During the meeting, Coralluzzo was elected joint-president of the NWA. After the agreement, Coralluzzo took a dislike to Gordon's Eastern Championship Wrestling (ECW) for their promotion of hardcore wrestling. He would do what he could to limit them including calling fire commissioners on their shows and sending tapes to groups in towns where ECW were going, to show how violent their matches were. As a result, Coralluzzo managed to get a number of their events cancelled where in response on one occasion Cactus Jack threatened him over the telephone for "taking money from his family". In 1992, Coralluzzo teamed with Mike Doggendorf losing to Jerry Lawler in a handicap match for United States Wrestling Association in Memphis.

=== Eastern Championship Wrestling ===
Eventually the NWA announced they would hold an event to crown a new NWA World Heavyweight Champion which would be booked by NWA Eastern Championship Wrestling as the NWA World Title Tournament in 1994. Coralluzzo expressed opposition to this however it was agreed by the NWA board that NWA: ECW should book the event as they were the only NWA member that had a television contract. Coralluzzo had suspicions of Gordon and Crockett in that he thought they wanted to monopolize the title as Crockett had previously done in the 80s. As such, he claimed they did not have NWA board approval and would personally oversee the tournament. Owing to their disagreements with Coralluzzo, Gordon and the booker Paul Heyman decided to swerve Coralluzzo by having the eventual winner of the tournament, the ECW Heavyweight Champion Shane Douglas throw down the NWA World Heavyweight Championship belt immediately after winning and verbally insult it. They did this as they felt Coralluzzo was attempting to monopolize the title.

Immediately after Douglas had thrown the belt down, Coralluzzo was initially assured backstage by Gordon that it was a worked shoot for a "NWA vs ECW" angle. When Coralluzzo was approached for comment by interviewers, he initially declared that he was not going to say anything until after a conference call with Jim Crockett Jr. and other NWA board members. He called Douglas' actions "a disgrace" and said "he had no right to do that". He later stated that ECW was under NWA jurisdiction and he was going to request that the NWA strip Douglas of both the NWA and ECW titles stating "he doesn't deserve to be the NWA world champion". In response to Coralluzzo's statement the next week, ECW President Gordon replied to Coralluzzo's remarks as "the representative of the NWA Board of Directors took it upon himself to inform you that they have the power to force NWA:Eastern Championship Wrestling not to recognize "The Franchise" Shane Douglas as the world heavyweight champion". As a result of Coralluzzo's comments, Gordon declared that he had folded NWA:Eastern Championship Wrestling and withdrawn from the NWA. He said that it would be replaced with Extreme Championship Wrestling as an independent wrestling promotion and recognized Shane Douglas as their world champion.

After the split of ECW from the NWA, Coralluzzo held a second NWA World Title Tournament in November 1994 to try again at resurrecting the NWA as a respectable force in professional wrestling. The tournament was won by Chris Candido. However, owing to the high-profile disrespect that ECW had shown to the NWA World Heavyweight title, the NWA brand had been damaged and were unable to recover despite Coralluzzo's efforts.

=== Later years ===
A year later, Coralluzzo stepped down as NWA President. However he remained a part of the NWA and made a deal with Vince McMahon of the World Wrestling Federation (WWF) in 1997 for The NWA to appear on WWF television. During the NWA's debut on WWF programming, Coralluzzo was introduced as NWA vice-president and awarded Jeff Jarrett with the NWA North American Heavyweight Championship on WWF Raw Is War. In 1999 he was removed from the NWA board. The most commonly reported reason was due to ill health however it has also been stated that it was due to owing a $6,000 debt to overseas wrestlers as well as for making racist comments. During this time, Coralluzzo was also going through a divorce from his wife. Despite leaving the NWA, he made plans to create his own wrestling promotion and continued to work around the professional wrestling scene in New Jersey for the remainder of his life.

== Death ==
A resident of West Deptford Township, New Jersey, Coralluzzo went into a coma and died on July 30, 2001, due to bleeding on the brain. In his honor, the Dennis Coralluzzo Invitational was held in 2009 and Coralluzzo's family accepted his posthumous induction into the NWA Hall of Fame.

== Awards and accomplishments ==
- National Wrestling Alliance
  - NWA Hall of Fame (2009)

Preceded by Seiji Sakaguchi	President of the National Wrestling Alliance; 1993–1995 (with Howard Brody, Steve Rickard)	Succeeded by Steve Rickard
