= Roy Welch =

American professional wrestler and promoter (1901-1977)

Personal information
- Born: Roy Edward Welch; December 19, 1901 Sallisaw, Oklahoma, U.S.
- Died: September 27, 1977 (aged 75) Trenton, Tennessee, U.S.
- Children: Penny Welch
- Family: Jimmy Golden (grandson); Robert Fuller (grandson); Ron Fuller (grandson)

Professional wrestling career
- Ring name: Roy Welch
- Billed height: 5 ft 10 in (178 cm)
- Billed weight: 181 lb (82 kg)
- Trained by: Cal Farley; Dutch Mantell (Alfred Albert Joe de Re la Gardiur)
- Debut: 1930
- Retired: 1971

Roy Edward Welch (December 19, 1901 – September 27, 1977) was an American professional wrestler and promoter. He is best known as the promoter of the NWA Mid-America territory (also known simply as the Nashville office) alongside Nick Gulas.

== Professional wrestling career ==
Welch began wrestling in 1930. During the 1930s, he was a prominent tag team wrestler alongside his brother Herb Welch.

The Welch brothers were recognized as the inaugural NWA Mid-America AWA Southern Tag Team Champions in 1943. Welch won the title a second time with Eddie Gossett in 1950, then twice more with Herb Welch in 1952.

In 1944, the Welch brothers were recognized as the NWA World Tag Team Champions. They vacated the titles in 1946 after Herb Welch was injured in a car accident.

In 1949, the Welch brothers were recognised as the inaugural NWA Tennessee Tag Team Champions after defeating Art Nelson and Earl Knielson.

In 1949, the Welch brothers won the Mid-Atlantic Championship Wrestling NWA Southern Tag Team Championship, holding the title until 1951.

In 1956, Roy Welch and Chris Tolos won the NWA Tennessee Tag Team Championship.

Welch retired from professional wrestling in 1971.

== Promoting career ==
Welch began promoting in the 1940s, establishing the Nashville office with Nick Gulas. Welch and Gulas' territory spanned Alabama, Arkansas, Kentucky, Mississippi, and Tennessee. In 1949, Welch and Gulas joined the National Wrestling Alliance. Their promotion was known as NWA Mid-America.

In the early-1950s, Welch acquired the Mobile-Pensacola (Gulf Coast) end of Leroy McGuirk's Tri-State Wrestling promotion, turning it into its own promotion. Due to Welch's commitments in Nashville, his son Buddy Fuller (Edward Welch) was appointed booker for Gulf Coast Championship Wrestling. Welch sold his interest in the promotion to Lee Fields in 1959–1960, who rebranded the promotion Gulf Coast Championship Wrestling.

In 1960, Welch and Gulas were charged with conspiring to stop an investigation of their business practices, having allegedly made payments to Senator Estes Kefauver (himself a former wrestler), who had made a complaint against them with the United States Department of Justice for obstructing his attempts to promote professional wrestling in opposition to them.

In the 1960s, Welch hired Jerry Jarrett as an office assistant; Jarrett eventually became the booker for the Memphis area of Welch's territory, taking over from Welch as his health declined.

Welch retired from promoting in the 1970s due to ill health. In 1977, shortly before Welch's death, NWA Mid-America was split in two after Jerry Jarrett broke away from Nick Gulas following a business dispute, with Welch siding with Jarrett.

In addition to promoting, Welch owned a large dairy farm in Gibson County, Tennessee and a herd of Poland China pigs.

== Personal life ==
Welch had multiple relatives who became professional wrestlers, including his brothers Herb, Jack, and Lester, his son Buddy, and his grandsons Jimmy Golden, Robert Fuller, and Ron Fuller.

== Death ==
Welch died on September 27, 1977, at the age of 75 in the Trenton Memorial Hospital in Trenton, Tennessee.

== Championships and accomplishments ==
- George Tragos/Lou Thesz Professional Wrestling Hall of Fame
  - Lou Thesz Award 2026 – with the Welch/Fuller Family
- Mid-Atlantic Championship Wrestling
  - NWA Southern Tag Team Championship (Mid-Atlantic version) (1 time) – with Herb Welch
- NWA Mid-America
  - AWA Southern Tag Team Championship (4 times) – with Eddie Gossett (1 time) and Herb Welch (3 times)
  - NWA Tennessee Tag Team Championship (2 times) – with Chris Tolos (1 time) and Herb Welch (1 time)
  - NWA World Tag Team Championship (Mid-America version) (1 time) – with Herb Welch
