= Billy Wicks =

American professional wrestler (1932–2016)

Personal information
- Born: William Wicks; April 4, 1932 St. Paul, Minnesota, U.S.
- Died: May 6, 2016 (aged 84)

Professional wrestling career
- Ring name: Billy Wicks
- Billed height: 5 ft 11 in (180 cm)
- Billed weight: 180 lb (82 kg)
- Debut: 1956
- Retired: 1972

William Wicks (April 4, 1932 – May 6, 2016) was an American professional wrestler who was known for his shoot style of wrestling.

== Professional wrestling career ==
Wicks made his wrestling debut in 1956. He would spend of his career for Gulf Coast Wrestling. Later in his career, he worked for American Wrestling Association in Minnesota.

Wicks retired from wrestling in 1972.

== Death ==
Wicks died on May 6, 2016, at 84.

== Championships and accomplishments ==
- Gulf Coast Championship Wrestling
  - NWA Gulf Coast Heavyweight Championship (4 times)
- NWA Mid-America
  - NWA World Tag Team Championship (Mid-America version) with Yvon Robert
