= Nick Gulas =

American wrestling promoter (1914-1991)

Personal information
- Born: September 3, 1914 Birmingham, Alabama, U.S.
- Died: January 21, 1991 (aged 76) Nashville, Tennessee, U.S.
- Children: George Gulas

Professional wrestling career
- Ring name: Nick Gulas
- Debut: 1937
- Retired: 1980

Nicholas Gulas (Greek: Νικόλαος Γκούλας; September 3, 1914 – January 21, 1991) was a Greek-American professional wrestling promoter in the Southern United States, partnered with Tennessee promoter Roy Welch for decades. Gulas was also known as "The King of Managers", "King B", and the "Dean of Promoters".

Gulas helped start the careers of such wrestling stars as Tojo Yamamoto, Jackie Fargo, and Jerry "The King" Lawler in the 1960s and 1970s, the Bounty Hunters with Jimmy Kent, and the Interns with Dr. Ken Ramey in the 1970s and 1980s.

== Personal life ==
Nick Gulas and his wife Katharine were married until her death in 1986. The couple had one child, a son, George, who would join his father in the wrestling business. Nick Gulas died in 1991, aged 76, in Nashville, Tennessee. He is buried there in Mount Olivet Cemetery. The Nashville Sports Arena at the Tennessee State Fairgrounds was renamed the "Nick Gulas Sports Arena" in his honor.

== Professional wrestling promoter ==
Gulas became involved in professional wrestling in the 1940s, working both as a manager and later behind the scenes as well as a promoter in Florida. In the late 1940s he joined with Roy Welch to form the "Gulas-Welch Wrestling Enterprises Inc." promotion, based in Dyersburg and Nashville, Tennessee.

In 1949 the group joined the National Wrestling Alliance, a national sanctioning body that divided the US into territories. The promotion became known as NWA Mid-America at this point.

In 1953 they added Knoxville to their territory as promoter John Cazana joined the group, expanding the territory across several states. Over the years NWA Mid-America worked closely together with the surrounding southern NWA territories, especially those run by Roy Welch's siblings. With time Roy Welch's health began to fail, which led to him bringing in Jerry Jarrett as a booker to help handle the day-to-day work behind the scenes.

In the early 1970s, his son George became a wrestler for NWA Mid-America and was promoted as one of the top names in the territory despite not being a very talented wrestler according to the wrestlers in the territory.

In 1977 Gulas' insistence on making George Gulas one of the featured names in the promotion led to a split between Gulas and Jerry Jarrett, who broke away from Gulas and began the Continental Wrestling Association (CWA) in Memphis, essentially splitting Tennessee between himself and Gulas.

By late 1980 NWA Mid-America closed down and Gulas went into semi-retirement as did his son George Gulas since no one wanted to hire him as a wrestler.

== Championships and accomplishments ==
- Memphis Wrestling Hall of Fame
  - Class of 2022
- National Wrestling Alliance
  - NWA Hall of Fame (2010)

== See also ==
- List of professional wrestling promoters
